= 2026 Senior Open Championship =

Tournament information
- Dates: 23–26 July 2026
- Location: Auchterarder, Perthshire, Scotland, United Kingdom; 56°17′09″N 3°44′51″W
- Courses: Gleneagles Hotel, (King’s Course)
- Organised by: The R&A
- Tours: European Senior Tour; PGA Tour Champions
- Format: 72 holes stroke play

Statistics
- Par: 70
- Length: 6,859 yards (6,272 m)
- Field: 144 players
- Cut: 145 (+5)
- Prize fund: US$2,850,000
- Winner's share: US$447,800

Champion
- (United States) Jerry Kelly
- 270 (−10)
- Location in Europe Location in the British Isles Location in Scotland

The 2026 Senior Open Championship, by sponsor reasons named the ISPS Handa Senior Open, was a senior major golf championship for players aged 50 and over. It was the 39th Senior Open Championship. It was held 23–26 July at Gleneagles – Kings Course in Auchterarder, Perthshire, Scotland. It was the 23rd Senior Open Championship played as a senior major championship.

== Venue ==
The Gleneagles Hotel opened in 1924 and is located one hour outside of Edinburgh and set in grounds of 850 acres (340 ha; 1.33 sq mi). Gleneagles has three golf courses: the King's Course, Queen's Course and PGA Centenary Course, previously known as the Monarch's Course. There is also a nine-hole course called the PGA National Academy Course. The championship course, the Kings Course, was originally designed by James Braid and opened in 1919.

The venue had formerly hosted the 2014 Ryder Cup, the 2019 Solheim Cup as well as the 2022 Senior Open Championship.

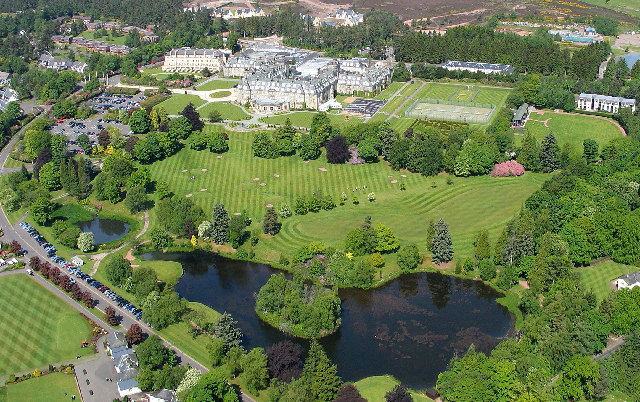
Gleneagles Hotel and grounds.

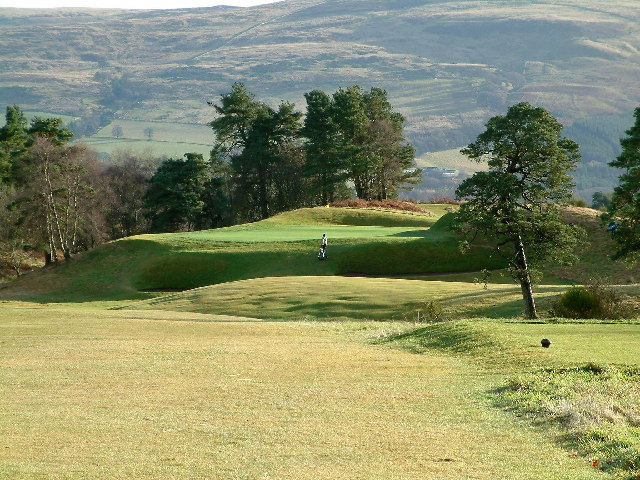
9th hole on Kings Course at Gleneagles

=== Course layout ===
| Hole | Yards | Par | Hole | Yards | Par |
|---|---|---|---|---|---|
| 1 | 359 | 4 | 10 | 495 | 5 |
| 2 | 436 | 4 | 11 | 227 | 3 |
| 3 | 372 | 4 | 12 | 475 | 4 |
| 4 | 440 | 4 | 13 | 465 | 4 |
| 5 | 177 | 3 | 14 | 341 | 4 |
| 6 | 468 | 4 | 15 | 457 | 4 |
| 7 | 472 | 4 | 16 | 157 | 3 |
| 8 | 178 | 3 | 17 | 373 | 4 |
| 9 | 410 | 4 | 18 | 563 | 5 |
| Out | 3,306 | 34 | In | 3,553 | 36 |
| Source: | | Total | | 6,859 | 70 |

== Field ==
The field of 144 competitors (139 professionals and five amateurs) included both 127 players exempt through different exemption categories and 17 players qualified after competing on one of four qualifying events, held in Scotland at Blairgowrie Golf Club (on both the Rosemount course and the Lansdowne course), Stirling Golf Club and Glenbervie Golf Club on Monday 20 July 2026.

=== Exemption categories and entered exempt players ===
Each exemption category required players to have reached their 50th birthday on or before 23 July 2026. (Note: (a) – denotes amateur)

1. Former Winners of The Senior Open aged 65 or under

- Pádraig Harrington, K.J. Choi, Alex Cejka, Darren Clarke, Stephen Dodd, Miguel Ángel Jiménez

2. Former Winners of The Masters Tournament, US PGA Championship, US Open and The Open aged 65 or under

- Zach Johnson, Y.E. Yang, Shaun Micheel, Rich Beem, Michael Campbell, Retief Goosen, Ernie Els, Henrik Stenson, Stewart Cink, David Duval, Paul Lawrie, Justin Leonard

3. Top 50 players on the European Senior Tour career money list

- Colin Montgomerie, Søren Kjeldsen, Robert Karlsson, David Howell, Thongchai Jaidee, Jamie Donaldson, Stephen Gallacher, Raphaël Jacquelin, Paul McGinley, Niclas Fasth, Bradley Dredge, Richard Green, Anthony Wall, Søren Hansen, Phillip Price, Thomas Levet, Steve Webster, Darren Fichardt, Jeev Milkha Singh, Scott Hend, Ricardo González, Simon Khan, Gary Orr, David Drysdale, James Kingston, Peter Baker

4. Top 50 players on the PGA Tour Champions all time money list

- Jerry Kelly, Rory Sabbatini, Fred Funk, Stuart Appleby, Mark Calcavecchia, Stephen Ames, Pat Perez, Jeff Maggert, Chad Campbell, Woody Austin, Brian Gay, Kirk Triplett, Bob Estes, Tom Pernice Jr., Joe Durant, Chris DiMarco

5. The leading 15 players, not otherwise exempt, in the top 56 of the 2025 European Senior Tour Order of Merit (increased with four players due to .less than 128 exempt entries)

- Keith Horne, Mikael Lundberg, Adilson Da Silva, Matthew Cort, Thomas Gögele, Lionel Alexandre, Emanuele Canonica, Van Phililips, Mark Brown, Robert Coles, Maarten Lafeber, Patrik Sjöland, Joakim Haeggman, Phillip Archer, Craig Farrelly, Jarmo Sandelin, Scott Drummond, Greig Hutcheon, Jean-François Remésy

6. The leading 15 players, not otherwise exempt, in the top 56 of the 2025 US Charles Schwab Cup Points List (increased with four players)

- Freddie Jacobson, Tag Ridings, Jason Caron, Mark Hensby, Michael Wright, Charlie Wi, Matt Gogel, Paul Stankowski, Tim Petrovic, Timothy O'Neal, Ken Tanigawa, Paul Goydos, Heath Slocum, Rod Pampling, Shane Bertsch, Scott Parel, Billy Andrade, Mario Tiziani, Harrison Frazar

7. Players finishing in positions 1–10 in The 2025 Senior Open

- Cameron Percy, Steven Alker, Stephen Allan, Greg Chalmers

8. Winners of official individual tournaments on the European Senior Tour and PGA Tour Champions since 2025 Senior Open

- Bo van Pelt, Markus Brier, Andrew Marshall, Greg Owen, Simon Griffiths, Doug Barron, Tommy Gainey, Johan Edfors, Dicky Pride, Boo Weekley

9. Winners of official tournaments on the European Tour or PGA Tour, aged 50

- Ryan Armour, Vaughn Taylor, Hennie Otto, Ben Crane, George McNeill, Bill Lunde, Alastair Forsyth, Mark Foster

10. Past playing members of Ryder Cup and Presidents Cup teams aged 50

11. Former winners of the European Tour or PGA Tour Order of Merit aged 50–55

12. Winners of The US Senior Open 2022–2026

13. Winners of the Senior PGA Championship 2022–2026

14. The leading 2 players, not otherwise exempt, in the top 10 of the 2025 Japan PGA Senior Tour money list

- Thammanoon Sriroj, Takashi Iwamoto

15. The first 2 players, and 2nd place ties, not otherwise exempt, in the top 30 of the current European Senior Tour Order of Merit (increased with one player)

- Clark Dennis, Felipe Aguilar, Doug McGuigan

16. The first 2 players, and 2nd place ties, not otherwise exempt, in the top 30 of the current US Charles Schwab Cup money list

17. The 2026 Senior Amateur Champion

- Brian Hoops (a)

18. The 2025 US Senior Amateur Champion

- Michael McCoy (a)

19. The 2026 European Senior Men's Amateur Champion

- Stephen Creed (a)

=== Qualifiers ===
- Shinichi Yokota, Jyoti Randhawa, Gordon Burns, Luis Portela, Kyron Sullivan (a), Todd Sapere, David Park, Richard Dinsdale, Mathew Goggin, Michael Long, Knud Storgaard, Malcolm MacKenzie, Sam Little, Carl Suneson, Sean Whiffin, Will Dugdale (a), Akinori Tani

== Round summaries ==
=== First round ===
Thursday, 23 July 2026

52-year-old Australian Cameron Percy, on his first visit at the Gleneagles course, took a solo lead after the first round, playing in calm weather on Thursday morning, with a seven-under-par-round of 63, including eight birdies and one bogey. Percy. winless in his career on the PGA Tour, as well as on the PGA Tour Champions, despite a few playoff losses, qualified for the championship through a 5th place finish at the 2025 Senior Open. One stroke behind Percy, after the first round, was 53-year-old Frenchman Lionel Alexandre, previously winless on any important regular tour as well as a senior, with a bogeyfree round of 64.

| Place | Player | Score | To par |
|---|---|---|---|
| 1 | (Australia) Cameron Percy | 63 | −7 |
| 2 | (France) Lionel Alexandre | 64 | −6 |
| T3 | (South Africa) Ernie Els | 65 | −5 |
| T3 | (Spain) Miguel Ángel Jiménez | 65 | −5 |
| T3 | (United States) Pat Perez | 65 | −5 |
| T3 | (United States) Tom Pernice Jr. | 65 | −5 |
| T7 | (Italy) Emanuele Canonica | 66 | −4 |
| T7 | (Sweden) Johan Edfors | 66 | −4 |
| T7 | (United States) Jerry Kelly | 66 | −4 |
| T7 | (United States) Tag Ridings | 66 | −4 |
| T7 | (Australia) Michael Wright | 66 | −4 |

=== Second round ===
Friday, 24 July 2026

Cameron Percy extended his lead to three shots on a more windy second day of the championship, after a round of 68, despite being two over par after eight holes, but coming back with four birdies in his last ten holes. 59-year-old Jerry Kelly, with 13 wins on the PGA Tour Champions, including two senior majors, advanced to solo second, three strokes behind the leader. Former Open Champions Ernie Els and Henrik Stenson, the latter making his Senior Open debut, were among three players another two strokes behind. 79 players, including one amateur, made the 36-hole cut on five over par. Among those missing the cut were former Open champions Justin Leonard, Mark Calcavecchia and David Duval as well as Scottish home player Colin Montgomerie.

| Place | Player | Score | To par |
|---|---|---|---|
| 1 | (Australia) Cameron Percy | 63-68=131 | −9 |
| 2 | (United States) Jerry Kelly | 66-68=134 | −6 |
| T3 | (Austria) Markus Brier | 67-69=136 | −4 |
| T3 | (South Africa) Ernie Els | 65-71=136 | −4 |
| T3 | (Sweden) Henrik Stenson | 68-68=136 | −4 |
| T6 | (France) Lionel Alexandre | 64-73=137 | −3 |
| T6 | (United States) Matt Gogel | 68-69=137 | −3 |
| T8 | (England) Peter Baker | 69-69=138 | −2 |
| T8 | (Germany) Alex Čejka | 68-70=138 | −2 |
| T8 | (South Africa) Darren Fichardt | 70-68=138 | −2 |
| T8 | (United States) Tom Pernice Jr. | 65-73=138 | −2 |
| T8 | (United States) Tag Ridings | 66-72=138 | −2 |
| T8 | (Australia) Michael Wright | 66-72=138 | −2 |

=== Third round ===
Saturday, 25 July 2026

Tournament leader Cameron Percy became three over par after four holes in the third round, but came back to score three under par on his last three holes, including an eagle three on the last hole, for a one-over-par-round of 71. Percy finished tied leader with Jerry Kelly, with one round to go. Peter Baker finished his round with four birdies on his last five holes, for a round of 67 and avanced to solo third.

| Place | Player | Score | To par |
|---|---|---|---|
| T1 | (United States) Jerry Kelly | 66-68-68=202 | −8 |
| T1 | (Australia) Cameron Percy | 63-68-71=202 | −8 |
| 3 | (England) Peter Baker | 69-69-67=205 | −5 |
| 4 | (South Africa) Darren Fichardt | 70-68-68=206 | −4 |
| T5 | (Austria) Markus Brier | 67-69-71=207 | −3 |
| T5 | (South Africa) Ernie Els | 65-71-71=207 | −3 |
| T5 | (United States) Pat Perez | 65-75-67=207 | −3 |
| T8 | (Germany) Alex Čejka | 68-70-70=208 | −2 |
| T8 | (South Korea) K. J. Choi | 70-70-68=208 | −2 |
| T8 | (United States) Clark Dennis | 69-72-67=208 | −2 |
| T8 | (United States) Zach Johnson | 67-73-68=208 | −2 |
| T8 | (United States) Tag Ridings | 66-72-70=208 | −2 |
| T8 | (Slovakia) Rory Sabbatini | 67-73-68=208 | −2 |

=== Final round ===
Sunday, 26 July 2026

Sunday morning rain softened the course for the final round. Playing in the last group, Jerry Kelly birdied the par 5 last hole to win, by two shots, his first Senor Open Championship and third senior major champiponship. Scottish home player Stephen Gallacher shot the low round of the tournament with an eight-under-par-score of 62 and advanced to fifth place. Defending champion Pádraig Harrington finished tied 41st, 14 strokes behind the winner. Kyron Sullivan was awarded best amateur at tied 62nd place on nine over par.

| Place | Player | Score | To par | Prize money (€) |
|---|---|---|---|---|
| 1 | (United States) Jerry Kelly | 66-68-68.68=270 | −10 | 393,568 |
| T2 | (South Africa) Darren Fichardt | 70-68-68-66=272 | −8 | 174,838 |
| T2 | (United States) Matt Gogel | 68-69-72-63=272 | −8 | 174,838 |
| T2 | (Australia) Cameron Percy | 63-68-71-70=272 | −8 | 174,838 |
| 5 | (Scotland) Stephen Gallacher | 72-69-71-62=274 | −6 | 97,689 |
| 6 | (United States) Tag Ridings | 66-72-70-67=275 | −5 | 80,155 |
| T7 | (Italy) Emanuele Canonica | 66-76-69-65=276 | −4 | 57,361 |
| T7 | (South Korea) K. J. Choi | 70-70-68-68=276 | −4 | 57,361 |
| T7 | (United States) Zach Johnson | 67-73-68-68=276 | −4 | 57,361 |
| T7 | (United States) Boo Weekley | 67-74-70-65=276 | −4 | 57,361 |

== Notes ==
| Preceded by 2026 U.S. Senior Open | Senior Major Championships | Succeeded by 2027 Senior PGA Championship |
