= 2026 European Senior Tour =

Golf tour season

2026 European Senior Tour season
- Duration: 20 February 2026 – 6 December 2026
- Number of official events: 19

The 2026 European Senior Tour, titled as the 2026 Staysure Legends Tour for sponsorship reasons, is the 34th season of the European Senior Tour, the main professional golf tour in Europe for men aged 50 and over.

== Staysure title sponsorship ==
In February 2026, it was announced that the tour had signed a title sponsorship agreement with insurance company Staysure, being renamed as the Staysure Legends Tour.

== Schedule ==
The following table lists official events during the 2026 season.

Date	Tournament	Host country	Purse (€)	Winner (Note: The number in brackets after each winner's name is the number of European Senior Tour events they had won up to and including that tournament. This information is only shown for European Senior Tour members.)	Other tours (Note: CHMP − PGA Tour Champions.)	Notes
22 Feb	Staysure Marbella Legends	Spain	500,000	(Wales) Jamie Donaldson (2)		
19 Apr	Senior PGA Championship	United States	US$3,000,000	(United States) Stewart Cink (n/a)		Senior major championship
26 Apr	Barbados Legends	Barbados	US$600,000	(England) Greg Owen (2)		
14 Jun	Costa Navarino Legends Tour Trophy	Greece	500,000	(England) Simon Griffiths (3)		
5 Jul	U.S. Senior Open	United States	US$4,000,000	(Republic of Ireland) Pádraig Harrington (4)		Senior major championship
12 Jul	OFX Irish Legends	Ireland	400,000	(Sweden) Johan Edfors (1)		
26 Jul	ISPS Handa Senior Open	Scotland	US$2,850,000	(United States) Jerry Kelly (n/a)		Senior major championship
2 Aug	Portugal Invitational	Portugal	US$3,000,000	(United States) Zach Johnson (n/a)	CHMP	New tournament
9 Aug	Staysure PGA Seniors Championship	Scotland	1,000,000	(South Africa) Darren Fichardt (2)		
30 Aug	Staysure English Legends	England	500,000	(Sweden) Mikael Lundberg (1)		
6 Sep	NI Legends	Northern Ireland	500,000	(New Zealand) Steven Alker (n/a)		
20 Sep	European Legends Cup	Spain	500,000	(Sweden) Johan Edfors (2)		
4 Oct	Reignwood Legends Championship	China	US$650,000	(South Africa) Jean Hugo (1)		
24 Oct	Sergio Melpignano Senior Italian Open	Italy	450,000	(England) Craig Farrelly (1)		
1 Nov	Portugal Legends Championship	Portugal	450,000	(South Africa) Jean Hugo (2)		New tournament
8 Nov	Champions UK plc European Senior Masters	Spain	400,000	(South Africa) Jean Hugo (3)		
22 Nov	Vietnam Legends Championship	Vietnam	US$635,000	(Wales) Jamie Donaldson (3)		
29 Nov	Vattanac Legends Championship	Cambodia	US$635,000			
4 Dec	Legends Tour Championship	Cambodia	US$800,000			Tour Championship
