= World Champions Cup =

Golf tournament

Tournament information
- Location: Clearwater, Florida. U.S.
- Established: 2023
- Course: Feather Sound Country Club
- Par: 72
- Tour: PGA Tour Champions
- Format: Stroke play
- Prize fund: US$1,575,000
- Month played: December

Current champion
- Team Europe

The World Champions Cup is an annual golf tournament for three seven-player teams, consisting of PGA Tour Champions players. It was first played in 2023 at The Concession Golf Club in Bradenton, Florida. The 2025 edition was moved to Feather Sound Country Club in Clearwater, Florida.

== Format ==
The tournament is a three-day competition involving three seven-player teams, one representing the United States, one representing Europe, and one International, consisting of the rest of the Americas, Asia, Africa, and Oceania, and is a stroke-play team competition contested across 24 9-hole matches featuring team and singles play. The team formats are six-ball and Scotch six-somes (modified alternate shot), with morning and afternoon waves. Team USA captained by Jim Furyk won the inaugural competition.

== Winners ==
Year	Winners	Runners-up	Third place
2025	Team Europe: (Northern Ireland) Darren Clarke (c); (Denmark) Søren Kjeldsen; (Sweden) Jesper Parnevik; (Denmark) Thomas Bjørn; (Germany) Alex Čejka; (Spain) Miguel Ángel Jiménez; (Germany) Bernhard Langer; (Scotland) Colin Montgomerie	Team International: (Canada) Mike Weir (c); (Argentina) Ricardo González; (South Korea) Charlie Wi; (New Zealand) Steven Alker; (Argentina) Ángel Cabrera; (South Korea) K. J. Choi; (Australia) Mark Hensby; (South Korea) Yang Yong-eun	Team USA: (United States) Jim Furyk (c); (United States) Billy Andrade; (United States) Steve Flesch; (United States) Jason Caron; (United States) Stewart Cink; (United States) Jerry Kelly; (United States) Justin Leonard; (United States) Steve Stricker
2024	Canceled (Note: Canceled due to Hurricane Helene and Hurricane Milton.)		
2023	Team USA: (United States) Jim Furyk (c); (United States) Billy Andrade; (United States) Jerry Kelly; (United States) Justin Leonard; (United States) Brett Quigley; (United States) Steve Stricker; (United States) David Toms	Team International: (South Africa) Ernie Els (c); (New Zealand) Steven Alker; (Canada) Stephen Ames; (Australia) Stuart Appleby; (South Korea) K. J. Choi; (South Africa) Retief Goosen; (Fiji) Vijay Singh	Team Europe: (Northern Ireland) Darren Clarke (c); (Germany) Alex Čejka; (Spain) Miguel Ángel Jiménez; (Sweden) Robert Karlsson; (Germany) Bernhard Langer; (Scotland) Colin Montgomerie; (Sweden) Jesper Parnevik
