= 2004 WGC-NEC Invitational =

Golf tournament

Coordinates: 41.008°N 81.508°W

Tournament information
- Dates: August 19–22, 2004
- Location: Akron, Ohio, U.S.
- Course: Firestone Country Club
- Tour(s): PGA Tour; European Tour

Statistics
- Par: 70
- Length: 7,360
- Field: 76 players
- Cut: None
- Prize fund: $7,000,000
- Winner's share: $1,200,000

Champion
- (United States) Stewart Cink
- 269 (−11)

The 2004 WGC-NEC Invitational was a golf tournament that was contested from August 19–22, 2004 over the South Course at Firestone Country Club in Akron, Ohio. It was the sixth WGC-NEC Invitational tournament, and the second of four World Golf Championships events held in 2004.

Stewart Cink won the tournament to capture his first World Golf Championships title.

== Round summaries ==
=== First round ===
Place	Player	Score	To par
1	(United States) Stewart Cink	63	−7
2	(United States) Zach Johnson	65	−5
T3	(England) Barry Lane	67	−3
T3	(United States) Bob Tway	67	−3
T5	(United States) Chris DiMarco	68	−2
T5	(United States) Jim Furyk	68	−2
T5	(Spain) Sergio García	68	−2
T5	(France) Thomas Levet	68	−2
T5	(United States) Davis Love III	68	−2
T5	(Australia) Rod Pampling	68	−2
T5	(South Africa) Rory Sabbatini	68	−2
T5	(United States) Tiger Woods	68	−2

=== Second round ===
Place	Player	Score	To par
1	(United States) Stewart Cink	63-68=131	−9
T2	(South Africa) Rory Sabbatini	68-66=134	−6
T2	(United States) Tiger Woods	68-66=134	−6
T4	(Australia) Rod Pampling	68-67=135	−5
T4	(United States) David Toms	69-66=135	−5
T6	(United States) Todd Hamilton	69-67=136	−4
T6	(United States) Davis Love III	68-68=136	−4
T8	(United States) Chris DiMarco	68-69=137	−3
T8	(South Korea) Hur Suk-ho	70-67=137	−3
T8	(Japan) Shigeki Maruyama	69-68=137	−3
T8	(Canada) Mike Weir	70-67=137	−3

=== Third round ===
Place	Player	Score	To par
1	(United States) Stewart Cink	63-68-68=199	−11
T2	(United States) Chris DiMarco	68-69-67=204	−6
T2	(United States) David Toms	69-66-69=204	−6
T2	(United States) Tiger Woods	68-66-70=204	−6
T5	(Australia) Rod Pampling	68-67-70=205	−5
T5	(South Africa) Rory Sabbatini	68-66-71=205	−5
T5	(United States) Scott Verplank	69-69-67=205	−5
T8	(Argentina) Ángel Cabrera	69-70-67=206	−4
T8	(England) Luke Donald	71-70-65=206	−4
T8	(United States) Charles Howell III	71-67-68=206	−4
T8	(United States) Jerry Kelly	69-73-64=206	−4

=== Final round ===
Place	Player	Score	To par	Winnings ($)
1	(United States) Stewart Cink	63-68-68-70=269	−11	1,200,000
T2	(South Africa) Rory Sabbatini	68-66-71-68=273	−7	552,500
T2	(United States) Tiger Woods	68-66-70-69=273	−7	552,500
T4	(Argentina) Ángel Cabrera	69-70-67-68=274	−6	282,500
T4	(United States) Davis Love III	68-68-72-66=274	−6	282,500
T6	(United States) Chris DiMarco	68-69-67-71=275	−5	178,333
T6	(United States) David Toms	69-66-69-71=275	−5	178,333
T6	(United States) Bob Tway	67-73-67-68=275	−5	178,333
T9	(Australia) Robert Allenby	71-67-69-69=276	−4	116,000
T9	(Australia) Stuart Appleby	69-70-69-68=276	−4	116,000
T9	(Germany) Alex Čejka	72-67-71-66=276	−4	116,000
T9	(United States) Charles Howell III	71-67-68-70=276	−4	116,000
T9	(England) Lee Westwood	69-69-69-69=276	−4	116,000
