= 2025 Senior Open Championship =

Tournament information
- Dates: 24–27 July 2025
- Location: Sunningdale, England, United Kingdom; 51.38°N 0.63°W
- Courses: Sunningdale Golf Club, Old Course
- Organised by: The R&A
- Tours: European Senior Tour; PGA Tour Champions
- Format: 72 holes stroke play

Statistics
- Par: 70
- Length: 6,641 yards (6,073 m)
- Field: 144 players, 75 after cut
- Cut: 141 (+1)
- Prize fund: US$2,850,000
- Winner's share: US$447,800

Champion
- (Republic of Ireland) Pádraig Harrington
- 264 (−16)

Location map
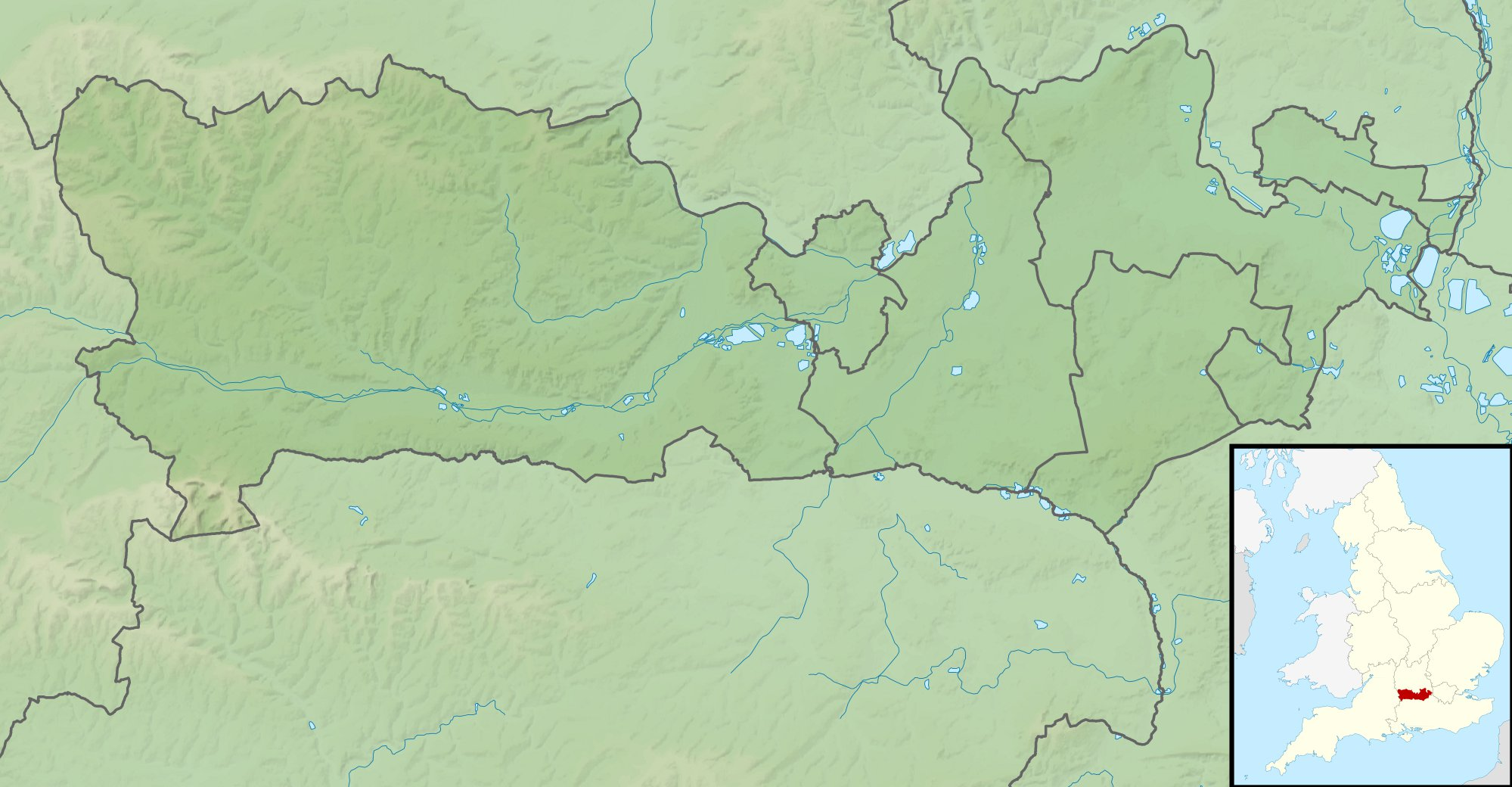
- Location in the United Kingdom Location in England Location in Berkshire

The 2025 Senior Open Championship, by sponsor reasons named the ISPS Handa Senior Open, was a senior major golf championship for players aged 50 and over. It was the 38th Senior Open Championship. It was held 24–27 July at Sunningdale Golf Club in Sunningdale, England. It was the 22nd Senior Open Championship played as a senior major championship.

== Venue ==
Sunningdale Golf Club hosted the Seniors Open for the fourth time. The course had also previously hosted The Women’s Open and had been a qualifying venue for The Open Championship.

=== Course layout ===
Hole	Yards	Par	Hole	Yards	Par
1	492	5	10	488	4
2	489	4	11	322	4
3	318	4	12	442	4
4	156	3	13	180	3
5	419	4	14	503	5
6	433	4	15	245	3
7	406	4	16	434	4
8	193	3	17	425	4
9	273	4	18	423	4
Out	3,179	35	In	3,462	35
Source:		Total		6,641	70

== Field ==
=== Qualifying ===
24 places were available to players not qualified under the exemption categories.

== Round summaries ==
=== First round ===
Thursday, 24 July 2025

Place	Player	Score	To par
1	(New Zealand) Steven Alker	63	−7
2	(Australia) Mark Hensby	64	−6
T3	(South Korea) K. J. Choi	66	−4
T3	(United States) Joe Durant	66	−4
T5	(India) Arjun Atwal	67	−3
T5	(South Africa) Ernie Els	67	−3
T5	(Argentina) Ricardo González	67	−3
T5	(South Africa) Retief Goosen	67	−3
T5	(Republic of Ireland) Pádraig Harrington	67	−3
T5	(Spain) Miguel Ángel Jiménez	67	−3
T5	(United States) Timothy O'Neal	67	−3
T5	(United States) Tag Ridings	67	−3
T5	(South Korea) Charlie Wi	67	−3

=== Second round ===
Friday, 25 July 2025

Place	Player	Score	To par
1	(Republic of Ireland) Pádraig Harrington	67-65=132	−8
T2	(Denmark) Thomas Bjørn	70-63=133	−7
T2	(South Korea) K. J. Choi	66-67=133	−7
T4	(South Africa) Ernie Els	67-67=134	−6
T4	(Argentina) Ricardo González	67-67=134	−6
T4	(United States) Justin Leonard	69-65=134	−6
T4	(Australia) Cameron Percy	69-65=134	−6
T8	(Australia) Stephen Allan	68-67=135	−5
T8	(England) Greg Owen	71-64=135	−5
T10	(New Zealand) Steven Alker	63-73=136	−4
T10	(Australia) Greg Chalmers	70-66=136	−4
T10	(Scotland) Stephen Gallacher	68-68=136	−4
T10	(Australia) Mark Hensby	64-72=136	−4
T10	(Scotland) Paul Lawrie	69-67=136	−4
T10	(United States) Corey Pavin	68-68=136	−4
T10	(United States) Kevin Sutherland	69-67=136	−4
T10	(South Korea) Yang Yong-eun	70-66=136	−4

=== Third round ===
Saturday, 26 July 2025

Place	Player	Score	To par
1	(Republic of Ireland) Pádraig Harrington	67-65-65=197	−13
2	(United States) Justin Leonard	69-65-65=199	−11
3	(Denmark) Thomas Bjørn	70-63-67=200	−10
T4	(New Zealand) Steven Alker	63-73-66=202	−8
T4	(Australia) Greg Chalmers	70-66-66=202	−8
T4	(United States) Clark Dennis	70-68-64=202	−8
T4	(United States) Kevin Sutherland	69-67-66=202	−8
T8	(South Africa) Ernie Els	67-67-69=203	−7
T8	(Australia) Scott Hend	68-71-64=203	−7
T10	(South Africa) Darren Fichardt	68-70-66=204	−6
T10	(South Africa) Keith Horne	70-69-65=204	−6
T10	(Australia) Cameron Percy	69-65-70=204	−6

=== Final round ===
Sunday, 27 July 2025

Pádraig Harrington became the fifth player in history to win both The Open Championship and the Senior Open, joining Gary Player, Bob Charles, Tom Watson and Darren Clarke.

Place	Player	Score	To par
1	(Republic of Ireland) Pádraig Harrington	67-65-65-67=264	−16
T2	(Denmark) Thomas Bjørn	70-63-67-67=267	−13
T2	(United States) Justin Leonard	69-65-65-68=267	−13
4	(Australia) Scott Hend	68-71-64-65=268	−12
T5	(South Africa) Ernie Els	67-67-69-66=269	−11
T5	(Australia) Cameron Percy	69-65-70-65=269	−11
7	(New Zealand) Steven Alker	63-73-66-68=270	−10
T8	(Australia) Stephen Allan	68-67-70-66=271	−9
T8	(Australia) Greg Chalmers	70-66-66-69=271	−9
T8	(United States) Kevin Sutherland	69-67-66-69=271	−9

Preceded by 2025 U.S. Senior Open	Senior Major Championships	Succeeded by 2026 Senior PGA Championship
