= The Concession Golf Club =

Golf course in Bradenton, Florida

The Concession Golf Club is a golf course in Bradenton, Florida. It was established in 2006, designed by Jack Nicklaus and Tony Jacklin. Its name is a reference to a famous moment in the 1969 Ryder Cup when Nicklaus conceded a three-foot putt to Jacklin, where the United States team already had scored enough points to retain the Cup (through a tie), but Jacklin missing the putt would have made a difference between a tie and an outright win by the United States team.

== Course ==
The Concession Golf Club
Tee	Rating/Slope	1	2	3	4	5	6	7	8	9	Out	10	11	12	13	14	15	16	17	18	In	Total
Black	77.6 / 155	428	476	577	237	478	183	606	374	434	3793	410	211	349	545	222	422	442	590	486	3677	7470
Par		4	4	5	3	4	3	5	4	4	36	4	3	4	5	3	4	4	5	4	36	72
SI		13	7	5	15	3	17	1	9	11		10	18	14	2	16	12	8	4	6

== Notable events ==
Year	Tournament	Tour	Winner	Winning score	To par	Margin of victory	Runner(s)-up
2026	Senior PGA Championship	PGA Tour Champions	(United States) Stewart Cink	269	–19	6 strokes	(United States) Ben Crane
2023	World Champions Cup	PGA Tour Champions	(United States) Team USA	221 points		2 points	Team International
2021	WGC-Workday Championship	PGA Tour	(United States) Collin Morikawa	270	−18	3 strokes	(United States) Billy Horschel (Norway) Viktor Hovland (United States) Brooks Koepka

== Future events ==
- 2027, 2028 Senior PGA Championship
