= Galleri Classic =

Golf tournament on the PGA Tour Champions

Coordinates: 33.798°N 116.433°W

Tournament information
- Location: Rancho Mirage, California
- Established: 2023
- Course: Mission Hills Country Club
- Par: 72
- Length: 7,165 yards (6,552 m)
- Tour: PGA Tour Champions
- Format: Stroke play
- Prize fund: US$2,200,000
- Month played: October

Tournament record score
- Aggregate: 200 David Toms (2023)
- To par: −16 as above

Current champion
- (Australia) Stephen Allan

Location map
- Location in the United States Location in California

The Galleri Classic is a golf tournament on the PGA Tour Champions. It is played annually in the spring in Rancho Mirage, California at the Mission Hills Country Club. The tournament was founded in 2023, the year after the Chevron Championship, a women's major, which had been previously played at Mission Hills annually, moved to a new location.

== Winners ==
Year	Winner	Score	To par	Margin of victory	Runner-up
2025	(Australia) Stephen Allan	201	−15	1 stroke	(United States) Tag Ridings
2024	(South Africa) Retief Goosen	203	−13	1 stroke	(New Zealand) Steven Alker
2023	(United States) David Toms	200	−16	4 strokes	(New Zealand) Steven Alker
