= American Family Insurance Championship =

Coordinates: 43.023°N 89.545°W

Tournament information
- Location: Madison, Wisconsin
- Established: 2016
- Courses: University Ridge Golf Course (2016-2024); TPC Wisconsin (2025-)
- Par: 71
- Length: 7,259 yards (6,638 m)
- Tour: PGA Tour Champions
- Format: Team stroke play
- Prize fund: US$3,000,000
- Month played: June

Tournament record score
- Aggregate: Individual: 198 Steve Stricker (2023); Team: 181 Thomas Bjørn and Darren Clarke (2025)
- To par: Individual: −18 as above Team: −32 as above

Current champion
- (Northern Ireland) Darren Clarke and (United States) Ben Crane

Final champion
- Location in the United States Location in Wisconsin

The American Family Insurance Championship is a professional golf tournament in Wisconsin on the PGA Tour Champions, played at TPC Wisconsin in Madison. The inaugural edition in June 2016 featured an 81-player field and a $2 million purse in a no-cut 54-hole event.

== History ==
American Family Insurance signed a three-year agreement to be the tournament's initial title sponsor. Steve Stricker served as tournament host in 2016 and then as player-host starting in 2017, when he turned fifty and was eligible to play. Proceeds raised will support the Steve Stricker American Family Insurance Foundation, the American Family Children's Hospital, and The First Tee of South Central Wisconsin.

Kirk Triplett won the debut event in 2016 with a final round 65 (−7) for 199 (−17), two strokes ahead of runners-up Bart Bryant and Mike Goodes. After making his only bogey of the final round at the tenth hole, Triplett birdied five of the next six, then concluded with two pars.

In May 2023, it was announced that the championship will be held at TPC Wisconsin starting in 2025.

== Host ==
Born in Edgerton, Wisconsin, and a Madison resident, Stricker is an American Family Insurance brand ambassador. He co-chairs the Steve Stricker American Family Insurance Foundation, founded in 2013. In addition to his twelve wins on the PGA Tour, Stricker represented the United States on five Presidents Cup teams and three Ryder Cup teams, and ranked second in the world rankings in 2010. He won the Wisconsin State Open five times between 1987 and 2000.

== Championship tees ==
Hole	Name	Yards	Par	Hole	Name	Yards	Par
1	Verona	396	4	10	Elm Valley	483	4
2	ZigZag	555	5	11	Ridgeline	569	5
3	Floodplain	242	3	12	Dropshot	200	3
4	Morse Pond	467	4	13	Halfpipe	336	4
5	Noer's View	198	3	14	Hickory Hill	398	4
6	Kettle Pond	623	5	15	Lone Elm	352	4
7	Drumlin	429	4	16	Bunkered	554	5
8	On the Rocks	207	3	17	Reflections	250	3
9	Hedgerow	587	5	18	Capitol Climb	413	4
Out		3,704	36	In		3,555	36
Source: Rating=74.9, Slope=144				Total		7,259	72

== Winners ==
Year	Winner(s) (Note: From 2025 onwards, the American Family Insurance Championship became a two-player team event.)	Score	To par	Margin of victory	Runner(s)-up	Purse ($)	Winner's share ($)
2026	(Northern Ireland) Darren Clarke (2) and (United States) Ben Crane	183	−30	4 strokes	(United States) George McNeill and (United States) Kenny Perry	3,000,000	450,000
2025	(Denmark) Thomas Bjørn and (Northern Ireland) Darren Clarke	181	−32	4 strokes	(United States) Doug Barron and (United States) Dicky Pride (Germany) Alex Čejka and (Denmark) Søren Kjeldsen (United States) Steve Flesch and (United States) Paul Goydos (United States) Steve Stricker and (United States) Mario Tiziani	3,000,000	450,000
2024	(South Africa) Ernie Els	204	−12	Playoff	(United States) Steve Stricker	2,400,000	360,000
2023	(United States) Steve Stricker	198	−18	5 strokes	(New Zealand) Steven Alker (England) Paul Broadhurst	2,400,000	360,000
2022	(Thailand) Thongchai Jaidee	202	−14	1 stroke	(United States) Tom Pernice Jr.	2,400,000	360,000
2021	(United States) Jerry Kelly (2)	202	−14	1 stroke	(United States) Fred Couples (Spain) Miguel Ángel Jiménez	2,400,000	360,000
2020	Canceled due to the COVID-19 pandemic						
2019	(United States) Jerry Kelly	201	−15	Playoff	(South Africa) Retief Goosen (United States) Steve Stricker	2,000,000	300,000
2018	(United States) Scott McCarron	201	−15	1 stroke	(United States) Jerry Kelly	2,000,000	300,000
2017	(United States) Fred Couples	201	−15	2 strokes	(United States) Scott Verplank	2,000,000	300,000
2016	(United States) Kirk Triplett	199	−17	2 strokes	(United States) Bart Bryant (United States) Mike Goodes	2,000,000	300,000
