= 2026 PGA Tour Champions season =

Golf tour season

- Duration: January 22, 2026 – November 15, 2026
- Number of official events: 28
- Most wins: (United States) Stewart Cink (6) (United States) Zach Johnson (6)
- Charles Schwab Cup: (United States) Stewart Cink
- Money list: (United States) Stewart Cink

The 2026 PGA Tour Champions season was the 46th season of PGA Tour Champions (formerly the Senior PGA Tour and the Champions Tour), the main professional golf tour in the United States for men aged 50 and over.

== Schedule ==
The following table lists official events during the 2026 season.

Date	Tournament	Location	Purse (US$)	Winner (Note: The number in parentheses after each winner's name is the number of PGA Tour Champions events they had won up to and including that tournament. This information is only shown for PGA Tour Champions members.)	Other tours (Note: EST − European Senior Tour.)	Notes
Jan 24	Mitsubishi Electric Championship at Hualalai	Hawaii	2,000,000	(United States) Stewart Cink (5)		
Feb 15	Chubb Classic	Florida	1,800,000	(United States) David Toms (5)		
Mar 8	James Hardie Pro Football Hall of Fame Invitational	Florida	2,200,000	(United States) Zach Johnson (1)		
Mar 22	Cologuard Classic	Arizona	2,200,000	(New Zealand) Steven Alker (11)		
Mar 29	Hoag Classic	California	2,200,000	(United States) Stewart Cink (6)		
Apr 19	Senior PGA Championship	Florida	3,000,000	(United States) Stewart Cink (7)		Senior major championship
Apr 26	Mitsubishi Electric Classic	Georgia	2,000,000	(South Africa) Retief Goosen (5)		
May 3	Regions Tradition	Alabama	2,600,000	(United States) Stewart Cink (8)		PGA Tour Champions major championship
May 10	Insperity Invitational	Texas	3,000,000	(United States) Boo Weekley (1)		
May 23	Trophy Hassan II	Morocco	2,500,000	(Australia) Scott Hend (1)		
Jun 7	American Family Insurance Championship	Wisconsin	3,000,000	(Northern Ireland) Darren Clarke (6) and (United States) Ben Crane (1)		Team event
Jun 14	Principal Charity Classic	Iowa	2,000,000	(United States) Zach Johnson (2)		
Jun 28	Dick's Open	New York	2,200,000	(United States) Dicky Pride (2)		
Jul 5	U.S. Senior Open	Ohio	4,000,000	(Republic of Ireland) Pádraig Harrington (12)		Senior major championship
Jul 12	Kaulig Companies Championship	Ohio	3,500,000	(United States) Zach Johnson (3)		PGA Tour Champions major championship
Jul 26	ISPS Handa Senior Open	Scotland	2,850,000	(United States) Jerry Kelly (14)		Senior major championship
Aug 2	Portugal Invitational	Portugal	3,000,000	(United States) Zach Johnson (4)	EST	New tournament
Aug 16	Boeing Classic	Washington	2,300,000	(United States) Stewart Cink (9)		
Aug 23	Rogers Charity Classic	Canada	2,500,000	(New Zealand) Steven Alker (12)		
Aug 30	The Ally Challenge	Michigan	2,200,000	(New Zealand) Steven Alker (13)		
Sep 13	Sanford International	South Dakota	2,200,000	(United States) Zach Johnson (5)		
Sep 20	PURE Insurance Championship	California	2,400,000	(United States) Zach Johnson (6)		
Oct 4	Jefferson Lehigh Valley Classic	Pennsylvania	2,300,000	(New Zealand) Steven Alker (14)		New tournament
Oct 11	Constellation Furyk and Friends	Florida	2,200,000	(United States) Vaughn Taylor (1)		
Oct 18	SAS Championship	North Carolina	2,100,000	(Fiji) Vijay Singh (6)		
Oct 25	Stifel Charity Classic	Missouri	2,300,000	(Slovakia) Rory Sabbatini (1)		Charles Schwab Cup playoff event
Nov 1	Simmons Bank Championship	Arkansas	2,300,000	(South Africa) Darren Fichardt (1)		Charles Schwab Cup playoff event
Nov 15	Charles Schwab Cup Championship	Arizona	3,000,000	(United States) Stewart Cink (10)		Charles Schwab Cup playoff event

=== Unofficial events ===
The following events were sanctioned by PGA Tour Champions, but did not carry official money, nor were wins official.

Date	Tournament	Location	Purse ($)	Winners	Notes
Dec 6	Skechers World Champions Cup	Florida			Team event
Dec 20	PNC Championship	Florida	1,085,000		Team event

== Charles Schwab Cup ==
The Charles Schwab Cup was based on tournament results during the season, calculated using a points-based system.

Position	Player	Points
1	(United States) Stewart Cink	4,999,830
2	(United States) Zach Johnson	4,357,828
3	(New Zealand) Steven Alker	2,789,778
4	(South Africa) Retief Goosen	2,168,567
5	(Slovakia) Rory Sabbatini	1,999,921

== Money list ==
The money list was based on prize money won during the season, calculated in U.S. dollars.

Position	Player	Prize money ($)
1	(United States) Stewart Cink	4,399,265
2	(United States) Zach Johnson	3,836,098
3	(New Zealand) Steven Alker	2,527,433
4	(South Africa) Retief Goosen	1,908,567
5	(Republic of Ireland) Pádraig Harrington	1,846,269

== Awards ==
Award	Winner	Ref.
Player of the Year (Jack Nicklaus Trophy)		
Rookie of the Year (Hale Irwin Award)		
Scoring leader (Byron Nelson Award)	(United States) Zach Johnson	
