= The Ally Challenge =

Coordinates: 42.9013°N 83.6006°W

The Ally Challenge presented by McLaren

Tournament information
- Location: Grand Blanc Township, Michigan
- Established: 2018
- Course: Warwick Hills Golf and Country Club
- Par: 72
- Length: 7,112 yards (6,503 m)
- Tour: PGA Tour Champions
- Format: Stroke play
- Prize fund: US$2,200,000
- Month played: August

Tournament record score
- Aggregate: 199 Joe Durant (2021); 199 Stewart Cink (2024)
- To par: −17 as above

Current champion
- (New Zealand) Steven Alker

Location map
- Location in the United States Location in Michigan

The Ally Challenge presented by McLaren is a PGA Tour Champions event at Warwick Hills Golf and Country Club in Grand Blanc Township, Michigan, just south of Flint, which debuted in September 2018. The tournament is sponsored by Grand Blanc-based McLaren Health Care. Detroit-based Ally Financial is the title sponsor. Beyond the tournament, the Ally Challenge event includes a pro-am on Wednesday and Thursday, Friday's Concert @ 17, and Saturday's Ally Community Concert.

Since its inception in 2018, the tournament has donated more than $9.6 million to support charity.

== Background ==
Previously, the area had the Buick Open from 1958 through 2009 at the Warwick Hills Golf Club, as one of six former PGA Tour sites hosting PGA Tour Champions events. Since that tournament left, the golf club had been looking to get a replace in a PGA Tour Champions event. The main issue was finding a title sponsor.

== History ==
The Ally Challenge was announced by the PGA on August 26, 2017 as a PGA Tour Champions tournament playing September 10–16, 2018. An agreement is in place for the $2 million purse tournament until 2020. The Ally Challenge would also included a pro-am on Wednesday and Thursday.

On November 10, 2017, the tournament announced McLaren Health Care as presenting sponsor. Plus, they indicated tickets were on sale, a Big & Rich concert would be held after the first round and a 5K run would also be held. The Birdies for Charities fundraising program was announced in May 2018 for additional 501(c)3 charity to join. The 5K run/walk was announced on June 22, 2018 to be sponsor by Adidas as the Adidas 5K Challenge held before the second round with benefiting non-profits as the Community Foundation of Greater Flint and Junior Achievement of Southeastern Michigan.

The Genesee County Board of Commissioners embroiled the tournament in a controversy over their April 2, 2018 approval, 7–1, of using veterans millage funds towards sponsoring the event as "outreach". With the sponsorship, the county would get free access for veterans to the tournament and a "Patriot Pavilion" at the 18th fairway for all active and reserve military, veterans and their dependents. On April 9, 2018, after a commissioner sponsored petition with 500 signatures and an hour of mostly veterans speaking against the sponsorship, the board reversed it vote, initially 6–2–1 before voting switching made it unanimous.

Paul Broadhurst was the inaugural 2018 tournament winner with a 15-under-par 201 score to beat Brandt Jobe by two strokes. All three rounds of the tournament was broadcast on the Golf Channel.

On August 2, 2020, major champion Jim Furyk won the tournament in his PGA Tour Champions debut, becoming the first golfer to have won the former Buick Open held here to win The Ally Challenge.

== Winners ==
Year	Winner	Score	To par	Margin of victory	Runner-up	Purse ($)	Winner's share ($)	Ref.
2026	(New Zealand) Steven Alker	201	−15	3 strokes	(South Africa) Retief Goosen	2,200,000	330,000	
2025	(United States) Stewart Cink (2)	201	−15	Playoff	(South Africa) Ernie Els	2,200,000	330,000	
2024	(United States) Stewart Cink	199	−17	4 strokes	(South Korea) K. J. Choi	2,200,000	330,000	
2023	(Fiji) Vijay Singh	202	−14	1 stroke	(United States) Jeff Maggert	2,200,000	330,000	
2022	(United States) Steve Stricker	201	−15	1 stroke	(United States) Brett Quigley	2,000,000	300,000	
2021	(United States) Joe Durant	199	−17	1 stroke	(Germany) Bernhard Langer	2,000,000	300,000	
2020	(United States) Jim Furyk	202	−14	2 strokes	(South Africa) Retief Goosen	2,000,000	300,000	
2019	(United States) Jerry Kelly	200	−16	2 strokes	(United States) Woody Austin	2,000,000	300,000	
2018	(England) Paul Broadhurst	201	−15	2 strokes	(United States) Brandt Jobe	2,000,000	300,000	
