= Warwick Hills Golf and Country Club =

Private country club in Grand Blanc Township, Michigan

Coordinates: 42.8997354°N 83.5954857°W

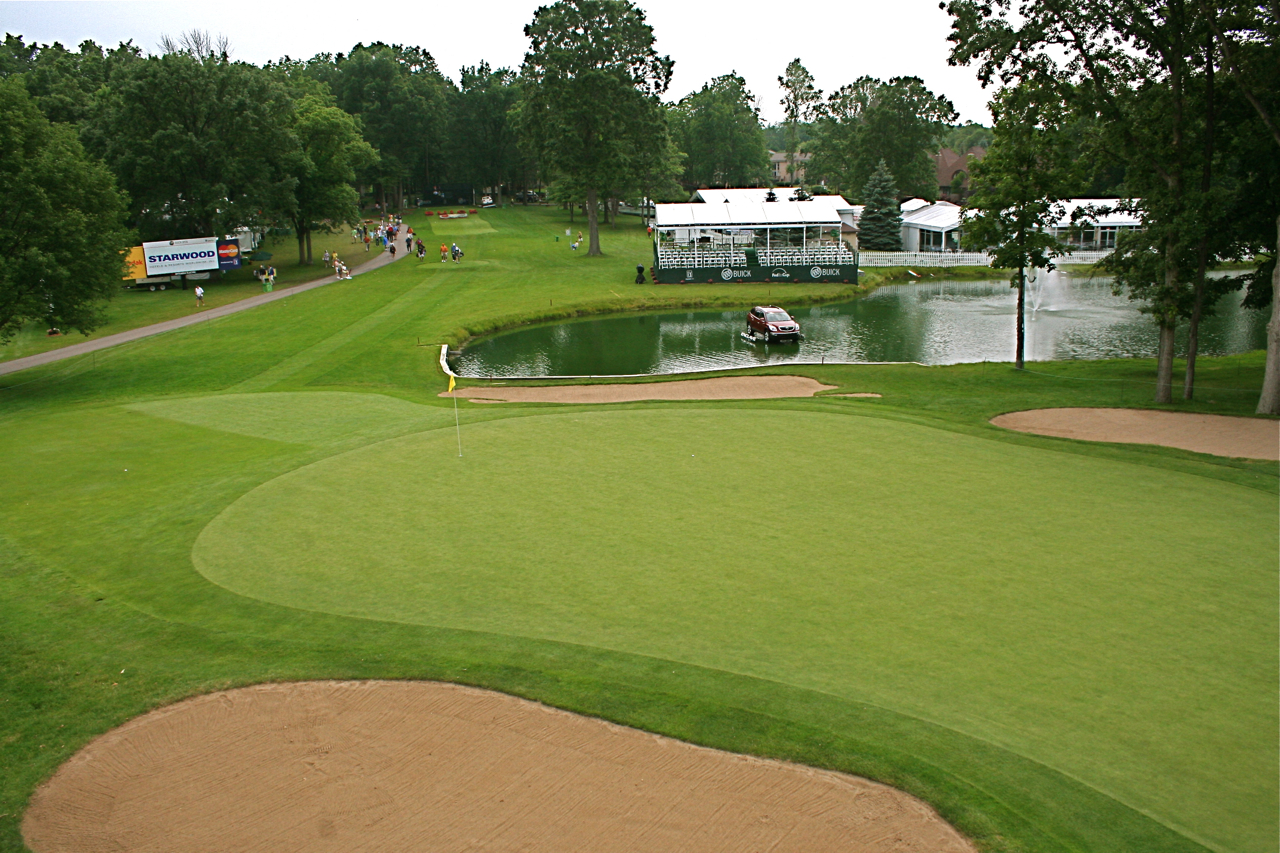
- No. 17
- Interactive map of Warwick Hills Golf and Country Club

Club information
- Location: Grand Blanc Township, Michigan
- Established: 1957
- Tota holes: 18
- Tournaments: The Ally Challenge (2018-); Buick Open (1958–2009)
- Website: www.warwickhills.org
- Designed by: Joe Lee
- Par: 72
- Length: 7,112 yards (6,503 m)
- Course rating: 74.5 (black)
- Slope rating: 136 (black)
- Course record: 61 (Tiger Woods and Billy Mayfair)

Warwick Hills Golf and Country Club is a private country club located at 9057 South Saginaw Road in Grand Blanc Township, Michigan, a suburb of Flint, Michigan, United States. From 1958 to 2009, Warwick Hills was home to the PGA Tour's Buick Open tournament. Since 2018, it has been host to the Ally Challenge event on the PGA Tour Champions. The course was opened in June 1957. The country club also participates in a caddie program.

The Warwick Hills golf course plays to a par of 72 with a length of 7112 from the championship tees. Tiger Woods and Billy Mayfair jointly hold the course record of 61.

That tournament ended after 2009 because of the government seizure of General Motors leading to cessation of golf sponsorship, thus ending the PGA Tour's association with Warwick Hills. The Ally Challenge was first played at the course in 2018.

In 2009, a Michigan Historical Marker about the Buick Open was erected at the course.
