= Stephen Allan =

Australian professional golfer (born 1973)

Personal information
- Full name: Stephen Douglas Allan
- Nationality: Australia
- Born: 18 October 1973 (age 53) Melbourne, Australia
- Height: 5 ft 11 in (1.80 m)
- Weight: 180 lb (82 kg; 13 st)
- Spouse: Bridget Allan
- Children: 4

Career
- Sport: Golf
- Turned professional: 1996
- Current tour: PGA Tour Champions
- Former tours: PGA Tour; European Tour; PGA Tour of Australasia; Web.com Tour
- Professional wins: 6
- Highest ranking: 93 (9 August 1998)

Number of wins by tour
- European Tour: 1
- PGA Tour of Australasia: 1
- PGA Tour Champions: 3
- Other: 1

Best results in major championships
- Masters Tournament: DNP
- PGA Championship: DNP
- U.S. Open: T28: 2005
- The Open Championship: T49: 1999

Stephen Douglas Allan (born 18 October 1973) is an Australian professional golfer.

== Early life ==
In 1973, Allan was born in Melbourne, Victoria. His parents emigrated from Edinburgh, Scotland three years before he was born.

== Professional career ==
Allan turned professional in 1996 and was a member of the European Tour from 1997 to 2000. In 1998, his second season in Europe, he won the German Open and finished sixteenth on the Order of Merit, and that remains his most successful year. His other professional win came in his home country, at the 2002 Australian Open. From 2001 to 2005 he was a member of the U.S.-based PGA Tour, with his best finishes being second placings at the Greater Milwaukee Open in 2003, and the Reno-Tahoe Open in 2004.

In 2006, he played on the Nationwide Tour in the United States, before regaining his PGA Tour card at the 2006 Qualifying School.

== Amateur wins ==
- 1995 New South Wales Medal, Lake Macquarie Amateur

== Professional wins (6) ==
=== European Tour wins (1) ===
No.	Date	Tournament	Winning score	Margin of victory	Runners-up
1	9 Aug 1998	German Open	−8 (72-71-68-69=280)	1 stroke	(Spain) Ignacio Garrido, (Republic of Ireland) Pádraig Harrington, (England) Mark Roe, (England) Steve Webster

=== PGA Tour of Australasia wins (1) ===
Legend
Flagship events (1)
Other PGA Tour of Australasia (0)

No.	Date	Tournament	Winning score	Margin of victory	Runners-up
1	24 Nov 2002	Holden Australian Open	−12 (66-64-68=198) (Note: Shortened to 54 holes due to weather.)	1 stroke	(Australia) Aaron Baddeley, (United States) Rich Beem, (Australia) Craig Parry

=== PGA Tour Champions wins (3) ===
No.	Date	Tournament	Winning score	Margin of victory	Runner-up
1	30 Mar 2025	Galleri Classic	−15 (69-65-67=201)	1 stroke	(United States) Tag Ridings
2	13 Jul 2025	Dick's Open	−18 (63-69-66=198)	4 strokes	(United States) Jason Carron
3	10 Aug 2025	Boeing Classic	−15 (68-68-65=201)	1 stroke	(United States) Stewart Cink

=== PGA of Australia Legends Tour wins (1) ===
- 2023 New South Wales Golf Club Legends Pro-Am

== Playoff record ==
PGA Tour playoff record (0–1)

No.	Year	Tournament	Opponents	Result
1	2004	Reno–Tahoe Open	(United States) Hunter Mahan, (United States) Scott McCarron, (United States) Vaughn Taylor	Taylor won with birdie on first extra hole

== Results in major championships ==
Tournament	1996	1997	1998	1999
U.S. Open				T42
The Open Championship	CUT		CUT	T49

Tournament	2000	2001	2002	2003	2004	2005	2006	2007	2008	2009
U.S. Open					CUT	T28				CUT
The Open Championship										

Tournament	2010	2011	2012	2013	2014	2015	2016	2017	2018	2019
U.S. Open	CUT									
The Open Championship										

Tournament	2020	2021
U.S. Open		CUT
The Open Championship	NT	

Did not play

CUT = missed the half-way cut
"T" = tied
NT = No tournament due to COVID-19 pandemic
Note: Allan never played in the Masters Tournament or the PGA Championship.

== Results in The Players Championship ==
Tournament	2004	2005
The Players Championship	CUT	CUT

CUT = missed the halfway cut

== Team appearances ==
Amateur

- Australian Men's Interstate Teams Matches (representing Victoria): 1993 (winners), 1994 (winners), 1995

== See also ==
- 2000 PGA Tour Qualifying School graduates
- 2001 PGA Tour Qualifying School graduates
- 2006 PGA Tour Qualifying School graduates
