= Zach Johnson =

American professional golfer (born 1976)

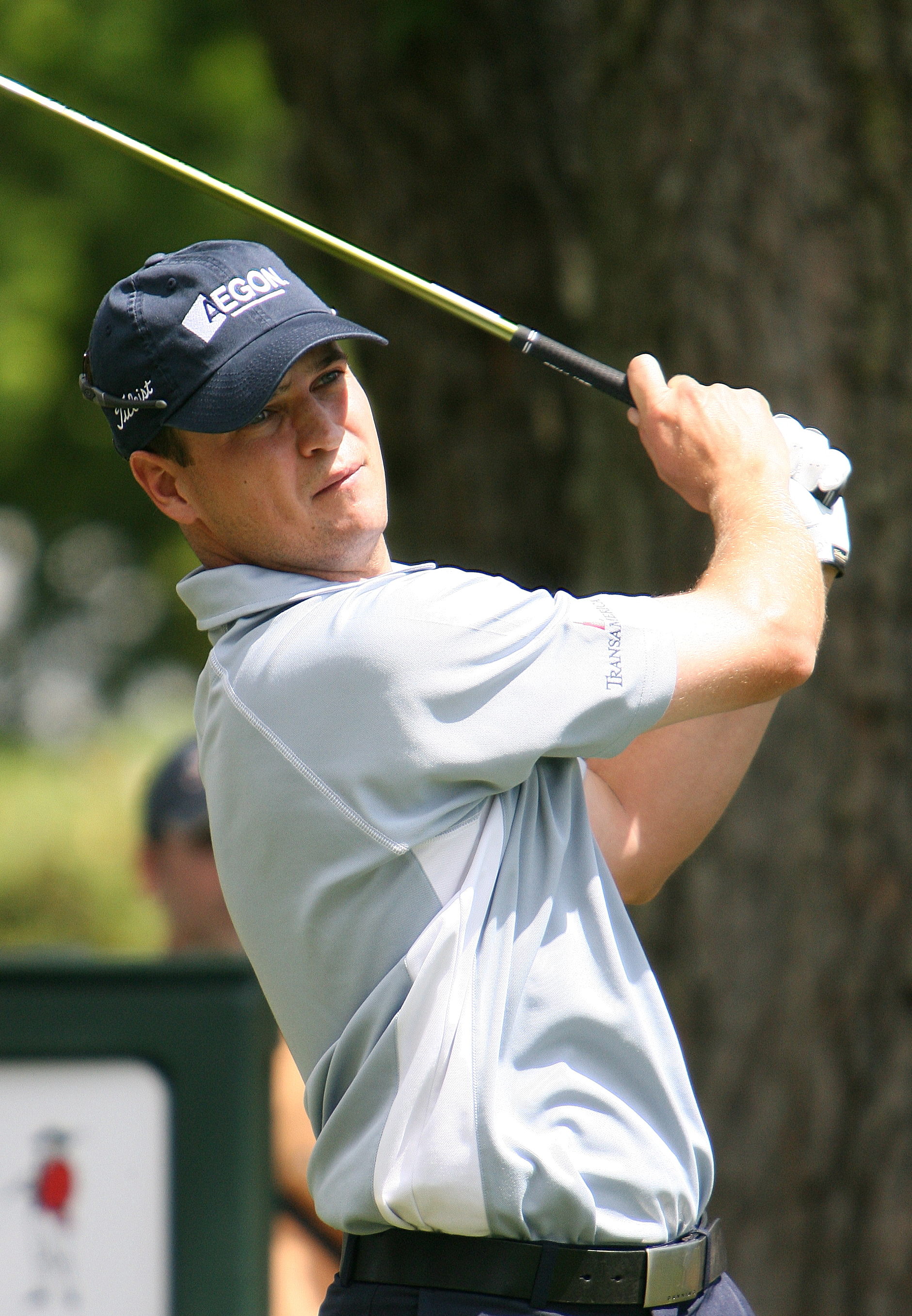

Personal information
- Full name: Zachary Harris Johnson
- Nickname: Zatch
- Nationality: United States
- Born: February 24, 1976 (age 50) Iowa City, Iowa, U.S.
- Height: 5 ft 11 in (1.80 m)
- Weight: 160 lb (73 kg; 11 st)
- Spouse: Kim Barclay (m. 2003)
- Children: 3

Career
- Sport: Golf
- College: Drake University
- Turned professional: 1998
- Current tour: PGA Tour
- Former tours: Nationwide Tour; NGA Hooters Tour
- Professional wins: 32
- Highest ranking: 6 (January 12, 2014)

Number of wins by tour
- PGA Tour: 12
- European Tour: 2
- Korn Ferry Tour: 2
- PGA Tour Champions: 6
- European Senior Tour: 1
- Other: 12

Best results in major championships (wins: 2)
- Masters Tournament: Won: 2007
- PGA Championship: T3: 2010
- U.S. Open: T8: 2016, 2020
- The Open Championship: Won: 2015

Achievements and awards
- Nationwide Tour money list winner: 2003
- Nationwide Tour Player of the Year: 2003
- Payne Stewart Award: 2020
- PGA Tour Champions Byron Nelson Award: 2026

Zachary Harris Johnson (born February 24, 1976) is an American professional golfer who has 12 victories on the PGA Tour, including two major championships, the 2007 Masters and the 2015 Open Championship. At the 2023 Ryder Cup, Johnson captained the U.S. squad against Europe in Rome, Italy.

== Early life ==
The son of a chiropractor, Johnson was born in Iowa City, Iowa, and raised in Cedar Rapids, the eldest of Dave and Julie Johnson's three children. Playing many sports as a youth (baseball, basketball, football, and soccer), Johnson took up golf at age 10 and developed his skills at Elmcrest Country Club. He played number-two on the Regis High School golf team and led them to an Iowa 3A state championship in 1992, his sophomore year.

Following graduation from high school in 1994, Johnson enrolled at Drake University in Des Moines. As the number-two player on the Drake golf team, he led the Bulldogs to three NCAA regional meets and two Missouri Valley championships. Johnson's uncle, Tom Harris, qualified for the 1975 NAIA national tournament.

== Professional career ==
Johnson turned professional in 1998 and played on the developmental tour circuit, including the now-defunct Prairie Golf Tour, Buy.com Tour (now Korn Ferry Tour), and Hooters Tour, where he won the final three regular-season events in 2001. In 2003, he topped the money list on the Nationwide Tour with then record earnings of $494,882, earning an automatic promotion to the PGA Tour. Johnson won his first PGA Tour event in 2004 at the BellSouth Classic outside of Atlanta, one stroke ahead of runner-up Mark Hensby. In 2006, Johnson recorded a number of impressive results, with two runner-ups and a third at the WGC-Accenture Match Play Championship. As a result, he qualified for the U.S. Ryder Cup team for the first time in 2006, finishing ninth on the U.S. points list.

In April 2007, Johnson won his first major title at the Masters Tournament in Augusta, Georgia, two strokes ahead of runners-up Tiger Woods, Retief Goosen, and Rory Sabbatini. His score of 289 (+1) tied Sam Snead (1954) and Jack Burke Jr. (1956) for the highest winning score at the Masters. His victory took Johnson from #56 to #15 in the world rankings; he was the first outside the top 50 in the world rankings to win the Masters in the history of the rankings (introduced 1986). After winning, he mentioned his Christian faith and thanked God, saying: "This being Easter, I cannot help but believe my Lord and Savior, Jesus Christ was walking with me. I owe this to Him." Six weeks after winning the Masters, Johnson won for the third time on tour at the AT&T Classic in a playoff over Ryuji Imada. Following the win, Johnson moved to 13th in the world rankings. His next PGA Tour victory, and first outside the state of Georgia, came at the Valero Texas Open in October 2008, where he finished with weekend rounds of 62 and 64 to finish two strokes ahead of a chasing pack of players.

Johnson won the Sony Open in Hawaii in January 2009 for his fifth victory on the PGA Tour, and successfully defended his title at the Valero Texas Open in May with a playoff victory over James Driscoll. With a third-round 60, Johnson became the first player to shoot 60 twice on the PGA Tour, having done so previously at the 2007 Tour Championship. The win was Johnson's sixth on tour. Other highlights in 2009 include a tie for 2nd place at the John Deere Classic and a solo 3rd-place finish at the Arnold Palmer Invitational. He finished the season ranked a career best fourth on the money list. In 2010, Johnson started the season solidly on the PGA Tour, making ten of his first eleven cuts without any significant results. Then in June 2010, he won the Crowne Plaza Invitational at Colonial, his seventh PGA Tour victory. Johnson only missed two cuts all year en route to qualifying for the season ending Tour Championship and the 2010 U.S. Ryder Cup team, his second appearance in the event.

In 2012, Johnson won the Crowne Plaza Invitational at Colonial for the second time in his career. He made a five-foot (1.5 m) putt on the last hole for an apparent three-shot victory, but a ruling on the final hole resulted in a two-stroke penalty. It did not affect the outcome, with the only difference being Johnson signing for a double-bogey instead of a par on the final hole, and winning by a single stroke over Jason Dufner. He jumped to 3rd in the FedEx Cup standings and returned to the world top 20 with this victory. Johnson moved to second in the FedEx Cup standings in 2012 with a playoff win on July 15 at the John Deere Classic. Johnson defeated Troy Matteson, who started the day up four shots on Johnson and had led the tournament since the first round, with a birdie on the second hole of their playoff. Johnson also started the day behind three-time defending champion Steve Stricker, who was three shots behind Matteson. It was Johnson's second win on the year after winning at Colonial Country Club. Mike Bender, Johnson's swing coach, also caddied for the week while usual caddie Damon Green played in the U.S. Senior Open.

At the 2012 Open Championship, played at Royal Lytham & St Annes Golf Club in Lancashire, England, Johnson finished at even par for the tournament (280), tied for ninth, seven shots behind winner Ernie Els.

In 2013, Johnson, in defense of his John Deere Classic title, lost in a three-man sudden-death playoff to Jordan Spieth at the fifth extra hole, after he bogeyed the final hole of regulation play with a one shot lead. In the playoff, all three players, Johnson, Spieth and David Hearn, had chances to win with Johnson's coming at the second extra hole, but he failed to convert the putt. Spieth won with par at the fifth extra hole after Johnson hit his second shot into the water and could only make bogey. The following week, Johnson opened up the 2013 Open Championship at Muirfield, with a five-under-par round of 66 to hold the lead by one stroke over Rafa Cabrera-Bello and Mark O'Meara. He finished the tournament in a tie for 6th place. He continued solid play for the rest of the summer, finishing in the top-10 in six of the next seven tournaments he would enter, including an 8th-place finish at the PGA Championship, making it back to back top-10 finishes at major events. In September, Johnson captured the BMW Championship for his tenth career victory and first FedEx Cup victory of his career.

In December 2013, Johnson attained a playoff victory over Tiger Woods at the Northwestern Mutual World Challenge. This win moved him into the top ten of the Official World Golf Ranking for the first time in his career. Johnson captured his 11th career victory in January 2014 with a win at the Hyundai Tournament of Champions. With the win, Johnson moved up to 7th in the Official World Golf Ranking, and claimed a career high 6th due to 8th place in the following week.

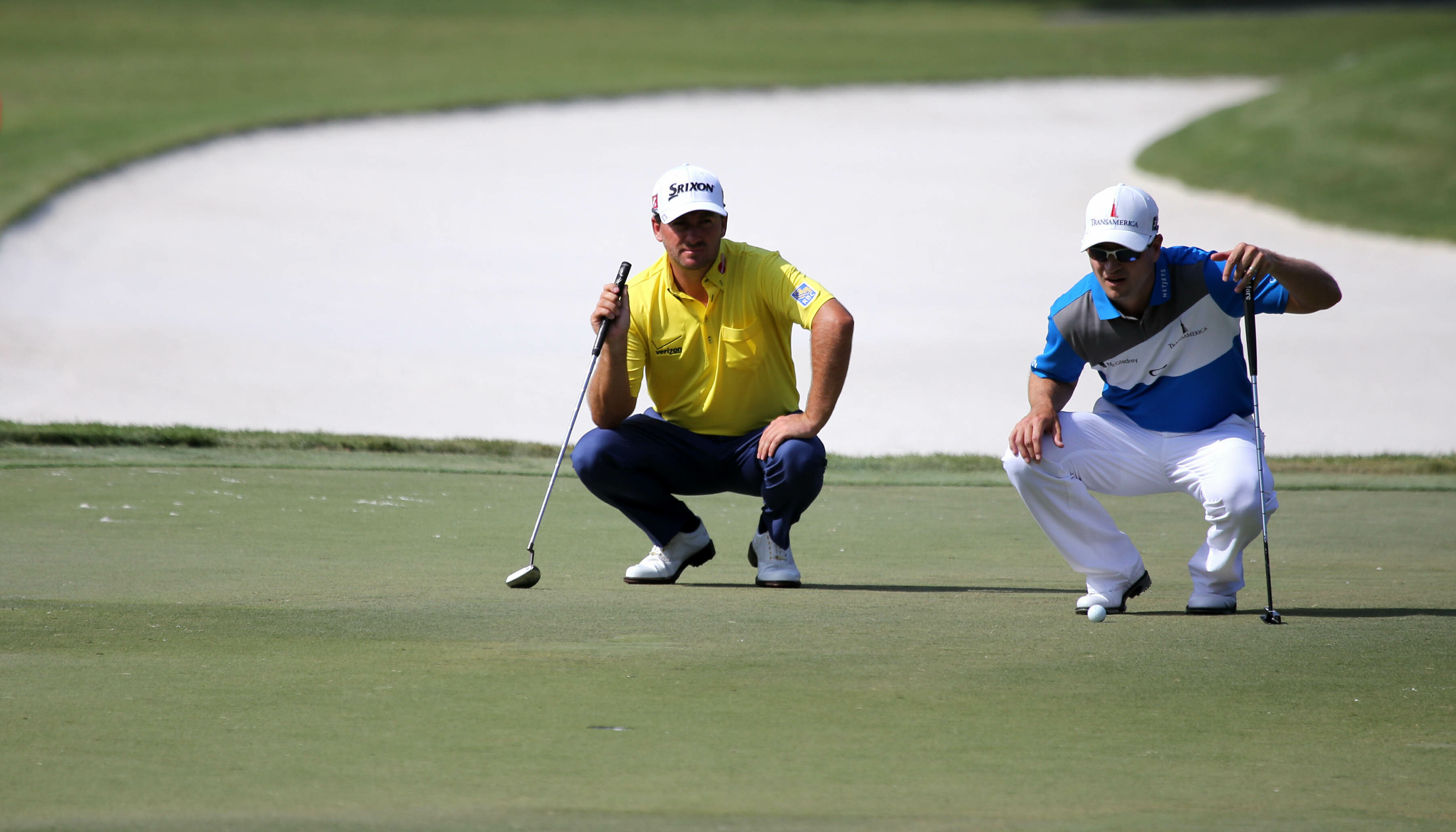
Johnson with Graeme McDowell at the 2014 Players Championship. Johnson finished tied for 26th.

At the 2014 U.S. Open, Johnson had a hole in one on the 172 yard par-3 9th hole. It was the 44th hole in one in U.S. Open history, and just the second at Pinehurst No. 2.

On July 20, 2015, Johnson beat Louis Oosthuizen and Marc Leishman in a four-hole playoff to win the Open Championship at St Andrews for his 12th PGA Tour win and second major. He became only the sixth golfer to win majors at Augusta and St. Andrews, the others being Sam Snead, Jack Nicklaus, Nick Faldo, Seve Ballesteros, and Woods.

Johnson is one of only two players (with Phil Mickelson) to have twice shot a round of 60 on the PGA Tour, though Jim Furyk shot rounds of 58 and 59.

In July 2019, Johnson fell out of the Official World Golf Ranking top 100 players for the first time since April 2004, when his first tour victory at the 2004 BellSouth Classic vaulted him from 126th in the world to 49th. From 2004 to 2018, Johnson made at least $1.6 million every season, and he grabbed wins in all but one season between 2007 and 2015. The only year he didn't, 2011, Johnson still managed to finish T-6 or better in four events, and he also finished solo second at the Hero World Challenge.

In August 2019, Johnson failed to make the FedEx Cup Playoffs for the first time since the playoffs were introduced in 2007. "Extreme disappointment. That's about all I've got at this point is just extreme disappointment," Johnson said. Once a fixture near the top of the rankings, Johnson slipped to 126th in the world. He remained fully exempt for the 2019–20 PGA Tour season in the final part of a five-year exemption for winning the 2015 Open Championship, an insurance that Johnson said allowed him to play with added "freedom" during a lean year.

In July 2021, Johnson was forced to withdraw from 2021 Open Championship after testing positive for COVID-19, ending his streak at participating in 69 consecutive majors.

In 2026, Johnson joined the PGA Tour Champions after turning 50. He won six events that year including his first senior major, the Kaulig Companies Championship.

== Personal life ==
Johnson and his wife, the former Kim Barclay, were members of First Baptist Church in Texas Orlando.

He was raised a Catholic, but joined his wife's church prior to their marriage in 2003. They have two sons and a daughter. They lived in Lake Mary, Florida and now reside in St. Simons, Georgia.

The Zach Johnson Foundation is dedicated to helping children and their families in Cedar Rapids, Iowa. One program created by Johnson and his wife Kim helped to raise $700,000 for community agencies serving children in need. He has stated: "This Foundation will fulfill a dream of mine and Kim's to give back to Cedar Rapids in a long-lasting, meaningful way."

== Awards and honors ==
- In 2003, Johnson earned the Nationwide Tour's money list title
- In 2003, Johnson earned the Nationwide Tour's Player of the Year honors
- In 2020, Johnson won the Payne Stewart Award.

== Professional wins (32) ==
=== PGA Tour wins (12) ===
Legend
Major championships (2)
FedEx Cup playoff events (1)
Other PGA Tour (9)

No.	Date	Tournament	Winning score	To par	Margin of victory	Runner(s)-up
1	Apr 4, 2004	BellSouth Classic	69-66-68-72=275	−13	1 stroke	(Australia) Mark Hensby
2	Apr 8, 2007	Masters Tournament	71-73-76-69=289	+1	2 strokes	(South Africa) Retief Goosen, (South Africa) Rory Sabbatini, (United States) Tiger Woods
3	May 20, 2007	AT&T Classic (2)	71-66-69-67=273	−15	Playoff	(Japan) Ryuji Imada
4	Oct 12, 2008	Valero Texas Open	69-66-62-64=261	−19	2 strokes	(South Korea) Charlie Wi, (New Zealand) Tim Wilkinson, (United States) Mark Wilson
5	Jan 18, 2009	Sony Open in Hawaii	69-65-66-65=265	−15	2 strokes	(Australia) Adam Scott, (United States) David Toms
6	May 17, 2009	Valero Texas Open (2)	68-67-60-70=265	−15	Playoff	(United States) James Driscoll
7	May 30, 2010	Crowne Plaza Invitational at Colonial	65-66-64-64=259	−21	3 strokes	(England) Brian Davis
8	May 27, 2012	Crowne Plaza Invitational at Colonial (2)	64-67-65-72=268	−12	1 stroke	(United States) Jason Dufner
9	Jul 15, 2012	John Deere Classic	68-65-66-65=264	−20	Playoff	(United States) Troy Matteson
10	Sep 16, 2013	BMW Championship	64-69-70-65=268	−16	2 strokes	(United States) Nick Watney
11	Jan 6, 2014	Hyundai Tournament of Champions	67-66-74-66=273	−19	1 stroke	(United States) Jordan Spieth
12	Jul 20, 2015	The Open Championship	66-71-70-66=273	−15	Playoff	(Australia) Marc Leishman, (South Africa) Louis Oosthuizen

PGA Tour playoff record (4–1)

No.	Year	Tournament	Opponent(s)	Result
1	2007	AT&T Classic	(Japan) Ryuji Imada	Won with birdie on first extra hole
2	2009	Valero Texas Open	(United States) James Driscoll	Won with birdie on first extra hole
3	2012	John Deere Classic	(United States) Troy Matteson	Won with birdie on second extra hole
4	2013	John Deere Classic	(Canada) David Hearn, (United States) Jordan Spieth	Spieth won with par on fifth extra hole
5	2015	The Open Championship	(Australia) Marc Leishman, (South Africa) Louis Oosthuizen	Won four-hole aggregate playoff; Johnson: −1 (3-3-5-4=15), Oosthuizen: E (3-4-5-4=16), Leishman: +2 (5-4-5-4=18)

=== Nationwide Tour wins (2) ===
No.	Date	Tournament	Winning score	To par	Margin of victory	Runner-up
1	Apr 27, 2003	Rheem Classic	65-70-71-66=272	−8	Playoff	(United States) Steve Haskins
2	Sep 7, 2003	Envirocare Utah Classic	68-69-65-65=267	−21	1 stroke	(United States) Bobby Gage

Nationwide Tour playoff record (1–1)

No.	Year	Tournament	Opponent	Result
1	2003	Rheem Classic	(United States) Steve Haskins	Won with birdie on first extra hole
2	2003	Henrico County Open	(Australia) Mark Hensby	Lost to birdie on first extra hole

=== NGA Hooters Tour wins (4) ===
No.	Date	Tournament	Winning score	To par	Margin of victory	Runner(s)-up
1	Aug 26, 2001	Hooters Championship	65-63-65-69=262	−26	3 strokes	(United States) Joey Maxon
2	Sep 2, 2001	Pars and Cars Classic	66-66-70-65=267	−17	3 strokes	(Brazil) Alexandre Rocha
3	Sep 23, 2001	Camellia City Classic	69-66-65-70=270	−18	1 stroke	(United States) Brent Winston
4	Apr 21, 2002	Oklahoma Classic	68-65-66-73=272	−12	5 strokes	(United States) Eric Epperson, (United States) Daniel Stone

=== Prairie Golf Tour wins (3) ===
- 1998 1 event
- 1999 2 events

=== Other wins (5) ===
No.	Date	Tournament	Winning score	To par	Margin of victory	Runner(s)-up
1	Jun 10, 2001	Greater Cedar Rapids Open	66-71-71=208	−8	2 strokes	(United States) Jeff Schmid
2	Jul 15, 2001	Iowa Open	64-65-67=196	−20	3 strokes	(United States) Brian Smock
3	Jul 14, 2002	Iowa Open (2)	65-63-65=193	−23	4 strokes	(United States) George McNeill
4	Jun 21, 2011	CVS Caremark Charity Classic (with (United States) Matt Kuchar)	58-60=118	−24	2 strokes	(United States) Davis Love III and (United States) Morgan Pressel
5	Dec 8, 2013	Northwestern Mutual World Challenge	67-68-72-68=275	−13	Playoff	(United States) Tiger Woods

Other playoff record (1–0)

No.	Year	Tournament	Opponent	Result
1	2013	Northwestern Mutual World Challenge	(United States) Tiger Woods	Won with par on first extra hole

=== PGA Tour Champions wins (6) ===
Legend
PGA Tour Champions major championships (1)
Other PGA Tour Champions (5)

No.	Date	Tournament	Winning score	To par	Margin of victory	Runner(s)-up
1	Mar 8, 2026	James Hardie Pro Football Hall of Fame Invitational	70-66-69=205	−11	4 strokes	(United States) Stewart Cink, (United States) George McNeill
2	Jun 14, 2026	Principal Charity Classic	69-63-67=199	−17	4 strokes	(South Africa) Retief Goosen, (Australia) Richard Green
3	Jul 12, 2026	Kaulig Companies Championship	67-67-63-68=265	−15	6 strokes	(United States) Boo Weekley
4	Aug 2, 2026	Portugal Invitational^{1}	64-68-65=197	−19	2 strokes	(United States) Stewart Cink
5	Sep 13, 2026	Sanford International	69-64-66=199	−11	1 stroke	(United States) Ben Crane
6	Sep 20, 2026	PURE Insurance Championship	69-68-65=202	−14	2 strokes	(New Zealand) Steven Alker, (Slovakia) Rory Sabbatini, (Sweden) Henrik Stenson

^{1}Co-sanctioned by the European Senior Tour

== Major championships ==
=== Wins (2) ===
Year	Championship	54 holes	Winning score	Margin	Runners-up
2007	Masters Tournament	2 shot deficit	+1 (71-73-76-69=289)	2 strokes	(South Africa) Retief Goosen, (South Africa) Rory Sabbatini, (United States) Tiger Woods
2015	The Open Championship	3 shot deficit	−15 (66-70-71-66=273)	Playoff^{1}	(Australia) Marc Leishman, (South Africa) Louis Oosthuizen

^{1}Defeated Leishman and Oosthuizen in a four-hole aggregate playoff: Johnson (3-3-5-4=15), Oosthuizen (3-4-5-4=16), Leishman (5-4-5-4=18)

=== Results timeline ===
Results not in chronological order in 2020.

Tournament	2004	2005	2006	2007	2008	2009
Masters Tournament		CUT	T32	1	T20	CUT
U.S. Open	T48	CUT	CUT	T45	CUT	CUT
The Open Championship	CUT	CUT	CUT	T20	T51	T47
PGA Championship	T37	T17	CUT	CUT	CUT	T10

Tournament	2010	2011	2012	2013	2014	2015	2016	2017	2018
Masters Tournament	42	CUT	T32	T35	CUT	T9	CUT	CUT	T36
U.S. Open	T77	T30	T41	CUT	T40	T72	T8	T27	T12
The Open Championship	T76	T16	T9	T6	T47	1	T12	T14	T17
PGA Championship	T3	T59	70	T8	T69	CUT	T33	T48	T19

Tournament	2019	2020	2021	2022	2023	2024	2025	2026
Masters Tournament	T58	T51	CUT	CUT	T34	CUT	T8	CUT
PGA Championship	T54	CUT	CUT	CUT	T58			
U.S. Open	T58	T8	CUT					
The Open Championship	CUT	NT		CUT	T55	CUT	CUT	

Win
Top 10
Did not play

CUT = missed the halfway cut
"T" = tied
NT = no tournament due to COVID-19 pandemic

=== Summary ===
Tournament	Wins	2nd	3rd	Top-5	Top-10	Top-25	Events	Cuts made
Masters Tournament	1	0	0	1	3	4	22	12
PGA Championship	0	0	1	1	3	5	20	13
U.S. Open	0	0	0	0	2	3	18	12
The Open Championship	1	0	0	1	3	8	20	13
Totals	2	0	1	3	11	20	80	50

- Most consecutive cuts made – 10 (2017 U.S. Open – 2019 U.S. Open)
- Longest streak of top-10s – 2 (2013 Open Championship – 2013 PGA)

== Results in The Players Championship ==
Tournament	2005	2006	2007	2008	2009
The Players Championship	T8	T58	T16	CUT	T32

Tournament	2010	2011	2012	2013	2014	2015	2016	2017	2018	2019
The Players Championship	T22	T12	T2	T19	T26	T13	T54	T48	T75	CUT

Tournament	2020	2021	2022
The Players Championship	C	T41	CUT

Top 10

CUT = missed the halfway cut
"T" indicates a tie for a place
C = Canceled after the first round due to the COVID-19 pandemic

== Results in World Golf Championships ==
Results not in chronological order prior to 2015.

Tournament	2004	2005	2006	2007	2008	2009	2010	2011	2012	2013	2014	2015	2016	2017	2018
Championship	10	T43	T45	T9	T9	T53	T37	T24	T17	T47	T16	T49	T47	T58	
Match Play		R64	3	R64	R64	R32	R32	R64	R64	R64	R64	T17	R16	R16	T36
Invitational	T22	T9	T36	T11	T16	T15	T33	T6	T40	T4	T23	T33	T10	2	T17
Champions															

Top 10
Did not play

QF, R16, R32, R64 = Round in which player lost in match play
"T" = tied
Note that the HSBC Champions did not become a WGC event until 2009.

== Senior major championships ==
=== Wins (1) ===
Year	Championship	54 holes	Winning score	Margin	Runner(s)-up
2026	Kaulig Companies Championship	4 stroke lead	−15 (67-67-63-68=265)	6 strokes	(United States) Boo Weekley

=== Results timeline ===
Tournament	2026
Senior PGA Championship	T8
The Tradition	
U.S. Senior Open	
Senior Players Championship	1
The Senior Open Championship	T7

Win
Top 10
Did not play

"T" indicates a tie for a place

== PGA Tour career summary ==
Season	Tournaments played	Cuts made	Wins (majors)	2nd	3rd	Top 10s	Best finish	Earnings ($)	Money list rank	Scoring ave (adjusted)
2001	1	0	0	0	0	0	-	-	-	71.46
2002	2	1	0	0	0	0	T17	57,000	-	71.16
2003	1	0	0	0	0	0	-	-	-	72.69
2004	30	24	1	0	2	5	1	2,417,685	19	70.18
2005	30	21	0	1	1	5	T2	1,796,441	39	70.38
2006	27	21	0	2	1	4	T2	2,452,250	24	70.42
2007	23	18	2 (1)	1	0	5	1	3,922,338	8	69.91
2008	25	19	1	0	0	3	1	1,615,123	53	70.60
2009	26	22	2	1	1	9	1	4,714,813	4	69.60
2010	25	23	1	0	1	3	1	2,916,993	19	70.53
2011	23	19	0	0	1	4	T3	1,880,406	44	69.97
2012	25	24	2	2	0	6	1	4,504,244	6	69.82
2013	24	20	1	1	1	8	1	4,044,509	9	70.10
2014	26	24	1	1	1	5	1	3,353,417	19	70.16
2015	25	20	1 (1)	0	1	10	1	4,801,487	8	69.73
2016	24	21	0	0	0	5	5	1,718,703	58	70.36
2017	23	17	0	1	0	4	2	2,362,968	40	70.39
2018	25	23	0	0	0	2	5	1,957,635	59	69.91
2019	19	13	0	0	0	1	T7	603,160	155	70.64
2020	18	12	0	0	0	1	T7	777,727	105	70.39
2021	24	18	0	0	0	3	T6	1,241,402	106	70.40
2022	23	10	0	0	0	0	T13	610,693	154	71.17
2023	22	13	0	0	0	0	T12	807,499	149	71.27
2024	18	10	0	0	0	0	T19	496,380	166	70.77
2025	17	8	0	0	0	1	T8	918,478	138	71.10
Career*	526	401	12 (2)	10	10	84	1	49,971,351	17	–

* As of the 2025 season.

== U.S. national team appearances ==
Professional

- World Cup: 2005
- Ryder Cup: 2006, 2010, 2012, 2014, 2016 (winners), 2023 (non-playing captain)
- Wendy's 3-Tour Challenge (representing PGA Tour): 2006 (winners)
- Presidents Cup: 2007 (winners), 2009 (winners), 2013 (winners), 2015 (winners)

Ryder Cup points record
2006	2008	2010	2012	2014	2016	Total
1.5	–	2	3	0.5	2	9

== See also ==
- 2003 Nationwide Tour graduates
