= 2025 PGA Tour Champions season =

Golf tour season

- Duration: January 16, 2025 – November 16, 2025
- Number of official events: 28
- Most wins: (Spain) Miguel Ángel Jiménez (4)
- Charles Schwab Cup: (United States) Stewart Cink
- Money list: (United States) Stewart Cink
- Player of the Year: (United States) Stewart Cink
- Rookie of the Year: (United States) Tommy Gainey

The 2025 PGA Tour Champions season was the 45th season of PGA Tour Champions (formerly the Senior PGA Tour and the Champions Tour), the main professional golf tour in the United States for men aged 50 and over.

== Schedule ==
The following table lists official events during the 2025 season.

Date	Tournament	Location	Purse (US$)	Winner (Note: The number in parentheses after each winner's name is the number of PGA Tour Champions events they had won up to and including that tournament. This information is only shown for PGA Tour Champions members.)	Notes
Jan 18	Mitsubishi Electric Championship at Hualalai	Hawaii	2,000,000	(South Africa) Ernie Els (7)	
Feb 8	Trophy Hassan II	Morocco	2,500,000	(Spain) Miguel Ángel Jiménez (14)	
Feb 16	Chubb Classic	Florida	1,800,000	(United States) Justin Leonard (1)	
Mar 9	Cologuard Classic	Arizona	2,200,000	(New Zealand) Steven Alker (9)	
Mar 23	Hoag Classic	California	2,000,000	(Spain) Miguel Ángel Jiménez (15)	
Mar 30	Galleri Classic	California	2,200,000	(Australia) Stephen Allan (1)	
Apr 6	James Hardie Pro-Football Hall of Fame Invitational	Florida	2,200,000	(Argentina) Ángel Cabrera (1)	New tournament
Apr 27	Mitsubishi Electric Classic	Georgia	2,000,000	(United States) Jerry Kelly (13)	
May 4	Insperity Invitational	Texas	3,000,000	(United States) Stewart Cink (2)	
May 19 (Note: Monday finish due to weather delays.)	Regions Tradition	Alabama	2,600,000	(Argentina) Ángel Cabrera (2)	PGA Tour Champions major championship
May 25	Senior PGA Championship	Maryland	3,000,000	(Argentina) Ángel Cabrera (3)	Senior major championship
Jun 1	Principal Charity Classic	Iowa	2,000,000	(Spain) Miguel Ángel Jiménez (16)	
Jun 8	American Family Insurance Championship	Wisconsin	3,000,000	(Denmark) Thomas Bjørn (1) and (Northern Ireland) Darren Clarke (5)	Team event
Jun 22	Kaulig Companies Championship	Ohio	3,500,000	(Spain) Miguel Ángel Jiménez (17)	PGA Tour Champions major championship
Jun 29	U.S. Senior Open	Colorado	4,000,000	(Republic of Ireland) Pádraig Harrington (10)	Senior major championship
Jul 13	Dick's Open	New York	2,200,000	(Australia) Stephen Allan (2)	
Jul 27	ISPS Handa Senior Open	England	2,850,000	(Republic of Ireland) Pádraig Harrington (11)	Senior major championship
Aug 10	Boeing Classic	Washington	2,300,000	(Australia) Stephen Allan (3)	
Aug 17	Rogers Charity Classic	Canada	2,500,000	(Australia) Richard Green (1)	
Aug 24	The Ally Challenge	Michigan	2,200,000	(United States) Stewart Cink (3)	
Sep 7	Stifel Charity Classic	Missouri	2,100,000	(Denmark) Thomas Bjørn (2)	
Sep 14	Sanford International	South Dakota	2,200,000	(South Africa) Retief Goosen (4)	
Sep 21	PURE Insurance Championship	California	2,400,000	(United States) Doug Barron (4)	
Oct 5	Constellation Furyk and Friends	Florida	2,100,000	(United States) Tommy Gainey (1)	
Oct 12	SAS Championship	North Carolina	2,100,000	(Germany) Alex Čejka (4)	
Oct 19	Dominion Energy Charity Classic	Virginia	2,300,000	(United States) Justin Leonard (2)	Charles Schwab Cup playoff event
Oct 26	Simmons Bank Championship	Arkansas	2,300,000	(New Zealand) Steven Alker (10)	Charles Schwab Cup playoff event
Nov 16	Charles Schwab Cup Championship	Arizona	3,000,000	(United States) Stewart Cink (4)	Charles Schwab Cup playoff event

=== Unofficial events ===
The following events were sanctioned by PGA Tour Champions, but did not carry official money, nor were wins official.

Date	Tournament	Location	Purse ($)	Winners	Notes
Dec 7	Skechers World Champions Cup	Florida	1,575,000	Team Europe	Team event
Dec 21	PNC Championship	Florida	1,085,000	(United States) Matt Kuchar and son Cameron Kuchar	Team event

== Charles Schwab Cup ==
The Charles Schwab Cup was based on tournament results during the season, calculated using a points-based system.

Position	Player	Points
1	(United States) Stewart Cink	3,968,040
2	(New Zealand) Steven Alker	3,846,962
3	(Spain) Miguel Ángel Jiménez	3,297,248
4	(South Africa) Ernie Els	2,624,987
5	(Denmark) Thomas Bjørn	2,473,182

== Money list ==
The money list was based on prize money won during the season, calculated in U.S. dollars.

Position	Player	Prize money ($)
1	(United States) Stewart Cink	3,247,147
2	(Spain) Miguel Ángel Jiménez	3,171,998
3	(New Zealand) Steven Alker	3,169,266
4	(South Africa) Ernie Els	2,390,940
5	(Denmark) Thomas Bjørn	2,152,582

== Awards ==
Award	Winner	Ref.
Player of the Year (Jack Nicklaus Trophy)	(United States) Stewart Cink	
Rookie of the Year (Hale Irwin Award)	(United States) Tommy Gainey	
Scoring leader (Byron Nelson Award)	(New Zealand) Steven Alker	
