= Cameron Percy =

Australian professional golfer (born 1974)

Personal information
- Full name: Cameron Blair Percy
- Nationality: Australia
- Born: 5 May 1974 (age 52) Chelsea, Victoria, Australia
- Height: 1.82 m (6 ft 0 in)

Career
- Sport: Golf
- Turned professional: 1998
- Current tour: PGA Tour Champions
- Former tours: PGA Tour; Korn Ferry Tour; PGA Tour of Australasia
- Professional wins: 6

Number of wins by tour
- Korn Ferry Tour: 1
- Other: 5

Best results in major championships
- Masters Tournament: DNP
- PGA Championship: DNP
- U.S. Open: DNP
- The Open Championship: CUT: 2003, 2010

Cameron Blair Percy (born 5 May 1974) is an Australian professional golfer.

== Career ==
Percy was born in Chelsea, Victoria. In 1998, he turned professional. In 2005, Percy joined the second-tier Nationwide Tour but enjoyed little success. He returned to Australia where he won twice on the developmental Von Nida Tour in 2006.

Percy was back on the Nationwide Tour in 2008 and the following year finished in 8th place on the money list, having had eight top 10 finishes including two runner-up finishes, to graduate to the PGA Tour for 2010.

Percy has since bounced back-and-forth between the PGA Tour and the Korn Terry Tour. He finished 168th on the FedEx Cup points list in 2010, 161st in 2011, and 158th in 2013. In 2014, he prevailed in a five-way playoff to win the Price Cutter Charity Championship on the Web.com Tour. He finished 15th on the final 2014 Web.com Tour money list to secure his PGA Tour card for the 2014–15 season.

Over the next six seasons (2014–15 through 2020–21 seasons), he finished outside of the top 125 on the FedEx Cup points list every year, and thus was not able to retain his card. However, he finished inside the top 150 in four of those six seasons, and thus maintained conditional status on the PGA Tour during most of that time.

== Professional wins (6) ==
=== Web.com Tour wins (1) ===
No.	Date	Tournament	Winning score	Margin of victory	Runners-up
1	10 Aug 2014	Price Cutter Charity Championship	−21 (64-68-68-67=267)	1 stroke	(United States) Zac Blair, (United States) Brandt Jobe, (United States) Michael Kim, (United States) Carlos Sainz Jr.

Web.com Tour playoff record (0–1)

No.	Year	Tournament	Opponent	Result
1	2012	BMW Charity Pro-Am	(Australia) Nick Flanagan	Lost to par on third extra hole

=== Von Nida Tour wins (3) ===
No.	Date	Tournament	Winning score	Margin of victory	Runner(s)-up
1	5 Mar 2005	National Australia Bank Victorian PGA Championship	−15 (70-68-66-69=273)	1 stroke	(Australia) Steven Bowditch
2	22 Oct 2006	Minniecon & Burke Queensland Masters	−16 (66-69-70-67=272)	Playoff	(Australia) Marc Leishman
3	5 Nov 2006	Greater Building Society QLD PGA Championship	−20 (70-65-64-65=264)	2 strokes	(Australia) Michael Brennan, (Australia) Aaron Townsend

=== Other wins (2) ===
- 1996 Tasmanian Open
- 1997 Tasmanian Open

== Playoff record ==
PGA Tour playoff record (0–1)

No.	Year	Tournament	Opponents	Result
1	2010	Justin Timberlake Shriners Hospitals for Children Open	(United States) Jonathan Byrd, (Scotland) Martin Laird	Byrd won with eagle on fourth extra hole

PGA Tour Champions playoff record (0–2)

No.	Year	Tournament	Opponent(s)	Result
1	2025	Principal Charity Classic	(Spain) Miguel Ángel Jiménez, (Denmark) Søren Kjeldsen	Jiménez won with birdie on first extra hole
2	2025	Stifel Charity Classic	(Denmark) Thomas Bjørn	Lost to birdie on first extra hole

== Results in major championships ==
Tournament	2003	2004	2005	2006	2007	2008	2009	2010
The Open Championship	CUT							CUT

Did not play

CUT = missed the half-way cut
Note: Percy only played in The Open Championship.

== Results in The Players Championship ==
Tournament	2021
The Players Championship	T29

"T" indicates a tie for a place

== Team appearances ==
Amateur

- Nomura Cup (representing Australia): 1997
- Australian Men's Interstate Teams Matches (representing Victoria): 1996, 1997

== See also ==
- 2009 Nationwide Tour graduates
- 2012 Web.com Tour graduates
- 2014 Web.com Tour Finals graduates
- 2016 Web.com Tour Finals graduates
- 2019 Korn Ferry Tour Finals graduates
