= Jerry Kelly =

American professional golfer (born 1966)

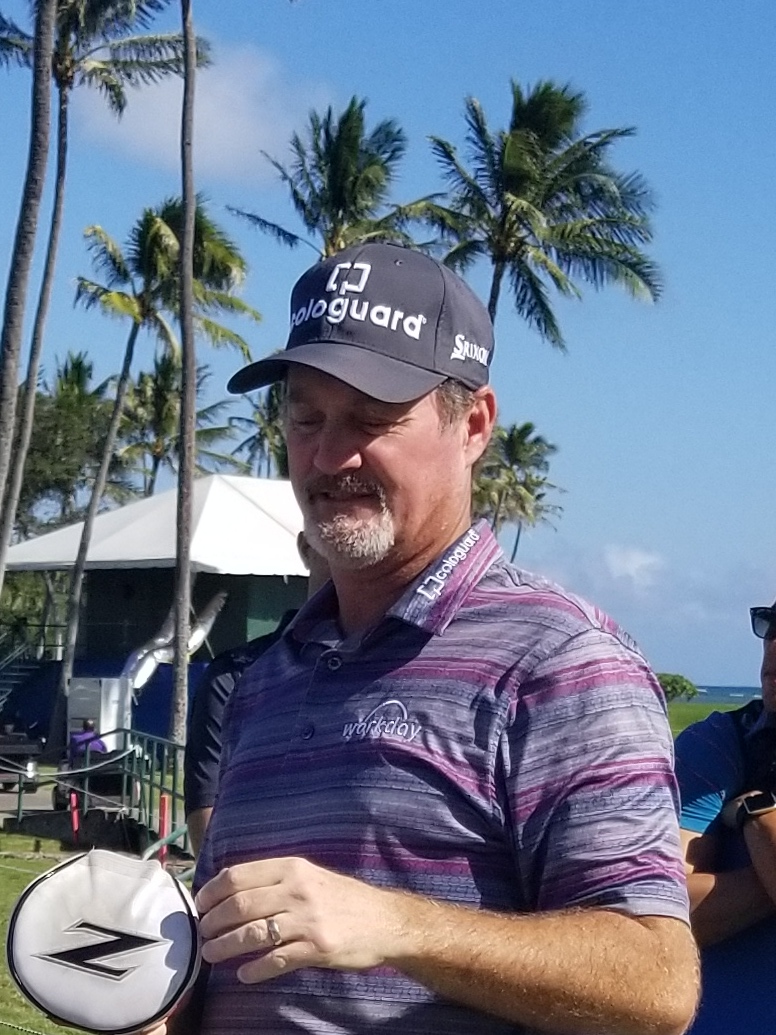
- Kelly in 2018

Personal information
- Full name: Jerome Patrick Kelly
- Nationality: United States
- Born: November 23, 1966 (age 59) Madison, Wisconsin, U.S.
- Height: 5 ft 11 in (1.80 m)
- Weight: 165 lb (75 kg; 11.8 st)
- Spouse: Carol Kelly
- Children: 1

Career
- Sport: Golf
- College: University of Hartford
- Turned professional: 1989
- Current tour: PGA Tour Champions
- Former tours: PGA Tour; Nike Tour; T. C. Jordan Tour
- Professional wins: 23
- Highest ranking: 18 (March 2, 2003)

Number of wins by tour
- PGA Tour: 3
- Korn Ferry Tour: 2
- PGA Tour Champions: 14
- European Senior Tour: 1
- Other: 4

Best results in major championships
- Masters Tournament: T5: 2007
- PGA Championship: T26: 1999, 2011
- U.S. Open: T7: 2007
- The Open Championship: T26: 2006

Achievements and awards
- Nike Tour money list winner: 1995
- Nike Tour Player of the Year: 1995
- PGA Tour Champions Rookie of the Year: 2017

Jerome Patrick Kelly (born November 23, 1966) is an American professional golfer who plays on the PGA Tour and PGA Tour Champions.

== Early life and amateur career ==
Kelly was born and raised in Madison, Wisconsin. Kelly was an all-city ice hockey selection in high school while playing for Madison East. However, he said his hockey background may have hurt his golf early in his career because of the aggressiveness it encourages him to bring to his game.

Kelly graduated from the University of Hartford in 1989.

== Professional career ==
In 1989, Kelly turned professional later that year. However, he didn't make it onto the PGA Tour until 1996. This followed a successful 1995 season on the Nike Tour when he won two tournaments. His best career year to date is 2002 when he finished fourth on the PGA Tour money list and won the Sony Open in Hawaii and Advil Western Open.

Kelly won the 2009 Zurich Classic of New Orleans with a two-foot par putt on the final hole, beating three players by one stroke (Charlie Wi, Rory Sabbatini, and Charles Howell III). It had been seven years since his previous win.

For the first time in his PGA Tour career, Kelly finished outside the valued top 125 on the tour's money list, ending the 2012 season just $1,809 out of a full Tour card. He also finished 2012 as the 25th highest earning PGA Tour golfer in history. Instead of going to Q school (where his finish would have placed him directly into the final stage), Kelly played the 2013 season using a career money list exemption, nineteen places higher on the PGA Tour priority ranking list than the 126-150 category (Priority Ranking 29). During his PGA Tour career, Kelly made 616 starts and earned almost 29 million dollars.

=== Senior career ===
Kelly made his PGA Tour Champions debut at the Chubb Classic in February 2017 and gained his first win six months later at the Boeing Classic outside Seattle. The following year, Kelly won the Mitsubishi Electric Championship at Hualalai.

In 2019, Kelly won several tournaments. In June 2019, Kelly won the American Family Insurance Championship. In September 2019, he won The Ally Challenge for his fifth PGA Tour Champions title. In October 2019, he won the SAS Championship with a final round 65.

In August 2020, Kelly won his first career major championship, and first senior major championship, the Bridgestone Senior Players Championship at Firestone Country Club in Ohio, the only senior golf major of the year. With the win, Kelly earned $450,000 and qualified for the 2021 Players Championship.

In June 2021, Kelly defended his hometown title at the American Family Insurance Championship in Madison, Wisconsin (last held in 2019). This was Kelly's eighth victory on the PGA Tour Champions.

In July 2022, Kelly won the Senior Players Championship for the second time. Kelly shot a final round of 2-under 68 and won by two strokes over defending champion Steve Stricker. The win was Kelly's second senior major championship

In July 2026, Kelly was victorious at the Senior British Open. He won the event by two strokes to claim his third career senior major title.

== Professional wins (23) ==
=== PGA Tour wins (3) ===
No.	Date	Tournament	Winning score	To par	Margin of victory	Runner(s)-up
1	Jan 14, 2002	Sony Open in Hawaii	66-65-65-70=266	−14	1 stroke	(United States) John Cook
2	Jul 7, 2002	Advil Western Open	67-69-68-65=269	−19	2 strokes	(United States) Davis Love III
3	Apr 26, 2009	Zurich Classic of New Orleans	68-66-69-71=274	−14	1 stroke	(United States) Charles Howell III, (South Africa) Rory Sabbatini, (South Korea) Charlie Wi

PGA Tour playoff record (0–1)

No.	Year	Tournament	Opponent	Result
1	1996	Greater Milwaukee Open	(United States) Loren Roberts	Lost to birdie on first extra hole

=== Nike Tour wins (2) ===
No.	Date	Tournament	Winning score	To par	Margin of victory	Runner-up
1	Apr 30, 1995	Nike Alabama Classic	65-70-70-68=273	−15	Playoff	(United States) Buddy Gardner
2	Jul 16, 1995	Nike Buffalo Open	70-72-67-65=274	−14	1 stroke	(United States) Tim Simpson

Nike Tour playoff record (1–0)

No.	Year	Tournament	Opponent	Result
1	1995	Nike Alabama Classic	(United States) Buddy Gardner	Won with par on first extra hole

=== T. C. Jordan Tour wins (1) ===
No.	Date	Tournament	Winning score	To par	Margin of victory	Runner-up
1	Apr 19, 1992	Super D Big Creek Classic	62-68-73=203	−13	1 stroke	(United States) Franklin Langham

=== Other wins (3) ===
- 1992 Wisconsin State Open
- 2006 Merrill Lynch Shootout (with Rod Pampling)
- 2009 The Shark Shootout (with Steve Stricker)

=== PGA Tour Champions wins (14) ===
Legend
PGA Tour Champions major championships (3)
Other PGA Tour Champions (11)

No.	Date	Tournament	Winning score	To par	Margin of victory	Runner(s)-up
1	Aug 27, 2017	Boeing Classic	65-66-66=197	−19	1 stroke	(United States) Jerry Smith
2	Sep 17, 2017	Pacific Links Bear Mountain Championship	65-66-68=199	−14	1 stroke	(United States) Lee Janzen
3	Jan 20, 2018	Mitsubishi Electric Championship at Hualalai	64-68-66=198	−18	1 stroke	(Scotland) Colin Montgomerie
4	Jun 23, 2019	American Family Insurance Championship	65-70-66=201	−15	Playoff	(South Africa) Retief Goosen, (United States) Steve Stricker
5	Sep 15, 2019	The Ally Challenge	67-65-68=200	−16	2 strokes	(United States) Woody Austin
6	Oct 13, 2019	SAS Championship	68-67-65=200	−16	1 stroke	(Australia) David McKenzie
7	Aug 15, 2020	Bridgestone Senior Players Championship	68-70-70-69=277	−3	2 strokes	(United States) Scott Parel
8	Jun 13, 2021	American Family Insurance Championship (2)	67-69-66=202	−14	1 stroke	(United States) Fred Couples, (Spain) Miguel Ángel Jiménez
9	Jun 5, 2022	Principal Charity Classic	65-66-67=198	−18	Playoff	(United States) Kirk Triplett
10	Jul 10, 2022	Bridgestone Senior Players Championship (2)	67-69-65-68=269	−11	2 strokes	(United States) Steve Stricker
11	Aug 7, 2022	Shaw Charity Classic	68-66-67=201	−9	Playoff	(United States) John Huston
12	Oct 13, 2024	SAS Championship (2)	67-69-67=203	−13	1 stroke	(Republic of Ireland) Pádraig Harrington
13	Apr 27, 2025	Mitsubishi Electric Classic	62-67-67=196	−20	1 stroke	(South Africa) Ernie Els
14	Jul 26, 2026	ISPS Handa Senior Open	66-68-68-68=270	−10	2 strokes	(South Africa) Darren Fichardt, (United States) Matt Gogel, (Australia) Cameron Percy

PGA Tour Champions playoff record (3–1)

No.	Year	Tournament	Opponent(s)	Result
1	2019	American Family Insurance Championship	(South Africa) Retief Goosen, (United States) Steve Stricker	Won with birdie on third extra hole
2	2020	PURE Insurance Championship	(United States) Jim Furyk	Lost to birdie on first extra hole
3	2022	Principal Charity Classic	(United States) Kirk Triplett	Won with birdie on first extra hole
4	2022	Shaw Charity Classic	(United States) John Huston	Won with birdie on first extra hole

== Results in major championships ==
Tournament	1997	1998	1999
Masters Tournament			
U.S. Open			T57
The Open Championship	T44		
PGA Championship	CUT	WD	T26

Tournament	2000	2001	2002	2003	2004	2005	2006	2007	2008	2009
Masters Tournament			T20	48	T31	T20		T5	CUT	
U.S. Open	T37		CUT	CUT	T40	83		T7	CUT	
The Open Championship		CUT	T28	WD	T47	CUT	T26	T49	CUT	
PGA Championship	CUT	T44	CUT	CUT	CUT	T34	48	CUT	CUT	CUT

Tournament	2010	2011	2012	2013	2014
Masters Tournament	T12	CUT			
U.S. Open	T63			T41	
The Open Championship	CUT	CUT			
PGA Championship	CUT	T26			T27

Top 10
Did not play

WD = withdrew
CUT = missed the half-way cut
"T" = tied

=== Summary ===
Tournament	Wins	2nd	3rd	Top-5	Top-10	Top-25	Events	Cuts made
Masters Tournament	0	0	0	1	1	4	8	6
U.S. Open	0	0	0	0	1	1	10	7
The Open Championship	0	0	0	0	0	0	11	5
PGA Championship	0	0	0	0	0	0	16	6
Totals	0	0	0	1	2	5	45	24

- Most consecutive cuts made – 6 (2005 PGA – 2007 Open Championship)
- Longest streak of top-10s – 2 (2007 Masters – 2007 U.S. Open)

== Results in The Players Championship ==
Tournament	1996	1997	1998	1999
The Players Championship	CUT	CUT	T31	CUT

Tournament	2000	2001	2002	2003	2004	2005	2006	2007	2008	2009
The Players Championship	T42	4	T11	CUT	T6	CUT	CUT	T28	T32	CUT

Tournament	2010	2011	2012	2013	2014	2015	2016	2017	2018	2019
The Players Championship	T39	T64	CUT	T37	CUT	T17	T19	CUT		

Tournament	2020	2021	2022	2023
The Players Championship	C	CUT		T54

Top 10
Did not play

CUT = missed the halfway cut
"T" indicates a tie for a place
C = Canceled after the first round due to the COVID-19 pandemic

== Results in World Golf Championships ==
Tournament	2002	2003	2004	2005	2006	2007	2008	2009	2010
Match Play	R64	QF	QF	R32			R64		
Championship	T4	T21	T16						T50
Invitational	77	T53	T19			T46		T11	
Champions								T54	

Top 10
Did not play

QF, R16, R32, R64 = Round in which player lost in match play
"T" = tied
Note that the HSBC Champions did not become a WGC event until 2009.

== Senior major championships ==
=== Wins (3) ===
Year	Championship	54 holes	Winning score	Margin	Runner-up
2020	Bridgestone Senior Players Championship	1 shot lead	−3 (68-70-70-69=277)	2 strokes	(United States) Scott Parel
2022	Bridgestone Senior Players Championship (2)	Tied for lead	−11 (67-69-65-68=269)	2 strokes	(United States) Steve Stricker
2026	ISPS Handa Senior Open	Tied for lead	−10 (66-68-68-68=270)	2 strokes	(South Africa) Darren Fichardt, (United States) Matt Gogel, (Australia) Cameron Percy

=== Results timeline ===
Results not in chronological order

Tournament	2017	2018	2019	2020	2021	2022	2023	2024	2025	2026
Senior PGA Championship	T8	T3	5	NT	T8	T29	T59	13	CUT	
The Tradition		T8	T12	NT	T4	T13	4	T18	2	T54
U.S. Senior Open	T12	T2	T2	NT	T8	T7	3	T16	T36	T17
Senior Players Championship	T50	T4	T24	1	2	1	12	3	T21	T14
Senior British Open Championship	T45	T14	T29	NT	6	T20	T7	CUT	T17	1

Win
Top 10
Did not play

CUT = missed the halfway cut
"T" indicates a tie for a place
NT = no tournament due to COVID-19 pandemic

== U.S. national team appearances ==
Professional

- Presidents Cup: 2003 (tie)

== See also ==
- 1995 Nike Tour graduates
- List of golfers with most PGA Tour Champions wins
