= Stewart Cink =

American professional golfer (born 1973)

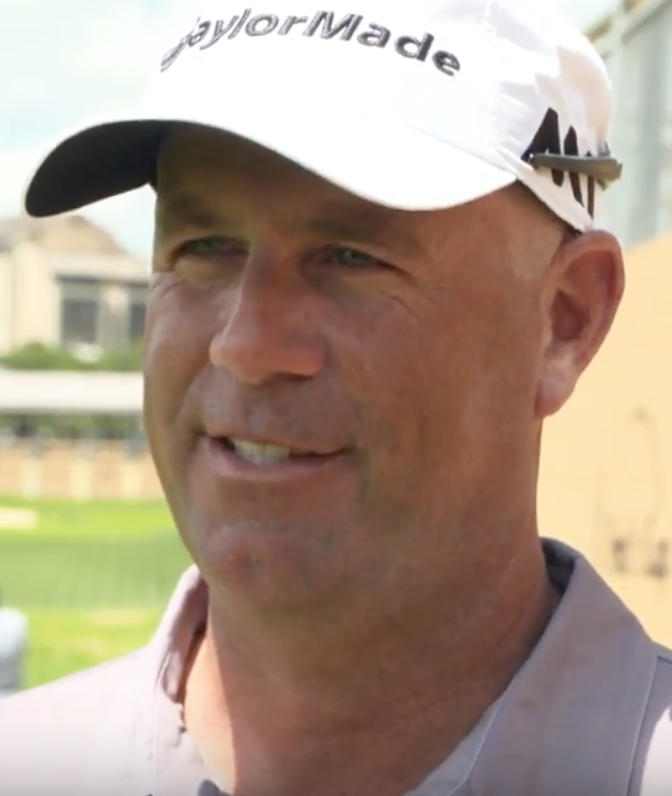
- Cink at the 2017 Valero Texas Open

Personal information
- Full name: Stewart Ernest Cink
- Nationality: United States
- Born: May 21, 1973 (age 53) Huntsville, Alabama, U.S.
- Height: 6 ft 4 in (1.93 m)
- Weight: 205 lb (93 kg; 14.6 st)
- Spouse: Lisa Cink
- Children: 2

Career
- Sport: Golf
- College: Georgia Tech
- Turned professional: 1995
- Current tour: PGA Tour Champions
- Former tours: PGA Tour; European Tour; Nike Tour; Hooters Tour
- Professional wins: 26
- Highest ranking: 5 (July 6, 2008)

Number of wins by tour
- PGA Tour: 8
- European Tour: 2
- Korn Ferry Tour: 3
- PGA Tour Champions: 10
- Other: 5

Best results in major championships (wins: 1)
- Masters Tournament: T3: 2008
- PGA Championship: T3: 1999
- U.S. Open: 3rd: 2001
- The Open Championship: Won: 2009

Achievements and awards
- Haskins Award: 1995
- Nike Tour money list winner: 1996
- Nike Tour Player of the Year: 1996
- PGA Tour Rookie of the Year: 1997
- Payne Stewart Award: 2017
- PGA Tour Champions Charles Schwab Cup winner: 2025, 2026
- PGA Tour Champions money list winner: 2025, 2026
- PGA Tour Champions Player of the Year: 2025

Stewart Ernest Cink (born May 21, 1973) is an American professional golfer who plays on the PGA Tour Champions. He won the 2009 Open Championship, defeating Tom Watson in a four-hole aggregate playoff. He spent over 40 weeks in the top 10 of the Official World Golf Ranking from 2004 to 2009, reaching a career best ranking of 5th in 2008.

== Early years and education ==
Cink was born in Huntsville, Alabama, and grew up in nearby Florence, where he attended Bradshaw High School. After completing high school in 1991, he graduated from Georgia Tech in Atlanta in 1995 with a degree in Management, where he played golf for the Yellow Jackets; he turned professional in 1995.

== Professional career ==
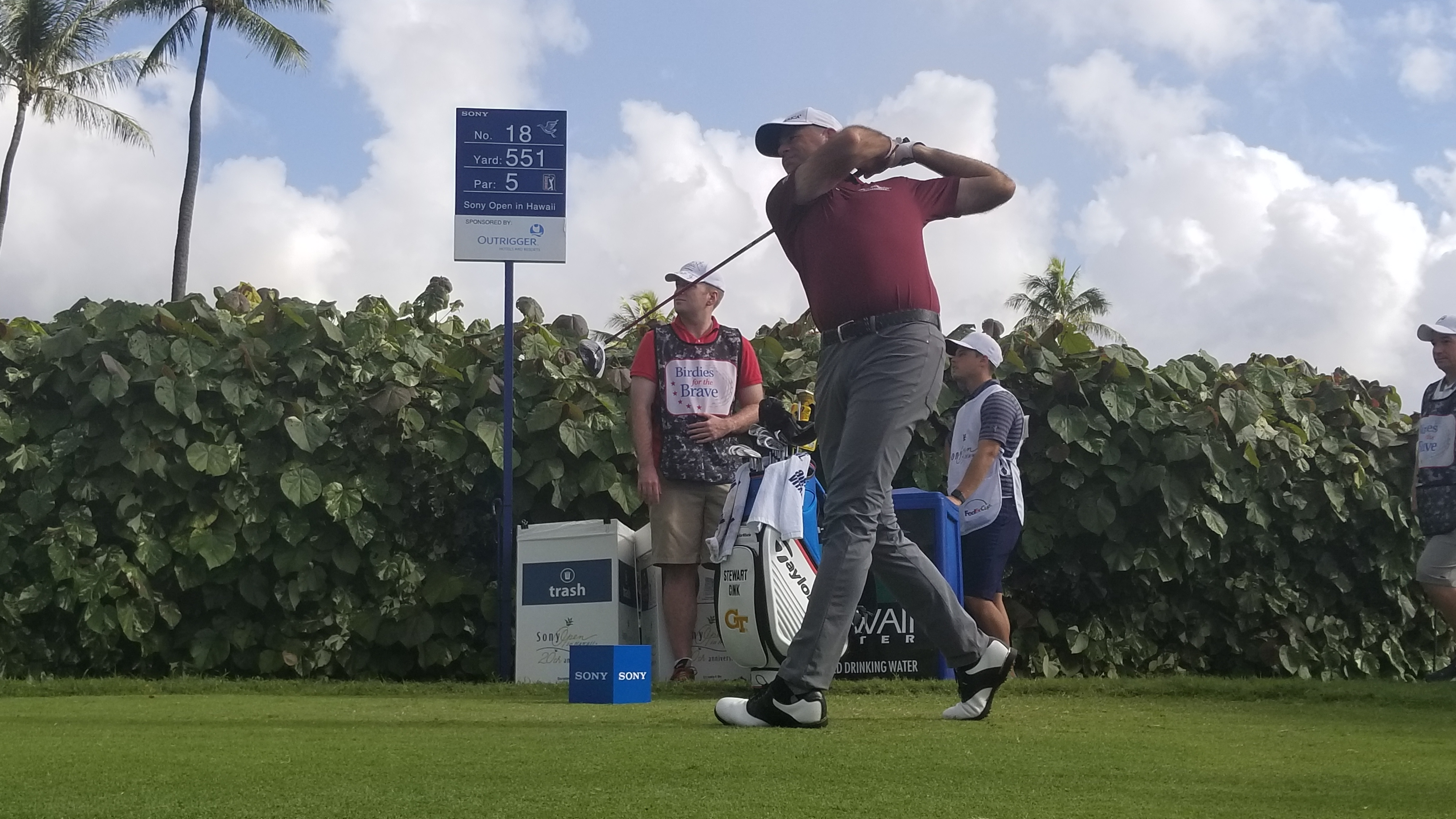
Cink at the 2018 Sony Championship Hawaii

After winning the Mexican Open and three events on the Nike Tour (now the Korn Ferry Tour) in 1996, Cink joined the PGA Tour in 1997 and won the Canon Greater Hartford Open in his rookie season. Cink performed consistently on the Tour over the next few years, picking up another win at the 2000 MCI Classic. Cink contended in the 2001 U.S. Open, missing the playoff by a single stroke after making a double-bogey on the 72nd hole. In 2004, Cink finished in fifth-place on the money list and had wins at the MCI Heritage and at the WGC-NEC Invitational, which is one of the World Golf Championships events.

On February 24, 2008, Cink was the runner-up in the WGC-Accenture Match Play Championship played in Marana, Arizona, falling 8 & 7 in the 36-hole final to top-ranked Tiger Woods. In June 2008, he reached his highest ever ranking, sixth, in the Official World Golf Rankings with his victory at the Travelers Championship in suburban Hartford.

On July 19, 2009, Cink won his first major title at the 138th Open Championship at Turnberry, Scotland, defeating 59-year-old, five-time champion Tom Watson by six strokes in a four-hole playoff. Cink had birdied the 72nd hole while Watson bogeyed, which forced the playoff.

On September 13, 2020, Cink won the Safeway Open for his first win since the 2009 Open Championship.

On April 18, 2021, Cink won the RBC Heritage for the third time. He became the fourth player to win twice in the same PGA Tour season after turning 47, the others being Sam Snead, Julius Boros and Kenny Perry (who did it two times). Cink broke the lowest 36-hole score and 54-hole score record for the tournament.

== Personal life ==
Cink and his wife, Lisa, have two sons. Cink is a Christian.

== Professional wins (26) ==
=== PGA Tour wins (8) ===
Legend
Major championships (1)
World Golf Championships (1)
Other PGA Tour (6)

No.	Date	Tournament	Winning score	Margin of victory	Runner(s)-up
1	Jul 27, 1997	Canon Greater Hartford Open	−13 (69-67-65-66=267)	1 stroke	(United States) Tom Byrum, (United States) Brandel Chamblee, (United States) Jeff Maggert
2	Apr 16, 2000	MCI Classic	−14 (71-68-66-65=270)	2 strokes	(United States) Tom Lehman
3	Apr 18, 2004	MCI Heritage (2)	−10 (72-69-69-64=274)	Playoff	(United States) Ted Purdy
4	Aug 22, 2004	WGC-NEC Invitational	−11 (63-68-68-70=269)	4 strokes	(South Africa) Rory Sabbatini, (United States) Tiger Woods
5	Jun 22, 2008	Travelers Championship (2)	−18 (66-64-65-67=262)	1 stroke	(United States) Tommy Armour III, (United States) Hunter Mahan
6	Jul 19, 2009	The Open Championship	−2 (66-72-71-69=278)	Playoff	(United States) Tom Watson
7	Sep 13, 2020	Safeway Open	−21 (67-70-65-65=267)	2 strokes	(United States) Harry Higgs
8	Apr 18, 2021	RBC Heritage (3)	−19 (63-63-69-70=265)	4 strokes	(Argentina) Emiliano Grillo, (United States) Harold Varner III

PGA Tour playoff record (2–2)

No.	Year	Tournament	Opponent(s)	Result
1	1998	Canon Greater Hartford Open	(United States) Olin Browne, (United States) Larry Mize	Browne won with birdie on first extra hole
2	2004	MCI Heritage	(United States) Ted Purdy	Won with birdie on fifth extra hole
3	2006	WGC-Bridgestone Invitational	(United States) Tiger Woods	Lost to birdie on fourth extra hole
4	2009	The Open Championship	(United States) Tom Watson	Won four-hole aggregate playoff; Cink: −2 (4-3-4-3=14), Watson: +4 (5-3-7-5=20)

=== Nike Tour wins (3) ===
Legend
Tour Championships (1)
Other Nike Tour (2)

No.	Date	Tournament	Winning score	Margin of victory	Runner(s)-up
1	Jun 23, 1996	Nike Ozarks Open	−16 (68-67-69-68=272)	Playoff	(United States) R. W. Eaks
2	Sep 8, 1996	Nike Colorado Classic	−16 (67-68-67-66=268)	1 stroke	(United States) David Berganio Jr., (United States) Michael Christie
3	Oct 20, 1996	Nike Tour Championship	−7 (66-71-71-73=281)	4 strokes	(United States) David Berganio Jr.

Nike Tour playoff record (1–1)

No.	Year	Tournament	Opponent(s)	Result
1	1996	Nike San Jose Open	(United States) Bobby Elliott, (United States) Larry Silveira	Silveira won with birdie on first extra hole
2	1996	Nike Ozarks Open	(United States) R. W. Eaks	Won with birdie on third extra hole

=== Hooters Tour wins (1) ===
No.	Date	Tournament	Winning score	Margin of victory	Runners-up
1	Oct 29, 1995	Naturally Fresh Cup	−13 (69-68-68-70=275)	6 strokes	(South Africa) Deane Pappas, (United States) Mike Swartz

=== Latin American wins (2) ===
- 1996 Mexican Open
- 1999 Mexican Open

=== Other wins (2) ===
No.	Date	Tournament	Winning score	Margin of victory	Runners-up
1	Jun 19, 2007	CVS Caremark Charity Classic (with (United States) J. J. Henry)	−20 (60-62=122)	1 stroke	(United States) Brad Faxon and (United States) Zach Johnson
2	Dec 15, 2013	PNC Father-Son Challenge (with son Connor Cink)	−22 (61-61=122)	3 strokes	(Australia) Steve Elkington and son Sam Elkington, (Fiji) Vijay Singh and son Qass Singh

Other playoff record (0–1)

No.	Year	Tournament	Opponents	Result
1	2002	CVS Charity Classic (with (United States) David Toms)	(United States) Chris DiMarco and (United States) Dudley Hart	Lost to birdie on third extra hole

=== PGA Tour Champions wins (10) ===
Legend
PGA Tour Champions major championships (2)
Charles Schwab Cup playoff events (2)
Other PGA Tour Champions (6)

No.	Date	Tournament	Winning score	Margin of victory	Runner(s)-up
1	Aug 25, 2024	The Ally Challenge	−17 (67-66-66=199)	4 strokes	(South Korea) K. J. Choi
2	May 4, 2025	Insperity Invitational	−11 (71-66-68=205)	Playoff	(South Africa) Retief Goosen
3	Aug 24, 2025	The Ally Challenge (2)	−15 (62-71-68=201)	Playoff	(South Africa) Ernie Els
4	Nov 16, 2025	Charles Schwab Cup Championship	−20 (64-68-65-67=264)	2 strokes	(New Zealand) Steven Alker
5	Jan 24, 2026	Mitsubishi Electric Championship at Hualalai	−23 (66-63-64=193)	3 strokes	(Argentina) Ángel Cabrera
6	Mar 29, 2026	Hoag Classic	−19 (66-62-66=194)	4 strokes	(South Africa) Ernie Els, (United States) Zach Johnson
7	Apr 19, 2026	Senior PGA Championship	−19 (69-67-70-63=269)	6 strokes	(United States) Ben Crane
8	May 3, 2026	Regions Tradition	−18 (65-65-71-69=270)	3 strokes	(Australia) Scott Hend
9	Aug 16, 2026	Boeing Classic	−12 (68-71-65=204)	Playoff	(Spain) Miguel Ángel Jiménez
10	Nov 15, 2026	Charles Schwab Cup Championship (2)	−19 (63-65-68-69=265)	2 strokes	(United States) Zach Johnson

PGA Tour Champions playoff record (3–0)

No.	Year	Tournament	Opponent	Result
1	2025	Insperity Invitational	(South Africa) Retief Goosen	Won with birdie on first extra hole
2	2025	The Ally Challenge	(South Africa) Ernie Els	Won with par on first extra hole
3	2026	Boeing Classic	(Spain) Miguel Ángel Jiménez	Won with birdie on first extra hole

== Major championships ==
=== Wins (1) ===
Year	Championship	54 holes	Winning score	Margin	Runner-up
2009	The Open Championship	3 shot deficit	−2 (66-72-71-69=278)	Playoff^{1}	(United States) Tom Watson

^{1}Defeated Watson in a four-hole aggregate playoff; Cink (4-3-4-3=14), Watson (5-3-7-5=20).

=== Results timeline ===
Results not in chronological order in 2020.

Tournament	1996	1997	1998	1999
Masters Tournament		CUT	T23	T27
U.S. Open	T16	T13	T10	T32
The Open Championship			T66	CUT
PGA Championship		CUT	CUT	T3

Tournament	2000	2001	2002	2003	2004	2005	2006	2007	2008	2009
Masters Tournament	T28	CUT	T24		T17	T20	10	T17	T3	CUT
U.S. Open	T8	3	CUT	T28	CUT	T15	T37	CUT	T14	T27
The Open Championship	T41	T30	T59	T34	T14	CUT	CUT	T6	CUT	1
PGA Championship	T15	T59	T10	CUT	T17	T28	T24	T32	CUT	T67

Tournament	2010	2011	2012	2013	2014	2015	2016	2017	2018
Masters Tournament	CUT	CUT	T50	T25	T14				
U.S. Open	T40	CUT	CUT	CUT	T54			T46	
The Open Championship	T48	T30	CUT	T26	T47	T20		CUT	T24
PGA Championship	T18	CUT	CUT	CUT	CUT				T4

Tournament	2019	2020	2021	2022	2023	2024	2025	2026
Masters Tournament	CUT		T12	CUT				
PGA Championship			T30	T23				CUT
U.S. Open			T57	CUT	CUT			
The Open Championship	T20	NT	CUT	CUT	T23	CUT	CUT	CUT

Win
Top 10
Did not play

CUT = missed the half-way cut
"T" = tied
NT = no tournament due to COVID-19 pandemic

=== Summary ===
Tournament	Wins	2nd	3rd	Top-5	Top-10	Top-25	Events	Cuts made
Masters Tournament	0	0	1	1	2	10	20	13
PGA Championship	0	0	1	2	3	7	22	13
U.S. Open	0	0	1	1	3	7	23	15
The Open Championship	1	0	0	1	2	7	27	16
Totals	1	0	3	5	10	31	92	57

- Most consecutive cuts made – 7 (1999 Masters – 2000 PGA)
- Longest streak of top-10s – 1 (ten times)

== Results in The Players Championship ==
Tournament	1998	1999	2000	2001	2002	2003	2004	2005	2006	2007	2008	2009
The Players Championship	T42	CUT	T33	CUT	CUT	T39	T22	T32	CUT	T3	T21	T76

Tournament	2010	2011	2012	2013	2014	2015	2016	2017	2018	2019
The Players Championship	CUT	T19	T64	CUT	T38	CUT			CUT	CUT

Tournament	2020	2021	2022	2023
The Players Championship	C	CUT	CUT	CUT

Top 10
Did not play

CUT = missed the halfway cut
"T" indicates a tie for a place
C = Canceled after the first round due to the COVID-19 pandemic

== World Golf Championships ==
=== Wins (1) ===
Year	Championship	54 holes	Winning score	Margin	Runners-up
2004	WGC-NEC Invitational	5 shot lead	−11 (63-68-68-70=269)	4 strokes	(South Africa) Rory Sabbatini, (United States) Tiger Woods

=== Results timeline ===
Results not in chronological order before 2015.

Tournament	1999	2000	2001	2002	2003	2004	2005	2006	2007	2008	2009	2010	2011	2012	2013	2014	2015	2016	2017	2018	2019
Championship	T4		NT^{1}			T23	T46	T13	T45	T20	T59	T37									
Match Play	R16	R64	R64	R64		R32	QF	R64	R16	2	3	QF	R32								
Invitational		7	T13	T47	T61	1	T41	2	T56	T43	T6	T19	T45								
Champions											T51										

Tournament	2020	2021
Championship		
Match Play	NT^{2}	
Invitational		T43
Champions	NT^{2}	NT^{2}

^{1}Canceled due to 9/11
^{2}Canceled due to COVID-19 pandemic

Win
Top 10
Did not play

QF, R16, R32, R64 = Round in which player lost in match play
"T" = tied
NT = No Tournament
Note that the HSBC Champions did not become a WGC event until 2009.

== Senior major championships ==
=== Wins (2) ===
Year	Championship	54 holes	Winning score	Margin	Runner-up
2026	Senior PGA Championship	1 shot deficit	−19 (69-67-70-63=269)	6 strokes	(United States) Ben Crane
2026	Regions Tradition	3 shot lead	−18 (65-65-71-69=270)	3 strokes	(Australia) Scott Hend

=== Results timeline ===
Results not in chronological order

Tournament	2023	2024	2025	2026
Senior PGA Championship	3	T9	T5	1
The Tradition		T3	T12	1
U.S. Senior Open			2	2
Senior Players Championship	T7		3	4
Senior British Open Championship				T11

Win
Top 10
Did not play

"T" indicates a tie for a place

== U.S. national team appearances ==
Professional

- Presidents Cup: 2000 (winners), 2005 (winners), 2007 (winners), 2009 (winners)
- Ryder Cup: 2002, 2004, 2006, 2008 (winners), 2010
- WGC-World Cup: 2005, 2006
- Wendy's 3-Tour Challenge (representing PGA Tour): 2006 (winners), 2008, 2009

== See also ==
- 1996 Nike Tour graduates
- List of golfers with most PGA Tour Champions wins
