= Steven Alker =

New Zealand professional golfer (born 1971)

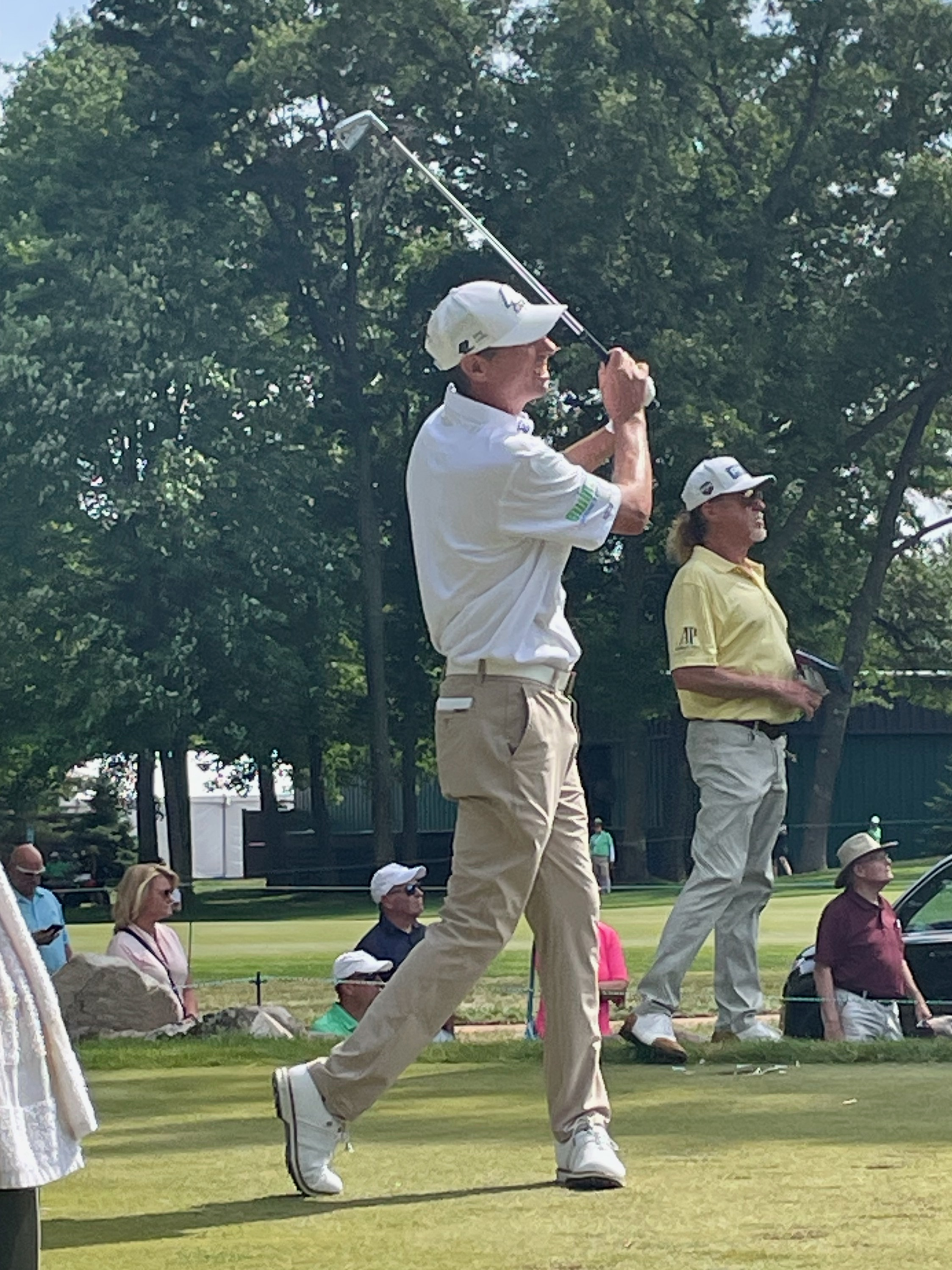
- Alker at the 2023 U.S. Senior Open

Personal information
- Full name: Steven Craig Alker
- Nationality: New Zealand
- Born: 28 July 1971 (age 55) Hamilton, New Zealand
- Height: 1.80 m (5 ft 11 in)
- Weight: 65 kg (143 lb; 10.2 st)
- Spouse: Tanya (m. 2003)
- Children: 2

Career
- Sport: Golf
- Turned professional: 1995
- Current tour: PGA Tour Champions
- Former tours: PGA Tour; European Tour; PGA Tour of Australasia; Korn Ferry Tour; Canadian Tour
- Professional wins: 27

Number of wins by tour
- PGA Tour of Australasia: 3
- Korn Ferry Tour: 4
- PGA Tour Champions: 14
- European Senior Tour: 3
- Other: 5

Best results in major championships
- Masters Tournament: DNP
- PGA Championship: CUT: 2023
- U.S. Open: T45: 2013
- The Open Championship: T19: 2012

Achievements and awards
- Canadian Tour Order of Merit winner: 2000
- PGA Tour Champions Charles Schwab Cup winner: 2022, 2024
- PGA Tour Champions money list winner: 2022, 2024
- PGA Tour Champions Player of the Year: 2022, 2024
- PGA Tour Champions Byron Nelson Award: 2022, 2024, 2025

Steven Craig Alker (born 28 July 1971) is a New Zealand professional golfer who plays on the PGA Tour Champions, where he has won 13 times. He won the season-long 2022 Charles Schwab Cup on the PGA Tour Champions.

== Early life ==
Alker was born in Hamilton, New Zealand.

== Professional career ==
In 1995, Alker turned professional. He has competed on several tours around the world. He has been a member of the PGA Tour of Australasia since 1995. He played on the European Tour in 1998 and 1999, also competing on Europe's developmental Challenge Tour in 1999. In 2000, he won the Canadian Tour Order of Merit.

Shortly thereafter, Alker moved to the United States. He competed on the Buy.com Tour, the PGA Tour's developmental tour, in 2002. He was successful enough to graduate to the full PGA Tour in 2003 but was unable to retain his card and returned to the development tour from 2004 to 2006. In 2007 and 2008, he went back to Europe to play on the European and Challenge tours. He returned to the PGA Tour's developmental tour in 2009. At the 2014 Cleveland Open on the Web.com Tour, Alker beat Dawie van der Walt on the 11th playoff hole, a tour record for longest playoff. He finished 20th in the Web.com Tour Finals to earn his PGA Tour card for the 2014–15 season. In 2016, Alker played in The Open Championship after tying for second place in the Final Qualifying event held at the Royal Cinque Ports Golf Club.

=== Senior career ===
In November 2021, Alker won the TimberTech Championship on the PGA Tour Champions in Boca Raton, Florida. With the win, Alker had earned $896,207 in nine senior tournaments after turning 50 years of age in July 2021. This amount was more than he made in his PGA Tour career. Alker continued this form into the 2022 season, recording wins at the Rapiscan Systems Classic and the Insperity Invitational. He also finished runner-up at the Mitsubishi Electric Championship at Hualalai and the ClubCorp Classic; losing in a playoff on both occasions.

In May 2022, Alker won his first senior major championship at the 2022 KitchenAid Senior PGA Championship at The Golf Club at Harbor Shores in Benton Harbor, Michigan. Alker shot a final round 63 to win the championship by three strokes. This was his third win in five starts and fourth in 19 as a senior.

In November 2022, Alker finished third at the Charles Schwab Cup Championship which secured him first place in the season-long Charles Schwab Cup and the $1,000,000 first prize. He also won the Arnold Palmer Award for the season-long money title and the Byron Nelson Award for the lowest scoring average for the 2022 season.

In November 2023, Alker won the Charles Schwab Cup Championship at Phoenix Country Club, defeating Ernie Els and Stephen Ames by a single stroke. This victory secured second place for Alker in the season-long Charles Schwab Cup and a $500,000 annuity.

In March 2025, Alker won the Cologuard Classic.

== Professional wins (27) ==
=== PGA Tour of Australasia wins (3) ===
No.	Date	Tournament	Winning score	Margin of victory	Runner(s)-up
1	20 Oct 1996	Foodlink Queensland Open	−13 (67-69-67-72=275)	1 stroke	(Australia) Greg Chalmers
2	9 Feb 1997	Ford South Australian Open	−15 (71-67-70-65=273)	1 stroke	(Australia) Wayne Grady
3	8 Mar 2009	HSBC New Zealand PGA Championship^{1}	−15 (69-70-67-67=273)	2 strokes	(New Zealand) Josh Geary, (New Zealand) David Smail

^{1}Co-sanctioned by the Nationwide Tour

PGA Tour of Australasia playoff record (0–1)

No.	Year	Tournament	Opponent	Result
1	1997	Canon Challenge	(Australia) Peter Senior	Lost to birdie on fourth extra hole

=== Web.com Tour wins (4) ===
No.	Date	Tournament	Winning score	Margin of victory	Runner(s)-up
1	14 Apr 2002	Louisiana Open	−24 (65-66-69-64=264)	Playoff	(United States) Mike Heinen
2	8 Mar 2009	HSBC New Zealand PGA Championship^{1}	−15 (69-70-67-67=273)	2 strokes	(New Zealand) Josh Geary, (New Zealand) David Smail
3	14 Jul 2013	Utah Championship	−22 (71-64-61-66=262)	Playoff	(Australia) Ashley Hall
4	8 Jun 2014	Cleveland Open	−14 (70-70-65-65=270)	Playoff	(South Africa) Dawie van der Walt

^{1}Co-sanctioned by the PGA Tour of Australasia

Web.com Tour playoff record (3–1)

No.	Year	Tournament	Opponent	Result
1	2002	Louisiana Open	(United States) Mike Heinen	Won with par on second extra hole
2	2013	Utah Championship	(Australia) Ashley Hall	Won with par on first extra hole
3	2014	Cleveland Open	(South Africa) Dawie van der Walt	Won with birdie on eleventh extra hole
4	2014	Albertsons Boise Open	(United States) Steve Wheatcroft	Lost to birdie on second extra hole

=== Australasian Development Tour wins (1) ===
No.	Date	Tournament	Winning score	Margin of victory	Runner-up
1	21 Oct 2001	Toyota Southern Classic	−12 (66-70-66-66=268)	Playoff	(Australia) Gavin Coles

=== Canadian Tour wins (2) ===
No.	Date	Tournament	Winning score	Margin of victory	Runner(s)-up
1	27 Aug 2000	McDonald's PEI Challenge	−10 (71-70-66-71=278)	3 strokes	(United States) Ken Duke, (United States) Brian Unk
2	17 Sep 2000	Bayer Championship	−22 (65-69-62-66=262)	5 strokes	(United States) Arron Oberholser

=== Other wins (2) ===
- 1995 Fiji Open
- 1996 Tahiti Open

=== PGA Tour Champions wins (14) ===
Legend
Senior major championships (1)
Charles Schwab Cup playoff events (4)
Other PGA Tour Champions (9)

No.	Date	Tournament	Winning score	Margin of victory	Runner(s)-up
1	7 Nov 2021	TimberTech Championship	−17 (68-63-68=199)	2 strokes	(United States) Jim Furyk, (Spain) Miguel Ángel Jiménez
2	3 Apr 2022	Rapiscan Systems Classic	−18 (71-62-65=198)	6 strokes	(Germany) Alex Čejka, (Republic of Ireland) Pádraig Harrington
3	1 May 2022	Insperity Invitational	−18 (67-65-66=198)	4 strokes	(United States) Brandt Jobe, (United States) Steve Stricker
4	29 May 2022	KitchenAid Senior PGA Championship	−16 (64-72-69-63=268)	3 strokes	(Canada) Stephen Ames
5	23 Oct 2022	Dominion Energy Charity Classic	−14 (69-65-68=202)	1 stroke	(South Korea) K. J. Choi
6	30 Apr 2023	Insperity Invitational (2)	−15 (66-69-66=201)	4 strokes	(United States) Steve Stricker
7	12 Nov 2023	Charles Schwab Cup Championship	−18 (67-64-65-70=266)	1 stroke	(Canada) Stephen Ames, (South Africa) Ernie Els
8	20 Jan 2024	Mitsubishi Electric Championship at Hualalai	−25 (65-63-63=191)	4 strokes	(United States) Harrison Frazar
9	9 Mar 2025	Cologuard Classic	−12 (69-66-66=201)	Playoff	(United States) Jason Caron
10	26 Oct 2025	Simmons Bank Championship	−20 (61-66-69=196)	7 strokes	(Australia) Richard Green, (United States) Tag Ridings
11	22 Mar 2026	Cologuard Classic (2)	−15 (71-62-65=198)	Playoff	(Republic of Ireland) Pádraig Harrington
12	23 Aug 2026	Rogers Charity Classic	−16 (68-61-65=194)	Playoff	(South Korea) Yang Yong-eun
13	30 Aug 2026	The Ally Challenge	−15 (68-65-68=201)	3 strokes	(South Africa) Retief Goosen
14	4 Oct 2026	Jefferson Lehigh Valley Classic	−14 (65-65-66=196)	1 stroke	(United States) Tag Ridings

PGA Tour Champions playoff record (3–3)

No.	Year	Tournament	Opponent(s)	Result
1	2022	Mitsubishi Electric Championship at Hualalai	(Spain) Miguel Ángel Jiménez	Lost to par on second extra hole
2	2022	ClubCorp Classic	(United States) Scott Parel, (United States) Gene Sauers	Parel won with par on first extra hole
3	2025	Cologuard Classic	(United States) Jason Caron	Won with birdie on first extra hole
4	2025	Kaulig Companies Championship	(Spain) Miguel Ángel Jiménez	Lost to birdie on second extra hole
5	2026	Cologuard Classic	(Republic of Ireland) Pádraig Harrington	Won with birdie on first extra hole
6	2026	Rogers Charity Classic	(South Korea) Yang Yong-eun	Won with birdie on first extra hole

=== European Senior Tour wins (3) ===
No.	Date	Tournament	Winning score	Margin of victory	Runner-up
1	29 May 2022	KitchenAid Senior PGA Championship	−16 (64-72-69-63=268)	3 strokes	(Canada) Stephen Ames
2	17 Nov 2024	WCM Legends Mexico Open	−17 (66-67-66=199)	1 stroke	(South Africa) James Kingston
3	6 Sep 2026	NI Legends	−15 (67-67-67=201)	2 strokes	(South Africa) Hennie Otto

== Results in major championships ==
Tournament	1998	1999
Masters Tournament		
U.S. Open		
The Open Championship	CUT	
PGA Championship		

Tournament	2000	2001	2002	2003	2004	2005	2006	2007	2008	2009
Masters Tournament										
U.S. Open										
The Open Championship								CUT		
PGA Championship										

Tournament	2010	2011	2012	2013	2014	2015	2016	2017	2018
Masters Tournament									
U.S. Open				T45	CUT				
The Open Championship			T19				CUT		
PGA Championship									

Tournament	2019	2020	2021	2022	2023
Masters Tournament					
PGA Championship					CUT
U.S. Open					
The Open Championship		NT			

Did not play

CUT = missed the half-way cut
"T" = tied
NT = no tournament due to the COVID-19 pandemic

== Results in senior major championships ==
Results not in chronological order

Tournament	2022	2023	2024	2025	2026
Senior PGA Championship	1	T5		T14	T5
The Tradition	T3	T28	2	4	T11
U.S. Senior Open	T11	T6	T12	7	CUT
Senior Players Championship	T3	T16	T7	2	T36
Senior British Open Championship	T3	T11	T5	7	T14

Win
Top 10
Did not play

"T" indicates a tie for a place

== Team appearances ==
Amateur

- Eisenhower Trophy (representing New Zealand): 1990, 1994
- Nomura Cup (representing New Zealand): 1991, 1993
- Sloan Morpeth Trophy (representing New Zealand): 1990, 1991, 1992 (winners)

Professional

- Dunhill Cup (representing New Zealand): 1997

== See also ==
- 2002 Buy.com Tour graduates
- 2006 European Tour Qualifying School graduates
- 2014 Web.com Tour Finals graduates
- 2016 Web.com Tour Finals graduates
- List of golfers with most Web.com Tour wins
- List of golfers with most PGA Tour Champions wins
