= Insperity Invitational =

Professional golf tournament in Texas

Coordinates: 30.145°N 95.463°W

Tournament information
- Location: The Woodlands, Texas, U.S.
- Established: 2004
- Courses: The Woodlands Country Club (Tournament Course)
- Par: 72
- Length: 7,002 yards (6,403 m)
- Tour: PGA Tour Champions
- Format: Stroke play
- Prize fund: US$3,000,000
- Month played: May

Tournament record score
- Aggregate: 191 Bernhard Langer (2007)
- To par: −25 as above

Current champion
- (United States) Boo Weekley

Final champion
- Location in the United States Location in Texas

The Insperity Invitational is a professional golf tournament held in Greater Houston, Texas, United States as part of the PGA Tour Champions. It debuted in 2004 as the Administaff Small Business Classic. The first four editions were at Augusta Pines Golf Club in Spring, then it was moved to The Woodlands Country Club in The Woodlands in 2008, the former home of the Houston Open on the PGA Tour.

Played in October for its first eight years, it changed to early May in 2012. Insperity, previously known as Administaff, has been the event's main sponsor since its debut. The purse for 2018 is $2.2 million, with a winner's share of $330,000.

== Winners ==
Year	Winner	Score	To par	Margin of victory	Runner(s)-up	Purse ($)	Ref.
Insperity Invitational
2026	(United States) Boo Weekley	201	−15	3 strokes	(South Africa) Ernie Els	3,000,000	
2025	(United States) Stewart Cink	205	−11	Playoff	(South Africa) Retief Goosen	3,000,000	
2024	(United States) Scott Dunlap	135 (Note: Shortened to 36 holes due to weather.)	−9	1 stroke	(Australia) Stuart Appleby (United States) Joe Durant	2,700,000	
2023	(New Zealand) Steven Alker (2)	201	−15	4 strokes	(United States) Steve Stricker	2,700,000	
2022	(New Zealand) Steven Alker	198	−18	4 strokes	(United States) Brandt Jobe (United States) Steve Stricker	2,300,000	
2021	(Canada) Mike Weir	134	−10	2 strokes	(United States) John Daly (United States) Tim Petrovic (United States) David Toms	2,250,000	
2020	Canceled due to the COVID-19 pandemic						
2019	(United States) Scott McCarron	199	−17	2 strokes	(United States) Scott Parel	2,200,000	
2018	(Germany) Bernhard Langer (4)	205	−11	1 stroke	(United States) Bart Bryant (United States) Paul Goydos (United States) Jeff Maggert	2,200,000	
2017	(United States) John Daly	202	−14	1 stroke	(United States) Tommy Armour III (United States) Kenny Perry	2,150,000	
2016	(Sweden) Jesper Parnevik	204	−12	4 strokes	(South Africa) David Frost (United States) Mike Goodes (United States) Jeff Maggert	2,100,000	
2015	(Wales) Ian Woosnam	205	−11	Playoff	(United States) Tom Lehman (United States) Kenny Perry	2,050,000	
2014	(Germany) Bernhard Langer (3)	205	−11	1 stroke	(United States) Fred Couples	2,000,000	
Insperity Championship
2013	(Mexico) Esteban Toledo	210	−6	Playoff	(United States) Mike Goodes (United States) Gene Sauers	1,800,000	
2012	(United States) Fred Funk	202	−14	1 stroke	(United States) Tom Lehman	1,700,000	
2011	(United States) Brad Faxon	134	−10	1 stroke	(United States) Tommy Armour III	1,700,000	
Administaff Small Business Classic
2010	(United States) Fred Couples	199	−17	7 strokes	(United States) Mark Wiebe	1,700,000	
2009	(United States) John Cook	205	−11	2 strokes	(United States) Jay Haas (United States) Bob Tway	1,700,000	
2008	(Germany) Bernhard Langer (2)	204	−12	2 strokes	(United States) Lonnie Nielsen	1,700,000	
2007	(Germany) Bernhard Langer	191	−25	8 strokes	(United States) Mark O'Meara	1,700,000	
2006	(United States) Jay Haas	199	−17	5 strokes	(United States) Bruce Lietzke	1,600,000	
2005	(Republic of Ireland) Mark McNulty	200	−16	1 stroke	(United States) Gil Morgan	1,600,000	
2004	(United States) Larry Nelson	202	−14	Playoff	(United States) Hale Irwin	1,600,000	
