= Doug Barron (golfer) =

American professional golfer (born 1969)

Personal information
- Nationality: United States
- Born: July 24, 1969 (age 57) Memphis, Tennessee, U.S.
- Height: 5 ft 9 in (175 cm)
- Weight: 170 lb (77 kg)
- Spouse: Leslie
- Children: 2

Career
- Sport: Golf
- College: Louisiana State University; Mississippi State University
- Turned professional: 1992
- Current tour: PGA Tour Champions
- Former tours: PGA Tour; Web.com Tour
- Professional wins: 10

Number of wins by tour
- PGA Tour Champions: 4
- Other: 6

Best results in major championships
- Masters Tournament: DNP
- PGA Championship: DNP
- U.S. Open: CUT: 1999
- The Open Championship: DNP

Doug Barron (born July 24, 1969) is an American professional golfer. Barron had one of the top junior careers in the history his hometown of Memphis, Tennessee, winning nearly every Memphis Golf Association tournament in his age group and was ultimately ranked among the top juniors in the country. However, Barron struggled after he turned pro, vacillating between the PGA Tour and its developmental tour, his regular career abruptly ended by a controversial drug suspension. As a senior, however, Barron has enjoyed extraordinary success, winning four tournaments on the PGA Tour Champions so far, including a senior major, the Regions Tradition.

== Early life ==
Barron was born in Memphis, Tennessee. He was raised in Germantown, Tennessee, a suburb of Memphis. Around the age of 7, he started playing golf. A few years later, he began playing competitively.

At the age of 12 and 13, Barron began to receiving media coverage for a number of victories in junior tournaments around Memphis. In June 1982, Barron played the Memphis Golf Association (MGA) Junior tournament at Chickasaw Country Club. With scores of 91 and 82, Barron won the 12-year-old division. The following month, in August, he played Chickasaw's junior championship. He won the 11-13 age bracket. Later in the summer, he won the junior championship for Windyke Country Club in the same age bracket. In July 1983, Barron finished in second place overall at the MGA Junior and was the lowest scorer in his age group.

In the middle of 1984, during the summer he turned 15, Barron had success at a number of significant events across Tennessee. In July, he played the Tennessee Junior Championship. Barron closed with rounds of 75 "to easily outdistance" the competition, winning by 14 strokes. In August, he played the Bubba Conlee Junior Classic at Farmington Country Club in his hometown of Germantown, Tennessee. Barron closed with an even-par 71 to finish one out of a playoff. His impressive play was worthy of a "special mention," according to The Commercial Appeal. The following summer, in June 1985, Barron played the two-round Tennessee PGA Junior Championship again. It was held at the par-72 Bluegrass Yacht and Country Club in Hendersonville, Tennessee. With rounds of 72 and 75, Barron won the 15-17-year-old division by a shot. In July, he won the MGA Junior Championship once more, this time in the 16-year-old division. He was also the overall winner.

During his junior year of high school, Barron became a "tournament regular around the States," playing significant events outside of Tennessee. Early in the academic year, he played the PGA Junior National at PGA National Resort in Palm Beach Gardens, Florida. Barron finished in solo seventh place, defeating a number of future pros like Christian Peña and Mike Sposa. In the middle of the academic year, in December 1985, Barron played the Orange Bowl Festival in Miami, Florida. He would be playing against golfers from 13 countries. In the third round, he shot a 69 to move into a tie for the lead with, among others, Robert Gamez. In the final round, Barron continued to play well, eagling the 11th hole to stay in contention. However, he bogeyed the final hole to lose to Sweden's Magnus Rosenback by a shot. "It was real close and I'll never forget it," Barron said after the tournament. In the summer, his good play continued. In June 1986, Barron played the "prestigious" Southern Junior in Tuscaloosa, Alabama. He held the lead after two rounds. He faltered in the final round but still finished in the top three. The following month, in July, Barron played the local version of the Insurors Youth Classic, a two-round event, in Greeneville, Tennessee. The top four would earn rights to play the national tournament. "It's pretty important to me to make the national," he said after the first round. "I really want to go up there and play with big boys." Barron indeed moved on, finishing second. At nationals, held in Springfield, Ohio, Barron continued to play well, finishing in the top five. By the end of the summer, Barron was a nationally known golfer. Among several thousand ranked junior golfers, Barron was ranked #21 in the country by the American Golf Association.

In September, Barron returned to Germantown High School for his senior year and played on the golf team once again. Barron was medalist at the first event, playing against Kirby High School, shooting a 67 at Olive Branch Country Club. During the regular season, Barron usually earned medalist honors and Germantown's team won almost all of its matches. In early October, Germantown played the Disctrict 28 Boys Championship. Germantown won and Barron, shooting a 69, earned medalist honors. The following week, they played the Region 7 Championship. Barron "helped lead" his team to victory, earning medalist honors again. They earned the rights to play the state of Tennessee's high school tournament. Germantown's team finished in 5th place while, among individuals, Barron also finished fifth, three back of champion Shaun Micheel. In the spring, Barron graduated from Germantown High School.

== Amateur career ==
In the spring of 1987, Barron committed to Louisiana State University (LSU). He earned a golf scholarship. Early in the freshman year, Barron played the prestigious LSU National Invitational. LSU finished in second place and Barron played well, earning the second-best scores for his team. He outplayed teammates David Toms and Perry Moss, both future PGA Tour pros. Barron did not play as well for the remainder of his freshman year, however. A week later the university golf team played the Southwestern intercollegiate. Barron opened with a "[n]on-scoring" round of 80. Barron produced scoring rounds for the remainder of the tournament but he still finished with the second worst performance for LSU. A month later, Louisiana State played the Hal Sutton Collegiate Invitational. They entered as "a heavy favorite." LSU, however, finished in third place while Barron failed to break 75. In the middle of the academic year, LSU played the Miami-Doral Park Invitational. Barron opened with rounds of 80 and 84 to fall well back among individuals. During his freshman year, he was also diagnosed with mitral valve prolapse, a heart condition. He was prescribed a beta blocker, Propranolol, to treat the condition.

In 1988, Barron transferred to Mississippi State University (MSU). He "redshirted" for his first year at MSU. He did not play golf at all for six months. In the summer of 1989, he returned to play golf, playing a number of local Tennessee tournaments. He played in an effort "to improve his swing for college competition this fall at Mississippi State." Barron, however, did not play well in the summer. In June, he played the four-round Birmingham National Men's Invitational. Barron opened well but finished with rounds of 77-73-78 to finish out of contention. Days later, he played the two-round Memphis Metro tournament. At Whitehaven Country Club, Barron opened with a two-under-par 68 to tie for the lead. However, during the second round, held at the Links at Fox Meadows, Barron shot over-par to finish well back of the champion. In addition, after play was concluded he was "assessed a two stroke penalty" for "unsportsmanlike-like conduct" for bashing his putter into the 14th green earlier in the round. The penalty was consequential as he moved from solo third to a tie for third. The tie was resolved by a "scorecard playoff." Barron ultimately finished fifth. "I'm not in the mood to talk," Barron told reporters after the round. In July, he played the Tennessee State Four-Ball. Despite teaming up with fellow PGA Tour pro Shaun Micheel, the pair lost in the first round. In August, Barron played the four-round Tennessee Amateur. He opened with an eleven-over-par 83. Though he played better in the middle rounds he closed with a 79 (+7) to finish well out of contention. Shortly after the tournament he told reporters, "I'm really hitting it bad right now."

In the fall of 1989, Barron started playing for Mississippi State. In October, Barron played the MacGregor's Tournament of Champions. He opened with a 72, in a tie for fifth. He finished in a tie for 13th place and was the second lowest scorer for MSU. The following week, at the Dixie Intercolliegete, Barron finished in the top ten and helped Mississippi State win the tournament. For the remainder of the season, however, Barron did not play as well. In November, he played the Southern intercollegiate. Barron shot over-par in every round, including a second round 80, and finished with the worst scores for his team. Later in the academic year, in March, he played the Imperial Lakes Classic in Lakeland, Florida. Barron played poorly, punctuated by a second round 83, and easily had the worst scores among his team. Mississippi State finished 21st among the 24 teams competing. Later in the month, he played the Louisiana Golf Classics Golf Tournament. Barron was in contention for individual honors but closed with a final round 80 to finish well back. In April, Barron played the Jerry Pate Intercolliegte Invitational. Barron shot rounds of 80–87–77, the worst scores for his team. Among the dozens of individuals competing, only three had worse scores than Barron. In May, he played the NCAA Championships. Barron closed with a final round 80 and finished in a tie for 92nd among 120 players. During this era, Barron began experiencing some isolated panic attacks.

Barron did not play much during the 1990–91 season. He played more during the 1991–92 season. However, his "less than spectacular" college career continued. In September, Barron played the Carpet Capitol Classic. At three-round event, he finished with a 241 total, near last place. In October, he played the MacGregor Tournament of Champions. Barron had the worst scores for his team and Mississippi State finished in 12th place among the 15 universities competing. Later in the month, at the Dixie intercollegiate, Barron played better, shooting under-par in the first round and finished in the top 25. In February 1992, at the Gator Invitational, Barron nearly finished within the top 25 again and had the second best scores for his team. Later in the month, he began play at the Miami National Collegiate Invitational tournament. Barron played well, finishing in the top 15. For the remainder of the season, however, Barron played much worse. In April, at the Augusta Invitational, Barron failed to break 78. In May, at the SEC Invitational, Barron finished with rounds of 80 and 82. Among 60 individuals, Barron finished in 52nd place. Shortly thereafter, Barron graduated from Mississippi State.

== Professional career ==
In 1992, Barron turned pro. In the fall, he attempted to qualify for the PGA Tour at PGA Tour Qualifying School. However, he was unsuccessful. The following season, he played his first year on the minitours. In 1993, he began playing the Tommy Armour Tour and Hooters Tour. He did not have much success, however. Barron lived a hedonistic life, drinking and smoking to excess, worsening his play. He thought about quitting pro golf at this time. However, he teamed up with swing instructor Ron Atkins who improved his game. His mental and physical discipline improved. In addition, Barron practiced 10 hours a day. In 1994, he played his second season on the Hooters Tour. Barron had much more success, recording a number of top 25 finishes. Near the end of the season, he was within the top 10 of the points list. Overall, he earned roughly $21,000 on the 1994 Hooters Tour. In the fall he played PGA Tour Qualifying School. At local qualifying, Barron played excellent, earning medalist honors. At regionals, held at Deerwood Golf Club at Kingwood, Texas, Barron again played well, finishing joint fourth. At finals for 1994 PGA Tour Qualifying School, however, Barron was unable to move on, missing the fourth round cut at the six-round tournament.

In the spring of 1995, Barron started playing on the Nike Tour. Barron did not play well for most of the season. He missed nearly half of his cuts and only earned $14,000. Frequent panic attacks were beginning to interrupt his personal life and the quality of his play. Barron returned to qualifying school. At local qualifying, like the previous year, Barron again played well, finishing joint third. Barron also played well at regions, finishing joint fourth. At the finals for 1995 PGA Tour Qualifying School, though, he did not make the fourth round cut again. However, the following year, in 1996, Barron's "golfing career [began] taking off." Early in the season, at the Nike Shreveport Open, Barron played much better, closing with a 67 to finish joint third. In the middle of the season, in July, he played well again, recording another top 5 finish, this time at the Nike Philadelphia Classic. He ultimately finished 47th on the money list. Because of he finished in the top 50 he circumvented the first stage of qualifying school. Barron was successful at the earlier stages of qualifying school. The finals for 1996 PGA Tour Qualifying School were held at Lompoc, California. Barron played excellently at finals, finishing joint third.

Over the next five seasons, from 1997 through 2001, Barron played on the PGA Tour. Barron played well during the first half of the year, making the majority of cuts, but did not have any high finishes. "My game is there, I just gotta let it come out," he told reporters. In the middle of the season, Barron began recording some high finishes. In July, at the Canon Greater Hartford Open, he recorded the first top ten of his PGA Tour career. "I'm just starting to get comfortable out here and my game's starting to get good," Barron said at Hartford. "I know all the guys now and I'm not intimidated any more." In September, he recorded a tie for sixth at the LaCantera Texas Open, his best finish of the season. He finished within the top 125 on the money list, securing membership for the following season. Over the next few seasons, from 1998 through 2000, Barron's performance on tour "would follow the same arc every season – play poorly early in the season, OK in the middle and then, with his Tour status in jeopardy, play like he had nothing to lose to keep his tour card." 2000 was his "[b]est year" during this era. He recorded his best finish to date, a tie for fourth at the Air Canada Championship. He earned $461,981 during the season, his most ever so far. It was his fourth straight year in the top 125. In 2001, however, he played poorly. Injuries disrupted his play. Early in the season, he missed a month "with a stress fracture in his foot." In May, he missed three weeks of golf due to a "rib injury." Throughout the year, meanwhile, neck injuries forced him to regularly visit a doctor in Chicago. In the middle of the season, Barron told a reporter, "My year's been terrible. There's no frigging secret about that." In July, he had a panic attack during the third round of the John Deere Classic. Barron "decided it was time to step away" from the game of golf, not playing much for several months. His doctor prescribed him beta blockers to mitigate his condition. Barron returned to play late in the season at qualifying school. Barron played well at the six-round 2001 PGA Tour Qualifying School, shooting under-par every day, but it was not enough. Barron missed graduating by a shot.

Despite being demoted to the Buy.com Tour, Barron was optimistic about the upcoming season. "I can make a good living on the Buy.com Tour, enjoy the golf and be in contention," he said early in the year. "I think it's going to be more of a positive experience." Barron indeed played excellently throughout the season. Early in the year, Barron recorded a top ten at the BMW Charity Pro-Am at The Cliffs. A month later, in May, he finished solo runner-up at the SAS Carolina Classic, an event in North Carolina. Weeks later he recorded another solo runner-up finish, two back of Arron Oberholser at the Samsung Canadian PGA Championship. He was #4 on the money list at this point. Barron credited his improved play to his good health. "My health is better," he told The Commercial Appeal. "I feel good again, like I can compete." At his next event, Lake Erie Charity Classic, Barron finished joint third, two back. In late July, he recorded another runner-up finish, this time at the Fort Smith Classic in Arkansas, one back. Late in the season, Barron explained his success to The Idaho Statesman: "If you don't finish in the top five, you don't make any money. I freewheel it on the weekend. That's just the mentality you have to have on this tour." In August, he recorded another top three finish, this time at the LaSalle Bank Open near Chicago. He remained #4 on the money list. In September, he recorded another runner-up finish behind Oberholser, this time at the Utah Classic. Overall, Barron recorded seven top ten finishes for the season. Barron ultimately finished third on the Buy.com Tour's money list, earning nearly a quarter of a million dollars, receiving his PGA Tour card.

In 2003, Barron played on the PGA Tour again. His goal was to finish at the top of the money list. "People can laugh at that goal if they want, but that's what I've got to shoot for," he told reporters Early in the season, Barron did play relatively well. At one of his earliest tournaments, the five-round Bob Hope Chrysler Classic, he shot a third round 66 (−6) to move "in the thick of things." He closed with an over-par round though still finished in the top 25. Overall, made the cut in six of his first ten tournaments, recording two top-25s. He was in the top 125 of the money list during this stretch of the season. In his last 22 tournaments, though, Barron played much worse, making the cut only half a dozen times. Barron finished 168th on the money list. Late in the year, Barron tried to renew PGA Tour membership at 2003 PGA Tour Qualifying School. At finals, Barron continued with poor play, breaking par only once and finishing near last place. He did earn conditional membership on the Nationwide Tour though, the name PGA Tour's developmental tour at the time.

In 2004, Barron played on the Nationwide Tour and like his experience two years previous he performed excellently on the PGA Tour's developmental tour. The first three events were overseas, in Panama, Australia, and New Zealand. Barron made the cut in all three, earning a top ten finish at the New Zealand PGA Championship. Shortly after the tour returned to the United States, Barron recorded a top five at the Chattanooga Classic. In June, he recorded a top ten at the Lake Erie Charity Classic, as he did two year earlier. In early July, he recorded a joint third-place finish at The Reese's Cup Classic. Later in the month, Barron played excellently at the Samsung Canadian PGA Championship. Barron held a share of the lead after each of the first two rounds. Barron was outpaced by Charles Warren, who shot 66-67 over the weekend, but still finished joint second. It was Barron's ninth top three of his career on the developmental tour. He was in the top 20 of the money list at this point. Late in the season, Barron recorded top tens at the Envirocare Utah Classic and Oregon Classic. After the season concluded, Barron played 2004 PGA Tour Qualifying School. Barron's good year continued, as he finished in 26th place, qualifying for the PGA Tour.

The mid-2000s were Barron's final seasons on the PGA Tour. In 2005, Barron played well on the PGA Tour. Barron said that a sport psychologist, Joe Parent, was improving his play. "I don't fight bad thoughts," Barron said during the year. "I just kind of breath them out." He also started receiving monthly doses of exogenous testosterone in an effort to elevate his testosterone levels which were low. Early in the season, Barron played the Chrysler Classic of Tucson. Barron opened with rounds of six-under-par 66 to place himself in top ten, three back of Mark Calcavecchia's lead. In the third round, Barron continued with excellent play, shooting a 67 to put himself one back of the lead. On Sunday, Barron failed to break par though still finished in the top five. In May, he played the EDS Byron Nelson Championship. Barron moved into contention with a third round five-under-par 65. He was in a tie for third. Barron ultimately tied for third, the best performance of his career. Barron, however, injured himself late in the season; this caused poor play and he failed to make a cut in final few months. Over the next few seasons, Barron played between the PGA Tour and the developmental tour. However, injuries disrupted his career and he did not have much success.

In 2009, Barron was suspended by the PGA Tour. On November 2, 2009, it was reported by Golf Digest that Barron was "suspended by the PGA Tour for testing positive for a performance-enhancing substance." Barron responded in a statement he "did not intend to gain an unfair competitive advantage or enhance my performance while on tour." Barron was suspended for his uses of exogenous testosterone and Propranolol. Barron filed a complaint seeking a "temporary restraining order" so he could play in the 2009 PGA Tour Qualifying School. Barron alleged "bad faith" on the part of the PGA Tour. The court noted it was "a close case" but ruled against him. According to the case text, the court noted that "that he needs these Testosterone shots to address specific medical concerns relating to a reduced sex drive, fatigue, and a compromised immune system – not to play golf." The court was more sympathetic to his use of Propranolol noting that Barron "has met his burden of showing a strong likelihood of success that the decision to impose the sanction was unfair and unreasonable." However, the court noted that "the one-year suspension sanction would have been imposed even if Barron tested positive only for exogenous Testosterone." In addition, the court noted that allowing Barron to play in q-school "could raise doubts in the minds of professional golfers and golf fans regarding the PGA Tour's ability to fairly and effectively administer and enforce its Anti-Doping Program." The judge also noted that "to permit the golfer to play in a tournament this week might unfairly knock out other players seeking to qualify for next year's events."

For the remainder of his regular career, Barron largely worked as a golf instructor. "It was a good eight years, when I was home,” Barron said. "I gave a thousand lessons.” He also played a little on the Emerald Coast Tour, winning tournaments.

=== Senior career ===
As a senior, Barron has had much success. Shortly after he turned 50, he attempted to qualify for the Senior British Open. He was successful and played well at the tournament proper, finishing fifth. The following week he won the Dick's Sporting Goods Open on the PGA Tour Champions. He won another event the following season. In 2024, Barron played the Regions Tradition at Greystone Golf and Country Club in Birmingham, Alabama. Over the first three rounds, Barron opened with a 12-under-par 204. On Sunday, he played in the final group with Ernie Els and Pádraig Harrington. Barron shot a four-under-par 68 to defeat Steven Alker by two shots. He did not make a bogey in the final round. He also defeated Els and Steve Stricker by an additional shot. "Today was just a dream come true, beating all these great players," Barron said after the events. A journalist noted that, "It is, by far, is the most significant achievement of his golf career." He earned $390,000. However, after the event, while speaking with journalists, Barron deflected praise. "I have a good life," he said. "I don't judge myself on my golf. If I did, I'd have a nervous breakdown, because my career's been like a roller coaster. I judge myself on just trying to enjoy life, and this is just an honest-to-god bonus."

== Awards and honors ==
In 2025, Barron was inducted into the Mississippi State Hall of Fame

== Amateur wins ==
- 1984 Tennessee Junior Championship (13-14-year-old division)
- 1985 Tennessee PGA Junior Championship (15-17-year-old division)
- 1992 Memphis Golf Association Fourball Championship

== Professional wins (10) ==
=== PGA Tour Champions wins (4) ===
Legend
PGA Tour Champions major championships (1)
Other PGA Tour Champions (3)

No.	Date	Tournament	Winning score	Margin of victory	Runner-up
1	Aug 18, 2019	Dick's Sporting Goods Open	−17 (65-68-66=199)	2 strokes	(United States) Fred Couples
2	Aug 15, 2021	Shaw Charity Classic	−18 (64-64-64=192)	2 strokes	(United States) Steve Flesch
3	May 12, 2024	Regions Tradition	−17 (65-72-66-68=271)	2 strokes	(New Zealand) Steven Alker
4	Sep 21, 2025	PURE Insurance Championship	−12 (71-67-66=204)	1 stroke	(Fiji) Vijay Singh

PGA Tour Champions playoff record (0–1)

No.	Year	Tournament	Opponent	Result
1	2021	Dominion Energy Charity Classic	(Germany) Bernhard Langer	Lost to birdie on first extra hole

=== Other wins (6) ===
- 1992 Coca-Cola tournament
- 1995 Hurricane Tour win, Powerbilt Tour win
- 2018 three Emerald Coast Tour wins

== Results in major championships ==
Tournament	1999
U.S. Open	CUT

Note: The U.S. Open was the only major Barron played.
CUT = missed the half-way cut

== Results in the Players Championship ==
Tournament	1998	1999	2000	2001	2002	2003	2004	2005	2006
The Players Championship	T18	T52	T66	CUT					CUT

Did not play

CUT = missed the half-way cut
"T" = tied

== Senior major championships ==
=== Wins (1) ===
Year	Championship	54 holes	Winning score	Margin	Runner-up
2024	Regions Tradition	Tied for lead	−17 (65-72-66-68=271)	2 strokes	(New Zealand) Steven Alker

=== Results timeline ===
Results not in chronological order

Tournament	2019	2020	2021	2022	2023	2024	2025	2026
Senior PGA Championship	–	NT	T30					T36
The Tradition	–	NT	T19	T19		1	T27	T5
U.S. Senior Open	–	NT	T46	17		T31	T32	
Senior Players Championship	–	T23	T32	T50			T12	T58
Senior British Open Championship	T5	NT		T3		74	CUT	CUT

Win
Top 10
Did not play

CUT = missed the halfway cut
"T" indicates a tie for a place
NT = no tournament due to COVID-19 pandemic

== See also ==
- 1996 PGA Tour Qualifying School graduates
- 2002 Buy.com Tour graduates
- 2004 PGA Tour Qualifying School graduates
