= Cologuard Classic =

PGA Tour Champions tournament

Coordinates: 32.317°N 110.916°W

Tournament information
- Location: Tucson, Arizona, U.S.
- Established: 2015
- Course: La Paloma Country Club
- Par: 71
- Length: 6,884 yards (6,295 m)
- Tour: PGA Tour Champions
- Format: Stroke play
- Prize fund: US$2,200,000
- Month played: March

Tournament record score
- Aggregate: 198 Miguel Ángel Jiménez (2022); 198 Steven Alker (2026); 198 Pádraig Harrington (2026)
- To par: −20 Tom Lehman (2017)

Current champion
- (New Zealand) Steven Alker

Final champion
- Location in the United States Location in Arizona

The Cologuard Classic is a professional golf tournament in Arizona on the PGA Tour Champions. It debuted in 2015 at the Catalina Course of Omni Tucson National. The event moved several miles east to La Paloma Country Club in 2024.

The Tucson Open was a fixture on the PGA Tour for over six decades, from 1945 through 2006, and was often held at the Catalina Course, which opened in 1961. Tucson hosted the WGC-Accenture Match Play Championship for eight years in nearby Marana, from 2007 through 2014.

== Course ==
=== Current ===
La Paloma Country Club

Hole	Yards	Par	Hole	Yards	Par
1	381	4	10	454	4
2	411	4	11	514	5
3	517	5	12	178	3
4	199	3	13	417	4
5	420	4	14	211	3
6	459	4	15	418	4
7	171	3	16	538	5
8	436	4	17	185	3
9	560	5	18	415	4
Out	3,554	36	In	3,330	35
Source:		Total		6,884	71

Ridge course is the first nine holes, then Canyon (1,2,3,4,8,9) and Hill (3,4,9)

The approximate elevation at the clubhouse is 2,720 feet (830 m) above sea level.

=== Previous ===
Omni Tucson National Resort, Catalina Course (2015–2023)

Hole	Yards	Par	Hole	Yards	Par
1	395	4	10	404	4
2	535	5	11	404	4
3	375	4	12	610	5
4	170	3	13	428	4
5	398	4	14	186	3
6	425	4	15	525	5
7	197	3	16	183	3
8	587	5	17	511	5
9	436	4	18	469	4
Out	3,518	36	In	3,720	37
Source:		Total		7,328	73

Opened 65 years ago in 1961, the Catalina Course was designed by Robert Bruce Harris, and redesigned in 1983 by Robert Van Hagge and Bruce Devlin. Holes No. 7 and 8 were relocated and redesigned by Tom Lehman in 2005.

The fairways are Tifway 419 pollen-free Bermuda grass, over-seeded with winter rye; the greens are Champion Bermuda.

The approximate average elevation is 2,320 feet (705 m) above sea level.

== Winners ==
Year	Winner	Score	To par	Margin of victory	Runner(s)-up	Purse ($)	Winner's share ($)
Cologuard Classic
2026	(New Zealand) Steven Alker (2)	198	−15	Playoff	(Republic of Ireland) Pádraig Harrington	2,200,000	330,000
2025	(New Zealand) Steven Alker	201	−12	Playoff	(United States) Jason Caron	2,200,000	330,000
2024	(United States) Joe Durant	200	−13	2 strokes	(New Zealand) Steven Alker (United States) Jerry Kelly (United States) Kevin Sutherland	2,200,000	330,000
2023	(United States) David Toms	201	−15	1 stroke	(Sweden) Robert Karlsson	2,200,000	330,000
2022	(Spain) Miguel Ángel Jiménez	198	−18	4 strokes	(United States) Woody Austin (Germany) Bernhard Langer	1,800,000	270,000
2021	(United States) Kevin Sutherland	204	−15	1 stroke	(Canada) Mike Weir	1,700,000	255,000
2020	(Germany) Bernhard Langer	201	−18	2 strokes	(United States) Woody Austin	1,700,000	255,000
2019	(United States) Mark O'Meara	202	−17	4 strokes	(Northern Ireland) Darren Clarke (United States) Scott McCarron (United States) Kirk Triplett (United States) Willie Wood	1,700,000	255,000
2018	(United States) Steve Stricker	205	−14	2 strokes	(United States) Scott Dunlap (United States) Jerry Kelly (United States) Gene Sauers	1,700,000	255,000
Tucson Conquistadores Classic
2017	(United States) Tom Lehman	199	−20	1 stroke	(United States) Steve Stricker	1,700,000	255,000
2016	(United States) Woody Austin	200	−16	1 stroke	(United States) Jim Carter	1,700,000	255,000
2015	(United States) Marco Dawson	203	−13	2 strokes	(United States) Bart Bryant	1,700,000	255,000
