= SAS Championship =

Golf tournament on the PGA Tour Champions

Coordinates: 35.795°N 78.837°W

Tournament information
- Location: Cary, North Carolina
- Established: 2001
- Course: Prestonwood Country Club
- Par: 72
- Length: 7,137 yards (6,526 m)
- Tour: PGA Tour Champions
- Format: Stroke play
- Prize fund: US$2,100,000
- Month played: October

Tournament record score
- Aggregate: 194 Bernhard Langer (2018)
- To par: −22 as above

Current champion
- (Fiji) Vijay Singh

Location map
- Location in the United States Location in North Carolina

The SAS Championship is a golf tournament on the PGA Tour Champions. It is played annually in the autumn in Cary, North Carolina at the Prestonwood Country Club. SAS Institute is the main sponsor of the tournament.

The purse for the 2026 tournament was US$2,300,000, with $345,000 going to the winner. The tournament was founded in 2001.

== Winners ==
Year	Winner	Score	To par	Margin of victory	Runner(s)-up
2026	(Fiji) Vijay Singh	207	−9	2 strokes	(South Africa) Ernie Els
2025	(Germany) Alex Čejka	207	−9	3 strokes	(South Africa) Ernie Els
2024	(United States) Jerry Kelly (2)	203	−13	1 stroke	(Republic of Ireland) Pádraig Harrington
2023	(Australia) Rod Pampling	201	−15	2 strokes	(New Zealand) Steven Alker
2022	(United States) Fred Couples	196	−20	6 strokes	(New Zealand) Steven Alker
2021	(United States) Lee Janzen	204	−12	Playoff	(Spain) Miguel Ángel Jiménez
2020	(South Africa) Ernie Els	204	−12	1 stroke	(Scotland) Colin Montgomerie
2019	(United States) Jerry Kelly	200	−16	1 stroke	(Australia) David McKenzie
2018	(Germany) Bernhard Langer (2)	194	−22	6 strokes	(United States) Scott Parel
2017	(Scotland) Colin Montgomerie	200	−16	3 strokes	(United States) Doug Garwood (Fiji) Vijay Singh
2016	(United States) Doug Garwood	200	−16	4 strokes	(Germany) Bernhard Langer
2015	(United States) Tom Lehman	204	−12	1 stroke	(United States) Joe Durant
2014	(United States) Kirk Triplett	202	−14	3 strokes	(United States) Tom Lehman
2013	(United States) Russ Cochran (2)	199	−17	1 stroke	(South Africa) David Frost
2012	(Germany) Bernhard Langer	203	−13	2 strokes	(United States) Jay Don Blake
2011	(United States) Kenny Perry	205	−11	1 stroke	(United States) John Huston (United States) Jeff Sluman
2010	(United States) Russ Cochran	202	−14	2 strokes	(United States) Tom Pernice Jr.
2009	(United States) Tom Pernice Jr.	203	−13	1 stroke	(South Africa) David Frost (Zimbabwe) Nick Price
2008	(Argentina) Eduardo Romero	201	−15	3 strokes	(United States) Tom Kite
2007	(United States) Mark Wiebe	198	−18	3 strokes	(United States) Dana Quigley
2006	(United States) Tom Jenkins	134 (Note: Shortened to 36 holes due to rain.)	−10	1 stroke	(United States) Chip Beck (United States) Loren Roberts
2005	(United States) Hale Irwin	203	−13	2 strokes	(United States) Bob Gilder (United States) Tom Jenkins
2004	(United States) Craig Stadler	199	−17	6 strokes	(United States) Tom Jenkins
2003	(United States) D. A. Weibring	203	−13	1 stroke	(United States) Tom Kite (United States) Bobby Wadkins
2002	(United States) Bruce Lietzke (2)	202	−14	4 strokes	(United States) Gil Morgan (United States) Sammy Rachels (United States) Tom Watson
2001	(United States) Bruce Lietzke	201	−15	3 strokes	(United States) Allen Doyle (United States) Gary McCord
