= Dick's Sporting Goods Open =

Coordinates: 42.091°N 76.081°W

Dick's Open
Tournament information
- Location: Endicott, New York
- Established: 2007
- Course: En-Joie Golf Club
- Par: 72
- Length: 6,974 yards (6,377 m)
- Tour: PGA Tour Champions
- Format: Stroke play
- Prize fund: US$2,200,000
- Month played: June

Tournament record score
- Aggregate: 195 Lonnie Nielsen (2009)
- To par: −21 as above

Current champion
- (United States) Dicky Pride

Location map
- Location in the United States Location in New York

The Dick's Open is a golf tournament held in Endicott, New York, United States as part of the PGA Tour Champions. It debuted in July 2007, supplanting the B.C. Open, a former PGA Tour event from 1971 through 2006. It is sponsored by Dick's Sporting Goods, founded in adjacent Binghamton.

The tournament is played at the En-Joie Golf Club in Endicott in Upstate New York. En-Joie Golf Club opened 99 years ago in 1927 under the original design of Ernie Smith. The golf course was originally built by George F. Johnson, the owner of the Endicott-Johnson Shoe Company. Johnson created the golf course as a place of recreation for his employees who worked at the local shoe factory in Endicott. In 1998 and 1999, the golf course layout was renovated by Michael Hurdzan. He changed the original relatively flat, round greens into very large, undulating greens that challenge all level of golfers. With narrow, tree-lined fairways coupled with large, elevated greens En-Joie golf course is a true test for golfers of all skill levels.

The event is operated by Broome County Community Charities. The purse in 2016 was $2 million, with a winner's share of $300,000.

== Winners ==
| Year | Winner | Score | To par | Margin of victory | Runner(s)-up | Winner's share ($) |
Dick's Open
| 2026 | (United States) Dicky Pride | 198 | −18 | Playoff | (Republic of Ireland) Pádraig Harrington | 330,000 |
| 2025 | (Australia) Stephen Allan | 198 | −18 | 4 strokes | (United States) Jason Carron | 330,000 |
| 2024 | (Republic of Ireland) Pádraig Harrington (3) | 201 | −15 | 1 stroke | (Canada) Mike Weir | 315,000 |
Dick's Sporting Goods Open
| 2023 | (Republic of Ireland) Pádraig Harrington (2) | 198 | −18 | 1 stroke | (United States) Joe Durant | 315,000 |
| 2022 | (Republic of Ireland) Pádraig Harrington | 200 | −16 | 3 strokes | (Thailand) Thongchai Jaidee (Canada) Mike Weir | 315,000 |
| 2021 | (United States) Cameron Beckman | 204 | −12 | 1 stroke | (South Africa) Ernie Els | 307,500 |
| 2020 | Canceled due to the COVID-19 pandemic | | | | | |
| 2019 | (United States) Doug Barron | 199 | −17 | 2 strokes | (United States) Fred Couples | 307,500 |
| 2018 | (United States) Bart Bryant (2) | 200 | −16 | 1 stroke | (United States) Michael Bradley | 307,500 |
| 2017 | (United States) Scott McCarron | 196 | −20 | 1 stroke | (United States) Kevin Sutherland | 300,000 |
| 2016 | (United States) Paul Goydos | 202 | −14 | 2 strokes | (United States) Wes Short Jr. | 300,000 |
| 2015 | (United States) Jeff Maggert | 202 | −14 | 2 strokes | (United States) Paul Goydos | 285,000 |
| 2014 | (Germany) Bernhard Langer | 200 | −16 | 1 stroke | (United States) Woody Austin (United States) Mark O'Meara | 277,500 |
| 2013 | (United States) Bart Bryant | 200 | −16 | 1 stroke | (United States) Russ Cochran (United States) Corey Pavin | 270,000 |
| 2012 | (United States) Willie Wood | 203 | −13 | Playoff | (United States) Michael Allen | 270,000 |
| 2011 | (United States) John Huston | 200 | −16 | 3 strokes | (Zimbabwe) Nick Price | 262,500 |
| 2010 | (United States) Loren Roberts | 201 | −15 | 1 stroke | (United States) Fred Funk | 255,000 |
| 2009 | (United States) Lonnie Nielsen | 195 | −21 | 2 strokes | (United States) Ronnie Black (United States) Fred Funk | 247,500 |
| 2008 | (Argentina) Eduardo Romero | 199 | −17 | 3 strokes | (South Africa) Fulton Allem (United States) Gary Koch | 240,000 |
| 2007 | (United States) R. W. Eaks | 199 | −17 | 3 strokes | (United States) Bruce Vaughan | 240,000 |

== Concert on the Green ==
A feature of the tournament is a concert presented adjacent to the 18th green after the conclusion of Friday play.

| Year | Concert |
|---|---|
| 2026 | Kelsea Ballerini |
| 2025 | Maroon 5 |
| 2024 | Luke Bryan |
| 2023 | Kenny Chesney |
| 2022 | Zac Brown Band |
| 2021 | Old Dominion |
| 2020 | No tournament |
| 2019 | Keith Urban |
| 2018 | Blake Shelton |
| 2017 | Bon Jovi |
| 2016 | Florida Georgia Line |
| 2015 | Sam Hunt (opening act), Lady Antebellum (headliner) |
| 2014 | Zac Brown Band |
| 2013 | Tim McGraw |
| 2012 | Sonia Leigh (opening act), Train (headliner) |
| 2011 | Maroon 5 |
| 2010 | Rob Thomas |
| 2009 | Huey Lewis and the News |
| 2008 | Hootie and the Blowfish, Colbie Caillat |
| 2007 | Eddie Money, Air Supply |
