= 2001 WGC-Accenture Match Play Championship =

Coordinates: 37.9112°S 145.0899°E

Tournament information
- Dates: 3–7 January 2001
- Location: Melbourne, Victoria, Australia
- Course: Metropolitan Golf Club
- Tour(s): PGA Tour; European Tour

Statistics
- Par: 72
- Length: 7,066
- Field: 64 players
- Prize fund: $5,000,000
- Winner's share: $1,000,000

Champion
- (United States) Steve Stricker
- def. Pierre Fulke 2&1

The 2001 WGC-Accenture Match Play Championship was a golf tournament that was played from 3–7 January 2001 at Metropolitan Golf Club in Melbourne, Victoria, Australia. It was the third WGC-Accenture Match Play Championship and the first of three World Golf Championships events held in 2001.

Steve Stricker won his first and only World Golf Championships event at the match-play, by defeating Pierre Fulke 2&1 in the 36 hole final.

== Brackets ==
The Championship was a single elimination match play event. The field consisted of the top 64 players available from the Official World Golf Rankings, seeded according to the rankings. Because it was played in Australia and also because it was very early in the year a large number of players chose not compete. These were: Tiger Woods (ranked 1), David Duval (3), Phil Mickelson (4), Lee Westwood (5), Colin Montgomerie (6), Davis Love III (7), Jesper Parnevik (11), Darren Clarke (12), Nick Price (13), Jim Furyk (15), Sergio García (16), Thomas Bjørn (20), Mike Weir (21), Loren Roberts (22), Carlos Franco (25), Miguel Ángel Jiménez (27), Paul Azinger (30), Rocco Mediate (32), Notah Begay III (33), José María Olazábal (34), Jeff Maggert (37), Fred Couples (39), Eduardo Romero (40), Greg Norman (42), Scott Hoch (46), Ángel Cabrera (47), Mark Calcavecchia (48), Shingo Katayama (53), Masashi Ozaki (67), Andrew Magee (73), Mark O'Meara (74), Lee Janzen (82), Ian Woosnam (83), Rory Sabbatini (85), Frank Lickliter (87), Stephen Ames (94), J. P. Hayes (95), Jarmo Sandelin (96), Bill Glasson (97) and Steve Elkington (101). The lowest player competing was Greg Kraft (104).

=== Bobby Jones bracket ===
First round 3 January
1	(South Africa) Ernie Els	3&2
16	(United States) Greg Kraft
8	(Japan) Hidemichi Tanaka	19h
9	(Germany) Bernhard Langer
5	(South Africa) Retief Goosen	2&1
12	(United States) Steve Lowery
4	(United States) Duffy Waldorf
13	(France) Jean van de Velde	19h
6	(Wales) Phillip Price
11	(Scotland) Andrew Coltart	3&2
3	(United States) David Toms	1up
14	(Japan) Hirofumi Miyase
7	(United States) Dennis Paulson
10	(Australia) Craig Parry	21h
2	(United States) John Huston
15	(United States) Craig Stadler	4&2

Second round 4 January
1	(South Africa) Ernie Els	1up
8	(Japan) Hidemichi Tanaka
5	(South Africa) Retief Goosen
13	(France) Jean van de Velde	4&3
11	(Scotland) Andrew Coltart	3&2
3	(United States) David Toms
10	(Australia) Craig Parry
15	(United States) Craig Stadler	7&6

Third round 5 January
1	(South Africa) Ernie Els	19h
13	(France) Jean van de Velde
11	(Scotland) Andrew Coltart
15	(United States) Craig Stadler	19h

Fourth round 6 January
1	(South Africa) Ernie Els	1up
15	(United States) Craig Stadler

=== Ben Hogan bracket ===
First round 3 January
1	(United States) Tom Lehman	2&1
16	(Australia) Greg Chalmers
8	(Japan) Joe Ozaki
9	(United States) Jeff Sluman	3&2
5	(Argentina) José Cóceres
12	(United States) Brad Faxon	3&2
4	(United States) Chris Perry	1up
13	(United States) Jonathan Kaye
6	(Sweden) Pierre Fulke	5&4
11	(United States) Fred Funk
3	(United States) Kirk Triplett
14	(United States) Glen Day	3&1
7	(Japan) Toshi Izawa	19h
10	(United States) Steve Pate
2	(New Zealand) Michael Campbell	4&3
15	(Sweden) Mathias Grönberg

Second round 4 January
1	(United States) Tom Lehman	3&2
9	(United States) Jeff Sluman
12	(United States) Brad Faxon	1up
4	(United States) Chris Perry
6	(Sweden) Pierre Fulke	20h
14	(United States) Glen Day
7	(Japan) Toshi Izawa
2	(New Zealand) Michael Campbell	5&4

Third round 5 January
1	(United States) Tom Lehman
12	(United States) Brad Faxon	1up
6	(Sweden) Pierre Fulke	1up
2	(New Zealand) Michael Campbell

Fourth round 6 January
12	(United States) Brad Faxon
6	(Sweden) Pierre Fulke	19h

=== Gary Player bracket ===
First round 3 January
1	(United States) Hal Sutton
16	(Australia) Nick O'Hern	21h
8	(United States) Franklin Langham
9	(United States) Tim Herron	2&1
5	(United States) Dudley Hart	6&5
12	(United States) Skip Kendall
4	(Australia) Robert Allenby	2&1
13	(Japan) Nobuhito Sato
6	(United States) Scott Verplank	19h
11	(United States) Brent Geiberger
3	(Republic of Ireland) Pádraig Harrington
14	(United States) Steve Stricker	2&1
7	(Scotland) Gary Orr	2&1
10	(Republic of Ireland) Paul McGinley
2	(United States) Justin Leonard	6&5
15	(Sweden) Patrik Sjöland

Second round 4 January
16	(Australia) Nick O'Hern	5&3
9	(United States) Tim Herron
5	(United States) Dudley Hart	5&4
4	(Australia) Robert Allenby
6	(United States) Scott Verplank
14	(United States) Steve Stricker	3&2
7	(Scotland) Gary Orr
2	(United States) Justin Leonard	20h

Third round 5 January
16	(Australia) Nick O'Hern	5&4
6	(United States) Dudley Hart
14	(United States) Steve Stricker	6&5
2	(United States) Justin Leonard

Fourth round 6 January
16	(Australia) Nick O'Hern
14	(United States) Steve Stricker	20h

=== Sam Snead bracket ===
First round 3 January
1	(Fiji) Vijay Singh	4&2
16	(United States) Kevin Sutherland
8	(Japan) Toru Taniguchi	3&2
9	(United States) Bob Estes
5	(United States) Steve Flesch
12	(Sweden) Per-Ulrik Johansson	5&4
4	(Australia) Stuart Appleby	1up
13	(United States) Kenny Perry
6	(Japan) Shigeki Maruyama	2&1
11	(United States) Scott Dunlap
3	(United States) Bob May	2&1
14	(United States) Tom Scherrer
7	(Scotland) Paul Lawrie	5&4
10	(United States) Chris DiMarco
2	(United States) Stewart Cink
15	(Zimbabwe) Mark McNulty	1up

Second round 4 January
1	(Fiji) Vijay Singh
8	(Japan) Toru Taniguchi	1up
12	(Sweden) Per-Ulrik Johansson
4	(Australia) Stuart Appleby	4&3
6	(Japan) Shigeki Maruyama	22h
3	(United States) Bob May
7	(Scotland) Paul Lawrie
15	(Zimbabwe) Mark McNulty	5&4

Third round 5 January
8	(Japan) Toru Taniguchi	2&1
4	(Australia) Stuart Appleby
6	(Japan) Shigeki Maruyama	4&3
15	(Zimbabwe) Mark McNulty

Fourth round 6 January
8	(Japan) Toru Taniguchi	2&1
6	(Japan) Shigeki Maruyama

=== Final Four ===
Semi-finals; 6 January
1	(South Africa) Ernie Els
6	(Sweden) Pierre Fulke	2&1
14	(United States) Steve Stricker	2&1
8	(Japan) Toru Taniguchi

Finals; 7 January
6	(Sweden) Pierre Fulke
14	(United States) Steve Stricker	2&1
Third place
1	(South Africa) Ernie Els
8	(Japan) Toru Taniguchi	4&3

== Prize money breakdown ==
Place	US ($)
Champion	1,000,000
Runner-up	500,000
Third place	400,000
Fourth place	300,000
Losing quarter-finalists x 4	150,000
Losing third round x 8	75,000
Losing second round x 16	50,000
Losing first round x 32	25,000
Total	$5,000,000
