= Sanford International =

Coordinates: 43.5311°N 96.7658°W

Tournament information
- Location: Sioux Falls, South Dakota
- Established: 2018
- Course: Minnehaha Country Club
- Par: 70
- Length: 6,437 yards (5,886 m)
- Organized by: Pro Links Sports
- Tour: PGA Tour Champions
- Format: Stroke play
- Prize fund: US$2,200,000
- Month played: September

Tournament record score
- Aggregate: 194 Steve Stricker (2023)
- To par: −16 as above

Current champion
- (United States) Zach Johnson

Location map
- Location in the United States Location in South Dakota

The Sanford International is a PGA Tour Champions event in Sioux Falls, South Dakota, at Minnehaha Country Club, making its debut in September 2018. The tournament is sponsored by Sanford Health.

Steve Stricker won the inaugural event.

== Winners ==
Year	Winner	Score	To par	Margin of victory	Runner(s)-up	Purse ($)	Winner's share ($)
2026	(United States) Zach Johnson	199	−11	1 stroke	(United States) Ben Crane	2,200,000	315,000
2025	(South Africa) Retief Goosen	197	−13	2 strokes	(United States) Bo Van Pelt	2,200,000	315,000
2024	(United States) Steve Stricker (4)	202	−8	Playoff	(Australia) Richard Green	2,000,000	300,000
2023	(United States) Steve Stricker (3)	194	−16	1 stroke	(South Korea) K. J. Choi	2,000,000	300,000
2022	(United States) Steve Stricker (2)	196	−14	Playoff	(Sweden) Robert Karlsson	2,000,000	300,000
2021	(Northern Ireland) Darren Clarke	198	−12	Playoff	(South Korea) K. J. Choi (United States) Steve Flesch	1,800,000	270,000
2020	(Spain) Miguel Ángel Jiménez	196	−14	1 stroke	(United States) Steve Flesch	1,800,000	270,000
2019	(United States) Rocco Mediate	201	−9	2 strokes	(United States) Ken Duke (United States) Bob Estes (Scotland) Colin Montgomerie	1,800,000	270,000
2018	(United States) Steve Stricker	197	−13	4 strokes	(United States) Tim Petrovic (United States) Jerry Smith	1,800,000	270,000

== Records ==
- Oldest winner: 57 years, 205 days, Steve Stricker, (2024)
- Youngest winner: 51 years, 212 days, Steve Stricker, (2018)
- Most victories: 4, Steve Stricker, (2018, 2022, 2023, 2024)
- Lowest score after 36 holes: 129, K.J. Choi, (63-66), (2021)
- Lowest final score: 196, Miguel Ángel Jiménez, (65-66-65, 196), (2020)
- Lowest final score in relation to par: −14, Miguel Ángel Jiménez, (65-66-65, 196), (2020)
- Greatest victory margin: 4 strokes, Steve Stricker, (2018)
- Lowest round: 62, Darren Clarke, 2nd round, (2020); Scott Parel, 3rd round, (2020)
- Lowest round in relation to par: −8, Darren Clarke, 2nd round, (2020); Scott Parel, 3rd round, (2020)
- Wire-to-Wire Winners: Steve Stricker in 2018 & Miguel Ángel Jiménez in 2020
- Most runner-up finishes: 2, Steve Flesch, (2020 & 2021)
