= 2022 PGA Tour Champions season =

Golf tour season

- Duration: January 20, 2022 – November 13, 2022
- Number of official events: 27 (Note: One further tournament was scheduled but was removed from the schedule.)
- Most wins: (New Zealand) Steven Alker (4) (Republic of Ireland) Pádraig Harrington (4) (United States) Steve Stricker (4)
- Charles Schwab Cup: (New Zealand) Steven Alker
- Money list: (New Zealand) Steven Alker
- Player of the Year: (New Zealand) Steven Alker
- Rookie of the Year: (Republic of Ireland) Pádraig Harrington

The 2022 PGA Tour Champions season was the 42nd season of PGA Tour Champions (formerly the Senior PGA Tour and the Champions Tour), the main professional golf tour in the United States for men aged 50 and over.

== Schedule ==
The following table lists official events during the 2022 season.

Date	Tournament	Location	Purse (US$)	Winner (Note: The number in parentheses after each winner's name is the number of PGA Tour Champions events they had won up to and including that tournament. This information is only shown for PGA Tour Champions members.)	Notes
Jan 22	Mitsubishi Electric Championship at Hualalai	Hawaii	2,000,000	(Spain) Miguel Ángel Jiménez (11)	
Feb 20	Chubb Classic	Florida	1,600,000	(Germany) Bernhard Langer (43)	
Feb 27	Cologuard Classic	Arizona	1,800,000	(Spain) Miguel Ángel Jiménez (12)	
Mar 6	Hoag Classic	California	2,000,000	(South Africa) Retief Goosen (2)	
~~Mar 20~~	Trophy Hassan II	Morocco	–	Removed	New to PGA Tour Champions
Apr 3	Rapiscan Systems Classic	Mississippi	1,600,000	(New Zealand) Steven Alker (2)	
Apr 24	ClubCorp Classic	Texas	2,000,000	(United States) Scott Parel (4)	New tournament
May 1	Insperity Invitational	Texas	2,300,000	(New Zealand) Steven Alker (3)	
May 8	Mitsubishi Electric Classic	Georgia	1,800,000	(United States) Steve Flesch (2)	
May 15	Regions Tradition	Alabama	2,500,000	(United States) Steve Stricker (8)	PGA Tour Champions major championship
May 29	KitchenAid Senior PGA Championship	Michigan	3,500,000	(New Zealand) Steven Alker (4)	Senior major championship
Jun 5	Principal Charity Classic	Iowa	1,850,000	(United States) Jerry Kelly (9)	
Jun 12	American Family Insurance Championship	Wisconsin	2,400,000	(Thailand) Thongchai Jaidee (1)	
Jun 26	U.S. Senior Open	Pennsylvania	4,000,000	(Republic of Ireland) Pádraig Harrington (1)	Senior major championship
Jul 10	Bridgestone Senior Players Championship	Ohio	3,000,000	(United States) Jerry Kelly (10)	PGA Tour Champions major championship
Jul 24	The Senior Open Championship	Scotland	2,500,000	(Northern Ireland) Darren Clarke (4)	Senior major championship
Aug 7	Shaw Charity Classic	Canada	2,350,000	(United States) Jerry Kelly (11)	
Aug 14	Boeing Classic	Washington	2,200,000	(Spain) Miguel Ángel Jiménez (13)	
Aug 21	Dick's Sporting Goods Open	New York	2,100,000	(Republic of Ireland) Pádraig Harrington (2)	
Aug 28	The Ally Challenge	Michigan	2,000,000	(United States) Steve Stricker (9)	
Sep 11	Ascension Charity Classic	Missouri	2,000,000	(Republic of Ireland) Pádraig Harrington (3)	
Sep 18	Sanford International	South Dakota	2,000,000	(United States) Steve Stricker (10)	
Sep 25	PURE Insurance Championship	California	2,200,000	(United States) Steve Flesch (3)	
Oct 9	Constellation Furyk and Friends	Florida	2,000,000	(United States) Steve Stricker (11)	
Oct 16	SAS Championship	North Carolina	2,100,000	(United States) Fred Couples (14)	
Oct 23	Dominion Energy Charity Classic	Virginia	2,200,000	(New Zealand) Steven Alker (5)	Charles Schwab Cup playoff event
Nov 6	TimberTech Championship	Florida	2,200,000	(Germany) Bernhard Langer (44)	Charles Schwab Cup playoff event
Nov 13	Charles Schwab Cup Championship	Arizona	2,500,000	(Republic of Ireland) Pádraig Harrington (4)	Charles Schwab Cup playoff event

=== Unofficial events ===
The following events were sanctioned by PGA Tour Champions, but did not carry official money, nor were wins official.

Date	Tournament	Location	Purse ($)	Winners	Notes
Dec 18	PNC Championship	Florida	1,085,000	(Fiji) Vijay Singh and son Qass Singh	Team event

== Charles Schwab Cup ==
The Charles Schwab Cup was based on tournament results during the season, calculated using a points-based system.

Position	Player	Points
1	(New Zealand) Steven Alker	4,173,435
2	(Republic of Ireland) Pádraig Harrington	4,015,455
3	(United States) Jerry Kelly	2,570,225
4	(United States) Steve Stricker	2,473,725
5	(Spain) Miguel Ángel Jiménez	2,461,086

== Money list ==
The money list was based on prize money won during the season, calculated in U.S. dollars.

Position	Player	Prize money ($)
1	(New Zealand) Steven Alker	3,544,425
2	(Republic of Ireland) Pádraig Harrington	3,293,255
3	(United States) Steve Stricker	2,473,725
4	(United States) Jerry Kelly	2,364,329
5	(Spain) Miguel Ángel Jiménez	2,247,749

== Awards ==
Award	Winner	Ref.
Player of the Year (Jack Nicklaus Trophy)	(New Zealand) Steven Alker	
Rookie of the Year	(Republic of Ireland) Pádraig Harrington	
Scoring leader (Byron Nelson Award)	(New Zealand) Steven Alker	
