= Chubb Classic =

Annual golf tournament in Florida, U.S.

Coordinates: 26.091°N 81.700°W

Tournament information
- Location: Naples, Florida
- Established: 1988
- Courses: Tiburón Golf Club (Black Course)
- Par: 72
- Length: 6,881 yards (6,292 m)
- Tour: PGA Tour Champions
- Format: Stroke play
- Prize fund: US$1,800,000
- Month played: February

Tournament record score
- Aggregate: 196 Bernhard Langer (2011); 196 Kenny Perry (2012); 196 Scott Parel (2020)
- To par: −20 Bernhard Langer (2011) −20 Kenny Perry (2012)

Current champion
- (United States) David Toms

Final champion
- Location in the United States Location in Florida

The Chubb Classic is a golf tournament on the PGA Tour Champions, held annually in February in Naples, Florida. It has been played at a variety of courses, and Chubb Corporation is the main sponsor.

It debuted 38 years ago in 1988 as the Aetna Challenge,. The purse in 2016 was $1.6 million with a winner's share of $240,000.

For 2021, the event moves to Tiburón Golf Club, but on the Black Course, which will be the first time it has been used in professional play. Tiburón's Gold Course is used for the QBE Challenge and CME Group Tour Championship, but this will be the first use of the secondary course.

== Host courses ==
Years	Course
1988–1990	The Club at Pelican Bay
1991–1995	The Vineyards Golf and Country Club
1996	The Classics at Lely Resort
1997–1999	Bay Colony Golf Club
2000–2001	Pelican Marsh Golf Club
2002–2006	The TwinEagles Club (Talon)
2007–2008	Quail West Golf and Country Club
2009	TPC Treviso Bay
2010–2011	The Quarry
2012–2018	The TwinEagles Club (Talon)
2019–2020	The Classics at Lely Resort
2021	Tiburón Golf Club (Black Course)

== Winners ==
Year	Winner	Score	To par	Margin of victory	Runner(s)-up	Purse ($)
Chubb Classic
2026	(United States) David Toms	203	−13	1 stroke	(United States) Justin Leonard (United States) Boo Weekley (Australia) Michael Wright	1,800,000
2025	(United States) Justin Leonard	201	−15	4 strokes	(United States) Billy Andrade	1,800,000
2024	(Canada) Stephen Ames	131 (Note: Shortened to 36 holes due to weather.)	−13	3 strokes	(United States) Rocco Mediate	1,800,000
2023	(Germany) Bernhard Langer (5)	199	−17	3 strokes	(Republic of Ireland) Pádraig Harrington (United States) Steve Stricker	1,800,000
2022	(Germany) Bernhard Langer (4)	200	−16	3 strokes	(United States) Tim Petrovic	1,600,000
2021	(United States) Steve Stricker	200	−16	1 stroke	(Germany) Alex Čejka (Sweden) Robert Karlsson	1,600,000
2020	(United States) Scott Parel	196	−17	2 strokes	(United States) Bob Estes	1,600,000
2019	(Spain) Miguel Ángel Jiménez	200	−13	Playoff	(United States) Olin Browne (Germany) Bernhard Langer	1,600,000
2018	(United States) Joe Durant	197	−19	4 strokes	(United States) Steve Stricker (United States) Billy Mayfair (United States) David Toms (United States) Tim Petrovic (United States) Lee Janzen	1,600,000
2017	(United States) Fred Couples (2)	200	−16	3 strokes	(Spain) Miguel Ángel Jiménez	1,600,000
2016	(Germany) Bernhard Langer (3)	201	−15	3 strokes	(United States) Fred Couples	1,600,000
ACE Group Classic
2015	(United States) Lee Janzen	200	−16	Playoff	(United States) Bart Bryant	1,600,000
2014	(United States) Kirk Triplett	200	−16	1 stroke	(United States) Olin Browne (Germany) Bernhard Langer (United States) Duffy Waldorf	1,600,000
2013	(Germany) Bernhard Langer (2)	204	−12	1 stroke	(United States) Jay Don Blake	1,600,000
2012	(United States) Kenny Perry	196	−20	5 strokes	(Germany) Bernhard Langer	1,600,000
2011	(Germany) Bernhard Langer	196	−20	4 strokes	(United States) Fred Funk	1,600,000
2010	(United States) Fred Couples	199	−17	1 stroke	(United States) Tommy Armour III	1,600,000
2009	(United States) Loren Roberts (2)	209	−7	1 stroke	(United States) Gene Jones	1,600,000
2008	(United States) Scott Hoch	202	−14	Playoff	(United States) Brad Bryant (United States) Tom Jenkins (United States) Tom Kite	1,600,000
2007	(United States) Bobby Wadkins	201	−15	1 stroke	(United States) Allen Doyle	1,600,000
2006	(United States) Loren Roberts	202	−14	1 stroke	(United States) R. W. Eaks (United States) Brad Bryant	1,600,000
2005	(England) Mark James	203	−13	2 strokes	(United States) Tom Wargo (United States) Hale Irwin	1,600,000
2004	(United States) Craig Stadler	206	−10	Playoff	(United States) Gary Koch (United States) Tom Watson	1,600,000
2003	(Argentina) Vicente Fernández	202	−14	3 strokes	(Republic of Ireland) Des Smyth (United States) Tom Watson	1,600,000
2002	(United States) Hale Irwin (2)	200	−16	1 stroke	(United States) Tom Watson	1,500,000
2001	(United States) Gil Morgan (2)	200	−16	2 strokes	(United States) Dana Quigley	1,400,000
2000	(United States) Lanny Wadkins	202	−14	Playoff	(Spain) José María Cañizares (United States) Walter Hall (United States) Tom Watson	1,200,000
1999	(United States) Allen Doyle	203	−13	5 strokes	(Argentina) Vicente Fernández	1,200,000
LG Championship
1998	(United States) Gil Morgan	210	−6	2 strokes	(United States) Dale Douglass (United States) Raymond Floyd	1,200,000
1997	(United States) Hale Irwin	201	−15	1 stroke	(United States) Bob Murphy	1,000,000
Greater Naples IntelliNet Challenge
1996	(United States) Al Geiberger	202	−14	1 stroke	(Japan) Isao Aoki	600,000
IntelliNet Challenge
1995	(United States) Bob Murphy	137	−7	1 stroke	(United States) Raymond Floyd	600,000
1994	(United States) Mike Hill (2)	201	−15	3 strokes	(United States) Tom Wargo	500,000
Better Homes & Gardens Real Estate Challenge
1993	(United States) Mike Hill	202	−14	2 strokes	(United States) Dave Stockton	500,000
Aetna Challenge
1992	(United States) Jimmy Powell	197	−19	4 strokes	(United States) Lee Trevino	450,000
1991	(United States) Lee Trevino (2)	205	−11	1 stroke	(United States) Dale Douglass	450,000
1990	(United States) Lee Trevino	200	−16	1 stroke	(Australia) Bruce Crampton	400,000
1989	(United States) Gene Littler	209	−7	2 strokes	(South Africa) Harold Henning	300,000
1988	(South Africa) Gary Player	207	−9	1 stroke	(United States) Dave Hill	300,000

== Multiple winners ==
Seven players have won this tournament more than once through 2022.

- 5 wins
  - Bernhard Langer: 2011, 2013, 2016, 2022, 2023
- 2 wins
  - Fred Couples: 2010, 2017
  - Loren Roberts: 2006, 2009
  - Hale Irwin: 1997, 2002
  - Gil Morgan: 1998, 2001
  - Mike Hill: 1993, 1994 (consecutive)
  - Lee Trevino: 1990, 1991 (consecutive)
