= PURE Insurance Championship =

PGA Tour Champions golf tournament

Coordinates: 36.56°N 121.95°W

Tournament information
- Location: Monterey, California
- Established: 2004
- Courses: Pebble Beach Golf Links; Spyglass Hill Golf Course
- Par: 72 (PB); 71 (PH)
- Length: 7,040 yards (6,440 m) (PB); 7,002 yards (6,403 m) (PH)
- Tour: PGA Tour Champions
- Format: Stroke play
- Prize fund: US$2,400,000
- Month played: September

Tournament record score
- Aggregate: 198 Bernhard Langer (2017)
- To par: −17 as above

Current champion
- (United States) Zach Johnson

Location map
- Location in the United States Location in California

The PURE Insurance Championship is a golf tournament on the PGA Tour Champions. It is sponsored by the PURE Insurance company and normally held in August/September in Monterey, California at the Pebble Beach Golf Links and Del Monte Golf Course, but has also been played in July. In 2014, it was played at Pebble Beach and Poppy Hills Golf Course.

== History ==
It is an official PGA Tour Champions event that pairs one junior with one senior, PGA Tour Champions player and two amateurs. Seventy-eight junior spots are awarded, seventy chosen from two selection processes and eight exemptions are selected through The First Tee of Monterey County and Monterey Peninsula Foundation, the host organization.

The purse for the 2012 tournament was US$1,800,000, with $255,000 going to the winner. The tournament was founded in 2004 as The First Tee Open at Pebble Beach presented by Wal-Mart. The First Tee of Monterey County is one of the direct receivers of the proceeds made from this tournament. Walmart was the title sponsor of this event from 2004 to 2009. National Association for Home Care & Hospice was the title sponsor for 2010. Nature Valley was the title sponsor for the 2011 tournament.

== Tournament hosts ==
| Venue | Years | Times |
|---|---|---|
| Pebble Beach Golf Links | 2004–present | 22 |
| Spyglass Hill Golf Course | 2020–present | 6 |
| Poppy Hills Golf Course | 2014–2019 | 6 |
| Del Monte Golf Course | 2004–2013 | 10 |

== Winners ==
| Year | Winner | Score | To par | Margin of victory | Runner(s)-up |
PURE Insurance Championship
| 2026 | (United States) Zach Johnson | 202 | −14 | 2 strokes | (New Zealand) Steven Alker (Slovakia) Rory Sabbatini (Sweden) Henrik Stenson |
| 2025 | (United States) Doug Barron | 204 | −12 | 1 stroke | (Fiji) Vijay Singh |
| 2024 | (England) Paul Broadhurst (2) | 202 | −14 | 3 strokes | (Germany) Alex Čejka |
| 2023 | (Thailand) Thongchai Jaidee | 202 | −14 | Playoff | (United States) Justin Leonard |
| 2022 | (United States) Steve Flesch | 205 | −11 | 1 stroke | (New Zealand) Steven Alker (South Africa) Ernie Els (United States) Paul Stankowski |
| 2021 | (South Korea) K. J. Choi | 203 | −13 | 2 strokes | (Germany) Alex Čejka (Germany) Bernhard Langer |
| 2020 | (United States) Jim Furyk | 204 | −12 | Playoff | (United States) Jerry Kelly |
| 2019 | (United States) Kirk Triplett (3) | 206 | −9 | Playoff | (United States) Billy Andrade |
| 2018 | (United States) Ken Tanigawa | 205 | −10 | 1 stroke | (United States) Marco Dawson (United States) Kirk Triplett |
| 2017 | (Germany) Bernhard Langer | 198 | −17 | 3 strokes | (United States) Jerry Kelly |
Nature Valley First Tee Open at Pebble Beach
| 2016 | (England) Paul Broadhurst | 204 | −11 | 1 stroke | (Germany) Bernhard Langer (United States) Kevin Sutherland |
| 2015 | (Mexico) Esteban Toledo | 206 | −9 | 1 stroke | (United States) Tom Watson |
| 2014 | (United States) John Cook | 204 | −11 | 1 stroke | (United States) Tom Byrum |
| 2013 | (United States) Kirk Triplett (2) | 205 | −11 | 2 strokes | (United States) Dan Forsman (United States) Doug Garwood |
| 2012 | (United States) Kirk Triplett | 206 | −10 | 2 strokes | (Republic of Ireland) Mark McNulty |
| 2011 | (United States) Jeff Sluman (3) | 206 | −10 | 2 strokes | (United States) Brad Bryant (United States) David Eger (United States) Jay Haas |
Home Care & Hospice First Tee Open at Pebble Beach
| 2010 | (United States) Ted Schulz | 202 | −14 | 1 stroke | (United States) Tom Pernice Jr. |
Walmart First Tee Open at Pebble Beach
| 2009 | (United States) Jeff Sluman (2) | 206 | −10 | 2 strokes | (United States) Gene Jones |
| 2008 | (United States) Jeff Sluman | 202 | −14 | 5 strokes | (United States) Craig Stadler (United States) Fuzzy Zoeller |
Wal-Mart First Tee Open at Pebble Beach
| 2007 | (United States) Gil Morgan | 202 | −14 | 2 strokes | (United States) Hale Irwin |
| 2006 | (United States) Scott Simpson | 204 | −12 | 1 stroke | (United States) David Edwards (United States) Jay Haas |
| 2005 | (United States) Hale Irwin | 203 | −13 | 1 stroke | (United States) Morris Hatalsky (United States) Gil Morgan (United States) Craig Stadler |
The First Tee Open at Pebble Beach
| 2004 | (United States) Craig Stadler | 201 | −15 | 3 strokes | (United States) Jay Haas |

== Multiple winners ==
Three players have won this tournament more than once through 2024.

- 3 wins
  - Jeff Sluman: 2008, 2009, 2011
  - Kirk Triplett: 2012, 2013, 2019
- 2 wins
  - Paul Broadhurst: 2016, 2024

== Pebble Beach Double ==
Two players have won this tournament and the PGA Tour tournament (AT&T Pebble Beach National Pro-Am) held at Pebble Beach in their careers.

| Golfer | PGA Tour win | PGA Tour Champions win |
|---|---|---|
| John Cook | 1981 | 2014 |
| Hale Irwin | 1984 | 2005 |
