= Toshiba Classic =

Toshiba Classic may refer to:

- the Acura Classic, a tennis tournament known as the Toshiba Classic from 1994 to 1998.
- the Toshiba Classic (golf), a golf tournament.
