= 2023 PGA Tour Champions season =

Golf tour season

- Duration: January 19, 2023 – November 12, 2023
- Number of official events: 28
- Most wins: (United States) Steve Stricker (6)
- Charles Schwab Cup: (United States) Steve Stricker
- Money list: (United States) Steve Stricker
- Player of the Year: (United States) Steve Stricker

The 2023 PGA Tour Champions season was the 43rd season of PGA Tour Champions (formerly the Senior PGA Tour and the Champions Tour), the main professional golf tour in the United States for men aged 50 and over.

== Schedule ==
The following table lists official events during the 2023 season.

Date	Tournament	Location	Purse (US$)	Winner (Note: The number in parentheses after each winner's name is the number of PGA Tour Champions events they had won up to and including that tournament. This information is only shown for PGA Tour Champions members.)	Notes
Jan 21	Mitsubishi Electric Championship at Hualalai	Hawaii	2,000,000	(United States) Steve Stricker (12)	
Feb 11	Trophy Hassan II	Morocco	2,000,000	(Canada) Stephen Ames (3)	New to PGA Tour Champions (Note: Tournament's debut on PGA Tour Champions delayed from 2022.)
Feb 19	Chubb Classic	Florida	1,800,000	(Germany) Bernhard Langer (45)	
Mar 5	Cologuard Classic	Arizona	2,200,000	(United States) David Toms (3)	
Mar 19	Hoag Classic	California	2,000,000	(South Africa) Ernie Els (3)	
Mar 26	Galleri Classic	California	2,200,000	(United States) David Toms (4)	New tournament
Apr 23	Invited Celebrity Classic	Texas	2,000,000	(Australia) Mark Hensby (1)	
Apr 30	Insperity Invitational	Texas	2,700,000	(New Zealand) Steven Alker (6)	
May 7	Mitsubishi Electric Classic	Georgia	1,800,000	(Canada) Stephen Ames (4)	
May 14	Regions Tradition	Alabama	2,500,000	(United States) Steve Stricker (13)	PGA Tour Champions major championship
May 28	KitchenAid Senior PGA Championship	Texas	3,500,000	(United States) Steve Stricker (14)	Senior major championship
Jun 4	Principal Charity Classic	Iowa	2,000,000	(Canada) Stephen Ames (5)	
Jun 11	American Family Insurance Championship	Wisconsin	2,400,000	(United States) Steve Stricker (15)	
Jun 25	Dick's Sporting Goods Open	New York	2,100,000	(Republic of Ireland) Pádraig Harrington (5)	
Jul 2	U.S. Senior Open	Wisconsin	4,000,000	(Germany) Bernhard Langer (46)	Senior major championship
Jul 16	Kaulig Companies Championship	Ohio	3,500,000	(United States) Steve Stricker (16)	PGA Tour Champions major championship
Jul 30	The Senior Open Championship	Wales	2,750,000	(Germany) Alex Čejka (3)	Senior major championship
Aug 13	Boeing Classic	Washington	2,200,000	(Canada) Stephen Ames (6)	
Aug 20	Shaw Charity Classic	Canada	2,400,000	(United States) Ken Duke (1)	
Aug 27	The Ally Challenge	Michigan	2,000,000	(Fiji) Vijay Singh (5)	
Sep 10	Ascension Charity Classic	Missouri	2,000,000	(United States) Steve Flesch (4)	
Sep 17	Sanford International	South Dakota	2,000,000	(United States) Steve Stricker (17)	
Sep 24	PURE Insurance Championship	California	2,300,000	(Thailand) Thongchai Jaidee (2)	
Oct 8	Constellation Furyk and Friends	Florida	2,000,000	(United States) Brett Quigley (2)	
Oct 15	SAS Championship	North Carolina	2,100,000	(Australia) Rod Pampling (2)	
Oct 22	Dominion Energy Charity Classic	Virginia	2,200,000	(United States) Harrison Frazar (1)	Charles Schwab Cup playoff event
Nov 5	TimberTech Championship	Florida	2,200,000	(Republic of Ireland) Pádraig Harrington (6)	Charles Schwab Cup playoff event
Nov 12	Charles Schwab Cup Championship	Arizona	3,000,000	(New Zealand) Steven Alker (7)	Charles Schwab Cup playoff event

=== Unofficial events ===
The following events were sanctioned by PGA Tour Champions, but did not carry official money, nor were wins official.

Date	Tournament	Location	Purse ($)	Winners	Notes
Dec 10	World Champions Cup	Florida	1,350,000	Team USA	New team event
Dec 17	PNC Championship	Florida	1,085,000	(Germany) Bernhard Langer and son Jason Langer	Team event

== Charles Schwab Cup ==
The Charles Schwab Cup was based on tournament results during the season, calculated using a points-based system.

Position	Player	Points
1	(United States) Steve Stricker	3,986,063
2	(New Zealand) Steven Alker	3,173,127
3	(South Africa) Ernie Els	2,642,983
4	(Republic of Ireland) Pádraig Harrington	2,614,746
5	(Germany) Bernhard Langer	2,532,490

== Money list ==
The money list was based on prize money won during the season, calculated in U.S. dollars.

Position	Player	Prize money ($)
1	(United States) Steve Stricker	3,986,063
2	(New Zealand) Steven Alker	2,607,089
3	(Germany) Bernhard Langer	2,240,016
4	(South Africa) Ernie Els	2,166,383
5	(Canada) Stephen Ames	2,130,194

== Awards ==
Award	Winner	Ref.
Player of the Year (Jack Nicklaus Trophy)	(United States) Steve Stricker	
Scoring leader (Byron Nelson Award)	(United States) Steve Stricker	
