= 2024 PGA Tour Champions season =

Golf tour season

- Duration: January 18, 2024 – November 10, 2024
- Number of official events: 28
- Most wins: (Canada) Stephen Ames (3) (South Africa) Ernie Els (3) (Republic of Ireland) Pádraig Harrington (3)
- Charles Schwab Cup: (New Zealand) Steven Alker
- Money list: (New Zealand) Steven Alker
- Player of the Year: (New Zealand) Steven Alker
- Rookie of the Year: (Argentina) Ricardo González

The 2024 PGA Tour Champions season was the 44th season of PGA Tour Champions (formerly the Senior PGA Tour and the Champions Tour), the main professional golf tour in the United States for men aged 50 and over.

== Schedule ==
The following table lists official events during the 2024 season.

Date	Tournament	Location	Purse (US$)	Winner (Note: The number in parentheses after each winner's name is the number of PGA Tour Champions events they had won up to and including that tournament. This information is only shown for PGA Tour Champions members.)	Notes
Jan 20	Mitsubishi Electric Championship at Hualalai	Hawaii	2,000,000	(New Zealand) Steven Alker (8)	
Feb 18	Chubb Classic	Florida	1,800,000	(Canada) Stephen Ames (7)	
Feb 24	Trophy Hassan II	Morocco	2,000,000	(Argentina) Ricardo González (1)	
Mar 10	Cologuard Classic	Arizona	2,200,000	(United States) Joe Durant (5)	
Mar 24	Hoag Classic Newport Beach	California	2,000,000	(Republic of Ireland) Pádraig Harrington (7)	
Mar 31	Galleri Classic	California	2,200,000	(South Africa) Retief Goosen (3)	
Apr 21	Invited Celebrity Classic	Texas	2,200,000	(England) Paul Broadhurst (6)	
Apr 28	Mitsubishi Electric Classic	Georgia	2,000,000	(Canada) Stephen Ames (8)	
May 5	Insperity Invitational	Texas	2,700,000	(United States) Scott Dunlap (2)	
May 12	Regions Tradition	Alabama	2,600,000	(United States) Doug Barron (3)	PGA Tour Champions major championship
May 26	KitchenAid Senior PGA Championship	Michigan	3,500,000	(England) Richard Bland (1)	Senior major championship
Jun 2	Principal Charity Classic	Iowa	2,000,000	(South Africa) Ernie Els (4)	
Jun 9	American Family Insurance Championship	Wisconsin	2,400,000	(South Africa) Ernie Els (5)	
Jun 23	Dick's Open	New York	2,100,000	(Republic of Ireland) Pádraig Harrington (8)	
Jul 1	U.S. Senior Open	Rhode Island	4,000,000	(England) Richard Bland (2)	Senior major championship
Jul 14	Kaulig Companies Championship	Ohio	3,500,000	(South Africa) Ernie Els (6)	PGA Tour Champions major championship
Jul 28	The Senior Open Championship	Scotland	2,850,000	(South Korea) K. J. Choi (2)	Senior major championship
Aug 11	Boeing Classic	Washington	2,200,000	(Canada) Stephen Ames (9)	
Aug 18	Rogers Charity Classic	Canada	2,400,000	(United States) Ken Tanigawa (3)	
Aug 25	The Ally Challenge	Michigan	2,200,000	(United States) Stewart Cink (1)	
Sep 8	Ascension Charity Classic	Missouri	2,000,000	(South Korea) Yang Yong-eun (1)	
Sep 15	Sanford International	South Dakota	2,000,000	(United States) Steve Stricker (18)	
Sep 22	PURE Insurance Championship	California	2,300,000	(England) Paul Broadhurst (7)	
Oct 6	Constellation Furyk and Friends	Florida	2,100,000	(United States) Rocco Mediate (5)	
Oct 13	SAS Championship	North Carolina	2,100,000	(United States) Jerry Kelly (12)	
Oct 20	Dominion Energy Charity Classic	Virginia	2,300,000	(United States) Timothy O'Neal (1)	Charles Schwab Cup playoff event
Oct 27	Simmons Bank Championship	Arkansas	2,300,000	(Republic of Ireland) Pádraig Harrington (9)	Charles Schwab Cup playoff event (Note: Also a new tournament.)
Nov 10	Charles Schwab Cup Championship	Arizona	3,000,000	(Germany) Bernhard Langer (47)	Charles Schwab Cup playoff event

=== Unofficial events ===
The following events were sanctioned by PGA Tour Champions, but did not carry official money, nor were wins official.

Date	Tournament	Location	Purse ($)	Winners	Notes
~~Dec 15~~	World Champions Cup	Florida	–	Canceled (Note: Canceled due to Hurricane Helene and Hurricane Milton.)	Team event
Dec 22	PNC Championship	Florida	1,085,000	(Germany) Bernhard Langer and son Jason Langer	Team event

== Charles Schwab Cup ==
The Charles Schwab Cup was based on tournament results during the season, calculated using a points-based system.

Position	Player	Points
1	(New Zealand) Steven Alker	2,781,203
2	(South Africa) Ernie Els	2,496,234
3	(Australia) Richard Green	2,488,239
4	(Republic of Ireland) Pádraig Harrington	2,214,543
5	(Canada) Stephen Ames	2,195,405

== Money list ==
The money list was based on prize money won during the season, calculated in U.S. dollars.

Position	Player	Prize money ($)
1	(New Zealand) Steven Alker	2,447,588
2	(South Africa) Ernie Els	2,356,976
3	(Australia) Richard Green	2,168,079
4	(Canada) Stephen Ames	2,113,895
5	(South Korea) Yang Yong-eun	1,767,957

== Awards ==
Award	Winner	Ref.
Player of the Year (Jack Nicklaus Trophy)	(New Zealand) Steven Alker	
Rookie of the Year (Hale Irwin Award)	(Argentina) Ricardo González	
Scoring leader (Byron Nelson Award)	(New Zealand) Steven Alker	
