= Steve Flesch =

American professional golfer

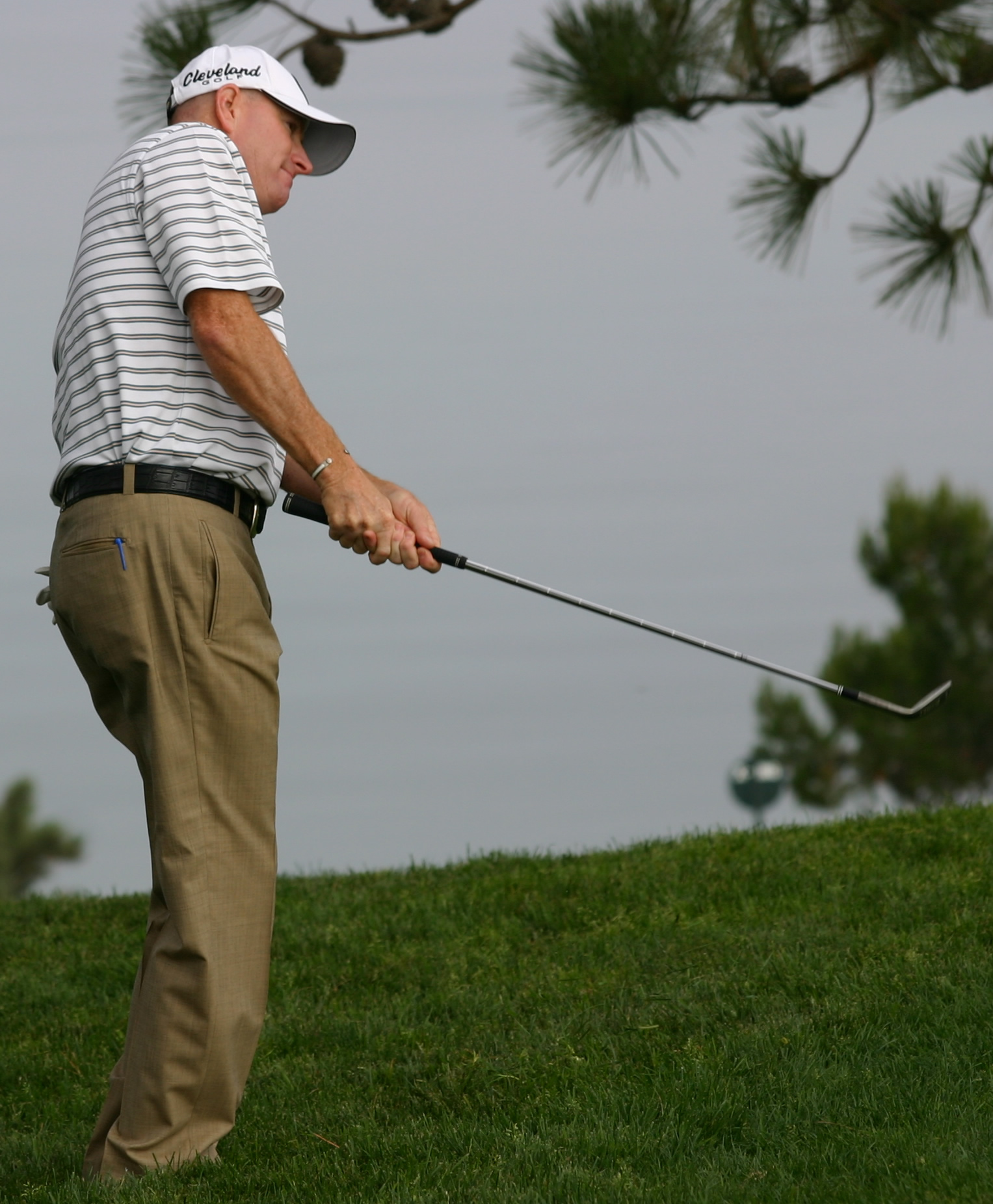

Personal information
- Full name: Stephen J. Flesch
- Nationality: United States
- Born: May 23, 1967 (age 59) Cincinnati, Ohio, U.S.
- Height: 5 ft 11 in (1.80 m)
- Weight: 165 lb (75 kg; 11.8 st)
- Spouse: Rachel Flesch
- Children: 2

Career
- Sport: Golf
- College: University of Kentucky
- Turned professional: 1990
- Current tour: PGA Tour Champions
- Former tours: PGA Tour; Asia Golf Circuit; Hooters Jordan Tour
- Professional wins: 13
- Highest ranking: 22 (June 27, 2004)

Number of wins by tour
- PGA Tour: 4
- Korn Ferry Tour: 1
- PGA Tour Champions: 4
- Other: 4

Best results in major championships
- Masters Tournament: T5: 2008
- PGA Championship: 6th: 2008
- U.S. Open: T7: 2004
- The Open Championship: T20: 2000

Achievements and awards
- PGA Tour Rookie of the Year: 1998

Stephen J. Flesch (born May 23, 1967) is an American professional golfer who currently plays on the PGA Tour Champions. He was a four-time winner on the PGA Tour, and worked briefly as a TV golf analyst for Fox Sports and Golf Channel before joining the PGA Tour Champions.

== Early life ==
Flesch was born in Cincinnati, Ohio, and attended Covington Catholic High School in Park Hills, Kentucky. After graduation, he played golf at the University of Kentucky and turned professional in 1990.

== Professional career ==
Flesch finished in the top ten on the Asia Golf Circuit Order of Merit in 1993, 1994 and 1996. He won the 1997 NIKE Tour Championship to earn a PGA Tour card for the following season, only the second left-hander to win on what is now the Korn Ferry Tour. His first win on the PGA Tour was the 2003 HP Classic of New Orleans, but is probably best known for his come-from-behind victory at the 2004 Bank of America Colonial in Fort Worth, Texas. He has been featured in the top 50 of the Official World Golf Rankings, reaching a career high of 22nd in 2004.

Entering the 2008 Masters Tournament, Flesch was ranked number 107 in the world rankings. After three rounds, he was in third place at eight-under, three strokes behind leader and eventual champion Trevor Immelman. Playing in the penultimate pairing on breezy Sunday, Flesch posted a 78 to finish six strokes back, tied for fifth. This strong showing in a major tournament strengthened his world ranking by 28 slots, improving it to number 79.

Flesch last played a full season in 2011, then missed the cut in the 12 events he played during the 2012 season. In 2015, he finished T7 at the Barracuda Championship, his first top ten in four years.

In 2015, Flesch became an analyst for Fox Sports. He also worked as an analyst for Golf Channel before returning to competition on the PGA Tour Champions in 2017.

== Professional wins (13) ==
=== PGA Tour wins (4) ===
No.	Date	Tournament	Winning score	Margin of victory	Runner(s)-up
1	May 4, 2003	HP Classic of New Orleans	−21 (67-70-65-65=267)	Playoff	(United States) Bob Estes
2	May 23, 2004	Bank of America Colonial	−11 (66-69-67-67=269)	1 stroke	(United States) Chad Campbell
3	Aug 5, 2007	Reno–Tahoe Open	−15 (63-69-69-72=273)	5 strokes	(United States) Kevin Stadler, (United States) Charles Warren
4	Sep 23, 2007	Turning Stone Resort Championship	−18 (66-65-66-73=270)	2 strokes	(United States) Michael Allen

PGA Tour playoff record (1–0)

No.	Year	Tournament	Opponent	Result
1	2003	HP Classic of New Orleans	(United States) Bob Estes	Won with birdie on first extra hole

=== Asia Golf Circuit wins (1) ===
No.	Date	Tournament	Winning score	Margin of victory	Runner-up
1	Jan 21, 1996	Benson & Hedges Malaysian Open	−6 (66-75-71-70=282)	Playoff	(Australia) Craig Jones

Asia Golf Circuit playoff record (1–1)

No.	Year	Tournament	Opponent(s)	Result
1	1993	Thai International Thailand Open	(Taiwan) Hsieh Chin-sheng, (Australia) Craig Mann	Mann won with birdie on second extra hole Flesch eliminated by par on first hole
2	1996	Benson & Hedges Malaysian Open	(Australia) Craig Jones	Won with par on second extra hole

=== Nike Tour wins (1) ===
Legend
Tour Championships (1)
Other Nike Tour (0)

No.	Date	Tournament	Winning score	Margin of victory	Runner-up
1	Oct 19, 1997	Nike Tour Championship	−10 (69-68-68-73=278)	4 strokes	(United States) Chris Smith

=== Hooters Jordan Tour wins (1) ===
No.	Date	Tournament	Winning score	Margin of victory	Runner-up
1	Jun 26, 1994	Collins Pro Classic	−12 (67-72-69-68=276)	1 stroke	(United States) Eric Johnson

=== Other wins (2) ===
- 1991 Kentucky Open
- 1993 Kentucky Open

=== PGA Tour Champions wins (4) ===
No.	Date	Tournament	Winning score	Margin of victory	Runner(s)-up
1	Apr 14, 2018	Mitsubishi Electric Classic	−11 (66-71-68=205)	Playoff	(Germany) Bernhard Langer, (United States) Scott Parel
2	May 8, 2022	Mitsubishi Electric Classic (2)	−11 (67-73-65=205)	1 stroke	(United States) Fred Couples, (Republic of Ireland) Pádraig Harrington, (United States) David Toms
3	Sep 25, 2022	PURE Insurance Championship	−11 (66-71-68=205)	1 stroke	(New Zealand) Steven Alker, (South Africa) Ernie Els, (United States) Paul Stankowski
4	Sep 10, 2023	Ascension Charity Classic	−19 (66-66-62=194)	3 strokes	(United States) Kevin Sutherland

PGA Tour Champions playoff record (1–1)

No.	Year	Tournament	Opponents	Result
1	2018	Mitsubishi Electric Classic	(Germany) Bernhard Langer, (United States) Scott Parel	Won with birdie on second extra hole Langer eliminated by birdie on first hole
2	2021	Sanford International	(South Korea) K. J. Choi, (Northern Ireland) Darren Clarke	Clarke won with birdie on second extra hole Flesch eliminated by par on first hole

== Results in major championships ==
Tournament	1993	1994	1995	1996	1997	1998	1999
Masters Tournament							
U.S. Open	84	CUT		CUT			CUT
The Open Championship							
PGA Championship						T13	T34

Tournament	2000	2001	2002	2003	2004	2005	2006	2007	2008	2009	2010
Masters Tournament		CUT			T17	T29			T5	T6	T38
U.S. Open		CUT	T18	CUT	T7	T67			CUT		
The Open Championship	T20	CUT		CUT	T54	77					
PGA Championship	CUT	T13	T17	CUT	T37	T10	T24	T23	6	T32	

Top 10
Did not play

CUT = missed the half-way cut
"T" = tied

=== Summary ===
Tournament	Wins	2nd	3rd	Top-5	Top-10	Top-25	Events	Cuts made
Masters Tournament	0	0	0	1	2	3	6	5
U.S. Open	0	0	0	0	1	2	10	4
The Open Championship	0	0	0	0	0	1	5	3
PGA Championship	0	0	0	0	2	7	12	10
Totals	0	0	0	1	5	13	33	22

- Most consecutive cuts made – 11 (2004 Masters – 2008 Masters)
- Longest streak of top-10s – 2 (2008 PGA – 2009 Masters)

== Results in The Players Championship ==
Tournament	1999	2000	2001	2002	2003	2004	2005	2006	2007	2008	2009	2010
The Players Championship	CUT	T38	T40	CUT	T39	CUT	T79	T63	CUT	CUT	T64	T32

CUT = missed the halfway cut
"T" indicates a tie for a place

== Results in World Golf Championships ==
Tournament	2000	2001	2002	2003	2004	2005	2006	2007	2008
Match Play		R64	R16		R32	R64			
Championship	T11	NT^{1}		T21	T23				
Invitational				T11	T48				T48

^{1}Cancelled due to 9/11

Top 10
Did not play

QF, R16, R32, R64 = Round in which player lost in match play
"T" = Tied
NT = No tournament

== See also ==
- 1997 Nike Tour graduates
