= 2020–21 PGA Tour Champions season =

Golf tour season

- Duration: January 16, 2020 – November 14, 2021
- Number of official events: 39 (Note: A further 15 tournaments were scheduled but were either canceled or postponed.)
- Most wins: (United States) Phil Mickelson (4)
- Charles Schwab Cup: (Germany) Bernhard Langer
- Money list: (Germany) Bernhard Langer
- Player of the Year: (Germany) Bernhard Langer
- Rookie of the Year: (United States) Jim Furyk

The 2020–21 PGA Tour Champions season was the 41st season of PGA Tour Champions (formerly the Senior PGA Tour and the Champions Tour), the main professional golf tour in the United States for men aged 50 and over.

== COVID-19 pandemic impact ==
The season was severely impacted by the COVID-19 pandemic, with half the scheduled tournaments being cancelled, including four of the five senior majors. As a result the only major played in 2020 was the Senior Players Championship, which was won by Jerry Kelly, who finished two strokes ahead Scott Parel to claim his first senior major title. The season was expanded to include all 2021 tournaments with the Charles Schwab Cup Playoffs events in 2020 returning to regular event status.

== Schedule ==
The following table shows the official schedule of events for the 2020–21 season.

Date	Tournament	Location	Purse (US$)	Winner (Note: The number in parentheses after each winner's name is the number of PGA Tour Champions events they had won up to and including that tournament. This information is only shown for PGA Tour Champions members.)	Notes
Jan 18, 2020	Mitsubishi Electric Championship at Hualalai	Hawaii	1,800,000	(Spain) Miguel Ángel Jiménez (9)	
Feb 1, 2020	Morocco Champions	Morocco	2,000,000	(United States) Brett Quigley (1)	New tournament
Feb 16, 2020	Chubb Classic	Florida	1,600,000	(United States) Scott Parel (3)	
Mar 1, 2020	Cologuard Classic	Arizona	1,700,000	(Germany) Bernhard Langer (41)	
Mar 8, 2020	Hoag Classic	California	1,800,000	(South Africa) Ernie Els (1)	
~~Mar 29, 2020~~	Rapiscan Systems Classic	Mississippi	–	Canceled	
~~Apr 19, 2020~~	Mitsubishi Electric Classic	Georgia	–	Canceled	
~~May 3, 2020~~	Insperity Invitational	Texas	–	Canceled	
~~May 24, 2020~~	KitchenAid Senior PGA Championship	Michigan	–	Canceled	Senior major championship
~~Jun 7, 2020~~	American Family Insurance Championship	Wisconsin	–	Canceled	
~~Jun 14, 2020~~	MasterCard Japan Championship	Japan	–	Canceled	
~~Jun 28, 2020~~	U.S. Senior Open	Rhode Island	–	Canceled	Senior major championship
~~Jul 26, 2020~~	The Senior Open Championship	England	–	Canceled	Senior major championship
Aug 2, 2020	The Ally Challenge	Michigan	2,000,000	(United States) Jim Furyk (1)	
~~Aug 16, 2020~~	Dick's Sporting Goods Open	New York	–	Canceled	
Aug 16; ~~Jul 12, 2020~~	Bridgestone Senior Players Championship	Ohio	2,800,000	(United States) Jerry Kelly (7)	PGA Tour Champions major championship
Aug 21, 2020	Charles Schwab Series at Bass Pro Shops Big Cedar Lodge	Missouri	3,000,000	(United States) Shane Bertsch (1)	New tournament
~~Aug 23, 2020~~	Boeing Classic	Washington	–	Canceled	
Aug 26, 2020	Charles Schwab Series at Ozarks National	Missouri	3,000,000	(United States) Phil Mickelson (1)	New tournament
~~Aug 30, 2020~~	Shaw Charity Classic	Canada	–	Canceled	
~~Sep 6, 2020~~; ~~May 31, 2020~~	Principal Charity Classic	Iowa	–	Canceled	
Sep 13, 2020	Sanford International	South Dakota	1,800,000	(Spain) Miguel Ángel Jiménez (10)	
Sep 20, 2020	PURE Insurance Championship	California	2,200,000	(United States) Jim Furyk (2)	
~~Sep 27, 2020~~; ~~May 10, 2020~~	Regions Tradition	Alabama	–	Canceled	PGA Tour Champions major championship
~~Oct 4, 2020~~	Ascension Charity Classic	Missouri	–	Canceled	
Oct 11, 2020	SAS Championship	North Carolina	2,100,000	(South Africa) Ernie Els (2)	
Oct 18, 2020	Dominion Energy Charity Classic	Virginia	2,000,000	(United States) Phil Mickelson (2)	
Nov 1, 2020	TimberTech Championship	Florida	2,000,000	(Northern Ireland) Darren Clarke (1)	
Nov 8, 2020	Charles Schwab Cup Championship	Arizona	2,500,000	(United States) Kevin Sutherland (4)	
Jan 23, 2021	Mitsubishi Electric Championship at Hualalai	Hawaii	1,800,000	(Northern Ireland) Darren Clarke (2)	
Feb 28, 2021	Cologuard Classic	Arizona	1,700,000	(United States) Kevin Sutherland (5)	
~~Mar 7, 2021~~	Hoag Classic	California	–	Postponed	
Apr 18, 2021	Chubb Classic	Florida	1,600,000	(United States) Steve Stricker (6)	
May 2, 2021	Insperity Invitational	Texas	1,250,000	(Canada) Mike Weir (1)	
May 9, 2021	Regions Tradition	Alabama	2,750,000	(Germany) Alex Čejka (1)	PGA Tour Champions major championship
May 16, 2021	Mitsubishi Electric Classic	Georgia	1,800,000	(United States) Dicky Pride (1)	
May 30, 2021	KitchenAid Senior PGA Championship	Oklahoma	3,500,000	(Germany) Alex Čejka (2)	Senior major championship
Jun 6, 2021	Principal Charity Classic	Iowa	1,850,000	(Canada) Stephen Ames (2)	
Jun 13, 2021	American Family Insurance Championship	Wisconsin	2,400,000	(United States) Jerry Kelly (8)	
Jun 27, 2021	Bridgestone Senior Players Championship	Ohio	3,000,000	(United States) Steve Stricker (7)	PGA Tour Champions major championship
Jul 4, 2021	Dick's Sporting Goods Open	New York	2,050,000	(United States) Cameron Beckman (1)	
Jul 11, 2021	U.S. Senior Open	Nebraska	4,000,000	(United States) Jim Furyk (3)	Senior major championship
Jul 25, 2021	The Senior Open Championship	England	2,500,000	(Wales) Stephen Dodd (1)	Senior major championship
Aug 15, 2021	Shaw Charity Classic	Canada	2,350,000	(United States) Doug Barron (2)	
Aug 22, 2021	Boeing Classic	Washington	2,100,000	(Australia) Rod Pampling (1)	
Aug 29, 2021	The Ally Challenge	Michigan	2,000,000	(United States) Joe Durant (4)	
Sep 12, 2021	Ascension Charity Classic	Missouri	2,000,000	(United States) David Toms (2)	
Sep 19, 2021	Sanford International	South Dakota	1,800,000	(Northern Ireland) Darren Clarke (3)	
Sep 26, 2021	PURE Insurance Championship	California	2,200,000	(South Korea) K. J. Choi (1)	
Oct 10, 2021	Constellation Furyk and Friends	Florida	2,000,000	(United States) Phil Mickelson (3)	New tournament
Oct 17, 2021	SAS Championship	North Carolina	2,100,000	(United States) Lee Janzen (2)	
Oct 24, 2021	Dominion Energy Charity Classic	Virginia	2,000,000	(Germany) Bernhard Langer (42)	Charles Schwab Cup playoff event
Nov 7, 2021	TimberTech Championship	Florida	2,000,000	(New Zealand) Steven Alker (1)	Charles Schwab Cup playoff event
Nov 14, 2021	Charles Schwab Cup Championship	Arizona	2,500,000	(United States) Phil Mickelson (4)	Charles Schwab Cup playoff event

=== Unofficial events ===
The following events were sanctioned by PGA Tour Champions, but did not carry official money, nor were wins official.

Date	Tournament	Location	Purse ($)	Winners	Notes
Dec 20, 2020	PNC Championship	Florida	1,085,000	(United States) Justin Thomas and father Mike Thomas	Team event
Dec 19, 2021	PNC Championship	Florida	1,085,000	(United States) John Daly and son John Daly II	Team event

== Charles Schwab Cup ==
The Charles Schwab Cup was based on tournament results during the season, calculated using a points-based system.

Position	Player	Points
1	(Germany) Bernhard Langer	3,655,999
2	(United States) Jim Furyk	3,499,522
3	(Spain) Miguel Ángel Jiménez	3,051,298
4	(South Africa) Ernie Els	2,960,445
5	(United States) Jerry Kelly	2,619,201

== Money list ==
The money list was based on prize money won during the season, calculated in U.S. dollars.

Position	Player	Prize money ($)
1	(Germany) Bernhard Langer	3,255,499
2	(United States) Jim Furyk	3,141,663
3	(Spain) Miguel Ángel Jiménez	2,800,098
4	(South Africa) Ernie Els	2,719,445
5	(United States) Jerry Kelly	2,588,101

== Awards ==
Award	Winner	Ref.
Player of the Year (Jack Nicklaus Trophy)	(Germany) Bernhard Langer	
Rookie of the Year	(United States) Jim Furyk	
Scoring leader (Byron Nelson Award)	(United States) Jim Furyk	
