= Bart Bryant =

American professional golfer (1962–2022)

Personal information
- Full name: Barton Holan Bryant
- Nationality: United States
- Born: November 18, 1962 Gatesville, Texas, U.S.
- Died: May 31, 2022 (aged 59) Polk City, Florida, U.S.
- Height: 6 ft 0 in (1.83 m)
- Weight: 195 lb (88 kg; 13.9 st)
- Spouses: Cathy Cox (m. 1983; died 2017) Donna Bryant (m. 2018)
- Children: 2

Career
- Sport: Golf
- College: New Mexico State University
- Turned professional: 1986
- Former tours: PGA Tour; PGA Tour Champions
- Professional wins: 8
- Highest ranking: 22 (November 27, 2005)

Number of wins by tour
- PGA Tour: 3
- PGA Tour Champions: 2
- Other: 3

Best results in major championships
- Masters Tournament: CUT: 2006, 2007
- PGA Championship: T32: 2007
- U.S. Open: T29: 2008
- The Open Championship: T23: 2005

Barton Holan Bryant (November 18, 1962 – May 31, 2022) was an American professional golfer who played on the PGA Tour and PGA Tour Champions.

== Early life ==
Bryant was born in Gatesville, Texas, the son of a Baptist pastor. He attended New Mexico State University, where he was a two-time All-American as a member of the golf team.

== Professional career ==
In 1986, Bryant turned professional. Bryant did not win on the PGA Tour until his 187th start, the 2004 Valero Texas Open. His entire career was plagued by injuries and he graduated from PGA Tour Q School six times before his win. At 41 he was the oldest first time winner on the tour in nine years. In 2005 he won the Memorial Tournament and the season ending Tour Championship to finish ninth on the money list with earnings of $3,249,136, which was more than he had earned in total in his first eighteen seasons on the PGA and Nationwide tours from 1986 to 2003, during which his best money list finish on the main tour was 80th. His good run of form also propelled him into the top-50 of the Official World Golf Ranking.

The win at Memorial was particularly memorable. Bryant's tee shot on the 72nd hole found a hazard. He was able to get it up and down for par and secure his one-shot victory over Fred Couples.

Bryant's elder brother Brad has won on both the PGA Tour and the Champions Tour.

Bryant won his first Champions Tour event at the 2013 Dick's Sporting Goods Open, making him the 1,000th winner in Champions Tour history.

== Personal life ==
Bryant was married to the former Cathy Cox for 34 years until she died of brain cancer in April 2017. They had two children. He re-married shortly thereafter to Donna.

Bryant died on May 31, 2022, after a truck hit his car in Polk City, Florida, at the age of 59.

== Professional wins (9) ==
=== PGA Tour wins (3) ===
Legend
Tour Championships (1)
Other PGA Tour (2)

No.	Date	Tournament	Winning score	Margin of victory	Runner-up
1	Sep 19, 2004	Valero Texas Open	−19 (67-67-60-67=261)	3 strokes	(United States) Patrick Sheehan
2	Jun 5, 2005	Memorial Tournament	−16 (69-69-66-68=272)	1 stroke	(United States) Fred Couples
3	Nov 6, 2005	The Tour Championship	−17 (62-68-66-67=263)	6 strokes	(United States) Tiger Woods

=== Other wins (3) ===
- 1988 Florida Open
- 1990 North Dakota Open
- 1994 Florida Open

=== PGA Tour Champions wins (2) ===
No.	Date	Tournament	Winning score	Margin of victory	Runner(s)-up
1	Aug 18, 2013	Dick's Sporting Goods Open	−16 (66-62-72=200)	1 stroke	(United States) Russ Cochran, (United States) Corey Pavin
2	Aug 19, 2018	Dick's Sporting Goods Open (2)	−16 (68-67-65=200)	1 stroke	(United States) Michael Bradley

PGA Tour Champions playoff record (0–2)

No.	Year	Tournament	Opponent	Result
1	2015	ACE Group Classic	(United States) Lee Janzen	Lost to par on first extra hole
2	2016	Toshiba Classic	(United States) Jay Haas	Lost to birdie on first extra hole

=== Other senior wins (1) ===
- 2013 Liberty Mutual Insurance Legends of Golf - Raphael Division (with Ian Baker-Finch)

== Results in major championships ==
Tournament	1987	1988	1989	1990	1991	1992	1993	1994	1995	1996	1997	1998	1999
Masters Tournament													
U.S. Open	CUT							CUT					
The Open Championship													
PGA Championship													

Tournament	2000	2001	2002	2003	2004	2005	2006	2007	2008
Masters Tournament							CUT	CUT	
U.S. Open						CUT	T32		T29
The Open Championship						T23	70		T39
PGA Championship						CUT	CUT	T32	CUT

Did not play

CUT = missed the half-way cut
"T" = tied

== Results in The Players Championship ==
Tournament	1991	1992	1993	1994	1995	1996	1997	1998	1999
The Players Championship	CUT	CUT							

Tournament	2000	2001	2002	2003	2004	2005	2006	2007	2008	2009
The Players Championship						CUT	T56	CUT	T42	CUT

Did not play

CUT = missed the halfway cut
"T" indicates a tie for a place

== Results in World Golf Championships ==
Tournament	2005	2006	2007
Match Play		R64	
Championship	T56	T26	T35
Invitational	T28	T62	

Did not play

QF, R16, R32, R64 = Round in which player lost in match play
"T" = Tied

== See also ==
- 1990 PGA Tour Qualifying School graduates
- 1994 PGA Tour Qualifying School graduates
- 1995 PGA Tour Qualifying School graduates
- 1999 PGA Tour Qualifying School graduates
- 2000 PGA Tour Qualifying School graduates
- 2002 PGA Tour Qualifying School graduates
