= Joe Durant =

American professional golfer (born 1964)

Personal information
- Full name: Joseph Scott Durant
- Nationality: United States
- Born: April 7, 1964 (age 62) Pensacola, Florida, U.S.
- Height: 5 ft 10 in (1.78 m)
- Weight: 170 lb (77 kg; 12 st)

Career
- Sport: Golf
- College: Huntingdon College
- Turned professional: 1987
- Current tour: PGA Tour Champions
- Former tours: PGA Tour; Web.com Tour; T. C. Jordan Tour
- Professional wins: 13
- Highest ranking: 27 (February 4, 2007)

Number of wins by tour
- PGA Tour: 4
- Korn Ferry Tour: 1
- PGA Tour Champions: 5
- Other: 3

Best results in major championships
- Masters Tournament: CUT: 1999, 2001, 2002, 2007
- PGA Championship: T18: 2007
- U.S. Open: T24: 2001
- The Open Championship: T59: 2002

Achievements and awards
- PGA Tour Comeback Player of the Year: 2001

Joseph Scott Durant (born April 7, 1964) is an American professional golfer who plays on the PGA Tour Champions. He was previously a member of the PGA Tour, where he was a four-time winner.

== Early life ==
Durant was born in Pensacola, Florida. He attended Huntingdon College in Montgomery, Alabama, where he majored in Marketing and graduated in 1987. At Huntingdon, he was a three-time NAIA All-American and won the 1987 NAIA Championship.

== Professional career ==
In 1987, Durant turned professional. He has won four times on the PGA Tour. Durant won the 2001 Bob Hope Chrysler Classic with a score of 324 (-36), setting the tournament record which stands today. He has featured in the top 50 of the Official World Golf Ranking. His best finish in a major is T18 at the 2007 PGA Championship. In 2007 and 2008, he finished No. 129 on the PGA Tour official money list, and began playing some on the Nationwide Tour. By 2009, he was down to No. 131 and lost his PGA Tour card; however, he rebounded in 2010 to finish No. 115 on the money list to earn a spot on the Tour for 2011.

Durant began playing on the Champions Tour after turning 50 in April 2014.

== Professional wins (13) ==
=== PGA Tour wins (4) ===
No.	Date	Tournament	Winning score	Margin of victory	Runner(s)-up
1	Jun 28, 1998	Motorola Western Open	−17 (68-67-70-66=271)	2 strokes	(Fiji) Vijay Singh
2	Feb 18, 2001	Bob Hope Chrysler Classic	−36 (65-61-67-66-65=324)	4 strokes	(United States) Paul Stankowski
3	Mar 4, 2001	Genuity Championship	−18 (68-70-67-65=270)	2 strokes	(Canada) Mike Weir
4	Oct 22, 2006	Funai Classic at the Walt Disney World Resort	−25 (69-65-64-65=263)	4 strokes	(United States) Frank Lickliter, (United States) Troy Matteson

PGA Tour playoff record (0–1)

No.	Year	Tournament	Opponent	Result
1	2006	Southern Farm Bureau Classic	(United States) D. J. Trahan	Lost to birdie on third extra hole

=== Nike Tour wins (1) ===
No.	Date	Tournament	Winning score	Margin of victory	Runners-up
1	May 12, 1996	Nike Mississippi Gulf Coast Classic	−15 (67-71-65-70=273)	1 stroke	(United States) Brett Quigley, (United States) Dave Rummells

=== T. C. Jordan Tour wins (3) ===
No.	Date	Tournament	Winning score	Margin of victory	Runner(s)-up
1	May 10, 1992	Coca-Cola Classic	−15 (70-67-67-65=269)	Playoff	(United States) Craig Bowden, (United States) Kawika Cotner, (United States) Marion Dantzler
2	Jul 19, 1992	Baneberry Classic	−16 (70-69-65-68=272)	3 strokes	(United States) Eric Johnson, (United States) Jerry Kelly, (United States) Doug Weaver
3	Aug 9, 1992	WWAY Golf Classic	−17 (72-66-69-64=271)	2 strokes	(United States) Todd Barranger

=== PGA Tour Champions wins (5) ===
No.	Date	Tournament	Winning score	Margin of victory	Runner(s)-up
1	Apr 26, 2015	Big Cedar Lodge Legends of Golf (with (United States) Billy Andrade)	−19 (63-51-45=159)	3 strokes	(Scotland) Sandy Lyle and (Wales) Ian Woosnam
2	Aug 7, 2016	3M Championship	−19 (70-64-63=197)	Playoff	(Spain) Miguel Ángel Jiménez
3	Feb 18, 2018	Chubb Classic	−19 (67-63-67=197)	4 strokes	(United States) Steve Stricker, (United States) Billy Mayfair, (United States) David Toms, (United States) Tim Petrovic, (United States) Lee Janzen
4	Aug 29, 2021	The Ally Challenge	−17 (65-66-68=199)	1 stroke	(Germany) Bernhard Langer
5	Mar 10, 2024	Cologuard Classic	−13 (67-66-67=200)	2 strokes	(New Zealand) Steven Alker, (United States) Jerry Kelly, (United States) Kevin Sutherland

PGA Tour Champions playoff record (1–0)

No.	Year	Tournament	Opponent	Result
1	2016	3M Championship	(Spain) Miguel Ángel Jiménez	Won with eagle on first extra hole

== Results in major championships ==
Tournament	1998	1999
Masters Tournament		CUT
U.S. Open	T32	CUT
The Open Championship	CUT	
PGA Championship	T40	

Tournament	2000	2001	2002	2003	2004	2005	2006	2007	2008	2009
Masters Tournament		CUT	CUT					CUT		
U.S. Open		T24	CUT	CUT				CUT		
The Open Championship		CUT	T59	CUT		CUT		CUT		
PGA Championship		T51	T60	T39	CUT	T72		T18		

Tournament	2010	2011	2012
Masters Tournament			
U.S. Open			CUT
The Open Championship			
PGA Championship			

Did not play

CUT = missed the half-way cut
"T" = tied

=== Summary ===
Tournament	Wins	2nd	3rd	Top-5	Top-10	Top-25	Events	Cuts made
Masters Tournament	0	0	0	0	0	0	4	0
U.S. Open	0	0	0	0	0	1	7	2
The Open Championship	0	0	0	0	0	0	6	1
PGA Championship	0	0	0	0	0	1	7	6
Totals	0	0	0	0	0	2	24	9

- Most consecutive cuts made – 2 (1998 U.S. Open – 1998 PGA)
- Longest streak of top-10s – 0

== Results in The Players Championship ==
Tournament	1997	1998	1999	2000	2001	2002	2003	2004	2005	2006	2007	2008	2009	2010	2011
The Players Championship	CUT	CUT	76		T10	CUT	T62	T58	5	T36	T28				CUT

Top 10
Did not play

CUT = missed the halfway cut
"T" indicates a tie for a place

== Results in World Golf Championships ==
Tournament	2002	2003	2004	2005	2006	2007
Match Play	R64					R64
Championship						T65
Invitational						T14

Did not play

QF, R16, R32, R64 = Round in which player lost in match play
"T" = Tied

== Results in senior major championships ==
Results not in chronological order

Tournament	2014	2015	2016	2017	2018	2019	2020	2021	2022	2023	2024	2025	2026
Senior PGA Championship	T5	T13	CUT	T46	T15	CUT	NT	T30	T55	CUT	T29	T61	CUT
The Tradition	T9	T13		T57	T2	T30	NT	T35	T21	T18	T39	WD	T65
U.S. Senior Open	T9	CUT	T14	T12	T44	T24	NT	CUT	CUT	T12	CUT	CUT	CUT
Senior Players Championship	T6	T3	T2	T6	T61	T34	T14	T16	T35	T25	T49	T55	T67
Senior British Open Championship		T34	T7	WD	T43	T46	NT				CUT	T51	T70

Top 10
Did not play

CUT = missed the halfway cut
"T" indicates a tie for a place
WD = withdrew
NT = no tournament due to COVID-19 pandemic

== See also ==
- 1992 PGA Tour Qualifying School graduates
- 1996 Nike Tour graduates
- 2013 Web.com Tour Finals graduates
