= Steve Stricker =

American professional golfer (born 1967)

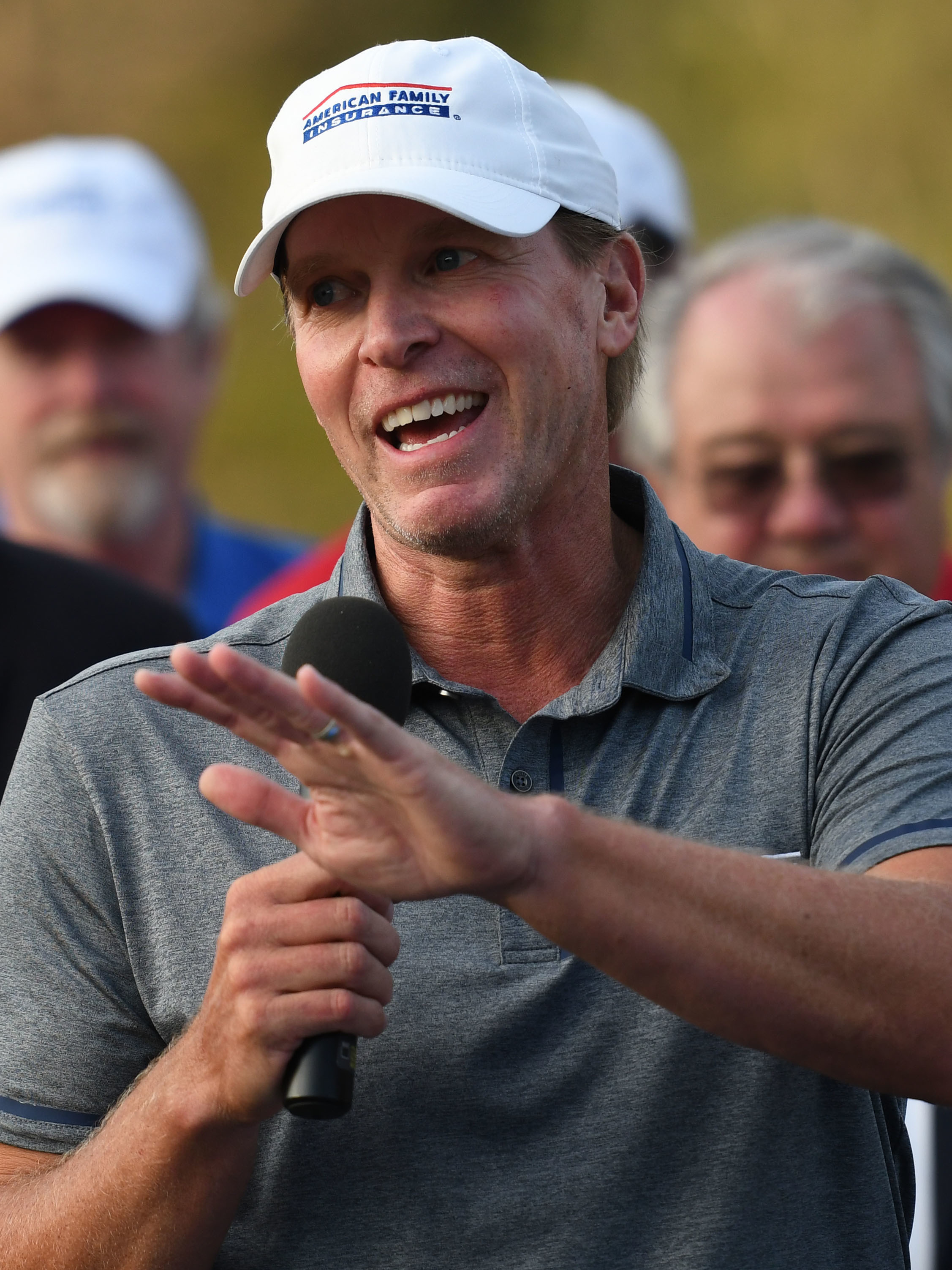
- Stricker in 2018

Personal information
- Full name: Steven Charles Stricker
- Nicknames: Mr. September, Strick
- Nationality: United States
- Born: February 23, 1967 (age 59) Edgerton, Wisconsin, U.S.
- Height: 6 ft 0 in (1.83 m)
- Weight: 190 lb (86 kg; 14 st)
- Spouse: Nicki Tiziani (m. 1993)
- Children: 2

Career
- Sport: Golf
- College: University of Illinois
- Turned professional: 1990
- Current tours: PGA Tour; PGA Tour Champions
- Former tour: Canadian Tour
- Professional wins: 41
- Highest ranking: 2 (September 6, 2009)

Number of wins by tour
- PGA Tour: 12
- European Tour: 1
- PGA Tour Champions: 18
- European Senior Tour: 2
- Other: 11

Best results in major championships
- Masters Tournament: T6: 2009
- PGA Championship: 2nd: 1998
- U.S. Open: 5th/T5: 1998, 1999
- The Open Championship: 4th: 2016

Achievements and awards
- PGA Tour Comeback Player of the Year: 2006, 2007
- Payne Stewart Award: 2012
- Byron Nelson Award: 2013
- PGA Tour Champions Charles Schwab Cup winner: 2023
- PGA Tour Champions money list winner: 2023
- PGA Tour Champions Player of the Year: 2023
- PGA Tour Champions Byron Nelson Award: 2023

Steven Charles Stricker (born February 23, 1967) is an American professional golfer who plays on the PGA Tour and the PGA Tour Champions. He has twelve victories on the PGA Tour, including the WGC-Match Play title in 2001 and two FedEx Cup playoff events. His most successful season on tour came at age 42 in 2009, with three victories and a runner-up finish on the money list. Stricker spent over 250 weeks in the top-10 of the Official World Golf Ranking, reaching a career-high world ranking of No. 2 in September 2009. Stricker served as U.S. Ryder Cup captain for the 2021 matches, winning at Whistling Straits in his home state of Wisconsin.

== Early life and amateur career ==
In 1967, Stricker was born in Edgerton, Wisconsin. He grew up playing golf at Lake Ripley Country Club in nearby Cambridge and Edgerton Towne Country Club in Edgerton.

A 1990 graduate of the University of Illinois, Stricker earned All-American honors as a member of the Illini golf team in 1988 and 1989.

== Professional career ==
In 1990, Stricker turned professional. He began his career on the Canadian Professional Golf Tour, where he won two tournaments. He joined the PGA Tour in 1994. His first success at the top level came in 1996 when Stricker notched two victories: the Kemper Open and the Motorola Western Open. He recorded seven top-ten finishes in total to finish fourth on the 1996 PGA Tour money list.

In 1998, Stricker played himself into contention in the final round of the PGA Championship at Sahalee Country Club near Seattle. PGA Tour veteran Vijay Singh bested Stricker down the stretch thanks to a back-nine surge and claimed a two-stroke victory. This runner-up finish remains Stricker's best result in a major championship to date. Stricker has finished inside the top-20 six times at the U.S. Open, with his best finish a fifth-place in 1999 at Pinehurst No. 2. He won his third and most prestigious PGA Tour title at the WGC Match Play Championship in 2001, where he defeated Pierre Fulke 2 and 1 in Australia to earn the $1,000,000 prize. This remains as the only time that the WGC Match Play Championship was played outside of the United States.

Stricker lost his tour card in 2004. At age 39 in 2006, relying on sponsor exemptions, he managed seven top-ten finishes and was voted the tour's Comeback Player of the Year. In 2007 he won his fourth PGA Tour title at The Barclays on August 26, ending an 11-year victory drought on American soil, although he had previously triumphed down in Australia in 2001. This run of success earned him a spot on the Presidents Cup team in 2007.

After his victory at The Barclays, which was the first of the four FedEx Cup playoff events, Stricker reached No. 4 in the Official World Golf Ranking, his highest career ranking at that point. Stricker finished runner-up in the 2007 FedEx Cup Playoffs behind Tiger Woods, and was again selected as Comeback Player of the Year. He was also inducted into the Wisconsin State Golf Association Hall of Fame in 2007.

At the Mercedes Benz Championship, the opening event of the 2008 season, Stricker lost out in a play-off to Daniel Chopra. This result took Stricker to No. 3 in the Official World Golf Ranking, again at the time his highest ranking to date.

At the Bob Hope Classic in January 2009, Stricker shot third and fourth round scores of 61 and 62 at the PGA West Palmer and Nicklaus courses to set the 36-hole scoring record on the PGA Tour at 123, beating a record that Pat Perez had held for only two days. (This record fell in October when Troy Matteson shot 61-61=122 at the Frys.com Open.) His four-round total of 33-under-par in the five-round event also set the PGA Tour record for lowest score relative to par for 72 holes, exceeding Ernie Els' total of 31 under par in the 2003 Mercedes-Benz Championship at Kapalua. The third-round 61 was Stricker's best score on tour to that point, but a 77 in the final round dropped him into a tie for third.

Stricker won his fifth PGA Tour title at Colonial in Texas at the end of May 2009, with a playoff win over Tim Clark and Steve Marino. The win was aided by a 60-foot (18 m) chip-in on the 71st hole. He won again in July at the John Deere Classic in Silvis, Illinois. After the second round was rained-out on Friday, the field was forced to play 36 holes on Sunday. Stricker shot an afternoon round of 64, which included a hole-out wedge shot for eagle on the 6th hole, and by three strokes over runners-up Zach Johnson, Brandt Snedeker, and Brett Quigley. He also matched his career low round on tour with a second round of 61 (−10).

Stricker's third win of 2009, and seventh overall, came in September at the Deutsche Bank Championship, the second of four playoff events. He began the final round tied with Retief Goosen and Sean O'Hair, and birdied the final hole to win by one stroke over Jason Dufner and Scott Verplank. It was Stricker's second FedEx Cup playoff win, a win that also vaulted him ahead of Tiger Woods to the top of the FedEx Cup standings and vaulted him to No. 2 in the Official World Golf Ranking, his highest ranking achieved during his career. Stricker has been called "Mr. September" due to his success in the FedEx Cup playoffs, where he has never finished outside the top-25 in his first ten career starts.

In February 2010, Stricker won his eighth tour title at the Northern Trust Open with a 16-under-par 268 winning total. With this win at Riviera, he passed Phil Mickelson and regained his ranking as World No. 2.

In July, Stricker shot a career-low 60 (−11) in the first round of the John Deere Classic. However, a 59 shot by Paul Goydos incredibly put him one stroke back of the lead. He followed with rounds of 66 and 62, for a total of 188, to set a tour 54-hole scoring record. He then shot 70 on Sunday to win his ninth PGA Tour, two strokes ahead of Goydos.

In June 2011, Stricker won at the Memorial Tournament in Ohio, his tenth tour title. He opened with 68 and bettered this with 67 in the second round. However, this was made special by the hole-in-one he recorded at the par three 8th hole to hold a three stroke advantage at the halfway stage. Remarkably, he then opened round three with two eagles in the first five holes to open up a six-shot lead midway through round three, but some uncharacteristic mistakes on the back nine saw him fall back towards the rest of the field. He held on to the 36-hole lead to eventually win by one stroke over runners-up Matt Kuchar and Brandt Jobe. With this victory, Stricker became the highest-ranked American in the Official World Golf Ranking, at fourth in the world. For the first time in his career, 44-year-old Stricker was ranked higher than all other American golfers, including Tiger Woods and Phil Mickelson. Stricker played the tournament at −20 for the front nine, a record by 6 shots, versus +4 for the back nine.

In July, Stricker gained his eleventh tour win at the John Deere Classic, sinking a 30-foot (9 m) birdie putt at the 72nd hole, one stroke ahead of runner-up Kyle Stanley. Stricker bogeyed the 15th and 16th to fall two strokes behind Stanley in a commanding position throughout most of Sunday's round. He then bounced back with a birdie on the par five 17th while Stanley made bogeyed the 18th. Stricker, tied for the lead at this point, drove into a fairway bunker off the tee and then played his second shot just over the back of the green, but holed the putt from the fringe for the victory. This was Stricker's third straight victory at the John Deere Classic becoming just the 10th golfer since World War II to win a tournament three straight times.

Stricker tied a major championship record with a 63 in the first round at the PGA Championship in 2011 and led by two shots. His next three days were 74-69-73, and he tied for twelfth. Stricker's career earnings are over $44 million through the end of the 2018–19 season, among the highest of those without a major title.

Stricker started the 2012 season with a win in the season-opening Tournament of Champions at Kapalua on Maui. He shot a ten-under 63 on day two and held the lead until the end, three strokes ahead of runner-up Martin Laird. It was his twelfth PGA Tour title. He missed the cut in May at The Players Championship, his first since the 2009 PGA Championship. It ended a streak of 49 consecutive cuts, which was the longest on tour.

At the start of the 2013 season, Stricker announced he would cut his schedule "in half," hoping to play just "10 or 12" tournaments. As the defending champion, he finished runner-up at the Hyundai Tournament of Champions despite suffering from a herniated disc. He then reached the quarterfinals at the WGC-Accenture Match Play Championship, his best performance since his victory in 2001.

=== Senior career ===
In 2017, Stricker joined the PGA Tour Champions. In his first event, the Tucson Conquistadores Classic, he finished one stroke behind Tom Lehman. Stricker asked the USGA for a special exemption to play in the 2017 U.S. Open held in his home state, but his request was denied. He eventually earned entry through a qualifying tournament in Memphis. Stricker was the captain of the victorious U.S. team in the 2017 Presidents Cup.

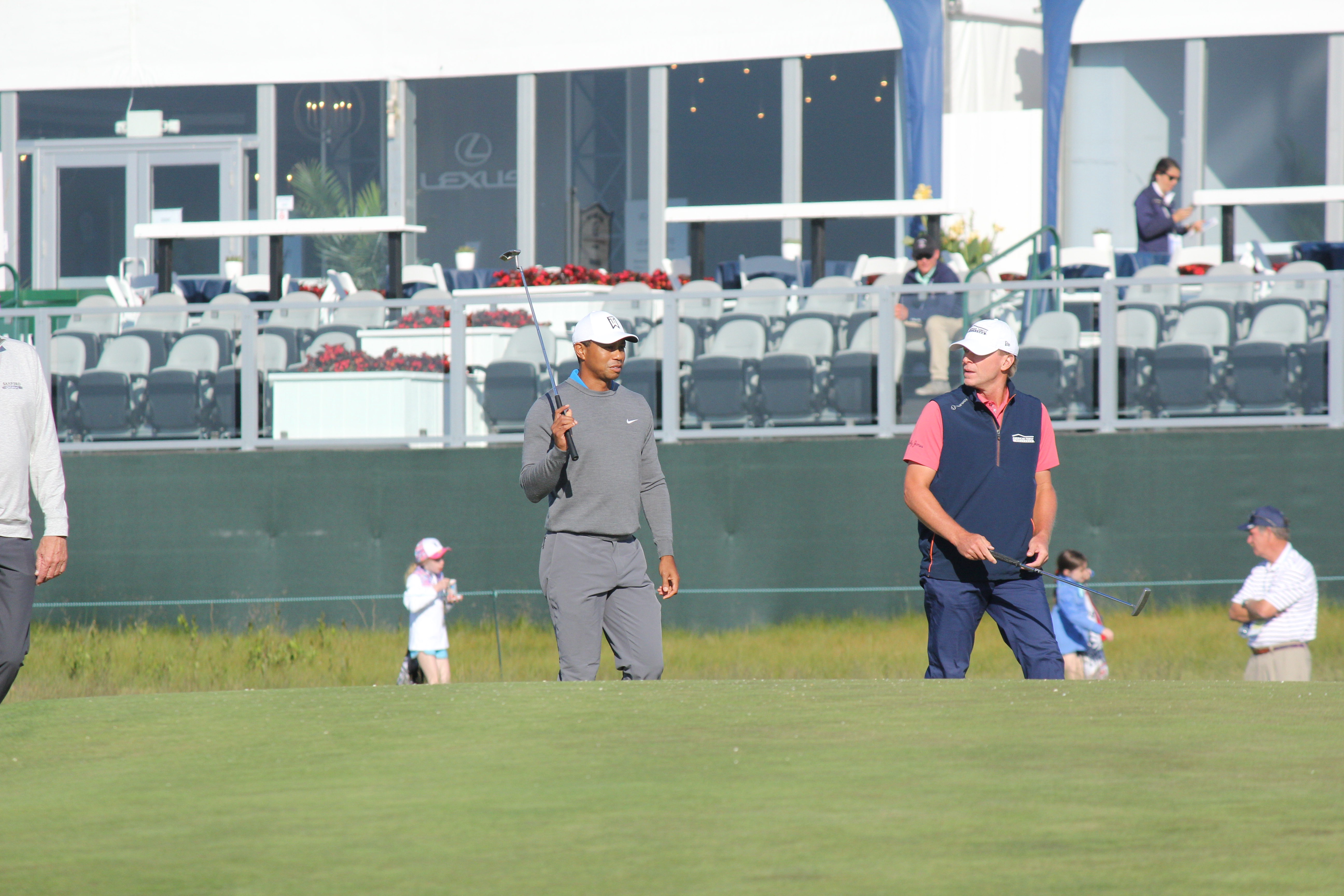
Stricker (right) playing a practice round with Tiger Woods at the 2018 U.S. Open.

In March 2018, Stricker won his first event on the PGA Tour Champions, the Cologuard Classic, by two strokes. He then won his second straight start at the Rapiscan Systems Classic in Saucier, Mississippi. In September 2018, he won the Sanford International tournament on the PGA Tour Champions.

In 2018, U.S. captain Jim Furyk named Stricker a non-playing vice-captain for the 2018 Ryder Cup team. The U.S. lost 17 1/2 to 10 1/2 to the European team.

In 2019, Stricker won his first senior major championship at the Regions Tradition, claiming a six-stroke win over the field. Then in June of the same year, Stricker won his second senior major at the U.S. Senior Open, again by six strokes over Jerry Kelly and David Toms.

In April 2021, Stricker won the Chubb Classic for his sixth win on the PGA Tour Champions.

In May 2021, Stricker came close to defending his title at the senior major, the Regions Tradition. Stricker birdied the last hole in regulation to force a playoff with Alex Čejka. Čejka won the playoff with a birdie on the first playoff hole.

In June 2021, Stricker won his third senior major at the Senior Players Championship at Firestone Country Club in Akron, Ohio. Stricker led by eight strokes going into the final round. He shot an even-par 70 in the final round and won by six strokes over Jerry Kelly.

In May 2022, Stricker won his fourth senior major title at the Regions Tradition in Birmingham, Alabama. Stricker shot a 4-under 68 in the final round for a 6-stroke victory. It was his first victory since he had to take a leave of absence for health reasons after the 2021 Ryder Cup.

In August 2022, Stricker won The Ally Challenge and in September 2022, he won the Sanford International in South Dakota in a playoff over Robert Karlsson. This brought him to 10 career PGA Tour Champions victories.

In October 2022, Stricker won the Constellation Furyk and Friends by two shots.

In January 2023, Stricker won the Mitsubishi Electric Championship at Hualalai on the Big Island of Hawaii by six strokes. In May 2023, Stricker won the Regions Tradition, his 13th PGA Champions Tour win, third Regions win, and fifth senior major. Two weeks later, Stricker won the KitchenAid Senior PGA Championship in a playoff over Pádraig Harrington. This marked his 14th PGA Champions Tour win and sixth senior major. In June 2023, Stricker won the American Family Insurance Championship in his home state of Wisconsin and he followed it in July with a third 2023 major victory at the Senior Players Championship. In September 2023, Stricker won the Sanford International in South Dakota for the third time. This marked his sixth title of the year on the Champions Tour and set a new record for most money earned in a single season at just shy of $4 million.

Stricker clinched the 2023 season-long Charles Schwab Cup with two weeks left in the season. His lead of more than two million points over Steven Alker meant that Alker could not catch him even if he won the last two tournaments of the year. This title comes with a $1 million annuity from Charles Schwab.

== Personal life ==
Stricker married into a golfing family. His father-in-law, Dennis Tiziani, and his brother-in-law, Mario Tiziani, played on the PGA Tour. He and his wife, Nicki, have two children. Nicki is often her husband's caddie.

At the opening ceremony of the 2021 Ryder Cup, while captaining the United States team, Stricker revealed that he was a supporter of the Chicago Bears despite being from Wisconsin, much to the chagrin of the present crowd, many of whom support the home-state Green Bay Packers; the two teams have one of the largest rivalries within the NFL. At the victory ceremony concluding the event, Dustin Johnson quipped to Stricker, "Next time, let's not tell all the Green Bay fans that you're a Bears fan."

== Professional wins (41) ==
=== PGA Tour wins (12) ===
Legend
World Golf Championships (1)
FedEx Cup playoff events (2)
Other PGA Tour (9)

No.	Date	Tournament	Winning score	To par	Margin of victory	Runner(s)-up
1	May 26, 1996	Kemper Open	69-68-65-68=270	−14	3 strokes	(United States) Brad Faxon, (United States) Scott Hoch, (United States) Mark O'Meara, (New Zealand) Grant Waite
2	Jul 7, 1996	Motorola Western Open	65-69-67-69=270	−18	8 strokes	(United States) Billy Andrade, (United States) Jay Don Blake
3	Jan 7, 2001	WGC-Accenture Match Play Championship	2 and 1			(Sweden) Pierre Fulke
4	Aug 26, 2007	The Barclays	67-67-65-69=268	−16	2 strokes	(South Korea) K. J. Choi
5	May 31, 2009	Crowne Plaza Invitational at Colonial	63-63-69-68=263	−17	Playoff	(South Africa) Tim Clark, (United States) Steve Marino
6	Jul 12, 2009	John Deere Classic	71-61-67-64=264	−20	3 strokes	(United States) Zach Johnson, (United States) Brett Quigley, (United States) Brandt Snedeker
7	Sep 7, 2009	Deutsche Bank Championship	63-72-65-67=267	−17	1 stroke	(United States) Jason Dufner, (United States) Scott Verplank
8	Feb 7, 2010	Northern Trust Open	67-65-66-70=268	−16	2 strokes	(England) Luke Donald
9	Jul 11, 2010	John Deere Classic (2)	60-66-62-70=258	−26	2 strokes	(United States) Paul Goydos
10	Jun 5, 2011	Memorial Tournament	68-67-69-68=272	−16	1 stroke	(United States) Brandt Jobe, (United States) Matt Kuchar
11	Jul 10, 2011	John Deere Classic (3)	66-64-63-69=262	−22	1 stroke	(United States) Kyle Stanley
12	Jan 9, 2012	Hyundai Tournament of Champions	68-63-69-69=269	−23	3 strokes	(Scotland) Martin Laird

PGA Tour playoff record (1–1)

No.	Year	Tournament	Opponent(s)	Result
1	2008	Mercedes-Benz Championship	(Sweden) Daniel Chopra	Lost to birdie on fourth extra hole
2	2009	Crowne Plaza Invitational at Colonial	(South Africa) Tim Clark, (United States) Steve Marino	Won with birdie on second extra hole

=== Canadian Tour wins (2) ===
No.	Date	Tournament	Winning score	To par	Margin of victory	Runner-up
1	Jun 3, 1990	Payless-Pepsi Victoria Open	66-68-70-72=276	−8	Playoff	(United States) Todd Hamilton
2	Aug 29, 1993	CPGA Championship	67-71-68-68=274	−10	5 strokes	(United States) John Restino

=== Other wins (9) ===
- 1987 Wisconsin State Open (as an amateur)
- 1990 Wisconsin State Open
- 1991 Wisconsin State Open
- 1998 Wisconsin State Open
- 2000 Wisconsin State Open
- 2009 The Shark Shootout (with Jerry Kelly)
- 2013 CVS Caremark Charity Classic (with Bo Van Pelt)
- 2014 CVS Caremark Charity Classic (with Bo Van Pelt)
- 2017 QBE Shootout (with Sean O'Hair)

=== PGA Tour Champions wins (18) ===
Legend
PGA Tour Champions major championships (7)
Other PGA Tour Champions (11)

No.	Date	Tournament	Winning score	To par	Margin of victory	Runner(s)-up
1	Mar 4, 2018	Cologuard Classic	66-70-69=205	−14	2 strokes	(United States) Scott Dunlap, (United States) Jerry Kelly, (United States) Gene Sauers
2	Mar 25, 2018	Rapiscan Systems Classic	68-69-68=205	−11	3 strokes	(United States) Billy Andrade
3	Sep 23, 2018	Sanford International	63-67-67=197	−13	4 strokes	(United States) Tim Petrovic, (United States) Jerry Smith
4	May 13, 2019	Regions Tradition	68-64-70-68=270	−18	6 strokes	(United States) Billy Andrade, (United States) Paul Goydos, (United States) David Toms
5	Jun 30, 2019	U.S. Senior Open	62-64-66-69=261	−19	6 strokes	(United States) Jerry Kelly, (United States) David Toms
6	Apr 19, 2021	Chubb Classic	66-67-67=200	−16	1 stroke	(Germany) Alex Čejka, (Sweden) Robert Karlsson
7	Jun 27, 2021	Bridgestone Senior Players Championship	63-68-72-70=273	−7	6 strokes	(United States) Jerry Kelly
8	May 15, 2022	Regions Tradition (2)	65-68-66-68=267	−21	6 strokes	(Republic of Ireland) Pádraig Harrington
9	Aug 28, 2022	The Ally Challenge	70-64-67=201	−15	1 stroke	(United States) Brett Quigley
10	Sep 18, 2022	Sanford International (2)	68-64-64=196	−14	Playoff	(Sweden) Robert Karlsson
11	Oct 9, 2022	Constellation Furyk and Friends	69-64-69=202	−14	1 stroke	(United States) Harrison Frazar
12	Jan 21, 2023	Mitsubishi Electric Championship at Hualalai	68-60-65=193	−23	6 strokes	(New Zealand) Steven Alker, (Northern Ireland) Darren Clarke, (United States) Ken Tanigawa, (Canada) Mike Weir
13	May 14, 2023	Regions Tradition (3)	68-68-64-65=265	−23	6 strokes	(South Africa) Ernie Els, (Sweden) Robert Karlsson
14	May 28, 2023	KitchenAid Senior PGA Championship	70-67-64-69=270	−18	Playoff	(Republic of Ireland) Pádraig Harrington
15	Jun 11, 2023	American Family Insurance Championship	65-64-69=198	−18	5 strokes	(New Zealand) Steven Alker, (England) Paul Broadhurst
16	Jul 16, 2023	Kaulig Companies Championship (2)	65-73-65-66=269	−11	3 strokes	(United States) David Toms
17	Sep 17, 2023	Sanford International (3)	62-66-66=194	−16	1 stroke	(South Korea) K. J. Choi
18	Sep 15, 2024	Sanford International (4)	67-68-67=202	−8	Playoff	(Australia) Richard Green

PGA Tour Champions playoff record (3–3)

No.	Year	Tournament	Opponent(s)	Result
1	2019	American Family Insurance Championship	(South Africa) Retief Goosen, (United States) Jerry Kelly	Kelly won with birdie on third extra hole
2	2021	Regions Tradition	(Germany) Alex Čejka	Lost to birdie on first extra hole
3	2022	Sanford International	(Sweden) Robert Karlsson	Won with birdie on first extra hole
4	2023	KitchenAid Senior PGA Championship	(Republic of Ireland) Pádraig Harrington	Won with par on first extra hole
5	2024	American Family Insurance Championship	(South Africa) Ernie Els	Lost to par on first extra hole
6	2024	Sanford International	(Australia) Richard Green	Won with birdie on fourth extra hole

== Results in major championships ==
Results not in chronological order in 2020.

Tournament	1993	1994	1995	1996	1997	1998	1999
Masters Tournament				CUT	CUT		T38
U.S. Open	83		T13	T60	T36	T5	5
The Open Championship				T22	T62	T52	CUT
PGA Championship			T23	T26	CUT	2	CUT

Tournament	2000	2001	2002	2003	2004	2005	2006	2007	2008	2009
Masters Tournament	T19	T10	CUT					CUT	CUT	T6
U.S. Open	T27	CUT	T16		CUT		T6	T13	T29	T23
The Open Championship	CUT	T42	T59					T8	T7	T52
PGA Championship	CUT	T66	CUT				T7	T23	T39	CUT

Tournament	2010	2011	2012	2013	2014	2015	2016	2017	2018
Masters Tournament	T30	T11	T47	T20	T31	T28		T16	
U.S. Open	T58	T19	T15	T8	T21			T16	T20
The Open Championship	T55	T12	T23				4	T37	
PGA Championship	T18	T12	T7	T12	T7	T30	T42	T54	

Tournament	2019	2020	2021
Masters Tournament			
PGA Championship	CUT	CUT	T44
U.S. Open		CUT	
The Open Championship		NT	

Top 10
Did not play

CUT = missed the half-way cut
"T" = tied
NT = No tournament due to COVID-19 pandemic

=== Summary ===
Tournament	Wins	2nd	3rd	Top-5	Top-10	Top-25	Events	Cuts made
Masters Tournament	0	0	0	0	2	6	16	11
PGA Championship	0	1	0	1	4	9	23	16
U.S. Open	0	0	0	2	4	13	22	19
The Open Championship	0	0	0	1	3	6	15	13
Totals	0	1	0	4	13	34	76	59

- Most consecutive cuts made – 27 (2010 Masters – 2018 US Open)
- Longest streak of top-10s – 2 (2006 U.S. Open – 2006 PGA)

== Results in The Players Championship ==
Tournament	1994	1995	1996	1997	1998	1999
The Players Championship	T23	T11	CUT	CUT	T51	T6

Tournament	2000	2001	2002	2003	2004	2005	2006	2007	2008	2009
The Players Championship	CUT	CUT	T19	CUT	CUT			T52	CUT	T22

Tournament	2010	2011	2012	2013	2014	2015	2016	2017	2018	2019
The Players Championship		T12	CUT	T37	T13	T38		T41	T23	

Tournament	2020	2021	2022	2023	2024
The Players Championship	C	CUT			CUT

Top 10
Did not play

CUT = missed the halfway cut
"T" indicates a tie for a place
C = Canceled after the first round due to the COVID-19 pandemic

== World Golf Championships ==
=== Wins (1) ===
Year	Championship	54 holes	Winning score	Margin	Runner-up
2001	WGC-Accenture Match Play Championship	n/a	2 and 1		(Sweden) Pierre Fulke

=== Results timeline ===
Tournament	1999	2000	2001	2002	2003	2004	2005	2006	2007	2008	2009	2010	2011	2012	2013	2014
Match Play	R64	R32	1	R64					R64	R16	R32	R64	R64	R16	QF	R64
Championship			NT^{1}						T35	T6	T13	T16	T18	T8	2	57
Invitational									T41	T43	T6	T9	14	T2	13	T63
Champions																

^{1}Cancelled due to 9/11

Win
Top 10
Did not play

QF, R16, R32, R64 = Round in which player lost in match play
"T" = tied
NT = No tournament
Note that the HSBC Champions did not become a WGC event until 2009.

== Senior major championships ==
=== Wins (7) ===
Year	Championship	54 holes	Winning score	Margin	Runner(s)-up
2019	Regions Tradition	4 shot lead	−18 (68-64-70-68=270)	6 strokes	(United States) Billy Andrade, (United States) Paul Goydos, (United States) David Toms
2019	U.S. Senior Open	6 shot lead	−19 (62-64-66-69=261)	6 strokes	(United States) Jerry Kelly, (United States) David Toms
2021	Bridgestone Senior Players Championship	3 shot lead	−7 (63-68-72-70=273)	6 strokes	(United States) Jerry Kelly
2022	Regions Tradition (2)	3 shot lead	−21 (65-68-66-68=267)	6 strokes	(Republic of Ireland) Pádraig Harrington
2023	Regions Tradition (3)	Tied	−23 (68-68-64-65=265)	6 strokes	(South Africa) Ernie Els, (Sweden) Robert Karlsson
2023	KitchenAid Senior PGA Championship	1 shot deficit	−18 (70-67-64-69=270)	Playoff	(Republic of Ireland) Pádraig Harrington
2023	Kaulig Companies Championship	Tied	−11 (65-73-65-66=269	3 strokes	(United States) David Toms

=== Results timeline ===
Results not in chronological order

Tournament	2017	2018	2019	2020	2021	2022	2023	2024	2025	2026
Senior PGA Championship			T41	NT	T11		1	8	T28	
The Tradition	T13	T2	1	NT	2	1	1	T3	T22	
U.S. Senior Open			1	NT		2	2	4		
Senior Players Championship			6	T23	1	2	1	T4		T50
The Senior Open Championship				NT						

Win
Top 10
Did not play

"T" indicates a tie for a place
NT = no tournament due to COVID-19 pandemic

== PGA Tour career summary ==
Season	Wins	Earnings ($)	Rank
1990	0	3,974	255
1991	0	0	n/a
1992	0	5,550	261
1993	0	46,171	186
1994	0	334,409	50
1995	0	438,931	40
1996	2	1,383,739	4
1997	0	167,652	130
1998	0	1,313,948	13
1999	0	662,461	64
2000	0	418,780	113
2001	1	1,676,229	30
2002	0	789,713	88
2003	0	150,590	188
2004	0	440,906	151
2005	0	397,640	162
2006	0	1,811,811	34
2007	1	4,663,077	4
2008	0	2,438,304	22
2009	3	6,332,636	2
2010	2	4,190,235	5
2011	2	3,992,785	8
2012	1	3,420,021	18
2013	0	4,440,532	7
2014	0	1,154,747	89
2015	0	269,701	180
2016	0	1,418,647	74
2017	0	1,002,036	102
2018	0	582,566	147
2019	0	135,670	215
2020	0	212,582	187
2021	0	640,311	157
Career*	12	44,936,354	17

* As of the 2021 season.

== PGA Tour Champions career summary ==
Season	Starts	Cuts made	Wins (majors)	2nd	3rd	Top-10	Top-25	Best finish	Earnings ($)	Money list rank
2017	6	6	0	1	3	5	6	2	569,250	37
2018	7	7	3	2	1	7	7	1	1,196,235	13
2019	9	9	2 (2)	1	0	6	7	1	1,534,327	8
2020–21**	13	13	2 (1)	1	2	11	13	1	1,747,438	13
2022	12	12	4 (1)	3	1	10	12	1	2,473,725	3
Career*	47	47	11 (4)	8	7	39	45	1	7,520,975	59

* As of end of 2022 season
** 2020 and 2021 seasons were combined due to the COVID-19 pandemic

== U.S. national team appearances ==
Professional

- Dunhill Cup: 1996 (winners)
- Presidents Cup: 1996 (winners), 2007 (winners), 2009 (winners), 2011 (winners), 2013 (winners), 2017 (non-playing captain, winners)
- Ryder Cup: 2008 (winners), 2010, 2012, 2021 (non-playing captain, winners)

== See also ==
- 1993 PGA Tour Qualifying School graduates
- List of golfers with most PGA Tour Champions wins
