= 1999 PGA Championship =

Coordinates: 41.966°N 88.048°W

Tournament information
- Dates: August 12–15, 1999
- Location: Medinah, Illinois
- Course(s): Medinah Country Club; Course No. 3
- Organized by: PGA of America
- Tour(s): PGA Tour; PGA European Tour; Japan Golf Tour

Statistics
- Par: 72
- Length: 7,401 yards (6,767 m)
- Field: 148 players, 74 after cut
- Cut: 146 (+2)
- Prize fund: $3,500,000 €3,028,228
- Winner's share: $630,000 €545,522

Champion
- (United States) Tiger Woods
- 277 (−11)

Location in the United States
Location in Illinois

The 1999 PGA Championship was the 81st PGA Championship, held August 12–15 at the Medinah Country Club in Medinah, Illinois, a suburb northwest of Chicago. Tiger Woods, 23, won his first PGA Championship and second major, one stroke ahead of runner-up Sergio García, age 19.

At the time, many (including noted commentator Gary McCord) predicted the start of a long rivalry between Woods and García. The teenage García's outgoing antics during the tournament had captured the attention of many golf fans, but his sole major title came over seventeen years later at the Masters in 2017. Mike Weir, the co-leader with Woods after 54 holes, shot 80 in the final round and tied for tenth.

Although this was the first PGA Championship at Medinah, it was the fourth major; the U.S. Open was held at Course No. 3 in 1949, 1975, and 1990. The PGA Championship returned seven years later in 2006, also won by Woods, and Medinah hosted the Ryder Cup in 2012.

== Course layout ==
Course No. 3

Hole	1	2	3	4	5	6	7	8	9	Out	10	11	12	13	14	15	16	17	18	In	Total
Yards	388	188	415	447	530	449	588	206	439	3,650	582	407	468	219	583	389	452	206	445	3,751	7,401
Par	4	3	4	4	5	4	5	3	4	36	5	4	4	3	5	4	4	3	4	36	72

Previous course lengths for major championships:

- 7,195 yards (6,579 m), par 72 - 1990 U.S. Open
- 7,032 yards (6,430 m), par 71 - 1975 U.S. Open
- 6,981 yards (6,383 m), par 71 - 1949 U.S. Open

== Round summaries ==
=== First round ===
Thursday, August 12, 1999

Place	Player	Score	To par
1	(Spain) Sergio García	66	−6
T2	(United States) Jay Haas	68	−4
T2	(United States) J. P. Hayes	68	−4
T2	(Canada) Mike Weir	68	−4
T5	(United States) Stewart Cink	69	−3
T5	(United States) Brandt Jobe	69	−3
T5	(United States) Jerry Kelly	69	−3
T5	(United States) Corey Pavin	69	−3
T5	(United States) Brian Watts	69	−3
T10	(United States) Mark Brooks	70	−2
T10	(United States) David Duval	70	−2
T10	(United States) Hale Irwin	70	−2
T10	(England) Mark James	70	−2
T10	(Spain) Miguel Ángel Jiménez	70	−2
T10	(Sweden) Robert Karlsson	70	−2
T10	(United States) Tom Lehman	70	−2
T10	(United States) Chris Perry	70	−2
T10	(Zimbabwe) Nick Price	70	−2
T10	(United States) Loren Roberts	70	−2
T10	(United States) Ted Tryba	70	−2
T10	(England) Lee Westwood	70	−2
T10	(United States) Tiger Woods	70	−2
T10	(United States) Bruce Zabriski	70	−2

=== Second round ===
Friday, August 13, 1999

Place	Player	Score	To par
1	(United States) Jay Haas	68-67=135	−9
2	(Canada) Mike Weir	68-68=136	−8
3	(United States) Tiger Woods	70-67=137	−7
4	(England) Lee Westwood	70-68=138	−6
T5	(United States) Stewart Cink	69-70=139	−5
T5	(Spain) Sergio García	66-73=139	−5
T5	(United States) Hale Irwin	70-69=139	−5
T5	(United States) Skip Kendall	74-65=139	−5
T9	(Spain) Miguel Ángel Jiménez	70-70=140	−4
T9	(United States) Brian Watts	69-71=140	−4

=== Third round ===
Saturday, August 14, 1999

Place	Player	Score	To par
T1	(Canada) Mike Weir	68-68-69=205	−11
T1	(United States) Tiger Woods	70-67-68=205	−11
T3	(United States) Stewart Cink	69-70-68=207	−9
T3	(Spain) Sergio García	66-73-68=207	−9
T5	(United States) Jim Furyk	71-70-69=210	−6
T5	(United States) Jay Haas	68-67-75=210	−6
T5	(United States) Skip Kendall	74-65-71=210	−6
T5	(Zimbabwe) Nick Price	70-71-69=210	−6
T9	(United States) Brandt Jobe	69-74-69=212	−4
T9	(Scotland) Colin Montgomerie	72-70-70=212	−4
T9	(New Zealand) Greg Turner	73-69-70=212	−4
T9	(United States) Brian Watts	69-71-72=212	−4
T9	(England) Lee Westwood	70-68-74=212	−4

=== Final round ===
Sunday, August 15, 1999

Place	Player	Score	To par	Money ($)
1	(United States) Tiger Woods	70-67-68-72=277	−11	630,000
2	(Spain) Sergio García	66-73-68-71=278	−10	378,000
T3	(United States) Stewart Cink	69-70-68-73=280	−8	203,000
T3	(United States) Jay Haas	68-67-75-70=280	−8	203,000
5	(Zimbabwe) Nick Price	70-71-69-71=281	−7	129,000
T6	(United States) Bob Estes	71-70-72-69=282	−6	112,000
T6	(Scotland) Colin Montgomerie	72-70-70-70=282	−6	112,000
T8	(United States) Steve Pate	72-70-73-69=284	−4	96,500
T8	(United States) Jim Furyk	71-70-69-74=284	−4	96,500
T10	(United States) David Duval	70-71-72-72=285	−3	72,167
T10	(United States) Corey Pavin	69-74-71-71=285	−3	72,167
T10	(United States) Chris Perry	70-73-71-71=285	−3	72,167
T10	(Spain) Miguel Ángel Jiménez	70-70-75-70=285	−3	72,167
T10	(Sweden) Jesper Parnevik	72-70-73-70=285	−3	72,167
T10	(Canada) Mike Weir	68-68-69-80=285	−3	72,167

==== Scorecard ====
Final round

Hole	1	2	3	4	5	6	7	8	9	10	11	12	13	14	15	16	17	18
Par	4	3	4	4	5	4	5	3	4	5	4	4	3	5	4	4	3	4
(United States) Woods	−11	−12	−12	−12	−13	−13	−14	−14	−14	−14	−15	−14	−12	−12	−12	−11	−11	−11
(Spain) García	−9	−8	−8	−8	−9	−9	−9	−9	−9	−10	−10	−10	−11	−11	−10	−10	−10	−10
(United States) Cink	−8	−8	−8	−8	−8	−8	−8	−8	−7	−7	−8	−8	−7	−8	−7	−8	−8	−8
(United States) Haas	−6	−6	−6	−6	−7	−7	−7	−7	−7	−7	−8	−7	−8	−8	−8	−8	−8	−8
(Zimbabwe) Price	−6	−7	−7	−8	−8	−9	−10	−10	−10	−10	−11	−10	−9	−9	−9	−7	−7	−7
(United States) Estes	−3	−3	−3	−3	−3	−4	−4	−4	−4	−5	−6	−6	−7	−8	−8	−7	−6	−6
(Scotland) Montgomerie	−4	−4	−5	−5	−6	−5	−4	−4	−4	−5	−5	−5	−5	−6	−6	−5	−5	−6
(United States) Furyk	−6	−4	−5	−5	−5	−5	−5	−5	−5	−6	−6	−6	−4	−5	−5	−5	−5	−4
(United States) Pate	−1	−1	−1	−2	−2	−3	−3	−3	−3	−3	−3	−3	−4	−4	−5	−5	−4	−4

Cumulative tournament scores, relative to par

Birdie	Bogey	Double bogey
