= Green Bay Country Club =

Country club in Wisconsin

Coordinates: 44°26′58″N 87°57′41″W

- Interactive map of Green Bay Country Club

Club information
- Location: Bellevue, Wisconsin, U.S.
- Established: 1995
- Type: Private
- Total holes: 18
- Website: Green Bay Country Club – Home

Green Bay Country Club
- Designed by: Dick Nugent
- Par: 72
- Length: 7097
- Course rating: 74.2
- Slope rating: 141

Green Bay Country Club (GBCC) is a country club located in Bellevue, Wisconsin. The club was established in 1995 and has two sections: a sports center and a golf course.

== Sports center ==
The sports center contains a swimming pool with a waterslide, beach volleyball, a cabana, six tennis courts, a nine-hole putting course, a practice putting and chipping green, and a six-hole par three golf course, also called the Quarry Course.

== Golf course ==
=== Tournaments ===
Green Bay Country Club was the home of the Great Lakes Classic, an event played during the first three years of the Women's Senior Golf Tour (now the Legends Tour). In 2000, the initial year of the tour, the tournament was sponsored by ShopKo and won by Vicki Fergon. In 2001 it was again sponsored by ShopKo, and won by Hollis Stacy. In 2002 the tournament was renamed the Copps Great Lakes Classic, and the winner was Patty Sheehan.

The course has also been the venue for the Wisconsin State Golf Association Match Play Championship.

Golf Digest has listed the course as one of the top 10 courses in Wisconsin.

=== Layout ===
The golf course has eighteen holes and has a total of eight teeing options.

==== Scorecard ====
Hole	Name	Yards	Par	Hole	Name	Yards	Par
1	Pair O' Threes	326	4	10	Turnaround	540	5
2	Deception	550	5	11	Pond	203	3
3	Plateau	350	4	12	Swale	410	4
4	Creekside	188	3	13	Up the Creek	200	3
5	Back from Yonder	387	4	14	Down and Out	439	4
6	Long	634	5	15	Over Yonder	398	4
7	Sentries	469	4	16	Merion	430	4
8	Rock Island	175	3	17	Augusta	557	5
9	Double Cross	450	4	18	Life's a Beach	391	4
Out		3,529	36	In		3,568	36
GBCC				Total		7,097	72

Green Bay Country Club
Tee	Rating/Slope	1	2	3	4	5	6	7	8	9	Out	10	11	12	13	14	15	16	17	18	In	Total
Black	74.2 / 141	326	550	350	188	387	634	469	175	450	3529	540	203	410	200	439	398	430	557	391	3568	7097
Blue	71.9 / 135	314	517	324	170	375	591	437	154	430	3312	526	174	366	178	417	376	420	537	391	3385	6697
Blue/Gold	70.8 / 132	314	517	300	170	359	516	409	154	398	3137	526	174	366	178	395	363	389	537	367	3295	6432
Gold	70.3 / 131	301	510	300	149	359	516	409	142	398	3084	508	142	348	156	395	363	389	520	367	3188	6272
Gold/White	69.0 / 128	301	477	275	149	359	516	382	142	363	2964	508	142	348	156	366	346	375	476	330	3047	6011
White	68.1 / 126	272	477	275	130	356	473	382	131	363	2859	494	137	331	149	366	346	375	476	330	3004	5863
SI	Men's	11	3	9	17	5	7	13	15	1		6	18	12	16	8	10	4	2	14
Par		4	5	4	3	4	5	4	3	4	36	5	3	4	3	4	4	4	5	4	36	72
SI	Women's	1	7	3	17	11	9	13	15	5		4	18	14	16	12	6	8	2	10
Green	70.6 / 125	261	419	275	109	240	442	330	131	363	2570	442	137	264	149	316	321	337	465	308	2739	5309
Red	69.0 / 121	249	419	233	109	240	442	330	91	300	2413	412	120	264	108	316	321	337	428	282	2588	5001
