= Carol Sorenson Flenniken =

American amateur golfer (born 1942)

Carol Sorenson Flenniken (born November 15, 1942) is an American amateur golfer. She was first in six Wisconsin State Golf Association events between 1956 and 1963. She was also the 1960 U.S. Girls' Junior winner. Additional wins included the 1962 Women's Collegiate Golf Championship and 1964 British Ladies Amateur. With the Americans during 1964, they won the Curtis Cup and were second at the Espirito Santo Trophy.

Following her wedding, Carol Flenniken and the United States won the 1966 Curtis Cup. She had 25 Colorado Women's Golf Association event wins between 1968 and 1999. Her "record for career CGA women's/CWGA championships" was surpassed in 2022. Flennkiken became a member of the Wisconsin Golf Hall of Fame in 1983 and the Women's Golf Coaches Association Players Hall of Fame during 1989.

== Early life and education ==
Sorenson was born in Janesville, Wisconsin, on November 15, 1942. During her childhood, she became a golfer. She entered Arizona State University in 1961. The following year, she was the Women's Collegiate Golf Championship winner. She completed a Bachelor of Science in 1966.

== Career ==
=== 1956 to 1965 ===
As a Wisconsin State Golf Association player, Sorenson won the Junior Girls Match Play Championship in 1956 and 1958. She had victories at their Women's State Amateur Championship four times between 1959 and 1963. During this time period, Sorenson was first at the 1959 Women's Western Junior and second during the 1965 edition. Her wins also include the 1960 U.S. Girls' Junior and 1962 Women's Western Amateur.

At the 1963 U.S. Women's Amateur, she reached the semi-finals. Throughout 1964, Sorenson finished first at the Women's Trans-Mississippi and the British Ladies Amateur. Her American team were that year's winners at the Curtis Cup and second during the Espirito Santo Trophy.

=== 1966 – present ===
Following her 1966 wedding, Flenniken moved to Denver. There she won 25 events held by the Colorado Women's Golf Association between 1968 and 1999. These included the Stroke Play Championship eight times and four times at the Match Play Championship. She held the "record for career CGA women's/CWGA championships" until 2022.

Throughout these years, Flenniken won the 1966 Curtis Cup with the Americans. At LPGA Tour events, she had a 16th place tie at the 1974 National Jewish Hospital Open. Flenniken lived in Eugene, Oregon, between 1978 and 1980. During 1979, she had top four finishes at the Oregon Amateur and the Pacific Northwest Golf Association Championship.

She was an accountant at Eugene Country Club in 1978. Flenniken continued to work in finance at golf clubs in Colorado up to the early 2000s. Starting in 2019, "[she] barely played golf ... because of a bad back". By 2020, Flenniken underwent back surgery while remaining a golfer.

== Honors and personal life ==
In 1964, the Associated Press gave Sorenson the Wisconsin Athlete of the Year award. She was "the first female to win the honor". Flenniken joined the Colorado Golf Hall of Fame in 1975. She entered the Arizona State Sun Devil Hall of Fame the following year.

Flenniken also became a member of the Wisconsin Golf Hall of Fame in 1983 and the Women's Golf Coaches Association Players Hall of Fame in 1989. She was named Player of the Year by the CGWA in 1995. Flenniken was married until 2013. During a 1978 interview, Flenniken stated: "If I hadn't gotten married I probably would have turned pro."
