= Golf Hall of Fame =

Golf Hall of Fame may refer to:

- World Golf Hall of Fame, St. Augustine, Florida
- Canadian Golf Hall of Fame
- National Black Golf Hall of Fame
- Connecticut Golf Hall of Fame
- Wisconsin Golf Hall of Fame
