= David Merkow =

American surgeon and golfer (born 1985)

Personal information
- Full name: David Bartos Merkow
- Nationality: United States
- Born: May 5, 1985 (age 41) Boston, Massachusetts, U.S.
- Height: 6 ft 3 in (1.91 m)
- Weight: 210 lb (95 kg; 15 st)

Career
- Sport: Golf
- College: Northwestern University
- Status: Professional

Achievements and awards
- Gold Medal Individual Golf Competition (Open Division) Pan American Maccabi Games: 2008
- Gold Medal Team Golf Competition (U.S.) Pan American Maccabi Games: 2008

David Bartos Merkow (born May 5, 1985) is an American orthopedic surgeon and retired professional golfer.

He won the World Junior Masters tournament boys 14–15 division as a youth in 2000, and the American Junior Golf Association's SLI Junior Classic boys division two years later. In June 2005 he and a former high school teammate won the Wisconsin State Golf Association Best-Ball title.

For college, he attended Northwestern University. There, he won the individual title at the Second Annual Big Ten/Pac-10 Challenge in 2005, was named Big Ten Conference Player of the Year in 2006, and finished his college career 6th in Northwestern's all-time stroke average, at 74.27.

In 2008, playing in Argentina in the 11th Pan American Maccabi Games, he won two gold medals; both in the individual competition, and with the U.S. team in the team competition. In 2010 he was playing in the NGA Hooters Tour. As of 2020, he was training to be an orthopedic surgeon.

== Early life and high school ==
Merkow was born in Boston, Massachusetts, and grew up in Hartland, Wisconsin, 30 miles (48 km) from Milwaukee. His grandfather taught him how to play golf. In August 2000, he won the World Junior Masters tournament boys 14–15 division with a 227. In August 2002, he won the American Junior Golf Association's SLI Junior Classic boys division in New Seabury, Massachusetts, with a 212 (2 over par).

In Arrowhead Union High School in Hartland, he was co-Captain of the golf team in his senior year, and was a two-time all-state honoree (as a junior and senior, in 2002 and 2003).

He was one of only three Jewish students at the high school. Speaking about being Jewish, Merkow observed: "It does drive me. When I make it on [the PGA] Tour, I'd like it to be known that I'm Jewish. Whether it's wearing my Star of David [around his neck], or having a Chai on my [golf] bag, I want to show that there are good Jewish athletes."

== College ==
He chose to attend Northwestern University, where he was an economics major.

Merkow won the individual title at the Second Annual Big Ten/Pac-10 Challenge in October 2005, and led his team to the team title. He beat 2005 NCAA Champion James Lepp, with a 54-hole career-best score of 209 (7-under). In April 2006, at the 36th Robert Kepler Intercollegiate he took third place, with a 1-over 217. He was named Big Ten Golfer of the Week on March 2, 2006.

In 2006, he was named Big Ten Conference Player of the Year. He was the first golfer from Northwestern to win the award since Luke Donald in 2001. He was also ranked number one in the Golfweek/Sagarin Big Ten Player Ratings for the year. During 2005–06, he was in the top 20 in a total of six tournaments.

In April 2007, after he finished tied for 4th at the Kepler Intercollegiate, he optimistically said: "We've significantly underachieved this year. But no one will remember this if we win another Big Ten championship." In May 2007, however, his team narrowly missed the cut for the NCAA Championships which it had participated in the prior year, by a mere two strokes at the NCAA Central Regional Championship.

His teammate Kyle Moore said that: "It's hard to gauge how long he hits. If he [were] on the PGA Tour, he'd be one of the longest drivers out there." His coach Pat Goss observed that his skill at hitting iron shots into the wind distinguished him from other golfers. Speaking of Merkow in 2007, Goss predicted: "He is someone who is on the cusp of really doing something spectacular. He has a lot of talent."

Merkow graduated in June 2007, and ended his career 6th in Northwestern's all-time stroke average, at 74.27. In addition to his Conference Player of the Year honors, he was twice named All-Big Ten, was named to the Ping All-Midwest Region team, and was Academic All-Big Ten.

== International career ==
Merkow, playing in his first Maccabi Games, won a gold medal in the individual competition in the 11th Pan American Maccabi Games (which ended on January 2, 2008) at Hacoaj Golf Club in Buenos Aires, Argentina. He had a score of 282 (−10), competing in the age 18-and-up open division, winning with a 67 in the last round. He also won a second gold medal as the U.S. bested second-place Argentina in the team competition. For the first time he met cousins of his who lived in the city, and said: "It was absolutely unbelievable. It could not have been more special. I gave them one of my gold medals."

== U.S. career ==
In June 2004, at the age of 18, he was a semifinalist at the Wisconsin State Golf Association Match Play Championship.

In June 2005, he and former high school teammate Charlie Delsman won the Wisconsin State Golf Association Best-Ball title. In the 2005 Wisconsin State Golf Association Match Play Championship's last match, he lost 3 and 1.

In July 2006, he tied for fourth with a 289 at the Wisconsin 105th State Amateur Championship.

Merkow also played in the U.S. Amateur. In 2006 he played at the 7,473-yard (6,833 m) Hazeltine National Golf Club course in Minnesota, with his 71 being the second-lowest score in the 312-player field after the first day of stroke play. He was a quarter-finalist. He beat Malaysian golfer Ben Leong 5–3 in the first round. But he lost in the second round of match play to stroke-play medalist Billy Horschel, 3 and 1.

Merkow won the August 2007 U.S. Amateur qualifier at Hartland's Chenequa Country Club with scores of 66 and 64, for a 12-under 130. Later than month he played at the 107th U.S. Amateur at The Olympic Club in San Francisco, where he shot two back-to-back under-2 rounds of 69 to make the round of 64, and was one of just four golfers to put up sub-par numbers in stroke play, but was eliminated in the first round of match play. Because stroke play totals don't affect match play results, Merkow had observed: "There are two tournaments this week. Anybody who's in the top 64 can win. It starts over tomorrow." In 2007 he lost to Brendan Gielow 3–2. Making the match play both years, Merkow finished 21st and 2nd in the stroke play portion of the event.

CBS College Sports reported in May 2007 that in a qualifier at North Shore Country Club in Mequon, Wisconsin, Merkow shot a 2-under 70. That score was good enough for a tie for medalist honors, and afforded him a spot in the sectional qualifying round for the U.S. Open. He said: "My goal is to miss my graduation. It's June 15, which would be the Friday of the U.S. Open." In June 2007, however, he failed to qualify in the sectional qualifying at Scioto Country Club.

He has full status on the Hooters Tour, after winning the 2008 NGA Hooters Tour Ranking School by 4 shots. He has also played on the Gateway Tour.

In May 2010, Merkow advanced to the U.S. Open sectionals with a 69 at a local qualifying round at Illini Country Club.

In July 2015 he married physician Jordan Scher.

== Coaching ==
He was named assistant men's golf coach at Marquette University in August 2010. He joined the staff of Steve Bailey, his former assistant coach at Northwestern.

== Post-golf career ==
As of 2020, Merkow was training to be an orthopedic surgeon at New York University.

Merkow is currently an orthopedic surgeon specializing in upper extremities at Orthopaedic Associates of Wisconsin, headquartered in Pewaukee, Wisconsin.

== Awards and honors ==
- In 2005 finished in 10th place at the Big Ten Championships.
- In 2006 named first-team All-Big Ten honors and Big Ten Player of the Year.
- In 2007 named a second-team All-Big Ten.

== See also ==
- List of Jewish golfers
