= 2012 Ryder Cup =

Golf tournament in Illinois, United States

39th Ryder Cup Matches
- Dates: September 28–30, 2012
- Venue: Medinah Country Club; Course No. 3
- Location: Medinah, Illinois
- Captains: Davis Love III (USA); José María Olazábal (Europe)
(United States)	13 1/2	14 1/2	(Europe)
- Europe wins the Ryder Cup

Location map
- Location within Illinois

The 39th Ryder Cup was held September 28–30, 2012, in the United States at the Medinah Country Club in Medinah, Illinois, a suburb northwest of Chicago. This was the first time that the Ryder Cup was held in Illinois. Europe went into the competition as the cup holders, having won in 2010 to regain it. The team captains were Davis Love III for the U.S. and José María Olazábal for Europe.

At the start of the final day's play, the U.S. led 10–6 and required 4 1/2 points to win; Europe required 8 points to retain the cup and 8 1/2 to win it outright. Europe achieved one of the greatest comebacks in Ryder Cup history by winning eight and tying one of the 12 singles matches. Martin Kaymer's five-foot putt on the 18th hole to defeat Steve Stricker took the score to 14–13, allowing Europe to retain the cup with one match still in progress. Tiger Woods missed a putt on the final green and conceded the hole to Francesco Molinari, halving the final point and securing outright victory for the European team, 14 1/2–13 1/2. It was named by European media covering the event as the "Miracle at Medinah", and is widely regarded as one of the best sporting comebacks of all time and the greatest in Ryder Cup history.

The victory was Europe's second consecutive and fifth in the last six contests. European captain Olazábal dedicated the victory to his countryman Seve Ballesteros. The five-time major champion, who had scored 22 1/2 points in 37 matches and been part of four victorious European sides before captaining them to victory on home soil at Valderrama in 1997, had died of brain cancer in May 2011 at the age of 54, and in his memory, Team Europe wore navy blue and white garments – his traditional Sunday colors – on the final day. Additionally, the team's kit also bore the silhouette of Ballesteros famously celebrating his win at the 1984 Open Championship at the Old Course at St Andrews.

== Format ==
The Ryder Cup is a match play event, with each match worth one point. The competition format was:

- Day 1 (Friday) – 4 foursome (alternate shot) matches in the morning session and 4 fourball (better ball) matches in the afternoon session
- Day 2 (Saturday) – 4 foursome matches in the morning session and 4 fourball matches in the afternoon session
- Day 3 (Sunday) – 12 singles matches

On the first two days there were 4 foursome matches and 4 fourball matches, with the home captain choosing which were played in the morning and which in the afternoon.

With a total of 28 points available, 14 1/2 points are required to win the Cup, and 14 points are required for the defending champion to retain the Cup. All matches are played to a maximum of 18 holes.

== Course ==
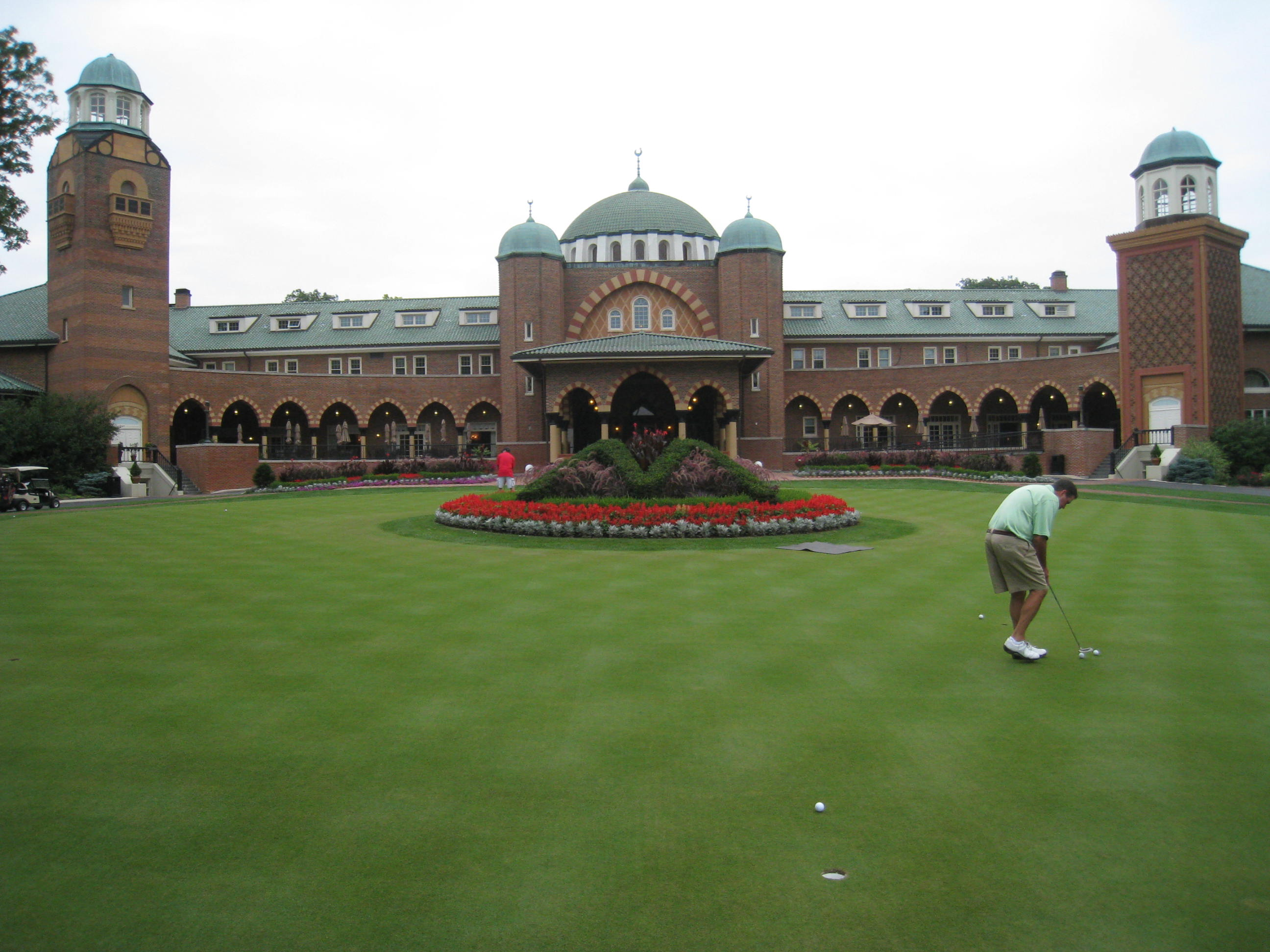
Clubhouse at Medinah Country Club in 2008

As part of its 2012 preparations, Medinah commissioned a $1.5 million greens renovation project on their Course No. 3, led by golf course architect Rees Jones. The project included a dramatic redesign of the 15th hole.

The redesigned 15th offers players with a 'risk-reward' opportunity with a driveable par-four by reducing its length by 100 yards and adding a two-acre lake that borders the right side of the fairway and green. The forward tee allows the hole to be set up as short as 280 yards. The original tee area of 392 yards from the championship tees was preserved to provide the club with flexibility in course set-up.

Jones, who has overseen all architectural design aspects of Medinah's three golf courses since 2000, moved the 15th green to the left (south), which made way for the creation of a new back tee for the 16th hole. The tree-lined par-four now measures 15 yards longer – playing approximately 470 yards from the championship tees.

The major greens renovation took place on eleven of Course No. 3's original 18 greens and its main putting green, which was rebuilt to USGA specifications. Course No. 3's other six greens were re-grassed and the 15th green rebuilt.

Medinah's Course No. 3 has hosted multiple major championships. The U.S. Open has been held at the course three times: 1949 (won by Cary Middlecoff), 1975 (Lou Graham), and 1990 (Hale Irwin). Tiger Woods has won both PGA Championships held at the course (1999 and 2006). Gary Player won the U.S. Senior Open in 1988.

Before the 2012 Ryder Cup, Europe players Lee Westwood and Sergio García criticised the course, particularly for its lack of rough, trees and other hazards. García said: "There's not a lot of thinking when you get on the tee. You can pretty much hit it nice and hard and, even if you miss, pretty much every time you'll have a shot."

The course measures 7,657 yards (7,002 m) off the 'gold' tees.

Hole	1	2	3	4	5	6	7	8	9	Out	10	11	12	13	14	15	16	17	18	In	Total
Yards	433	192	412	463	536	509	617	201	432	3,795	578	440	476	245	609	390	482	193	449	3,862	7,657
Par	4	3	4	4	5	4	5	3	4	36	5	4	4	3	5	4	4	3	4	36	72

== Television ==
All matches were covered live in the United States. ESPN handled Friday coverage. Mike Tirico and Paul Azinger hosted from the 18th tower, with Curtis Strange and Sean McDonough calling holes, and on-course reporters Andy North and Billy Kratzert. Scott Van Pelt hosted recaps during coverage. On Saturday, Golf Channel covered the first half-hour of the morning matches with Kelly Tilghman, Brandel Chamblee and Nick Faldo. NBC covered the remainder of the weekend action, with Dan Hicks and Johnny Miller hosting from the 18th tower, Gary Koch and Peter Jacobsen calling holes, and on-course reporters Mark Rolfing, Roger Maltbie, and Dottie Pepper. To bring a European perspective to the telecasts, former European Ryder Cup player Colin Montgomerie was utilized as a guest analyst by NBC on Saturday. NBC had previously used guest analysts for the Ryder Cup in 1999, 2002, and 2006

The matches were covered live in the United Kingdom by Sky Sports, with the BBC screening highlights later.

== Team qualification and selection ==
=== United States ===
The United States qualification rules remained the same as for 2010 and the team consisted of:

- The leading eight players on the Ryder Cup Points List
  - Points were gained from money earned in majors in 2011 and official PGA Tour events in 2012 through the PGA Championship on August 12. One point is awarded for every $1,000 earned. Money earned in 2012 majors count double and money earned in 2012 alternate events (those played opposite the majors or World Golf Championships) count half.
- Four captain's picks
  - Announced on September 4, the four captain's picks were Jim Furyk, Steve Stricker, Dustin Johnson and Brandt Snedeker.

The leading players on the US Ryder Cup points list were:

Position	Name	2011 Majors	2012 Majors	Regular events	Alternate events	Points
1	Tiger Woods (Q)	330.667	1452.717	4230.800	0	6014.184
2	Bubba Watson (Q)	153.617	3286.659	2374.778	0	5815.054
3	Jason Dufner (Q)	865.000	892.530	3939.772	0	5697.302
4	Keegan Bradley (Q)	1445.000	999.095	3107.111	0	5551.206
5	Webb Simpson (Q)	219.868	2932.800	1482.832	0	4635.500
6	Zach Johnson (Q)	156.821	446.878	3887.845	0	4491.544
7	Matt Kuchar (Q)	265.131	1154.572	3029.239	0	4448.942
8	Phil Mickelson (Q)	847.143	874.686	2511.279	0	4233.108
9	Hunter Mahan	81.214	560.441	3440.573	0	4082.228
10	Steve Stricker (P)	541.075	855.146	2618.848	0	4015.069
11	Jim Furyk (P)				0	3369.616
12	Rickie Fowler				0	3313.338
13	Brandt Snedeker (P)				0	3176.787
14	Bo Van Pelt				0	3152.315
15	Dustin Johnson (P)				0	3040.020

Players in the qualifying places (Q) are shown in green. Captains picks (P) are shown in yellow.

=== Europe ===
The European team qualification rules changed after the 2010 contest. The European Points List took precedence over the World Points List, while the captain's picks were reduced from 3 to 2 with the top 5 players in the World Points List now qualifying rather than the top 4. The team consisted of:

- The leading five players on the Ryder Cup European Points List
  - Points (1 Point = 1 Euro) earned in official European Tour events from September 1, 2011, to the conclusion of the 2012 Johnnie Walker Championship on August 26
- The leading five players, not qualified above, on the Ryder Cup World Points List
  - Total World Rankings Points earned in Official World Golf Ranking events from September 1, 2011, to August 20, 2012, and thereafter in the 2012 Johnnie Walker Championship only
- Two captain's picks
  - The two captain's picks were announced on Monday, August 27, the day after the completion of the Johnnie Walker Championship. Olazábal chose Nicolas Colsaerts and Ian Poulter. Colsaerts became the first player from Belgium to play in the Ryder Cup.

Only members of the European Tour could earn points in the above two lists. They could be full or affiliate members and must have also satisfied (or to be planning to satisfy) their membership obligations. Martin Laird did not become an affiliate member until 2012 and so his performances in 2011 were not counted. Carl Pettersson was not a member of the European Tour and was therefore not considered.

The leading players in the European Ryder Cup points lists were:

European points list
Position	Name	Points
1	Rory McIlroy (Q)	4,050,288
2	Justin Rose (Q)	2,602,910
3	Paul Lawrie (Q)	2,384,837
4	Graeme McDowell (Q)	2,375,791
5	Francesco Molinari (Q)	2,112,452
6	Peter Hanson (q)	2,022,432
7	Luke Donald (q)	1,885,171
8	Martin Kaymer (q)	1,871,797
9	Nicolas Colsaerts (P)	1,755,377
10	Lee Westwood (q)	1,692,030
11	Gonzalo Fernández-Castaño	1,613,602
12	David Lynn	1,563,740
13	Sergio García (q)	1,502,773
14	Rafa Cabrera-Bello	1,494,745
15	Álvaro Quirós	1,377,895
16	Marcel Siem	1,385,518
17	Ian Poulter (P)	1,290,896

World points list
Position	Name	Points
1	Rory McIlroy (q)	468.81
2	Luke Donald (Q)	363.46
3	Justin Rose (q)	322.33
4	Lee Westwood (Q)	280.27
5	Graeme McDowell (q)	262.62
6	Paul Lawrie (q)	211.49
7	Sergio García (Q)	200.85
8	Francesco Molinari (q)	191.25
9	Peter Hanson (Q)	189.32
10	Martin Kaymer (Q)	172.26
11	Ian Poulter (P)	171.64
12	Nicolas Colsaerts (P)	161.67
13	Rafa Cabrera-Bello	144.20
14	David Lynn	143.01
15	Gonzalo Fernández-Castaño	134.93

Players in qualifying places (Q) are shown in green; captain's picks (P) are shown in yellow; those in italics (q) qualified through the other points list.

== Teams ==
=== Captains ===
The captains were Davis Love III for team USA and José María Olazábal for Europe.

=== Vice-captains ===
Each captain selected four vice-captains to assist him during the tournament.

Love named the first two USA vice-captains in June 2012 and announced the other two after the PGA Championship.

- Fred Couples
- Mike Hulbert
- Jeff Sluman
- Scott Verplank

Olazábal named three of his vice-captains on August 16. The fourth vice-captain was announced on August 25.

- Thomas Bjørn
- Darren Clarke
- Paul McGinley
- Miguel Ángel Jiménez

=== Players ===
Team USA
Name	Age	Points rank	World ranking	Previous Ryder Cups	Matches	W–L–H	Winning percentage
Tiger Woods	36	1	2	6	29	13–14–2	48.28
Bubba Watson	33	2	7	1	4	1–3–0	25.00
Jason Dufner	35	3	9	0	Rookie		
Keegan Bradley	26	4	14	0	Rookie		
Webb Simpson	27	5	8	0	Rookie		
Zach Johnson	36	6	17	2	7	3–3–1	50.00
Matt Kuchar	34	7	15	1	4	1–1–2	50.00
Phil Mickelson	42	8	16	8	34	11–17–6	41.18
Steve Stricker	45	10	12	2	7	3–3–1	50.00
Jim Furyk	42	11	23	7	27	8–15–4	37.04
Brandt Snedeker	31	13	10	0	Rookie		
Dustin Johnson	28	15	13	1	4	1–3–0	25.00

Captains picks are shown in yellow; the world rankings and records are at the start of the 2012 Ryder Cup.

Team Europe
Name	Country	Age	Points rank (European)	Points rank (World)	World ranking	Previous Ryder Cups	Matches	W–L–H	Winning percentage
Rory McIlroy	Northern Ireland	23	1	1	1	1	4	1–1–2	50.00
Justin Rose	England	32	2	3	5	1	4	3–1–0	75.00
Paul Lawrie	Scotland	43	3	6	28	1	5	3–1–1	70.00
Graeme McDowell	Northern Ireland	33	4	5	18	2	8	4–2–2	62.50
Francesco Molinari	Italy	29	5	8	31	1	3	0–2–1	16.67
Luke Donald	England	34	7	2	3	3	11	8–2–1	77.27
Lee Westwood	England	39	10	4	4	7	33	16–11–6	57.58
Sergio García	Spain	32	13	7	19	5	24	14–6–4	66.67
Peter Hanson	Sweden	34	6	9	25	1	3	1–2–0	33.33
Martin Kaymer	Germany	27	8	10	32	1	4	2–1–1	62.50
Nicolas Colsaerts	Belgium	29	9	12	35	0	Rookie		
Ian Poulter	England	36	17	11	26	3	11	8–3–0	72.73

Captains picks are shown in yellow; the world rankings and records are at the start of the 2012 Ryder Cup.

== Friday's matches ==
=== Morning foursomes ===
	Results
McIlroy/McDowell	(Europe) 1 up	Furyk/Snedeker
Donald/García	(United States) 4 & 3	Mickelson/Bradley
Westwood/Molinari	(United States) 3 & 2	Dufner/Z. Johnson
Poulter/Rose	(Europe) 2 & 1	Stricker/Woods
2	Session	2
2	Overall	2

=== Afternoon four-balls ===
Match 3 (Rose/Kaymer v. D. Johnson/Kuchar) started after Match 4 (Westwood/Colsaerts v. Woods/Stricker). The table below reflects the official order.

	Results
Lawrie/Hanson	(United States) 5 & 4	Watson/Simpson
McIlroy/McDowell	(United States) 2 & 1	Mickelson/Bradley
Rose/Kaymer	(United States) 3 & 2	D. Johnson/Kuchar
Westwood/Colsaerts	(Europe) 1 up	Woods/Stricker
1	Session	3
3	Overall	5

== Saturday's matches ==
=== Morning foursomes ===
	Results
Rose/Poulter	(Europe) 1 up	Watson/Simpson
Westwood/Donald	(United States) 7 & 6	Bradley/Mickelson
Colsaerts/García	(United States) 2 & 1	Dufner/Z. Johnson
McIlroy/McDowell	(United States) 1 up	Furyk/Snedeker
1	Session	3
4	Overall	8

=== Afternoon four-balls ===
Match 1 (Colsaerts/Lawrie v. D. Johnson/Kuchar) started after Match 2 (Rose/Molinari v. Watson/Simpson). The table below reflects the official order.

	Results
Colsaerts/Lawrie	(United States) 1 up	D. Johnson/Kuchar
Rose/Molinari	(United States) 5 & 4	Watson/Simpson
García/Donald	(Europe) 1 up	Woods/Stricker
McIlroy/Poulter	(Europe) 1 up	Dufner/Z. Johnson
2	Session	2
6	Overall	10

== Sunday's singles matches ==
	Results		Timetable
Luke Donald	(Europe) 2 & 1	Bubba Watson	1st: 7 – 10
Ian Poulter	(Europe) 2 up	Webb Simpson	4th: 10 – 10
Rory McIlroy	(Europe) 2 & 1	Keegan Bradley	3rd: 9 – 10
Justin Rose	(Europe) 1 up	Phil Mickelson	6th: 11 – 11
Paul Lawrie	(Europe) 5 & 3	Brandt Snedeker	2nd: 8 – 10
Nicolas Colsaerts	(United States) 3 & 2	Dustin Johnson	5th: 10 – 11
Graeme McDowell	(United States) 2 & 1	Zach Johnson	7th: 11 – 12
Sergio García	(Europe) 1 up	Jim Furyk	9th: 13 – 12
Peter Hanson	(United States) 2 up	Jason Dufner	10th: 13 – 13
Lee Westwood	(Europe) 3 & 2	Matt Kuchar	8th: 12 – 12
Martin Kaymer	(Europe) 1 up	Steve Stricker	11th: 14 – 13
Francesco Molinari	halved	Tiger Woods	12th: 14 1/2 – 13 1/2
8 1/2	Session	3 1/2
14 1/2	Overall	13 1/2

== Individual player records ==
Each entry refers to the win–loss–half record of the player.

=== United States ===
Player	Points	Overall	Singles	Foursomes	Fourballs
Keegan Bradley	3	3–1–0	0–1–0	2–0–0	1–0–0
Jason Dufner	3	3–1–0	1–0–0	2–0–0	0–1–0
Jim Furyk	1	1–2–0	0–1–0	1–1–0	0–0–0
Dustin Johnson	3	3–0–0	1–0–0	0–0–0	2–0–0
Zach Johnson	3	3–1–0	1–0–0	2–0–0	0–1–0
Matt Kuchar	2	2–1–0	0–1–0	0–0–0	2–0–0
Phil Mickelson	3	3–1–0	0–1–0	2–0–0	1–0–0
Webb Simpson	2	2–2–0	0–1–0	0–1–0	2–0–0
Brandt Snedeker	1	1–2–0	0–1–0	1–1–0	0–0–0
Steve Stricker	0	0–4–0	0–1–0	0–1–0	0–2–0
Bubba Watson	2	2–2–0	0–1–0	0–1–0	2–0–0
Tiger Woods	0.5	0–3–1	0–0–1	0–1–0	0–2–0

=== Europe ===
Player	Points	Overall	Singles	Foursomes	Fourballs
Nicolas Colsaerts	1	1–3–0	0–1–0	0–1–0	1–1–0
Luke Donald	2	2–2–0	1–0–0	0–2–0	1–0–0
Sergio García	2	2–2–0	1–0–0	0–2–0	1–0–0
Peter Hanson	0	0–2–0	0–1–0	0–0–0	0–1–0
Martin Kaymer	1	1–1–0	1–0–0	0–0–0	0–1–0
Paul Lawrie	1	1–2–0	1–0–0	0–0–0	0–2–0
Graeme McDowell	1	1–3–0	0–1–0	1–1–0	0–1–0
Rory McIlroy	3	3–2–0	1–0–0	1–1–0	1–1–0
Francesco Molinari	0.5	0–2–1	0–0–1	0–1–0	0–1–0
Ian Poulter	4	4–0–0	1–0–0	2–0–0	1–0–0
Justin Rose	3	3–2–0	1–0–0	2–0–0	0–2–0
Lee Westwood	2	2–2–0	1–0–0	0–2–0	1–0–0

== Media reaction ==
In the United States, The Wall Street Journal asked how could "an extremely talented American Ryder Cup team blow a final-day lead as large as any ever blown in 85 years of Ryder Cup history", while Chicago Tribune sportswriter David Haugh described the defeat as "inexcusable" having led 10–4 at one point on Saturday afternoon. Captain Davis Love III came under scrutiny for his player selections, and USA Today centered its criticism on Tiger Woods, calling him a player the U.S. "could not rely on" and "who at times appeared to be barely there." Some American newspapers elected not to dedicate back-page columns to the event.

The European victory was met with elation across the continent. Spain's daily sport newspaper Marca ran the headline: "This one is for you, Seve". Britain's Daily Telegraph wrote that after an unprecedented summer of sporting achievements, including the Olympic Games in London, Bradley Wiggins' victory in the Tour de France and Andy Murray's first tennis major at the US Open, the Ryder Cup was incapable of "dullness, one-sidedness, and hollow drama" despite the looming anti-climax at the start of the singles matches on the final day. In a reference to the economic crisis on the continent, The Irish Times said that German Martin Kaymer had given Europe "a massive bailout that contributed to the most unlikeliest comeback in Ryder Cup history".
