= 1949 U.S. Open (golf) =

Golf tournament

Coordinates: 41.966°N 88.048°W

Tournament information
- Dates: June 9–11, 1949
- Location: Medinah, Illinois
- Course(s): Medinah Country Club; Course No. 3
- Organized by: USGA
- Tour: PGA Tour

Statistics
- Par: 71
- Length: 6,981 yards (6,383 m)
- Field: 159 players, 51 after cut
- Cut: 150 (+8)
- Prize fund: $10,000
- Winner's share: $2,000

Champion
- (United States) Cary Middlecoff
- 286 (+2)

Location in the United States
Location in Illinois

The 1949 U.S. Open was the 49th U.S. Open, held June 9–11 at Medinah Country Club in Medinah, Illinois, a suburb northwest of Chicago. Cary Middlecoff won the first of his two U.S. Open titles, one stroke ahead of runners-up Clayton Heafner and Sam Snead. For Snead, it was the third of four second-place finishes at the only major championship he never won. Middlecoff, a dentist, won his second U.S. Open in 1956.

Middlecoff began the championship with a 75, but rebounded with scores of 67-69 in the next two rounds to take a one-shot lead over Buck White after 54 holes. In the final round, Middlecoff was paired with Heafner, and the two exchanged the lead several times during the round. Heafner went ahead by one after the 11th, then double-bogeyed 12 to give Middlecoff the lead. After a Heafner birdie at 13, the two were tied again. Heafner then bogeyed 14 to fall one behind, a deficit he would not be able to overcome after missing a 6-footer for birdie at 18 that would have forced a Sunday playoff. Snead also had a chance to force a playoff with a birdie at the last, but his approach shot missed the green and he could only save par.

Byron Nelson, the 1939 champion, came out of retirement but missed the cut. He played the U.S. Open six years later in 1955, then retired for good. Two-time champion Ralph Guldahl played in his final U.S. Open. Defending champion Ben Hogan missed the tournament after being severely injured in an automobile accident in February. He returned the following year and won three of the next four U.S. Opens.

This was the first U.S. Open at Medinah, which returned in 1975 and 1990, both ending in 18-hole playoffs. It later hosted the PGA Championship in 1999 and 2006, both won by Tiger Woods, and the Ryder Cup in 2012.

== Round summaries ==
=== First round ===
Friday, June 9, 1949

Place	Player	Score	To par
1	(United States) Les Kennedy	69	−2
T2	(United States) Herman Barron	70	−1
T2	(United States) Al Brosch	70	−1
T2	(United States) Charles Farlow	70	−1
T2	(United States) Chick Harbert	70	−1
T6	(United States) Pete Cooper	71	E
T6	(Scotland) Bobby Cruickshank	71	E
T6	(United States) Ralph Guldahl	71	E
T6	(United States) Claude Harmon	71	E
T6	(United States) Johnny Palmer	71	E
T6	(United States) Bus Peele	71	E
T6	(United States) Lew Worsham	71	E

=== Second round ===
Saturday, June 10, 1949

Place	Player	Score	To par
1	(United States) Al Brosch	70-71=141	−1
T2	(United States) Cary Middlecoff	75-67=142	E
T2	(United States) Buck White	74-68=142	E
T4	(United States) Claude Harmon	71-72=143	+1
T4	(United States) Clayton Heafner	72-71=143	+1
T4	(United States) Les Kennedy	69-74=143	+1
7	(United States) Pete Cooper	71-73=144	+2
T8	(United States) Bob Harris	76-69=145	+3
T8	(South Africa) Bobby Locke	74-71=145	+3
T8	(United States) Ellsworth Vines	73-72=145	+3

=== Third round ===
Saturday, June 11, 1949 (morning)

Place	Player	Score	To par
1	(United States) Cary Middlecoff	75-67-69=211	−2
2	(United States) Buck White	74-68-70=212	−1
T3	(United States) Al Brosch	70-71-73=214	+1
T3	(United States) Clayton Heafner	72-71-71=214	+1
5	(United States) Ellsworth Vines	73-72-71=216	+3
T6	(United States) Dave Douglas	74-73-70=217	+4
T6	(United States) Claude Harmon	71-72-74=217	+4
T6	(United States) Eric Monti	75-72-70=217	+4
T6	(United States) Sam Snead	73-73-71=217	+4
T6	(United States) Jim Turnesa	78-69-70=217	+4

=== Final round ===
Saturday, June 11, 1949 (afternoon)

Place	Player	Score	To par	Money ($)
1	(United States) Cary Middlecoff	75-67-69-75=286	+2	2,000
T2	(United States) Clayton Heafner	72-71-71-73=287	+3	1,250
T2	(United States) Sam Snead	73-73-71-70=287	+3	1,250
T4	(South Africa) Bobby Locke	74-71-73-71=289	+5	700
T4	(United States) Jim Turnesa	78-69-70-72=289	+5	700
T6	(United States) Dave Douglas	74-73-70-73=290	+6	450
T6	(United States) Buck White	74-68-70-78=290	+6	450
T8	(United States) Pete Cooper	71-73-74-73=291	+7	300
T8	(United States) Claude Harmon	71-72-74-74=291	+7	300
T8	(United States) Johnny Palmer	71-75-72-73=291	+7	300
