= 1990 U.S. Open (golf) =

Tournament information
- Dates: June 14–18, 1990
- Location: Medinah, Illinois; 41.966°N 88.048°W
- Courses: Medinah Country Club, Course No. 3
- Tour: PGA Tour

Statistics
- Par: 72
- Length: 7,185 yards (6,570 m)
- Field: 156 players, 68 after cut
- Cut: 145 (+1)
- Prize fund: $1,200,000
- Winner's share: $220,000

Champion
- (United States) Hale Irwin
- 280 (−8), playoff

Location map
- Location in the United States Location in Illinois

The 1990 U.S. Open was the 90th U.S. Open, held June 14–18 at Course No. 3 of Medinah Country Club in Medinah, Illinois, a suburb northwest of Chicago. Hale Irwin became the oldest U.S. Open champion by defeating Mike Donald at the 91st hole, the first in sudden-death, after the two tied in the 18-hole Monday playoff. It was Irwin's third U.S. Open title, with previous wins in 1974 and 1979. Implemented decades earlier, it was the first use of sudden-death in the U.S. Open; the last tie in a playoff was in 1946. Sudden death was needed again in 1994 and 2008.

It was the third U.S. Open at Medinah, which previously hosted in 1949 and 1975. It later hosted the PGA Championship in 1999 and 2006, and the Ryder Cup in 2012.

Irwin was without a PGA Tour win in five years and 11 years removed from his last U.S. Open victory in 1979; he received a special exemption from the USGA to enter the tournament. Irwin began the final round in a tie for 20th place, four strokes back of leaders Billy Ray Brown and Donald. Playing well ahead of the leaders, Irwin fired a round of 67, which included a 45-foot (14 m) birdie putt at the 72nd hole. After the putt dropped, he provided the championship with its enduring image as he took a "victory lap" around the green, high-fiving spectators. Irwin, however, had not won the championship yet as there were still golfers on the course with a chance to overtake him. Donald made par saves from 35 feet (11 m) on the 12th and from 15 feet (5 m) on the 14th before making bogey at the 16th. A two-putt par on the last tied him with Irwin, forcing an 18-hole Monday playoff. Brown and Nick Faldo finished a stroke out of the playoff in a tie for third place.

In the playoff, Donald took a two-shot lead to the 16th tee. Needing a birdie, Irwin responded with a brilliant 2-iron approach and sank the putt to get within one. After both players parred the 17th, Irwin made par at the last, giving Donald a chance to win the championship. His par putt, however, narrowly slid by, implementing sudden-death for the first time in U.S. Open history. (Previous playoff ties went on to play additional full rounds, the last of which was in 1946.) Irwin needed just one more hole, recording a birdie at the par-4 1st to win the championship.

At 45 years and 15 days, Irwin became the oldest winner of the U.S. Open, surpassing the record set in 1986 by Raymond Floyd by 15 months. The oldest winner of a major is Phil Mickelson, 50 at the 2021 PGA Championship.

Curtis Strange attempted to win his third consecutive U.S. Open; he began the final round just two off the lead, but a final round 75 dropped him back to 21st place. Amateurs Phil Mickelson and David Duval made their major championship debuts, finishing in 29th and 56th place, respectively.

Scoring conditions were ideal throughout the week, with a record 39 under-par rounds in the first round and 47 in the second. A total of 28 players finished the tournament under-par, a new U.S. Open record.

== Course layout ==
Hole	1	2	3	4	5	6	7	8	9	Out	10	11	12	13	14	15	16	17	18	In	Total
Yards	385	180	412	434	526	445	581	190	426	3,582	577	402	462	199	545	384	426	168	440	3,603	7,185
Par	4	3	4	4	5	4	5	3	4	36	5	4	4	3	5	4	4	3	4	36	72

== Round summaries ==
=== First round ===
Thursday, June 14, 1990

Place	Player	Score	To par
T1	(United States) Scott Simpson	66	−6
T1	(United States) Tim Simpson	66	−6
T1	(United States) Jeff Sluman	66	−6
T4	(United States) Mike Donald	67	−5
T4	(United States) Steve Jones	67	−5
T6	(United States) Mark Brooks	68	−4
T6	(United States) John Huston	68	−4
T8	(United States) Emlyn Aubrey	69	−3
T8	(United States) Billy Ray Brown	69	−3
T8	(United States) Hale Irwin	69	−3
T8	(United States) Bob Tway	69	−3

=== Second round ===
Friday, June 15, 1990

Place	Player	Score	To par
1	(United States) Tim Simpson	66-69=135	−9
2	(United States) Jeff Sluman	66-70=136	−8
3	(United States) Mike Donald	67-70=137	−7
4	(United States) Mark Brooks	68-70=138	−6
T5	(United States) Hale Irwin	69-70=139	−5
T5	(United States) Scott Simpson	66-73=139	−5
T7	(United States) Billy Ray Brown	69-71=140	−4
T7	(United States) Jim Gallagher Jr.	71-69=140	−4
T7	(United States) John Huston	68-72=140	−4
T7	(Wales) Ian Woosnam	70-70=140	−4

Amateurs: Duval (E), Mickelson (+1).

=== Third round ===
Saturday, June 16, 1990

Place	Player	Score	To par
T1	(United States) Billy Ray Brown	69-71-69=209	−7
T1	(United States) Mike Donald	67-70-72=209	−7
T3	(United States) Mark Brooks	68-70-72=210	−6
T3	(United States) Larry Nelson	74-67-69=210	−6
T3	(United States) Tim Simpson	66-69-75=210	−6
T3	(United States) Jeff Sluman	66-70-74=210	−6
T7	(United States) Larry Mize	72-70-69=211	−5
T7	(Spain) José María Olazábal	73-69-69=211	−5
T7	(Australia) Craig Parry	72-71-68=211	−5
T7	(United States) Mike Reid	70-73-68=211	−5
T7	(United States) Curtis Strange	73-70-68=211	−5
T7	(United States) Fuzzy Zoeller	73-70-68=211	−5

=== Final round ===
Sunday, June 17, 1990

Place	Player	Score	To par	Money ($)
T1	(United States) Hale Irwin	69-70-74-67=280	−8	Playoff
T1	(United States) Mike Donald	67-70-72-71=280	−8	Playoff
T3	(United States) Billy Ray Brown	69-71-69-72=281	−7	56,878
T3	(England) Nick Faldo	72-72-68-69=281	−7	56,878
T5	(United States) Mark Brooks	68-70-72-73=283	−5	33,271
T5	(Australia) Greg Norman	72-73-69-69=283	−5	33,271
T5	(United States) Tim Simpson	66-69-75-73=283	−5	33,271
T8	(United States) Scott Hoch	70-73-69-72=284	−4	22,236
T8	(United States) Steve Jones	67-76-74-67=284	−4	22,236
T8	(Spain) José María Olazábal	73-69-69-73=284	−4	22,236
T8	(United States) Tom Sieckmann	70-74-68-72=284	−4	22,236
T8	(United States) Craig Stadler	71-70-72-71=284	−4	22,236
T8	(United States) Fuzzy Zoeller	73-70-68-73=284	−4	22,236

Amateurs: Phil Mickelson (E), David Duval (+5).

==== Scorecard ====
Final round

Hole	1	2	3	4	5	6	7	8	9	10	11	12	13	14	15	16	17	18
Par	4	3	4	4	5	4	5	3	4	5	4	4	3	5	4	4	3	4
(United States) Irwin	−3	−2	−2	−2	−2	−2	−3	−3	−3	−3	−4	−5	−6	−7	−7	−7	−7	−8
(United States) Donald	−8	−9	−9	−9	−9	−9	−9	−9	−9	−9	−9	−9	−9	−9	−9	−8	−8	−8
(United States) Brown	−7	−7	−7	−7	−8	−8	−6	−7	−6	−6	−7	−7	−7	−7	−7	−6	−7	−7
(England) Faldo	−5	−5	−5	−5	−6	−6	−6	−6	−6	−6	−7	−7	−7	−8	−8	−7	−7	−7
(United States) Brooks	−6	−6	−5	−5	−5	−4	−4	−4	−5	−5	−5	−6	−5	−5	−4	−4	−5	−5
(Australia) Norman	−2	−2	−2	−2	−3	−4	−4	−5	−5	−6	−6	−6	−7	−6	−6	−6	−5	−5
(United States) Simpson	−6	−6	−6	−6	−6	−5	−5	−5	−6	−6	−6	−6	−5	−5	−5	−5	−5	−5
(United States) Nelson	−6	−6	−6	−4	−5	−3	−3	−2	−2	−2	−3	−3	−2	−1	−1	−2	−3	−3
(United States) Sluman	−6	−6	−6	−5	−4	−4	−4	−4	−4	−3	−4	−4	−4	−4	−3	−3	−3	−3

Cumulative tournament scores, relative to par

Birdie	Bogey	Double bogey

=== Playoff ===
Monday, June 18, 1990

Place	Player	Score	To par	Sudden death	Money ($)
1	(United States) Hale Irwin	38-36=74	+2	3	220,000
2	(United States) Mike Donald	37-37=74	+2	x	110,000

- Irwin and Donald tied in the 18-hole playoff at 74 (+2).
- The sudden-death playoff began on hole #1 (385 yd., par 4), which Irwin (3) birdied and Donald (x) did not.

==== Scorecard ====
Hole	1	2	3	4	5	6	7	8	9	10	11	12	13	14	15	16	17	18
Par	4	3	4	4	5	4	5	3	4	5	4	4	3	5	4	4	3	4
(United States) Irwin	E	E	E	E	+1	+1	+1	+1	+2	+2	+3	+4	+4	+3	+3	+2	+2	+2
(United States) Donald	−1	E	E	+1	+1	+2	+2	+2	+1	+1	+2	+2	+2	+1	+1	+1	+1	+2
Sudden-death Playoff
(United States) Irwin	−1																	
(United States) Donald	x																	

Birdie	Bogey
