= Wisconsin PGA Championship =

Golf tournament

The Wisconsin PGA Championship is a golf tournament that is the championship of the Wisconsin section of the PGA of America. It has been played annually since 1929 at a variety of courses in Wisconsin.

== Winners ==
- 2026 Sam Weatherhead
- 2025 David Bach
- 2024 Mick Smith
- 2023 Michael Crowley
- 2022 Jamie Christianson
- 2021 Mick Smith
- 2020 Mick Smith
- 2019 Ryan Helminen
- 2018 Joe Leonard
- 2017 Jim Schuman
- 2016 Ryan Helminen
- 2015 David Roesch
- 2014 Patrick Steffes
- 2013 Eddie Terasa
- 2012 Ryan Helminen
- 2011 Eddie Terasa
- 2010 Ryan Helminen
- 2009 Eddie Terasa
- 2008 Rick Witt
- 2007 Eddie Terasa
- 2006 Charlie Brown
- 2005 Jim Schuman
- 2004 Larry Tiziani
- 2003 Eddie Terasa
- 2002 Jim Schuman
- 2001 Jim Schuman
- 2000 Dave Spengler
- 1999 Dave Spengler
- 1998 Chad Behrends
- 1997 Bill Kokott
- 1996 Doug Sheldon
- 1995 Eddie Terasa
- 1994 Dennis Tiziani
- 1993 Eddie Terasa
- 1992 Eddie Terasa
- 1991 Eddie Terasa
- 1990 Eddie Terasa
- 1989 Bill Brodell
- 1988 Eddie Terasa
- 1987 Larry Tiziani
- 1986 Bill Brodell
- 1985 Tony Wallin
- 1984 Dennis Tiziani
- 1983 Steve Howe
- 1982 Dennis Tiziani
- 1981 Tony Wallin
- 1980 Steve Bull
- 1979 Roy Abrameit
- 1978 Bob Brue
- 1977 Bob Brue
- 1976 Dennis Tiziani
- 1975 Rolf Deming
- 1974 Bob Brue
- 1973 Bob Brue
- 1972 Steve Friebert
- 1971 Bob Swift
- 1970 Manuel de la Torre
- 1969 Eddie Langert
- 1968 Bob Brue
- 1967 Lou Warobick
- 1966 Steve Bull
- 1965 Mike Bencriscutto
- 1964 Steve Bull
- 1963 Lou Warobick
- 1962 Roy Wallin
- 1961 Mike Bencriscutto
- 1960 Steve Bull
- 1959 Manuel de la Torre
- 1958 Randy Quick
- 1957 Manuel de la Torre
- 1956 Jim Milward
- 1955 Manuel de la Torre
- 1954 Jim Milward
- 1953 Manuel de la Torre
- 1952 Butch Krueger
- 1951 Joe Frank
- 1950 George Kinsman, Jr.
- 1949 Butch Krueger
- 1948 Jim Milward
- 1947 Jim Milward
- 1946 Butch Krueger
- 1945 Hank Gardner
- 1944 Francis Gallett
- 1943 No tournament
- 1942 Francis Gallett
- 1941 Burle Gose
- 1940 Butch Krueger
- 1939 Burle Gose
- 1938 Butch Krueger
- 1937 Butch Krueger
- 1936 Butch Krueger
- 1935 Butch Krueger
- 1934 Len Gallett
- 1933 Len Gallett
- 1932 Len Gallett
- 1931 Francis Gallett
- 1930 Floyd "Red" Leonard
- 1929 Len Gallett
