= Mario Tiziani =

American professional golfer (born 1970)

Mario S. Tiziani (born July 17, 1970) is an American professional golfer.

== College career ==
Tiziani was born in Ironwood, Michigan. Playing golf for the Wisconsin Badgers, he was Big Ten Conference freshman of the year.

== Professional career ==
On his 12th attempt, Tiziani qualified for the PGA Tour. In his only full season on the PGA Tour in 2005, his best finish was T-12 at the Southern Farm Bureau Classic. He played full-time on the Nationwide Tour in 2006 and 2007, but his best result came in 2005 – tied for second at the LaSalle Bank Open.

On the Canadian Tour, he won the 2003 Northern Ontario Open and also won the 2002 Panama Open, an unofficial event.

He also won the 2002 Wisconsin State Open.

== Personal life ==
He is brother-in-law to pro golfer Steve Stricker and son of Dennis Tiziani.

== Professional wins (3) ==
=== Canadian Tour wins (1) ===
No.	Date	Tournament	Winning score	Margin of victory	Runners-up
1	Jun 29, 2003	Northern Ontario Open	−9 (69-67-67-68=271)	6 strokes	(Australia) Tony Carolan, (Australia) David McKenzie

=== Other wins (2) ===
- 2002 Wisconsin State Open, Panasonic Panama Open

== See also ==
- 2004 PGA Tour Qualifying School graduates
