= Dennis Tiziani =

American professional golfer

Dennis B. Tiziani is an American retired professional golfer and golf coach.

== Playing career ==
He spent three years on the PGA Tour, played in 12 PGA Professional National Championship, three U.S. Opens, and the 1976 PGA Championship. He finished T51st at the 1976 PGA Championship.

Tiziani won the 1976 Wisconsin State Open. He also is four-time winner of the Wisconsin PGA Championship (1976, 1982, 1984, and 1996).

== Coaching career ==
For 26 years, Tiziani was head coach for the Wisconsin Badgers men's golf team. While there he coached his son Mario Tiziani. He also coached the women's team.

== Personal life ==
He is father-in-law to PGA Tour and PGA Tour Champions Steve Stricker.

== Results in major championships ==
Tournament	1976	1977	1978	1979	1980	1981	1982	1983	1984
U.S. Open	CUT	CUT							CUT
PGA Championship	T51								

Note: Tiziani never played in the Masters Tournament nor The Open Championship.

Did not play

CUT = missed the half-way cut
"T" = tied

== U.S. national team appearances ==
- PGA Cup: 1976 (winners)
