= 2006 PGA Championship =

Coordinates: 41.966°N 88.048°W

Tournament information
- Dates: August 17–20, 2006
- Location: Medinah, Illinois
- Course(s): Medinah Country Club; No. 3 Course
- Organized by: PGA of America
- Tour(s): PGA Tour; European Tour; Japan Golf Tour

Statistics
- Par: 72
- Length: 7,561 yards (6,914 m)
- Field: 156 players, 70 after cut
- Cut: 144 (E)
- Prize fund: $6,800,000
- Winner's share: $1,224,000

Champion
- (United States) Tiger Woods
- 270 (−18)

Location in the United States
Location in Illinois

The 2006 PGA Championship was the 88th PGA Championship, played August 17–20 at Medinah Country Club in Medinah, Illinois, a suburb northwest of Chicago. Tiger Woods won his third PGA Championship and twelfth major title, five shots ahead of runner-up Shaun Micheel, the 2003 champion. It was consecutive major wins for Woods, after taking The Open Championship at Hoylake four weeks earlier.

The No. 3 Course was the longest to date in major championship history. Medinah previously hosted the tournament in 1999, when Woods captured his first PGA Championship. The purse was $6.8 million with a winner's share of $1.224 million.

This was the last appearance for two-time winner Nick Price.

== Field ==
1. All former PGA Champions
2. Winners of the last five U.S. Opens (2002–2006)
3. Winners of the last five Masters (2002–2006)
4. Winners of the last five British Opens (2002–2006)
5. The 2006 Senior PGA Champion
6. The low 15 scorers and ties in The 2005 PGA Championship
7. The 20 low scorers in The 2006 PGA Professional National Championship
8. The 70 leaders in official money standings from the 2005 International through the 2006 Buick Open
9. Members of the 2004 United States Ryder Cup Team
10. Winners of tournaments co-sponsored or approved by the PGA Tour and designated as official events from The 2005 PGA Championship to The 2006 PGA Championship. (Does not include pro-am or team competitions).
11. In addition, The PGA of America reserves the right to invite additional players not included in the categories above.
12. The 156-player field will be filled (in order) by those players below 70th place in official money standings from the 2005 International through the 2006 Buick Open.

Full eligibility list

== Course layout ==
No. 3 Course

Hole	1	2	3	4	5	6	7	8	9	Out	10	11	12	13	14	15	16	17	18	In	Total
Yards	434	191	414	463	537	474	587	204	435	3,739	579	438	471	244	605	392	453	197	443	3,822	7,561
Par	4	3	4	4	5	4	5	3	4	36	5	4	4	3	5	4	4	3	4	36	72

Previous course lengths for major championships:

- 7,401 yards (6,767 m), par 72 - 1999 PGA Championship
- 7,195 yards (6,579 m), par 72 - 1990 U.S. Open
- 7,032 yards (6,430 m), par 71 - 1975 U.S. Open
- 6,981 yards (6,383 m), par 71 - 1949 U.S. Open

== Round summaries ==
=== First round ===
Thursday, August 17, 2006

Chris Riley and Lucas Glover set the pace in round one shooting six under 66s. Tiger Woods finished the round at 69, three shots off the pace. Defending champion Phil Mickelson also shot 69. Mark Calcavecchia and Dudley Hart withdrew from the tournament.

Place	Player	Score	To par
T1	(United States) Chris Riley	66	−6
T1	(United States) Lucas Glover	66	−6
3	(United States) Billy Andrade	67	−5
T4	(Australia) Robert Allenby	68	−4
T4	(United States) Stewart Cink	68	−4
T4	(England) Luke Donald	68	−4
T4	(United States) J. J. Henry	68	−4
T4	(United States) Davis Love III	68	−4
T4	(Sweden) Henrik Stenson	68	−4
T10	(United States) Jonathan Byrd	69	−3
T10	(United States) Harrison Frazar	69	−3
T10	(United States) Fred Funk	69	−3
T10	(Spain) Sergio García	69	−3
T10	(United States) Tim Herron	69	−3
T10	(United States) Billy Mayfair	69	−3
T10	(United States) Shaun Micheel	69	−3
T10	(United States) Phil Mickelson	69	−3
T10	(Australia) Geoff Ogilvy	69	−3
T10	(England) Lee Westwood	69	−3
T10	(United States) Tiger Woods	69	−3

=== Second round ===
Friday, August 18, 2006

Four players shared the lead at the conclusion of the second round, including Tim Herron, Billy Andrade, Luke Donald and Henrik Stenson. Twenty-four players were within four strokes of the lead including Tiger Woods who shot a bogey free 68 to put himself within one shot of the leaders. Seventy players survived the 36-hole cut of even-par 144. Big names that missed the cut included: Vijay Singh, John Daly, Fred Couples, and Colin Montgomerie.

Place	Player	Score	To par
T1	(United States) Billy Andrade	67-69=136	−8
T1	(England) Luke Donald	68-68=136	−8
T1	(Sweden) Henrik Stenson	68-68=136	−8
T1	(United States) Tim Herron	69-67=136	−8
T5	(United States) Davis Love III	68-69=137	−7
T5	(Australia) Geoff Ogilvy	69-68=137	−7
T5	(United States) Tiger Woods	69-68=137	−7
T8	(United States) Fred Funk	69-69=138	−6
T8	(United States) Billy Mayfair	69-69=138	−6
T8	(United States) Chris Riley	66-72=138	−6
T8	(United States) David Toms	71-67=138	−6

=== Third round ===
Saturday, August 19, 2006

Tiger Woods matched the course record with a 7-under 65, giving him a share of the lead with Luke Donald. Mike Weir also shot 65 to sit alone in third, two shots behind the leaders. Joey Sindelar holed a 3-wood from 241 yards (220 m) on the par-5 fifth hole for a double eagle, the rarest shot in golf and only the third in PGA Championship history. It was last done by Per-Ulrik Johansson at Riviera in 1995; the first was by club pro Darrell Kestner at Inverness in 1993.

Place	Player	Score	To par
T1	(United States) Tiger Woods	69-68-65=202	−14
T1	(England) Luke Donald	68-68-66=202	−14
3	(Canada) Mike Weir	72-67-65=204	−12
4	(Australia) Geoff Ogilvy	69-68-68=205	−11
T5	(United States) Shaun Micheel	69-70-67=206	−10
T5	(Spain) Sergio García	69-70-67=206	−10
7	(South Korea) K. J. Choi	73-67-67=207	−9
T8	(United States) Chris DiMarco	71-70-67=208	−8
T8	(United States) Tim Herron	69-67-72=208	−8
T8	(United States) Phil Mickelson	69-71-68=208	−8
T8	(England) Ian Poulter	70-70-68=208	−8

=== Final round ===
Sunday, August 20, 2006

Tiger Woods moved to 12-0 in majors where he led or shared the lead after 54 holes. He bested the field by five shots to win his third PGA Championship and 12th major. Third round co-leader Luke Donald shot a two-over 74 and fell out of contention on the back nine. 2003 champion Shaun Micheel shot 69 to finish in second outright. Tiger Woods tied his record for the aggregate low score in PGA Championship history (shared with Bob May at Valhalla in 2000) at 18 strokes under-par. He also became the first ever to win the PGA twice on the same course, and the first in the era of the modern Grand Slam to win two major championships in each of two successive years. Chad Campbell shot the low round of the day, a six-under 66, to finish in a tie for 24th.

Place	Player	Score	To par	Money ($)
1	(United States) Tiger Woods	69-68-65-68=270	−18	1,224,000
2	(United States) Shaun Micheel	69-70-67-69=275	−13	734,400
T3	(England) Luke Donald	68-68-66-74=276	−12	353,600
T3	(Spain) Sergio García	69-70-67-70=276	−12	353,600
T3	(Australia) Adam Scott	71-69-69-67=276	−12	353,600
6	(Canada) Mike Weir	72-67-65-73=277	−11	244,800
T7	(South Korea) K. J. Choi	73-67-67-71=278	−10	207,788
T7	(United States) Steve Stricker	72-67-70-69=278	−10	207,788
T9	(United States) Ryan Moore	71-72-67-69=279	−9	165,000
T9	(Australia) Geoff Ogilvy	69-68-68-74=279	−9	165,000
T9	(England) Ian Poulter	70-70-68-71=279	−9	165,000

==== Scorecard ====
Final round

Hole	1	2	3	4	5	6	7	8	9	10	11	12	13	14	15	16	17	18
Par	4	3	4	4	5	4	5	3	4	5	4	4	3	5	4	4	3	4
(United States) Woods	−15	−15	−15	−15	−16	−17	−17	−18	−18	−18	−19	−19	−19	−19	−19	−19	−18	−18
(United States) Micheel	−11	−11	−11	−10	−11	−11	−11	−11	−12	−12	−13	−12	−13	−14	−14	−14	−14	−13
(England) Donald	−14	−14	−14	−13	−13	−13	−13	−13	−13	−12	−12	−12	−12	−12	−12	−12	−12	−12
(Spain) García	−10	−10	−11	−11	−12	−12	−11	−10	−11	−11	−11	−11	−10	−12	−12	−12	−12	−12
(Australia) Scott	−8	−8	−8	−8	−9	−10	−11	−11	−12	−12	−12	−12	−12	−13	−14	−13	−13	−12
(Canada) Weir	−12	−12	−13	−13	−14	−14	−14	−14	−14	−15	−14	−14	−14	−13	−13	−12	−11	−11

Cumulative tournament scores, relative to par

Eagle	Birdie	Bogey
