= 1975 U.S. Open (golf) =

Tournament information
- Dates: June 19–23, 1975
- Location: Medinah, Illinois; 41.966°N 88.048°W
- Courses: Medinah Country Club, Course No. 3
- Organized by: USGA
- Tour: PGA Tour

Statistics
- Par: 71
- Length: 7,032 yards (6,430 m)
- Field: 150 players, 67 after cut
- Cut: 149 (+7)
- Prize fund: $235,700
- Winner's share: $40,000

Champion
- (United States) Lou Graham
- 287 (+3), playoff

Location map
- Location in the United States Location in Illinois

The 1975 U.S. Open was the 75th U.S. Open, held June 19–23, at Medinah Country Club in Medinah, Illinois, a suburb northwest of Chicago. Lou Graham defeated John Mahaffey by two strokes in an 18-hole Monday playoff to win his only major championship.

Tom Watson shot 135 (−7) to tie the U.S. Open record for the first 36 holes of play, but 155 (+13) on the weekend forced him down the leaderboard, three shots out of the Graham-Mahaffey playoff. It marked the second straight year Watson failed to maintain a weekend lead in the championship; he was the 54-hole leader in 1974 at Winged Foot. He won the next major a month later in Scotland at Carnoustie.

Arnold Palmer finished in a tie for ninth place, his final top-10 finish at the U.S. Open. Jerry Pate tied for 18th place and shared low amateur honors with Jay Haas; Pate won the following year as a tour rookie.

Paired with Palmer was Masters champion Jack Nicklaus, who was two-under in the final round and just missed a birdie putt on the 15th green. He carded three consecutive bogeys to finish and ended up two strokes back. Nicklaus rebounded and won the PGA Championship in August at Firestone.

The quality of the play was generally regarded as poor. Despite the high scores Jack Nicklaus said it was the "easiest" U.S. Open he had ever remembered playing. Runner-up John Mahaffey stated at the end of the event, "This course was never as difficult as the scores looked. I agree with everybody who said it was the easiest Open in history to have won. At least 10 guys could have won it by five shots if they'd played golf." The sportswriter Dan Jenkins regularly panned the performance of the players in his Sport Illustrated cover profile, stating in his opening sentence that "it was a golf tournament that begged to be forgotten."

Since moving to the four-day format in 1965, this is the only U.S. Open in which the final round was not scheduled for Father's Day, the third Sunday in June.

This was the second U.S. Open at Medinah, the first was held in 1949. It later hosted in 1990, also a playoff, and the PGA Championship in 1999 and 2006, both won by Tiger Woods. Medinah was the venue for the Ryder Cup in 2012.

This was the final year that players were not allowed to have their own caddies at the U.S. Open. The other majors and some PGA Tour events had traditionally disallowed players from using their own caddies. The Masters required club caddies from Augusta National through 1982.

== Course layout ==
Hole	1	2	3	4	5	6	7	8	9	Out	10	11	12	13	14	15	16	17	18	In	Total
Yards	390	187	421	446	527	442	594	205	435	3,647	583	402	384	453	167	318	452	220	406	3,385	7,032
Par	4	3	4	4	5	4	5	3	4	36	5	4	4	4	3	4	4	3	4	35	71

== Round summaries ==
=== First round ===
Thursday, June 19, 1975

Place	Player	Score	To par
T1	(United States) Pat Fitzsimons	67	−4
T1	(United States) Tom Watson	67	−4
3	(United States) Jim Wiechers	68	−3
T4	(United States) Grier Jones	69	−2
T4	(England) Peter Oosterhuis	69	−2
T4	(United States) Arnold Palmer	69	−2
T4	(United States) Lanny Wadkins	69	−2
8	(United States) Ben Crenshaw	70	−1
T9	(United States) Jim Colbert	71	E
T9	(United States) Dale Douglass	71	E
T9	(United States) Marty Fleckman	71	E
T9	(Australia) David Graham	71	E
T9	(United States) Lynn Janson	71	E
T9	(United States) Rik Massengale	71	E
T9	(United States) Lance Ten Broeck (a)	71	E

=== Second round ===
Friday, June 20, 1975

Place	Player	Score	To par
1	(United States) Tom Watson	67-68=135	−7
2	(United States) Ben Crenshaw	70-68=138	−4
3	(United States) Pat Fitzsimons	67-73=140	−2
T4	(United States) Terry Dill	72-69=141	−1
T4	(United States) Lee Trevino	72-69=141	−1
T4	(United States) Jim Wiechers	68-73=141	−1
T7	(United States) Grier Jones	69-73=142	E
T7	(United States) Jack Nicklaus	72-70=142	E
T7	(England) Peter Oosterhuis	69-73=142	E
T10	(United States) Frank Beard	74-69=143	+1
T10	(United States) Jay Haas (a)	74-69=143	+1

=== Third round ===
Saturday, June 21, 1975

Place	Player	Score	To par
1	(United States) Frank Beard	74-69-67=210	−3
T2	(United States) Pat Fitzsimons	67-73-73=213	E
T2	(United States) Tom Watson	67-68-78=213	E
T4	(United States) Ben Crenshaw	70-68-76=214	+1
T4	(United States) Lou Graham	74-72-68=214	+1
T4	(England) Peter Oosterhuis	69-73-72=214	+1
T7	(United States) Hubert Green	74-69-72=215	+2
T7	(United States) Jay Haas (a)	74-69-72=215	+2
T7	(United States) Joe Inman	72-72-71=215	+2
T10	(United States) Miller Barber	74-71-71=216	+3
T10	(United States) John Mahaffey	73-71-72=216	+3
T10	(United States) Rik Massengale	71-74-71=216	+3
T10	(United States) Eddie Pearce	75-71-70=216	+3
T10	(United States) Lee Trevino	72-69-75=216	+3

=== Final round ===
Sunday, June 22, 1975

Frank Beard began the final round with a three-stroke lead, four over Graham and six ahead of Mahaffey. But after bogeys at 16 and 17, he staggered home with a 78 (+7) to finish a shot behind. Mahaffey holed a 40-foot (12 m) putt for birdie at 14, then parred out the rest of the way to post an even-par 71 and 287 total. Graham went to the 18th with a one-stroke lead and a chance to win in regulation, but he hit his approach into a bunker and failed to save par and fell into a tie with Mahaffey. Several other players had an opportunity to join the playoff. Bob Murphy was tied until a bogey at 18 dropped him a shot out of the playoff, and Ben Crenshaw found the water on 17 and also finished a stroke out, as did defending champion Hale Irwin. Second round leader Tom Watson had another difficult day and fell into a tie for ninth. Jack Nicklaus bogeyed the last three holes and finished two strokes out of the playoff.

Place	Player	Country	Score	To par	Money ($)
T1	Lou Graham	United States	74-72-68-73=287	+3	Playoff
T1	John Mahaffey	United States	73-71-72-71=287	+3	Playoff
T3	Frank Beard	United States	74-69-67-78=288	+4	10,875
T3	Ben Crenshaw	United States	70-68-76-74=288	+4	10,875
T3	Hale Irwin	United States	74-71-73-70=288	+4	10,875
T3	Bob Murphy	United States	74-73-72-69=288	+4	10,875
T7	Jack Nicklaus	United States	72-70-75-72=289	+5	7,500
T7	Peter Oosterhuis	England	69-73-72-75=289	+5	7,500
T9	Pat Fitzsimons	United States	67-73-73-77=290	+6	5,000
T9	Arnold Palmer	United States	69-75-73-73=290	+6	5,000
T9	Tom Watson	United States	67-68-78-77=290	+6	5,000

==== Scorecard ====
Hole	1	2	3	4	5	6	7	8	9	10	11	12	13	14	15	16	17	18
Par	4	3	4	4	5	4	5	3	4	5	4	4	4	3	4	4	3	4
(United States) Graham	E	+1	+1	E	E	E	E	+1	+1	+2	+2	+2	+3	+2	+2	+2	+2	+3
(United States) Mahaffey	+3	+4	+4	+4	+3	+4	+4	+4	+4	+3	+3	+3	+4	+3	+3	+3	+3	+3
(United States) Beard	−3	−2	−2	−2	−2	−1	E	+1	+1	+1	+1	+2	+2	+2	+2	+3	+4	+4
(United States) Crenshaw	+1	+1	+1	+1	E	+1	+1	+1	+1	+1	+1	+1	+2	+2	+2	+2	+4	+4
(United States) Irwin	+4	+4	+4	+4	+3	+2	+2	+2	+3	+4	+4	+4	+4	+3	+3	+4	+4	+4
(United States) Murphy	+6	+6	+6	+6	+5	+6	+6	+5	+5	+4	+4	+4	+5	+5	+4	+3	+3	+4
(United States) Nicklaus	+3	+4	+4	+4	+3	+3	+3	+3	+2	+2	+2	+2	+2	+2	+2	+3	+4	+5
(England) Oosterhuis	+1	+1	+2	+2	+1	+1	+1	+1	+2	+3	+4	+5	+5	+5	+5	+5	+5	+5

Cumulative tournament scores, relative to par

Birdie	Bogey	Double bogey

=== Playoff ===
Monday, June 23, 1975

Graham jumped out to an early advantage in the playoff, recording birdies at 4, 5, and 10 en route to a 71 and a two-stroke win over Mahaffey.

Place	Player	Country	Score	To par	Money ($)
1	Lou Graham	United States	71	E	40,000
2	John Mahaffey	United States	73	+2	20,000

==== Scorecard ====
Hole	1	2	3	4	5	6	7	8	9	10	11	12	13	14	15	16	17	18
Par	4	3	4	4	5	4	5	3	4	5	4	4	4	3	4	4	3	4
(United States) Graham	E	E	+1	E	−1	−1	−1	−1	−1	−2	−2	−2	−2	−1	−1	−1	E	E
(United States) Mahaffey	E	+1	+1	+1	+1	+1	+1	+1	+1	+1	+1	+1	+1	+1	+1	+2	+2	+2
