= Wisconsin State Open =

Open golf tournament

The Wisconsin State Open is the Wisconsin state open golf tournament, open to both amateur and professional golfers. It is organized by the Wisconsin section of the PGA of America. It has been played annually since 1919 at courses in the state. It was considered a PGA Tour event in the mid-1930s.

== Winners ==
- 1919 Arthur Clarkson
- 1920 Arthur Clarkson
- 1921 Jimmy Mason
- 1922 W.R. Lovekin
- 1923 Neil McIntyre
- 1924 Jack Blakeslee
- 1925 Jack Blakeslee
- 1926 Adolph Bock (a)
- 1927 Francis Gallett
- 1928 Frank Walsh
- 1929 John Bird
- 1930 Johnny Revolta
- 1931 Johnny Revolta
- 1932 Francis Gallett
- 1933 Francis Gallett
- 1934 Johnny Revolta
- 1935 Johnny Revolta
- 1936 Butch Krueger
- 1937 Jim Milward (a)
- 1938 Jim Milward
- 1939 Francis Gallett
- 1940 Butch Krueger
- 1941 Hank Gardner
- 1942 Francis Gallett
- 1943–1944 No tournament
- 1945 Floyd Leonard
- 1946 Jim Milward
- 1947 Jim Milward
- 1948 Tom Veech (a)
- 1949 Butch Krueger
- 1950 George Kinsman, Jr.
- 1951 Billy Milward (a)
- 1952 Manuel de la Torre
- 1953 Manuel de la Torre
- 1954 Walter Porterfield
- 1955 Manuel de la Torre
- 1956 Tom Veech
- 1957 Tom Veech
- 1958 Bob Brue (a)
- 1959 Bob Brue (a)
- 1960 Tom Puls
- 1961 Manuel de la Torre
- 1962 Tommy Veech
- 1963 Bob Brue
- 1964 Steve Bull
- 1965 Eddie Davis
- 1966 Eddie Davis
- 1967 Steve Bull
- 1968 Manuel de la Torre
- 1969 John Toepel, Jr.
- 1970 Bob Brue
- 1971 Ralph Schlicht
- 1972 Bob Brue
- 1973 Rolf Deming
- 1974 Mark Bemowski (a)
- 1975 Rick Rasmussen (a)
- 1976 Dennis Tiziani
- 1977 Rolf Deming
- 1978 Larry Tiziani
- 1979 Walter Porterfield
- 1980 Roy Abrameit
- 1981 Bill Kokott
- 1982 Allen Christ (a)
- 1983 Mike Muranyi
- 1984 Greg Dick
- 1985 Eddie Terasa
- 1986 Bill Brodell
- 1987 Steve Stricker (a)
- 1988 Skip Kendall
- 1989 Skip Kendall
- 1990 Steve Stricker
- 1991 Steve Stricker
- 1992 Jerry Kelly
- 1993 Dave Miley
- 1994 Ben Walter
- 1995 Eddie Terasa
- 1996 Jim Schuman
- 1997 Ben Walter
- 1998 Steve Stricker
- 1999 Jim Schuman
- 2000 Steve Stricker
- 2001 Mark Wilson
- 2002 Mario Tiziani
- 2003 Jon Turcott (a)
- 2004 David Roesch
- 2005 Ben Walter
- 2006 Jon Turcott
- 2007 Dan Woltman (a)
- 2008 Ryan Helminen
- 2009 Dan Woltman (a)
- 2010 Eddie Terasa
- 2011 Jordan Niebrugge (a)
- 2012 Andrew Steinhofer
- 2013 Jim Lemon
- 2014 Ryan Helminen
- 2015 Kyle Henning
- 2016 Jordan Elsen
- 2017 Maxwell Hosking
- 2018 Dan Woltman
- 2019 Dan Woltman
- 2020 Harrison Ott (a)
- 2021 Harrison Ott (a)
- 2022 Daniel Mazziotta
- 2023 Cameron Huss (a)
- 2024 Max Lyons (a)
- 2025 Sam Weatherhead
- 2026 Kaylor Steger

(a) denotes amateur
