= Medinah Country Club =

Country club and golf course in Illinois, United States

Coordinates: 41.966°N 88.048°W

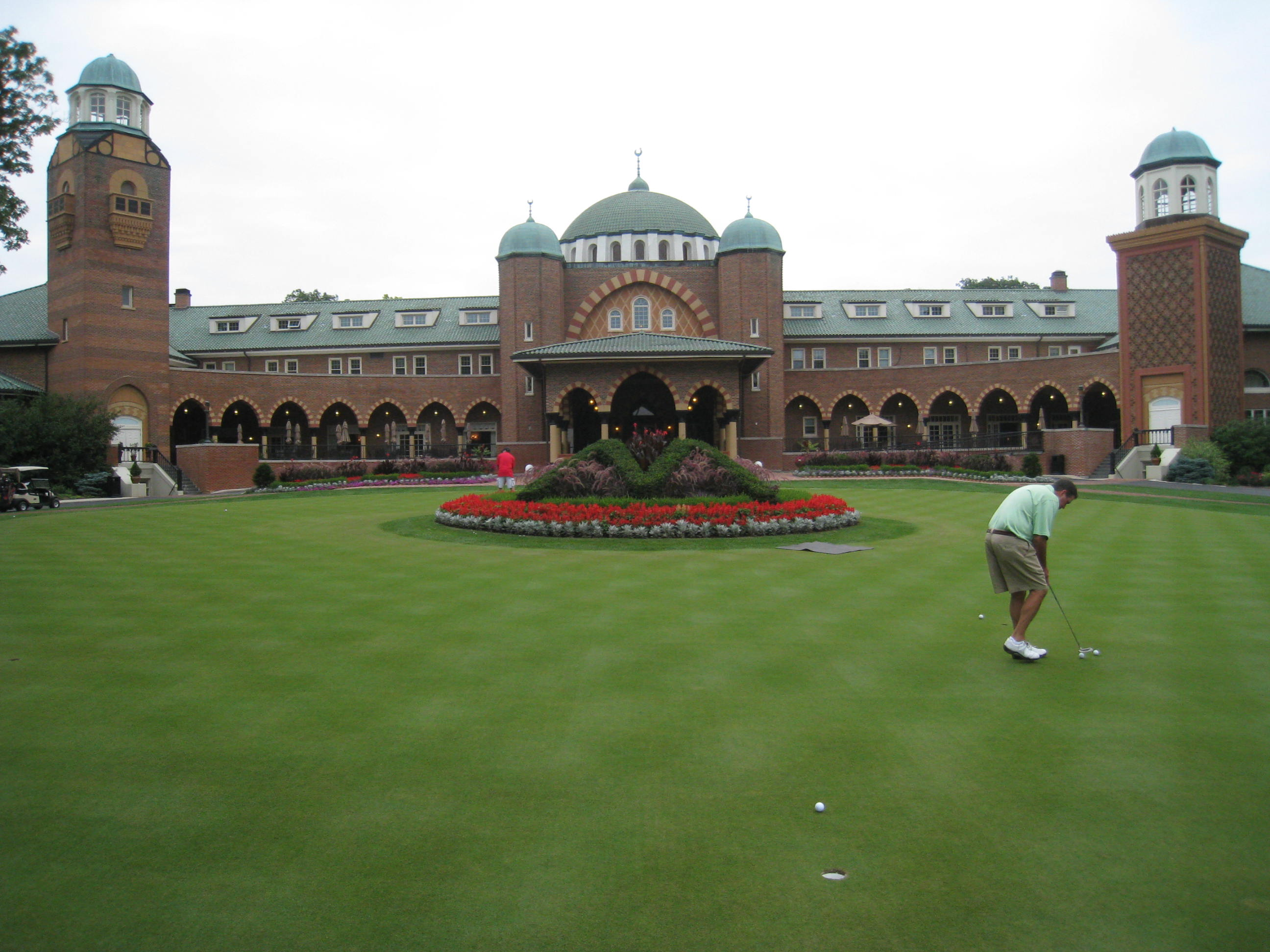
- The clubhouse and putting green (2008)
- Interactive map of Medinah Country Club

Club information
- Location: Medinah, Illinois, U.S.
- Elevation: 750 feet (230 m) AMSL
- Established: 1924; 102 years ago
- Type: Private
- Total holes: 54
- Tournaments: Ryder Cup: (2012); PGA Championship: (1999, 2006); U.S. Open: (1949, 1975, 1990); U.S. Senior Open: (1988); Western Open: (1939, 1962, 1966)
- Website: www.medinahcc.org

Golf Course 1
- Designed by: Tom Bendelow
- Par: 71
- Length: 6,713 yards (6,138 m)
- Course rating: 73.2
- Slope rating: 134

Golf Course 2
- Designed by: Tom Bendelow
- Par: 72
- Length: 6,210 yards (5,678 m)
- Course rating: 70.1
- Slope rating: 126

Golf Course 3
- Designed by: Tom Bendelow
- Par: 72
- Length: 7,657 yards (7,002 m)
- Course rating: 78.3
- Slope rating: 152
- Course record: 61 - Justin Thomas (2019)
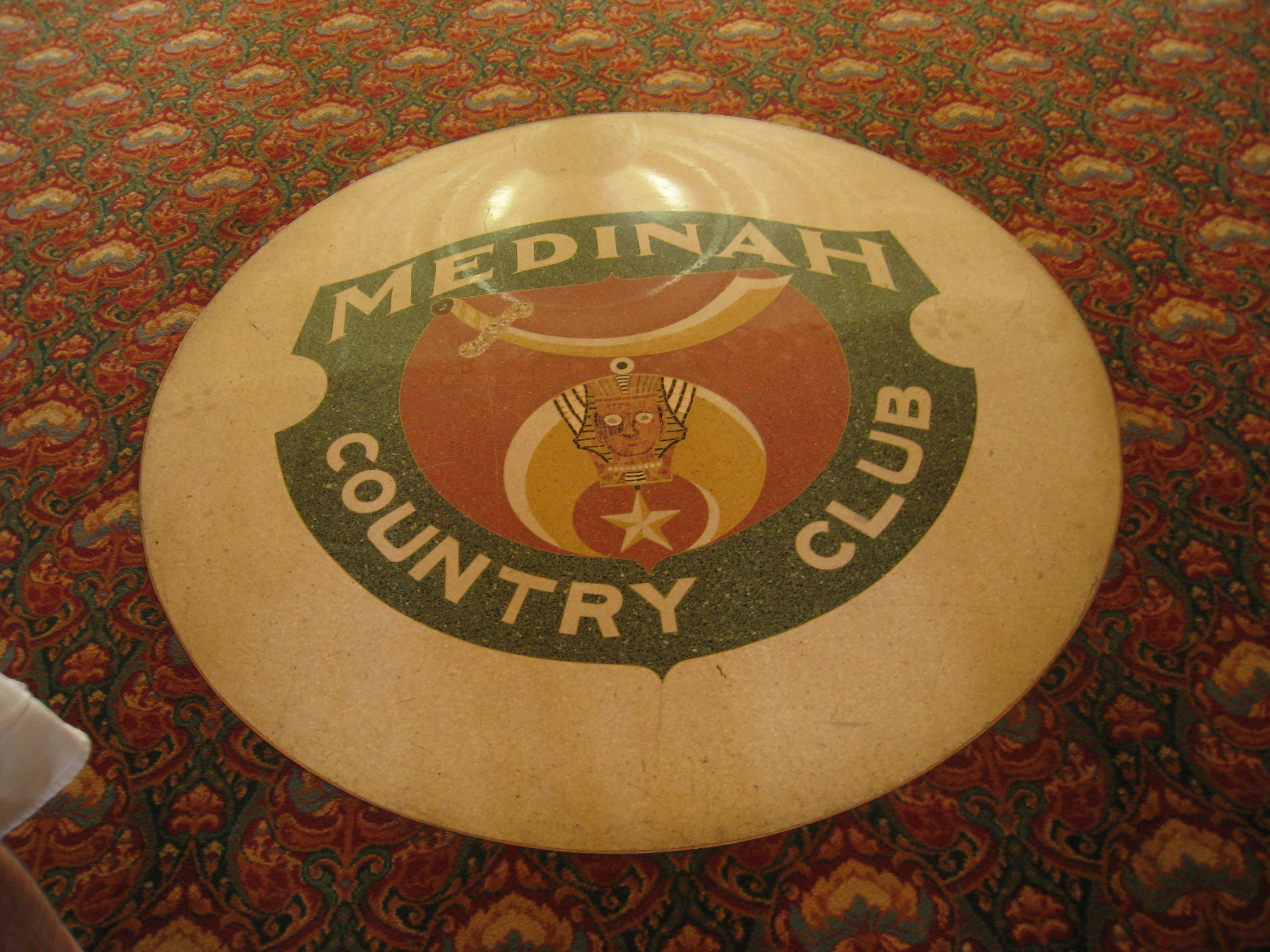
- Club Logo

Medinah Country Club is a private country club in Medinah, Illinois, a suburb northwest of downtown Chicago. It has more than 1,100 members and 640 acres (2.6 km^{2}) containing three golf courses, Lake Kadijah, swimming facilities, a golf learning center, golf shop, gun club, racquet center and a mosque-evoking Byzantine-style, Moroccan domed clubhouse topped with minarets and classic Moorish architectural aspects.

Medinah is famously known for its championship Course No. 3, now at 7,657 yards (7,002 m), which has hosted five major championships: three U.S. Opens (1949, 1975, 1990) and two PGA Championships (1999, 2006), as well as the Ryder Cup in 2012. The 2026 Presidents Cup was held there September 24 to 27.

== Early history ==
The club was founded in 1924 by the Medinah Shriners, who were named after Medina, the city generally considered to be the "cradle of Islamic culture and civilization". By the late 1920s the club had approximately 1,500 golfing and social members. The first golf course was opened in September 1925, followed by Course No. 2 in 1926, and finally Course No. 3 in 1928. During the construction of the courses, Richard G. Schmid, a Shriner and charter member of the club, had designed the clubhouse itself The Great Depression brought severe financial hardship and many members left. 94 members paid $3,500, each for a “forever” membership for their family forever aka Perpetual, allowing the club to continue on. In addition, the club responded by waiving initiation fees, lowering dues, holding fundraising events, and (significantly) hosting professional golf tournaments. Eventually, non-Shriners were allowed to apply for membership. World War II exacerbated the club's financial woes and membership fell far below capacity. Course No. 2 was closed and members helped with upkeep on the two remaining courses. During the post war era, Medinah entered a period of gradual recovery and membership growth. The Duke of York once visited the club and remarked, "I've never seen such a place, it is quite strange, yet attractive."

== Golf ==
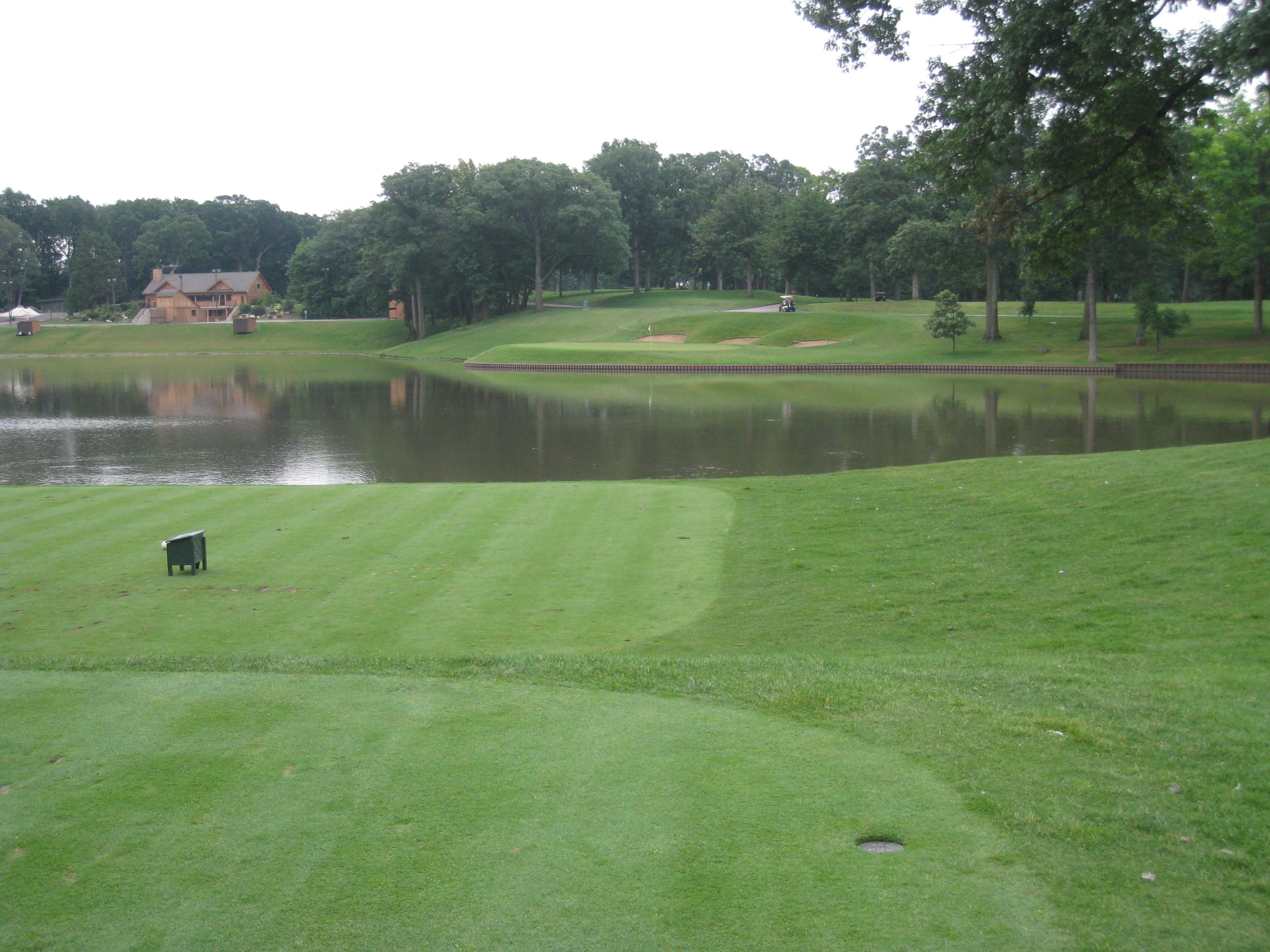
The 2nd hole is 191 yards (175 m).

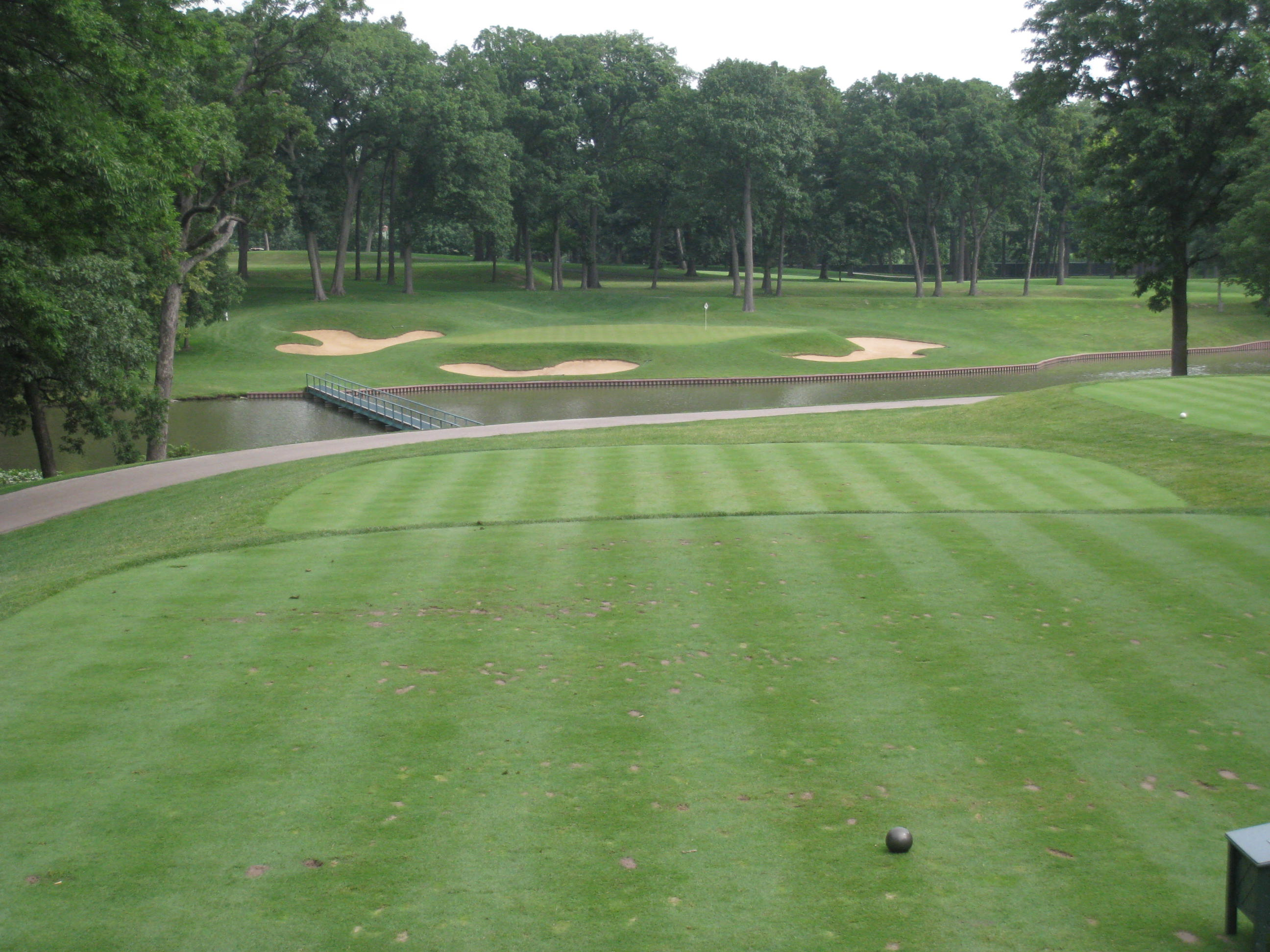
The 13th hole is 244 yards (223 m).

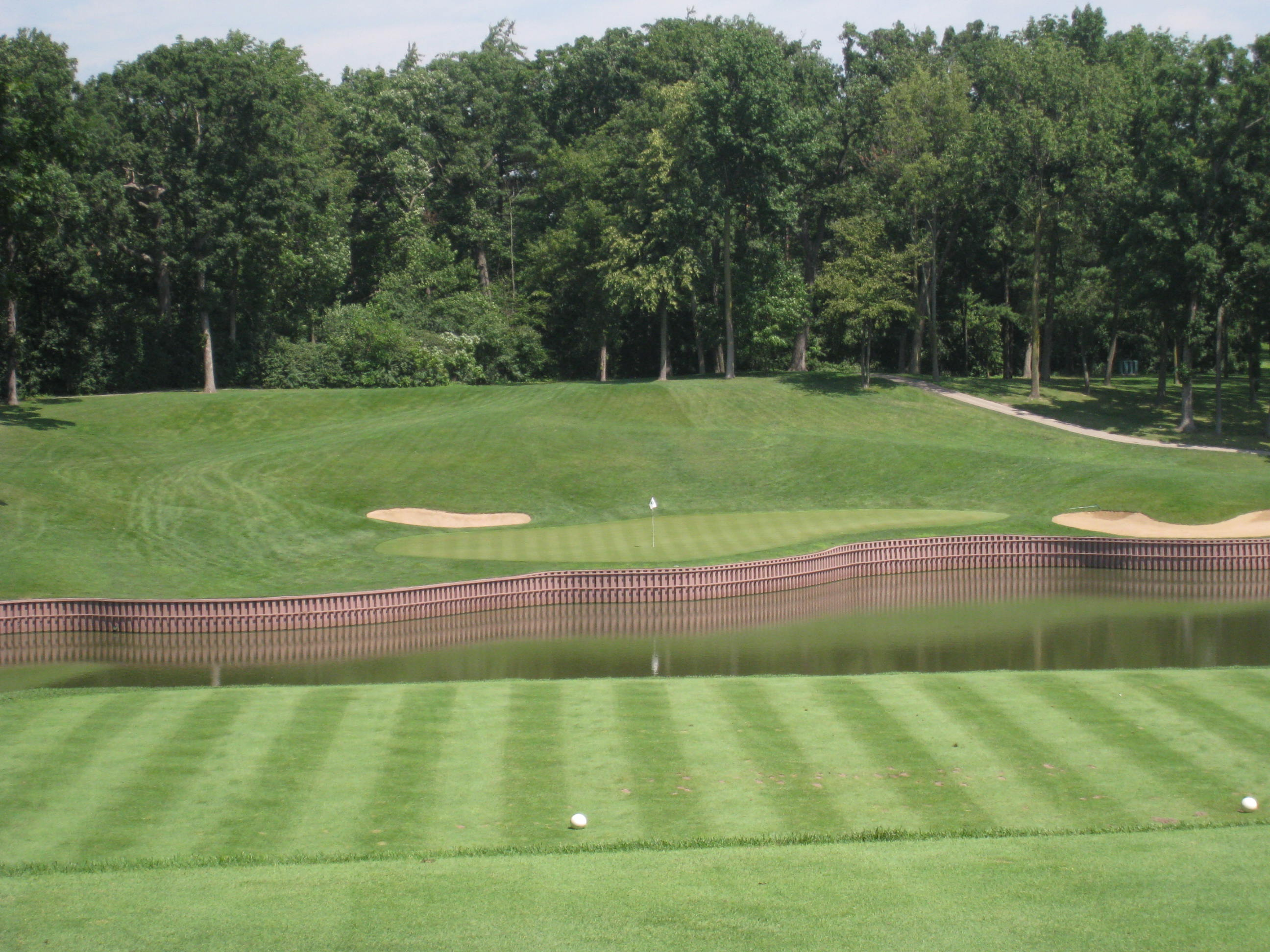
The 17th hole is 197 yards (180 m).

=== Course No. 3 ===
Medinah has three golf courses in a 54-hole complex. Many noted golf professionals have played Course No. 3, beginning with "Lighthorse" Harry Cooper at the Medinah Open in 1930. Other noted players include Gene Sarazen, Byron Nelson, Cary Middlecoff, Billy Casper, Gary Player, Hale Irwin and Tiger Woods. Tommy Armour, winner of multiple major championships and the namesake of a well-known golfing equipment brand, was Medinah's head pro for many years. Course No. 3 hosted the Western Open three times in 1939, 1962, and 1966; it was one of the largest non-major tournaments on the early tour.

Medinah's courses were originally designed by Tom Bendelow. In the 1930 Medinah Open, Lighthorse Harry played the course with a 63 (the lowest score ever shot on the course) in the second round. The junior course record of 68 is jointly held by Russell Katz and Kenny Wittenberg. Medinah's board approved a redesign of the course, subject to the availability of funds and the return of adjacent land to the club by Medinah's four founders. The major redesign was followed by several more changes. Roger Packard's 1986 redesign in preparation for the U.S. Open brought substantial changes and was followed by Rees Jones' work in preparation for the 2006 PGA Championship, which extended Course 3 to 7,561 yards (6,914 m), at the time, the longest golf course in major championship history. Furthermore, Medinah Country Club is noted for the three waterfront par three holes in numbers 2, 13, and 17.

Medinah's Course No. 3 hosted the BMW Championship on August 15–18, 2019. during which the course record was tied or set four different times. In round 1, both Justin Thomas and Jason Kokrak shot 65, tying the course record previously set by Skip Kendall, Mike Weir and Tiger Woods. On Friday, Hideki Matsuyama broke the record by two shots, shooting a bogey-free 63. In the third round on Saturday, after starting with five consecutive birdies, Thomas shot an 11-under 61, including two eagles, breaking the course record again by two shots.

In advance of the 2026 Presidents Cup, the club chose to remake the No. 3 course and turned to a design firm founded by 2006 US Open champion Geoff Ogilvy. The remake transformed the No 3. course into one in the style of Melbourne Sand Belt courses.

=== 2012 Ryder Cup ===
Medinah hosted the Ryder Cup in 2012, its first time in the state of Illinois, and the first U.S. venue outside the eastern time zone since 1971. The full tournament took place between September 25–30 (including pre-match competitions, press conferences and media activities), with the main competition taking place from September 28–30 on Course No. 3.

== Major tournaments hosted ==
All held on Course No. 3:

Year	Tournament	Winner	Margin of victory	Winner's share ($)	Par	Course length
**1949**	U.S. Open	(United States) Cary Middlecoff	1 stroke	2,000	71	6,981 yd (6,383 m)
**1975**	U.S. Open	(United States) Lou Graham	2 strokes (90 holes)	40,000	71	7,032 yd (6,430 m)
1988	U.S. Senior Open	(South Africa) Gary Player	2 strokes (90 holes)	65,000	72	6,881 yd (6,292 m)
**1990**	U.S. Open (3)	(United States) Hale Irwin	1 stroke (91 holes)	220,000	72	7,195 yd (6,579 m)
**1999**	PGA Championship	(United States) Tiger Woods	1 stroke	630,000	72	7,401 yd (6,767 m)
**2006**	PGA Championship (2)	(United States) Tiger Woods	5 strokes	1,224,000	72	7,561 yd (6,914 m)
2012	Ryder Cup	Team Europe	1 point (14½–13½)	—N/a	72	7,657 yd (7,002 m)
2026	Presidents Cup	(United States) Team USA	4 points (17–13)	—N/a	70	7,548 yd (6,902 m)

- **Bolded years** are major championships on the PGA Tour.
- 90 holes denotes the winning margin after a playoff of 18 holes.
- 91 holes denotes a sudden-death playoff was used following a tie in the 18-hole playoff.

== Scorecard ==
Medinah Country Club - Course 3
Tee	Rating/Slope	1	2	3	4	5	6	7	8	9	Out	10	11	12	13	14	15	16	17	18	In	Total
Gold	78.3 / 152	433	192	412	463	536	509	617	201	432	3795	578	440	476	245	609	390	482	193	449	3862	7657
Silver	75.3 / 147	383	172	386	432	503	454	585	177	415	3507	567	389	463	189	550	331	434	156	421	3500	7007
White	73.6 / 142	357	151	365	401	488	432	571	153	397	3315	555	374	452	151	531	308	413	132	398	3314	6629
Par		4	3	4	4	5	4	5	3	4	36	5	4	4	3	5	4	4	3	4	36	72
SI		13	15	11	3	9	7	1	17	5		2	12	8	16	4	14	6	18	10

== Amenities ==
The club offers various amenities to its members apart from the three golf courses. For example, the clubhouse features six different member dining areas. The Golf Shop is a 3000 sq. ft. building separate from the main clubhouse. The shop includes golf apparel, accessories, and equipment. The Racquet Center has a total of eight tennis courts, four of which are platform courts. The building also features indoor seating arrangements and a firepit.
