= Wisconsin Golf Hall of Fame =

The Wisconsin State Golf Association (WSGA) established a Wisconsin Golf Hall of Fame in 1964 to honor distinguished amateurs for their significant contributions to the game of golf in Wisconsin. The five charter members of this elite group, all "legends" who made their "mark" in Wisconsin amateur golf circles, were E.P. "Ned" Allis, Dick Cavanagh, Lynford Lardner, Billy Sixty, Sr., and Wilford Wehrle.

In 1975, the WSGA Hall of Fame Committee changed the induction policies to allow professionals, women and public links players to be considered for the Hall of Fame. The first female to be inducted was Joyce Ziske Malison. In 1980, Archie Dadian of Whitnall Park GC became the first public links player to be elected to the Hall of Fame.

At present, plaques of all inductees, which outline their achievements along with an engraved likeness, are on display at Golf House of Wisconsin in West Allis.

The WSGA Hall of Fame Committee is composed of WSGA directors, golf professionals, women representatives, public links players and media delegates, who meet annually to review candidates. Candidate consideration is extended to individuals with outstanding golf records, and to those who have made exceptional contributions to the game of golf. All candidates must be at least 40 years of age and must receive at least 75% of the committee's votes.

== Members ==
- 1964 - E.P. “Ned” Allis
- 1964 - Billy Sixty, Sr.
- 1964 - Wilford Werhle
- 1964 - Lynford Lardner, Jr.
- 1964 - R.P. “Dick” Cavanagh
- 1965 - Marue Carroll
- 1965 - Dr. Adolph C. “Buster” Bock
- 1965 - Bernard “Ben” Gleissner
- 1966 - Walter H. Gaedke
- 1966 - Daniel P. Steinberg, Jr.
- 1966 - Dr. Ernest Miller
- 1966 - James R. Anderson
- 1967 - Steve Caravello
- 1967 - Ray Billows
- 1967 - Gordon Kummer
- 1968 - Frank Woodside
- 1968 - Robert Crichton
- 1968 - Harry Simonson
- 1969 - Max Shimon
- 1969 - Carl E. Dietze
- 1969 - Robert A. Hipke
- 1970 - Bowden Davis
- 1970 - Burleigh Jacobs, Jr.
- 1970 - Edward J. Walsh
- 1975 - Manuel de la Torre
- 1975 - Francis Gallett
- 1975 - Joyce Ziske Malison
- 1975 - Johnny Revolta
- 1976 - Alvin R. "Butch" Krueger
- 1977 - Walter Leuenberger
- 1977 - James "Jimmy" Milward
- 1978 - Robert A. "Bobby" Brue
- 1979 - James R. Love, Jr.
- 1979 - Thomas "Tommy" Veech
- 1980 - Archie Dadian
- 1981 - Goldie Bateson
- 1981 - Mike Bencriscutto
- 1982 - Burns O. "Blackie" Nelthorpe
- 1982 - Gordon Watson
- 1983 - Carol Sorenson Flenniken
- 1983 - Steve Bull
- 1984 - Paula (Clauder) Garzotto
- 1985 - Oyvind Juul "O.J." Noer
- 1986 - Richard J. "Dick" Sucher
- 1988 - Don Iverson
- 1989 - Dennis Tiziani
- 1990 - Mary Mcmillin Fossum
- 1990 - Andy North
- 1991 - Gene Haas
- 1991 - Mark Bemowski
- 1992 - Alex Antonio
- 1992 - John M. Hayes
- 1993 - Katie (Ahern) Falk
- 1993 - Marilyn (Klumb) Williams
- 1994 - Mary Beth Nienhaus
- 1994 - Jeffrey Radder
- 1995 - Martha Nause
- 1997 - John Pallin
- 1999 - Carol Jean Sorenson Templin
- 2000 - Lou Warobick
- 2001 - George Hansen
- 2001 - Bernice Wall
- 2002 - Ralph "Butch" Schlicht
- 2002 - Bill Brodell
- 2003 - Mary Hafeman
- 2003 - Eddie Terasa
- 2004 - Herbert Kohler, Jr.
- 2004 - Bob Gregorski
- 2004 - Sherri Steinhauer
- 2005 - Gary Menzel
- 2005 - Monroe Miller
- 2006 - J. P. Hayes
- 2006 - David U. Cookson
- 2006 - Skip Kendall
- 2007 - Steve Stricker
- 2007 - Jerry Kelly
- 2008 - Don Johnson
- 2009 - Larry Tiziani
- 2009 - Jim Schuman
- 2010 - Pat Boyle
- 2011 - Tom Schmidt
- 2011 - Arnold Walker
- 2012 - David Miley
- 2012 - Sydney Wells
- 2013 - Tom Strong
- 2014 - Greg Dick
- 2015 - Mark Wilson
- 2015 - Joellyn Crooks
- 2016 - Sue Ginter
- 2016 - David Roesch
- 2017 - Gary D'Amato
- 2017 - Ryan Helminen
- 2017 - Maggie Leef
- 2019 - Ryan Quinn
- 2019 - Rich Tock
- 2019 - Ben Walter
- 2021 - Mike Muranyi
- 2021 - Jim Reinhart
- 2022 - Carolyn Barnett-Howe
- 2022 - Frances Hadfield
- 2022 - John Jenson
- 2023 - Jim Lemon
- 2023 - Jon Turcott
