= Manuel de la Torre (golfer) =

American professional golfer (1921–2016)

Manuel de la Torre - 2008

Manuel de la Torre (6 October 1921 – 24 April 2016) was an American professional golfer and golf instructor. He is recognized as being one of golf's top teachers. His career includes playing competitively on tour, head golf professional at Milwaukee Country Club one of America's most esteemed golf clubs, and a career of teaching both tour professional and amateur golfers. Among the tour professionals he has taught are Masters champion Tommy Aaron, U.S. Women's Open champion Carol Mann, du Maurier Classic champion Martha Nause and Women's British Open champion Sherri Steinhauer. He was the first member of the PGA to be awarded their Teacher of the Year Award in 1986. He is one of only several golf instructors to be inducted into both the World Golf Teachers Hall of Fame as well as the PGA Hall of Fame.

At Northwestern University, he was captain of the golf team and runner-up in the 1942 NCAA Championship. De la Torre won numerous golf tournaments, including the Wisconsin State Open five times and the Wisconsin PGA Professional Championship five times. He was elected to the Wisconsin Golf Hall of Fame in 1975. In 1999 he was inducted into the Northwestern University Athletic Hall of Fame.

== Teaching origins ==
De la Torre was born in his parents' apartment above the golf shop at the Real Club de la Puerta de Hierro in Madrid, Spain, where his father Ángel de la Torre was the head golf professional. Angel was five-time Spanish National Golf Champion. Manuel's father's instruction and that of his father's friend and colleague Ernest Jones, served as the basis for de la Torre's instruction. His concepts for golf instruction have stood the test of time over 60 years he taught and continued to be employed by golf instructors. He retired as head golf professional at Milwaukee Country Club at which he continued to teach amateurs and tour professionals.

== Alternative approach ==
Golf instruction can be divided into two approaches. That which constitutes more than 90% of today's golf instruction is body-focused. The central premise of this type of golf instruction is built around the idea that if the golfer learns to correctly move various body parts (hips, legs, shoulders, etc.) the result will be a movement of the golf club that will produce effective golf shots. That which constitutes the other 10% of golf instruction is club-focused. Its central premise is that the golfer should instead focus on learning how the golf club should move during an effective swing. De la Torre has devoted his career to refining and teaching this club-focused approach to both golfers and instructors.

The difference between these two approaches may seem minor at first consideration. However, any student (or instructor) who has experienced both will immediately appreciate the simplicity of de la Torre's golf instruction which is unique among the leading golf instructors. De la Torre brings to light the absurdity of thinking that the cause of a poor shot is related to what your body is doing (e.g. Hips are too fast, arms are too slow, shoulder turn is off plane, etc.) He correctly observes that if the club is moving correctly, there is nothing you can do with your body that produce a poor shot. Conversely, if the club is moving incorrectly, there is nothing you can do with your body that will correct the problem and avoid the poor shot. By way of analogy, regardless of what he does with his body, if the marksman does the right thing with the rifle, the bullet must hit the target. If the golfer does the right thing with the golf club, the ball must go to the target.

Not only does this approach identify and deal with the single factor that determines the outcome of each shot (i.e. the movement of the golf club), it enables the golf instruction to be highly simplified. For beginners, this means golf is far more comprehendible and achievable. For experienced golfers, his instruction has been a relief from their frustrating efforts to manage the many parts of the body and therefore a lifting of the unnecessary burden carried by too many golfers. For tour professionals, this simplicity enables a more manageable swing that better withstands the pressures of competition. He therefore has made a life's career and many satisfied clients by diagnosing and then fixing the motion of the club. Body-focused instruction is problematic because:

- no two golfers' bodies are exactly alike,
- it asks golfers to consciously control body motions that are by their nature unconsciously controlled,
- it asks the golfer to address too many things during the 2.5 seconds required for a golf swing, and
- demands that all body motions be correct in order to achieve the desired result.

By contrast, club-focused instruction teaches:

- how the club moves for an effective swing,
- the club's movement is universal for every player and every club, and
- a lesson simple enough to accomplish during those same 2.5 seconds.

The club-focused instruction long advocated by de la Torre and Ernest Jones prior to him has now been validated by new research performed by Dr. Gabriele Wulf at the University of Las Vegas and by Dr. Bob Christina at the University of North Carolina. In their studies players of all skill levels improved faster when given club-focused instruction."It has been recognized that the golf club is a tool and humans are remarkable in their use of tools (hammer, scissors, scalpel, knife, tooth brush, etc.). With none of these, or any other tools, does a person attend to how the body is used. The body action is a subconscious physical response to the user's conscious mental intention."

== Death ==
De la Torre died on 24 April 2016 at his home in Milwaukee, Wisconsin from complications of a stroke, age 94.

== Publication ==
- De la Torre, Manuel (September 2001). Understanding the Golf Swing. Warde Publishers, Inc. ISBN 1-886346-51-8.
- De la Torre, Manuel (September 2003). Understanding the Golf Swing-DVD. Warde Publishers, Inc. ISBN 1-886346-52-6.

== Tournament wins ==
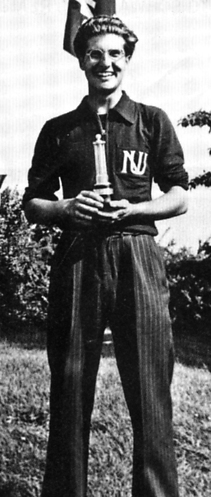
1942 NCAA Championship

Prior to his victories as a professional, he played for Highland Park High School in 1940 and was individual state golf champion. He led the Giants to the school’s first state team title. Playing for Northwestern University in 1942 he was runner-up in the NCAA Championship.

To put the following professional victories in context, these wins were accomplished while working full-time (50+ hours weekly) as a club professional. While de la Torre competed in and placed in the top ten in various tour events, he was only able to play in those that were scheduled during the off-season of the country club at which he was engaged. This meant that the only tournaments available to him were those scheduled between October and April. De la Torre competed both in the U.S. tour and in the Caribbean tour (Mexico, South America, and the Caribbean Islands).

- 1952 Wisconsin State Open
- 1953 Wisconsin State Open, Wisconsin PGA Championship
- 1954 Capital Times Invitational
- 1955 Wisconsin State Open, Wisconsin PGA Championship
- 1957 Wisconsin PGA Championship
- 1959 Wisconsin PGA Championship
- 1961 Wisconsin State Open
- 1963 Cherryland Open Championship
- 1964 Cherryland Open Championship
- 1965 Hope of Tomorrow Championship
- 1968 Wisconsin State Open
- 1970 Wisconsin PGA Championship
- 1972 Westview Invitational
- 1973 National Open Seniors Classic
- 1976 Wisconsin PGA Match Play Championship
- 1987 Wisconsin PGA Senior Championship
