= Skip Kendall =

American professional golfer (born 1964)

Personal information
- Full name: Jules Ira Kendall
- Nickname: Skip
- Nationality: United States
- Born: September 9, 1964 (age 62) Milwaukee, Wisconsin, U.S.
- Height: 5 ft 8 in (1.73 m)
- Weight: 150 lb (68 kg; 11 st)
- Spouse: TRaci
- Children: 3

Career
- Sport: Golf
- College: University of Nevada, Las Vegas
- Turned professional: 1987
- Current tour: PGA Tour Champions
- Former tours: PGA Tour; Web.com Tour
- Professional wins: 6
- Highest ranking: 69 (August 8, 1999)

Number of wins by tour
- Korn Ferry Tour: 4
- Other: 2

Best results in major championships
- Masters Tournament: 56th: 2000
- PGA Championship: T10: 1998
- U.S. Open: T17: 2004
- The Open Championship: T11: 2004

Jules Ira "Skip" Kendall (born September 9, 1964) is an American professional golfer. He plays on the PGA Tour Champions and formerly played on the Web.com Tour and the PGA Tour.

== Early life and amateur career ==
In 1964, Kendall was born in Milwaukee, Wisconsin. He attended Nicolet High School in Milwaukee. In high school he played three sports. In soccer, he made the All-State team as a senior. In basketball, he was team MVP and team captain in 1982. In golf, he finished second in the state as both a sophomore and a senior.

He then attended the University of Nevada-Las Vegas and graduated in 1987 with a degree in Business Education.

== Professional career ==
In 1987, Kendall became a professional golfer and was medalist at the PGA Tour Qualifying Tournament in 1992. Kendall has never won a PGA Tour event or a PGA Tour Champions event. However, he did have over two dozen top-10 finishes on the PGA Tour. These include runner-up finishes at the 1998 Buick Invitational, 1999 Canon Greater Hartford Open, 2000 Southern Farm Bureau Classic, and 2004 Bob Hope Chrysler Classic.

The 1999 season was among his best on the PGA Tour. In addition to his second place finish at Hartford he finished T10 at the Players Championship. That season he recorded his highest ranking on the Official World Golf Ranking of #68. Overall he recorded 13 top-25 finishes, made 24 cuts, and earned $962,642. He also earned $1,206,438 in 2004 with seven top-25 finishes.

He also has four Nationwide Tour victories.

=== Senior career ===
Since 2014, Kendall has played on the PGA Tour Champions and has had three top-10 finishes.

In 2015, Kendall missed the cut for the Puerto Rico Open and the Barbasol Championship, scoring 78 in both events on the first round and ended up getting 9-over-par in both tournaments. He did however finish 2015 ranked 69th on the 2015 Champions Tour money list, and finished T10 at the 2015 Shaw Charity Classic.

Kendall is credited with introducing Chris DiMarco to the "claw" putting grip.

Kendall finished his PGA Tour career with over $9.8 million in earnings.

== Personal life ==
Kendall and his wife Traci have three children. They live in Windermere, Florida.

== Professional wins (6) ==
=== Web.com Tour wins (4) ===
No.	Date	Tournament	Winning score	Margin of victory	Runner(s)-up
1	Feb 6, 1994	Nike Inland Empire Open	−19 (65-67-65=197) (Note: Shortened to 54 holes due to weather.)	6 strokes	(United States) Emlyn Aubrey
2	May 26, 1994	Nike Carolina Classic	−12 (65-72-70-69=276)	2 strokes	(United States) Pat Bates
3	Mar 25, 2007	Chitimacha Louisiana Open	−16 (66-66-66-70=268)	Playoff	(United States) Paul Claxton
4	Feb 19, 2012	Pacific Rubiales Colombia Championship	−10 (70-67-66-71=274)	1 stroke	(United States) Andres Gonzales, (United States) Andrew Svoboda

Web.com Tour playoff record (1–0)

No.	Year	Tournament	Opponent	Result
1	2007	Chitimacha Louisiana Open	(United States) Paul Claxton	Won with birdie on third extra hole

=== Other wins (2) ===
- 1988 Wisconsin State Open
- 1989 Wisconsin State Open

== Playoff record ==
PGA Tour playoff record (0–3)

No.	Year	Tournament	Opponent	Result
1	1998	Buick Invitational	(United States) Scott Simpson	Lost to birdie on first extra hole
2	2000	Southern Farm Bureau Classic	(United States) Steve Lowery	Lost to birdie on first extra hole
3	2004	Bob Hope Chrysler Classic	(United States) Phil Mickelson	Lost to birdie on first extra hole

== Results in major championships ==
Tournament	1992	1993	1994	1995	1996	1997	1998	1999	2000	2001	2002	2003	2004	2005	2006
Masters Tournament									56						
U.S. Open	CUT				T82					CUT			T17		T56
The Open Championship							CUT					T59	T11		
PGA Championship							T10	T21	T27	T63	CUT	CUT	73		

Top 10
Did not play

CUT = missed the half-way cut
"T" indicates a tie for a place

== Results in The Players Championship ==
Tournament	1998	1999	2000	2001	2002	2003	2004	2005
The Players Championship	68	T10	CUT	T26	CUT	T32	CUT	CUT

Top 10

CUT = missed the halfway cut
"T" indicates a tie for a place

== Results in World Golf Championships ==
Tournament	2001
Match Play	R64
Championship	NT^{1}
Invitational	

^{1}Cancelled due to 9/11

Did not play

QF, R16, R32, R64 = Round in which player lost in match play
NT = No tournament

== See also ==
- 1992 PGA Tour Qualifying School graduates
- 1994 Nike Tour graduates
- 1996 Nike Tour graduates
- List of golfers with most Web.com Tour wins
- List of Jewish golfers
