= Wisconsin State Golf Association =

The Wisconsin State Golf Association (WSGA) is a 501(c)6 organization comprising member golf clubs and individual golfing members located in the state of Wisconsin. The WSGA is directed by a statewide Board of Directors, while the daily affairs are managed by a full-time executive director and an administrative staff. In 1964, the WSGA established the Wisconsin Golf Hall of Fame.

== Tournaments ==
The WSGA annually conducts 14 tournaments and championships for players of various skill levels.

- Wisconsin State Amateur Championship
- Match Play Championship
- Bestball (Four-Ball) Championship
- Junior Boys Championship
- Pater-Filius (Father-Son) Championship
- Mid-Amateur Championship
- Net Amateur Championship
- 2-Man Team Championship
- Senior Amateur Championship
- Senior Match Play Championship
- Senior Bestball (Four-Ball) Championship
- Senior 2-Man Team Championship
- Net Partners Series and Championship
- Senior Tour and Championship
