= Medinah, Illinois =

- Unincorporated community
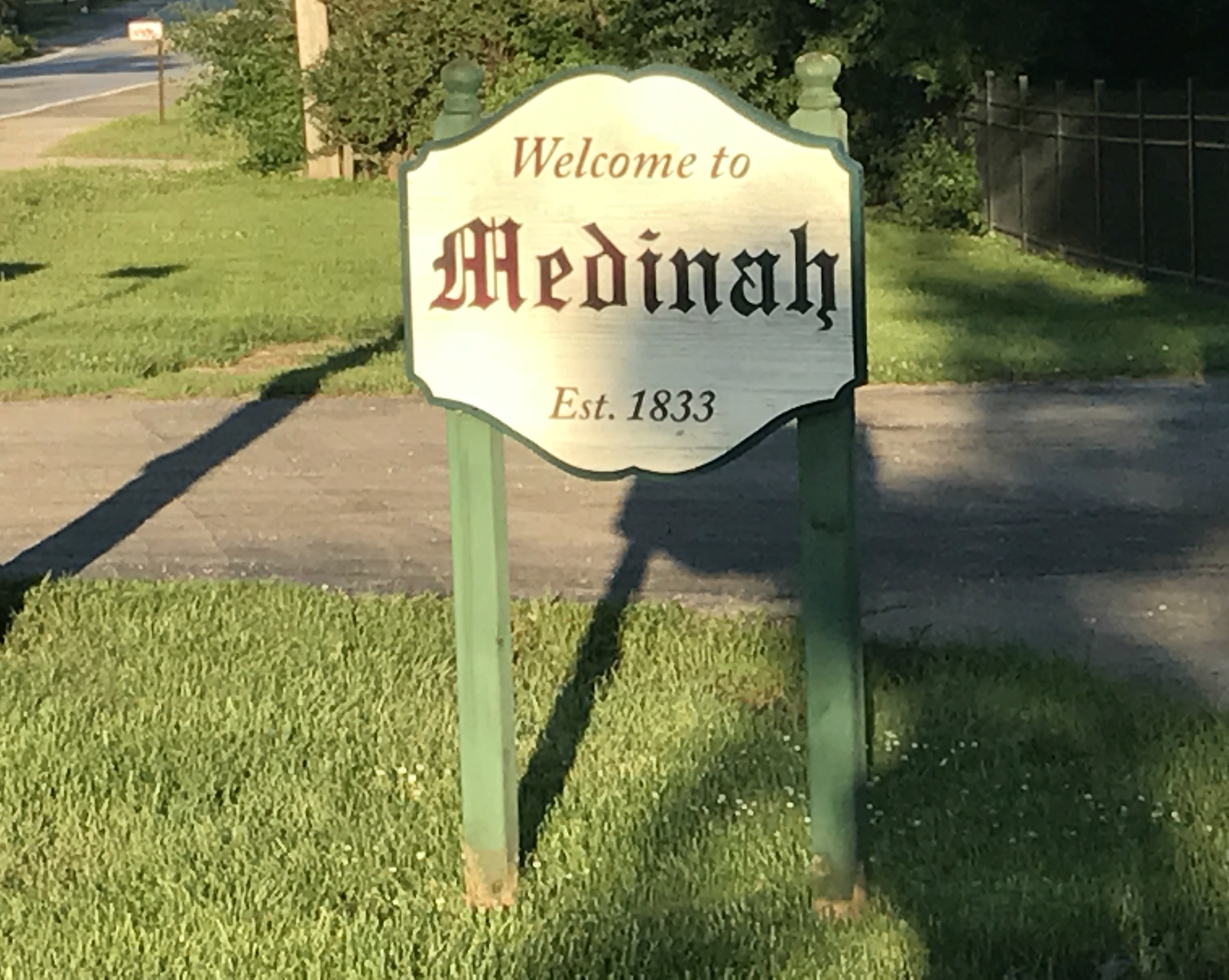
- Monument sign on Illinois Route 19 welcoming drivers to Medinah

- Location of Medinah within Illinois Medinah, Illinois (the United States)
- Coordinates: 41°58′53″N 88°03′04″W
- Country: United States
- State: Illinois
- County: DuPage
- Township: Bloomingdale
- Time zone: UTC-6 (CST)
  - Summer (DST): UTC-5 (CDT)
- ZIP Code: 60157
- Area code(s): 630, 331

Medinah is an unincorporated community in the state of Illinois and is a northwest suburb of Chicago, located in DuPage County. It is neighbored by the three villages of Roselle, Itasca, and Bloomingdale along old Chicago–Galena highway between Route 19 and 20.

== History ==
The community of Medinah is named after the Medinah Country Club. In the 1920s, a group of members of the city of Chicago's Medinah Temple (affiliated with the Shriners) moved into the area, then known as Meacham (for the Meacham, Lawrence and Rosenwinkel families). Together, they built a country retreat and 54-hole golf course, aiming to make it the best golf course in North America. The club had 1,500 members in the late 1920s; the Great Depression and World War II drove membership down until the postwar period, when membership recovered to the present-day 600.

In 1999, a group led by Jack Roeser and backed by Senator James Philip attempted to bring a charter school to Medinah. The proposed Thomas Jefferson Charter School was met with NIMBY opposition by local residents. The charter school ultimately ended up opening on the northwest side of Chicago busing students from the northwest and west suburbs.

Within the last 30 years, the growth of the Chicago metropolitan area has brought more people to the surrounding areas. In spite of this growth, Medinah has remained adamant in retaining its identity, occasionally conflicting with state agencies (such as the Illinois Department of Transportation, or IDOT) and other municipalities with regards to utilities and services. A recent point of contention was the widening of Medinah Road to five lanes—after vocal protests, IDOT agreed to widen the road to only three lanes.

== Post office history ==
The first post office opened as Meacham Illinois in 1874 in a general store. Meacham was named after the town's first settlers, the Meacham family. A never-official but commonly used early name for the community was Meacham's Grove, Illinois.

The second post office was in the train station (1940s) until 1963. Meacham, Illinois' name was changed to Medinah in 1924. Medinah is named after the Medinah Country Club.

The third and current post office was opened in 1963.

== Geography ==
Medinah is located about 23 miles west of downtown Chicago. The community center is located just south of the Medinah Metra Milwaukee District West train station at the corner of Medinah Road and Irving Park Road (Illinois Route 19). Medinah is known for its large properties, with many homes situated on lot sizes of nearly an acre or more. This gives the town rural characteristics, while still being close to shopping and expressways for easy travel. The boundaries of Medinah are more properly defined by the boundaries of its surrounding incorporated cities, but can be approximated by the Elgin-O'Hare Expressway to the north, Plum Grove Road to the west, Lake Street (U.S. Route 20) to the south and the Medinah Country Club to the east.

== Demographics ==
According to the 2015 American Community Survey (Note: Medinah is coterminous with zip code 60157. This allows one to use Census data without doing original research.) Medinah has an estimated population of 2,097 people and 744 households. The racial makeup of the area was 93.6% White, 1% African American, 5.2% Asian, and 0.3% from other races. Hispanic or Latino of any race were 1.5% of the population. The median age was 42.8 years. The age distribution was as follows; 24.9% were under the age of 19, 14.9% were between 20 years and 39 years, 43.6% were between 40 years and 64 years, and 16.6% were over the age of 65 years.

The median household income was $132,917. The area had an income distribution in which 1.16% of households earned less than $25,000 annually; 15.19% of households earned between $25,000 and $49,999; 33.47% of households earned between $50,000 and $99,999; 16.40% of households earned between $100,000 and $149,999 and 33.79% of households earned more than $150,000.

== Sports ==
Medinah is home to the Medinah Country Club, which hosted the USGA US Open in 1990, 1975, and 1949. Medinah also hosted the 1999 and 2006 PGA Championships, as well as the 2012 Ryder Cup and the 2019 BMW Championship. Medinah will also be hosting the 2026 Presidents Cup.

== Education ==
Medinah Elementary School District 11 operates three schools in Medinah, the Medinah Primary School, Medinah Intermediate School, and the Medinah Middle School. In addition, the community of Medinah has a park district that operates several parks within the community. In addition, Lake Park High School District 108 operates the eastern campus of Lake Park High School on Medinah Road south of the community center.

== Infrastructure ==
=== Transportation ===
Medinah has a station on Metra's Milwaukee District West Line, which provides daily rail service between Elgin, Illinois and Chicago, Illinois (at Union Station).
