= Scott McCarron =

American professional golfer (born 1965)

Personal information
- Full name: Scott Michael McCarron
- Nationality: United States
- Born: July 10, 1965 (age 61) Sacramento, California, U.S.
- Height: 5 ft 10 in (1.78 m)
- Weight: 170 lb (77 kg; 12 st)
- Spouse: Jenny McCarron (m. 2016)
- Children: 2

Career
- Sport: Golf
- College: UCLA
- Turned professional: 1992
- Current tour: PGA Tour Champions
- Former tour: PGA Tour
- Professional wins: 20
- Highest ranking: 20 (March 3, 2002)

Number of wins by tour
- PGA Tour: 3
- PGA Tour Champions: 11
- Other: 6

Best results in major championships
- Masters Tournament: T10: 1996
- PGA Championship: T10: 1997
- U.S. Open: T10: 1997
- The Open Championship: T18: 2002

Achievements and awards
- PGA Tour Champions Charles Schwab Cup winner: 2019
- PGA Tour Champions money list winner: 2019
- PGA Tour Champions Player of the Year: 2019

Scott Michael McCarron (born July 10, 1965) is an American professional golfer. McCarron was formerly a member of the PGA Tour but now plays on the PGA Tour Champions.

== Early life and amateur career ==
McCarron was born in Sacramento, California and graduated from Vintage High School in Napa, California. He was a member of the golf team at UCLA, graduating in 1988 with a major in History.

Unlike most golfers, McCarron did not transition right away from the college to the professional ranks – he gave up golf for four years (1988–1992) to work with his father in the family golf apparel business.

== Professional career ==
In 1992, McCarron turned professional and joined the PGA Tour in 1994 after his success at 1994 PGA Tour Qualifying School.

McCarron won three times on the PGA Tour, with his victories coming in 1996, 1997 and 2001.

McCarron has featured in the top 20 of the Official World Golf Ranking.

McCarron was injured in the summer of 2006 and missed the entire 2007 season. He served as an analyst for The Golf Channel for its 2007 Masters coverage. He returned to the PGA Tour in 2008 and finished 108th on the money list to retain his card for 2009.

In 2010, McCarron became embroiled in controversy when he accused fellow PGA Tour player Phil Mickelson of "cheating" for using a Ping-Eye 2 wedge made before April 1, 1990 that is allowed under a legal technicality. McCarron publicly apologized to Mickelson a few days after. 30 days later, the PGA Tour and USGA banned the use of the Ping-Eye 2 wedges.

McCarron has won 11 times on the PGA Tour Champions, including one senior major, the 2017 Constellation Senior Players Championship. He made up a six-shot deficit in the final round to claim his first major by one shot.

On May 5, 2019, McCarron won the Insperity Invitational on the PGA Tour Champions for his tenth Champions tour title. The following month McCarron won the MasterCard Japan Championship by three strokes for his third win of the season.

On November 10, 2019, McCarron won the season-long Charles Schwab Cup and a $1,000,000 annuity on the PGA Tour Champions.

On January 15, 2020, McCarron received the Jack Nicklaus Trophy as the 2019 PGA Tour Champions Player of the Year.

== Professional wins (20) ==
=== PGA Tour wins (3) ===
No.	Date	Tournament	Winning score	Margin of victory	Runner(s)-up
1	Mar 24, 1996	Freeport-McDermott Classic	−13 (68-67-69-71=275)	5 strokes	(United States) Tom Watson
2	May 11, 1997	BellSouth Classic	−14 (70-69-66-69=274)	3 strokes	(United States) David Duval, (United States) Brian Henninger, (United States) Lee Janzen
3	Apr 1, 2001	BellSouth Classic (2)	−8 (68-67-72-73=280)	1 stroke	(Canada) Mike Weir

PGA Tour playoff record (0–2)

No.	Year	Tournament	Opponent(s)	Result
1	2003	Las Vegas Invitational	(Australia) Stuart Appleby	Lost to birdie on first extra hole
2	2004	Reno–Tahoe Open	(Australia) Stephen Allan, (United States) Hunter Mahan, (United States) Vaughn Taylor	Taylor won with birdie on first extra hole

=== Other wins (6) ===
- 1994 Long Beach Open
- 1997 Franklin Templeton Shark Shootout (with Bruce Lietzke)
- 2000 Franklin Templeton Shootout (with Brad Faxon)
- 2001 Franklin Templeton Shootout (with Brad Faxon)
- 2002 Fred Meyer Challenge (with Brian Henninger)
- 2016 TaylorMade Pebble Beach Invitational

=== PGA Tour Champions wins (11) ===
Legend
PGA Tour Champions major championships (1)
Charles Schwab Cup playoff events (1)
Other PGA Tour Champions (9)

No.	Date	Tournament	Winning score	Margin of victory	Runner(s)-up
1	Jun 5, 2016	Principal Charity Classic	−15 (68-68-65=201)	1 stroke	(United States) Billy Andrade, (Spain) Miguel Ángel Jiménez
2	Nov 6, 2016	Dominion Charity Classic	−13 (67-67-69=203)	Playoff	(United States) Tom Byrum
3	Feb 12, 2017	Allianz Championship	−17 (66-66-67=199)	1 stroke	(Paraguay) Carlos Franco, (United States) Kenny Perry
4	Jul 16, 2017	Constellation Senior Players Championship	−18 (67-68-69-66=270)	1 stroke	(United States) Brandt Jobe, (Germany) Bernhard Langer
5	Aug 20, 2017	Dick's Sporting Goods Open	−20 (71-61-64=196)	1 stroke	(United States) Kevin Sutherland
6	Sep 3, 2017	Shaw Charity Classic	−16 (63-64-67=194)	1 stroke	(Spain) Miguel Ángel Jiménez
7	Jun 24, 2018	American Family Insurance Championship	−15 (70-67-64=201)	1 stroke	(United States) Jerry Kelly
8	Sep 2, 2018	Shaw Charity Classic (2)	−15 (67-65-63=195)	1 stroke	(United States) Joe Durant, (United States) Scott Parel, (United States) Kirk Triplett
9	Apr 21, 2019	Mitsubishi Electric Classic	−7 (68-70-71=209)	2 strokes	(United States) Joe Durant, (United States) Kent Jones, (United States) Jerry Kelly, (United States) Kirk Triplett
10	May 5, 2019	Insperity Invitational	−17 (67-65-67=199)	2 strokes	(United States) Scott Parel
11	Jun 9, 2019	MasterCard Japan Championship	−13 (69-67-67=203)	3 strokes	(United States) Billy Andrade, (United States) Kirk Triplett

PGA Tour Champions playoff record (1–1)

No.	Year	Tournament	Opponent	Result
1	2016	Pacific Links Bear Mountain Championship	(Scotland) Colin Montgomerie	Lost to birdie on third extra hole
2	2016	Dominion Charity Classic	(United States) Tom Byrum	Won with birdie on first extra hole

== Results in major championships ==
Tournament	1996	1997	1998	1999	2000	2001	2002	2003	2004	2005	2006	2007	2008	2009
Masters Tournament	T10	T30	T16	T18			CUT	T23						
U.S. Open	T82	T10	T40				T30	CUT		CUT				
The Open Championship		CUT					T18	T34					CUT	
PGA Championship	T47	T10	CUT			T70	T39	T14	CUT	T59				T24

Top 10
Did not play

CUT = missed the halfway cut
"T" indicates a tie for a place.

=== Summary ===
Tournament	Wins	2nd	3rd	Top-5	Top-10	Top-25	Events	Cuts made
Masters Tournament	0	0	0	0	1	4	6	5
U.S. Open	0	0	0	0	1	1	6	4
The Open Championship	0	0	0	0	0	1	4	2
PGA Championship	0	0	0	0	1	3	9	7
Totals	0	0	0	0	3	9	25	18

- Most consecutive cuts made – 5 (1996 Masters – 1997 U.S. Open)
- Longest streak of top-10s – 1 (three times)

== Results in The Players Championship ==
Tournament	1996	1997	1998	1999
The Players Championship	CUT	CUT	T35	CUT

Tournament	2000	2001	2002	2003	2004	2005	2006	2007	2008	2009
The Players Championship	T66	T44	CUT	CUT	T53	CUT	CUT			CUT

Tournament	2010	2011	2012	2013	2014	2015	2016	2017	2018
The Players Championship	CUT								CUT

Did not play

CUT = missed the halfway cut
"T" indicates a tie for a place

== Results in World Golf Championships ==
Tournament	2002	2003
Match Play	2	R64
Championship	6	
Invitational	T75	

Top 10
Did not play

QF, R16, R32, R64 = Round in which player lost in match play
"T" = Tied

== Senior major championships ==
=== Wins (1) ===
Year	Championship	54 holes	Winning score	Margin	Runners-up
2017	Constellation Senior Players Championship	6 shot deficit	−18 (67-68-69-66=270)	1 stroke	(United States) Brandt Jobe, (Germany) Bernhard Langer

=== Results timeline ===
Results not in chronological order.

Tournament	2015	2016	2017	2018	2019	2020	2021	2022	2023	2024	2025	2026
Senior PGA Championship	–	T7	T5	T3	2	NT	T34	T33	T12	T51	CUT	CUT
The Tradition	–	6	T2	T5	T66	NT	T35	T16	T36	T22	T65	74
U.S. Senior Open	–	CUT	T37	T52	T6	NT		T49			CUT	
Senior Players Championship	–	13	1	T4	T7	T28	T37	T55	T30	T60	T52	T60
Senior British Open Championship	T25	2	T23	T3		NT				T25	CUT	

Win
Top 10
Did not play

CUT = missed the halfway cut
"T" indicates a tie for a place
NT = no tournament due to COVID-19 pandemic

== See also ==
- 1994 PGA Tour Qualifying School graduates
- List of golfers with most PGA Tour Champions wins
