= Wes Short Jr. =

American professional golfer (born 1963)

Personal information
- Full name: Wesley Earl Short Jr.
- Nationality: United States
- Born: December 4, 1963 (age 62) Austin, Texas, U.S.
- Height: 6 ft 0 in (1.83 m)
- Weight: 190 lb (86 kg; 14 st)

Career
- Sport: Golf
- College: University of Texas
- Turned professional: 1987
- Current tour: PGA Tour Champions
- Former tours: PGA Tour; NGA Hooters Tour
- Professional wins: 6
- Highest ranking: 72 (January 8, 2006)

Number of wins by tour
- PGA Tour: 1
- PGA Tour Champions: 2
- Other: 3

Best results in major championships
- Masters Tournament: DNP
- PGA Championship: CUT: 2006
- U.S. Open: CUT: 2016
- The Open Championship: DNP

Wesley Earl Short Jr. (born December 4, 1963) is an American professional golfer who has played on the PGA Tour, Nationwide Tour, and PGA Tour Champions.

== Early life and amateur career ==
Short was born, raised and has lived his entire life in Austin, Texas. He attended the University of Texas.

== Professional career ==
In 1987, Short turned professional. He worked as a club pro in the Austin area for a number of years. In 1997, he turned pro. He started out on the mini-tours and eventually qualified for the Nationwide Tour for the 1998 season. He was a member of the Nationwide Tour again in 2002–03. His best finish on the Nationwide Tour was a T-2 at The Reese's Cup Classic in 2003.

Short finally earned the opportunity to play on the PGA Tour in 2004 as a 40-year-old rookie. His only PGA Tour win came in 2005 at the Michelin Championship at Las Vegas, when he defeated Jim Furyk at the second hole in a sudden-death playoff. At the beginning of the week, Short had been fourth alternate to get into the field. Lingering back problems kept Short from competing for three years and he attempted to restart his PGA Tour career in 2013. Short made the cut at the 2013 Shell Houston Open, his first on the PGA since 2007. Short was unable to satisfy his medical extension, making five cuts in fifteen events.

Short earned medalist honors at the 2013 Champions Tour qualifying school. He earned his first Champions Tour win at the 2014 Quebec Championship.

In 2016, Short qualified for his first U.S. Open.

On September 1, 2019, Short won his second event on the PGA Tour Champions at the Shaw Charity Classic in Calgary, Alberta.

== Personal life ==
Short is married to Gail Elizabeth Hardy: they have a daughter.

== Professional wins (6) ==
=== PGA Tour wins (1) ===
No.	Date	Tournament	Winning score	To par	Margin of victory	Runner-up
1	Oct 16, 2005	Michelin Championship at Las Vegas	67-67-66-66=266	−21	Playoff	(United States) Jim Furyk

PGA Tour playoff record (1–0)

No.	Year	Tournament	Opponent	Result
1	2005	Michelin Championship at Las Vegas	(United States) Jim Furyk	Won with par on second extra hole

=== NGA Hooters Tour wins (2) ===
No.	Date	Tournament	Winning score	To par	Margin of victory	Runner-up
1	Mar 28, 1999	Dick Brooks Automotive Classic	71-69-69-66=275	−13	3 strokes	(United States) Chris Winchip
2	Sep 26, 1999	Civitas Bank Classic	67-67-67-71=272	−12	Playoff	(United States) Craig Cozby

=== Other wins (1) ===
- 1994 PGA Assistant Professional Championship

=== PGA Tour Champions wins (2) ===
No.	Date	Tournament	Winning score	To par	Margin of victory	Runner-up
1	Sep 7, 2014	Quebec Championship	69-68-64=201	−15	1 stroke	(United States) Scott Dunlap
2	Sep 1, 2019	Shaw Charity Classic	64-67-66=197	−13	1 stroke	(United States) Scott McCarron

PGA Tour Champions playoff record (0–1)

No.	Year	Tournament	Opponent	Result
1	2016	Mitsubishi Electric Classic	(United States) Woody Austin	Lost to par on second extra hole

== Results in major championships ==
Tournament	2006	2007	2008	2009	2010	2011	2012	2013	2014	2015	2016
U.S. Open											CUT
PGA Championship	CUT										

Did not play

CUT = missed the halfway cut
Note: Short never played in the Masters Tournament or The Open Championship.

== Results in The Players Championship ==
Tournament	2006
The Players Championship	CUT

CUT = missed the halfway cut

== Results in World Golf Championships ==
Tournament	2006
Match Play	
Championship	
Invitational	T71

Did not play

"T" = Tied

== See also ==
- 2003 PGA Tour Qualifying School graduates
