= Mark Wiebe =

American professional golfer (born 1957)

Personal information
- Full name: Mark Charles Wiebe
- Nationality: United States
- Born: September 13, 1957 (age 69) Seaside, Oregon, U.S.
- Height: 6 ft 2 in (1.88 m)
- Weight: 210 lb (95 kg; 15 st)

Career
- Sport: Golf
- College: Palomar College; San Jose State University
- Turned professional: 1980
- Former tours: PGA Tour; Nationwide Tour; PGA Tour Champions
- Professional wins: 8
- Highest ranking: 51 (February 19, 1989)

Number of wins by tour
- PGA Tour: 2
- PGA Tour Champions: 5
- Other: 1

Best results in major championships
- Masters Tournament: T35: 1987
- PGA Championship: T12: 1989
- U.S. Open: T25: 1988
- The Open Championship: CUT: 1997, 2001, 2014

Mark Charles Wiebe (born September 13, 1957) is an American professional golfer who played on the PGA Tour, Nationwide Tour and PGA Tour Champions.

== Early life ==
Wiebe was born in Seaside, Oregon and grew up in Escondido, California. He attended Escondido High School from 1972 to 1975.

== Amateur career ==
Wiebe attended Palomar College from 1976 to 1977 and then San Jose State University from 1978 to 1979. He was a member of the golf team at both institutions. While a student at Palomar, he was the individual medalist at the 1977 California Amateur and won the 1977 Idaho Amateur. In addition, he holds the Palomar school record for low round at 6-under-par (66).

== Professional career ==
Wiebe turned pro in 1980 and joined the PGA Tour in 1983. He has about four dozen top-10 finishes in PGA Tour events including two wins. His first win came in 1985 at the Anheuser-Busch Golf Classic when he beat John Mahaffey with a birdie on the first extra hole of a sudden-death playoff. In 1986, he won the Hardee's Golf Classic and finished 25th on the final money list. Wiebe's best finish in a major was a T-12 at the 1989 PGA Championship. Wiebe was a co-leader after 36 holes with Tom Watson at the 1987 U.S. Open before shooting closing rounds of 77 and 79 to finish tied for 58th.

Wiebe became eligible to join the Champions Tour when he turned 50 in September 2007. He won the first Champions Tour tournament that he played in at the SAS Championship. Wiebe matched Bobby Wadkins as the tour's youngest winner at 50 years and 10 days old.

On July 29, 2013, Wiebe won his maiden senior major at the Senior Open Championship at the Royal Birkdale Golf Club. He defeated Bernhard Langer on the fifth hole of a sudden-death playoff with a par, after both players finished the tournament at nine-under-par. Wiebe began the final round four shots back of Langer, but produced a four-under round of 66 to make the playoff, after Langer had double-bogeyed the final hole of regulation play. Both players parred the first two extra holes before play was halted due to darkness, becoming the first ever Senior Open Championship to have a Monday finish. At the third extra hole, Langer missed a twelve footer for the victory, before Wiebe won at the fifth extra hole with a par, after Langer could not get up and down from a greenside bunker. On September 22, 2013, Wiebe won his second event of the year at the Pacific Links Hawai'i Championship. He defeated Corey Pavin in a sudden-death playoff with a par on the second extra hole.

== Personal life ==
Wiebe lives in Denver, Colorado and is the father of three children. His son, Gunner, is also a professional golfer and qualified for PGA Tour Latinoamérica in 2013 and for the European Tour in 2023. He finished runner-up at the 2023 Betfred British Masters.

== Amateur wins ==
- 1977 California Amateur
- 1977 Idaho Amateur
- 1979 Pacific Northwest Amateur

== Professional wins (8) ==
=== PGA Tour wins (2) ===
No.	Date	Tournament	Winning score	Margin of victory	Runner-up
1	Jul 14, 1985	Anheuser-Busch Golf Classic	−11 (70-69-64-70=273)	Playoff	(United States) John Mahaffey
2	Jul 20, 1986	Hardee's Golf Classic	−12 (69-65-66-68=268)	1 stroke	(United States) Curt Byrum

PGA Tour playoff record (1–2)

No.	Year	Tournament	Opponent	Result
1	1985	Anheuser-Busch Golf Classic	(United States) John Mahaffey	Won with birdie on first extra hole
2	1988	Anheuser-Busch Golf Classic	(United States) Tom Sieckmann	Lost to par on second extra hole
3	1993	Buick Classic	(Fiji) Vijay Singh	Lost to birdie on third extra hole

=== Other wins (1) ===
- 1986 Colorado Open

=== Champions Tour wins (5) ===
Legend
Senior major championships (1)
Other Champions Tour (4)

No.	Date	Tournament	Winning score	Margin of victory	Runner-up
1	Sep 23, 2007	SAS Championship	−18 (65-66-67=198)	3 strokes	(United States) Dana Quigley
2	Apr 6, 2008	Cap Cana Championship	−14 (67-68-67=202)	4 strokes	(Argentina) Vicente Fernández
3	Jun 12, 2011	Greater Hickory Classic at Rock Barn	−19 (64-68-65=197)	Playoff	(United States) James Mason
4	Jul 29, 2013	The Senior Open Championship	−9 (70-65-70-66=271)	Playoff	(Germany) Bernhard Langer
5	Sep 22, 2013	Pacific Links Hawai'i Championship	−11 (64-69-72=205)	Playoff	(United States) Corey Pavin

Champions Tour playoff record (3–0)

No.	Year	Tournament	Opponent	Result
1	2011	Greater Hickory Classic at Rock Barn	(United States) James Mason	Won with par on third extra hole
2	2013	The Senior Open Championship	(Germany) Bernhard Langer	Won with par on fifth extra hole
3	2013	Pacific Links Hawai'i Championship	(United States) Corey Pavin	Won with par on second extra hole

== Results in major championships ==
Tournament	1985	1986	1987	1988	1989
Masters Tournament		CUT	T35		CUT
U.S. Open	CUT		T58	T25	T33
The Open Championship					
PGA Championship	CUT	T47	T65	T38	T12

Tournament	1990	1991	1992	1993	1994	1995	1996	1997	1998	1999
Masters Tournament										
U.S. Open	CUT			T77			104	CUT		
The Open Championship								CUT		
PGA Championship	T19	T66		67			T61	WD	CUT	

Tournament	2000	2001	2002	2003	2004	2005	2006	2007	2008	2009
Masters Tournament										
U.S. Open		T52								
The Open Championship		CUT								
PGA Championship										

Tournament	2010	2011	2012	2013	2014
Masters Tournament					
U.S. Open					
The Open Championship					CUT
PGA Championship					

Did not play

WD = withdrew
CUT = missed the half-way cut
"T" indicates a tie for a place

== Senior major championships ==
=== Wins (1) ===
Year	Championship	54 holes	Winning score	Margin	Runner-up
2013	The Senior Open Championship	4 shot deficit	−9 (70-65-70-66=271)	Playoff^{1}	(Germany) Bernhard Langer

^{1} Defeated Langer in a sudden-death playoff with a par at the fifth extra hole

=== Senior results timeline ===
Results are not in chronological order.

Tournament	2007	2008	2009	2010	2011	2012	2013	2014	2015	2016
The Tradition	–	T18	T41	T6	T28	T45	77	58	T70	
Senior PGA Championship	–	T30	T44	CUT	T60	CUT	T59	75	CUT	
Senior Players Championship	T7	T43	T3	T33	T17	T14	T60	T62	T57	
The Senior Open Championship	–	T27	T47	T46	CUT	T6	1	CUT	T58	
U.S. Senior Open	–	CUT	T22	T18	T23	8	CUT	CUT	T62	WD

Win
Top 10
Did not play

CUT = missed the halfway cut
WD = withdrew
"T" indicates a tie for a place

== See also ==
- 1983 PGA Tour Qualifying School graduates
- 1984 PGA Tour Qualifying School graduates
