= 2019 PGA Tour Champions season =

Golf tour season

- Duration: January 17, 2019 – November 10, 2019
- Number of official events: 27
- Most wins: (United States) Jerry Kelly (3) (United States) Scott McCarron (3)
- Charles Schwab Cup: (United States) Scott McCarron
- Money list: (United States) Scott McCarron
- Player of the Year: (United States) Scott McCarron
- Rookie of the Year: (South Africa) Retief Goosen

The 2019 PGA Tour Champions season was the 40th season of PGA Tour Champions (formerly the Senior PGA Tour and the Champions Tour), the main professional golf tour in the United States for men aged 50 and over.

== Schedule ==
The following table lists official events during the 2019 season.

Date	Tournament	Location	Purse (US$)	Winner (Note: The number in parentheses after each winner's name is the number of PGA Tour Champions events they had won up to and including that tournament. This information is only shown for PGA Tour Champions members.)	Notes
Jan 19	Mitsubishi Electric Championship at Hualalai	Hawaii	1,800,000	(United States) Tom Lehman (12)	
Feb 10	Oasis Championship	Florida	1,700,000	(Germany) Bernhard Langer (39)	
Feb 17	Chubb Classic	Florida	1,600,000	(Spain) Miguel Ángel Jiménez (7)	
Mar 3	Cologuard Classic	Arizona	1,700,000	(United States) Mark O'Meara (3)	
Mar 10	Hoag Classic	California	1,800,000	(United States) Kirk Triplett (7)	
Mar 31	Rapiscan Systems Classic	Mississippi	1,600,000	(United States) Kevin Sutherland (2)	
Apr 21	Mitsubishi Electric Classic	Georgia	1,800,000	(United States) Scott McCarron (9)	
Apr 28	Bass Pro Shops Legends of Golf	Missouri	1,800,000	(United States) Scott Hoch (4) and (United States) Tom Pernice Jr. (6)	Team event
May 5	Insperity Invitational	Texas	2,200,000	(United States) Scott McCarron (10)	
May 13	Regions Tradition	Alabama	2,400,000	(United States) Steve Stricker (4)	PGA Tour Champions major championship
May 26	KitchenAid Senior PGA Championship	New York	3,250,000	(United States) Ken Tanigawa (2)	Senior major championship
Jun 2	Principal Charity Classic	Iowa	1,850,000	(United States) Kevin Sutherland (3)	
Jun 9	MasterCard Japan Championship	Japan	2,500,000	(United States) Scott McCarron (11)	
Jun 23	American Family Insurance Championship	Wisconsin	2,000,000	(United States) Jerry Kelly (4)	
Jun 30	U.S. Senior Open	Indiana	4,000,000	(United States) Steve Stricker (5)	Senior major championship
Jul 14	Bridgestone Senior Players Championship	Ohio	2,800,000	(South Africa) Retief Goosen (1)	PGA Tour Champions major championship
Jul 28	The Senior Open Championship	England	2,000,000	(Germany) Bernhard Langer (40)	Senior major championship
Aug 18	Dick's Sporting Goods Open	New York	2,050,000	(United States) Doug Barron (1)	
Aug 25	Boeing Classic	Washington	2,100,000	(United States) Brandt Jobe (2)	
Sep 1	Shaw Charity Classic	Canada	2,350,000	(United States) Wes Short Jr. (2)	
Sep 15	The Ally Challenge	Michigan	2,000,000	(United States) Jerry Kelly (5)	
Sep 22	Sanford International	South Dakota	1,800,000	(United States) Rocco Mediate (4)	
Sep 29	PURE Insurance Championship	California	2,100,000	(United States) Kirk Triplett (8)	
Oct 13	SAS Championship	North Carolina	2,100,000	(United States) Jerry Kelly (6)	
Oct 21	Dominion Energy Charity Classic	Virginia	2,000,000	(Spain) Miguel Ángel Jiménez (8)	Charles Schwab Cup playoff event
Nov 3	Invesco QQQ Championship	California	2,000,000	(Scotland) Colin Montgomerie (7)	Charles Schwab Cup playoff event
Nov 10	Charles Schwab Cup Championship	Arizona	2,500,000	(United States) Jeff Maggert (6)	Charles Schwab Cup playoff event

=== Unofficial events ===
The following events were sanctioned by PGA Tour Champions, but did not carry official money, nor were wins official.

Date	Tournament	Location	Purse ($)	Winners	Notes
Dec 8	PNC Father-Son Challenge	Florida	1,085,000	(Germany) Bernhard Langer and son Jason Langer	Team event

== Charles Schwab Cup ==
The Charles Schwab Cup was based on tournament results during the season, calculated using a points-based system.

Position	Player	Points
1	(United States) Scott McCarron	2,534,090
2	(United States) Jerry Kelly	2,510,865
3	(South Africa) Retief Goosen	2,290,985
4	(Germany) Bernhard Langer	2,247,434
5	(Scotland) Colin Montgomerie	2,100,177

== Money list ==
The money list was based on prize money won during the season, calculated in U.S. dollars.

Position	Player	Prize money ($)
1	(United States) Scott McCarron	2,534,090
2	(United States) Jerry Kelly	2,382,675
3	(South Africa) Retief Goosen	1,859,085
4	(Germany) Bernhard Langer	1,831,622
5	(United States) Woody Austin	1,733,517

== Awards ==
Award	Winner	Ref.
Player of the Year (Jack Nicklaus Trophy)	(United States) Scott McCarron	
Rookie of the Year	(South Africa) Retief Goosen	
Scoring leader (Byron Nelson Award)	(South Africa) Retief Goosen	
