= Rogers Charity Classic =

Professional golf tournament in Canada

Coordinates: 50.942°N 114.096°W

Tournament information
- Location: Calgary, Alberta, Canada
- Established: 2013
- Courses: Canyon Meadows Golf & Country Club
- Par: 70
- Length: 7,061 yards (6,457 m)
- Tour: PGA Tour Champions
- Format: Stroke play
- Prize fund: US$2,500,000
- Month played: August

Tournament record score
- Aggregate: 191 Rocco Mediate (2013)
- To par: −22 as above

Current champion
- (New Zealand) Steven Alker

Location map
- Location in Canada Location in Alberta

The Rogers Charity Classic, formerly the Shaw Charity Classic, is a professional golf tournament in Canada on the Champions Tour, played at Canyon Meadows Golf and Country Club in Calgary, Alberta.

The 54-hole tournament was first played in 2013, and Rocco Mediate won with a 22-under 191, seven strokes ahead of runner-up Tom Byrum. A new course record was set by Bill Glasson at 62 (−9).

The course was changed to par 70 in 2014, with a winner's share of $337,500. Fred Couples chipped in for eagle on the par-5 final hole for a course record 61 (−9) and a total of 195 (−15), then waited for the leaders to finish. Billy Andrade followed with a 62 (−8) to force a two-man playoff, which began on the 18th hole. Couples laid up with a wedge and nearly holed his third shot with a sand wedge; he sank the one-foot (0.3 m) putt for birdie to win the title.

Canyon Meadows opened 69 years ago in 1957 and is south of central Calgary, at an approximate average elevation of 1,095 metres (3,590 ft) above sea level.

== Winners ==
Year	Winner	Score	To par	Margin of victory	Runner(s)-up	Purse ($)	Winner's share ($)
Rogers Charity Classic
2026	(New Zealand) Steven Alker	194	−16	Playoff	(South Korea) Yang Yong-eun	2,500,000	375,000
2025	(Australia) Richard Green	192	−18	1 stroke	(Argentina) Ricardo González	2,500,000	375,000
2024	(United States) Ken Tanigawa	193	−17	2 strokes	(Australia) Richard Green	2,400,000	360,000
Shaw Charity Classic
2023	(United States) Ken Duke	196	−14	1 stroke	(Thailand) Thongchai Jaidee (United States) Tim Petrovic	2,400,000	360,000
2022	(United States) Jerry Kelly	201	−9	Playoff	(United States) John Huston	2,350,000	352,500
2021	(United States) Doug Barron	192	−18	2 strokes	(United States) Steve Flesch	2,350,000	352,500
2020	Canceled due to the COVID-19 pandemic						
2019	(United States) Wes Short Jr.	197	−13	1 stroke	(United States) Scott McCarron	2,350,000	352,500
2018	(United States) Scott McCarron (2)	195	−15	1 stroke	(United States) Joe Durant (United States) Scott Parel (United States) Kirk Triplett	2,350,000	352,500
2017	(United States) Scott McCarron	194	−16	1 stroke	(Spain) Miguel Ángel Jiménez	2,350,000	352,500
2016	(Paraguay) Carlos Franco	192	−18	2 strokes	(United States) Michael Allen (Germany) Bernhard Langer	2,350,000	352,500
2015	(United States) Jeff Maggert	194	−16	4 strokes	(Scotland) Colin Montgomerie	2,350,000	352,500
2014	(United States) Fred Couples	195	−15	Playoff	(United States) Billy Andrade	2,250,000	337,500
2013	(United States) Rocco Mediate	191	−22	7 strokes	(United States) Tom Byrum	2,000,000	300,000
