= Woody Austin =

American professional golfer (born 1964)

Personal information
- Full name: Albert Woody Austin II
- Nickname: Aquaman
- Nationality: United States
- Born: January 27, 1964 (age 62) Tampa, Florida, U.S.
- Height: 6 ft 0 in (1.83 m)
- Weight: 190 lb (86 kg; 14 st)

Career
- Sport: Golf
- College: University of Miami
- Turned professional: 1986
- Current tour: PGA Tour Champions
- Former tour: PGA Tour
- Professional wins: 11
- Highest ranking: 29 (October 28, 2007)

Number of wins by tour
- PGA Tour: 4
- PGA Tour Champions: 4
- Other: 3

Best results in major championships
- Masters Tournament: CUT: 1996, 2008
- PGA Championship: 2nd: 2007
- U.S. Open: T23: 1996
- The Open Championship: T39: 2008

Achievements and awards
- PGA Tour Rookie of the Year: 1995

Albert Woody Austin II (born January 27, 1964) is an American professional golfer who played the majority of his career on the PGA Tour. He now plays on the PGA Tour Champions.

== Early life and amateur career ==
Austin was born in Tampa, Florida, and attended George D. Chamberlain High School, where he graduated in 1982 and was awarded best golf player in the conference. He attended the University of Miami, where he was a member of the golf team and graduated in 1986 with a degree in business administration.

== Professional career ==
In 1986, Austin turned professional. He won PGA Tour Rookie of the Year honors in 1995. He has won four times on tour: the 1995 Buick Open, the 2004 Buick Championship, the 2007 Stanford St. Jude Championship shooting a final round 62, and the 2013 Sanderson Farms Championship (where he became the 8th oldest winner in Tour history, just younger than Raymond Floyd).

During the 1997 Verizon Heritage, Austin intentionally struck his head with his putter five times. He hit his head so hard that the shaft bent.

After the second round of the 2007 PGA Championship, Austin joked that he was named after actor Woody Harrelson (Harrelson being only three years older than Austin). He went on to finish 2nd behind Tiger Woods, his best major finish. This achievement moved Austin into the top 50 of the Official World Golf Rankings. Austin's career high ranking was 29th in 2008. During the 2007 Presidents Cup, Austin fell into a pond while attempting to hit a shot with one foot in the water. This incident led to Woody's nickname "Aquaman". During his singles match against 2007 U.S. Open Champion Ángel Cabrera, he wore a pair of swimming goggles.

After struggling for years with limited PGA Tour status as a past champion, Austin won the 2013 Sanderson Farms Championship, his first PGA Tour win in six years. In that season's PGA Championship, Austin was given a four-stroke penalty for having fifteen clubs in his bag; he would miss the cut by one stroke. Although Austin didn't do well enough to earn entry into the FedEx Cup (137th after making two cuts in eight events, plus the win was an alternate event only worth 300 FedEx Cup points rather than 500), his win earned him a tour card through 2015. Despite his exemption, Austin decided to focus on the PGA Tour Champions.

In March 2016, Austin won his maiden title on the PGA Tour Champions with a one stroke victory at the Tucson Conquistadores Classic; he followed that victory up with two additional PGA Tour Champions wins in 2016. On October 21, 2018, Austin won the Dominion Energy Charity Classic. Austin closed with a three-under-par 69 on a cool day to record his fourth senior victory, but first since 2016. The tournament was held at The Country Club of Virginia in Richmond, Virginia.

== Personal life ==
Austin lives in Derby, Kansas.

== Awards and honors ==
In 2008, Austin was inducted into the University of Miami Sports Hall of Fame

== Professional wins (10) ==
=== PGA Tour wins (4) ===
No.	Date	Tournament	Winning score	Margin of victory	Runner(s)-up
1	Aug 6, 1995	Buick Open	−18 (63-68-72-67=270)	Playoff	(United States) Mike Brisky
2	Aug 29, 2004	Buick Championship	−10 (68-70-66-66=270)	Playoff	(United States) Tim Herron
3	Jun 10, 2007	Stanford St. Jude Championship	−13 (72-66-67-62=267)	5 strokes	(England) Brian Davis
4	Jul 21, 2013	Sanderson Farms Championship	−20 (69-65-67-67=268)	Playoff	(United States) Cameron Beckman, (United States) Daniel Summerhays

PGA Tour playoff record (3–1)

No.	Year	Tournament	Opponent(s)	Result
1	1995	Buick Open	(United States) Mike Brisky	Won with par on second extra hole
2	2003	MCI Heritage	(United States) Davis Love III	Lost to birdie on fourth extra hole
3	2004	Buick Championship	(United States) Tim Herron	Won with birdie on first extra hole
4	2013	Sanderson Farms Championship	(United States) Cameron Beckman, (United States) Daniel Summerhays	Won with birdie on first extra hole

=== Other wins (2) ===
- 1993 Waterloo Open Golf Classic
- 2007 Merrill Lynch Shootout (with Mark Calcavecchia)

=== PGA Tour Champions wins (4) ===
Legend
Charles Schwab Cup playoff events (1)
Other PGA Tour Champions (3)

No.	Date	Tournament	Winning score	Margin of victory	Runner-up
1	Mar 20, 2016	Tucson Conquistadores Classic	−16 (65-70-65=200)	1 stroke	(United States) Jim Carter
2	Apr 17, 2016	Mitsubishi Electric Classic	−11 (72-69-64=205)	Playoff	(United States) Wes Short Jr.
3	Apr 24, 2016	Bass Pro Shops Legends of Golf (with (United States) Michael Allen)	−23 (49-59-48=156)	1 stroke	(England) Roger Chapman and (South Africa) David Frost
4	Oct 21, 2018	Dominion Energy Charity Classic	−11 (68-68-69=205)	1 stroke	(Germany) Bernhard Langer

PGA Tour Champions playoff record (1–2)

No.	Year	Tournament	Opponent(s)	Result
1	2016	Mitsubishi Electric Classic	(United States) Wes Short Jr.	Won with par on second extra hole
2	2016	Boeing Classic	(Germany) Bernhard Langer, (United States) Kevin Sutherland	Langer won with birdie on first extra hole
3	2019	Hoag Classic	(United States) Kirk Triplett	Lost to eagle on second extra hole

=== Other senior wins (1) ===
- 2017 Diamond Resorts Invitational

== Playoff record ==
Nike Tour playoff record (0–1)

No.	Year	Tournament	Opponents	Result
1	1998	Nike Permian Basin Open	(United States) Jeff Barlow, (United States) Stiles Mitchell	Mitchell won with par on first extra hole

== Results in major championships ==
Tournament	1995	1996	1997	1998	1999
Masters Tournament		CUT			
U.S. Open		T23			
The Open Championship		CUT			
PGA Championship	T23	T69			

Tournament	2000	2001	2002	2003	2004	2005	2006	2007	2008	2009
Masters Tournament									CUT	
U.S. Open	T37		CUT	T48			T32	CUT	T71	
The Open Championship									T39	
PGA Championship				T27	T62	T66	T16	2	CUT	T36

Tournament	2010	2011	2012	2013
Masters Tournament				
U.S. Open				
The Open Championship				
PGA Championship				CUT

Top 10
Did not play

CUT = missed the halfway cut
"T" indicates a tie for a place.

=== Summary ===
Tournament	Wins	2nd	3rd	Top-5	Top-10	Top-25	Events	Cuts made
Masters Tournament	0	0	0	0	0	0	2	0
U.S. Open	0	0	0	0	0	1	7	5
The Open Championship	0	0	0	0	0	0	2	1
PGA Championship	0	1	0	1	1	3	10	8
Totals	0	1	0	1	1	4	21	14

- Most consecutive cuts made – 6 (2003 U.S. Open – 2006 PGA)
- Longest streak of top-10s – 1

== Results in The Players Championship ==
Tournament	1996	1997	1998	1999
The Players Championship	T67	CUT		

Tournament	2000	2001	2002	2003	2004	2005	2006	2007	2008	2009
The Players Championship	T61	CUT	CUT		T16	CUT	73	CUT	T21	T22

Tournament	2010	2011	2012	2013	2014
The Players Championship	T56				CUT

Did not play

CUT = missed the halfway cut
"T" indicates a tie for a place

== Results in World Golf Championships ==
Tournament	2005	2006	2007	2008	2009
Match Play				QF	
Championship				T44	
Invitational	T36		T56	T52	T15

Top 10
Did not play

QF, R16, R32, R64 = Round in which player lost in match play
"T" = tied

== Results in senior major championships ==
Results not in chronological order.

Tournament	2014	2015	2016	2017	2018	2019	2020	2021	2022	2023	2024	2025	2026
Senior PGA Championship		3	T64	CUT	T33	11	NT	T11	T29	CUT	T57	T46	CUT
The Tradition		T29		T47		T16	NT	T15	T45	T28	T75	T46	T54
U.S. Senior Open	T3	T26	T24	CUT	CUT	T11	NT	T28	CUT	T57	CUT	CUT	CUT
Senior Players Championship		T26	T25	T46	13	T7	T5	T58	T5	T27		T70	70
Senior British Open Championship		T5	T23	T15	T12	T7	NT	T28	T47				CUT

Top 10
Did not play

CUT = missed the halfway cut
"T" indicates a tie for a place
NT = no tournament due to COVID-19 pandemic

== U.S. national team appearances ==
- Presidents Cup: 2007 (winners)

== See also ==
- 1994 PGA Tour Qualifying School graduates
- 1998 Nike Tour graduates
- 2002 PGA Tour Qualifying School graduates
