= 1995 Players Championship =

Tournament information
- Dates: March 23–26, 1995
- Location: Ponte Vedra Beach, Florida; 30.198°N 81.394°W
- Courses: TPC Sawgrass, Stadium Course
- Tour: PGA Tour

Statistics
- Par: 72
- Length: 6,896 yards (6,306 m)
- Field: 149 players, 74 after cut
- Cut: 149 (+5)
- Prize fund: $3.0 million
- Winner's share: $540,000

Champion
- (United States) Lee Janzen
- 283 (−5)

Location map
- Location in the United States Location in Florida

The 1995 Players Championship was a golf tournament in Florida on the PGA Tour, held March 23–26 at TPC Sawgrass in Ponte Vedra Beach, southeast of Jacksonville. It was the 22nd Players Championship.

== Tournament summary ==
On a wind-dried course, Lee Janzen won at 283 (−5), a stroke ahead of runner-up Bernhard Langer. Janzen sank a 5-foot (1.5 m) putt for par on the final hole for the win.

Defending champion Greg Norman finished eleven strokes back, in a tie for 37th place.

== Venue ==
This was the fourteenth Players Championship held at the TPC at Sawgrass Stadium Course, and it remained at 6,896 yards (6,306 m).

== Eligibility requirements ==
The top 125 PGA Tour members from Final 1994 Official Money List.

Nick Price, Greg Norman, Mark McCumber, Tom Lehman, Fuzzy Zoeller, Loren Roberts, Corey Pavin, Jeff Maggert, Hale Irwin, Scott Hoch, Steve Lowery, Mike Springer, Bob Estes, Phil Mickelson, John Huston, Bill Glasson, Brad Bryant, David Frost, Ben Crenshaw, Tom Kite, Fred Couples, Brad Faxon, Jay Haas, Kenny Perry, Rick Fehr, Bruce Lietzke, Hal Sutton, Mark Calcavecchia, Mark Brooks, Craig Stadler, Davis Love III, David Edwards, Lee Janzen, Andrew Magee, John Cook, Kirk Triplett, Lennie Clements, Mike Heinen, Curtis Strange, Larry Mize, Tom Watson, Robert Gamez, Glen Day, Craig Parry, Blaine McCallister, Billy Andrade, Steve Stricker, Jim Gallagher Jr., Vijay Singh, Dave Barr, Gil Morgan, Jay Don Blake, Scott Simpson, Dicky Pride, Neal Lancaster, Jeff Sluman, Mike Sullivan, Donnie Hammond, Steve Elkington, Brian Henninger, Steve Pate, Clark Dennis, Brett Ogle, Fred Funk, Chip Beck, Greg Kraft, Nolan Henke, Duffy Waldorf, D. A. Weibring, Gene Sauers, Ted Tryba, Paul Goydos, Guy Boros, Russ Cochran, Jim Furyk, Jim McGovern, Bob Lohr, Gary Hallberg, Mike Hulbert, Chris DiMarco, Mark O'Meara, Colin Montgomerie, Peter Jacobsen, Bobby Wadkins, Keith Clearwater, Wayne Levi, David Ogrin, Mark Carnevale, Tom Purtzer, Jim Thorpe, Dave Stockton Jr., Scott Verplank, Brian Kamm, Mike Standly, David Feherty, Bob Burns, Doug Tewell, Robin Freeman, Michael Bradley, Dillard Pruitt, Paul Stankowski, Yoshinori Mizumaki, Ed Humenik, Fulton Allem, Brian Claar, Brandel Chamblee, Dan Forsman, Billy Mayfair, Mark McNulty, Steve Rintoul, Ken Green, John Wilson, Bob Gilder, Mike Reid, Jesper Parnevik, Joe Ozaki, John Morse, Payne Stewart, Jay Delsing, Dennis Paulson, Justin Leonard, Joel Edwards, Curt Byrum

All winners of PGA Tour events awarding official money and official victory status in the preceding 12 months concluding with the Nestle Invitational.

Designated players

Jodie Mudd, Nick Faldo, Wayne Grady, Paul Azinger, Lanny Wadkins, Rocco Mediate, Ernie Els

Any foreign player meeting the requirements of a designated player whether or not he is a PGA Tour member.

Ian Woosnam, Bernhard Langer, José María Olazábal

Winners in the last 10 calendar years of The Players Championship, Masters Tournament, U.S. Open, PGA Championship and NEC World Series of Golf.

Calvin Peete, Andy North, Hubert Green, Roger Maltbie, John Mahaffey, Jack Nicklaus, Bob Tway, Dan Pohl, Larry Nelson

British Open winners since 1990.

Ian Baker-Finch

Six players, not otherwise eligible, designated by The Players Championship Committee as "special selections."

Masashi Ozaki, Frank Nobilo, Robert Allenby, Seve Ballesteros, Sandy Lyle, David Duval

To complete a field of 144 players, those players in order, not otherwise eligible, from the 1995 Official Money List, as of the completion of the Nestle Invitational.

== Round summaries ==
=== First round ===
Thursday, March 23, 1995

Place	Player	Score	To par
1	(United States) Corey Pavin	66	−6
2	(United States) Gene Sauers	67	−5
T3	(United States) Lee Janzen	69	−3
T3	(Germany) Bernhard Langer	69	−3
T3	(United States) Larry Mize	69	−3
T3	(United States) Payne Stewart	69	−3
T3	(United States) Steve Stricker	69	−3
T8	(United States) Andrew Magee	70	−2
T8	(Australia) Greg Norman	70	−2
T10	(United States) Lennie Clements	71	−1
T10	(United States) John Cook	71	−1
T10	(United States) Tom Kite	71	−1
T10	(United States) Tom Lehman	71	−1
T10	(United States) Jeff Maggert	71	−1
T10	(United States) Billy Mayfair	71	−1
T10	(United States) Mark McCumber	71	−1
T10	(United States) Rocco Mediate	71	−1
T10	(United States) Scott Simpson	71	−1
T10	(United States) Kirk Triplett	71	−1
T10	(United States) D. A. Weibring	71	−1

=== Second round ===
Friday, March 24, 1995

Place	Player	Score	To par
T1	(United States) Corey Pavin	66-73=139	−5
T1	(United States) Gene Sauers	67-72=139	−5
T3	(Germany) Bernhard Langer	69-71=140	−4
T3	(United States) Davis Love III	73-67=140	−4
T3	(United States) Steve Stricker	79-71=140	−4
T6	(United States) Hale Irwin	73-68=141	−3
T6	(United States) D. A. Weibring	71-70=141	−3
T8	(United States) Lennie Clements	71-61=142	−2
T8	(United States) Payne Stewart	69-73=142	−2
T10	(United States) Billy Andrade	74-69=143	−1
T10	(Spain) Seve Ballesteros	75-68=143	−1
T10	(United States) Brad Bryant	72-71=143	−1
T10	(United States) Robert Gamez	74-69=143	−1
T10	(United States) Peter Jacobsen	74-69=143	−1
T10	(United States) Lee Janzen	69-74=143	−1
T10	(United States) Tom Lehman	71-72=143	−1
T10	(United States) Jeff Maggert	71-72=143	−1
T10	(United States) Scott Simpson	71-72=143	−1
T10	(United States) Tom Watson	72-71=143	−1
T10	(Wales) Ian Woosnam	74-69=143	−1

=== Third round ===
Saturday, March 25, 1995

Place	Player	Score	To par
T1	(Germany) Bernhard Langer	69-71-71=211	−5
T1	(United States) Corey Pavin	66-73-72=211	−5
3	(United States) Lee Janzen	69-74-69=212	−4
4	(United States) Payne Stewart	69-73-71=213	−3
T5	(United States) Peter Jacobsen	74-69-71=214	−2
T5	(United States) Davis Love III	73-67-74=214	−2
T5	(United States) Steve Stricker	79-71-74=214	−2
T5	(United States) D. A. Weibring	71-70-73=214	−2
T9	(United States) Brad Bryant	72-71-72=215	−1
T9	(United States) Brian Claar	74-70-71=215	−1
T9	(United States) Tom Lehman	71-72-72=215	−1
T9	(United States) Jeff Maggert	71-72-72=215	−1

=== Final round ===
Sunday, March 26, 1995

Champion
(c) = past champion

Place	Player	Score	To par	Money ($)
1	(United States) Lee Janzen	69-74-69-71=283	−5	540,000
2	(Germany) Bernhard Langer	69-71-71-73=284	−4	324,000
T3	(United States) Corey Pavin	66-73-72-74=285	−3	156,000
T3	(United States) Gene Sauers	67-72-78-68=285	−3	156,000
T3	(United States) Payne Stewart	69-73-71-72=285	−3	156,000
T6	(United States) Brad Bryant	72-71-72-71=286	−2	104,250
T6	(United States) Davis Love III (c)	73-67-74-72=286	−2	104,250
T8	(United States) Billy Andrade	74-69-73-71=287	−1	87,000
T8	(United States) Larry Mize	69-77-72-69=287	−1	87,000
T8	(Japan) Naomichi Ozaki	74-70-72-71=287	−1	87,000

Leaderboard below the top 10
Place	Player	Score	To par	Money ($)
T11	(United States) Brian Claar	74-70-71-73=288	E	69,000
T11	(United States) Scott Simpson	71-72-73-72=288	E	69,000
T11	(United States) Steve Stricker	69-71-74-74=288	E	69,000
T14	(United States) Tom Lehman	71-72-72-74=289	+1	52,500
T14	(United States) Phil Mickelson	78-66-75-70=289	+1	52,500
T14	(Scotland) Colin Montgomerie	79-70-71-69=289	+1	52,500
T14	(United States) Craig Stadler	73-73-75-68=289	+1	52,500
T18	(United States) Curt Byrum	73-71-76-70=290	+2	39,120
T18	(United States) Mark Calcavecchia	74-75-71-70=290	+2	39,120
T18	(United States) Lennie Clements	71-71-76-72=290	+2	39,120
T18	(United States) Jeff Maggert	71-72-72-75=290	+2	39,120
T18	(United States) Billy Mayfair	71-77-70-72=290	+2	39,120
T23	(United States) Jim Gallagher Jr.	74-72-73-72=291	+3	25,950
T23	(United States) Mark McCumber (c)	71-73-72-75=291	+3	25,950
T23	(Zimbabwe) Mark McNulty	76-72-71-72=291	+3	25,950
T23	(Spain) José María Olazábal	78-70-74-69=291	+3	25,950
T23	(United States) Curtis Strange	76-71-72-72=291	+3	25,950
T23	(Wales) Ian Woosnam	74-69-73-75=291	+3	25,950
T29	(United States) Michael Bradley	75-70-74-73=292	+4	19,500
T29	(United States) Fred Couples (c)	73-72-73-74=292	+4	19,500
T29	(United States) Peter Jacobsen	74-69-71-78=292	+4	19,500
T29	(Japan) Masashi Ozaki	72-72-75-73=292	+4	19,500
T29	(United States) Tom Watson	72-71-75-74=292	+4	19,500
T34	(United States) Bob Estes	76-73-75-69=293	+5	16,200
T34	(United States) Justin Leonard	73-74-72-74=293	+5	16,200
T34	(United States) Loren Roberts	73-72-72-76=293	+5	16,200
T37	(Spain) Seve Ballesteros	75-68-73-78=294	+6	13,200
T37	(South Africa) David Frost	72-74-75-73=294	+6	13,200
T37	(United States) Mike Heinen	74-75-67-78=294	+6	13,200
T37	(United States) Andrew Magee	70-75-72-77=294	+6	13,200
T37	(Australia) Greg Norman (c)	70-74-73-77=294	+6	13,200
T37	(Zimbabwe) Nick Price (c)	73-71-75-75=294	+6	13,200
T43	(United States) Bob Gilder	73-76-75-71=295	+7	9,620
T43	(United States) Tom Kite (c)	71-74-76-74=295	+7	9,620
T43	(United States) Wayne Levi	73-74-74-74=295	+7	9,620
T43	(United States) Bruce Lietzke	78-70-75-72=295	+7	9,620
T43	(Fiji) Vijay Singh	74-72-73-76=295	+7	9,620
T43	(United States) D. A. Weibring	71-70-73-81=295	+7	9,620
T49	(United States) Brad Faxon	73-74-76-73=296	+8	7,330
T49	(United States) Robert Gamez	74-69-78-75=296	+8	7,330
T49	(United States) Paul Goydos	75-74-75-72=296	+8	7,330
T49	(Sweden) Jesper Parnevik	74-74-72-76=296	+8	7,330
T49	(United States) Dicky Pride	74-73-74-75=296	+8	7,330
T49	(United States) Jeff Sluman	74-74-78-70=296	+8	7,330
T55	(United States) Hale Irwin	73-68-78-78=297	+9	6,750
T55	(United States) Bob Lohr	74-75-73-75=297	+9	6,750
T55	(United States) John Mahaffey (c)	76-73-72-76=297	+9	6,750
T55	(United States) Rocco Mediate	71-74-80-72=297	+9	6,750
T55	(United States) Kenny Perry	76-73-73-75=297	+9	6,750
T55	(United States) Fuzzy Zoeller	72-73-77-75=297	+9	6,750
T61	(United States) Chip Beck	72-75-76-75=298	+10	6,390
T61	(United States) Clark Dennis	78-71-77-72=298	+10	6,390
T61	(United States) Fred Funk	73-73-74-78=298	+10	6,390
T61	(United States) Ken Green	77-71-74-76=298	+10	6,390
T61	(United States) Nolan Henke	74-75-72-77=298	+10	6,390
T61	(United States) Bobby Wadkins	75-74-77-72=298	+10	6,390
67	(United States) Kirk Triplett	71-75-78-75=299	+11	6,180
T68	(South Africa) Ernie Els	72-72-78-78=300	+12	6,030
T68	(United States) Gil Morgan	74-74-75-77=300	+12	6,030
T68	(United States) Dan Pohl	72-74-76-78=300	+12	6,030
T68	(United States) Bob Tway	78-71-74-77=300	+12	6,030
72	(United States) Donnie Hammond	73-76-81-72=302	+14	5,880
73	(Australia) Robert Allenby	77-72-78-79=306	+18	5,820
CUT	(United States) Guy Boros	77-73=150	+6	
CUT	(United States) Rick Fehr	75-75=150	+6	
CUT	(United States) Bill Glasson	77-73=150	+6	
CUT	(United States) John Morse	76-74=150	+6	
CUT	(United States) Larry Nelson	75-75=150	+6	
CUT	(New Zealand) Frank Nobilo	75-75=150	+6	
CUT	(United States) David Ogrin	78-72=150	+6	
CUT	(United States) Mike Reid	75-75=150	+6	
CUT	(Australia) Steve Rintoul	76-74=150	+6	
CUT	(United States) Mike Standly	75-75=150	+6	
CUT	(United States) Doug Tewell	79-71=150	+6	
CUT	(United States) Duffy Waldorf	76-74=150	+6	
CUT	(United States) Jay Don Blake	76-75=151	+7	
CUT	(United States) Mark Brooks	76-75=151	+7	
CUT	(United States) Ben Crenshaw	75-76=151	+7	
CUT	(Japan) Yoshi Mizumaki	80-71=151	+7	
CUT	(Australia) Brett Ogle	80-71=151	+7	
CUT	(United States) Steve Pate	77-74=151	+7	
CUT	(United States) Hal Sutton (c)	72-79=151	+7	
CUT	(Canada) Dave Barr	73-79=152	+8	
CUT	(United States) Russ Cochran	75-77=152	+8	
CUT	(United States) Dan Forsman	75-77=152	+8	
CUT	(Australia) Wayne Grady	79-73=152	+8	
CUT	(United States) Mike Hulbert	79-73=152	+8	
CUT	(United States) Greg Kraft	74-78=152	+8	
CUT	(United States) Roger Maltbie	75-77=152	+8	
CUT	(United States) Blaine McCallister	79-73=152	+8	
CUT	(United States) Jim McGovern	73-79=152	+8	
CUT	(United States) Ted Tryba	76-76=152	+8	
CUT	(South Africa) Fulton Allem	74-79=153	+9	
CUT	(United States) Glen Day	80-73=153	+9	
CUT	(United States) Joel Edwards	80-73=153	+9	
CUT	(England) Nick Faldo	80-73=153	+9	
CUT	(United States) Robin Freeman	81-72=153	+9	
CUT	(United States) Jay Haas	76-77=153	+9	
CUT	(United States) Dennis Paulson	79-74=153	+9	
CUT	(United States) Mike Sullivan	72-81=153	+9	
CUT	(United States) Jay Delsing	82-72=154	+10	
CUT	(United States) David Edwards	74-80=154	+10	
CUT	(United States) Jim Furyk	76-78=154	+10	
CUT	(United States) John Huston	74-80=154	+10	
CUT	(United States) Scott Verplank	80-74=154	+10	
CUT	(United States) Mark Carnevale	80-75=155	+11	
CUT	(Northern Ireland) David Feherty	73-82=155	+11	
CUT	(Scotland) Sandy Lyle (c)	79-76=155	+11	
CUT	(United States) Jack Nicklaus (c)	76-79=155	+11	
CUT	(United States) Mark O'Meara	80-75=155	+11	
CUT	(Australia) Craig Parry	80-75=155	+11	
CUT	(United States) Dave Stockton Jr.	80-75=155	+11	
CUT	(United States) David Duval	78-78=156	+12	
CUT	(United States) Dillard Pruitt	72-84=156	+12	
CUT	(United States) Tom Purtzer	80-76=156	+12	
CUT	(United States) Paul Stankowski	79-77=156	+12	
CUT	(United States) John Wilson	82-74=156	+12	
CUT	(United States) Ed Humenik	75-82=157	+13	
CUT	(United States) Brian Kamm	78-79=157	+13	
CUT	(United States) Neal Lancaster	74-83=157	+13	
CUT	(United States) Andy North	77-80=157	+13	
CUT	(United States) Jim Thorpe	79-78=157	+13	
CUT	(United States) Bob Burns	83-75=158	+14	
CUT	(United States) Chris DiMarco	79-79=158	+14	
CUT	(United States) Mike Springer	79-79=158	+14	
CUT	(United States) Paul Azinger	82-77=159	+15	
CUT	(United States) Brandel Chamblee	81-78=159	+15	
CUT	(United States) Hubert Green	81-78=159	+15	
CUT	(United States) Gary Hallberg	77-82=159	+15	
CUT	(United States) Lanny Wadkins (c)	81-78=159	+15	
CUT	(United States) Keith Clearwater	81-80=161	+17	
CUT	(United States) Brian Henninger	79-82=161	+17	
CUT	(United States) Jodie Mudd (c)	80-81=161	+17	
WD	(United States) John Cook	71-73-78=222	+6	
WD	(Australia) Steve Elkington (c)	76	+4	
WD	(United States) Scott Hoch	82	+10	
WD	(Australia) Ian Baker-Finch	85	+13	
WD	(United States) Calvin Peete (c)	85	+13	
DQ	(United States) Steve Lowery	81	+9	
