= Mitsubishi Electric Classic =

Coordinates: 33.998°N 84.109°W

Tournament information
- Location: Duluth, Georgia
- Established: 2013
- Course: TPC Sugarloaf
- Par: 72
- Length: 7,179 yards (6,564 m)
- Tour: PGA Tour Champions
- Format: Stroke play
- Prize fund: US$2,000,000
- Month played: April

Tournament record score
- Aggregate: 196 Jerry Kelly (2025)
- To par: −20 as above
- Score: 39 points Retief Goosen (2026)

Current champion
- (South Africa) Retief Goosen

Final champion
- Location in the United States Location in Georgia

The Mitsubishi Electric Classic is a golf tournament on the PGA Tour Champions in Georgia in the greater Atlanta area. It debuted thirteen years ago in 2013 as the "Greater Gwinnett Championship," and has been played each year at TPC Sugarloaf in Duluth, a northeast suburb. A familiar course, TPC Sugarloaf was a venue on the PGA Tour for twelve seasons (1997–2008) for the AT&T Classic (previously BellSouth Classic).

The purse in 2019 was $1.8 million, with a winner's share of $270,000.

The Champions Tour tournament in 2020 was cancelled due to the COVID-19 pandemic, although the LocaliQ Series Championship was held in its place in November.

== Winners ==
Year	Winner	Score	To par	Margin of victory	Runner(s)-up	Purse ($)
Mitsubishi Electric Classic
2026	(South Africa) Retief Goosen	39 points		2 points	(Canada) Stephen Ames	2,000,000
2025	(United States) Jerry Kelly	196	−20	1 stroke	(South Africa) Ernie Els	2,000,000
2024	(Canada) Stephen Ames (3)	202	−14	4 strokes	(United States) Doug Barron (England) Paul Broadhurst	2,000,000
2023	(Canada) Stephen Ames (2)	197	−19	4 strokes	(Spain) Miguel Ángel Jiménez	1,800,000
2022	(United States) Steve Flesch (2)	205	−11	1 stroke	(United States) Fred Couples (Republic of Ireland) Pádraig Harrington (United States) David Toms	1,800,000
2021	(United States) Dicky Pride	205	−11	3 strokes	(Canada) Stephen Ames (United States) Paul Goydos (United States) Kirk Triplett	1,800,000
2020	Replaced by the LocaliQ Series Tour Championship					
2019	(United States) Scott McCarron	209	−7	2 strokes	(United States) Joe Durant (United States) Kent Jones (United States) Jerry Kelly (United States) Kirk Triplett	1,800,000
2018	(United States) Steve Flesch	205	−11	Playoff	(Germany) Bernhard Langer (United States) Scott Parel	1,800,000
2017	(Canada) Stephen Ames	201	−15	4 strokes	(Germany) Bernhard Langer	1,800,000
2016	(United States) Woody Austin	205	−11	Playoff	(United States) Wes Short Jr.	1,800,000
Greater Gwinnett Championship
2015	(United States) Olin Browne	132 (Note: Shortened to 36 holes due to rain.)	−12	1 stroke	(Germany) Bernhard Langer	1,800,000
2014	(Spain) Miguel Ángel Jiménez	202	−14	2 strokes	(Germany) Bernhard Langer	1,800,000
2013	(Germany) Bernhard Langer	206	−10	3 strokes	(United States) Tom Lehman (United States) Tom Pernice Jr.	1,800,000
