= 2013 Champions Tour =

Golf tour season

2013 Champions Tour season
- Duration: January 18, 2013 – November 3, 2013
- Number of official events: 26
- Most wins: (United States) Kenny Perry (5)
- Charles Schwab Cup: (United States) Kenny Perry
- Money list: (Germany) Bernhard Langer
- Player of the Year: (United States) Kenny Perry
- Rookie of the Year: (United States) Rocco Mediate

The 2013 Champions Tour was the 34th season of the Champions Tour (formerly the Senior PGA Tour), the main professional golf tour in the United States for men aged 50 and over.

== Schedule ==
The following table lists official events during the 2013 season.

Date	Tournament	Location	Purse (US$)	Winner (Note: The number in parentheses after each winner's name is the number of Champions Tour events they had won up to and including that tournament. This information is only shown for Champions Tour members.)	Notes
Jan 20	Mitsubishi Electric Championship at Hualalai	Hawaii	1,800,000	(United States) John Cook (9)	
Feb 10	Allianz Championship	Florida	1,800,000	(United States) Rocco Mediate (1)	
Feb 17	ACE Group Classic	Florida	1,600,000	(Germany) Bernhard Langer (17)	
Mar 17	Toshiba Classic	California	1,750,000	(South Africa) David Frost (4)	
Mar 24	Mississippi Gulf Resort Classic	Mississippi	1,600,000	(United States) Michael Allen (4)	
Apr 21	Greater Gwinnett Championship	Georgia	1,800,000	(Germany) Bernhard Langer (18)	New tournament
Apr 28	Liberty Mutual Insurance Legends of Golf	Georgia	2,700,000	(United States) Brad Faxon (2) and (United States) Jeff Sluman (5)	Team event
May 5	Insperity Championship	Texas	1,800,000	(Mexico) Esteban Toledo (1)	
May 26	Senior PGA Championship	Missouri	2,100,000	(Japan) Kōki Idoki (1)	Senior major championship
Jun 2	Principal Charity Classic	Iowa	1,750,000	(United States) Russ Cochran (4)	
Jun 9	Regions Tradition	Alabama	2,200,000	(South Africa) David Frost (5)	Champions Tour major championship
Jun 23	Encompass Championship	Illinois	1,800,000	(United States) Craig Stadler (9)	
Jun 30	Constellation Senior Players Championship	Pennsylvania	2,700,000	(United States) Kenny Perry (3)	Champions Tour major championship
Jul 14	U.S. Senior Open	Nebraska	2,750,000	(United States) Kenny Perry (4)	Senior major championship
Jul 29	The Senior Open Championship	England	2,000,000	(United States) Mark Wiebe (4)	Senior major championship
Aug 4	3M Championship	Minnesota	1,750,000	(United States) Tom Pernice Jr. (2)	
Aug 18	Dick's Sporting Goods Open	New York	1,800,000	(United States) Bart Bryant (1)	
Aug 25	Boeing Classic	Washington	2,000,000	(United States) John Riegger (1)	
Sep 1	Shaw Charity Classic	Canada	2,000,000	(United States) Rocco Mediate (2)	New tournament
Sep 8	Montreal Championship	Canada	1,600,000	(Mexico) Esteban Toledo (2)	
Sep 22	Pacific Links Hawai'i Championship	Hawaii	1,800,000	(United States) Mark Wiebe (5)	
Sep 29	Nature Valley First Tee Open at Pebble Beach	California	1,800,000	(United States) Kirk Triplett (2)	
Oct 13	SAS Championship	North Carolina	2,100,000	(United States) Russ Cochran (5)	
Oct 20	Greater Hickory Kia Classic at Rock Barn	North Carolina	1,600,000	(United States) Michael Allen (5)	
Oct 27	AT&T Championship	Texas	1,900,000	(United States) Kenny Perry (5)	
Nov 3	Charles Schwab Cup Championship	California	2,500,000	(United States) Fred Couples (9)	Tour Championship

=== Unofficial events ===
The following events were sanctioned by the Champions Tour, but did not carry official money, nor were wins official.

Date	Tournament	Location	Purse ($)	Winners	Notes
Dec 15	PNC Father-Son Challenge	Florida	1,085,000	(United States) Stewart Cink and son Connor Cink	Team event

== Charles Schwab Cup ==
The Charles Schwab Cup was based on tournament results during the season, calculated using a points-based system.

Position	Player	Points
1	(United States) Kenny Perry	3,273
2	(Germany) Bernhard Langer	2,861
3	(United States) Fred Couples	2,425
4	(South Africa) David Frost	2,089
5	(United States) Duffy Waldorf	1,673

== Money list ==
The money list was based on prize money won during the season, calculated in U.S. dollars.

Position	Player	Prize money ($)
1	(Germany) Bernhard Langer	2,448,428
2	(United States) Kenny Perry	2,241,188
3	(South Africa) David Frost	1,817,234
4	(United States) Fred Couples	1,706,812
5	(United States) Russ Cochran	1,458,583

== Awards ==
Award	Winner	Ref.
Player of the Year (Jack Nicklaus Trophy)	(United States) Kenny Perry	
Rookie of the Year	(United States) Rocco Mediate	
Scoring leader (Byron Nelson Award)	(United States) Fred Couples	
