= 2013 Senior Open Championship =

Tournament information
- Dates: 25–28 July 2013
- Location: Southport, England; 53.622°N 3.0333°W
- Course: Royal Birkdale Golf Club
- Organised by: The R&A
- Tours: European Senior Tour; Champions Tour
- Format: 72 holes stroke play

Statistics
- Par: 70
- Length: 7,082 yards (6,476 m)
- Field: 144 players, 74 after cut
- Cut: 148 (+8)
- Prize fund: US$2,000,000
- Winner's share: US$315,600

Champion
- (United States) Mark Wiebe
- 271 (−9)

Location map
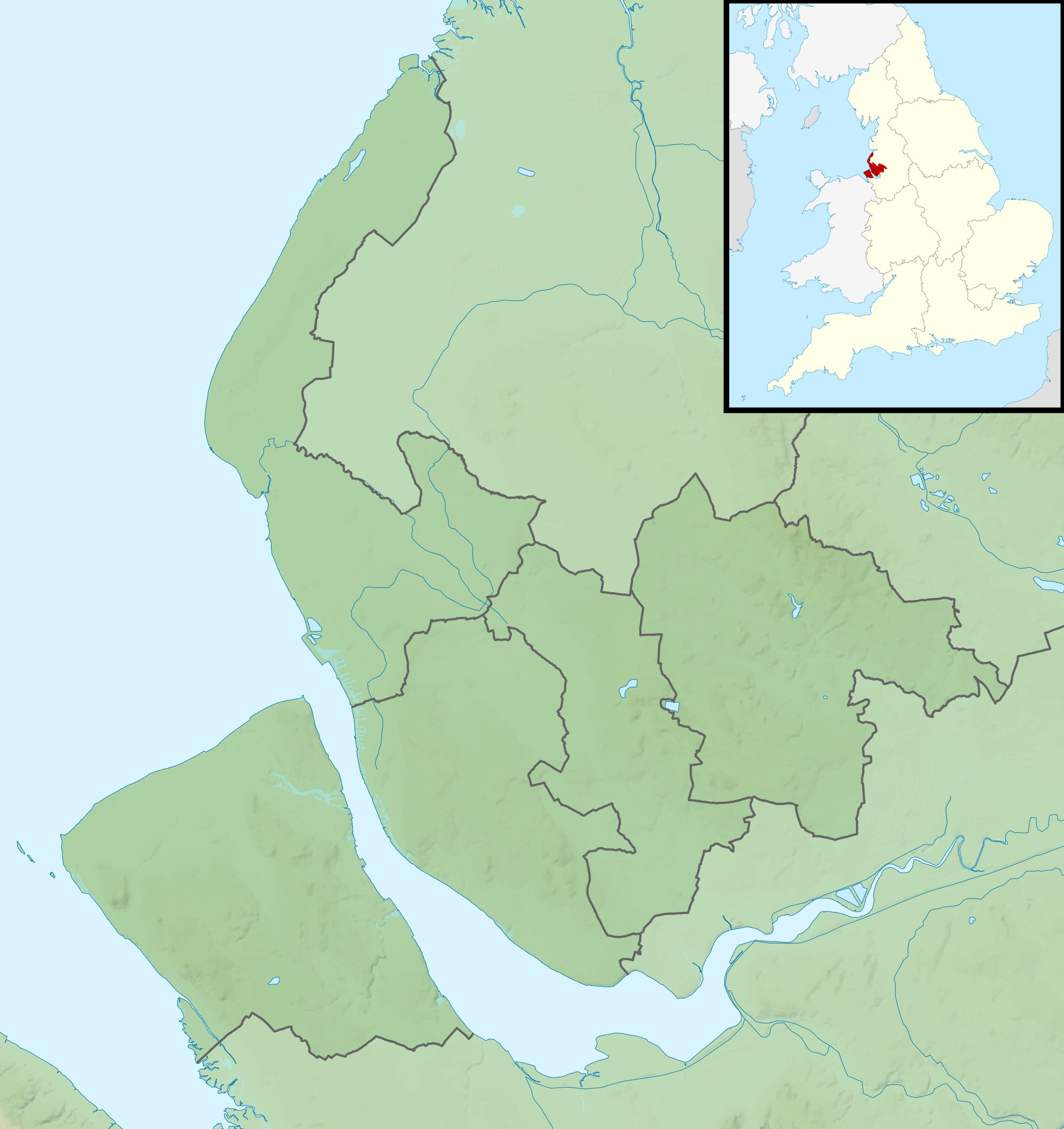
- Location in Europe Location on the British Isles Location in EnglandLocation in Merseyside Location in Southport Royal Birkdale GC (Southport)

The 2013 Senior Open Championship was a senior major golf championship and the 27th Senior Open Championship, held on 25–28 July at Royal Birkdale Golf Club in Southport, England, United Kingdom. It was the 11th Senior Open Championship played as a senior major championship.

Mark Wiebe won after a play-off over Bernhard Langer In the first Monday finish in Senior Open Championship history. It was Wiebe's first senior major championship victory.

== Venue ==
The event was the first Senior Open Championship played at Royal Birkdale Golf Club. The Open Championship had previously been held there nine times, the first time being in 1954.

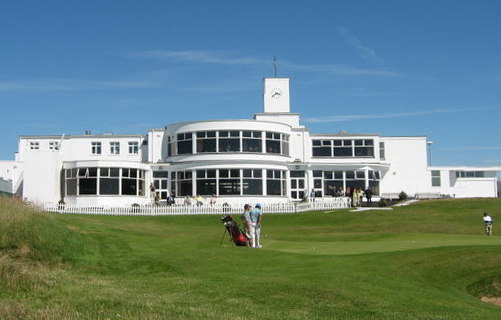
Royal Birkdale GC clubhouse

=== Course layout ===
Hole	Yards	Par	Hole	Yards	Par
1	449	4	10	408	4
2	421	4	11	417	4
3	451	4	12	184	3
4	201	3	13	499	4
5	346	4	14	191	3
6	480	4	15	544	5
7	178	3	16	396	4
8	457	4	17	572	5
9	414	4	18	474	4
Out	3,397	34	In	3,685	36
Source:		Total		7,082	70

== Field ==
The field consisted of 144 competitors; professionals and amateurs.

An 18-hole stroke play qualifying round was held on Monday, 22 July, for players who were not already exempt. The leading players from the qualifying competition joined the exempt players for the championship.

74 players made the 36-hole cut, 73 professionals and one amateur, Chip Lutz, who finished leading amateur at tied 48th.

=== Past champions in the field ===
Six past Senior Open champions participated. Five of them made the 36-hole cut; 2010 champion Bernhard Langer (2nd), 2011 champion Russ Cochran (tied 14st), 2012 champion Fred Couples (tied 21st), 2003, 2005 and 2007 champion Tom Watson (tied 36th) and Bruce Vaughan (tied 55th). 2002 champion Noboru Sugai did not make the cut.

=== Past winners of The Open Championship in the field ===
The field included five former winners of The Open Championship. They all made the cut; 1985 Open champion Sandy Lyle (tied 7th), 1996 Open champion Tom Lehman (tied 26th), 1998 Open champion Mark O'Meara (tied 26th), 1975, 1977, 1980, 1982 and 1983 Open champion Tom Watson (tied 36h) and 1989 Open champion Mark Calcavecchia (tied 65th).

== Final round and playoff summaries ==
=== Final round ===
Sunday, 28 July 2013

Bernhard Langer needed a bogey on the 18th hole to win by one shot, but after leaving his approach shot in the green side bunker, he took four shots to get in the hole for a double bogey 6. Defending champion Fred Couples tied for 21st.

Place	Player	Score	To par	Money ($)
T1	(Germany) Bernhard Langer	68-67-66-70=271	−9	Playoff
T1	(United States) Mark Wiebe	70-65-70-66=271	−9	Playoff
T3	(South Africa) David Frost	68-68-68-70=274	−6	97,813
T3	(United States) Corey Pavin	69-71-69-65=274	−6	97,813
T3	(Australia) Peter Senior	68-71-69-66=274	−6	97,813
6	(Australia) Peter Fowler	69-68-70-69=276	−4	66,280
7	(Scotland) Sandy Lyle	70-68-69-70=277	−3	56,800
T8	(United States) Jeff Hart	69-69-73-67=278	−2	44,870
T8	(United States) Tom Pernice Jr.	70-72-70-66=278	−2	44,870
10	(United States) Gene Sauers	67-70-70-72=279	−1	37,820

=== Playoff ===
Sunday, 28 July and Monday 29 July 2013

Mark Wiebe and Bernhard Langer began a sudden death playoff on Sunday evening, playing the 18th hole all over again until one of them had a lower score on the hole. After playing the hole twice, play was suspended at 9.41 pm due to darkness and continued at 8 am the next day. Wiebe won with par on the fifth playoff hole as Langer made bogey.

Place	Player	Score	To par	Money (€)
1	(United States) Mark Wiebe	4-4-4-5-4=21	+1	315,600
2	(Germany) Bernhard Langer	4-4-4-5-5=22	+2	210,500

Preceded by 2013 U.S. Senior Open	Senior Major Championships	Succeeded by 2014 Regions Tradition
