= TPC Michigan =

Private golf club

- Interactive map of TPC Michigan
- 42.30°N 83.20°W

Club information
- Location: Dearborn, Michigan
- Established: 1990
- Type: Private
- Owner: Club Corp
- Operator: Club Corp
- Tota holes: 18
- Tournaments: Senior Players Championship (1991–2006)
- Website: http://www.tpcmichigan.com
- Designed by: Jack Nicklaus
- Par: 72
- Length: 7,071 yards
- Course rating: 75.1
- Slope rating: 148

TPC Michigan is a private golf club located in Dearborn, Michigan and owned by Invited Clubs.

The Jack Nicklaus designed championship golf course is a member of the Tournament Players Club network, which is operated by the PGA Tour. In 2007, the facility was sold to the Heritage Golf Group, but retained its TPC branding under a licensing agreement. In April 2014, TPC Michigan was sold to ClubCorp (Invited clubs).

Between 1991 and 2006 TPC Michigan hosted the Ford Senior Players Championship, a Champions Tour event and one of senior men's golf's major championships.

TPC Michigan
Tee	Rating/Slope	1	2	3	4	5	6	7	8	9	Out	10	11	12	13	14	15	16	17	18	In	Total
TPC	75.1 / 148	408	411	577	210	394	340	561	182	432	3515	398	410	166	519	455	192	410	556	450	3556	7071
Blue	72.7 / 145	390	383	541	182	360	317	542	160	400	3275	380	379	143	506	429	171	376	521	417	3322	6597
White	70.0 / 135	367	363	514	161	316	295	515	140	372	3043	348	344	126	476	407	149	342	492	394	3078	6121
SI	Men's	14	8	2	16	12	10	4	18	6		13	7	17	9	1	15	11	3	5
Par		4	4	5	3	4	4	5	3	4	36	4	4	3	5	4	3	4	5	4	36	72
Green/White	68.4 / 130	313	309	514	144	316	295	515	140	333	2879	348	315	126	476	338	149	303	492	348	2895	5774
Green	71.5 / 127	313	309	346	144	267	252	426	112	333	2582	295	315	81	400	338	98	303	460	348	2638	5220
SI	Ladies'	14	6	2	18	12	10	4	16	8		9	7	17	13	3	15	11	1	5
