= 2018 PGA Tour Champions season =

Golf tour season

- Duration: January 18, 2019 – November 11, 2018
- Number of official events: 27
- Most wins: (England) Paul Broadhurst (3) (Fiji) Vijay Singh (3) (United States) Steve Stricker (3)
- Charles Schwab Cup: (Germany) Bernhard Langer
- Money list: (Germany) Bernhard Langer
- Player of the Year: (West Germany) Bernhard Langer
- Rookie of the Year: (United States) Ken Tanigawa

The 2018 PGA Tour Champions season was the 39th season of PGA Tour Champions (formerly the Senior PGA Tour and the Champions Tour), the main professional golf tour in the United States for men aged 50 and over.

== Schedule ==
The following table lists official events during the 2018 season.

Date	Tournament	Location	Purse (US$)	Winner (Note: The number in parentheses after each winner's name is the number of PGA Tour Champions events they had won up to and including that tournament. This information is only shown for PGA Tour Champions members.)	Notes
Jan 20	Mitsubishi Electric Championship at Hualalai	Hawaii	1,800,000	(United States) Jerry Kelly (3)	
Feb 11	Boca Raton Championship	Florida	1,600,000	(United States) Mark Calcavecchia (4)	
Feb 18	Chubb Classic	Florida	1,600,000	(United States) Joe Durant (3)	
Mar 4	Cologuard Classic	Arizona	1,700,000	(United States) Steve Stricker (1)	
Mar 11	Toshiba Classic	California	1,800,000	(Fiji) Vijay Singh (2)	
Mar 25	Rapiscan Systems Classic	Mississippi	1,600,000	(United States) Steve Stricker (2)	
Apr 15	Mitsubishi Electric Classic	Georgia	1,800,000	(United States) Steve Flesch (1)	
Apr 22	Bass Pro Shops Legends of Golf	Missouri	1,800,000	(England) Paul Broadhurst (3) and (United States) Kirk Triplett (6)	Team event
May 6	Insperity Invitational	Texas	2,200,000	(Germany) Bernhard Langer (37)	
May 20	Regions Tradition	Alabama	2,400,000	(Spain) Miguel Ángel Jiménez (5)	PGA Tour Champions major championship
May 27	KitchenAid Senior PGA Championship	Michigan	3,000,000	(England) Paul Broadhurst (4)	Senior major championship
Jun 10	Principal Charity Classic	Iowa	1,750,000	(United States) Tom Lehman (11)	
Jun 24	American Family Insurance Championship	Wisconsin	2,000,000	(United States) Scott McCarron (7)	
Jul 1	U.S. Senior Open	Colorado	4,000,000	(United States) David Toms (1)	Senior major championship
Jul 15	Constellation Senior Players Championship	Illinois	2,800,000	(Fiji) Vijay Singh (3)	PGA Tour Champions major championship
Jul 29	The Senior Open Championship	Scotland	2,000,000	(Spain) Miguel Ángel Jiménez (6)	Senior major championship
Aug 5	3M Championship	Minnesota	1,750,000	(United States) Kenny Perry (10)	
Aug 19	Dick's Sporting Goods Open	New York	2,050,000	(United States) Bart Bryant (2)	
Aug 26	Boeing Classic	Washington	2,100,000	(United States) Scott Parel (1)	
Sep 2	Shaw Charity Classic	Canada	2,350,000	(United States) Scott McCarron (8)	
Sep 16	The Ally Challenge	Michigan	2,000,000	(England) Paul Broadhurst (5)	New tournament
Sep 23	Sanford International	South Dakota	1,800,000	(United States) Steve Stricker (3)	New tournament
Sep 30	PURE Insurance Championship	California	2,100,000	(United States) Ken Tanigawa (1)	
Oct 14	SAS Championship	North Carolina	2,100,000	(Germany) Bernhard Langer (38)	
Oct 21	Dominion Energy Charity Classic	Virginia	2,000,000	(United States) Woody Austin (4)	Charles Schwab Cup playoff event
Oct 28	Invesco QQQ Championship	California	2,000,000	(United States) Scott Parel (2)	Charles Schwab Cup playoff event
Nov 11	Charles Schwab Cup Championship	Arizona	2,500,000	(Fiji) Vijay Singh (4)	Charles Schwab Cup playoff event

=== Unofficial events ===
The following events were sanctioned by PGA Tour Champions, but did not carry official money, nor were wins official.

Date	Tournament	Location	Purse ($)	Winner(s)	Notes
Jan 14	Diamond Resorts Invitational	Florida	760,000	(United States) Scott Parel	
Dec 16	PNC Father-Son Challenge	Florida	1,085,000	(United States) Davis Love III and son Dru Love	Team event

== Charles Schwab Cup ==
The Charles Schwab Cup was based on tournament results during the season, calculated using a points-based system.

Position	Player	Points
1	(Germany) Bernhard Langer	2,525,404
2	(United States) Scott McCarron	2,256,618
3	(United States) Scott Parel	2,254,856
4	(Fiji) Vijay Singh	2,237,619
5	(Spain) Miguel Ángel Jiménez	2,038,918

== Money list ==
The money list was based on prize money won during the season, calculated in U.S. dollars.

Position	Player	Prize money ($)
1	(Germany) Bernhard Langer	2,222,154
2	(United States) Scott McCarron	2,008,618
3	(Spain) Miguel Ángel Jiménez	1,939,093
4	(United States) Jerry Kelly	1,922,495
5	(United States) Scott Parel	1,854,190

== Awards ==
Award	Winner	Ref.
Player of the Year (Jack Nicklaus Trophy)	(Germany) Bernhard Langer	
Rookie of the Year	(United States) Ken Tanigawa	
Scoring leader (Byron Nelson Award)	(Germany) Bernhard Langer	
