= Dominion Energy Charity Classic =

American professional golf tournament

Coordinates: 37.3413°N 77.3641°W

Tournament information
- Location: Henrico, Virginia, U.S.
- Established: 2016
- Course: Country Club of Virginia
- Par: 72
- Length: 7,025 yards (6,424 m)
- Tour: PGA Tour Champions
- Format: Stroke play
- Prize fund: US$2,300,000
- Month played: October

Tournament record score
- Aggregate: 198 Miguel Ángel Jiménez (2019)
- To par: −18 as above

Current champion
- (United States) Justin Leonard

Final champion
- Location in the United States Location in Virginia

The Dominion Energy Charity Classic is a professional golf tournament in Virginia on the PGA Tour Champions, played at Country Club of Virginia in Henrico, Virginia. The inaugural edition was in November 2016. The event features a 72-player field competing for a $2.2 million purse, and is a no-cut 54-hole event.

Dominion Energy plans to end their partnership with the tournament after the 2025 event. The event's survival is dependent on sponsors.

== Winners ==
PGA Tour Champions (Charles Schwab Cup Playoffs)	2016–2019, 2021–
PGA Tour Champions (Regular)	2020

#	Year	Winner	Score	To par	Margin of victory	Runner-up	Ref.
Dominion Energy Charity Classic
10th	2025	(United States) Justin Leonard	204	−12	1 stroke	(Denmark) Thomas Bjørn (South Africa) Ernie Els	
9th	2024	(United States) Timothy O'Neal	203	−13	2 strokes	(Argentina) Ricardo González	
8th	2023	(United States) Harrison Frazar	205	−11	Playoff	(Australia) Richard Green	
7th	2022	(New Zealand) Steven Alker	202	−14	1 stroke	(South Korea) K. J. Choi	
6th	2021	(Germany) Bernhard Langer (2)	202	−14	Playoff	(United States) Doug Barron	
5th	2020	(United States) Phil Mickelson	199	−17	3 strokes	(Canada) Mike Weir	
4th	2019	(Spain) Miguel Ángel Jiménez	198	−18	2 strokes	(United States) Tommy Tolles	
3rd	2018	(United States) Woody Austin	205	−11	1 stroke	(Germany) Bernhard Langer	
Dominion Charity Classic
2nd	2017	(Germany) Bernhard Langer	200	−16	1 stroke	(United States) Scott Verplank	
1st	2016	(United States) Scott McCarron	203	−13	Playoff	(United States) Tom Byrum	
