= 1995 PGA Tour =

Golf tour season

1995 PGA Tour season
- Duration: January 5, 1995 – October 29, 1995
- Number of official events: 44
- Most wins: (United States) Lee Janzen (3) (Australia) Greg Norman (3)
- Money list: (Australia) Greg Norman
- PGA Tour Player of the Year: (Australia) Greg Norman
- PGA Player of the Year: (Australia) Greg Norman
- Rookie of the Year: (United States) Woody Austin

The 1995 PGA Tour was the 80th season of the PGA Tour, the main professional golf tour in the United States. It was also the 27th season since separating from the PGA of America.

== Schedule ==
The following table lists official events during the 1995 season.

Date	Tournament	Location	Purse (US$)	Winner (Note: The number in parentheses after each winner's name is the number of PGA Tour events they had won up to and including that tournament. This information is only shown for PGA Tour members.)	OWGR points	Notes
Jan 8	Mercedes Championships	California	1,000,000	(Australia) Steve Elkington (5)	46	Winners-only event
Jan 15	United Airlines Hawaiian Open	Hawaii	1,200,000	(United States) John Morse (1)	42	
Jan 22	Northern Telecom Open	Arizona	1,250,000	(United States) Phil Mickelson (5)	46	
Jan 29	Phoenix Open	Arizona	1,300,000	(Fiji) Vijay Singh (2)	52	
Feb 5	AT&T Pebble Beach National Pro-Am	California	1,400,000	(United States) Peter Jacobsen (5)	52	Pro-Am
Feb 12	Buick Invitational of California	California	1,200,000	(United States) Peter Jacobsen (6)	46	
Feb 19	Bob Hope Chrysler Classic	California	1,200,000	(United States) Kenny Perry (3)	40	Pro-Am
Feb 26	Nissan Open	California	1,200,000	(United States) Corey Pavin (12)	46	
Mar 5	Doral-Ryder Open	Florida	1,500,000	(England) Nick Faldo (7)	60	
Mar 12	Honda Classic	Florida	1,200,000	(United States) Mark O'Meara (9)	52	
Mar 19	Nestle Invitational	Florida	1,200,000	(United States) Loren Roberts (2)	74	Invitational
Mar 26	The Players Championship	Florida	3,000,000	(United States) Lee Janzen (5)	80	Flagship event
Apr 2	Freeport-McMoRan Classic	Louisiana	1,200,000	(United States) Davis Love III (9)	40	
Apr 9	Masters Tournament	Georgia	2,200,000	(United States) Ben Crenshaw (19)	100	Major championship
Apr 16	MCI Classic	South Carolina	1,300,000	(United States) Bob Tway (7)	64	Invitational
Apr 23	KMart Greater Greensboro Open	North Carolina	1,500,000	(United States) Jim Gallagher Jr. (4)	46	
Apr 30	Shell Houston Open	Texas	1,400,000	(United States) Payne Stewart (9)	44	
May 7	BellSouth Classic	Georgia	1,300,000	(United States) Mark Calcavecchia (8)	44	
May 14	GTE Byron Nelson Golf Classic	Texas	1,300,000	(South Africa) Ernie Els (2)	52	
May 21	Buick Classic	New York	1,200,000	(Fiji) Vijay Singh (3)	44	
May 28	Colonial National Invitation	Texas	1,400,000	(United States) Tom Lehman (2)	62	Invitational
Jun 4	Memorial Tournament	Ohio	1,700,000	(Australia) Greg Norman (15)	70	Invitational
Jun 11	Kemper Open	Maryland	1,400,000	(United States) Lee Janzen (6)	56	
Jun 18	U.S. Open	New York	2,000,000	(United States) Corey Pavin (13)	100	Major championship
Jun 25	Canon Greater Hartford Open	Connecticut	1,200,000	(Australia) Greg Norman (16)	44	
Jul 2	FedEx St. Jude Classic	Tennessee	1,250,000	(United States) Jim Gallagher Jr. (5)	44	
Jul 9	Motorola Western Open	Illinois	2,000,000	(United States) Billy Mayfair (2)	58	
Jul 16	Anheuser-Busch Golf Classic	Virginia	1,100,000	(United States) Ted Tryba (1)	28	
Jul 23	The Open Championship	Scotland	£1,250,000	(United States) John Daly (4)	100	Major championship
Jul 23	Deposit Guaranty Golf Classic	Mississippi	700,000	(United States) Ed Dougherty (1)	20	Alternate event
Jul 30	Ideon Classic at Pleasant Valley	Massachusetts	1,000,000	(United States) Fred Funk (2)	32	
Aug 6	Buick Open	Michigan	1,200,000	(United States) Woody Austin (1)	48	
Aug 13	PGA Championship	California	2,000,000	(Australia) Steve Elkington (6)	100	Major championship
Aug 20	Sprint International	Colorado	1,500,000	(United States) Lee Janzen (7)	54	
Aug 27	NEC World Series of Golf	Ohio	2,000,000	(Australia) Greg Norman (17)	60	Limited-field event
Sep 3	Greater Milwaukee Open	Wisconsin	1,000,000	(United States) Scott Hoch (6)	40	
Sep 10	Bell Canadian Open	Canada	1,300,000	(United States) Mark O'Meara (10)	44	
Sep 17	B.C. Open	New York	1,000,000	(United States) Hal Sutton (8)	30	
Sep 24	Quad City Classic	Illinois	1,000,000	(United States) D. A. Weibring (4)	44	
Oct 1	Buick Challenge	Georgia	1,000,000	(United States) Fred Funk (3)	40	
Oct 8	Walt Disney World/Oldsmobile Classic	Florida	1,200,000	(United States) Brad Bryant (1)	30	
Oct 15	Las Vegas Invitational	Nevada	1,500,000	(United States) Jim Furyk (1)	44	
Oct 22	LaCantera Texas Open	Texas	1,100,000	(United States) Duffy Waldorf (1)	40	
Oct 29	The Tour Championship	Oklahoma	3,000,000	(United States) Billy Mayfair (3)	58	Tour Championship

=== Unofficial events ===
The following events were sanctioned by the PGA Tour, but did not carry official money, nor were wins official.

Date	Tournament	Location	Purse ($)	Winner(s)	OWGR points	Notes
Sep 24	Ryder Cup	New York	n/a	Team Europe	n/a	Team event
Nov 5	Sarazen World Open	Georgia	1,900,000	(New Zealand) Frank Nobilo	32	
Nov 5	Lincoln-Mercury Kapalua International	Hawaii	1,000,000	(United States) Jim Furyk	34	
Nov 8	MasterCard PGA Grand Slam of Golf	Hawaii	1,000,000	(United States) Ben Crenshaw	n/a	Limited-field event
Nov 12	World Cup of Golf	China	1,300,000	(United States) Fred Couples and (United States) Davis Love III	n/a	Team event
Nov 12	World Cup of Golf Individual Trophy	China	200,000	(United States) Davis Love III	n/a	
Nov 19	Franklin Templeton Shark Shootout	California	1,100,000	(United States) Mark Calcavecchia and (Australia) Steve Elkington	n/a	Team event
Nov 26	Skins Game	California	540,000	(United States) Fred Couples	n/a	Limited-field event
Dec 3	JCPenney Classic	Florida	1,300,000	(United States) Beth Daniel and (United States) Davis Love III	n/a	Team event
Dec 10	Diners Club Matches	California	890,000	(United States) Tom Lehman and (United States) Duffy Waldorf	n/a	Team event
Dec 31	Andersen Consulting World Championship of Golf	Arizona	3,650,000	(England) Barry Lane	48	New tournament Limited-field event

== Money list ==
The money list was based on prize money won during the season, calculated in U.S. dollars.

Position	Player	Prize money ($)
1	(Australia) Greg Norman	1,654,959
2	(United States) Billy Mayfair	1,543,192
3	(United States) Lee Janzen	1,378,966
4	(United States) Corey Pavin	1,340,079
5	(Australia) Steve Elkington	1,254,352
6	(United States) Davis Love III	1,111,999
7	(United States) Peter Jacobsen	1,075,057
8	(United States) Jim Gallagher Jr.	1,057,241
9	(Fiji) Vijay Singh	1,018,713
10	(United States) Mark O'Meara	914,129

== Awards ==
Award	Winner	Ref.
PGA Tour Player of the Year (Jack Nicklaus Trophy)	(Australia) Greg Norman	
PGA Player of the Year	(Australia) Greg Norman	
Rookie of the Year	(United States) Woody Austin	
Scoring leader (PGA Tour – Byron Nelson Award)	(Australia) Greg Norman	
Scoring leader (PGA – Vardon Trophy)	(Australia) Steve Elkington	
Comeback Player of the Year	(United States) Bob Tway	

== See also ==
- 1995 Nike Tour
- 1995 Senior PGA Tour
