= Senior Players Championship =

Major championship on golf's PGA Tour Champions

Coordinates: 41.008°N 81.508°W

Kaulig Companies Championship
Tournament information
- Location: Akron, Ohio
- Established: 1983
- Courses: Firestone Country Club (South Course)
- Par: 70
- Length: 7,248 yards (6,628 m)
- Tour: PGA Tour Champions
- Format: Stroke play
- Prize fund: US$3,500,000
- Month played: July

Tournament record score
- Aggregate: 261 Jack Nicklaus (1990); 261 Kenny Perry (2013)
- Score: −27 Jack Nicklaus (1990)

Current champion
- (United States) Zach Johnson

Final champion
- Location in the United States Location in Ohio

The Kaulig Companies Championship, formerly known as the Senior Players Championship, stylised by the PGA Tour as The SENIOR PLAYERS, is one of the five major championships on golf's PGA Tour Champions. The inaugural event was played 43 years ago in 1983 and the age minimum is 50, the standard for men's senior professional golf tournaments.

The winner gains entry into the following season's Players Championship on the PGA Tour (although Retief Goosen, the 2019 winner, was not allowed to play in the official subsequent Players Championship). In 2022, businessman Matt Kaulig, whose enterprises include LeafFilter and a NASCAR team, took over title sponsorship of the event, renaming it the Kaulig Companies Championship.

Unlike the U.S. Senior Open, the Senior PGA Championship, and the Senior Open Championship, it is not recognized as a major by the European Senior Tour, and is not part of that tour's schedule.

Since 2019, the Senior Players championship has been held at the South course of the Firestone Country Club in Akron, Ohio; it replaced the WGC-Bridgestone Invitational that had been held there before moving to Memphis, Tennessee. The championship will move to Newport Beach Country Club in Newport Beach, California, in 2027.

The Senior Players Championship is the oldest continuously running major of senior golf's five majors, having been held annually since 1983. The other majors have had years where there has been a year without a tournament.

== Course layout ==
Hole	1	2	3	4	5	6	7	8	9	Out	10	11	12	13	14	15	16	17	18	In	Total
Yards	399	526	420	450	200	460	219	470	461	3,605	410	418	180	450	460	221	640	400	464	3,643	7,248
Par	4	5	4	4	3	4	3	4	4	35	4	4	3	4	4	3	5	4	4	35	70

== Early years ==
The first four editions were at Canterbury Golf Club near Cleveland; the inaugural in 1983 had fifty players, no cut, and a purse of $250,000; Miller Barber won the title and $40,000, sinking a ten-foot (3 m) birdie putt on the final hole to finish one stroke ahead of runner-up Gene Littler. Arnold Palmer was seven strokes back, in a tie for fifth.

Palmer won the next year by three strokes, and successfully defended the title in 1985, winning by eleven strokes. Heavy rains on Thursday afternoon reduced the tournament to 54 holes in 1986, and Chi-Chi Rodríguez gained the first of his 22 wins on the senior tour, two strokes ahead of Bruce Crampton.

== Winners ==
Year	Winner	Score	To par	Margin of victory	Runner(s)-up	Winner's share ($)	Venue	Location
Kaulig Companies Championship
2026	(United States) Zach Johnson	265	−15	6 strokes	(United States) Boo Weekley	525,000	Firestone (South Course)	Akron, Ohio
2025	(Spain) Miguel Ángel Jiménez	270	−10	Playoff	(New Zealand) Steven Alker	525,000	Firestone (South Course)	Akron, Ohio
2024	(South Africa) Ernie Els	270	−10	1 stroke	(South Korea) Yang Yong-eun	525,000	Firestone (South Course)	Akron, Ohio
2023	(United States) Steve Stricker (2)	269	−11	3 strokes	(United States) David Toms	525,000	Firestone (South Course)	Akron, Ohio
Bridgestone Senior Players Championship
2022	(United States) Jerry Kelly (2)	269	−11	2 strokes	(United States) Steve Stricker	450,000	Firestone (South Course)	Akron, Ohio
2021	(United States) Steve Stricker	273	−7	6 strokes	(United States) Jerry Kelly	420,000	Firestone (South Course)	Akron, Ohio
2020	(United States) Jerry Kelly	277	−3	2 strokes	(United States) Scott Parel	420,000	Firestone (South Course)	Akron, Ohio
2019	(South Africa) Retief Goosen	274	−6	2 strokes	(United States) Jay Haas (United States) Tim Petrovic	420,000	Firestone (South Course)	Akron, Ohio
Constellation Senior Players Championship
2018	(Fiji) Vijay Singh	268	−20	Playoff	(United States) Jeff Maggert	420,000	Exmoor	Highland Park, Illinois
2017	(United States) Scott McCarron	270	−18	1 stroke	(United States) Brandt Jobe (Germany) Bernhard Langer	420,000	Caves Valley	Owings Mills, Maryland
2016	(Germany) Bernhard Langer (3)	281	+1	1 stroke	(United States) Joe Durant (Spain) Miguel Ángel Jiménez	420,000	Philadelphia (Wissahickon Course)	Flourtown, Pennsylvania
2015	(Germany) Bernhard Langer (2)	265	−19	5 strokes	(United States) Kirk Triplett	405,000	Belmont	Belmont, Massachusetts
2014	(Germany) Bernhard Langer	265	−15	Playoff	(United States) Jeff Sluman	405,000	Fox Chapel	Pittsburgh, Pennsylvania
2013	(United States) Kenny Perry	261	−19	5 strokes	(United States) Fred Funk	405,000	Fox Chapel	Pittsburgh, Pennsylvania
2012	(United States) Joe Daley	266	−14	2 strokes	(United States) Tom Lehman	405,000	Fox Chapel	Pittsburgh, Pennsylvania
Constellation Energy Senior Players Championship
2011	(United States) Fred Couples	273	−11	Playoff	(United States) John Cook	405,000	Westchester	Harrison, New York
2010	(United States) Mark O'Meara	273	−7	Playoff	(United States) Michael Allen	405,000	TPC Potomac	Potomac, Maryland
2009	(United States) Jay Haas	267	−13	1 stroke	(United States) Tom Watson	405,000	Baltimore (East Course)	Timonium, Maryland
2008	(United States) D. A. Weibring	271	−9	1 stroke	(United States) Fred Funk	390,000	Baltimore (East Course)	Timonium, Maryland
2007	(United States) Loren Roberts	267	−13	6 strokes	(United States) Tom Watson	390,000	Baltimore (East Course)	Timonium, Maryland
Ford Senior Players Championship
2006	(United States) Bobby Wadkins	274	−14	1 stroke	(United States) Jim Thorpe	375,000	TPC of Michigan	Dearborn, Michigan
2005	(United States) Peter Jacobsen	273	−15	1 stroke	(United States) Hale Irwin	375,000	TPC of Michigan	Dearborn, Michigan
2004	(England) Mark James	275	−13	1 stroke	(Spain) José María Cañizares	375,000	TPC of Michigan	Dearborn, Michigan
2003	(United States) Craig Stadler	271	−17	3 strokes	(United States) Tom Kite (United States) Jim Thorpe (United States) Tom Watson	375,000	TPC of Michigan	Dearborn, Michigan
2002	(Australia) Stewart Ginn	274	−14	1 stroke	(United States) Hubert Green (United States) Mike McCullough (United States) Jim Thorpe	375,000	TPC of Michigan	Dearborn, Michigan
2001	(United States) Allen Doyle	273	−15	Playoff	(United States) Doug Tewell	375,000	TPC of Michigan	Dearborn, Michigan
2000	(United States) Raymond Floyd (2)	273	−15	1 stroke	(United States) Larry Nelson (United States) Dana Quigley	345,000	TPC of Michigan	Dearborn, Michigan
1999	(United States) Hale Irwin	267	−21	7 strokes	(Australia) Graham Marsh	300,000	TPC of Michigan	Dearborn, Michigan
1998	(United States) Gil Morgan	267	−21	3 strokes	(United States) Hale Irwin	300,000	TPC of Michigan	Dearborn, Michigan
1997	(United States) Larry Gilbert	274	−14	3 strokes	(Japan) Isao Aoki (United States) Bob Dickson (United States) Jack Kiefer (United States) Dave Stockton	270,000	TPC of Michigan	Dearborn, Michigan
1996	(United States) Raymond Floyd	275	−13	2 strokes	(United States) Hale Irwin	225,000	TPC of Michigan	Dearborn, Michigan
1995	(United States) J. C. Snead	272	−16	Playoff	(United States) Jack Nicklaus	225,000	TPC of Michigan	Dearborn, Michigan
1994	(United States) Dave Stockton (2)	271	−17	6 strokes	(United States) Jim Albus	210,000	TPC of Michigan	Dearborn, Michigan
1993	(United States) Jim Colbert	278	−10	1 stroke	(United States) Raymond Floyd	180,000	TPC of Michigan	Dearborn, Michigan
The Senior Players Championship
1992	(United States) Dave Stockton	277	−11	1 stroke	(United States) J. C. Snead (United States) Lee Trevino	150,000	TPC of Michigan	Dearborn, Michigan
1991	(United States) Jim Albus	279	−9	3 strokes	(New Zealand) Bob Charles (United States) Charles Coody (United States) Dave Hill	150,000	TPC of Michigan	Dearborn, Michigan
Mazda Senior Tournament Players Championship
1990	(United States) Jack Nicklaus	261	−27	6 strokes	(United States) Lee Trevino	150,000	Dearborn	Dearborn, Michigan
1989	(United States) Orville Moody	271	−17	2 strokes	(United States) Charles Coody	105,000	TPC at Sawgrass	Ponte Vedra Beach, Florida
1988	(United States) Billy Casper	278	−10	2 strokes	(United States) Al Geiberger	60,000	TPC at Sawgrass	Ponte Vedra Beach, Florida
1987	(South Africa) Gary Player	280	−8	1 stroke	(Australia) Bruce Crampton (United States) Chi-Chi Rodríguez	60,000	Sawgrass	Ponte Vedra Beach, Florida
Senior Tournament Players Championship
1986	(United States) Chi-Chi Rodríguez	206 (Note: Shortened to 54 holes due to rain.)	−10	2 strokes	(Australia) Bruce Crampton	45,000	Canterbury	Beachwood, Ohio
1985	(United States) Arnold Palmer (2)	274	−14	11 strokes	(United States) Miller Barber (United States) Lee Elder (United States) Gene Littler (United States) Charles Owens	36,000	Canterbury	Beachwood, Ohio
1984	(United States) Arnold Palmer	276	−12	3 strokes	(Australia) Peter Thomson	36,000	Canterbury	Beachwood, Ohio
1983	(United States) Miller Barber	278	−10	1 stroke	(United States) Gene Littler	40,000	Canterbury	Beachwood, Ohio

== Multiple winners ==
Through 2023, six players had multiple wins in the Senior Players Championship:

- 3 wins: Bernhard Langer (2014, 2015, 2016)
- 2 wins: Arnold Palmer (1984, 1985), Dave Stockton (1992, 1994), Raymond Floyd (1996, 2000), Jerry Kelly (2020, 2022), Steve Stricker (2021, 2023)

== Winners of both The Players and the Senior Players ==
Three have won both The Players Championship and the Senior Players Championship:

Player	The Players Championship	Senior Players Championship
Jack Nicklaus	1974, 1976, 1978	1990
Raymond Floyd	1981	1996, 2000
Fred Couples	1984, 1996	2011
