= Lee Janzen =

American professional golfer (born 1964)

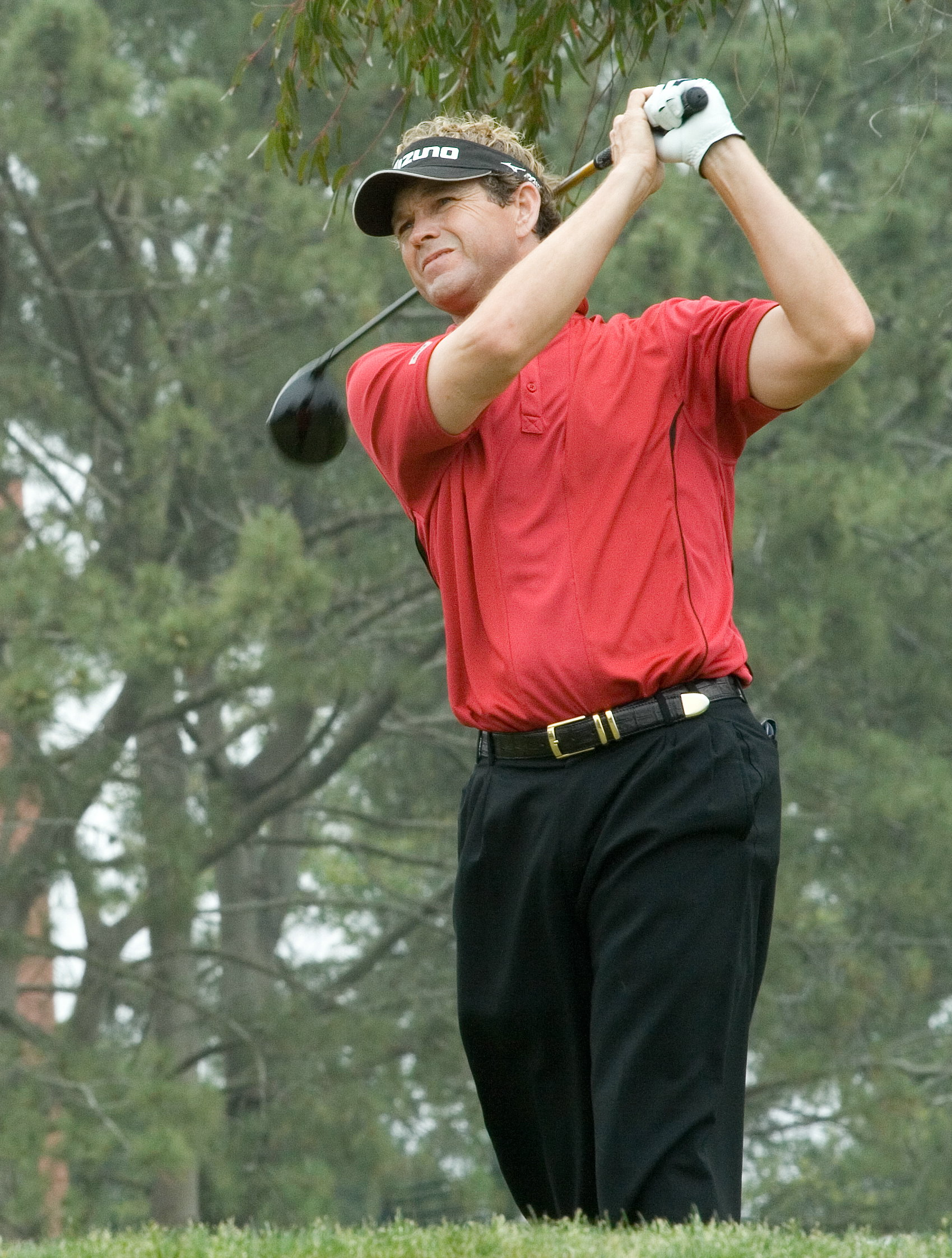
- Janzen in 2008

Personal information
- Full name: Lee MacLeod Janzen
- Nationality: United States
- Born: August 28, 1964 (age 62) Austin, Minnesota, U.S.
- Height: 6 ft 0 in (1.83 m)
- Weight: 175 lb (79 kg; 12.5 st)

Career
- Sport: Golf
- College: Florida Southern College
- Turned professional: 1986
- Current tour: PGA Tour Champions
- Former tours: PGA Tour; U.S. Golf Tour
- Professional wins: 16
- Highest ranking: 13 (November 26, 1995)

Number of wins by tour
- PGA Tour: 8
- European Tour: 2
- PGA Tour Champions: 2
- Other: 6

Best results in major championships (wins: 2)
- Masters Tournament: T12: 1995, 1996
- PGA Championship: 4th: 1997
- U.S. Open: Won: 1993, 1998
- The Open Championship: T24: 1995, 1998

Lee McLeod Janzen (born August 28, 1964) is an American professional golfer who is best known for winning the U.S. Open twice in 1993 and 1998. He currently plays on the PGA Tour Champions, and was an eight-time winner on the PGA Tour.

== Early life and amateur career ==
Janzen was born in Austin, Minnesota, and spent most of his childhood in Baltimore, Maryland, where he played Little League baseball. When Janzen was 12, his father's company transferred him to Florida and his parents started him in golf and tennis, and he continued playing baseball. Janzen liked golf best and started playing that sport exclusively. He won his first tournament at age 15 as a member of the Greater Tampa Junior Golf Association.

Janzen chose to attend a small college – Florida Southern. In 1985 and 1986, Florida Southern won the NCAA Division II national team championship. Janzen was the individual champion in 1986.

== Professional career ==
In 1986, Janzen turned professional later that same year. In 1989, Janzen joined the PGA Tour. He has won eight times on the PGA Tour, most notably the 1993 and 1998 U.S. Opens. In 1993, Janzen defeated Payne Stewart at Baltusrol in Springfield, New Jersey, en route to tying the 72-hole U.S. Open scoring record of 8-under-par. Five years later, he again beat out Stewart to win his second U.S. Open, this time at the Olympic Club in San Francisco. He overcame a five stroke deficit on Sunday, marking the best final-round comeback in a U.S. Open for 25 years since Johnny Miller's win in 1973.

Janzen also notched a victory at The Players Championship in 1995. The Players is a premiere event on the PGA Tour and includes the largest purse of the season. He has been featured in the top 20 of the Official World Golf Ranking.

Janzen had several opportunities to win additional major golf championships. In 1996, he was in contention at both the U.S. Open and PGA Championship before finishing in the top-10 in both events. He finished fourth at the 1997 PGA Championship after sharing the 36-hole lead at Winged Foot in Mamaroneck, New York.

Janzen also played on two American Ryder Cup teams, in 1993 and 1997.

== Personal life ==
Janzen has lived in various places in Central Florida since becoming a professional golfer. He is a Republican.

== Professional wins (16) ==
=== PGA Tour wins (8) ===
Legend
Major championships (2)
Players Championships (1)
Other PGA Tour (5)

| No. | Date | Tournament | Winning score | To par | Margin of victory | Runner-up |
|---|---|---|---|---|---|---|
| 1 | Feb 16, 1992 | Northern Telecom Open | 71-67-67-65=270 | −18 | 1 stroke | (United States) Bill Britton |
| 2 | Jan 31, 1993 | Phoenix Open | 67-65-73-68=273 | −11 | 2 strokes | (United States) Andrew Magee |
| 3 | Jun 20, 1993 | U.S. Open | 67-67-69-69=272 | −8 | 2 strokes | (United States) Payne Stewart |
| 4 | Jun 12, 1994 | Buick Classic | 69-69-64-66=268 | −16 | 3 strokes | (South Africa) Ernie Els |
| 5 | Mar 26, 1995 | The Players Championship | 69-74-69-71=283 | −5 | 1 stroke | (Germany) Bernhard Langer |
| 6 | Jun 11, 1995 | Kemper Open | 68-69-68-67=272 | −12 | Playoff | (United States) Corey Pavin |
| 7 | Aug 20, 1995 | Sprint International | 34 pts (10-9-6-9=34) | | 1 point | (South Africa) Ernie Els |
| 8 | Jun 21, 1998 | U.S. Open (2) | 73-66-73-68=280 | E | 1 stroke | (United States) Payne Stewart |

PGA Tour playoff record (1–0)

| No. | Year | Tournament | Opponent | Result |
|---|---|---|---|---|
| 1 | 1995 | Kemper Open | (United States) Corey Pavin | Won with birdie on first extra hole |

=== U.S. Golf Tour wins (2) ===
| No. | Date | Tournament | Winning score | To par | Margin of victory | Runner-up |
|---|---|---|---|---|---|---|
| 1 | May 7, 1989 | Reserve Invitational | 68-73-65-70=276 | −12 | 1 stroke | (United States) Steve Lowery |
| 2 | Jun 11, 1989 | Pepsi Open | 67-70-66-69=272 | −16 | 4 strokes | (United States) Marco Dawson |

=== Space Coast Tour wins (2) ===
- 1988 Wedgewood tournament
- 1989 Poinciana tournament

=== Other wins (2) ===
| No. | Date | Tournament | Winning score | To par | Margin of victory | Runner(s)-up |
|---|---|---|---|---|---|---|
| 1 | Jul 27, 1999 | Tylenol Par-3 Shootout | $260,000 | | $30,000 | (United States) Phil Mickelson |
| 2 | Nov 24, 2002 | Franklin Templeton Shootout (with (United States) Rocco Mediate) | 65-60-60=185 | −31 | 1 stroke | (United States) David Gossett and (United States) Matt Kuchar, (United States) John Huston and (United States) Jeff Maggert |

Other playoff record (0–1)

| No. | Year | Tournament | Opponent | Result |
|---|---|---|---|---|
| 1 | 2014 | Callaway Pebble Beach Invitational | (United States) Tommy Armour III | Lost to birdie on first extra hole |

=== PGA Tour Champions wins (2) ===
| No. | Date | Tournament | Winning score | Margin of victory | Runner-up |
|---|---|---|---|---|---|
| 1 | Feb 15, 2015 | ACE Group Classic | −16 (68-65-67=200) | Playoff | (United States) Bart Bryant |
| 2 | Oct 17, 2021 | SAS Championship | −12 (67-70-67=204) | Playoff | (Spain) Miguel Ángel Jiménez |

PGA Tour Champions playoff record (2–0)

| No. | Year | Tournament | Opponent | Result |
|---|---|---|---|---|
| 1 | 2015 | ACE Group Classic | (United States) Bart Bryant | Won with par on first extra hole |
| 2 | 2021 | SAS Championship | (Spain) Miguel Ángel Jiménez | Won with birdie on first extra hole |

== Major championships ==
=== Wins (2) ===
| Year | Championship | 54 holes | Winning score | Margin | Runner-up |
|---|---|---|---|---|---|
| 1993 | U.S. Open | 1 shot lead | −8 (67-67-69-69=272) | 2 strokes | (United States) Payne Stewart |
| 1998 | U.S. Open (2) | 5 shot deficit | E (73-66-73-68=280) | 1 stroke | (United States) Payne Stewart |

=== Results timeline ===
| Tournament | 1985 | 1986 | 1987 | 1988 | 1989 |
|---|---|---|---|---|---|
| Masters Tournament | | | | | |
| U.S. Open | CUT | | | | |
| The Open Championship | | | | | |
| PGA Championship | | | | | |

| Tournament | 1990 | 1991 | 1992 | 1993 | 1994 | 1995 | 1996 | 1997 | 1998 | 1999 |
|---|---|---|---|---|---|---|---|---|---|---|
| Masters Tournament | | | T54 | T39 | T30 | T12 | T12 | T26 | T33 | T14 |
| U.S. Open | | CUT | CUT | 1 | CUT | T13 | T10 | T52 | 1 | T46 |
| The Open Championship | | | T39 | T48 | T35 | T24 | CUT | CUT | T24 | 70 |
| PGA Championship | | | T21 | T22 | T66 | T23 | T8 | 4 | CUT | CUT |

| Tournament | 2000 | 2001 | 2002 | 2003 | 2004 | 2005 | 2006 | 2007 | 2008 | 2009 |
|---|---|---|---|---|---|---|---|---|---|---|
| Masters Tournament | CUT | T31 | CUT | CUT | | | | | | |
| U.S. Open | T37 | CUT | CUT | T55 | T24 | T57 | CUT | T13 | CUT | |
| The Open Championship | CUT | | T80 | CUT | | | | | | |
| PGA Championship | T19 | CUT | T53 | T34 | | CUT | | | | |

| Tournament | 2010 | 2011 | 2012 | 2013 | 2014 | 2015 |
|---|---|---|---|---|---|---|
| Masters Tournament | | | | | | |
| U.S. Open | | | | | | CUT |
| The Open Championship | | | | | | |
| PGA Championship | | | | | | |

Win
Top 10
Did not play

CUT = missed the half way cut
"T" indicates a tie for a place.

=== Summary ===
| Tournament | Wins | 2nd | 3rd | Top-5 | Top-10 | Top-25 | Events | Cuts made |
|---|---|---|---|---|---|---|---|---|
| Masters Tournament | 0 | 0 | 0 | 0 | 0 | 3 | 12 | 9 |
| U.S. Open | 2 | 0 | 0 | 2 | 3 | 6 | 20 | 11 |
| The Open Championship | 0 | 0 | 0 | 0 | 0 | 4 | 11 | 7 |
| PGA Championship | 0 | 0 | 0 | 1 | 2 | 6 | 13 | 9 |
| Totals | 2 | 0 | 0 | 3 | 5 | 19 | 56 | 36 |

- Most consecutive cuts made – 8 (1994 Open Championship – 1996 U.S. Open)
- Longest streak of top-10s – 1 (five times)

== The Players Championship ==
=== Wins (1) ===
| Year | Championship | 54 holes | Winning score | Margin | Runner-up |
|---|---|---|---|---|---|
| 1995 | The Players Championship | 1 shot deficit | −5 (69-74-69-71=283) | 1 stroke | (Germany) Bernhard Langer |

=== Results timeline ===
| Tournament | 1991 | 1992 | 1993 | 1994 | 1995 | 1996 | 1997 | 1998 | 1999 | 2000 | 2001 | 2002 | 2003 | 2004 | 2005 | 2006 | 2007 | 2008 | 2009 | 2010 |
|---|---|---|---|---|---|---|---|---|---|---|---|---|---|---|---|---|---|---|---|---|
| The Players Championship | CUT | CUT | T34 | T35 | 1 | T46 | T37 | T13 | CUT | T9 | T18 | CUT | 68 | CUT | T68 | | | | | CUT |

Win
Top 10
Did not play

CUT = missed the halfway cut
"T" indicates a tie for a place.

== Results in World Golf Championships ==
| Tournament | 1999 | 2000 | 2001 | 2002 |
|---|---|---|---|---|
| Match Play | R32 | R64 | | R64 |
| Championship | | | NT^{1} | |
| Invitational | T30 | | | |

^{1}Cancelled due to 9/11

Did not play

QF, R16, R32, R64 = Round in which player lost in match play
"T" = Tied
NT = No tournament

== U. S. national team appearances ==
- Ryder Cup: 1993 (winners), 1997
- Dunhill Cup: 1995
- Presidents Cup: 1998
- Wendy's 3-Tour Challenge (representing PGA Tour): 1993, 1995, 1999

== See also ==
- 1989 PGA Tour Qualifying School graduates
