= Pacific Links Bear Mountain Championship =

Coordinates: 48.2801°N 123.3135°W

Tournament information
- Location: Victoria, British Columbia, Canada
- Established: 2012
- Course: Bear Mountain Resort
- Tour: PGA Tour Champions
- Format: Stroke play - 54 holes (no cut)
- Prize fund: $2.5 million
- Month played: September
- Final year: 2017

Tournament record score
- Aggregate: 197 Paul Goydos (2014)
- To par: −19 Paul Goydos (2014)

Final champion
- (United States) Jerry Kelly

Location in Canada

The Pacific Links Bear Mountain Championship was a professional golf tournament on the PGA Tour Champions. It was first played in September 2012 at the Kapolei Golf Course in Kapolei, Hawaii, which is owned and operated by Pacific Links International. It moved to the 27 Club in Tianjin, China for the 2015 season but was eventually canceled. It moved to Victoria, British Columbia, Canada for the 2016 season

The purse for the 2016 tournament was $2.5 million, with a winner's share of $375,000.

== Winners ==
Year	Dates	Champion	Country	Winning score	Margin	Purse ($)
Pacific Links Bear Mountain Championship
2017	Sep 15–17	Jerry Kelly	United States	199 (−14)	1 stroke	2,500,000
2016	Sep 23–25	Colin Montgomerie	Scotland	198 (−15)	Playoff	2,500,000
Pacific Links China Championship
2015	Sep 18–20	No tournament because of Tianjin explosions				
Pacific Links Hawai'i Championship
2014	Sep 19–21	Paul Goydos	United States	197 (−19)	1 stroke	2,200,000
2013	Sep 20–22	Mark Wiebe	United States	205 (−11)	Playoff	1,800,000
2012	Sep 14–16	Willie Wood	United States	202 (−14)	1 stroke	1,800,000
