= Dearborn Country Club =

- U.S. National Register of Historic Places
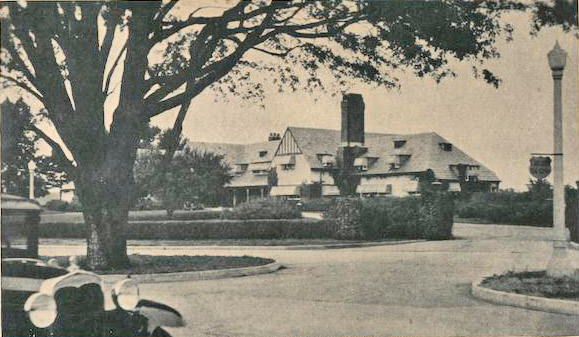
- Dearborn Country Club, c. 1930
- Interactive map
- Location: 800 North Military St. Dearborn, Michigan
- Coordinates: 42°22′18″N 83°28′11″W
- Built: 1923
- Architect: Albert Kahn
- Architectural style: Tudor Revival
- NRHP reference No.: 100011221
- Added to NRHP: March 10, 2025

The Dearborn Country Club is a golf club located at 800 North Military Street in Dearborn, Michigan. It was listed on the National Register of Historic Places in 2025.

== History ==
Between 1909 and 1916, Henry Ford purchased a number of tracts of farmland from landowners near Dearborn. In 1915, Ford moved into his estate at Fair Lane, and invested large sums of money into the community, including opening the Ford Engineering Building in 1923. The investment attracted many upper middle class residents, including Ford Motor Company employees, to Dearborn. Some of these approached Henry Ford about establishing a country club near the city. In 1923, Ford tasked his personal secretary Ernest Liebold with establishing what would become the Dearborn Country Club.

In 1923, Liebold commissioned a local landscape architect to lay out the golf course; however, when the plan was nearing completion, Ford suddenly hired professional golf course architect Donald Ross instead. Liebold also commissioned Albert Kahn to design a clubhouse, with substantial input from both Henry and Clara Ford. Construction on the clubhouse began in 1924, and was completed in 1925. The Dearborn Country Club was incorporated on March 25, 1925, with membership open to people living in the area. The first meal served in the clubhouse was on September 29, 1925.

The club became a center of Dearborn's high society throughout the 1920s and 1930s. The Fords retained control of the club until 1944, when ownership was transferred to Seaboard Properties Company, a Ford-owned corporate subsidiary. In 1952, club members purchased the property. A pool house was added in 1956, and multiple additions to the clubhouse were made in 1959 and 1960. The golf course was modernized in 1966/67 by designer Clinton E. "Robbie" Robinson.

== Description ==
The Dearborn Country Club consists of an eighteen-hole golf course and associated buildings, including the clubhouse, caddie house and pro shop, pool house, and associated maintenance buildings. The clubhouse is a two-story, Tudor Revival building constructed of reinforced concrete. The main section is a symmetric I-plan building with two steeply pitched front-facing gable roofs. The roofs are connected by a broad, low-pitch combination roof. A one-and-one-half-story, rectangular-plan wing with hipped roof extends south from the primary section. A hipped roof L-plan later addition extends north from the primary section, and two single-story, rectangular-plan sections with a Mansard roofs extend northeast and southeast from the building.
