= Japan Championship (golf) =

Coordinates: 35.46°N 140.19°E

Mastercard Japan Championship

Tournament information
- Location: Narita, Chiba, Japan
- Established: 2017
- Course: Narita Golf Club
- Tour: PGA Tour Champions
- Format: Stroke play - 54 holes (no cut)
- Prize fund: $2,500,000
- Month played: June

Tournament record score
- Aggregate: 202 Colin Montgomerie (2017)
- To par: −14 as above

Current champion
- (United States) Scott McCarron

Location in Japan

The Mastercard Japan Championship is a professional golf tournament in Japan on the PGA Tour Champions, played at Narita Golf Club in Narita, Chiba, Japan. The inaugural edition in September 2017 featured an 81-player field competing for a $2.5 million purse, and was a no-cut, 54-hole event.

Colin Montgomerie won the inaugural event by one stroke over Billy Mayfair and Scott McCarron.

== Winners ==
Year	Dates	Champion	Country	Winning score	To par	Margin of victory	Purse ($)
2020	No tournament						
Mastercard Japan Championship
2019	7–9 Jun	Scott McCarron	United States	203	−13	3 strokes	2,500,000
Japan Airlines Championship
2018	No tournament						
2017	8–10 Sep	Colin Montgomerie	Scotland	202	−14	1 stroke	2,500,000
