= Kirk Triplett =

American professional golfer (born 1962)

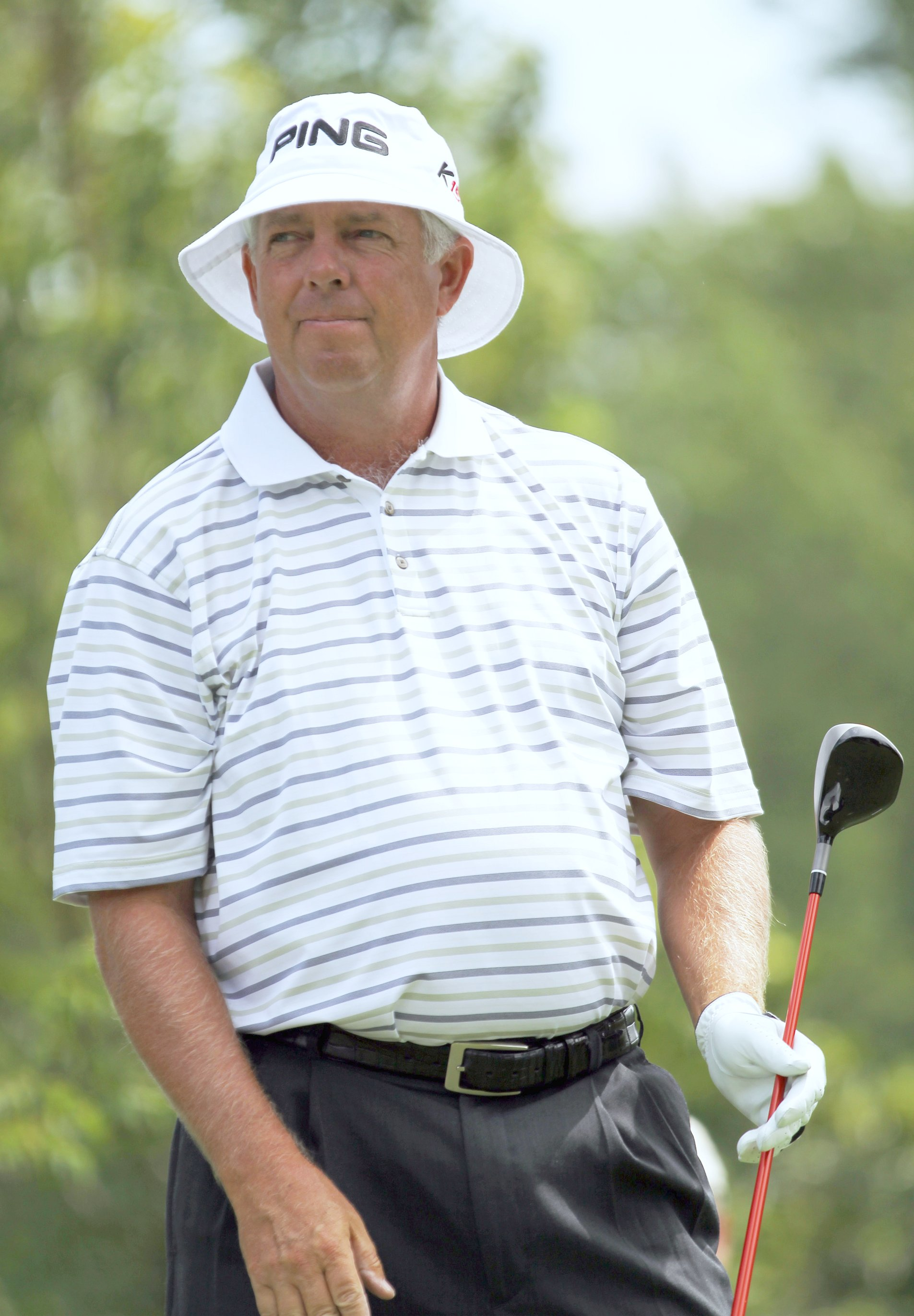
- Triplett in 2011

Personal information
- Full name: Kirk Alan Triplett
- Nationality: United States
- Born: March 29, 1962 (age 64) Moses Lake, Washington, U.S.
- Height: 6 ft 3 in (1.91 m)
- Weight: 200 lb (91 kg; 14 st)
- Spouse: Cathi
- Children: 4

Career
- Sport: Golf
- College: Nevada
- Turned professional: 1985
- Current tour: PGA Tour Champions
- Former tours: PGA Tour; Nationwide Tour
- Professional wins: 17
- Highest ranking: 25 (June 4, 2000)

Number of wins by tour
- PGA Tour: 3
- Korn Ferry Tour: 1
- PGA Tour Champions: 8
- Other: 5

Best results in major championships
- Masters Tournament: T6: 2001, 2004
- PGA Championship: T10: 2001
- U.S. Open: T7: 2001
- The Open Championship: T60: 2000

Achievements and awards
- Champions Tour Rookie of the Year: 2012

Kirk Alan Triplett (born March 29, 1962) is an American professional golfer who has played on the PGA Tour, Nationwide Tour, and PGA Tour Champions.

== Early life and amateur career ==
Born in Moses Lake, Washington, Triplett grew up on the Palouse in Pullman and graduated from Pullman High School in 1980. He accepted a golf scholarship to the University of Nevada in Reno, and earned a degree in civil engineering.

== Professional career ==
Triplett became a golf professional in 1985 and played on tours in Australia, Asia, and Canada. He qualified for the U.S. Open in 1986 and 1987, but missed the cuts.

In his fourth attempt, Triplett earned his PGA Tour card in December 1989 at the qualifying tournament near Houston, and was a rookie in 1990. He won three events during his career: the Nissan Open in 2000, the Reno-Tahoe Open in 2003, and the Chrysler Classic of Tucson in 2006. He was also a runner-up five times: Houston Open (1992), Buick Invitational (1995), John Deere Classic (2000), Michelob Championship at Kingsmill (2001), and Bay Hill Invitational (2003).

A member of the Presidents Cup team in 2000, Triplett claimed three wins and halved in singles as the U.S. won 21½–10½. His career best Official World Golf Ranking was 25th in June 2000.

Triplett's best result in a major championship was a tie for sixth at the Masters, in 2001 and 2004. The latter included a hole in one, late in the fourth round at the par-3 16th (Redbud); in the preceding pairing ten minutes earlier, Pádraig Harrington had also aced it.

In 2009, Triplett finished outside the top 150 on the money list and lost his PGA Tour playing card. On the Nationwide Tour in 2011, he won the News Sentinel Open at age 49 to become that tour's oldest winner ever.

=== Senior career ===
Eligible to play on the Champions Tour in 2012 after March 29, Triplett won in his eighth attempt on July 9, at the Nature Valley First Tee Open at Pebble Beach. He entered the final round four strokes behind, but shot a final round 66 to surge through the pack and prevail by two strokes over Mark McNulty. The win made him the sixth player to win on all the PGA Tour sponsored tours (PGA Tour, Web.com Tour, and Champions Tour). He successfully defended the title in 2013 for his second Champions Tour win.

Triplett shot a tournament record 9-under-par at the Principal Charity Classic at West Glen Oaks Country Club in Des Moines, Iowa. Through December 2018, he has six wins on the PGA Tour Champions.

Triplett is also part owner of a hole in one insurance company called Hole In One International in conjunction with President/CEO Mark Gilmartin.

In March 2019, Triplett won the Hoag Classic in Newport Beach, California in a playoff over Woody Austin. Playing the par-5 18th hole at Newport Beach Country Club for the third time on the final day of the tournament, Triplett holed an 18-foot eagle putt for his seventh PGA Tour Champions victory.

In September 2019, Triplett won the PURE Insurance Championship at Pebble Beach Golf Links in a playoff over Billy Andrade.

== Professional wins (17) ==
=== PGA Tour wins (3) ===
No.	Date	Tournament	Winning score	To par	Margin of victory	Runner-up
1	Feb 20, 2000	Nissan Open	67-70-68-67=272	−12	1 stroke	(Sweden) Jesper Parnevik
2	Aug 24, 2003	Reno–Tahoe Open	67-68-73-63=271	−17	3 strokes	(United States) Tim Herron
3	Feb 26, 2006	Chrysler Classic of Tucson	68-71-64-63=266	−22	1 stroke	(United States) Jerry Kelly

PGA Tour playoff record (0–1)

No.	Year	Tournament	Opponent	Result
1	2000	John Deere Classic	(United States) Michael Clark II	Lost to birdie on fourth extra hole

=== Nationwide Tour wins (1) ===
No.	Date	Tournament	Winning score	To par	Margin of victory	Runner-up
1	Aug 28, 2011	News Sentinel Open	67-64-68-68=267	−21	2 strokes	(United States) Marco Dawson

=== Canadian Tour wins (2) ===
No.	Date	Tournament	Winning score	To par	Margin of victory	Runner-up
1	Jun 26, 1988	Alberta Open	66-68-64-71=279	−1	Playoff	(United States) Vic Wilk
2	Jul 1, 1988	Fort McMurray Rotary Charity Classic	65-69-70=204	−12	3 strokes	(South Africa) Wayne Bradley

=== Other wins (3) ===
- 1988 Sierra Nevada Open
- 1991 California State Open
- 1996 Merrill Lynch Pebble Beach Invitational

=== PGA Tour Champions wins (8) ===
No.	Date	Tournament	Winning score	To par	Margin of victory	Runner(s)-up
1	Jul 8, 2012	Nature Valley First Tee Open at Pebble Beach	70-70-66=206	−10	2 strokes	(Republic of Ireland) Mark McNulty
2	Sep 29, 2013	Nature Valley First Tee Open at Pebble Beach (2)	67-70-68=205	−11	2 strokes	(United States) Dan Forsman, (United States) Doug Garwood
3	Feb 16, 2014	ACE Group Classic	67-67-66=200	−16	1 stroke	(United States) Olin Browne, (Germany) Bernhard Langer, (United States) Duffy Waldorf
4	Oct 12, 2014	SAS Championship	70-63-69=202	−14	3 strokes	(United States) Tom Lehman
5	Jun 26, 2016	American Family Insurance Championship	68-66-65=199	−17	2 strokes	(United States) Bart Bryant, (United States) Mike Goodes
6	Apr 22, 2018	Bass Pro Shops Legends of Golf (with (England) Paul Broadhurst)	65-48-33-48=194	−24	Playoff	(Germany) Bernhard Langer and (United States) Tom Lehman
7	Mar 10, 2019	Hoag Classic	70-65-68=203	−10	Playoff	(United States) Woody Austin
8	Sep 29, 2019	PURE Insurance Championship (3)	70-69-67=206	−9	Playoff	(United States) Billy Andrade

PGA Tour Champions playoff record (3–1)

No.	Year	Tournament	Opponent(s)	Result
1	2018	Bass Pro Shops Legends of Golf (with (England) Paul Broadhurst)	(Germany) Bernhard Langer and (United States) Tom Lehman	Won with birdie on first extra hole
2	2019	Hoag Classic	(United States) Woody Austin	Won with eagle on second extra hole
3	2019	PURE Insurance Championship	(United States) Billy Andrade	Won with birdie on first extra hole
4	2022	Principal Charity Classic	(United States) Jerry Kelly	Lost to birdie on first extra hole

== Results in major championships ==
Tournament	1986	1987	1988	1989
Masters Tournament				
U.S. Open	CUT	CUT		
The Open Championship				
PGA Championship				

Tournament	1990	1991	1992	1993	1994	1995	1996	1997	1998	1999
Masters Tournament							CUT			
U.S. Open	T33	CUT	66	T52	T23		T40		CUT	CUT
The Open Championship					CUT					
PGA Championship	CUT		CUT		T15	T13	CUT	T13	CUT	T49

Tournament	2000	2001	2002	2003	2004	2005	2006	2007	2008	2009
Masters Tournament	CUT	T6	T40	CUT	T6	T17				
U.S. Open	56	T7	CUT	T28	T20			CUT		
The Open Championship	T60									
PGA Championship	T69	T10	T29	WD	CUT		CUT			

Tournament	2010	2011
Masters Tournament		
U.S. Open		CUT
The Open Championship		
PGA Championship		

Top 10
Did not play

WD = withdrew
CUT = missed the half-way cut
"T" = tied

=== Summary ===
Tournament	Wins	2nd	3rd	Top-5	Top-10	Top-25	Events	Cuts made
Masters Tournament	0	0	0	0	2	3	7	4
U.S. Open	0	0	0	0	1	3	17	9
The Open Championship	0	0	0	0	0	0	2	1
PGA Championship	0	0	0	0	1	4	14	7
Totals	0	0	0	0	4	10	40	21

- Most consecutive cuts made – 7 (2000 U.S. Open – 2001 PGA)
- Longest streak of top-10s – 3 (2001 Masters – 2001 PGA)

== Results in The Players Championship ==
Tournament	1990	1991	1992	1993	1994	1995	1996	1997	1998	1999
The Players Championship	T36	T68	CUT	T39	T45	67	T19	T10	T35	T38

Tournament	2000	2001	2002	2003	2004	2005	2006	2007
The Players Championship	T42	T31	CUT	T8	CUT	T17	T63	T23

Top 10

CUT = missed the halfway cut
"T" indicates a tie for a place

== Results in World Golf Championships ==
Tournament	2000	2001	2002	2003	2004	2005
Match Play		R64	R32			R16
Championship	T14	NT^{1}		65		
Invitational	T33	DQ	T28		T69	

^{1}Cancelled due to 9/11

Top 10
Did not play

QF, R16, R32, R64 = Round in which player lost in match play
"T" = Tied
DQ = disqualified
NT = No tournament

== Results in senior major championships ==
Results not in chronological order.

Tournament	2012	2013	2014	2015	2016	2017	2018	2019	2020	2021	2022	2023	2024	2025	2026
Senior PGA Championship	T19	T6		T13	T7	T33	T64	T28	NT	T63	T55	CUT	T51	T35	CUT
The Tradition	T33	T10		T41	T3	75		T16	NT	T48	T21	T53	T39	T42	T24
U.S. Senior Open	T22	T9	8	T57	WD	2	T8	5	NT	WD	CUT	T60	T48	T58	55
Senior Players Championship	T6	T60	T22	2	T7	T9	T28	T65	61	T42	75	66		T63	T48
Senior British Open Championship	T15		T8	T25			T3		NT		T47		CUT		CUT

Top 10
Did not play

CUT = missed the halfway cut
WD = withdrew
"T" indicates a tie for a place
NT = no tournament due to COVID-19 pandemic

== U.S. national team appearances ==
Professional

- Presidents Cup: 2000 (winners)

== See also ==
- 1989 PGA Tour Qualifying School graduates
