= 2006 Players Championship =

Golf tournament

Tournament information
- Dates: March 23–26, 2006
- Location: Ponte Vedra Beach, Florida; 30.198°N 81.394°W
- Courses: TPC Sawgrass, Stadium Course
- Tour: PGA Tour

Statistics
- Par: 72
- Length: 7,098 yards (6,490 m)
- Field: 144 players, 74 after cut
- Cut: 144 (Even)
- Prize fund: $8.0 million
- Winner's share: $1.44 million

Champion
- (Canada) Stephen Ames
- 274 (−14)

Location map
- Location in the United States Location in Florida

The 2006 Players Championship was a golf tournament in Florida on the PGA Tour, held March 23–26 at TPC Sawgrass in Ponte Vedra Beach, southeast of Jacksonville. It was the 33rd Players Championship.

== Tournament summary ==
Stephen Ames shot a final round 67 and completed the biggest win of his career by a comfortable margin, six strokes ahead of runner-up Retief Goosen. Ames was the 54-hole leader by a stroke over Sergio García and Vijay Singh.

A month earlier at the WGC-Accenture Match Play Championship, Ames lasted only ten holes in the first round, falling to Tiger Woods 9&8.

Defending champion Fred Funk finished thirteen strokes back, in a tie for sixteenth place.

This was the final Players held in March until 2019; it moved to mid-May in 2007. The Players was moved back to March starting 2019 as the PGA Championship moves from August to May from 2019 onwards.

== Venue ==
This was the 25th Players Championship held at the TPC at Sawgrass Stadium Course; five yards were added this year and its length was 7,098 yards (6,490 m).

== Eligibility requirements ==
Winners of PGA Tour co-sponsored or approved tournaments, whose victories are considered official, since the previous year's Players Championship.

Phil Mickelson, Tiger Woods, Peter Lonard, Vijay Singh, Tim Petrovic, Ted Purdy, Justin Leonard, Bart Bryant, Sergio García, Michael Campbell, Pádraig Harrington, Jim Furyk, Sean O'Hair, Jason Bohn, Ben Crane, Retief Goosen, Vaughn Taylor, Brad Faxon, Olin Browne, Mark Calcavecchia, Jason Gore, Robert Gamez, K. J. Choi, Wes Short Jr., Lucas Glover, Carl Pettersson, Heath Slocum, Stuart Appleby, David Toms, Chad Campbell, J. B. Holmes, Arron Oberholser, Rory Sabbatini, Geoff Ogilvy, Kirk Triplett, Luke Donald, Rod Pampling

The top 125 finishers on the 2005 Official PGA Tour money list.

Fred Funk, Davis Love III, Adam Scott, Scott Verplank, Tim Clark, Billy Mayfair, Brandt Jobe, Tim Herron, Charles Howell III, Shigeki Maruyama, Joe Ogilvie, Fred Couples, Zach Johnson, José María Olazábal, John Daly, Stewart Cink, Tom Lehman, Ernie Els, Tom Pernice Jr., Bo Van Pelt, Darren Clarke, Jonathan Kaye, Justin Rose, Mike Weir, Greg Owen, Jerry Kelly, Mark Hensby, Ryan Palmer, Jeff Brehaut, Pat Perez, Robert Allenby, Woody Austin, Billy Andrade, Kevin Na, Jeff Sluman, Bob Tway, Joey Sindelar, Dudley Hart, Joe Durant, J. L. Lewis, Carlos Franco, Charles Warren, Aaron Baddeley, Harrison Frazar, Brett Quigley, Scott McCarron, Arjun Atwal, Stephen Ames, Bernhard Langer, Steve Lowery, Ian Poulter, J. J. Henry, Daniel Chopra, Tag Ridings, Bob Estes, Loren Roberts, Steve Flesch, Freddie Jacobson, John Senden, Brian Davis, John Rollins, James Driscoll, Kevin Sutherland, Dean Wilson, D. J. Trahan, Hank Kuehne, Stephen Leaney, Jeff Maggert, Robert Damron, Corey Pavin, Jesper Parnevik, Doug Barron, Jonathan Byrd, Craig Barlow, Rich Beem, Rocco Mediate, Brian Gay, Richard S. Johnson, Hidemichi Tanaka, Patrick Sheehan, Todd Fischer, John Huston, Ryuji Imada, Tommy Armour III, Kent Jones, Craig Parry, Nick Price

For the duration of their exemption, PGA Tour members who earned a Tournament Winner exemption prior to March 1, 2004.

Winners of the Players Championship, Masters, U.S. Open, British Open, and PGA Championship from the 1996 to 1997 and from 2001 to 2005. Beginning with 1998, winners will be eligible for five years.

Nick Faldo, Steve Jones, Mark Brooks, Craig Perks, Shaun Micheel, David Duval, Ben Curtis, Todd Hamilton

Winners of the NEC World Series in the last years 10 years (1996–1997).

Winners of the Tour Championship in the last three years (2003–2005).

Winners of the WGC-Accenture Match Play Championship in the last years (2004–2006).

Winners of the WGC-NEC Invitational and WGC-American Express Championship in the last three years (2003–2005).

Any player(s), not otherwise eligible, among the top 50 leaders from the Official World Golf Ranking through the Bay Hill Invitational.

Colin Montgomerie, David Howell, Henrik Stenson, Ángel Cabrera, Nick O'Hern, Paul McGinley, Thomas Bjørn, Lee Westwood, Miguel Ángel Jiménez, Shingo Katayama

Any player(s), not otherwise eligible, among the top 10 leaders from the 2006 Official PGA Tour Money List through the Bay Hill Invitational.

If necessary to complete a field of 144 players, PGA Tour members from the 2006 Official PGA Tour Money List below 10th position through the Bay Hill Invitational, in order of their positions on such list.

Camilo Villegas, Nathan Green

== Round summaries ==
=== First round ===
Thursday, March 23, 2006

Place	Player	Score	To par
T1	(United States) Jim Furyk	65	−7
T1	(United States) Davis Love III	65	−7
T3	(Australia) Robert Allenby	67	−5
T3	(Spain) Miguel Ángel Jiménez	67	−5
T3	(Germany) Bernhard Langer	67	−5
T6	(United States) Ben Crane	68	−4
T6	(United States) Arron Oberholser	68	−4
T6	(Spain) José María Olazábal	68	−4
T6	(United States) John Rollins	68	−4
T6	(Fiji) Vijay Singh	68	−4
T6	(United States) Bo Van Pelt	68	−4

=== Second round ===
Friday, March 24, 2006

Place	Player	Score	To par
1	(United States) Jim Furyk	65-71=136	−8
T2	(Canada) Stephen Ames	71-66=137	−7
T2	(Australia) Adam Scott	70-67=137	−7
T4	(South Korea) K. J. Choi	69-69=138	−6
T4	(Spain) Sergio García	70-68=138	−6
T4	(Fiji) Vijay Singh	68-70=138	−6
T7	(United States) Brad Faxon	70-69=139	−5
T7	(United States) Steve Flesch	69-70=139	−5
T7	(United States) Fred Funk	69-70=139	−5
T7	(United States) Arron Oberholser	68-71=139	−5
T7	(Spain) José María Olazábal	68-71=139	−5
T7	(England) Greg Owen	71-68=139	−5
T7	(United States) John Rollins	68-71=139	−5
T7	(United States) Bo Van Pelt	68-71=139	−5

=== Third round ===
Saturday, March 25, 2006

Place	Player	Score	To par
1	(Canada) Stephen Ames	71-66-70=207	−9
T2	(Spain) Sergio García	70-68-70=208	−8
T2	(Fiji) Vijay Singh	68-70-70=208	−8
T4	(Sweden) Henrik Stenson	69-71-70=210	−6
T4	(Canada) Mike Weir	71-71-68=210	−6
T6	(United States) Jim Furyk	65-71-75=211	−5
T6	(South Africa) Retief Goosen	69-71-71=211	−5
T6	(United States) Tom Pernice Jr.	70-70-71=211	−5
T6	(Sweden) Carl Pettersson	71-70-70=211	−5
T6	(United States) John Rollins	68-71-72=211	−5
T6	(United States) Bo Van Pelt	68-71-72=211	−5

=== Final round ===
Sunday, March 26, 2006

Champion
(c) = past champion

Place	Player	Score	To par	Money ($)
1	(Canada) Stephen Ames	71-66-70-67=274	−14	1,440,000
2	(South Africa) Retief Goosen	69-71-71-69=280	−8	864,000
T3	(United States) Jim Furyk	65-71-75-72=283	−5	384,000
T3	(United States) Pat Perez	71-72-69-71=283	−5	384,000
T3	(Sweden) Henrik Stenson	69-71-70-73=283	−5	384,000
T3	(Colombia) Camilo Villegas	74-70-68-71=283	−5	384,000
7	(Spain) José María Olazábal	68-71-74-71=284	−4	268,000
T8	(South Africa) Ernie Els	72-70-72-71=285	−3	208,000
T8	(Sweden) Carl Pettersson	71-70-70-74=285	−3	208,000
T8	(United States) John Rollins	68-71-72-74=285	−3	208,000
T8	(Fiji) Vijay Singh	68-70-70-77=285	−3	208,000
T8	(United States) Vaughn Taylor	73-71-68-73=285	−3	208,000
T8	(United States) Bo Van Pelt	68-71-72-74=285	−3	208,000

Leaderboard below the top 10
Place	Player	Score	To par	Money ($)
T14	(Spain) Sergio García	70-68-70-78=286	−2	148,000
T14	(United States) Phil Mickelson	70-73-69-74=286	−2	148,000
T16	(South Korea) K. J. Choi	69-69-77-72=287	−1	124,000
T16	(United States) Brad Faxon	70-69-79-69=287	−1	124,000
T16	(United States) Fred Funk (c)	70-69-74-74=287	−1	124,000
T16	(United States) Charles Warren	73-71-72-71=287	−1	124,000
T20	(Northern Ireland) Darren Clarke	73-70-72-73=288	E	100,000
T20	(England) Brian Davis	70-73-73-72=288	E	100,000
T22	(Sweden) Freddie Jacobson	69-72-74-74=289	+1	76,800
T22	(England) Greg Owen	71-68-77-73=289	+1	76,800
T22	(Australia) Craig Parry	70-73-70-76=289	+1	76,800
T22	(Canada) Mike Weir	71-71-68-79=289	+1	76,800
T22	(United States) Tiger Woods (c)	72-69-73-75=289	+1	76,800
T27	(United States) Jason Bohn	71-72-72-75=290	+2	53,250
T27	(United States) James Driscoll	71-72-70-77=290	+2	53,250
T27	(United States) Todd Fischer	73-68-72-77=290	+2	53,250
T27	(Sweden) Richard S. Johnson	72-70-75-73=290	+2	53,250
T27	(United States) Tom Lehman	71-71-70-78=290	+2	53,250
T27	(United States) Tom Pernice Jr.	70-70-71-79=290	+2	53,250
T27	(England) Ian Poulter	72-68-75-75=290	+2	53,250
T27	(Zimbabwe) Nick Price (c)	72-71-74-73=290	+2	53,250
35	(United States) Fred Couples (c)	69-73-75-74=291	+3	43,200
T36	(United States) Ben Crane	68-74-77-73=292	+4	40,200
T36	(United States) Joe Durant	69-72-75-76=292	+4	40,200
T38	(Australia) Robert Allenby	67-73-78-75=293	+5	32,800
T38	(United States) J. B. Holmes	71-73-76-73=293	+5	32,800
T38	(England) David Howell	71-71-81-70=293	+5	32,800
T38	(Spain) Miguel Ángel Jiménez	67-74-82-70=293	+5	32,800
T38	(Sweden) Jesper Parnevik	72-72-72-77=293	+5	32,800
T38	(United States) Tim Petrovic	73-69-80-71=293	+5	32,800
T38	(England) Lee Westwood	70-73-73-77=293	+5	32,800
T45	(United States) John Daly	70-73-74-77=294	+6	22,020
T45	(Paraguay) Carlos Franco	71-71-75-77=294	+6	22,020
T45	(United States) Dudley Hart	73-70-75-76=294	+6	22,020
T45	(United States) J. J. Henry	71-73-77-73=294	+6	22,020
T45	(Australia) Peter Lonard	71-73-74-76=294	+6	22,020
T45	(United States) Jeff Maggert	73-69-78-74=294	+6	22,020
T45	(United States) Arron Oberholser	68-71-74-81=294	+6	22,020
T45	(United States) Jeff Sluman	70-73-75-76=294	+6	22,020
T53	(United States) Robert Gamez	71-72-78-74=295	+7	18,613
T53	(United States) Charles Howell III	71-73-76-75=295	+7	18,613
T53	(Australia) Adam Scott (c)	70-67-82-76=295	+7	18,613
T56	(United States) Bart Bryant	73-71-74-78=296	+8	18,160
T56	(United States) Steve Lowery	73-70-78-75=296	+8	18,160
T58	(United States) Zach Johnson	71-73-74-79=297	+9	17,600
T58	(Germany) Bernhard Langer	67-75-79-76=297	+9	17,600
T58	(United States) Rocco Mediate	69-74-77-77=297	+9	17,600
T58	(United States) Sean O'Hair	73-71-75-78=297	+9	17,600
T58	(United States) Joey Sindelar	71-73-80-73=297	+9	17,600
T63	(United States) Steve Flesch	69-70-75-84=298	+10	16,960
T63	(United States) Harrison Frazar	70-74-76-78=298	+10	16,960
T63	(United States) Kirk Triplett	70-71-76-81=298	+10	16,960
T66	(United States) Rich Beem	71-72-71-85=299	+11	16,480
T66	(United States) Olin Browne	69-75-76-79=299	+11	16,480
T66	(Australia) Nathan Green	72-72-75-80=299	+11	16,480
69	(Denmark) Thomas Bjørn	69-73-80-78=300	+12	16,160
T70	(United States) Chad Campbell	70-72-79-80=301	+13	15,920
T70	(Japan) Shingo Katayama	70-73-77-81=301	+13	15,920
72	(United States) Mark Calcavecchia	69-73-81-79=302	+14	15,680
73	(United States) Woody Austin	73-69-83-79=304	+16	15,520
74	(Australia) Mark Hensby	71-73-79-83=306	+18	15,360
CUT	(Australia) Stuart Appleby	73-72=145	+1	
CUT	(United States) Tommy Armour III	73-72=145	+1	
CUT	(United States) Mark Brooks	71-74=145	+1	
CUT	(Argentina) Ángel Cabrera	72-73=145	+1	
CUT	(New Zealand) Michael Campbell	72-73=145	+1	
CUT	(United States) Stewart Cink	73-72=145	+1	
CUT	(Japan) Ryuji Imada	73-72=145	+1	
CUT	(United States) Justin Leonard (c)	75-70=145	+1	
CUT	(Australia) Nick O'Hern	71-74=145	+1	
CUT	(United States) Tag Ridings	70-75=145	+1	
CUT	(Australia) John Senden	73-72=145	+1	
CUT	(United States) Patrick Sheehan	71-74=145	+1	
CUT	(United States) Wes Short Jr.	76-69=145	+1	
CUT	(United States) Dean Wilson	71-74=145	+1	
CUT	(United States) Doug Barron	72-74=146	+2	
CUT	(Republic of Ireland) Pádraig Harrington	73-73=146	+2	
CUT	(United States) Shaun Micheel	75-71=146	+2	
CUT	(United States) Heath Slocum	72-74=146	+2	
CUT	(United States) Billy Andrade	69-78=147	+3	
CUT	(United States) Jeff Brehaut	71-76=147	+3	
CUT	(England) Luke Donald	73-74=147	+3	
CUT	(United States) Brian Gay	75-72=147	+3	
CUT	(United States) Ted Purdy	77-70=147	+3	
CUT	(United States) Brett Quigley	73-74=147	+3	
CUT	(United States) John Huston	73-75=148	+4	
CUT	(United States) Jonathan Kaye	77-71=148	+4	
CUT	(United States) Davis Love III (c)	65-83=148	+4	
CUT	(Scotland) Colin Montgomerie	72-76=148	+4	
CUT	(United States) Kevin Na	74-74=148	+4	
CUT	(United States) Joe Ogilvie	80-68=148	+4	
CUT	(United States) Scott Verplank	75-73=148	+4	
CUT	(United States) Jonathan Byrd	72-77=149	+5	
CUT	(Sweden) Daniel Chopra	70-79=149	+5	
CUT	(South Africa) Tim Clark	77-72=149	+5	
CUT	(United States) Robert Damron	71-78=149	+5	
CUT	(United States) Bob Estes	74-75=149	+5	
CUT	(United States) Tim Herron	72-77=149	+5	
CUT	(United States) Brandt Jobe	75-74=149	+5	
CUT	(United States) Loren Roberts	75-74=149	+5	
CUT	(United States) Kent Jones	76-74=150	+6	
CUT	(Republic of Ireland) Paul McGinley	77-73=150	+6	
CUT	(Australia) Rod Pampling	74-76=150	+6	
CUT	(England) Justin Rose	78-72=150	+6	
CUT	(United States) David Toms	73-77=150	+6	
CUT	(India) Arjun Atwal	76-75=151	+7	
CUT	(United States) David Duval (c)	71-80=151	+7	
CUT	(United States) Lucas Glover	76-75=151	+7	
CUT	(Australia) Stephen Leaney	72-79=151	+7	
CUT	(United States) Billy Mayfair	76-75=151	+7	
CUT	(United States) Kevin Sutherland	74-77=151	+7	
CUT	(United States) J. L. Lewis	76-76=152	+8	
CUT	(Japan) Hidemichi Tanaka	75-77=152	+8	
CUT	(Australia) Aaron Baddeley	77-76=153	+9	
CUT	(United States) Craig Barlow	80-73=153	+9	
CUT	(United States) Ben Curtis	73-80=153	+9	
CUT	(United States) Todd Hamilton	75-78=153	+9	
CUT	(South Africa) Rory Sabbatini	72-81=153	+9	
CUT	(United States) Bob Tway	74-79=153	+9	
CUT	(United States) Jerry Kelly	72-82=154	+10	
CUT	(United States) Ryan Palmer	75-79=154	+10	
CUT	(United States) Corey Pavin	74-80=154	+10	
CUT	(England) Nick Faldo	76-79=155	+11	
CUT	(Australia) Geoff Ogilvy	78-77=155	+11	
CUT	(New Zealand) Craig Perks (c)	79-76=155	+11	
CUT	(United States) Steve Jones	73-84=157	+13	
CUT	(United States) Jason Gore	77-81=158	+14	
CUT	(United States) Scott McCarron	82-76=158	+14	
CUT	(United States) D. J. Trahan	76-83=159	+15	
CUT	(United States) Hank Kuehne	80-80=160	+16	
WD	(Japan) Shigeki Maruyama	78	+6	

==== Scorecard ====
Hole	1	2	3	4	5	6	7	8	9	10	11	12	13	14	15	16	17	18
Par	4	5	3	4	4	4	4	3	5	4	5	4	3	4	4	5	3	4
(Canada) Ames	−9	−10	−10	−10	−10	−11	−11	−11	−11	−9	−10	−10	−11	−11	−12	−14	−14	−14
(South Africa) Goosen	−6	−7	−6	−7	−7	−7	−7	−7	−7	−7	−7	−6	−7	−6	−7	−7	−7	−8
(United States) Furyk	−5	−5	−4	−5	−5	−5	−5	−5	−5	−5	−6	−6	−6	−5	−5	−5	−5	−5
(United States) Perez	−5	−6	−6	−6	−4	−5	−5	−5	−5	−4	−4	−4	−4	−5	−5	−5	−5	−5
(Sweden) Stenson	−5	−5	−5	−5	−5	−5	−5	−5	−5	−5	−5	−4	−4	−4	−4	−5	−5	−5
(Colombia) Villegas	−3	−3	−3	−3	−4	−5	−5	−4	−4	−5	−5	−5	−5	−4	−4	−5	−5	−5
(Fiji) Singh	−7	−7	−7	−6	−5	−5	−5	−5	−3	−3	−4	−3	−3	−2	−2	−3	−3	−3
(Spain) García	−8	−7	−6	−4	−3	−3	−3	−3	-4	−3	−3	-3	-3	−2	−3	−3	−3	−2
(Canada) Weir	−6	−6	−5	−2	−1	−1	−2	−2	−3	E	E	+1	+1	+2	+1	+1	+1	+1

Cumulative tournament scores, relative to par

Eagle	Birdie	Bogey	Double bogey	Triple bogey+
