= 2006 PGA Tour =

Golf tour season

2006 PGA Tour season
- Duration: January 5, 2006 – November 5, 2006
- Number of official events: 48
- Most wins: (United States) Tiger Woods (8)
- Money list: (United States) Tiger Woods
- PGA Tour Player of the Year: (United States) Tiger Woods
- PGA Player of the Year: (United States) Tiger Woods
- Rookie of the Year: (South Africa) Trevor Immelman

The 2006 PGA Tour was the 91st season of the PGA Tour, the main professional golf tour in the United States. It was also the 38th season since separating from the PGA of America.

== Schedule ==
The following table lists official events during the 2006 season.

Date	Tournament	Location	Purse (US$)	Winner (Note: The number in parentheses after each winner's name is the number of PGA Tour events they had won up to and including that tournament. This information is only shown for PGA Tour members.)	OWGR points	Notes
Jan 8	Mercedes Championships	Hawaii	5,400,000	(Australia) Stuart Appleby (7)	46	Winners-only event
Jan 15	Sony Open in Hawaii	Hawaii	5,100,000	(United States) David Toms (12)	52	
Jan 22	Bob Hope Chrysler Classic	California	5,000,000	(United States) Chad Campbell (3)	48	Pro-Am
Jan 29	Buick Invitational	California	5,100,000	(United States) Tiger Woods (47)	56	
Feb 5	FBR Open	Arizona	5,200,000	(United States) J. B. Holmes (1)	58	
Feb 12	AT&T Pebble Beach National Pro-Am	California	5,400,000	(United States) Arron Oberholser (1)	48	Pro-Am
Feb 19	Nissan Open	California	5,100,000	(South Africa) Rory Sabbatini (3)	66	
Feb 26	WGC-Accenture Match Play Championship	California	7,500,000	(Australia) Geoff Ogilvy (2)	76	World Golf Championship
Feb 26	Chrysler Classic of Tucson	Arizona	3,000,000	(United States) Kirk Triplett (3)	24	Alternate event
Mar 5	Ford Championship at Doral	Florida	5,500,000	(United States) Tiger Woods (48)	66	
Mar 12	The Honda Classic	Florida	5,500,000	(England) Luke Donald (2)	44	
Mar 19	Bay Hill Invitational	Florida	5,500,000	(Australia) Rod Pampling (2)	68	Invitational
Mar 26	The Players Championship	Florida	8,000,000	(Canada) Stephen Ames (2)	80	Flagship event
Apr 2	BellSouth Classic	Georgia	5,300,000	(United States) Phil Mickelson (28)	52	
Apr 9	Masters Tournament	Georgia	7,000,000	(United States) Phil Mickelson (29)	100	Major championship
Apr 16	Verizon Heritage	South Carolina	5,300,000	(Australia) Aaron Baddeley (1)	54	Invitational
Apr 23	Shell Houston Open	Texas	5,300,000	(Australia) Stuart Appleby (8)	44	
Apr 30	Zurich Classic of New Orleans	Louisiana	6,000,000	(United States) Chris Couch (1)	48	
May 7	Wachovia Championship	North Carolina	6,000,000	(United States) Jim Furyk (11)	66	
May 14	EDS Byron Nelson Championship	Texas	6,200,000	(United States) Brett Wetterich (1)	58	
May 21	Bank of America Colonial	Texas	6,000,000	(United States) Tim Herron (4)	54	Invitational
May 28	FedEx St. Jude Classic	Tennessee	5,200,000	(United States) Jeff Maggert (3)	32	
Jun 4	Memorial Tournament	Ohio	5,750,000	(Sweden) Carl Pettersson (2)	68	Invitational
Jun 11	Barclays Classic	New York	5,750,000	(Fiji) Vijay Singh (29)	68	
Jun 18	U.S. Open	New York	6,800,000	(Australia) Geoff Ogilvy (3)	100	Major championship
Jun 27	Booz Allen Classic	Maryland	5,000,000	(United States) Ben Curtis (2)	32	
Jul 2	Buick Championship	Connecticut	4,400,000	(United States) J. J. Henry (1)	40	
Jul 9	Cialis Western Open	Illinois	5,000,000	(South Africa) Trevor Immelman (1)	60	
Jul 16	John Deere Classic	Illinois	4,000,000	(Australia) John Senden (1)	24	
Jul 23	The Open Championship	England	£4,000,000	(United States) Tiger Woods (49)	100	Major championship
Jul 23	B.C. Open	New York	3,000,000	(United States) John Rollins (2)	24	Alternate event
Jul 30	U.S. Bank Championship in Milwaukee	Wisconsin	4,000,000	(United States) Corey Pavin (15)	30	
Aug 6	Buick Open	Michigan	4,800,000	(United States) Tiger Woods (50)	54	
Aug 13	The International	Colorado	5,500,000	(United States) Dean Wilson (1)	52	
Aug 20	PGA Championship	Illinois	6,800,000	(United States) Tiger Woods (51)	100	Major championship
Aug 27	WGC-Bridgestone Invitational	Ohio	7,500,000	(United States) Tiger Woods (52)	76	World Golf Championship
Aug 27	Reno–Tahoe Open	Nevada	3,000,000	(United States) Will MacKenzie (1)	24	Alternate event
Sep 4	Deutsche Bank Championship	Massachusetts	5,500,000	(United States) Tiger Woods (53)	46	
Sep 10	Canadian Open	Canada	5,000,000	(United States) Jim Furyk (12)	46	
Sep 17	84 Lumber Classic	Pennsylvania	4,600,000	(United States) Ben Curtis (3)	40	
Sep 24	Valero Texas Open	Texas	4,000,000	(United States) Eric Axley (1)	24	
Oct 1	WGC-American Express Championship	England	7,500,000	(United States) Tiger Woods (54)	70	World Golf Championship
Oct 1	Southern Farm Bureau Classic	Mississippi	3,000,000	(United States) D. J. Trahan (1)	24	Alternate event
Oct 8	Chrysler Classic of Greensboro	North Carolina	5,000,000	(United States) Davis Love III (19)	36	
Oct 15	Frys.com Open	Nevada	4,000,000	(United States) Troy Matteson (1)	42	
Oct 22	Funai Classic at the Walt Disney World Resort	Florida	4,600,000	(United States) Joe Durant (4)	48	
Oct 29	Chrysler Championship	Florida	5,300,000	(South Korea) K. J. Choi (4)	56	
Nov 5	The Tour Championship	Georgia	6,500,000	(Australia) Adam Scott (4)	52	Tour Championship

=== Unofficial events ===
The following events were sanctioned by the PGA Tour, but did not carry official money, nor were wins official.

Date	Tournament	Location	Purse ($)	Winner(s)	Notes
Mar 28	Tavistock Cup	Florida	2,000,000	Team Isleworth	Team event
Jun 20	CVS/pharmacy Charity Classic	Rhode Island	1,300,000	(South Africa) Tim Clark and (Zimbabwe) Nick Price	Team event
Sep 24	Ryder Cup	Ireland	n/a	Team Europe	Team event
Nov 12	Merrill Lynch Shootout	Florida	2,750,000	(United States) Jerry Kelly and (Australia) Rod Pampling	Team event
Nov 14	Wendy's 3-Tour Challenge	Nevada	1,000,000	PGA Tour	Team event
Nov 22	PGA Grand Slam of Golf	Hawaii	1,250,000	(United States) Tiger Woods	Limited-field event
Nov 26	LG Skins Game	California	1,000,000	(Canada) Stephen Ames	Limited-field event
Dec 11	WGC-World Cup	Barbados	4,000,000	(Germany) Bernhard Langer and (Germany) Marcel Siem	World Golf Championship; Team event
Dec 17	Target World Challenge	California	5,750,000	(United States) Tiger Woods	Limited-field event

== Location of tournaments ==
Location of official tournaments of the 2006 PGA Tour in the continental United States and Canada.
Players & Majors
World Golf Championships
Regular events
Alternate events
Tour Championship
Location of official tournaments of the 2006 PGA Tour outside the continental United States and Canada.
Players & Majors
World Golf Championships
Regular events

== Money list ==
The money list was based on prize money won during the season, calculated in U.S. dollars.

Position	Player	Prize money ($)
1	(United States) Tiger Woods	9,941,563
2	(United States) Jim Furyk	7,213,316
3	(Australia) Adam Scott	4,978,858
4	(Fiji) Vijay Singh	4,602,416
5	(Australia) Geoff Ogilvy	4,354,969
6	(United States) Phil Mickelson	4,256,505
7	(South Africa) Trevor Immelman	3,844,189
8	(Australia) Stuart Appleby	3,470,457
9	(England) Luke Donald	3,177,408
10	(United States) Brett Wetterich	3,023,185

== Awards ==
Award	Winner	Ref.
PGA Tour Player of the Year (Jack Nicklaus Trophy)	(United States) Tiger Woods	
PGA Player of the Year	(United States) Tiger Woods	
Rookie of the Year	(South Africa) Trevor Immelman	
Scoring leader (PGA Tour – Byron Nelson Award)	(United States) Tiger Woods	
Scoring leader (PGA – Vardon Trophy)	(United States) Jim Furyk	
Comeback Player of the Year	(United States) Steve Stricker	

== See also ==
- 2006 in golf
- 2006 Champions Tour
- 2006 Nationwide Tour
