= Sean Foley (golf instructor) =

Canadian golf instructor

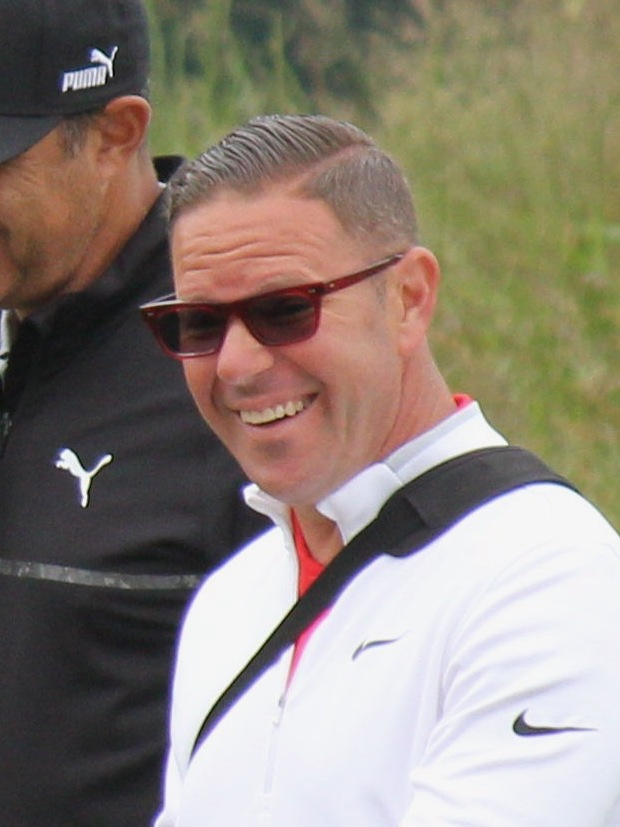
- Foley in 2018.

Personal information
- Born: 1974 (age 51–52) Burlington, Ontario
- Education: Tennessee State University
- Occupation: Golf instructor

Sean Foley (born 1974 in Burlington, Ontario) is a Canadian born golf instructor, who resides in Orlando, Florida and has coached Tiger Woods, Tom Kim, Michael Thorbjonsen, Lydia Ko, Sean O'Hair, Hunter Mahan, Stephen Ames, An Byeong-hun, Cameron Champ, Michael Kim, Erik van Rooyen, Sam Horsfield, Justin Rose and Lee Westwood, as well as other PGA Tour, LPGA Tour and LIV Golf professionals. Foley also coached many players on PGA Tour Canada, including players such as Chris Baryla. Foley began working with Tiger Woods during the summer of 2010.

Foley was the head coach for the Canadian Junior Golf Association, taught at Core Golf Junior Academy at Orange County National, Winter Garden, Florida, and now operates Sean Foley Performance, a golf school for players of all abilities in Orlando, Florida.

Foley graduated with an Arts degree from Tennessee State University, where he played on the varsity golf team. Foley did not aim for a professional golf playing career, but had set a goal in his mid-teens of becoming an instructor to top players, after watching David Leadbetter work with Nick Faldo on the range at the RBC Canadian Open at Glen Abbey Golf Course in the early 1990s.

Foley left the Clublink Academy at Glen Abbey in Oakville, Ontario, and moved to Orlando, Florida in August 2006.

Foley is represented by agent Chris Armstrong of the Wasserman Media Group.

Foley is a member of the faculty of Revolution Golf, a company that markets golf instruction videos and related content.

== Coaching Tiger Woods ==
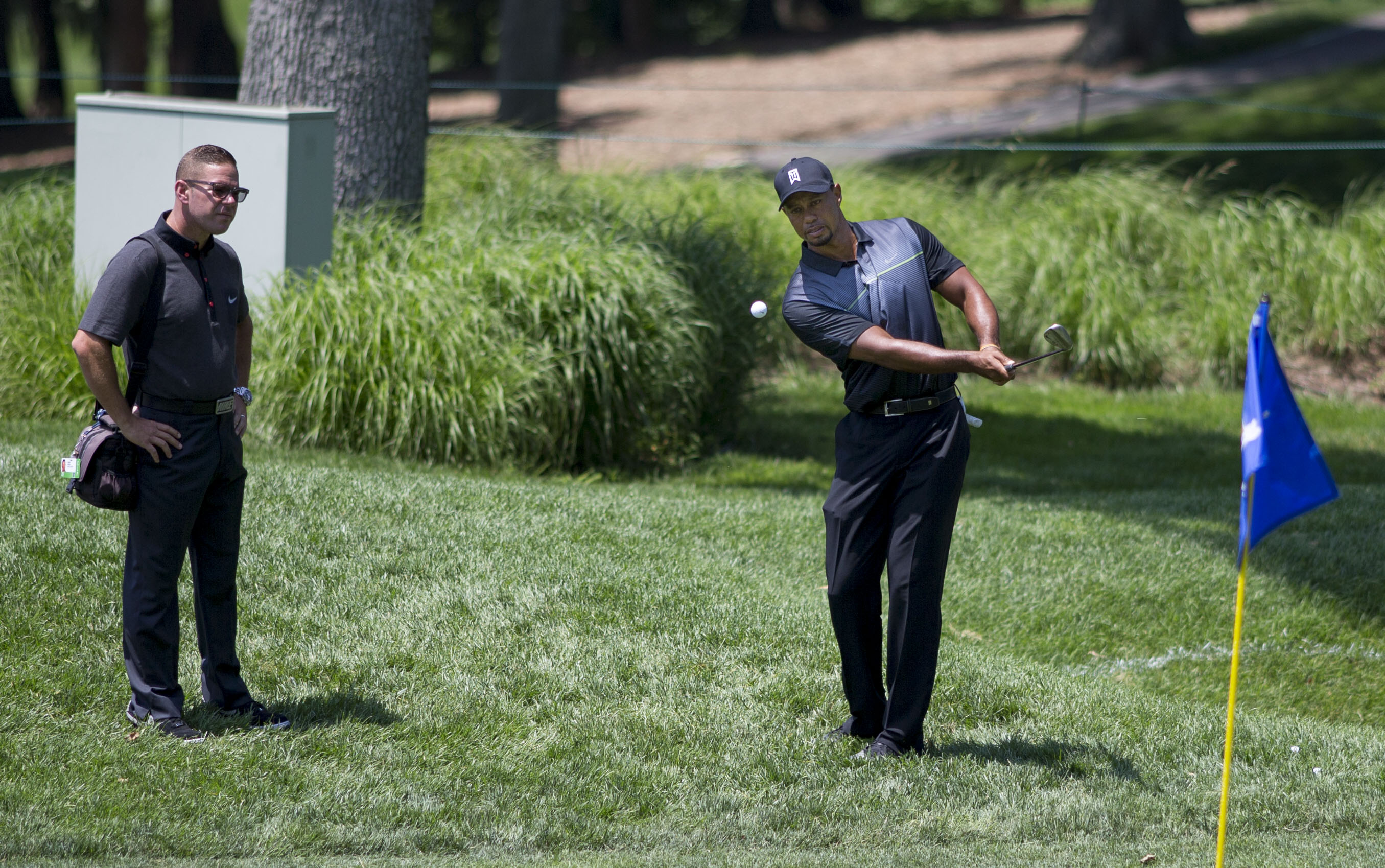
Foley with Woods in 2014

In May 2010, Foley denied widely spread rumors that he was about to be hired as coach by Tiger Woods On August 10, 2010, Foley helped Tiger Woods with his swing during a practice round at the PGA Championship, and confirmed the possibility of working with Woods. Foley and Woods continued to work together until Woods announced in August 2014 he would no longer use an instructor.

Foley and Woods have made several changes to Woods' swing since late 2010. Foley has taught Woods to stay more centered over the ball and increase weight on the left side through the downswing. Foley also teaches forward shaft lean at impact, which has resulted in Woods saying that he has gotten the distance back that he had earlier in his career. Woods' swing is now steeper than it was when he worked with previous instructor Hank Haney, and he no longer bows his left wrist at the top of the swing as much as he did before hiring Foley. Perhaps the most notable swing difference is that Woods is now a fade-biased golfer for the first time in his career. Woods and Foley worked on a more out-to-in swing path, trying to avoid coming from the inside and getting "stuck," which was an issue of Woods'. Woods had clear difficulty hitting draws in the earlier portion of this process, but began to work the ball both ways well in 2013.

Woods struggled in the first few months of 2011 and then took several months off in the summer due to injury. Woods' first win with Foley came at his own Chevron World Challenge in December 2011. He then won three PGA Tour events in 2012 and was in contention in each of the final three majors of the year, but played below average on the weekends and fell short of victory. Woods won three of his first five stroke-play events in 2013 and returned to the No. 1 world ranking, and then won The Players Championship for the second time in his career in May. In 2013, Woods won five PGA Tour events, but only contended in two of the major championships. A lower back injury that Woods said began during the summer months began to worsen towards the end of the season.

Woods worked to rehab the back injury during the winter months. He finished second in a playoff to Zach Johnson at his own Northwestern Mutual World Challenge in December. However, Woods began the 2014 season with poor finishes in his first two events. During the final round of the Honda Classic in March, Woods withdrew, citing the back injury. He would return the next week in Doral but clearly looked to be in pain for much of the time, although he did post a 25th-place finish—the best finish he would post in the 2014 season.

Woods announced in late March that he was skipping the Masters Tournament after undergoing a procedure to repair a bulging disc in his lower back. He subsequently missed the next three months and returned at the Quicken Loans National in July. His swing was visibly shorter, one adjustment of several that Woods and Foley said they made to protect his back until it was fully recovered. Woods missed the cut in his first event back and then finished T69 in the British Open. He struggled with his driving accuracy in the weeks after returning from the surgery.

In the final round of the WGC-Bridgestone Invitational, at which he was the defending champion, Woods withdrew on the 13th hole citing another back injury. He later revealed that he "jarred" an area of his lower back when jumping down into a deep bunker after hitting an awkward shot earlier in the final round. He attempted to play the following week at the PGA Championship but was in visible discomfort and struggled mightily, missing the cut.

On August 25, 2014, Woods announced on his website that he will no longer be working with Foley, stating "With my next tournament not until my World Challenge event at Isleworth in Orlando, this is the right time to end our professional relationship." Foley added, "My time spent with Tiger is one of the highlights of my career so far, and I am appreciative of the many experiences we shared together. It was a lifelong ambition of mine to teach the best player of all time in our sport. I am both grateful of the things we had the opportunity to learn from one another, as well as the enduring friendship we have built. I have nothing but admiration and respect for him."

== Instruction style ==
Foley is known for claiming a scientific approach to the golf swing. One of his trainees, Justin Rose, said of Foley's instruction style:

Sean does not look at me as a golfer. He looks at me as an athlete and from a biomechanical point of view. He is not necessarily wrapped up in what makes a swing pretty. He wants what works for me from a scientific point of view. This is not necessarily the position that everyone strives for, but that is what I like about Sean.

Foley recommends setting up with about 55% of the body weight on the left side (for right-handed golfers) and keeping it left during the whole swing until contact with the ball, when close to 80% of the weight should be on the left foot. This is the same setup and weight shift instructors Mike Bennett and Andy Plummer prescribe. Foley acknowledges the resemblance and says it is because they all studied the swings of old players that kept centered over the ball during the whole swing. Foley stated that he has "a lot of admiration and respect" for his friend Andy Plummer.
