= 2008 WGC-CA Championship =

Coordinates: 25°49′10″N 80°20′34″W

Tournament information
- Dates: March 20–23, 2008
- Location: Doral, Florida, U.S.
- Course(s): Doral Golf Resort & Spa
- Tour(s): PGA Tour; European Tour

Statistics
- Par: 72
- Length: 7,266
- Field: 79 players
- Cut: None
- Prize fund: $8,000,000
- Winner's share: $1,350,000

Champion
- (Australia) Geoff Ogilvy
- 271 (−17)

The 2008 WGC-CA Championship was a golf tournament that was contested from March 20–23 at Doral Golf Resort & Spa in Doral, Florida. It was the ninth WGC-CA Championship tournament, and the second of three World Golf Championships events held in 2008.

Geoff Ogilvy won the tournament to capture his second World Golf Championships title. Tiger Woods was the 3-time defending champion but finished in 5th place.

== Field ==
1. Top 50 players from the Official World Golf Rankings two weeks prior to event
Robert Allenby (2,3), Stephen Ames (2), Stuart Appleby (2), Woody Austin (2,3), Aaron Baddeley (2,3), Ángel Cabrera (2,6), Mark Calcavecchia (2,3), Paul Casey (2,6), K. J. Choi (2,3,4,5), Stewart Cink (2,3,4,5), Tim Clark (2,3), Luke Donald (2), Ernie Els (2,3,6,7), Niclas Fasth (2,6), Jim Furyk (2,3), Sergio García (2,3,6), Retief Goosen (2,6), Richard Green, Søren Hansen (2,6), Charles Howell III (2,3), Trevor Immelman (2), Miguel Ángel Jiménez (2,7,8), Zach Johnson (2,3), Robert Karlsson (2), Martin Kaymer (2,7,8), Justin Leonard (2,4,5), Hunter Mahan (2,3), Phil Mickelson (2,3,4,5), Arron Oberholser (2), Geoff Ogilvy (2,3), Sean O'Hair (2,5), Nick O'Hern (2), Ian Poulter (2), Andrés Romero (2,6), Justin Rose (2,3,6), Rory Sabbatini (2,3), Adam Scott (2,3,7,8), Vijay Singh (2,3,5,7,8), Brandt Snedeker (2,3), Henrik Stenson (2,6,7,8), Richard Sterne (2,6), Steve Stricker (2,3,4,5), Toru Taniguchi (2,10), Scott Verplank (2,3), Boo Weekley (2,3), Mike Weir (2), Lee Westwood (2,6,7,8), Brett Wetterich (3), Tiger Woods (2,3,4,5)

- Pádraig Harrington (2,3,6) did not play.

2. Top 50 players from the Official World Golf Rankings one week prior to event
Nick Dougherty (6), Shingo Katayama (10)

3. Top 30 from the final 2007 PGA Tour FedEx Cup points list
Jonathan Byrd, John Rollins, Heath Slocum, Camilo Villegas

4. Top 10 from the PGA Tour FedEx Cup points list two weeks prior to event
Daniel Chopra, J. B. Holmes (5), Ryuji Imada (5), D. J. Trahan

5. Top 10 from the PGA Tour FedEx Cup points list one week prior to event

6. Top 20 from the final 2007 European Tour Order of Merit
Anders Hansen, Peter Hanson, Grégory Havret, Søren Kjeldsen, Colin Montgomerie, Graeme Storm

7. Top 10 from the European Tour Order of Merit two weeks prior to event
Mark Brown (8), Shiv Chawrasia, Ross Fisher (8)

8. Top 10 from the European Tour Order of Merit one week prior to event
Graeme McDowell, Jeev Milkha Singh

9. Top 3 from the final 2007 Asian Tour Order of Merit
Anton Haig, Liang Wenchong, Chapchai Nirat

10. Top 3 from the final 2007 Japan Golf Tour Order of Merit
Brendan Jones

11. Top 3 from the final 2007 PGA Tour of Australasia Order of Merit
Craig Parry, Paul Sheehan

- David Smail did not play.

12. Top 3 from the final 2007 Sunshine Tour Order of Merit
James Kingston, Andrew McLardy, Louis Oosthuizen

== Round summaries ==
=== First round ===
Place	Player	Score	To par
T1	(Spain) Miguel Ángel Jiménez	65	−7
T1	(Australia) Geoff Ogilvy	65	−7
3	(United States) Stewart Cink	66	−6
T4	(Denmark) Anders Hansen	67	−5
T4	(United States) Phil Mickelson	67	−5
T4	(Australia) Nick O'Hern	67	−5
T4	(Australia) Adam Scott	67	−5
T4	(United States) Tiger Woods	67	−5
T9	(United States) Mark Calcavecchia	68	−4
T9	(England) Luke Donald	68	−4
T9	(England) Ross Fisher	68	−4
T9	(France) Grégory Havret	68	−4
T9	(Japan) Ryuji Imada	68	−4
T9	(Sweden) Robert Karlsson	68	−4
T9	(Germany) Martin Kaymer	68	−4
T9	(Argentina) Andrés Romero	68	−4
T9	(India) Jeev Milkha Singh	68	−4
T9	(Japan) Toru Taniguchi	68	−4

=== Second round ===
Place	Player	Score	To par
1	(Australia) Geoff Ogilvy	65-67=132	−12
2	(United States) Tiger Woods	67-66=133	−11
3	(Australia) Adam Scott	67-68=135	−9
T4	(Denmark) Anders Hansen	67-71=138	−6
T4	(Sweden) Robert Karlsson	68-70=138	−6
T4	(India) Jeev Milkha Singh	68-70=138	−6
T7	(United States) Mark Calcavecchia	68-71=139	−5
T7	(Spain) Miguel Ángel Jiménez	65-74=139	−5
T7	(United States) Steve Stricker	71-68=139	−5
T10	(United States) Woody Austin	70-70=140	−4
T10	(South Korea) K. J. Choi	70-70=140	−4
T10	(United States) Stewart Cink	66-74=140	−4
T10	(South Africa) Tim Clark	71-69=140	−4
T10	(England) Luke Donald	68-72=140	−4
T10	(United States) Jim Furyk	69-71=140	−4
T10	(South Africa) Retief Goosen	71-69=140	−4
T10	(Denmark) Søren Kjeldsen	69-71=140	−4
T10	(Thailand) Chapchai Nirat	70-70=140	−4
T10	(Argentina) Andrés Romero	68-72=140	−4

=== Third round ===
Place	Player	Score	To par
1	(Australia) Geoff Ogilvy	65-67-68=200	−16
T2	(United States) Jim Furyk	69-71-64=204	−12
T2	(South Africa) Retief Goosen	71-69-64=204	−12
T2	(Australia) Adam Scott	67-68-69=204	−12
T2	(Fiji) Vijay Singh	73-68-63=204	−12
T2	(England) Graeme Storm	71-70-63=204	−12
T7	(Denmark) Anders Hansen	67-71-67=205	−11
T7	(United States) Tiger Woods	67-66-72=205	−11
9	(South Africa) Tim Clark	71-69-66=206	−10
10	(South Korea) K. J. Choi	70-70-67=207	−9

=== Final round ===
Place	Player	Score	To par	Winnings ($)
1	(Australia) Geoff Ogilvy	65-67-68-71=271	−17	1,350,000
T2	(United States) Jim Furyk	69-71-64-68=272	−16	530,000
T2	(South Africa) Retief Goosen	71-69-64-68=272	−16	530,000
T2	(Fiji) Vijay Singh	73-68-63-68=272	−16	530,000
5	(United States) Tiger Woods	67-66-72-68=273	−15	285,000
T6	(Australia) Nick O'Hern	67-75-67-66=275	−13	198,333
T6	(England) Graeme Storm	71-70-63-71=275	−13	198,333
T6	(United States) Steve Stricker	71-68-73-63=275	−13	198,333
T9	(United States) Zach Johnson	69-72-67-68=276	−12	147,500
T9	(Australia) Adam Scott	67-68-69-72=276	−12	147,500

==== Scorecard ====
Final round

Hole	1	2	3	4	5	6	7	8	9	10	11	12	13	14	15	16	17	18
Par	5	4	4	3	4	4	4	5	3	5	4	5	3	4	3	4	4	4
(Australia) Ogilvy	−17	−17	−17	−17	−17	−18	−17	−17	−17	−17	−17	−17	−17	−17	−17	−17	−17	−17
(United States) Furyk	−13	−12	−11	−11	−12	−13	−14	−15	−15	−15	−15	−15	−15	−14	−15	−15	−16	−16
(South Africa) Goosen	−13	−13	−12	−13	−13	−13	−13	−14	−14	−14	−14	−14	−14	−15	−15	−16	−16	−16
(Fiji) Singh	−12	−12	−12	−12	−13	−13	−13	−14	−15	−16	−16	−16	−15	−14	−14	−15	−16	−16
(United States) Woods	−12	−13	−12	−11	−11	−12	−12	−13	−12	−12	−12	−13	−13	−13	−14	−14	−15	−15
(Australia) O'Hern	−8	−7	−8	−8	−8	−9	−10	−10	−10	−11	−12	−12	−13	−13	−13	−13	−13	−13
(England) Storm	−12	−13	−13	−13	−14	−14	−14	−14	−14	−14	−14	−14	−13	−13	−13	−13	−13	−13
(United States) Stricker	−5	−5	−5	−5	−6	−7	−8	−9	−10	−11	−11	−12	−12	−12	−12	−13	−13	−13
(Australia) Scott	−13	−13	−13	−13	−13	−14	−14	−14	−13	−13	−12	−12	−12	−11	−11	−12	−12	−12

Cumulative tournament scores, relative to par

Birdie	Bogey
