= Geoff Ogilvy =

Australian professional golfer (born 1977)

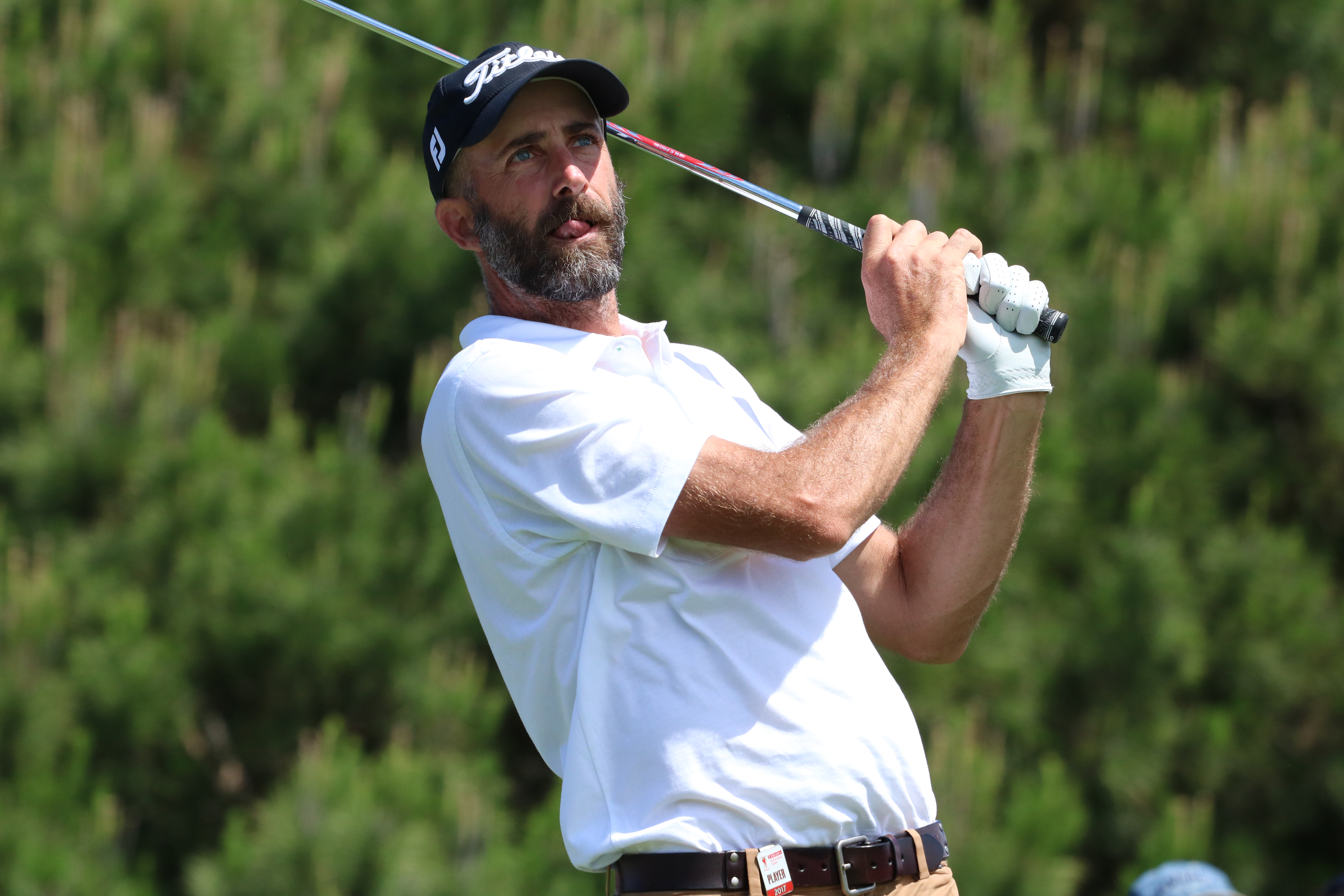
- Ogilvy in 2017

Personal information
- Full name: Geoff Charles Ogilvy
- Nationality: Australia
- Born: 11 June 1977 (age 49) Adelaide, South Australia
- Height: 6 ft 2 in (1.88 m)
- Weight: 180 lb (82 kg; 13 st)
- Spouse: Bree Laughlin
- Children: 3

Career
- Sport: Golf
- Turned professional: 1998
- Current tours: PGA Tour; PGA Tour of Australasia
- Former tour: European Tour
- Professional wins: 12
- Highest ranking: 3 (29 June 2008)

Number of wins by tour
- PGA Tour: 8
- European Tour: 4
- PGA Tour of Australasia: 2
- Other: 2

Best results in major championships (wins: 1)
- Masters Tournament: T4: 2011
- PGA Championship: T6: 2005, 2007
- U.S. Open: Won: 2006
- The Open Championship: T5: 2005

Achievements and awards
- PGA Tour of Australasia Rookie of the Year: 1998–99
- PGA Tour of Australasia Order of Merit winner: 2010

Geoff Charles Ogilvy (born 11 June 1977) is an Australian professional golfer. He won the 2006 U.S. Open and has also won three World Golf Championships.

== Early life ==
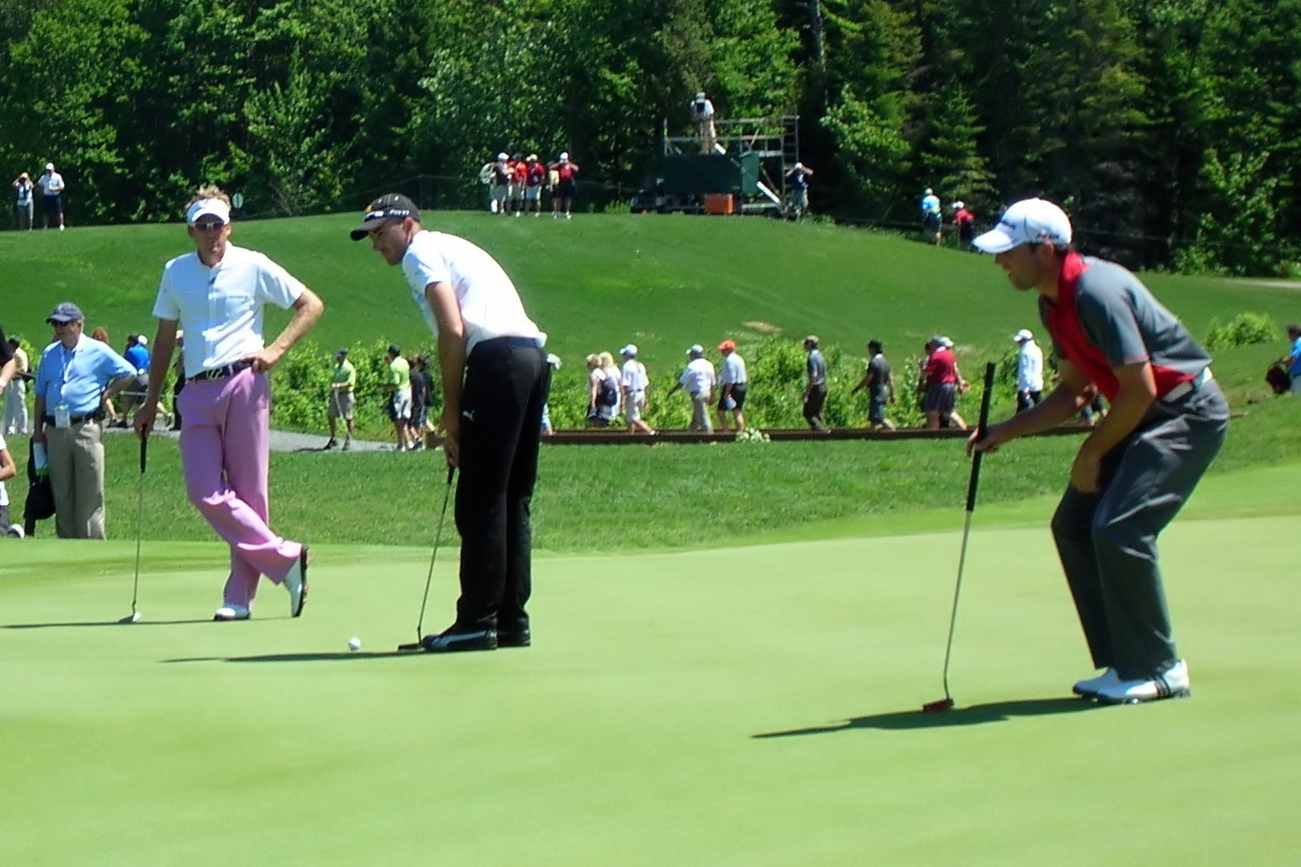
Geoff Ogilvy with Ian Poulter and Sergio García at the 2009 Telus World Skins Game in Lévis, Canada

Ogilvy was born in Adelaide, South Australia, to an English-born father Mike and Australian mother Judy.

== Professional career ==
Ogilvy turned professional in May 1998 and he won a European Tour card at that year's Qualifying school. He played on the European Tour in 1999 and 2000, finishing 65th in his first season and improving to 48th in his second. He joined the U.S. based PGA Tour in 2001, and finished in the top 100 in each of his first five seasons. His first professional tournament win came in 2005 at the PGA Tour's Chrysler Classic of Tucson. In February 2006 he beat Davis Love III in the final of the 2006 WGC-Accenture Match Play Championship.

Ogilvy won his first major championship at the 2006 U.S. Open, becoming the first Australian to win a men's golf major since Steve Elkington at the 1995 PGA Championship. Ogilvy finished his round with a champion's flourish, making improbable pars on each of the last two holes. He holed a 30-foot chip shot at the 17th, and then got up-and-down for par at the 18th, dropping a downhill six-footer for his final stroke as all his competitors collapsed around him. Phil Mickelson and Colin Montgomerie needed pars on the final hole to win, or bogeys to tie with Ogilvy, but they ruined their chances by producing double-bogey sixes to give Ogilvy a dramatic win. Jim Furyk needed par to force a playoff but bogeyed the final hole.

This success moved Ogilvy into the top ten of the Official World Golf Rankings for the first time, at Number 8. He reached his highest placing to date on 9 July 2006 when he was ranked Number 7, and he returned to that rank in February 2007 after finishing as runner-up to Henrik Stenson while defending his title at the 2007 WGC-Accenture Match Play Championship. He has spent over 120 weeks in the top-10 of the rankings.

Ogilvy won the 2008 WGC-CA Championship, his second World Golf Championship title, by one shot shooting 17-under par. It was his first PGA Tour win since the 2006 U.S. Open. In his next start at the 2008 Shell Houston Open he finished tied for second moving him up to number 5 in the Official World Golf Rankings. In late June 2008, he rose to 3rd in the rankings. In 2009 Ogilvy continued his success at the WGC-Accenture Match Play Championship defeating Paul Casey. Ogilvy moved into second alone in World Golf Championship wins. This win brought him up to fourth in the Official World Golf Rankings.

In January 2010, Ogilvy won the SBS Championship, the opening event of the 2010 PGA Tour.

Ogilvy won the 2014 Barracuda Championship, a tournament that uses the modified Stableford scoring system, with a winning score of 49 points. It was his first victory in over four years.

== Personal ==
Geoff Ogilvy married Juli in 2004, and the couple had three children before divorcing in 2020. He later married Australian television personality Bree Laughlin on 20 June 2024 in Las Vegas.

== Amateur wins ==
- 1995 Portsea Open Amateur
- 1996 German Amateur Open Championship
- 1997 Victorian Amateur Championship, Lake Macquarie Amateur

== Professional wins (12) ==
=== PGA Tour wins (8) ===
Legend
Major championships (1)
World Golf Championships (3)
Other PGA Tour (4)

| No. | Date | Tournament | Winning score | Margin of victory | Runner(s)-up |
|---|---|---|---|---|---|
| 1 | 27 Feb 2005 | Chrysler Classic of Tucson | −19 (65-66-67-71=269) | Playoff | (United States) Mark Calcavecchia, (United States) Kevin Na |
| 2 | 26 Feb 2006 | WGC-Accenture Match Play Championship | 3 and 2 | | (United States) Davis Love III |
| 3 | 18 Jun 2006 | U.S. Open | +5 (71-70-72-72=285) | 1 stroke | (United States) Jim Furyk, (United States) Phil Mickelson, (Scotland) Colin Montgomerie |
| 4 | 24 Mar 2008 | WGC-CA Championship | −17 (65-67-68-71=271) | 1 stroke | (United States) Jim Furyk, (South Africa) Retief Goosen, (Fiji) Vijay Singh |
| 5 | 11 Jan 2009 | Mercedes-Benz Championship | −24 (67-68-65-68=268) | 6 strokes | (United States) Anthony Kim, (United States) Davis Love III |
| 6 | 1 Mar 2009 | WGC-Accenture Match Play Championship (2) | 4 and 3 | | (England) Paul Casey |
| 7 | 10 Jan 2010 | SBS Championship (2) | −22 (69-66-68-67=270) | 1 stroke | (South Africa) Rory Sabbatini |
| 8 | 3 Aug 2014 | Barracuda Championship | 49 pts (16-7-12-14=49) | 5 points | (United States) Justin Hicks |

PGA Tour playoff record (1–0)

| No. | Year | Tournament | Opponents | Result |
|---|---|---|---|---|
| 1 | 2005 | Chrysler Classic of Tucson | (United States) Mark Calcavecchia, (United States) Kevin Na | Won with birdie on second extra hole Calcavecchia eliminated by par on first hole |

=== European Tour wins (4) ===
Legend
Major championships (1)
World Golf Championships (3)
Other European Tour (0)

| No. | Date | Tournament | Winning score | Margin of victory | Runner(s)-up |
|---|---|---|---|---|---|
| 1 | 26 Feb 2006 | WGC-Accenture Match Play Championship | 3 and 2 | | (United States) Davis Love III |
| 2 | 18 Jun 2006 | U.S. Open | +5 (71-70-72-72=285) | 1 stroke | (United States) Jim Furyk, (United States) Phil Mickelson, (Scotland) Colin Montgomerie |
| 3 | 23 Mar 2008 | WGC-CA Championship | −17 (65-67-68-71=271) | 1 stroke | (United States) Jim Furyk, (South Africa) Retief Goosen, (Fiji) Vijay Singh |
| 4 | 1 Mar 2009 | WGC-Accenture Match Play Championship (2) | 4 and 3 | | (England) Paul Casey |

=== PGA Tour of Australasia wins (2) ===
Legend
Flagship events (1)
Other PGA Tour of Australasia (1)

| No. | Date | Tournament | Winning score | Margin of victory | Runner(s)-up |
|---|---|---|---|---|---|
| 1 | 7 Dec 2008 | Cadbury Schweppes Australian PGA Championship | −14 (67-71-67-69=274) | 2 strokes | (Australia) Mathew Goggin |
| 2 | 5 Dec 2010 | Australian Open^{1} | −19 (68-65-67-69=269) | 4 strokes | (Australia) Matt Jones, (Australia) Alistair Presnell |

^{1}Co-sanctioned by the OneAsia Tour

PGA Tour of Australasia playoff record (0–1)

| No. | Year | Tournament | Opponent | Result |
|---|---|---|---|---|
| 1 | 2010 | Australian PGA Championship | (Australia) Peter Senior | Lost to par on second extra hole |

=== Other wins (2) ===
- 1998 Tasmanian Open
- 2009 Telus World Skins Game

== Major championships ==
=== Wins (1) ===
| Year | Championship | 54 holes | Winning score | Margin | Runners-up |
|---|---|---|---|---|---|
| 2006 | U.S. Open | 1 shot deficit | +5 (71-70-72-72=285) | 1 stroke | (United States) Phil Mickelson, (Scotland) Colin Montgomerie, (United States) Jim Furyk |

=== Results timeline ===
| Tournament | 1999 | 2000 | 2001 | 2002 | 2003 | 2004 | 2005 | 2006 | 2007 | 2008 | 2009 |
|---|---|---|---|---|---|---|---|---|---|---|---|
| Masters Tournament | | | | | | | | T16 | T24 | T39 | T15 |
| U.S. Open | | | | | CUT | | T28 | 1 | T42 | T9 | T47 |
| The Open Championship | CUT | | CUT | | | | T5 | T16 | CUT | CUT | CUT |
| PGA Championship | | | | | T27 | T24 | T6 | T9 | T6 | T31 | T43 |

| Tournament | 2010 | 2011 | 2012 | 2013 | 2014 | 2015 | 2016 |
|---|---|---|---|---|---|---|---|
| Masters Tournament | T26 | T4 | T19 | | | 48 | |
| U.S. Open | CUT | CUT | CUT | T32 | CUT | T18 | CUT |
| The Open Championship | CUT | CUT | T9 | T44 | | T40 | |
| PGA Championship | CUT | CUT | T11 | CUT | T46 | CUT | |

Win
Top 10
Did not play

CUT = missed the half-way cut
"T" = tied

=== Summary ===
| Tournament | Wins | 2nd | 3rd | Top-5 | Top-10 | Top-25 | Events | Cuts made |
|---|---|---|---|---|---|---|---|---|
| Masters Tournament | 0 | 0 | 0 | 1 | 1 | 5 | 8 | 8 |
| U.S. Open | 1 | 0 | 0 | 1 | 2 | 3 | 13 | 7 |
| The Open Championship | 0 | 0 | 0 | 1 | 2 | 3 | 12 | 5 |
| PGA Championship | 0 | 0 | 0 | 0 | 3 | 5 | 13 | 9 |
| Totals | 1 | 0 | 0 | 3 | 8 | 16 | 46 | 29 |

- Most consecutive cuts made – 11 (2003 PGA – 2007 U.S. Open)
- Longest streak of top-10s – 2 (2005 Open Championship – 2005 PGA)

== Results in The Players Championship ==
| Tournament | 2002 | 2003 | 2004 | 2005 | 2006 | 2007 | 2008 | 2009 | 2010 | 2011 | 2012 | 2013 | 2014 | 2015 | 2016 | 2017 | 2018 |
|---|---|---|---|---|---|---|---|---|---|---|---|---|---|---|---|---|---|
| The Players Championship | CUT | T21 | T16 | CUT | CUT | T37 | CUT | T22 | CUT | WD | T12 | CUT | 69 | T24 | | | CUT |

Did not play

CUT = missed the halfway cut
WD = withdrew
"T" indicates a tie for a place

== World Golf Championships ==
=== Wins (3) ===
| Year | Championship | 54 holes | Winning score | Margin | Runner(s)-up |
|---|---|---|---|---|---|
| 2006 | WGC-Accenture Match Play Championship | n/a | 3 and 2 | | (United States) Davis Love III |
| 2008 | WGC-CA Championship | 4 strokes | −17 (65-67-68-71=271) | 1 stroke | (United States) Jim Furyk, (South Africa) Retief Goosen, (Fiji) Vijay Singh |
| 2009 | WGC-Accenture Match Play Championship (2) | n/a | 4 and 3 | | (England) Paul Casey |

=== Results timeline ===
Results not in chronological order prior to 2015.

| Tournament | 2005 | 2006 | 2007 | 2008 | 2009 | 2010 | 2011 | 2012 | 2013 | 2014 | 2015 |
|---|---|---|---|---|---|---|---|---|---|---|---|
| Championship | | | T3 | 1 | T40 | T45 | T49 | T55 | T47 | | 61 |
| Match Play | | 1 | 2 | R64 | 1 | R32 | R16 | R64 | | | |
| Invitational | T41 | T36 | T51 | T68 | T22 | T22 | T37 | T24 | | | |
| Champions | | | | | T10 | | T56 | T51 | | | |

Win
Top 10
Did not play

QF, R16, R32, R64 = Round in which player lost in match play
"T" = tied
Note that the HSBC Champions did not become a WGC event until 2009.

== PGA Tour career summary ==
| Year | Wins (Majors) | Earnings (US$) | Rank |
|---|---|---|---|
| 2001 | 0 | 525,338 | 95 |
| 2002 | 0 | 957,184 | 64 |
| 2003 | 0 | 1,477,246 | 45 |
| 2004 | 0 | 1,236,910 | 61 |
| 2005 | 1 | 1,931,676 | 33 |
| 2006 | 2 (1) | 4,354,969 | 5 |
| 2007 | 0 | 2,943,203 | 14 |
| 2008 | 1 | 2,880,099 | 15 |
| 2009 | 2 | 3,866,270 | 8 |
| 2010 | 1 | 2,393,045 | 29 |
| 2011 | 0 | 1,916,994 | 43 |
| 2012 | 0 | 1,255,223 | 71 |
| 2013 | 0 | 892,920 | 93 |
| 2014 | 1 | 1,809,632 | 54 |
| 2015 | 0 | 653,925 | 139 |
| 2016 | 0 | 397,595 | 167 |
| 2017 | 0 | 867,249 | 114 |
| 2018 | 0 | 93,947 | 211 |
| Career* | 8 (1) | 30,453,426 | 30 |

* Complete through the 2018 season.

== Team appearances ==
Amateur

- Nomura Cup (representing Australia): 1997
- Bonallack Trophy (representing Asia/Pacific): 1998
- Australian Men's Interstate Teams Matches (representing Victoria): 1995, 1996, 1997

Professional

- Presidents Cup (International Team): 2007, 2009, 2011, 2026 (non-playing captain)

== See also ==
- List of golfers with most PGA Tour wins
- List of men's major championships winning golfers
- 2000 PGA Tour Qualifying School graduates
