= Canadian Junior Golf Association =

- Company type: Registered Canadian Amateur Athletic Association (RCAA)
- Founded: 1993
- Founder: Earl Fritz
- Headquarters: Markham, Ontario, Canada
- Key people: Earl Fritz (Chief Executive Officer); Shayne Dysart (Director of Operations); Ryan Kilpatrick (Manager of Operations)
- Website: CJGA Home Page

The Canadian Junior Golf Association (CJGA) is a national junior golf association based in Ontario. Established in 1993, the CJGA was founded for the purpose of giving junior golfers in Canada the opportunity to develop their competitive skills. The organization runs approximately 100 tournaments in a given season, including regional, provincial, and national championships. The organization selects skilled juniors to represent Canada at a number of international events.

The CJGA is structured as a not-for-profit "registered Canadian amateur athletic association" (RCAAA) with Revenue Canada.

== Competitive Development Program ==
Through its six-stage competitive development program that focuses on tournaments, clinics, international competitions, and mentoring programs with PGA Tour professionals, the CJGA introduces the game to juniors as young as five and offers competitive multi-day events for the more advanced golfer. The CJGA acts as a feeder system to provincial and national competitions, collegiate and university golf, as well as professional and recreational golf.

=== Level 1 ===
The developmental stage of the CJGA program. Juniors between the ages of 5-13 are introduced to the basics of the game of golf through the Junior Linkster program, which include learning proper etiquette and competing in a friendly environment. The clinics serve as tools for juniors hoping to build a foundation for their future golfing endeavors.

=== Level 2 ===
After spending time in the Junior Linkster Program, juniors are presented with the opportunity to participate in multi-day events. The tournaments are more competitive and structured than those on the Junior Linkster series and attempt to instill a higher level of professionalism.

=== Level 3 ===
Juniors who have proven their talents through CJGA Junior Tour events are provided with the opportunity to test their skills in Regional and Provincial events, which take on an added degree of intensity and structure. There is an application policy as well as certain procedures that must be followed for those who wish to participate in these tournaments.

=== Level 4 ===
These events are high profile, with media and sponsor representatives on hand. Applicants for these events are selected based on their performances in other CJGA Junior Tour events held earlier in the season. There is an added amount of pressure on juniors participating in national tournaments because of the status of the events. Both stroke and match play formats are offered in national tournaments conducted by the CJGA.

=== Level 5 ===
CJGA Juniors are given the opportunity to qualify for prestigious international events through various qualifying tourneys that are conducted during the earlier months of the golfing season. Aspiring juniors who earn the chance to represent the CJGA in an international tournament will be able to test their skills against some of the premier junior golfing talent that the rest of the world has to offer and, in many cases, will receive mentoring support from Canada's top touring professional golfers. The CJGA's international selection committee selects teams for various international tournaments based on cumulative results. CJGA Team Canada members will learn the necessary attributes and gain the experiences needed to possibly move on to Canada's national teams.

=== Level 6 ===
The objective of the CJGA Competitive Development Program is to assist junior golfers in their efforts to earn a spot on a golf team at the university level either in Canada or the United States.

== International Success ==
In 2003, CJGA Team Canada captured its first World Junior Golf Cup in Scotland, defeating a tough American contingent. The team was also victorious in 2005, 2006 and 2007, over IJGT Team USA and the Fife Golfing Union. The 2003 victory was followed up with CJGA Team Canada's first North America Cup victory in 2004 at Berkeley Hall Golf Club in Hilton Head, SC and in 2007 at Weston Golf & Country Club in Toronto, Ont.

== PGA Tour Influence ==
USA Professionals such as Stephen Ames and Ian Leggatt assist in junior golf in Canada with the CJGA. In March 2009 Stephen Ames was named as the CJGA's national spokesperson.

=== Stephen Ames Cup ===
In 2005, Stephen Ames worked with the CJGA to create the Stephen Ames Cup, an annual Ryder Cup style tournament that brings together junior golfers from Trinidad & Tobago and Canada. The teams travel to each other's country as they alternate playing host to the tournament. This August (2009) the tournament will be played in Calgary, Alberta.

==== Results ====
Year	Venue	Winning team	Score		Losing team
2009	TBD (Calgary, Alberta)				
2008	St.Andrew's Golf Club (St.Andrew, Trinidad and Tobago)	(Trinidad and Tobago) Trinidad & Tobago	12 1/2	7 1/2	Canada
2007	Granite Golf Club (Stouffville, Ontario)	Canada	13	7	(Trinidad and Tobago) Trinidad & Tobago
2006	St.Andrew's Golf Club (St.Andrew, Trinidad and Tobago)	(Trinidad and Tobago) Trinidad & Tobago	15	5	Canada
2005	Granite Golf Club (Stouffville, Ontario)	Canada	10	6	(Trinidad and Tobago) Trinidad & Tobago

== Partner Organizations ==
The CJGA has partnered with other associations to help assist juniors golfers gain access to the CJGA and help CJGA members who wish to play on other tours.

1. American Junior Golf Association (AJGA)
2. International Junior Golf Tour (IJGT)
3. Washington Jr. Golf Association
4. Junior Linskter Tour Canada (BC) - Harry White
5. Brent Morrison Academy (BC)

== Alumni ==
Alena Sharp, James Lepp, Jessica Shepley, Derek Gillespie, Seema Sadekar, Will Mitchell, Brooke Henderson, and Chris Baryla are a couple of the hundreds of CJGA alumni who have participated in CJGA programs and are currently playing on professional tours such as the PGA Tour, the LPGA Tour, the Canadian Tour and the Futures Tour. Nearly fifty 2008 CJGA graduates are participating as freshman in NCAA competition in 2008–2009.
