= Skins Game (PGA Tour) =

Golf event

The Skins Game is an unofficial-money event on the PGA Tour from 1983 to 2008. It took place in November or December each year after the end of the official PGA Tour season. It was recognized by the PGA Tour but did not count towards the official money list. It was most recently sponsored by LG and was officially known as the LG Skins Game, hosted at the Indian Wells Golf Resort in Indian Wells, California.

The Skins Game differed from most PGA Tour golf tournaments in several ways. Only four golfers were invited to the tournament and the golfers played to win individual holes or "skins" in a match play format. Each hole was assigned a different monetary value and the golfer who won the hole with the best score outright won the money for that hole. In the event that two or more golfers tie (which is called "halving") on a hole, the skin is carried over to the next hole. In the event that two or more golfers halve the final hole, a playoff began until one golfer won a hole outright. (In a playoff that requires more than one playoff hole, if a player is not one of those that halve the playoff hole, he is eliminated—it was not "one tie, all tie".)

Fred Couples was given the nickname of "Mr. Skins" because of his dominance in the Skins Game. He won $4,405,000 and 77 skins in 11 appearances. He won five of the Skins Games overall.

The 2009 Skins Game, originally set for Thanksgiving weekend 2009, was cancelled in May 2009 after LG pulled out of sponsorship; the Associated Press speculated that poor television ratings for the event led to its permanent demise.

In 2018, Jack Whigham and Bryan Zuriff revived the idea, with Zuriff noting that he was a fan of the original Skins Game concept. He retooled it into The Match, which has been held most years on Thanksgiving weekend into the early 2020s before shifting into a mid-December scheduling pattern.

In 2025, TMRW Golf League announced a revival of the Skins Game for November 28 (the day after Thanksgiving) that would be carried live on Amazon Prime Video. It was being produced in conjunction with Jeff Neubarth, who had previously been involved with The Match, and sponsored by Capital One. The 2026 version, which Amazon will make available for free to non-Prime subscribers, is sponsored by Farmers Insurance.

Prize money was awarded as follows in 2008:

Hole	Prize money (per hole)
1–6	$25,000
7–12	$50,000
13–17	$70,000
18^{1}	$200,000

^{1} This is known as a "super skin". The total prize money was exactly $1 million.

Prize money was awarded as follows in 2025:

Hole	Prize money (per hole)
1–5	$100,000
6–9	$200,000
10–13	$300,000
14	$400,000
15	$500,000
16	$600,000

The total prize money was $4 million.

== Rule changes ==
In 2001, the player winning a hole outright had to tie or win the next hole to collect his skins from the previous hole, called "validation". This was very tough to do. Greg Norman was the only one that could back up his win on the previous hole. He won the 17th and tied for low on the 18th hole to collect $800,000, the largest skin collected for one hole. He won the $200,000 in a playoff to win the entire $1 million prize money. This rule was rescinded the following year.

The 2025 revival initially followed an unusual format in which each golfer began with a pot of money that increased if a player won the hole but decreased if he did not; after this format caused confusion, and one golfer (Xander Schauffele) lost his entire pot and went home with no money, the format was abandoned in favor of a more traditional skins format for 2026.

== Milestones ==
- 1983: First Skins Game held at Desert Highlands in Scottsdale, Arizona, with Jack Nicklaus, Tom Watson, Arnold Palmer, and Gary Player as the participants. NBC televises the event throughout the U.S. with Vin Scully as the announcer. The only notable affiliate not to televise the first event was KYW-TV in Philadelphia (now a CBS owned station).
- 1987: Lee Trevino made a hole in one on the par-3 17th hole. Though the event was taped, CBS's Brent Musburger told viewers about the hole in one during a halftime report on The NFL Today.
- 1991: Coverage moved to ABC Sports, after NBC got the rights to Notre Dame football.
- 1996: Tiger Woods makes the first of three straight appearances in the event. He never won the event.
- 2001: Only time the validation system was used (see above). Also, the first (and only) time a player wins all 18 skins.
- 2025: Contest is revived after 17 years, initially under a one-time-only format where players could lose money by not winning a hole.
- 2026: Traditional Skins Game format returns.

== Winners ==
Year	Winner	Country	Winnings	Runner(s)-up
Farmers Insurance Skins Game
2026	Justin Thomas v. Wyndham Clark v. Brooks Koepka v. Jackson Koivun			
Capital One Skins Game
2025	Keegan Bradley	United States	$2,100,000	(England) Tommy Fleetwood
LG Skins Game
2008	K. J. Choi	South Korea	$415,000	(Canada) Stephen Ames
2007	Stephen Ames (2)	Canada	$675,000	(United States) Fred Couples
2006	Stephen Ames	Canada	$590,000	(United States) Fred Couples
Merrill Lynch Skins Game
2005	Fred Funk	United States	$925,000	(United States) Tiger Woods
2004	Fred Couples (5)	United States	$640,000	(United States) Tiger Woods
The ConAgra Foods Skins Game
2003	Fred Couples (4)	United States	$605,000	(Sweden) Annika Sörenstam
Skins Game
2002	Mark O'Meara (2)	United States	$405,000	(United States) Phil Mickelson
2001	Greg Norman	Australia	$1,000,000	(United States) Tiger Woods, (Sweden) Jesper Parnevik, (Scotland) Colin Montgomerie
2000	Colin Montgomerie	Scotland	$415,000	(Fiji) Vijay Singh
1999	Fred Couples (3)	United States	$635,000	(United States) Mark O'Meara
1998	Mark O'Meara	United States	$430,000	(United States) Tom Lehman
1997	Tom Lehman	United States	$300,000	(United States) Mark O'Meara
1996	Fred Couples (2)	United States	$280,000	(United States) Tom Watson
1995	Fred Couples	United States	$270,000	(United States) Corey Pavin
1994	Tom Watson	United States	$210,000	(United States) Fred Couples
1993	Payne Stewart (3)	United States	$280,000	(United States) Fred Couples
1992	Payne Stewart (2)	United States	$220,000	(United States) Fred Couples
1991	Payne Stewart	United States	$260,000	(United States) John Daly
1990	Curtis Strange (2)	United States	$225,000	(Australia) Greg Norman
1989	Curtis Strange	United States	$265,000	(United States) Jack Nicklaus
1988	Raymond Floyd	United States	$290,000	(United States) Jack Nicklaus
1987	Lee Trevino	United States	$310,000	(United States) Jack Nicklaus, (United States) Fuzzy Zoeller
1986	Fuzzy Zoeller (2)	United States	$370,000	(United States) Lee Trevino
1985	Fuzzy Zoeller	United States	$255,000	(United States) Tom Watson
1984	Jack Nicklaus	United States	$240,000	(United States) Tom Watson
1983	Gary Player	South Africa	$170,000	(United States) Arnold Palmer

== See also ==
- Wendy's Champions Skins Game, a Champions Tour event (1988–2011)
- LPGA Skins Game, an LPGA Tour event (1990–2003)
- Telus World Skins Game, Canadian event (1993–2012)
