= 2006 U.S. Open (golf) =

Coordinates: 40.958°N 73.754°W

Tournament information
- Dates: June 15–18, 2006
- Location: Mamaroneck, New York
- Courses: Winged Foot Golf Club; West Course
- Organized by: USGA
- Tours: PGA Tour; European Tour; Japan Golf Tour

Statistics
- Par: 70
- Length: 7,264 yards (6,642 m)
- Field: 156 players, 63 after cut
- Cut: 149 (+9)
- Prize fund: $6,250,000 €4,946,204
- Winner's share: $1,225,000 €969,456

Champion
- (Australia) Geoff Ogilvy
- 285 (+5)

Location in the United States
Location in New York

The 2006 United States Open Championship was the 106th U.S. Open, held June 15–18 at Winged Foot Golf Club West Course in Mamaroneck, New York, a suburb northeast of New York City.

Geoff Ogilvy won his only major title by one stroke in one of the wildest finishes in U.S. Open history. He made clutch pars on the final two holes, including a chip-in on 17. Runners-up Jim Furyk, Colin Montgomerie, and Phil Mickelson all failed to par the 72nd hole. In the final pairing and seeking his third straight major championship, Mickelson double-bogeyed the final hole after hitting driver off the tee and failing to hit the fairway. Montgomerie double-bogeyed the same hole when his approach shot from the fairway ended up short and in the rough, then followed the difficult chip with three putts. Furyk bogeyed the 15th hole and then missed a 5-footer for par at the final hole. Tiger Woods missed the cut in a major as a professional for the first time, in his first major since the death of his father. All players finished over par for the first time in a U.S. Open since 1978. The total purse was $6.25 million with a winner's share of $1.225 million.

== History of the U.S. Open at Winged Foot ==
This was the fifth U.S. Open at Winged Foot and the sixth major championship (1997 PGA Championship won by Davis Love III). Former champions include: Bobby Jones (1929), Billy Casper (1959), Hale Irwin (1974), and Fuzzy Zoeller (1984).

The 1974 edition was known as "The Massacre at Winged Foot," as Irwin won with a seven-over-par 287, and just seven sub-par rounds were recorded over the four days. In the years following World War II, only Julius Boros' 9-over total in high winds in 1963 was a higher winning score. Some thought the difficult set-up in 1974 was in response to Johnny Miller's final round 63 at Oakmont a year earlier.

The U.S. Open returned to Winged Foot fourteen years later in 2020.

== Course layout ==
West Course

Hole	Name	Yards	Par	Hole	Name	Yards	Par
1	Genesis	450	4	10	Pulpit	188	3
2	Elm	453	4	11	Billows	396	4
3	Pinnacle	216	3	12	Cape	640	5
4	Sound View	469	4	13	White Mule	214	3
5	Long Lane	515	5	14	Shamrock	458	4
6	El	321	4	15	Pyramid	416	4
7	Babe-in-the-Woods	162	3	16	Hells Bells	478	4
8	Arena	475	4	17	Well-Well	449	4
9	Meadow	514	4	18	Revelations	450	4
Out		3,575	35	In		3,689	35
Source:				Total		7,264	70

Lengths of the course for previous majors:

- 6,987 yards (6,389 m), par 70 - 1997 PGA Championship
- 6,930 yards (6,340 m), par 70 - 1984 U.S. Open
- 6,961 yards (6,365 m), par 70 - 1974 U.S. Open
- 6,873 yards (6,285 m), par 70 - 1959 U.S. Open
- 6,786 yards (6,205 m), par 72 - 1929 U.S. Open

== Field ==
1. Last 10 U.S. Open Champions

Michael Campbell (8,10,16), Ernie Els (4,8,16), Jim Furyk (9,11,12,16), Retief Goosen (8,9,10,11,16), Lee Janzen, Steve Jones, Tiger Woods (3,4,8,9,11,12,16)

2. Top two finishers in the 2005 U.S. Amateur

Dillon Dougherty (a), Edoardo Molinari (a)

3. Last five Masters Champions

Phil Mickelson (5,9,11,12,16), Mike Weir (16)

4. Last five British Open Champions

Ben Curtis, David Duval, Todd Hamilton

5. Last five PGA Champions

Rich Beem, Shaun Micheel, Vijay Singh (8,9,12,16), David Toms (8,9,11,16)

6. The Players Champion

Stephen Ames (9,11,12,16)

7. The U.S. Senior Open Champion

Allen Doyle

8. Top 15 finishers and ties in the 2005 U.S. Open

K. J. Choi (16), Stewart Cink (16), Tim Clark (9,16), John Cook, Fred Couples (16), Bob Estes, Sergio García (9,10,16), Peter Hedblom, Mark Hensby, Ryuji Imada, Peter Jacobsen, Davis Love III (9,16), Rocco Mediate, Arron Oberholser (16), Corey Pavin, Nick Price

9. Top 30 leaders on the 2005 PGA Tour official money list

Stuart Appleby (11,16), Olin Browne, Bart Bryant (12,16), Mark Calcavecchia, Chad Campbell (11,16), Ben Crane (16), Chris DiMarco (16), Luke Donald (10,16), Fred Funk (16), Lucas Glover (16), Pádraig Harrington (16), Tim Herron (16), Charles Howell III, Brandt Jobe, Justin Leonard, Billy Mayfair, Sean O'Hair, Kenny Perry (16), Ted Purdy, Adam Scott (15,16), Scott Verplank (16)

10. Top 15 on the 2005 European Tour Order of Merit

Thomas Bjørn (16), Ángel Cabrera (16), Nick Dougherty, Niclas Fasth (16), Kenneth Ferrie, David Howell (13,16), Miguel Ángel Jiménez (16), Paul McGinley (16), Colin Montgomerie (16), José María Olazábal (16), Henrik Stenson (16)

11. Top 10 on the PGA Tour official money list, as of May 29

Geoff Ogilvy (16), Rory Sabbatini (16)

12. Winners of multiple PGA Tour events from April 23, 2005, through the 2006 Memorial Tournament

Carl Pettersson

13. Top 2 from the 2006 European Tour Order of Merit, as of May 29

Paul Casey (16)

14. Top 2 on the 2005 Japan Golf Tour official money list, provided they are within the top 75 point leaders of the Official World Golf Rankings at that time

Shingo Katayama (16)

15. Top 2 on the 2005 PGA Tour of Australasia official money list, provided they are within the top 75 point leaders of the Official World Golf Rankings at that time

Nick O'Hern (16)

16. Top 50 on the Official World Golf Rankings list, as of May 30

Robert Allenby, Darren Clarke, Trevor Immelman, Zach Johnson, Tom Lehman, Rod Pampling

17. Special exemptions selected by the USGA

None

Sectional qualifiers

- Japan: Keiichiro Fukabori, Tadahiro Takayama, Toru Taniguchi
- England: Phillip Archer, Richard Green, Maarten Lafeber, Graeme McDowell, Jyoti Randhawa, Jeev Milkha Singh, Graeme Storm, Oliver Wilson
- United States

- Daly City, California: Alex Coe (a,L), Michael Derminio (L), Patrick Nagle (a,L), Taylor Wood (L)
- Littleton, Colorado: Dustin White (L)
- Tampa, Florida: Billy Horschel (a,L), John Koskinen (L), George McNeill (L)
- Roswell, Georgia: Jason Dufner (L), Matt Kuchar, Andy Morse (L), Lee Williams (L)
- Koloa, Hawaii: Tadd Fujikawa (a,L)
- St. Charles, Illinois: Jason Allred (L), Steve Stricker
- Rockville, Maryland: Tommy Armour III, David Berganio Jr., Chad Collins, Joey Sindelar
- St. Louis, Missouri: Jay Delsing, Travis Hurst (L)
- Summit, New Jersey: Andy Bare (L), Mark Brooks, Brad Fritsch (L), Michael Harris (L), Scott Hend, J. J. Henry, Rob Johnson (L), Kent Jones, Greg Kraft, John Mallinger, Chris Nallen, David Oh (L), Tom Pernice Jr., Brett Quigley, Kevin Stadler, Andrew Svoboda (L), Phil Tataurangi, Nicholas Thompson (L)
- Columbus, Ohio: Woody Austin, Craig Barlow, Stephen Gangluff, Mathew Goggin, Nathan Green, Jay Haas, Benjamin Hayes (L), Charley Hoffman, J. B. Holmes, Skip Kendall, Steve Lowery, Ian Poulter, Tag Ridings, John Rollins, Charl Schwartzel, Jeff Sluman, D. J. Trahan, Bo Van Pelt, Camilo Villegas, Duffy Waldorf, Dean Wilson
- Galena, Ohio: Madalitso Muthiya (L), Stephen Woodard (L)
- Creswell, Oregon: Jonathan Moore (a)
- Houston, Texas: Ryan Baca (a,L), Ryan Posey (a,L)

== Round summaries ==
=== First round ===
Thursday, June 15, 2006

Colin Montgomerie shot 69 and was the only player under par in the opening round. Phil Mickelson, the winner of the last two majors, was just one shot behind at even-par. Former U.S. Open champion Jim Furyk was also just one shot back. Tiger Woods shot a six over 76 in his first major since his father's death, his worst start ever in a major.

Place	Player	Score	To par
1	(Scotland) Colin Montgomerie	69	−1
T2	(United States) Jim Furyk	70	E
T2	(England) David Howell	70	E
T2	(Spain) Miguel Ángel Jiménez	70	E
T2	(United States) Phil Mickelson	70	E
T2	(United States) Steve Stricker	70	E
T7	(United States) John Cook	71	+1
T7	(England) Kenneth Ferrie	71	+1
T7	(United States) Fred Funk	71	+1
T7	(Northern Ireland) Graeme McDowell	71	+1
T7	(Australia) Geoff Ogilvy	71	+1
T7	(Fiji) Vijay Singh	71	+1
T7	(Canada) Mike Weir	71	+1

=== Second round ===
Friday, June 16, 2006

Steve Stricker led at a major for the first time since 1998 after a one-under 69, and was the only player under par after 36 holes. One stroke back was Montgomerie, while Woods missed the cut at a major as a professional for the first time, ending his record-tying streak of 39 consecutive cuts made at majors. He shot 76 for the second consecutive day missing the cut by three shots. Mickelson struggled throughout the day for 73, which put him four shots back entering the weekend.

The best rounds of the day belonged to Arron Oberholser and David Duval who both shot 68. It was the first cut Duval had made at a major since the 2002 PGA Championship. Other notable players missing the cut included Sergio García, Retief Goosen, 1997 PGA Championship winner at Winged Foot Davis Love III, and defending U.S. Open champion Michael Campbell. The cut was at 149 (+9) and better, and no amateurs advanced to the weekend.

Place	Player	Score	To par
1	(United States) Steve Stricker	70-69=139	−1
2	(Scotland) Colin Montgomerie	69-71=140	E
T3	(England) Kenneth Ferrie	71-70=141	+1
T3	(Australia) Geoff Ogilvy	71-70=141	+1
T5	(United States) Jim Furyk	70-72=142	+2
T5	(Republic of Ireland) Pádraig Harrington	73-69=142	+2
T7	(United States) Jason Dufner	72-71=143	+3
T7	(Northern Ireland) Graeme McDowell	71-72=143	+3
T7	(United States) Phil Mickelson	70-73=143	+3
T7	(United States) Arron Oberholser	75-68=143	+3

Amateurs: Coe (+10), Horschel (+12), Molinari (+13), Moore (+15), Nagle (+16), Fujikawa (+18), Dougherty (+20), Baca (+21), Posey (+22).

=== Third round ===
Saturday, June 17, 2006

Following a one-under 69 in the third round, Mickelson shared the 54-hole lead with Kenneth Ferrie, who bogeyed the 18th for 71. Ogilvy made two straight bogeys on the back and finished with a 72 that left him one shot back. Stricker led through much of the front nine but ended up at 76, three shots behind. Pádraig Harrington needed a birdie to catch Mickelson on the 18th hole, but barely made contact out of the deep rough, and moved the ball just 15 yards (14 m) into the fairway. Once out of a greenside bunker, he three-putted for a triple bogey seven and a disappointing 74.

Place	Player	Score	To par
T1	(England) Kenneth Ferrie	71-70-71=212	+2
T1	(United States) Phil Mickelson	70-73-69=212	+2
3	(Australia) Geoff Ogilvy	71-70-72=213	+3
T4	(Scotland) Colin Montgomerie	69-71-75=215	+5
T4	(England) Ian Poulter	74-71-70=215	+5
T4	(Fiji) Vijay Singh	71-74-70=215	+5
T4	(United States) Steve Stricker	70-69-76=215	+5
T8	(United States) Jim Furyk	70-72-74=216	+6
T8	(Republic of Ireland) Pádraig Harrington	73-69-74=216	+6
T8	(Canada) Mike Weir	71-74-71=216	+6

=== Final round ===
Sunday, June 18, 2006

In one of the most exciting final rounds in U.S. Open history, Ogilvy survived a brutal final day to win his only major title. He took the lead early and led by two strokes after 7 holes, but lost his lead with four bogeys in seven holes. But Ogilvy finished his round with four pars, highlighted by a 30-foot (9 m) chip shot from the second fringe at the 17th. His tee shot on 18 found the fairway but was in a sand-filled divot, and his approach hit the green's false front and rolled back. He dropped a downhill six-footer for his final stroke as all his competitors collapsed around him. Mickelson and Montgomerie needed pars on the final hole to win, or bogeys to tie with Ogilvy, but they both double-bogeyed to hand Ogilvy a dramatic win. He became the first Australian to win a major since Steve Elkington in the 1995 PGA Championship, and the first to win a U.S. Open in a quarter century, since David Graham in 1981.

Montgomerie holed a 75-foot (23 m) putt for birdie on the 17th hole for a share of the lead and was in the middle of the 18th fairway, 172 yards (157 m) from the hole, in prime position to do no worse than a playoff. After an extended wait and much club deliberation, he finally selected a 7-iron and proceeded to miss the green short and right, into deep rough. His difficult chip left a lengthy downhill par putt, and then three-putted for double bogey. Mickelson was in the right rough on the 16th, then the approach plugged into a greenside bunker and he bogeyed. He was well left of the fairway on the 17th into a trash can, but his slicing recovery shot found the green and he two-putted for par. On the 18th tee, Mickelson needed par to win or a bogey to tie, but could not finish off what would have been his third consecutive major championship victory. Using driver, his tee shot went so far left that it clattered through the trees by a hospitality tent. Still trying for par, he went for the green with his second shot but hit a tree, and the ball advanced just 25 yards (23 m). His third faded into the greenside bunker, buried with a "fried-egg" lie; the fourth shot from the sand to win had no spin and rolled off the other side of the green into the rough. Mickelson's chip for bogey and a Monday playoff with Ogilvy rolled six feet past the hole. He tied Sam Snead for the most second-place finishes by a player who has never won the U.S. Open, with four. Furyk needed par to force a playoff and his tee shot was to the left in the intermediate cut; the hooking approach found a greenside bunker and he missed the five-foot putt to save par. Harrington bogeyed the final three holes and finished two strokes behind. Five different players held the lead at one point on Sunday with 15 different lead changes between them.

Place	Player	Score	To par	Money ($)
1	(Australia) Geoff Ogilvy	71-70-72-72=285	+5	1,225,000
T2	(United States) Jim Furyk	70-72-74-70=286	+6	501,249
T2	(United States) Phil Mickelson	70-73-69-74=286	+6	501,249
T2	(Scotland) Colin Montgomerie	69-71-75-71=286	+6	501,249
5	(Republic of Ireland) Pádraig Harrington	73-69-74-71=287	+7	255,642
T6	(England) Kenneth Ferrie	71-70-71-76=288	+8	183,255
T6	(Australia) Nick O'Hern	75-70-74-69=288	+8	183,255
T6	(Fiji) Vijay Singh	71-74-70-73=288	+8	183,255
T6	(United States) Jeff Sluman	74-73-72-69=288	+8	183,255
T6	(United States) Steve Stricker	70-69-76-73=288	+8	183,255
T6	(Canada) Mike Weir	71-74-71-72=288	+8	183,255

==== Scorecard ====
Final round

Hole	1	2	3	4	5	6	7	8	9	10	11	12	13	14	15	16	17	18
Par	4	4	3	4	5	4	3	4	4	3	4	5	3	4	4	4	4	4
(Australia) Ogilvy	+3	+3	+3	+3	+2	+1	+1	+2	+3	+3	+4	+4	+4	+5	+5	+5	+5	+5
(United States) Furyk	+5	+5	+5	+5	+4	+4	+5	+5	+6	+6	+5	+4	+4	+4	+5	+5	+5	+6
(United States) Mickelson	+2	+2	+2	+1	+2	+2	+3	+3	+4	+4	+3	+3	+4	+3	+3	+4	+4	+6
(Scotland) Montgomerie	+5	+5	+5	+4	+3	+3	+3	+3	+3	+4	+4	+4	+4	+5	+5	+5	+4	+6
(Republic of Ireland) Harrington	+6	+6	+6	+6	+6	+6	+6	+6	+6	+6	+6	+5	+5	+4	+4	+5	+6	+7
(England) Ferrie	+2	+2	+2	+2	+2	+2	+3	+4	+4	+5	+6	+6	+6	+6	+7	+7	+8	+8
(Australia) O'Hern	+8	+8	+8	+8	+8	+7	+6	+5	+6	+7	+7	+7	+8	+8	+8	+7	+7	+8
(Fiji) Singh	+5	+5	+5	+5	+5	+4	+5	+5	+6	+6	+5	+5	+6	+6	+7	+7	+8	+8
(United States) Sluman	+8	+9	+9	+8	+7	+5	+5	+6	+6	+7	+7	+7	+7	+7	+7	+8	+8	+8
(United States) Stricker	+6	+6	+7	+7	+6	+4	+4	+5	+6	+6	+6	+7	+6	+7	+7	+6	+7	+8
(Canada) Weir	+6	+7	+7	+6	+6	+7	+7	+7	+8	+8	+8	+9	+10	+10	+9	+9	+9	+8

Cumulative tournament scores, relative to par

Eagle	Birdie	Bogey	Double bogey

== Quotes ==
"I still am in shock that I did that. I just can't believe that I did that. I am such an idiot." - Phil Mickelson after double bogeying the 18th hole.

"The biggest reason why this is so disappointing is that this is a tournament that I dreamt of winning as a kid. I spent hours practicing, countless hours practicing, dreaming of winning this tournament. I came out here months in advance to get ready and had it right there in my hand, man. It was right there and I let it go." - Phil Mickelson on losing the U.S. Open.

"I think I was the beneficiary of a little bit of charity." - Geoff Ogilvy after watching from the club house as Furyk, Mickelson and Montgomerie all couldn't make par on the 18th hole.

"I'm disappointed. I played my heart out and it didn't work." - Jim Furyk after runner up finish.

"I love this game." - Geoff Ogilvy after putting out on the 18th hole

"I switched from a 6 to a 7. I thought adrenaline would kick in. I usually hit the ball 10 yards further in that circumstance. I caught it slightly heavy and it went slightly right. It was a poor shot, no question about that, and I put myself into poor position." - Colin Montgomerie on club selection on final hole.
