= 2006 WGC-Accenture Match Play Championship =

Coordinates: 33°05′32.16″N 117°16′01.33″W

Tournament information
- Dates: February 22–26, 2006
- Location: Carlsbad, California
- Course(s): La Costa Resort and Spa
- Tour(s): PGA Tour; European Tour

Statistics
- Par: 72
- Length: 7,277
- Field: 64 players
- Prize fund: $7,500,000
- Winner's share: $1,300,000

Champion
- (Australia) Geoff Ogilvy
- def. Davis Love III 3 & 2

The 2006 WGC-Accenture Match Play Championship was a golf tournament that was played from February 22–26, 2006 at La Costa Resort and Spa in Carlsbad, California. It was the eighth WGC-Accenture Match Play Championship and the first of four World Golf Championships events held in 2006. It was the final time the event would be hosted at La Costa.

Geoff Ogilvy, the 12th seed, won his first World Golf Championships event by defeating Davis Love III 3 and 2 in the 36 hole final. He set a record by playing a total of 129 holes during the tournament, the most by anyone in the eight-year history of the event, which included four consecutive overtime matches at the start of the week. The total prize fund for the championship was $7.5 million, of which Ogilvy's share was $1.3 million.

Tiger Woods set the record for largest victory margin with a 9 and 8 win over Stephen Ames in the first round. Some interpreted Woods' performance as payback for Ames' comments earlier in the week in which he told the Associated Press, "anything can happen, especially where he's hitting it."

== Brackets ==
The Championship was a single elimination match play event. The field consisted of the top 64 players available from the Official World Golf Rankings, seeded according to the rankings. Number 6 Sergio García and number 28 Thomas Bjørn did not play opening spots for number 65 Graeme McDowell and number 67 Stephen Ames (number 66 Craig Parry did not enter).

=== Bobby Jones bracket ===
First round February 22
1	(United States) Tiger Woods	9&8
16	(Canada) Stephen Ames
8	(Australia) Robert Allenby	3&2
9	(South Korea) K. J. Choi
5	(United States) Chad Campbell	4&2
12	(United States) Tim Herron
4	(Sweden) Henrik Stenson	1up
13	(England) Paul Casey
6	(Australia) Stuart Appleby
11	(United States) Tom Lehman	3&2
3	(Australia) Adam Scott	2&1
14	(United States) Lucas Glover
7	(Spain) José M. Olazábal	3&2
10	(United States) Brandt Jobe
2	(United States) David Toms	19h
15	(England) Ian Poulter

Second round February 23
1	(United States) Tiger Woods	1up
8	(Australia) Robert Allenby
5	(United States) Chad Campbell	1up
4	(Sweden) Henrik Stenson
11	(United States) Tom Lehman	1up
3	(Australia) Adam Scott
7	(Spain) José M. Olazábal
2	(United States) David Toms	2&1

Third round February 23
1	(United States) Tiger Woods
5	(United States) Chad Campbell	1up
11	(United States) Tom Lehman	4&3
2	(United States) David Toms

Fourth round February 24
5	(United States) Chad Campbell
11	(United States) Tom Lehman	1up

=== Ben Hogan bracket ===
First round February 22
1	(South Africa) Ernie Els
16	(Germany) Bernhard Langer	1up
8	(United States) Stewart Cink
9	(Canada) Mike Weir	4&3
5	(Australia) Nick O'Hern	4&3
12	(United States) Fred Funk
4	(New Zealand) Michael Campbell
13	(Australia) Geoff Ogilvy	1up
6	(United States) Scott Verplank	26h
11	(England) Lee Westwood
3	(England) David Howell	22h
14	(Australia) Steve Elkington
7	(United States) Bart Bryant
10	(United States) John Daly	4&2
2	(United States) Phil Mickelson	2up
15	(United States) Charles Howell III

Second round February 23
16	(Germany) Bernhard Langer
9	(Canada) Mike Weir	1up
5	(Australia) Nick O'Hern
13	(Australia) Geoff Ogilvy	21h
6	(United States) Scott Verplank
3	(England) David Howell	3&2
10	(United States) John Daly
2	(United States) Phil Mickelson	2&1

Third round February 23
9	(Canada) Mike Weir
13	(Australia) Geoff Ogilvy	1up
2	(United States) Phil Mickelson
3	(England) David Howell	3&1

Fourth round February 24
13	(Australia) Geoff Ogilvy	19h
3	(England) David Howell

=== Gary Player bracket ===
First round February 22
1	(Fiji) Vijay Singh	5&4
16	(Northern Ireland) Graeme McDowell
8	(South Africa) Rory Sabbatini
9	(Spain) Miguel Á. Jiménez	2&1
5	(Republic of Ireland) Pádraig Harrington	4&2
12	(Australia) Rod Pampling
4	(Argentina) Ángel Cabrera	1up
13	(Australia) Peter Lonard
6	(United States) Davis Love III	2&1
11	(Australia) Mark Hensby
3	(United States) Kenny Perry
14	(Sweden) Carl Pettersson	1up
7	(South Africa) Tim Clark
10	(United States) Arron Oberholser	1up
2	(United States) Chris DiMarco	2&1
15	(United States) Mark Calcavecchia

Second round February 23
1	(Fiji) Vijay Singh	2&1
9	(Spain) Miguel Á. Jiménez
5	(Republic of Ireland) Pádraig Harrington	1up
4	(Argentina) Ángel Cabrera
6	(United States) Davis Love III	1up
14	(Sweden) Carl Pettersson
10	(United States) Arron Oberholser
2	(United States) Chris DiMarco	6&5

Third round February 23
1	(Fiji) Vijay Singh
5	(Republic of Ireland) Pádraig Harrington	1up
6	(United States) Davis Love III	3&2
2	(United States) Chris DiMarco

Fourth round February 24
5	(Republic of Ireland) Pádraig Harrington
6	(United States) Davis Love III	1up

=== Sam Snead bracket ===
First round February 22
1	(South Africa) Retief Goosen	5&4
16	(England) Paul Broadhurst
8	(United States) Justin Leonard
9	(United States) Ben Crane	4&3
5	(Northern Ireland) Darren Clarke
12	(Japan) Shigeki Maruyama	4&3
4	(England) Luke Donald	2&1
13	(Australia) Richard Green
6	(Republic of Ireland) Paul McGinley
11	(Japan) Shingo Katayama	2&1
3	(Scotland) Colin Montgomerie	23h
14	(Sweden) Niclas Fasth
7	(United States) Fred Couples
10	(United States) Sean O'Hair	1up
2	(United States) Jim Furyk
15	(United States) Zach Johnson	1up

Second round February 23
1	(South Africa) Retief Goosen	2&1
9	(United States) Ben Crane
12	(Japan) Shigeki Maruyama
4	(England) Luke Donald	4&3
11	(Japan) Shingo Katayama	3&2
3	(Scotland) Colin Montgomerie
10	(United States) Sean O'Hair
15	(United States) Zach Johnson	1up

Third round February 23
1	(South Africa) Retief Goosen	1up
4	(England) Luke Donald
11	(Japan) Shingo Katayama
15	(United States) Zach Johnson	4&3

Fourth round February 24
1	(South Africa) Retief Goosen
15	(United States) Zach Johnson	3&2

=== Final Four ===
Semi-finals; February 25
11	(United States) Tom Lehman
13	(Australia) Geoff Ogilvy	4&3
6	(United States) Davis Love III	4&2
15	(United States) Zach Johnson

Finals; February 26
13	(Australia) Geoff Ogilvy	3&2
6	(United States) Davis Love III
Third place
11	(United States) Tom Lehman
15	(United States) Zach Johnson	1up

== Prize money breakdown ==
Place	US ($)
Champion	1,300,000
Runner-up	750,000
Third place	560,000
Fourth place	450,000
Losing quarter-finalists x 4	240,000
Losing third round x 8	125,000
Losing second round x 16	85,000
Losing first round x 32	35,000
Total	$7,500,000
