= Stephen Ames =

Canadian professional golfer (born 1964)

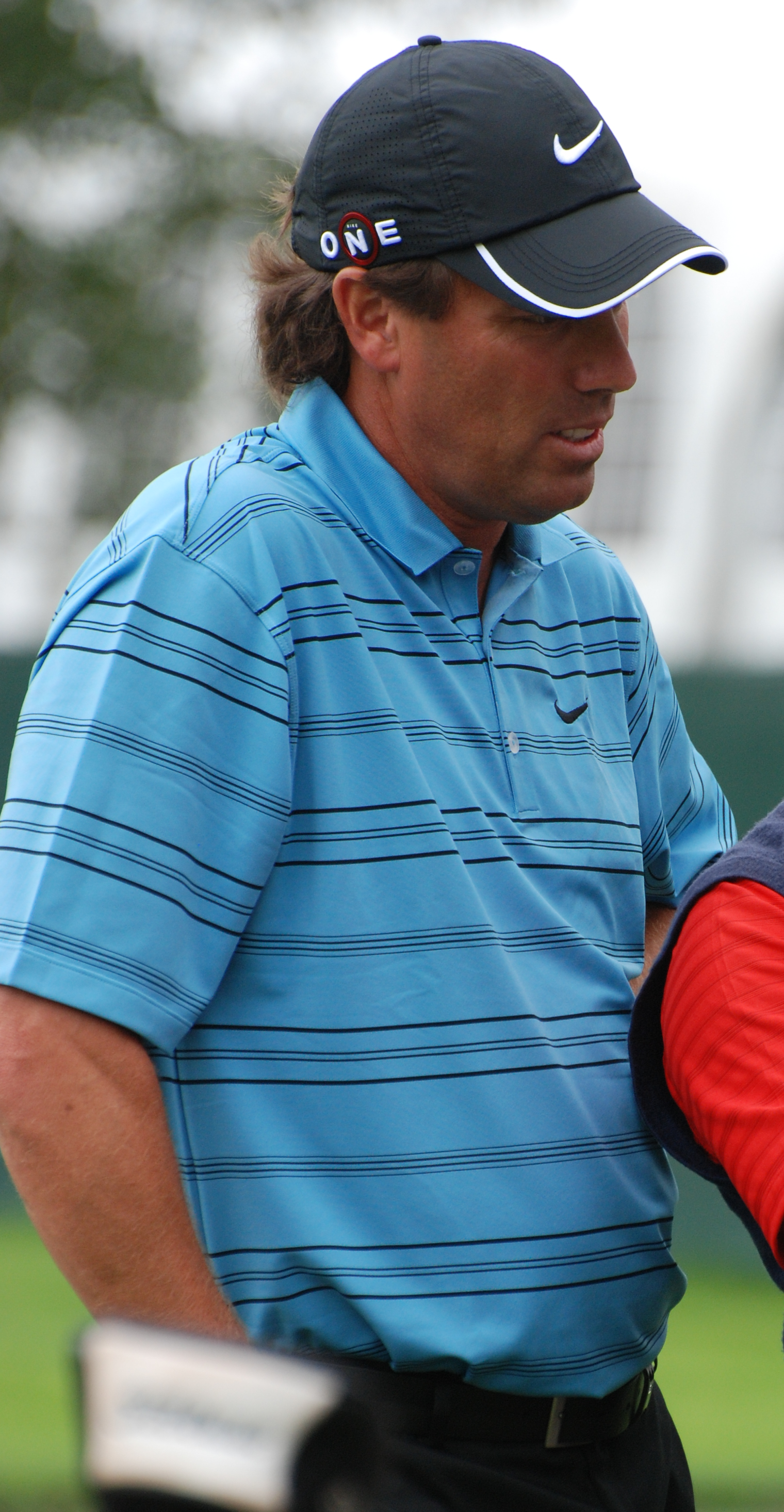
- Ames at the 2009 U.S. Open

Personal information
- Full name: Stephen Michael Ames
- Nationality: Trinidad and Tobago (until Sep 2005); Canada (since Oct 2005)
- Born: April 28, 1964 (age 62) San Fernando, Trinidad and Tobago
- Height: 6 ft 1 in (185 cm)
- Weight: 185 lb (84 kg; 13.2 st)
- Spouses: Jodi Ames (m. 1991; div. 2016) Kelly Norcott (m. 2018)
- Children: 2

Career
- Sport: Golf
- College: College of Boca Raton
- Turned professional: 1987
- Current tour: PGA Tour Champions
- Former tours: PGA Tour; European Tour
- Professional wins: 20
- Highest ranking: 17 (4 July 2004)

Number of wins by tour
- PGA Tour: 4
- European Tour: 2
- Korn Ferry Tour: 1
- PGA Tour Champions: 9
- Other: 4

Best results in major championships
- Masters Tournament: T11: 2006
- PGA Championship: T9: 2004
- U.S. Open: T9: 2004
- The Open Championship: T5: 1997

Achievements and awards
- Chaconia Medal (Gold): 2004
- Canadian Golf Hall of Fame: 2014

Stephen Michael Ames (born April 28, 1964) is a professional golfer formerly of the PGA Tour, who now plays on the PGA Tour Champions. The biggest win of his career was at The Players Championship in 2006. He holds dual citizenship of Trinidad and Tobago and Canada.

== Early life ==
Ames was born in San Fernando, Trinidad and Tobago and is of English and Portuguese descent, and much of his family resides in the Caribbean nation. His grandmother was Trinidad and Tobago Champion twice. Ames grew up on the Petrotrin employee compound (Then known as Trintoc) in Pointe-à-Pierre. He learned to play golf at Petrotrin's staff club, Pointe-à-Pierre Golf Club.

Ames' golfing talent developed early in life, assisted by support and discipline from his father, Michael. In his Hoerman Cup debut at the age of 16 in 1980, he set the course record at Sandy Lane, Barbados with a six-under-par total of 66.

== Professional career ==
Ames won a golf scholarship at the College of Boca Raton in Florida in the United States and turned professional in 1987, but failed to win a PGA Tour card over the following few years, partly due to a neck injury. He won his first professional tournament in the United States (the Ben Hogan Pensacola Open) in 1991 on what was then the Ben Hogan Tour.

In 1992, Ames tried his luck at European Tour Qualifying School and was successful. He spent five seasons on the European Tour and performed consistently, making the top 80 on the Order of Merit each time, with a best of 13th in 1996. He won the 1994 Open V33 Grand Lyon in France and the 1996 Benson & Hedges International Open in England.

In 1997, Ames finished third at the PGA Tour Qualifying Tournament to earn exempt status for the 1998 season. Due to visa difficulties, Ames was unable to play the PGA Tour in 1999 for nearly six months.

In his first six seasons he didn't break into the top 40 of the money list. He highest finish was runner-up to Craig Perks at the 2002 The Players Championship. In 2004 Ames won for the first time on the PGA Tour at the Cialis Western Open among a field that included many of the best professionals in the world, including Tiger Woods, Vijay Singh and Davis Love III. Later that year, he reached the top 20 in the Official World Golf Ranking.

In 2005, Ames initiated an international Ryder Cup style competition entitled the Stephen Ames Cup. The event pits CJGA Team Canada against Team Trinidad & Tobago. He co-hosts, with MP Jim Prentice, an annual charity golf tournament for kids and owns a steakhouse in Calgary called the Vintage Chophouse.

In February 2006, after provoking world No. 1 Tiger Woods with the comment: "Anything can happen, especially where [Tiger's] hitting the ball," Ames was soundly defeated by Woods at the 2006 WGC-Accenture Match Play Championship at La Costa, losing 9 and 8; the largest amount a player can possibly lose by in an eighteen-hole match play event is 10 and 8. However, on March 26, Ames overcame the record defeat by taking The Players Championship at the TPC at Sawgrass. Playing against 48 of the top 50 golfers in the world (including Woods), Ames emerged victorious, with a record-equaling six stroke margin over World No. 3 Retief Goosen, becoming the second-oldest champion in championship history. With the win, Ames surpassed the US$10 million career earnings barrier and climbed 37 places to 27th in the Official World Golf Ranking.

At the 2007 PGA Championship, Ames was in the final pairing with Tiger Woods in the final round but put himself out of contention after shooting a 76, finishing T-12. In November 2007, he picked up his third PGA Tour victory at the Children's Miracle Network Classic. He has featured in the top 25 of the Official World Golf Rankings.

Ames won for the fourth time on the PGA Tour in 2009, again at the Children's Miracle Network Classic, shooting a final round -8 64. He won in a three-way playoff over George McNeill and Justin Leonard.

Ames was inducted into the Canadian Golf Hall of Fame in August 2014.

On April 16, 2017, Ames secured his first PGA Tour Champions victory, in his 49th start, at the Mitsubishi Electric Classic. He shot a 66 in the final round to finish four strokes ahead of Bernhard Langer. He is the third Canadian to win on the tour and the 11th golfer to win on the three main tours run by the PGA Tour: PGA Tour, PGA Tour Champions, and Web.com Tour.

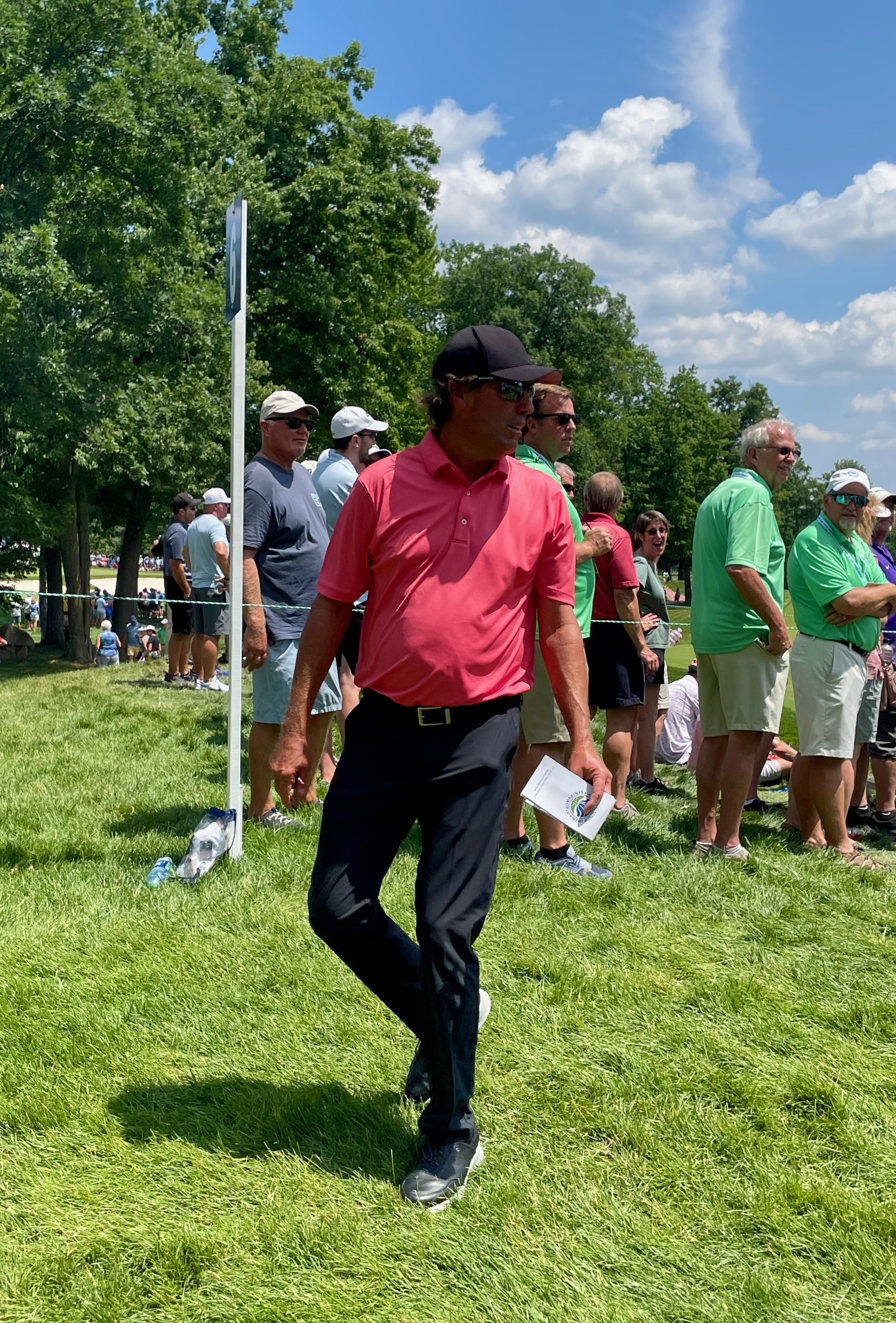
Ames at the 2023 U.S. Senior Open

In June 2021, Ames came from behind and won his second PGA Tour Champions event at the Principal Charity Classic. He won four events on the 2023 PGA Tour Champions season.

== Personal life ==
In 2003, his Canadian wife was a former air hostess and he took Canadian citizenship. They have two sons.

Ames moved from Calgary to Vancouver in 2014 after separating from his wife.

== Awards and honors ==
- In 2004, Ames was awarded the Chaconia Medal (Gold), Trinidad & Tobago's second highest honour
- In 2006, Ames was awarded the Trinidad and Tobago First Citizens Sports Foundation Sportsman of the Year Award.

== Professional wins (20) ==
=== PGA Tour wins (4) ===
Legend
Players Championships (1)
Other PGA Tour (3)

| No. | Date | Tournament | Winning score | Margin of victory | Runner(s)-up |
|---|---|---|---|---|---|
| 1 | Jul 4, 2004 | Cialis Western Open | −10 (67-73-64-70=274) | 2 strokes | (United States) Steve Lowery |
| 2 | Mar 26, 2006 | The Players Championship | −14 (71-66-70-67=274) | 6 strokes | (South Africa) Retief Goosen |
| 3 | Nov 4, 2007 | Children's Miracle Network Classic | −17 (70-63-70-68=271) | 1 stroke | (South Africa) Tim Clark |
| 4 | Nov 15, 2009 | Children's Miracle Network Classic (2) | −18 (69-70-71-64=270) | Playoff | (United States) Justin Leonard, (United States) George McNeill |

PGA Tour playoff record (1–0)

| No. | Year | Tournament | Opponents | Result |
|---|---|---|---|---|
| 1 | 2009 | Children's Miracle Network Classic | (United States) Justin Leonard, (United States) George McNeill | Won with par on second extra hole Leonard eliminated by par on first hole |

=== European Tour wins (2) ===
| No. | Date | Tournament | Winning score | Margin of victory | Runner(s)-up |
|---|---|---|---|---|---|
| 1 | Apr 4, 1994 | Open V33 Grand Lyon | −6 (70-67-71-74=282) | 2 strokes | (Sweden) Gabriel Hjertstedt, (Spain) Pedro Linhart |
| 2 | May 19, 1996 | Benson & Hedges International Open | −5 (73-71-67-72=283) | 1 stroke | (England) Jon Robson |

=== Ben Hogan Tour wins (1) ===
| No. | Date | Tournament | Winning score | Margin of victory | Runner-up |
|---|---|---|---|---|---|
| 1 | Apr 21, 1991 | Ben Hogan Pensacola Open | −12 (69-68-67=204) | 1 stroke | (United States) Jerry Foltz |

=== Other wins (4) ===
- 1989 Trinidad and Tobago Open
- 2005 Telus Skins Game
- 2006 LG Skins Game
- 2007 LG Skins Game

=== PGA Tour Champions wins (9) ===
| No. | Date | Tournament | Winning score | Margin of victory | Runner(s)-up |
|---|---|---|---|---|---|
| 1 | Apr 16, 2017 | Mitsubishi Electric Classic | −15 (67-68-66=201) | 4 strokes | (Germany) Bernhard Langer |
| 2 | Jun 5, 2021 | Principal Charity Classic | −15 (68-69-67=204) | 1 stroke | (Canada) Mike Weir |
| 3 | Feb 11, 2023 | Trophy Hassan II | −9 (67-70-73=210) | 5 strokes | (Australia) Mark Hensby |
| 4 | May 7, 2023 | Mitsubishi Electric Classic (2) | −19 (65-64-68=197) | 4 strokes | (Spain) Miguel Ángel Jiménez |
| 5 | Jun 4, 2023 | Principal Charity Classic (2) | −17 (66-66-67=199) | 1 stroke | (United States) Jerry Kelly, (United States) Steve Stricker |
| 6 | Aug 13, 2023 | Boeing Classic | −19 (67-67-63=197) | 7 strokes | (Spain) Miguel Ángel Jiménez |
| 7 | Feb 18, 2024 | Chubb Classic | −13 (67-64=131) (Note: Shortened to 36 holes due to weather.) | 3 strokes | (United States) Rocco Mediate |
| 8 | Apr 28, 2024 | Mitsubishi Electric Classic (3) | −14 (71-64-67=202) | 4 strokes | (United States) Doug Barron, (England) Paul Broadhurst |
| 9 | Aug 11, 2024 | Boeing Classic (2) | −11 (71-67-67=205) | 1 stroke | (New Zealand) Steven Alker, (South Africa) Ernie Els, (Sweden) Robert Karlsson |

== Results in major championships ==
| Tournament | 1993 | 1994 | 1995 | 1996 | 1997 | 1998 | 1999 |
|---|---|---|---|---|---|---|---|
| Masters Tournament | | | | | | | |
| U.S. Open | | | | | T68 | | |
| The Open Championship | T51 | | | T56 | T5 | T24 | |
| PGA Championship | | | | | | | |

| Tournament | 2000 | 2001 | 2002 | 2003 | 2004 | 2005 | 2006 | 2007 | 2008 | 2009 |
|---|---|---|---|---|---|---|---|---|---|---|
| Masters Tournament | | | | | | T45 | T11 | T24 | T25 | T20 |
| U.S. Open | | | CUT | | T9 | T71 | CUT | T10 | T58 | T10 |
| The Open Championship | | | T69 | | CUT | CUT | T41 | CUT | T7 | CUT |
| PGA Championship | T30 | | WD | CUT | T9 | T72 | T55 | T12 | CUT | T24 |

| Tournament | 2010 | 2011 | 2012 |
|---|---|---|---|
| Masters Tournament | | | |
| U.S. Open | CUT | | T68 |
| The Open Championship | | | CUT |
| PGA Championship | CUT | | |

Top 10
Did not play

WD = Withdrew
CUT = missed the halfway cut
"T" indicates a tie for a place.

=== Summary ===
| Tournament | Wins | 2nd | 3rd | Top-5 | Top-10 | Top-25 | Events | Cuts made |
|---|---|---|---|---|---|---|---|---|
| Masters Tournament | 0 | 0 | 0 | 0 | 0 | 4 | 5 | 5 |
| U.S. Open | 0 | 0 | 0 | 0 | 3 | 3 | 10 | 7 |
| The Open Championship | 0 | 0 | 0 | 1 | 2 | 3 | 12 | 7 |
| PGA Championship | 0 | 0 | 0 | 0 | 1 | 3 | 10 | 6 |
| Totals | 0 | 0 | 0 | 1 | 6 | 13 | 37 | 25 |

- Most consecutive cuts made – 6 (1993 Open Championship – 2000 PGA)
- Longest streak of top-10s – 1 (six times)

== The Players Championship ==
=== Wins (1) ===
| Year | Championship | 54 holes | Winning score | Margin | Runner-up |
|---|---|---|---|---|---|
| 2006 | The Players Championship | 1 shot lead | −14 (71-66-70-67=274) | 6 strokes | (South Africa) Retief Goosen |

=== Results timeline ===
| Tournament | 1998 | 1999 | 2000 | 2001 | 2002 | 2003 | 2004 | 2005 | 2006 | 2007 | 2008 | 2009 | 2010 | 2011 |
|---|---|---|---|---|---|---|---|---|---|---|---|---|---|---|
| The Players Championship | CUT | | T42 | CUT | 2 | T17 | T13 | CUT | 1 | CUT | 5 | T49 | T58 | CUT |

Win
Top 10
Did not play

CUT = missed the halfway cut
"T" indicates a tie for a place.

== Results in World Golf Championships ==
| Tournament | 2004 | 2005 | 2006 | 2007 | 2008 | 2009 | 2010 |
|---|---|---|---|---|---|---|---|
| Match Play | | R64 | R64 | QF | R64 | R32 | R64 |
| Championship | T36 | 10 | WD | T28 | T15 | T40 | |
| Invitational | T22 | T36 | T18 | T22 | T48 | | |
| Champions | | | | | | | |

Top 10
Did not play

WD = withdrew
QF, R16, R32, R64 = Round in which player lost in match play
"T" = tied
Note that the HSBC Champions did not become a WGC event until 2009.

== Results in senior major championships ==
Results not in chronological order

| Tournament | 2014 | 2015 | 2016 | 2017 | 2018 | 2019 | 2020 | 2021 | 2022 | 2023 | 2024 | 2025 | 2026 |
|---|---|---|---|---|---|---|---|---|---|---|---|---|---|
| Senior PGA Championship | T15 | | T44 | T21 | T38 | T35 | NT | T34 | 2 | T15 | T29 | WD | CUT |
| The Tradition | | | T35 | T17 | T34 | T22 | NT | T10 | T45 | T11 | 13 | T5 | T11 |
| U.S. Senior Open | | T38 | T24 | T7 | T31 | T6 | NT | T8 | CUT | T51 | T8 | CUT | T44 |
| Senior Players Championship | | | | T9 | T32 | T39 | T48 | T20 | T5 | T16 | T26 | T40 | T14 |
| Senior British Open Championship | | T22 | T18 | | T3 | T29 | NT | | T20 | | 4 | T31 | CUT |

Top 10
Did not play

CUT = missed the halfway cut
WD = withdrew
"T" indicates a tie for a place
NT = no tournament due to COVID-19 pandemic

== PGA Tour career summary ==
| Season | Wins | Earnings ($) | Rank |
|---|---|---|---|
| 1998 | 0 | 357,869 | 83 |
| 1999 | 0 | 460,760 | 84 |
| 2000 | 0 | 747,312 | 63 |
| 2001 | 0 | 574,451 | 89 |
| 2002 | 0 | 1,278,037 | 46 |
| 2003 | 0 | 1,005,959 | 72 |
| 2004 | 1 | 3,303,205 | 19 |
| 2005 | 0 | 959,665 | 51 |
| 2006 | 1 | 2,395,155 | 43 |
| 2007 | 1 | 2,103,426 | 33 |
| 2008 | 0 | 2,285,707 | 27 |
| 2009 | 1 | 2,131,538 | 37 |
| 2010 | 0 | 916,527 | 107 |
| 2011 | 0 | 547,589 | 139 |
| 2012 | 0 | 193,686 | 187 |
| 2013 | 0 | 188,987 | 185 |
| 2014 | 0 | 141,143 | 194 |
| 2015 | 0 | 7,613 | 253 |
| Career* | 4 | 19,718,160 | 55 |

=== Summary of PGA Tour performances ===
- Starts – 394
- Cuts made – 254
- Wins – 4
- 2nd place finishes – 1
- Top 3 finishes – 5
- Top 10 finishes – 58
- Top 25 finishes – 125

* Complete through the 2014–15 season.

== Team appearances ==
Amateur

- Eisenhower Trophy (representing Trinidad and Tobago): 1986

Professional

- WGC-World Cup (representing Trinidad and Tobago): 2000, 2002, 2003, 2006

== See also ==
- 1997 PGA Tour Qualifying School graduates
