= Sean O'Hair =

American professional golfer (born 1982)

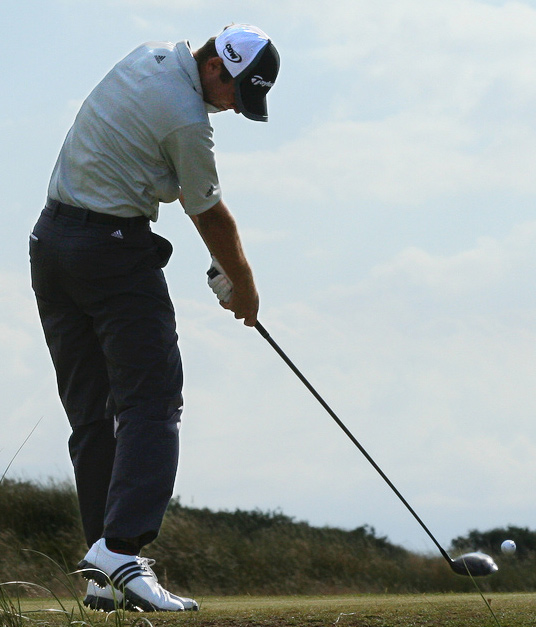

Personal information
- Full name: Sean M. O'Hair
- Nationality: United States
- Born: July 11, 1982 (age 44) Lubbock, Texas, U.S.
- Height: 6 ft 2 in (1.88 m)
- Weight: 165 lb (75 kg; 11.8 st)

Career
- Sport: Golf
- Turned professional: 1999
- Current tours: PGA Tour (past champion status)
- Professional wins: 9
- Highest ranking: 12 (May 3, 2009)

Number of wins by tour
- PGA Tour: 4
- Other: 5

Best results in major championships
- Masters Tournament: T10: 2009
- PGA Championship: T12: 2006
- U.S. Open: T12: 2010
- The Open Championship: T7: 2010

Achievements and awards
- PGA Tour Rookie of the Year: 2005

Sean M. O'Hair (born July 11, 1982) is an American professional golfer who plays on the PGA Tour.

== Early life ==
O'Hair was born in Lubbock, Texas. Rather than play college golf, O'Hair turned professional in 1999 after his junior year at high school at Brophy College Preparatory in Phoenix, Arizona, under the direction of his father, Marc O'Hair, who sold his share of the family shutter business in Lubbock for $2.75 million to develop Sean into a touring pro. The elder O'Hair moved the family to Florida and enrolled Sean in the David Leadbetter Golf Academy.

A featured article by Steve Elling in the January 21, 2005 Golf World alleged:

Marc O'Hair, 52, signed management contracts with his son, says he invested $2 million in his boy's professional future and subjected Sean to a physical and psychological regimen that would make most drill sergeants blush. Sean broke free in 2002 and has not spoken to his father since a perfunctory greeting at Sean's wedding more than two years ago.

== Professional career ==
O'Hair entered PGA Tour Qualifying school regularly from 1999, but was unsuccessful at his first five attempts. He played on various developmental tours: the PGA Tour's Nationwide Tour, the next-level Gateway Tour, and the Cleveland Golf Pro Tour. He had limited success, making the cut in only four out of 18 starts at Nationwide Tour level.

In 2004, O'Hair made it through all three stages of PGA Tour Qualifying School. His 2005 season was a dramatic success. He won his maiden PGA Tour event at the John Deere Classic and finished second at the EDS Byron Nelson Championship. He made 24 of 28 cuts for the season and finished with earnings of $2,461,482. He also won PGA Tour Rookie of the Year honors of the 2005 season. After he established himself as the front-runner for Rookie of the Year distinction with his strong finish at the EDS Byron Nelson Championship and victory at the John Deere Classic, his estranged relationship with his father, already highlighted on a 2002 episode of 60 Minutes, became well-publicized. It was also profiled by Sports Illustrated's Rick Reilly.

In March 2006, O'Hair was the youngest man in the top 50 of the Official World Golf Rankings but his 2006 season was less successful. O'Hair made 20 of 30 cuts and only made half the amount of prize money he had earned in his maiden year on tour. He dropped out of the top 50—finishing no higher than fourth at the Buick Open in Michigan—but returned to the list with a third place at the Canadian Open. He did however produce some solid play at the major championships, finishing in the top-15 at The Open Championship and the PGA Championship. He also finished at +13, tied for 26th, at the 2006 U.S. Open at Winged Foot.

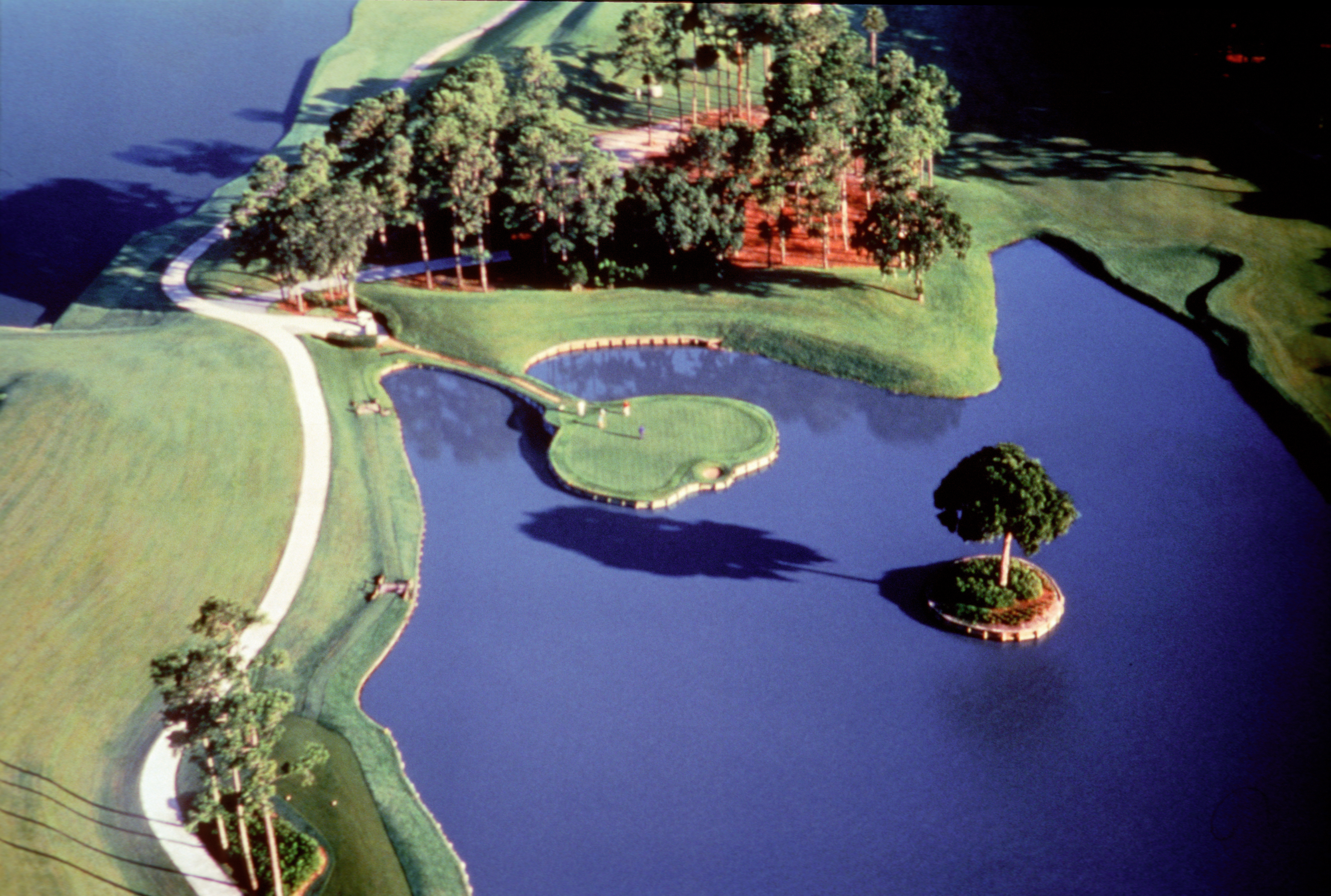
The "Island Green" 17th hole at the at TPC Sawgrass. The teeing ground is off the bottom of the picture.

In 2007, caddied by his father-in-law Steve Lucas, O'Hair recorded his first top-10 of the year, a tie for seventh, at the Verizon Heritage. His second-round 66 matched his low round for the season. The seventh place was his best finish on the PGA Tour since the 2006 Canadian Open.

On May 12, 2007, at The Players Championship at the TPC at Sawgrass, O'Hair led Phil Mickelson by a stroke after the 3rd round. A birdie two on the "Island Green" 17th hole after he had feared he had flown the green with a 9-iron, and a birdie-birdie-birdie finish for a round of 66, gave him a 9-under-par 207 after 54 holes. In the final round O'Hair, playing in the final pairing with Mickelson, was in second place when they came to the 17th, trailing by two strokes. Mickelson played safely to the center of the multi-tiered green but O'Hair, in an effort to cut into the lead with birdie, elected to go for the pin and hit his tee shot over the back of the green into the water hazard. His third shot, from the drop area, also ended up in the water and he finished the hole with a quadruple bogey seven. O'Hair went on to bogey the 18th, dropping him from second to 11th place, which cost O'Hair approximately $747,000 in prize money. O'Hair did not have any more notable results until the fall season series of events where he recorded consecutive top-5 finishes at the Fry's Electronics Open and the Ginn sur Mer Classic. O'Hair ended the year 58th on the FedEx Cup list.

On March 9, 2008, O'Hair came from three strokes back (behind Stewart Cink) to win the PODS Championship by two strokes from six other players at Innisbrook with a final score of 4-under-par. The following week, O'Hair finished in a tie for 3rd at the Arnold Palmer Invitational at Bay Hill. He shot a 63 in the third round to shoot up the leaderboard, but on the final day he finished three back of the champion Tiger Woods. O'Hair made just over $2million on the season and finished 75th in the FedEx Cup standings.

O'Hair started the 2009 season well with a fourth-place finish at the season opening Mercedes-Benz Championship and then a couple months later had a top-10 finish at the AT&T Pebble Beach National Pro-Am. O'Hair then had his best showing at the WGC-Accenture Match Play Championship where he reached the quarter final stages, beating Adam Scott and Ian Poulter along the way, before losing to eventual finalist Paul Casey 4&3. At the Arnold Palmer Invitational, O'Hair entered the final round with a five stroke lead but lost by one stroke to Tiger Woods as Woods birdied the 72nd hole to win the tournament for the second year in a row. This was also the second year in a row that O'Hair was in contention having finished tied for third the previous season.

On May 3, 2009, after starting the final round three strokes behind Zach Johnson, O'Hair won the Quail Hollow Championship by one stroke over Lucas Glover and Bubba Watson. O'Hair survived two late bogies during his final round of 69 to claim his third PGA Tour victory.

After his win at Quail Hollow, O'Hair had a quiet spell during the middle of season but returned to form at the right time when the FedEx Cup playoffs came around. After missing the cut in the first playoff event, The Barclays, he then produced a top-10 finish in the next event, the Deutsche Bank Championship. This was followed by a fourth-place finish at the BMW Championship, the third playoff event, which earned him a place in the season finale The Tour Championship. At East Lake, O'Hair finished alone in third place, to earn over $500,000 and finish the year ranked 5th in the FedEx Cup standings. He also finished the season ranked sixth on the money list and had reached the top 15 of the Official World Golf Rankings for the first time in his career.

O'Hair again opened the season with a solid performance in Hawaii at the Mercedes-Benz Championship, achieving a fourth-place finish. However he would not improve on this for the rest of the season and that finish was his best in a steady but unspectacular season. One highlight was his tied seventh-place finish at the 2010 Open Championship which was his career best at that major championship and his highest ever placing at any of the four majors. He also managed a top-5 result at the WGC-Bridgestone Invitational helped by a third round 64. O'Hair did not make into the tour finale at East Lake and finished the season ranked 47th on the FedEx Cup standings. However he did manage to maintain his ranking within the top 50 of the world despite limited success on the season.

O'Hair had a number of issues to deal with in 2011, one of which was that he split from his swing coach Sean Foley. For the first half of the season, O'Hair missed 10 out of 17 cuts from the start of the season to mid July, which included five straight missed cuts in the middle of the season. He was ranked well outside the top 125 after The Open Championship in July and his season best at that point was a tie for 16th place at Colonial. However O'Hair won the RBC Canadian Open, the first event after The Open Championship in a playoff over American Kris Blanks for his first PGA Tour title in over two years. O'Hair fought back from a second round 73 on the par 70 course to shoot 66-68 on the weekend. Only eight players finished under par for the week and O'Hair was tied at -4 with Kris Blanks after regulation play. Replaying the 18th, both players found trouble from the tee, O'Hair decided to lay well back and in the fairway, whereas Blanks went for it and found the greenside bunker. O'Hair played his pitch safely onto the front of the green, but Blanks' bunker shot trickled off the back of the green and he then pitched up to six feet away. O'Hair two putted for his bogey but when Blanks missed his six footer coming back, O'Hair was declared champion at the first extra hole. As a result of this win, O'Hair moved up from 147th to 43rd on the FedEx Cup list. Also having dropped out of the world's top 100 earlier in the season, he regained that place by rising to 60th in the rankings on July 25.

In 2013, O'Hair earned a joint runner-up finish at the Sony Open in Hawaii. He made the cut 19 times in 24 events and finished 63rd in the FedEx Cup. The following year, O'Hair only made 7 cuts in 22 events. He played in the Web.com Tour Finals and finished 16th to retain his PGA Tour card for 2014. In 2015, O'Hair was given a sponsor's exemption to the Valspar Championship in Tampa, Florida. He tied for the lead after shooting a final-round 4-under 67, which got him into a playoff with Jordan Spieth and Patrick Reed at 10-under 274. Spieth emerged victorious. O'Hair finished the season 58th on the money list to secure his card for 2016. In 2016, O'Hair finished 59th on the money list and re-entering the top 100 in the World Rankings.

== Personal life ==
O'Hair and his wife Jackie married in December 2002. They have four children.

== Professional wins (9) ==
=== PGA Tour wins (4) ===
No.	Date	Tournament	Winning score	Margin of victory	Runner(s)-up
1	Jul 10, 2005	John Deere Classic	−16 (66-69-66-65=268)	1 stroke	(United States) Robert Damron, (United States) Hank Kuehne
2	Mar 9, 2008	PODS Championship	−4 (69-71-71-69=280)	2 strokes	(United States) Stewart Cink, (Japan) Ryuji Imada, (United States) Troy Matteson, (United States) Billy Mayfair, (United States) George McNeill, (Australia) John Senden
3	May 3, 2009	Quail Hollow Championship	−11 (69-72-67-69=277)	1 stroke	(United States) Lucas Glover, (United States) Bubba Watson
4	Jul 24, 2011	RBC Canadian Open	−4 (67-71-69-69=276)	Playoff	(United States) Kris Blanks

PGA Tour playoff record (1–1)

No.	Year	Tournament	Opponent(s)	Result
1	2011	RBC Canadian Open	(United States) Kris Blanks	Won with bogey on first extra hole
2	2015	Valspar Championship	(United States) Patrick Reed, (United States) Jordan Spieth	Spieth won with birdie on third extra hole

=== New England Pro Golf Tour wins (2) ===
- 2003 Blackstone Open
- 2004 Sterling Open

=== Other wins (3) ===
No.	Date	Tournament	Winning score	Margin of victory	Runner(s)-up
1	Jun 16, 2004	Vermont Open	−8 (72-64-66=202)	2 strokes	(United States) Paul Dickson
2	Dec 9, 2012	Franklin Templeton Shootout (with (United States) Kenny Perry)	−31 (64-61-60=185)	1 stroke	(United States) Charles Howell III and (South Africa) Rory Sabbatini
3	Dec 10, 2017	QBE Shootout (2) (with (United States) Steve Stricker)	−26 (57-69-64=190)	2 strokes	(Republic of Ireland) Shane Lowry and (Northern Ireland) Graeme McDowell

Other playoff record (0–1)

No.	Year	Tournament	Opponent	Result
1	2009	Kiwi Challenge	(United States) Anthony Kim	Lost to bogey on first extra hole

== Results in major championships ==
Tournament	2005	2006	2007	2008	2009
Masters Tournament		CUT		T14	T10
U.S. Open		T26	CUT		T23
The Open Championship	T15	T14	T67	82	T65
PGA Championship	T59	T12	T42	T31	75

Tournament	2010	2011	2012	2013	2014	2015	2016	2017
Masters Tournament	T30	CUT	T32					CUT
U.S. Open	T12							CUT
The Open Championship	T7	CUT						T62
PGA Championship	CUT	T64	WD			T72		T33

Top 10
Did not play

CUT = missed the half-way cut
WD = withdrew
"T" = tied

=== Summary ===
Tournament	Wins	2nd	3rd	Top-5	Top-10	Top-25	Events	Cuts made
Masters Tournament	0	0	0	0	1	2	7	4
U.S. Open	0	0	0	0	0	2	5	3
The Open Championship	0	0	0	0	1	3	8	7
PGA Championship	0	0	0	0	0	1	10	8
Totals	0	0	0	0	2	8	30	22

- Most consecutive cuts made – 12 (2007 Open Championship – 2010 Open Championship)
- Longest streak of top-10s – 1 (twice)

== Results in The Players Championship ==
Tournament	2006	2007	2008	2009	2010	2011	2012	2013	2014	2015	2016	2017	2018
The Players Championship	T58	11	CUT	CUT	T22	T19	CUT	T43		CUT	T64	CUT	WD

Did not play

CUT = missed the halfway cut
WD = withdrew
"T" indicates a tie for a place

== Results in World Golf Championships ==
Results not in chronological order before 2015.

Tournament	2005	2006	2007	2008	2009	2010	2011	2012	2013	2014	2015	2016	2017
Championship				WD	T13	T18							T65
Match Play		R32			QF	R32	R64						
Invitational	T51			T12	T70	5	T59						
Champions					T62							T63	

Top 10
Did not play

WD = Withdrew
QF, R16, R32, R64 = Round in which player lost in match play
"T" = tied
Note that the HSBC Champions did not become a WGC event until 2009.

== U.S. national team appearances ==
- Presidents Cup: 2009 (winners)

== See also ==
- 2004 PGA Tour Qualifying School graduates
- 2013 Web.com Tour Finals graduates
- 2014 Web.com Tour Finals graduates
