= The Phar-Mor at Inverrary =

Golf tournament formerly on the LPGA Tour

Coordinates: 26.173°N 80.236°W

Tournament information
- Location: Lauderhill, Florida, U.S.
- Established: 1990
- Course: Inverrary Country Club
- Par: 72
- Length: 6,256 yards (5,720 m)
- Tour: LPGA Tour
- Format: Stroke play - 54 holes
- Prize fund: $500,000
- Month played: February
- Final year: 1992, 34 years ago

Tournament record score
- Aggregate: 206 Shelley Hamlin (1992)
- To par: −10 as above

Final champion
- (United States) Shelley Hamlin

Location in the United States
Location in Florida

The Phar-Mor at Inverrary was a women's professional golf tournament in Florida on the LPGA Tour, held from 1990 through 1992. The 54-hole event was played in February at the Inverrary Country Club in Lauderhill, northwest of Fort Lauderdale. It was sponsored by Phar-Mor, an Ohio-based chain of discount drug stores, which also sponsored the Phar-Mor in Youngstown.

Cancer survivor Shelley Hamlin, age 42, shot 66 (−6) on Sunday to win the final event by a stroke over three runners-up; it broke her 14-year victory drought on tour.

Inverrary previously hosted the Jackie Gleason-Inverrary Classic on the PGA Tour (1972–1983), and the Tournament Players Championship in 1976.

== Winners ==
Year	Champion	Winning score	To par	Margin of victory	Purse ($)	Winner's share ($)
1992	Shelley Hamlin	72-68-66=206	−10	1 stroke	500,000	75,000
1991	Beth Daniel	67-73-69=209	−7	2 strokes	500,000	75,000
1990	Jane Crafter	70-67-72=209	−7	1 stroke	400,000	60,000
