= Gary Nicklaus =

American professional golfer (born 1969)

Personal information
- Nationality: United States
- Born: January 15, 1969 (age 57) West Palm Beach, Florida, U.S.
- Height: 5 ft 10 in (1.78 m)
- Weight: 175 lb (79 kg; 12.5 st)

Career
- Sport: Golf
- College: Ohio State University
- Turned professional: 1991
- Current tour: PGA Tour Champions
- Former tours: PGA Tour; European Tour
- Professional wins: 1

Best results in major championships
- Masters Tournament: DNP
- PGA Championship: DNP
- U.S. Open: CUT: 1997, 2001
- The Open Championship: DNP

Gary Nicklaus (born January 15, 1969) is an American former professional golfer. He spent three years as a member of the PGA Tour from 2000 to 2003, and has played on numerous tours, including most recently the PGA Tour Champions. He is best known as the son of golfer Jack Nicklaus.

== Early life ==
The fourth of Jack and Barbara Nicklaus's five children, Gary was viewed from a young age as the most likely heir to his father's golfing legacy. He beat his father for the first time when he was fifteen and won many junior tournaments. At age sixteen, Gary appeared on the cover of Sports Illustrated billed as "The Next Nicklaus".

== Amateur career ==
Like his father, the younger Nicklaus attended Ohio State University and was an All-American on the golf team. He qualified for the 1990 U.S. Amateur at Cherry Hills Country Club near Denver, but was hospitalized with pericarditis after arriving in Colorado and missed the tournament.

Nicklaus returned to Ohio State to finish his college career in 1991, then won the prestigious Porter Cup and qualified again for the U.S. Amateur.

== Professional career ==
In 1991, Nicklaus turned professional. Over the next eight years, Nicklaus would make numerous failed attempts to qualify for the PGA Tour. He played in 26 PGA Tour events during that time, including the 1997 U.S. Open, but made only two cuts. Nicklaus spent most of his time playing overseas, including the European Tour in 1998, and on mini-tours. Finally, in 1999, Nicklaus made it through the PGA Tour Qualifying Tournament on his eighth try. A few weeks later, Nicklaus teamed with his father to win the Father/Son Challenge, a 36-hole tournament played in a scramble format.

Nicklaus started fairly slowly during his first year on the PGA Tour in 2000 but in April he put together three strong rounds at the BellSouth Classic in Atlanta, Georgia and found himself tied for the 54-hole lead with Phil Mickelson. When torrential rains struck on Sunday, leaving much of the course unplayable, Tour officials canceled the final round and called for a sudden-death playoff to determine a champion. On the first hole, a par-three, Mickelson hit the green while Nicklaus left his shot just short in a bunker. It took Nicklaus two more shots to get on the green, while Mickelson sank his birdie putt to win the tournament. Despite his disappointment, Nicklaus was encouraged, saying, "It just lets me know that there are good things coming down the road."

But the rest of 2000 did not bring much success for Nicklaus, who finished no higher than 25th in any subsequent tournament. However, the money he earned by finishing runner-up in Atlanta was enough to help him place 119th on the Tour money list and he retained his PGA Tour card.

In 2001, Nicklaus made just 12 cuts in 34 starts, with a best finish of 15th at the Memorial Tournament, an event founded by his father. He also qualified for the U.S. Open, his second appearance in a major tournament, but missed the cut. He placed 184th on the Tour money list and lost his playing privileges.

Forced to return to the qualifying tournament, Nicklaus again earned his card for 2002. But that season saw him make just six cuts in 26 events and it would be his final season on the PGA Tour. After spending 2003 primarily on the Tour's minor-league circuit (now the Korn Ferry Tour), Nicklaus stopped playing professional golf to focus on the family business.

Nicklaus is Chairman of the Board of Directors of Certuity, on the Board of Directors for Nicklaus Brown & Co., Goods & Services, Co-Chairman of the Children's Healthcare Charity, non-profit organization and primary beneficiary of the Honda Classic, and a government appointed Commissioner of the Florida Fish and Wildlife Conservation Commission.

== Reinstated amateur career ==
In 2007, Nicklaus was reinstated as an amateur by the United States Golf Association.

On August 20, 2008, a fire in Jupiter, Florida destroyed a home that was being built for Nicklaus.

Nicklaus made one more attempt to qualify for the PGA Tour in 2009 at the age of 40, but came up short. He continued to play in amateur events and qualified for the U.S. Amateur in 2012, when the tournament was once again being held at Cherry Hills. He shot 4-over-par in the stroke play portion of the event and failed to advance to the match play. Nicklaus qualified one last time for the U.S. Amateur in 2018 at the age of 49, when the event was held at Pebble Beach Golf Links, but again he did not advance to the match play.

== Second professional career ==
in 2019, after his 50th birthday, Nicklaus turned professional again to compete on the PGA Tour Champions circuit. He played eight events that season, mostly through sponsor exemptions, with a best finish of a tie for 29th at the Dick's Sporting Goods Open. In November 2019, Nicklaus attempted to gain full-time status on the tour through the PGA Tour Champions Qualifying Tournament but failed to make it past the first stage. Nicklaus only played in five events in the pandemic-impacted 2020–21 PGA Tour Champions season and competed just once in 2022.

Nicklaus joined the board of the Florida Fish and Wildlife Conservation Commission in 2017 as an appointee of Governor Rick Scott. In 2022, he was reappointed for a five-year term by Governor Ron DeSantis.

== Professional wins (1) ==
=== Other wins (1) ===
No.	Date	Tournament	Winning score	To par	Margin of victory	Runners-up
1	Dec 5, 1999	Office Depot Father/Son Challenge (with father Jack Nicklaus)	60-59=119	−25	Playoff	(United States) Raymond Floyd and son Robert Floyd

Other playoff record (1–0)

No.	Year	Tournament	Opponents	Result
1	1999	Office Depot Father/Son Challenge (with father Jack Nicklaus)	(United States) Raymond Floyd and son Robert Floyd	Won with birdie on third extra hole

== Playoff record ==
PGA Tour playoff record (0–1)

No.	Year	Tournament	Opponent	Result
1	2000	BellSouth Classic	(United States) Phil Mickelson	Lost to birdie on first extra hole

== Results in major championships ==
Tournament	1997	1998	1999	2000	2001
U.S. Open	CUT				CUT

Note: Nicklaus only played in the U.S. Open.

Did not play

CUT = missed the half-way cut

== Results in The Players Championship ==
Tournament	2001
The Players Championship	CUT

CUT = missed the half-way cut

== Results in senior major championships ==
Tournament	2019	2020	2021
The Tradition		NT	
Senior PGA Championship		NT	CUT
Senior Players Championship			
U.S. Senior Open	T55	NT	
Senior British Open Championship	CUT	NT	

Did not play

"T" indicates a tie for a place
CUT = missed the halfway cut
NT = No tournament due to COVID-19 pandemic

== See also ==
- 1999 PGA Tour Qualifying School graduates
- 2001 PGA Tour Qualifying School graduates
