= Atlanta Open =

Atlanta Open may refer to:

- Atlanta Open (tennis), a men's tennis tournament on the ATP World Tour 250 Series
- Atlanta Classic, a defunct men's golf tournament on the PGA Tour
