= 2007 Players Championship =

Tournament information
- Dates: May 10–13, 2007
- Location: Ponte Vedra Beach, Florida; 30.198°N 81.394°W
- Courses: TPC Sawgrass; Stadium Course
- Tour: PGA Tour

Statistics
- Par: 72
- Length: 7,215 yards (6,597 m)
- Field: 145 players, 79 after cut
- Cut: 149 (+5)
- Prize fund: $9.0 million
- Winner's share: $1.62 million

Champion
- (United States) Phil Mickelson
- 277 (−11)

Location map
- Location in the United States Location in Florida

The 2007 Players Championship was a golf tournament in Florida on the PGA Tour, held May 10–13 at TPC Sawgrass in Ponte Vedra Beach, southeast of Jacksonville. It was the 34th Players Championship and was won by Phil Mickelson, two strokes ahead of runner-up Sergio García.

== Tournament summary ==
With the new PGA Tour season arrangement in 2007, the tournament was played in May for the first time and concluded on Mother's Day. Previous tournaments were typically played in late March, two weeks before the Masters Tournament.

Defending champion Stephen Ames missed the 36-hole cut by seven strokes.

== Venue ==
This was the 26th Players Championship held at the TPC at Sawgrass Stadium Course in Ponte Vedra Beach, Florida. The renovated course was lengthened 117 yards (107 m) from the previous year to 7,215 yards (6,597 m).

=== Course layout ===
The 2007 Players Championship
Tee	Rating/Slope	1	2	3	4	5	6	7	8	9	Out	10	11	12	13	14	15	16	17	18	In	Total
Yards	n/a	423	532	177	384	471	393	442	237	583	3,642	424	558	358	181	481	449	523	137	462	3,573	7,215
Par		4	5	3	4	4	4	4	3	5	36	4	5	4	3	4	4	5	3	4	36	72

== Eligibility requirements ==
Winners of PGA Tour co-sponsored or approved tournaments, whose victories are considered official, since the previous year's Players Championship.

Phil Mickelson, Aaron Baddeley, Stuart Appleby, Chris Couch, Jim Furyk, Brett Wetterich, Tim Herron, Jeff Maggert, Carl Pettersson, Vijay Singh, Geoff Ogilvy, Ben Curtis, J. J. Henry, Trevor Immelman, John Senden, Tiger Woods, John Rollins, Corey Pavin, Dean Wilson, Will MacKenzie, Eric Axley, D. J. Trahan, Davis Love III, Troy Matteson, Joe Durant, K. J. Choi, Adam Scott, Paul Goydos, Charley Hoffman, Charles Howell III, Henrik Stenson, Fred Funk, Mark Wilson, Mark Calcavecchia, Zach Johnson, Boo Weekley, Nick Watney, Scott Verplank

The top 125 finishers on the 2006 Official PGA Tour money list.

Luke Donald, David Toms, Rory Sabbatini, Chad Campbell, Stewart Cink, Rod Pampling, Retief Goosen, Brett Quigley, Lucas Glover, Arron Oberholser, Tom Pernice Jr., Stephen Ames, Ernie Els, José María Olazábal, Tim Clark, Mike Weir, Steve Stricker, Vaughn Taylor, Camilo Villegas, Jerry Kelly, Nathan Green, Tom Lehman, Jason Bohn, Frank Lickliter, Shaun Micheel, Sergio García, Richard S. Johnson, Ian Poulter, Chris DiMarco, Daniel Chopra, Robert Allenby, J. B. Holmes, Steve Flesch, Sean O'Hair, Jonathan Byrd, Bo Van Pelt, Billy Mayfair, Bob Estes, Pádraig Harrington, Greg Owen, Bart Bryant, Jesper Parnevik, Jeff Sluman, Ted Purdy, Heath Slocum, Woody Austin, Shigeki Maruyama, Steve Lowery, Ryan Moore, Hunter Mahan, Ryan Palmer, Mathew Goggin, Joe Ogilvie, Billy Andrade, Brian Gay, Bubba Watson, Charles Warren, Ryuji Imada, Nick O'Hern, Daisuke Maruyama, David Howell, Harrison Frazar, Bill Haas, Kent Jones, Briny Baird, Peter Lonard, Kenny Perry, Joey Sindelar, Jeff Gove, Freddie Jacobson, Justin Leonard, Kirk Triplett, Brian Davis, Olin Browne, Kevin Sutherland, Stephen Leaney, Pat Perez, Jason Gore, David Branshaw, Paul Azinger, J. P. Hayes, Shane Bertsch, Mathias Grönberg, Darren Clarke

For the duration of their exemption, PGA Tour members who earned a Tournament Winner exemption prior to March 1, 2004.

Winners of the Players Championship, Masters, U.S. Open, British Open, and PGA Championship in 1997 and from 2002 to 2006. Beginning with 1998, winners will be eligible for five years.

Steve Elkington, Craig Perks, Todd Hamilton, Rich Beem, Michael Campbell

Winners of the NEC World Series of Golf in the last 10 years (1997).

Winners of the Tour Championship in the last three years (2004-2006).

Winners of the World Golf Championship-Accenture Match Play Championship and World Golf Championships-CA Championship in the last three years (2005-2007).

Winner of the World Golf Championships - Bridgestone Invitational in the last three years (2004-2006).

Any player(s), not otherwise eligible, among the top 50 leaders from the Official World Golf Rankings through the Wachovia Championship.

Paul Casey, Colin Montgomerie, Robert Karlsson, Niclas Fasth, Charl Schwartzel

Any player(s), not otherwise eligible, among the top 10 leaders from the 2007 Official PGA Tour Money List through the Wachovia Championship.

The winner of the 2006 Constellation Energy Senior Players Championship. (Such exemption will be an addition to the field.)

Bobby Wadkins

The leading money winner from the 2006 Official Nationwide Tour Money List.

Ken Duke

If necessary to complete a field of 144 players, PGA Tour members from the 2007 Official PGA Tour Money List below 10th position through the Wachovia Championship, in order of their position on such list.

Anthony Kim, Jeff Quinney, José Cóceres, John Mallinger, Rocco Mediate, Brandt Snedeker, Robert Garrigus, Bernhard Langer, Steve Marino, Doug LaBelle II, Cliff Kresge

== Round summaries ==
=== First round ===
Thursday, May 10, 2007

In gusty winds, a record 50 balls found the water at the 17th hole, which broke the single-round tournament record of 45 set in 2000.

Place	Player	Score	To par
T1	(United States) Phil Mickelson	67	−5
T1	(South Africa) Rory Sabbatini	67	−5
3	(United States) Chris DiMarco	68	−4
4	(Australia) Peter Lonard	69	−3
T5	(United States) Jason Gore	70	−2
T5	(United States) Tom Lehman	70	−2
T5	(Australia) Rod Pampling	70	−2
T5	(Sweden) Carl Pettersson	70	−2
T9	(United States) Rich Beem	71	−1
T9	(South Korea) K. J. Choi	71	−1
T9	(England) Brian Davis	71	−1
T9	(United States) Jim Furyk	71	−1
T9	(South Africa) Retief Goosen	71	−1
T9	(Australia) Nathan Green	71	−1
T9	(United States) J. P. Hayes	71	−1
T9	(United States) Jeff Quinney	71	−1

=== Second round ===
Friday, May 11, 2007

Place	Player	Score	To par
1	(United States) Phil Mickelson	67-72=139	−5
2	(Australia) Nathan Green	71-69=140	−4
T3	(Australia) Peter Lonard	69-72=141	−3
T3	(United States) Sean O'Hair	72-69=141	−3
T3	(Australia) Rod Pampling	70-71=141	−3
T3	(Sweden) Carl Pettersson	70-71=141	−3
T7	(United States) Chris DiMarco	68-74=142	−2
T7	(United States) Tom Pernice Jr.	74-68=142	−2
T9	(United States) Stewart Cink	74-69=143	−1
T9	(Argentina) José Cóceres	73-70=143	−1
T9	(United States) Jim Furyk	71-72=143	−1
T9	(Australia) Mathew Goggin	72-71=143	−1
T9	(United States) Tom Lehman	70-73=143	−1
T9	(United States) Rocco Mediate	72-71=143	−1
T9	(United States) Kirk Triplett	75-68=143	−1

=== Third round ===
Saturday, May 12, 2007

Place	Player	Score	To par
1	(United States) Sean O'Hair	72-69-66=207	−9
2	(United States) Phil Mickelson	67-72-69=208	−8
T3	(Australia) Peter Lonard	69-72-68=209	−7
T3	(United States) Jeff Quinney	71-74-64=209	−7
T5	(Australia) Aaron Baddeley	72-72-67=211	−5
T5	(Argentina) José Cóceres	73-70-68=211	−5
T5	(United States) Chris DiMarco	68-74-69=211	−5
T5	(England) Luke Donald	74-72-65=211	−5
T5	(Sweden) Carl Pettersson	70-71-70=211	−5
T10	(South Africa) Tim Clark	73-72-67=212	−4
T10	(United States) J. P. Hayes	71-73-68=212	−4
T10	(Australia) Geoff Ogilvy	74-71-67=212	−4

=== Final round ===
Sunday, May 13, 2007

Phil Mickelson won his first Players Championship after shooting a final round 69 to pass 54-hole leader Sean O'Hair. Mickelson birdied his first two holes and made his lone bogey at the 18th hole after the tournament was locked up. O'Hair was two strokes behind Mickelson as they headed to the infamous par-3 17th hole, but he hit two balls in the water going after the tucked pin on the island green for a quadruple bogey. O'Hair also bogeyed the final hole, and the mistakes dropped him from second to eleventh place, costing him $747,000 in prize money.

Champion
(c) = past champion

Place	Player	Score	To par	Money ($)
1	(United States) Phil Mickelson	67-72-69-69=277	−11	1,620,000
2	(Spain) Sergio García	73-73-67-66=279	−9	972,000
T3	(United States) Stewart Cink	74-69-71-66=280	−8	522,000
T3	(Spain) José María Olazábal	78-66-69-67=280	−8	522,000
5	(Argentina) José Cóceres	73-70-68-70=281	−7	360,000
T6	(United States) J. P. Hayes	71-73-68-70=282	−6	281,700
T6	(Sweden) Robert Karlsson	77-68-71-66=282	−6	281,700
T6	(Australia) Peter Lonard	69-72-68-73=282	−6	281,700
T6	(United States) Jeff Quinney	71-74-64-73=282	−6	281,700
T6	(Australia) Adam Scott (c)	74-71-70-67=282	−6	281,700

Leaderboard below the top 10
Place	Player	Score	To par	Money ($)
11	(United States) Sean O'Hair	72-69-66-76=283	−5	225,000
T12	(United States) Chris DiMarco	68-74-69-73=284	−4	182,250
T12	(Australia) Steve Elkington (c)	73-71-70-70=284	−4	182,250
T12	(Australia) Mathew Goggin	72-71-71-70=284	−4	182,250
T12	(United States) Brandt Snedeker	72-74-68-70=284	−4	182,250
T16	(Australia) Stuart Appleby	74-71-71-69=285	−3	126,257
T16	(United States) Jonathan Byrd	74-71-71-69=285	−3	126,257
T16	(England) Luke Donald	74-72-65-74=285	−3	126,257
T16	(Australia) Nathan Green	71-69-74-71=285	−3	126,257
T16	(United States) J. B. Holmes	76-72-69-68=285	−3	126,257
T16	(United States) Zach Johnson	73-73-70-69=285	−3	126,257
T16	(United States) Ted Purdy	74-73-67-71=285	−3	126,257
T23	(South Korea) K. J. Choi	71-74-70-71=286	−2	80,100
T23	(United States) Jason Gore	70-74-72-70=286	−2	80,100
T23	(United States) Tom Lehman	70-73-73-70=286	−2	80,100
T23	(Sweden) Henrik Stenson	72-76-66-72=286	−2	80,100
T23	(United States) Kirk Triplett	75-68-73-70=286	−2	80,100
T28	(United States) Joe Durant	76-71-69-71=287	−1	56,100
T28	(United States) Jim Furyk	71-72-74-70=287	−1	56,100
T28	(South Africa) Retief Goosen	71-74-71-71=287	−1	56,100
T28	(United States) Jerry Kelly	73-73-69-72=287	−1	56,100
T28	(United States) Cliff Kresge	72-72-69-74=287	−1	56,100
T28	(United States) Steve Lowery	78-66-71-72=287	−1	56,100
T28	(United States) Tom Pernice Jr.	74-68-72-73=287	−1	56,100
T28	(Sweden) Carl Pettersson	70-71-70-76=287	−1	56,100
T28	(England) Ian Poulter	75-71-72-69=287	−1	56,100
T37	(Australia) Aaron Baddeley	72-72-67-77=288	E	38,700
T37	(United States) Ken Duke	76-72-70-70=288	E	38,700
T37	(South Africa) Ernie Els	73-73-72-70=288	E	38,700
T37	(United States) Frank Lickliter	77-72-69-70=288	E	38,700
T37	(Australia) Geoff Ogilvy	74-71-67-76=288	E	38,700
T37	(Canada) Mike Weir	75-72-72-69=288	E	38,700
T37	(United States) Tiger Woods (c)	75-73-73-67=288	E	38,700
T44	(Sweden) Daniel Chopra	74-71-76-68=289	+1	26,010
T44	(United States) Rocco Mediate	72-71-77-69=289	+1	26,010
T44	(Australia) Rod Pampling	70-71-80-68=289	+1	26,010
T44	(South Africa) Rory Sabbatini	67-79-71-72=289	+1	26,010
T44	(Fiji) Vijay Singh	74-71-70-74=289	+1	26,010
T44	(United States) Heath Slocum	78-71-69-71=289	+1	26,010
T44	(United States) Scott Verplank	72-77-68-72=289	+1	26,010
T44	(United States) Boo Weekley	74-73-71-71=289	+1	26,010
T52	(United States) Harrison Frazar	74-71-73-72=290	+2	20,880
T52	(Republic of Ireland) Pádraig Harrington	76-70-74-70=290	+2	20,880
T52	(United States) Tim Herron	77-71-73-69=290	+2	20,880
T52	(Australia) John Senden	73-74-71-72=290	+2	20,880
T52	(United States) Steve Stricker	72-75-70-73=290	+2	20,880
T52	(United States) Brett Wetterich	74-75-71-70=290	+2	20,880
T58	(United States) Rich Beem	71-73-74-73=291	+3	19,710
T58	(Germany) Bernhard Langer	72-77-73-69=291	+3	19,710
T58	(United States) Kenny Perry	73-75-73-70=291	+3	19,710
T58	(United States) John Rollins	76-71-68-76=291	+3	19,710
T58	(South Africa) Charl Schwartzel	74-75-69-73=291	+3	19,710
T58	(United States) Kevin Sutherland	73-71-74-73=291	+3	19,710
T64	(United States) Paul Azinger	78-71-70-73=292	+4	18,810
T64	(United States) John Mallinger	73-74-72-73=292	+4	18,810
T64	(United States) Arron Oberholser	73-73-79-67=292	+4	18,810
T64	(United States) David Toms	77-72-73-70=292	+4	18,810
T68	(South Africa) Tim Clark	73-72-67-81=293	+5	18,090
T68	(Japan) Ryuji Imada	77-71-75-70=293	+5	18,090
T68	(United States) Ryan Moore	78-69-75-71=293	+5	18,090
T68	(United States) Joey Sindelar	74-75-72-72=293	+5	18,090
T72	(Sweden) Mathias Grönberg	75-73-74-72=294	+6	17,460
T72	(United States) Bill Haas	76-73-73-72=294	+6	17,460
T72	(United States) Corey Pavin	75-72-71-76=294	+6	17,460
T75	(United States) Todd Hamilton	75-73-76-71=295	+7	16,830
T75	(United States) Charley Hoffman	75-69-76-75=295	+7	16,830
T75	(United States) Davis Love III (c)	77-71-73-74=295	+7	16,830
T75	(United States) Ryan Palmer	77-72-71-75=295	+7	16,830
79	(United States) Charles Howell III	73-74-75-76=298	+10	16,380
CUT	(United States) Bart Bryant	76-74=150	+6	
CUT	(United States) Brian Gay	80-70=150	+6	
CUT	(United States) Jeff Gove	79-71=150	+6	
CUT	(United States) J. J. Henry	76-74=150	+6	
CUT	(Sweden) Freddie Jacobson	76-74=150	+6	
CUT	(United States) Kent Jones	80-70=150	+6	
CUT	(Australia) Stephen Leaney	77-73=150	+6	
CUT	(United States) Justin Leonard (c)	78-72=150	+6	
CUT	(United States) Hunter Mahan	78-72=150	+6	
CUT	(Japan) Shigeki Maruyama	76-74=150	+6	
CUT	(United States) Shaun Micheel	75-75=150	+6	
CUT	(Scotland) Colin Montgomerie	76-74=150	+6	
CUT	(United States) Brett Quigley	78-72=150	+6	
CUT	(United States) D. J. Trahan	76-74=150	+6	
CUT	(United States) Mark Wilson	79-71=150	+6	
CUT	(United States) Woody Austin	81-70=151	+7	
CUT	(United States) Eric Axley	75-76=151	+7	
CUT	(United States) Shane Bertsch	73-78=151	+7	
CUT	(England) Brian Davis	71-80=151	+7	
CUT	(United States) Bob Estes	82-69=151	+7	
CUT	(United States) Steve Flesch	79-72=151	+7	
CUT	(United States) Jeff Maggert	80-71=151	+7	
CUT	(Australia) Nick O'Hern	76-75=151	+7	
CUT	(New Zealand) Craig Perks (c)	75-76=151	+7	
CUT	(United States) Vaughn Taylor	75-76=151	+7	
CUT	(United States) Dean Wilson	75-76=151	+7	
CUT	(Australia) Robert Allenby	74-78=152	+8	
CUT	(United States) Briny Baird	78-74=152	+8	
CUT	(United States) Chris Couch	77-75=152	+8	
CUT	(South Africa) Trevor Immelman	80-72=152	+8	
CUT	(Sweden) Richard S. Johnson	78-74=152	+8	
CUT	(United States) Doug LaBelle II	77-75=152	+8	
CUT	(United States) Billy Mayfair	78-74=152	+8	
CUT	(United States) Joe Ogilvie	79-73=152	+8	
CUT	(United States) Bo Van Pelt	77-75=152	+8	
CUT	(United States) Bobby Wadkins	77-75=152	+8	
CUT	(United States) Charles Warren	78-74=152	+8	
CUT	(United States) Bubba Watson	77-75=152	+8	
CUT	(United States) David Branshaw	82-71=153	+9	
CUT	(United States) Fred Funk (c)	80-73=153	+9	
CUT	(United States) Will MacKenzie	74-79=153	+9	
CUT	(United States) Troy Matteson	75-78=153	+9	
CUT	(Sweden) Jesper Parnevik	76-77=153	+9	
CUT	(Colombia) Camilo Villegas	80-73=153	+9	
CUT	(United States) Billy Andrade	81-73=154	+10	
CUT	(New Zealand) Michael Campbell	75-79=154	+10	
CUT	(England) Paul Casey	76-78=154	+10	
CUT	(United States) Ben Curtis	76-78=154	+10	
CUT	(Sweden) Niclas Fasth	78-76=154	+10	
CUT	(United States) Jason Bohn	76-79=155	+11	
CUT	(England) Greg Owen	77-78=155	+11	
CUT	(United States) Pat Perez	77-78=155	+11	
CUT	(United States) Jeff Sluman	75-80=155	+11	
CUT	(United States) Nick Watney	75-80=155	+11	
CUT	(Canada) Stephen Ames (c)	77-79=156	+12	
CUT	(United States) Olin Browne	81-75=156	+12	
CUT	(United States) Mark Calcavecchia	82-74=156	+12	
CUT	(United States) Lucas Glover	79-77=156	+12	
CUT	(United States) Chad Campbell	79-78=157	+13	
CUT	(United States) Paul Goydos	80-77=157	+13	
CUT	(United States) Steve Marino	81-78=159	+15	
CUT	(United States) Robert Garrigus	85-75=160	+16	
CUT	(United States) Anthony Kim	78-83=161	+17	
WD	(Japan) Daisuke Maruyama	85	+13	
WD	(Northern Ireland) Darren Clarke			
WD	(England) David Howell			

==== Scorecard ====
Hole	1	2	3	4	5	6	7	8	9	10	11	12	13	14	15	16	17	18
Par	4	5	3	4	4	4	4	3	5	4	5	4	3	4	4	5	3	4
(United States) Mickelson	−9	−10	−10	−10	−10	−10	−11	−11	−11	−11	−12	−12	−12	−12	−12	−12	−12	−11
(Spain) García	−3	−4	−4	−5	−4	−4	−4	−4	−4	−5	−5	−5	−5	−6	−7	−8	−9	−9
(United States) Cink	−2	−3	−3	−3	−3	−3	−4	−4	−4	−5	−5	−5	−6	−6	−6	−7	−7	−8
(Spain) Olazábal	−2	−3	−3	−3	−3	−3	−4	−4	−5	−6	−7	−8	−8	−8	−7	−8	−8	−8
(Argentina) Cóceres	−4	−4	−4	−5	−5	−5	−4	−4	−4	−4	−5	−5	−5	−5	−5	−6	−7	−7
(United States) O'Hair	−9	−10	−10	−10	−10	−10	−10	−10	−11	−10	−10	−10	−10	−10	−10	−10	−6	−5

Cumulative tournament scores, relative to par

Birdie	Bogey	Double bogey	Triple bogey+
