= Atlanta Country Club =

Golf club in Georgia, US

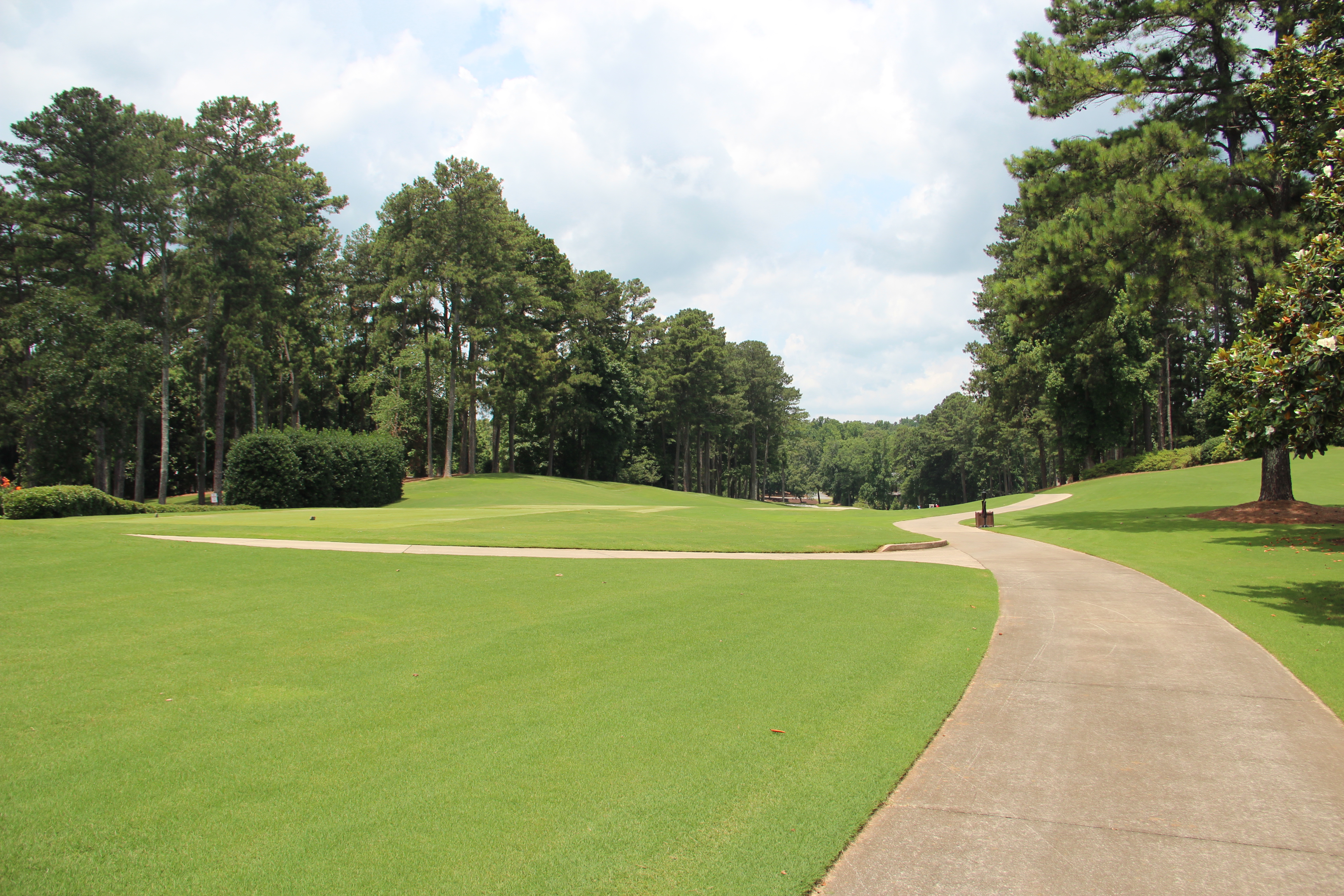

- Location within the United States Location within Georgia
- 33.94°N 84.426°W

Club information
- Location: East Cobb, Georgia, U.S.
- Established: 1964, 62 years ago
- Type: Private
- Total holes: 18
- Website: atlantacountryclub.org

Course Information
- Designed by: Willard C. Byrd
- Par: 72
- Length: 7,110 yards (6,501 m)
- Course rating: 75.6
- Slope rating: 147

Atlanta Country Club is a private golf club in the southeastern United States, located in the Chattahoochee Plantation section of East Cobb, Georgia, a suburb northwest of Atlanta. The club was founded 62 years ago in 1964 and opened two years later.

== History ==
The Atlanta Country Club has had the distinction of hosting many golf tournaments over the years and most notably the Atlanta Classic on the PGA Tour for 29 years (1967–1996). The tournament's name changed three times during its tenure at the Atlanta Country Club. The Atlanta Classic was held at the Atlanta Country club from Atlanta Classic (1967–1981) but not in 1974 or 1976, due to other events.

It hosted the inaugural Tournament Players Championship in 1974, won by Jack Nicklaus on Labor Day. Originally a rotating event, it relocated in 1982 to its present home TPC at Sawgrass in Ponte Vedra Beach, Florida. The Atlanta Classic was not played in 1976 because the U.S. Open was at Atlanta Athletic Club.

The Atlanta Golf Classic was later named the Georgia-Pacific Atlanta Golf Classic (1982–1988), BellSouth Atlanta Golf Classic (1989–1991), and finally the BellSouth Classic (1992–1996). The Bell South Classic moved to TPC at Sugarloaf in 1997.

The Atlanta Country Club has also hosted two amateur tournaments conducted by the United States Golf Association. It hosted the 14th United States Senior Men's Amateur Golf Championship in 1968, won by Curtis Person, Sr., and the 71st United States Women's Amateur Golf Championship in 1971, won by Laura Baugh.
