= Kamaiu Johnson =

American professional golfer

Kamaiu Johnson (born c.1994) is an American professional golfer from Tallahassee, Florida. He has won ten tournaments on mini-tours, and received sponsors invites to play in events on the PGA Tour.

Success on the Advocates Pro Golf Association (APGA) Tour, which aims to improve opportunities for black and ethnic minority players, including victory in the 2020 Tour Championship, resulted in Johnson being offered a sponsors exemption to play in the Farmers Insurance Open on the elite PGA Tour in 2021. Due to a positive test for COVID-19 he was forced to withdraw from the tournament prior to the first round. He was later invited to play in the tour's AT&T Pebble Beach Pro-Am and The Honda Classic, and an event on the Korn Ferry Tour.
