= Ryuji Imada =

Japanese professional golfer (born 1976)

Ryuji Imada 今田 竜二
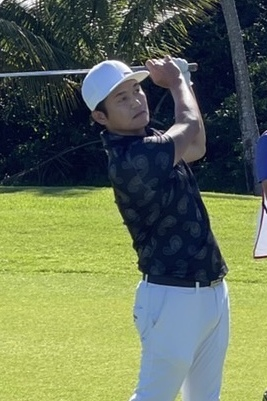
- Imada in 2022

Personal information
- Nationality: Japan
- Born: 19 October 1976 (age 50) Mihara, Japan
- Height: 5 ft 8 in (1.73 m)
- Weight: 150 lb (68 kg; 11 st)
- Spouse: Shelly Imada (m. 2019)

Career
- Sport: Golf
- College: University of Georgia
- Turned professional: 1999
- Current tour: PGA Tour
- Professional wins: 3
- Highest ranking: 49 (18 May 2008)

Number of wins by tour
- PGA Tour: 1
- Korn Ferry Tour: 2

Best results in major championships
- Masters Tournament: T20: 2009
- PGA Championship: CUT: 2007, 2008, 2009, 2011
- U.S. Open: T12: 2006
- The Open Championship: 64th: 2009

Ryuji Imada (今田 竜二, Imada Ryūji; born 19 October 1976) is a U.S.-based Japanese professional golfer.

== Early life and amateur career ==
Imada was born in Mihara, Hiroshima. He came to the United States when he was 14 to attend a Tampa golf academy for Asian players. His instructor was (and still is) Richard Abele, who became his legal guardian. Under Abele's teaching, he won several of the top tournaments on the amateur circuit and reached the final of the 1997 U.S. Amateur Public Links. His accomplishments in the American Junior Golf Association led to a scholarship to University of Georgia, where he played for two years and helped the Bulldogs win the 1999 NCAA title.

== Professional career ==
In 1999, Imada turned professional. From 2000 to 2004 he played on the second tier Nationwide Tour, winning the 2000 Buy.com Virginia Beach Open and the 2004 BMW Charity Pro-Am at The Cliffs. On the Monday following his win, Imada fired a back-nine score of 29 in U.S. Open qualifying at Scotch Valley, in Hollidaysburg, Pennsylvania. He was the medalist, with a score of 64, and advanced to sectional qualifying. His third-place finish on the 2004 money list earned him promotion to the PGA Tour.

In Imada's first season at the elite level, he had a best placing of fifth and earned enough money to retain his tour card for 2006. In the 2006 U.S. Open, he fired closing rounds of 69 and 71 to finish in a tie for 12th. His 69 in round three was one of only six under par rounds during a brutal weekend at Winged Foot.

In 2007, Imada had his best finish on the PGA Tour, finishing in 2nd place at the AT&T Classic, winning $583,200. In 2008, Imada again finished in 2nd place at the Buick Invitational, moving him into the top 100 of the Official World Golf Rankings. In May 2008 he won his first PGA Tour tournament at the AT&T Classic, beating Kenny Perry in a playoff, and reached the top 50 of the world rankings for the first time.

Imada was unable to follow up his win and split his time among the PGA Tour, Web.com Tour, and Japan Golf Tour.

== Amateur wins ==
this list may be incomplete

- 1995 Porter Cup, AJGA Tournament of Champions
- 1996 Azalea Invitational

== Professional wins (3) ==
=== PGA Tour wins (1) ===
| No. | Date | Tournament | Winning score | Margin of victory | Runner-up |
|---|---|---|---|---|---|
| 1 | 18 May 2008 | AT&T Classic | −15 (71-69-66-67=273) | Playoff | (United States) Kenny Perry |

PGA Tour playoff record (1–1)

| No. | Year | Tournament | Opponent | Result |
|---|---|---|---|---|
| 1 | 2007 | AT&T Classic | (United States) Zach Johnson | Lost to birdie on first extra hole |
| 2 | 2008 | AT&T Classic | (United States) Kenny Perry | Won with par on first extra hole |

=== Nationwide Tour wins (2) ===
| No. | Date | Tournament | Winning score | Margin of victory | Runner-up |
|---|---|---|---|---|---|
| 1 | 21 May 2000 | Buy.com Virginia Beach Open | −13 (71-68-68-68=275) | 5 strokes | (United States) Todd Demsey |
| 2 | 2 May 2004 | BMW Charity Pro-Am | −17 (70-66-65-69=270) | Playoff | (Australia) Paul Gow |

Nationwide Tour playoff record (1–0)

| No. | Year | Tournament | Opponent | Result |
|---|---|---|---|---|
| 1 | 2004 | BMW Charity Pro-Am | (Australia) Paul Gow | Won with birdie on fifth extra hole |

== Results in major championships ==
| Tournament | 2000 | 2001 | 2002 | 2003 | 2004 | 2005 | 2006 | 2007 | 2008 | 2009 | 2010 | 2011 |
|---|---|---|---|---|---|---|---|---|---|---|---|---|
| Masters Tournament | | | | | | | | | | T20 | | |
| U.S. Open | CUT | | | | | T15 | T12 | CUT | T18 | CUT | | |
| The Open Championship | | | | | | | | | CUT | 64 | | |
| PGA Championship | | | | | | | | CUT | CUT | CUT | | CUT |

Did not play

CUT = missed the half-way cut
"T" = tied

== Results in The Players Championship ==
| Tournament | 2006 | 2007 | 2008 | 2009 | 2010 | 2011 | 2012 |
|---|---|---|---|---|---|---|---|
| The Players Championship | CUT | T68 | CUT | T45 | T39 | CUT | CUT |

CUT = missed the halfway cut
"T" indicates a tie for a place

== Results in World Golf Championships ==
| Tournament | 2008 | 2009 |
|---|---|---|
| Match Play | | |
| Championship | T34 | T40 |
| Invitational | | |
| Champions | | |

Did not play

"T" = Tied
Note that the HSBC Champions did not become a WGC event until 2009.

== Team appearances ==
- World Cup (representing Japan): 2008, 2009

== See also ==
- 2004 Nationwide Tour graduates
