= Eagle Trace Golf Club =

- Interactive map of Eagle Trace Golf Club
- 26.25°N 80.29°W

Club information
- Location: Coral Springs, Florida
- Established: 1983
- Type: Public
- Owner: Club Link
- Operator: Club Link
- Tota holes: 18
- Tournaments: Honda Classic (1984–91, 1996)
- Designed by: Arthur Hills
- Par: 72
- Length: 7,042 yards

Eagle Trace is a public golf club located within the gated community of Eagle Trace in Coral Springs, Florida.

The Arthur Hills-designed championship golf course is a member of the Tournament Players Club network operated by the PGA Tour. It has hosted many high-profile tournaments, including the tour's Honda Classic from 1984 to 1991 and again in 1996.

In 2007, the facility was sold to the Heritage Golf Group, but retained its TPC branding under a licensing agreement.

In 2018, TPC Eagle Trace lost its branding.
