= 1976 Tournament Players Championship =

Tournament information
- Dates: February 26 – March 1, 1976
- Location: Lauderhill, Florida, U.S. 26.173°N 80.236°W
- Courses: Inverrary Country Club; East Course
- Tour: PGA Tour

Statistics
- Par: 72
- Length: 7,128 yards (6,518 m)
- Field: 143 players, 81 after cut
- Cut: 145 (+1)
- Prize fund: $300,000
- Winner's share: $60,000

Champion
- (United States) Jack Nicklaus
- 269 (−19)

Location map
- Location in the United States Location in Florida

The 1976 Tournament Players Championship was a golf tournament in Florida on the PGA Tour, held February 26 to March 1 at Inverrary Country Club in Lauderhill, northwest of Fort Lauderdale. This was the third Tournament Players Championship; Jack Nicklaus won his second title, three strokes ahead of runner-up J. C. Snead, similar to his 1974 win.

Saturday was washed out by a thunderstorm; the third round was on Sunday and the final round on Monday.

Defending champion Al Geiberger finished fifteen strokes back, in a tie for 24th place.

The first two editions had been played in late summer, after the major championships; this year's began in late February. This was the final year the Tournament Players Championship name was attached to an established PGA Tour event.

== Venue ==
This was the only Tournament Players Championship held in south Florida; the first was in Georgia and the second in Texas. It relocated to northeast Florida at Ponte Vedra Beach in 1977, where it became a standalone event for the first time. The Cognizant Classic in the Palm Beaches, which is currently played in the Palm Beach area since 2003, was originally hosted by Inverrary from 1972 through 1983. The tournament recognises the 1976 Players Championship winner as a winner of their tournament, as from 1974-76, an established tournament was given the title with special qualifications.

== Round summaries ==
=== First round ===
Thursday, February 26, 1976
Friday, February 27, 1976

Place	Player	Score	To par
T1	(United States) Fred Marti	66	−6
T1	(United States) Jack Nicklaus	66	−6
T3	(United States) Barry Jaeckel	67	−5
T3	(United States) Don January	67	−5
T3	(United States) J. C. Snead	67	−5
T3	(United States) Tom Watson	67	−5
T7	(United States) George Burns	68	−4
T7	(United States) Dale Douglass	68	−4
T7	(United States) Bob Gilder	68	−4
T7	(United States) John Mahaffey	68	−4
T7	(United States) Ed Sneed	68	−4

=== Second round ===
Friday, February 27, 1976

Place	Player	Score	To par
1	(United States) Don January	67-68=135	−9
T2	(United States) Jack Nicklaus	66-70=136	−8
T2	(United States) J. C. Snead	67-69=136	−8
T4	(United States) Jim Masserio	69-68=137	−7
T4	(United States) Tom Watson	67-70=137	−7
T6	(United States) Butch Baird	71-67=138	−6
T6	(United States) George Burns	71-67=138	−6
T6	(United States) Dale Douglass	68-70=138	−6
T6	(United States) Mark Hayes	71-67=138	−6
T6	(United States) Hale Irwin	70-68=138	−6

=== Third round ===
Saturday, February 28, 1976
Sunday, February 29, 1976

Place	Player	Score	To par
T1	(United States) Jack Nicklaus	66-70-68=204	−12
T1	(United States) J. C. Snead	67-69-68=204	−12
T3	(United States) Roger Maltbie	70-70-65=205	−11
T3	(United States) Mark Hayes	71-67-67=205	−11
5	(United States) Tom Watson	67-70-70=207	−9
T6	(United States) Hale Irwin	70-68-70=208	−8
T6	(United States) Don January	67-68-73=208	−8
8	(United States) Jim Masserio	69-68-72=209	−7
T9	(United States) Butch Baird	71-67-72=210	−6
T9	(United States) Bob Payne	69-70-71=210	−6

=== Final round ===
Monday, March 1, 1976

Place	Player	Score	To par	Money ($)
1	(United States) Jack Nicklaus	66-70-68-65=269	−19	60,000
2	(United States) J. C. Snead	67-69-68-68=272	−16	34,200
T3	(United States) Roger Maltbie	70-70-65-71=276	−12	17,700
T3	(United States) Jim Masserio	69-68-72-67=276	−12	17,700
5	(United States) Mark Hayes	71-67-67-72=277	−11	12,300
6	(United States) Lee Elder	69-72-70-67=278	−10	10,800
T7	(United States) Butch Baird	71-67-72-70=280	−8	9,225
T7	(United States) Don January	67-68-73-72=280	−8	9,225
T9	(Australia) David Graham	70-71-71-69=281	−7	7,500
T9	(South Africa) Gary Player	73-70-71-67=281	−7	7,500
T9	(United States) Tom Watson	67-70-70-74=281	−7	7,500
