= Inverrary Country Club =

Private golf club in Lauderhill, Florida

- Location within the United States Location within Florida
- 26.173°N 80.236°W

Club information
- Location: Lauderhill, Florida, U.S.
- Elevation: 7 feet (2 m)
- Established: 1970; 56 years ago
- Type: Private
- Total holes: 36
- Tournaments: Inverrary Classic (1972–1983); Tournament Players; Championship (1976); The Phar-Mor at Inverrary (1990–1992)

East
- Designed by: Robert Trent Jones, Sr.
- Par: 72
- Length: 7,112 yards (6,503 m)
- Course rating: 75.0
- Slope rating: 139

West
- Designed by: Robert Trent Jones, Sr.
- Par: 71
- Length: 6,675 yards (6,104 m)
- Course rating: 72.5
- Slope rating: 131

Inverrary Country Club was a 36-hole private golf club located in Lauderhill, Florida, northwest of Fort Lauderdale. Founded 56 years ago in 1970, both 18-hole courses were designed by Robert Trent Jones Sr. The course has been shut down since 2020.

== Tour events ==
Inverrary East Course hosted a late winter PGA Tour event for a decade beginning in 1972. The tour event was hosted by entertainer Jackie Gleason in the 1970s, and is now the Cognizant Classic.

The East Course was also the site of the Tournament Players Championship in 1976. That TPC event was won by Jack Nicklaus, and Nicklaus also won the next two Gleason events, for wins in three consecutive years at the course.

In the early 1990s on the LPGA Tour, it was the site of The Phar-Mor at Inverrary.
