= Jane Crafter =

Australian-American professional golfer and golf broadcaster (born 1955)

Personal information
- Nationality: Australia
- Born: 14 December 1955 (age 70) Perth, Western Australia
- Height: 5 ft 4 in (1.63 m)
- Life partner: Sandra Herr

Career
- Sport: Golf
- College: South Australian Institute of Technology
- Turned professional: 1980
- Former tours: LPGA Tour (1981–2004); ALPG Tour; Legends Tour
- Professional wins: 6

Number of wins by tour
- LPGA Tour: 1
- WPGA Tour of Australasia: 3
- Other: 2

Best results in LPGA major championships
- Chevron Championship: T8: 1984, 1993
- Women's PGA C'ship: T3: 1996
- U.S. Women's Open: T40: 1983, 1986
- du Maurier Classic: T13: 2000
- Women's British Open: DNP

Jane Crafter (born 14 December 1955) is an Australian professional golfer.

== Early life ==
Crafter comes from a golfing family. Her father Brian Crafter was a professional golfer, while her brother Neil was a leading amateur golfer, representing Australia in the 1984 Eisenhower Trophy. Her uncle, Murray Crafter, was a professional golfer as well.

Before playing professional golf, Crafter worked as a pharmacist for three years.

== Professional career ==
Crafter won once on the LPGA Tour in 1990. She won three times on the ALPG Tour.

Crafter has worked as a golf broadcaster for ESPN.

== Personal life ==
She has had dual citizenship in Australia and the United States since 2007.

== Professional wins (6) ==
=== LPGA Tour wins (1) ===
No.	Date	Tournament	Winning score	Margin of victory	Runner-up
1	18 Feb 1990	The Phar-Mor at Inverrary	−7 (70-67-72=209)	1 stroke	(United States) Nancy Lopez

LPGA Tour playoff record (0–1)

No.	Year	Tournament	Opponent	Result
1	1992	Ping-Cellular One LPGA Golf Championship	(United States) Nancy Lopez	Lost to par on second extra hole

=== ALPG Tour wins (3) ===
- 1992 Alpine Australian Ladies Masters
- 1996 Alpine Australian Ladies Masters
- 1997 Toyota Women's Australian Open

=== Other wins (1) ===
- 1987 JCPenney Classic (with Steve Jones)

=== Legends Tour wins (1) ===
- 2013 Fry's Desert Golf Classic (with Betsy King)

== Team appearances ==
Amateur

- Commonwealth Trophy (representing Australia): 1979
- Tasman Cup (representing Australia): 1978 (tied)
- Queen Sirikit Cup (representing Australia): 1980

Professional

- Handa Cup (representing World team): 2010, 2012 (tie), 2013 (winners), 2014, 2015
