= 1974 Tournament Players Championship =

Tournament information
- Dates: August 29 – September 2, 1974
- Location: Marietta, Georgia, U.S. 33.940°N 84.426°W
- Course: Atlanta Country Club
- Tour: PGA Tour

Statistics
- Par: 72
- Length: 6,883 yards (6,294 m)
- Cut: 146 (+2)
- Prize fund: $250,000
- Winner's share: $50,000

Champion
- (United States) Jack Nicklaus
- 272 (−16)
- Location in the United States Location in Georgia

The 1974 Tournament Players Championship was a golf tournament in Georgia on the PGA Tour, held August 29 to September 2 at Atlanta Country Club in Marietta, a suburb northwest of Atlanta. This was the first Tournament Players Championship, and Jack Nicklaus won the first of his three TPC titles, two strokes ahead of runner-up J. C. Snead, the 54-hole leader.

The final round on Sunday was interrupted several times by weather and twelve players completed their rounds on Monday morning, Labor Day.

The year's concluding major, the PGA Championship, was played three weeks earlier in North Carolina and won by Lee Trevino, a stroke ahead of Nicklaus. Trevino opened with 69 at the TPC but finished twelve shots back, in eighteenth place.

== Venue ==
This was the only Tournament Players Championship held in Georgia; it went to Texas in 1975 and relocated to Florida in 1976. Except for this year, the Atlanta Country Club hosted the Atlanta Classic on the PGA Tour from 1967 through 1996.

== Round summaries ==
=== First round ===
Thursday, August 29, 1974
Friday, August 30, 1974

Place	Player	Score	To par
1	(United States) J. C. Snead	64	−8
T2	(United States) Tom Evans	65	−7
T2	(United States) Jerry Heard	65	−7
T4	(United States) Bobby Mitchell	66	−6
T4	(United States) Jack Nicklaus	66	−6
T6	(United States) Homero Blancas	67	−5
T6	(United States) Charles Coody	67	−5
T6	(United States) Lou Graham	67	−5
9	(Australia) David Graham	68	−4
T10	(United States) Tommy Aaron	69	−3
T10	(United States) Tim Collins	69	−3
T10	(Australia) Bruce Crampton	69	−3
T10	(United States) James Ferriell	69	−3
T10	(United States) Rod Funseth	69	−3
T10	(United States) Gibby Gilbert	69	−3
T10	(United States) Larry Hinson	69	−3
T10	(United States) Roy Pace	69	−3
T10	(United States) Tom Shaw	69	−3
T10	(United States) Bob E. Smith	69	−3
T10	(United States) Lee Trevino	69	−3

=== Second round ===
Friday, August 30, 1974

Place	Player	Score	To par
1	(United States) Lou Graham	67-67=134	−10
2	(United States) J. C. Snead	64-71=135	−9
3	(United States) Dave Hill	70-66=136	−8
T4	(Australia) Bruce Crampton	69-68=137	−7
T4	(United States) Hubert Green	70-67=137	−7
T4	(United States) Jack Nicklaus	66-71=137	−7
T7	(United States) Bud Allin	71-67=138	−6
T7	(United States) Homero Blancas	67-71=138	−6
T7	(United States) Charles Coody	67-71=138	−6
T7	(Australia) David Graham	68-70=138	−6
T7	(United States) Jerry Heard	65-73=138	−6

=== Third round ===
Saturday, August 31, 1974

Place	Player	Score	To par
1	(United States) J. C. Snead	64-71-67=202	−14
2	(United States) Jack Nicklaus	66-71-68=205	−11
T3	(United States) Homero Blancas	67-71-69=207	−9
T3	(United States) Lou Graham	67-67-73=207	−9
5	(United States) Dave Hill	70-66-72=208	−8
T6	(United States) Bud Allin	71-67-71=209	−7
T6	(United States) Charles Coody	67-71-71=209	−7
T6	(Australia) Bruce Crampton	69-68-72=209	−7
T6	(Australia) David Graham	68-70-71=209	−7
T6	(United States) Hubert Green	70-67-72=209	−7

=== Final round ===
Sunday, September 1, 1974
Monday, September 2, 1974

Place	Player	Score	To par	Money ($)
1	(United States) Jack Nicklaus	66-71-68-67=272	−16	50,000
2	(United States) J. C. Snead	64-71-67-72=274	−14	28,500
3	(Australia) Bruce Crampton	69-68-72-67=276	−12	17,750
4	(United States) Gene Littler	72-69-69-67=277	−11	11,750
5	(United States) Lou Graham	67-67-73-71=278	−10	10,250
T6	(United States) Hubert Green	70-67-72-70=279	−9	8,500
T6	(United States) Bob Murphy	71-71-69-68=279	−9	8,500
8	(United States) Dave Hill	70-66-72-72=280	−8	7,375
T9	(United States) Bud Allin	71-67-71-72=281	−7	6,250
T9	(United States) Charles Coody	67-71-71-72=281	−7	6,250
T9	(United States) Eddie Pearce	73-67-69-72=281	−7	6,250
