= TPC Sugarloaf =

Golf club in Georgia, US

- Location within the United States Location within Georgia
- 33.998°N 84.109°W

Club information
- Location: Sugarloaf Club Drive; Duluth, Georgia, U.S.
- Elevation: 1,000 feet (300 m)
- Established: 1997, 29 years ago
- Type: Private
- Operator: PGA Tour TPC Network
- Total holes: 27
- Tournaments: AT&T Classic (1997–2008); Mitsubishi Electric Classic (2013–)
- Greens: Bentgrass
- Fairways: Perrenial ryegrass
- Website: tpcsugarloaf.com

The Stables and The Meadows
- Designed by: Greg Norman
- Par: 72
- Length: 7,309 yards (6,683 m)
- Course rating: 75.8
- Slope rating: 146
- Course record: 63 – Tiger Woods, Phil Mickelson, Ben Crane

TPC Sugarloaf is a 27-hole private golf club in the southeastern United States, located within the gated community of Sugarloaf Country Club in Gwinnett County, Georgia, 30 miles northeast of Atlanta.

The facility consists of three 9-hole courses designed by Greg Norman, and is a member of the Tournament Players Club network operated by the PGA Tour. It was the home of the tour's annual AT&T Classic (formerly the BellSouth Classic) from 1997 until it ended in 2008. It began hosting the Mitsubishi Electric Classic (formerly the Greater Gwinnett Championship) on the PGA Tour Champions in 2013. In 2020, it held the LocaliQ Series Tour Championship, which served as the pandemic replacement for the PGA Tour Canada in the 2020 season.

The BellSouth/AT&T Classic was always played over the original two nines, The Stables and The Meadows, which opened the week before its first staging of the tournament in 1997. In 1998, the property was hit by a tornado which damaged many trees on the first and ninth holes, and destroyed some of the corporate tent structures around the 18th green. The third nine, The Pines, opened in 2000.

The land was formerly the O. Wayne Rollins family farm, where they kept pure-bred cattle and horses.
