= Atlanta Classic =

Golf tournament on the PGA Tour

Coordinates: 33.998°N 84.109°W

AT&T Classic

Tournament information
- Location: Duluth, Georgia
- Established: 1934
- Course: TPC Sugarloaf
- Par: 72
- Length: 7,179 yards (6,564 m)
- Tour: PGA Tour
- Format: Stroke play
- Prize fund: US$5,500,000
- Month played: May
- Final year: 2008

Tournament record score
- Aggregate: 260 Phil Mickelson (2006)
- To par: −28 as above

Final champion
- (Japan) Ryuji Imada
- Location in the United States Location in Georgia

The Atlanta Classic was a golf tournament on the PGA Tour, a regular stop in suburban Atlanta for over four decades. It was founded in 1967, although previous events dating to 1934 are included in the PGA Tour's past winners list. AT&T was the last title sponsor of the tournament.

From 1967 to 1996, it was played at the Atlanta Country Club in Marietta, northwest of Atlanta. From 1997 to 2008, it was played over the Stables and Meadows nines at TPC at Sugarloaf in Duluth, northeast of Atlanta.

For most of its years, the Atlanta tournament was usually held in May. From 1999 to 2006, it was moved to early April, the week before the Masters. Its final two editions were in mid-May, a week after the Players Championship (which was moved from late March). The tournament was cancelled after the 2008 season.

This event is not to be confused with the AT&T Champions Classic played in Valencia, California, a Champions Tour (now PGA Tour Champions) tournament which bore the "AT&T Classic" name in 2006, prior to AT&T's acquisition of BellSouth. It was cancelled after the 2009 season.

TPC Sugarloaf currently hosts an annual PGA Tour Champions event, the Mitsubishi Electric Classic, which debuted in 2013.

== Tournament highlights ==
- 1967: Bob Charles wins the first modern era PGA Tour event played in Atlanta. He finishes two shots ahead of Gardner Dickinson, Tommy Bolt, and Richard Crawford.
- 1968; Bob Lunn is victorious for the second straight week on the PGA Tour. He wins by three shots over Lee Trevino.
- 1970: Georgia native Tommy Aaron wins by one shot over Dan Sikes. Tom Weiskopf came to the 72nd hole tied with Aaron but closed with a double bogey.
- 1972: Bob Lunn becomes the tournament's first repeat winner. He beats Gary Player by two shots.
- 1977: Hale Irwin becomes the first Atlanta champion to successfully defend his title. He beats Steve Veriato by two shots.
- 1979: Andy Bean shoots a third round 61 on his way to an 8-stroke victory over Joe Inman.
- 1980: Georgian Larry Nelson wins by seven shots over Don Pooley and defending champion Andy Bean.
- 1983: Calvin Peete shoots a final round 63, including a hole out for birdie from a bunker on the 71st hole. He wins by two shots over Chip Beck, Jim Colbert, and Don Pooley.
- 1986: Bob Tway shoots a final round 64 to win by two shots over Hal Sutton.
- 1988: Larry Nelson birdies the 72nd hole to become a two-time winner of the tournament. He edges Chip Beck by one shot.
- 1990: Wayne Levi birdies the 72nd hole in near darkness to earn his first PGA Tour win in five years. He finishes one shot ahead of Nick Price, Keith Clearwater, and Larry Mize.
- 1992: Tom Kite begins the final round bogey-bogey before making six consecutive birdies on his way to a three shot victory over Jay Don Blake. Amateur David Duval, a junior at Georgia Tech held the 54 hole lead by two strokes before shooting a final round 79 to finish T13.
- 1994: John Daly wins by one shot over Brian Henninger and defending champion Nolan Henke. Afterwards Daly says "This is the first tournament I've won on the PGA Tour in a sober fashion."
- 1996: Sixth alternate Paul Stankowski birdies the first sudden death playoff hole to defeat Brandel Chamblee.
- 1998: Tiger Woods notches his only victory of the year in Atlanta. He finishes one shot ahead of Jay Don Blake.
- 2000: Phil Mickelson wins for the first time in Atlanta. He birdies the first hole of a sudden death playoff to defeat Gary Nicklaus.
- 2003: Ben Crane shoots a final round 63 to win by four shots over Bob Tway.
- 2006: Mickelson dominates the field, using two drivers in preparation for the Masters the following week. He concluded with an eagle on the 72nd hole to post a score of 28-under-par, a career best. Mickelson won by 13 strokes over José María Olazábal and Zach Johnson, and would go on to win the Masters the next week.
- 2007: Zach Johnson seems to like playing golf in Georgia. His third career PGA Tour victory like his first two, the 2004 BellSouth Classic and the 2007 Masters Tournament take place in the state. He defeats Ryuji Imada on the first hole of a sudden death playoff.
- 2008: The last version of the tournament sees Ryuji Imada win in a sudden death playoff over Kenny Perry.

== Winners ==
| Year | Winner | Score | To par | Margin of victory | Runner(s)-up | Winner's share ($) |
AT&T Classic
| 2008 | (Japan) Ryuji Imada | 273 | −15 | Playoff | (United States) Kenny Perry | 990,000 |
| 2007 | (United States) Zach Johnson (2) | 273 | −15 | Playoff | (Japan) Ryuji Imada | 972,000 |
BellSouth Classic
| 2006 | (United States) Phil Mickelson (3) | 260 | −28 | 13 strokes | (United States) Zach Johnson (Spain) José María Olazábal | 954,000 |
| 2005 | (United States) Phil Mickelson (2) | 208 | −8 | Playoff | (India) Arjun Atwal (United States) Rich Beem (United States) Brandt Jobe (Spain) José María Olazábal | 900,000 |
| 2004 | (United States) Zach Johnson | 275 | −13 | 1 stroke | (Australia) Mark Hensby | 810,000 |
| 2003 | (United States) Ben Crane | 272 | −16 | 4 strokes | (United States) Bob Tway | 720,000 |
| 2002 | (South Africa) Retief Goosen | 272 | −16 | 4 strokes | (Sweden) Jesper Parnevik | 684,000 |
| 2001 | (United States) Scott McCarron (2) | 280 | −8 | 3 strokes | (Canada) Mike Weir | 594,000 |
| 2000 | (United States) Phil Mickelson | 205 | −11 | Playoff | (United States) Gary Nicklaus | 504,000 |
| 1999 | (United States) David Duval | 270 | −18 | 2 strokes | (United States) Stewart Cink | 450,000 |
| 1998 | (United States) Tiger Woods | 271 | −17 | 1 stroke | (United States) Jay Don Blake | 324,000 |
| 1997 | (United States) Scott McCarron | 274 | −14 | 3 strokes | (United States) David Duval (United States) Brian Henninger (United States) Lee Janzen | 270,000 |
| 1996 | (United States) Paul Stankowski | 280 | −8 | Playoff | (United States) Brandel Chamblee | 234,000 |
| 1995 | (United States) Mark Calcavecchia | 271 | −17 | 2 strokes | (United States) Jim Gallagher Jr. | 234,000 |
| 1994 | (United States) John Daly | 274 | −14 | 1 stroke | (United States) Nolan Henke (United States) Brian Henninger | 216,000 |
| 1993 | (United States) Nolan Henke | 271 | −17 | 2 strokes | (United States) Mark Calcavecchia (Zimbabwe) Nick Price (United States) Tom Sieckmann | 216,000 |
| 1992 | (United States) Tom Kite (2) | 272 | −16 | 3 strokes | (United States) Jay Don Blake | 180,000 |
BellSouth Atlanta Golf Classic
| 1991 | (United States) Corey Pavin | 272 | −16 | Playoff | (United States) Steve Pate | 180,000 |
| 1990 | (United States) Wayne Levi (2) | 275 | −13 | 1 stroke | (United States) Keith Clearwater (United States) Larry Mize (Zimbabwe) Nick Price | 180,000 |
| 1989 | (United States) Scott Simpson | 278 | −10 | Playoff | (United States) Bob Tway | 162,000 |
Georgia-Pacific Atlanta Golf Classic
| 1988 | (United States) Larry Nelson (2) | 268 | −20 | 1 stroke | (United States) Chip Beck | 126,000 |
| 1987 | (Canada) Dave Barr | 265 | −23 | 4 strokes | (United States) Larry Mize | 108,000 |
| 1986 | (United States) Bob Tway | 269 | −19 | 2 strokes | (United States) Hal Sutton | 90,000 |
| 1985 | (United States) Wayne Levi | 273 | −15 | Playoff | (United States) Steve Pate | 90,000 |
| 1984 | (United States) Tom Kite | 269 | −19 | 5 strokes | (United States) Don Pooley | 72,000 |
| 1983 | (United States) Calvin Peete | 206 | −10 | 2 strokes | (United States) Chip Beck (United States) Jim Colbert (United States) Don Pooley | 72,000 |
| 1982 | (United States) Keith Fergus | 273 | −15 | Playoff | (United States) Raymond Floyd | 54,000 |
Atlanta Classic
| 1981 | (United States) Tom Watson | 277 | −11 | Playoff | (United States) Tommy Valentine | 54,000 |
| 1980 | (United States) Larry Nelson | 270 | −18 | 7 strokes | (United States) Andy Bean (United States) Don Pooley | 54,000 |
| 1979 | (United States) Andy Bean | 265 | −23 | 8 strokes | (United States) Joe Inman | 54,000 |
| 1978 | (United States) Jerry Heard | 269 | −19 | 2 strokes | (United States) Lou Graham (United States) Bob Murphy (United States) Tom Watson | 40,000 |
| 1977 | (United States) Hale Irwin (2) | 273 | −15 | 1 stroke | (United States) Steve Veriato | 40,000 |
1976: No tournament
| 1975 | (United States) Hale Irwin | 271 | −17 | 4 strokes | (United States) Tom Watson | 45,000 |
1974: Atlanta Country Club hosted the Tournament Players Championship
| 1973 | (United States) Jack Nicklaus | 272 | −16 | 2 strokes | (United States) Tom Weiskopf | 30,000 |
| 1972 | (United States) Bob Lunn (2) | 275 | −13 | 2 strokes | (South Africa) Gary Player | 26,000 |
| 1971 | (United States) Gardner Dickinson | 275 | −13 | Playoff | (United States) Jack Nicklaus | 25,000 |
| 1970 | (United States) Tommy Aaron | 275 | −13 | 1 stroke | (United States) Dan Sikes | 25,000 |
| 1969 | (United States) Bert Yancey | 277 | −11 | Playoff | (Australia) Bruce Devlin | 23,000 |
| 1968 | (United States) Bob Lunn | 280 | −8 | 3 strokes | (United States) Lee Trevino | 23,000 |
| 1967 | (New Zealand) Bob Charles | 282 | −6 | 2 strokes | (United States) Tommy Bolt (United States) Richard Crawford (United States) Gardner Dickinson | 22,000 |
1948–1966: No tournament
Atlanta Open
| 1947 | (Italy) Toney Penna | 281 | −3 | 1 stroke | (United States) Jimmy Demaret | 2,000 |
Atlanta Invitational
| 1946 | (United States) Lew Worsham | 279 | −9 | 1 stroke | (United States) Jimmy Demaret | 2,200 |
Atlanta Open
| 1945 | (United States) Byron Nelson | 263 | −13 | 9 strokes | (United States) Sammy Byrd | 2,000 |
1935–1944: No tournament
| 1934 | (United States) Ky Laffoon | 286 | +6 | 6 strokes | (United States) Johnny Golden | 500 |
