= The Players Championship =

Annual golf tournament

Coordinates: 30.198°N 81.394°W

Tournament information
- Location: Ponte Vedra Beach, Florida
- Established: 1974
- Course: TPC at Sawgrass (Stadium Course)
- Par: 72
- Length: 7,189 yards (6,574 m)
- Tour: PGA Tour
- Format: Stroke play
- Prize fund: US$25,000,000
- Month played: March
- Website: theplayers.com

Tournament record score
- Aggregate: 264 Greg Norman (1994)
- To par: −24 as above

Current champion
- (United States) Cameron Young

Current tournament
- 2026 Players Championship

Location map
- Location in the United States Location in Florida

The Players Championship (commonly known as simply The Players, stylized by the PGA Tour as THE PLAYERS Championship) is an annual golf tournament on the PGA Tour and is the tour's flagship event. Originally known as the Tournament Players Championship, it began in 1974. The Players Championship at one point offered the highest purse of any tournament in golf (from $12.5 million in 2019 up to $25 million in 2023). The field usually includes the top 50 players in the world rankings, but, unlike the major championships, it is owned by the PGA Tour and not an official event on other tours.

Despite not being a major, it has been promoted as such by the tour, dubbed the "fifth major", and is often regarded as the next most prestigious tournament in golf. This is because of the characteristics it shares with the majors, such as the high class field, challenging course conditions, and its large purse. It also has a renowned host course in Ponte Vedra Beach, Florida (the TPC at Sawgrass Stadium Course at which the tournament has been played since 1982, home of the iconic par-3 No. 17 "Island Green").

== Format ==
As of 2023, the victor receives $4.5 million, the winner's share (18%) of the largest purse in golf ($25 million), and receives 80 points towards his world ranking, the largest share aside from the majors, for which winners earn 100 points. For comparison, the winners of other leading tournaments receive between 65 and 70 points.

The winner also receives a five-year exemption on the PGA Tour (formerly ten years), a three-year invitation to the Masters Tournament, and three-year exemptions for the U.S. Open, The Open Championship, and the PGA Championship. The winner earns 750 FedEx Cup points, the same amount of points a winner earns in a major championship, if a PGA Tour member.

== Field ==
The field comprises 120 players who constitute:

1. Winners of PGA Tour events since last Players
2. Top 100 from previous season's FedEx Cup points list
3. Top 100 (medical)
4. Major champions from the past five years
5. Players Championship winners from the past five years
6. PGA Tour winners from the past year
7. World Golf Championship winners from the past three years
8. Memorial Tournament, Arnold Palmer Invitational and Genesis Invitational winners from the past three years
9. Top 50 from the Official World Golf Ranking the week prior to the event
10. Senior Players Championship champion from prior year
11. Korn Ferry Tour money leader from prior season
12. Money leader during the Korn Ferry Tour Finals, if not the regular-season money leader
13. Top 10 current year FedEx Cup points leaders
14. Remaining positions and alternates filled from the current season FedEx Cup standings

== History ==
The Players Championship was conceived by the PGA Tour commissioner Deane Beman; the inaugural event in 1974 was played at Atlanta Country Club in Marietta, Georgia, concluding on Labor Day weekend in early September. It moved to Texas in 1975, at the Colonial Country Club in Fort Worth in August, and then to south Florida in 1976 at Inverrary Country Club in Lauderhill, at its East Course in late February. In these first three years the event replaced existing events, the Atlanta Classic in 1974, the Colonial National Invitational in 1975 and the Jackie Gleason-Inverrary Classic in 1976, which each returned to the schedule the following year.

In 1976 the PGA Tour agreed a multi-year deal to play the event up the coast at Sawgrass Country Club in Ponte Vedra Beach in mid-March, beginning in 1977. Since 1982, it has been played across the road to the west, at the Stadium Course at TPC at Sawgrass. The word "Tournament" was dropped from the title following the 1987 event.

Following the 2006 event, the course underwent a major renovation, which received very positive reviews from the players in 2007. Included in the renovation was a new 77,000-square-foot (7,150 m^{2}) Mediterranean Revival-style clubhouse.

The 2020 Players Championship was cancelled due to the COVID-19 pandemic.

Seven players have won The Players and a major championship in the same calendar year: Jack Nicklaus (1978, Open), Hal Sutton (1983, PGA), Tiger Woods (2001, Masters), Martin Kaymer (2014, U.S. Open), Cameron Smith (2022, Open), Scottie Scheffler (2024, Masters) and Rory McIlroy (2025, Masters).

=== Move to May ===
For the first thirty years at Ponte Vedra Beach, the championship was played in mid- to late March, several weeks before The Masters. (Three weeks prior for the first six seasons (1977–1982), then two weeks prior in 1983.) It was moved to May in 2007, to the weekend including the second Saturday, as part of a restructuring of the PGA Tour. This restructuring involved the introduction of the lucrative FedEx Cup, which concludes with The Tour Championship. The change gave the PGA Tour a marquee event in six consecutive months (The Masters in April, The Players in May, the U.S. Open in June, The Open Championship in July, the PGA Championship in August, and the Tour Championship in September).

With the rearrangement of 2007, the final round of The Players Championship was usually on the second Sunday of May, Mother's Day in the United States. To mark this, most players wore pink shirts or accessories on Sunday, and many in the galleries also joined them in donning pink garb. (The two exceptions were in 2011 and 2016, when the final round was on Sunday, May 15.)

In August 2017, it was announced that The Players would return to March beginning in 2019, due to a realignment of the golf season that moves the PGA Championship from August to May.

=== Playoffs ===
The playoff format was sudden-death through 2013, lately starting at the par-3 17th hole. The format was changed to a three-hole aggregate in 2014, similar to the PGA Championship, played over the final three holes, in order. If still tied, the playoff goes to sudden-death on the same three holes, but starts at the 17th.

The only playoff prior to the Stadium Course was in 1981. Since moving to the Stadium Course in 1982, there has been a playoff on five occasions (1987, 2008, 2011, 2015, 2025). The 1987 playoff started at the par-5 16th and went to a third extra hole at the par-4 18th, with three pars by the winner; the next two were won with pars at the first extra hole (17). The 2015 playoff was the first for the three-hole aggregate; it went to sudden-death and became the first to be won with a birdie.

== Venues ==
Years	Events	Venue	City	State
1982–2026	44	TPC Sawgrass, Stadium Course	Ponte Vedra; Beach	Florida
1977–1981	5	Sawgrass Country Club	Ponte Vedra; Beach	Florida
1976	1	Inverrary Country Club, East Course	Lauderhill	Florida
1975	1	Colonial Country Club	Fort Worth	Texas
1974	1	Atlanta Country Club	Marietta	Georgia

=== Course lengths ===
Years	Events	Length	Venue
2017–2022	6	7,189 yards (6,574 m)	TPC Sawgrass; Stadium; Course
2007–2016	10	7,215 yards (6,597 m)	TPC Sawgrass; Stadium; Course
2006	1	7,098 yards (6,490 m)	TPC Sawgrass; Stadium; Course
1999–2005	7	7,093 yards (6,486 m)	TPC Sawgrass; Stadium; Course
1998	1	6,950 yards (6,355 m)	TPC Sawgrass; Stadium; Course
1990–1997	8	6,896 yards (6,306 m)	TPC Sawgrass; Stadium; Course
1982–1989	8	6,857 yards (6,270 m)	TPC Sawgrass; Stadium; Course
1980–1981	2	7,000 yards (6,400 m)	Sawgrass CC
1979	1	7,083 yards (6,477 m)	Sawgrass CC
1977–1978	2	7,174 yards (6,560 m)	Sawgrass CC
1976	1	7,128 yards (6,518 m)	Inverrary CC
1975	1	7,190 yards (6,575 m)	Colonial CC
1974	1	6,883 yards (6,294 m)	Atlanta CC

- Par 72, except for 1975 (par 70)

== Winners ==
Year	Winner	Score	To par	Margin of victory	Runner(s)-up	Purse (US$)	Winner's share ($)
The Players Championship
2026	(United States) Cameron Young	275	−13	1 stroke	(England) Matt Fitzpatrick	25,000,000	4,500,000
2025	(Northern Ireland) Rory McIlroy (2)	276	−12	Playoff	(United States) J. J. Spaun	25,000,000	4,500,000
2024	(United States) Scottie Scheffler (2)	268	−20	1 stroke	(United States) Wyndham Clark (United States) Brian Harman (United States) Xander Schauffele	25,000,000	4,500,000
2023	(United States) Scottie Scheffler	271	−17	5 strokes	(England) Tyrrell Hatton	25,000,000	4,500,000
2022	(Australia) Cameron Smith	275	−13	1 stroke	(India) Anirban Lahiri	20,000,000	3,600,000
2021	(United States) Justin Thomas	274	−14	1 stroke	(England) Lee Westwood	15,000,000	2,700,000
2020	Canceled after the first round due to the COVID-19 pandemic					15,000,000	2,700,000
2019	(Northern Ireland) Rory McIlroy	272	−16	1 stroke	(United States) Jim Furyk	12,500,000	2,250,000
2018	(United States) Webb Simpson	270	−18	4 strokes	(United States) Xander Schauffele (South Africa) Charl Schwartzel (United States) Jimmy Walker	11,000,000	1,980,000
2017	(South Korea) Kim Si-woo	278	−10	3 strokes	(South Africa) Louis Oosthuizen (England) Ian Poulter	10,500,000	1,890,000
2016	(Australia) Jason Day	273	−15	4 strokes	(United States) Kevin Chappell	10,500,000	1,890,000
2015	(United States) Rickie Fowler	276	−12	Playoff	(Spain) Sergio García (United States) Kevin Kisner	10,000,000	1,800,000
2014	(Germany) Martin Kaymer	275	−13	1 stroke	(United States) Jim Furyk	10,000,000	1,800,000
2013	(United States) Tiger Woods (2)	275	−13	2 strokes	(Sweden) David Lingmerth (United States) Jeff Maggert (United States) Kevin Streelman	9,500,000	1,710,000
2012	(United States) Matt Kuchar	275	−13	2 strokes	(United States) Ben Curtis (United States) Rickie Fowler (United States) Zach Johnson (Scotland) Martin Laird	9,500,000	1,710,000
2011	(South Korea) K. J. Choi	275	−13	Playoff	(United States) David Toms	9,500,000	1,710,000
2010	(South Africa) Tim Clark	272	−16	1 stroke	(Australia) Robert Allenby	9,500,000	1,710,000
2009	(Sweden) Henrik Stenson	276	−12	4 strokes	(England) Ian Poulter	9,500,000	1,710,000
2008	(Spain) Sergio García	283	−5	Playoff	(United States) Paul Goydos	9,500,000	1,710,000
2007	(United States) Phil Mickelson	277	−11	2 strokes	(Spain) Sergio García	9,000,000	1,620,000
2006	(Canada) Stephen Ames	274	−14	6 strokes	(South Africa) Retief Goosen	8,000,000	1,440,000
2005	(United States) Fred Funk	279	−9	1 stroke	(England) Luke Donald (United States) Tom Lehman (United States) Scott Verplank	8,000,000	1,440,000
2004	(Australia) Adam Scott	276	−12	1 stroke	(Republic of Ireland) Pádraig Harrington	8,000,000	1,440,000
2003	(United States) Davis Love III (2)	271	−17	6 strokes	(United States) Jay Haas (Republic of Ireland) Pádraig Harrington	6,500,000	1,170,000
2002	(New Zealand) Craig Perks	280	−8	2 strokes	(Trinidad and Tobago) Stephen Ames	6,000,000	1,080,000
2001	(United States) Tiger Woods	274	−14	1 stroke	(Fiji) Vijay Singh	6,000,000	1,080,000
2000	(United States) Hal Sutton (2)	278	−10	1 stroke	(United States) Tiger Woods	6,000,000	1,080,000
1999	(United States) David Duval	285	−3	2 strokes	(United States) Scott Gump	5,000,000	900,000
1998	(United States) Justin Leonard	278	−10	2 strokes	(United States) Glen Day (United States) Tom Lehman	4,000,000	720,000
1997	(Australia) Steve Elkington (2)	272	−16	7 strokes	(United States) Scott Hoch	3,500,000	630,000
1996	(United States) Fred Couples (2)	270	−18	4 strokes	(Scotland) Colin Montgomerie (United States) Tommy Tolles	3,500,000	630,000
1995	(United States) Lee Janzen	283	−5	1 stroke	(Germany) Bernhard Langer	3,000,000	540,000
1994	(Australia) Greg Norman	264	−24	4 strokes	(United States) Fuzzy Zoeller	2,500,000	450,000
1993	(Zimbabwe) Nick Price	270	−18	5 strokes	(Germany) Bernhard Langer	2,500,000	450,000
1992	(United States) Davis Love III	273	−15	4 strokes	(Australia) Ian Baker-Finch (United States) Phil Blackmar (England) Nick Faldo (United States) Tom Watson	1,800,000	324,000
1991	(Australia) Steve Elkington	276	−12	1 stroke	(United States) Fuzzy Zoeller	1,600,000	288,000
1990	(United States) Jodie Mudd	278	−10	1 stroke	(United States) Mark Calcavecchia	1,500,000	270,000
1989	(United States) Tom Kite	279	−9	1 stroke	(United States) Chip Beck	1,350,000	243,000
1988	(United States) Mark McCumber	273	−15	4 strokes	(United States) Mike Reid	1,250,000	225,000
Tournament Players Championship
1987	(Scotland) Sandy Lyle	274	−14	Playoff	(United States) Jeff Sluman	1,000,000	180,000
1986	(United States) John Mahaffey	275	−13	1 stroke	(United States) Larry Mize	900,000	162,000
1985	(United States) Calvin Peete	274	−14	3 strokes	(United States) D. A. Weibring	900,000	162,000
1984	(United States) Fred Couples	277	−11	1 stroke	(United States) Lee Trevino	800,000	144,000
1983	(United States) Hal Sutton	283	−5	1 stroke	(United States) Bob Eastwood	700,000	126,000
1982	(United States) Jerry Pate	280	−8	2 strokes	(United States) Brad Bryant (United States) Scott Simpson	500,000	90,000
1981	(United States) Raymond Floyd	285	−3	Playoff	(United States) Barry Jaeckel (United States) Curtis Strange	440,000	72,000
1980	(United States) Lee Trevino	278	−10	1 stroke	(United States) Ben Crenshaw	440,000	72,000
1979	(United States) Lanny Wadkins	283	−5	5 strokes	(United States) Tom Watson	440,000	72,000
1978	(United States) Jack Nicklaus (3)	289	+1	1 stroke	(United States) Lou Graham	300,000	60,000
1977	(United States) Mark Hayes	289	+1	2 strokes	(United States) Mike McCullough	300,000	60,000
1976	(United States) Jack Nicklaus (2)	269	−19	3 strokes	(United States) J. C. Snead	300,000	60,000
1975	(United States) Al Geiberger	270	−10	3 strokes	(United States) Dave Stockton	250,000	50,000
1974	(United States) Jack Nicklaus	272	−16	2 strokes	(United States) J. C. Snead	250,000	50,000

Note: Green highlight indicates scoring records.

=== Multiple winners ===
Jack Nicklaus has the most wins, having won three of the first five events, in alternating years and on different courses. Since Players Championship moved to TPC Sawgrass in 1982, a further seven players have won twice, with Scottie Scheffler being the only player to successfully defend the title. Additionally, Nickaus, McIlroy, and Scheffler are the only players to repeat as champion in less than 5 years (no 2020 tournament). In contrast to Scheffler, the 17 years between Hal Sutton's first and second titles is the longest period between wins in the competitions history, while Couples and Woods each waited 12 years, and Love III had an 11 year pause between his two wins.

- 3 wins
  - Jack Nicklaus: 1974, 1976, 1978
- 2 wins
  - Fred Couples: 1984, 1996
  - Steve Elkington: 1991, 1997
  - Hal Sutton: 1983, 2000
  - Davis Love III: 1992, 2003
  - Tiger Woods: 2001, 2013
  - Scottie Scheffler: 2023, 2024
  - Rory McIlroy: 2019, 2025

== Tournament highlights ==
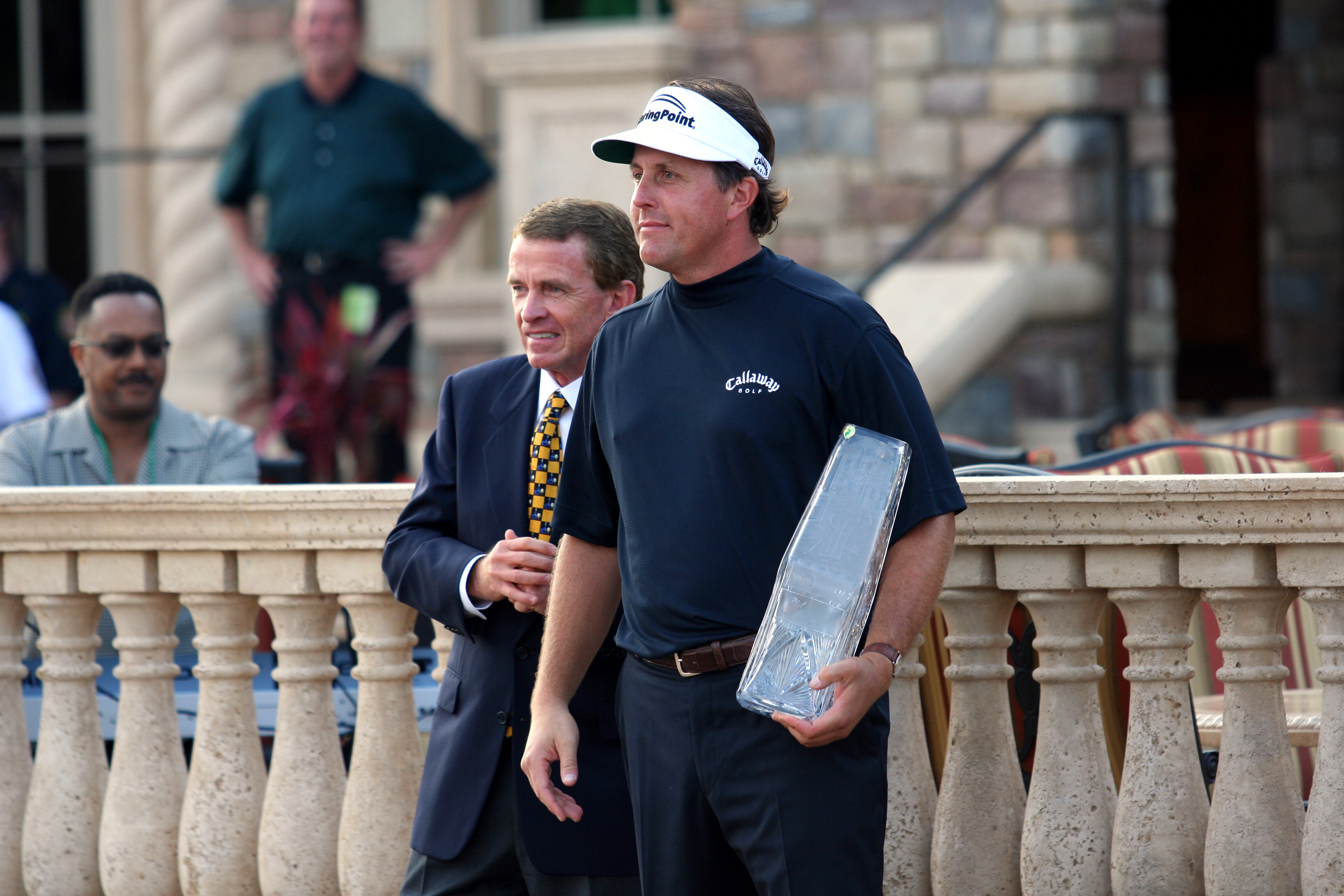
Phil Mickelson with the 2007 Players Championship trophy

- 1974: Jack Nicklaus wins the inaugural edition of the tournament. He beats J. C. Snead by two shots near Atlanta.
- 1977: Mark Hayes wins by two shots over Mike McCullough at Sawgrass Country Club, despite shooting the highest winning score on the PGA Tour, 289, since Nicklaus at the 1972 U.S. Open.
- 1978: Jack Nicklaus wins his third Tournament Players Championship title. He edges Lou Graham by one shot.
- 1979: Bob Murphy, a five-time winner on the PGA Tour, shoots a final round 92. Winds were gusting up to 45 miles per hour that day.
- 1980: Playing in a final threesome with Gary Player and Jack Nicklaus, Lee Trevino shoots a final round 70 to edge Ben Crenshaw by one shot.
- 1981: Raymond Floyd defeats Curtis Strange and Barry Jaeckel on the first hole of a sudden death playoff. In addition to the tournament title, Floyd collects an additional $250,000 bonus due to his win at the Doral-Eastern Open the week before.
- 1982: After winning the first tournament at the Stadium Course by two shots over Brad Bryant and Scott Simpson, Jerry Pate tosses PGA Tour Commissioner Deane Beman and course architect Pete Dye into the water adjacent to the 18th green before jumping in himself.
- 1983: Hal Sutton wins by one shot over Bob Eastwood. John Cook came to the 72nd hole tied for the lead with Sutton before hitting his tee shot in the water on his way to a double bogey.
- 1984: Fred Couples shoots a course record 64 during the second round of play on his way to a one-shot victory over Lee Trevino.
- 1986: John Mahaffey wins by one shot over Larry Mize after Mize makes bogey on four of the last five holes during the final round of play.
- 1987: Sandy Lyle defeats Jeff Sluman with a par on the third hole of a sudden-death playoff. At the playoff's second hole, Sluman stood over a 6-foot (1.8 m) birdie putt to win, and a spectator jumped into the water surrounding the 17th green. He backed away, then missed.
- 1988: Jacksonville area resident Mark McCumber wins by four shots over Mike Reid.
- 1989: Tom Kite wins for the second consecutive week. He beats Chip Beck by one shot.
- 1991: Steve Elkington wins by one shot over Fuzzy Zoeller. Phil Blackmar had solo possession of the lead before hitting his tee shot into the water on the 71st hole resulting in a double bogey.
- 1992: Mark Calcavecchia and John Daly, the first pair on the final day of the tournament, are reprimanded by Deputy PGA Tour Commissioner Tim Finchem "for failure to exert their best effort" after they finish their 18 holes of golf in only two hours and three minutes.
- 1994: Greg Norman shoots the 72-hole record score for the tournament, 264, on his way to a four shot victory over Fuzzy Zoeller.
- 1995: After Norman's record score, the course is made tougher by the creation of new, rock hard greens. Lee Janzen shoots 283 to win the tournament, the biggest one-year swing for a tournament played on the same layout in PGA Tour history.
- 1996: Twelve years after his first win at the TPC at Sawgrass, Fred Couples triumphs again. He shoots a final round 64 to beat Colin Montgomerie and Tommy Tolles by four shots.
- 1999: David Duval wins by two shots over Scott Gump. The win by Duval propels him to No. 1 in the World rankings.
- 2000: Hal Sutton wins at the TPC at Sawgrass for a second time. He edges Tiger Woods by one shot.
- 2002: Playing for the first time ever in The Players Championship, Craig Perks finishes eagle-birdie-par to win by two shots over Stephen Ames. It is the only PGA Tour win for Perks.
- 2003: Davis Love III wins The Players Championship for a second time. He shoots a final round 64 to win by six shots over Jay Haas and Pádraig Harrington.
- 2004: In spite of hitting his 2nd shot at the 72nd hole into the water, Adam Scott is able to get it up and down for bogey to win by one shot over Pádraig Harrington.
- 2005: Fred Funk becomes the tournament's oldest champion by edging Tom Lehman, Luke Donald, and Scott Verplank by one shot. During the final round, Bob Tway hits four balls into the water surrounding the 17th green, scoring a twelve on the hole.
- 2010: After 206 career PGA Tour starts, Tim Clark breaks through for his first Tour win.
- 2011: K. J. Choi becomes the first Asian born golfer to win The Players Championship. He defeats David Toms on the first hole of a sudden death playoff.
- 2013: Roberto Castro ties the course record with a 9-under 63 in the opening round. Sergio García, tied for the lead with Tiger Woods at 13-under par going to the par-3 17th hole in the final round, puts two balls into the water. Tiger Woods wins the event for the first time since 2001. It is his 78th career PGA Tour win in his 300th start.
- 2014: Ongoing injuries prevent Tiger Woods from defending his title. In the first round, Martin Kaymer ties the course record with a 63 matching Fred Couples (1992), Greg Norman (1994) and Roberto Castro (2013). Kaymer goes on to win wire-to-wire.
- 2015: The tournament's first aggregate three-hole playoff over holes 16–18 was won by Rickie Fowler, who defeated Kevin Kisner on the first hole of sudden-death after Sergio García had been eliminated.
- 2017: At just 21 years, 320 days old, Kim Si-woo becomes the event's youngest winner.
- 2020: The tournament was canceled due to the COVID-19 pandemic. The first round had been played. Hideki Matsuyama led, having tied the course record with a score of 63 (−9). Half of the $15 million purse was distributed to the players who played the first round, $52,000 each.
- 2024: Scottie Scheffler overcomes a five shot deficit heading into the final round to become the first back-to-back winner.
- 2025: Rory McIlroy wins his second Players Championship after defeating J. J. Spaun in a Monday three-hole aggregate playoff.

== Gallery ==
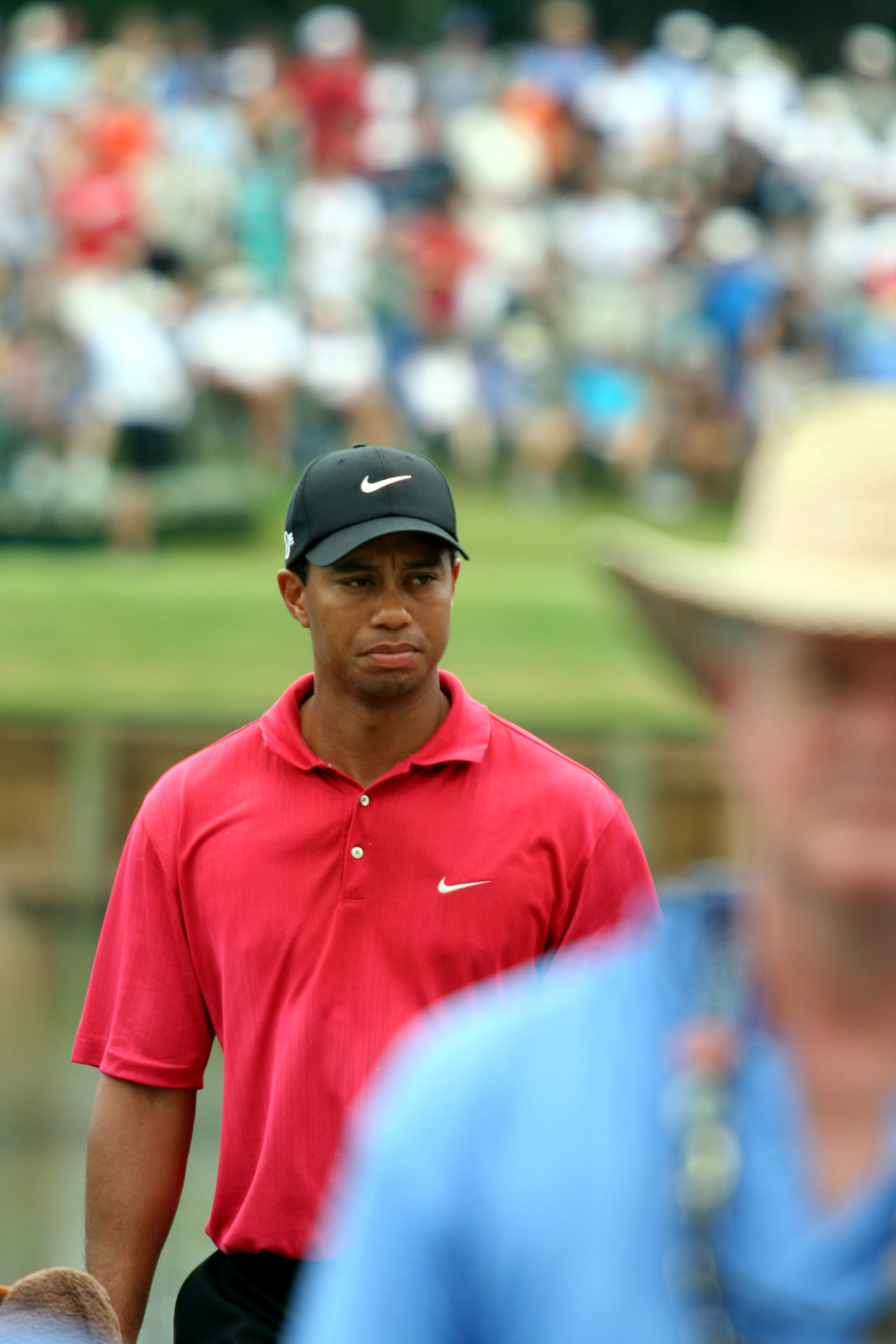
Tiger Woods at the 17th hole in the 2007 Players Championship.

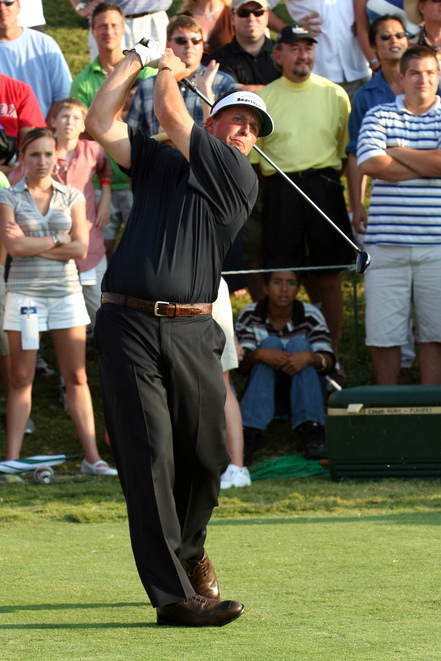
Phil Mickelson on the 18th hole in the 2007 Players Championship.

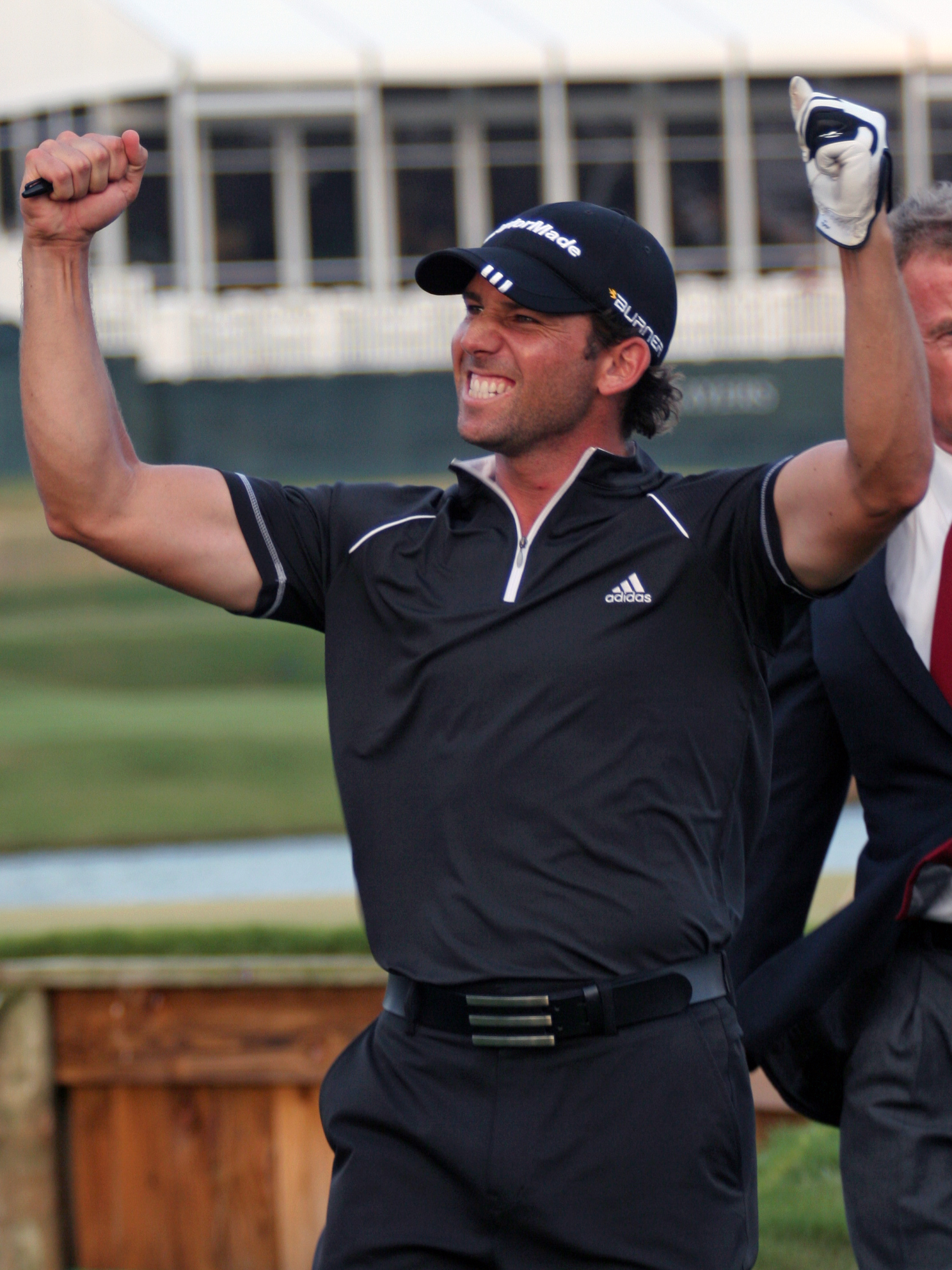
Sergio García winning the 2008 Players Championship.

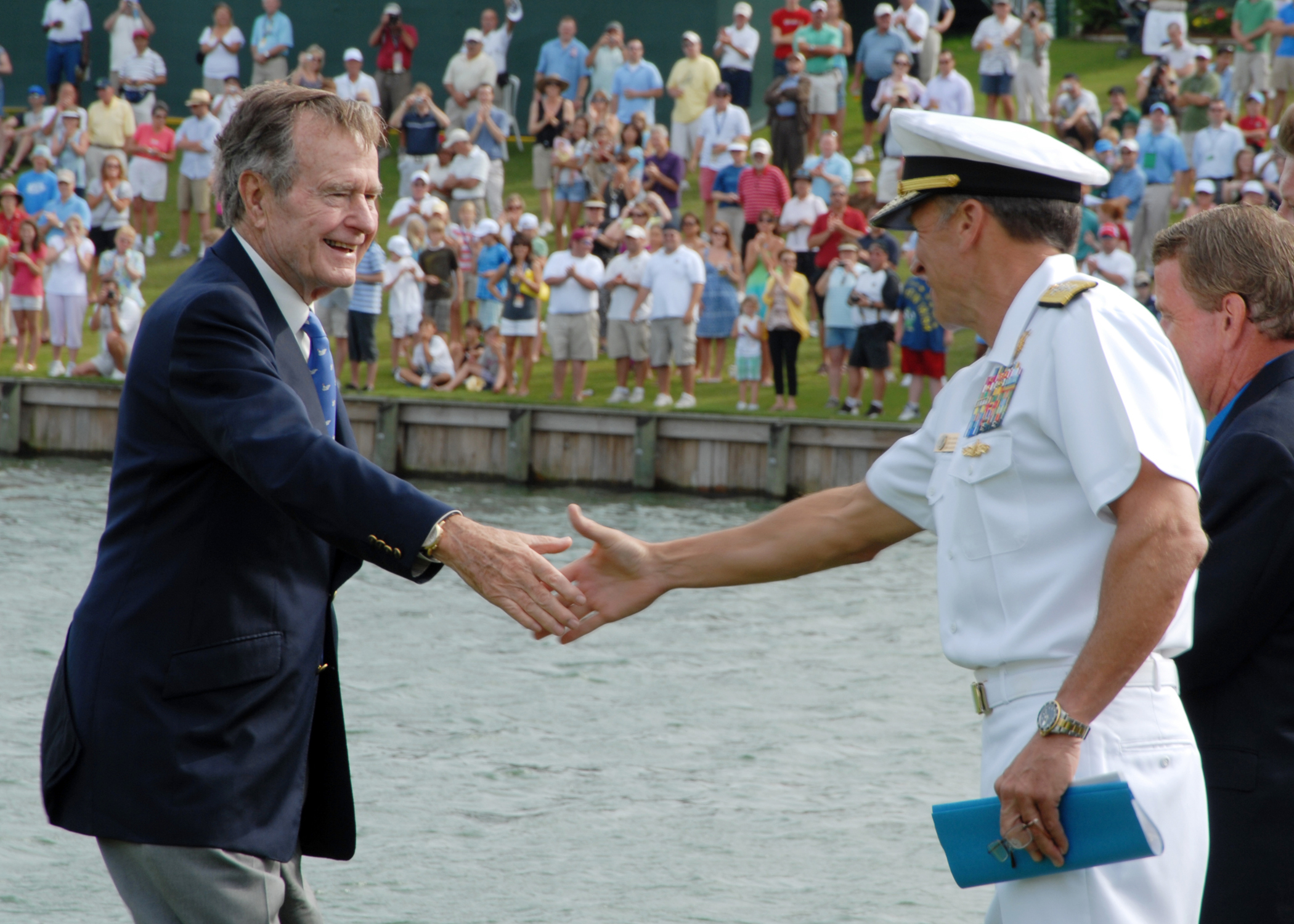
Former President George H. W. Bush shakes hands with Rear Adm. Joseph Kernan and then received the Professional Golfers Association Tour Lifetime Achievement Award.

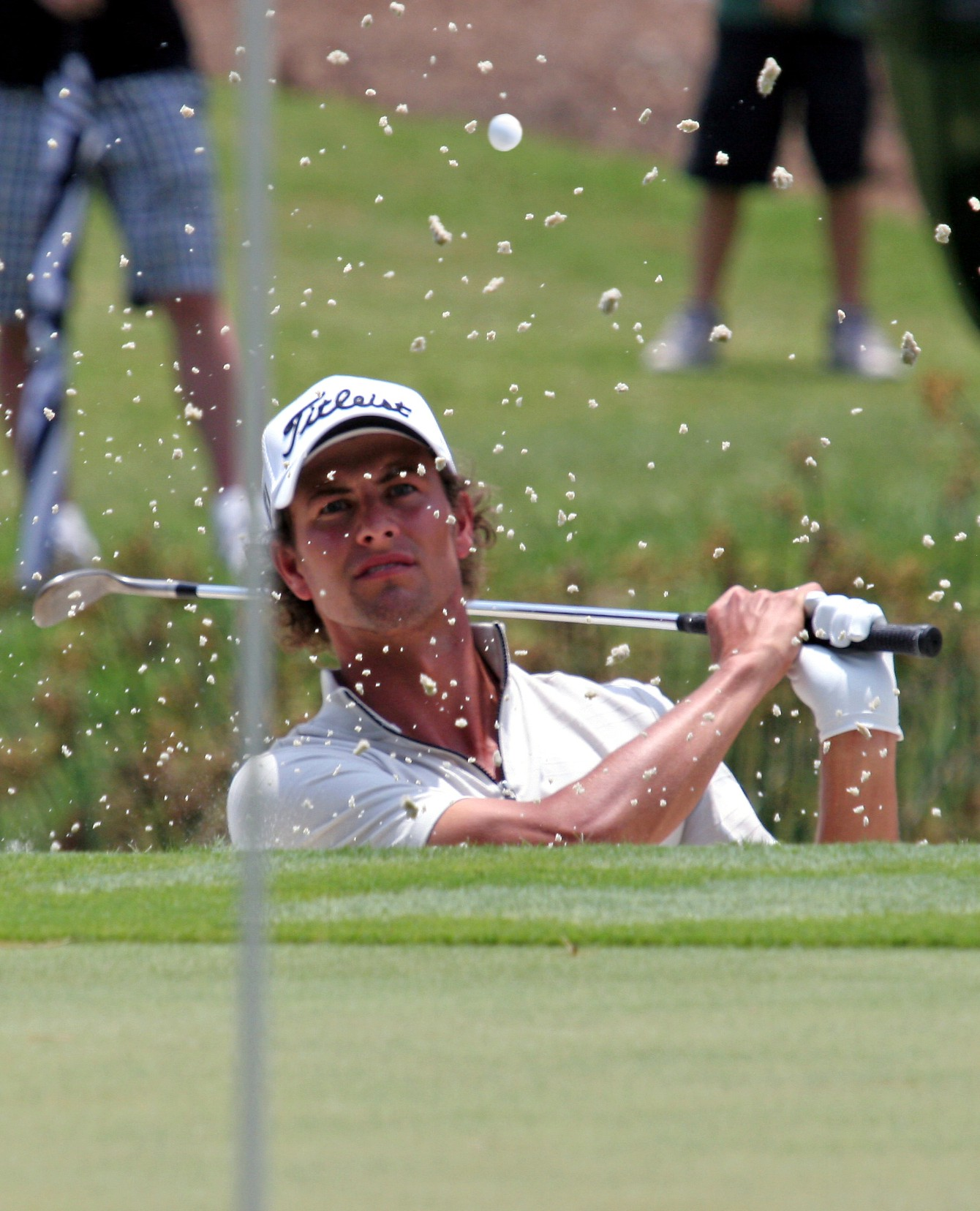
Adam Scott chips out of the bunker for par on #3 during the 2008 Players Championship.

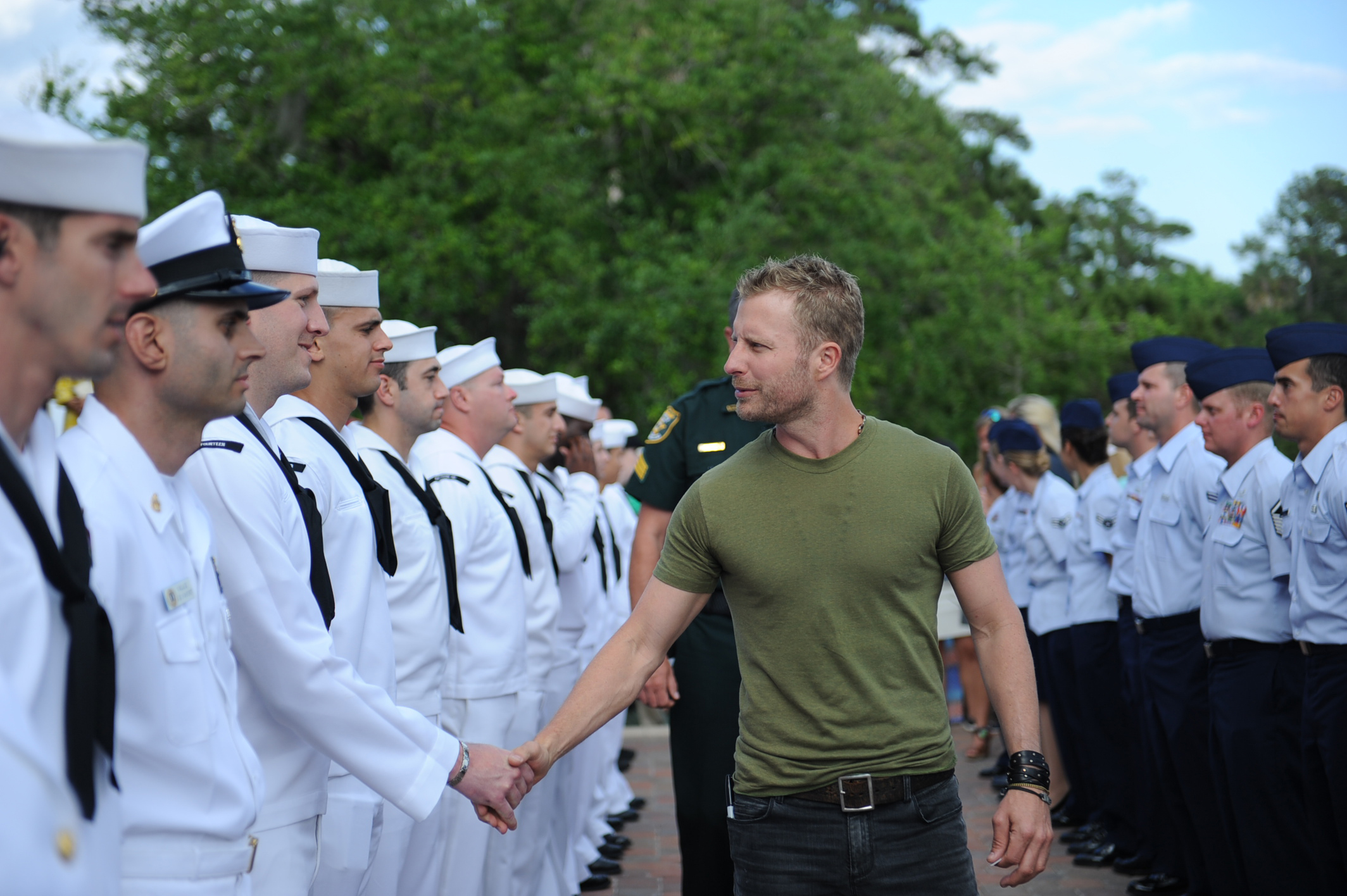
Dierks Bentley meets with service members at the 2013 Players Championship.
