= Lauderhill, Florida =

- City
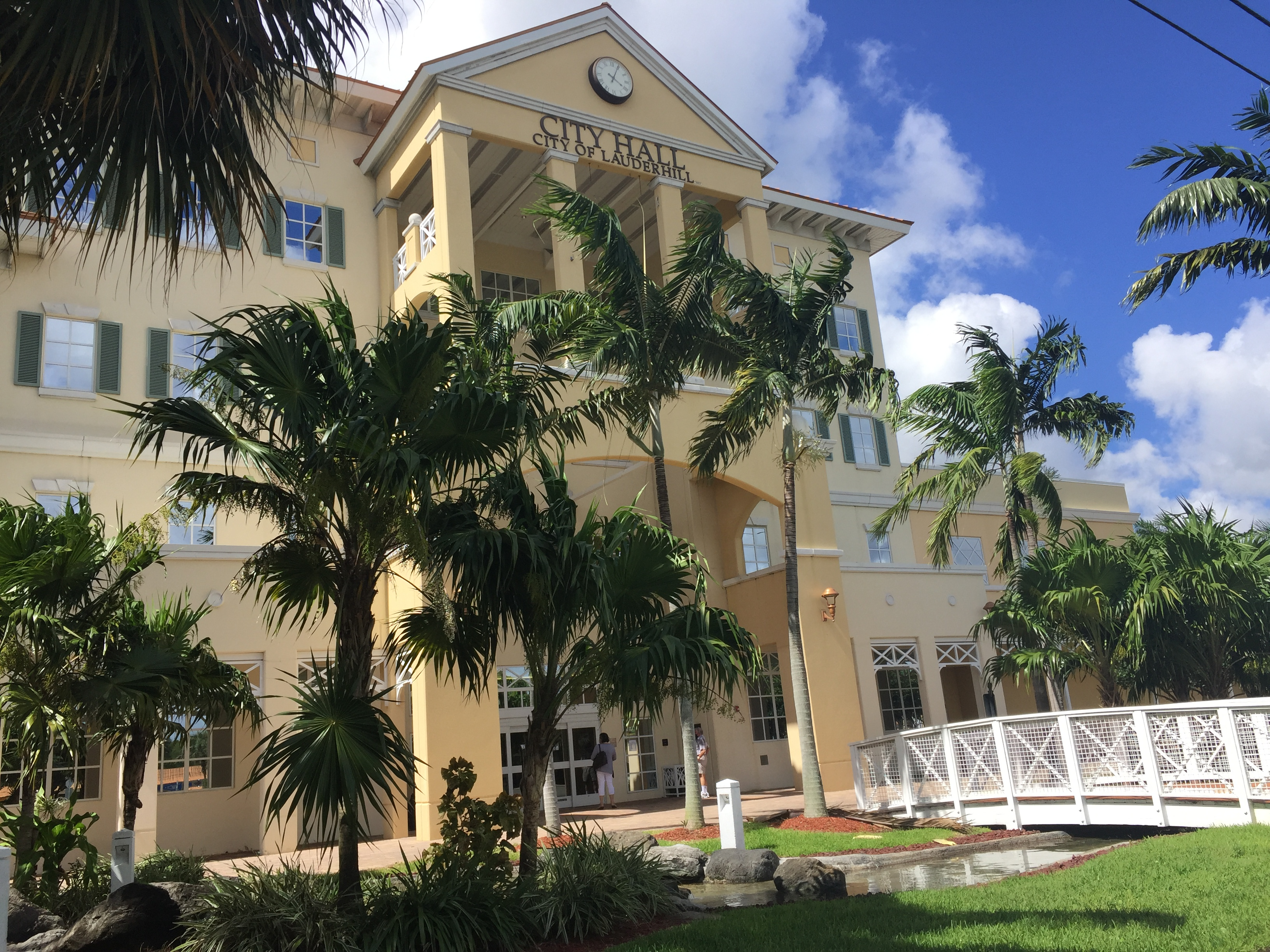
- Lauderhill City Hall

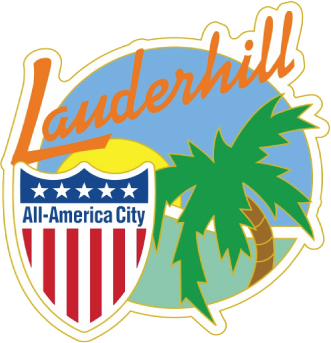
- Flag Seal
- Nickname: Jamaica Hill
- Motto: "All-America City!"
- Location of Lauderhill in Broward County, Florida
- Coordinates: 26°09′16″N 80°13′32″W
- Country: United States
- State: Florida
- County: Broward
- Incorporated: June 20, 1959

Government
  - Type: Commission-Manager

Area
  - City: 8.57 sq mi (22.19 km^{2})
  - Land: 8.52 sq mi (22.06 km^{2})
  - Water: 0.050 sq mi (0.13 km^{2})
- Elevation: 7 ft (2.1 m)

Population (2020)
  - City: 74,482
  - Density: 8,747/sq mi (3,377.1/km^{2})
  - Metro: 5,564,635
- Time zone: UTC-5 (Eastern (EST))
  - Summer (DST): UTC-4 (EDT)
- ZIP code(s): 33311, 33313, 33319, 33351
- Area codes: 954, 754
- FIPS code: 12-39550
- GNIS feature ID: 2404888
- Website: www.Lauderhill-FL.gov

Lauderhill is a city in Broward County, Florida, United States. It is a principal city of the Miami metropolitan area. As of the 2020 census, the city's population was 74,482.

== Etymology ==
The development that eventually came to be known as Lauderhill was originally to be named "Sunnydale", but William Safire, a friend of the developer, Herbert Sadkin, convinced him to change his mind. Safire felt that "Sunnydale" sounded like a neighborhood in Brooklyn. Sadkin said there were no hills in the new town, to which Safire replied, "There are probably no dales in Lauderdale, either!" From that discussion, the name "Lauderhill" was coined. The development eventually grew to become Lauderhill, the city.

== History ==
Lauderhill was one of two developments (the other in New York) that began largely as off-the-shelf architectural designs which had been available to the public at Macy's department store. The homes, which had been designed by Andrew Geller, had originally been on display at the "Typical American Houses" at the American Exhibition in Moscow. Following a group of approximately 200 of the homes constructed in Montauk, New York in 1963 and 1964, the same developer, Herbert Sadkin of the New York-based All-State Properties reprised his success in New York, building a series of similar homes in Florida, calling the development Lauderhill.

In 2003, the New York Times described the Macy's homes:

The package deal included a 730- to 1,200-square-foot house on a 75-by-100-foot lot, as well as state-of-the art appliances, furniture, housewares and everything else a family would need for a weekend in the sun, including toothbrushes and toilet paper. The cost was roughly $13,000 to $17,000.

The Inverrary Country Club was built in 1970, and two years later, its East golf course became home to the new Jackie Gleason Inverrary Classic on the PGA Tour, which it hosted through 1983. Gleason himself built his final home on the golf course.

Up until the late 1980s-early 1990s, Lauderhill was mostly a retirement community for Jews and a second home for snowbirds (especially in the Inverrary neighborhood). It is now home to mostly Jamaicans, West Indians, and African Americans, but it still has a sizeable white, Jewish, and Hispanic population in the Northwest section and the Inverrary neighborhood, located north of Oakland Park Boulevard and east of University Drive).

== Geography ==
The approximate coordinates for the City of Lauderhill is located in north-central Broward County.

The city borders the following municipalities:

- On its north and northeast:

Tamarac, Florida

- On its northeast:

Lauderdale Lakes, Florida

- On its east:

Fort Lauderdale, Florida

- On its south:

Plantation, Florida

- On its southwest and west:

Sunrise, Florida

According to the United States Census Bureau, the city has a total area of 8.6 square miles (22.2 km^{2}), of which 8.5 square miles (22.1 km^{2}) is land and 0.04 square miles (0.1 km^{2}) is water (0.37%).

=== Climate ===
Lauderhill has a tropical climate, similar to the climate found in much of the Caribbean. It is part of the only region in the 48 contiguous states that falls under that category. More specifically, it generally has a tropical monsoon climate (Köppen climate classification, Am).

== Demographics ==
Historical population
Census	Pop.	Note	%±
1960	132		—
1970	8,465		6,312.9%
1980	37,271		340.3%
1990	49,708		33.4%
2000	57,585		15.8%
2010	66,887		16.2%
2020	74,482		11.4%
U.S. Decennial Census

=== Racial and ethnic composition ===
Lauderhill, Florida – Racial and ethnic composition Note: the US Census treats Hispanic/Latino as an ethnic category. This table excludes Latinos from the racial categories and assigns them to a separate category. Hispanics/Latinos may be of any race.
Race / Ethnicity (NH = Non-Hispanic)	Pop 1980	Pop 1990	Pop 2000	Pop 2010	Pop 2020	% 1980	% 1990	% 2000	% 2010	% 2020
White (NH)	30,843	26,860	17,014	9,148	6,830	82.75%	54.04%	29.55%	13.68%	9.17%
Black or African American (NH)	4,748	18,617	33,355	49,969	56,313	12.74%	37.45%	57.92%	74.71%	75.61%
Native American or Alaska Native (NH)	46	62	54	136	117	0.12%	0.12%	0.09%	0.20%	0.16%
Asian (NH)	250	727	903	1,051	1,282	0.67%	1.46%	1.57%	1.57%	1.72%
Pacific Islander or Native Hawaiian (NH)	2	9	29	21	17	0.01%	0.02%	0.05%	0.03%	0.02%
Other race (NH)	113	57	213	274	592	0.30%	0.11%	0.37%	0.41%	0.79%
Mixed race or Multiracial (NH)	x	x	2,022	1,358	2,335	x	x	3.51%	2.03%	3.13%
Hispanic or Latino (any race)	1,269	3,376	3,995	4,930	6,996	3.40%	6.79%	6.94%	7.37%	9.39%
Total	37,271	49,708	57,585	66,887	74,482	100.00%	100.00%	100.00%	100.00%	100.00%

=== 2020 census ===
As of the 2020 census, Lauderhill had a population of 74,482 in 27,117 households, with 15,760 families residing in the city. The median age was 37.8 years. 23.5% of residents were under the age of 18 and 15.6% of residents were 65 years of age or older. For every 100 females there were 84.9 males, and for every 100 females age 18 and over there were 79.8 males age 18 and over.

100.0% of residents lived in urban areas, while 0.0% lived in rural areas.

There were 27,117 households in Lauderhill, of which 34.3% had children under the age of 18 living in them. Of all households, 31.7% were married-couple households, 19.5% were households with a male householder and no spouse or partner present, and 42.2% were households with a female householder and no spouse or partner present. About 27.0% of all households were made up of individuals and 10.0% had someone living alone who was 65 years of age or older.

There were 30,304 housing units, of which 10.5% were vacant. The homeowner vacancy rate was 1.9% and the rental vacancy rate was 7.9%.

Racial composition as of the 2020 census
Race	Number	Percent
White	8,028	10.8%
Black or African American	57,061	76.6%
American Indian and Alaska Native	171	0.2%
Asian	1,306	1.8%
Native Hawaiian and Other Pacific Islander	22	0.0%
Some other race	2,573	3.5%
Two or more races	5,321	7.1%
Hispanic or Latino (of any race)	6,996	9.4%

=== 2010 census ===
As of the 2010 United States census, there were 66,887 people, 24,265 households, and 16,598 families residing in the city.

=== 2000 census ===
Lauderhill has a high foreign-born population, with a noticeable proportion from the West Indies. In 2000, 33.65% of Lauderhill's population was born outside of the United States (24.63% were born in the Caribbean, and 14.73% from Jamaica alone). Other major West Indian populations were born in Haiti, Trinidad and Tobago, Grenada, Dominica, The Bahamas, Guyana, U.S. Virgin Islands, and other Caribbean nations.

As of 2000, 31.8% had children under the age of 18 living with them, 37.4% were married couples living together, 20.1% had a female householder with no husband present, and 37.4% were non-families. 31.0% of all households were made up of individuals, and 13.6% had someone living alone who was 65 years of age or older. The average household size was 2.49 and the average family size was 3.12.

As of 2000, in the city the population was spread out, with 26.6% under the age of 18, 8.7% from 18 to 24, 30.3% from 25 to 44, 18.3% from 45 to 64, and 16.1% who were 65 years of age or older. The median age was 35 years. For every 100 females, there were 84.5 males. For every 100 females age 18 and over, there were 78.0 males.

In 2000, the median income for a household in the city was $32,515, and the median income for a family was $36,723. Males had a median income of $29,756 versus $25,167 for females. The per capita income for the city was $17,243. About 15.5% of families and 17.8% of the population were below the poverty line, including 25.0% of those under age 18 and 13.1% of those age 65 or over.

In 2000, English was the sole home language of 79.14% of the population. Haitian Creole was spoken at home by 7.85% of residents, Spanish by 6.92%, French by 2.69%, Yiddish by 0.59%, and Hebrew by 0.45% of residents.

As of 2000, Lauderhill had the highest percentage of residents of Jamaican ancestry in the United States, at 20.11% of the city's population, and the percentage of Haitian residents in the United States, at 12.9% of the city's population

== Sports ==
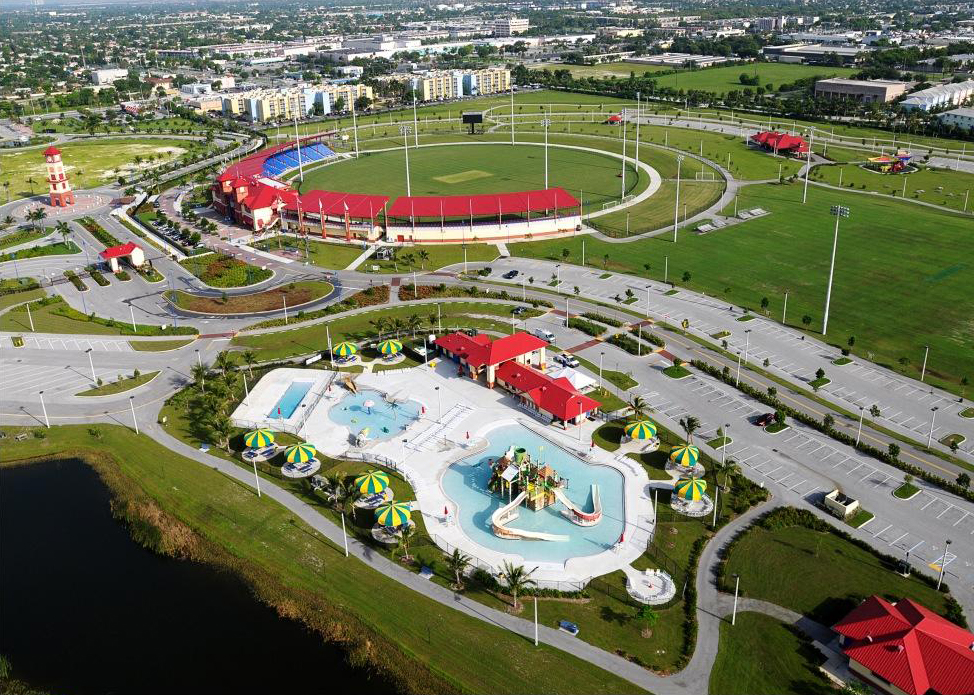
Central Broward Park & Broward County Stadium

On November 9, 2007, in the Central Broward Park, the Main Event cricket field, owned by Broward County, was opened.

On May 22, 2010, it became the first ground to host an international between two full members of the ICC (New Zealand and Sri Lanka) on U.S. soil after the games' World governing body gave its certification. The West Indies cricket team, who are the nearest premier cricketing region, have played there the most times.

The park features many other sports venues as well.

== Education ==
Broward County Public Schools operates public schools.

Elementary schools in the Lauderhill city limits include:

- Broward Estates Elementary School
- Castle Hill Elementary School
- Dr. Martin Luther King Jr. Montessori School
- Endeavour Primary Learning Center (K–3, with 4–5 students in the zone to Royal Palm Elementary School)
- Larkdale Elkementary School
- Lauderhill Paul Turner Elementary School
- Royal Palm Elementary School

Students in other sections of Lauderhill are zoned to the following elementary schools: Banyan Elementary School (Sunrise), Discovery Elementary School (Sunrise), Park Lakes Elementary School (Lauderdale Lakes), Plantation Elementary School (Plantation), and Village Elementary School (Sunrise).

Middle schools and 6th-12th grade schools with attendance zones serving Lauderhill include:

- Lauderhill 6-12 School
- Parkway Middle School
- Lauderdale Lakes Middle School in Lauderdale Lakes
- Millennium 6-12 Collegiate Academy in Tamarac
- Westpine Middle School in Sunrise

High schools with attendance zones serving Lauderhill include:

- Boyd H. Anderson High School in Lauderdale Lakes
- Piper High School in Sunrise
- Dillard High School (for 9–12 only) in Fort Lauderdale

A section of Lauderhill has a choice between Anderson and Piper. Lauderhill 6–12's high school program has no zoning boundary per se, but people who live in the middle school boundary have priority for admission. While Millennium's high school has no boundary, previous Millennium middle school students have priority for admission.

Charter schools include Rise Academy and Rise Academy II.

The University of Fort Lauderdale is located in Lauderhill.

== Notable people ==
- Autry Denson, Football player
- Jackie Gleason, comedic actor, star of The Honeymooners
- Ski Mask the Slump God, rapper
- Van Winitsky, tennis player
- XXXTentacion, rapper

== Sister cities ==
- Chaguanas, Trinidad and Tobago.
- Suzano, São Paulo, Brazil.
