= Cognizant Classic =

Golf tournament held in Florida, United States

Coordinates: 26.829°N 80.141°W

Tournament information
- Location: Palm Beach Gardens, Florida
- Established: 1972
- Courses: PGA National Resort and Spa (Champion Course)
- Par: 70
- Length: 7,125 yards (6,515 m)
- Organized by: IMG
- Tour: PGA Tour
- Format: Stroke play
- Prize fund: US$9,600,000
- Month played: February/March
- Website: thecognizantclassic.com

Tournament record score
- Aggregate: 264 Justin Leonard (2003)
- To par: −24 as above

Current champion
- (Colombia) Nico Echavarría

Location map
- Location in the United States Location in Florida

The Cognizant Classic is a professional golf tournament on the PGA Tour in south Florida. It was founded in 1972 as "Jackie Gleason's Inverrary Classic". Prior to a schedule change in 2021, this was frequently the first of the Florida events in late winter following the "West Coast Swing."

National Airlines was the sponsor in 1973 with Jackie Gleason. American Motors Corporation backed the event in 1981 as the "American Motors Inverrary Classic". From 1982 until 2023, American Honda Motor Company was the title sponsor, and the tournament was known as The Honda Classic. In late 2023, Cognizant became the new title sponsor; as a result, the name of the event was changed.

== Tournament history ==
The tournament's predecessor, the National Airlines Open Invitational, ran for three seasons from 1969 through 1971, all in late March at the Country Club of Miami in Hialeah. The Gleason tournament replaced it on the schedule a month earlier in 1972 at the Inverrary Country Club (East course) in Lauderhill and was among the richest events on tour with an inaugural purse of $260,000 and a $52,000 winner's share.

Gleason hosted a popular TV variety show with many friends in the entertainment industry and was well known on the PGA Tour at the Doral stop. He was eager to put his name on the new tournament. The 1976 tournament was billed as the Tournament Players Championship held in late February (as the early editions of the tournament were held as established tournaments with an increased purse and qualifications), won by Jack Nicklaus. Gleason's nine-year affiliation ended after 1980 when PGA Tour officials removed him from Tournament Players Championship promotions and focused on commercialization to provide more revenue.

The 1981 event was renamed "American Motors Inverrary Classic" as American Motors Corporation sponsored it. The following two years, it was known as the "Honda Inverrary Classic" after a switch in sponsor to American Honda Motor Company.

During this time, the tournament was staged at different Broward County courses giving the Honda Classic "a reputation as a rootless tournament that struggled to attract the top golfers" and it faced decreasing attendance. In 1984, the tournament moved to TPC Eagle Trace in Coral Springs, where it remained until 1991.

From 1992 through 1995, the event was held at the Weston Hills Golf & Country Club in Weston. It then returned to Coral Springs, first at the TPC at Eagle Trace in 1996, and then at the TPC at Heron Bay from 1997 until 2002. In 2003, the event moved to Palm Beach Gardens, first at the Country Club at Mirasol through 2006, then to the Champion Course at PGA National Resort and Spa in 2007.

Since 2007, the tournament's primary beneficiary is the Nicklaus Children's Health Care Foundation, chaired by Barbara Nicklaus, wife of hall of fame golfer Jack Nicklaus.

IMG bought the tournament's management company in 2013. The event grew in attendance and charitable contributions under IMG, but the player field suffered primarily because of the schedule that was set by the PGA Tour. By late 2023, Honda ended sponsorship and there was concern about the demise of the biggest sporting event held in Palm Beach County. However, control of the event was moved to PGA Tour's Championship Management Division, a six-year sponsorship was signed with Cognizant, and the event was renamed.

=== Player participation ===
Some celebrated players have won this tournament, including Nicklaus in three consecutive years, from 1976 (TPC) to 1978, the only consecutive winner in its history. However, the Honda Classic had acquired a reputation for struggling to attract the top players as it moved from course to course in South Florida. Since 2007, tournament has seen an improved player field, largely due to the decision to make PGA National the tournament's permanent home.

The prize money is comparable to other regular PGA Tour events. The total purse was $6.4 million in 2017, with a top prize of $1.152 million (this can be contrasted to the total purse in 1981 of $300,000 (the equivalent of only $1,062,408 in 2025 dollars). The original winner's share of $52,000 in 1972 made it one of the richest stops on tour, greater than for any of the four majors; it was more than double that of the Masters, which had a first prize of $25,000 in 1972.

== Tournament highlights ==
- 1972: Tom Weiskopf outdueled Jack Nicklaus by one shot to win the first edition.
- 1974: Leonard Thompson earned the first of his three PGA Tour wins, one shot ahead of Hale Irwin. After his victory, Thompson donated $10,000 of his winnings to the Boys Clubs of America.
- 1978: Jack Nicklaus birdied the last five holes to defeat Grier Jones by one shot, for his third consecutive win at Inverrary.
- 1986: Monday qualifier Kenny Knox won by a stroke over Clarence Rose, Jodie Mudd, Andy Bean, and John Mahaffey in spite of shooting a third round 80.
- 1990: John Huston wore three different pairs of shoes in practice and during the tournament after the PGA declared his wedge-soled Weight-Rites illegal.
- 1991: Steve Pate won by three strokes despite returning the worst final-round score by a PGA Tour tournament winner in ten years, a 75.
- 1992: Corey Pavin defeated Fred Couples in a sudden-death playoff after holing an 8-iron from 136-yards on the final hole to tie for the lead.
- 1996: Tim Herron became the first PGA Tour rookie in 13 years to win a tournament wire-to-wire.
- 2004: Thirty-eight-year-old PGA Tour rookie Todd Hamilton won by one shot over Davis Love III. Hamilton would go on to win The Open Championship later that year.
- 2012: With his win, Rory McIlroy rose to the top of the Official World Golf Ranking for the first time. Brian Harman shot a course record 61 in the second round.
- 2022: Sepp Straka becomes the first Austrian to win on the PGA Tour.
- 2025: Jake Knapp scored a 59 during the first round. He finished in a tie for sixth, 4 strokes behind winner Joe Highsmith, who became the first golfer in nine years to win a PGA Tour event after making the cut on the number.

== Tournament hosts ==
| Years | No. | Venue | City | State |
|---|---|---|---|---|
| 2007–present | 19 | PGA National Resort and Spa (Champion Course) | Palm Beach Gardens | Florida |
| 2003–2006 | 4 | Country Club at Mirasol | Palm Beach Gardens | Florida |
| 1997–2002 | 6 | TPC at Heron Bay | Coral Springs | Florida |
| 1996 | 1 | TPC Eagle Trace | Coral Springs | Florida |
| 1992–1995 | 4 | Weston Hills Golf and C.C. | Weston | Florida |
| 1984–1991 | 8 | TPC Eagle Trace | Coral Springs | Florida |
| 1972–1983 | 11 | Inverrary Country Club (East Course) | Lauderhill | Florida |

- No event in 1976, Inverrary hosted the Tournament Players Championship.

== Winners ==
| Year | Winner | Score | To par | Margin of victory | Runner(s)-up | Purse (US$) | Winner's share ($) |
Cognizant Classic
| 2026 | (Colombia) Nico Echavarría | 267 | −17 | 2 strokes | (Republic of Ireland) Shane Lowry (United States) Taylor Moore (United States) Austin Smotherman | 9,600,000 | 1,728,000 |
| 2025 | (United States) Joe Highsmith | 265 | −19 | 2 strokes | (United States) Jacob Bridgeman (United States) J. J. Spaun | 9,200,000 | 1,656,000 |
| 2024 | (United States) Austin Eckroat | 267 | −17 | 3 strokes | (Australia) Min Woo Lee (South Africa) Erik van Rooyen | 9,000,000 | 1,620,000 |
The Honda Classic
| 2023 | (United States) Chris Kirk | 266 | −14 | Playoff | (United States) Eric Cole | 8,400,000 | 1,512,000 |
| 2022 | (Austria) Sepp Straka | 270 | −10 | 1 stroke | (Republic of Ireland) Shane Lowry | 8,000,000 | 1,440,000 |
| 2021 | (Australia) Matt Jones | 268 | −12 | 5 strokes | (United States) Brandon Hagy | 7,000,000 | 1,260,000 |
| 2020 | (South Korea) Im Sung-jae | 274 | −6 | 1 stroke | (Canada) Mackenzie Hughes | 7,000,000 | 1,260,000 |
| 2019 | (United States) Keith Mitchell | 271 | −9 | 1 stroke | (United States) Rickie Fowler (United States) Brooks Koepka | 6,800,000 | 1,224,000 |
| 2018 | (United States) Justin Thomas | 272 | −8 | Playoff | (United States) Luke List | 6,600,000 | 1,188,000 |
| 2017 | (United States) Rickie Fowler | 268 | −12 | 4 strokes | (United States) Morgan Hoffmann (United States) Gary Woodland | 6,400,000 | 1,152,000 |
| 2016 | (Australia) Adam Scott | 271 | −9 | 1 stroke | (Spain) Sergio García | 6,100,000 | 1,098,000 |
| 2015 | (Republic of Ireland) Pádraig Harrington (2) | 274 | −6 | Playoff | (United States) Daniel Berger | 6,100,000 | 1,098,000 |
| 2014 | (United States) Russell Henley | 272 | −8 | Playoff | (Scotland) Russell Knox (Northern Ireland) Rory McIlroy (United States) Ryan Palmer | 6,000,000 | 1,080,000 |
| 2013 | (United States) Michael Thompson | 271 | −9 | 2 strokes | (Australia) Geoff Ogilvy | 6,000,000 | 1,080,000 |
| 2012 | (Northern Ireland) Rory McIlroy | 268 | −12 | 2 strokes | (United States) Tom Gillis (United States) Tiger Woods | 5,700,000 | 1,026,000 |
| 2011 | (South Africa) Rory Sabbatini | 271 | −9 | 1 stroke | (South Korea) Yang Yong-eun | 5,700,000 | 1,026,000 |
| 2010 | (Colombia) Camilo Villegas | 267 | −13 | 5 strokes | (United States) Anthony Kim | 5,600,000 | 1,008,000 |
| 2009 | (South Korea) Yang Yong-eun | 271 | −9 | 1 stroke | (United States) John Rollins | 5,600,000 | 1,008,000 |
| 2008 | (South Africa) Ernie Els | 274 | −6 | 1 stroke | (England) Luke Donald | 5,500,000 | 990,000 |
| 2007 | (United States) Mark Wilson | 275 | −5 | Playoff | (Argentina) José Cóceres (Colombia) Camilo Villegas (United States) Boo Weekley | 5,500,000 | 990,000 |
| 2006 | (England) Luke Donald | 276 | −12 | 2 strokes | (Australia) Geoff Ogilvy | 5,500,000 | 990,000 |
| 2005 | (Republic of Ireland) Pádraig Harrington | 274 | −14 | Playoff | (United States) Joe Ogilvie (Fiji) Vijay Singh | 5,500,000 | 990,000 |
| 2004 | (United States) Todd Hamilton | 276 | −12 | 1 stroke | (United States) Davis Love III | 5,000,000 | 900,000 |
| 2003 | (United States) Justin Leonard | 264 | −24 | 1 stroke | (United States) Chad Campbell (United States) Davis Love III | 5,000,000 | 900,000 |
| 2002 | (United States) Matt Kuchar | 269 | −19 | 2 strokes | (United States) Brad Faxon (United States) Joey Sindelar | 3,500,000 | 630,000 |
Honda Classic
| 2001 | (Sweden) Jesper Parnevik | 270 | −18 | 1 stroke | (United States) Mark Calcavecchia (Australia) Geoff Ogilvy (New Zealand) Craig Perks | 3,200,000 | 576,000 |
| 2000 | (United States) Dudley Hart | 269 | −19 | 1 stroke | (United States) J. P. Hayes (United States) Kevin Wentworth | 2,900,000 | 522,000 |
| 1999 | (Fiji) Vijay Singh | 277 | −11 | 2 strokes | (United States) Payne Stewart | 2,600,000 | 468,000 |
| 1998 | (United States) Mark Calcavecchia (2) | 270 | −18 | 3 strokes | (Fiji) Vijay Singh | 1,800,000 | 324,000 |
| 1997 | (Australia) Stuart Appleby | 274 | −14 | 1 stroke | (United States) Michael Bradley (United States) Payne Stewart | 1,500,000 | 270,000 |
| 1996 | (United States) Tim Herron | 271 | −17 | 4 strokes | (United States) Mark McCumber | 1,300,000 | 234,000 |
| 1995 | (United States) Mark O'Meara | 275 | −9 | 1 stroke | (England) Nick Faldo | 1,200,000 | 216,000 |
| 1994 | (Zimbabwe) Nick Price | 276 | −8 | 1 stroke | (Australia) Craig Parry | 1,100,000 | 198,000 |
| 1993 | (United States) Fred Couples | 207 (Note: Shortened to 54 holes due to weather.) | −9 | Playoff | (United States) Robert Gamez | 1,100,000 | 198,000 |
| 1992 | (United States) Corey Pavin | 273 | −15 | Playoff | (United States) Fred Couples | 1,100,000 | 198,000 |
| 1991 | (United States) Steve Pate | 279 | −9 | 3 strokes | (United States) Paul Azinger (Canada) Dan Halldorson | 1,000,000 | 180,000 |
| 1990 | (United States) John Huston | 282 | −6 | 2 strokes | (United States) Mark Calcavecchia | 1,000,000 | 180,000 |
| 1989 | (United States) Blaine McCallister | 266 | −22 | 4 strokes | (United States) Payne Stewart | 800,000 | 144,000 |
| 1988 | (United States) Joey Sindelar | 276 | −12 | 2 strokes | (United States) Ed Fiori (Scotland) Sandy Lyle (United States) Payne Stewart | 700,000 | 126,000 |
| 1987 | (United States) Mark Calcavecchia | 279 | −9 | 3 strokes | (West Germany) Bernhard Langer (United States) Payne Stewart | 600,000 | 108,000 |
| 1986 | (United States) Kenny Knox | 287 | −1 | 1 stroke | (United States) Andy Bean (United States) John Mahaffey (United States) Jodie Mudd (United States) Clarence Rose | 500,000 | 90,000 |
| 1985 | (United States) Curtis Strange | 275 | −13 | Playoff | (United States) Peter Jacobsen | 500,000 | 90,000 |
| 1984 | (United States) Bruce Lietzke | 280 | −8 | Playoff | (United States) Andy Bean | 500,000 | 90,000 |
Honda Inverrary Classic
| 1983 | (United States) Johnny Miller (2) | 278 | −10 | 2 strokes | (United States) Jack Nicklaus | 400,000 | 72,000 |
| 1982 | (United States) Hale Irwin | 269 | −19 | 1 stroke | (United States) George Burns (United States) Tom Kite | 400,000 | 72,000 |
American Motors Inverrary Classic
| 1981 | (United States) Tom Kite | 274 | −14 | 1 stroke | (United States) Jack Nicklaus | 300,000 | 54,000 |
Jackie Gleason-Inverrary Classic
| 1980 | (United States) Johnny Miller | 274 | −14 | 2 strokes | (United States) Charles Coody (United States) Bruce Lietzke | 300,000 | 54,000 |
| 1979 | (United States) Larry Nelson | 274 | −14 | 3 strokes | (United States) Grier Jones | 300,000 | 54,000 |
| 1978 | (United States) Jack Nicklaus (2) | 276 | −12 | 1 stroke | (United States) Grier Jones | 250,000 | 50,000 |
| 1977 | (United States) Jack Nicklaus | 275 | −13 | 5 strokes | (South Africa) Gary Player | 250,000 | 50,000 |
| 1976 | See 1976 Tournament Players Championship | | | | | | |
| 1975 | (United States) Bob Murphy | 273 | −15 | 1 stroke | (United States) Eddie Pearce | 260,000 | 52,000 |
| 1974 | (United States) Leonard Thompson | 278 | −10 | 1 stroke | (United States) Hale Irwin | 260,000 | 52,000 |
Jackie Gleason Inverrary-National Airlines Classic
| 1973 | (United States) Lee Trevino | 279 | −9 | 1 stroke | (United States) Forrest Fezler | 260,000 | 52,000 |
Jackie Gleason's Inverrary Classic
| 1972 | (United States) Tom Weiskopf | 278 | −10 | 1 stroke | (United States) Jack Nicklaus | 260,000 | 52,000 |

Note: Green highlight indicates scoring records.
