= 2009 PGA Tour =

Golf tour season

2009 PGA Tour season
- Duration: January 8, 2009 – November 15, 2009
- Number of official events: 45 (Note: One further tournament was scheduled but was canceled.)
- Most wins: (United States) Tiger Woods (6)
- FedEx Cup: (United States) Tiger Woods
- Money list: (United States) Tiger Woods
- PGA Tour Player of the Year: (United States) Tiger Woods
- PGA Player of the Year: (United States) Tiger Woods
- Rookie of the Year: (Australia) Marc Leishman

The 2009 PGA Tour was the 94th season of the PGA Tour, the main professional golf tour in the United States. It was also the 41st season since separating from the PGA of America, and the third edition of the FedEx Cup.

== Schedule ==
The following table lists official events during the 2009 season.

Date	Tournament	Location	Purse (US$)	Winner (Note: The number in parentheses after each winner's name is the number of PGA Tour events they had won up to and including that tournament. This information is only shown for PGA Tour members.)	OWGR points	Notes
Jan 11	Mercedes-Benz Championship	Hawaii	5,600,000	(Australia) Geoff Ogilvy (5)	44	Winners-only event
Jan 18	Sony Open in Hawaii	Hawaii	5,400,000	(United States) Zach Johnson (5)	44	
Jan 25	Bob Hope Classic	California	5,100,000	(United States) Pat Perez (1)	32	Pro-Am
Feb 1	FBR Open	Arizona	6,000,000	(United States) Kenny Perry (13)	54	
Feb 8	Buick Invitational	California	5,300,000	(United States) Nick Watney (2)	44	
Feb 15	AT&T Pebble Beach National Pro-Am	California	6,100,000	(United States) Dustin Johnson (2)	46	Pro-Am
Feb 22	Northern Trust Open	California	6,300,000	(United States) Phil Mickelson (35)	62	
Mar 1	WGC-Accenture Match Play Championship	Arizona	8,500,000	(Australia) Geoff Ogilvy (6)	76	World Golf Championship
Mar 1	Mayakoba Golf Classic	Mexico	3,600,000	(United States) Mark Wilson (2)	24	Alternate event
Mar 8	The Honda Classic	Florida	5,600,000	(South Korea) Yang Yong-eun (1)	46	
Mar 15	WGC-CA Championship	Florida	8,500,000	(United States) Phil Mickelson (36)	78	World Golf Championship
Mar 15	Puerto Rico Open	Puerto Rico	3,500,000	(United States) Michael Bradley (3)	24	Alternate event
Mar 22	Transitions Championship	Florida	5,400,000	(South Africa) Retief Goosen (7)	46	
Mar 29	Arnold Palmer Invitational	Florida	6,000,000	(United States) Tiger Woods (66)	60	Invitational
Apr 5	Shell Houston Open	Texas	5,700,000	(England) Paul Casey (1)	62	
Apr 12	Masters Tournament	Georgia	7,500,000	(Argentina) Ángel Cabrera (2)	100	Major championship
Apr 19	Verizon Heritage	South Carolina	5,700,000	(United States) Brian Gay (2)	48	Invitational
Apr 26	Zurich Classic of New Orleans	Louisiana	6,300,000	(United States) Jerry Kelly (3)	38	
May 3	Quail Hollow Championship	North Carolina	6,500,000	(United States) Sean O'Hair (3)	68	
May 10	The Players Championship	Florida	9,500,000	(Sweden) Henrik Stenson (2)	80	Flagship event
May 17	Valero Texas Open	Texas	6,100,000	(United States) Zach Johnson (6)	26	
May 24	HP Byron Nelson Championship	Texas	6,500,000	(South Africa) Rory Sabbatini (5)	44	
May 31	Crowne Plaza Invitational at Colonial	Texas	6,200,000	(United States) Steve Stricker (5)	58	Invitational
Jun 7	Memorial Tournament	Ohio	6,000,000	(United States) Tiger Woods (67)	62	Invitational
Jun 14	St. Jude Classic	Tennessee	5,600,000	(United States) Brian Gay (3)	46	
Jun 22	U.S. Open	New York	7,500,000	(United States) Lucas Glover (2)	100	Major championship
Jun 28	Travelers Championship	Connecticut	6,000,000	(United States) Kenny Perry (14)	48	
Jul 5	AT&T National	Maryland	6,000,000	(United States) Tiger Woods (68)	50	Invitational
Jul 12	John Deere Classic	Illinois	4,300,000	(United States) Steve Stricker (6)	34	
Jul 19	The Open Championship	Scotland	£4,200,000	(United States) Stewart Cink (6)	100	Major championship
Jul 19	U.S. Bank Championship in Milwaukee	Wisconsin	4,000,000	(United States) Bo Van Pelt (1)	24	Alternate event
Jul 26	RBC Canadian Open	Canada	5,100,000	(Australia) Nathan Green (1)	34	
Aug 2	Buick Open	Michigan	5,100,000	(United States) Tiger Woods (69)	36	
Aug 9	WGC-Bridgestone Invitational	Ohio	8,500,000	(United States) Tiger Woods (70)	76	World Golf Championship
Aug 9	Legends Reno–Tahoe Open	Nevada	3,000,000	(United States) John Rollins (3)	24	Alternate event
Aug 16	PGA Championship	Minnesota	7,500,000	(South Korea) Yang Yong-eun (2)	100	Major championship
Aug 23	Wyndham Championship	North Carolina	5,200,000	(United States) Ryan Moore (1)	32	
Aug 30	The Barclays	New Jersey	7,500,000	(United States) Heath Slocum (3)	70	FedEx Cup playoff event
Sep 7	Deutsche Bank Championship	Massachusetts	7,500,000	(United States) Steve Stricker (7)	70	FedEx Cup playoff event
Sep 13	BMW Championship	Illinois	7,500,000	(United States) Tiger Woods (71)	68	FedEx Cup playoff event
Sep 27	The Tour Championship	Georgia	7,500,000	(United States) Phil Mickelson (37)	56	FedEx Cup playoff event
Oct 5	Turning Stone Resort Championship	New York	6,000,000	(United States) Matt Kuchar (2)	30	Fall Series
Oct 18	Justin Timberlake Shriners Hospitals for Children Open	Nevada	4,200,000	(Scotland) Martin Laird (1)	40	Fall Series
Oct 25	Frys.com Open	Arizona	5,000,000	(United States) Troy Matteson (2)	28	Fall Series
~~Nov 1~~	Viking Classic	Mississippi	–	Canceled	–	Fall Series
Nov 15	Children's Miracle Network Classic	Florida	4,700,000	(Canada) Stephen Ames (4)	24	Fall Series

=== Unofficial events ===
The following events were sanctioned by the PGA Tour, but did not carry FedEx Cup points or official money, nor were wins official.

Date	Tournament	Location	Purse ($)	Winner(s)	OWGR points	Notes
Mar 17	Tavistock Cup	Florida	2,500,000	Team Lake Nona	n/a	Team event
Jun 23	CVS Caremark Charity Classic	Rhode Island	1,500,000	(Zimbabwe) Nick Price and (United States) David Toms	n/a	Team event
Oct 11	Presidents Cup	California	n/a	Team USA	n/a	Team event
Oct 21	PGA Grand Slam of Golf	Bermuda	1,350,000	(United States) Lucas Glover	n/a	Limited-field event
Nov 8	WGC-HSBC Champions	China	7,000,000	(United States) Phil Mickelson	66	World Golf Championship
Nov 10	Wendy's 3-Tour Challenge	Nevada	1,000,000	LPGA Tour	n/a	Team event
Nov 11	Kiwi Challenge	New Zealand	2,000,000	(United States) Anthony Kim	n/a	Limited-field event
Nov 29	Omega Mission Hills World Cup	China	5,500,000	(Italy) Edoardo Molinari and (Italy) Francesco Molinari	n/a	Team event
Dec 6	Chevron World Challenge	California	5,750,000	(United States) Jim Furyk	48	Limited-field event
Dec 13	Shark Shootout	Florida	3,000,000	(United States) Jerry Kelly and (United States) Steve Stricker	n/a	Team event

== Location of tournaments ==
Location of official tournaments of the 2009 PGA Tour in the continental United States and Canada.
600-point event (Players & Majors)
550-point event (World Golf Championships)
500-point event (Regular events)
250-point event (Alternate events)
FedEx Cup playoff event
Fall Series event
Location of official tournaments of the 2009 PGA Tour outside the continental United States and Canada.
600-point event (Players & Majors)
500-point event (Regular events)
250-point event (Alternate events)

== FedEx Cup ==
=== Final standings ===
For full rankings, see 2009 FedEx Cup Playoffs.

Final top 10 players in the FedEx Cup:

Position	Player	Points	Bonus money ($)
1	(United States) Tiger Woods	4,000	10,000,000
2	(United States) Phil Mickelson	2,920	3,000,000
3	(United States) Steve Stricker	2,750	2,000,000
4	(United States) Jim Furyk	2,437	1,500,000
5	(United States) Sean O'Hair	2,200	1,000,000
6	(United States) Zach Johnson	2,072	800,000
7	(Republic of Ireland) Pádraig Harrington	2,050	700,000
8	(United States) Heath Slocum	1,855	600,000
9	(United States) Kenny Perry	1,450	550,000
10	(United States) Scott Verplank	1,245	500,000

== Money list ==
The money list was based on prize money won during the season, calculated in U.S. dollars.

Position	Player	Prize money ($)
1	(United States) Tiger Woods	10,508,163
2	(United States) Steve Stricker	6,332,636
3	(United States) Phil Mickelson	5,332,755
4	(United States) Zach Johnson	4,714,813
5	(United States) Kenny Perry	4,445,562
6	(United States) Sean O'Hair	4,316,493
7	(United States) Jim Furyk	3,946,515
8	(Australia) Geoff Ogilvy	3,866,270
9	(United States) Lucas Glover	3,692,580
10	(South Korea) Yang Yong-eun	3,489,516

== Awards ==
Award	Winner	Ref.
PGA Tour Player of the Year (Jack Nicklaus Trophy)	(United States) Tiger Woods	
PGA Player of the Year	(United States) Tiger Woods	
Rookie of the Year	(Australia) Marc Leishman	
Scoring leader (PGA Tour – Byron Nelson Award)	(United States) Tiger Woods	
Scoring leader (PGA – Vardon Trophy)	(United States) Tiger Woods	

== See also ==
- 2009 in golf
- 2009 Champions Tour
- 2009 Nationwide Tour
