= Jim "Bones" Mackay =

American golf caddie and commentator

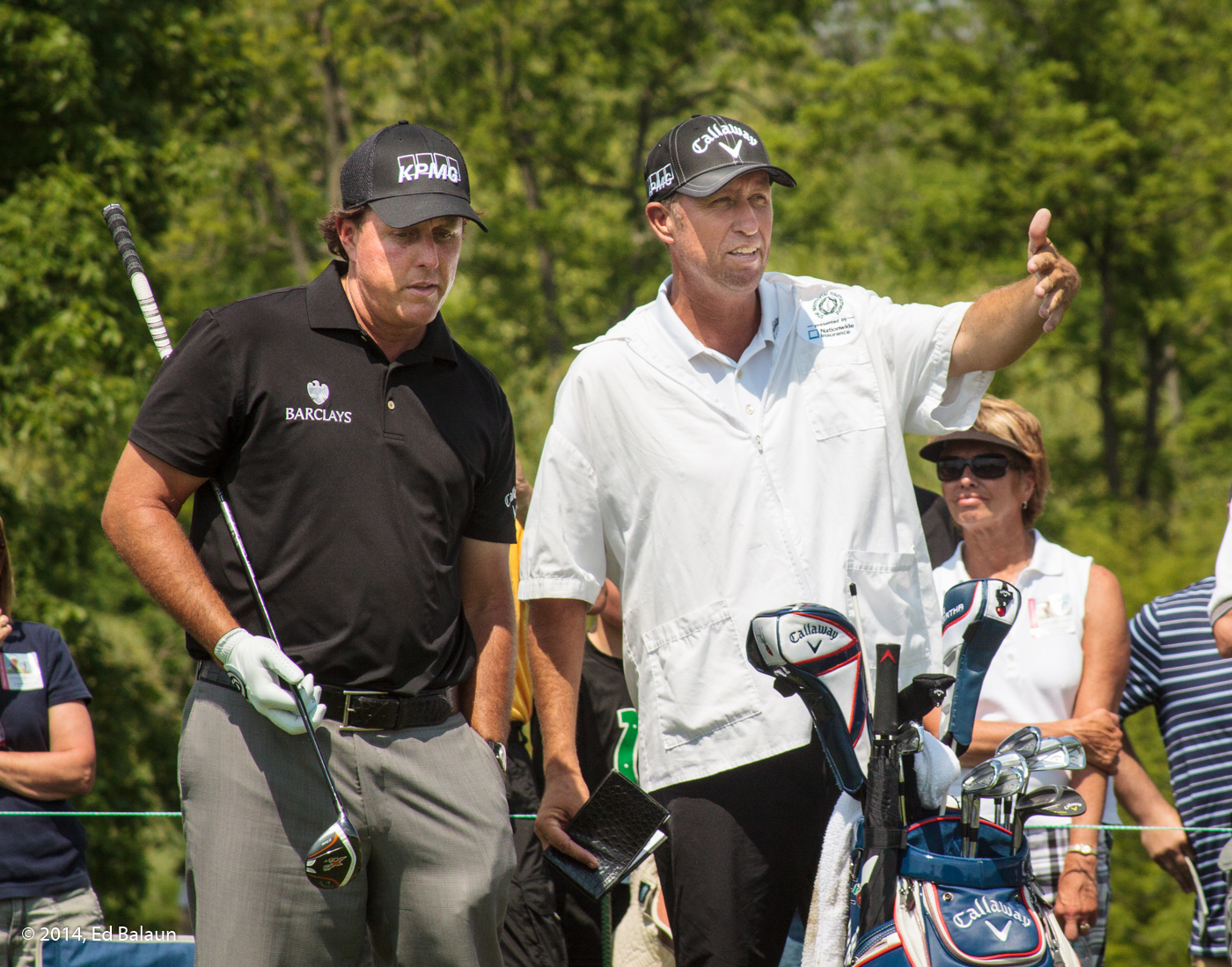
Phil Mickelson consults with his longtime caddie, Jim "Bones" MacKay, at Muirfield Village Golf Club in 2014

Jim "Bones" Mackay (born May 8, 1965) is an American golf caddie and golf commentator. For 25 years, he was the caddie for Phil Mickelson. His nickname, "Bones", was created in 1990 when PGA Tour player Fred Couples couldn't remember the name of the 6-foot 4-inch Mackay.

Mackay was born in Redhill, Surrey, England; his family moved to New Smyrna Beach, Florida, when he was seven years old. He played golf for Columbus College in Georgia, followed by a job in the pro shop and bag room at Columbus' Green Island Country Club. There he met and began to caddie for Larry Mize and later Scott Simpson and Curtis Strange, before being hired by Mickelson in 1992, at the start of Mickelson's PGA career.

Of their long and close relationship, Mickelson has been quoted as saying "Bones is the only guy on the golf course that wants me to play well, so why am I going to sit there and berate him and treat him poorly? He's the only guy trying to work his tail off for me."

Mackay had both knees replaced in October 2016. On June 20, 2017, it was announced that Phil and "Bones" were mutually parting ways. Having been on Mickelson's bag since 1992, he had caddied for him in all but one of his major championships: the 2004 Masters, the 2005 PGA, the 2006 Masters, the 2010 Masters, and the 2013 Open Championship.

Mackay joined NBC/Golf Channel in 2017 as a commentator. In January 2018 he returned to caddying for one week, at the Sony Open in Hawaii, as a substitute for Justin Thomas's regular caddie Jimmy Johnson, who was injured. On September 30, 2021, Mackay announced he was returning to the bag as full-time caddie for Justin Thomas.

On April 3, 2024, Thomas announced that he and Mackay were parting ways, a week before the 2024 Masters Tournament.

Mackay lives in Scottsdale, Arizona, with his wife, Jen (Olsen) – a friend of Phil Mickelson's wife, Amy. Jen was introduced to Mackay by the Mickelsons – and their children, Oliver and Emma.
