= Phil Mickelson =

American professional golfer (born 1970)

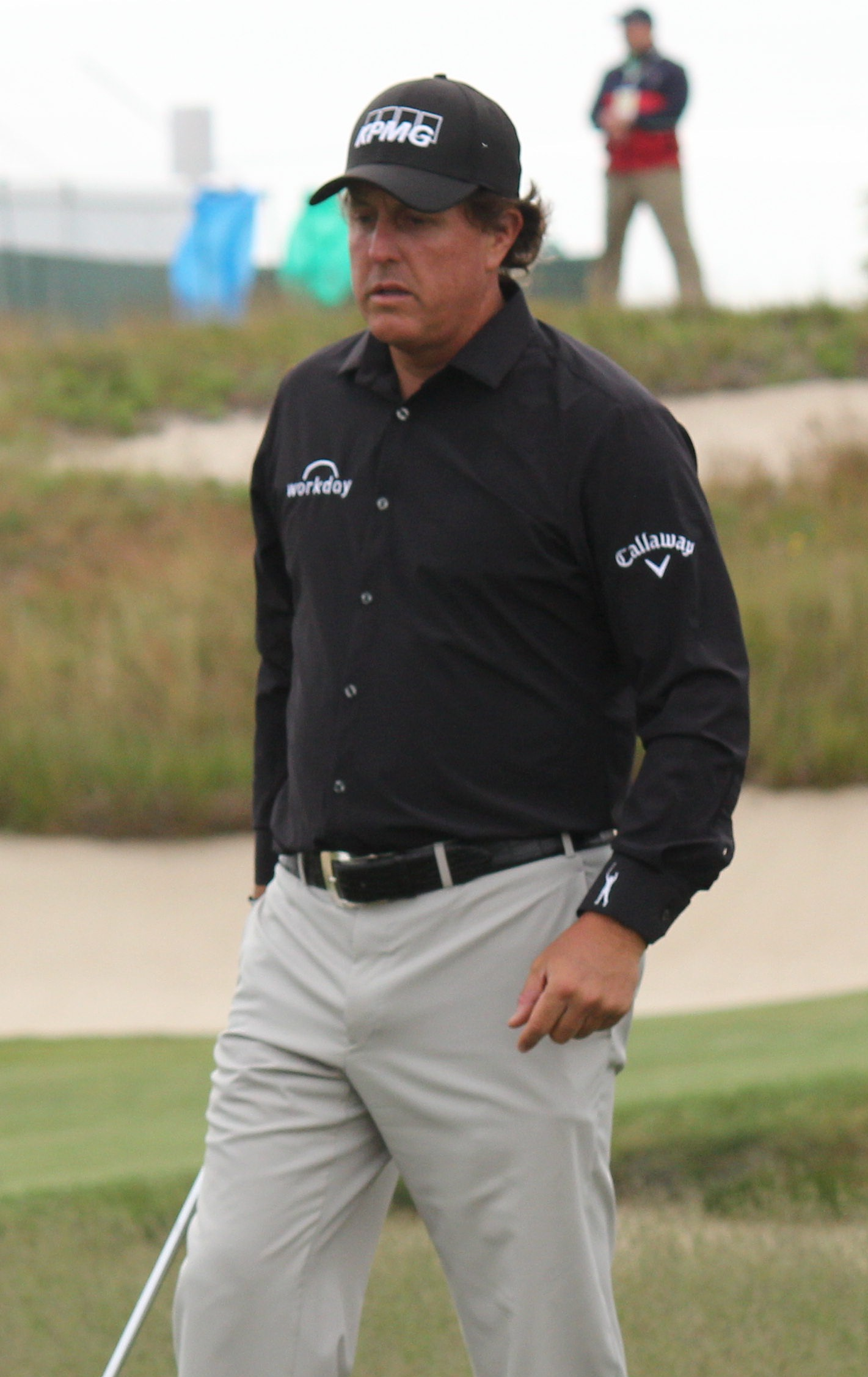
- Mickelson at the 2018 U.S. Open at Shinnecock Hills

Personal information
- Full name: Philip Alfred Mickelson
- Nickname: Lefty
- Nationality: United States
- Born: June 16, 1970 (age 56) San Diego, California, U.S.
- Height: 6 ft 3 in (191 cm)
- Weight: 201 lb (91 kg; 14.4 st)
- Spouse: Amy McBride (m. 1996)
- Children: 3

Career
- Sport: Golf
- College: Arizona State University
- Turned professional: 1992
- Current tour: LIV Golf
- Former tours: PGA Tour; PGA Tour Champions
- Professional wins: 57
- Highest ranking: 2 (February 11, 2001)

Number of wins by tour
- PGA Tour: 45 (8th all time)
- European Tour: 11
- Challenge Tour: 1
- PGA Tour Champions: 4
- Other: 4

Best results in major championships (wins: 6)
- Masters Tournament: Won: 2004, 2006, 2010
- PGA Championship: Won: 2005, 2021
- U.S. Open: 2nd/T2: 1999, 2002, 2004, 2006, 2009, 2013
- The Open Championship: Won: 2013

Achievements and awards
- World Golf Hall of Fame: 2012 (member page)
- Haskins Award: 1990, 1991, 1992
- Jack Nicklaus Award: 1990, 1991, 1992

Philip Alfred Mickelson (born June 16, 1970) is an American professional golfer who currently plays in the LIV Golf League. He has won 45 events on the PGA Tour, including six major championships: three Masters titles (2004, 2006, 2010), two PGA Championships (2005, 2021), and one Open Championship (2013). With his win at the 2021 PGA Championship, Mickelson became the oldest major championship winner in history at the age of 50 years, 11 months, and 7 days. He is nicknamed "Lefty", as he plays left-handed.

Mickelson is one of 17 players in the history of golf to win at least three of the four majors. He has won every major except the U.S. Open, in which he has finished runner-up a record six times. In 2022, Mickelson became the only golfer who has won three different majors to join the Saudi-backed LIV Golf tour, leaving his PGA Tour membership of 30 years.

Mickelson has spent more than 25 consecutive years in the top 50 of the Official World Golf Ranking. He has spent over 700 weeks in the top 10, has reached a career-high world ranking of No. 2 several times and is a life member of the PGA Tour. Although naturally right-handed, he is known for his left-handed swing, having learned it by mirroring his right-handed father's swing. He was inducted into the World Golf Hall of Fame in 2012.

== Early life, education, and amateur career ==
Philip Alfred Mickelson was born on June 16, 1970, in San Diego, California, to parents Philip Mickelson Sr., an airline pilot and former naval aviator, and Mary Santos. He was raised there and in Scottsdale, Arizona. Mickelson has Portuguese, Swedish, and Sicilian ancestry. His maternal grandfather, Alfred Santos (also Mickelson's middle name) was a caddie at Pebble Beach Golf Links and took Phil to play golf as a child.

Although otherwise right-handed, he played golf left-handed since he learned by watching his right-handed father swing, mirroring his style. Mickelson began golf under his father's instruction before starting school. Phil Sr.'s work schedule as a commercial pilot allowed them to play together several times a week and young Phil honed his creative short game on an extensive practice area in their San Diego backyard. Mickelson graduated from the University of San Diego High School in 1988.

=== College career ===
Mickelson attended Arizona State University in Tempe on a golf scholarship and became the face of amateur golf in the United States; he captured three NCAA individual championships and three Haskins Awards (1990, 1991, 1992) as the outstanding collegiate golfer. With three individual NCAA championships, he shares the record for most individual NCAA championships alongside Ben Crenshaw. Mickelson also led the Sun Devils to the NCAA team title in 1990. Over the course of his collegiate career, he won 16 tournaments. He was the second collegiate golfer to earn first-team All-American honors all four years.

=== Amateur career ===
In 1990, he also became the first with a left-handed swing to win the U.S. Amateur title, defeating high school teammate Manny Zerman 5 and 4 in the 36-hole final at Cherry Hills, south of Denver. He won his first PGA Tour event, the Northern Telecom Open, in Tucson, making him one of the few golfers to win a PGA Tour event as an amateur in the history of the PGA Tour. With five holes remaining, Mickelson led by a stroke, but made a triple-bogey and was then three strokes behind. The leaders ahead of him then stumbled, and he birdied 16 and 18 to win by a stroke. That April, Mickelson was the low amateur at the Masters Tournament in Augusta, Georgia. With his two-year PGA Tour exemption from the Tucson win, he played in several tour events in 1992 while an amateur but failed to make a cut.

== Professional career ==
Mickelson graduated from ASU in June 1992 and turned professional. He bypassed the tour's qualifying process (Q-School) because of his 1991 win in Tucson, which earned him a two-year exemption. In 1992, Mickelson hired Jim "Bones" Mackay as his caddy. He won many PGA Tour tournaments during this period, including the Byron Nelson Golf Classic and the World Series of Golf in 1996, the AT&T Pebble Beach National Pro-Am in 1998, the Colonial National Invitation in 2000, and the Greater Hartford Open in 2001 and again in 2002.

His 2000 Buick Invitational win ended Tiger Woods's streak of six consecutive victories on the PGA Tour. After the win, Mickelson said, "I didn't want to be the bad guy. I wasn't trying to end the streak per se. I was just trying to win the golf tournament." Although he had performed very well in the majors up to the end of the 2003 season (17 top-ten finishes, and six second- or third-place finishes between 1999 and 2003), Mickelson's inability to win any of them led to him frequently being described as the "best player never to win a major".

=== 2004–2006: First three major wins ===
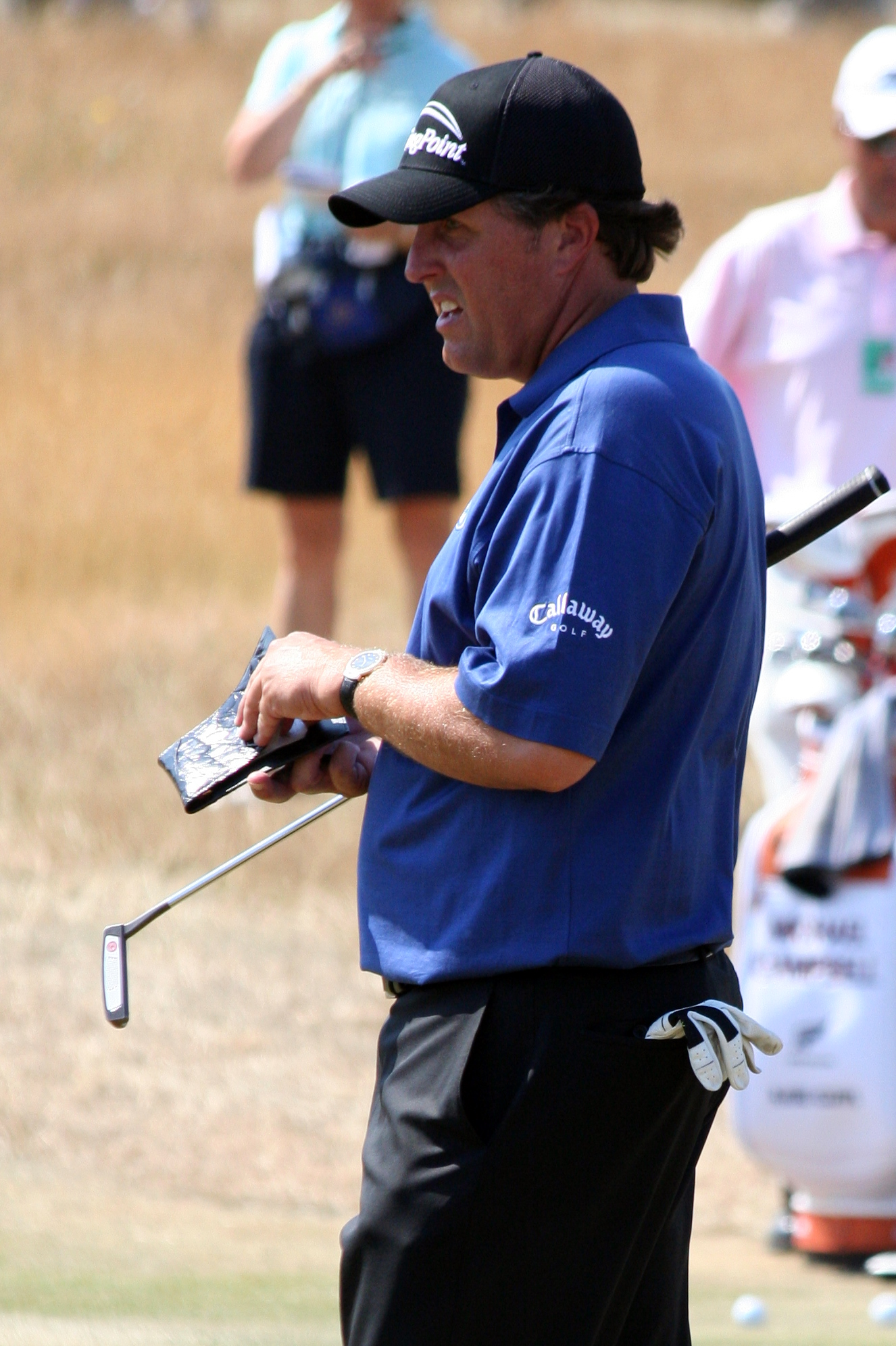
Mickelson at The Open Championship in 2006 at Hoylake

Mickelson's first major championship win came in his thirteenth year on the PGA Tour in 2004, when he secured victory in the Masters with an 18-foot (5.5 m) birdie putt on the final hole. Ernie Els was the runner-up at a stroke back; the two played in different pairs in the final round and had traded birdies and eagles on the back nine. In addition to getting the "majors monkey" off his back, Mickelson was now only the third golfer with a left-handed swing to win a major; the others being New Zealander Sir Bob Charles, who won The Open Championship in 1963, and Canadian Mike Weir, who won The Masters in 2003. All three are naturally right-handed but play left-handed. A fourth left-handed winner is natural southpaw Bubba Watson, the Masters champion in 2012 and 2014. Brian Harman won the 2023 Open Championship.

Prior to the Ryder Cup in 2004, Mickelson was dropped from his long-standing contract with Titleist/Acushnet Golf after an incident when he left a voicemail message for a Callaway Golf executive. In it, he praised their driver and golf ball and thanked them for their help in getting some equipment for his brother. This message was played to all of their salesmen, and eventually found its way back to Titleist. He was then let out of his multi-year deal with Titleist 16 months early and signed on with Callaway Golf. He endured a great deal of ridicule and scrutiny from the press and fellow Ryder Cup members for his equipment change so close to the Ryder Cup matches. He faltered at the 2004 Ryder Cup with a 1-3-0 record but refused to blame the sudden change in equipment or his practice methods for his performance.

In November 2004, Mickelson tallied his career-low for an 18-hole round: a 59 at the PGA Grand Slam of Golf at Poipu Bay Golf Course in Hawaii. The following year, Mickelson captured his second major at the PGA Championship at Baltusrol in a Monday final-round conclusion due to inclement weather the previous day. On the 18th hole, Mickelson hit one of his trademark soft pitches from deep greenside rough to within 18 inches (460 mm) of the cup and made his birdie to finish at a 4-under-par total of 276, one shot ahead of Steve Elkington and Thomas Bjørn. Mickelson captured his third major title the following spring at the Masters. He won his second green jacket after shooting a 3-under-par final round, winning by two strokes over runner-up Tim Clark. This win propelled him to 2nd place in the Official World Golf Ranking (his career best), behind Woods, and ahead of Vijay Singh and Retief Goosen.

After winning two majors in a row heading into the U.S. Open at Winged Foot, he was bidding to join Ben Hogan and Tiger Woods as the only players to win three consecutive majors (not necessarily in the same calendar year). He was the joint leader going into the final round, but he was part of a wild finish to the tournament, in which he made major mistakes on the final hole and ended up in a tie for second place at +6 (286), one shot behind Geoff Ogilvy. Mickelson bogeyed the 16th hole. On the 17th hole, with the lead at +4, he missed the fairway to the left, and his drive finished inside a garbage can, from which he was granted a free drop; he parred the hole. He had a one-shot lead and was in the last group going into the final hole. Needing a par on the 18th hole for a one-shot victory, Mickelson continued with his aggressive style of play and chose to hit a driver off the tee; he hit his shot well left of the fairway (he had hit only two of thirteen fairways previously in the round). The ball bounced off a corporate hospitality tent and settled in an area of trampled-down grass that was enclosed with trees. He decided to go for the green with his second shot, rather than play it safe and pitch out into the fairway. His ball then hit a tree and did not advance more than 50 yards (46 m). His next shot plugged into the left greenside bunker. He was unable to get up and down from there, resulting in a double bogey and costing him a chance of winning the championship outright or getting into an 18-hole playoff with Ogilvy. After his finish, he was in shock and congratulated Ogilvy and apologized to his supporters.

=== 2006–2009 ===
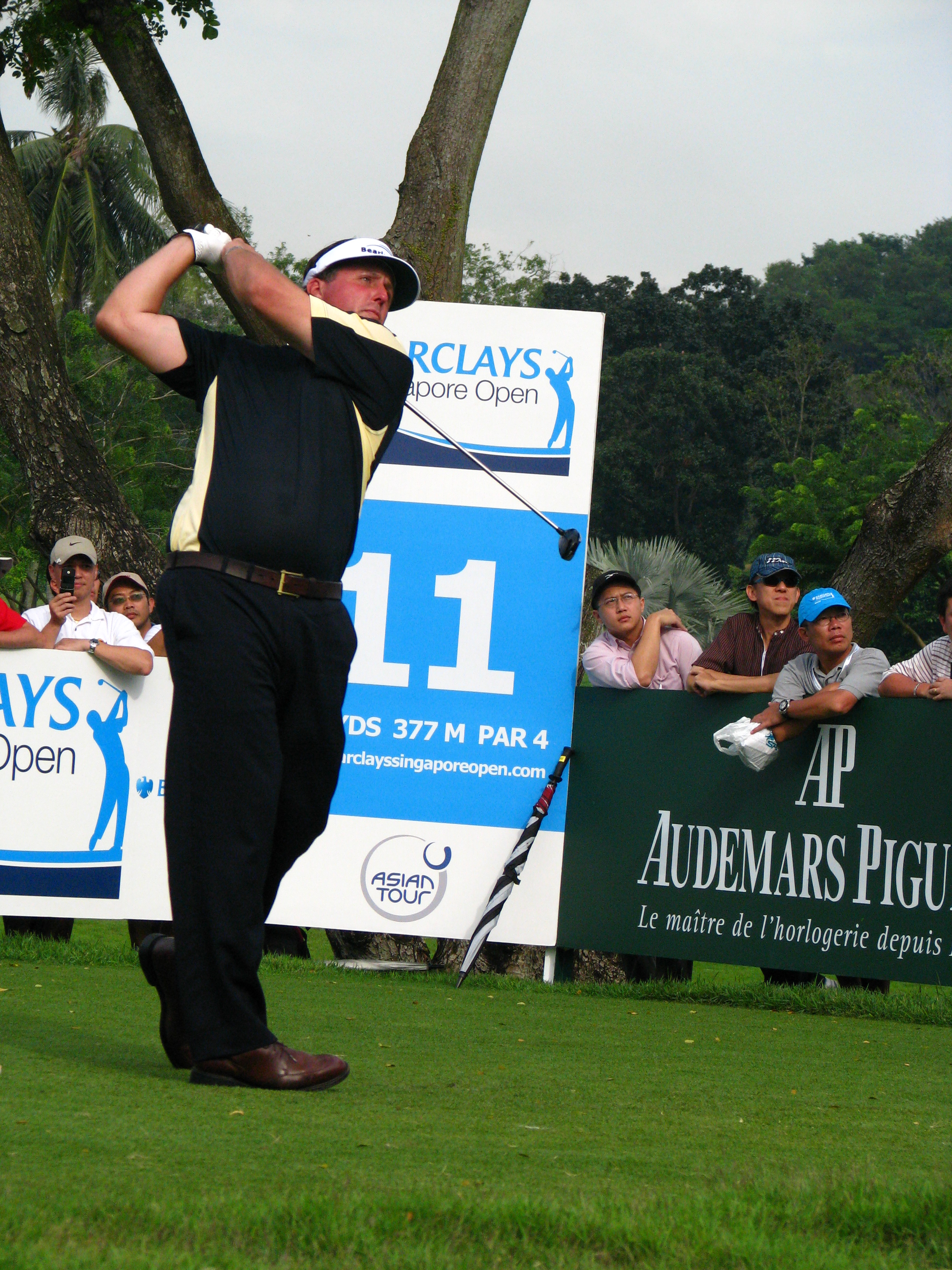
Mickelson at 2007 Barclays Singapore Open.

During the third round of the 2006 Ford Championship at Doral, Mickelson gave a spectator $200 after his wayward tee shot at the par-5 10th broke the man's watch. Mickelson also has shown other signs of appreciation. In 2007 after hearing the story of retired NFL player, Conrad Dobler, and his family on ESPN explaining their struggles to pay medical bills, Mickelson volunteered to pay tuition for Holli Dobler, Conrad Dobler's daughter, at Miami University in Oxford, Ohio.

Frustrated with his driving accuracy, Mickelson made the decision in April 2007 to leave longtime swing coach, Rick Smith. He then began working with Butch Harmon, a former coach of Tiger Woods and Greg Norman. On May 13, Mickelson came from a stroke back on the final round to shoot a three-under 69 to win The Players Championship with an 11-under-par 277.

In the U.S. Open at Oakmont in June, Mickelson missed the cut (by a stroke) for the first time in 31 majors after shooting 11 over par for 36 holes. He had been hampered by a wrist injury that was incurred while practicing in the thick rough at Oakmont a few weeks before the tournament.

On September 3, 2007, Mickelson won the Deutsche Bank Championship, which is the second FedEx Cup playoff event. On the final day, he was paired with Tiger Woods, who ended up finishing two strokes behind Mickelson in a tie for second. It was the first time that Mickelson was able to beat Woods while the two stars were paired together on the final day of a tournament. The next day Mickelson announced that he would not be competing in the third FedEx Cup playoff event. The day before his withdrawal, Mickelson said during a television interview that PGA Tour Commissioner, Tim Finchem, had not responded to advice he had given him on undisclosed issues.

In 2008, Mickelson won the Crowne Plaza Invitational at Colonial with a −14, one shot ahead of Tim Clark and Rod Pampling. Mickelson shot a first-round 65 to start off the tournament at −5. He ended the day tied with Brett Wetterich, two shots behind leader, Johnson Wagner. Mickelson shot a second-round 68, and the third round 65, overall, being −12 for the first three rounds. On the final hole, after an absolutely horrendous tee shot, he was in thick rough with trees in his way. Many players would have punched out and taken their chances at making par from the fairway with a good wedge shot. Instead, Mickelson pulled out a high-lofted wedge and hit his approach shot over a tree, landing on the green where he one-putted for the win.

Mickelson won his first 2009 tour event when he defended his title at the Northern Trust Open at Riviera, one stroke ahead of Steve Stricker. The victory was Mickelson's 35th on tour; he surpassed Vijay Singh for second place on the current PGA Tour wins list. A month later, he won his 36th, and his first World Golf Championship, at the WGC-CA Championship with a one-stroke win over Nick Watney.

On May 20, it was announced that his wife Amy was diagnosed with breast cancer, and Mickelson announced that he would suspend his PGA Tour schedule indefinitely. She would begin treatment with major surgery as early as the following two weeks. Mickelson was scheduled to play the HP Byron Nelson Championship May 21–24, and to defend his title May 28–31 at the Crowne Plaza Invitational at Colonial, but withdrew from both events. During the final round of the 2009 BMW PGA Championship, fellow golfer and family friend John Daly wore bright pink trousers in support of Mickelson's wife. Also, the next Saturday, at the Crowne Plaza Invitational at Colonial, a "Pink Out" event was hosted, and the PGA Tour players all wore pink that day, to support the Mickelson family.

On May 31, Mickelson announced that he would return to play on the PGA Tour in June at the St. Jude Classic and the U.S. Open, since he had heard from the doctors treating his wife that her cancer had been detected in an early stage. Mickelson shot a final round 70 at the 2009 U.S. Open and recorded his fifth runner-up finish at the U.S. Open. He shared the lead after an eagle at the 13th hole, but fell back with bogeys on 15 and 17; Lucas Glover captured the championship.

On July 6, it was announced that his mother Mary was diagnosed with breast cancer and would have surgery at the same hospital where his wife was treated. After hearing the news that his mother had been diagnosed with breast cancer, Mickelson took another leave of absence from the tour, missing The Open Championship at Turnberry. On July 28, Mickelson announced he would return in August at the WGC-Bridgestone Invitational, the week before the PGA Championship at Hazeltine National Golf Club.

In September, Mickelson won The Tour Championship for the second time in his career. He entered the final round four strokes off the lead, but shot a final round 65 to win the event by three strokes over Tiger Woods. With the win, Mickelson finished the season second behind Woods in the 2009 FedEx Cup standings.

On November 8, Mickelson won the WGC-HSBC Champions by one shot over Ernie Els in Shanghai.

=== 2010: Third Masters win ===
In 2010, Mickelson won the Masters Tournament on April 11 with a 16-under-par performance, giving him a three-stroke win over Lee Westwood. The win marked the third Masters victory for Mickelson and his fourth major championship overall. Critical to Mickelson's win was a dramatic run in the third round on Saturday in which Mickelson, trailing leader Westwood by five strokes as he prepared his approach shot to the 13th green, proceeded to make eagle, then to hole-out for eagle from 141 yards at the next hole, the par-4 14th, then on the next, the par-5 15th, to miss eagle from 81 yards by mere inches. After tapping in for birdie at 15, Mickelson, at −12, led Westwood, at −11, who had bogeyed the 12th hole and failed to capitalize on the par-5 13th, settling for par.

Westwood recaptured a one-stroke lead by the end of the round, but the momentum carried forward for Mickelson into round 4, where he posted a bogey-free 67 to Westwood's 71. No other pursuer was able to keep pace to the end, though K. J. Choi and Anthony Kim made notable charges. For good measure, Mickelson birdied the final hole and memorably greeted his waiting wife, Amy, with a prolonged hug and kiss.

For many fans, Mickelson's finish in the tournament was especially poignant, given that Amy had been suffering from breast cancer during the preceding year. Mary Mickelson, Phil's mother, was also dealing with cancer. CBS Sports announcer Jim Nantz's call of the final birdie putt, "That's a win for the family," was seen by many as capturing the moment well.

Tiger Woods had a dramatic return to competitive play after a scandal-ridden 20-week absence; he was in close contention throughout for the lead and finished tied with Choi for 4th at −11. Mickelson and others showed exciting play over the weekend, and the 2010 Masters had strong television ratings in the United States, ranking third all-time to Woods's historic wins in 1997 and 2001. Mickelson's win left him second only to Woods in major championships among his competitive contemporaries, moving him ahead of Ernie Els, Vijay Singh, and Pádraig Harrington, with three major championships each.

Mickelson, one of the favorites for the U.S. Open at Pebble Beach, shot 75 and 66 on Thursday and Friday to sit two shots off the lead. However, two weekend scores of 73 gave him a T4 finish. During the remainder of the 2010 season, Mickelson had multiple opportunities to become the number one player in the world rankings following the travails of Tiger Woods. However, a string of disappointing finishes by Mickelson saw the number one spot eventually go to Englishman Lee Westwood.

=== 2011–2013 ===
Mickelson started his 2011 season at the Farmers Insurance Open at Torrey Pines Golf Course. He shot 67–69–68 and was tied for the 54 hole lead with Bill Haas. Mickelson needed to hole out on the 18th hole for eagle from 74 yards to force a playoff with Bubba Watson. He hit it to 4 feet and Watson won the tournament. On April 3, Mickelson won the Shell Houston Open with a 20-under-par, three-stroke win over Scott Verplank. Mickelson rose to No. 3 in the world ranking, while Tiger Woods fell to No. 7. Mickelson had not been ranked above Woods since the week prior to the 1997 Masters Tournament. At The Open Championship, Mickelson recorded just his second top-ten finish in 18 tournaments by tying for second with Dustin Johnson. His front nine 30 put him briefly in a tie for the lead with eventual champion Darren Clarke. However, putting problems caused him to fade from contention toward the end, to finish in a tie for second place.

Mickelson made his 2012 debut at the Humana Challenge and finished tied for 49th. He missed the cut at the Farmers Insurance Open after shooting rounds of 77 and 68. In the final round of the AT&T Pebble Beach National Pro-Am, Mickelson rallied from six shots back, winning the tournament by two strokes with a final-round score of 8-under 64 and a four-round total of 269. The win marked his 40th career victory on the PGA Tour. The following week at Riviera Country Club, Mickelson lost the Northern Trust Open in a three-way playoff. He had held the lead or a share of it from day one until the back nine on Sunday when Bill Haas posted the clubhouse lead at seven under par. Mickelson holed a 27-foot birdie putt on the final regulation hole to force a playoff alongside Haas and Keegan Bradley. Haas however won the playoff with a 40-foot birdie putt on the second playoff hole. The second-place finish moved Mickelson back into the world's top 10.

Mickelson finished tied for third at the Masters. After opening the tournament with a two-over-par 74, he shot 68–66 in the next two rounds and ended up one stroke behind leader Peter Hanson by Saturday night. Mickelson had a poor start to his fourth round, scoring a triple-bogey when he hit his ball far to the left of the green on the par-3 4th hole, hitting the stand and landing in a bamboo plant. This ended up being Mickelson's only score over par in the whole round, and he ended with a score of eight-under overall. Earlier in the tournament, he received widespread praise for being present to watch Jack Nicklaus, Arnold Palmer, and Gary Player hit the ceremonial opening tee-shots, nearly seven hours before Mickelson's own tee time.

Mickelson made a charge during the final round at the HP Byron Nelson Championship, but bogeyed the 17th and 18th, finishing T-7th. He then withdrew from the Memorial Tournament, citing mental fatigue, after a first-round 79. Mickelson was paired with Tiger Woods and Bubba Watson at the U.S. Open. He fought to make the cut and finished T-65th. After taking a couple of weeks off, he played in the Greenbrier Classic. Putting problems meant a second straight missed cut at the Greenbrier and a third missed cut at 2012 Open Championship, shooting 73-78 (11 over par). He finished T-43rd at the WGC-Bridgestone Invitational. He then finished T-36th at the PGA Championship.

To start the 2012 FedEx Cup Playoffs, Mickelson finished T38 at The Barclays, +1 for the tournament. He tied with Tiger Woods, Zach Johnson, and five other players. In this tournament, he started using the claw putting grip on the greens. At the next event, the Deutsche Bank Championship, he finished the tournament with a −14, tied for 4th with Dustin Johnson. At the BMW Championship, Mickelson posted a −16 for the first three rounds, one of those rounds being a −8, 64. On the final day, Mickelson shot a −2, 70, to finish tied for 2nd, with Lee Westwood, two shots behind leader, and back-to-back winner, Rory McIlroy. At the Tour Championship, he ended up finishing tied for 15th. He went on to have a 3–1 record at the Ryder Cup; however, the USA team lost the event.

Mickelson began the 2013 season in January by playing in the Humana Challenge, where he finished T37 at −17. His next event was the following week in his home event near San Diego at the Farmers Insurance Open. Mickelson endured a disappointing tournament, finishing T51, shooting all four rounds in the 70s. In the first round of the Waste Management Phoenix Open, Mickelson tied his career-low round of 60. He made seven birdies in his first nine holes and needed a birdie on the 18th hole to equal the PGA Tour record of 59. However, his 25-foot birdie putt on the final hole lipped out, resulting in him missing out by a single shot on making only the sixth round of 59 in PGA Tour history. Mickelson led the tournament wire-to-wire and completed a four-shot win over Brandt Snedeker for his 41st PGA Tour victory and 3rd Phoenix Open title. Mickelson's score of 28-under-par tied Mark Calcavecchia's tournament scoring record. He also moved back inside the world's top 10 after falling down as far as number 22.

At the U.S. Open at Merion in 2013, Mickelson entered the final round leading by one stroke after rounds of 67-72-70 (−1) over the first three days, but he started the final round by three-putting the 3rd and 5th holes for double-bogeys to fall out of the lead. He regained the lead at the par-4 10th when he holed his second shot from the rough for an eagle. However, a misjudgment at the short par-3 13th saw him fly the green and make a bogey to slip one behind leader Justin Rose. Another bogey followed at the 15th, before narrowly missing a birdie putt on the 16th that would have tied Rose. Mickelson could not make a birdie at the 17th and after a blocked drive on the 18th, he could not hole his pitch from short of the green, which led to a final bogey. Mickelson ended up finishing tied for second with Jason Day, two strokes behind Justin Rose. It was the sixth runner-up finish of Mickelson's career at the U.S. Open, an event record and only behind Jack Nicklaus's seven runner-up finishes at The Open Championship. After the event, Mickelson called the loss heartbreaking and said "this is tough to swallow after coming so close... I felt like this was as good an opportunity I could ask for and to not get it... it hurts."

The week before The Open Championship, Mickelson warmed up for the event by winning his first tournament on British soil at the Scottish Open on July 14, after a sudden-death playoff against Branden Grace. After this victory, Mickelson spoke of his confidence ahead of his participation in the following week's major championship. Mickelson said: "I've never felt more excited going into The Open. I don't think there's a better way to get ready for a major than playing well the week before and getting into contention. Coming out on top just gives me more confidence." The following week, Mickelson won his fifth major title on July 21 at the Open Championship (often referred to as the British Open) Muirfield Golf Links in Scotland; the Open Championship is the oldest of the four major tournaments in professional golf. This was the first time in history that anyone had won both the Scottish Open and The Open Championship in the same year. Mickelson birdied four of the last six holes in a brilliant final round of 66 to win the title by three strokes. He shed tears on the 18th green after completing his round. Mickelson later said: "I played arguably the best round of my career, and shot the round of my life. The range of emotions I feel are as far apart as possible after losing the U.S. Open. But you have to be resilient in this game." In an interview before the 2015 Open, Mickelson said, "Two years removed from that win, I still can't believe how much it means to me."

=== 2014–2016 ===
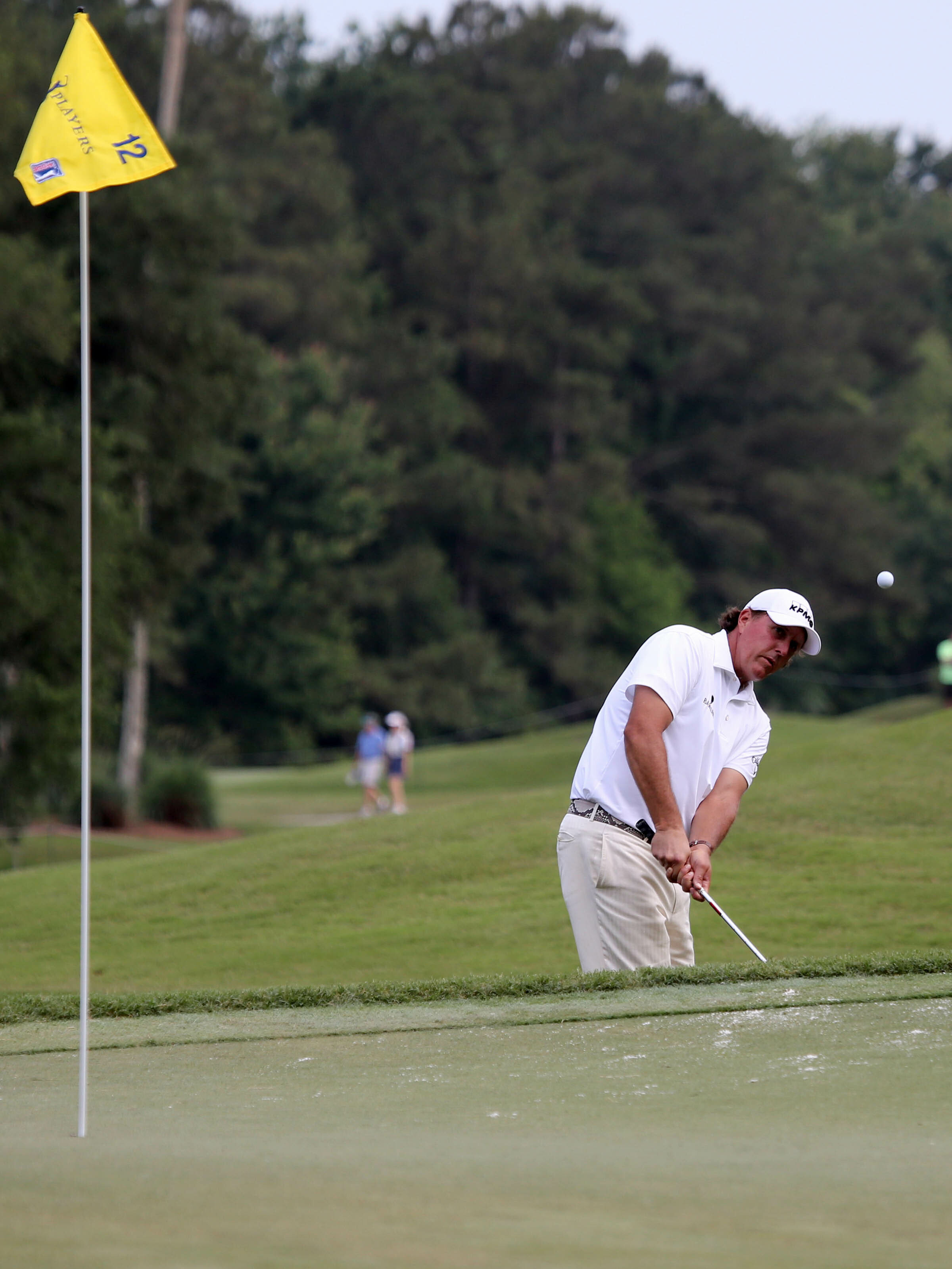
Mickelson at the 2014 Players Championship.

Mickelson missed the cut at the Masters for the first time since 1997. He failed to contend at the U.S. Open at Pinehurst in his first bid to complete the career grand slam. Mickelson's lone top-10 of the PGA Tour season came at the year's final major, the PGA Championship at Valhalla. Mickelson shot rounds of 69-67-67-66 to finish solo second, one shot behind world number one Rory McIlroy.

Prior to the 2015 Masters, Mickelson's best finish in 2015 was a tie for 17th. At the Masters, Mickelson shot rounds of 70-68-67-69 to finish tied for second with Justin Rose, four shots behind champion Jordan Spieth. The second-place finish was Mickelson's tenth such finish in a major, placing him second all-time only to Jack Nicklaus in that regard.

At The Open Championship, Mickelson shot rounds of 70-72-70 and was eight shots behind, outside the top forty. In the final round, Mickelson birdied the 15th hole to move to 10 under and within two of the lead. After a missed 10-foot (3.0 m) birdie putt on 16, Mickelson hit his drive on the infamous Road Hole (17th) at the famed Old Course at St Andrews onto a second-floor balcony of the Old Course Hotel. The out-of-bounds drive lead to a triple-bogey 7 that sent Mickelson tumbling out of contention.

Later in the year, it was announced that Mickelson would leave longtime swing coach Butch Harmon, feeling as though he needed to hear a new perspective on things. After leaving Butch Harmon, Mickelson hired Andrew Getson of Grayhawk Golf Club in Scottsdale, Arizona, to serve as his new swing coach. The two worked together heavily in the 2015 offseason to get Mickelson's swing back. Under Getson's guidance, Mickelson made his 2016 debut at the CareerBuilder Challenge. He shot rounds of 68-65-66-68 to finish in a tie for third place at 21-under-par. It was only Mickelson's fifth top-five finish since his win at the 2013 Open Championship. The third-place finish was Mickelson's highest finish in his first worldwide start of a calendar year since he won the same event to begin the 2004 season. At the AT&T Pebble Beach Pro-Am, Mickelson shot rounds of 68-65-66-72 to finish in solo second place, a shot behind Vaughn Taylor. Mickelson lipped out a five-foot birdie putt to force a playoff on the 72nd hole. He entered the final round with a two-stroke lead, his first 54-hole lead since the 2013 U.S. Open and was seeking to end a winless drought dating back 52 worldwide events to the 2013 Open Championship.

Mickelson shot a 63 in the opening round of The Open Championship at Royal Troon. The round set a new course record and matched the previous major championship record for lowest round. Mickelson had a 15-foot (4.6 m) birdie putt that narrowly missed on the final hole to set a new major championship scoring record of 62. He followed this up with a 69 in the second round for a 10 under par total and a one-shot lead over Henrik Stenson going into the weekend. In the third round, Mickelson shot a one-under 70 for a total of 11 under par to enter the final round one shot back of Stenson. Despite Mickelson's bogey-free 65 in the final round, Stenson shot 63 to win by three shots. Mickelson finished 11 strokes clear of 3rd place, a major championship record for a runner-up. Mickelson's 267 total set a record score for a runner-up in the British Open, and only trails Mickelson's 266 at the 2001 PGA Championship as the lowest total by a runner-up in major championship history.

=== 2017–2019 ===
In the fall of 2016, Mickelson had two sports hernia surgeries. Those in the golf community expected him to miss much time recovering, however his unexpected return at the CareerBuilder Challenge was a triumphant one, leading to a T-21 finish. The next week, in San Diego, he narrowly missed an eagle putt on the 18th hole on Sunday that would have got him to 8-under par instead posting −7 (71-72-67-71) to finish T14 at the Farmers Insurance Open. The following week, at the Waste Management Phoenix Open, which he has won three times, he surged into contention following a Saturday 65. He played his first nine holes in 4-under 32 and sending his name to the top of the leaderboard. However, his charge faltered with bogeys at 11, 12, 14, 15, and a double bogey at the driveable 17th hole. He stumbled with a final round 71, still earning a T-16 finish, for his sixth straight top-25 finish on tour.

Mickelson came close to winning again at the FedEx St. Jude Classic where he had finished in second place the previous year to Daniel Berger. He started the final round four strokes behind leaders but he quickly played himself into contention. Following a birdie at the 10th hole he vaulted to the top of leaderboard but found trouble on the 12th hole. His tee shot carried out of bounds and his fourth shot hit the water, so he had to make a long putt to salvage triple-bogey. He managed to get one shot back, but he finished three shots behind winner Berger, in ninth place, for the second straight year.

Two weeks later he withdrew from the U.S. Open to attend his daughter's high school graduation. A week later, his longtime caddie Jim (Bones) Mackay left Mickelson in a mutual agreement. Mickelson then missed the cut at both The Open Championship and the PGA Championship. On September 6, days after posting his best finish of the season of T6 at the Dell Technologies Championship, Mickelson was named as a captain's pick for the Presidents Cup. This maintained a streak of 23 consecutive USA teams in the Presidents Cup and Ryder Cup, dating back to 1994.

On March 4, 2018, Mickelson ended a winless drought that dated back to 2013, by capturing his third WGC championship at the WGC-Mexico Championship, with a final-round score of 66 and a total score of −16. Mickelson birdied two of his last four holes and had a lengthy putt to win outright on the 72nd hole, but tied with Justin Thomas. He defeated Thomas on the first extra hole of a sudden-death playoff with a par. After Thomas had flown the green, Mickelson had a birdie to win the playoff which lipped out. Thomas however could not get up and down for par, meaning Mickelson claimed the championship. The win was Mickelson's 43rd on the PGA Tour and his first since winning the 2013 Open Championship. He also became the oldest winner of a WGC event, at age 47.

In the third round of the 2018 U.S. Open, Mickelson incurred a two-stroke penalty in a controversial incident on the 13th hole when he hit his ball with intent while it was still moving. He ended up shooting 81 (+11). His former coach Butch Harmon thought Mickelson should have been disqualified.

Mickelson was a captain's pick for Team USA at the 2018 Ryder Cup, held in Paris between September 28 and 30. Paired with Bryson DeChambeau in the Friday afternoon foursomes, they lost 5 and 4 to Europe's Sergio García and Alex Norén. In the Sunday singles match, Mickelson lost 4 and 2 to Francesco Molinari, as Team USA slumped to a 17.5 to 10.5 defeat.

On November 23, 2018, Mickelson won the pay-per-view event, Capital One's The Match. This was a $9,000,000 winner-takes-all match against Tiger Woods at Shadow Creek Golf Course in Las Vegas. Mickelson needed four extra holes to beat Woods, which he did by holing a four-foot putt after Woods missed a seven-foot putt on the 22nd hole.

In his third start of the 2019 calendar year, Mickelson won the AT&T Pebble Beach Pro-Am, shooting a bogey-free final round 65 to defeat Paul Casey by three strokes. The win was Mickelson's 44th career title on the PGA Tour, and his fifth at Pebble Beach, tying Mark O'Meara for most victories in the event. At 48 years of age, he also became the oldest winner of that event.

=== 2020: PGA Tour Champions debut ===
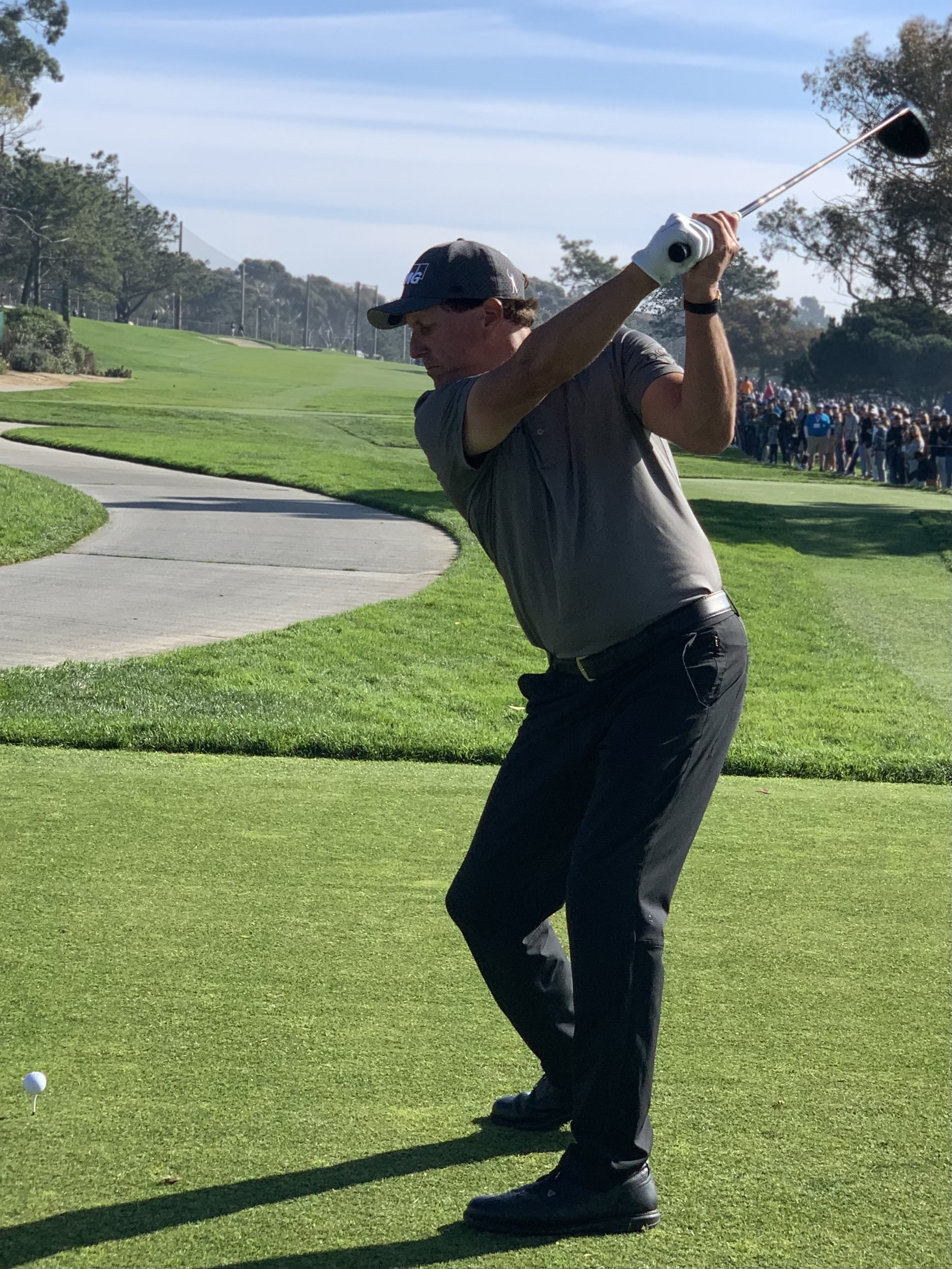
Mickelson at Torrey Pines in January 2020

In December 2019, Mickelson announced via Twitter that "after turning down opportunities to go to the Middle East for many years" he would play in the 2020 Saudi International tournament on the European Tour and would miss Waste Management Phoenix Open for the first time since 1989. However, his decision to visit and play in Saudi Arabia was widely criticized for ignoring the continuous human rights abuses in the nation. Mickelson went on to finish the February 2020 event tied for third.

Mickelson finished 3rd at the 2020 AT&T Pebble Beach Pro-Am and tied for 2nd in the WGC-FedEx St. Jude Invitational. Mickelson was the first player over 50 to finish in the top five of a World Golf Championship event. He was ultimately eliminated from the FedEx Cup Playoffs following The Northern Trust at TPC Boston in August 2020. One week later, Mickelson made his debut on the PGA Tour Champions. He won the Charles Schwab Series at Ozarks National in his first tournament after becoming eligible for PGA Tour Champions on his 50th birthday on June 16, 2020. He was the 20th player to win their debut tournament on tour. Mickelson's 191 stroke total tied the PGA Tour Champions all-time record for a three-day event.

In October 2020, Mickelson won the Dominion Energy Charity Classic in Virginia. It was his second win in as many starts on the PGA Tour Champions.

=== 2021: The oldest major champion ===
In February 2021, Mickelson was attempting to become the first player in PGA Tour Champions history to win his first three tournaments on tour. However, he fell short in the Cologuard Classic, finishing in a T-20 position with a score of 4 under par.

In May 2021, Mickelson held the 54-hole lead at the PGA Championship at the Kiawah Island Golf Resort in South Carolina, leading Brooks Koepka by one shot with one day to play. He shot a final-round 73 to capture the tournament, defeating Koepka and Louis Oosthuizen by two strokes, becoming the oldest major champion; at 50. As Mickelson walked down the fairway following an excellent second shot from the left rough on the 18th hole, thousands of fans engulfed him, with him walking towards the hole constantly tipping his hat and giving the thumbs up to the crowd as they cheered. However, the massive tumult of people meant playing partner Brooks Koepka was stranded in the sea of people, and with difficulties, he managed to reach the green to finish the hole. Mickelson eventually emerged from the crowd and two-putted for par, finishing the tournament at 6-under, besting the field by two strokes.

In October 2021, Mickelson won for the third time in four career starts on the PGA Tour Champions. Mickelson shot a final round 4-under-par 68 to win the inaugural Constellation Furyk & Friends over Miguel Ángel Jiménez in Jacksonville, Florida. In November 2021, Mickelson won the season-ending Charles Schwab Cup Championship in Phoenix, Arizona, with a final round six-under par 65. This victory was Mickelson's fourth win in six career starts on PGA Tour Champions.

=== 2022 – present: LIV Golf ===
Mickelson told a journalist that despite Saudi Arabians being "scary motherfuckers" who had murdered journalist Jamal Khashoggi and executed gay people, he supported the Saudi-backed LIV Golf because it offered an opportunity to reshape the PGA Tour. In response to these comments, Mickelson lost sponsors Amstel Light and KPMG. Mickelson announced he would be stepping away from golf to spend time with his family and would miss the 2022 Masters Tournament. In May, he also decided to withdraw from the PGA Championship which he won in 2021. On June 6, 2022, LIV Golf CEO Greg Norman announced that Mickelson will play in the first event on the LIV Golf Invitational Series beginning on June 9, 2022. On June 9, 2022, the first day of the LIV Golf Invitational London, the PGA Tour suspended Mickelson and 16 other current and former tour members for participating in a conflicting event without permission from the tour.

At the 2023 Masters Tournament, Mickelson began the final day ten shots off of the lead, and finished in tied second. Shooting a 65, Mickelson equaled his lowest score at Augusta almost 27 years earlier. In the last seven holes, he scored five birdies and two pars. At the 2023 PGA Championship at Oak Hill, Mickelson narrowly avoided a penalty at the 6th hole for making an improper drop. He and playing partner, Rickie Fowler were seemingly unaware of a rule change made earlier in 2023. Mickelson was ultimately saved a stroke and said he was "appreciative" of a rules official who had corrected him. Mickelson missed the first two LIV events of the season in 2026. He also withdrew from the PGA Championship.

== Playing style ==
As a competitor, Mickelson's playing style is described by many as "aggressive" and highly social. His strategy toward difficult shots (bad lies, obstructions) would tend to be considered risky.

Mickelson has also been characterized by his powerful and sometimes inaccurate driver, but his excellent short game draws the most positive reviews, most of all his daring "Phil flop" shot in which a big swing with a high-lofted wedge against a tight lie flies a ball high into the air for a short distance.

In his prime, Mickelson was usually in the top 10 in scoring, and he led the PGA Tour in birdie average as recently as 2013.

== Awards and recognition ==
Mickelson was inducted into the National Italian American Sports Hall of Fame in 2008.

== Endorsements, media, and business ==
Although ranked second on the PGA Tour's all-time money list of tournament prize money won, Mickelson earns far more from endorsements than from prize money. According to one estimate of 2011 earnings (comprising salary, winnings, bonuses, endorsements, and appearances), Mickelson was then the second-highest paid athlete in the United States, earning an income of over $62 million, $53 million of which came from endorsements. In 2015, Forbes estimated Mickelson's annual income was $51 million. Major companies which Mickelson currently endorses are ExxonMobil (Mickelson and wife Amy started a teacher sponsorship fund with the company), Rolex, and Mizzen+Main. Mickelson's sponsorship with Callaway Golf is currently "paused" and will be re-evaluated at a later date. After being diagnosed with psoriatic arthritis in 2010, Mickelson was treated with Enbrel and began endorsing the drug. He has been previously sponsored by Titleist, KPMG, Workday, Bearing Point, Barclays, Amstel Light and Ford.

He appeared as himself in a non-speaking role in the 1996 film Tin Cup, starring Kevin Costner.

He is the co-founder of For Wellness with Dave Phillips, which sells functional food and beverage products, including the supplement that Mickelson adds to his coffee.

== Personal life ==
=== Health ===
In 2010, in the days leading up to the PGA Championship at Whistling Straits, Mickelson announced he had been diagnosed with psoriatic arthritis. He added that he had started medical treatment and had become a vegetarian in hopes of aiding his recovery. He maintained that both his short- and long-term prognosis were good, that the condition should have no long-term effect on his golfing career, and that he felt well. He also stated that the arthritis may go into permanent remission after one year of medical treatment. He went on to finish the championship T12, five shots behind winner Martin Kaymer.

In a Men's Vogue article, Mickelson recounted his effort to lose twenty pounds (9.1 kg) with the help of trainer Sean Cochran. "Once the younger players started to come on tour, he realized that he had to start working out to maintain longevity in his career," Cochran said. Mickelson's regimen consisted of increasing flexibility and power, eating five smaller meals a day, aerobic training, and carrying his own golf bag.

On April 2, 2026, Mickelson announced he will miss the Masters "as my family continues to navigate a personal health matter."

=== Political views ===
In 2022, Mickelson lost a significant number of sponsors including KPMG, Amstel Light, and Workday after comments he made about the Saudi-backed golf league, LIV Golf. In an interview, he stated that Saudis are "scary motherfuckers to get involved with... We know they killed [Washington Post reporter and U.S. resident Jamal] Khashoggi and have a horrible record on human rights. They execute people over there for being gay. Knowing all of this, why would I even consider it? Because this is a once-in-a-lifetime opportunity to reshape how the PGA Tour operates."

He has made remarks in response to congresswoman Ilhan Omar's commentary about Charlie Kirk. Mickelson posted on X: "Ilhan spews hate every time she opens her mouth, she came here fraudulently and will hopefully be sent back to Somalia soon."

=== Insider trading settlement ===
On May 30, 2014, The Wall Street Journal reported that the FBI and U.S. Securities and Exchange Commission (SEC) were investigating Mickelson and associates of his for insider trading in Clorox and Dean Foods stock. Mickelson denied any wrongdoing. The initial investigation concluded without any charges related to Clorox. However, Mickelson was still under investigation for trades in Dean Foods from which he profited more than $931,000. On May 19, 2016, Mickelson was named as a relief defendant in a SEC complaint alleging insider trading but avoided criminal charges in a parallel case brought in the Federal District Court for the Southern District of New York. The action results from trades in Dean Foods in 2012 in conjunction with confidential information provided by Thomas Davis, a former director of Dean Foods Company, who tipped his friend and "professional sports bettor" Billy Walters.

The SEC alleged that Walters told Mickelson material, nonpublic information about Dean Foods, and the SEC fined Mickelson the equivalent of the $931,000 profit he made from trading Dean Foods stock as well as interest of $105,000. In 2017, Walters was convicted of making $40 million on Davis's private information from 2008 to 2014 by a federal jury. At that time, it was also noted that Mickelson had "once owed nearly $2 million in gambling debts to" Walters.

=== Misconduct allegations ===
In June 2026, Mickelson's membership at The Farms, a club in Rancho Santa Fe, California was revoked due to alleged misconduct with a female employee at the club. Longtime golf reporter Alan Shipnuck published an article documenting the numerous allegations against Mickelson. The report quoted multiple women accusing Mickelson of making unwanted sexual advances and even displaying behavior that could be considered "grooming." One of those women was the ex-wife of fellow golfer Pat Perez, who claimed Mickelson showed her naked full-body photos of himself and asked her to come to his room when Perez was asleep. Mickelson has disputed the allegations and criticized Shipnuck.

== Amateur wins ==
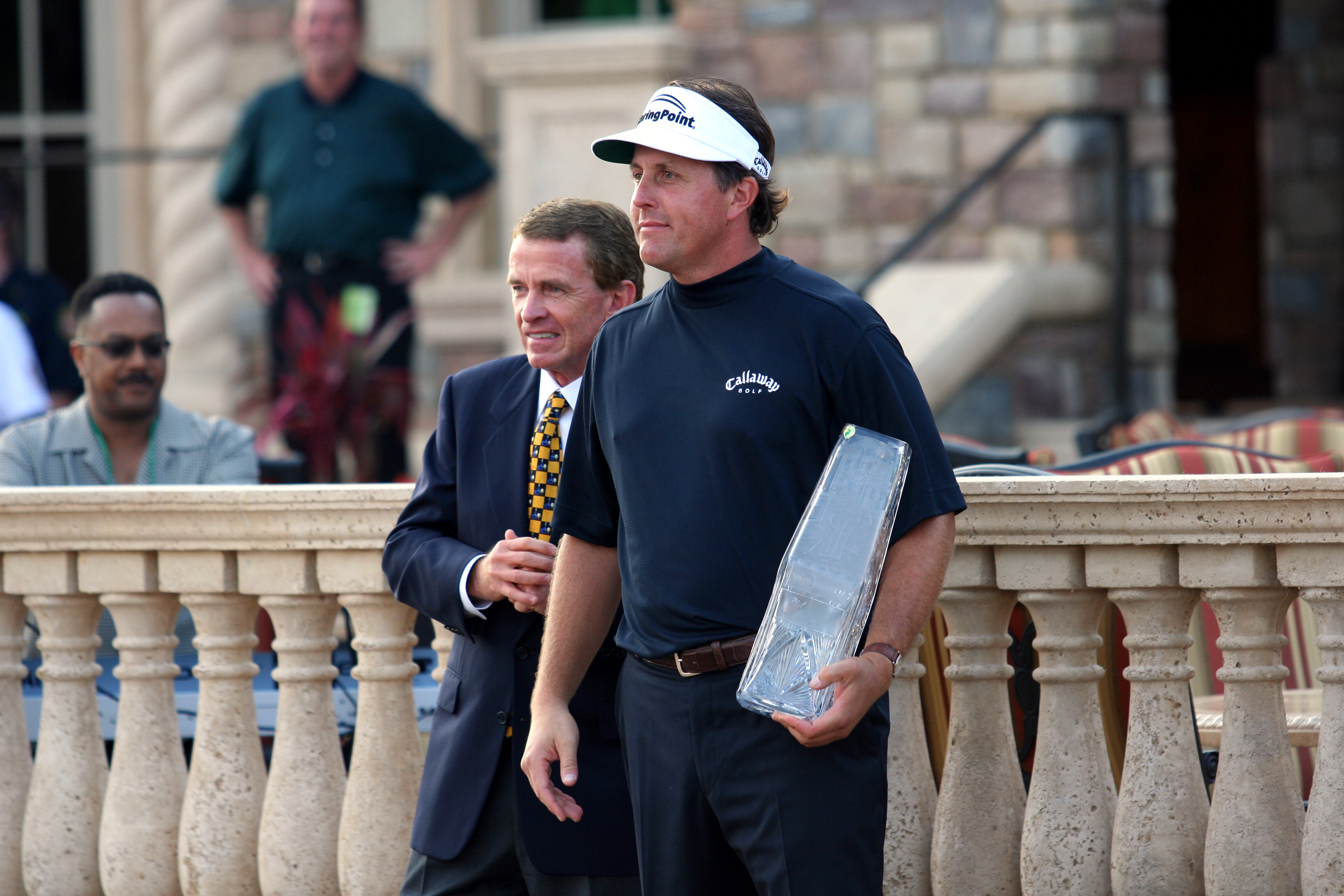
Mickelson with commissioner Tim Finchem after winning the 2007 Players Championship

- 1980 Junior World Golf Championships (Boys 9–10)
- 1989-1992 12 additional collegiate events
- 1989 NCAA Division I Championship
- 1990 Pac-10 Championship, NCAA Division I Championship, U.S. Amateur, Porter Cup
- 1991 Western Amateur
- 1992 NCAA Division I Championship

== Professional wins (57) ==
=== PGA Tour wins (45) ===
Legend
Major championships (6)
Players Championships (1)
World Golf Championships (2)
Tour Championships/FedEx Cup playoff events (3)
Other PGA Tour (33)

No.	Date	Tournament	Winning score	Margin of victory	Runner(s)-up
1	Jan 13, 1991	Northern Telecom Open (as an amateur)	−16 (65-71-65-71=272)	1 stroke	(United States) Tom Purtzer, (United States) Bob Tway
2	Feb 21, 1993	Buick Invitational of California	−10 (75-69-69-65=278)	4 strokes	(United States) Dave Rummells
3	Aug 22, 1993	The International	45 pts (11-7-11-16=45)	8 points	(United States) Mark Calcavecchia
4	Jan 9, 1994	Mercedes Championships	−12 (70-68-70-68=276)	Playoff	(United States) Fred Couples
5	Jan 22, 1995	Northern Telecom Open (2)	−19 (65-66-70-68=269)	1 stroke	(United States) Jim Gallagher Jr., (United States) Scott Simpson
6	Jan 14, 1996	Nortel Open (3)	−14 (69-66-71-67=273)	2 strokes	(United States) Bob Tway
7	Jan 27, 1996	Phoenix Open	−15 (69-67-66-67=269)	Playoff	(United States) Justin Leonard
8	May 12, 1996	GTE Byron Nelson Golf Classic	−15 (67-65-67-66=265)	2 strokes	(Australia) Craig Parry
9	Aug 25, 1996	NEC World Series of Golf	−6 (70-66-68-70=274)	3 strokes	(United States) Billy Mayfair, (United States) Steve Stricker, (United States) Duffy Waldorf
10	Mar 23, 1997	Bay Hill Invitational	−16 (72-65-70-65=272)	3 strokes	(Australia) Stuart Appleby
11	Aug 3, 1997	Sprint International (2)	48 pts (14-13-12-9=48)	7 points	(Australia) Stuart Appleby
12	Jan 11, 1998	Mercedes Championships (2)	−17 (68-67-68-68=271)	1 stroke	(United States) Mark O'Meara, (United States) Tiger Woods
13	Aug 17, 1998	AT&T Pebble Beach National Pro-Am	−14 (65-70-67=202)*	1 stroke	(United States) Tom Pernice Jr.
14	Feb 13, 2000	Buick Invitational (2)	−18 (66-67-67-70=270)	4 strokes	(Japan) Shigeki Maruyama, (United States) Tiger Woods
15	Apr 2, 2000	BellSouth Classic	−11 (67-69-69=205)*	Playoff	(United States) Gary Nicklaus
16	May 21, 2000	MasterCard Colonial	−12 (67-68-70-63=268)	2 strokes	(United States) Stewart Cink, (United States) Davis Love III
17	Nov 5, 2000	The Tour Championship	−13 (67-69-65-66=267)	2 strokes	(United States) Tiger Woods
18	Feb 11, 2001	Buick Invitational (3)	−19 (68-64-71-66=269)	Playoff	(United States) Frank Lickliter, (United States) Davis Love III
19	Jul 1, 2001	Canon Greater Hartford Open	−16 (67-68-61-68=264)	1 stroke	(United States) Billy Andrade
20	Jan 20, 2002	Bob Hope Chrysler Classic	−30 (64-67-70-65-64=330)	Playoff	(United States) David Berganio Jr.
21	Jun 23, 2002	Canon Greater Hartford Open(2)	−14 (69-67-66-64=264)	1 stroke	(United States) Jonathan Kaye, (United States) Davis Love III
22	Jan 25, 2004	Bob Hope Chrysler Classic (2)	−30 (68-63-64-67-68=330)	Playoff	(United States) Skip Kendall
23	Apr 11, 2004	Masters Tournament	−9 (72-69-69-69=279)	1 stroke	(South Africa) Ernie Els
24	Feb 6, 2005	FBR Open (2)	−17 (73-60-66-68=267)	5 strokes	(United States) Scott McCarron, (United States) Kevin Na
25	Feb 13, 2005	AT&T Pebble Beach National Pro-Am (2)	−19 (62-67-67-73=269)	4 strokes	(Canada) Mike Weir
26	Apr 4, 2005	BellSouth Classic (2)	−8 (74-65-69=208)*	Playoff	(India) Arjun Atwal, (United States) Rich Beem, (United States) Brandt Jobe, (Spain) José María Olazábal
27	Aug 15, 2005	PGA Championship	−4 (67-65-72-72=276)	1 stroke	(Denmark) Thomas Bjørn, (Australia) Steve Elkington
28	Apr 2, 2006	BellSouth Classic (3)	−28 (63-65-67-65=260)	13 strokes	(United States) Zach Johnson, (Spain) José María Olazábal
29	Apr 9, 2006	Masters Tournament (2)	−7 (70-72-70-69=281)	2 strokes	(South Africa) Tim Clark
30	Feb 11, 2007	AT&T Pebble Beach National Pro-Am (3)	−20 (65-67-70-66=268)	5 strokes	(United States) Kevin Sutherland
31	May 13, 2007	The Players Championship	−11 (67-72-69-69=277)	2 strokes	(Spain) Sergio García
32	Sep 3, 2007	Deutsche Bank Championship	−16 (70-64-68-66=268)	2 strokes	(United States) Arron Oberholser, (United States) Brett Wetterich, (United States) Tiger Woods
33	Feb 17, 2008	Northern Trust Open	−12 (68-64-70-70=272)	2 strokes	(United States) Jeff Quinney
34	May 26, 2008	Crowne Plaza Invitational at Colonial (2)	−14 (65-68-65-68=266)	1 stroke	(South Africa) Tim Clark, (Australia) Rod Pampling
35	Feb 22, 2009	Northern Trust Open (2)	−15 (63-72-62-72=269)	1 stroke	(United States) Steve Stricker
36	Mar 15, 2009	WGC-CA Championship	−19 (65-66-69-69=269)	1 stroke	(United States) Nick Watney
37	Sep 27, 2009	The Tour Championship (2)	−9 (73-67-66-65=271)	3 strokes	(United States) Tiger Woods
38	Apr 11, 2010	Masters Tournament (3)	−16 (67-71-67-67=272)	3 strokes	(England) Lee Westwood
39	Apr 3, 2011	Shell Houston Open	−20 (70-70-63-65=268)	3 strokes	(United States) Chris Kirk, (United States) Scott Verplank
40	Feb 12, 2012	AT&T Pebble Beach National Pro-Am (4)	−17 (70-65-70-64=269)	2 strokes	(South Korea) Charlie Wi
41	Feb 3, 2013	Waste Management Phoenix Open (3)	−28 (60-65-64-67=256)	4 strokes	(United States) Brandt Snedeker
42	Jul 21, 2013	The Open Championship	−3 (69-74-72-66=281)	3 strokes	(Sweden) Henrik Stenson
43	Mar 4, 2018	WGC-Mexico Championship (2)	−16 (69-68-65-66=268)	Playoff	(United States) Justin Thomas
44	Feb 11, 2019	AT&T Pebble Beach Pro-Am (5)	−19 (65-68-70-65=268)	3 strokes	(England) Paul Casey
45	May 23, 2021	PGA Championship (2)	−6 (70-69-70-73=282)	2 strokes	(United States) Brooks Koepka, (South Africa) Louis Oosthuizen

*Note: Tournament shortened to 54 holes due to weather.

PGA Tour playoff record (8–4)

No.	Year	Tournament	Opponent(s)	Result
1	1994	Mercedes Championships	(United States) Fred Couples	Won with par on second extra hole
2	1996	Phoenix Open	(United States) Justin Leonard	Won with birdie on third extra hole
3	2000	BellSouth Classic	(United States) Gary Nicklaus	Won with birdie on first extra hole
4	2000	GTE Byron Nelson Classic	(United States) Davis Love III, (Sweden) Jesper Parnevik	Parnevik won with par on third extra hole Mickelson eliminated by birdie on second hole
5	2001	Buick Invitational	(United States) Frank Lickliter, (United States) Davis Love III	Won with double-bogey on third extra hole Love eliminated by par on second hole
6	2002	Bob Hope Chrysler Classic	(United States) David Berganio Jr.	Won with birdie on first extra hole
7	2004	Bob Hope Chrysler Classic	(United States) Skip Kendall	Won with birdie on first extra hole
8	2005	BellSouth Classic	(India) Arjun Atwal, (United States) Rich Beem, (United States) Brandt Jobe, (Spain) José María Olazábal	Won with birdie on fourth extra hole Olazábal eliminated by par on third hole Atwal and Jobe eliminated by par on first hole
9	2007	Nissan Open	(United States) Charles Howell III	Lost to par on third extra hole
10	2008	FBR Open	(United States) J. B. Holmes	Lost to birdie on first extra hole
11	2012	Northern Trust Open	(United States) Keegan Bradley, (United States) Bill Haas	Haas won with birdie on second extra hole
12	2018	WGC-Mexico Championship	(United States) Justin Thomas	Won with par on first extra hole

=== European Tour wins (11) ===
Legend
Major championships (6)
World Golf Championships (3)
Other European Tour (2)

No.	Date	Tournament	Winning score	Margin of victory	Runner(s)-up
1	Apr 11, 2004	Masters Tournament	−9 (72-69-69-69=279)	1 stroke	(South Africa) Ernie Els
2	Aug 15, 2005	PGA Championship	−4 (67-65-72-72=276)	1 stroke	(Denmark) Thomas Bjørn, (Australia) Steve Elkington
3	Apr 9, 2006	Masters Tournament (2)	−7 (70-72-70-69=281)	2 strokes	(South Africa) Tim Clark
4	Nov 11, 2007 (2008 season)	HSBC Champions^{1}	−10 (68-66-68-76=278)	Playoff	(England) Ross Fisher, (England) Lee Westwood
5	Mar 15, 2009	WGC-CA Championship	−19 (65-66-69-69=269)	1 stroke	(United States) Nick Watney
6	Nov 8, 2009	WGC-HSBC Champions (Note: The 2009 WGC-HSBC Champions was an unofficial PGA Tour event, therefore Mickelson's win is only considered official on the European Tour.) (2)	−17 (69-66-67-69=271)	1 stroke	(South Africa) Ernie Els
7	Apr 11, 2010	Masters Tournament (3)	−16 (67-71-67-67=272)	3 strokes	(England) Lee Westwood
8	Jul 14, 2013	Aberdeen Asset Management Scottish Open	−17 (66-70-66-69=271)	Playoff	(South Africa) Branden Grace
9	Jul 21, 2013	The Open Championship	−3 (69-74-72-66=281)	3 strokes	(Sweden) Henrik Stenson
10	Mar 4, 2018	WGC-Mexico Championship (2)	−16 (69-68-65-66=268)	Playoff	(United States) Justin Thomas
11	May 23, 2021	PGA Championship (2)	−6 (70-69-70-73=282)	2 strokes	(United States) Brooks Koepka, (South Africa) Louis Oosthuizen

^{1}Co-sanctioned by the Asian Tour, Sunshine Tour and PGA Tour of Australasia, but unofficial event on those tours.

European Tour playoff record (3–1)

No.	Year	Tournament	Opponent(s)	Result
1	2007	Barclays Scottish Open	(France) Grégory Havret	Lost to par on first extra hole
2	2007	HSBC Champions	(England) Ross Fisher, (England) Lee Westwood	Won with birdie on second extra hole
3	2013	Aberdeen Asset Management Scottish Open	(South Africa) Branden Grace	Won with birdie on first extra hole
4	2018	WGC-Mexico Championship	(United States) Justin Thomas	Won with par on first extra hole

=== Challenge Tour wins (1) ===
No.	Date	Tournament	Winning score	Margin of victory	Runner-up
1	May 9, 1993	Tournoi Perrier de Paris	−13 (72-71-66-66=275)	1 stroke	(Australia) Steve Elkington

=== Other wins (4) ===
No.	Year	Tournament	Winning score	Margin of victory	Runner-up
1	Jul 9, 1996	Ernst Championship	−9 (68-65=133)	Playoff	(United States) Fred Couples
2	Jul 6, 2004	Telus Skins Game	$140,000	$45,000	(United States) John Daly
3	Nov 24, 2004	PGA Grand Slam of Golf	−17 (68-59=127)	5 strokes	(Fiji) Vijay Singh
4	Nov 23, 2018	The Match: Tiger vs. Phil	22 holes		(United States) Tiger Woods

Other playoff record (1–1)

No.	Year	Tournament	Opponent(s)	Result
1	1994	Fred Meyer Challenge (with (United States) Ben Crenshaw)	(United States) John Cook and (United States) Mark O'Meara	Lost to par on second extra hole
2	1996	Ernst Championship	(United States) Fred Couples	Won with eagle on first extra hole

=== PGA Tour Champions wins (4) ===
Legend
Charles Schwab Cup playoff events (1)
Other PGA Tour Champions (3)

No.	Date	Tournament	Winning score	Margin of victory	Runner-up
1	Aug 26, 2020	Charles Schwab Series at Ozarks National	−22 (61-64-66=191)	4 strokes	(United States) Tim Petrovic
2	Oct 18, 2020	Dominion Energy Charity Classic	−17 (68-66-65=199)	3 strokes	(Canada) Mike Weir
3	Oct 10, 2021	Constellation Furyk and Friends	−15 (66-67-68=201)	2 strokes	(Spain) Miguel Ángel Jiménez
4	Nov 14, 2021	Charles Schwab Cup Championship	−19 (65-67-68-65=265)	1 stroke	(New Zealand) Steven Alker

== Major championships ==
=== Wins (6) ===
Year	Championship	54 holes	Winning score	Margin	Runner(s)-up
2004	Masters Tournament	Tied for lead	−9 (72-69-69-69=279)	1 stroke	(South Africa) Ernie Els
2005	PGA Championship	Tied for lead	−4 (67-65-72-72=276)	1 stroke	(Denmark) Thomas Bjørn, (Australia) Steve Elkington
2006	Masters Tournament (2)	1 shot lead	−7 (70-72-70-69=281)	2 strokes	(South Africa) Tim Clark
2010	Masters Tournament (3)	1 shot deficit	−16 (67-71-67-67=272)	3 strokes	(England) Lee Westwood
2013	The Open Championship	5 shot deficit	−3 (69-74-72-66=281)	3 strokes	(Sweden) Henrik Stenson
2021	PGA Championship (2)	1 shot lead	−6 (70-69-70-73=282)	2 strokes	(United States) Brooks Koepka, (South Africa) Louis Oosthuizen

=== Results timeline ===
Results not in chronological order in 2020.

Tournament	1990	1991	1992	1993	1994	1995	1996	1997	1998	1999
Masters Tournament		T46_{LA}		T34		T7	3	CUT	T12	T6
U.S. Open	T29_{LA}	T55_{LA}	CUT		T47	T4	T94	T43	T10	2
The Open Championship		T73			CUT	T40	T41	T24	79	CUT
PGA Championship				T6	3	CUT	T8	T29	T34	T57

Tournament	2000	2001	2002	2003	2004	2005	2006	2007	2008	2009
Masters Tournament	T7	3	3	3	1	10	1	T24	T5	5
U.S. Open	T16	T7	2	T55	2	T33	T2	CUT	T18	T2
The Open Championship	T11	T30	T66	T59	3	T60	T22	CUT	T19	
PGA Championship	T9	2	T34	T23	T6	1	T16	T32	T7	73

Tournament	2010	2011	2012	2013	2014	2015	2016	2017	2018
Masters Tournament	1	T27	T3	T54	CUT	T2	CUT	T22	T36
U.S. Open	T4	T54	T65	T2	T28	T64	CUT		T48
The Open Championship	T48	T2	CUT	1	T23	T20	2	CUT	T24
PGA Championship	T12	T19	T36	T72	2	T18	T33	CUT	CUT

Tournament	2019	2020	2021	2022	2023	2024	2025
Masters Tournament	T18	T55	T21		T2	T43	CUT
PGA Championship	T71	T71	1		T58	CUT	CUT
U.S. Open	T52	CUT	T62	CUT	CUT	CUT	CUT
The Open Championship	CUT	NT	CUT	CUT	CUT	T60	T56

Win
Top 10
Did not play

LA = low amateur
CUT = missed the half-way cut
"T" = tied
NT = no tournament due to COVID-19 pandemic

=== Summary ===
Tournament	Wins	2nd	3rd	Top-5	Top-10	Top-25	Events	Cuts made
Masters Tournament	3	2	5	12	16	21	32	28
PGA Championship	2	2	1	5	10	15	32	27
U.S. Open	0	6	0	8	10	12	34	26
The Open Championship	1	2	1	4	4	11	31	22
Totals	6	12	7	29	40	59	129	103

- Most consecutive cuts made – 30 (1999 PGA – 2007 Masters)
- Longest streak of top-10s – 5 (2004 Masters – 2005 Masters)

== The Players Championship ==
=== Wins (1) ===
Year	Championship	54 holes	Winning score	Margin	Runner-up
2007	The Players Championship	1 shot deficit	−11 (67-72-69-69=277)	2 strokes	(Spain) Sergio García

=== Results timeline ===
Tournament	1992	1993	1994	1995	1996	1997	1998	1999
The Players Championship	CUT	CUT		T14	T33	CUT	T8	T32

Tournament	2000	2001	2002	2003	2004	2005	2006	2007	2008	2009
The Players Championship	CUT	T33	T28		T3	T40	T14	1	T21	T55

Tournament	2010	2011	2012	2013	2014	2015	2016	2017	2018	2019
The Players Championship	T17	T33	T25	CUT	CUT	CUT	CUT	T41	CUT	CUT

Tournament	2020	2021
The Players Championship	C	T35

Win
Top 10
Did not play

CUT = missed the halfway cut
"T" indicates a tie for a place
C = Canceled after the first round due to the COVID-19 pandemic

== World Golf Championships ==
=== Wins (3) ===
Year	Championship	54 holes	Winning score	Margin	Runner-up
2009	WGC-CA Championship	Tied for lead	−19 (65-66-69-69=269)	1 stroke	(United States) Nick Watney
2009	WGC-HSBC Champions	2 shot lead	−17 (69-66-67-69=271)	1 stroke	(South Africa) Ernie Els
2018	WGC-Mexico Championship (2)	2 shot deficit	−16 (69-68-65-66=268)	Playoff	(United States) Justin Thomas

=== Results timeline ===
Results not in chronological order prior to 2015.

Tournament	1999	2000	2001	2002	2003	2004	2005	2006	2007	2008	2009	2010	2011	2012	2013	2014	2015	2016	2017	2018	2019
Championship	T40		NT^{1}	T23	T38		T29		T23	T20	1	T14	T55	T43	T3	T16	T31	5	T7	1	T39
Match Play	R16	R64		R64	R16	QF	R16	R16	R32	R32	R16		R32					T18	QF	T17	T40
Invitational	2	T4	T8	T9	T23	T43	T51	T54	T46	T4	T58	T46	T48	T43	T21	T15	T63	T27	T39	T24	57
Champions											1	T41		T2	14				T15		T28

Tournament	2020	2021
Championship		
Match Play	NT^{2}	
Invitational	T2	T17
Champions	NT^{2}	NT^{2}

^{1}Cancelled due to 9/11
^{2}Cancelled due to COVID-19 pandemic

Win
Top 10
Did not play

QF, R16, R32, R64 = Round in which player lost in match play
"T" = tied
NT = No Tournament
Note that the HSBC Champions did not become a WGC event until 2009.

== PGA Tour career summary ==
Season	Wins (Majors)	Earnings ($)	Rank
1991	1	0^{†}	—N/a
1992	0	171,714	90
1993	2	628,735	22
1994	1	748,316	15
1995	1	655,777	28
1996	4	1,697,799	2
1997	2	1,225,390	11
1998	2	1,837,246	6
1999	0	1,722,681	14
2000	4	4,746,457	2
2001	2	4,403,833	2
2002	2	4,311,971	2
2003	0	1,623,137	38
2004	2 (1)	5,784,823	3
2005	4 (1)	5,699,605	3
2006	2 (1)	4,256,505	6
2007	3	5,819,988	2
2008	2	5,118,875	3
2009	3	5,332,755	3
2010	1 (1)	3,821,733	6
2011	1	3,763,488	12
2012	1	4,203,821	8
2013	2 (1)	5,495,793	4
2014	0	2,158,019	38
2015	0	2,154,200	38
2016	0	4,022,628	12
2017	0	2,102,599	45
2018	1	4,595,187	13
2019	1	2,440,221	39
2020	0	1,493,908	60
2021	1 (1)	2,707,199	70
Career*	45 (6)	94,814,452	2

* As of 2021 season.
^{†} Mickelson won as an amateur in 1991 and therefore did not receive any prize money.

== U.S. national team appearances ==
Amateur

- Walker Cup: 1989, 1991 (winners)
- Eisenhower Trophy: 1990

Professional

- Presidents Cup: 1994 (winners), 1996 (winners), 1998, 2000 (winners), 2003 (tie), 2005 (winners), 2007 (winners), 2009 (winners), 2011 (winners), 2013 (winners), 2015 (winners), 2017 (winners)
- Ryder Cup: 1995, 1997, 1999 (winners), 2002, 2004, 2006, 2008 (winners), 2010, 2012, 2014, 2016 (winners), 2018
- Alfred Dunhill Cup: 1996 (winners)
- Wendy's 3-Tour Challenge (representing PGA Tour): 1997 (winners), 2000 (winners)
- World Cup: 2002

President Cup points record
1994	1996	1998	2000	2003	2005	2007	2009	2011	2013	2015	2017	Total
3	1.5	1	3	0	4	3	4.5	3	2.5	3.5	3.5	32.5

Ryder Cup points record
1995	1997	1999	2002	2004	2006	2008	2010	2012	2014	2016	2018	Total
3	2	2	2.5	1	0.5	2	1	3	2	2.5	0	21.5

== See also ==
- List of golfers with most European Tour wins
- List of golfers with most PGA Tour wins
- List of men's major championships winning golfers
- Monday Night Golf
