= 2009 WGC-HSBC Champions =

Coordinates: 31.110105°N 121.216407°E

Tournament information
- Dates: 5–8 November 2009
- Location: Shanghai, China
- Course: Sheshan Golf Club
- Tour: European Tour

Statistics
- Par: 72
- Length: 7,199
- Field: 78 players
- Cut: None
- Prize fund: $7,000,000
- Winner's share: $1,200,000

Champion
- (United States) Phil Mickelson
- 271 (−17)

The 2009 WGC-HSBC Champions was a golf tournament that was contested from 5–8 November 2009 at the Sheshan Golf Club in Shanghai, China. It was the first WGC-HSBC Champions tournament, and the fourth of four World Golf Championships events held in 2009.

Phil Mickelson won the tournament, and claimed his second World Golf Championships title of the year and for his career. He won over Ernie Els by one stroke, and Mickelson shot a 17-under-par 271.

== Field ==
The following is a list of players for the 2009 WGC-HSBC Champions tournament. Winners of events are those between the 2008 HSBC Champions and the 2009 WGC-HSBC Champions. The 2008 HSBC-Champions was considered to be an Asian Tour event. However, in determining which were the top rated events, the strength of field for the previous year's event was used (i.e. the event between the 2007 and 2008 HSBC-Champions). Only those events with a strength of field of 40 or more were considered.

1. Winners of the four major championships and The Players Championship

Stewart Cink, Henrik Stenson, Yang Yong-eun (3)

- Qualified but did not play: Ángel Cabrera, Lucas Glover

2. Winners of the three World Golf Championships

Phil Mickelson (3), Geoff Ogilvy (3,10), Tiger Woods (3)

3. Winners of the 23 top rated PGA Tour events

Paul Casey (5), Brian Gay, Retief Goosen, Jerry Kelly, Sean O'Hair, Rory Sabbatini, Nick Watney

- Qualified but did not play: Dustin Johnson, Zach Johnson, Kenny Perry, Heath Slocum, Steve Stricker

4. Top 5 available players from the FedEx Cup points list

Jason Dufner, Ernie Els, Pádraig Harrington, Steve Marino, Ian Poulter

- Qualified but did not play: Luke Donald, Jim Furyk, Marc Leishman, Hunter Mahan, Kevin Na, John Senden, David Toms, Scott Verplank, Mike Weir

5. Winners of the 23 top rated European Tour events

Christian Cévaër, Nick Dougherty, Simon Dyson, Ross Fisher, Ricardo González, Peter Hedblom, Jeppe Huldahl, Michael Jonzon, Martin Kaymer, James Kingston, Søren Kjeldsen, Thomas Levet, Shane Lowry, Rory McIlroy, Alex Norén, Álvaro Quirós, Scott Strange (10), Daniel Vancsik, Lee Westwood

6. Top 5 available players from the Race to Dubai

Gonzalo Fernández-Castaño, Sergio García (7), Peter Hanson, Francesco Molinari, Oliver Wilson

7. Nine players - winners of the top rated Asian Tour events, remainder from Order of Merit

Gaganjeet Bhullar (OoM), Chapchai Nirat (OoM), Anthony Kang, Lin Wen-tang, Lam Chih Bing, Daisuke Maruyama (OoM, 8), Chinnaswamy Muniyappa (OoM), Jyoti Randhawa (OoM), Thongchai Jaidee

8. Five players - winners of the top rated Japan Golf Tour events, remainder from Order of Merit

Yuta Ikeda (OoM), Ryo Ishikawa, Shingo Katayama, Prayad Marksaeng, Jeev Milkha Singh

9. Five players - winners of the top rated Sunshine Tour events, remainder from Order of Merit

Thomas Aiken (OoM), Jean Hugo (OoM), Garth Mulroy (OoM), Mark Murless (OoM), Richard Sterne

10. Five players - winners of the top rated PGA Tour of Australasia events, remainder from Order of Merit

Robert Allenby (OoM), Mark Brown (OoM), Greg Chalmers (OoM), Danny Lee, Rod Pampling

- Qualified but did not play: Tim Clark

11. Four players from China

Liang Wenchong, Wu Ashun, Wu Weihuang, Zhang Lianwei

12. Top two available players, not otherwise exempt, from the Official World Golf Ranking as of October 26, 2009

Anthony Kim, Camilo Villegas

- Qualified but did not play: Vijay Singh

13. If needed to fill the field of 78 players, winners of additional tournaments, ordered by strength of field

Players in bold were added to the field through this category. Players listed in "()" already qualified in a previous category. Players listed with their ~~name stricken~~ did not play.

1. 2009 Bob Hope Classic: **Pat Perez**
2. 2009 Buick Open: (Tiger Woods)
3. 2009 Justin Timberlake Shriners Hospitals for Children Open: **Martin Laird**
4. 2008 Children's Miracle Network Classic: ~~Davis Love III~~
5. 2009 John Deere Classic: (Steve Stricker)
6. 2009 Wyndham Championship: **Ryan Moore**
7. 2009 RBC Canadian Open: **Nathan Green**
8. 2009 Frys.com Open: ~~Troy Matteson~~
9. 2009 Valero Texas Open: ~~(Zach Johnson)~~
10. 2009 Turning Stone Resort Championship: **Matt Kuchar**
11. 2008 Casio World Open: **Koumei Oda**

== Round summaries ==
=== First round ===
Place	Player	Score	To par
1	(United States) Nick Watney	64	−8
T2	(Germany) Martin Kaymer	66	−6
T2	(Republic of Ireland) Shane Lowry	66	−6
T2	(United States) Ryan Moore	66	−6
T6	(England) Paul Casey	67	−5
T6	(United States) Anthony Kim	67	−5
T6	(Taiwan) Lin Wen-tang	67	−5
T6	(United States) Tiger Woods	67	−5
T9	(England) Nick Dougherty	68	−4
T9	(United States) Matt Kuchar	68	−4
T9	(United States) Pat Perez	68	−4
T9	(India) Jyoti Randhawa	68	−4

=== Second round ===
Place	Player	Score	To par
T1	(United States) Nick Watney	64-70=134	−10
T1	(United States) Tiger Woods	67-67=134	−10
T3	(United States) Phil Mickelson	69-66=135	−9
T3	(United States) Ryan Moore	66-69=135	−9
T3	(Spain) Álvaro Quirós	69-66=135	−9
6	(United States) Anthony Kim	67-69=136	−8
7	(United States) Pat Perez	68-69=137	−7
T8	(United States) Brian Gay	69-69=138	−6
T8	(India) Jyoti Randhawa	68-70=138	−6
T10	(Japan) Ryo Ishikawa	72-67=139	−5
T10	(Japan) Koumei Oda	70-69=139	−5
T10	(Colombia) Camilo Villegas	70-69=139	−5
T10	(Taiwan) Lin Wen-tang	67-72=139	−5

=== Third round ===
Place	Player	Score	To par
1	(United States) Phil Mickelson	69-66-67=202	−14
T2	(United States) Nick Watney	64-70-70=204	−12
T2	(United States) Tiger Woods	67-67-70=204	−12
4	(United States) Ryan Moore	66-69-70=205	−11
5	(England) Lee Westwood	70-71-65=206	−10
T6	(United States) Anthony Kim	67-69-72=208	−8
T6	(India) Jyoti Randhawa	68-70-70=208	−8
T8	(South Africa) Ernie Els	70-71-68=209	−7
T8	(Japan) Ryo Ishikawa	72-67-70=209	−7
T8	(Germany) Martin Kaymer	66-74-69=209	−7
T8	(Taiwan) Lin Wen-tang	67-72-70=209	−7

=== Final round ===
Place	Player	Score	To par	Money ($)
1	(United States) Phil Mickelson	69-66-67-69=271	−17	1,200,000
2	(South Africa) Ernie Els	70-71-68-63=272	−16	675,000
3	(United States) Ryan Moore	66-69-70-68=273	−15	430,000
4	(Northern Ireland) Rory McIlroy	73-68-70-63=274	−14	315,000
5	(United States) Nick Watney	64-70-70-71=275	−13	250,000
T6	(Germany) Martin Kaymer	66-74-69-67=276	−12	190,000
T6	(United States) Tiger Woods	67-67-70-72=276	−12	190,000
T8	(Spain) Álvaro Quirós	69-66-76-66=277	−11	147,500
T8	(England) Lee Westwood	70-71-65-71=277	−11	147,500
T10	(South Africa) Retief Goosen	71-71-68-68=278	−10	99,571
T10	(United States) Anthony Kim	67-69-72-70=278	−10	99,571
T10	(Denmark) Søren Kjeldsen	69-72-71-66=278	−10	99,571
T10	(Japan) Daisuke Maruyama	72-69-74-63=278	−10	99,571
T10	(Italy) Francesco Molinari	73-67-70-68=278	−10	99,571
T10	(Australia) Geoff Ogilvy	72-74-65-67=278	−10	99,571
T10	(United States) Pat Perez	68-69-75-66=278	−10	99,571
