= 2009 WGC-CA Championship =

Coordinates: 25°49′10″N 80°20′34″W

Tournament information
- Dates: March 12–15, 2009
- Location: Doral, Florida, U.S.
- Course(s): Doral Golf Resort & Spa
- Tour(s): PGA Tour; European Tour

Statistics
- Par: 72
- Length: 7,266
- Field: 80 players
- Cut: None
- Prize fund: $8,500,000
- Winner's share: $1,400,000

Champion
- (United States) Phil Mickelson
- 269 (−19)

The 2009 WGC-CA Championship was a golf tournament that was contested from March 12–15 at Doral Golf Resort & Spa in Doral, Florida. It was the tenth WGC-CA Championship tournament, and the second of four World Golf Championships events staged in 2009.

Phil Mickelson won the tournament to capture his first World Golf Championships title.

== Field ==
1. Top 50 players from the Official World Golf Rankings two weeks prior to event
Robert Allenby (2,3), Stephen Ames (2), Stuart Appleby (3), Aaron Baddeley (2), Paul Casey (2,7), K. J. Choi (2,3), Stewart Cink (2,3), Tim Clark (2,3), Ben Curtis (2,3), Luke Donald (2), Ernie Els (2,3), Ross Fisher (2,6,7), Jim Furyk (2,3), Sergio García (2,3,6,7), Retief Goosen (2,6), Pádraig Harrington (2,6), Trevor Immelman (2,3), Miguel Ángel Jiménez (2,6), Dustin Johnson (2,4,5), Zach Johnson (2,4,5), Robert Karlsson (2,6), Shingo Katayama (2,9), Martin Kaymer (2,6), Anthony Kim (2,3), Justin Leonard (2,3), Hunter Mahan (2,3), Graeme McDowell (2,6), Rory McIlroy (2,7), Phil Mickelson (2,3,4,5), Geoff Ogilvy (2,4,5,7,10), Sean O'Hair (2), Louis Oosthuizen (2,7), Kenny Perry (2,3,4,5), Ian Poulter (2,6), Álvaro Quirós (2,7), Andrés Romero (2,3), Justin Rose (2), Rory Sabbatini (2), Adam Scott (2), Jeev Milkha Singh (2,6,8), Vijay Singh (2,3), Henrik Stenson (2,6,7), Richard Sterne (2,7,11), Steve Stricker (2,3,4,5), Camilo Villegas (2,3), Boo Weekley, Mike Weir (2,3,4), Lee Westwood (2,6), Oliver Wilson (2,6,7), Tiger Woods (2)

2. Top 50 players from the Official World Golf Rankings one week prior to event
Peter Hanson (6), Davis Love III

3. Top 30 from the final 2008 PGA Tour FedEx Cup points list
Briny Baird, Chad Campbell, Ken Duke, Dudley Hart, Ryuji Imada, Billy Mayfair, Carl Pettersson, Kevin Sutherland, D. J. Trahan, Bubba Watson

4. Top 10 from the PGA Tour FedEx Cup points list two weeks prior to event
Charley Hoffman, Pat Perez (5), Nick Watney (5)

5. Top 10 from the PGA Tour FedEx Cup points list one week prior to event
John Rollins, Yang Yong-eun

6. Top 20 from the final 2008 European Tour Order of Merit
Darren Clarke, Richard Finch, Søren Hansen, James Kingston, Søren Kjeldsen, Pablo Larrazábal

7. Top 10 from the European Tour Race to Dubai two weeks prior to event

8. Top 3 from the final 2008 Asian Tour Order of Merit
Mark Brown (10), Lin Wen-tang

9. Top 3 from the final 2008 Japan Golf Tour Order of Merit
Prayad Marksaeng, Azuma Yano

10. Top 3 from the final 2008 PGA Tour of Australasia Order of Merit
Rod Pampling

11. Top 3 from the final 2008 Sunshine Tour Order of Merit
Thomas Aiken, Garth Mulroy

== Round summaries ==
=== First round ===
Place	Player	Score	To par
T1	(South Africa) Retief Goosen	65	−7
T1	(Thailand) Prayad Marksaeng	65	−7
T1	(United States) Phil Mickelson	65	−7
T1	(India) Jeev Milkha Singh	65	−7
T5	(Republic of Ireland) Pádraig Harrington	66	−6
T5	(South Africa) James Kingston	66	−6
T5	(Australia) Rod Pampling	66	−6
T5	(United States) Nick Watney	66	−6
T9	(United States) Sean O'Hair	67	−5
T9	(South Africa) Louis Oosthuizen	67	−5
T9	(Argentina) Andrés Romero	67	−5
T9	(Colombia) Camilo Villegas	67	−5
T9	(England) Oliver Wilson	67	−5

=== Second round ===
Place	Player	Score	To par
1	(United States) Phil Mickelson	65-66=131	−13
2	(United States) Nick Watney	66-67=133	−11
T3	(Northern Ireland) Rory McIlroy	68-66=134	−10
T3	(United States) Kenny Perry	70-64=134	−10
T5	(Thailand) Prayad Marksaeng	65-70=135	−9
T5	(Australia) Rod Pampling	66-69=135	−9
T5	(Colombia) Camilo Villegas	67-68=135	−9
T8	(United States) Jim Furyk	68-68=136	−8
T8	(United States) Dustin Johnson	70-66=136	−8
T8	(Denmark) Søren Kjeldsen	70-66=136	−8
T8	(South Africa) Louis Oosthuizen	67-69=136	−8
T8	(England) Ian Poulter	69-67=136	−8
T8	(Spain) Álvaro Quirós	72-64=136	−8
T8	(India) Jeev Milkha Singh	65-71=136	−8

=== Third round ===
Place	Player	Score	To par
T1	(United States) Phil Mickelson	65-66-69=200	−16
T1	(United States) Nick Watney	66-67-67=200	−16
T3	(India) Jeev Milkha Singh	65-71-68=204	−12
T3	(Colombia) Camilo Villegas	67-68-69=204	−12
T5	(United States) Jim Furyk	68-68-69=205	−11
T5	(United States) Charley Hoffman	68-70-67=205	−11
T5	(Denmark) Søren Kjeldsen	70-66-69=205	−11
T5	(United States) Kenny Perry	70-64-71=205	−11
T5	(Spain) Álvaro Quirós	72-64-69=205	−11
T10	(United States) Justin Leonard	69-69-68=206	−10
T10	(Northern Ireland) Rory McIlroy	68-66-72=206	−10
T10	(Australia) Rod Pampling	66-69-71=206	−10

=== Final round ===
Place	Player	Score	To par	Winnings ($)
1	(United States) Phil Mickelson	65-66-69-69=269	−19	1,400,000
2	(United States) Nick Watney	66-67-67-70=270	−18	820,000
3	(United States) Jim Furyk	68-68-69-67=272	−16	470,000
4	(India) Jeev Milkha Singh	65-71-68-70=274	−14	360,000
T5	(Colombia) Camilo Villegas	67-68-69-71=275	−13	275,000
T5	(England) Oliver Wilson	67-70-72-66=275	−13	275,000
T7	(South Africa) Thomas Aiken	74-66-71-65=276	−12	192,500
T7	(Denmark) Søren Kjeldsen	70-66-69-71=276	−12	192,500
T9	(United States) Justin Leonard	69-69-68-71=277	−11	142,500
T9	(Australia) Rod Pampling	66-69-71-71=277	−11	142,500
T9	(United States) Kenny Perry	70-64-71-72=277	−11	142,500
T9	(United States) Tiger Woods	71-70-68-68=277	−11	142,500

==== Scorecard ====
Final round

Hole	1	2	3	4	5	6	7	8	9	10	11	12	13	14	15	16	17	18
Par	5	4	4	3	4	4	4	5	3	5	4	5	3	4	3	4	4	4
(United States) Mickelson	−17	−18	−18	−17	−18	−18	−18	−19	−19	−20	−20	−19	−19	−19	−19	−19	−19	−19
(United States) Watney	−17	−17	−18	−18	−18	−18	−17	−17	−18	−20	−19	−18	−18	−18	−18	−18	−18	−18
(United States) Furyk	−12	−12	−12	−10	−10	−10	−11	−11	−11	−12	−12	−13	−13	−14	−15	−15	−16	−16
(India) Singh	−13	−13	−13	−12	−13	−13	−14	−13	−13	−13	−13	−14	−13	−13	−13	−14	−14	−14
(Colombia) Villegas	−13	−13	−13	−12	−12	−12	−12	−12	−12	−13	−13	−13	−13	−13	−13	−14	−13	−13
(England) Wilson	−8	−9	−9	−9	−9	−9	−10	−10	−10	−11	−11	−12	−12	−12	−12	−13	−13	−13

Cumulative tournament scores, relative to par

Eagle	Birdie	Bogey	Double bogey
