= 2006 Masters Tournament =

American golf tournament held in 2006

- Front cover of the 2006 Masters Journal

Tournament information
- Dates: April 6–9, 2006
- Location: Augusta, Georgia; 33.503°N 82.020°W
- Course: Augusta National Golf Club
- Organized by: Augusta National Golf Club
- Tours: PGA Tour; European Tour; Japan Golf Tour

Statistics
- Par: 72
- Length: 7,445 yards (6,808 m)
- Field: 90 players, 47 after cut
- Cut: 148 (+4)
- Prize fund: US$7,000,000
- Winner's share: $1,260,000

Champion
- (United States) Phil Mickelson
- 281 (−7)
- Location in the United States Location in Georgia

The 2006 Masters Tournament was the 70th Masters Tournament, played April 6–9 at Augusta National Golf Club in Augusta, Georgia. Prior to the tournament, the course was lengthened by 155 yards (142 m) to 7,445 yards (6,808 m), up from 7,290 yards (6,666 m) in 2005. Phil Mickelson won the second of his three Masters and second consecutive major with a 281 (−7), two strokes ahead of runner-up Tim Clark. The purse was $7 million and the winner's share was $1.26 million.

This was the final Masters appearance for three-time champion Nick Faldo.

== Course ==
Hole	Name	Yards	Par	Hole	Name	Yards	Par
1	Tea Olive	455	4	10	Camellia	495	4
2	Pink Dogwood	575	5	11	White Dogwood	505	4
3	Flowering Peach	350	4	12	Golden Bell	155	3
4	Flowering Crab Apple	240	3	13	Azalea	510	5
5	Magnolia	455	4	14	Chinese Fir	440	4
6	Juniper	180	3	15	Firethorn	530	5
7	Pampas	450	4	16	Redbud	170	3
8	Yellow Jasmine	570	5	17	Nandina	440	4
9	Carolina Cherry	460	4	18	Holly	465	4
Out		3,735	36	In		3,710	36
Source:				Total		7,445	72

== Field ==
1. Masters champions
Charles Coody, Fred Couples (12,14,16,17), Ben Crenshaw, Nick Faldo, Raymond Floyd, Bernhard Langer, Sandy Lyle, Phil Mickelson (4,10,13,14,16,17), Larry Mize, José María Olazábal (12,16,17), Mark O'Meara, Gary Player, Vijay Singh (4,10,11,14,15,16,17), Craig Stadler, Tom Watson, Mike Weir (10,16,17), Tiger Woods (2,3,10,11,12,13,14,15,16,17), Ian Woosnam, Fuzzy Zoeller

- Tommy Aaron, Seve Ballesteros, Gay Brewer, Jack Burke Jr., Billy Casper, Doug Ford, Bob Goalby, Byron Nelson, Jack Nicklaus, and Arnold Palmer did not play.

2. U.S. Open champions (last five years)
Michael Campbell (11,16,17), Jim Furyk (14,16,17), Retief Goosen (10,14,16,17)

3. The Open champions (last five years)
Ben Curtis, David Duval, Ernie Els (16,17), Todd Hamilton

4. PGA champions (last five years)
Rich Beem, Shaun Micheel, David Toms (14,15,16,17)

5. The Players Championship winners (last three years)
Stephen Ames (15,17), Fred Funk (14,16,17), Adam Scott (14,16,17)

6. U.S. Amateur champion and runner-up
Dillon Dougherty (a), Edoardo Molinari (a)

7. The Amateur champion
Brian McElhinney (a)

8. U.S. Amateur Public Links champion
Clay Ogden (a)

9. U.S. Mid-Amateur champion
Kevin Marsh (a)

10. Top 16 players and ties from the 2005 Masters
Chris DiMarco (14,16,17), Luke Donald (14,15,16,17), Mark Hensby (11,16), Tim Herron (14,16), David Howell (16,17), Trevor Immelman, Tom Lehman (16,17), Justin Leonard (14,16,17), Thomas Levet, Rod Pampling (16,17)

- Ryan Moore did not play, as he was recovering from wrist surgery.

11. Top eight players and ties from the 2005 U.S. Open
Tim Clark (14,16,17), Sergio García (14,16,17), Davis Love III (13,14,16,17), Rocco Mediate

12. Top four players and ties from the 2005 Open Championship
Colin Montgomerie (16,17)

13. Top four players and ties from 2005 PGA Championship
Thomas Bjørn (16,17)

- Steve Elkington did not play due to a groin injury.

14. Top 40 players from the 2005 PGA Tour money list
Stuart Appleby (15,16,17), Jason Bohn, Olin Browne, Bart Bryant (16,17), Mark Calcavecchia, Chad Campbell (15,16,17), K. J. Choi (16,17), Ben Crane (16,17), Lucas Glover, Pádraig Harrington (16,17), Charles Howell III, Brandt Jobe (16,17), Zach Johnson (17), Peter Lonard (16), Shigeki Maruyama (16), Billy Mayfair, Joe Ogilvie, Geoff Ogilvy (15,16,17), Sean O'Hair (16,17), Carl Pettersson (17), Ted Purdy, Vaughn Taylor, Scott Verplank (16,17)

- Kenny Perry (16,17) did not play, as he was recovering from knee surgery.

15. Top 10 players from the 2006 PGA Tour money list on March 27
Arron Oberholser (17), Rory Sabbatini (17)

16. Top 50 players from the final 2005 world ranking
Robert Allenby (17), Ángel Cabrera (17), Stewart Cink (17), Darren Clarke (17), John Daly, Miguel Ángel Jiménez (17), Shingo Katayama (17), Paul McGinley (17), Nick O'Hern (17), Henrik Stenson (17), Lee Westwood (17)

17. Top 50 players from world ranking published March 27

- All such players were eligible under higher categories.

18. Special foreign invitation
Thongchai Jaidee

== Round summaries ==
=== First round ===
Thursday, April 6, 2006

Eighteen players broke par on the lengthened Augusta National. Vijay Singh, the 2000 champion, shot a five-under 67 to take the first round lead by one stroke over Rocco Mediate. Arron Oberholser was next with a 69 for solo third place. Four others were at 70, including 2004 champion Phil Mickelson and two-time U.S. Open champion Retief Goosen. Defending champion Tiger Woods shot an even-par 72, despite a pair of three-putt bogeys and a double bogey on the par-5 15th hole.

Place	Player	Score	To par
1	(Fiji) Vijay Singh	67	−5
2	(United States) Rocco Mediate	68	−4
3	(United States) Arron Oberholser	69	−3
T4	(South Africa) Tim Clark	70	−2
T4	(South Africa) Retief Goosen	70	−2
T4	(United States) Phil Mickelson	70	−2
T4	(Australia) Geoff Ogilvy	70	−2
T8	(Australia) Stuart Appleby	71	−1
T8	(United States) Rich Beem	71	−1
T8	(United States) Chad Campbell	71	−1
T8	(United States) Fred Couples	71	−1
T8	(United States) Ben Crenshaw	71	−1
T8	(United States) Ben Curtis	71	−1
T8	(South Africa) Ernie Els	71	−1
T8	(England) David Howell	71	−1
T8	(United States) Billy Mayfair	71	−1
T8	(Australia) Nick O'Hern	71	−1
T8	(Canada) Mike Weir	71	−1

=== Second round ===
Friday, April 7, 2006

Chad Campbell, with just one top ten result at a major (runner-up at 2003 PGA Championship), led at the halfway point by three strokes at 138 (−6). His 67 (−5) on Friday was one of only three scores in the 60s. In a tie for second at 141 (−3) was Singh, Mediate, and 1992 champion Fred Couples. Mickelson shot even par for the round and was among a group tied for fifth at 142 (−2). The cut came at 148 (+4); among the notables to miss the cut was Chris DiMarco, the playoff runner-up to Woods in 2005. This was 1971 champ Charles Coody's final entry as a competitor; after struggling in his opening round to an 89, he played very well (at age 68) in round 2, carding a 2-over par 74 for his last competitive round at Augusta.

Place	Player	Score	To par
1	(United States) Chad Campbell	71-67=138	−6
T2	(United States) Fred Couples	71-70=141	−3
T2	(United States) Rocco Mediate	68-73=141	−3
T2	(Fiji) Vijay Singh	67-74=141	−3
T5	(South Africa) Tim Clark	70-72=142	−2
T5	(Northern Ireland) Darren Clarke	72-70=142	−2
T5	(South Africa) Ernie Els	71-71=142	−2
T5	(England) David Howell	71-71=142	−2
T5	(United States) Phil Mickelson	70-72=142	−2
T10	(United States) Olin Browne	74-69=143	−1
T10	(United States) Ben Crenshaw	71-72=143	−1
T10	(South Africa) Retief Goosen	70-73=143	−1
T10	(Republic of Ireland) Pádraig Harrington	73-70=143	−1
T10	(United States) Billy Mayfair	71-72=143	−1
T10	(Australia) Nick O'Hern	71-72=143	−1
T10	(United States) Tiger Woods	72-71=143	−1

Amateurs: McElhinney (+11), Molinari (+13), Ogden (+15), Dougherty (+16), Marsh (+16).

=== Third round ===
Saturday, April 8, 2006
Sunday, April 9, 2006

Thunderstorms postponed a good chunk of action in the third round, forcing it to be completed on Sunday morning. Mickelson moved to the top of the leaderboard with a two-under 70 to 212 (−4). Second round leader Campbell shot 75 (+3) to fall into a tie for second with Couples, who shot even par for the round. Woods shot 71 for 214, two strokes back in a six-way tie for fourth, along with Singh and four others.

Place	Player	Score	To par
1	(United States) Phil Mickelson	70-72-70=212	−4
T2	(United States) Chad Campbell	71-67-75=213	−3
T2	(United States) Fred Couples	71-70-72=213	−3
T4	(Canada) Stephen Ames	74-70-70=214	−2
T4	(South Africa) Tim Clark	70-72-72=214	−2
T4	(Northern Ireland) Darren Clarke	72-70-72=214	−2
T4	(United States) Rocco Mediate	68-73-73=214	−2
T4	(Fiji) Vijay Singh	67-74-73=214	−2
T4	(United States) Tiger Woods	72-71-71=214	−2
T10	(South Africa) Retief Goosen	70-73-72=215	−1
T10	(Spain) Miguel Ángel Jiménez	72-74-69=215	−1

=== Final round ===
Sunday, April 9, 2006

==== Summary ====
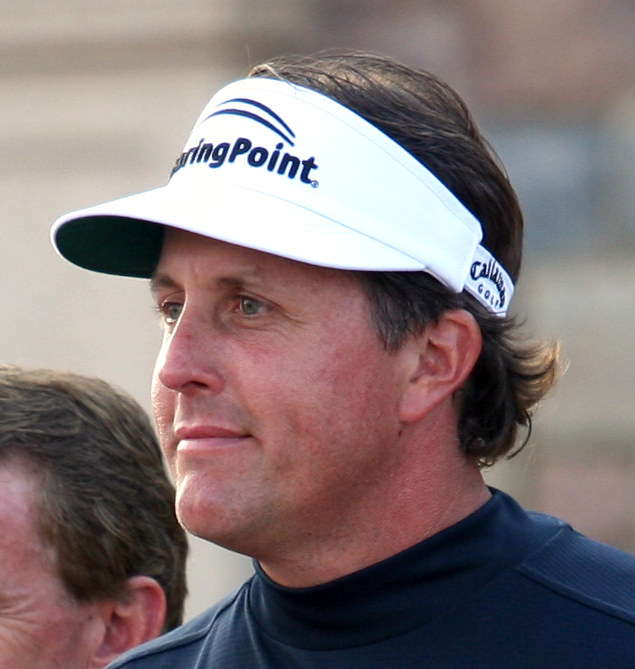
Phil Mickelson won his second Masters title

External videos
- Full final round coverage on CBS on YouTube

Mickelson won his second consecutive major (2005 PGA Championship) and his second green jacket with a final round 69 for a two-stroke victory over Tim Clark. Mickelson's lone bogey was at the final hole, when he had victory all but assured. The win also gave him his third major in the last nine. Clark finished in solo second by holing-out from a green side bunker at the 72nd hole. Woods shot a two-under 70 to finish three strokes behind Mickelson in a five-way tie for third. Others finishing in third place were Couples, Goosen, Campbell, and José María Olazábal, the 1994 and 1999 champion, who shot the round of the tournament, a six-under 66. Sadly, Mediate fell out of contention after hitting three balls into the water and making a ten at the par-3 12th.

==== Final leaderboard ====
Champion
(a) = amateur
(c) = past champion

Top 10
Place	Player	Score	To par	Money (US$)
1	(United States) Phil Mickelson (c)	70-72-70-69=281	−7	1,260,000
2	(South Africa) Tim Clark	70-72-72-69=283	−5	756,000
T3	(United States) Chad Campbell	71-67-75-71=284	−4	315,700
T3	(United States) Fred Couples (c)	71-70-72-71=284	−4	315,700
T3	(South Africa) Retief Goosen	70-73-72-69=284	−4	315,700
T3	(Spain) José María Olazábal (c)	76-71-71-66=284	−4	315,700
T3	(United States) Tiger Woods (c)	72-71-71-70=284	−4	315,700
T8	(Argentina) Ángel Cabrera	73-74-70-68=285	−3	210,000
T8	(Fiji) Vijay Singh (c)	67-74-73-71=285	−3	210,000
10	(United States) Stewart Cink	72-73-71-70=286	−2	189,000

Leaderboard below the top 10
Place	Player	Score	To par	Money ($)
T11	(Canada) Stephen Ames	74-70-70-73=287	−1	161,000
T11	(Spain) Miguel Ángel Jiménez	72-74-69-72=287	−1	161,000
T11	(Canada) Mike Weir (c)	71-73-73-70=287	−1	161,000
T14	(United States) Billy Mayfair	71-72-73-72=288	E	129,500
T14	(United States) Arron Oberholser	69-75-73-71=288	E	129,500
T16	(Australia) Geoff Ogilvy	70-75-73-71=289	+1	112,000
T16	(Australia) Rod Pampling	72-73-72-72=289	+1	112,000
T16	(United States) Scott Verplank	74-70-74-71=289	+1	112,000
T19	(Australia) Stuart Appleby	71-75-73-71=290	+2	91,000
T19	(England) David Howell	71-71-76-72=290	+2	91,000
T19	(Australia) Nick O'Hern	71-72-76-71=290	+2	91,000
T22	(Australia) Robert Allenby	73-73-74-71=291	+3	67,200
T22	(Northern Ireland) Darren Clarke	72-70-72-77=291	+3	67,200
T22	(United States) Jim Furyk	73-75-68-75=291	+3	67,200
T22	(Australia) Mark Hensby	80-67-70-74=291	+3	67,200
T22	(United States) Davis Love III	74-71-74-72=291	+3	67,200
T27	(South Africa) Ernie Els	71-71-74-76=292	+4	49,700
T27	(Republic of Ireland) Pádraig Harrington	73-70-75-74=292	+4	49,700
T27	(Japan) Shingo Katayama	75-70-73-74=292	+4	49,700
T27	(Sweden) Carl Pettersson	72-74-73-73=292	+4	49,700
T27	(Australia) Adam Scott	72-74-75-71=292	+4	49,700
T32	(Denmark) Thomas Bjørn	73-75-76-69=293	+5	40,512
T32	(United States) Brandt Jobe	72-76-77-68=293	+5	40,512
T32	(United States) Zach Johnson	74-72-77-70=293	+5	40,512
T32	(United States) Ted Purdy	72-76-74-71=293	+5	40,512
T36	(United States) Tim Herron	76-71-71-76=294	+6	34,416
T36	(United States) Rocco Mediate	68-73-73-80=294	+6	34,416
T36	(South Africa) Rory Sabbatini	76-70-74-74=294	+6	34,416
T39	(United States) Jason Bohn	73-71-77-74=295	+7	30,100
T39	(United States) Ben Curtis	71-74-77-73=295	+7	30,100
T39	(United States) Justin Leonard	75-70-79-71=295	+7	30,100
T42	(United States) Rich Beem	71-73-73-79=296	+8	25,900
T42	(England) Luke Donald	74-72-76-74=296	+8	25,900
T42	(United States) Larry Mize (c)	75-72-77-72=296	+8	25,900
45	(United States) Olin Browne	74-69-80-74=297	+9	23,100
46	(Spain) Sergio García	72-74-79-73=298	+10	21,700
47	(United States) Ben Crenshaw (c)	71-72-78-79=300	+12	20,300
CUT	(United States) Bart Bryant	76-73=149	+5	
CUT	(New Zealand) Michael Campbell	75-74=149	+5	
CUT	(United States) Ben Crane	74-75=149	+5	
CUT	(France) Thomas Levet	78-71=149	+5	
CUT	(Scotland) Colin Montgomerie	74-75=149	+5	
CUT	(United States) Vaughn Taylor	75-74=149	+5	
CUT	(Wales) Ian Woosnam (c)	77-72=149	+5	
CUT	(United States) Chris DiMarco	76-74=150	+6	
CUT	(United States) Todd Hamilton	74-76=150	+6	
CUT	(Australia) Peter Lonard	76-74=150	+6	
CUT	(United States) David Toms	72-78=150	+6	
CUT	(England) Lee Westwood	75-75=150	+6	
CUT	(United States) Lucas Glover	73-78=151	+7	
CUT	(South Africa) Trevor Immelman	75-76=151	+7	
CUT	(United States) Tom Lehman	76-75=151	+7	
CUT	(United States) Joe Ogilvie	74-77=151	+7	
CUT	(Sweden) Henrik Stenson	77-74=151	+7	
CUT	(South Korea) K. J. Choi	76-76=152	+8	
CUT	(United States) Raymond Floyd (c)	79-73=152	+8	
CUT	(United States) Shaun Micheel	82-70=152	+8	
CUT	(United States) Sean O'Hair	76-76=152	+8	
CUT	(United States) John Daly	74-79=153	+9	
CUT	(England) Nick Faldo (c)	79-74=153	+9	
CUT	(Thailand) Thongchai Jaidee	78-75=153	+9	
CUT	(Germany) Bernhard Langer (c)	79-74=153	+9	
CUT	(Japan) Shigeki Maruyama	79-75=154	+10	
CUT	(United States) Mark O'Meara (c)	82-72=154	+10	
CUT	(United States) Tom Watson (c)	79-75=154	+10	
CUT	(Republic of Ireland) Brian McElhinney (a)	80-75=155	+11	
CUT	(Republic of Ireland) Paul McGinley	78-77=155	+11	
CUT	(United States) Craig Stadler (c)	77-78=155	+11	
CUT	(United States) Mark Calcavecchia	80-76=156	+12	
CUT	(United States) Fred Funk	76-81=157	+13	
CUT	(Italy) Edoardo Molinari (a)	80-77=157	+13	
CUT	(United States) David Duval	84-75=159	+15	
CUT	(United States) Clay Ogden (a)	83-76=159	+15	
CUT	(United States) Fuzzy Zoeller (c)	78-81=159	+15	
CUT	(United States) Dillon Dougherty (a)	82-78=160	+16	
CUT	(United States) Kevin Marsh (a)	79-81=160	+16	
CUT	(South Africa) Gary Player (c)	79-81=160	+16	
CUT	(Scotland) Sandy Lyle (c)	80-81=161	+17	
CUT	(United States) Charles Coody (c)	89-74=163	+19	
CUT	(United States) Charles Howell III	80-84=164	+20	

==== Scorecard ====
Hole	1	2	3	4	5	6	7	8	9	10	11	12	13	14	15	16	17	18
Par	4	5	4	3	4	3	4	5	4	4	4	3	5	4	5	3	4	4
(United States) Mickelson	−4	−4	−4	−4	−4	−4	−5	−6	−6	−6	−6	−6	−7	−7	−8	−8	−8	−7
(South Africa) Clark	−2	−1	−1	−1	−2	−2	−2	−3	−4	−4	−4	−3	−3	−4	−4	−4	−4	−5
(United States) Campbell	−2	−3	−3	−3	−3	−3	−4	−4	−4	−4	−3	−3	−3	−4	−3	−2	−3	−4
(United States) Couples	−4	−4	−4	−4	−4	−4	−5	−5	−5	−5	−4	−4	−5	−4	−4	−4	−4	−4
(South Africa) Goosen	−1	−2	−2	−2	−2	−1	−1	−2	−2	−2	−2	−1	−2	−2	−3	−4	−4	−4
(Spain) Olazábal	+2	+1	E	−1	−1	E	−1	−2	−2	−2	−1	−1	−2	−3	−5	−4	−4	−4
(United States) Woods	−2	−3	−3	−3	−3	−2	−2	−2	−2	−2	−1	−1	−2	−2	−3	−4	−3	−4
(Canada) Ames	−2	−2	−2	−1	−1	−1	E	E	E	E	E	E	E	E	−1	−1	−1	−1
(Spain) Jiménez	−2	−3	−3	−3	−4	−4	−4	−4	−4	−3	−3	−2	−3	−3	−3	−2	−1	−1
(Northern Ireland) Clarke	−3	−3	−3	−3	−2	−1	−1	−1	E	+1	+1	+1	+2	+2	+1	+1	+2	+3
(United States) Mediate	−1	−1	−1	−1	−1	−2	−3	−4	−4	−4	−3	+4	+4	+5	+5	+5	+5	+6

Cumulative tournament scores, relative to par

Eagle	Birdie	Bogey	Double bogey	Triple bogey+

== Par 3 Contest ==
Ben Crane won the annual Par 3 contest, which took place on Wednesday, April 5, with a four-under 23. Arnold Palmer and Jack Nicklaus, made a curtain call at the event; Nicklaus was one-under and was in contention throughout the day. Pádraig Harrington, Clark, and Oberholser all aced the 135-yard (123 m) ninth hole.
