= Pat Perez =

American professional golfer (born 1976)

Personal information
- Full name: Patrick Anthony Perez
- Nationality: United States
- Born: March 1, 1976 (age 50) Phoenix, Arizona, U.S.
- Height: 6 ft 0 in (1.83 m)
- Weight: 190 lb (86 kg; 14 st)
- Spouse: Ashley Perez (m. 2015; div. 2024)
- Children: 2

Career
- Sport: Golf
- College: Arizona State University
- Turned professional: 1997
- Former tours: PGA Tour; Buy.com Tour; LIV Golf
- Professional wins: 4
- Highest ranking: 16 (January 7, 2018) (as of October 25, 2026)

Number of wins by tour
- PGA Tour: 3
- Asian Tour: 1
- Korn Ferry Tour: 1

Best results in major championships
- Masters Tournament: T18: 2017
- PGA Championship: T6: 2005
- U.S. Open: T36: 2008, 2018
- The Open Championship: T17: 2018

Patrick Anthony Perez (born March 1, 1976) is an American professional golfer who competes on the PGA Tour Champions. After turning professional in 1997, he won three PGA Tour events, including the 2009 Bob Hope Classic, the 2016 OHL Classic at Mayakoba, and the 2017 CIMB Classic. Perez reached a career-high of 16th in the Official World Golf Ranking on January 7, 2018.

Perez competed in the LIV Golf League from 2022 to 2024 as a member of 4Aces GC. Following the 2024 season, he joined LIV Golf's broadcast team as an on-course reporter before returning to competitive golf on the PGA Tour Champions after becoming eligible in 2026.

== Career ==
Perez was born in Phoenix, Arizona, and is of Mexican-American descent.

Perez won his first PGA Tour event in 2009 at the Bob Hope Classic; he has finished second there twice. His career high in the Official World Golf Ranking was 16th in 2018.

On January 22, 2009, Perez finished the first 36 holes of the Bob Hope Classic with a 124 (−20), the lowest score, relative to par in PGA Tour history through two rounds. The start set or tied several records, including tying the record for low score (124) in consecutive rounds. Perez went on to win the tournament by three strokes over John Merrick, a win secured when Perez hit his second shot on the par 5, 18th hole, from 200 yards to 3 feet to win with a closing eagle for his first tour win.

Perez was a close friend of Major League Baseball player Pat Burrell and frequently spent time around the Philadelphia Phillies during their 2008 World Series championship season. In a 2010 interview, Perez said he felt like he was "part of the team" because of his close relationships with several players.

Perez spent much of the 2015–16 season out of golf after shoulder surgery. He earned his first win since 2009 at the 2016 OHL Classic at Mayakoba. He was also the first player since Harrison Frazar (2011 St. Jude Classic) to win a PGA Tour event while playing on a Medical Extension. Perez won the CIMB Classic in 2017.

In June 2022, Perez joined the LIV Golf Invitational Series after resigning his PGA Tour membership. For the 2023 LIV Golf League season, Perez signed with Dustin Johnson's 4Aces GC. He finished 28th in the individual standings and remained with the team for the 2024 season. Perez finished 48th in the 2024 individual standings. Following the season, his contract expired and he was replaced on the 4Aces roster by Thomas Pieters. In January 2025, Perez joined LIV Golf's broadcast team as an on-course reporter and analyst for the league's inaugural season with Fox Sports.

In 2026, after turning 50, Perez became eligible for the PGA Tour Champions. He made an immediate impact, tying for sixth at the Senior PGA Championship in his senior major debut and tying for eighth at the U.S. Senior Open.

== Broadcasting career ==
Following the 2024 LIV Golf League season, Perez joined LIV Golf's television broadcast team as an on-course reporter and analyst. His move coincided with the league's transition to Fox Sports as its U.S. broadcast partner for the 2025 season.

== Personal life ==
Perez married Ashley Perez in 2015. The couple divorced in 2024. They have two children.

== Professional wins (4) ==
=== PGA Tour wins (3) ===
No.	Date	Tournament	Winning score	Margin of victory	Runner-up
1	Jan 25, 2009	Bob Hope Classic	−33 (61-63-67-67-69=327)	3 strokes	(United States) John Merrick
2	Nov 13, 2016	OHL Classic at Mayakoba	−21 (68-66-62-67=263)	2 strokes	(United States) Gary Woodland
3	Oct 15, 2017	CIMB Classic^{1}	−24 (66-65-64-69=264)	4 strokes	(United States) Keegan Bradley

^{1}Co-sanctioned by the Asian Tour

=== Buy.com Tour wins (1) ===
No.	Date	Tournament	Winning score	Margin of victory	Runners-up
1	Aug 13, 2000	Buy.com Ozarks Open	−18 (66-69-66-69=270)	Playoff	(United States) Pat Bates, (United States) Mike Heinen

Buy.com Tour playoff record (1–0)

No.	Year	Tournament	Opponents	Result
1	2000	Buy.com Ozarks Open	(United States) Pat Bates, (United States) Mike Heinen	Won with birdie on first extra hole

== Results in major championships ==
Tournament	2002	2003	2004	2005	2006	2007	2008	2009
Masters Tournament		T45						CUT
U.S. Open	CUT		T40			CUT	T36	
The Open Championship				T67		T20	CUT	
PGA Championship	70			T6	CUT	T18	T58	CUT

Tournament	2010	2011	2012	2013	2014	2015	2016	2017	2018
Masters Tournament								T18	CUT
U.S. Open								CUT	T36
The Open Championship								CUT	T17
PGA Championship			T21		T46	CUT		T28	T35

Tournament	2019
Masters Tournament	
PGA Championship	T78
U.S. Open	
The Open Championship	

Top 10
Did not play

CUT = missed the half-way cut
"T" indicates a tie for a place

=== Summary ===
Tournament	Wins	2nd	3rd	Top-5	Top-10	Top-25	Events	Cuts made
Masters Tournament	0	0	0	0	0	1	4	2
PGA Championship	0	0	0	0	1	3	12	9
U.S. Open	0	0	0	0	0	0	6	3
The Open Championship	0	0	0	0	0	2	5	3
Totals	0	0	0	0	1	6	27	17

- Most consecutive cuts made – 5 (2002 PGA – 2005 PGA)
- Longest streak of top-10s – 1

== Results in The Players Championship ==
Tournament	2003	2004	2005	2006	2007	2008	2009
The Players Championship	CUT	CUT	T32	T3	CUT	T42	T68

Tournament	2010	2011	2012	2013	2014	2015	2016	2017	2018	2019
The Players Championship	CUT	CUT	T25	CUT	T48	T17		T22	CUT	

Tournament	2020	2021	2022
The Players Championship	C	CUT	T33

Top 10
Did not play

CUT = missed the halfway cut
"T" indicates a tie for a place
C = Canceled after the first round due to the COVID-19 pandemic

== Results in World Golf Championships ==
Results not in chronological order before 2015.

Tournament	2008	2009	2010	2011	2012	2013	2014	2015	2016	2017	2018
Championship		T35								T38	T20
Match Play	R64	R32								T17	T52
Invitational		T22								69	T63
Champions		T10								T24	T37

Top 10
Did not play

QF, R16, R32, R64 = Round in which player lost in match play
"T" = tied
Note that the HSBC Champions did not become a WGC event until 2009.

== Results in senior major championships ==
Tournament	2026
Senior PGA Championship	T5
The Tradition	
U.S. Senior Open	T8
Senior Players Championship	
Senior British Open Championship	T21

Top 10
Did not play

"T" indicates a tie for a place

== See also ==
- 2001 PGA Tour Qualifying School graduates
