= 2008 FedEx Cup Playoffs =

Tournament information
- Dates: August 21 – September 28, 2008
- Location: Ridgewood Country Club; TPC Boston; Bellerive Country Club; East Lake Golf Club
- Tour: PGA Tour

Statistics
- Field: 144 for The Barclays; 120 for Deutsche Bank; 70 for BMW Championship; 30 for Tour Championship
- Prize fund: $35,000,000 bonus money
- Winner's share: $10,000,000 bonus money

Champion
- (Fiji) Vijay Singh
- 125,101 points

The 2008 FedEx Cup Playoffs, the series of four golf tournaments that determined the season champion on the U.S.-based PGA Tour, were held from August 21 to September 28. They consisted of four events:

- The Barclays
- Deutsche Bank Championship
- BMW Championship
- The Tour Championship

These were the second FedEx Cup playoffs since their inception in 2007. After the first three events, Vijay Singh was assured of winning the 2008 FedEx Cup as long as he completed all four rounds of The Tour Championship without disqualification, which he proceeded to do. Tiger Woods, having topped the regular season points list after playing in only six events, did not play in the FedEx Cup Playoffs due to knee surgery.

The point distributions can be seen here.

== Regular season rankings ==
Place	Player	Points	Events	Reset Points
1	(United States) Tiger Woods	22,695	6	100,000
2	(United States) Kenny Perry	20,878	22	99,500
3	(United States) Phil Mickelson	18,241	17	99,250
4	(Republic of Ireland) Pádraig Harrington	15,555	12	99,000
5	(United States) Anthony Kim	15,178	18	98,750
6	(United States) Stewart Cink	15,126	18	98,625
7	(Fiji) Vijay Singh	15,034	19	98,500
8	(United States) Justin Leonard	12,734	20	98,375
9	(Japan) Ryuji Imada	10,903	19	98,250
10	(Australia) Geoff Ogilvy	10,866	17	98,125

For the full list see here

== The Barclays ==
The Barclays was played August 21–24. 144 players were eligible to play but nine did not enter: Tiger Woods (1) – knee, Luke Donald (44) – wrist, Lee Westwood (50) – personal decision, Justin Rose (78) – played KLM Open, Alex Čejka (91) – arm, Jason Bohn (96) – back, Bob Tway (119) – caddied for son Kevin in U.S. Amateur, Bob Estes (124) – getting married, Roland Thatcher (140) – wrist.

Of the 135 players who entered the tournament, 72 of them made the cut at 1-over par. Vijay Singh won in a playoff over Sergio García and Kevin Sutherland. The top 120 players in the points standings advanced to the Deutsche Bank Championship.

					FedEx Cup rank	
Place	Player	Score	To par	Winnings ($)	After	Before
1	(Fiji) Vijay Singh	70-70-66-70=276	−8	1,260,000	1	7
T2	(Spain) Sergio García	70-67-69-70=276	−8	616,000	2	12
T2	(United States) Kevin Sutherland	70-69-69-68=276	−8	616,000	3	57
T4	(United States) Ben Curtis	71-68-70-68=277	−7	289,333	8	27
T4	(Australia) Mathew Goggin	67-74-69-67=277	−7	289,333	26	76
T4	(United States) Kevin Streelman	67-70-68-72=277	−7	289,333	37	102
T7	(England) Paul Casey	66-71-69-72=278	−6	203,700	38	90
T7	(Scotland) Martin Laird	70-69-72-67=278	−6	203,700	67	128
T7	(United States) Justin Leonard	70-70-71-67=278	−6	203,700	5	8
T7	(United States) Nicholas Thompson	75-68-68-67=278	−6	203,700	20	47
T7	(Canada) Mike Weir	72-67-67-72=278	−6	203,700	18	43

Full leaderboard

== Deutsche Bank Championship ==
The Deutsche Bank Championship was played from August 29 to September 1. 120 players were eligible to play but five did not enter: Tiger Woods (15) – knee, Luke Donald (71) – wrist, Lee Westwood (76) and Justin Rose (103) – played the Johnnie Walker Championship at Gleneagles, Alex Čejka (120) – arm.

Of the 115 players who entered the tournament, 86 of them made the 36-hole cut at −3. There was a second, 54-hole cut, that reduced the field to 72 players, again at −3. Vijay Singh, who won the first playoff event, won by shooting a tournament record −22 (262). The top 70 players in the points standings advanced to the BMW Championship.

					FedEx Cup rank	
Place	Player	Score	To par	Winnings ($)	After	Before
1	(Fiji) Vijay Singh	64-66-69-63=262	−22	1,260,000	1	1
2	(Canada) Mike Weir	61-68-67-71=267	−17	756,000	3	18
T3	(South Africa) Ernie Els	66-65-69-70=270	−14	406,000	19	52
T3	(Colombia) Camilo Villegas	68-66-63-73=270	−14	406,000	25	68
T5	(Spain) Sergio García	67-64-68-72=271	−13	266,000	2	2
T5	(United States) Tim Herron	72-67-67-65=271	−13	266,000	48	99
T7	(United States) Chad Campbell	67-70-69-66=272	−12	218,167	14	21
T7	(United States) Jim Furyk	66-65-69-72=272	−12	218,167	5	10
T7	(United States) Justin Leonard	69-70-66-67=272	−12	218,167	4	5
T10	(United States) Ben Crane	72-65-63-73=273	−11	175,000	57	92
T10	(United States) Ken Duke	66-67-70-70=273	−11	175,000	18	28
T10	(United States) Steve Marino	66-66-71-70=273	−11	175,000	37	61

Full leaderboard

== BMW Championship ==
The BMW Championship was played September 4–7. 70 players were eligible to play but one, Tiger Woods (32) – knee, did not enter. There was no cut for this tournament.

Camilo Villegas won by shooting −15. This was Villegas' first win on the PGA Tour. Chad Campbell withdrew after the first round to attend the birth of his first child. He earned no FedEx Cup points but at the end of the BMW Championship he was in 30th place in the standings. The top 30 players in the points standings advanced to The Tour Championship.

					FedEx Cup rank	
Place	Player	Score	To par	Winnings ($)	After	Before
1	(Colombia) Camilo Villegas	65-66-66-68=265	−15	1,260,000	2	25
2	(United States) Dudley Hart	67-69-66-65=267	−13	756,000	14	67
T3	(United States) Jim Furyk	70-62-66-70=268	−12	406,000	4	5
T3	(United States) Anthony Kim	68-67-66-67=268	−12	406,000	6	7
T5	(Canada) Stephen Ames	68-69-66-66=269	−11	255,500	31	50
T5	(South Korea) K. J. Choi	70-68-64-67=269	−11	255,500	8	12
T5	(United States) D. J. Trahan	71-63-68-67=269	−11	255,500	25	35
T8	(South Africa) Tim Clark	67-68-66-69=270	−10	210,000	23	28
T8	(United States) Hunter Mahan	69-67-68-66=270	−10	210,000	16	20
T10	(Australia) Aaron Baddeley	71-64-67-69=271	−9	175,000	43	64
T10	(Sweden) Freddie Jacobson	67-67-72-65=271	−9	175,000	44	65
T10	(United States) Steve Stricker	66-71-68-66=271	−9	175,000	12	13

Full leaderboard

== The Tour Championship ==
The Tour Championship was played September 25–28 after a two-week break for the Ryder Cup. All 30 players eligible to play did so. There was no cut for this tournament. Camilo Villegas won the tournament on the first playoff hole with Sergio García. Vijay Singh won the FedEx Cup.

					FedEx Cup rank	
Place	Player	Score	To par	Winnings ($)	After	Before
1	(Colombia) Camilo Villegas	72-66-69-66=273	−7	1,260,000	2	2
2	(Spain) Sergio García	70-65-67-71=273	−7	756,000	3	3
T3	(United States) Anthony Kim	64-69-72-69=274	−6	409,500	4	6
T3	(United States) Phil Mickelson	68-68-69-69=274	−6	409,500	7	9
5	(United States) Ben Curtis	71-69-68-70=278	−2	280,000	9	10
T6	(South Africa) Ernie Els	68-73-70-69=280	E	238,000	13	21
T6	(United States) Jim Furyk	72-70-69-69=280	E	238,000	5	4
T6	(Canada) Mike Weir	70-69-71-70=280	E	238,000	6	5
9	(South Korea) K. J. Choi	69-70-70-72=281	+1	210,000	10	8
T10	(Australia) Stuart Appleby	72-71-70-69=282	+2	180,040	17	20
T10	(United States) Dudley Hart	73-69-71-69=282	+2	180,040	12	14
T10	(South Africa) Trevor Immelman	68-73-71-70=282	+2	180,040	16	19
T10	(United States) Justin Leonard	73-69-73-67=282	+2	180,040	8	7
T10	(United States) Billy Mayfair	72-71-69-70=282	+2	180,040	23	28

Full leaderboard

== Final leaderboard ==
Place	Player	Points	Winnings ($)
1	(Fiji) Vijay Singh	125,101	10,000,000
2	(Colombia) Camilo Villegas	124,550	3,000,000
3	(Spain) Sergio García	119,400	2,000,000
4	(United States) Anthony Kim	114,419	1,500,000
5	(United States) Jim Furyk	113,180	1,000,000
6	(Canada) Mike Weir	113,118	800,000
7	(United States) Phil Mickelson	112,201	700,000
8	(United States) Justin Leonard	111,638	600,000
9	(United States) Ben Curtis	110,702	550,000
10	(South Korea) K. J. Choi	110,646	500,000

See here for the full lists of (1) Final Playoff Standings and (2) Bonus Pool Prizes

== Table of qualifying players ==
Table key:

Win
Top-10 finish
Did not advance to next tournament
Played way into next tournament

	Player	Pre-Playoffs		The Barclays		Deutsche Bank		BMW Champ.		Tour Champ.	
	Player	Rank	Reset points	Finish	Rank after	Finish	Rank after	Finish	Rank after	Finish	Final rank
(United States)	Tiger Woods	1	100,000	DNP	15	DNP	32	DNP	70	–	70
(United States)	Kenny Perry	2	99,500	T48	7	T80^{†}	9	T44	13	T24	15
(United States)	Phil Mickelson	3	99,250	T19	4	T73^{†}	8	T17	9	T3	7
(Republic of Ireland)	Pádraig Harrington	4	99,000	CUT	23	CUT	44	T55	50	–	50
(United States)	Anthony Kim	5	98,750	T12	6	T27	7	T3	6	T3	4
(United States)	Stewart Cink	6	98,625	T38	9	T33	11	T60	15	T24	20
(Fiji)	Vijay Singh	7	98,500	1	1	1	1	T44	1	T22	1
(United States)	Justin Leonard	8	98,375	T7	5	T7	4	T17	7	T10	8
(Japan)	Ryuji Imada	9	98,250	CUT	31	T13	23	T67	26	T17	25
(Australia)	Geoff Ogilvy	10	98,125	CUT	32	72	30	T28	32	–	32
(Australia)	Robert Allenby	11	98,050	T38	12	T44	16	T38	18	16	19
(Spain)	Sergio García	12	97,975	T2	2	T5	2	T20	3	2	3
(Sweden)	Carl Pettersson	13	97,900	T48	14	T21	15	T33	17	21	21
(United States)	Boo Weekley	14	97,825	CUT	36	T27	31	T28	33	–	33
(United States)	Jim Furyk	15	97,750	T12	10	T7	5	T3	4	T6	5
(United States)	Sean O'Hair	16	97,675	CUT	39	CUT	75	–	–	–	75
(South Korea)	K. J. Choi	17	97,600	T12	11	T21	12	T5	8	9	10
(United States)	D. J. Trahan	18	97,525	CUT	42	T67	35	T5	25	T17	24
(Australia)	Stuart Appleby	19	97,450	T19	13	T33	17	T38	20	T10	17
(South Africa)	Trevor Immelman	20	97,375	70	19	T50	21	T13	19	T10	16
(United States)	Steve Stricker	21	97,300	T19	16	T13	13	T10	12	T24	14
(United States)	J. B. Holmes	22	97,225	T24	17	CUT	36	T33	38	–	38
(United States)	Chad Campbell	23	97,150	T65	21	T7	14	WD	30	T22	29
(Australia)	Adam Scott	24	97,075	CUT	47	T73^{†}	43	T50	47	–	47
(United States)	Jeff Quinney	25	97,000	CUT	50	CUT	88	–	–	–	88
(Argentina)	Andrés Romero*	26	96,925	T55	22	T50	24	T44	27	T27	28
(United States)	Ben Curtis	27	96,850	T4	8	T27	10	T13	10	5	9
(South Africa)	Ernie Els	28	96,775	CUT	52	T3	19	T17	21	T6	13
(United States)	Briny Baird	29	96,700	T48	27	T21	22	T38	24	T27	27
(Canada)	Stephen Ames	30	96,630	CUT	54	T50	50	T5	31	–	31
(United States)	Hunter Mahan	31	96,590	T31	25	T15	20	T8	16	T17	18
(United States)	Bart Bryant	32	96,550	CUT	56	T50	53	T28	54	–	54
(Australia)	Rod Pampling	33	96,510	CUT	58	CUT	98	–	–	–	98
(United States)	Woody Austin	34	96,470	CUT	59	T40	52	T64	58	–	58
(United States)	Chez Reavie*	35	96,430	CUT	60	T63	54	T33	57	–	57
(United States)	Jerry Kelly	36	96,390	T19	24	CUT	45	T60	51	–	51
(United States)	Billy Mayfair	37	96,350	T31	29	T78*	26	T22	28	T10	23
(United States)	Steve Marino	38	96,310	CUT	61	T10	37	T22	36	–	36
(United States)	Brian Gay	39	96,270	CUT	63	T50	58	T13	46	–	46
(Sweden)	Daniel Chopra	40	96,230	CUT	64	CUT	102	–	–	–	102
(United States)	Steve Lowery*	41	96,190	CUT	66	CUT	103	–	–	–	103
(Colombia)	Camilo Villegas	42	96,150	CUT	68	T3	25	1	2	1	2
(Canada)	Mike Weir	43	96,110	T7	18	2	3	T67	5	T6	6
(England)	Luke Donald	44	96,070	DNP	71	DNP	105	–	–	–	105
(Australia)	Aaron Baddeley	45	96,030	CUT	73	T73^{†}	64	T10	43	–	43
(Sweden)	Freddie Jacobson	46	95,990	CUT	74	T67	65	T10	44	–	44
(United States)	Nicholas Thompson*	47	95,950	T7	20	CUT	40	T44	41	–	41
(United States)	Tommy Armour III	48	95,910	CUT	75	T82^{†}	69	T20	62	–	62
(United States)	Brandt Snedeker	49	95,870	T68	35	T27	29	T55	34	–	34
(England)	Lee Westwood*	50	95,830	DNP	76	DNP	106	–	–	–	106
(United States)	Ken Duke	51	95,790	T12	28	T10	18	T33	22	T17	22
(United States)	Johnson Wagner	52	95,750	CUT	78	T15	55	T52	60	–	60
(United States)	Heath Slocum	53	95,710	CUT	79	T15	56	T44	61	–	61
(United States)	Parker McLachlin*	54	95,670	CUT	80	CUT	107	–	–	–	107
(South Africa)	Rory Sabbatini	55	95,630	T24	34	CUT	68	T44	69	–	69
(United States)	Bubba Watson	56	95,590	T12	30	T44	27	T28	29	30	30
(United States)	Kevin Sutherland	57	95,550	T2	3	T50	6	T55	11	15	11
(South Africa)	Retief Goosen	58	95,510	CUT	82	CUT	108	–	–	–	108
(Australia)	Peter Lonard	59	95,470	CUT	84	T73^{†}	76	–	–	–	76
(South Africa)	Tim Clark	60	95,430	T38	40	T15	28	T8	23	29	26
(United States)	Rocco Mediate	61	95,390	CUT	86	T69	78	–	–	–	78
(United States)	Pat Perez	62	95,350	CUT	88	T21	71	–	–	–	71
(England)	Ian Poulter	63	95,310	CUT	89	CUT	112	–	–	–	112
(Australia)	John Senden	64	95,270	T31	41	T33	34	T50	37	–	37
(United States)	Ben Crane*	65	95,230	CUT	92	T10	57	T33	59	–	59
(South Korea)	Charlie Wi	66	95,190	T65	43	T44	39	T64	42	–	42
(United States)	Tom Pernice Jr.	67	95,150	CUT	94	T50	80	–	–	–	80
(United States)	Dudley Hart*	68	95,110	T12	33	CUT	67	2	14	T10	12
(United States)	John Merrick	69	95,070	T38	44	T33	38	T60	40	–	40
(United States)	Dean Wilson	70	95,030	T48	45	T73^{†}	41	T22	39	–	39
(Australia)	Steve Elkington	71	94,990	T55	46	CUT	84	–	–	–	84
(United States)	Paul Goydos	72	94,950	72	48	CUT	85	–	–	–	85
(United States)	Ryan Moore	73	94,910	CUT	98	T78^{†}	87	–	–	–	87
(Australia)	Nick O'Hern	74	94,870	CUT	100	T44	86	–	–	–	86
(United States)	Cliff Kresge	75	94,830	CUT	101	CUT	113	–	–	–	113
(Australia)	Mathew Goggin	76	94,790	T4	26	CUT	47	T38	52	–	52
(United States)	Scott McCarron*	77	94,750	CUT	102	T44	91	–	–	–	91
(England)	Justin Rose	78	94,710	DNP	103	DNP	114	–	–	–	114
(United States)	Charles Howell III	79	94,670	CUT	104	T82^{†}	95	–	–	–	95
(United States)	Mark Wilson	80	94,630	T24	49	T40	42	T64	45	–	45
(United States)	Matt Kuchar	81	94,590	CUT	107	CUT	115	–	–	–	115
(United States)	John Rollins	82	94,550	CUT	109	T40	96	–	–	–	96
(United States)	Kevin Na	83	94,510	T31	51	CUT	93	–	–	–	93
(United States)	Steve Flesch	84	94,470	CUT	113	T15	81	–	–	–	81
(United States)	Jonathan Byrd	85	94,430	T55	57	T33	49	T52	55	–	55
(England)	Brian Davis	86	94,390	T38	55	T50	51	T38	56	–	56
(United States)	Corey Pavin	87	94,350	CUT	114	T82^{†}	100	–	–	–	100
(United States)	Michael Letzig*	88	94,310	CUT	117	CUT	117	–	–	–	117
(United States)	Fred Couples*	89	94,270	CUT	118	CUT	118	–	–	–	118
(England)	Paul Casey*	90	94,230	T7	38	CUT	74	–	–	–	74
(Germany)	Alex Čejka	91	94,190	DNP	120	DNP	120	–	–	–	120
(United States)	John Mallinger	92	94,150	T48	62	T63	59	T55	64	–	64
(United States)	Brad Adamonis*	93	94,110	CUT	121	–	–	–	–	–	121
(Australia)	Nathan Green	94	94,070	CUT	122	–	–	–	–	–	122
(United States)	Lucas Glover	95	94,030	T55	69	T50	62	T13	49	–	49
(United States)	Jason Bohn	96	93,990	DNP	123	–	–	–	–	–	123
(United States)	Troy Matteson	97	93,950	CUT	124	–	–	–	–	–	124
(United States)	Jay Williamson*	98	93,910	T31	65	T80^{†}	60	T52	66	–	66
(United States)	Eric Axley*	99	93,870	T38	72	T82^{†}	63	T22	63	–	63
(United States)	Scott Verplank	100	93,830	T12	53	T63	46	T28	48	–	48
(United States)	George McNeill	101	93,790	T31	70	CUT	104	–	–	–	104
(United States)	Kevin Streelman*	102	93,750	T4	37	T50	33	T22	35	–	35
(United States)	Greg Kraft*	103	93,710	CUT	125	–	–	–	–	–	125
(United States)	Mark Calcavecchia	104	93,670	CUT	126	–	–	–	–	–	126
(United States)	Charley Hoffman	105	93,630	T38	77	T33	66	T60	68	–	68
(Australia)	Matt Jones*	106	93,590	CUT	127	–	–	–	–	–	127
(United States)	Bill Haas	107	93,550	T55	81	T69	73	–	–	–	73
(United States)	Shane Bertsch*	108	93,510	CUT	128	–	–	–	–	–	128
(United States)	Joe Ogilvie	109	93,470	CUT	129	–	–	–	–	–	129
(New Zealand)	Tim Wilkinson*	110	93,430	CUT	130	–	–	–	–	–	130
(United States)	Nick Watney	111	93,390	T62	83	CUT	109	–	–	–	109
(United States)	Zach Johnson	112	93,350	CUT	131	–	–	–	–	–	131
(United States)	Vaughn Taylor	113	93,310	CUT	132	–	–	–	–	–	132
(United States)	Rich Beem	114	93,270	T55	87	CUT	111	–	–	–	111
(United States)	Charles Warren	115	93,230	CUT	133	–	–	–	–	–	133
(United States)	Bo Van Pelt	116	93,190	71	91	T44	79	–	–	–	79
(United States)	Dustin Johnson*	117	93,150	CUT	134	–	–	–	–	–	134
(United States)	Brett Quigley	118	93,110	T38	90	T21	72	–	–	–	72
(United States)	Bob Tway	119	93,070	DNP	135	–	–	–	–	–	135
(United States)	Patrick Sheehan*	120	93,030	T24	85	CUT	110	–	–	–	110
(United States)	David Toms	121	92,990	CUT	136	–	–	–	–	–	136
(Sweden)	Richard S. Johnson*	122	92,950	T68	95	T21	77	–	–	–	77
(United States)	James Driscoll*	123	92,910	CUT	137	–	–	–	–	–	137
(United States)	Bob Estes	124	92,870	DNP	138	–	–	–	–	–	138
(United States)	Tom Lehman	125	92,830	CUT	139	–	–	–	–	–	139
(United States)	Tim Petrovic	126	92,790	T38	97	T40	82	–	–	–	82
(Australia)	Jason Day*	127	92,750	T31	96	T50	83	–	–	–	83
(Scotland)	Martin Laird*	128	92,710	T7	67	T50	61	T55	67	–	67
(United States)	Joe Durant	129	92,670	CUT	140	–	–	–	–	–	140
(United States)	Jason Gore	130	92,630	CUT	141	–	–	–	–	–	141
(Argentina)	Ángel Cabrera	131	92,590	T19	93	T15	70	T22	65	–	65
(United States)	Ryan Palmer	132	92,550	T62	106	T50	94	–	–	–	94
(United States)	Tim Herron	133	92,510	T24	99	T5	48	T38	53	–	53
(United States)	Michael Allen*	134	92,470	T65	108	T27	90	–	–	–	90
(United States)	J. J. Henry	135	92,430	T55	110	T27	92	–	–	–	92
(United States)	Frank Lickliter	136	92,390	64	112	T69	97	–	–	–	97
(Canada)	Jon Mills*	137	92,350	CUT	142	–	–	–	–	–	142
(United States)	Chris DiMarco	138	92,310	CUT	143	–	–	–	–	–	143
(Sweden)	Jesper Parnevik	139	92,270	T24	105	T33	89	–	–	–	89
(United States)	Roland Thatcher*	140	92,230	DNP	144	–	–	–	–	–	144
(United States)	Justin Bolli*	141	92,190	T48	116	T82^{†}	101	–	–	–	101
(United States)	Jeff Overton	142	92,150	T38	115	T63	99	–	–	–	99
(United States)	Glen Day*	143	92,110	T24	111	CUT	116	–	–	–	116
(United States)	Lee Janzen*	144	92,070	T48	119	CUT	119	–	–	–	119

* First-time Playoffs qualifier
^{†} MDF – made cut, did not finish (i.e. cut after third round)
