= Westchester Country Club =

Country club in Harrison, New York, US

Coordinates: 40°59′54″N 73°42′0″W

- Interactive map of Westchester Country Club

Club information
- Location: Harrison, New York, at 99 Biltmore Avenue, Rye, New York, U.S.
- Established: 1922
- Type: Private
- Total holes: 36
- Tournaments: U.S. Women's Amateur (1923, 2021); Thunderbird Classic (1963–65); Westchester Classic (later Buick Classic, and now The Northern Trust) (1967–2007); Senior Players Championship (2011); Women's PGA Championship (2015)
- Website: westchestercc.org

South Course
- Designed by: Walter Travis
- Par: 71
- Length: 6,566 yards
- Course rating: 71.7

West Course
- Designed by: Walter Travis
- Par: 72
- Length: 6,752 yards
- Course rating: 73.5
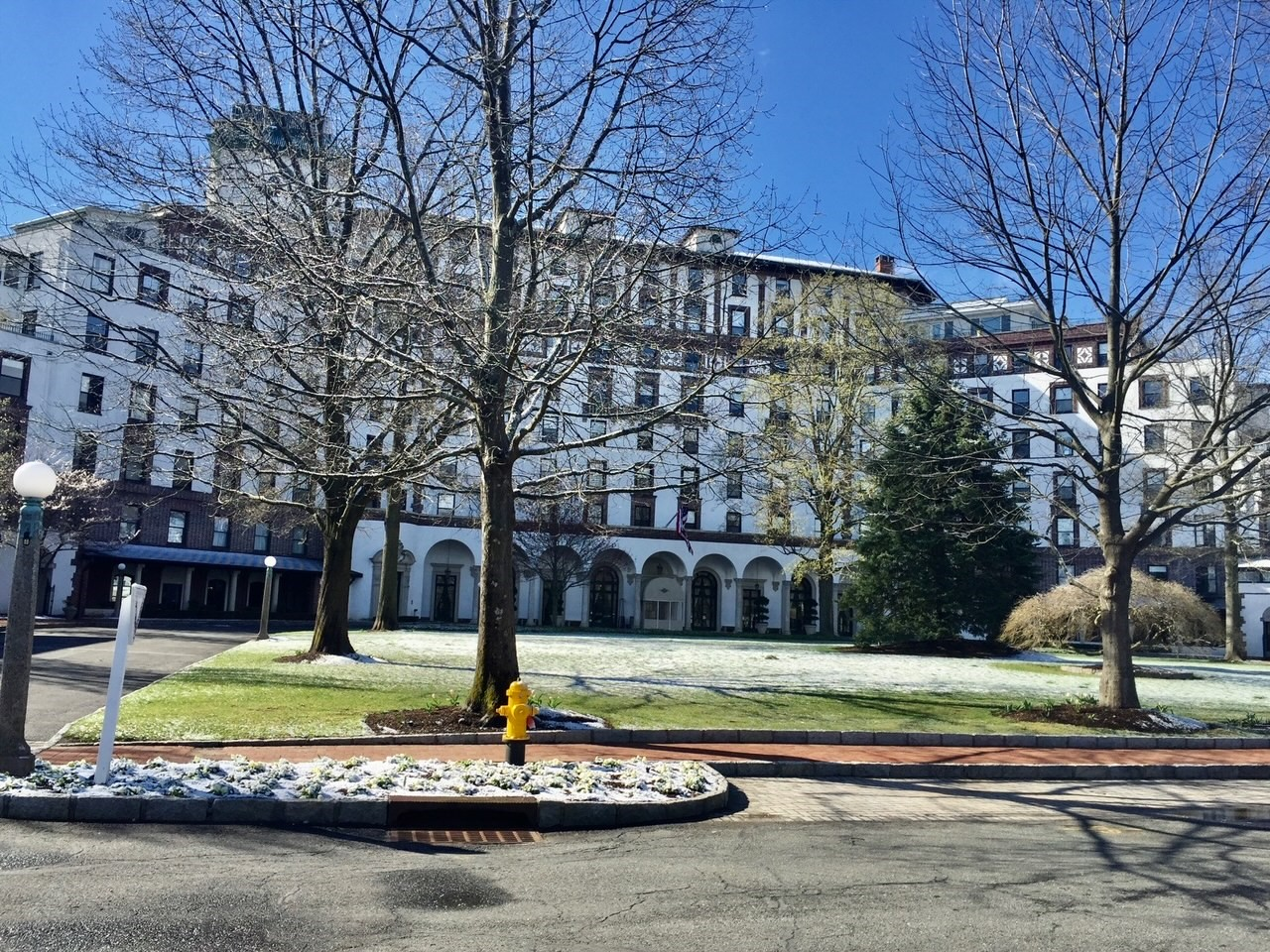
- The main clubhouse in 2022.

Westchester Country Club is a private country club located in Harrison, New York. Founded in 1922 as a destination for sportsmen, it was known to professional golfers and spectators for more than four decades as the home of the Westchester Classic until the tournament was relocated and renamed in 2007. Amenities include an historic clubhouse designed by architects Warren and Wetmore and two championship caliber 18-hole golf courses designed by Walter Travis. The club also boasts one nine-hole golf course, an indoor swimming pool, squash courts, grass tennis courts and a stand-alone beach, outdoor pool and restaurant facility on Manursing Island.

== History ==
The Westchester Biltmore Country Club was the dream of hotelier John McEntee Bowman. Bowman purchased the former 650-acre Hobart Park Estate and planned a place to which businessmen from the New York metropolitan area could commute easily and pursue golf, riding, polo, tennis and more.

The West Course was designed for championship play and has hosted PGA tournaments since 1963. The South Course was originally designed for women and higher handicap golfers. Around 1997, the South Course was reconstructed with longer tees, new sand and grass bunkers, water hazards, and some new greens. The South Course is now more competitive with the West Course to accommodate low handicap golfers.

From 1927 until 1945 the club hosted the Eastern Grass Court Championships tennis tournament.

== Tournaments ==
- Westchester Country Club hosted the U.S. Women's Amateur in 1923, which was won by Edith Cummings.
- Today's PGA Northern Trust tournament was played at Westchester for many years. The tournament had its beginnings at neighboring Apawamis as a one-day pro-amateur benefiting the now defunct United Hospital of Port Chester. Founded by William Mitchell "Bill" Jennings, it was the precursor of the Thunderbird Classic and quickly became a "Westchester Classic". The Thunderbird was a success in 1963 and also in 1964 and 1965. There was no tour event at Westchester in 1966, and starting in 1967, the Westchester Classic became an annual stop on the PGA Tour through 2007.

Jack Nicklaus won the rain-delayed inaugural event (and $50,000) on a Wednesday, and Steve Stricker the last, the initial event of the first FedEx Cup Playoffs. On January 14, 2008, an article in the Journal News announced the PGA Tour's desire to terminate its affiliation with Westchester Country Club. The decision was made primarily because of Tiger Woods' absence in the tournament in 2007 (following his consecutive victories in the WGC-Bridgestone and PGA Championship), and the tournament's subsequent low TV ratings and low attendance. On January 26, a compromise agreement was made between the club and the PGA Tour at a town hall meeting at the club; WCC was paid $1.1 million to move the event from Harrison to Ridgewood Country Club in Paramus, New Jersey, for 2008. The tournament name has changed several times since then due to sponsorship switches.

- In a second compromise agreement, the PGA Tour awarded Westchester a major tournament on the Champions Tour. The Constellation Energy Senior Players Championship was played on the renovated West Course in 2011, won by Fred Couples.
- In June 2015, Westchester hosted its first LPGA major, the KPMG Women's PGA Championship, won by Inbee Park.
- Westchester hosted a second U.S. Women's Amateur in 2021.

== Image gallery ==
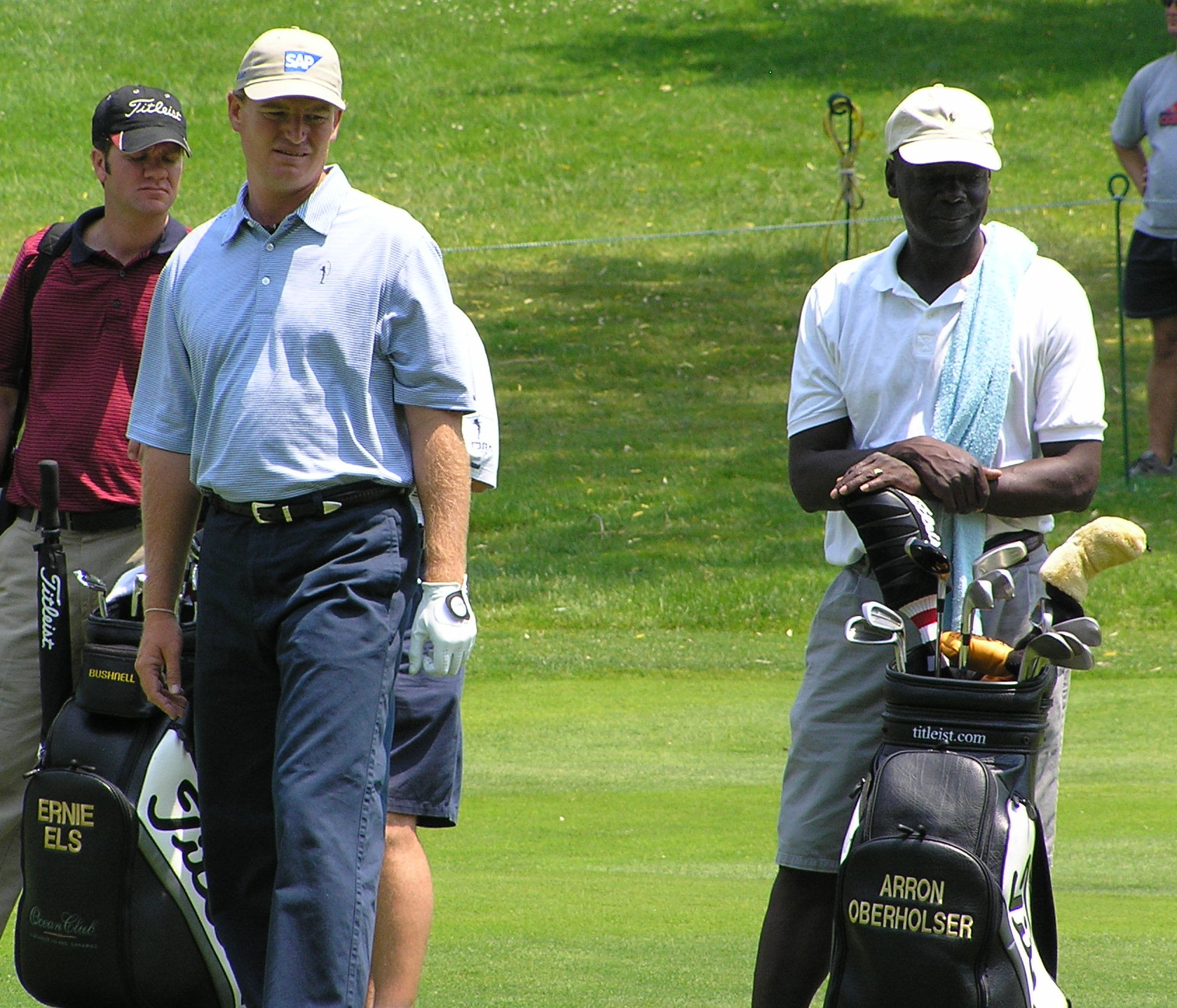
Ernie Els and Club Caddie Trevor Spencer during the 2006 Buick Classic

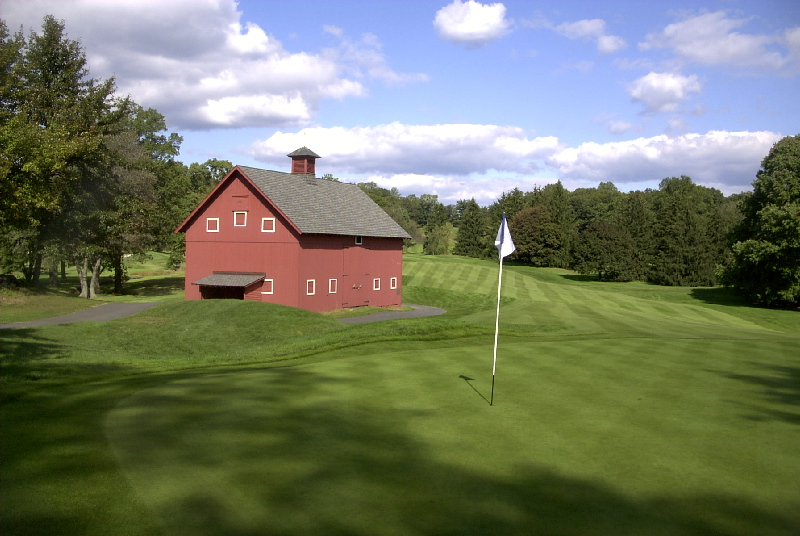
9th hole, South Course

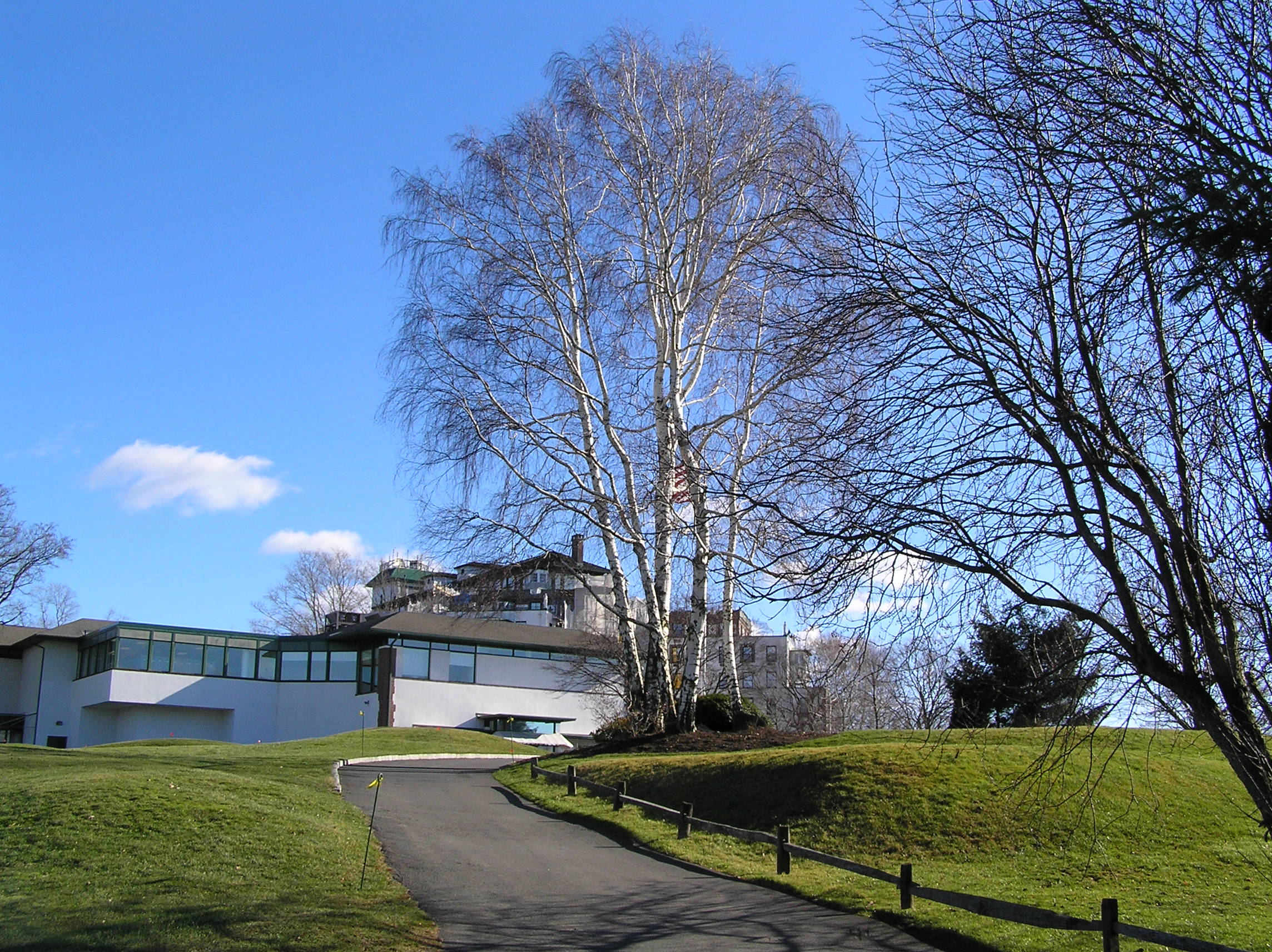
Christmas Eve 2006

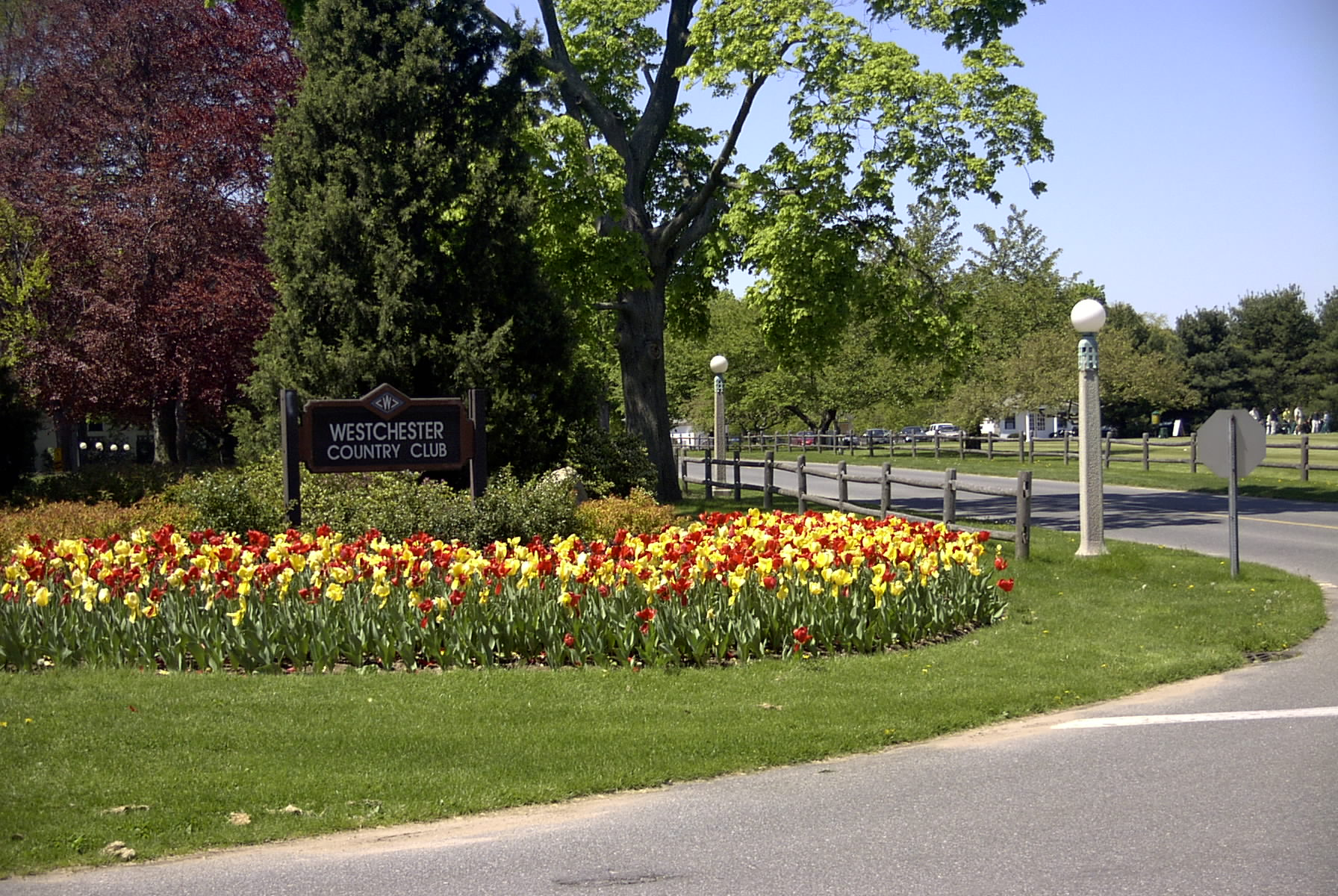
flower bed

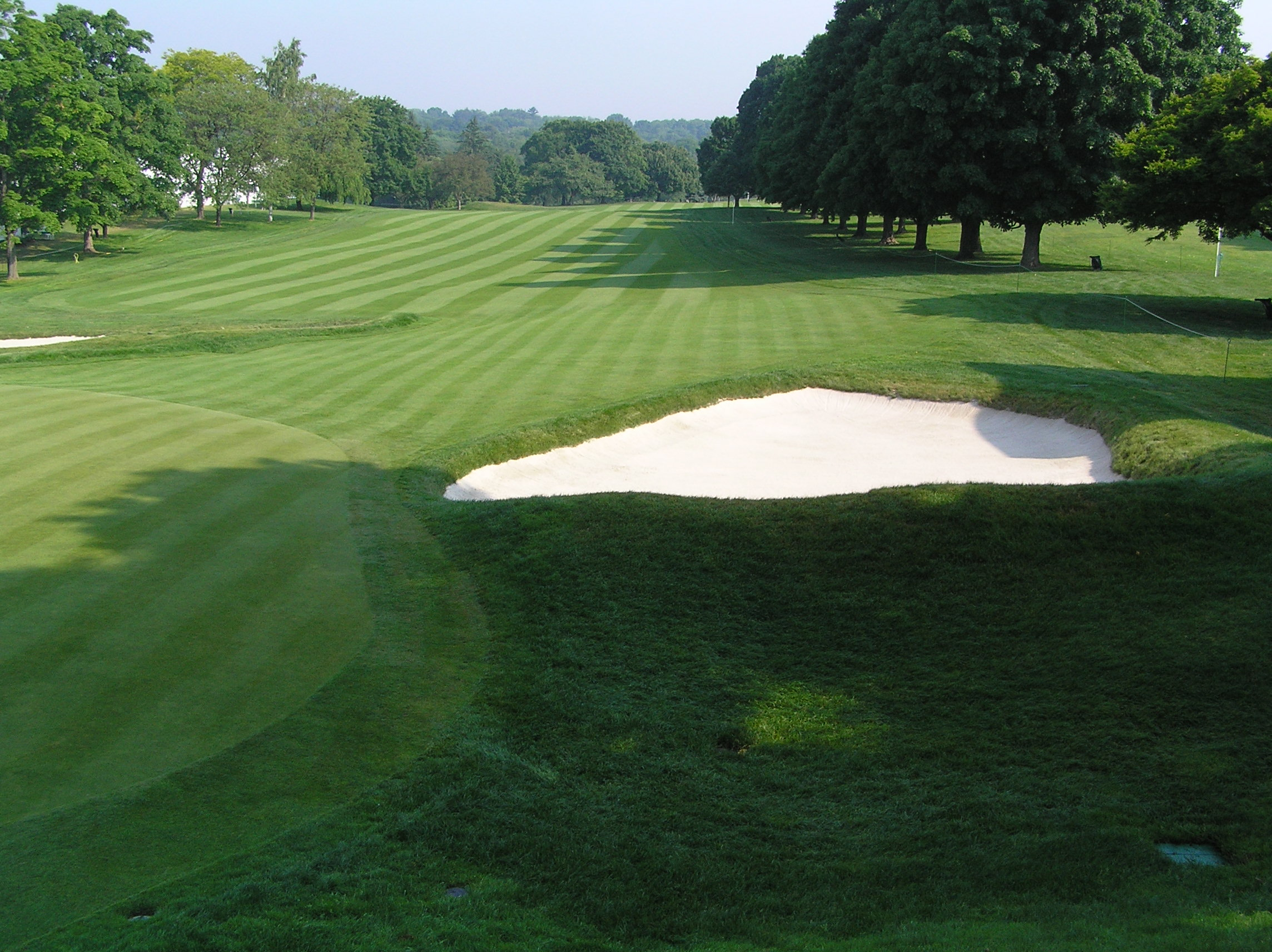
9th hole, West Course

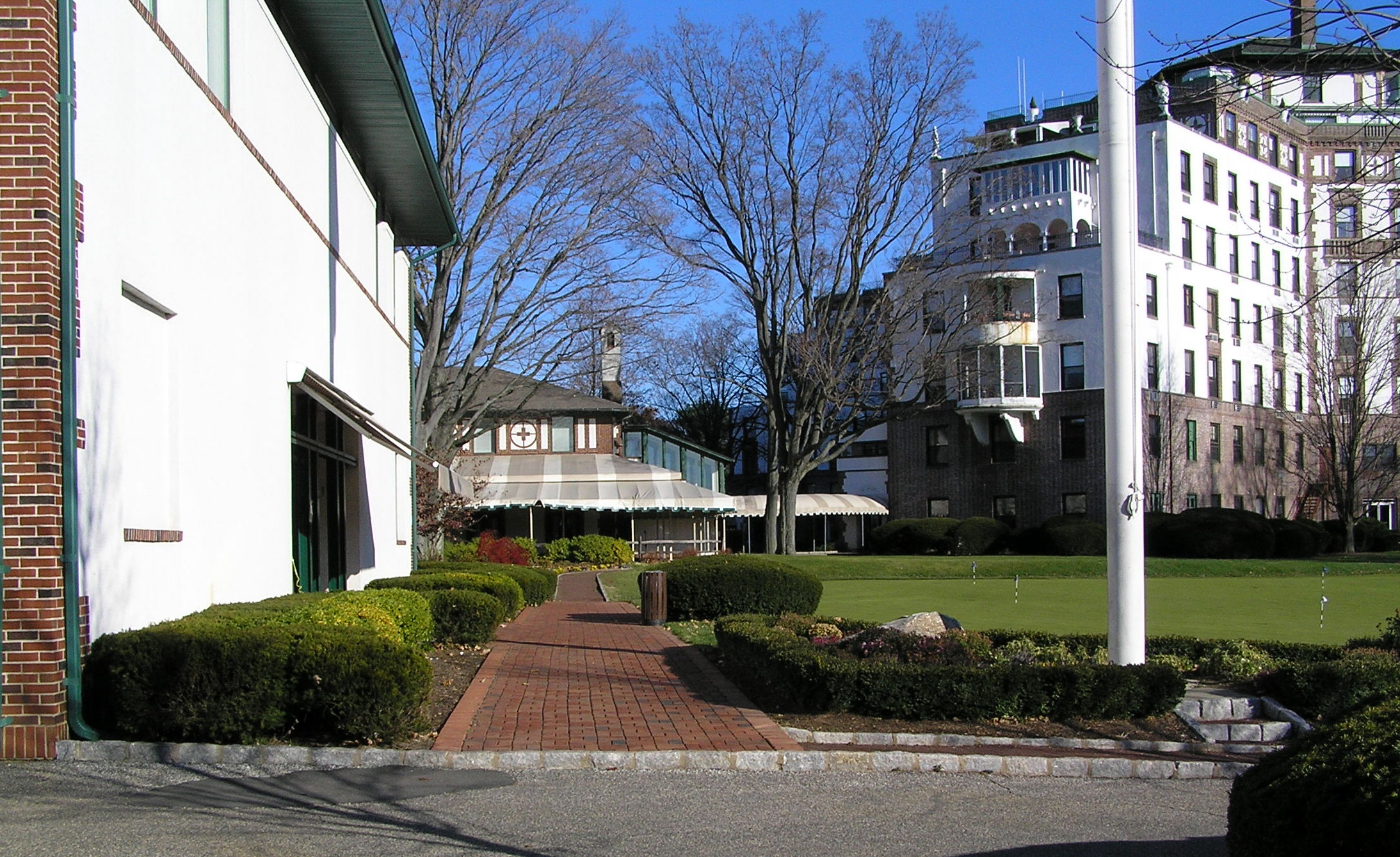
view heading towards pro shop

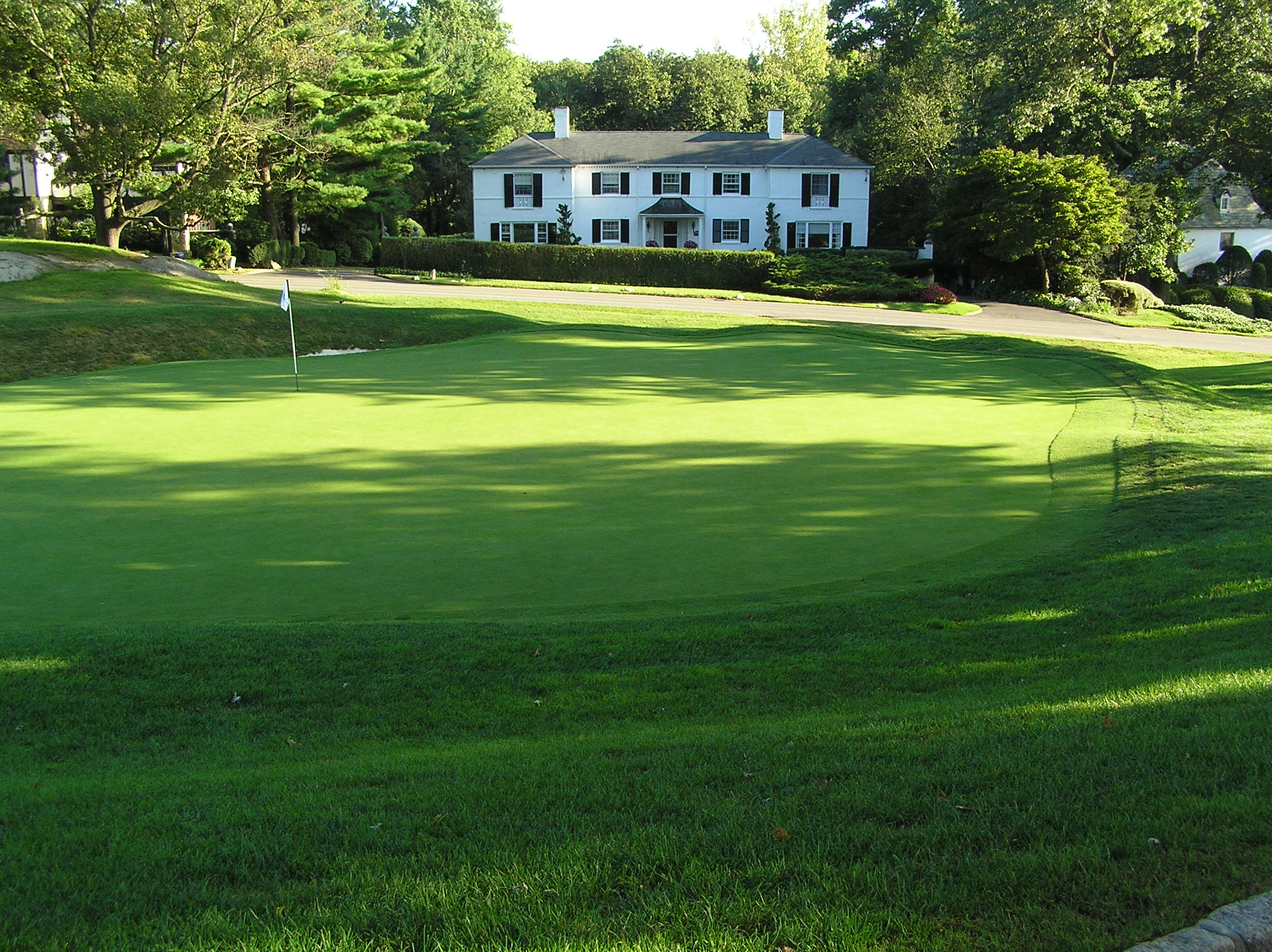
3rd green, South Course

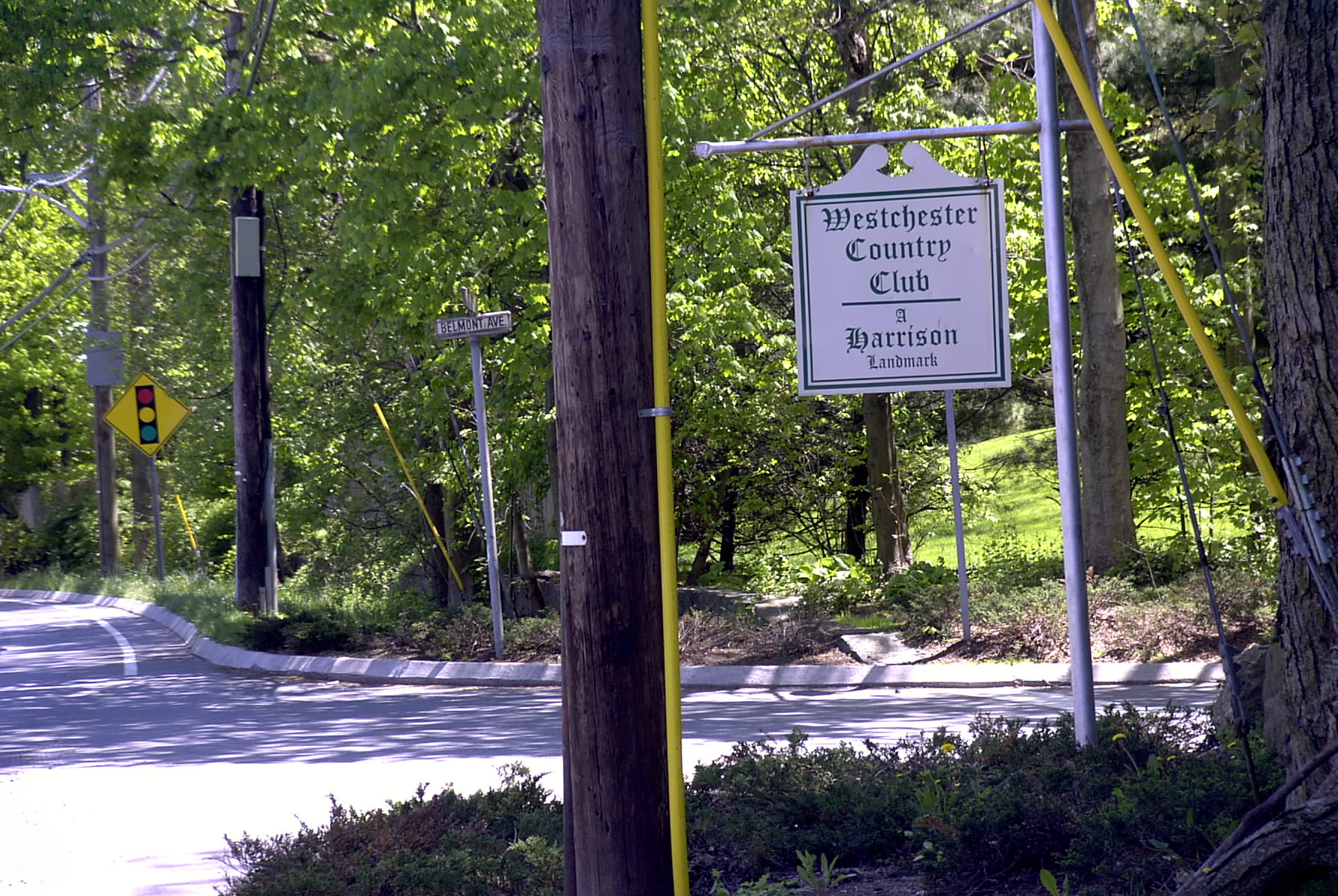
PollyPark Road Entrance

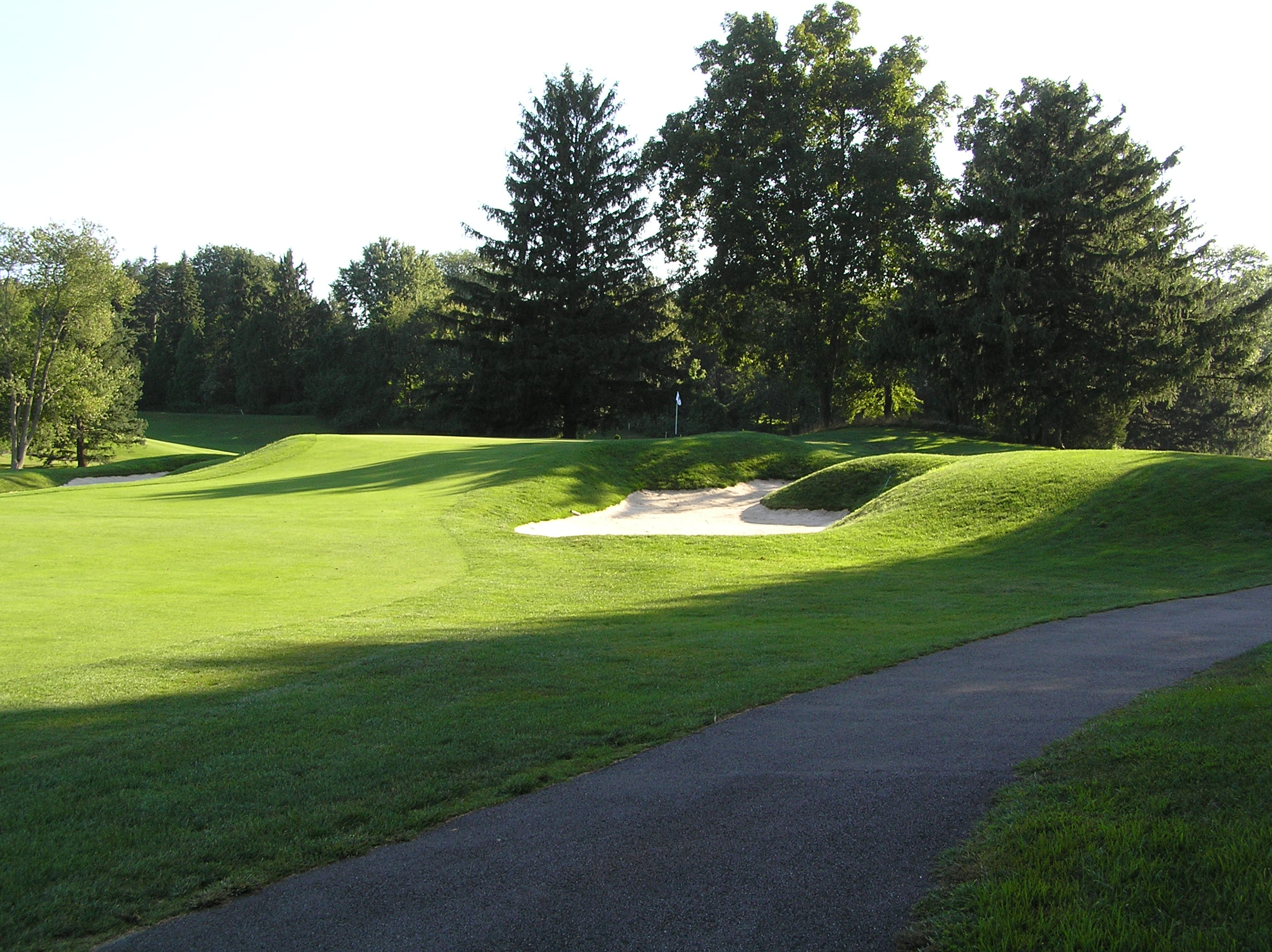
9th hole, South Course
