= Toyokazu =

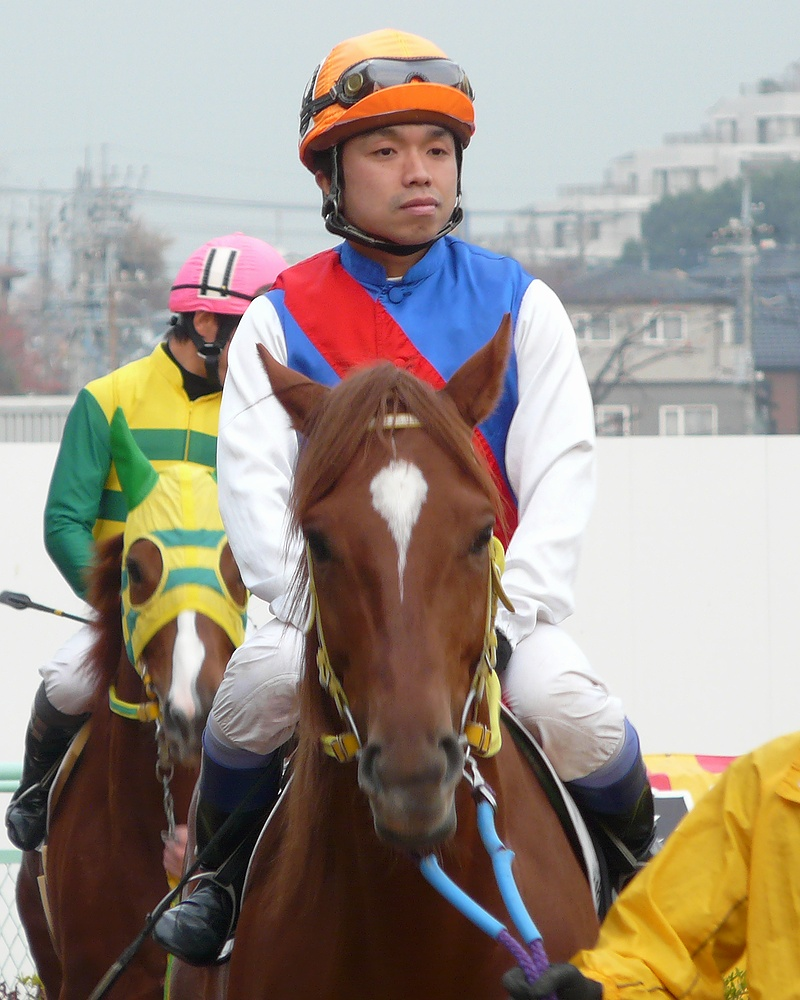
- Toyokazu Orikasa, Japanese jockey, 2010
- Pronunciation: tojokadzɯ (IPA)
- Gender: Male

Origin
- Origin: Japanese
- Meaning: Different meanings depending on the kanji used

Toyokazu is a masculine Japanese given name.

== Written forms ==
Toyokazu can be written using different combinations of kanji characters. Here are some examples:

- 豊一, "bountiful, one"
- 豊多, "bountiful, many"
- 豊和, "bountiful, harmony"
- 豊数, "bountiful, number"

The name can also be written in hiragana とよかず or katakana トヨカズ.

== Notable people with the name ==
- Toyokazu Fujishima (藤島 豊和, born 1981), Japanese golfer.
- Toyokazu Nomura (野村 豊和, born 1949), Japanese judoka.
- Toyokazu Orikasa (折笠 豊和, born 1977), Japanese jockey.
