= Golf at the 2002 Asian Games – Men's team =

Men's team golf event at Asian Games

Men's team at the 2002 Asian Games
- Venue: Asiad Country Club
- Date: 3 October 2002 – 6 October 2002
- Competitors: 63 from 16 nations

Medalists
gold medal	Chinese Taipei; Chang Hong-wei, Cheng Chen-liang, Kao Bo-song, Sung Mao-chang
silver medal	South Korea; Kim Byung-kwan, Kim Hyun-woo, Kwon Ki-taek, Sung Si-woo
bronze medal	Japan; Toyokazu Fujishima, Futoshi Fujita, Riki Ikeda, Yūsaku Miyazato

The men's team competition at the 2002 Asian Games in Busan was held from 3 October to 6 October at the Asiad Country Club.

== Schedule ==
All times are Korea Standard Time (UTC+09:00)

Date	Time	Event
Thursday, 3 October 2002	09:00	Round 1
Friday, 4 October 2002	09:00	Round 2
Saturday, 5 October 2002	09:00	Round 3
Sunday, 6 October 2002	09:00	Round 4

== Results ==
Legend

- DNS — Did not start

Rank	Team	Round				Total	To par
Rank	Team	1	2	3	4	Total	To par
1st place, gold medalist(s)	Chinese Taipei (TPE)	218	209	223	224	874	+10
	Chang Hong-wei	75	67	74	~~82~~		
	Cheng Chen-liang	70	72	75	75		
	Kao Bo-song	73	~~74~~	~~77~~	79		
	Sung Mao-chang	~~80~~	70	74	70		
2nd place, silver medalist(s)	South Korea (KOR)	230	218	218	218	884	+20
	Kim Byung-kwan	~~79~~	74	74	72		
	Kim Hyun-woo	76	~~75~~	68	73		
	Kwon Ki-taek	76	73	~~77~~	~~75~~		
	Sung Si-woo	78	71	76	73		
3rd place, bronze medalist(s)	Japan (JPN)	225	212	217	231	885	+21
	Toyokazu Fujishima	76	71	72	~~80~~		
	Futoshi Fujita	~~81~~	71	~~77~~	78		
	Riki Ikeda	71	~~78~~	74	80		
	Yūsaku Miyazato	78	70	71	73		
4	India (IND)	226	227	223	226	902	+38
	Manav Das	74	74	~~84~~	75		
	Harendra Prasad Gupta	~~82~~	78	80	~~91~~		
	Shiv Kapur	70	75	69	70		
	Keshav Misra	82	~~80~~	74	81		
5	Sri Lanka (SRI)	223	218	223	238	902	+38
	Tissa Chandradasa	74	73	72	82		
	Lalith Kumara	78	75	78	83		
	Anura Rohana	71	70	73	73		
6	Philippines (PHI)	225	231	232	221	909	+45
	Jerome Delariarte	76	77	80	72		
	Marlon Dizon	~~79~~	~~78~~	79	~~84~~		
	Juvic Pagunsan	75	77	73	79		
	Angelo Que	74	77	~~82~~	70		
7	Thailand (THA)	233	222	226	231	912	+48
	Wisut Artjanawat	78	76	75	~~81~~		
	Chaddanai Choksuwanlap	77	~~78~~	~~79~~	73		
	Prom Meesawat	78	71	73	79		
	Dejpon Poolpun	~~82~~	75	78	79		
8	Malaysia (MAS)	227	221	236	229	913	+49
	Shaaban Hussin	75	71	80	76		
	Lim Eng Seng	~~83~~	~~78~~	77	78		
	Shaiful Saedin	75	75	79	~~84~~		
	Siva Chandhran Supramaniam	77	75	~~82~~	75		
9	China (CHN)	231	227	229	228	915	+51
	Liao Guiming	77	~~82~~	76	~~83~~		
	Liu Qiang	75	81	77	77		
	Wu Kangchun	~~79~~	71	~~81~~	78		
	Yuan Hao	79	75	76	73		
10	Bahrain (BRN)	239	227	235	244	945	+81
	Hamad Mubarak Al-Afnan	78	73	82	76		
	Abdulla Mubarak	83	79	83	~~87~~		
	Daij Mubarak	~~86~~	~~80~~	~~86~~	87		
	Nasser Mubarak	78	75	70	81		
11	Brunei (BRU)	230	235	244	251	960	+96
	Hj Shaminan Hj Damit	78	82	86	86		
	Mustapha Hj Dollah	~~82~~	~~83~~	~~88~~	~~99~~		
	Hj Arfian Abdul Kadir	77	81	76	85		
	Seruji Hj Setia	75	72	82	80		
12	Lebanon (LIB)	231	242	245	246	964	+100
	Rachid Akl	77	81	82	~~86~~		
	Mazen Hamdan	80	76	85	83		
	Ali Hammoud	74	85	78	80		
	Karim Sinno	~~95~~	~~90~~	~~85~~	83		
13	North Korea (PRK)	250	233	235	250	968	+104
	Kim Jung-gwang	84	77	78	85		
	Kim Myong-chan	83	81	~~83~~	78		
	Ri Chung-nam	83	~~82~~	75	87		
	Sim Te-su	~~90~~	75	82	~~94~~		
14	Nepal (NEP)	254	260	252	250	1016	+152
	Deep Bahadur Basnet	87	~~94~~	86	~~95~~		
	Chuda Bahadur Bhandari	79	84	83	84		
	Tashi Ghale	~~91~~	88	83	83		
	Raj Pradhan	88	88	~~93~~	83		
15	Qatar (QAT)	265	257	263	292	1077	+213
	Tariq Abu-Mooza	85	82	85	98		
	Ghanem Al-Kuwari	88	89	87	~~DNS~~		
	Mohammed Al-Kuwari	92	86	91	104		
	Fahad Al-Naimi	~~94~~	~~90~~	~~101~~	90		
16	Macau (MAC)	274	273	282	304	1133	+269
	Chan M. K.	98	~~107~~	91	100		
	Chan Sio Peng	86	86	89	92		
	João de Senna Fernandes	~~102~~	85	102	~~DNS~~		
	Shiga Shinichi	90	102	~~103~~	112		
