= 2008 PGA Tour =

Golf tour season

2008 PGA Tour season
- Duration: January 3, 2008 – November 9, 2008
- Number of official events: 48
- Most wins: (United States) Tiger Woods (4)
- FedEx Cup: (Fiji) Vijay Singh
- Money list: (Fiji) Vijay Singh
- PGA Tour Player of the Year: (Republic of Ireland) Pádraig Harrington
- PGA Player of the Year: (Republic of Ireland) Pádraig Harrington
- Rookie of the Year: (Argentina) Andrés Romero

The 2008 PGA Tour was the 93rd season of the PGA Tour, the main professional golf tour in the United States. It was also the 40th season since separating from the PGA of America, and the second edition of the FedEx Cup.

== Schedule ==
The following table lists official events during the 2008 season.

Date	Tournament	Location	Purse (US$)	Winner (Note: The number in parentheses after each winner's name is the number of PGA Tour events they had won up to and including that tournament. This information is only shown for PGA Tour members.)	OWGR points	Notes
Jan 6	Mercedes-Benz Championship	Hawaii	5,500,000	(Sweden) Daniel Chopra (2)	48	Winners-only event
Jan 13	Sony Open in Hawaii	Hawaii	5,300,000	(South Korea) K. J. Choi (7)	50	
Jan 20	Bob Hope Chrysler Classic	California	5,100,000	(United States) D. J. Trahan (2)	34	Pro-Am
Jan 27	Buick Invitational	California	5,200,000	(United States) Tiger Woods (62)	60	
Feb 3	FBR Open	Arizona	6,000,000	(United States) J. B. Holmes (2)	58	
Feb 10	AT&T Pebble Beach National Pro-Am	California	6,000,000	(United States) Steve Lowery (3)	40	Pro-Am
Feb 17	Northern Trust Open	California	6,200,000	(United States) Phil Mickelson (33)	68	
Feb 24	WGC-Accenture Match Play Championship	Arizona	8,000,000	(United States) Tiger Woods (63)	76	World Golf Championship
Feb 24	Mayakoba Golf Classic	Mexico	3,500,000	(United States) Brian Gay (1)	24	Alternate event
Mar 2	The Honda Classic	Florida	5,500,000	(South Africa) Ernie Els (16)	48	
Mar 9	PODS Championship	Florida	5,300,000	(United States) Sean O'Hair (2)	52	
Mar 16	Arnold Palmer Invitational	Florida	5,800,000	(United States) Tiger Woods (64)	62	Invitational
Mar 24	WGC-CA Championship	Florida	8,000,000	(Australia) Geoff Ogilvy (4)	76	World Golf Championship
Mar 23	Puerto Rico Open	Puerto Rico	3,500,000	(United States) Greg Kraft (1)	24	New to PGA Tour; Alternate event
Mar 30	Zurich Classic of New Orleans	Louisiana	6,200,000	(Argentina) Andrés Romero (1)	46	
Apr 6	Shell Houston Open	Texas	5,600,000	(United States) Johnson Wagner (1)	52	
Apr 13	Masters Tournament	Georgia	7,000,000	(South Africa) Trevor Immelman (2)	100	Major championship
Apr 20	Verizon Heritage	South Carolina	5,500,000	(United States) Boo Weekley (2)	54	Invitational
Apr 27	EDS Byron Nelson Championship	Texas	6,400,000	(Australia) Adam Scott (6)	44	
May 4	Wachovia Championship	North Carolina	6,400,000	(United States) Anthony Kim (1)	66	
May 11	The Players Championship	Florida	9,500,000	(Spain) Sergio García (7)	80	Flagship event
May 18	AT&T Classic	Georgia	5,500,000	(Japan) Ryuji Imada (1)	26	
May 25	Crowne Plaza Invitational at Colonial	Texas	6,100,000	(United States) Phil Mickelson (34)	54	Invitational
Jun 1	Memorial Tournament	Ohio	6,000,000	(United States) Kenny Perry (10)	62	Invitational
Jun 8	Stanford St. Jude Championship	Tennessee	6,000,000	(United States) Justin Leonard (12)	44	
Jun 15	U.S. Open	California	7,000,000	(United States) Tiger Woods (65)	100	Major championship
Jun 22	Travelers Championship	Connecticut	6,000,000	(United States) Stewart Cink (5)	36	
Jun 29	Buick Open	Michigan	5,000,000	(United States) Kenny Perry (11)	34	
Jul 6	AT&T National	Maryland	6,000,000	(United States) Anthony Kim (2)	48	Invitational
Jul 13	John Deere Classic	Illinois	4,200,000	(United States) Kenny Perry (12)	32	
Jul 20	The Open Championship	England	£4,200,000	(Republic of Ireland) Pádraig Harrington (4)	100	Major championship
Jul 20	U.S. Bank Championship in Milwaukee	Wisconsin	4,000,000	(Sweden) Richard S. Johnson (1)	24	Alternate event
Jul 27	RBC Canadian Open	Canada	5,000,000	(United States) Chez Reavie (1)	30	
Aug 3	WGC-Bridgestone Invitational	Ohio	8,000,000	(Fiji) Vijay Singh (32)	74	World Golf Championship
Aug 3	Legends Reno–Tahoe Open	Nevada	3,000,000	(United States) Parker McLachlin (1)	24	Alternate event
Aug 10	PGA Championship	Michigan	7,500,000	(Republic of Ireland) Pádraig Harrington (5)	100	Major championship
Aug 17	Wyndham Championship	North Carolina	5,100,000	(Sweden) Carl Pettersson (3)	30	
Aug 24	The Barclays	New Jersey	7,000,000	(Fiji) Vijay Singh (33)	72	FedEx Cup playoff event
Sep 1	Deutsche Bank Championship	Massachusetts	7,000,000	(Fiji) Vijay Singh (34)	70	FedEx Cup playoff event
Sep 7	BMW Championship	Missouri	7,000,000	(Colombia) Camilo Villegas (1)	66	FedEx Cup playoff event
Sep 21	Viking Classic	Mississippi	3,600,000	(United States) Will MacKenzie (2)	24	Fall Series
Sep 28	The Tour Championship	Georgia	7,000,000	(Colombia) Camilo Villegas (2)	54	FedEx Cup playoff event
Oct 5	Turning Stone Resort Championship	New York	6,000,000	(United States) Dustin Johnson (1)	26	Fall Series
Oct 12	Valero Texas Open	Texas	4,500,000	(United States) Zach Johnson (4)	28	Fall Series
Oct 19	Justin Timberlake Shriners Hospitals for Children Open	Nevada	4,100,000	(United States) Marc Turnesa (1)	34	Fall Series
Oct 26	Frys.com Open	Arizona	5,000,000	(United States) Cameron Beckman (2)	30	Fall Series
Nov 2	Ginn sur Mer Classic	Florida	4,600,000	(United States) Ryan Palmer (2)	24	Fall Series
Nov 9	Children's Miracle Network Classic	Florida	4,600,000	(United States) Davis Love III (20)	32	Fall Series

=== Unofficial events ===
The following events were sanctioned by the PGA Tour, but did not carry FedEx Cup points or official money, nor were wins official.

Date	Tournament	Location	Purse ($)	Winner(s)	Notes
Mar 25	Tavistock Cup	Florida	2,600,000	Team Isleworth	Team event
Jun 24	CVS Caremark Charity Classic	Rhode Island	1,350,000	(Colombia) Camilo Villegas and (United States) Bubba Watson	Team event
Sep 21	Ryder Cup	Kentucky	n/a	Team USA	Team event
Oct 15	PGA Grand Slam of Golf	Bermuda	1,350,000	(United States) Jim Furyk	Limited-field event
Oct 28	Kiwi Challenge	New Zealand	2,600,000	(United States) Hunter Mahan	Limited-field event
Nov 11	Wendy's 3-Tour Challenge	Nevada	1,000,000	Champions Tour	Team event
Nov 30	Omega Mission Hills World Cup	China	5,500,000	(Sweden) Robert Karlsson and (Sweden) Henrik Stenson	Team event
Nov 30	LG Skins Game	California	1,000,000	(South Korea) K. J. Choi	Limited-field event
Dec 14	Merrill Lynch Shootout	Florida	3,000,000	(United States) Scott Hoch and (United States) Kenny Perry	Team event
Dec 21	Chevron World Challenge	California	5,750,000	(Fiji) Vijay Singh	Limited-field event

== Location of tournaments ==
Location of official tournaments of the 2008 PGA Tour in the continental United States and Canada.
4,950-point event (Players & Majors)
4,725-point event (World Golf Championships)
4,500-point event (Regular events)
2,250-point event (Alternate events)
FedEx Cup playoff event
Fall Series event
Location of official tournaments of the 2008 PGA Tour outside the continental United States and Canada.
4,950-point event (Players & Majors)
4,500-point event (Regular events)
2,250-point event (Alternate events)

== FedEx Cup ==
=== Final standings ===
For full rankings, see 2008 FedEx Cup Playoffs.

Final top 10 players in the FedEx Cup:

Position	Player	Points	Bonus money ($)
1	(Fiji) Vijay Singh	125,101	10,000,000
2	(Colombia) Camilo Villegas	124,550	3,000,000
3	(Spain) Sergio García	119,400	2,000,000
4	(United States) Anthony Kim	114,419	1,500,000
5	(United States) Jim Furyk	113,180	1,000,000
6	(Canada) Mike Weir	113,118	800,000
7	(United States) Phil Mickelson	112,201	700,000
8	(United States) Justin Leonard	111,638	600,000
9	(United States) Ben Curtis	110,702	550,000
10	(South Korea) K. J. Choi	110,646	500,000

== Money list ==
The money list was based on prize money won during the season, calculated in U.S. dollars.

Position	Player	Prize money ($)
1	(Fiji) Vijay Singh	6,601,094
2	(United States) Tiger Woods	5,775,000
3	(United States) Phil Mickelson	5,118,875
4	(Spain) Sergio García	4,858,224
5	(United States) Kenny Perry	4,663,794
6	(United States) Anthony Kim	4,656,265
7	(Colombia) Camilo Villegas	4,422,641
8	(Republic of Ireland) Pádraig Harrington	4,313,551
9	(United States) Stewart Cink	3,979,301
10	(United States) Justin Leonard	3,943,542

== Awards ==
Award	Winner	Ref.
PGA Tour Player of the Year (Jack Nicklaus Trophy)	(Republic of Ireland) Pádraig Harrington	
PGA Player of the Year	(Republic of Ireland) Pádraig Harrington	
Rookie of the Year	(Argentina) Andrés Romero	
Scoring leader (PGA Tour – Byron Nelson Award)	(Spain) Sergio García	
Scoring leader (PGA – Vardon Trophy)	(Spain) Sergio García	
Comeback Player of the Year	(United States) Dudley Hart	

== See also ==
- 2008 in golf
- 2008 Champions Tour
- 2008 Nationwide Tour
