= Kiwi Challenge =

Golf tournament in New Zealand

The Kiwi Challenge was a golf tournament played as part of the PGA Tour's Challenge Season. It was played in New Zealand.

The 36-hole tournament began in 2008 with a four-man field of Anthony Kim, Hunter Mahan, Adam Scott and Brandt Snedeker. It aired in December on NBC and was played on the courses Kauri Cliffs and Cape Kidnappers over two days. The purse was $2.6 million with $1.5 million going to the winner (second: $500,000, third: $350,000, fourth: $250,000). The 2008 event was won by Hunter Mahan.

The 2009 event was played November 10–11 and aired on November 14–15 on NBC. The field was Anthony Kim, Hunter Mahan, Sean O'Hair, and Camilo Villegas. It was played at Cape Kidnappers with a purse of $2.0 million (first: $1,000,000, second: $500,000, third: $300,000, fourth: $200,000). Anthony Kim won in a playoff over Sean O'Hair.

The tournament was discontinued after 2009.

== Winners ==
Year	Winner	Runner-up	Third	Fourth
2009	(United States) Anthony Kim	(United States) Sean O'Hair	(United States) Hunter Mahan	(Colombia) Camilo Villegas
2008	(United States) Hunter Mahan	(United States) Anthony Kim	(United States) Brandt Snedeker	(Australia) Adam Scott
