= St. Jude Championship =

Golf playoff tournament held in Memphis, Tennessee, US

Coordinates: 35.057°N 89.779°W

FedEx St. Jude Championship
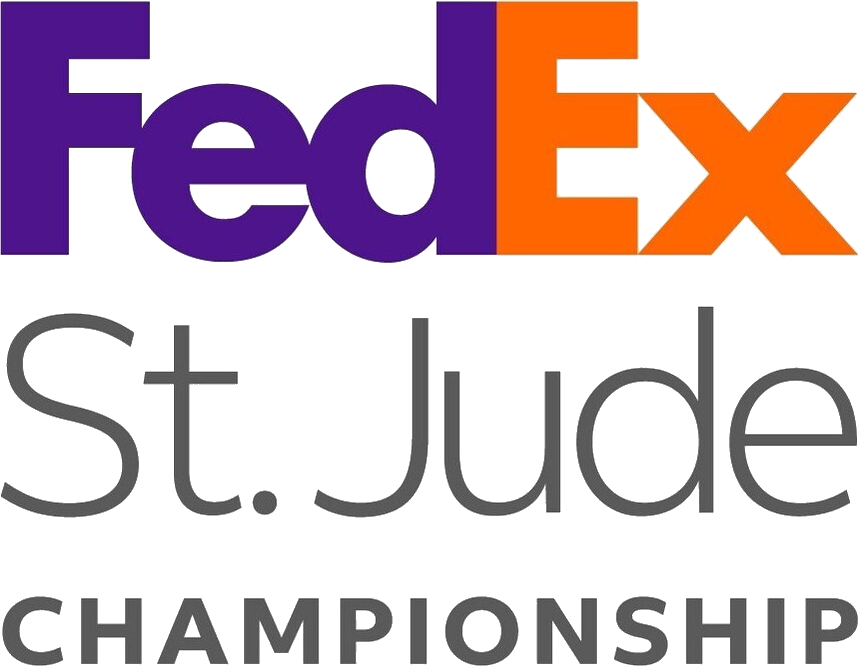

Tournament information
- Location: Memphis, Tennessee
- Established: 1967
- Course: TPC Southwind
- Par: 70
- Length: 7,288 yards (6,664 m)
- Tour: PGA Tour
- Format: Stroke play
- Prize fund: US$20,000,000
- Month played: August
- Website: fedexchampionship.com

Tournament record score
- Aggregate: 254 Dustin Johnson (2020)
- To par: −30 as above

Current champion
- (United States) Scottie Scheffler

Location map
- Location in the United States Location in Tennessee

The FedEx St. Jude Championship, founded as the Westchester Classic in 1967, is a professional golf tournament on the PGA Tour. The Championship has a partnership with St. Jude Children's Research Hospital, with the hospital serving as the tournament's designated charity since 1970. Since 2007, it has been played as the first tournament of the playoff system for the FedEx Cup, with the field limited to the top 70 players on the FedEx Cup points list at the end of the regular season; prior to 2023, the top 125 players were included. For sponsorship reasons, the tournament has previously been titled The Northern Trust, The Barclays, and the Buick Classic.

The Westchester Classic was hosted at Westchester Country Club in Harrison, New York until 2007, after which it moved around several courses in New York and New Jersey. In 2018, the PGA Tour announced that The Northern Trust, as it was then known, would alternate between the New York/New Jersey and Boston areas from 2019, and in 2020 it was held at TPC Boston. For the 2021–22 season, the tournament was renamed the FedEx St. Jude Championship and relocated to Memphis, Tennessee, where both St. Jude Children’s Research Hospital and title sponsor FedEx have their headquarters.

Many of the world's top players have won the event including Justin Rose, Sergio García, Adam Scott, Jason Day, Matt Kuchar, Patrick Reed, Dustin Johnson, and Bryson DeChambeau, who captured a four-stroke victory in 2018 and became the tournament's youngest winner in the FedEx Cup era. Since the tournament's inception in 1967, The Northern Trust has generated nearly $50 million for New York/New Jersey Metropolitan-area charities, including a record $1.865 million in 2018.

== History ==
The event can trace its origins back to a Westchester-based pro-am tournament that began at The Apawamis Club in Rye, New York. Founded by William Mitchell "Bill" Jennings, the popular spectator event drew many top players before leaving Apawamis after 1961 when it was merged into the Thunderbird Classic. It was next played at the Upper Montclair Country Club in Clifton, New Jersey (1962, 1966–68) and the neighboring Westchester Country Club (1963–65) also in Rye. Proceeds from the popular event benefited the now defunct United Hospital in Port Chester, New York for many years. Beginning in 1976, the tournament underwent a series of name sponsorships (detailed below), not unlike other PGA Tour stops. The name of the event evolved to the point that, by 1990, it no longer contained the name of its host course or location. However, among golfers on tour and many fans, it was still known by its traditional name, the Westchester Classic.

The tournament was usually played during June of each year, either the week before (in even-numbered years) or the week after (in odd-numbered years) the U.S. Open. It had its greatest attendance in 2001 when Tiger Woods participated, although two days of heavy rains disrupted play. It had one of its more exciting finishes in 2005, when Pádraig Harrington eagled the par-5 final hole with a 65-foot (20 m) putt to win the title. The most frequent winner of the tournament is Vijay Singh, with four trophies.

Beginning in 2008, it left the Westchester Country Club and began being rotated amongst different clubs in the New York metropolitan area (also detailed below).

In 2011, Hurricane Irene shortened the tournament to 54 holes, which was played that year at the Plainfield Country Club in Edison, New Jersey. The tournament ended by noontime on Saturday, August 27, allowing ample time for players and spectators to evacuate the golf course.

The tournament has traditionally closed CBS Sports's PGA Tour television schedule, due to the network's commitment to airing American football during the fall months; until 2014, the network also had rights to the U.S. Open tennis tournament, which begins the Monday prior to Labor Day. (The 2019 changes to the PGA Tour calendar, which resulted in The Northern Trust being moved up two weeks due to the PGA Tour's desire to complete the FedEx Cup Playoffs by the end of August, will not affect this tournament ending CBS's golf season, even though the tournament now takes place three weeks before the first week of the college football season.) Jim Nantz, who calls the final two rounds of The Northern Trust on television, is also the lead play-by-play announcer for the NFL on CBS. However, a 2023 change gives both CBS and NBC the entirety of the FedEx Cup playoffs – 2022 NBC, 2023 CBS, 2024 and 2025 NBC, 2026 CBS).

In 2017, Chicago-based financial services company Northern Trust replaced Barclays, which had sponsored the tournament since 2005. Northern Trust had previously been the title sponsor of the Los Angeles Open at Riviera for nine years, known as the "Northern Trust Open" from 2008 through 2016.

In 2019, the FedEx Cup Playoffs featured three events, instead of four, and the Playoffs concluded by the end of August. As a result, The Northern Trust was played earlier in August (August 5–11, 2019), followed by the BMW Championship, August 12–18 (70 players); and the Tour Championship August 19–25 (30 players).

== Highlights ==
In 2015, Brian Harman became only the third player in PGA Tour history to record two holes-in-one in the same round.

In 2020, Scottie Scheffler shot a 12-under-par 59 at TPC Boston in the second round.

== Course ==
Hole	Yards	Par	Hole	Yards	Par
1	434	4	10	465	4
2	408	4	11	168	3
3	579	5	12	406	4
4	196	3	13	472	4
5	529	4	14	205	3
6	433	4	15	395	4
7	482	4	16	530	5
8	171	3	17	505	4
9	457	4	18	453	4
Out	3,689	35	In	3,599	35
Source:			Total	7,288	70

- The approximate average elevation is 350 feet (105 m) above sea level.

== Winners ==
PGA Tour (FedEx Cup Playoffs)	2007–
PGA Tour (Regular)	1967–2006

#	Year	Winner	Score	To par	Margin of victory	Runner(s)-up	Purse (US$)	Winner's share ($)	Venue
FedEx St. Jude Championship
60th	2026	(United States) Scottie Scheffler	263	−17	8 strokes	(South Korea) Kim Si-woo	20,000,000	3,600,000	TPC Southwind, TN
59th	2025	(England) Justin Rose	264	−16	Playoff	(United States) J. J. Spaun	20,000,000	3,600,000	TPC Southwind, TN
58th	2024	(Japan) Hideki Matsuyama	263	−17	2 strokes	(Norway) Viktor Hovland (United States) Xander Schauffele	20,000,000	3,600,000	TPC Southwind, TN
57th	2023	(United States) Lucas Glover	265	−15	Playoff	(United States) Patrick Cantlay	20,000,000	3,600,000	TPC Southwind, TN
56th	2022	(United States) Will Zalatoris	265	−15	Playoff	(Austria) Sepp Straka	15,000,000	2,700,000	TPC Southwind, TN
The Northern Trust
55th	2021	(United States) Tony Finau	264	−20	Playoff	(Australia) Cameron Smith	9,500,000	1,710,000	Liberty National, NJ
54th	2020	(United States) Dustin Johnson (3)	254	−30	11 strokes	(United States) Harris English	9,500,000	1,710,000	TPC Boston, MA
53rd	2019	(United States) Patrick Reed (2)	268	−16	1 stroke	(Mexico) Abraham Ancer	9,250,000	1,665,000	Liberty National, NJ
52nd	2018	(United States) Bryson DeChambeau	266	−18	4 strokes	(United States) Tony Finau	9,000,000	1,620,000	Ridgewood, NJ
51st	2017	(United States) Dustin Johnson (2)	267	−13	Playoff	(United States) Jordan Spieth	8,750,000	1,575,000	Glen Oaks, NY
The Barclays
50th	2016	(United States) Patrick Reed	275	−9	1 stroke	(Argentina) Emiliano Grillo (United States) Sean O'Hair	8,500,000	1,530,000	Bethpage Black, NY
49th	2015	(Australia) Jason Day	261	−19	6 strokes	(Sweden) Henrik Stenson	8,250,000	1,485,000	Plainfield, NJ
48th	2014	(United States) Hunter Mahan	270	−14	2 strokes	(Australia) Stuart Appleby (Australia) Jason Day (United States) Cameron Tringale	8,000,000	1,440,000	Ridgewood, NJ
47th	2013	(Australia) Adam Scott	273	−11	1 stroke	(Canada) Graham DeLaet (England) Justin Rose (United States) Gary Woodland (United States) Tiger Woods	8,000,000	1,440,000	Liberty National, NJ
46th	2012	(United States) Nick Watney	274	−10	3 strokes	(United States) Brandt Snedeker	8,000,000	1,440,000	Bethpage Black, NY
45th	2011	(United States) Dustin Johnson	194 (Note: Shortened to 54 holes due to weather.)	−19	2 strokes	(United States) Matt Kuchar	8,000,000	1,440,000	Plainfield, NJ
44th	2010	(United States) Matt Kuchar	272	−12	Playoff	(Scotland) Martin Laird	7,500,000	1,350,000	Ridgewood, NJ
43rd	2009	(United States) Heath Slocum	275	−9	1 stroke	(South Africa) Ernie Els (Republic of Ireland) Pádraig Harrington (United States) Steve Stricker (United States) Tiger Woods	7,500,000	1,350,000	Liberty National, NJ
42nd	2008	(Fiji) Vijay Singh (4)	276	−8	Playoff	(Spain) Sergio García (United States) Kevin Sutherland	7,000,000	1,260,000	Ridgewood, NJ
41st	2007	(United States) Steve Stricker	268	−16	2 strokes	(South Korea) K. J. Choi	7,000,000	1,260,000	Westchester, NY
Barclays Classic
40th	2006	(Fiji) Vijay Singh (3)	274	−10	2 strokes	(Australia) Adam Scott	5,750,000	1,035,000	Westchester, NY
39th	2005	(Republic of Ireland) Pádraig Harrington	274	−10	1 stroke	(United States) Jim Furyk	5,750,000	1,035,000	Westchester, NY
Buick Classic
38th	2004	(Spain) Sergio García (2)	272	−12	Playoff	(Republic of Ireland) Pádraig Harrington (South Africa) Rory Sabbatini	5,250,000	945,000	Westchester, NY
37th	2003	(United States) Jonathan Kaye	271	−13	Playoff	(United States) John Rollins	5,000,000	900,000	Westchester, NY
36th	2002	(United States) Chris Smith	272	−12	2 strokes	(United States) David Gossett (United States) Pat Perez (United States) Loren Roberts	3,500,000	630,000	Westchester, NY
35th	2001	(Spain) Sergio García	268	−16	3 strokes	(United States) Scott Hoch	3,500,000	630,000	Westchester, NY
34th	2000	(United States) Dennis Paulson	276	−8	Playoff	(United States) David Duval	3,000,000	540,000	Westchester, NY
33rd	1999	(United States) Duffy Waldorf	276	−8	Playoff	(United States) Dennis Paulson	2,500,000	450,000	Westchester, NY
32nd	1998	(United States) J. P. Hayes	201	−12	Playoff	(United States) Jim Furyk	1,800,000	324,000	Westchester, NY
31st	1997	(South Africa) Ernie Els (2)	268	−16	2 strokes	(United States) Jeff Maggert	1,500,000	270,000	Westchester, NY
30th	1996	(South Africa) Ernie Els	271	−13	8 strokes	(Australia) Steve Elkington (United States) Tom Lehman (United States) Jeff Maggert (Australia) Craig Parry	1,200,000	216,000	Westchester, NY
29th	1995	(Fiji) Vijay Singh (2)	278	−6	Playoff	(United States) Doug Martin	1,200,000	216,000	Westchester, NY
28th	1994	(United States) Lee Janzen	268	−16	3 strokes	(South Africa) Ernie Els	1,200,000	216,000	Westchester, NY
27th	1993	(Fiji) Vijay Singh	280	−4	Playoff	(United States) Mark Wiebe	1,000,000	180,000	Westchester, NY
26th	1992	(South Africa) David Frost	268	−16	8 strokes	(United States) Duffy Waldorf	1,000,000	180,000	Westchester, NY
25th	1991	(United States) Billy Andrade	273	−11	2 strokes	(United States) Brad Bryant	1,000,000	180,000	Westchester, NY
24th	1990	(United States) Hale Irwin	269	−15	2 strokes	(United States) Paul Azinger	1,000,000	180,000	Westchester, NY
Manufacturers Hanover Westchester Classic
23rd	1989	(Australia) Wayne Grady	277	−7	Playoff	(United States) Ronnie Black	1,000,000	180,000	Westchester, NY
22rd	1988	(Spain) Seve Ballesteros (2)	276	−8	Playoff	(South Africa) David Frost (United States) Ken Green (Australia) Greg Norman	700,000	126,000	Westchester, NY
21st	1987	(United States) J. C. Snead	276	−8	Playoff	(Spain) Seve Ballesteros	600,000	108,000	Westchester, NY
20th	1986	(United States) Bob Tway	272	−12	1 stroke	(United States) Willie Wood	600,000	108,000	Westchester, NY
19th	1985	(United States) Roger Maltbie	275	−9	Playoff	(United States) George Burns (United States) Raymond Floyd	500,000	90,000	Westchester, NY
18th	1984	(United States) Scott Simpson	269	−15	5 strokes	(Australia) David Graham (United States) Jay Haas (United States) Mark O'Meara	500,000	90,000	Westchester, NY
17th	1983	(Spain) Seve Ballesteros	276	−8	2 strokes	(United States) Andy Bean (United States) Craig Stadler	450,000	81,000	Westchester, NY
16th	1982	(United States) Bob Gilder	261	−19	5 strokes	(United States) Peter Jacobsen (United States) Tom Kite	400,000	72,000	Westchester, NY
15th	1981	(United States) Raymond Floyd	275	−9	1 stroke	(United States) Bobby Clampett (United States) Gibby Gilbert (United States) Craig Stadler	400,000	72,000	Westchester, NY
14th	1980	(United States) Curtis Strange	273	−11	2 strokes	(United States) Gibby Gilbert	400,000	72,000	Westchester, NY
13th	1979	(United States) Jack Renner	277	−7	1 stroke	(Australia) David Graham (United States) Howard Twitty	400,000	72,000	Westchester, NY
American Express Westchester Classic
12th	1978	(United States) Lee Elder	274	−10	1 stroke	(United States) Mark Hayes	300,000	60,000	Westchester, NY
11th	1977	(United States) Andy North	272	−12	2 strokes	(United States) George Archer	300,000	60,000	Westchester, NY
10th	1976	(Australia) David Graham	272	−12	3 strokes	(United States) Ben Crenshaw (United States) Tom Watson (United States) Fuzzy Zoeller	300,000	60,000	Westchester, NY
Westchester Classic
9th	1975	(United States) Gene Littler	271	−17	Playoff	(United States) Julius Boros	250,000	50,000	Westchester, NY
8th	1974	(United States) Johnny Miller	269	−19	2 strokes	(United States) Don Bies	250,000	50,000	Westchester, NY
7th	1973	(United States) Bobby Nichols	272	−16	Playoff	(United States) Bob Murphy	250,000	50,000	Westchester, NY
6th	1972	(United States) Jack Nicklaus (2)	270	−18	3 strokes	(United States) Jim Colbert	250,000	50,000	Westchester, NY
5th	1971	(United States) Arnold Palmer	270	−18	5 strokes	(United States) Gibby Gilbert (United States) Hale Irwin	250,000	50,000	Westchester, NY
4th	1970	(Australia) Bruce Crampton	273	−15	1 stroke	(United States) Larry Hinson (United States) Jack Nicklaus	250,000	50,000	Westchester, NY
3rd	1969	(United States) Frank Beard	275	−13	1 stroke	(United States) Bert Greene	250,000	50,000	Westchester, NY
2nd	1968	(United States) Julius Boros	272	−16	1 stroke	(United States) Bob Murphy (United States) Jack Nicklaus (United States) Dan Sikes	250,000	50,000	Westchester, NY
1st	1967	(United States) Jack Nicklaus	272	−16	1 stroke	(United States) Dan Sikes	250,000	50,000	Westchester, NY

Note: Green highlight indicates scoring records.
