= Camilo Villegas =

Colombian professional golfer (born 1982)

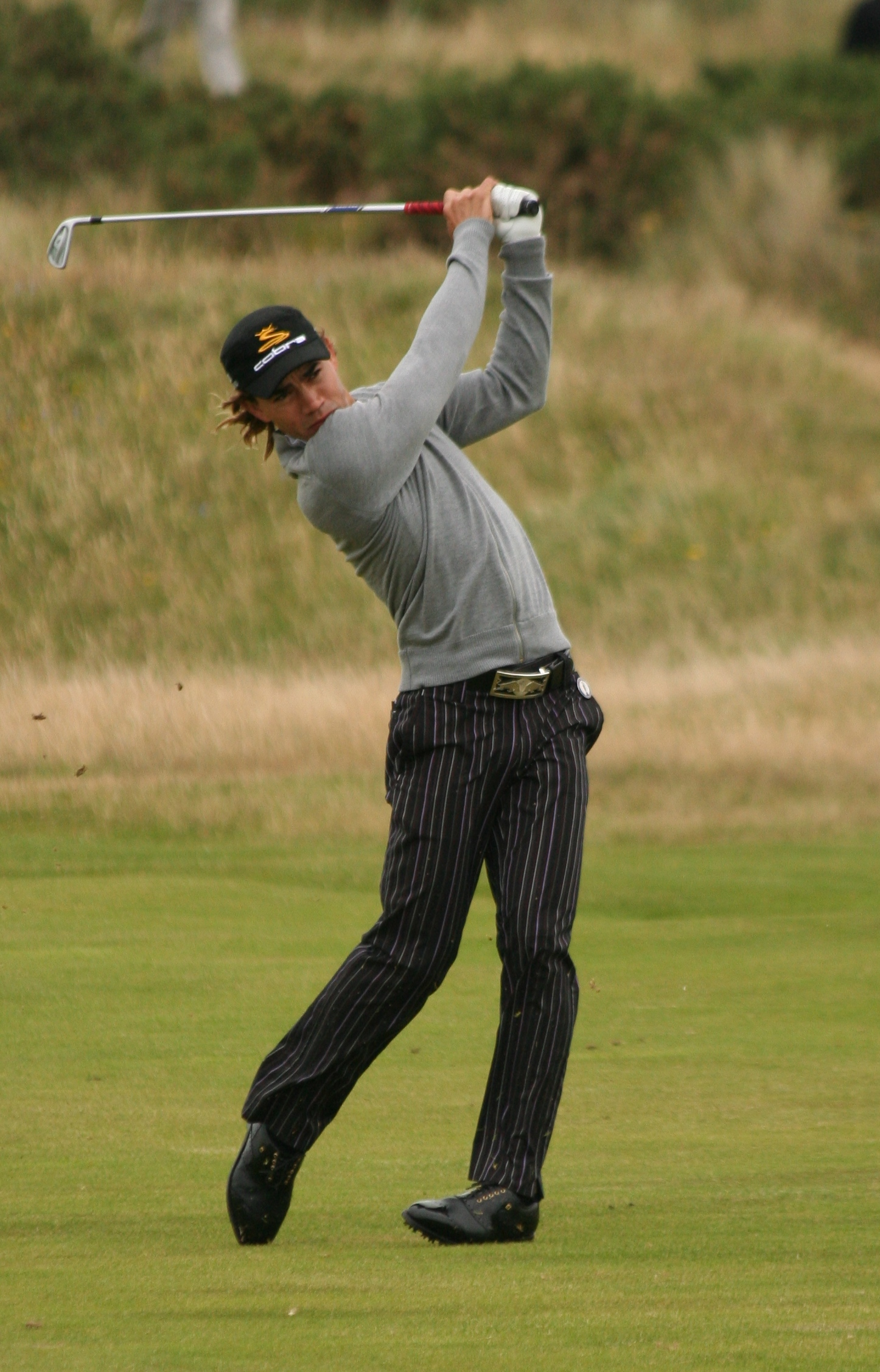

Personal information
- Full name: Camilo Villegas Restrepo
- Nickname: Spider-Man
- Nationality: Colombia
- Born: 7 January 1982 (age 44) Medellín, Colombia
- Height: 5 ft 9 in (175 cm)
- Weight: 160 lb (73 kg)

Career
- Sport: Golf
- Partner: Maria Ochoa Mora
- College: University of Florida
- Turned professional: 2004
- Current tour: PGA Tour
- Former tours: European Tour; PGA Tour of Australasia; Korn Ferry Tour; NGA Hooters Tour
- Professional wins: 12
- Highest ranking: 7 (28 September 2008)

Number of wins by tour
- PGA Tour: 5
- Japan Golf Tour: 1
- Other: 6

Best results in major championships
- Masters Tournament: T13: 2009
- PGA Championship: T4: 2008
- U.S. Open: T9: 2008
- The Open Championship: T13: 2009

Camilo Villegas Restrepo (Spanish pronunciation: [kaˈmilo βiˈʎeɣas]; born 7 January 1982) is a Colombian professional golfer who plays on the PGA Tour.

== Early life ==
Villegas was born in Medellín, Colombia, and took up golf as a child. After several different National Junior Championships in Colombia between the ages of 8 and 15, at 16 he became the first player in Colombian golf history to win the Amateur's Grand Slam in the same year: The National Junior Championship (stroke play), the National Junior Championship (match play), the National Amateur Championship, and the Colombian Open in the amateur category. Then, in 2001, he became only the second player to win the Colombian Open as an amateur. His success in Colombian golf throughout the 1990s earned him the distinction of "Player of the Decade" issued by the Colombian Golf Federation.

== Amateur career ==
Villegas accepted an athletic scholarship to attend the University of Florida in Gainesville, Florida, where he played for head coach Buddy Alexander's Florida Gators men's golf team in National Collegiate Athletic Association (NCAA) competition from 2001 to 2004. As a freshman in 2001, Villegas was a member of the Gators' 2001 NCAA championship team. During his college golf career, he was the Southeastern Conference (SEC) Freshman of the Year in 2001, the SEC Player of the Year in 2002 and 2004, and an All-American four consecutive years (2001, 2002, 2003, 2004). Villegas graduated from the University of Florida with a bachelor's degree in business administration in 2004.

Villegas is known for his commitment to physical fitness, and says his mentor and inspiration is golf icon Gary Player. Villegas and Player have starred together in a MasterCard "priceless" commercial. In the June 2006 issue of Golf Digest, Villegas was named "the sexiest player on tour, Tiger Woods included." He has also gained notoriety for sporting flashy dress clothing by designer J. Lindeberg. An alumnus of the University of Florida, Villegas frequently visits the university's Mark Bostick Golf Course when he is spending time at his residence in Gainesville, Florida. His younger brother, Manuel, also played on the University of Florida team and now plays on the Korn Ferry Tour.

== Professional career ==
Villegas began playing on the PGA Tour in 2004 and earned his PGA Tour card just prior to the 2006 season. He had a blistering start to his 2006 rookie year on tour, with two second-place finishes and a third place (at The Players Championship) in his first nine events. He barely missed qualifying into the 2006 Masters Tournament in his rookie year, being just a single position on the PGA Tour money list (11th) under the requirement. He made his first Masters appearance in 2007 by finishing in the top 40 of the PGA Tour money list for 2006. He qualified for the 2008 Masters through his play during the inaugural FedEx Cup playoff system, that included an opening round 63 (8 under par) at the Deutsche Bank Championship, and three straight top 10 finishes. He entered the FedEx Cup playoffs in 52nd place and improved to 28th place through his play in the first three events, thus qualifying for the 30-man field at The Tour Championship in Atlanta, Georgia, where he finished in the top 10 for the third straight week and finished 24th on the FedEx Cup points list.

Villegas won his second professional event at the Coca-Cola Tokai Classic on the Japan Golf Tour in September 2007. By doing so, he earned ¥24,000,000 (approximately US$208,272). He shot a score of 282 (−2) and defeated Toyokazu Fujishima in a playoff by draining a 20-foot putt on the winning hole. Villegas won his third professional event at the Telus World Skins Game in June 2008 where he defeated a field that included Greg Norman, Colin Montgomerie, Mike Weir and "Mr. Skins", Fred Couples. Villegas took six skins for $130,000 with a short birdie putt on the 14th hole, and then won an additional four skins for $100,000 in a playoff, which was decided with a closest-to-the-pin shootout from 130 yards out on the 18th hole.

Villegas recorded a record-breaking second round in the 2008 Open Championship. He shot 65, which was the lowest score for any Open Championship second round at Royal Birkdale. He started off with two bogeys but ended with five consecutive birdies which put him at 5 under for his round. Villegas won his first PGA Tour title in September 2008, winning the BMW Championship by two shots over Dudley Hart. For the last 44 holes of the tournament, Villegas did not three putt, one-putting 27 of those last 44 holes. This victory took him to a career high of 18th in the Official World Golf Ranking.

Villegas followed his BMW Championship win with a victory in the Tour Championship. He defeated Sergio García in a playoff, having trailed by five shots going into the final round. The win took Villegas to a career-high 7th place in the Official World Golf Rankings and established him as the highest ranked golfer from South America. He finished the season 7th on the PGA Tour money list.

In late 2008, Villegas joined the European Tour, making his first European Tour appearance at the 2008 HSBC Champions, the first tournament of the 2009 season. However he continued to play predominately in the United States. He had no victories in 2009, but had five top-10 finishes and ended the season ranked 45th on the PGA Tour money list and in the top 30 of the European Tour's Race to Dubai.

He has spent over 30 weeks in the top-10 of the Official World Golf Rankings since 2008, with a career high rank of seventh. At the 2009 Chevron World Challenge, Villegas made a very rare albatross (double eagle) on a 568-yard par 5, firing a 262-yard second shot into the hole.

In March 2010, Villegas earned his third victory on the PGA Tour, winning The Honda Classic by five strokes over Anthony Kim. He chose not to maintain his status on the European Tour, and a slump in form in 2012 meant he had to enter the PGA Tour's Qualifying school at the end of the season; he finished 144th on the money list. Villegas did not regain a Tour Card, but had conditional status on the PGA Tour for 2013, playing in the 126-150 category. His status gave him entry based on sponsor exemptions, past championships, and priority ranking. He regained full privileges for 2014 with a 110th-place finish in the FedEx Cup. In 2014, Villegas won the Wyndham Championship, his first win on Tour in more than four years. The win moved him into the 37th position of the 2014 FedEX Cup prior to going into the FedEx Cup playoffs. With this victory, Villegas earned an invitation for the 2015 Masters Tournament, and a two-year exemption on the PGA Tour, lasting until the 2015–16 season.

In July 2016, Villegas withdrew from the Olympics in Rio to concentrate in the PGA Tour and secure a card for the 2016–17 season. He also mentioned concerns over the Zika virus as another reason to pull out from the Olympics. Villegas did not regain his Tour card and played the 2016–17 season with only past champion status. He eventually played well enough to regain his PGA Tour privileges for the 2017–18 season.

In November 2023, Villegas won his fifth PGA Tour event and first since 2014 at the Butterfield Bermuda Championship. Villegas started the FedEx Fall season 223rd in the rankings. A T2 at the World Wide Technology Championship moved him to 147th, with the win at Bermuda moving him to 75th in the final standings. The win also helped Villegas qualify for the 2024 Olympics.

== Pronouncing his name ==
Throughout the PGA Tour and among the media, there is a debate over how Villegas's name should be pronounced.

- In Spanish, Villegas is pronounced "bee-YAY-gahss" or "bee-JAY-gahss." The official language in Colombia is Spanish. For more on the ambiguity of this pronunciation, see Yeísmo.
- Recent examples from discussion forums, television coverage and sports articles—including interviews with Villegas himself—have supported the standard pronunciation of "bee-JAY-gahss" for his last name, although there are some who have not yet adopted the proper first name pronunciation, "kah-MEE-lo."

== Personal life ==
Villegas is often compared with Spider-Man for his unique style of reading greens before he putts. He leans himself all the way to the putting surface, stretching out his left leg while balancing himself on his right leg, getting his chest and head almost to the ground, from which he reads his putts.

On 26 July 2020, Villegas' 22-month-old daughter Mía died after battling tumours on her brain and spine. Following her death, the PGA Tour paid tribute to her in the following tournaments, including the PGA Championship, and the Wyndham Championship, by giving players small rainbow pins for their caps, as Camilo revealed Mia's immense love for rainbows. Many players continued wearing the pins in their caps for the rest of the season, and Villegas received tremendous support within the PGA community, the sporting world, and his fans in Colombia.

Despite the tragedy, Villegas said in a heartfelt interview that he would try to reconnect himself with the game of golf, and return to form, stating that "despite not being able to change what has happened, we will try to seek the future, with the memory of Mia by our side". A month after her death, Villegas made a return to competitive golf; making starts in Korn Ferry Tour tournaments, to the acclaim of his fellow competitors.

== Amateur wins ==
- 2002 Mexican Open
- 2003 Players Amateur

== Professional wins (12) ==
=== PGA Tour wins (5) ===
Legend
FedEx Cup playoff events (2)
Other PGA Tour (3)

No.	Date	Tournament	Winning score	Margin of victory	Runner(s)-up
1	7 Sep 2008	BMW Championship	−15 (65-66-66-68=265)	2 strokes	(United States) Dudley Hart
2	28 Sep 2008	The Tour Championship	−7 (72-66-69-66=273)	Playoff	(Spain) Sergio García
3	7 Mar 2010	The Honda Classic	−13 (66-66-67-68=267)	5 strokes	(United States) Anthony Kim
4	17 Aug 2014	Wyndham Championship	−17 (63-69-68-63=263)	1 stroke	(United States) Bill Haas, (Sweden) Freddie Jacobson
5	12 Nov 2023	Butterfield Bermuda Championship	−24 (67-63-65-65=260)	2 strokes	(Sweden) Alex Norén

PGA Tour playoff record (1–2)

No.	Year	Tournament	Opponent(s)	Result
1	2007	The Honda Classic	(Argentina) José Cóceres, (United States) Boo Weekley, (United States) Mark Wilson	Wilson won with birdie on third extra hole Villegas and Weekley eliminated by par on second hole
2	2008	Tour Championship	(Spain) Sergio García	Won with par on first extra hole
3	2016	RSM Classic	(United States) Blayne Barber, (United States) Billy Horschel, (Canada) Mackenzie Hughes, (Sweden) Henrik Norlander	Hughes won with par on third extra hole Horschel eliminated by par on first hole

=== Japan Golf Tour wins (1) ===
No.	Date	Tournament	Winning score	Margin of victory	Runner-up
1	30 Sep 2007	Coca-Cola Tokai Classic	−2 (68-72-71-71=282)	Playoff	(Japan) Toyokazu Fujishima

Japan Golf Tour playoff record (1–0)

No.	Year	Tournament	Opponent	Result
1	2007	Coca-Cola Tokai Classic	(Japan) Toyokazu Fujishima	Won with birdie on second extra hole

=== South American wins (1) ===
- 2001 Colombian Open (as an amateur)

=== NGA Hooters Tour wins (1) ===
No.	Date	Tournament	Winning score	Margin of victory	Runner-up
1	May 1, 2005	Savannah Lakes Resort Classic	−21 (67-66-69-65=267)	4 strokes	(United States) Matthew Anderson

=== Other wins (4) ===
No.	Date	Tournament	Winning score	Margin of victory	Runner(s)-up
1	17 Jun 2008	Telus World Skins Game	$230,000	$130,000	(Australia) Greg Norman
2	24 Jun 2008	CVS Caremark Charity Classic (with (United States) Bubba Watson)	−15 (61-34=95)*	Playoff	(United States) Billy Andrade and (United States) Davis Love III, (United States) Paul Goydos and (United States) Tim Herron, (United States) Rocco Mediate and (United States) Brandt Snedeker
3	26 Aug 2008	Notah Begay III Foundation Challenge	$220,000	$40,000	(Fiji) Vijay Singh
4	8 Nov 2010	World Golf Salutes King Bhumibol Skins Tournament	$109,800	$17,800	(England) Paul Casey

*Note: The 2008 CVS Caremark Charity Classic was stopped after 28 holes due to heavy rain.

Other playoff record (1–0)

No.	Year	Tournament	Opponents	Result
1	2008	CVS Caremark Charity Classic (with (United States) Bubba Watson)	(United States) Billy Andrade and (United States) Davis Love III, (United States) Paul Goydos and (United States) Tim Herron, (United States) Rocco Mediate and (United States) Brandt Snedeker	Won by 1 stroke in three-hole aggregate playoff

== Results in major championships ==
Results not in chronological order in 2020.

Tournament	2004	2005	2006	2007	2008	2009	2010	2011	2012	2013	2014	2015	2016	2017	2018
Masters Tournament				CUT	CUT	T13	T38	49				CUT			
U.S. Open	CUT		T59	T26	T9	T33	T70	CUT				74			
The Open Championship					T39	T13	T44	CUT		CUT					
PGA Championship			CUT	T23	T4	T51	T8	CUT				CUT			

Tournament	2019	2020	2021	2022	2023	2024
Masters Tournament						T35
PGA Championship						CUT
U.S. Open						
The Open Championship		NT				

Top 10
Did not play

CUT = missed the half-way cut
"T" = tied
NT = No tournament due to the COVID-19 pandemic

=== Summary ===
Tournament	Wins	2nd	3rd	Top-5	Top-10	Top-25	Events	Cuts made
Masters Tournament	0	0	0	0	0	1	7	4
U.S. Open	0	0	0	0	1	1	8	6
The Open Championship	0	0	0	0	0	1	5	3
PGA Championship	0	0	0	1	2	3	8	4
Totals	0	0	0	1	3	6	28	17

- Most consecutive cuts made – 12 (2008 U.S. Open – 2011 Masters)
- Longest streak of top-10s – 1 (three times)

== Results in The Players Championship ==
Tournament	2006	2007	2008	2009
The Players Championship	T3	CUT	T66	T14

Tournament	2010	2011	2012	2013	2014	2015	2016	2017	2018	2019
The Players Championship	CUT	CUT	CUT		CUT	CUT	70			

Tournament	2020	2021	2022	2023	2024	2025
The Players Championship	C				CUT	T54

Top 10
Did not play

CUT = missed the halfway cut
"T" indicates a tie for a place
C = Canceled after the first round due to the COVID-19 pandemic

== Results in World Golf Championships ==
Results not in chronological order before 2015.

Tournament	2008	2009	2010	2011	2012	2013	2014	2015
Championship	T26	T5	T16	T35				
Match Play	R64	R16	3	R64				
Invitational		T36	T71					T25
Champions			T51					

Top 10
Did not play

QF, R16, R32, R64 = Round in which player lost in match play
"T" = tied
Note that the HSBC Champions did not become a WGC event until 2009.

== Team appearances ==
Amateur

- Eisenhower Trophy (representing Colombia): 1998, 2000, 2002

Professional

- World Cup (representing Colombia): 2006, 2011
- Wendy's 3-Tour Challenge (representing PGA Tour): 2007
- Presidents Cup (International team): 2009

== See also ==
- 2005 Nationwide Tour graduates
- List of Florida Gators men's golfers on the PGA Tour
- List of University of Florida alumni
