= Toyokazu Fujishima =

Japanese professional golfer

Personal information
- Nationality: Japan
- Born: 8 July 1981 (age 45) Kumamoto Prefecture, Japan
- Height: 1.67 m (5 ft 6 in)
- Weight: 70 kg (150 lb; 11 st)

Career
- Sport: Golf
- Status: Professional
- Current tour: Japan Golf Tour
- Professional wins: 1

Number of wins by tour
- Japan Golf Tour: 1
Medal record
Asian Games
Bronze medal – third place	2002 Busan	Men's team

Toyokazu Fujishima (born 8 July 1981) is a Japanese professional golfer.

== Career ==
Fujishima plays on the Japan Golf Tour, where he has won once.

== Professional wins (1) ==
=== Japan Golf Tour wins (1) ===
No.	Date	Tournament	Winning score	Margin of victory	Runner-up
1	7 Sep 2008	Fujisankei Classic	−13 (64-68-71-68=271)	Playoff	(Japan) Hiroshi Iwata

Japan Golf Tour playoff record (1–1)

No.	Year	Tournament	Opponent	Result
1	2007	Coca-Cola Tokai Classic	(Colombia) Camilo Villegas	Lost to birdie on second extra hole
2	2008	Fujisankei Classic	(Japan) Hiroshi Iwata	Won with par on first extra hole

== Team appearances ==
Amateur

- Eisenhower Trophy (representing Japan): 2002
