= Anthony Kim =

American professional golfer (born 1985)

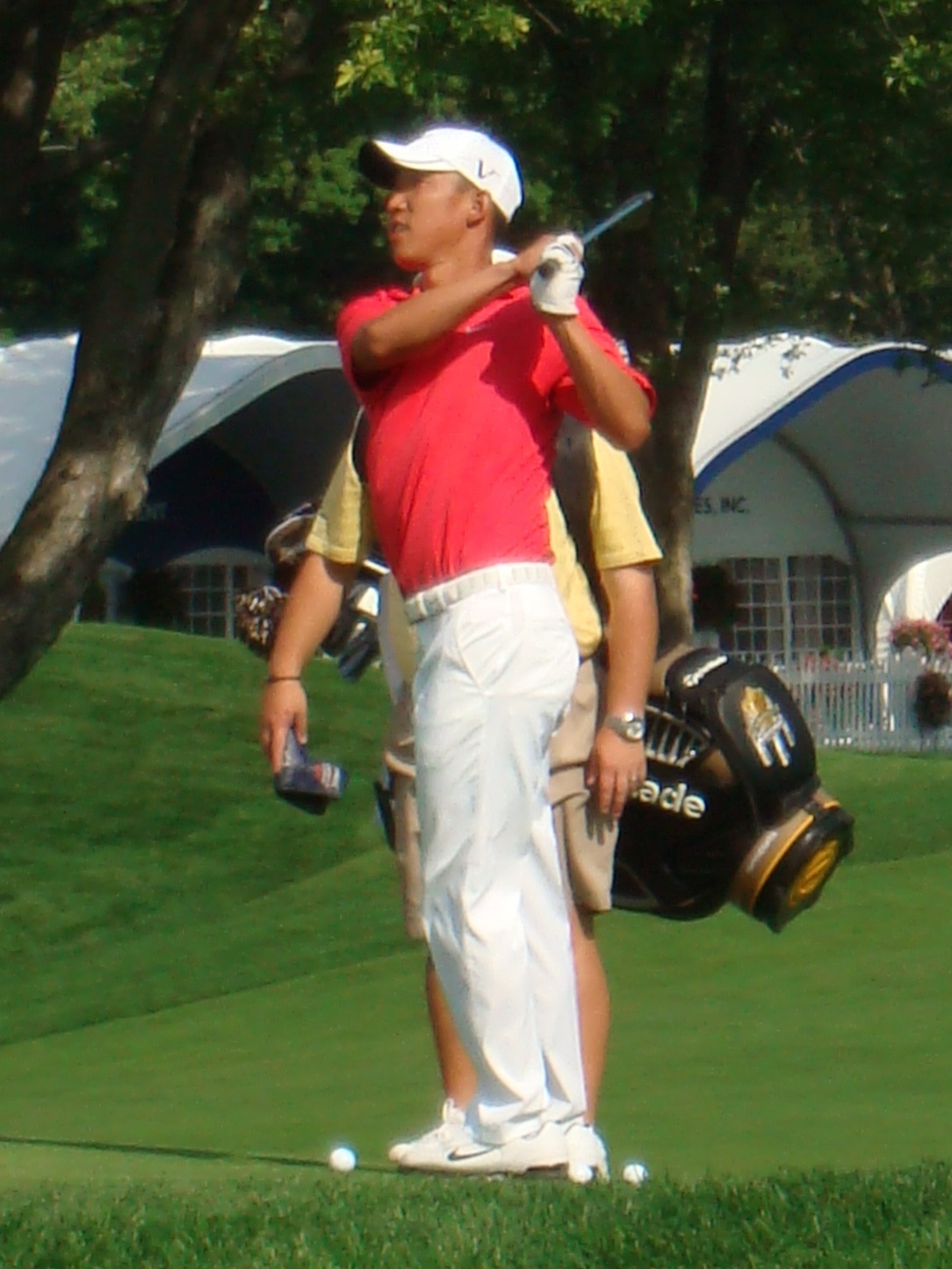
- Kim at the 2009 PGA Championship

Personal information
- Full name: Anthony Ha-Jin Kim
- Nickname: A.K.
- Nationality: United States
- Born: June 19, 1985 (age 41) Los Angeles, California, U.S.
- Height: 5 ft 10 in (1.78 m)
- Weight: 160 lb (73 kg; 11 st)
- Spouse: Emily Stanley
- Children: 1

Career
- Sport: Golf
- College: University of Oklahoma
- Turned professional: 2006
- Current tour: LIV Golf
- Former tours: PGA Tour; European Tour
- Professional wins: 5
- Highest ranking: 6 (September 28, 2008)

Number of wins by tour
- PGA Tour: 3
- LIV Golf: 1
- Other: 1

Best results in major championships
- Masters Tournament: 3rd: 2010
- PGA Championship: T50: 2007
- U.S. Open: T16: 2009
- The Open Championship: T5: 2011

Korean name
- Hangul: 김하진
- RR: Gim Hajin
- MR: Kim Hajin

Anthony Ha-Jin Kim (born June 19, 1985) is an American professional golfer who plays on the LIV Golf League. He previously played on the PGA Tour, where he won three events, and appeared in the 2008 Ryder Cup and the 2009 Presidents Cup. He suffered an Achilles injury in 2012 and did not play professional golf again until 2024, when he signed a contract with LIV Golf. In 2026, Kim won the LIV Golf Adelaide tournament, which was his first professional victory since 2010.

== Early life and amateur career ==
A Korean American, Kim was born in Los Angeles, California, on June 19, 1985. He attended La Quinta High School in La Quinta, California. After high school, he attended the University of Oklahoma for three years; this is where he met his caddie, Brodie Flanders. During his time at Oklahoma, he set the school record for lowest career scoring average in relation to par. He was part of the winning U.S. team in the 2005 Walker Cup.

== Professional career ==
=== 2006–2011: Early years, PGA Tour success ===
Kim turned professional in 2006 and after receiving a sponsor's exemption he finished in a tie for second on his PGA Tour debut at the 2006 Valero Texas Open. He earned his PGA Tour card through the qualifying school for the 2007 season. He made a strong start and broke into the top 100 in the Official World Golf Rankings in May 2007 with four top 10 finishes during his rookie season on the PGA Tour. In the 2007 U.S. Open, he shot a final round 67 earning him a tie for 20th place (he started the day at T57). His 67 was the lowest for the round and second lowest for the tournament.

In May 2008, Kim won his first PGA Tour tournament at the Wachovia Championship, defeating former Open champion Ben Curtis by five shots. Kim's 16-under par 272 total was the lowest score in the tournament's history until 2015. He shot an opening day 70, but rallied for subsequent rounds of 67-66-69 and was several shots clear of Curtis most of the final round. He earned $1,152,000 for his victory, and reached a new career high of 16th in the world rankings.

In July 2008, Kim won his second PGA Tour tournament at the AT&T National, defeating Freddie Jacobson by two shots. Kim shot a 5 under 65 in the fourth round to capture the title. The victory was especially meaningful because the tournament is hosted by Tiger Woods. Furthermore, Kim became the first American under 25 to win twice in one year on the PGA Tour since Tiger Woods in 2000. This win moved him to 14th in the World Rankings. A pair of T-3 finishes in the final two 2008 FedEx Cup events pushed him to 6th in the World Rankings. He has spent over 20 weeks in the top-10 since 2008.

In September 2008, Kim was a critical part of the United States' victory in the Ryder Cup at Valhalla Golf Club, defeating Ryder Cup veteran Sergio García 5 & 4 in the first match of the Sunday single matches. Later that year he joined the European Tour for the 2009 season, making his debut as a member at the 2008 HSBC Champions, the first tournament of the 2009 season.

At the 2009 Masters Tournament in Augusta, Georgia at Augusta National Golf Club, Kim set the record for most birdies in a round with eleven in the second round, surpassing Nick Price, who had ten birdies in 1986.

At the 2009 Presidents Cup, Kim posted an impressive 3–1 record, which included a 5 and 3 victory over Robert Allenby in the Sunday singles match.

Kim lost to Ross Fisher in the finals of the Volvo World Match Play in October 2009 4 & 3 after once again beating Robert Allenby in the semi-finals.

In April 2010, Kim won the Shell Houston Open, beating Vaughn Taylor in a playoff. He became only the fifth player in 30 years to have won three times on the PGA Tour before the age of 25, the others being Tiger Woods, Phil Mickelson, Sergio García and Adam Scott. He followed up with a third-place finish in the Masters Tournament, after a final round 65. Those results were achieved despite a thumb injury for which he underwent surgery in May. Having missed several months of the season, he dropped outside the automatic qualification places for United States team for the 2010 Ryder Cup in the final event, and was not one of captain Corey Pavin's wildcard picks.

=== 2012–2023: Injury problems, hiatus ===
In June 2012, Kim had surgery after injuring the Achilles tendon in his left leg and was expected to miss 9 to 12 months. Kim was eligible for the 2013 season on a Major Medical Exemption, but had failed to play a single tournament since.

In April 2014, Golf Channel reported that Kim no longer plays golf, even on a recreational level. As of 2014, he was reported to have had an insurance policy that would pay him $10-20 million in the case of a career-ending injury. In 2016, Kim played in a number of charity events, but said he was not ready to play professionally again. He also cited ongoing physical therapy and numerous surgeries as the reasons for delaying his return.

In April 2019, during an encounter with a fan in West Hollywood, California, Kim referred to his golf game as "non-existent". On January 1, 2021, Adam Schriber, Kim's longtime coach, posted a photo of the two in front of the Dallas skyline with the caption "2021 is going to be special".

=== 2024–present: Return to professional golf ===
In February 2024, it was announced that Kim would return to professional golf and join the LIV Golf League. He was named as a "wildcard".

Kim played his first competitive tournament since 2012 at LIV Golf Jeddah in March 2024. He placed last at 16-over-par 226, which was 33 shots behind the winner Joaquín Niemann. Kim finished 56th out of 57 players in the 2024 LIV Golf League seasonal rankings. He retained his wildcard status for the 2025 LIV Golf League season, where he finished 55th in the rankings, outside the top-48 cutoff and was relegated. In 23 tournaments during his first two seasons on LIV Golf, his best finish was a tie for 25th at LIV Golf Dallas in 2025.

In November 2025, Kim shot a bogey-free, 7-under 64 at the PIF Saudi International. This was his lowest round since shooting 64 at the 2011 Barclays Singapore Open. He finished the Saudi International in a tie for fifth, which was his first top-10 finish in 14 years. Kim finished third in the LIV Golf Promotions event in January 2026, which earned him a spot in the 2026 LIV Golf League season.

In February 2026, Kim won the LIV Golf Adelaide for his first professional win in nearly 16 years. Starting the final round five shots behind the co-leaders Bryson DeChambeau and Jon Rahm, Kim closed with a 9-under 63 to win by three shots, earning US$4 million for the win.

== Personal life ==
Kim has a daughter with his wife Emily Kim (née Stanley). They live in Dallas, Texas.

Kim has been sober for three years as of 2026, after struggling with drug and alcohol abuse. Kim previously mentioned he had contemplated suicide "for almost two decades even when playing the PGA Tour" and when he entered rehabilitation his "body was shutting down". He stated: "In rehab I found faith, self love and respect and purpose." He credited his wife and daughter for inspiring him to overcome addiction.

== Amateur wins ==
Note: this list may be incomplete.

- 2004 Northeast Amateur

== Professional wins (5) ==
=== PGA Tour wins (3) ===
No.	Date	Tournament	Winning score	To par	Margin of victory	Runner-up
1	May 4, 2008	Wachovia Championship	70-67-66-69=272	−16	5 strokes	(United States) Ben Curtis
2	Jul 6, 2008	AT&T National	67-67-69-65=268	−12	2 strokes	(Sweden) Freddie Jacobson
3	Apr 4, 2010	Shell Houston Open	68-69-69-70=276	−12	Playoff	(United States) Vaughn Taylor

PGA Tour playoff record (1–0)

No.	Year	Tournament	Opponent	Result
1	2010	Shell Houston Open	(United States) Vaughn Taylor	Won with par on first extra hole

=== LIV Golf League wins (1) ===
No.	Date	Tournament	Winning score	To par	Margin of victory	Runner-up
1	Feb 15, 2026	LIV Golf Adelaide	67-67-68-63=265	−23	3 strokes	(Spain) Jon Rahm

=== Other wins (1) ===
No.	Date	Tournament	Winning score	To par	Margin of victory	Runner-up
1	Nov 11, 2009	Kiwi Challenge	71-66=137	−5	Playoff	(United States) Sean O'Hair

Other playoff record (1–2)

No.	Year	Tournament	Opponent	Result
1	2008	Kiwi Challenge	(United States) Hunter Mahan	Lost to par on second extra hole
2	2009	Kiwi Challenge	(United States) Sean O'Hair	Won with bogey on first extra hole
3	2011	Lake Malaren Shanghai Masters	(Northern Ireland) Rory McIlroy	Lost to par on first extra hole

== Results in major championships ==
Tournament	2007	2008	2009	2010	2011
Masters Tournament			T20	3	CUT
U.S. Open	T20	T26	T16		T54
The Open Championship		T7	CUT		T5
PGA Championship	T50	T55	T51	CUT	CUT

Top 10
Did not play

CUT = missed the half-way cut
T = tie

=== Summary ===
Tournament	Wins	2nd	3rd	Top-5	Top-10	Top-25	Events	Cuts made
Masters Tournament	0	0	1	1	1	2	3	2
U.S. Open	0	0	0	0	0	2	4	4
The Open Championship	0	0	0	1	2	2	3	2
PGA Championship	0	0	0	0	0	0	5	3
Totals	0	0	1	2	3	6	15	11

- Most consecutive cuts made – 7 (2007 U.S. Open – 2009 U.S. Open)
- Longest streak of top-10s – 1 (three times)

== Results in The Players Championship ==
Tournament	2007	2008	2009	2010	2011
The Players Championship	CUT	T42	CUT		CUT

Did not play

CUT = missed the halfway cut
"T" indicates a tie for a place

== Results in World Golf Championships ==
Tournament	2008	2009	2010	2011
Match Play		R32	R64	R64
Championship		58	T22	60
Invitational	T36	T36	T76	
Champions		T10	T25	

Top 10
Did not play

QF, R16, R32, R64 = Round in which player lost in match play
"T" = Tied
Note that the HSBC Champions did not become a WGC event until 2009.

== PGA Tour career summary ==
Year	Starts	Cuts made	Wins	2nd	3rd	Top 10	Top 25	Earnings ($)	Money list rank
2006	2	2	0	1	0	1	2	338,067	(non-member)
2007	26	20	0	0	1	4	10	1,545,195	60
2008	22	19	2	1	3	8	10	4,656,265	6
2009	22	17	0	1	2	3	8	1,972,155	39
2010	14	10	1	1	1	4	6	2,574,921	24
2011	26	14	0	0	0	2	7	1,085,846	87
2012	10	2	0	0	0	0	0	33,960	232
Career	122	84	3	4	7	22	43	12,206,409	133*

* Rank as of the 2015–16 season, the last time he appeared on the career money list

== U.S. national team appearances ==
Amateur

- Walker Cup: 2005 (winners)

Professional

- Ryder Cup: 2008 (winners)
- Presidents Cup: 2009 (winners)

== See also ==
- 2006 PGA Tour Qualifying School graduates
