= Ridgewood Country Club =

Country club in New Jersey, U.S.

Coordinates: 40.947°N 74.078°W

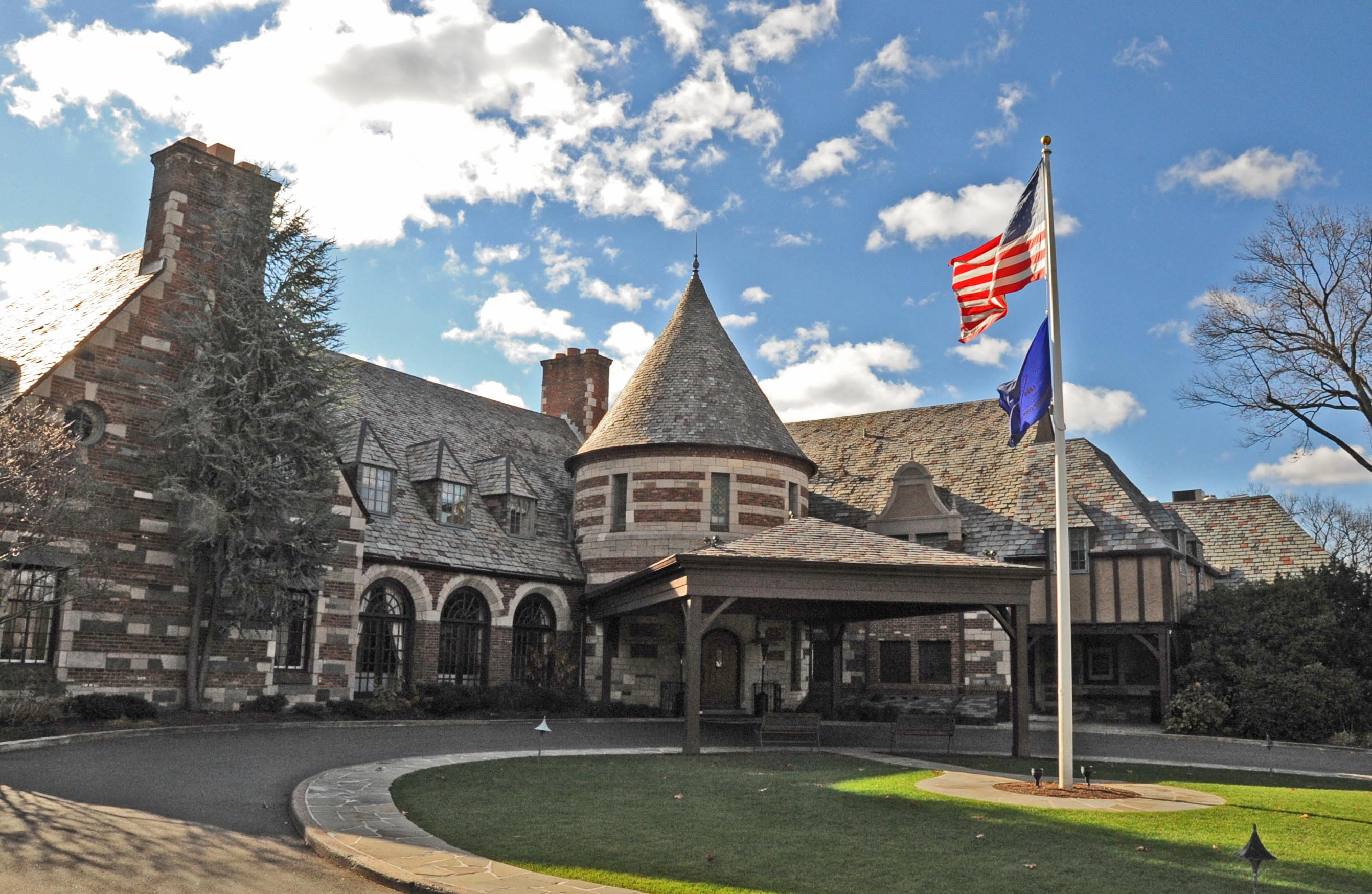

- Location in the United States Location in Bergen County, New Jersey

Club information
- Location: Paramus, New Jersey
- Established: 1929, 97 years ago 1890, 136 years ago (club)
- Type: Private
- Total holes: 27
- Website: rcc1890.com

West, Center, and East nines
- Designed by: A. W. Tillinghast (1929); Gil Hanse & Jim Wagner (2014 renovation)
- Par: 71
- Ridgewood Country Club
- U.S. National Register of Historic Places
- NRHP reference No.: 14000222
- Added to NRHP: May 29, 2015

The Ridgewood Country Club (RCC) is a country club located in Paramus, New Jersey, a suburb northwest of New York City in Bergen County. It was founded in 1890 in neighboring Ho-Ho-Kus, but has been at its current location since 1926. Its facilities were listed on the National Register of Historic Places in 2015.

== History ==
The 27-hole golf course was designed by A. W. Tillinghast in 1929, and the clubhouse was designed by Clifford Wendehack. The greens are seeded with poa annua and bentgrass, and its fairways and tees are seeded with poa annua, bentgrass, and ryegrass. It was certified as an Audubon Cooperative Sanctuary in 1996. Since 2000, RCC has worked with architect Gil Hanse to restore the course back to its Tillinghast roots. Among the improvements have been the construction of 48 new or rebuilt tees, a new irrigation system, a new Greens and Grounds complex, an expansion of the pond on hole #1 on the Center nine, extensive drainage and the rebuilding of all the bunkers back to their original Tillinghast design. The three challenging and scenic nines are known as Center, West, and East, referring to their location relative to the clubhouse.

Golf legend Byron Nelson worked as an assistant professional at the club in the mid-1930s, early in his career and represented Ridgewood for several of his early significant victories. Nelson went on to become one of golf's all-time greatest players.

== Rankings ==
- Ranked #56 Classical in U.S by Golfweek magazine - July 2018
- Ranked #79 in U.S. by Golf Magazine - 2017
- Hole #6 Center ranked among Top 500 Holes in the World by Golf Magazine - 2000
- Ranked #84 Most Prestigious Clubs in America by Golf Connoisseur magazine - Winter 2006
- Holes #4 West and #6 Center Ranked among Sports Illustrated "Tillinghast Dream 18" - June 2006

== Notable events ==
- 2022 U.S. Amateur - Sam Bennett
- 2018 The Northern Trust, first tournament of the FedEx Cup - Bryson DeChambeau
- 2016 U.S. Girls' Junior Championship - Seong Eun-jeong
- 2014 The Barclays, PGA Tour FedEx Cup - Hunter Mahan
- 2010 The Barclays, PGA Tour FedEx Cup - Matt Kuchar
- 2008 The Barclays, PGA Tour FedEx Cup - Vijay Singh
- 2001 Senior PGA Championship - Tom Watson
- 1990 U.S. Senior Open - Lee Trevino
- 1981 Coca-Cola Classic - Kathy Whitworth
- 1974 U.S. Amateur - Jerry Pate
- 1957 U.S. Senior Amateur - J. Clark Espie
- 1935 Ryder Cup - United States
