= PGA Tour Champions records =

These are achievements of play on PGA Tour Champions.

== Individual scoring records ==
Stroke totals

- 72 holes

257 – Pádraig Harrington, 2022 Charles Schwab Cup Championship

- 54 holes

191 – Bruce Fleisher, 2002 RJR Championship
191 – Loren Roberts, 2006 MasterCard Championship at Hualalai
191 – Bernhard Langer, 2007 Administaff Small Business Classic
191 – David Frost, 2013 3M Championship
191 – Rocco Mediate, 2013 Shaw Charity Classic
191 – Phil Mickelson, 2020 Charles Schwab Series at Ozarks National

- 36 holes, opening rounds

124 – Bruce Fleisher, 2002 RJR Championship

- 36 holes, consecutive rounds

124 – Bruce Fleisher, 2002 RJR Championship

- 18 holes

59 – Kevin Sutherland, 2014 Dick's Sporting Goods Open, second round

- 9 holes, front or back nine

27 – Jay Sigel, 1998 Bell Atlantic Classic, front nine, second round
27 – Seiji Ebihara, 2002 Senior PGA Championship, front nine, fourth round

- Lowest non-winning stroke total, 72 holes

264 – Jay Haas, 2012 Charles Schwab Cup Championship

- Lowest non-winning stroke total, 54 holes

192 – Don Pooley, 2006 MasterCard Championship at Hualalai

Strokes to par

- 72 holes

27-under – Jack Nicklaus, 1990 Mazda Senior Tournament Players Championship
27-under – Pádraig Harrington, 2022 Charles Schwab Cup Championship

- 54 holes

25-under – Loren Roberts, 2006 MasterCard Championship at Hualalai
25-under – Bernhard Langer, 2007 Administaff Small Business Classic
25-under – David Frost, 2010 3M Championship

Largest leads

- 54 holes, 72-hole tournament

8 strokes – Jack Nicklaus, 1991 PGA Seniors' Championship
8 strokes – Bernhard Langer, 2014 Senior Open Championship
8 strokes – Bernhard Langer, 2015 Constellation Senior Players Championship

- 36 holes

8 strokes – Arnold Palmer, 1984 PGA Seniors' Championship
8 strokes – Don Bies, 1989 Murata Seniors Reunion
8 strokes – Larry Nelson, 1998 Pittsburgh Senior Classic
8 strokes – Isao Aoki, 1998 BellSouth Senior Classic at Opryland
8 strokes – Hale Irwin, 1998 Ameritech Senior Open

- 18 holes

5 strokes – Lee Elder, 1985 Merrill Lynch/Golf Digest Commemorative Pro-Am
5 strokes – Bob Charles, 1988 General Foods PGA Seniors' Championship
5 strokes – Bob Murphy, 1996 Cadillac NFL Golf Classic
5 strokes – Walter Morgan, 1996 Ameritech Senior Open
5 strokes – Allen Doyle, 2000 IR Senior Tour Championship
5 strokes – Nick Price, 2011 Toshiba Classic

Largest winning margins

- 72 holes

13 strokes – Bernhard Langer, 2014 Senior Open Championship

- 54 holes

11 strokes – Fred Funk, 2007 Turtle Bay Championship

Miscellaneous

- Best scoring average, season

67.96 – Fred Couples, 2010

- Most consecutive rounds of par or less

38 – Jay Haas, 2014

- Most consecutive sub-par rounds

31 – Gil Morgan, 2000

- Most consecutive sub-70 rounds

13 – Hale Irwin, 1999
13 – Corey Pavin, 2010

- Lowest start by a winner

60 – Bruce Fleisher, 2002 RJR Championship
60 – Tom Purtzer, 2004 Toshiba Senior Classic
60 – Nick Price, 2011 Toshiba Classic
60 – Michael Allen, 2014 Allianz Championship

- Highest start by a winner

77 – Hale Irwin, 1998 U.S. Senior Open

- Lowest finish by a winner

61 – Rocky Thompson, 1994 GTE Suncoast Classic
61 – Loren Roberts, 2006 MasterCard Championship at Hualalai
61 – David Frost, 2010 3M Championship
61 – Gary Hallberg, 2010 Ensure Classic at Rock Barn
61 – Fred Couples, 2014 Shaw Charity Classic

- Highest finish by a winner

76 – Lee Elder, 1985 Denver Post Champions of Golf

- Best birdie streak, round

8 – Chi-Chi Rodríguez, 1987 Silver Pages Classic
8 – Jim Colbert, 2000 TD Waterhouse Championship
8 – Dana Quigley, 2005 Bruno's Memorial Classic
8 – Naomichi Ozaki, 2006 Ford Senior Players Championship

- Best eagle-birdie streak, round

1-7 — Jay Sigel, 1998 Bell Atlantic Classic
1-7 — Kevin Sutherland, 2014 Dick's Sporting Goods Open, second round (birdies on holes 1–4, eagle on 5, birdies on 6–8)

- Eagles, round

3 – Don January, 1985 Senior PGA Tour Roundup
3 – Jimmy Powell, 1985 The Greenbrier American Express Championship
3 – Rocky Thompson, 1992 Kaanapali Classic
3 – Bruce Lietzke, 2003 MasterCard Championship
3 – Curt Byrum, 2009 Senior Open Championship
3 – Tom Kite, 2011 Greater Hickory Classic at Rock Barn
3 – Jay Don Blake, 2013 Shaw Charity Classic
3 – Tom Lehman, 2016 Mitsubishi Electric Championship at Hualalai
3 – Wes Short Jr., 2016 Tucson Conquistadores Classic
3 – Fran Quinn, 2016 Principal Charity Classic

- Fewest putts, round

17 – Bob Brue, 1994 Kroger Senior Classic, second round

- Fewest putts, 9 holes

7 – Bob Brue, 1994 Kroger Senior Classic, back nine, second round

== Tournament scoring records (full-field) ==
Highest averages

- Event

78.634 – 1989 Murata Seniors Reunion

- First round

80.118 – 2005 Senior British Open

- Second round

79.420 – 1989 Murata Seniors Reunion

- Third round

79.205 – 1990 GTE Kaanapali Classic

- Fourth round

76.474 – 1998 Las Vegas Senior Classic

Lowest averages

- Event

68.175 – 2005 Blue Angels Classic

- First round

68.346 – 2005 Blue Angels Classic

- Second round

68.128 – 2005 Blue Angels Classic

- Third round

68.051 – 2005 Blue Angels Classic

- Fourth round

70.662 – 2003 Senior British Open

== Victory records ==
Career records

- Most victories

47 – Bernhard Langer

- Most victories, Georgia-Pacific Grand Champions

35 – Don January

- Most consecutive seasons with a victory

17 – Bernhard Langer, 2007–2024

- Most consecutive seasons with multiple victories

11 – Hale Irwin, 1995–2005, Bernhard Langer 2012-2023

- Most consecutive victories

4 – Chi-Chi Rodríguez, 1987 Vantage at The Dominion, 1987 United Hospitals Classic, 1987 Silver Pages Classic, 1987 Senior Players Reunion Pro-Am

- Most consecutive victories, tour debut

2 – Bruce Fleisher, 1999 Royal Caribbean Classic, 1999 American Express Invitational

- Longest time between victories

8 years, 8 months, 28 days – Craig Stadler

- Longest time between first and last Champions Tour victories

15 years, 4 months, 6 days – Bernhard Langer

- Longest time between last PGA Tour victory and first Champions Tour victory

28 years, 9 months, 27 days – Mike Fetchick

- Winning Georgia-Pacific Grand Champions event and overall tournament

2 – Jimmy Powell, 1995 First of America Classic, 1996 Brickyard Crossing Championship

- Most Champions Tour major victories

12 – Bernhard Langer, 2010-2023

- Most Senior PGA Championship major victories

4 – Hale Irwin, 1996, 1997, 1998, 2004

- Most Senior Players Championship major victories

3 – Bernhard Langer, 2014, 2015, 2016

- Most Senior British Open major victories

4 – Bernhard Langer, 2010, 2014, 2017, 2019

- Most U.S. Senior Open major victories

3 – Miller Barber, 1982, 1984, 1985

- Most The Tradition major victories

4 – Jack Nicklaus, 1990, 1991, 1995, 1996

Season records

- Most victories

9 – Peter Thomson, 1985
9 – Hale Irwin, 1997

- Most victories, Georgia-Pacific Grand Champions

9 – Joe Jimenez, 1989
9 – Joe Jimenez, 1990
9 – Don January, 1990
9 – Don January, 1991
9 – Jim Ferree, 1993

- Most different winners

25 – 1995, 2003

- Most first-time winners

11 – 1999

- Most rookie winners

5 – 1989, 1999, 2007, 2013 (7 events), 2014

- Most multiple winners

10 – 1987, 1988, 1993, 1996, 2001, 2008

- Most title defenses

6 – 1991, 2000

Tournament records

- Most victories

6 – Hale Irwin, 1997 Hyatt Regency Maui Kaanapali Classic, 2000 EMC Kaanapali Classic, 2001, 2002, 2003, 2005 Turtle Bay Championship

- Most consecutive victories

5 – Hale Irwin, 2000 EMC Kaanapali Classic & 2001, 2002, 2003, 2005 Turtle Bay Championship (no event in 2004)

- Biggest come-from-behind victory, final round

10 strokes – Jay Sigel, 1994 GTE West Classic

Playoff records

- Most playoffs, season

9 – 2002

- Most sudden-death holes

10 – 1998 Royal Caribbean Classic

- Most players in sudden-death playoff

7 – 2007 Boeing Classic

== Single tournament records ==
Scoring

- Most birdies, 72-hole tournament

28 – Jack Nicklaus, 1990 Mazda Senior Tournament Players Championship

- Most birdies, 54-hole tournament

26 – Loren Roberts, 2006 MasterCard Championship at Hualalai
26 – Fred Couples, 2011 AT&T Championship
26 – Duffy Waldorf, 2015 Toshiba Classic

- Largest scoring swing from one round to the next

21 strokes – Jimmy Powell, 93 to 72 strokes, second and third rounds, 1990 Murata Reunion Pro-Am

Statistics

- Best driving distance average

344.2 yards – Andy Bean, 2003 Allianz Championship

- Longest drive

422 yards – Jim Dent, 1996 The Tradition
422 yards – Jay Sigel, 1996 The Tradition

- Best driving accuracy, 54-hole tournament

42 of 42 fairways – Calvin Peete, 1996 VFW Senior Championship
42 of 42 fairways – Ed Dougherty, 2005 The ACE Group Classic
42 of 42 fairways – Hale Irwin, 2010 Ensure Classic at Rock Barn

- Best total driving

2 – Charles Coody, 1990 Las Vegas Senior Classic
2 – Raymond Floyd, 1993 Hyatt Senior TOUR Championship
2 – J. C. Snead, 1996 The Tradition

- Best greens in regulation, 54-hole tournament

53 of 54 – John Huston, 2006 Regions Charity Classic

- Fewest putts

69 – Lee Elder, 1988 Gus Machado Senior Classic

Age

- Youngest winner

50 years, 10 days – Bobby Wadkins, 2001 Lightpath Long Island Classic

- Oldest winner

65 years, 309 days – Bernhard Langer, 2023 U.S. Senior Open

- Oldest major winner

65 years, 309 days – Bernhard Langer, 2023 U.S. Senior Open

- Youngest to shoot their age or better

61 years old – Walter Morgan, 60 strokes, 2002 AT&T Canada Senior Open Championship

- Oldest to shoot their age or better

85 years old – Harold "Jug" McSpaden, 81 strokes, 1994 PGA Seniors' Championship

== Awards ==
- Most Jack Nicklaus Trophies

9 – Bernhard Langer, 2008, 2009, 2010, 2014, 2015, 2016, 2017, 2018, 2020-21

- Most Arnold Palmer Awards

11 – Bernhard Langer, 2008, 2009, 2010, 2012, 2013, 2014, 2015, 2016, 2017, 2018, 2020-21

- Most Charles Schwab Cups

6 – Bernhard Langer, 2010, 2014, 2015, 2016, 2018, 2020-21

- Most Charles Schwab Cup points, career

25,680 – Bernhard Langer, 2007–2017 (n.b. system changed in 2018 to make the points equal to money earned on tour that year)

- Most Charles Schwab Cup points, season

4,370 – Tom Watson, 2003 (n.b. system changed in 2018 to make the points equal to money earned on tour that year)

- Most Charles Schwab Cup money earned, career

$8,200,000 – Bernhard Langer, 2008–2021

- Most Champions Tour Comeback Player of the Year Awards

2 – Hubert Green, 2002, 2004

- Most Byron Nelson Awards

6 – Bernhard Langer, 2008, 2009, 2014, 2015, 2016, 2018

== Miscellaneous records ==
Earnings

- Money earned, career

$35,964,514 – Bernhard Langer, 2007-2023 (as of 2023 Charles Schwab Cup Championship)

- Money earned, Georgia-Pacific Grand Champions career

$1,951,663 – Bob Charles

- Money earned, season

$3,677,359 – Bernhard Langer, 2017

- Money earned, Georgia-Pacific Grand Champions season

$364,988 – George Archer, 2000

- Money earned, rookie

$2,515,705 – Bruce Fleisher, 1999

- Money earned without a victory, season

$1,549,819 – Tom Kite, 2003

- Most consecutive seasons leading money list

7 – Bernhard Langer, 2012–2018

- Most years in top 10 on money list

12 – Hale Irwin and Bernhard Langer

- Most consecutive years in top 10 on money list

11 – Hale Irwin, 1995–2005

- Most consecutive $1-million seasons

11 – Gil Morgan, 1997–2007

- Most consecutive $2-million seasons

7 – Bernhard Langer, 2012–2018

Finishes

- Most top ten finishes, season

26 – Lee Trevino, 1990

- Most top ten finishes, career

210 – Hale Irwin

- Most consecutive top five finishes

19 – Hale Irwin, 1997-1998

- Most consecutive top ten finishes

36 – Don January, 1980-1984

Participation

- Most tournaments played, season

39 – Dana Quigley, 2000

- Most consecutive eligible tournaments played

278 – Dana Quigley, 1997-2005

- Most consecutive tournaments played

264 – Dana Quigley, 1998-2005

- Most rounds played, season

119 – Bruce Summerhays, 1996
119 – Dana Quigley, 1998
119 – Dana Quigley, 1999

Scoring

- Most sub-70 rounds, season

59 – Larry Nelson, 2000

- Most sub-par rounds, season

82 – Tom Wargo, 1994

- Most bogey-free tournaments

4 – Hale Irwin, 1995 Vantage Championship, 1996 American Express Invitational, 1997 Boone Valley Classic, 1997 Vantage Championship

- Longest bogey-free streak

98 holes – Morris Hatalsky, 2003

Season statistics

- Driving distance (1988–present)

301.5 yards – Steve Thomas, 2009

- Driving accuracy (1988–present)

85.87% – Joe Durant, 2014

- Total driving (1991–present)

13 – Larry Gilbert, 1993
13 – Joe Durant, 2014

- Greens in regulation (1988–present)

78.35% – Bernhard Langer, 2014

- Putting (1988–present)

1.693 – Fred Couples, 2010

- Sand saves (1988–present)

69.64% – Ron Streck, 2008

- All-around (1988–present)

22 – Lee Trevino, 1990
