= 1999 Senior PGA Tour =

Golf tour season

1999 Senior PGA Tour season
- Duration: January 22, 1999 – November 7, 1999
- Number of official events: 39
- Most wins: (United States) Bruce Fleisher (7)
- Money list: (United States) Bruce Fleisher
- Player of the Year: (United States) Bruce Fleisher
- Rookie of the Year: (United States) Bruce Fleisher

The 1999 Senior PGA Tour was the 20th season of the Senior PGA Tour, the main professional golf tour in the United States for men aged 50 and over.

== Schedule ==
The following table lists official events during the 1999 season.

Date	Tournament	Location	Purse (US$)	Winner (Note: The number in parentheses after each winner's name is the number of Senior PGA Tour events they had won up to and including that tournament. This information is only shown for Senior PGA Tour members.)	Notes
Jan 24	MasterCard Championship	Hawaii	1,100,000	(United States) John Jacobs (2)	
Feb 7	Royal Caribbean Classic	Florida	1,000,000	(United States) Bruce Fleisher (1)	
Feb 14	American Express Invitational	Florida	1,200,000	(United States) Bruce Fleisher (2)	
Feb 21	GTE Classic	Florida	1,200,000	(United States) Larry Nelson (4)	
Feb 28	ACE Group Classic	Florida	1,200,000	(United States) Allen Doyle (1)	
Mar 14	Toshiba Senior Classic	California	1,200,000	(United States) Gary McCord (1)	
Mar 28	Emerald Coast Classic	Florida	1,100,000	(United States) Bob Duval (1)	
Apr 4	The Tradition	Arizona	1,500,000	(Australia) Graham Marsh (6)	Senior PGA Tour major championship
Apr 18	PGA Seniors' Championship	Florida	1,750,000	(United States) Allen Doyle (2)	Senior major championship
Apr 25	Home Depot Invitational	North Carolina	1,200,000	(United States) Bruce Fleisher (3)	
May 2	Bruno's Memorial Classic	Alabama	1,200,000	(United States) Larry Nelson (5)	
May 9	Nationwide Championship	Georgia	1,400,000	(United States) Hale Irwin (21)	
May 16	Las Vegas Senior Classic	Nevada	1,400,000	(Argentina) Vicente Fernández (3)	
May 23	Bell Atlantic Classic	Pennsylvania	1,100,000	(United States) Tom Jenkins (1)	
May 30	Boone Valley Classic	Missouri	1,400,000	(United States) Hale Irwin (22)	
Jun 6	Cadillac NFL Golf Classic	New Jersey	1,100,000	(United States) Allen Doyle (3)	
Jun 13	BellSouth Senior Classic	Tennessee	1,400,000	(United States) Bruce Fleisher (4)	
Jun 20	Southwestern Bell Dominion	Texas	1,100,000	(United States) John Mahaffey (1)	
Jun 27	Ford Senior Players Championship	Michigan	2,000,000	(United States) Hale Irwin (23)	Senior PGA Tour major championship
Jul 4	State Farm Senior Classic	Maryland	1,300,000	(Republic of Ireland) Christy O'Connor Jnr (1)	
Jul 11	U.S. Senior Open	Iowa	1,500,000	(United States) Dave Eichelberger (4)	Senior major championship
Jul 18	Ameritech Senior Open	Illinois	1,300,000	(United States) Hale Irwin (24)	
Jul 25	Senior British Open	Northern Ireland	£560,000	(Republic of Ireland) Christy O'Connor Jnr (2)	Senior major championship (Note: Unofficial money event at the time, but retrospectively counted as an official win.)
Jul 25	Coldwell Banker Burnet Classic	Minnesota	1,500,000	(United States) Hale Irwin (25)	
Aug 1	Novell Utah Showdown	Utah	1,350,000	(United States) Dave Eichelberger (5)	
Aug 8	Lightpath Long Island Classic	New York	1,200,000	(United States) Bruce Fleisher (5)	
Aug 15	Foremost Insurance Championship	Michigan	1,000,000	(Republic of Ireland) Christy O'Connor Jnr (3)	
Aug 22	BankBoston Classic	Massachusetts	1,200,000	(United States) Tom McGinnis (1)	
Aug 29	AT&T Canada Senior Open Championship	Canada	1,350,000	(United States) Jim Ahern (1)	
Sep 5	TD Waterhouse Championship	Missouri	1,200,000	(United States) Allen Doyle (4)	
Sep 12	Comfort Classic	Indiana	1,200,000	(United States) Gil Morgan (14)	
Sep 19	Bank One Championship	Texas	1,300,000	(United States) Tom Watson (1)	New tournament
Sep 26	Kroger Senior Classic	Ohio	1,400,000	(United States) Gil Morgan (15)	
Oct 3	Vantage Championship	North Carolina	1,500,000	(United States) Fred Gibson (1)	
Oct 10	The Transamerica	California	1,100,000	(United States) Bruce Fleisher (6)	
Oct 17	Raley's Gold Rush Classic	California	1,000,000	(Australia) David Graham (5)	
Oct 24	EMC Kaanapali Classic	Hawaii	1,000,000	(United States) Bruce Fleisher (7)	
Oct 31	Pacific Bell Senior Classic	California	1,200,000	(United States) Joe Inman (2)	
Nov 7	Ingersoll-Rand Senior Tour Championship	South Carolina	2,000,000	(United States) Gary McCord (2)	Tour Championship

=== Unofficial events ===
The following events were sanctioned by the Senior PGA Tour, but did not carry official money, nor were wins official.

Date	Tournament	Location	Purse ($)	Winners	Notes
Dec 5	Office Depot Father/Son Challenge	Florida	860,000	(United States) Jack Nicklaus and son Gary Nicklaus	Team event

== Money list ==
The money list was based on prize money won during the season, calculated in U.S. dollars.

Position	Player	Prize money ($)
1	(United States) Bruce Fleisher	2,515,705
2	(United States) Hale Irwin	2,025,232
3	(United States) Allen Doyle	1,911,640
4	(United States) Larry Nelson	1,513,524
5	(United States) Gil Morgan	1,493,282

== Awards ==
Award	Winner	Ref.
Player of the Year (Jack Nicklaus Trophy)	(United States) Bruce Fleisher	
Rookie of the Year	(United States) Bruce Fleisher	
Scoring leader (Byron Nelson Award)	(United States) Bruce Fleisher	
Comeback Player of the Year	(United States) Tom Jenkins	
