= 1997 Senior PGA Tour =

Golf tour season

1997 Senior PGA Tour season
- Duration: January 17, 1997 – November 9, 1997
- Number of official events: 39
- Most wins: (United States) Hale Irwin (9)
- Money list: (United States) Hale Irwin
- Player of the Year: (United States) Hale Irwin
- Rookie of the Year: (United States) Gil Morgan

The 1997 Senior PGA Tour was the 18th season of the Senior PGA Tour, the main professional golf tour in the United States for men aged 50 and over.

== Schedule ==
The following table lists official events during the 1997 season.

Date	Tournament	Location	Purse (US$)	Winner (Note: The number in parentheses after each winner's name is the number of Senior PGA Tour events they had won up to and including that tournament. This information is only shown for Senior PGA Tour members.)	Notes
Jan 19	MasterCard Championship	Hawaii	1,000,000	(United States) Hale Irwin (5)	
Feb 2	Royal Caribbean Classic	Florida	850,000	(United States) Gibby Gilbert (6)	
Feb 9	LG Championship	Florida	1,000,000	(United States) Hale Irwin (6)	
Feb 16	GTE Classic	Florida	900,000	(Australia) David Graham (1)	
Feb 23	American Express Invitational	Florida	1,200,000	(United States) Buddy Allin (1)	
Mar 16	Toshiba Senior Classic	California	1,000,000	(United States) Bob Murphy (11)	
Mar 30	Southwestern Bell Dominion	Texas	800,000	(Australia) David Graham (2)	
Apr 6	The Tradition	Arizona	1,200,000	(United States) Gil Morgan (2)	Senior PGA Tour major championship
Apr 20	PGA Seniors' Championship	Florida	1,200,000	(United States) Hale Irwin (7)	Senior major championship
Apr 27	Las Vegas Senior Classic	Nevada	1,000,000	(United States) Hale Irwin (8)	
May 4	Bruno's Memorial Classic	Alabama	1,150,000	(United States) Jay Sigel (3)	
May 11	Home Depot Invitational	North Carolina	900,000	(United States) Jim Dent (11)	
May 18	Cadillac NFL Golf Classic	New Jersey	950,000	(Australia) Bruce Crampton (20)	
May 25	Bell Atlantic Classic	Pennsylvania	1,000,000	(United States) Bob Eastwood (1)	
Jun 1	Ameritech Senior Open	Illinois	1,200,000	(United States) Gil Morgan (3)	
Jun 8	BellSouth Senior Classic	Tennessee	1,300,000	(United States) Gil Morgan (4)	
Jun 15	du Maurier Champions	Canada	1,100,000	(United States) Jack Kiefer (2)	
Jun 22	Nationwide Championship	Georgia	1,300,000	(Australia) Graham Marsh (4)	
Jun 29	U.S. Senior Open	Illinois	1,300,000	(Australia) Graham Marsh (5)	Senior major championship
Jul 6	Kroger Senior Classic	Ohio	1,000,000	(United States) Jay Sigel (4)	
Jul 13	Ford Senior Players Championship	Michigan	1,800,000	(United States) Larry Gilbert (3)	Senior PGA Tour major championship
Jul 20	Burnet Senior Classic	Minnesota	1,350,000	(United States) Hale Irwin (9)	
Jul 27	Senior British Open	Northern Ireland	£350,000	(South Africa) Gary Player (21)	Senior major championship (Note: Unofficial money event at the time, but retrospectively counted as an official win.)
Jul 27	Franklin Quest Championship	Utah	1,000,000	(United States) Dave Stockton (14)	
Aug 3	BankBoston Classic	Massachusetts	1,000,000	(United States) Hale Irwin (10)	
Aug 10	Northville Long Island Classic	New York	1,000,000	(United States) Dana Quigley (1)	
Aug 17	First of America Classic	Michigan	1,000,000	(United States) Gil Morgan (5)	
Aug 24	Saint Luke's Classic	Missouri	1,000,000	(United States) Bruce Summerhays (1)	
Aug 31	Pittsburgh Senior Classic	Pennsylvania	1,100,000	(South Africa) Hugh Baiocchi (1)	
Sep 7	Bank One Classic	Kentucky	800,000	(Argentina) Vicente Fernández (2)	
Sep 14	Boone Valley Classic	Missouri	1,300,000	(United States) Hale Irwin (11)	
Sep 21	Comfort Classic	Indiana	1,050,000	(Australia) David Graham (3)	
Sep 28	Emerald Coast Classic	Florida	1,100,000	(Japan) Isao Aoki (7)	
Oct 5	Vantage Championship	North Carolina	1,500,000	(United States) Hale Irwin (12)	
Oct 12	The Transamerica	California	800,000	(United States) Dave Eichelberger (3)	
Oct 19	Hyatt Regency Maui Kaanapali Classic	Hawaii	850,000	(United States) Hale Irwin (13)	
Oct 26	Raley's Gold Rush Classic	California	900,000	(United States) Bob Eastwood (2)	
Nov 2	Ralphs Senior Classic	California	1,000,000	(United States) Gil Morgan (6)	
Nov 9	Energizer Senior Tour Championship	South Carolina	1,850,000	(United States) Gil Morgan (7)	Tour Championship

=== Unofficial events ===
The following events were sanctioned by the Senior PGA Tour, but did not carry official money, nor were wins official.

Date	Tournament	Location	Purse ($)	Winners	Notes
Dec 7	Office Depot Father/Son Challenge	Florida	860,000	(United States) Raymond Floyd and son Raymond Floyd Jr.	Team event

== Money list ==
The money list was based on prize money won during the season, calculated in U.S. dollars.

Position	Player	Prize money ($)
1	(United States) Hale Irwin	2,343,364
2	(United States) Gil Morgan	2,160,562
3	(Japan) Isao Aoki	1,410,499
4	(United States) Jay Sigel	1,294,838
5	(Australia) David Graham	1,173,579

== Awards ==
Award	Winner	Ref.
Player of the Year (Jack Nicklaus Trophy)	(United States) Hale Irwin	
Rookie of the Year	(United States) Gil Morgan	
Scoring leader (Byron Nelson Award)	(United States) Hale Irwin	
Comeback Player of the Year	(United States) George Archer	
