= 1996 Senior PGA Tour =

Golf tour season

1996 Senior PGA Tour season
- Duration: January 19, 1997 – November 10, 1997
- Number of official events: 40
- Most wins: (United States) Jim Colbert (5)
- Money list: (United States) Jim Colbert
- Player of the Year: (United States) Jim Colbert
- Rookie of the Year: (South Africa) John Bland

The 1996 Senior PGA Tour was the 17th season of the Senior PGA Tour, the main professional golf tour in the United States for men aged 50 and over.

== Schedule ==
The following table lists official events during the 1996 season.

Date	Tournament	Location	Purse (US$)	Winner (Note: The number in parentheses after each winner's name is the number of Senior PGA Tour events they had won up to and including that tournament. This information is only shown for Senior PGA Tour members.)	Notes
Jan 21	Puerto Rico Senior Tournament of Champions	Puerto Rico	800,000	(South Africa) John Bland (2)	
Feb 4	Royal Caribbean Classic	Florida	850,000	(United States) Bob Murphy (9)	
Feb 11	Greater Naples IntelliNet Challenge	Florida	600,000	(United States) Al Geiberger (10)	
Feb 18	GTE Suncoast Classic	Florida	750,000	(United States) Jack Nicklaus (9)	
Feb 25	American Express Invitational	Florida	900,000	(United States) Hale Irwin (3)	New tournament
Mar 3	FHP Health Care Classic	California	800,000	(United States) Walter Morgan (2)	
Mar 17	Toshiba Senior Classic	California	1,000,000	(United States) Jim Colbert (14)	
Mar 31	SBC Dominion Seniors	Texas	650,000	(United States) Tom Weiskopf (3)	
Apr 7	The Tradition	Arizona	1,000,000	(United States) Jack Nicklaus (10)	Senior PGA Tour major championship
Apr 21	PGA Seniors' Championship	Florida	1,100,000	(United States) Hale Irwin (4)	Senior major championship
Apr 28	Las Vegas Senior Classic	Nevada	1,000,000	(United States) Jim Colbert (15)	
May 5	PaineWebber Invitational	North Carolina	800,000	(Australia) Graham Marsh (2)	
May 12	Nationwide Championship	Georgia	1,200,000	(United States) Jim Colbert (16)	
May 19	Cadillac NFL Golf Classic	New Jersey	950,000	(United States) Bob Murphy (10)	
May 26	BellSouth Senior Classic	Tennessee	1,200,000	(Japan) Isao Aoki (5)	
Jun 2	Bruno's Memorial Classic	Alabama	1,050,000	(South Africa) John Bland (3)	
Jun 9	Pittsburgh Senior Classic	Pennsylvania	1,100,000	(United States) Tom Weiskopf (4)	
Jun 16	du Maurier Champions	Canada	1,100,000	(United States) Charles Coody (5)	
Jun 23	Bell Atlantic Classic	Pennsylvania	900,000	(United States) Dale Douglass (11)	
Jun 30	Kroger Senior Classic	Ohio	900,000	(Japan) Isao Aoki (6)	
Jul 7	U.S. Senior Open	Ohio	1,200,000	(United States) Dave Stockton (12)	Senior major championship
Jul 14	Ford Senior Players Championship	Michigan	1,500,000	(United States) Raymond Floyd (13)	Senior PGA Tour major championship
Jul 21	Burnet Senior Classic	Minnesota	1,250,000	(Argentina) Vicente Fernández (1)	
Jul 28	Senior British Open	Northern Ireland	£350,000	(Scotland) Brian Barnes (2)	Senior major championship (Note: Unofficial money event at the time, but retrospectively counted as an official win.)
Jul 28	Ameritech Senior Open	Illinois	1,100,000	(United States) Walter Morgan (3)	
Aug 4	VFW Senior Championship	Missouri	800,000	(United States) Dave Eichelberger (2)	
Aug 11	First of America Classic	Michigan	850,000	(United States) Dave Stockton (13)	
Aug 18	Northville Long Island Classic	New York	800,000	(South Africa) John Bland (4)	
Aug 25	Bank of Boston Senior Classic	Massachusetts	800,000	(United States) Jim Dent (10)	
Sep 1	Franklin Quest Championship	Utah	800,000	(Australia) Graham Marsh (3)	
Sep 8	Boone Valley Classic	Missouri	1,200,000	(United States) Gibby Gilbert (5)	New tournament
Sep 15	Bank One Classic	Kentucky	600,000	(United States) Mike Hill (18)	
Sep 22	Brickyard Crossing Championship	Indiana	750,000	(United States) Jimmy Powell (4)	
Sep 29	Vantage Championship	North Carolina	1,500,000	(United States) Jim Colbert (17)	
Oct 6	Ralphs Senior Classic	California	800,000	(United States) Gil Morgan (1)	
Oct 13	The Transamerica	California	700,000	(South Africa) John Bland (5)	
Oct 20	Raley's Gold Rush Classic	California	800,000	(United States) Jim Colbert (18)	
Oct 27	Hyatt Regency Maui Kaanapali Classic	Hawaii	650,000	(New Zealand) Bob Charles (25)	
Nov 3	Emerald Coast Classic	Florida	1,050,000	(United States) Lee Trevino (27)	
Nov 10	Energizer Senior Tour Championship	South Carolina	1,600,000	(United States) Jay Sigel (2)	Tour Championship

=== Unofficial events ===
The following events were sanctioned by the Senior PGA Tour, but did not carry official money, nor were wins official.

Date	Tournament	Location	Purse ($)	Winners	Notes
Dec 8	Office Depot Father/Son Challenge	Florida	860,000	(United States) Raymond Floyd and son Raymond Floyd Jr.	Team event

== Money list ==
The money list was based on prize money won during the season, calculated in U.S. dollars.

Position	Player	Prize money ($)
1	(United States) Jim Colbert	1,627,890
2	(United States) Hale Irwin	1,615,769
3	(South Africa) John Bland	1,357,987
4	(Japan) Isao Aoki	1,162,581
5	(United States) Dave Stockton	1,117,685

== Awards ==
Award	Winner	Ref.
Player of the Year (Jack Nicklaus Trophy)	(United States) Jim Colbert	
Rookie of the Year	(South Africa) John Bland	
Scoring leader (Byron Nelson Award)	(United States) Hale Irwin	
Comeback Player of the Year	(United States) Al Geiberger	
