= 2001 Senior PGA Tour =

Golf tour season

2001 Senior PGA Tour season
- Duration: January 19, 2001 – October 28, 2001
- Number of official events: 38 (Note: One further tournament was scheduled but was canceled.)
- Most wins: (United States) Larry Nelson (5)
- Charles Schwab Cup: (United States) Allen Doyle
- Money list: (United States) Allen Doyle
- Player of the Year: (United States) Allen Doyle
- Rookie of the Year: (United States) Bob Gilder

The 2001 Senior PGA Tour was the 22nd season of the Senior PGA Tour, the main professional golf tour in the United States for men aged 50 and over.

== Schedule ==
The following table lists official events during the 2001 season.

Date	Tournament	Location	Purse (US$)	Winner (Note: The number in parentheses after each winner's name is the number of Senior PGA Tour events they had won up to and including that tournament. This information is only shown for Senior PGA Tour members.)	Notes
Jan 21	MasterCard Championship	Hawaii	1,400,000	(United States) Larry Nelson (12)	
Feb 4	Royal Caribbean Classic	Florida	1,400,000	(United States) Larry Nelson (13)	
Feb 11	ACE Group Classic	Florida	1,400,000	(United States) Gil Morgan (19)	
Feb 18	Verizon Classic	Florida	1,400,000	(United States) Bob Gilder (1)	
Feb 25	Mexico Senior Classic	Mexico	1,500,000	(United States) Mike McCullough (1)	
Mar 4	Toshiba Senior Classic	California	1,400,000	(Spain) José María Cañizares (1)	
Mar 11	SBC Senior Classic	California	1,400,000	(United States) Jim Colbert (20)	
Mar 18	Siebel Classic in Silicon Valley	California	1,400,000	(United States) Hale Irwin (30)	New tournament
Mar 25	Emerald Coast Classic	Florida	1,400,000	(United States) Mike McCullough (2)	
Apr 15	The Countrywide Tradition	Arizona	1,700,000	(United States) Doug Tewell (4)	Senior PGA Tour major championship
Apr 22	Las Vegas Senior Classic	Nevada	1,400,000	(United States) Bruce Fleisher (12)	
Apr 29	Bruno's Memorial Classic	Alabama	1,400,000	(United States) Hale Irwin (31)	
May 6	Home Depot Invitational	North Carolina	1,300,000	(United States) Bruce Fleisher (13)	
May 13	Enterprise Rent-A-Car Match Play Championship	Missouri	2,000,000	(United States) Leonard Thompson (3)	
May 20	TD Waterhouse Championship	Missouri	1,500,000	(United States) Ed Dougherty (2)	
May 27	Senior PGA Championship	New Jersey	2,000,000	(United States) Tom Watson (3)	Senior major championship
Jun 3	BellSouth Senior Classic	Tennessee	1,600,000	(United States) Sammy Rachels (1)	
Jun 10	NFL Golf Classic	New Jersey	1,200,000	(United States) John Schroeder (1)	
Jun 17	Instinet Classic	New Jersey	1,500,000	(United States) Gil Morgan (20)	
Jun 24	FleetBoston Classic	Massachusetts	1,400,000	(United States) Larry Nelson (14)	
Jul 1	U.S. Senior Open	Massachusetts	2,400,000	(United States) Bruce Fleisher (14)	Senior major championship
Jul 8	Farmers Charity Classic	Michigan	1,400,000	(United States) Larry Nelson (15)	
Jul 15	Ford Senior Players Championship	Michigan	2,400,000	(United States) Allen Doyle (6)	Senior PGA Tour major championship
Jul 22	SBC Senior Open	Illinois	1,400,000	(United States) Dana Quigley (5)	
Jul 29	Senior British Open	Northern Ireland	£500,000	(Australia) Ian Stanley (n/a)	Senior major championship (Note: Unofficial money event at the time, but retrospectively counted as an official win.)
Jul 29	State Farm Senior Classic	Maryland	1,450,000	(United States) Allen Doyle (7)	
Aug 5	Lightpath Long Island Classic	New York	1,700,000	(United States) Bobby Wadkins (1)	
Aug 12	3M Championship	Minnesota	1,750,000	(United States) Bruce Lietzke (1)	
Aug 19	Novell Utah Showdown	Utah	1,500,000	(United States) Steve Veriato (1)	
Aug 26	AT&T Canada Senior Open Championship	Canada	1,600,000	(United States) Walter Hall (1)	
Sep 2	Kroger Senior Classic	Ohio	1,500,000	(United States) Jim Thorpe (3)	
Sep 9	Allianz Championship	Iowa	1,750,000	(United States) Jim Thorpe (4)	New tournament
~~Sep 16~~	Vantage Championship	North Carolina	–	Canceled (Note: Canceled due to the September 11 attacks.)	
Sep 23	SAS Championship	North Carolina	1,600,000	(United States) Bruce Lietzke (2)	New tournament
Sep 30	Gold Rush Classic	California	1,300,000	(United States) Tom Kite (3)	
Oct 7	Turtle Bay Championship	Hawaii	1,500,000	(United States) Hale Irwin (32)	
Oct 14	The Transamerica	California	1,300,000	(United States) Sammy Rachels (2)	
Oct 21	SBC Championship	Texas	1,400,000	(United States) Larry Nelson (16)	
Oct 28	Senior Tour Championship	Oklahoma	2,500,000	(United States) Bob Gilder (2)	Tour Championship

=== Unofficial events ===
The following events were sanctioned by the Senior PGA Tour, but did not carry official money, nor were wins official.

Date	Tournament	Location	Purse ($)	Winners	Notes
Nov 18	UBS Warburg Cup	South Carolina	3,000,000	Team USA	New team event
Dec 2	Office Depot Father/Son Challenge	Florida	1,000,000	(United States) Raymond Floyd and son Robert Floyd	Team event

== Charles Schwab Cup ==
The Charles Schwab Cup was based on tournament results during the season, calculated using a points-based system.

Position	Player	Points
1	(United States) Allen Doyle	2,382
2	(United States) Bruce Fleisher	2,166
3	(United States) Hale Irwin	1,959
4	(United States) Larry Nelson	1,930
5	(United States) Gil Morgan	1,640

== Money list ==
The money list was based on prize money won during the season, calculated in U.S. dollars.

Position	Player	Prize money ($)
1	(United States) Allen Doyle	2,553,582
2	(United States) Bruce Fleisher	2,411,543
3	(United States) Hale Irwin	2,147,422
4	(United States) Larry Nelson	2,109,936
5	(United States) Gil Morgan	1,885,871

== Awards ==
Award	Winner	Ref.
Player of the Year (Jack Nicklaus Trophy)	(United States) Allen Doyle	
Rookie of the Year	(United States) Bob Gilder	
Scoring leader (Byron Nelson Award)	(United States) Gil Morgan	
Comeback Player of the Year	(United States) John Schroeder	
