= 1988 Senior PGA Tour =

Golf tour season

1988 Senior PGA Tour season
- Duration: January 14, 1988 – December 4, 1988
- Number of official events: 35
- Most wins: (South Africa) Gary Player (6)
- Money list: (New Zealand) Bob Charles

The 1988 Senior PGA Tour was the ninth season of the Senior PGA Tour, the main professional golf tour in the United States for men aged 50 and over.

== Schedule ==
The following table lists official events during the 1988 season.

Date	Tournament	Location	Purse (US$)	Winner (Note: The number in parentheses after each winner's name is the number of Senior PGA Tour events they had won up to and including that tournament. This information is only shown for Senior PGA Tour members.)	Notes
Jan 17	MONY Senior Tournament of Champions	California	100,000	(United States) Dave Hill (2)	
Feb 14	General Foods PGA Seniors' Championship	Florida	350,000	(South Africa) Gary Player (8)	Senior major championship
Feb 21	GTE Suncoast Classic	Florida	300,000	(United States) Dale Douglass (5)	New tournament
Feb 28	Aetna Challenge	Florida	300,000	(South Africa) Gary Player (9)	New tournament
Mar 6	Vintage Chrysler Invitational	California	320,000	(United States) Orville Moody (5)	
Mar 13	GTE Classic	California	275,000	(South Africa) Harold Henning (2)	
Mar 20	Pointe/Del E. Webb Arizona Classic	Arizona	225,000	(United States) Al Geiberger (4)	
Apr 17	Doug Sanders Kingwood Celebrity Classic	Texas	250,000	(United States) Chi-Chi Rodríguez (11)	New tournament
May 8	Vantage at The Dominion	Texas	250,000	(United States) Billy Casper (7)	
May 15	United Hospitals Classic	Pennsylvania	225,000	(Australia) Bruce Crampton (12)	
May 22	NYNEX/Golf Digest Commemorative	New York	300,000	(New Zealand) Bob Charles (4)	
May 29	Sunwest Bank Charley Pride Senior Golf Classic	New Mexico	250,000	(New Zealand) Bob Charles (5)	
Jun 5	Senior Players Reunion Pro-Am	Texas	250,000	(United States) Orville Moody (6)	Pro-Am
Jun 12	Mazda Senior Tournament Players Championship	Florida	400,000	(United States) Billy Casper (8)	Senior PGA Tour major championship
Jun 19	Northville Long Island Classic	New York	350,000	(United States) Don Bies (1)	New to Senior PGA Tour
Jun 26	Southwestern Bell Classic	Oklahoma	250,000	(South Africa) Gary Player (10)	
Jul 4	Rancho Murieta Senior Gold Rush	California	350,000	(New Zealand) Bob Charles (6)	
Jul 10	GTE Northwest Classic	Washington	300,000	(Australia) Bruce Crampton (13)	
Jul 17	Showdown Classic	Utah	350,000	(United States) Miller Barber (21)	
Jul 23	Newport Cup	Rhode Island	250,000	(United States) Walt Zembriski (1)	
Jul 24	Volvo Seniors' British Open	Scotland	£150,000	(South Africa) Gary Player (11)	Senior major championship (Note: Unofficial money event at the time, but retrospectively counted as an official win.)
Jul 31	Digital Seniors Classic	Massachusetts	300,000	(United States) Chi-Chi Rodríguez (12)	
Aug 8	U.S. Senior Open	Illinois	325,000	(South Africa) Gary Player (12)	Senior major championship
Aug 14	MONY Syracuse Senior Classic	New York	250,000	(United States) Dave Hill (3)	
Aug 21	Greater Grand Rapids Open	Michigan	250,000	(United States) Orville Moody (7)	
Aug 28	Bank One Senior Golf Classic	Kentucky	250,000	(New Zealand) Bob Charles (7)	
Sep 10	GTE North Classic	Indiana	350,000	(South Africa) Gary Player (13)	New tournament
Sep 18	Crestar Classic	Virginia	325,000	(United States) Arnold Palmer (10)	
Sep 25	PaineWebber Invitational	North Carolina	300,000	(United States) Dave Hill (4)	
Oct 2	Pepsi Senior Challenge	Georgia	300,000	(New Zealand) Bob Charles (8)	
Oct 9	Vantage Championship	North Carolina	1,000,000	(United States) Walt Zembriski (2)	
Oct 30	General Tire Las Vegas Classic	Nevada	250,000	(United States) Larry Mowry (3)	
Nov 13	Fairfield Barnett Classic	Florida	225,000	(United States) Miller Barber (22)	
Nov 20	Gus Machado Senior Classic	Florida	300,000	(United States) Lee Elder (8)	
Dec 4	GTE Kaanapali Classic	Hawaii	300,000	(United States) Don Bies (2)	

== Money list ==
The money list was based on prize money won during the season, calculated in U.S. dollars.

Position	Player	Prize money ($)
1	(New Zealand) Bob Charles	533,929
2	(South Africa) Gary Player	435,914
3	(United States) Dave Hill	415,594
4	(United States) Orville Moody	411,859
5	(South Africa) Harold Henning	366,230

== Awards ==
Award	Winner	Ref.
Scoring leader (Byron Nelson Award)	(New Zealand) Bob Charles	
