= 2003 Champions Tour =

Golf tour season

2003 Champions Tour season
- Duration: January 31, 2003 – October 26, 2003
- Number of official events: 31
- Most wins: (United States) Craig Stadler (3)
- Charles Schwab Cup: (United States) Tom Watson
- Money list: (United States) Tom Watson
- Player of the Year: (United States) Tom Watson
- Rookie of the Year: (United States) Craig Stadler

The 2003 Champions Tour was the 24th season of the Champions Tour (formerly the Senior PGA Tour), the main professional golf tour in the United States for men aged 50 and over.

== Schedule ==
The following table lists official events during the 2003 season.

Date	Tournament	Location	Purse (US$)	Winner (Note: The number in parentheses after each winner's name is the number of Champions Tour events they had won up to and including that tournament. This information is only shown for Champions Tour members.)	Notes
Feb 2	MasterCard Championship	Hawaii	1,500,000	(United States) Dana Quigley (8)	
Feb 9	Royal Caribbean Golf Classic	Florida	1,450,000	(Canada) Dave Barr (1)	
Feb 16	ACE Group Classic	Florida	1,600,000	(Argentina) Vicente Fernández (4)	
Feb 23	Verizon Classic	Florida	1,600,000	(United States) Bruce Fleisher (16)	
Mar 9	MasterCard Classic	Mexico	2,000,000	(United States) David Eger (1)	
Mar 16	SBC Classic	California	1,500,000	(United States) Tom Purtzer (1)	
Mar 23	Toshiba Senior Classic	California	1,550,000	(Australia) Rodger Davis (1)	
Apr 20	Emerald Coast Classic	Florida	1,450,000	(United States) Bob Gilder (7)	
Apr 27	Liberty Mutual Legends of Golf	Georgia	3,000,000	(United States) Bruce Lietzke (6)	
May 4	Bruno's Memorial Classic	Alabama	1,400,000	(United States) Tom Jenkins (4)	
May 11	Kinko's Classic of Austin	Texas	1,600,000	(United States) Hale Irwin (37)	New tournament
May 18	Bayer Advantage Celebrity Pro-Am	Missouri	1,600,000	(United States) Jay Sigel (8)	Pro-Am
May 25	Columbus Southern Open	Georgia	1,500,000	(United States) Morris Hatalsky (2)	New tournament
Jun 1	Music City Championship	Tennessee	1,400,000	(United States) Jim Ahern (2)	
Jun 8	Senior PGA Championship	Pennsylvania	2,000,000	(United States) John Jacobs (5)	Senior major championship
Jun 22	Farmers Charity Classic	Michigan	1,500,000	(United States) Doug Tewell (7)	
Jun 29	U.S. Senior Open	Ohio	2,600,000	(United States) Bruce Lietzke (7)	Senior major championship
Jul 13	Ford Senior Players Championship	Michigan	2,500,000	(United States) Craig Stadler (1)	Champions Tour major championship
Jul 27	Senior British Open	Scotland	1,600,000	(United States) Tom Watson (5)	Senior major championship
Aug 3	FleetBoston Classic	Massachusetts	1,500,000	(United States) Allen Doyle (8)	
Aug 10	3M Championship	Minnesota	1,750,000	(United States) Wayne Levi (1)	
Aug 17	Long Island Classic	New York	1,500,000	(United States) Jim Thorpe (6)	
Aug 24	Allianz Championship	Iowa	1,500,000	(United States) Don Pooley (2)	
Aug 31	JELD-WEN Tradition	Oregon	2,200,000	(United States) Tom Watson (6)	Champions Tour major championship
Sep 7	Kroger Classic	Ohio	1,500,000	(United States) Gil Morgan (22)	
Sep 14	Constellation Energy Classic	Maryland	1,500,000	(United States) Larry Nelson (17)	
Sep 21	SAS Championship	North Carolina	1,800,000	(United States) D. A. Weibring (1)	
Sep 28	Greater Hickory Classic at Rock Barn	North Carolina	1,500,000	(United States) Craig Stadler (2)	New tournament
Oct 12	Turtle Bay Championship	Hawaii	1,500,000	(United States) Hale Irwin (38)	
Oct 19	SBC Championship	Texas	1,500,000	(United States) Craig Stadler (3)	
Oct 26	Charles Schwab Cup Championship	California	2,500,000	(United States) Jim Thorpe (7)	Tour Championship

=== Unofficial events ===
The following events were sanctioned by the Champions Tour, but did not carry official money, nor were wins official.

Date	Tournament	Location	Purse ($)	Winners	Notes
Nov 23	UBS Cup	Georgia	3,000,000	Tie ( Team USA retain)	Team event
Dec 7	Office Depot Father/Son Challenge	Florida	1,000,000	(United States) Hale Irwin and son Steve Irwin	Team event

== Charles Schwab Cup ==
The Charles Schwab Cup was based on tournament results during the season, calculated using a points-based system.

Position	Player	Points
1	(United States) Tom Watson	4,751
2	(United States) Jim Thorpe	3,381
3	(United States) Bruce Lietzke	2,867
4	(United States) Tom Kite	2,809
5	(United States) Gil Morgan	2,663

== Money list ==
The money list was based on prize money won during the season, calculated in U.S. dollars.

Position	Player	Prize money ($)
1	(United States) Tom Watson	1,853,108
2	(United States) Jim Thorpe	1,830,306
3	(United States) Gil Morgan	1,620,206
4	(United States) Bruce Lietzke	1,610,826
5	(United States) Hale Irwin	1,607,391

== Awards ==
Award	Winner	Ref.
Player of the Year (Jack Nicklaus Trophy)	(United States) Tom Watson	
Rookie of the Year	(United States) Craig Stadler	
Scoring leader (Byron Nelson Award)	(United States) Tom Watson	
Comeback Player of the Year	(United States) Don Pooley	
