= Tom Wargo =

American professional golfer

Personal information
- Full name: Amos Tom Wargo
- Nationality: United States
- Born: September 16, 1942 (age 84) Marlette, Michigan, U.S.
- Height: 6 ft 0 in (1.83 m)
- Weight: 205 lb (93 kg; 14.6 st)

Career
- Sport: Golf
- Turned professional: 1976
- Current tour: Champions Tour
- Professional wins: 10

Number of wins by tour
- PGA Tour Champions: 5
- European Senior Tour: 1

Best results in major championships
- Masters Tournament: DNP
- PGA Championship: T28: 1992
- U.S. Open: DNP
- The Open Championship: CUT: 1995

Amos Tom Wargo (born September 16, 1942) is an American professional golfer, best known for winning the 1993 PGA Seniors' Championship–one of the major championships on the men's Senior PGA Tour and the 1994 Senior British Open, later also recognized as a senior major championship.

== Early life ==
Wargo was born in Marlette in the heart of "The Thumb" of Michigan, and grew up on a nearby dairy farm. He attended Mayville High School. He did not play golf until he taught himself to play at age 25. Prior to his career as a professional golfer, he had worked as an iron worker, assembly-line autoworker, bartender and fisherman in Alaska.

== Professional career ==
Wargo turned pro in 1976. He spent most of his regular PGA career years as the head club pro at the Greenview GC that he owned until 2009 in Centralia, Illinois. In 1992, he received the PGA Club Professional-of-the-Year award. Wargo played in only a handful of PGA Tour events. His best finish in a PGA Tour event, which was a major championship, was a T-28 at the 1992 PGA Championship.

After reaching the age of 50, Wargo joined the Senior PGA Tour in 1993. He has five victories including two senior major championships and over 100 top-10 finishes in this venue. He lives in Centralia, Illinois.

== Professional wins (10) ==
=== Other wins (5) ===
- 1988 Illinois PGA Section Championship
- 1990 Gateway PGA Sectional Championship, Irvin Cobb Championship
- 1991 PGA Club Professional Winter Stroke Play Championship, Gateway PGA Sectional Championship

=== Senior PGA Tour wins (5) ===
Legend
Senior major championships (2)
Other Senior PGA Tour (3)

No.	Date	Tournament	Winning score	Margin of victory	Runner(s)-up
1	Apr 18, 1993	PGA Seniors' Championship	−13 (69-69-67-70=275)	Playoff	(Australia) Bruce Crampton
2	Mar 27, 1994	Doug Sanders Celebrity Classic	−7 (71-66-72=209)	1 stroke	(United States) Bob Murphy
3	Jul 23, 1994	Senior British Open	−8 (73-68-68-71=280)	2 strokes	(New Zealand) Bob Charles, (United States) Doug Dalziel
4	Jun 22, 1995	Dallas Reunion Pro-Am	−13 (64-64-69=197)	7 strokes	(United States) Dave Eichelberger, (United States) Dave Stockton
5	Feb 27, 2000	LiquidGolf.com Invitational	−14 (65-69-68=202)	Playoff	(United States) Gary McCord, (United States) J. C. Snead

Senior PGA Tour playoff record (2–2)

No.	Year	Tournament	Opponent(s)	Result
1	1993	PGA Seniors' Championship	(Australia) Bruce Crampton	Won with par on second extra hole
2	1995	Emerald Coast Classic	(United States) Raymond Floyd	Lost to birdie on third extra hole
3	1996	Bell Atlantic Classic	(United States) Dale Douglass, (United States) John Schroeder	Douglass won with birdie on third extra hole
4	2000	LiquidGolf.com Invitational	(United States) Gary McCord, (United States) J. C. Snead	Won with birdie on third extra hole Snead eliminated by par on first hole

== Results in major championships ==
Tournament	1987	1988	1989	1990	1991	1992	1993	1994	1995
The Open Championship									CUT
PGA Championship	CUT	CUT			CUT	T28	T31		

Note: Wargo only played in The Open Championship and the PGA Championship.

Did not play

CUT = missed the half-way cut
"T" = tied

== Senior major championships ==
=== Wins (2) ===
Year	Championship	Winning score	Margin	Runner(s)-up
1993	PGA Seniors' Championship	−13 (69-69-67-70=275)	Playoff^{1}	(Australia) Bruce Crampton
1994	Senior British Open	−8 (73-68-68-71=280)	2 strokes	(New Zealand) Bob Charles, (United States) Doug Dalziel

^{1}Defeated Crampton with par on second extra hole.

== U.S. national team appearances ==
- PGA Cup: 1988 (winners), 1992 (winners)
