= Tom Jenkins (golfer) =

American professional golfer (born 1947)

Personal information
- Full name: Thomas Wayne Jenkins
- Nationality: United States
- Born: December 14, 1947 (age 78) Houston, Texas, U.S.
- Height: 5 ft 11 in (1.80 m)
- Weight: 190 lb (86 kg; 14 st)

Career
- Sport: Golf
- College: University of Houston
- Turned professional: 1971
- Current tour: PGA Tour Champions
- Former tour: PGA Tour
- Professional wins: 8

Number of wins by tour
- PGA Tour: 1
- PGA Tour Champions: 7

Best results in major championships
- Masters Tournament: CUT: 1976
- PGA Championship: T17: 1974
- U.S. Open: T26: 1976
- The Open Championship: DNP

Achievements and awards
- Senior PGA Tour Comeback Player of the Year: 1999

Thomas Wayne Jenkins (born December 14, 1947) is an American professional golfer.

== Career ==
Jenkins was born in Houston, Texas. He attended the University of Houston where he was a member of the NCAA University Division championship team in 1970, led by John Mahaffey. He graduated in 1971 and turned professional. His sole PGA Tour victory was the IVB-Philadelphia Golf Classic in 1975, with the final two rounds played on Monday. With seven wins in his eleven years and more than $12 million in prize money, Jenkins is currently in the top-10 on the all time money list for the PGA Tour Champions.

Prior to joining the senior tour, Jenkins was the lead instructor for several years at Dave Pelz's short game schools.

== Professional wins (8) ==
=== PGA Tour wins (1) ===
No.	Date	Tournament	Winning score	To par	Margin of victory	Runner-up
1	Jun 16, 1975	IVB-Philadelphia Golf Classic	69-65-69-72=275	−9	1 stroke	(United States) Johnny Miller

PGA Tour playoff record (0–1)

No.	Year	Tournament	Opponents	Result
1	1981	Wickes-Andy Williams San Diego Open	(United States) Raymond Floyd, (United States) Bruce Lietzke	Lietzke won with birdie on second extra hole Jenkins eliminated by par on first hole

=== Champions Tour wins (7) ===
No.	Date	Tournament	Winning score	To par	Margin of victory	Runner(s)-up
1	May 23, 1999	Bell Atlantic Classic	70-67-69=206	−10	Playoff	(United States) Jim Thorpe
2	Aug 13, 2000	AT&T Canada Senior Open Championship	68-68-70-68=274	−14	1 stroke	(United States) Kermit Zarley
3	Jul 7, 2002	AT&T Canada Senior Open Championship (2)	63-68-64=195	−21	3 strokes	(United States) Morris Hatalsky, (United States) Bruce Lietzke, (United States) Walter Morgan
4	May 4, 2003	Bruno's Memorial Classic	67-66-67=200	−16	3 strokes	(United States) Bruce Fleisher
5	Apr 18, 2004	Blue Angels Classic	68-65-63=196	−14	5 strokes	(Australia) Rodger Davis
6	Jun 5, 2005	Allianz Championship	65-72-67=204	−9	Playoff	(United States) D. A. Weibring
7	Oct 8, 2006	SAS Championship	68-66=134 (Note: Shortened to 36 holes due to weather.)	−10	1 stroke	(United States) Chip Beck, (United States) Loren Roberts

Champions Tour playoff record (2–4)

No.	Year	Tournament	Opponent(s)	Result
1	1999	Bell Atlantic Classic	(United States) Jim Thorpe	Won with birdie on first extra hole
2	2001	Kroger Senior Classic	(United States) Jim Thorpe	Lost to birdie on first extra hole
3	2002	Kroger Senior Classic	(United States) Bob Gilder	Lost to birdie on second extra hole
4	2005	Allianz Championship	(United States) D. A. Weibring	Won with birdie on second extra hole
5	2006	Commerce Bank Championship	(United States) John Harris	Lost to birdie on first extra hole
6	2008	ACE Group Classic	(United States) Brad Bryant, (United States) Scott Hoch, (United States) Tom Kite	Hoch won with birdie on first extra hole

== See also ==
- 1972 PGA Tour Qualifying School graduates
