= Bob Eastwood =

American professional golfer (born 1946)

Personal information
- Full name: Robert Fred Eastwood
- Nationality: United States
- Born: February 9, 1946 (age 80) Providence, Rhode Island, U.S.
- Height: 5 ft 10 in (1.78 m)
- Weight: 185 lb (84 kg; 13.2 st)

Career
- Sport: Golf
- College: San Joaquin Delta CC; San Jose State University
- Turned professional: 1969
- Former tours: PGA Tour; Champions Tour
- Professional wins: 10

Number of wins by tour
- PGA Tour: 3
- PGA Tour Champions: 2
- Other: 5

Best results in major championships
- Masters Tournament: 60th: 1985
- PGA Championship: T30: 1980
- U.S. Open: T14: 1987
- The Open Championship: DNP

Robert Fred Eastwood (born February 9, 1946) is an American professional golfer who has won numerous amateur and professional tournaments.

== Early life and amateur career ==
Eastwood was born in Providence, Rhode Island, but spent most of his youth in north-central California. He started playing golf at age 4 as a result of his father being in the golf business. He helped his family construct Dry Creek Ranch Golf Club near Sacramento in the 1960s.

During the 1960s, Eastwood served in the Army and was stationed in Korea. During this same decade he also attended San Joaquin Delta Community College and San Jose State University in San Jose, California. He won several amateur tournaments in the middle 1960s.

== Professional career ==
In 1969, Eastwood turned pro. He has had a streaky career in amateur and professional golf. His three wins on the PGA Tour came during a 15-month period in the mid-1980s. Likewise, his two wins on the Champions Tour both came in the same year, 1997. He has also had long dry spells with no victories and few top-10 finishes. His best finish in a major was a T-14 at the 1987 U.S. Open.

== Personal life ==
Eastwood lives in Fort Worth, Texas. He enjoys hunting and fishing in his spare time.

== Amateur wins ==
- 1965 (2) Sacramento City Amateur Championship, Stockton City Championship
- 1966 (2) California State Amateur, Stockton City Championship
- 1968 (1) West Coast Athletic Conference Championship (individual)

== Professional wins (10) ==
=== PGA Tour wins (3) ===
No.	Date	Tournament	Winning score	Margin of victory	Runner(s)-up
1	Mar 25, 1984	USF&G Classic	−16 (66-68-68-70=272)	3 strokes	(United States) Larry Rinker
2	Aug 5, 1984	Danny Thomas Memphis Classic	−8 (71-69-68-72=280)	2 strokes	(United States) Ralph Landrum, (United States) Mark O'Meara, (United States) Tim Simpson
3	May 12, 1985	Byron Nelson Golf Classic	−8 (69-66-70-67=272)	Playoff	(United States) Payne Stewart

PGA Tour playoff record (1–0)

No.	Year	Tournament	Opponent	Result
1	1985	Byron Nelson Golf Classic	(United States) Payne Stewart	Won with bogey on first extra hole

=== Canadian Tour wins (2) ===
- 1979 (1) Windsor Charity Classic
- 1980 (1) Windsor Charity Classic

=== Other wins (3) ===
- 1973 (1) Mini-Kemper Open
- 1976 (1) Little Bing Crosby
- 1981 (1) Hassan II Golf Trophy

=== Senior PGA Tour wins (2) ===
No.	Date	Tournament	Winning score	Margin of victory	Runners-up
1	May 25, 1997	Bell Atlantic Classic	−5 (66-69=135) (Note: Shortened to 36 holes due to weather.)	1 stroke	(South Africa) John Bland, (United States) Bob E. Smith
2	Oct 26, 1997	Raley's Gold Rush Classic	−12 (67-69-68=204)	2 strokes	(United States) Rick Acton

Senior PGA Tour playoff record (0–1)

No.	Year	Tournament	Opponents	Result
1	1996	Emerald Coast Classic	(Australia) David Graham, (United States) Mike Hill, (United States) Dave Stockton, (United States) Lee Trevino	Trevino won with birdie on first extra hole

== Results in major championships ==
Tournament	1980	1981	1982	1983	1984	1985	1986	1987	1988
Masters Tournament					CUT	60	CUT		CUT
U.S. Open		CUT		64	CUT	T61		T14	T21
PGA Championship	T30	T33	CUT	T82	CUT	CUT			CUT

Note: Eastwood never played in The Open Championship.

Did not play

CUT = missed the half-way cut
"T" = tied

== Results in The Players Championship ==
Tournament	1974	1975	1976	1977	1978	1979	1980	1981	1982	1983	1984	1985	1986	1987	1988	1989	1990	1991
The Players Championship	T58	T64	T74	T28	T52	T60	T39	CUT	T19	2	T62	CUT	CUT	T54	T34	CUT	CUT	T20

Top 10

CUT = missed the halfway cut
"T" indicates a tie for a place

== See also ==
- Spring 1969 PGA Tour Qualifying School graduates
- 1989 PGA Tour Qualifying School graduates
