= Joe Jimenez =

American professional golfer (1926–2007)

Personal information
- Nationality: United States
- Born: June 10, 1926 Kerrville, Texas, U.S.
- Died: August 11, 2007 (aged 81) San Antonio, Texas, U.S.

Career
- Sport: Golf
- College: Trinity University
- Status: Professional
- Former tours: PGA Tour; Champions Tour
- Professional wins: 12

Best results in major championships
- Masters Tournament: DNP
- PGA Championship: T65: 1970
- U.S. Open: T45: 1958
- The Open Championship: CUT: 1978

Joe Jimenez (June 10, 1926 – August 11, 2007) was an American professional golfer, best known for winning the 1978 PGA Seniors' Championship.

== Early life and education ==
Jimenez, who was of Mexican American descent, was born in Kerrville, Texas. He was a 1952 graduate of Trinity University with majors in biology and physical education.

== Professional career ==
Jimenez played on the PGA Tour in the 1950s, 1960s and 1970s. He spent many years (1964–1991) as the club pro at the Jefferson City Country Club in Jefferson City, Missouri. His best showing in a major championship was a T-45 at the 1958 U.S. Open. The highlight of his career came when he won the 1978 PGA Seniors' Championship in a playoff over Manuel de la Torre and Joe Cheves with a birdie on the first extra hole of a sudden-death playoff.

Jimenez holds or formerly held two of golf's "shoot below your age" records. At the 1991 GTE Northwest Classic, a Senior PGA Tour event, 65-year-old Jimenez became the youngest player to shoot his age or lower in a tournament on one of golf's major professional circuits by shooting a 63. This record was later broken when 61-year-old Walter Morgan shot a 60 in the AT&T Canada Senior Open Championship. Jimenez still holds the most-strokes-below-age (7) record. He shot a 62 during the 1995 Ameritech Senior Open at the age of 69.

Since 1974, the Jefferson City Country Club has hosted a tournament in his honor, the Joe Jimenez Invitational. He holds several Georgia-Pacific Grand Champions records.

== Death ==
Jiminez died at his home in San Antonio, Texas from renal failure brought on by lung cancer. He was 81 years old.

== Tournament wins ==
this list is incomplete

- Midwest PGA Championship – year unknown
- Gateway PGA Championship – twice
- South Central PGA Championship – once
- Missouri Open
- 1960 Puerto Rico Open
- 1962 Midwest PGA Championship
- 1978 PGA Seniors' Championship, World Senior Championship
- 1998 Liberty Mutual Legends of Golf – Demaret Division (with Charlie Sifford)
- 1999 Liberty Mutual Legends of Golf – Demaret Division (with Charlie Sifford)
- 2000 Liberty Mutual Legends of Golf – Demaret Division (with Charlie Sifford)
