= Dave Eichelberger =

American professional golfer

Personal information
- Full name: Martin Davis Eichelberger Jr.
- Nationality: United States
- Born: September 3, 1943 (age 83) Waco, Texas, U.S.
- Height: 6 ft 1 in (1.85 m)
- Weight: 195 lb (88 kg; 13.9 st)
- Children: 4

Career
- Sport: Golf
- College: Oklahoma State University
- Turned professional: 1966
- Former tours: PGA Tour; Champions Tour
- Professional wins: 12

Number of wins by tour
- PGA Tour: 4
- PGA Tour Champions: 6
- Other: 1 (regular); 1 (senior)

Best results in major championships
- Masters Tournament: T20: 1971
- PGA Championship: T34: 1971
- U.S. Open: T19: 1971
- The Open Championship: DNP

Achievements and awards
- Senior PGA Tour Comeback Player of the Year: 1994

Martin Davis Eichelberger Jr. (born September 3, 1943) is an American professional golfer who has won several tournaments at both the PGA Tour and Champions Tour levels.

== Early life and amateur career ==
Eichelberger was born in Waco, Texas. He started in the game at the age of 13 in the junior programs at his family's golf club in Waco. He attended Oklahoma State University in Stillwater, Oklahoma; and while there blossomed into an outstanding amateur. He led the Oklahoma State Cowboys to the 1963 NCAA Championship. He graduated in 1965.

== Professional career ==
Eichelberger turned pro in 1966. He has twelve professional victories four of which came on the PGA Tour, plus six Senior PGA Tour triumphs. In 1971, he finished 9th on the PGA Tour money list.

Eichelberger made 784 PGA Tour starts, as of February 2022, 4th most in the history of the tour, and made the cut in 457 of them. Only Mark Brooks, Jay Haas and Davis Love III had more starts.

In addition, Eichelberger added 456 cuts made in 476 starts on the PGA Tour Champions. On his way to a win at the 2002 Emerald Coast Classic, Eichelberger made a hole-in-one from 185 yards at the par 3 eighth hole during the first round of play.

== Personal life ==
Although he is a native Texan, Eichelberger lived most of his adult life in New Canaan, Connecticut. In 2003, he moved to Honolulu, Hawaii, where he lives today with his wife, son and daughter – fraternal twins.

== Professional wins (12) ==
=== PGA Tour wins (4) ===
No.	Date	Tournament	Winning score	Margin of victory	Runner(s)-up
1	Jul 11, 1971	Greater Milwaukee Open	−14 (64-70-68-68=270)	1 stroke	(Australia) Bob Shaw
2	Jul 3, 1977	Greater Milwaukee Open (2)	−10 (71-68-69-70=278)	2 strokes	(United States) Morris Hatalsky, (United States) Gary McCord, (United States) Mike Morley
3	Mar 2, 1980	Bay Hill Classic	−5 (69-66-70-74=279)	3 strokes	(United States) Leonard Thompson
4	Apr 19, 1981	Tallahassee Open	−17 (66-66-69-70=271)	Playoff	(United States) Bob Murphy, (United States) Mark O'Meara

PGA Tour playoff record (1–1)

No.	Year	Tournament	Opponents	Result
1	1971	Greater Greensboro Open	(United States) Buddy Allin, (United States) Rod Funseth	Allin won with birdie on first extra hole
2	1981	Tallahassee Open	(United States) Bob Murphy, (United States) Mark O'Meara	Won with birdie on first extra hole

=== Other wins (1) ===
- 1979 JCPenney Mixed Team Classic (with Murle Breer)

=== Senior PGA Tour wins (6) ===
Legend
Senior major championships (1)
Other Senior PGA Tour (5)

No.	Date	Tournament	Winning score	Margin of victory	Runner(s)-up
1	Sep 11, 1994	Quicksilver Classic	−7 (71-67-71=209)	2 strokes	(United States) Homero Blancas, (United States) Raymond Floyd
2	Aug 4, 1996	VFW Senior Championship	−10 (64-68-68=200)	2 strokes	(United States) Jim Colbert
3	Oct 12, 1997	The Transamerica	−11 (67-68-70=205)	4 strokes	(United States) Frank Conner, (United States) Terry Dill, (United States) John Jacobs, (United States) DeWitt Weaver
4	Jul 11, 1999	U.S. Senior Open	−7 (71-69-73-68=281)	3 strokes	(United States) Ed Dougherty
5	Aug 1, 1999	Novell Utah Showdown	−19 (66-63-69=197)	Playoff	(United States) Dana Quigley
6	Mar 31, 2002	Emerald Coast Classic	−10 (65-65=130) (Note: Shortened to 36 holes due to weather.)	2 strokes	(United States) Doug Tewell

Champions Tour playoff record (1–2)

No.	Year	Tournament	Opponent	Result
1	1994	Raley's Senior Gold Rush	(United States) Bob Murphy	Lost to bogey on fifth extra hole
2	1995	FHP Health Care Classic	(Australia) Bruce Devlin	Lost to birdie on second extra hole
3	1999	Novell Utah Showdown	(United States) Dana Quigley	Won with par on first extra hole

=== Other senior wins (1) ===
- 1994 Diners Club Matches (with Raymond Floyd)

== Results in major championships ==
Tournament	1965	1966	1967	1968	1969
Masters Tournament	CUT	CUT			
U.S. Open				T43	T64
PGA Championship					

Tournament	1970	1971	1972	1973	1974	1975	1976	1977	1978	1979
Masters Tournament		T20	CUT						CUT	
U.S. Open		T19	T29	CUT	T40		T21		59	CUT
PGA Championship		T34	CUT		T71			CUT	T42	

Tournament	1980	1981	1982	1983	1984	1985	1986	1987	1988	1989
Masters Tournament	CUT		CUT							
U.S. Open		CUT					T24	T75		CUT
PGA Championship	T65	CUT	CUT							

Tournament	1990	1991	1992	1993	1994	1995	1996	1997	1998	1999	2000
Masters Tournament											
U.S. Open											T57
PGA Championship											

Note: Eichelberger never played in The Open Championship.

Did not play

CUT = missed the half way cut
"T" indicates a tie for a place.

== Champions Tour major championships ==
=== Wins (1) ===
Year	Championship	Winning score	Margin	Runner-up
1999	U.S. Senior Open	−7 (71-69-73-68=281)	3 strokes	(United States) Ed Dougherty

== U.S. national team appearances ==
Amateur

- Walker Cup: 1965 (tied, cup retained)
- Americas Cup: 1965

== See also ==
- 1966 PGA Tour Qualifying School graduates
- 1986 PGA Tour Qualifying School graduates
- 1987 PGA Tour Qualifying School graduates
