= Gil Morgan =

American professional golfer (born 1946)

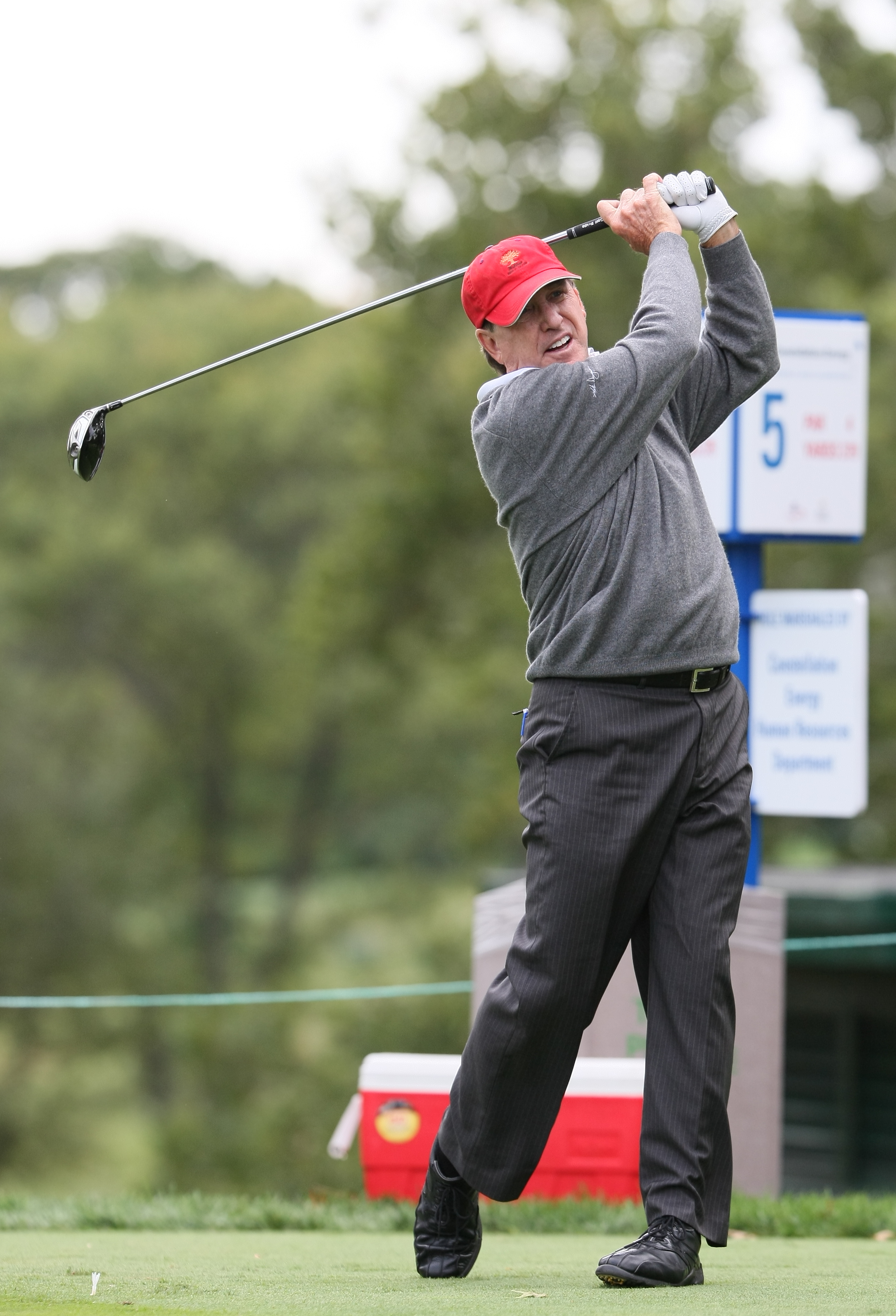
- Morgan in 2009

Personal information
- Full name: Gilmer Bryan Morgan II
- Nickname: Doc
- Nationality: United States
- Born: September 25, 1946 (age 80) Wewoka, Oklahoma, U.S.
- Height: 5 ft 9 in (1.75 m)
- Weight: 170 lb (77 kg; 12 st)

Career
- Sport: Golf
- College: East Central State College; Southern College of Optometry
- Turned professional: 1972
- Former tours: PGA Tour; Champions Tour
- Professional wins: 41
- Highest ranking: 22 (February 3, 1991)

Number of wins by tour
- PGA Tour: 7
- Japan Golf Tour: 1
- PGA Tour Champions: 25 (Tied 4th all time)
- Other: 8

Best results in major championships
- Masters Tournament: T3: 1984
- PGA Championship: 3rd/T3: 1980, 1990
- U.S. Open: 3rd: 1983
- The Open Championship: T10: 1980

Achievements and awards
- Senior PGA Tour Rookie of the Year: 1997
- Senior PGA Tour Byron Nelson Award: 2000, 2001

Gilmer Bryan Morgan II, OD (born September 25, 1946) is an American professional golfer.

== Career ==
Morgan was born in Wewoka, Oklahoma. He graduated from East Central State College in Ada, Oklahoma in 1968.

In 1972, Morgan earned a Doctor of Optometry degree from the Southern College of Optometry in Memphis, Tennessee before turning professional at golf later that year. He is a member of Sigma Tau Gamma fraternity.

Morgan won seven events on the PGA Tour between 1977 and 1990. He posted 21 2nd place and 21 3rd place finishes on the PGA Tour in his career. The most prestigious tournament he won on the PGA Tour was the 1978 World Series of Golf. He also played on the 1979 and 1983 Ryder Cup teams.

Although he never won a major title during his time on the PGA Tour, Morgan showed signs of brilliance. For example, during the 1992 U.S. Open at Pebble Beach, Morgan became the first player to reach 10-under-par (−10) during U.S. Open competition when he recorded a birdie on the third hole during the third round. He later added two more birdies to reach −12 after the seventh hole. He would later finish badly to finish at −4. This was good enough for the 54-hole lead. However, a final round 81 left him +5, in a tie for 13th place and eight shots behind eventual winner Tom Kite Morgan also led the 1976 PGA Championship after 36 holes but finished T8.

He became eligible to play on the Champions Tour in 1996. He has enjoyed much success on the Champion's Tour notching 25 wins. Three of his wins have come in senior majors, namely The Tradition in 1997 and 1998 and the Senior Players Championship in 1998.

== Professional wins (41) ==
=== PGA Tour wins (7) ===
No.	Date	Tournament	Winning score	Margin of victory	Runner(s)-up
1	Sep 11, 1977	B.C. Open	−14 (67-65-69-69=270)	5 strokes	(United States) Lee Elder
2	Feb 19, 1978	Glen Campbell-Los Angeles Open	−6 (66-69-73-70=278)	2 strokes	(United States) Jack Nicklaus
3	Oct 1, 1978	World Series of Golf	−2 (71-72-67-68=278)	Playoff	(United States) Hubert Green
4	Jul 1, 1979	Danny Thomas Memphis Classic	−10 (72-71-69-66=278)	Playoff	(United States) Larry Nelson
5	Jan 9, 1983	Joe Garagiola-Tucson Open	−9 (65-71-68-67=271)	Playoff	(United States) Curtis Strange, (United States) Lanny Wadkins
6	Jan 16, 1983	Glen Campbell-Los Angeles Open (2)	−14 (71-68-63-68=270)	2 strokes	(United States) Lanny Wadkins
7	Jun 3, 1990	Kemper Open	−10 (68-67-70-69=274)	1 stroke	(Australia) Ian Baker-Finch

PGA Tour playoff record (3–4)

No.	Year	Tournament	Opponent(s)	Result
1	1978	World Series of Golf	(United States) Hubert Green	Won with par on first extra hole
2	1979	Danny Thomas Memphis Classic	(United States) Larry Nelson	Won with birdie on second extra hole
3	1980	Pleasant Valley Jimmy Fund Classic	(United States) Wayne Levi	Lost to par on fourth extra hole
4	1981	Buick Open	(United States) Bobby Clampett, (United States) Hale Irwin, (United States) Peter Jacobsen	Irwin won with birdie on second extra hole
5	1983	Joe Garagiola-Tucson Open	(United States) Curtis Strange, (United States) Lanny Wadkins	Won with birdie on second extra hole
6	1983	Kemper Open	(Taiwan) Chen Tze-chung, (United States) Fred Couples, (United States) Barry Jaeckel, (United States) Scott Simpson	Couples won with birdie on second extra hole Jaeckel eliminated by par on first hole
7	1990	Independent Insurance Agent Open	(United States) Tony Sills	Lost to par on first extra hole

=== PGA of Japan Tour wins (1) ===
No.	Date	Tournament	Winning score	Margin of victory	Runner-up
1	Oct 8, 1978	Sumitomo Visa Taiheiyo Masters	−11 (68-67-68-70=273)	3 strokes	(United States) Jerry Pate

=== Other wins (4) ===
- 1979 Heublein Open (Brazil)
- 1981 Oklahoma Open
- 1983 Jerry Ford Invitational (tie with Don Pooley)
- 1997 Oklahoma Open

=== Champions Tour wins (25) ===
Legend
Champions Tour major championships (3)
Tour Championships (1)
Other Champions Tour (21)

No.	Date	Tournament	Winning score	Margin of victory	Runner(s)-up
1	Oct 6, 1996	Ralphs Senior Classic	−11 (68-68-66=202)	1 stroke	(United States) Jim Colbert, (United States) Chi-Chi Rodríguez
2	Apr 6, 1997	The Tradition	−22 (66-66-67-67=266)	6 strokes	(Japan) Isao Aoki
3	Jun 1, 1997	Ameritech Senior Open	−6 (67-69-74=210)	1 stroke	(United States) Hale Irwin
4	Jun 8, 1997	BellSouth Senior Classic	−14 (69-66-67=202)	2 strokes	(South Africa) John Bland
5	Aug 17, 1997	First of America Classic	−9 (69-67-71=207)	1 stroke	(United States) Bob Duval
6	Nov 2, 1997	Ralphs Senior Classic (2)	−15 (67-66-65=198)	1 stroke	(United States) George Archer
7	Nov 9, 1997	Energizer Senior Tour Championship	−16 (69-66-66-71=272)	2 strokes	(United States) Hale Irwin
8	Jan 18, 1998	MasterCard Championship	−21 (65-66-64=195)	6 strokes	(United States) Gibby Gilbert, (United States) Hale Irwin
9	Feb 8, 1998	LG Championship	−6 (69-73-68=210)	2 strokes	(United States) Dale Douglass, (United States) Raymond Floyd
10	Apr 5, 1998	The Tradition (2)	−12 (71-66-69-70=276)	2 strokes	(United States) Tom Wargo
11	Jul 12, 1998	Ford Senior Players Championship	−21 (69-64-68-66=267)	3 strokes	(United States) Hale Irwin
12	Aug 2, 1998	Utah Showdown	−16 (66-67-67=200)	4 strokes	(Japan) Isao Aoki, (United States) John Mahaffey
13	Oct 4, 1998	Vantage Championship	−12 (66-67-65=198)	1 stroke	(United States) Hale Irwin
14	Sep 12, 1999	Comfort Classic	−15 (67-65-69=201)	2 strokes	(United States) Ed Dougherty
15	Sep 26, 1999	Kroger Senior Classic	−18 (67-68-63=198)	2 strokes	(United States) Ed Dougherty
16	Mar 26, 2000	Emerald Coast Classic	−13 (65-65-67=197)	4 strokes	(United States) Larry Nelson
17	Jul 23, 2000	Instinet Classic	−17 (67-66-66=199)	4 strokes	(United States) Bruce Fleisher, (United States) Bob Murphy
18	Sep 10, 2000	Comfort Classic (2)	−13 (64-67=131) (Note: Shortened to 36 holes due to weather.)	1 stroke	(United States) Jim Ahern
19	Feb 11, 2001	ACE Group Classic (2)	−12 (71-67-66=204)	2 strokes	(United States) Dana Quigley
20	Jun 17, 2001	Instinet Classic (2)	−15 (63-69-69=201)	2 strokes	(United States) Tom Jenkins, (United States) J. C. Snead
21	Jun 16, 2002	BellSouth Senior Classic (2)	−14 (67-68-67=202)	3 strokes	(United States) Bruce Fleisher, (United States) Mike McCullough, (United States) Dana Quigley
22	Sep 7, 2003	Kroger Classic (2)	−16 (65-67-68=200)	2 strokes	(United States) Doug Tewell
23	Mar 14, 2004	SBC Classic (3)	−14 (67-66-69=202)	2 strokes	(United States) Larry Nelson
24	Jun 4, 2006	Allianz Championship	−16 (66-64-67=197)	1 stroke	(United States) Loren Roberts
25	Sep 2, 2007	Wal-Mart First Tee Open at Pebble Beach	−14 (70-65-67=202)	2 strokes	(United States) Hale Irwin

Champions Tour playoff record (0–6)

No.	Year	Tournament	Opponent(s)	Result
1	1997	Emerald Coast Classic	(Japan) Isao Aoki	Lost to par on second extra hole
2	2000	Bruno's Memorial Classic	(United States) John Jacobs	Lost to par on first extra hole
3	2000	Vantage Championship	(United States) Jim Dent, (United States) Larry Nelson	Nelson won with birdie on sixth extra hole Dent eliminated by birdie on first hole
4	2001	Toshiba Senior Classic	(Spain) José María Cañizares	Lost to birdie on ninth extra hole
5	2005	Bayer Advantage Classic	(United States) Dana Quigley, (United States) Tom Watson	Quigley won with birdie on first extra hole
6	2007	Boeing Classic	(United States) R. W. Eaks, (United States) David Eger, (Japan) Naomichi Ozaki, (United States) Dana Quigley, (United States) Craig Stadler, (Zimbabwe) Denis Watson	Watson won with eagle on second extra hole Eger, Ozaki, Morgan and Quigley eliminated by birdie on first hole

=== Other senior wins (4) ===
- 1997 Diners Club Matches (with Jay Sigel)
- 1998 Senior Slam at Los Cabos,
- 1999 Senior Slam at Los Cabos, Liberty Mutual Legends of Golf (with Hubert Green)

== Playoff record ==
European Tour playoff record (0–1)

No.	Year	Tournament	Opponents	Result
1	1978	European Open	(Scotland) Bernard Gallacher, (United States) Bobby Wadkins	Wadkins won with birdie on first extra hole

== Results in major championships ==
Tournament	1975	1976	1977	1978	1979
Masters Tournament			CUT	T18	T31
U.S. Open			T41	CUT	CUT
The Open Championship					CUT
PGA Championship	T17	T8	T15	T4	T28

Tournament	1980	1981	1982	1983	1984	1985	1986	1987	1988	1989
Masters Tournament	T19	T21	CUT	T8	T3	CUT				
U.S. Open	T16	CUT	T22	3	T21	T23		T51	CUT	WD
The Open Championship	T10		CUT		T22					
PGA Championship	T3	T19	T22	T55	CUT	T28	CUT	T21	CUT	CUT

Tournament	1990	1991	1992	1993	1994	1995	1996
Masters Tournament		CUT		T50	CUT		
U.S. Open	T56	CUT	T13	CUT	CUT		
The Open Championship		T64		T14	CUT		
PGA Championship	3	T16	T21	CUT	T39	T31	T41

Top 10
Did not play

CUT = missed the half-way cut (3rd round cut in 1979 and 1982 Open Championships)
WD = withdrew
"T" = tied

=== Summary ===
Tournament	Wins	2nd	3rd	Top-5	Top-10	Top-25	Events	Cuts made
Masters Tournament	0	0	1	1	2	5	12	7
U.S. Open	0	0	1	1	1	6	17	9
The Open Championship	0	0	0	0	1	3	7	4
PGA Championship	0	0	2	3	4	11	22	17
Totals	0	0	4	5	8	25	58	37

- Most consecutive cuts made – 7 (1982 PGA – 1984 Open Championship)
- Longest streak of top-10s – 2 (twice)

== Results in The Players Championship ==
Tournament	1974	1975	1976	1977	1978	1979	1980	1981	1982	1983	1984	1985	1986	1987	1988	1989	1990	1991	1992	1993	1994	1995	1996	1997
The Players Championship	T58	CUT	T65	T40	T20	T12	T31	T12	T47	T23	T44	CUT	T58		T6	T6	CUT	CUT	CUT	T3		T68	T13	T53

Top 10
Did not play

CUT = missed the halfway cut
"T" indicates a tie for a place

== Champions Tour major championships ==
=== Wins (3) ===
Year	Championship	Winning score	Margin	Runner(s)-up
1997	The Tradition	−22 (66-66-67-67=266)	6 strokes	(Japan) Isao Aoki
1998	The Tradition (2)	−12 (71-66-69-70=276)	2 strokes	(United States) Tom Wargo
1998	Ford Senior Players Championship	−21 (69-64-68-66=267)	3 strokes	(United States) Hale Irwin

== U.S. national team appearances ==
Professional

- Ryder Cup: 1979 (winners), 1983 (winners)
- Wendy's 3-Tour Challenge (representing Senior PGA Tour): 1998 (winners)

== See also ==
- 1973 PGA Tour Qualifying School graduates.
- List of golfers with most PGA Tour Champions wins
- List of golfers with most Champions Tour major championship wins
