= Joe Inman =

American professional golfer (born 1947)

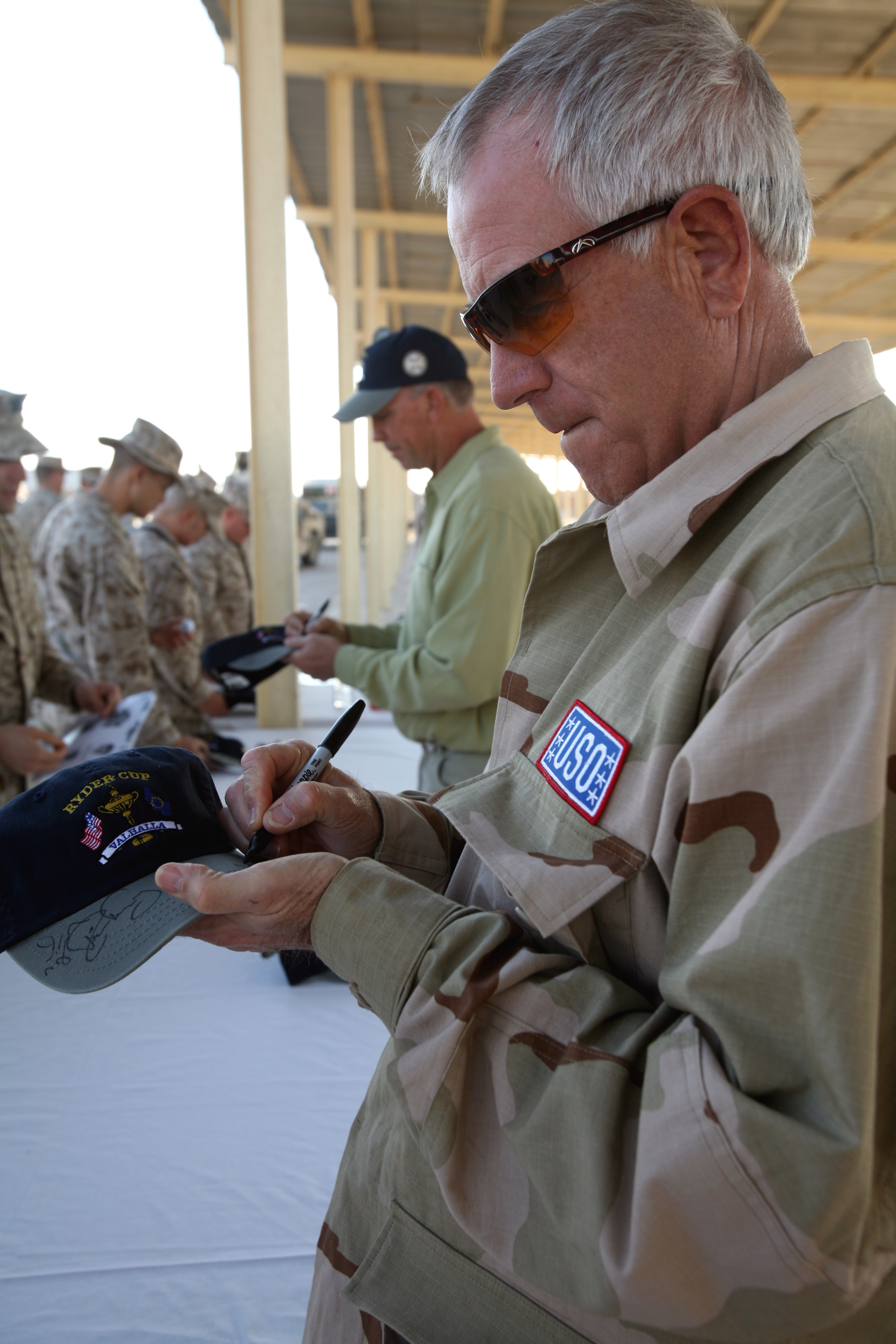
- Inman in 2007

Personal information
- Full name: Joseph Cooper Inman Jr.
- Nationality: United States
- Born: November 29, 1947 (age 78) Indianapolis, Indiana, U.S.
- Height: 5 ft 11 in (1.80 m)
- Weight: 165 lb (75 kg; 11.8 st)

Career
- Sport: Golf
- College: Wake Forest University
- Turned professional: 1972
- Former tours: PGA Tour; Champions Tour
- Professional wins: 5

Number of wins by tour
- PGA Tour: 1
- PGA Tour Champions: 3

Best results in major championships
- Masters Tournament: T9: 1978
- PGA Championship: 11th/T11: 1977, 1978
- U.S. Open: T12: 1978
- The Open Championship: CUT: 1982

Achievements and awards
- Senior PGA Tour Rookie of the Year: 1998
- Wake Forest Sports Hall of Fame: 2002
- Georgia Golf Hall of Fame: 2017

Joseph Cooper Inman Jr. (born November 29, 1947) is an American professional golfer who played on the PGA Tour and the Champions Tour. Inman was the head men's golf coach at Georgia State University from 2008 to 2019.

== Early life ==
Inman was born in Indianapolis, Indiana in 1947 to Joseph Cooper Inman Sr. and Donna (née Dewees) Inman. Inman grew up in Greensboro, North Carolina and graduated from Grimsley High School in 1965. He is the eldest of six children. His younger brother, John, was a two-time winner on the PGA Tour and 1984 NCAA Champion.

== Amateur career ==
Inman attended Wake Forest University in Winston-Salem, North Carolina and was a member of the men's golf team where they won three Atlantic Coast Conference titles from 1967 to 1969. Inman placed third at the 1968 NCAA Division I men’s golf championship and won the Arnold Palmer Award. He was a three-time All-American, earning first-team honors in 1969. Inman was a member of the winning 1969 Walker Cup team and was invited to play in the 1970 Masters Tournament as an amateur. He graduated in 1970.

== Professional career ==
In 1972, Inman turned professional. Inman attempted to make the PGA Tour at 1972 PGA Tour Qualifying School. However, he was unsuccessful. The following year, however, he was successful at 1973 PGA Tour Qualifying School.

Inman played on the PGA Tour from 1974 to 1986. He made the top 60 in the money list in his first year, 1974, the barometer to determine full-time exemption. He won one event during this phase of his career, the 1976 Kemper Open. His best finish in a major was T-9 at The Masters in 1978. After he retired from the PGA Tour, he worked as a sales representative for Ping from 1989 to 1997; he became eligible for the Champions Tour upon reaching the age of 50 in November 1997.

Inman spent his regular PGA Tour years largely toiling in relative obscurity, but immediately became one of the stars on the Champions Tour by winning the 1998 Pacific Bell Senior Classic in his first year. He won the event three years in a row (it was called the SBC Classic the third year), and became only the fifth player in Champions Tour history to three-peat an event. He won the 1998 Senior Tour Rookie of the Year award. Inman has over 4.2 million dollars in Champions Tour career earnings.

Inman became the head coach for the Georgia State University men's golf team in 2008.

== Personal life ==
Inman married his wife Nancy Craig in 1972, and they live in Marietta, Georgia. He is a member of Atlanta Country Club. They have three children who all attended Wake Forest University.

== Amateur wins ==
- 1969 North and South Amateur
- 1970 North Carolina Amateur

== Professional wins (5) ==
=== PGA Tour wins (1) ===
No.	Date	Tournament	Winning score	Margin of victory	Runners-up
1	Jun 13, 1976	Kemper Open	−11 (70-69-67-71=277)	1 stroke	(United States) Grier Jones, (United States) Tom Weiskopf

=== Other wins (1) ===
- 1968 Carolinas Open (as an amateur)

=== Senior PGA Tour wins (3) ===
No.	Date	Tournament	Winning score	Margin of victory	Runner(s)-up
1	Nov 1, 1998	Pacific Bell Senior Classic	−14 (66-68-68=202)	1 stroke	(United States) Lee Trevino
2	Oct 31, 1999	Pacific Bell Senior Classic (2)	−14 (68-66-65=199)	2 strokes	(United States) Dave Stockton, (United States) Bruce Summerhays
3	Oct 29, 2000	SBC Senior Classic (3)	−15 (65-68-65=198)	3 strokes	(United States) Larry Nelson

Senior PGA Tour playoff record (0–1)

No.	Year	Tournament	Opponent	Result
1	1999	Cadillac NFL Golf Classic	(United States) Allen Doyle	Lost to birdie on fourth extra hole

== Results in major championships ==
Tournament	1970	1971	1972	1973	1974	1975	1976	1977	1978	1979	1980	1981	1982	1983	1984	1985	1986
Masters Tournament	CUT						36	CUT	T9	T23	T33	CUT					
U.S. Open						T14	T23	T16	T12	T53	T16		CUT	CUT	CUT		CUT
The Open Championship													CUT				
PGA Championship						CUT	T22	T11	11	CUT	T17	T19	CUT		T59		

Top 10
Did not play

CUT = missed the half-way cut
"T" = tied

== U.S. national team appearances ==
Amateur

- Walker Cup: 1969 (winners)

== See also ==
- 1973 PGA Tour Qualifying School graduates
