= TPC River's Bend =

American private golf club

- Location in the United States
- 39.361434°N 84.22523°W

Club information
- Location: Maineville, Ohio
- Established: 2001
- Type: Private
- Operator: Arcis Golf
- Total holes: 18
- Tournaments: Chiquita Classic (2010–2012); Kroger Classic (2002–2004); Kroger Queen City Championship (2024–present)
- Website: https://www.riversbendcc.com/
- Designed by: Arnold Palmer
- Par: 72
- Length: 7,180 yards
- Course rating: 74.9
- Slope rating: 142

TPC River's Bend is a private golf club located in Maineville, Ohio about 25 miles northeast of Cincinnati.

The Arnold Palmer-designed championship golf course opened in 2001, and is a licensed member of the Tournament Players Club Network. It is owned by Dallas-based Arcis Golf, which purchased the facility from the PGA Tour in December 2022; it is one of nearly 70 Arcis-owned courses in the U.S.

The par-72, 7,180-yard course meanders through corridors of mature hardwoods, creeks, and waterfalls, and features gentle elevation changes. Water comes into play on six holes. The course also has a 12-acre PGA Tour-caliber practice facility, which includes multiple tees as well as a short-game practice area for chipping and putting.

The 30,000+ square-foot clubhouse includes casual and upscale dining rooms, conference rooms with audio-visual and conferencing capabilities, banquet facilities, golf shop, and fully appointed men’s and women’s locker rooms.

The property is located near a bend in the Little Miami River, Ohio's first designated as a National and Wild Scenic River by the National Park Service. It is an Arcis Golf sister course of Four Bridges Country Club in Liberty Township, a private facility 15 minutes from TPC at River's Bend.

Between 2002 and 2004, TPC at River's Bend was the venue for the Kroger Classic, an annual tournament on the Champions Tour featuring winners Bob Gilder, Gil Morgan, and Bruce Summerhays. From 2010 to 2012, it hosted the Chiquita Classic on the Web.com Tour.

In 2024, TPC at River's Bend became the venue for the Kroger Queen City Championship, an annual tournament on the LPGA Tour.

== Scorecard ==
TPC River’s Bend
Tee	Rating/Slope	1	2	3	4	5	6	7	8	9	Out	10	11	12	13	14	15	16	17	18	In	Total
Black	74.9 / 142	442	405	436	344	189	568	158	553	431	3526	388	537	191	428	461	470	213	422	544	3654	7180
Blue	72.4 / 138	415	375	412	315	165	543	138	524	408	3295	369	479	168	400	434	424	207	410	529	3420	6715
White	70.1 / 132	384	342	335	287	150	517	120	496	366	2997	349	457	144	363	410	378	165	369	477	3112	6109
Gold	67.5 / 127	332	342	279	287	150	517	120	452	366	2845	349	423	144	328	271	378	134	369	375	2771	5616
Green	69.8 / 128	332	279	279	204	117	376	90	452	313	2442	302	423	110	328	271	320	134	314	375	2577	5019
SI	Men’s	5	13	9	11	17	1	15	3	7		14	4	18	8	2	6	16	10	12
SI	Women’s	5	15	9	7	13	11	17	1	3		14	6	16	2	10	8	18	4	12
Par		4	4	4	4	3	5	3	5	4	36	4	5	3	4	4	4	3	4	5	36	72
