= Jasna Polana =

Estate in Princeton, New Jersey, United States of America

Coordinates: 40.335°N 74.692°W

TPC Jasna Polana
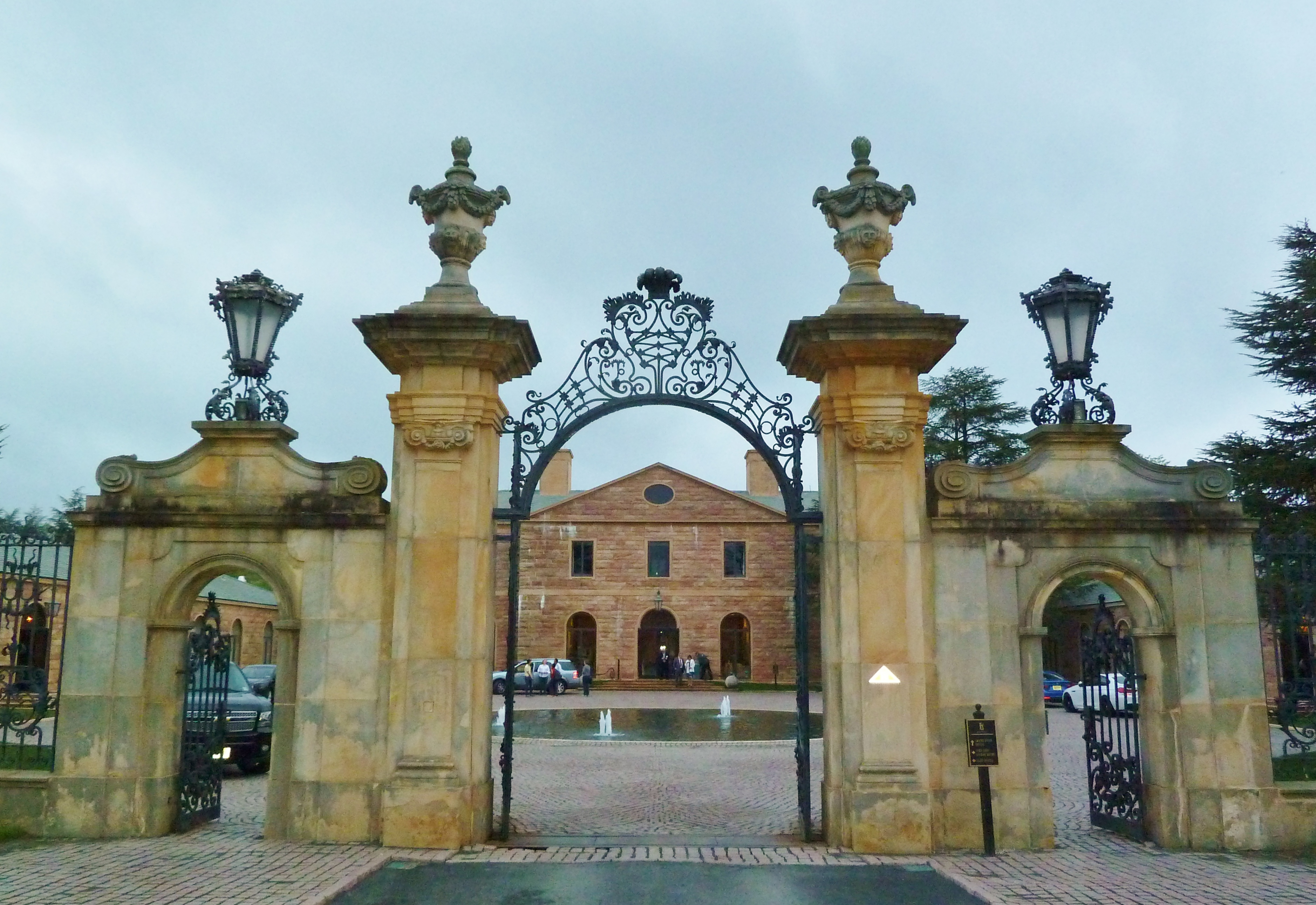
- Gate and mansion
- Interactive map of TPC Jasna Polana

Club information
- Location: Princeton, New Jersey, United States
- Established: 1998
- Type: Private
- Operator: PGA Tour, TPC Network
- Tota holes: 18
- Tournaments: The Instinet Classic
- Website: tpc.com/jasnapolana
- Designed by: Gary Player
- Par: 72
- Length: 7,098 yards
- Course rating: 74.8

Jasna Polana (pronounced yasna; meaning "bright glade" in Polish and "echoing the name of Lev Tolstoy's Russian home") is the former 226-acre estate of John Seward Johnson I and his third wife, Barbara Piasecka Johnson. It is located at 4519 Province Line Road in Princeton, New Jersey. In 1998, Jasna Polana became a private country club.

== The mansion ==
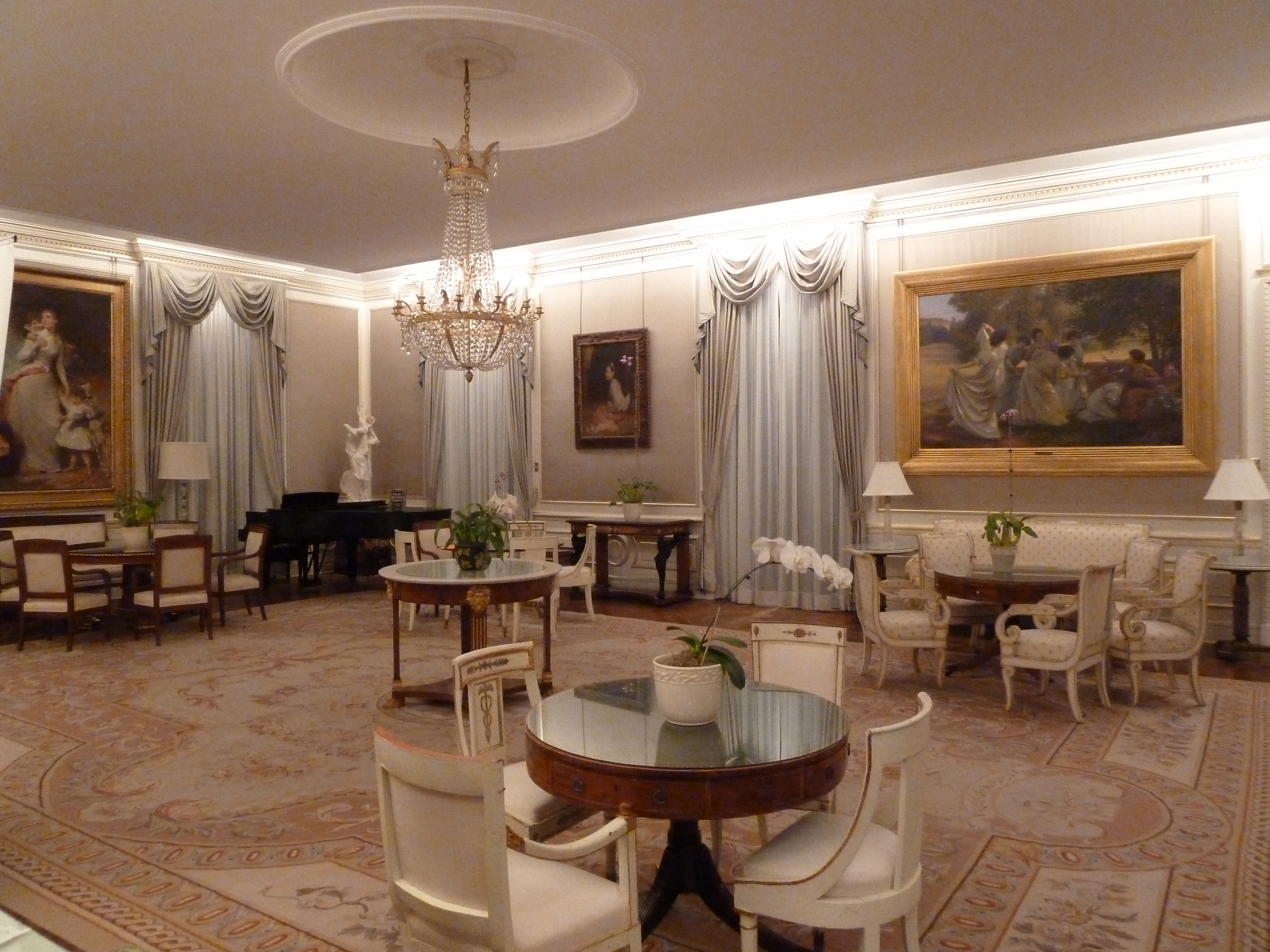
Inside the mansion, 2014

The Jasna Polana mansion was designed by Wallace K. Harrison in a neoclassical style. It has a U-shape with the main building and two wings. The courtyard is enclosed and can be entered through a magnificent portal. The mansion was built in the 1970s at a cost of about $30 million.

Barbara Piasecka Johnson was a Polish-born art historian whose collections of antique furniture and paintings filled the house. After her husband's death in 1983, she spent more time in Europe, and new plans for the estate needed to be developed.

== TPC Jasna Polana ==
In 1996, plans were approved to convert the grounds into a golf course. The Gary Player designed TPC Jasna Polana opened two years later, with the estate's main residence having been converted for use as the clubhouse and restaurant, and some other buildings on the estate being used as boarding facilities.

The championship golf course is a member of the Tournament Players Club network operated by the PGA Tour. Between 2000 and 2002 it hosted The Instinet Classic on the Champions Tour. In 1999, it hosted an edition of Shell's Wonderful World of Golf in which Tom Watson defeated Hale Irwin.

== Tournaments hosted ==
| Year | Tournament | Winner |
|---|---|---|
| 2000 | The Instinet Classic | Gil Morgan |
| 2001 | The Instinet Classic | Gil Morgan |
| 2002 | The Instinet Classic | Isao Aoki |
