= Bob Duval =

American professional golfer (born 1946)

Personal information
- Full name: Robert Duval
- Nationality: United States
- Born: October 9, 1946 (age 80) Schenectady, New York, U.S.
- Spouses: Diane Poole (divorced); Shari
- Children: 3, including David

Career
- Sport: Golf
- College: Florida State University
- Turned professional: 1968
- Former tours: Golden Bear Tour; Champions Tour
- Professional wins: 2

Number of wins by tour
- PGA Tour Champions: 1
- Other: 1

Robert Duval (born October 9, 1946) is an American professional golfer and is best known for being the father of David Duval, formerly the top-ranked player in the world.

== Early life and amateur career ==
Duval was born in Schenectady, New York, the son of professional golfer Henry '"Hap" Duval, and grew up in upstate New York. His father worked full-time for the United States Post Office Department starting at 4 a.m., then taught or played golf until dark, weather permitting. In order to be around his father, Bob learned to play golf when he was six and the game was also a fit with his competitive nature. He attended Florida State University on a golf scholarship with Hubert Green.

== Professional career ==
Duval did not consider playing on the pro tour; he was hired at Timuquana Country Club in Jacksonville, Florida as an assistant pro in 1968. The following year, he began work at the municipal course in Fernandina Beach for four years. Duval returned to Timuquana as head pro in 1973 and stayed there for 13 years.

=== Senior career ===
As his 50th birthday approached, David encouraged him to join the Senior PGA Tour. Bob stated, "When he told me that he believed in my game, especially after what we had been through, it did a lot for my confidence." Duval played in some "club pro" tournaments to sharpen his game. Jack Nicklaus put together a series of 14 south Florida tournaments called the Golden Bear Tour. The entry fee was $15,000 plus living expenses, and Duval didn't have the money. Shari created a business proposal for individuals to sponsor Bob Duval's tour career. Six friends invested $5,000 each, which would be reimbursed from winnings. Duval won one of the tournaments and was certain he could make it on the tour. His total winnings were $29,000, allowing him to repay the sponsors.

He has about two dozen top-10 finishes including a wire-to-wire win at the 1999 Emerald Coast Classic. His win came on the same day that his son David won The Players Championship on the PGA Tour and ascended to the #1 ranking in the world.

== Personal life ==
In 1968, Duval married Diane Poole. They had three children: Brent (b. 1969), David (b. 1971), and Deirdre (b. 1976). In his childhood Brent developed aplastic anemia. The family sought treatment at Rainbow Babies & Children's Hospital in Cleveland, Ohio, where younger brother David, who was 9, underwent surgery to donate bone marrow. Unfortunately, the transplant was not successful, and Brent died as a result of sepsis on May 17, 1981 at age 12.

Both Bob and Diane used alcohol to numb the emotional pain and their relationship deteriorated. Duval was unable to cope, and moved out of the family home for a year. Counseling enabled him to reunite with his wife and children, and in 1987, he accepted an offer to be golf pro at the Plantation, a new gated, golf community in Ponte Vedra Beach, Florida.

Bob was unhappy in his marriage, so in 1993, he left his family permanently and the divorce was final in 1996. When Duval began seeing Sharon Blum, David stood by his mother, who was deeply depressed. He blamed his father and their relationship diminished. After some time had passed, they began talking again, and David realized that his father was happy. In 1996, Duval married Sharon.

== Bibliography ==
- 2002, Letters to a Young Golfer (Art of Mentoring), by Bob Duval and Carl Vigeland, afterword by David Duval

== Professional wins (2) ==
=== Golden Bear Tour wins (1) ===
No.	Date	Tournament	Winning score	Margin of victory	Runner-up
1	Aug 8, 1996	DME Rangefinder Championship	−14 (69-63-70=202)	3 strokes	(United States) John Nieporte

=== Senior PGA Tour wins (1) ===
No.	Date	Tournament	Winning score	Margin of victory	Runner-up
1	Mar 28, 1999	Emerald Coast Classic	−10 (61-68-71=200)	2 strokes	(United States) Bruce Fleisher

Senior PGA Tour playoff record (0–1)

No.	Year	Tournament	Opponent	Result
1	1997	Pittsburgh Senior Classic	(South Africa) Hugh Baiocchi	Lost to par on sixth extra hole

== See also ==
- List of Florida State Seminoles men's golfers
