= Fred Gibson (golfer) =

American golfer (born 1947)

Personal information
- Nationality: United States
- Born: September 12, 1947 (age 79) Washington, D.C., U.S.

Career
- Sport: Golf
- Turned professional: 1977
- Former tour: Champions Tour
- Professional wins: 2

Number of wins by tour
- PGA Tour Champions: 1

Fred Gibson (born September 12, 1947) is an American professional golfer.

== Career ==
In 1947, Gibson was born in Washington, D.C. In 1977, he turned professional.

Gibson played on the Champions Tour from 1998 to 2004 and has one win, the 1999 Vantage Championship.

== Professional wins (2) ==
=== Other wins (1) ===
- 1996 Tobago Open

=== Senior PGA Tour wins (1) ===
No.	Date	Tournament	Winning score	Margin of victory	Runner-up
1	Oct 3, 1999	Vantage Championship	–15 (69-62-64=195)	3 strokes	(United States) Bruce Fleisher
