= Ed Dougherty =

American professional golfer (born 1947)

Personal information
- Full name: Edward Matthew Dougherty
- Nickname: Doc
- Nationality: United States
- Born: November 4, 1947 (age 78) Chester, Pennsylvania, U.S.
- Height: 6 ft 1 in (1.85 m)
- Weight: 215 lb (98 kg; 15.4 st)

Career
- Sport: Golf
- Turned professional: 1969
- Former tours: PGA Tour; Champions Tour
- Professional wins: 8

Number of wins by tour
- PGA Tour: 1
- PGA Tour Champions: 2
- Other: 5

Best results in major championships
- Masters Tournament: CUT: 1996
- PGA Championship: T22: 1975
- U.S. Open: T51: 1987
- The Open Championship: DNP

Edward Matthew "Doc" Dougherty (born November 4, 1947) is an American professional golfer who has played on the PGA Tour and Champions Tour.

== Early life ==
Dougherty was born in Chester, Pennsylvania. He was drafted into the Army after high school and served a tour of duty in Vietnam. Dougherty developed a serious interest in golf while stationed at Fort Lewis, Washington after returning from Southeast Asia.

== Professional career ==
In 1969, Dougherty turned pro. He had 19 top-10 finishes in PGA Tour events during his career including a win at the Deposit Guaranty Golf Classic in 1995, which one year earlier had become an official event. He had more than one million dollars in earnings during the regular years phase of his career.

In 1998, Dougherty began play on the Senior PGA Tour. With over 5.8 million dollars in official earnings after reaching the age of 50, he has enjoyed a far greater degree of success on the elite senior circuit as compared with his regular career. He received the August 2000 Player of the Month award. In 2001, he had a career best ten top-10 finishes. He shares the Champions Tour record for Best driving accuracy in a 54-hole tournament.

== Personal life ==
Dougherty's personal interests include model trains and classic cars. He maintains residences in Linwood, Pennsylvania and Port St. Lucie, Florida.

== Awards and honors ==
In August 2000, he earned the Senior PGA Tour's Player of the Month award

== Professional wins (8) ==
=== PGA Tour wins (1) ===
No.	Date	Tournament	Winning score	Margin of victory	Runner-up
1	Jul 23, 1995	Deposit Guaranty Golf Classic	−16 (68-68-70-66=272)	2 strokes	(United States) Gil Morgan

PGA Tour playoff record (0–1)

No.	Year	Tournament	Opponents	Result
1	1990	Greater Milwaukee Open	(United States) Jim Gallagher Jr., (United States) Billy Mayfair	Gallagher won with par on first extra hole

=== Other wins (5) ===
- 1975 Philadelphia PGA Championship
- 1980 Philadelphia PGA Championship
- 1983 Philadelphia Open Championship
- 1985 PGA Club Professional Championship
- 1986 Philadelphia PGA Championship

=== Senior PGA Tour wins (2) ===
No.	Date	Tournament	Winning score	Margin of victory	Runners-up
1	Aug 6, 2000	Coldwell Banker Burnet Classic	−19 (65-66-66=197)	2 strokes	(United States) Hale Irwin, (United States) Gil Morgan
2	May 20, 2001	TD Waterhouse Championship	−22 (62-66-66=194)	8 strokes	(South Africa) Hugh Baiocchi, (United States) Walter Morgan, (United States) Dana Quigley

Senior PGA Tour playoff record (0–1)

No.	Year	Tournament	Opponent	Result
1	2001	AT&T Canada Senior Open Championship	(United States) Walter Hall	Lost to par on first extra hole

== Results in major championships ==
Tournament	1975	1976	1977	1978	1979
Masters Tournament					
U.S. Open					
PGA Championship	T22				

Tournament	1980	1981	1982	1983	1984	1985	1986	1987	1988	1989
Masters Tournament										
U.S. Open							CUT	T51	CUT	
PGA Championship						CUT	CUT			

Tournament	1990	1991	1992	1993	1994	1995	1996
Masters Tournament							CUT
U.S. Open	CUT	CUT					
PGA Championship		T43	CUT			T58	

Note: Dougherty never played in The Open Championship.

Did not play

CUT = missed the half-way cut
"T" = tied

== See also ==
- 1986 PGA Tour Qualifying School graduates
- 1989 PGA Tour Qualifying School graduates
