= Buddy Allin =

American professional golfer (1944–2007)

Personal information
- Full name: Brian Thomas Allin
- Nicknames: Bud, Buddy
- Nationality: United States
- Born: October 13, 1944 Bremerton, Washington, U.S.
- Died: March 10, 2007 (aged 62) Hemet, California, U.S.
- Height: 5 ft 8 in (1.73 m)
- Weight: 134 lb (61 kg; 9.6 st)

Career
- Sport: Golf
- College: Brigham Young University
- Turned professional: 1969
- Former tours: PGA Tour; Champions Tour
- Professional wins: 9

Number of wins by tour
- PGA Tour: 5
- PGA Tour of Australasia: 1
- PGA Tour Champions: 1
- Other: 2

Best results in major championships
- Masters Tournament: T15: 1974
- PGA Championship: T10: 1975
- U.S. Open: T10: 1974
- The Open Championship: DNP

Brian Thomas ("Bud" or "Buddy") Allin (October 13, 1944 – March 10, 2007) was an American professional golfer who won five PGA Tour events in the 1970s.

== Early life ==
Allin was born in Bremerton, Washington. He learned to play golf at age 13 while working as a caddie at the Santa Barbara Municipal Golf Course in Santa Barbara, California.

== Amateur career ==
A prodigal player, Allin attended Brigham Young University in Provo, Utah and was a member on the golf team along with Johnny Miller. He served in the Army as an artillery officer during the Vietnam War earning four decorations including the Bronze Star and an Air medal.

== Professional career ==
In 1969, Allin turned pro and qualified for the PGA Tour on his first attempt citing the fact that golf was no "big deal" compared to war.

Allin's first win on the PGA Tour came in 1971 at the Greater Greensboro Open when he defeated Dave Eichelberger and Rod Funseth on the first extra-hole in a playoff. He would win five times in five years between 1971 and 1976. His best season was in 1974 when he won the Doral Ryder Open and the Byron Nelson Classic, which propelled him to a ninth-place finish on the money list. His best finish in a major was a T-10 at the 1974 U.S. Open and the 1975 PGA Championship. He had 3 dozen top-10 finishes in PGA Tour events in his career; his last win came at the 1976 Pleasant Valley Classic.

After reaching the age of 50 in October 1994, Allin began competing on the Senior PGA Tour. He was nominated for Rookie of the Year in 1995, after an outstanding first full season. He also shot a Senior Tour record low round of 61 at the FHP Healthcare Classic that year. His lone Senior tour win came in 1997 at the American Express Invitational where he 2-putted from 60 feet on the 54th hole to win by one stroke over Jim Colbert. He competed five full seasons before electing to leave the tour despite being exempt for the 2000 season. Allin devoted the last years of his life to teaching at the San Diego Golf Academy and authoring his instructional manual, Center-Line, as well as an instructional DVD, Preferences. He lived in Boulder City, Nevada as well as California. He died in Hemet, California at the age of 62 from multiple forms of cancer.

== Professional wins (9) ==
=== PGA Tour wins (5) ===
No.	Date	Tournament	Winning score	Margin of victory	Runner(s)-up
1	Apr 4, 1971	Greater Greensboro Open	−9 (75-64-67-69=275)	Playoff	(United States) Dave Eichelberger, (United States) Rod Funseth
2	Mar 4, 1973	Florida Citrus Open	−23 (66-65-67-67=265)	8 strokes	(United States) Charles Coody
3	Mar 10, 1974	Doral-Eastern Open	−16 (66-71-68-67=272)	1 stroke	(United States) Jerry Heard
4	May 5, 1974	Byron Nelson Golf Classic	−15 (69-69-63-68=269)	4 strokes	(United States) Homero Blancas, (United States) Charles Coody, (United States) Lee Trevino, (United States) Tom Watson
5	Aug 1, 1976	Pleasant Valley Classic	−7 (72-67-68-70=277)	1 stroke	(United States) Ben Crenshaw

PGA Tour playoff record (1–0)

No.	Year	Tournament	Opponents	Result
1	1971	Greater Greensboro Open	(United States) Dave Eichelberger, (United States) Rod Funseth	Won with birdie on first extra hole

=== PGA Tour of Australasia wins (1) ===
No.	Date	Tournament	Winning score	Margin of victory	Runner-up
1	Dec 7, 1980	New Zealand Open	−14 (68-69-70-67=274)	1 stroke	(Republic of Ireland) Eamonn Darcy

=== Other wins (2) ===
- 1970 Utah Open, British Columbia Open

=== Senior PGA Tour wins (1) ===
No.	Date	Tournament	Winning score	Margin of victory	Runner-up
1	Feb 23, 1997	American Express Invitational	−11 (68-68-69=205)	1 stroke	(United States) Jim Colbert

== Results in major championships ==
Tournament	1971	1972	1973	1974	1975	1976	1977	1978	1979	1980
Masters Tournament			CUT	T15	T20	T19	T42			
U.S. Open	CUT	T36	T34	T10	T24					
The Open Championship										
PGA Championship		T53	34		T10	WD	T42			CUT

Top 10
Did not play

WD = withdrew
CUT = missed the half-way cut
"T" = tied

== Results in senior majors ==
Results may not be in chronological order

Tournament	1995	1996	1997	1998	1999
Senior PGA Championship	T39	T4	T15	T18	CUT
U.S. Senior Open	DNP	CUT	T18	DNP	CUT
The Tradition	T45	T43	WD	59	T45
Senior Players Championship	74	T69	T49	T45	T64

DNP = did not play
CUT = missed the halfway cut
WD = withdrew
"T" indicates a tie for a place
Yellow background for top-10.

== See also ==
- 1970 PGA Tour Qualifying School graduates
