= Jay Sigel =

American professional golfer (1943–2025)

Personal information
- Full name: Robert Jay Sigel
- Nationality: United States
- Born: November 13, 1943 Bryn Mawr, Pennsylvania, U.S.
- Died: April 19, 2025 (aged 81) Boca Raton, Florida, U.S.
- Height: 6 ft 1 in (1.85 m)
- Weight: 212 lb (96 kg; 15.1 st)

Career
- Sport: Golf
- College: Wake Forest University
- Turned professional: 1993
- Former tour: Champions Tour
- Professional wins: 20

Number of wins by tour
- PGA Tour Champions: 8
- Other: 12

Best results in major championships
- Masters Tournament: T26: 1980
- PGA Championship: DNP
- U.S. Open: T43: 1984
- The Open Championship: T38: 1980

Achievements and awards
- Bob Jones Award: 1984
- Senior PGA Tour Rookie of the Year: 1994

Robert Jay Sigel (November 13, 1943 – April 19, 2025) was an American professional golfer. He enjoyed one of the more illustrious careers in the history of U.S. amateur golf, before turning pro in 1993 at age 50, when he became a member of the Senior PGA Tour.

== Early life ==
Sigel was born and raised in Bryn Mawr, Pennsylvania. He grew up playing golf at Bala Golf Club and later joined Aronimink Golf Club in Newtown Square, Pennsylvania. As a promising young golfer, he reached the finals of the Junior Boys' Championship of Philadelphia (GAP) in 1959 and 1960.

Sigel attended high school at Lower Merion High School in Lower Merion, Pennsylvania.

== Amateur career ==
Sigel originally attended the University of Houston for a semester before transferring to Wake Forest University. He was a member of the golf team. In 1967, Sigel graduated with a sociology degree.

Throughout the 1970s and 1980s, Sigel was one of America's premier amateur golfers. He compiled victories in the U.S. Amateur, British Amateur and U.S. Mid-Amateur, competed on nine Walker Cup teams, and won numerous other amateur titles. In 1975 he was ranked the #8 amateur in the U.S. by Golf Digest and the following year advanced to #4.

In 1983, he became the only golfer ever to win the U.S. Amateur and U.S. Mid-Amateur in the same year, which made him only the third golfer to win two USGA individual titles in the same year. He was also runner-up in the Canadian Amateur Championship that year. Although he remained an amateur he did occasionally compete in professional events on the PGA Tour. His best finish was tied 18th at the 1979 IVB-Philadelphia Golf Classic. He was the low amateur in the 1980 Open Championship, the 1984 U.S. Open, and the Masters Tournament in 1980, 1981, and 1988.

Sigel was considering a professional golf career while in college, but injured his arm in an accident. He decided on a career in insurance, while competing in high-level amateur golf. Sigel developed his own successful insurance business in the Philadelphia area for over 30 years. He sold the business to Century Business Services, where he was a senior vice president. He was a Chartered Life Underwriter, Chartered Financial Consultant and a qualifying life member of the Million Dollar Round Table. He also sat on the Corporate Advisory Board for the American Cancer Society, and was the president of the Greater Philadelphia Scholastic Golf Association and the First Tee of Philadelphia chapter. He hosted the Annual Jay Sigel Invitational Golf Tournament at his home course, Aronimink Golf Club. The proceeds from this tournament benefit prostate cancer research at the University of Pennsylvania.

== Professional career ==
Sigel turned professional when he reached the age of 50. He joined the Senior PGA Tour in 1994 and won Rookie of the Year honors, when he earned 14 top-10 finishes and secured his first victory at the GTE West Classic. For the next five seasons, he finished in the top-31 on the Senior Tour money list. He won eight events; the last was the 2003 Bayer Advantage Celebrity Pro-Am. In the 2004 Champions Tour season, Sigel finished in the money in all 28 tournaments that he entered and had six top-10 finishes. During the 2005 campaign his best finish was 5th at the Turtle Bay Championship. He has career earnings of over $9 million. Since joining the Champions Tour in 1994, Sigel has been sponsored by Global Management Consulting and technology services company Accenture.

== Personal life and death ==
Sigel was married to Betty. They had three daughters. He resided in Berwyn, Pennsylvania.

Sigel died from pancreatic cancer in Boca Raton, Florida, on April 19, 2025, at the age of 81.

== Awards and honors ==
- In 1984, Sigel was given the Bob Jones Award
- In 1994, Sigel earned the Senior PGA Tour Rookie of the Year

== Amateur wins ==
this list may be incomplete

- 1961 International Jaycee Junior Golf Tournament
- 1962 Pennsylvania Amateur
- 1966 Pennsylvania Amateur
- 1968 Pennsylvania Amateur
- 1972 Pennsylvania Amateur
- 1973 Philadelphia Amateur, Pennsylvania Amateur
- 1974 Pennsylvania Amateur
- 1975 Pennsylvania Amateur, Porter Cup
- 1976 Pennsylvania Amateur, Sunnehanna Amateur
- 1978 Pennsylvania Amateur, Sunnehanna Amateur
- 1979 Pennsylvania Amateur, British Amateur
- 1981 Pennsylvania Amateur, Porter Cup
- 1982 U.S. Amateur
- 1983 U.S. Amateur, U.S. Mid-Amateur
- 1984 Northeast Amateur
- 1985 Northeast Amateur, U.S. Mid-Amateur
- 1987 Porter Cup, U.S. Mid-Amateur, Philadelphia Amateur
- 1988 Sunnehanna Amateur
- 1991 Northeast Amateur

== Professional wins ==
=== Regular career wins (10) ===
this list may be incomplete

- 1974 Pennsylvania Open Championship
- 1975 Philadelphia Open Championship
- 1977 Philadelphia Open Championship
- 1978 Philadelphia Open Championship, Pennsylvania Open Championship
- 1980 Philadelphia Open Championship
- 1983 Pennsylvania Open Championship
- 1986 Philadelphia Open Championship
- 1987 Philadelphia Open Championship
- 1990 Pennsylvania Open Championship

Note: all as an amateur

=== Champions Tour wins (8) ===
Legend
Tour Championships (1)
Other Champions Tour (7)

No.	Date	Tournament	Winning score	To par	Margin of victory	Runner(s)-up
1	Mar 6, 1994	GTE West Classic	70-66-62=198	−12	Playoff	(United States) Jim Colbert
2	Nov 10, 1996	Energizer Senior Tour Championship	69-69-69-72=279	−9	2 strokes	(United States) Kermit Zarley
3	May 4, 1997	Bruno's Memorial Classic	68-67-70=205	−11	3 strokes	(United States) Gil Morgan
4	Jul 6, 1997	Kroger Senior Classic	66-63-66=195	−18	7 strokes	(Japan) Isao Aoki
5	May 24, 1998	Bell Atlantic Classic	74-62-69=205	−11	Playoff	(Spain) José María Cañizares
6	Oct 25, 1998	EMC Kaanapali Classic	61-72-68=201	−12	2 strokes	(South Africa) Hugh Baiocchi, (United States) Larry Laoretti
7	May 26, 2002	Farmers Charity Classic	67-69-67=203	−13	2 strokes	(United States) Morris Hatalsky
8	May 18, 2003	Bayer Advantage Celebrity Pro-Am	72-68-65=205	−11	1 stroke	(United States) Mike McCullough

Champions Tour playoff record (2–2)

No.	Year	Tournament	Opponent	Result
1	1994	GTE West Classic	(United States) Jim Colbert	Won with birdie on fourth extra hole
2	1997	Toshiba Senior Classic	(United States) Bob Murphy	Lost to birdie on ninth extra hole
3	1997	Northville Long Island Classic	(United States) Dana Quigley	Lost to par on third extra hole
4	1998	Bell Atlantic Classic	(Spain) José María Cañizares	Won with birdie on third extra hole

=== Other senior wins (2) ===
- 1997 Diners Club Matches (with Gil Morgan)
- 2006 Georgia-Pacific Grand Champions Championship (unofficial Champions Tour event)

== Results in major championships ==
Tournament	1978	1979	1980	1981	1982	1983	1984	1985	1986	1987	1988	1989
Masters Tournament	CUT	CUT	T26LA	T35LA	CUT	CUT	CUT	T44	CUT	CUT	T39LA	
U.S. Open			CUT			CUT	T43LA	T64				CUT
The Open Championship			T38LA				CUT					

Note: Sigel never played in the PGA Championship

Did not play

LA = Low amateur
CUT = missed the half-way cut
"T" = tied

== U.S. national team appearances ==
Amateur

- Walker Cup: 1977 (winners), 1979 (winners), 1981 (winners), 1983 (winners, playing captain), 1985 (winners, playing captain), 1987 (winners), 1989, 1991 (winners), 1993 (winners)
- Eisenhower Trophy: 1978 (winners), 1980 (winners), 1982 (winners), 1984, 1986, 1988, 1992

== See also ==
- List of people from Pennsylvania
