= NFL Golf Classic =

The NFL Golf Classic was a golf tournament on the Champions Tour from 1993 to 2002. It was played in May or June at the Upper Montclair Country Club in Clifton, New Jersey. It was a joint production with the NFL and attracted top NFL talent to play in a tournament within a tournament (separate from the golf pros). NFL players Trent Dilfer and Al Del Greco frequently played to the top of the leaderboard. The 2000 edition was also the final competitive win for golfing great Lee Trevino. In its day it was amongst the more popular stops of the Champions Tour.

The purse for the 2002 tournament was US$1,300,000, with $195,000 going to the winner. The tournament was founded in 1993 as the Cadillac NFL Golf Classic.

== Winners ==
Year	Player	Country	Score	To par	1st prize ($)	Purse ($)
NFL Golf Classic
2002	James Mason	United States	207	−9	195,000	1,300,000
2001	John Schroeder	United States	207	−9	180,000	1,200,000
Cadillac NFL Golf Classic
2000	Lee Trevino (2)	United States	202	−14	165,000	1,100,000
1999	Allen Doyle	United States	204	−12	165,000	1,100,000
1998	Bob Dickson	United States	207	−9	165,000	1,100,000
1997	Bruce Crampton	Australia	210	−6	150,000	1,000,000
1996	Bob Murphy	United States	202	−14	142,500	950,000
1995	George Archer	United States	205	−11	142,500	950,000
1994	Raymond Floyd	United States	206	−10	135,000	900,000
1993	Lee Trevino	United States	209	−7	127,500	850,000
