= Walter Morgan (golfer) =

American golfer (born 1941)

Personal information
- Full name: Walter T. Morgan
- Nationality: United States
- Born: May 31, 1941 (age 85) Haddock, Georgia, U.S.

Career
- Sport: Golf
- Status: Professional
- Former tour: Champions Tour
- Professional wins: 4

Number of wins by tour
- PGA Tour Champions: 3
- Other: 1

Achievements and awards
- Senior PGA Tour Comeback Player of the Year: 1995

Walter T. Morgan (born May 31, 1941) is an American professional golfer who has played on the Senior PGA Tour.

== Career ==
In 1941, Morgan was born in Haddock, Georgia where he played baseball in his youth. He served 20 years in the United States Army including two tours of duty in Vietnam. He began playing golf at the age of 30 after 10 years in the military. After retiring from the military, Morgan joined the Champions Tour. He played on the tour from 1991 to 2004, winning three times.

Morgan holds or shares several Champions Tour records. He shares the lowest 18-hole round (60), lowest strokes to par score (11), and the record for the largest lead in a tournament after 18 holes with several other golfers. Morgan is also the holder of the youngest golfer to shoot his age or better record. He was eventually forced to retire from the game in 2004 for health reasons due to arthritis in his back and shoulders.

Morgan and his wife, Geraldine, founded a First Tee chapter, The First Tee of Lake Norman Region, a non-profit organization that develops and supports programs promoting life skills and opportunities including the incorporation of junior golf programs for disadvantaged and special needs youth.

== Awards and honors ==
- In 1995, Morgan won the Senior PGA TOUR's Comeback Player of the Year award.
- In September 1995 and March 1996, he was Senior PGA Tour's Player of the Month.
- In 2006, he was bestowed with an African-American Legend of Golf award.

== Professional wins (4) ==
=== Senior PGA Tour wins (3) ===
No.	Date	Tournament	Winning score	Margin of victory	Runner-up
1	Sep 10, 1995	GTE Northwest Classic	−13 (68-69-70=207)	3 strokes	(United States) Dave Stockton
2	Mar 3, 1996	FHP Health Care Classic	−11 (62-71-66=199)	Playoff	(South Africa) Gary Player
3	Jul 28, 1996	Ameritech Senior Open	−11 (63-70-72=205)	2 strokes	(South Africa) John Bland

Senior PGA Tour playoff record (1–0)

No.	Year	Tournament	Opponent	Result
1	1996	FHP Health Care Classic	(South Africa) Gary Player	Won with birdie on first extra hole

=== Other senior wins (1) ===
- 2002 Uniting Fore Care Classic (Georgia-Pacific Grand Champions event)
