= LiquidGolf.com Invitational =

Golf tournament

The LiquidGolf.com Invitational was a golf tournament on the Champions Tour from 1996 to 2000. It was played in Sarasota, Florida at the TPC at Prestancia.

The purse for the 2000 tournament was US$1,200,000, with $180,000 going to the winner. The tournament was founded in 1996 as the American Express Invitational.

== Winners ==
LiquidGolf.com Invitational

- 2000 Tom Wargo

American Express Invitational

- 1999 Bruce Fleisher
- 1998 Larry Nelson
- 1997 Buddy Allin
- 1996 Hale Irwin
