= Pittsburgh Senior Classic =

The Pittsburgh Senior Classic was a golf tournament on the Champions Tour from 1993 to 1998. It was played in the greater Pittsburgh, Pennsylvania area; first in Midway, Pennsylvania at the Quicksilver Golf Club (1993-1997) and then in Sewickley Heights, Pennsylvania at the Sewickley Heights Golf Club.

The purse for the 1998 tournament was US$1,100,000, with $165,000 going to the winner. The tournament was founded in 1993 as the Quicksilver Classic.

== Winners ==
Pittsburgh Senior Classic

- 1998 Larry Nelson
- 1997 Hugh Baiocchi
- 1996 Tom Weiskopf

Quicksilver Classic

- 1995 Dave Stockton
- 1994 Dave Eichelberger
- 1993 Bob Charles
