= FHP Health Care Classic =

The FHP Health Care Classic was a golf tournament on the Champions Tour from 1987 to 1996. It was played in Simi Valley, California at the Wood Ranch Golf Club (1987–1988) and in Ojai, California at the Ojai Valley Inn and Country Club (1989–1996)

The purse for the 1996 tournament was US$800,000, with $120,000 going to the winner. The tournament was founded in 1987 as the GTE Classic.

== Winners ==
FHP Health Care Classic

- 1996 Walter Morgan
- 1995 Bruce Devlin

GTE West Classic

- 1994 Jay Sigel
- 1993 Al Geiberger
- 1992 Bruce Crampton
- 1991 Chi-Chi Rodríguez
- 1989 Walt Zembriski

GTE Classic

- 1988 Harold Henning
- 1987 Bob Charles
