= Comfort Classic =

US golf tournament

The Comfort Classic was a golf tournament on the Champions Tour from 1988 to 2000. It was played in Indianapolis, Indiana, at the Broadmoor Country Club (1988–1993) and at the Brickyard Crossing Golf Club (1994–2000). Title sponsorship was from Comfort Inn.

The purse for the 2000 tournament was US$1,250,000, with $187,500 going to the winner. The tournament was founded in 1988 as the GTE North Classic.

In 2000, the Indianapolis Motor Speedway started hosting the United States Grand Prix, which created an unfavorable tight scheduling conflict with the golf tournament. In addition, competitors had begun voicing complaints about the unchallenging nature of how the course was being set up for tournament play. In December 2000, Comfort Inns ended their sponsorship, and the event was not held again.

== Winners ==
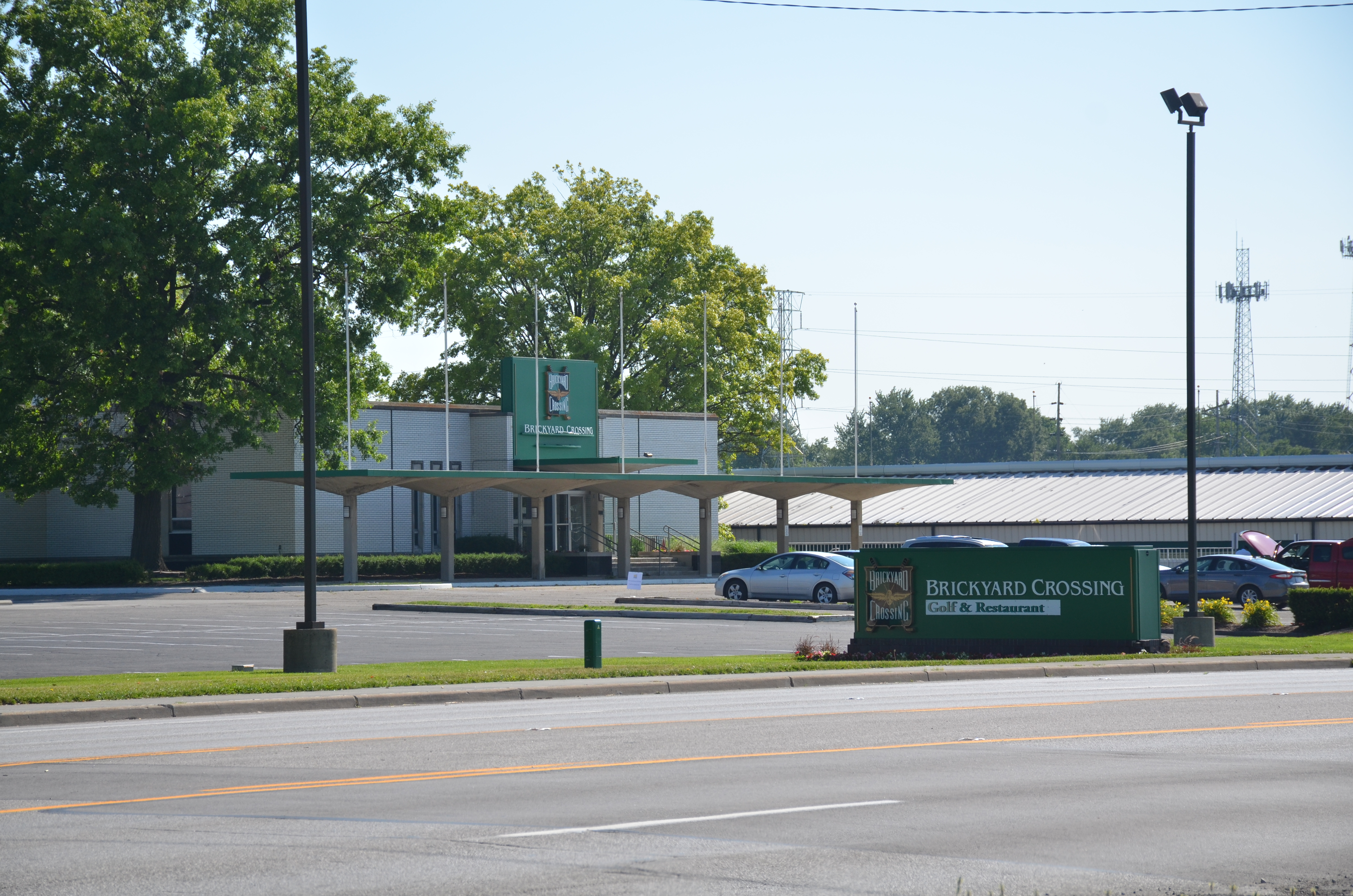
Brickyard Crossing Resort golf course.

Comfort Classic at the Brickyard

- 2000 Gil Morgan
- 1999 Gil Morgan
- 1998 Hugh Baiocchi
- 1997 David Graham

Brickyard Crossing Championship Produced by the Brickyard Foundation

- 1996 Jimmy Powell

Brickyard Crossing Championship

- 1995 Simon Hobday

Brickyard Crossing Championship presented by GTE

- 1994 Isao Aoki

GTE North Classic

- 1993 Bob Murphy
- 1992 Raymond Floyd
- 1991 George Archer
- 1990 Mike Hill
- 1989 Gary Player
- 1988 Gary Player
