= BellSouth Senior Classic =

The BellSouth Senior Classic at Opryland was a golf tournament on the Champions Tour from 1994 to 2003. It was played in Nashville, Tennessee at the Springhouse Golf Club.

In its final year in 2003, the tournament was retitled as the Music City Championship at Gaylord Opryland with a purse of US$1,400,000, of which $210,000 went to the winner.

== Winners ==
Music City Championship

- 2003 Jim Ahern

BellSouth Senior Classic

- 2002 Gil Morgan
- 2001 Sammy Rachels
- 2000 Hale Irwin
- 1999 Bruce Fleisher
- 1998 Isao Aoki
- 1997 Gil Morgan
- 1996 Isao Aoki
- 1995 Jim Dent
- 1994 Lee Trevino
