= SBC Senior Open =

The SBC Senior Open was a golf tournament on the Senior PGA Tour from 1989 to 2002. It was played in several different cities, mostly in the Chicago area.

Years	City	Course
2002	Chicago, Illinois	Harborside International Golf Center
1996-2001	Long Grove, Illinois	Kemper Lakes Golf Club
1991-1995	Aurora, Illinois	Stonebridge Country Club
1990	Acme, Michigan	Grand Traverse Resort & Spa
1989	Beachwood, Ohio	Canterbury Golf Club

The purse for the 2002 tournament was US$1,450,000, with $217,500 going to the winner. The tournament was founded in 1989 as the Ameritech Senior Open.

== Winners ==
- 2002 Bob Gilder
- 2001 Dana Quigley
- 2000 Tom Kite

Ameritech Senior Open

- 1999 Hale Irwin
- 1998 Hale Irwin
- 1997 Gil Morgan
- 1996 Walter Morgan
- 1995 Hale Irwin
- 1994 John Paul Cain
- 1993 George Archer
- 1992 Dale Douglass
- 1991 Mike Hill
- 1990 Chi-Chi Rodríguez
- 1989 Bruce Crampton
