= Kroger Classic =

The Kroger Classic was a golf tournament on the Champions Tour from 1990 to 2004. It was played in Mason, Ohio at the Golf Center at Kings Island (1990–2001) and Maineville, Ohio at the TPC at River's Bend (2002–2004).

The purse for the 2004 tournament was US$1,500,000, with $225,000 going to the winner. The tournament was founded in 1990 as the Kroger Senior Classic.

== Winners ==
- 2004 Bruce Summerhays
- 2003 Gil Morgan

Kroger Senior Classic

- 2002 Bob Gilder
- 2001 Jim Thorpe
- 2000 Hubert Green
- 1999 Gil Morgan
- 1998 Hugh Baiocchi
- 1997 Jay Sigel
- 1996 Isao Aoki
- 1995 Mike Hill
- 1994 Jim Colbert
- 1993 Simon Hobday
- 1992 Gibby Gilbert
- 1991 Al Geiberger
- 1990 Jim Dent
