= Instinet Classic =

The Instinet Classic was a golf tournament on the Champions Tour from 1985 to 2002. It was played in several different cities in Pennsylvania and New Jersey.

The purse for the 2002 tournament was US$1,500,000, with $225,000 going to the winner. The tournament was founded in 1985 as the United Hospitals Senior Golf Championship.

== Tournament locations ==
Years	City	Course
2000–02	Princeton, New Jersey	TPC at Jasna Polana
1998–99	Avondale, Pennsylvania	Hartefeld National Golf club
1992–97	Malvern, Pennsylvania	Chester Valley Golf club
1991	Malvern, Pennsylvania	White Manor Country Club
1985–90	Malvern, Pennsylvania	Chester Valley Golf club

== Winners ==
- 2002 Isao Aoki
- 2001 Gil Morgan
- 2000 Gil Morgan

Bell Atlantic Classic

- 1999 Tom Jenkins
- 1998 Jay Sigel
- 1997 Bob Eastwood
- 1996 Dale Douglass
- 1995 Jim Colbert
- 1994 Lee Trevino
- 1993 Bob Charles
- 1992 Lee Trevino
- 1991 Jim Ferree
- 1990 Dale Douglass

Bell Atlantic/St. Christopher's Classic

- 1989 Dave Hill

United Hospitals Classic

- 1988 Bruce Crampton

United Hospitals Senior Golf Championship

- 1987 Chi-Chi Rodríguez
- 1986 Gary Player
- 1985 Don January
