= Turtle Bay Championship =

Golf tournament (1987–2008)

The Turtle Bay Championship was a golf tournament on the Champions Tour from 1987 to 2008. The tournament was founded in 1987 as the GTE Kaanapali Classic when it was played at Kāʻanapali on the island of Maui.

== History ==
It was played annually in January at the Turtle Bay Resort near Kahuku, Hawaii at The Palmer Course from 2001 through 2008. The purse for the 2008 tournament was US$1,600,000, with $240,000 going to the winner.

== Winners ==
Turtle Bay Championship

- 2008 Jerry Pate
- 2007 Fred Funk
- 2006 Loren Roberts
- 2005 Hale Irwin
- 2004 No tournament
- 2003 Hale Irwin
- 2002 Hale Irwin
- 2001 Hale Irwin

EMC Kaanapali Classic

- 2000 Hale Irwin
- 1999 Bruce Fleisher
- 1998 Jay Sigel

Hyatt Regency Maui Kaanapali Classic

- 1997 Hale Irwin
- 1996 Bob Charles
- 1995 Bob Charles
- 1994 Bob Murphy

Ping Kaanapali Classic

- 1993 George Archer

Kaanapali Classic

- 1992 Tommy Aaron

First Development Kaanapali Classic

- 1991 Jim Colbert

GTE Kaanapali Classic

- 1990 Bob Charles
- 1989 Don Bies
- 1988 Don Bies
- 1987 Orville Moody
