= Emerald Coast Classic (Champions Tour) =

American golf tournament

The Boeing Championship at Sandestin was a golf tournament on the Champions Tour. It was last played in Sandestin, Florida at the Raven Golf Club. Boeing was the main sponsor of the tournament.

The purse for the 2007 tournament was US$1,650,000, with $247,500 going to the winner. The tournament was founded in 1995 as the Emerald Coast Classic. It was last played in 2007.

== Winners ==
Boeing Championship at Sandestin

- 2007 Loren Roberts
- 2006 Bobby Wadkins

Blue Angels Classic

- 2005 Jim Thorpe
- 2004 Tom Jenkins

Emerald Coast Classic

- 2003 Bob Gilder
- 2002 Dave Eichelberger
- 2001 Mike McCullough
- 2000 Gil Morgan
- 1999 Bob Duval
- 1998 Dana Quigley
- 1997 Isao Aoki
- 1996 Lee Trevino
- 1995 Raymond Floyd
