= Greater Kansas City Golf Classic =

The Greater Kansas City Golf Classic was a golf tournament on the Champions Tour from 1987 to 2006. The tournament, which first took place in Oklahoma, was last played in Overland Park, Kansas, at The Nicklaus Golf Club at Lions Gate.

The purse for the 2006 tournament was $1,650,000, with $248,000 going to the winner. The tournament was founded in 1987 as the Silver Pages Classic.

== Winners ==
Greater Kansas City Golf Classic

- 2006 Dana Quigley

Bayer Advantage Classic

- 2005 Dana Quigley

Bayer Advantage Celebrity Pro-Am

- 2004 Allen Doyle
- 2003 Jay Sigel

TD Waterhouse Championship

- 2002 Bruce Lietzke
- 2001 Ed Dougherty
- 2000 Dana Quigley
- 1999 Allen Doyle

Saint Luke's Classic

- 1998 Larry Ziegler
- 1997 Bruce Summerhays

VFW Senior Championship

- 1996 Dave Eichelberger
- 1995 Bob Murphy

Southwestern Bell Classic

- 1994 Jim Colbert
- 1993 Dave Stockton
- 1992 Gibby Gilbert
- 1991 Jim Colbert
- 1990 Jimmy Powell
- 1989 Bobby Nichols
- 1988 Gary Player

Silver Pages Classic

- 1987 Chi-Chi Rodríguez
