= 1994 Senior PGA Tour =

Golf tour season

1994 Senior PGA Tour season
- Duration: January 6, 1994 – November 13, 1994
- Number of official events: 38
- Most wins: (United States) Lee Trevino (6)
- Money list: (United States) Dave Stockton
- Player of the Year: (United States) Lee Trevino
- Rookie of the Year: (United States) Jay Sigel

The 1994 Senior PGA Tour was the 15th season of the Senior PGA Tour, the main professional golf tour in the United States for men aged 50 and over.

== Schedule ==
The following table lists official events during the 1994 season.

Date	Tournament	Location	Purse (US$)	Winner (Note: The number in parentheses after each winner's name is the number of Senior PGA Tour events they had won up to and including that tournament. This information is only shown for Senior PGA Tour members.)	Notes
Jan 9	Mercedes Championships	California	500,000	(United States) Jack Nicklaus (7)	
Feb 6	Royal Caribbean Classic	Florida	800,000	(United States) Lee Trevino (19)	
Feb 13	GTE Suncoast Classic	Florida	700,000	(United States) Rocky Thompson (3)	
Feb 20	IntelliNet Challenge	Florida	500,000	(United States) Mike Hill (16)	
Mar 6	GTE West Classic	California	550,000	(United States) Jay Sigel (1)	
Mar 13	Vantage at The Dominion	Texas	650,000	(United States) Jim Albus (3)	
Mar 27	Doug Sanders Celebrity Classic	Texas	500,000	(United States) Tom Wargo (2)	
Apr 3	The Tradition	Arizona	850,000	(United States) Raymond Floyd (6)	Senior PGA Tour major championship
Apr 17	PGA Seniors' Championship	Florida	800,000	(United States) Lee Trevino (20)	Senior major championship
Apr 24	Dallas Reunion Pro-Am	Texas	500,000	(United States) Larry Gilbert (1)	Pro-Am
May 1	Las Vegas Senior Classic	Nevada	900,000	(United States) Raymond Floyd (7)	
May 15	PaineWebber Invitational	North Carolina	750,000	(United States) Lee Trevino (21)	
May 22	Cadillac NFL Golf Classic	New Jersey	900,000	(United States) Raymond Floyd (8)	
May 29	Bell Atlantic Classic	Pennsylvania	700,000	(United States) Lee Trevino (22)	
Jun 5	Bruno's Memorial Classic	Alabama	1,000,000	(United States) Jim Dent (8)	
Jun 12	Nationwide Championship	Georgia	1,150,000	(United States) Dave Stockton (7)	
Jun 19	BellSouth Senior Classic	Tennessee	1,050,000	(United States) Lee Trevino (23)	
Jun 26	Ford Senior Players Championship	Michigan	1,400,000	(United States) Dave Stockton (8)	Senior PGA Tour major championship
Jul 3	U.S. Senior Open	North Carolina	800,000	(South Africa) Simon Hobday (3)	Senior major championship
Jul 10	Kroger Senior Classic	Ohio	850,000	(United States) Jim Colbert (8)	
Jul 17	Ameritech Senior Open	Illinois	750,000	(United States) John Paul Cain (2)	
Jul 23	Senior British Open	England	£220,000	(United States) Tom Wargo (3)	Senior major championship (Note: Unofficial money event at the time, but retrospectively counted as an official win.)
Jul 24	Southwestern Bell Classic	Missouri	700,000	(United States) Jim Colbert (9)	
Jul 31	Northville Long Island Classic	New York	650,000	(United States) Lee Trevino (24)	
Aug 7	Bank of Boston Senior Golf Classic	Massachusetts	750,000	(United States) Jim Albus (4)	
Aug 14	First of America Classic	Michigan	650,000	(England) Tony Jacklin (1)	
Aug 21	Burnet Senior Classic	Minnesota	1,050,000	(United States) Dave Stockton (9)	
Aug 28	Franklin Quest Championship	Utah	500,000	(United States) Tom Weiskopf (1)	
Sep 4	GTE Northwest Classic	Washington	550,000	(South Africa) Simon Hobday (4)	
Sep 11	Quicksilver Classic	Pennsylvania	1,050,000	(United States) Dave Eichelberger (1)	
Sep 18	Bank One Senior Classic	Kentucky	550,000	(Japan) Isao Aoki (2)	
Sep 25	Brickyard Crossing Championship	Indiana	700,000	(Japan) Isao Aoki (3)	
Oct 2	Vantage Championship	North Carolina	1,500,000	(United States) Larry Gilbert (2)	
Oct 9	The Transamerica	California	600,000	(United States) Kermit Zarley (1)	
Oct 16	Raley's Senior Gold Rush	California	650,000	(United States) Bob Murphy (3)	
Oct 23	Ralphs Senior Classic	California	750,000	(United States) Jack Kiefer (1)	
Oct 30	Hyatt Regency Maui Kaanapali Classic	Hawaii	550,000	(United States) Bob Murphy (4)	
Nov 13	Golf Magazine Senior Tour Championship	South Carolina	1,350,000	(United States) Raymond Floyd (9)	Tour Championship

== Money list ==
The money list was based on prize money won during the season, calculated in U.S. dollars.

Position	Player	Prize money ($)
1	(United States) Dave Stockton	1,402,519
2	(United States) Raymond Floyd	1,382,762
3	(United States) Jim Albus	1,237,128
4	(United States) Lee Trevino	1,202,369
5	(United States) Jim Colbert	1,012,115

== Awards ==
Award	Winner	Ref.
Player of the Year (Jack Nicklaus Trophy)	(United States) Lee Trevino	
Rookie of the Year	(United States) Jay Sigel	
Scoring leader (Byron Nelson Award)	(United States) Raymond Floyd	
Comeback Player of the Year	(United States) Dave Eichelberger	
