= 1993 Senior PGA Tour =

Golf tour season

1993 Senior PGA Tour season
- Duration: January 7, 1993 – December 12, 1993
- Number of official events: 39
- Most wins: (United States) Dave Stockton (5)
- Money list: (United States) Dave Stockton
- Player of the Year: (United States) Dave Stockton
- Rookie of the Year: (United States) Bob Murphy

The 1993 Senior PGA Tour was the 14th season of the Senior PGA Tour, the main professional golf tour in the United States for men aged 50 and over.

== Schedule ==
The following table lists official events during the 1993 season.

Date	Tournament	Location	Purse (US$)	Winner (Note: The number in parentheses after each winner's name is the number of Senior PGA Tour events they had won up to and including that tournament. This information is only shown for Senior PGA Tour members.)	Notes
Jan 10	Infiniti Senior Tournament of Champions	California	350,000	(United States) Al Geiberger (8)	
Feb 7	Royal Caribbean Classic	Florida	750,000	(United States) Jim Colbert (6)	
Feb 14	Better Homes & Gardens Real Estate Challenge	Florida	500,000	(United States) Mike Hill (14)	
Feb 21	GTE Suncoast Classic	Florida	500,000	(United States) Jim Albus (2)	
Mar 7	GTE West Classic	California	500,000	(United States) Al Geiberger (9)	
Mar 14	Vantage at The Dominion	Texas	650,000	(United States) J. C. Snead (1)	
Mar 21	Gulfstream Aerospace Invitational	California	550,000	(United States) Raymond Floyd (4)	
Mar 28	Doug Sanders Celebrity Classic	Texas	500,000	(New Zealand) Bob Charles (20)	
Apr 4	The Tradition	Arizona	850,000	(United States) Tom Shaw (2)	Senior PGA Tour major championship
Apr 18	PGA Seniors' Championship	Florida	800,000	(United States) Tom Wargo (1)	Senior major championship
Apr 25	Muratec Reunion Pro-Am	Texas	500,000	(United States) Dave Stockton (2)	Pro-Am
May 2	Las Vegas Senior Classic	Nevada	700,000	(United States) Gibby Gilbert (4)	
May 16	PaineWebber Invitational	North Carolina	550,000	(United States) Mike Hill (15)	
May 23	Bell Atlantic Classic	Pennsylvania	650,000	(New Zealand) Bob Charles (21)	
May 30	Cadillac NFL Golf Classic	New Jersey	850,000	(United States) Lee Trevino (16)	New tournament
Jun 6	NYNEX Commemorative	New York	550,000	(United States) Bob Wynn (1)	
Jun 13	Southwestern Bell Classic	Missouri	700,000	(United States) Dave Stockton (3)	
Jun 20	Burnet Senior Classic	Minnesota	1,050,000	(United States) Chi-Chi Rodríguez (22)	New tournament
Jun 27	Ford Senior Players Championship	Michigan	1,200,000	(United States) Jim Colbert (7)	Senior PGA Tour major championship
Jul 4	Kroger Senior Classic	Ohio	850,000	(South Africa) Simon Hobday (1)	
Jul 11	U.S. Senior Open	Colorado	700,000	(United States) Jack Nicklaus (6)	Senior major championship
Jul 18	Ameritech Senior Open	Illinois	600,000	(United States) George Archer (12)	
Jul 25	Senior British Open	England	£220,000	(New Zealand) Bob Charles (22)	Senior major championship (Note: Unofficial money event at the time, but retrospectively counted as an official win.)
Jul 25	First of America Classic	Michigan	550,000	(United States) George Archer (13)	
Aug 1	Northville Long Island Classic	New York	550,000	(United States) Raymond Floyd (5)	
Aug 8	Bank of Boston Senior Golf Classic	Massachusetts	750,000	(United States) Bob Betley (1)	
Aug 15	Franklin Quest Championship	Utah	500,000	(United States) Dave Stockton (4)	
Aug 22	GTE Northwest Classic	Washington	500,000	(United States) Dave Stockton (5)	
Aug 29	Bruno's Memorial Classic	Alabama	850,000	(United States) Bob Murphy (1)	
Sep 5	Quicksilver Classic	Pennsylvania	1,050,000	(New Zealand) Bob Charles (23)	New tournament
Sep 12	GTE North Classic	Indiana	500,000	(United States) Bob Murphy (2)	
Sep 19	Bank One Senior Classic	Kentucky	550,000	(South Africa) Gary Player (19)	
Sep 26	Nationwide Championship	Georgia	950,000	(United States) Lee Trevino (17)	
Oct 3	Vantage Championship	North Carolina	1,500,000	(United States) Lee Trevino (18)	
Oct 10	The Transamerica	California	600,000	(United States) Dave Stockton (6)	
Oct 17	Raley's Senior Gold Rush	California	600,000	(United States) George Archer (14)	
Oct 24	Ralphs Senior Classic	California	650,000	(United States) Dale Douglass (10)	
Oct 31	Ping Kaanapali Classic	Hawaii	550,000	(United States) George Archer (15)	
Dec 12	Hyatt Senior Tour Championship	Puerto Rico	1,000,000	(South Africa) Simon Hobday (2)	Tour Championship

== Money list ==
The money list was based on prize money won during the season, calculated in U.S. dollars.

Position	Player	Prize money ($)
1	(United States) Dave Stockton	1,175,944
2	(New Zealand) Bob Charles	1,046,823
3	(United States) George Archer	963,124
4	(United States) Lee Trevino	956,591
5	(United States) Chi-Chi Rodríguez	798,857

== Awards ==
Award	Winner	Ref.
Player of the Year (Jack Nicklaus Trophy)	(United States) Dave Stockton	
Rookie of the Year	(United States) Bob Murphy	
Scoring leader (Byron Nelson Award)	(New Zealand) Bob Charles	
Comeback Player of the Year	(United States) Jim Ferree	
