= 1992 Senior PGA Tour =

Golf tour season

1992 Senior PGA Tour season
- Duration: January 9, 1992 – December 13, 1992
- Number of official events: 37
- Most wins: (United States) Lee Trevino (5)
- Money list: (United States) Lee Trevino
- Player of the Year: (United States) Lee Trevino
- Rookie of the Year: (United States) Dave Stockton

The 1992 Senior PGA Tour was the 13th season of the Senior PGA Tour, the main professional golf tour in the United States for men aged 50 and over.

== Schedule ==
The following table lists official events during the 1992 season.

Date	Tournament	Location	Purse (US$)	Winner (Note: The number in parentheses after each winner's name is the number of Senior PGA Tour events they had won up to and including that tournament. This information is only shown for Senior PGA Tour members.)	Notes
Jan 12	Infiniti Senior Tournament of Champions	California	350,000	(United States) Al Geiberger (7)	
Feb 2	Royal Caribbean Classic	Florida	500,000	(United States) Don Massengale (2)	
Feb 9	Aetna Challenge	Florida	450,000	(United States) Jimmy Powell (2)	
Feb 16	GTE Suncoast Classic	Florida	450,000	(United States) Jim Colbert (4)	
Mar 8	GTE West Classic	California	450,000	(Australia) Bruce Crampton (19)	
Mar 15	Vantage at The Dominion	Texas	400,000	(United States) Lee Trevino (11)	
Mar 22	Vintage ARCO Invitational	California	500,000	(United States) Mike Hill (11)	
Apr 5	The Tradition	Arizona	800,000	(United States) Lee Trevino (12)	Senior PGA Tour major championship
Apr 19	PGA Seniors' Championship	Florida	700,000	(United States) Lee Trevino (13)	Senior major championship
May 3	Las Vegas Senior Classic	Nevada	450,000	(United States) Lee Trevino (14)	
May 10	Murata Reunion Pro-Am	Texas	400,000	(United States) George Archer (9)	Pro-Am
May 17	Doug Sanders Kingwood Celebrity Classic	Texas	350,000	(United States) Mike Hill (12)	
May 24	Bell Atlantic Classic	Pennsylvania	550,000	(United States) Lee Trevino (15)	
May 31	NYNEX Commemorative	New York	400,000	(United States) Dale Douglass (8)	
Jun 7	PaineWebber Invitational	North Carolina	450,000	(United States) Don Bies (6)	
Jun 14	The Senior Players Championship	Michigan	1,000,000	(United States) Dave Stockton (1)	Senior PGA Tour major championship
Jun 28	Southwestern Bell Classic	Missouri	450,000	(United States) Gibby Gilbert (1)	
Jul 5	Kroger Senior Classic	Ohio	600,000	(United States) Gibby Gilbert (2)	
Jul 12	U.S. Senior Open	Pennsylvania	700,000	(United States) Larry Laoretti (1)	Senior major championship
Jul 19	Ameritech Senior Open	Illinois	500,000	(United States) Dale Douglass (9)	
Jul 26	Senior British Open	England	£200,000	(South Africa) John Fourie (n/a)	Senior major championship (Note: Unofficial money event at the time, but retrospectively counted as an official win.)
Jul 26	Newport Cup	Rhode Island	400,000	(United States) Jim Dent (7)	
Aug 2	Northville Long Island Classic	New York	450,000	(United States) George Archer (10)	
Aug 9	Digital Seniors Classic	Massachusetts	500,000	(United States) Mike Hill (13)	
Aug 16	Bruno's Memorial Classic	Alabama	700,000	(United States) George Archer (11)	New tournament
Aug 23	GTE Northwest Classic	Washington	450,000	(United States) Mike Joyce (1)	
Aug 30	Franklin Showdown Classic	Utah	400,000	(United States) Orville Moody (11)	
Sep 6	First of America Classic	Michigan	400,000	(United States) Gibby Gilbert (3)	
Sep 13	Bank One Senior Classic	Kentucky	500,000	(United States) Terry Dill (1)	
Sep 20	GTE North Classic	Indiana	450,000	(United States) Raymond Floyd (1)	
Sep 27	Nationwide Championship	Georgia	800,000	(Japan) Isao Aoki (1)	
Oct 4	Vantage Championship	North Carolina	1,500,000	(United States) Jim Colbert (5)	
Oct 11	Raley's Senior Gold Rush	California	500,000	(New Zealand) Bob Charles (18)	
Oct 18	Transamerica Senior Golf Championship	California	500,000	(New Zealand) Bob Charles (19)	
Oct 25	Ralphs Senior Classic	California	600,000	(United States) Raymond Floyd (2)	
Nov 1	Kaanapali Classic	Hawaii	500,000	(United States) Tommy Aaron (1)	
Nov 8	Ko Olina Senior Invitational	Hawaii	500,000	(United States) Chi-Chi Rodríguez (21)	New tournament
Dec 13	Senior Tour Championship	Puerto Rico	1,000,000	(United States) Raymond Floyd (3)	Tour Championship

== Money list ==
The money list was based on prize money won during the season, calculated in U.S. dollars.

Position	Player	Prize money ($)
1	(United States) Lee Trevino	1,027,002
2	(United States) George Archer	860,175
3	(United States) Jim Colbert	825,768
4	(United States) Mike Hill	802,423
5	(United States) Chi-Chi Rodríguez	711,095

== Awards ==
Award	Winner	Ref.
Player of the Year (Jack Nicklaus Trophy)	(United States) Lee Trevino	
Rookie of the Year	(United States) Dave Stockton	
Scoring leader (Byron Nelson Award)	(United States) Lee Trevino	
Comeback Player of the Year	(United States) Tommy Aaron	
