= 1991 Senior PGA Tour =

Golf tour season

1991 Senior PGA Tour season
- Duration: January 3, 1991 – December 15, 1991
- Number of official events: 38
- Most wins: (United States) Mike Hill (5)
- Money list: (United States) Mike Hill
- Player of the Year: (United States) George Archer and (United States) Mike Hill (shared)
- Rookie of the Year: (United States) Jim Colbert

The 1991 Senior PGA Tour was the 12th season of the Senior PGA Tour, the main professional golf tour in the United States for men aged 50 and over.

== Schedule ==
The following table lists official events during the 1991 season.

| Date | Tournament | Location | Purse (US$) | Winner (Note: The number in parentheses after each winner's name is the number of Senior PGA Tour events they had won up to and including that tournament. This information is only shown for Senior PGA Tour members.) | Notes |
|---|---|---|---|---|---|
| Jan 6 | Infiniti Senior Tournament of Champions | California | 350,000 | (Australia) Bruce Crampton (18) | |
| Feb 3 | Royal Caribbean Classic | Florida | 450,000 | (South Africa) Gary Player (18) | |
| Feb 10 | GTE Suncoast Classic | Florida | 450,000 | (New Zealand) Bob Charles (17) | |
| Feb 17 | Aetna Challenge | Florida | 450,000 | (United States) Lee Trevino (8) | |
| Mar 3 | GTE West Classic | California | 450,000 | (United States) Chi-Chi Rodríguez (17) | |
| Mar 17 | Vantage at The Dominion | Texas | 350,000 | (United States) Lee Trevino (9) | |
| Mar 24 | Vintage ARCO Invitational | California | 500,000 | (United States) Chi-Chi Rodríguez (18) | |
| Apr 7 | The Tradition | Arizona | 800,000 | (United States) Jack Nicklaus (3) | Senior PGA Tour major championship |
| Apr 21 | PGA Seniors' Championship | Florida | 500,000 | (United States) Jack Nicklaus (4) | Senior major championship |
| Apr 28 | Doug Sanders Kingwood Celebrity Classic | Texas | 300,000 | (United States) Mike Hill (6) | |
| May 5 | Las Vegas Senior Classic | Nevada | 450,000 | (United States) Chi-Chi Rodríguez (19) | |
| May 12 | Murata Reunion Pro-Am | Texas | 400,000 | (United States) Chi-Chi Rodríguez (20) | Pro-Am |
| May 26 | Bell Atlantic Classic | Pennsylvania | 550,000 | (United States) Jim Ferree (2) | |
| Jun 2 | NYNEX Commemorative | New York | 400,000 | (United States) Charles Coody (3) | |
| Jun 9 | The Senior Players Championship | Michigan | 1,000,000 | (United States) Jim Albus (1) | Senior PGA Tour major championship |
| Jun 16 | MONY Syracuse Senior Classic | New York | 400,000 | (United States) Rocky Thompson (1) | |
| Jun 23 | PaineWebber Invitational | North Carolina | 450,000 | (United States) Orville Moody (10) | |
| Jun 30 | Southwestern Bell Classic | Missouri | 450,000 | (United States) Jim Colbert (1) | |
| Jul 7 | Kroger Senior Classic | Ohio | 600,000 | (United States) Al Geiberger (6) | |
| Jul 14 | Seniors' British Open | England | £150,000 | (South Africa) Bobby Verwey (n/a) | Senior major championship (Note: Unofficial money event at the time, but retrospectively counted as an official win.) |
| Jul 14 | Newport Cup | Rhode Island | 325,000 | (United States) Larry Ziegler (1) | |
| Jul 21 | Ameritech Senior Open | Illinois | 500,000 | (United States) Mike Hill (7) | |
| Jul 28 | U.S. Senior Open | Michigan | 500,000 | (United States) Jack Nicklaus (5) | Senior major championship |
| Aug 4 | Northville Long Island Classic | New York | 450,000 | (United States) George Archer (6) | |
| Aug 11 | Showdown Classic | Utah | 350,000 | (United States) Dale Douglass (7) | |
| Aug 18 | GTE Northwest Classic | Washington | 400,000 | (United States) Mike Hill (8) | |
| Aug 25 | Sunwest Bank Charley Pride Senior Golf Classic | New Mexico | 350,000 | (United States) Lee Trevino (10) | |
| Sep 1 | GTE North Classic | Indiana | 450,000 | (United States) George Archer (7) | |
| Sep 8 | First of America Classic | Michigan | 350,000 | (South Africa) Harold Henning (3) | |
| Sep 15 | Digital Seniors Classic | Massachusetts | 400,000 | (United States) Rocky Thompson (2) | |
| Sep 22 | Nationwide Championship | Georgia | 700,000 | (United States) Mike Hill (9) | New tournament |
| Sep 29 | Bank One Senior Classic | Kentucky | 300,000 | (United States) DeWitt Weaver (1) | |
| Oct 6 | Vantage Championship | North Carolina | 1,500,000 | (United States) Jim Colbert (2) | |
| Oct 13 | Raley's Senior Gold Rush | California | 450,000 | (United States) George Archer (8) | |
| Oct 20 | Transamerica Senior Golf Championship | California | 500,000 | (United States) Charles Coody (4) | |
| Oct 27 | Security Pacific Senior Classic | California | 500,000 | (United States) John Brodie (1) | |
| Dec 8 | First Development Kaanapali Classic | Hawaii | 600,000 | (United States) Jim Colbert (3) | |
| Dec 15 | New York Life Champions | Puerto Rico | 1,000,000 | (United States) Mike Hill (10) | Tour Championship |

== Money list ==
The money list was based on prize money won during the season, calculated in U.S. dollars.

| Position | Player | Prize money ($) |
|---|---|---|
| 1 | (United States) Mike Hill | 1,065,657 |
| 2 | (United States) George Archer | 963,455 |
| 3 | (United States) Jim Colbert | 880,749 |
| 4 | (United States) Chi-Chi Rodríguez | 794,013 |
| 5 | (United States) Lee Trevino | 723,163 |

== Awards ==
| Award | Winner(s) | Ref. |
|---|---|---|
| Player of the Year (Jack Nicklaus Trophy) (Note: Archer and Hill shared the Player of the Year award.) | (United States) George Archer (United States) Mike Hill | |
| Rookie of the Year | (United States) Jim Colbert | |
| Scoring leader (Byron Nelson Award) | (United States) Lee Trevino | |
| Comeback Player of the Year | (United States) Larry Laoretti | |
