= Mitsubishi Electric Championship at Hualalai =

Coordinates: 19.827°N 155.992°W

Tournament information
- Location: Kaupulehu, Hawaii
- Established: 1984
- Course: Hualalai Golf Course
- Par: 72
- Length: 7,107 yards (6,499 m)
- Tour: PGA Tour Champions
- Format: Stroke play
- Prize fund: US$2,000,000
- Month played: January

Tournament record score
- Aggregate: 54 holes: 191 Loren Roberts (2006); 191 Steven Alker (2024); 72 holes: 279 Bruce Crampton (1991); 279 Jack Nicklaus (1994)
- To par: 54 holes: −25 as above 72 holes: −9 as above

Current champion
- (United States) Stewart Cink

Final champion
- Location in Hawaii

The Mitsubishi Electric Championship at Hualalai is a golf tournament on the PGA Tour Champions in Hawaii, on the Big Island. It is played annually in January at the Hualalai Resort Golf Club in Kaʻūpūlehu in the Kona district, and Mitsubishi Electric is the main sponsor. The field consists of the senior major champions of the last five years and other tournament winners of the last two years, plus a few sponsor invitees.

The purse in 2020 was $1.8 million, with a winner's share of $305,000.

The tournament debuted 42 years ago in 1984 as the senior division within the PGA Tour's MONY Tournament of Champions at LaCosta Resort in Carlsbad, California. The purse was $100,000 and Orville Moody won by seven strokes to take the winner's share of $30,000. It continued as a division of that tournament through 1994, became a separate event in Puerto Rico in 1995, and relocated to Hualalai in 1997.

Beginning in 2018, the tournament went to a Thursday through Saturday schedule.

== Winners ==
Year	Winner	Score	To par	Margin of victory	Runner(s)-up	Purse ($)
Mitsubishi Electric Championship at Hualalai
2026	(United States) Stewart Cink	193	−23	3 strokes	(Argentina) Ángel Cabrera	2,000,000
2025	(South Africa) Ernie Els	198	−18	2 strokes	(Germany) Alex Čejka (Spain) Miguel Ángel Jiménez (Germany) Bernhard Langer	2,000,000
2024	(New Zealand) Steven Alker	191	−25	4 strokes	(United States) Harrison Frazar	2,000,000
2023	(United States) Steve Stricker	193	−23	6 strokes	(New Zealand) Steven Alker (Northern Ireland) Darren Clarke (United States) Ken Tanigawa (Canada) Mike Weir	2,000,000
2022	(Spain) Miguel Ángel Jiménez (3)	199	−17	Playoff	(New Zealand) Steven Alker	2,000,000
2021	(Northern Ireland) Darren Clarke	195	−21	2 strokes	(South Africa) Retief Goosen	1,800,000
2020	(Spain) Miguel Ángel Jiménez (2)	202	−14	Playoff	(United States) Fred Couples (South Africa) Ernie Els	1,800,000
2019	(United States) Tom Lehman	199	−17	1 stroke	(United States) David Toms	1,800,000
2018	(United States) Jerry Kelly	198	−18	1 stroke	(Scotland) Colin Montgomerie	1,800,000
2017	(Germany) Bernhard Langer (3)	129 (Note: Shortened to 36 holes due to weather.)	−15	1 stroke	(United States) Fred Couples	1,800,000
2016	(United States) Duffy Waldorf	198	−18	1 stroke	(United States) Tom Lehman	1,800,000
2015	(Spain) Miguel Ángel Jiménez	199	−17	2 strokes	(Germany) Bernhard Langer	1,800,000
2014	(Germany) Bernhard Langer (2)	194	−22	3 strokes	(United States) Fred Couples (United States) Jeff Sluman	1,800,000
2013	(United States) John Cook (2)	199	−17	Playoff	(South Africa) David Frost	1,800,000
2012	(United States) Dan Forsman	201	−15	2 strokes	(United States) Jay Don Blake	1,800,000
2011	(United States) John Cook	194	−22	2 strokes	(United States) Tom Lehman	1,800,000
2010	(United States) Tom Watson	194	−22	1 stroke	(United States) Fred Couples	1,800,000
2009	(Germany) Bernhard Langer	198	−18	1 stroke	(United States) Andy Bean	1,800,000
MasterCard Championship
2008	(United States) Fred Funk	195	−21	2 strokes	(United States) Allen Doyle	1,800,000
2007	(United States) Hale Irwin (2)	193	−23	5 strokes	(United States) Tom Kite	1,700,000
2006	(United States) Loren Roberts	191	−25	1 stroke	(United States) Don Pooley	1,700,000
2005	(United States) Dana Quigley (2)	198	−18	Playoff	(United States) Tom Watson	1,600,000
2004	(United States) Fuzzy Zoeller	196	−20	1 stroke	(United States) Dana Quigley	1,600,000
2003	(United States) Dana Quigley	198	−18	2 strokes	(United States) Larry Nelson	1,600,000
2002	(United States) Tom Kite	199	−17	6 strokes	(United States) John Jacobs	1,500,000
2001	(United States) Larry Nelson	197	−19	1 stroke	(United States) Jim Thorpe	1,500,000
2000	(United States) George Archer (2)	207	−9	2 strokes	(United States) Hale Irwin (Australia) Graham Marsh (United States) Dana Quigley (United States) Lee Trevino	1,200,000
1999	(United States) John Jacobs	203	−13	3 strokes	(United States) Jim Colbert (United States) Raymond Floyd	1,100,000
1998	(United States) Gil Morgan	195	−21	6 strokes	(United States) Gibby Gilbert (United States) Hale Irwin	1,000,000
1997	(United States) Hale Irwin	209	−7	2 strokes	(United States) Gil Morgan	1,000,000
Puerto Rico Senior Tournament of Champions
1996	(South Africa) John Bland	207	−9	1 stroke	(United States) Jim Colbert	800,000
Senior Tournament of Champions
1995	(United States) Jim Colbert	209	−7	Playoff	(United States) Jim Albus	750,000
Mercedes Championships
1994	(United States) Jack Nicklaus	279	−9	1 stroke	(United States) Bob Murphy	500,000
Infiniti Senior Tournament of Champions
1993	(United States) Al Geiberger (2)	280	−8	2 strokes	(United States) Jim Dent	350,000
1992	(United States) Al Geiberger	282	−6	3 strokes	(Australia) Bruce Crampton (United States) Chi-Chi Rodríguez	350,000
1991	(Australia) Bruce Crampton	279	−9	4 strokes	(United States) Frank Beard	350,000
MONY Senior Tournament of Champions
1990	(United States) George Archer	283	−5	7 strokes	(Australia) Bruce Crampton	250,000
1989	(United States) Miller Barber (2)	280	−8	1 stroke	(United States) Dale Douglass	250,000
1988	(United States) Dave Hill	211 (Note: Shortened to 54 holes due to weather.)	−5	1 stroke	(United States) Miller Barber (United States) Al Geiberger	100,000
1987	(United States) Don January	287	−1	Playoff	(United States) Butch Baird	100,000
1986	(United States) Miller Barber	282	−6	5 strokes	(United States) Arnold Palmer	100,000
1985	(Australia) Peter Thomson	284	−4	3 strokes	(United States) Don January (United States) Dan Sikes	100,000
1984	(United States) Orville Moody	288	E	7 strokes	(United States) Dan Sikes	100,000

== Multiple winners ==
Eight players have won this tournament more than once through 2022.

- 3 wins
  - Bernhard Langer: 2009, 2014, 2017
  - Miguel Ángel Jiménez: 2015, 2020, 2022
- 2 wins
  - John Cook: 2011, 2013
  - Hale Irwin: 1997, 2007
  - Dana Quigley: 2003, 2005
  - George Archer: 1990, 2000
  - Al Geiberger: 1992, 1993 (consecutive)
  - Miller Barber: 1986, 1989
