= Charles Schwab Cup Championship =

Golf tournament in Arizona, U.S.

Coordinates: 33.4816°N 112.0636°W

Tournament information
- Location: Phoenix, Arizona
- Established: 1990
- Course: Phoenix Country Club
- Par: 71
- Length: 6,763 yards (6,184 m)
- Tour: PGA Tour Champions
- Format: Stroke play
- Prize fund: US$3,000,000
- Month played: November

Tournament record score
- Aggregate: 257 Pádraig Harrington (2022)
- To par: −27 as above

Current champion
- (United States) Stewart Cink

Location map
- Location in the United States Location in Arizona

The Charles Schwab Cup Championship is the final event of the season on the U.S.-based PGA Tour Champions, the world's leading golf tour for male professionals aged 50 and above. Played in late October or early November each year, it is PGA Tour Champions' equivalent of the PGA Tour's Tour Championship, and was formerly known as the Senior Tour Championship. Like the Tour Championship, it has a small field (30 from 1990 through 2015, and 36 from 2016 forward) and no half-way cut.

Through 2015, the top 30 money winners made up the field. Since 2016, 36 golfers have competed, and the event is the final stage of a three-tournament playoff similar to that used by the regular PGA Tour for its FedEx Cup. Through 2015, the tournament had another distinction that made it unique on PGA Tour Champions – it was the only event, other than the tour's five majors, contested over four rounds. In 2016 and 2017, it returned to being held over three rounds. In 2018, it returns to being held over four rounds. Since 2013, the purse has been $2,500,000, with $440,000 going to the winner.

== Tournament hosts ==
Years	Venue	City
1990–1993	Hyatt Dorado Beach	Dorado, Puerto Rico
1994–1999	The Dunes Golf and Beach Club	Myrtle Beach, South Carolina
2000	TPC of Myrtle Beach	Murrells Inlet, South Carolina
2001–2002	Gaillardia Golf and Country Club	Oklahoma City, Oklahoma
2003–2009	Sonoma Golf Club	Sonoma, California
2010–2011, 2013	TPC Harding Park	San Francisco, California
2012, 2014–2016	Desert Mountain Club (Cochise Course)	Scottsdale, Arizona
2017–2023	Phoenix Country Club	Phoenix, Arizona

== Winners ==
PGA Tour Champions (Charles Schwab Cup Playoffs)	2016–2019, 2021–
Champions Tour (Regular event/Regular season Tour Championship)	1990–2015, 2020

#	Year	Winner	Score	To par	Margin of victory	Runner(s)-up
Charles Schwab Cup Championship
37th	2026	(United States) Stewart Cink (2)	265	−19	2 strokes	(United States) Zach Johnson
36th	2025	(United States) Stewart Cink	264	−20	2 strokes	(New Zealand) Steven Alker
35th	2024	(Germany) Bernhard Langer	266	−18	1 stroke	(New Zealand) Steven Alker (Australia) Richard Green
34th	2023	(New Zealand) Steven Alker	266	−18	1 stroke	(Canada) Mike Weir (South Africa) Ernie Els
33rd	2022	(Republic of Ireland) Pádraig Harrington	257	−27	7 strokes	(Germany) Alex Čejka
32nd	2021	(United States) Phil Mickelson	265	−19	1 stroke	(New Zealand) Steven Alker
31st	2020	(United States) Kevin Sutherland (2)	198	−15	Playoff	(England) Paul Broadhurst
30th	2019	(United States) Jeff Maggert	263	−21	Playoff	(South Africa) Retief Goosen
29th	2018	(Fiji) Vijay Singh	262	−22	4 strokes	(United States) Tim Petrovic
28th	2017	(United States) Kevin Sutherland	198	−15	1 stroke	(Fiji) Vijay Singh
27th	2016	(United States) Paul Goydos	195	−15	2 strokes	(Germany) Bernhard Langer
26th	2015	(United States) Billy Andrade	266	−14	Playoff	(Germany) Bernhard Langer
25th	2014	(United States) Tom Pernice Jr.	269	−11	Playoff	(United States) Jay Haas
24th	2013	(United States) Fred Couples	267	−17	6 strokes	(Germany) Bernhard Langer (United States) Mark O'Meara (Australia) Peter Senior
23rd	2012	(United States) Tom Lehman	258	−22	6 strokes	(United States) Jay Haas
22nd	2011	(United States) Jay Don Blake	276	−8	2 strokes	(United States) Michael Allen (United States) Mark Calcavecchia (United States) Jay Haas (United States) Loren Roberts
21st	2010	(United States) John Cook (2)	267	−17	2 strokes	(United States) Michael Allen
20th	2009	(United States) John Cook	266	−22	5 strokes	(United States) Russ Cochran
19th	2008	(United States) Andy Bean	268	−20	9 strokes	(United States) Gene Jones
18th	2007	(United States) Jim Thorpe (3)	268	−20	3 strokes	(United States) Fred Funk (Zimbabwe) Denis Watson
17th	2006	(United States) Jim Thorpe (2)	271	−17	2 strokes	(United States) Tom Kite
16th	2005	(United States) Tom Watson (3)	272	−16	1 stroke	(United States) Jay Haas
15th	2004	(Republic of Ireland) Mark McNulty	277	−11	1 stroke	(United States) Tom Kite
14th	2003	(United States) Jim Thorpe	268	−20	3 strokes	(United States) Tom Watson
Senior Tour Championship
13th	2002	(United States) Tom Watson (2)	274	−14	1 stroke	(United States) Gil Morgan
12th	2001	(United States) Bob Gilder	277	−11	1 stroke	(United States) Doug Tewell
IR Senior Tour Championship
11th	2000	(United States) Tom Watson	270	−18	1 stroke	(United States) John Jacobs
Ingersoll-Rand Senior Tour Championship
10th	1999	(United States) Gary McCord	276	−12	1 stroke	(United States) Bruce Fleisher (United States) Larry Nelson
Energizer Senior Tour Championship
9th	1998	(United States) Hale Irwin	274	−14	5 strokes	(United States) Gil Morgan
8th	1997	(United States) Gil Morgan	272	−16	2 strokes	(United States) Hale Irwin
7th	1996	(United States) Jay Sigel	279	−9	2 strokes	(United States) Kermit Zarley
6th	1995	(United States) Jim Colbert	282	−6	1 stroke	(United States) Raymond Floyd
Golf Magazine Senior Tour Championship
5th	1994	(United States) Raymond Floyd (2)	273	−15	Playoff	(United States) Jim Albus
Hyatt Senior Tour Championship
4th	1993	(South Africa) Simon Hobday	199	−17	2 strokes	(United States) Raymond Floyd (United States) Larry Gilbert
Senior Tour Championship
3rd	1992	(United States) Raymond Floyd	197	−19	5 strokes	(United States) George Archer (United States) Dale Douglass
New York Life Champions
2nd	1991	(United States) Mike Hill (2)	202	−14	2 strokes	(United States) Jim Colbert
1st	1990	(United States) Mike Hill	201	−15	Playoff	(United States) Dale Douglass (United States) Lee Trevino
