= Colbert Hills =

Golf course in Manhattan, Kansas, US

- Interactive map of Colbert Hills
- 39°12′42″N 96°38′36″W

Club information
- Location: Manhattan, Kansas; United States
- Established: 2000
- Type: Public
- Owner: Kansas State University
- Tota holes: 18
- Website: Colbert Hills Official Site

Colbert Hills
- Designed by: Jeff Brauer and Jim Colbert
- Par: 72
- Length: 7525 Yards
- Course rating: 77.50

Colbert Hills Golf Course is a public golf course located in Manhattan, Kansas. Utilizing the natural ecosystem of the surrounding Flint Hills, it is a links-style course with few trees. From its opening to 2011 Colbert Hills was ranked by Golfweek as the best public course in Kansas, and it has ranked as the second-best from 2012 to present. Among both public and private courses, it has also been continuously ranked by Golf Digest among the top eight overall in the state.

The course is home to the men's and women's golf teams of Kansas State University, and is used by the university as an environmental research and turf management facility. Colbert Hills is also home to The First Tee Academy and the Earl Woods National Youth Golf Academy.

The course was co-designed by professional golfer Jim Colbert, a Kansas State University graduate. A statue of him stands at the facility. Colbert Hills also features a Par-3 course.

== History ==
The course opened with an invitational pro-am tournament on April 30, 2000. Among those competing in the tournament were Jim Colbert, Lee Trevino, Raymond Floyd, Annika Sörenstam and Manhattan native Deb Richard. Also present at the opening was Tim Finchem, Commissioner of the PGA Tour.

A new clubhouse was completed in May 2010, on the tenth anniversary of the course.

== Tournaments ==
Colbert Hills was host to the Big 12 Conference women's golf championships on April 19–21, 2002.

== Layout and Signature Holes ==
The signature hole is number 7, which is a 600-yard par 5 that begins with a 90-foot (27 m) drop from the tee to the fairway. The initial landing area is bracketed by 3 bunkers, making controlled shots essential. The second landing area is also well bunkered, combining with the bunkers at the green to require an entrance from the right side of the second landing area.

== Scorecard ==
Distances listed are from the black/blue tee boxes.

Hole 1	Par 5	590 Yards	Hole 10	Par 5	614 Yards
Hole 2	Par 4	412 Yards	Hole 11	Par 3	230 Yards
Hole 3	Par 4	416 Yards	Hole 12	Par 4	434 Yards
Hole 4	Par 4	494 Yards	Hole 13	Par 4	357 Yards
Hole 5	Par 3	213 Yards	Hole 14	Par 4	487 Yards
Hole 6	Par 4	428 Yards	Hole 15	Par 4	375 Yards
Hole 7	Par 5	600 Yards	Hole 16	Par 5	513 Yards
Hole 8	Par 3	210 Yards	Hole 17	Par 3	237 Yards
Hole 9	Par 4	462 Yards	Hole 18	Par 4	453 Yards
