= Ohio Kings Island Open =

Golf tournament

Tournament information
- Location: Mason, Ohio
- Established: 1973
- Course: Jack Nicklaus Golf Center
- Par: 70
- Length: 6,837 yards (6,252 m)
- Tour: PGA Tour
- Format: Stroke play
- Prize fund: US$150,000
- Month played: September
- Final year: 1977

Tournament record score
- Aggregate: 269 Mike Hill (1977)
- To par: −13 Jack Nicklaus (1973)

Final champion
- (United States) Mike Hill
- Location in the United States Location in Ohio

The Ohio Kings Island Open was a golf tournament on the PGA Tour from 1973 to 1977. It was played at Jack Nicklaus Golf Center in Mason, Ohio. The tournament was dropped when the LPGA Championship moved there in 1978. There was no tournament in 1975 due to conflict with the Ryder Cup.

== Tournament highlights ==
- 1973: Jack Nicklaus shoots a third round 62 on his way to a six-shot victory over Lee Trevino in the inaugural version of the tournament. After the tournament was over, Nicklaus announced he would be giving all of his first place check, $25,000, to charity.
- 1974: Miller Barber notches a victory for the eighth consecutive year. His 72-hole total of 277 is good enough for a three shot win over George Johnson.
- 1976: Ben Crenshaw sinks a 14-foot birdie putt on the 72nd hole to beat Andy North by one shot.
- 1977: Mike Hill wins the last edition of the tournament by one shot over Tom Kite.

== Winners ==
| Year | Winner | Score | To par | Margin of victory | Runner-up |
|---|---|---|---|---|---|
| 1977 | (United States) Mike Hill | 269 | −11 | 1 stroke | (United States) Tom Kite |
| 1976 | (United States) Ben Crenshaw | 271 | −9 | 1 stroke | (United States) Andy North |
1975: No tournament
| 1974 | (United States) Miller Barber | 277 | −7 | 3 strokes | (United States) George Johnson |
| 1973 | (United States) Jack Nicklaus | 271 | −13 | 6 strokes | (United States) Lee Trevino |
