= Mike Hill (golfer) =

American professional golfer (1939–2025)

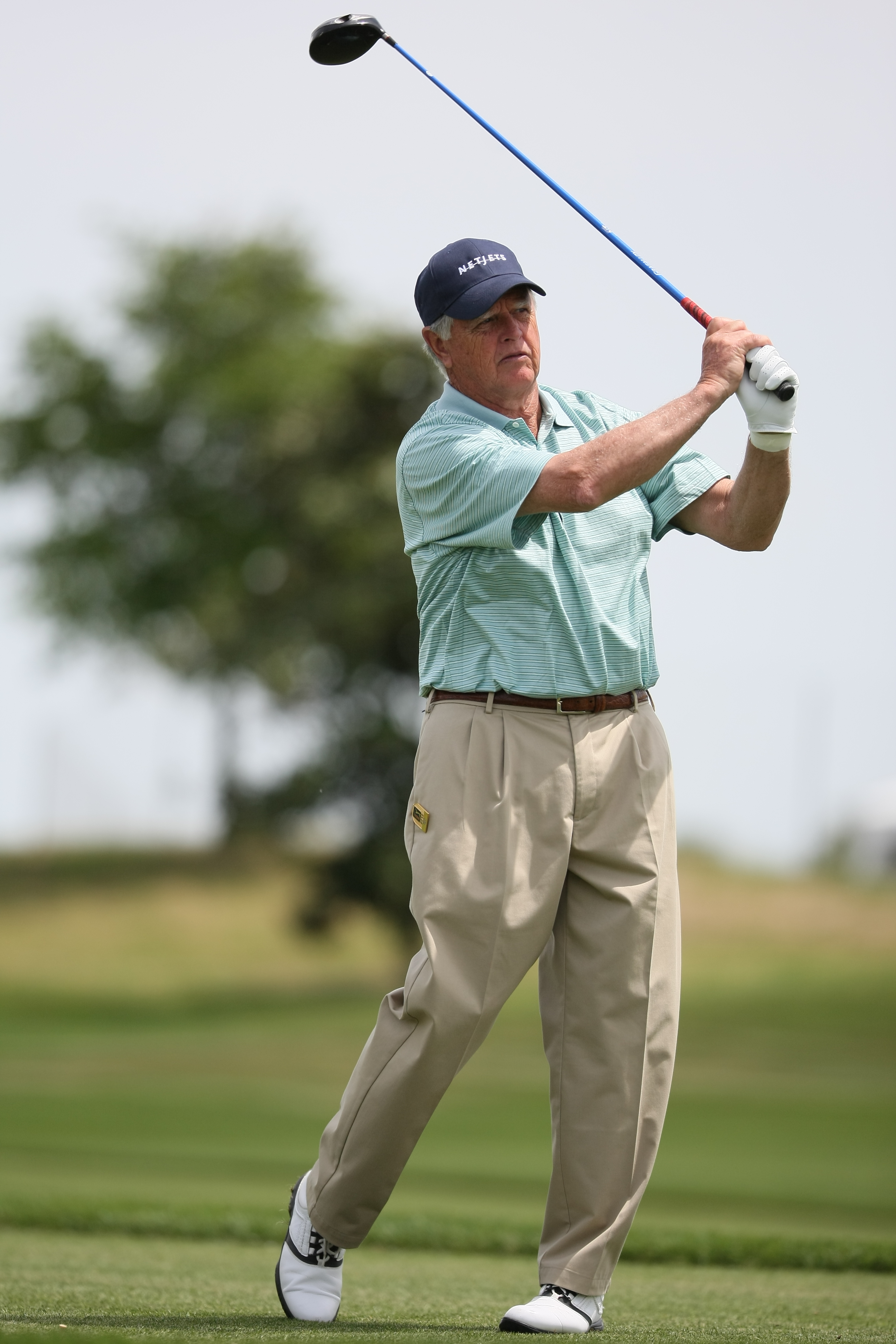
- Hill in 2010

Personal information
- Full name: Michael Joseph Hill
- Nationality: United States
- Born: January 27, 1939 Jackson, Michigan, U.S.
- Died: August 4, 2025 (aged 86) Ann Arbor, Michigan, U.S.
- Height: 5 ft 9 in (1.75 m)
- Weight: 180 lb (82 kg; 13 st)

Career
- Sport: Golf
- College: Arizona State University
- Turned professional: 1967
- Former tours: PGA Tour; Champions Tour
- Professional wins: 27

Number of wins by tour
- PGA Tour: 3
- PGA Tour Champions: 18
- Other: 6

Best results in major championships
- Masters Tournament: T37: 1978
- PGA Championship: T11: 1974
- U.S. Open: T55: 1972
- The Open Championship: DNP

Achievements and awards
- Senior PGA Tour money list winner: 1991
- Senior PGA Tour Player of the Year: 1991

Michael Joseph Hill (January 27, 1939 – August 4, 2025) was an American professional golfer.

== Career ==
In 1939, Hill was born in Jackson, Michigan. He attended Arizona State University in Tempe.

In 1967, Hill professional. Hill had three PGA Tour wins and his best finish in a major was a tie for eleventh at the PGA Championship in 1974.

Hill won 18 times on the Senior PGA Tour and topped the money list in 1991. He was the younger brother of notable PGA Tour player Dave Hill.

== Personal life ==
Hill died in Ann Arbor, Michigan on August 4, 2025 at age 86.

== Professional wins (27) ==
=== PGA Tour wins (3) ===
No.	Date	Tournament	Winning score	Margin of victory	Runner-up
1	Mar 1, 1970	Doral-Eastern Open Invitational	−9 (70-69-69-71=279)	4 strokes	(United States) Jim Colbert
2	Nov 5, 1972	San Antonio Texas Open	−15 (67-68-69-69=273)	2 strokes	(United States) Lee Trevino
3	Sep 25, 1977	Ohio Kings Island Open	−11 (68-65-72-64=269)	1 stroke	(United States) Tom Kite

=== Senior PGA Tour wins (18) ===
Legend
Tour Championships (2)
Other Senior PGA Tour (16)

No.	Date	Tournament	Winning score	Margin of victory	Runner(s)-up
1	Feb 11, 1990	GTE Suncoast Classic	−9 (68-69-70=207)	2 strokes	(United States) Lee Trevino
2	Sep 2, 1990	GTE North Classic	−15 (66-67-68=201)	Playoff	(Australia) Bruce Crampton
3	Sep 30, 1990	Fairfield Barnett Space Coast Classic	−16 (66-70-64=200)	Playoff	(United States) Dale Douglass
4	Nov 4, 1990	Security Pacific Senior Classic	−15 (70-68-63=201)	1 stroke	(South Africa) Gary Player
5	Dec 16, 1990	New York Life Champions	−15 (69-64-68=201)	Playoff	(United States) Dale Douglass, (United States) Lee Trevino
6	Apr 28, 1991	Doug Sanders Kingwood Celebrity Classic	−13 (66-66-71=203)	1 stroke	(United States) George Archer
7	Jul 21, 1991	Ameritech Senior Open	−16 (67-66-67=200)	2 strokes	(New Zealand) Bob Charles
8	Aug 18, 1991	GTE Northwest Classic	−18 (68-66-64=198)	2 strokes	(United States) Chi-Chi Rodríguez
9	Sep 22, 1991	Nationwide Championship	−4 (70-71-71=212)	1 stroke	(United States) Tom Shaw
10	Dec 15, 1991	New York Life Champions (2)	−14 (70-65-67=202)	2 strokes	(United States) Jim Colbert
11	Mar 22, 1992	Vintage ARCO Invitational	−13 (67-66-70=203)	Playoff	(United States) Tommy Aaron, (United States) Jim Colbert
12	May 17, 1992	Doug Sanders Kingwood Celebrity Classic (2)	−10 (70-64=134)*	2 strokes	(United States) Gibby Gilbert, (United States) Larry Mowry
13	Aug 9 1992	Digital Seniors Classic	−8 (69-67=136)*	Playoff	(United States) Walt Zembriski
14	Feb 14, 1993	Better Homes & Gardens Real Estate Challenge	−14 (67-65-70=202)	2 strokes	(United States) Dave Stockton
15	May 16, 1993	PaineWebber Invitational	−12 (69-67-68=204)	2 strokes	(United States) Tom Weiskopf
16	Feb 20, 1994	IntelliNet Challenge (2)	−15 (69-69-63=201)	3 strokes	(United States) Tom Wargo
17	Jul 9, 1995	Kroger Senior Classic	−17 (64-66-66=196)	3 strokes	(Japan) Isao Aoki
18	Sep 15, 1996	Bank One Classic	−9 (70-69-68=207)	1 stroke	(Japan) Isao Aoki, (United States) Gibby Gilbert

*Note: Tournament shortened to 36 holes due to weather.

Senior PGA Tour playoff record (5–1)

No.	Year	Tournament	Opponent(s)	Result
1	1990	GTE North Classic	(Australia) Bruce Crampton	Won with birdie on first extra hole
2	1990	Fairfield Barnett Space Coast Classic	(United States) Dale Douglass	Won with par on first extra hole
3	1990	New York Life Champions	(United States) Dale Douglass, (United States) Lee Trevino	Won with birdie on first extra hole
4	1992	Vintage ARCO Invitational	(United States) Tommy Aaron, (United States) Jim Colbert	Won with birdie on first extra hole
5	1992	Digital Seniors Classic	(United States) Walt Zembriski	Won with par on second extra hole
6	1996	Emerald Coast Classic	(United States) Bob Eastwood, (Australia) David Graham, (United States) Dave Stockton, (United States) Lee Trevino	Trevino won with birdie on first extra hole

=== Other senior wins (6) ===
- 1989 Mazda Champions (with Patti Rizzo)
- 1991 Liberty Mutual Legends of Golf (with Lee Trevino)
- 1992 Liberty Mutual Legends of Golf (with Lee Trevino)
- 1995 Liberty Mutual Legends of Golf (with Lee Trevino)
- 1996 Liberty Mutual Legends of Golf (with Lee Trevino)
- 2000 Liberty Mutual Legends of Golf - Legendary Division (with Lee Trevino)

== Results in major championships ==
Tournament	1970	1971	1972	1973	1974	1975	1976	1977	1978	1979	1980
Masters Tournament				CUT					T37		
U.S. Open	CUT	CUT	T55								
PGA Championship	T16	T46	T40	T24	T11	T17	T15		CUT		CUT

Note: Hill never played in The Open Championship.

Did not play

CUT = missed the half-way cut
"T" indicates a tie for a place

== See also ==
- Spring 1968 PGA Tour Qualifying School graduates
- List of golfers with most PGA Tour Champions wins
