= GTE Northwest Classic =

Coordinates: 47.75°N 122.255°W

Tournament information
- Location: Kenmore, Washington, U.S.
- Established: 1986
- Courses: Inglewood Golf Club (1987–1995)
- Par: 72
- Length: 6,440 yards (5,889 m)
- Tour: Senior PGA Tour
- Format: Stroke play - 54 holes
- Prize fund: $600,000
- Month played: September
- Final year: 1995

Tournament record score
- Aggregate: 198 Mike Hill (1991)
- To par: –18 as above

Final champion
- (United States) Walter Morgan

Location in the United States
Location in Washington

The GTE Northwest Classic was a professional golf tournament in the Seattle area on the Senior PGA Tour. Played for ten seasons, from 1986 through 1995, its inaugural event was at Sahalee Country Club (now in Sammamish) and the last nine were at Inglewood Golf Club in Kenmore. The title sponsor was GTE Northwest, a local telephone operating company headquartered in Everett.

Bruce Crampton was the only multiple winner, with victories at both venues; the only playoff was in 1994, won by Simon Hobday with a birdie on the third extra hole to defeat Jim Albus. The purse for the final edition in 1995 was $600,000, with a winner's share of $90,000, which was at the low end of the scale. The sponsors opted not to renew for 1996 and the event was discontinued.

The senior tour returned to the Seattle area in 2005 with the Boeing Classic at TPC Snoqualmie Ridge in Snoqualmie.

== Winners ==
| Year | Dates | Champion | Winning score | To par | Margin of victory | Purse ($) | Winner's share ($) |
|---|---|---|---|---|---|---|---|
| 1995 | Sep 8–10 | (United States) Walter Morgan | 68-68-67=203 | −13 | 3 strokes | 600,000 | 90,000 |
| 1994 | Sep 2–4 | (South Africa) Simon Hobday | 70-69-70=209 | −7 | Playoff | 550,000 | 82,500 |
| 1993 | Aug 20–22 | (United States) Dave Stockton | 65-68-67=200 | −16 | 4 strokes | 500,000 | 75,000 |
| 1992 | Aug 21–23 | (United States) Mike Joyce | 70-70-64=204 | −12 | 2 strokes | 450,000 | 67,500 |
| 1991 | Aug 16–18 | (United States) Mike Hill | 68-66-64=198 | −18 | 2 strokes | 400,000 | 60,000 |
| 1990 | Aug 24–26 | (United States) George Archer | 69-66-70=205 | −11 | 2 strokes | 350,000 | 52,500 |
| 1989 | Aug 18–20 | (United States) Al Geiberger | 68-68-68=204 | −12 | 3 strokes | 350,000 | 52,500 |
| 1988 | Jul 8–10 | (Australia) Bruce Crampton (2) | 69-68-70=207 | −9 | 1 stroke | 300,000 | 45,000 |
| 1987 | Aug 21–23 | (United States) Chi-Chi Rodríguez | 70-68-68=206 | −10 | 1 stroke | 300,000 | 45,000 |
| 1986 | Aug 15–17 | (Australia) Bruce Crampton | 67-71-72=210 | −6 | 2 strokes | 250,000 | 37,500 |

Note: Green highlight indicates scoring records.

- Only the first edition in 1986 was held at Sahalee Country Club, set at 6,696 yards (6,123 m) and par 72.
