= Larry Laoretti =

American professional golfer (born 1939)

Personal information
- Nationality: United States
- Born: July 11, 1939 (age 87) Mahopac, New York, U.S.
- Height: 5 ft 11 in (1.80 m)
- Weight: 185 lb (84 kg; 13.2 st)
- Children: 3

Career
- Sport: Golf
- Turned professional: 1960
- Former tour: Champions Tour

Number of wins by tour
- PGA Tour Champions: 1

Best results in major championships
- Masters Tournament: DNP
- PGA Championship: T49: 1966
- U.S. Open: CUT: 1974
- The Open Championship: DNP

Achievements and awards
- Senior PGA Tour Comeback Player of the Year: 1991

Larry Laoretti (born July 11, 1939) is an American professional golfer.

== Early life ==
Laoretti was born in Mahopac, New York. He worked for the U.S. Navy in his early adulthood.

== Professional career ==
For most of his career as a golfer, Laoretti worked as a club professional. He won no tournaments of note until he was past 50. His best finish in a major was T-49 at the 1966 PGA Championship.

In 1989, Laoretti won both the regular and senior Florida PGA championships, and he joined the Senior PGA Tour the following season. In 1992, he won the U.S. Senior Open. His trademark was playing, including during his swing, with a lit cigar in his mouth.

== Awards and honors ==
In 1991, Laoretti earned Senior PGA Tour Comeback Player of the Years honors

== Professional wins (1) ==
=== Senior PGA Tour wins (1) ===
Legend
Senior major championships (1)
Other Senior PGA Tour (0)

No.	Date	Tournament	Winning score	Margin of victory	Runner-up
1	Jul 12, 1992	U.S. Senior Open	−9 (68-72-67-68=275)	4 strokes	(United States) Jim Colbert

== Senior major championships ==
=== Wins (1) ===
Year	Championship	Winning score	Margin	Runner-up
1992	U.S. Senior Open	−9 (68-72-67-68=275)	4 strokes	(United States) Jim Colbert

== U.S. national team appearances ==
Professional

- Wendy's 3-Tour Challenge (representing Senior PGA Tour): 1992
