= John Jacobs (American golfer) =

American professional golfer (born 1945)

Personal information
- Full name: John Alexander Jacobs
- Nationality: United States
- Born: March 18, 1945 (age 81) Los Angeles, California, U.S.
- Height: 6 ft 3 in (1.91 m)
- Weight: 225 lb (102 kg; 16.1 st)

Career
- Sport: Golf
- College: University of Southern California
- Turned professional: 1967
- Current tour: Champions Tour
- Former tours: PGA Tour; Asia Golf Circuit
- Professional wins: 12

Number of wins by tour
- Japan Golf Tour: 1
- PGA Tour Champions: 5
- Other: 6

Best results in major championships
- Masters Tournament: DNP
- PGA Championship: WD: 2003
- U.S. Open: T58: 1976
- The Open Championship: T53: 1975

Achievements and awards
- Asia Golf Circuit Order of Merit winner: 1984

John Alexander Jacobs (born March 18, 1945) is an American professional golfer who played on the PGA Tour and currently plays on the Champions Tour.

== Early life ==
In 1945, Jacobs was born in Los Angeles, California. He is the younger brother of professional golfer Tommy Jacobs.

== Professional career ==
In 1967, Jacobs turned professional. He played on the PGA Tour from 1968–1977. He never won an official PGA Tour event; his best showings were three 2nd-place finishes. He also played in Asia for many years, having considerable success on the Asia Golf Circuit, where he won the Taiwan Open twice and was the first American to top the tour's Order of Merit in 1984.

After reaching the age of 50 in 1995, Jacobs began play on the Champions Tour. His accomplishments as a senior include a major championship and more than 70 top-10 finishes.

== Awards and honors ==
In 1984, Jacobs won the Asia Golf Circuit's Order of Merit.

== Professional wins (12) ==
=== Asia Golf Circuit wins (3) ===
No.	Date	Tournament	Winning score	Margin of victory	Runner-up
1	Apr 8, 1984	Taiwan Open	+2 (76-73-69=218) (Note: Shortened to 36/54 holes due to weather.)	3 strokes	(Taiwan) Hsieh Min-Nan
2	Apr 22, 1984	Dunlop International Open^{1}	−5 (73-69-69-72=283)	2 strokes	(Japan) Tateo Ozaki
2	Apr 14, 1991	Sanyang Republic of China Open (2)	−3 (73-67-70-75=285)	Playoff	(Philippines) Antolin Fernando

^{1}Co-sanctioned by the PGA of Japan Tour

Asia Golf Circuit playoff record (1–0)

No.	Year	Tournament	Opponent	Result
1	1991	Sanyang Republic of China Open	(Philippines) Antolin Fernando	Won with birdie on first extra hole

=== Other wins (3) ===
- 1978 Waterloo Open Golf Classic
- 1980 Shrine Pro-Am (Canada)
- 1986 Rolex Masters (Singapore)

=== Champions Tour wins (5) ===
Legend
Senior major championships (1)
Other Champions Tour (4)

No.	Date	Tournament	Winning score	Margin of victory	Runner(s)-up
1	Jun 7, 1998	Nationwide Championship	−10 (72-67-67=206)	1 stroke	(United States) Hale Irwin
2	Jan 24, 1999	MasterCard Championship	−13 (64-69-70=203)	3 strokes	(United States) Jim Colbert, (United States) Raymond Floyd
3	Apr 30, 2000	Bruno's Memorial Classic	−13 (68-71-64=203)	Playoff	(United States) Gil Morgan
4	Feb 3, 2002	Royal Caribbean Classic	−11 (67-66=133)	1 stroke	(Japan) Isao Aoki, (United States) Bruce Fleisher, (United States) Tom Watson
5	Jun 8, 2003	Senior PGA Championship	−4 (68-69-71-68=276)	2 strokes	(United States) Bobby Wadkins

Champions Tour playoff record (1–2)

No.	Year	Tournament	Opponent(s)	Result
1	1999	Toshiba Senior Classic	(United States) Allen Doyle, (United States) Al Geiberger, (United States) Gary McCord	McCord won with birdie on fifth extra hole Doyle and Geiberger eliminated by eagle on first hole
2	2000	Bruno's Memorial Classic	(United States) Gil Morgan	Won with par on first extra hole
3	2002	The Countrywide Tradition	(United States) Jim Thorpe	Lost to birdie on first extra hole

=== Other senior wins (1) ===
- 1995 Senior Series Gulfport Open

== Playoff record ==
PGA Tour playoff record (0–1)

No.	Year	Tournament	Opponent	Result
1	1972	Greater Jacksonville Open	(England) Tony Jacklin	Lost to par on first extra hole

== Senior major championships ==
=== Wins (1) ===
Year	Championship	Winning score	Margin	Runner-up
2003	Senior PGA Championship	−4 (68-69-71-68=276)	2 strokes	(United States) Bobby Wadkins

== See also ==
- Spring 1968 PGA Tour Qualifying School graduates
- Fall 1980 PGA Tour Qualifying School graduates
