= Lee Trevino =

American professional golfer (born 1939)

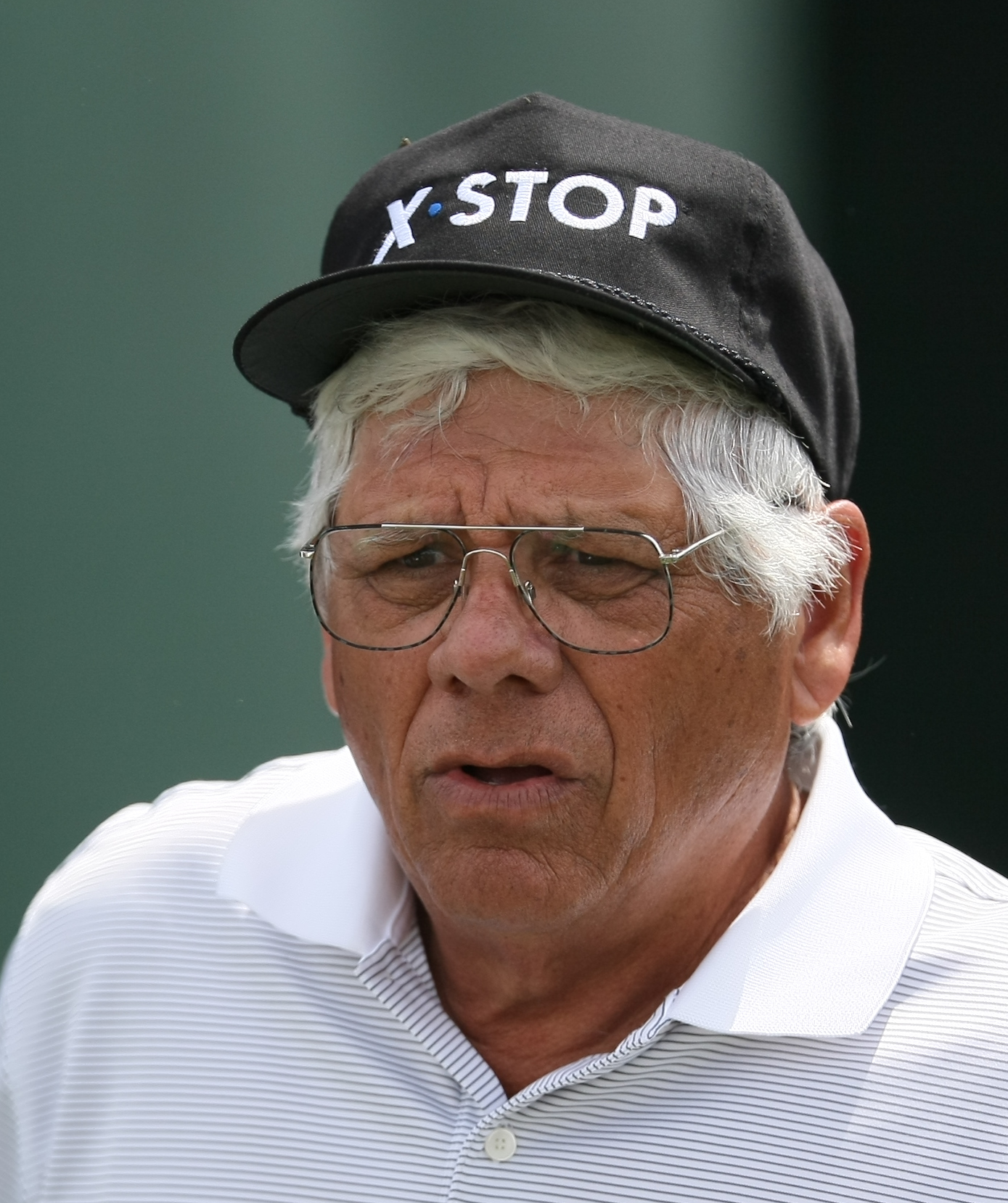
- Trevino in 2010

Personal information
- Full name: Lee Buck Trevino
- Nicknames: The Merry Mex, Supermex
- Nationality: United States
- Born: December 1, 1939 (age 86) Garland, Texas, U.S.
- Height: 5 ft 7 in (170 cm)
- Weight: 180 lb (82 kg; 13 st)
- Spouses: Claudia Fenley (divorced) Claudia Bove (m. 1983)
- Children: 6

Career
- Sport: Golf
- Turned professional: 1960
- Former tours: PGA Tour; Champions Tour
- Professional wins: 92

Number of wins by tour
- PGA Tour: 29
- European Tour: 5
- Japan Golf Tour: 1
- Sunshine Tour: 1
- PGA Tour of Australasia: 1
- PGA Tour Champions: 29 (3rd all-time)
- Other: 19 (regular); 10 (senior)

Best results in major championships (wins: 6)
- Masters Tournament: T10: 1975, 1985
- PGA Championship: Won: 1974, 1984
- U.S. Open: Won: 1968, 1971
- The Open Championship: Won: 1971, 1972

Achievements and awards
- World Golf Hall of Fame: 1981 (member page)
- PGA Tour money list winner: 1970
- Vardon Trophy: 1970, 1971, 1972, 1974, 1980
- PGA Player of the Year: 1971
- Sports Illustrated Sportsman of the Year: 1971
- Associated Press Male Athlete of the Year: 1971
- Byron Nelson Award: 1980
- Senior PGA Tour money list winner: 1990, 1992
- Senior PGA Tour Player of the Year: 1990, 1992, 1994
- Senior PGA Tour Rookie of the Year: 1990
- Senior PGA Tour Byron Nelson Award: 1990, 1991, 1992

Lee Buck Trevino (born December 1, 1939) is a Mexican-American retired professional golfer who is regarded as one of the greatest players in golf history. Born in Garland, Texas, and raised by his mother and grandfather, he began working in cotton fields at age five and left school at 14 to work as a caddie, teaching himself to play on the caddie's practice holes. He went on to win six major championships, 29 PGA Tour events, and 29 events on the Senior PGA TOUR, and was inducted to the World Golf Hall of Fame in 1981. Trevino is an icon for Mexican Americans, and is often referred to as "the Merry Mex" and "Supermex", both affectionate nicknames given to him by other golfers. He has established scholarships and other financial aid for Mexican American students.

== Early life ==
Trevino was born in Garland, Texas, into a family of Mexican ancestry. He was raised by his mother, Juanita Trevino, and his grandfather, Joe Trevino, a gravedigger. Trevino never knew his father, Joseph Trevino, who left when his son was small. During his childhood, Trevino occasionally attended school and worked to earn money for the family. At age 5, he started working in the cotton fields.

Trevino was introduced to golf by an uncle who gave him a few golf balls and an old golf club. He spent his free time sneaking into nearby country clubs to practice and began as a caddie at the Dallas Athletic Club, near his home, soon working there full-time. He left school at 14 to work earning $30 a week as a caddie and shoe shiner. The caddies had access to three short holes behind their shack, where he practiced after work, hitting at least 300 balls a day. Many of these practice shots were struck from the bare ground with very little grass (known locally as 'Texas hardpan') and often in very windy conditions. It is this that is widely believed to be the reason Trevino developed his extremely distinct, unique (many would say unorthodox), and compact swing method, which he went on to develop with tremendous effect. A very pronounced controlled "fade" was his signature shot, although he had many other shot types in his repertoire and he is, still to this day, remembered as one of the very finest shot-makers of all time.

When Trevino turned 17 in December 1956, he enlisted in the United States Marine Corps, and served four years as a machine gunner and was discharged in December 1960 as a corporal with the 3rd Marine Division. He spent part of his time playing golf with Marine Corps officers. He played successfully in Armed Forces golf events in Asia, where one rival was Orville Moody, who would follow Trevino to the PGA Tour in the late 1960s.

== Professional career ==
After Trevino was discharged from the Marines, he went to work as a club professional in El Paso, Texas. He made extra money by gambling for stakes in head-to-head matches. He qualified for the U.S. Open in 1966, made the cut, and tied for 54th, earning $600. He qualified again in 1967 and shot 283 (+3), eight shots behind champion Jack Nicklaus, and only four behind runner-up Arnold Palmer. Trevino earned $6,000 for finishing fifth, which earned him Tour privileges for the rest of the 1967 season. He won $26,472 as a rookie, 45th on the PGA Tour money list, and was named Rookie of the Year by Golf Digest. The fifth-place finish at the U.S. Open also earned him an exemption into the following year's event.

In 1968, his second year on the circuit, Trevino won the U.S. Open at Oak Hill Country Club, in Rochester, New York, four strokes ahead of runner-up Nicklaus, the defending champion. His rounds of 69-68-69-69 was the first time 70 was broken in all 4 rounds of a U.S. Open. During his career, Trevino won 29 times on the PGA Tour, including six majors. He was at his best in the early 1970s, when he was Jack Nicklaus's chief rival. He won the money list title in 1970, and had six wins in 1971 and four wins in 1972.

Trevino had a remarkable string of victories during a 20-day span in the summer of 1971. He defeated Nicklaus in an 18-hole playoff to win the 1971 U.S. Open. Two weeks later, he won the Canadian Open (the first of three), and the following week won The Open Championship (British Open), becoming the first player to win those three titles in the same year. Trevino was awarded the Hickok Belt as the top professional athlete of 1971. He also won Sports Illustrated magazine's "Sportsman of the Year" and was named ABC's Wide World of Sports Athlete of the Year.

In 1972 at Muirfield in Scotland, Trevino became the first player to successfully defend The Open Championship since Arnold Palmer in 1962. In a remarkable third round at Muirfield, Trevino had five consecutive birdies from the 14th through the 18th, holing a bunker shot on the 16th and sinking a 30–foot chip on the 18th for a round of 66. In the final round, Trevino was tied for the lead on the 17th tee with Tony Jacklin. Trevino chipped in from rough on the back of the green for a par on the 17th. A shaken Jacklin three-putted the same hole from 15 feet for a bogey. Trevino parred the 18th hole for a final round of 71, winning him the Open by a stroke over Nicklaus, with Jacklin finishing third. Trevino holed out four times from off the greens during the tournament. Nicklaus had won the first two majors of the year (Masters, U.S. Open) and fell just short in the third leg of the grand slam. After holing his chip shot on the 17th in the final round, Trevino said: "I'm the greatest chipper in the world."

In 1974, Trevino won the Greater New Orleans Open without scoring any bogeys, the only time it had happened in a PGA Tour individual event until J. T. Poston accomplished the feat at the 2019 Wyndham Championship. At the PGA Championship he won the fifth of his six major championships. He won the title by a stroke, again over Nicklaus, the fourth and final time Nicklaus was a runner-up in a major to Trevino. At the Western Open near Chicago in 1975, Trevino was struck by lightning, and suffered injuries to his spine. He underwent surgery to remove a damaged spinal disk, but back problems continued to hamper his play. Nevertheless, he was ranked second in McCormack's World Golf Rankings in 1980 behind Tom Watson. Trevino had three PGA Tour wins in 1980 and finished runner-up to Tom Watson in the 1980 Open Championship. At the age of 44, Trevino won his sixth and final major at the PGA Championship in 1984, with a 15-under-par score of 273, becoming the first player to shoot all four rounds under 70 in the PGA Championship. He was the runner-up the following year in 1985, attempting to become the first repeat champion since Denny Shute in 1937.

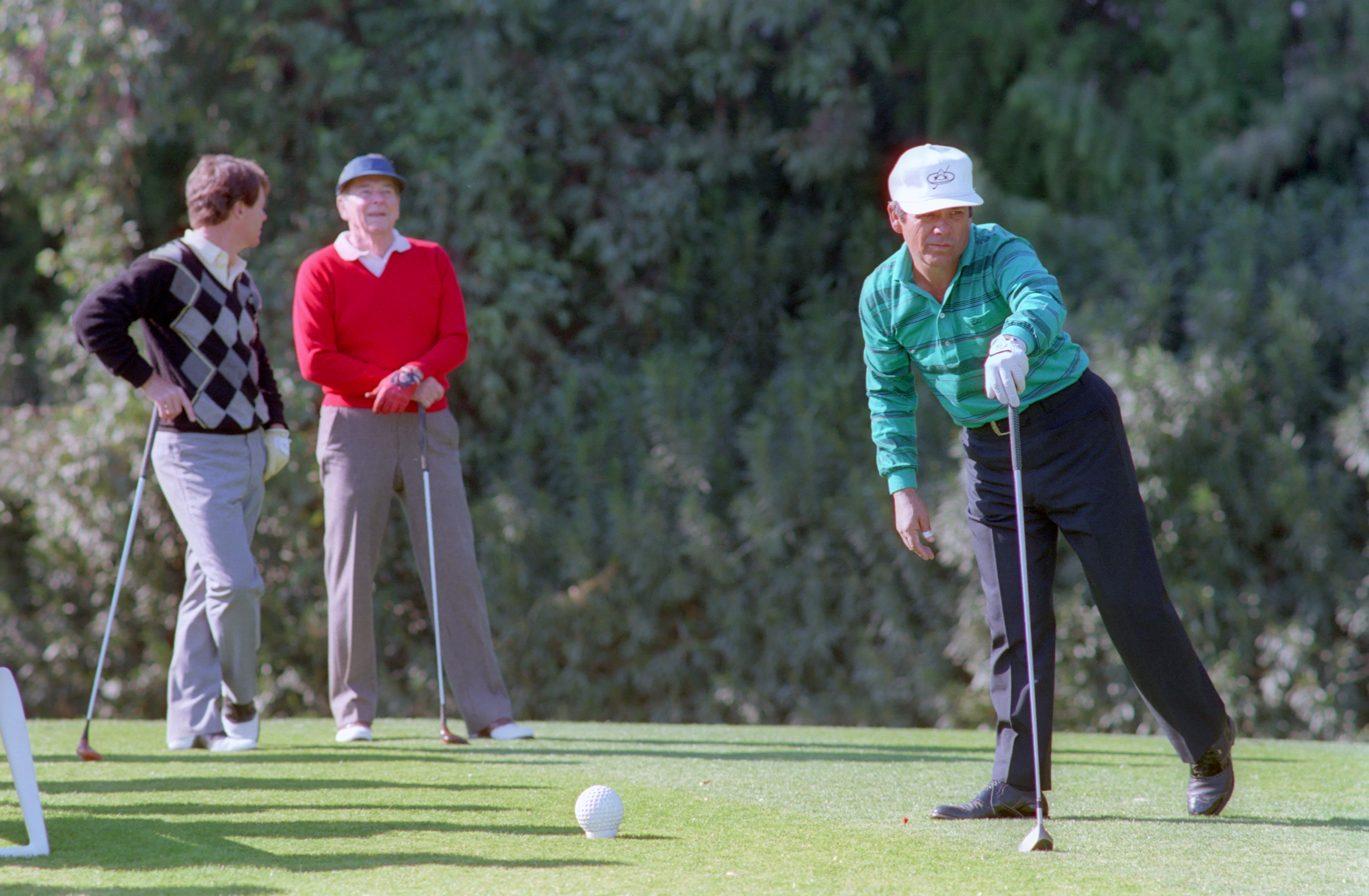
Tom Watson (left) with President Ronald Reagan and Trevino in 1988

In the early 1980s, Trevino was second on the PGA Tour's career money list, behind only Nicklaus. From 1968 to 1981 inclusive, Trevino won at least one PGA Tour event a year, a streak of 14 seasons. He also won more than 20 international and unofficial professional tournaments. He was one of the charismatic stars who was instrumental in making the Senior PGA Tour (now the PGA Tour Champions) an early success. He claimed 29 senior wins, including four senior majors. He topped the seniors' money list in 1990 and 1992.

Like many American stars of the era, Trevino played a considerable amount overseas. Early in his career he played sporadically on the Australasian Tour. He finished runner-up in the 1969 and 1970 Dunlop International and ultimately won down under at the 1973 Chrysler Classic. He also won an event on the Japan Golf Tour, the Casio World Open in 1981. Trevino also had a great deal of success in Europe. Among his greatest triumphs were at the 1971 Open Championship and 1972 Open Championship. Trevino was also invited to play at the very prestigious (though unofficial) Piccadilly World Match Play Championship three times (1968, 1970, 1972). He reached the finals twice. His most notable performance probably came in 1970 when he defeated defending Masters champion Billy Casper in the quarterfinals and defending PGA champion Dave Stockton in the semifinals. He also won two regular European Tour events late in his career at 1978 Benson & Hedges International Open and 1985 Dunhill British Masters. In fact, his last regular tour win was at the British Masters. Additionally, he finished runner-up at three European Tour events: the 1980 Bob Hope British Classic, 1980 Open Championship, and the 1986 Benson & Hedges International Open.

From 1983 to 1989, he worked as a color analyst for PGA Tour coverage on NBC television. In 2014 Trevino was named "Golf Professional Emeritus" at The Greenbrier resort in White Sulphur Springs, West Virginia, a position previously held by Sam Snead and Tom Watson.

=== Masters Tournament ===
At the Masters Tournament in 1989, 49-year-old Trevino opened with a bogey-free five-under-par 67 to become the oldest to lead the field after a round in the tournament. It came despite Trevino's words twenty years earlier, when he said after the 1969 edition: "Don't talk to me about the Masters. I'm never going to play there again. They can invite me all they want, but I'm not going back. It's just not my type of course." Trevino said that he felt uncomfortable with the atmosphere at Augusta National and that he disliked the course because his style of play, where he liked to fade low shots left to right, was not suited to the course.

Trevino did not accept invitations to the Masters in 1970, 1971, and 1974. In 1972, after forgoing the previous two Masters tournaments, he stored his shoes and other items in the trunk of his car, rather than use the locker room facilities in the clubhouse. Trevino complained that had he not qualified as a player, the club would not have let him onto the grounds except through the kitchen. But he later described his boycott of the Masters as "the greatest mistake I've made in my career" and called Augusta National "the eighth wonder of the world."

After his opening round 67 in 1989, Trevino tied for eighteenth; his best career result at the Masters was a tie for tenth (1975, 1985).

== Distinctions and honors ==
- Trevino was the first player to shoot all four regulation rounds under par at the U.S. Open. At Oak Hill in 1968, Trevino played rounds of 69-68-69-69.
- A major street in El Paso, Texas was named Lee Trevino Drive in his honor, and streets in Rio Rancho and Belen, New Mexico were also named for him.
- Trevino received the 1971 BBC Overseas Sports Personality of the Year Award.
- Trevino received the 1971 Sporting News Sportsman of the Year Award.
- One of two golfers to win the PGA Tour's three oldest events in the same year: The Open Championship (1860), the U.S. Open (1895), and the Canadian Open (1904). Trevino won in 1971 and Tiger Woods won in 2000
- Trevino played for the United States in the Ryder Cup six times (1969, 1971, 1973, 1975, 1979, 1981), and had an impressive 17–7–6 (.667) record. He also served as team captain in 1985.
- Trevino won the Vardon Trophy for lowest scoring average five times: 1970, 1971, 1972, 1974 and 1980.
- Trevino has established numerous scholarships and other financial aid to Mexican-Americans.
- Trevino was inducted into the World Golf Hall of Fame in 1981.
- In 2000, Golf Digest magazine ranked Trevino as the 14th-greatest golfer of all time.

== Humor ==
Throughout his career, Trevino was seen as approachable and humorous, and was frequently quoted by the press. Late in his career, he remarked, "I played the tour in 1967 and told jokes and nobody laughed. Then I won the Open the next year, told the same jokes, and everybody laughed like hell."

At the beginning of Trevino's 1971 U.S. Open playoff against Jack Nicklaus, he threw a rubber snake that his daughter had put in his bag as a joke at Nicklaus, who later admitted that he asked Trevino to throw it to him so he could see it. Trevino grabbed the rubbery object and playfully tossed it at Nicklaus, getting a scream from a nearby woman and a hearty laugh from Nicklaus. Trevino shot a 68 to defeat Nicklaus by three strokes.

During one tournament, Tony Jacklin, paired with Trevino, said: "Lee, I don't want to talk today." Trevino retorted: "I don't want you to talk. I just want you to listen."

Trevino made a notable cameo appearance in the comedy Happy Gilmore, appearing in several scenes where he's a witness to Happy's anger outbursts, always shaking his head in shocked disapproval. His only spoken line is when the movie's antagonist, Shooter McGavin, says to Happy in sarcasm, "Yeah, right, and Grizzly Adams had a beard," to which an unexpected Trevino appears and says to McGavin, "Grizzly Adams did have a beard." Trevino would later regret appearing in the film, due to the amount of swearing.

After he was struck by lightning at the 1975 Western Open, Trevino was asked by a reporter what he would do if he were out on the course and it began to storm again. Trevino answered he would take out his 1-iron and point it to the sky, "because not even God can hit a 1-iron." Trevino said later in an interview with David Feherty that he must have tempted God the week before by staying outside during a lightning delay to entertain the crowds, saying "I deserved to get hit...God can hit a 1-iron."

Trevino said: "I've been hit by lightning and been in the Marine Corps for four years. I've traveled the world and been about everywhere you can imagine. There's not anything I'm scared of except my wife."

== Professional wins (92) ==
=== PGA Tour wins (29) ===
Legend
Major championships (6)
Players Championships (1)
Other PGA Tour (22)

No.	Date	Tournament	Winning score	To par	Margin of victory	Runner(s)-up
1	Jun 16, 1968	U.S. Open	69-68-69-69=275	−5	4 strokes	(United States) Jack Nicklaus
2	Nov 10, 1968	Hawaiian Open	68-71-65-68=272	−16	2 strokes	(United States) George Archer
3	Feb 23, 1969	Tucson Open Invitational	67-70-68-66=271	−17	7 strokes	(United States) Miller Barber
4	Feb 15, 1970	Tucson Open Invitational (2)	66-68-72-69=275	−13	Playoff	(United States) Bob Murphy
5	Mar 29, 1970	National Airlines Open Invitational	69-66-68-71=274	−14	Playoff	(United States) Bob Menne
6	Apr 25, 1971	Tallahassee Open Invitational	69-67-69-68=273	−15	3 strokes	(United States) Jim Wiechers
7	May 30, 1971	Danny Thomas Memphis Classic	66-66-69-67=268	−12	4 strokes	(United States) Lee Elder, (United States) Jerry Heard, (United States) Hale Irwin, (United States) Randy Wolff
8	Jun 21, 1971	U.S. Open (2)	70-72-69-69=280	E	Playoff	(United States) Jack Nicklaus
9	Jul 4, 1971	Canadian Open	73-68-67-67=275	−13	Playoff	(United States) Art Wall Jr.
10	Jul 10, 1971	The Open Championship	69-70-69-70=278	−14	1 stroke	(Taiwan) Lu Liang-Huan
11	Oct 31, 1971	Sahara Invitational	69-72-73-66=280	−8	1 stroke	(United States) George Archer
12	May 21, 1972	Danny Thomas Memphis Classic (2)	70-72-72-67=281	−7	4 strokes	(United States) John Mahaffey
13	Jul 15, 1972	The Open Championship (2)	71-70-66-71=278	−6	1 stroke	(United States) Jack Nicklaus
14	Sep 4, 1972	Greater Hartford Open Invitational	64-68-72-65=269	−15	Playoff	(United States) Lee Elder
15	Sep 17, 1972	Greater St. Louis Golf Classic	65-68-66-70=269	−11	1 stroke	(United States) Deane Beman
16	Feb 25, 1973	Jackie Gleason Inverrary-National Airlines Classic	69-69-69-72=279	−9	1 stroke	(United States) Forrest Fezler
17	Mar 11, 1973	Doral-Eastern Open	64-70-71-71=276	−12	1 stroke	(Australia) Bruce Crampton, (United States) Tom Weiskopf
18	Mar 31, 1974	Greater New Orleans Open	67-68-67-65=267	−21	8 strokes	(South Africa) Bobby Cole, (United States) Ben Crenshaw
19	Aug 11, 1974	PGA Championship	73-66-68-69=276	−4	1 stroke	(United States) Jack Nicklaus
20	Mar 9, 1975	Florida Citrus Open	69-66-70-71=276	−12	1 stroke	(United States) Hale Irwin
21	May 16, 1976	Colonial National Invitation	68-64-68-73=273	−7	1 stroke	(United States) Mike Morley
22	Jul 24, 1977	Canadian Open (2)	67-68-71-74=280	−8	4 strokes	(England) Peter Oosterhuis
23	May 14, 1978	Colonial National Invitation (2)	66-68-68-66=268	−12	4 strokes	(United States) Jerry Heard, (United States) Jerry Pate
24	Jun 24, 1979	Canadian Open (3)	67-71-72-71=281	−3	3 strokes	(United States) Ben Crenshaw
25	Mar 23, 1980	Tournament Players Championship	68-72-68-70=278	−10	1 stroke	(United States) Ben Crenshaw
26	Jun 29, 1980	Danny Thomas Memphis Classic (3)	67-68-68-69=272	−16	1 stroke	(United States) Tom Purtzer
27	Sep 21, 1980	San Antonio Texas Open	66-67-67-65=265	−15	1 stroke	(United States) Terry Diehl
28	Apr 19, 1981	MONY Tournament of Champions	67-67-70-69=273	−15	2 strokes	(United States) Raymond Floyd
29	Aug 19, 1984	PGA Championship (2)	69-68-67-69=273	−15	4 strokes	(South Africa) Gary Player, (United States) Lanny Wadkins

PGA Tour playoff record (5–5)

No.	Year	Tournament	Opponent(s)	Result
1	1970	Tucson Open Invitational	(United States) Bob Murphy	Won with birdie on first extra hole
2	1970	National Airlines Open Invitational	(United States) Bob Menne	Won with par on second extra hole
3	1970	Kaiser International Open Invitational	(United States) Ken Still, (United States) Bert Yancey	Still won with birdie on first extra hole
4	1971	Kemper Open	(United States) Dale Douglass, (South Africa) Gary Player, (United States) Tom Weiskopf	Weiskopf won with birdie on first extra hole
5	1971	U.S. Open	(United States) Jack Nicklaus	Won 18-hole playoff; Trevino: −2 (68), Nicklaus: +1 (71)
6	1971	Canadian Open	(United States) Art Wall Jr.	Won with birdie on first extra hole
7	1972	Greater Hartford Open	(United States) Lee Elder	Won with birdie on first extra hole
8	1978	Danny Thomas Memphis Classic	(United States) Andy Bean	Lost to birdie on first extra hole
9	1978	Greater Milwaukee Open	(United States) Lee Elder	Lost to par on eighth extra hole
10	1980	Michelob-Houston Open	(United States) Curtis Strange	Lost to birdie on first extra hole

=== European Tour wins (5) ===
Legend
Major championships (3)
Other European Tour (2)

No.	Date	Tournament	Winning score	To par	Margin of victory	Runner(s)-up
1	Jul 15, 1972	The Open Championship	71-70-66-71=278	−6	1 stroke	(United States) Jack Nicklaus
2	Aug 11, 1974	PGA Championship	73-66-68-69=276	−4	1 stroke	(United States) Jack Nicklaus
3	Aug 12, 1978	Benson & Hedges International Open	69-67-72-66=274	−10	Playoff	(England) Neil Coles, (Australia) Noel Ratcliffe
4	Aug 19, 1984	PGA Championship (2)	69-68-67-69=273	−15	4 strokes	(South Africa) Gary Player, (United States) Lanny Wadkins
5	Jun 10, 1985	Dunhill British Masters	74-68-69-67=278	−10	3 strokes	(Australia) Rodger Davis

European Tour playoff record (1–1)

No.	Year	Tournament	Opponents	Result
1	1978	Benson & Hedges International Open	(England) Neil Coles, (Australia) Noel Ratcliffe	Won with par on fourth extra hole Ratcliffe eliminated by par on first hole
2	1986	Benson & Hedges International Open	(South Africa) Hugh Baiocchi, (England) Mark James	James won with birdie on first extra hole

=== PGA of Japan Tour wins (1) ===
No.	Date	Tournament	Winning score	To par	Margin of victory	Runner-up
1	Nov 29, 1981	Casio World Open	68-67-71-69=275	−13	4 strokes	(Japan) Isao Aoki

=== Southern Africa Tour wins (1) ===
No.	Date	Tournament	Winning score	To par	Margin of victory	Runner-up
1	Feb 7, 1981	Sun City Classic	72-64-72-73=281	−7	1 stroke	(Zimbabwe) Mark McNulty

=== PGA Tour of Australia wins (1) ===
No.	Date	Tournament	Winning score	To par	Margin of victory	Runner-up
1	Nov 4, 1973	Chrysler Classic	68-72-69-68=277	−15	4 strokes	(Australia) Stewart Ginn

=== Other wins (17) ===
- 1965 Texas State Open
- 1966 Texas State Open, New Mexico Open
- 1969 World Cup (team with Orville Moody), World Cup Individual Trophy
- 1971 World Cup (team with Jack Nicklaus)
- 1972 New Mexico Open
- 1973 Mexican Open
- 1974 World Series of Golf
- 1975 Mexican Open
- 1977 Morocco Grand Prix
- 1978 Lancome Trophy
- 1979 Labatt's International Golf Classic
- 1980 Lancome Trophy, Johnnie Walker Trophy
- 1981 PGA Grand Slam of Golf
- 1983 Labatt's International Golf Classic
- 1987 Skins Game
- 2001 Tylenol Par-3 Shootout

=== Senior PGA Tour wins (29) ===
Legend
Senior PGA Tour major championships (4)
Other Senior PGA Tour (25)

No.	Date	Tournament	Winning score	To par	Margin of victory	Runner(s)-up
1	Feb 4, 1990	Royal Caribbean Classic	71-67-68=206	−10	1 stroke	(United States) Butch Baird, (United States) Jim Dent
2	Feb 18, 1990	Aetna Challenge	66-67-67=200	−16	1 stroke	(Australia) Bruce Crampton
3	Mar 4, 1990	Vintage Chrysler Invitational	66-67-72=205	−11	1 stroke	(United States) Dale Douglass, (United States) Mike Hill, (United States) Don Massengale
4	May 20, 1990	Doug Sanders Kingwood Celebrity Classic	67-67-69=203	−13	6 strokes	(South Africa) Gary Player
5	Jun 3, 1990	NYNEX Commemorative	66-66-67=199	−11	Playoff	(United States) Mike Fetchick, (United States) Jimmy Powell, (United States) Chi-Chi Rodríguez
6	Jul 1, 1990	U.S. Senior Open	67-68-73-67=275	−13	2 strokes	(United States) Jack Nicklaus
7	Oct 21, 1990	Transamerica Senior Golf Championship	73-67-65=205	−11	2 strokes	(United States) Mike Hill
8	Feb 17, 1991	Aetna Challenge (2)	71-68-66=205	−11	1 stroke	(United States) Dale Douglass
9	Mar 17, 1991	Vantage at The Dominion	67-70=137 (Note: Shortened to 36 holes due to weather.)	−7	2 strokes	(United States) Mike Hill, (United States) Charles Coody, (United States) Rocky Thompson
10	Aug 25, 1991	Sunwest Bank Charley Pride Senior Golf Classic	66-65-69=200	−16	4 strokes	(United States) Jim O'Hern, (United States) Chi-Chi Rodríguez
11	Mar 15, 1992	Vantage at The Dominion (2)	68-66-67=201	−15	2 strokes	(United States) Chi-Chi Rodríguez
12	Apr 5, 1992	The Tradition	67-69-68-70=274	−14	1 stroke	(United States) Jack Nicklaus
13	Apr 19, 1992	PGA Seniors' Championship	72-64-71-71=278	−10	1 stroke	(United States) Mike Hill
14	May 3, 1992	Las Vegas Senior Classic	71-68-67=206	−10	1 stroke	(United States) Orville Moody
15	May 24, 1992	Bell Atlantic Classic	65-72-68=205	−5	1 stroke	(United States) Gibby Gilbert
16	May 30, 1993	Cadillac NFL Golf Classic	67-70-72=209	−7	2 strokes	(Australia) Bruce Crampton, (United States) Raymond Floyd
17	Sep 26, 1993	Nationwide Championship	66-66-73=205	−11	2 strokes	(United States) George Archer, (United States) Jim Ferree, (United States) Mike Hill, (United States) Dave Stockton, (United States) Rocky Thompson
18	Oct 3, 1993	Vantage Championship	65-67-66=198	−18	5 strokes	(United States) DeWitt Weaver
19	Feb 6, 1994	Royal Caribbean Classic (2)	66-73-66=205	−8	Playoff	(United States) Kermit Zarley
20	Apr 17, 1994	PGA Seniors' Championship (2)	70-69-70-70=279	−9	1 stroke	(United States) Jim Colbert
21	May 15, 1994	PaineWebber Invitational	70-65-68=203	−13	1 stroke	(United States) Jim Colbert, (United States) Jimmy Powell
22	May 29, 1994	Bell Atlantic Classic (2)	71-67-68=206	−4	2 strokes	(United States) Mike Hill
23	Jun 19, 1994	BellSouth Senior Classic	67-65-67=199	−17	1 stroke	(United States) Jim Albus, (United States) Dave Stockton
24	Jul 31, 1994	Northville Long Island Classic	66-69-65=200	−17	7 strokes	(United States) Jim Colbert
25	Aug 20, 1995	Northville Long Island Classic (2)	67-69-66=202	−14	4 strokes	(United States) Buddy Allin
26	Oct 8, 1995	The Transamerica (2)	66-69-66=201	−15	3 strokes	(United States) Bruce Summerhays
27	Nov 3, 1996	Emerald Coast Classic	69-70-68=207	−3	Playoff	(United States) Bob Eastwood, (Australia) David Graham, (United States) Mike Hill, (United States) Dave Stockton
28	Mar 29, 1998	Southwestern Bell Dominion (3)	69-69-67=205	−11	2 strokes	(United States) Mike McCullough
29	Jun 25, 2000	Cadillac NFL Golf Classic (2)	66-67-69=202	−14	2 strokes	(United States) Walter Hall

Senior PGA Tour playoff record (3–3)

No.	Year	Tournament	Opponent(s)	Result
1	1990	NYNEX Commemorative	(United States) Mike Fetchick, (United States) Jimmy Powell, (United States) Chi-Chi Rodríguez	Won with birdie on fifth extra hole Powell and Rodríguez eliminated by birdie on first hole
2	1990	New York Life Champions	(United States) Dale Douglass, (United States) Mike Hill	Hill won with birdie on first extra hole
3	1993	Ping Kaanapali Classic	(United States) George Archer, (United States) Dave Stockton	Archer won with birdie on first extra hole
4	1994	Royal Caribbean Classic	(United States) Kermit Zarley	Won with par on fourth extra hole
5	1996	Emerald Coast Classic	(United States) Bob Eastwood, (Australia) David Graham, (United States) Mike Hill, (United States) Dave Stockton	Won with birdie on first extra hole
6	1997	Home Depot Invitational	(United States) Jim Dent, (United States) Larry Gilbert	Dent won with birdie on second extra hole Gilbert eliminated by birdie on first hole

=== Other senior wins (10) ===
- 1991 Liberty Mutual Legends of Golf (with Mike Hill)
- 1992 Mitsukoshi Classic, Liberty Mutual Legends of Golf (with Mike Hill)
- 1993 American Express Grandslam
- 1994 American Express Grandslam
- 1995 Liberty Mutual Legends of Golf (with Mike Hill)
- 1996 Liberty Mutual Legends of Golf (with Mike Hill), Australian PGA Seniors Championship
- 2000 Liberty Mutual Legends of Golf – Legendary Division (with Mike Hill)
- 2003 ConAgra Foods Champions Skins Game

== Major championships ==
=== Wins (6) ===
Year	Championship	54 holes	Winning score	Margin	Runner(s)-up
1968	U.S. Open	1 shot deficit	−5 (69-68-69-69=275)	4 strokes	(United States) Jack Nicklaus
1971	U.S. Open (2)	4 shot deficit	E (70-72-69-69=280)	Playoff^{1}	(United States) Jack Nicklaus
1971	The Open Championship	1 shot lead	−14 (69-70-69-70=278)	1 stroke	(Taiwan) Lu Liang-Huan
1972	The Open Championship (2)	1 shot lead	−6 (71-70-66-71=278)	1 stroke	(United States) Jack Nicklaus
1974	PGA Championship	1 shot lead	−4 (73-66-68-69=276)	1 stroke	(United States) Jack Nicklaus
1984	PGA Championship (2)	1 shot lead	−15 (69-68-67-69=273)	4 strokes	(South Africa) Gary Player, (United States) Lanny Wadkins

^{1}Defeated Jack Nicklaus in 18-hole playoff; Trevino 68 (−2), Nicklaus 71 (+1).

=== Results timeline ===
Tournament	1966	1967	1968	1969
Masters Tournament			T40	T19
U.S. Open	T54	5	1	CUT
The Open Championship				T34
PGA Championship			T23	T48

Tournament	1970	1971	1972	1973	1974	1975	1976	1977	1978	1979
Masters Tournament			T33	T43		T10	T28		T14	T12
U.S. Open	T8	1	T4	T4	CUT	T29		T27	T12	T19
The Open Championship	T3	1	1	T10	T31	T40		4	T29	T17
PGA Championship	T26	T13	T11	T18	1	T60	CUT	T13	T7	T35

Tournament	1980	1981	1982	1983	1984	1985	1986	1987	1988	1989
Masters Tournament	T26	CUT	T38	T20	43	T10	47	CUT	CUT	T18
U.S. Open	T12	CUT	CUT		T9	CUT	T4	CUT	T40	CUT
The Open Championship	2	T11	T27	5	T14	T20	T59	T17	CUT	T42
PGA Championship	7	DQ		T14	1	2	T11		CUT	CUT

Tournament	1990	1991	1992	1993	1994	1995	1996	1997	1998	1999	2000
Masters Tournament	T24	T49									
U.S. Open		CUT									
The Open Championship	T25	T17	T39		CUT	CUT					CUT
PGA Championship	CUT										

Win
Top 10
Did not play

CUT = missed the halfway cut
"T" indicates a tie for a place.

=== Summary ===
Tournament	Wins	2nd	3rd	Top-5	Top-10	Top-25	Events	Cuts made
Masters Tournament	0	0	0	0	2	8	20	17
U.S. Open	2	0	0	6	8	11	23	15
The Open Championship	2	1	1	6	7	14	26	22
PGA Championship	2	1	0	3	5	12	21	16
Totals	6	2	1	15	22	45	90	70

- Most consecutive cuts made – 16 (1969 Open Championship – 1973 PGA)
- Longest streak of top-10s – 2 (seven times)

== The Players Championship ==
=== Wins (1) ===
Year	Championship	54 holes	Winning score	Margin	Runner-up
1980	Tournament Players Championship	1 shot lead	−10 (68-72-68-70=278)	1 stroke	(United States) Ben Crenshaw

=== Results timeline ===
Tournament	1974	1975	1976	1977	1978	1979	1980	1981	1982	1983	1984	1985	1986	1987
The Players Championship	18	T50	T17		WD	T5	1	T12	DQ	T68	2	T55	T21	CUT

Win
Top 10
Did not play

CUT = missed the halfway cut
WD = withdrew
DQ = disqualified
"T" indicates a tie for a place.

== Champions Tour major championships ==
=== Wins (4) ===
Year	Championship	Winning score	Margin	Runner(s)-up
1990	U.S. Senior Open	−13 (67–68–73–67=275)	2 strokes	(United States) Jack Nicklaus
1992	The Tradition	−14 (67–69–68–70=274)	1 stroke	(United States) Jack Nicklaus
1992	PGA Seniors' Championship	−10 (72–64–71–71=278)	1 stroke	(United States) Mike Hill
1994	PGA Seniors' Championship (2)	−9 (70–69–70–70=279)	1 stroke	(United States) Jim Colbert

== U.S. national team appearances ==
Professional

- Ryder Cup: 1969 (tied), 1971 (winners), 1973 (winners), 1975 (winners), 1979 (winners), 1981 (winners), 1985 (non-playing captain)
- World Cup: 1968, 1969 (winners, individual winner), 1970, 1971 (winners), 1974

== See also ==
- Hispanics in the United States Marine Corps
- List of golfers with most PGA Tour Champions wins
- List of golfers with most Champions Tour major championship wins
- List of golfers with most PGA Tour wins
- List of men's major championships winning golfers
- Monday Night Golf
- Lee Trevino's Fighting Golf
