= Dave Stockton =

American professional golfer (born 1941)

Personal information
- Full name: David Knapp Stockton
- Nationality: United States
- Born: November 2, 1941 (age 84) San Bernardino, California, U.S.
- Height: 5 ft 11 in (1.80 m)
- Weight: 190 lb (86 kg; 14 st)

Career
- Sport: Golf
- College: University of Southern California
- Turned professional: 1964
- Former tours: PGA Tour; Champions Tour
- Professional wins: 25

Number of wins by tour
- PGA Tour: 10
- PGA Tour Champions: 14
- Other: 1

Best results in major championships (wins: 2)
- Masters Tournament: T2: 1974
- PGA Championship: Won: 1970, 1976
- U.S. Open: T2: 1978
- The Open Championship: T11: 1971

Achievements and awards
- Senior PGA Tour Rookie of the Year: 1992
- Senior PGA Tour money list winner: 1993, 1994
- Senior PGA Tour Player of the Year: 1993

David Knapp Stockton (born November 2, 1941) is an American retired professional golfer who has won tournaments on both the PGA Tour and the Champions Tour.

== Early life and amateur career ==
In 1941, Stockton was born in San Bernardino, California. He attended the University of Southern California.

== Professional career ==
In 1964, Stockton turned professional. His first PGA Tour win came at the 1967 Colonial National Invitation. Stockton was selected by former Colonial champions as one of two Champion's Choice invitations; he is the only Champion's Choice invitee to win the Colonial in the year of the invitation.

Stockton's best year was 1974, when he won three times, but his two majors, both of which were PGA Championships, came in 1970 and 1976. In 1970 he played the final round with Arnold Palmer, shooting a seventy-three which included an eagle and a double-bogey on the seventh and the eighth holes, respectively, and making a bogey on the thirteenth despite putting a ball in the water. In the end, this effort was good enough for a two stroke victory over Palmer and Bob Murphy. Due to rain at the 1976 PGA Championship, which was held at the Congressional Country Club, the final round had to be delayed until Monday. Stockton sank a fifteen-foot par putt at the seventy-second hole to avoid a three-man playoff with Raymond Floyd and Don January.

Stockton played for the U.S. team in the Ryder Cup in 1971 and 1977. He was the Americans' victorious non-playing captain in the 1991 Ryder Cup at Kiawah Island.

=== Senior career ===
In 1991, Stockton joined the Senior PGA Tour and enjoyed continued success, topping the Senior Tour money list in 1993 and 1994. His fourteen senior titles include three senior majors, the 1992 and 1994 Senior Players Championships and the 1996 U.S. Senior Open. He remained competitive in his sixties, finishing in the top 50 on the Champions Tour money list for a thirteenth consecutive season in 2004.

When he was an active PGA Tour player, Stockton had the reputation of being one of the best putters. In 2009, Stockton was credited with aiding the world's second-ranked golfer, Phil Mickelson with his putting, which helped him win the 2009 Tour Championship. He wrote a guide to putting called "Unconscious Putting," which was released in 2011.

== Personal life ==
Stockton is married to former Orange Show beauty queen Catherine Hales. They have two children, Dave Jr. and Ron, who both play professional golf.

== Professional wins (25) ==
=== PGA Tour wins (10) ===
Legend
Major championships (2)
Other PGA Tour (8)

No.	Date	Tournament	Winning score	Margin of victory	Runner(s)-up
1	May 21, 1967	Colonial National Invitation	−2 (65-66-74-73=278)	2 strokes	(United States) Charles Coody
2	Jun 30, 1968	Cleveland Open Invitational	−8 (69-68-67-72=276)	2 strokes	(United States) Bob Dickson
3	Jul 14, 1968	Greater Milwaukee Open	−13 (68-67-71-69=275)	4 strokes	(United States) Sam Snead
4	Aug 16, 1970	PGA Championship	−1 (70-70-66-73=279)	2 strokes	(United States) Bob Murphy, (United States) Arnold Palmer
5	Aug 15, 1971	Massachusetts Classic	−13 (71-69-69-66=275)	1 stroke	(United States) Raymond Floyd
6	Jul 8, 1973	Greater Milwaukee Open (2)	−12 (69-63-71-73=276)	1 stroke	(United States) Homero Blancas, (United States) Hubert Green
7	Feb 17, 1974	Glen Campbell-Los Angeles Open	−8 (68-68-71-69=276)	2 strokes	(United States) John Mahaffey, (United States) Sam Snead
8	Jul 14, 1974	Quad Cities Open	−13 (68-68-71-64=271)	1 stroke	(United States) Bruce Fleisher
9	Aug 18, 1974	Sammy Davis Jr.-Greater Hartford Open	−16 (65-65-69-69=268)	4 strokes	(United States) Raymond Floyd
10	Aug 15, 1976	PGA Championship (2)	+1 (70-72-69-70=281)	1 stroke	(United States) Raymond Floyd, (United States) Don January

PGA Tour playoff record (0–1)

No.	Year	Tournament	Opponent	Result
1	1977	Phoenix Open	(United States) Jerry Pate	Lost to birdie on first extra hole

=== Other wins (1) ===
- 1967 Haig & Haig Scotch Foursome (with Laurie Hammer)

=== Senior PGA Tour wins (14) ===
Legend
Senior PGA Tour major championships (3)
Other Senior PGA Tour (11)

No.	Date	Tournament	Winning score	Margin of victory	Runner(s)-up
1	Oct 6, 1992	The Senior Players Championship	−11 (71-67-70-69=277)	1 stroke	(United States) J. C. Snead, (United States) Lee Trevino
2	Apr 25, 1993	Muratec Reunion Pro-Am	−5 (73-72-66=211)	4 strokes	(South Africa) Harold Henning
3	Jun 13, 1993	Southwestern Bell Classic	−6 (65-68-71=204)	1 stroke	(United States) Larry Mowry, (United States) Walt Zembriski
4	Aug 15, 1993	Franklin Quest Championship	−19 (68-66-63=197)	9 strokes	(United States) Al Geiberger
5	Aug 22, 1993	GTE Northwest Classic	−16 (65-68-67=200)	4 strokes	(United States) Dale Douglass
6	Oct 10, 1993	The Transamerica	−13 (68-71-64=203)	1 stroke	(South Africa) Simon Hobday, (United States) Lee Trevino
7	Jun 12, 1994	Nationwide Championship	−18 (67-66-65=198)	1 stroke	(United States) Bob Murphy
8	Jun 26, 1994	Ford Senior Players Championship (2)	−17 (66-66-71-68=271)	6 strokes	(United States) Jim Albus
9	Aug 21, 1994	Burnet Senior Classic	−13 (68-66-69=203)	1 stroke	(United States) Jim Albus
10	Feb 19, 1995	GTE Suncoast Classic	−9 (70-66-68=204)	2 strokes	(New Zealand) Bob Charles, (United States) Jim Colbert, (United States) J. C. Snead
11	May 28, 1995	Quicksilver Classic	−10 (72-69-67=206)	1 stroke	(Japan) Isao Aoki
12	Jul 7, 1996	U.S. Senior Open	−11 (70-67-67-73=277)	2 strokes	(United States) Hale Irwin
13	Aug 11, 1996	First of America Classic	−10 (68-69-69=206)	1 stroke	(United States) Bob Murphy
14	Jul 27, 1997	Franklin Quest Championship (2)	−15 (69-64-68=201)	2 strokes	(United States) Kermit Zarley

Senior PGA Tour playoff record (0–6)

No.	Year	Tournament	Opponent(s)	Result
1	1993	Ping Kaanapali Classic	(United States) George Archer, (United States) Lee Trevino	Archer won with birdie on first extra hole
2	1994	Franklin Quest Championship	(United States) Tom Weiskopf	Lost to birdie on first extra hole
3	1995	Hyatt Regency Maui Kaanapali Classic	(New Zealand) Bob Charles	Lost to birdie on third extra hole
2	1996	Las Vegas Senior Classic	(New Zealand) Bob Charles, (United States) Jim Colbert	Colbert won with par on fourth extra hole Charles eliminated by par on first hole
5	1996	Emerald Coast Classic	(United States) Bob Eastwood, (Australia) David Graham, (United States) Mike Hill, (United States) Lee Trevino	Trevino won with birdie on first extra hole
6	1998	Royal Caribbean Classic	(Australia) David Graham	Lost to birdie on tenth extra hole

== Major championships ==
=== Wins (2) ===
Year	Championship	54 holes	Winning score	Margin	Runners-up
1970	PGA Championship	3 shot lead	−1 (70-70-66-73=279)	2 strokes	(United States) Bob Murphy, (United States) Arnold Palmer
1976	PGA Championship (2)	4 shot deficit	+1 (70-72-69-70=281)	1 stroke	(United States) Raymond Floyd, (United States) Don January

=== Results timeline ===
Tournament	1968	1969
Masters Tournament		18
U.S. Open	T9	T25
The Open Championship		
PGA Championship	T17	T35

Tournament	1970	1971	1972	1973	1974	1975	1976	1977	1978	1979
Masters Tournament	T5	T9	T10	T14	T2	T26		T39	CUT	CUT
U.S. Open		CUT	CUT	T39	T40	T43	CUT	CUT	T2	T36
The Open Championship		T11	T31							
PGA Championship	1	T40	T40	T12	T26	CUT	1	T31	T19	T35

Tournament	1980	1981	1982	1983	1984	1985	1986	1987	1988	1989
Masters Tournament	T26	T31								
U.S. Open	T51	CUT	T45						CUT	
The Open Championship										
PGA Championship	CUT	T43	CUT	CUT	T39	T59	T53	CUT	T48	T68

Tournament	1990	1991	1992	1993	1994	1995	1996	1997
Masters Tournament								
U.S. Open								CUT
The Open Championship								
PGA Championship	CUT	CUT						

Win
Top 10
Did not play

CUT = missed the halfway cut
"T" indicates a tie for a place.

=== Summary ===
Tournament	Wins	2nd	3rd	Top-5	Top-10	Top-25	Events	Cuts made
Masters Tournament	0	1	0	2	4	6	12	10
U.S. Open	0	1	0	1	2	3	16	9
The Open Championship	0	0	0	0	0	1	2	2
PGA Championship	2	0	0	2	2	5	24	17
Totals	2	2	0	5	8	15	54	38

- Most consecutive cuts made – 10 (1972 Open Championship – 1975 U.S. Open)
- Longest streak of top-10s – 3 (1970 Masters – 1971 Masters)

== Results in The Players Championship ==
Tournament	1974	1975	1976	1977	1978	1979	1980	1981	1982	1983	1984	1985	1986	1987
The Players Championship	T30	2	T17	CUT	CUT	T35	T45	T19	T77		CUT	CUT	T48	70

Top 10
Did not play

CUT = missed the halfway cut
"T" indicates a tie for a place

== Champions Tour major championships ==
=== Wins (3) ===
Year	Championship	Winning score	Margin	Runner(s)-up
1992	Mazda Presents The Senior Players Championship	−11 (71-67-70-69-277)	1 stroke	(United States) J. C. Snead (United States) Lee Trevino
1994	Ford Senior Players Championship (2)	−17 (66-66-71-68=271)	6 strokes	(United States) Jim Albus
1996	U.S. Senior Open	−11 (70-67-67-73=277)	2 strokes	(United States) DeWitt Weaver

== U.S. national team appearances ==
Professional

- Ryder Cup: 1971 (winners), 1977 (winners), 1991 (winners, non-playing captain)
- World Cup: 1970, 1976
- Wendy's 3-Tour Challenge (representing Senior PGA Tour): 1994

== See also ==
- List of golfers with most PGA Tour wins
- List of golfers with most PGA Tour Champions wins
