= 1974 PGA Championship =

Tournament information
- Dates: August 8–11, 1974
- Location: Clemmons, North Carolina; 35.993°N 80.405°W
- Courses: Tanglewood Park, Championship Course
- Organized by: PGA of America
- Tour: PGA Tour

Statistics
- Par: 70
- Length: 7,050 yards (6,447 m)
- Field: 141 players, 78 after cut
- Cut: 149 (+9)
- Prize fund: $225,000
- Winner's share: $45,000

Champion
- (United States) Lee Trevino
- 276 (−4)
- Location in the United States Location in North Carolina

The 1974 PGA Championship was the 56th PGA Championship, played August 8–11 at Tanglewood Park in Clemmons, North Carolina, a suburb southwest of Winston-Salem. Lee Trevino won the first of his two PGA Championships, one stroke ahead of defending champion Jack Nicklaus. It was the fifth of Trevino's six major titles and Nicklaus was the runner-up to Trevino in a major for the fourth and final time. It was the first year since 1969 in which Nicklaus did not win a major championship, but he regained the title the following year.

Three-time champion Sam Snead, age 62, finished tied for third for his third consecutive top ten finish in the event. It was the final major in which he was in contention, his next best finish was a tie for 42nd at the PGA Championship in 1979. Gary Player's bid to win three majors in 1974 came up short in the final round; the winner of the Masters and Open Championship finished four strokes back at even par, in seventh place.

Trevino used a putter he found in a friend's attic only days before and had only one three-putt, on the 71st hole. Tanglewood is a county-owned facility in Forsyth County.

This championship coincided with the resignation of President Nixon, who left office on Friday.

== Round summaries ==
=== First round ===
Thursday, August 8, 1974

Place	Player	Score	To par
T1	(United States) Raymond Floyd	68	−2
T1	(United States) Hubert Green	68	−2
T1	(United States) John Schlee	68	−2
T4	(South Africa) Bobby Cole	69	−1
T4	(United States) Jack Nicklaus	69	−1
T4	(United States) Eddie Pearce	69	−1
T4	(United States) Sam Snead	69	−1
T4	(United States) Leonard Thompson	69	−1
T4	(United States) Tom Watson	69	−1
T10	(United States) Jim Colbert	70	E
T10	(Australia) Bruce Devlin	70	E
T10	(United States) Al Geiberger	70	E
T10	(United States) Tom Jenkins	70	E
T10	(United States) Grier Jones	70	E
T10	(United States) Tom Nieporte	70	E
T10	(Mexico) Victor Regalado	70	E
T10	(United States) Mason Rudolph	70	E
T10	(United States) DeWitt Weaver	70	E
T10	(United States) Kermit Zarley	70	E

=== Second round ===
Friday, August 9, 1974

Place	Player	Score	To par
1	(United States) John Schlee	68-67=135	−5
2	(United States) Hubert Green	68-68=136	−4
T3	(South Africa) Bobby Cole	69-68=137	−3
T3	(South Africa) Gary Player	73-64=137	−3
5	(United States) Jack Nicklaus	69-69=138	−2
6	(United States) Lee Trevino	73-66=139	−1
T7	(United States) Tommy Aaron	73-67=140	E
T7	(United States) Frank Beard	73-67=140	E
T7	(United States) Raymond Floyd	68-72=140	E
T7	(United States) Al Geiberger	70-70=140	E
T7	(United States) Leonard Thompson	69-71=140	E
T7	(United States) Sam Snead	69-71=140	E

=== Third round ===
Saturday, August 10, 1974

Lee Trevino shot 68 to take the lead at 207 (−3), while 36-hole leader John Schlee carded 75 to fall three strokes back.

Place	Player	Score	To par
1	(United States) Lee Trevino	73-66-68=207	−3
T2	(South Africa) Bobby Cole	69-68-71=208	−2
T2	(United States) Jack Nicklaus	69-69-70=208	−2
T4	(United States) Frank Beard	73-67-69=209	−1
T4	(United States) Hubert Green	68-68-73=209	−1
T6	(United States) Dave Hill	74-69-67=210	E
T6	(South Africa) Gary Player	73-64-73=210	E
T6	(United States) John Schlee	68-67-75=210	E
T6	(United States) Leonard Thompson	69-71-70=210	E
10	(United States) Sam Snead	69-71-71=211	+1

=== Final round ===
Sunday, August 11, 1974

Place	Player	Score	To par	Money ($)
1	(United States) Lee Trevino	73-66-68-69=276	−4	45,000
2	(United States) Jack Nicklaus	69-69-70-69=277	−3	25,700
T3	(South Africa) Bobby Cole	69-68-71-71=279	−1	10,957
T3	(United States) Hubert Green	68-68-73-70=279	−1	10,957
T3	(United States) Dave Hill	74-69-67-69=279	−1	10,957
T3	(United States) Sam Snead	69-71-71-68=279	−1	10,957
7	(South Africa) Gary Player	73-64-73-70=280	E	7,200
8	(United States) Al Geiberger	70-70-75-66=281	+1	6,635
T9	(United States) Don Bies	73-71-68-70=282	+2	5,850
T9	(United States) John Mahaffey	72-72-71-67=282	+2	5,850
