= List of golfers with most PGA Tour Champions wins =

This is a list of all the golfers who have won ten or more official events on the U.S.-based PGA Tour Champions (known as the Senior PGA Tour from 1980–2002 and Champions Tour from 2003–2015), the leading golf tour in the world for men aged 50 and above. The list is up to date as of November 15, 2026.

Members of the World Golf Hall of Fame are indicated by H.

Rank	Player	Lifespan	Wins	Sr. majors	Winning span
1	(Germany) Bernhard Langer H	1957–	47	12	2007–2024
2	(United States) Hale Irwin H	1945–	45	7	1995–2007
3	(United States) Lee Trevino H	1939–	29	4	1990–2000
T4	(New Zealand) Bob Charles H	1936–	25	2	1987–1996
T4	(United States) Gil Morgan	1946–	25	3	1996–2007
6	(United States) Miller Barber	1931–2013	24	5	1981–1989
T7	(United States) Don January	1929–2023	22	1	1980–1987
T7	(South Africa) Gary Player H	1935–	22	9	1985–1998
T7	(United States) Chi-Chi Rodríguez H	1935–2024	22	2	1986–1993
T10	(United States) Jim Colbert	1941–2026	20	1	1991–2001
T10	(Australia) Bruce Crampton	1935–	20	0	1986–1997
T12	(United States) George Archer	1939–2005	19	0	1989–2000
T12	(United States) Larry Nelson H	1947–	19	0	1998–2004
T14	(United States) Bruce Fleisher	1948–2021	18	1	1999–2004
T14	(United States) Jay Haas	1953–	18	3	2005–2016
T14	(United States) Mike Hill	1939–2025	18	0	1990–1996
T14	(United States) Steve Stricker	1967–	18	7	2018–2024
18	(Spain) Miguel Ángel Jiménez	1964–	17	3	2014–2025
T19	(New Zealand) Steven Alker	1971–	14	1	2021–2026
T19	(United States) Fred Couples H	1959–	14	2	2010–2022
T19	(United States) Raymond Floyd H	1942–	14	4	1992–2000
T19	(United States) Jerry Kelly	1966–	14	2	2017–2025
T19	(United States) Dave Stockton	1941–	14	3	1992–1997
T19	(United States) Tom Watson H	1949–	14	6	1999-2011
T25	(United States) Loren Roberts	1955–	13	4	2005–2012
T25	(United States) Jim Thorpe	1949–	13	1	2000–2007
T27	(United States) Jim Dent	1939–2025	12	0	1989–1998
T27	(Republic of Ireland) Pádraig Harrington H	1971–	12	4	2022–2026
T27	(United States) Tom Lehman	1959–	12	3	2009–2019
T30	(United States) Dale Douglass	1936–2022	11	1	1986–1996
T30	(United States) Allen Doyle	1948–	11	4	1999–2006
T30	(United States) Scott McCarron	1965–	11	1	2016–2019
T30	(United States) Orville Moody	1933–2008	11	2	1984–1992
T30	(United States) Bob Murphy	1943–	11	0	1993–1997
T30	(United States) Dana Quigley	1947–	11	0	1997–2006
T30	(Australia) Peter Thomson H	1929–2018	11	1	1984-1985
T37	(United States) Stewart Cink	1973–	10	2	2024–2026
T37	(United States) John Cook	1957–	10	0	2007–2014
T37	(United States) Al Geiberger	1937–	10	0	1987–1996
T37	(United States) Bob Gilder	1950–	10	0	2001–2011
T37	(United States) Tom Kite H	1949–	10	1	2000–2008
T37	(United States) Jack Nicklaus H	1940–	10	8	1990–1996
T37	(United States) Arnold Palmer H	1929–2016	10	5	1980–1988
T37	(United States) Kenny Perry	1960–	10	4	2011–2018
