= Gibby Gilbert =

American professional golfer (born 1941)

Personal information
- Full name: C. L. Gilbert II
- Nickname: Gibby
- Nationality: United States
- Born: January 14, 1941 (age 85) Chattanooga, Tennessee, U.S.
- Height: 5 ft 9 in (1.75 m)
- Weight: 190 lb (86 kg; 14 st)

Career
- Sport: Golf
- College: University of Chattanooga
- Turned professional: 1965
- Former tours: PGA Tour; Champions Tour
- Professional wins: 20

Number of wins by tour
- PGA Tour: 3
- PGA Tour Champions: 6
- Other: 11

Best results in major championships
- Masters Tournament: T2: 1980
- PGA Championship: T5: 1979
- U.S. Open: T39: 1968
- The Open Championship: DNP

C. L. "Gibby" Gilbert II (born January 14, 1941) is an American professional golfer. He played on the PGA Tour and Champions Tour.

== Early life and amateur career ==
In 1941, Gilbert was born in Chattanooga, Tennessee. The initials C. L. do not stand for anything. Gilbert's father started him in golf at the age of 13. He is a 1959 graduate of Chattanooga Central High School. Gilbert also attended the University of Chattanooga.

== Professional career ==
In 1965, Gilbert turned professional. In 1966, he took a job at Hillcrest Country Club in Hollywood, Florida.

Gilbert had success at 1967 PGA Tour Qualifying School. However, Gilbert played on the PGA Tour for three years during the 1960s but did not have much success. In late 1969, he returned to Hillcrest CC, permanently now as assistant professional.

In the early 1970s, Gilbert returned to the PGA Tour. He had dozens of top-10 finishes on the PGA Tour and three victories. His first win came at the 1970 Houston Champions International, his second win was at the 1976 Danny Thomas Memphis Classic, and his third win was at the 1977 Walt Disney World National Team Championship.

Gilbert's best finish at a major was a T-2 at the 1980 Masters, when he and Jack Newton finished four strokes behind the champion, Seve Ballesteros.

Gilbert was active on the Champions Tour, winning six times.

Gilbert has had a lifelong interest in helping young people develop their golf skills. Since 1973, he has made annual appearances for the Tennessee PGA's Junior Golf Academy at Fall Creek Falls.

== Personal life ==
Gilbert lives in Chattanooga, Tennessee. He is married to Judy. Gilbert's son, Gibby III, is a professional golfer.

== Awards and honors ==
- In 1992, Gilbert was inducted into the Tennessee Sports Hall of Fame.
- In 1995, he was also inducted into the Tennessee Golf Hall of Fame.

== Professional wins (20) ==
=== PGA Tour wins (3) ===
No.	Date	Tournament	Winning score	Margin of victory	Runner(s)-up
1	May 10, 1970	Houston Champions International	−2 (69-72-71-70=282)	Playoff	(Australia) Bruce Crampton
2	May 23, 1976	Danny Thomas Memphis Classic	−15 (68-67-66-72=273)	4 strokes	(United States) Forrest Fezler, (New Zealand) John Lister, (United States) Gil Morgan
3	Nov 6, 1977	Walt Disney World National Team Championship (with (United States) Grier Jones)	−35 (62-64-61-66=253)	1 stroke	(United States) Steve Melnyk and (United States) Andy North

PGA Tour playoff record (1–0)

No.	Year	Tournament	Opponent	Result
1	1970	Houston Champions International	(Australia) Bruce Crampton	Won with par on third extra hole

=== Other wins (9) ===
- 1979 Tennessee PGA Championship
- 1986 Tennessee Open, Tennessee PGA Championship
- 1987 Tennessee PGA Championship
- 1988 Tennessee Open, Tennessee PGA Championship
- 1989 Tennessee Open
- 1990 Tennessee Open, Tennessee PGA Championship

=== Senior PGA Tour wins (6) ===
No.	Date	Tournament	Winning score	Margin of victory	Runner(s)-up
1	Jun 28, 1992	Southwestern Bell Classic	−17 (62-65-66=193)	9 strokes	(United States) Jim Colbert
2	Jul 5, 1992	Kroger Senior Classic	−15 (66-64-68=198)	Playoff	(United States) J. C. Snead
3	Sep 6, 1992	First of America Classic	−11 (69-65-68=202)	1 stroke	(United States) Tommy Aaron, (United States) Dick Hendrickson, (South Africa) Harold Henning, (United States) Dave Stockton
4	May 2, 1993	Fairfield Barnett Classic	−12 (70-63-71=204)	1 stroke	(United States) Mike Hill
5	Sep 8, 1996	Boone Valley Classic	−10 (68-66-69=203)	Playoff	(United States) Hale Irwin
6	Feb 2 1997	Royal Caribbean Classic	−11 (70-66-66=202)	4 strokes	(Australia) David Graham

Senior PGA Tour playoff record (2–1)

No.	Year	Tournament	Opponent	Result
1	1991	First of America Classic	(South Africa) Harold Henning	Lost to birdie on first extra hole
2	1992	Kroger Senior Classic	(United States) J. C. Snead	Won with par on second extra hole
3	1996	Boone Valley Classic	(United States) Hale Irwin	Won with par on first extra hole

=== Other senior wins (2) ===
- 2011 Liberty Mutual Legends of Golf - Demaret Division (with J. C. Snead)
- 2012 Liberty Mutual Legends of Golf - Demaret Division (with J. C. Snead)

== Results in major championships ==
Tournament	1968	1969
Masters Tournament		
U.S. Open	T39	
PGA Championship		

Tournament	1970	1971	1972	1973	1974	1975	1976	1977	1978	1979
Masters Tournament		45	T38					CUT		
U.S. Open			T47	CUT		T45				
PGA Championship	T55	T6	CUT	T18	T39	T17	T34		CUT	T5

Tournament	1980	1981	1982	1983	1984	1985	1986	1987	1988
Masters Tournament	T2	T28							
U.S. Open	CUT								
PGA Championship	T68	CUT	T54	T47				CUT	65

Note: Gilbert never played in The Open Championship.

Top 10
Did not play

CUT = missed the half-way cut
"T" indicates a tie for a place

=== Summary ===
Tournament	Wins	2nd	3rd	Top-5	Top-10	Top-25	Events	Cuts made
Masters Tournament	0	1	0	1	1	1	5	4
U.S. Open	0	0	0	0	0	0	5	3
The Open Championship	0	0	0	0	0	0	0	0
PGA Championship	0	0	0	1	2	4	15	11
Totals	0	1	0	2	3	5	25	18

- Most consecutive cuts made – 6 (1968 U.S. Open – 1972 U.S. Open)
- Longest streak of top-10s – 2 (1979 PGA – 1980 Masters)

== U.S. national team appearances ==
- PGA Cup: 1988 (winners)

== See also ==
- 1967 PGA Tour Qualifying School graduates
