= Rocky Thompson (golfer) =

American professional golfer (1939–2021)

Personal information
- Full name: Hugh Delane Thompson
- Nickname: Rocky
- Nationality: United States
- Born: October 14, 1939 Shreveport, Louisiana, U.S.
- Died: March 13, 2021 (aged 81) Plano, Texas, U.S.
- Height: 5 ft 11 in (1.80 m)
- Weight: 174 lb (79 kg; 12.4 st)

Career
- Sport: Golf
- College: University of Houston
- Turned professional: 1964
- Former tours: PGA Tour; Champions Tour
- Professional wins: 4

Number of wins by tour
- PGA Tour Champions: 3
- Other: 1

Best results in major championships
- Masters Tournament: DNP
- PGA Championship: T62: 1979
- U.S. Open: T18: 1973
- The Open Championship: T52: 1978

Hugh Delane "Rocky" Thompson (October 14, 1939 – March 13, 2021) was an American professional golfer who played on the PGA Tour and the Champions Tour.

== Early life and amateur career ==
In 1939, Thompson was born in Shreveport, Louisiana. He attended the University of Houston and graduated in 1962.

== Professional career ==
In 1964, Thompson turned pro. He played on the PGA Tour for many years but never recorded a victory. His best finish was a solo second place at the 1969 Western Open.

Thompson's fortunes changed, however, once he reached the age of 50 and began competing on the Senior PGA Tour in 1990. His first win came at the 1991 MONY Syracuse Senior Classic. Thompson, who had played a combined 611 events on the PGA Tour and Senior PGA Tour, without a victory, famously said his impassioned celebratory speech:

"But now if I never, ever win a PGA Tour event, right now, this minute, today, this week—" Thompson paused, his short soliloquy becoming louder with each enunciated syllable. He then hit his crescendo when he thrust his hips a little for effect, threw his fist in the air and yelled—screamed even— "I am the man!"

Later that same year, he won at the Digital Seniors Classic. In 1994, he won the GTE Suncoast Classic. He holds or shares several Champions Tour records.

== Personal life ==
Thompson was mayor of Toco, Texas, in the 1990s. He died on March 13, 2021, at the age of 81.

== Professional wins (4) ==
=== Regular wins (1) ===
- 1978 Greater Bangor Open

=== Senior PGA Tour wins (3) ===
| No. | Date | Tournament | Winning score | Margin of victory | Runner-up |
|---|---|---|---|---|---|
| 1 | Jun 16, 1991 | MONY Syracuse Senior Classic | −17 (62-68-69=199) | 1 stroke | (United States) Jim Dent |
| 2 | Sep 15, 1991 | Digital Seniors Classic | −11 (66-69-70=205) | 1 stroke | (Australia) Bruce Crampton |
| 3 | Feb 13, 1994 | GTE Suncoast Classic | −15 (73-67-61=201) | 1 stroke | (United States) Raymond Floyd |

== See also ==
- Spring 1978 PGA Tour Qualifying School graduates
- Fall 1981 PGA Tour Qualifying School graduates
