= Jim Colbert =

American professional golfer (1941–2026)

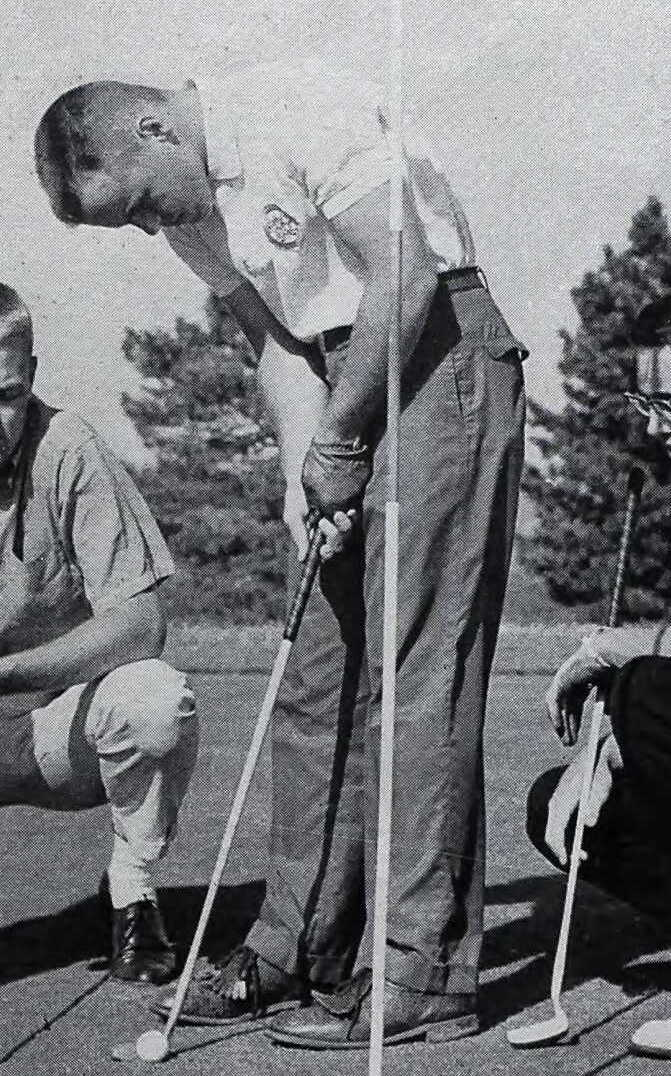
- Colbert in 1962

Personal information
- Full name: James Joseph Colbert
- Nationality: United States
- Born: March 9, 1941 Elizabeth, New Jersey, U.S.
- Died: May 10, 2026 (aged 85)
- Height: 5 ft 9 in (1.75 m)
- Weight: 175 lb (79 kg; 12.5 st)

Career
- Sport: Golf
- College: Kansas State University
- Turned professional: 1965
- Former tours: PGA Tour; Champions Tour
- Professional wins: 35

Number of wins by tour
- PGA Tour: 8
- PGA Tour Champions: 20 (Tied-10th all-time)
- Other: 6 (regular); 1 (senior)

Best results in major championships
- Masters Tournament: T4: 1974
- PGA Championship: T12: 1973
- U.S. Open: T3: 1971
- The Open Championship: CUT: 1984

Achievements and awards
- Senior PGA Tour Rookie of the Year: 1991
- Senior PGA Tour money list winner: 1995, 1996
- Senior PGA Tour Player of the Year: 1995, 1996
- Senior PGA Tour Comeback Player of the Year: 1998

James Joseph Colbert (March 9, 1941 – May 10, 2026) was an American professional golfer.

== Early life and amateur career ==
Colbert was born in Elizabeth, New Jersey, on March 9, 1941. He attended Kansas State University on a football scholarship, but after sustaining an injury he turned to golf. In 1964, he finished second in the NCAA golf championships. Colbert graduated in 1965.

== Professional career ==
In 1965, Colbert turned professional. Colbert won eight times on the PGA Tour, including twice in 1983 when he finished a career best fifteenth on the money list. He played in 44 major championships, collecting three top-five finishes.

As a senior Colbert won 20 tournaments on the Champions Tour, including a senior major championship, the 1993 Senior Players Championship.

Colbert worked as a golf analyst for ESPN and had his own golf course management company based in Pahrump, Nevada. He also helped design a golf course in Manhattan, Kansas, named Colbert Hills, which was ranked by Golfweek as the best public course in Kansas, and by Golf Digest as the eighth-best course overall in the state.

Colbert was known for wearing a distinctive bucket hat on the golf course.

=== Thoroughbred racing ===
With an interest in thoroughbred racing, in 1993 Colbert purchased a racemare named Fit to Lead in partnership with Connie Sczesny and the Chairman of Hollywood Park Racetrack, Randall D. Hubbard. Trained by U.S. Racing Hall of Fame inductee Richard Mandella for the three partners, Fit to Lead won several graded stakes including the Princess Stakes at Hollywood Park plus at Churchill Downs, the Fleur de Lis Stakes and Louisville Budweiser Breeders' Cup Handicap.

== Death ==
Colbert died on May 10, 2026, at the age of 85.

== Awards and honors ==
Colbert is enshrined in the: Kansas State Athletic Hall of Fame (1991), Kansas Sports Hall of Fame (1998), Kansas City Golf Hall of Fame (2018), Las Vegas Golf Hall of Fame (2019), and the Southern Nevada Sports Hall of Fame (2000).

== Professional wins (35) ==
=== PGA Tour wins (8) ===
No.	Date	Tournament	Winning score	Margin of victory	Runner(s)-up
1	Mar 18, 1969	Monsanto Open Invitational	−17 (69-67-64-67=267)	2 strokes	(United States) Deane Beman
2	Jul 16, 1972	Greater Milwaukee Open	−13 (66-67-69-69=271)	1 stroke	(United States) Buddy Allin, (United States) Chuck Courtney, (United States) George Johnson, (United States) Grier Jones
3	Mar 18, 1973	Greater Jacksonville Open	−9 (70-65-71-73=279)	1 stroke	(United States) Lou Graham, (United States) Johnny Miller, (United States) Dan Sikes, (United States) Jim Wiechers
4	Jun 23, 1974	American Golf Classic	+1 (70-67-74-70=281)	Playoff	(United States) Gay Brewer, (United States) Forrest Fezler, (United States) Raymond Floyd
5	Oct 26, 1975	Walt Disney World National Team Championship (with (United States) Dean Refram)	−36 (63-63-62-64=252)	3 strokes	(South Africa) Bobby Cole and (United States) John Schlee, (Mexico) Victor Regalado and (United States) Charlie Sifford
6	Feb 19, 1980	Joe Garagiola-Tucson Open	−22 (66-68-66-70=270)	4 strokes	(Canada) Dan Halldorson
7	May 15, 1983	Colonial National Invitation	−2 (69-67-70-72=278)	Playoff	(United States) Fuzzy Zoeller
8	Oct 2, 1983	Texas Open	−19 (66-62-66-67=261)	5 strokes	(United States) Mark Pfeil

PGA Tour playoff record (2–0)

No.	Year	Tournament	Opponent(s)	Result
1	1974	American Golf Classic	(United States) Gay Brewer, (United States) Forrest Fezler, (United States) Raymond Floyd	Won with par on second extra hole Brewer and Fezler eliminated by par on first hole
2	1983	Colonial National Invitation	(United States) Fuzzy Zoeller	Won with par on sixth extra hole

=== Other wins (1) ===
- 1987 Jerry Ford Invitational

=== Senior PGA Tour wins (20) ===
Legend
Senior PGA Tour major championships (1)
Tour Championships (1)
Other Senior PGA Tour (18)

No.	Date	Tournament	Winning score	Margin of victory	Runner(s)-up
1	Jun 30, 1991	Southwestern Bell Classic	−9 (66-67-68=201)	3 strokes	(United States) Al Geiberger, (United States) Larry Laoretti
2	Oct 6, 1991	Vantage Championship	−11 (68-70-67=205)	1 stroke	(United States) George Archer, (United States) Jim Dent, (United States) Gibby Gilbert
3	Dec 8, 1991	First Development Kaanapali Classic	−15 (66-61-68=195)	2 strokes	(United States) Dale Douglass
4	Feb 16, 1992	GTE Suncoast Classic	−13 (66-70-64=200)	Playoff	(United States) George Archer
5	Oct 4, 1992	Vantage Championship (2)	−12 (65-67=132) (Note: Shortened to 36 holes due to weather.)	2 strokes	(United States) Jim Dent
6	Feb 7, 1993	Royal Caribbean Classic	−14 (65-64-70=199)	1 stroke	(United States) Raymond Floyd, (United States) Al Geiberger
7	Jun 27, 1993	Ford Senior Players Championship	−10 (67-72-70-69=278)	1 stroke	(United States) Raymond Floyd
8	Jul 10, 1994	Kroger Senior Classic	−14 (66-64-69=199)	2 strokes	(United States) Raymond Floyd
9	Jul 25, 1994	Southwestern Bell Classic (2)	−14 (68-63-65=196)	2 strokes	(Japan) Isao Aoki, (United States) Larry Gilbert
10	Jan 15, 1995	Senior Tournament of Champions	−7 (72-66-71=209)	Playoff	(United States) Jim Albus
11	Apr 30, 1995	Las Vegas Senior Classic	−11 (65-71-69=205)	2 strokes	(United States) Jim Dent, (United States) Raymond Floyd, (United States) Rocky Thompson
12	May 21, 1995	Bell Atlantic Classic	−3 (68-71-68=207)	1 stroke	(United States) J. C. Snead
13	Nov 6, 1995	Energizer Senior Tour Championship	−6 (68-69-71-74=282)	1 stroke	(United States) Raymond Floyd
14	Mar 17, 1996	Toshiba Senior Classic	−12 (68-65-68=201)	2 strokes	(United States) Bob Eastwood
15	Apr 28, 1996	Las Vegas Senior Classic (2)	−9 (63-74-70=207)	Playoff	(New Zealand) Bob Charles, (United States) Dave Stockton
16	May 12, 1996	Nationwide Championship	−10 (71-66-69=206)	3 strokes	(Japan) Isao Aoki
17	Sep 29, 1996	Vantage Championship (3)	−9 (65-70-69=204)	1 stroke	(United States) Hale Irwin, (South Africa) Gary Player
18	Oct 20, 1996	Raley's Gold Rush Classic	−14 (67-68-67=202)	5 strokes	(United States) Dave Stockton
19	Oct 11, 1998	The Transamerica	−11 (70-68-67=205)	1 stroke	(United States) David Lundstrom
20	Mar 11, 2001	SBC Senior Classic	−12 (67-67-70=204)	1 stroke	(Spain) José María Cañizares

Senior PGA Tour playoff record (3–5)

No.	Year	Tournament	Opponent(s)	Result
1	1991	Murata Reunion Pro-Am	(United States) Chi-Chi Rodríguez	Lost to par on fourth extra hole
2	1992	GTE Suncoast Classic	(United States) George Archer	Won with birdie on fourth extra hole
3	1992	Vintage ARCO Invitational	(United States) Tommy Aaron, (United States) Mike Hill	Hill won with birdie on first extra hole
4	1993	First of America Classic	(United States) George Archer, (United States) Chi-Chi Rodríguez	Archer won with par on third extra hole Rodríguez eliminated by par on first hole
5	1994	GTE West Classic	(United States) Jay Sigel	Lost to birdie on fourth extra hole
6	1995	Senior Tournament of Champions	(United States) Jim Albus	Won with birdie on third extra hole
7	1996	Las Vegas Senior Classic	(New Zealand) Bob Charles, (United States) Dave Stockton	Won with par on fourth extra hole Charles eliminated by par on first hole
8	1998	Cadillac NFL Golf Classic	(United States) Bob Dickson, (United States) Larry Nelson	Dickson won with birdie on first extra hole

=== Other senior wins (6) ===
- 1995 Diners Club Matches (with Bob Murphy)
- 1996 Diners Club Matches (with Bob Murphy)
- 2000 Liberty Mutual Legends of Golf (with Andy North)
- 2001 Liberty Mutual Legends of Golf (with Andy North)
- 2013 Liberty Mutual Insurance Legends of Golf - Demaret Division (with Bob Murphy)
- 2014 Big Cedar Lodge Legends of Golf - Legends Division (with Jim Thorpe)

== Results in major championships ==
Tournament	1967	1968	1969
Masters Tournament			
U.S. Open	CUT		CUT
The Open Championship			
PGA Championship			WD

Tournament	1970	1971	1972	1973	1974	1975	1976	1977	1978	1979
Masters Tournament			CUT	T43	T4	CUT	T12	T14	T32	
U.S. Open	CUT	T3	T63	10	T5	CUT	T55		CUT	T41
The Open Championship										
PGA Championship	CUT	T46	CUT	T12	T28	T28	T57		69	T46

Tournament	1980	1981	1982	1983	1984	1985	1986	1987
Masters Tournament	T14	T25			CUT			
U.S. Open	T47	T26		WD	T38			CUT
The Open Championship					CUT			
PGA Championship	T30	T56	T16	T36	T25	CUT	CUT	

Top 10
Did not play

WD = withdrew
CUT = missed the half-way cut (3rd round cut in 1984 Open Championship)
"T" indicates a tie for a place

=== Summary ===
Tournament	Wins	2nd	3rd	Top-5	Top-10	Top-25	Events	Cuts made
Masters Tournament	0	0	0	1	1	5	10	7
U.S. Open	0	0	1	2	3	3	16	9
The Open Championship	0	0	0	0	0	0	1	0
PGA Championship	0	0	0	0	0	3	17	12
Totals	0	0	1	3	4	11	44	28

- Most consecutive cuts made – 10 (1978 PGA – 1982 PGA)
- Longest streak of top-10s – 2 (1974 Masters – 1974 U.S. Open)

== Results in The Players Championship ==
Tournament	1974	1975	1976	1977	1978	1979	1980	1981	1982	1983	1984	1985	1986	1987
The Players Championship	CUT	WD	T43	CUT	8	T28	T14	T4	CUT	66	T20	T33	T21	WD

Top 10

CUT = missed the halfway cut
WD = withdrew
"T" indicates a tie for a place

== Senior major championships ==
=== Wins (1) ===
Year	Championship	Winning score	Margin	Runner-up
1993	Ford Senior Players Championship	−10 (67-72-70-69=278)	1 stroke	(United States) Raymond Floyd

== U.S. national team appearances ==
Professional

- Wendy's 3-Tour Challenge (representing Senior PGA Tour): 1996
- Gillette Tour Challenge Championship: 1997 (winners with Nick Price and Kelly Robbins)

== See also ==
- 1965 PGA Tour Qualifying School graduates
- List of golfers with most PGA Tour Champions wins
