= Napa Valley Championship =

The Napa Valley Championship was a golf tournament on the Champions Tour from 1989 to 2002. It was played in Napa, California at the Silverado Country Club.

The purse for the 2002 tournament was US$1,300,000, with $195,000 going to the winner. The tournament was founded in 1989 as the Transamerica Senior Golf Championship.

== Winners ==
Napa Valley Championship presented by Beringer Vineyards

- 2002 Tom Kite

The Transamerica

- 2001 Sammy Rachels
- 2000 Jim Thorpe
- 1999 Bruce Fleisher
- 1998 Jim Colbert
- 1997 Dave Eichelberger
- 1996 John Bland
- 1995 Lee Trevino
- 1994 Kermit Zarley
- 1993 Dave Stockton

Transamerica Senior Golf Championship

- 1992 Bob Charles
- 1991 Charles Coody
- 1990 Lee Trevino
- 1989 Billy Casper
