= RJR Championship =

The RJR Championship was a golf tournament on the Champions Tour from 1987 to 2002. It was played in Clemmons, North Carolina at Tanglewood Park.

The purse for the 2002 tournament was US$1,600,000, with $240,000 going to the winner. The tournament was founded in 1987 as the Vantage Championship with Vantage cigarettes as the sponsor, although it switched to the corporate-branded RJR Championship in 1989 and 2002, the latter due to the Tobacco Master Settlement Agreement; R.J. Reynolds Tobacco Company were restricted to one sports sponsorship in the rulings developed by the settlement, to which the company opted to choose NASCAR Winston Cup Series as the cigarette-branded sponsorship that lasted until 2003.

== Winners ==
RJR Championship

- 2002 Bruce Fleisher

Vantage Championship

- 2001 canceled due to the September 11, 2001 attacks
- 2000 Larry Nelson
- 1999 Fred Gibson
- 1998 Gil Morgan
- 1997 Hale Irwin
- 1996 Jim Colbert
- 1995 Hale Irwin
- 1994 Larry Gilbert
- 1993 Lee Trevino
- 1992 Jim Colbert
- 1991 Jim Colbert
- 1990 Charles Coody

RJR Championship

- 1989 Gary Player

Vantage Championship

- 1988 Walt Zembriski
- 1987 Al Geiberger
