= Las Vegas Senior Classic =

Golf tournament

The Las Vegas Senior Classic was a golf tournament on the Champions Tour from 1986–2001. It was played in Las Vegas, Nevada at the Desert Inn Country Club (1986–1993) and at the TPC at The Canyons, now known as TPC Las Vegas, from 1994–2001.

The purse for the 2001 tournament was US$1,400,000, with $210,000 going to the winner.

== Winners ==
Las Vegas Senior Classic

- 2001 Bruce Fleisher

Las Vegas Senior Classic presented by TruGreen-Chemlawn

- 2000 Larry Nelson
- 1999 Vicente Fernández
- 1998 Hale Irwin
- 1997 Hale Irwin

Las Vegas Senior Classic

- 1996 Jim Colbert
- 1995 Jim Colbert
- 1994 Raymond Floyd
- 1993 Gibby Gilbert
- 1992 Lee Trevino
- 1991 Chi-Chi Rodríguez
- 1990 Chi-Chi Rodríguez

General Tires Las Vegas Classic

- 1989 Charles Coody
- 1988 Larry Mowry

Las Vegas Senior Classic

- 1987 Al Geiberger
- 1986 Bruce Crampton
