= Nationwide Championship =

The Nationwide Championship was a golf tournament on the Senior PGA Tour from 1991 to 2000. It was played in Alpharetta, Georgia, United States, at the Country Club of the South (1991–1994) and at the Golf Club of Georgia (1995–2000).

The purse for the 2000 tournament was US$1,450,000, with $217,500 going to the winner.

== Winners ==
- 2000 Hale Irwin
- 1999 Hale Irwin
- 1998 John Jacobs
- 1997 Graham Marsh
- 1996 Jim Colbert
- 1995 Bob Murphy
- 1994 Dave Stockton
- 1993 Lee Trevino
- 1992 Isao Aoki
- 1991 Mike Hill
