= Royal Caribbean Golf Classic =

Champions Tour golf tournament

The Royal Caribbean Golf Classic was a golf tournament on the Champions Tour from 1987 to 2004. It was played in late January/early February in Key Biscayne, Florida at the Crandon Park Golf Club (1997–2004) and at The Links at Key Biscayne (1987–1996). It was played using the tradition stroke play format except in 2000 and 2001 when it used the Modified Stableford scoring system.

The purse for the 2004 tournament was US$1,450,000, with $217,500 going to the winner. The tournament was founded in 1987 as the Gus Machado Senior Classic.

At the 1998 Royal Caribbean Classic, David Graham defeated Dave Stockton on the tenth hole of a sudden-death playoff. It was the longest sudden-death playoff in Champions Tour history.

== Winners ==
- 2004 Bruce Fleisher
- 2003 Dave Barr

Royal Caribbean Classic

- 2002 John Jacobs
- 2001 Larry Nelson
- 2000 Bruce Fleisher
- 1999 Bruce Fleisher
- 1998 David Graham
- 1997 Gibby Gilbert
- 1996 Bob Murphy
- 1995 J. C. Snead
- 1994 Lee Trevino
- 1993 Jim Colbert
- 1992 Don Massengale
- 1991 Gary Player
- 1990 Lee Trevino

Gus Machado Senior Classic

- 1989 No tournament
- 1988 Lee Elder
- 1987 Gene Littler
