= Encompass Insurance Pro-Am of Tampa Bay =

The Encompass Insurance Pro-Am of Tampa Bay was a golf tournament on the Champions Tour. It was played annually in April in Lutz, Florida at the TPC Tampa Bay. Outback Steakhouse was the main sponsor of the tournament from 2004 to 2011.

The purse for the 2012 tournament was US$1,600,000, with $240,000 going to the winner. The tournament was founded in 1988 as the GTE Suncoast Classic.

== Winners ==
Encompass Insurance Pro-Am of Tampa Bay

- 2012 Michael Allen

Outback Steakhouse Pro-Am

- 2011 John Cook
- 2010 Bernhard Langer
- 2009 Nick Price
- 2008 Tom Watson
- 2007 Tom Watson
- 2006 Jerry Pate
- 2005 Hale Irwin
- 2004 Mark McNulty

Verizon Classic

- 2003 Bruce Fleisher
- 2002 Doug Tewell
- 2001 Bob Gilder

GTE Classic

- 2000 Bruce Fleisher
- 1999 Larry Nelson
- 1998 Jim Albus
- 1997 David Graham

GTE Suncoast Classic

- 1996 Jack Nicklaus
- 1995 Dave Stockton
- 1994 Rocky Thompson
- 1993 Jim Albus
- 1992 Jim Colbert
- 1991 Bob Charles
- 1990 Mike Hill
- 1989 Bob Charles
- 1988 Dale Douglass
