= Doug Sanders Celebrity Classic =

The Doug Sanders Celebrity Classic was a golf tournament on the Champions Tour from 1988 to 1994. It was played in Kingwood, Houston, Texas at the Deerwood Club.

The purse for the 1994 tournament was US$500,000, with $75,000 going to the winner. The tournament was founded in 1988 as the Doug Sanders Kingwood Celebrity Classic.

== Winners ==
Doug Sanders Celebrity Classic

- 1994 Tom Wargo
- 1993 Bob Charles

Doug Sanders Kingwood Celebrity Classic

- 1992 Mike Hill
- 1991 Mike Hill
- 1990 Lee Trevino
- 1989 Homero Blancas
- 1988 Chi-Chi Rodríguez
