= List of Champions Tour major championship winning golfers =

This article lists all the men who have won senior golf's major championships. The tallies do not include wins in the Senior PGA Championship and the Senior British Open before they became senior majors. The five majors are shown in the order in which they are currently played each year. There is a complete list of results in the senior majors article. The list is up to date through the 2026 season.

Rank	Player	Span	Total	The Tradition	Senior PGA Championship	Senior Players Championship	U.S. Senior Open	The Senior Open Championship
1	(Germany) Bernhard Langer	2010–2023	12	2	1	3	2	4
2	(South Africa) Gary Player	1986–1997	9	–	3	1	2	3
3	(United States) Jack Nicklaus	1990–1996	8	4	1	1	2	–
T4	(United States) Hale Irwin	1996–2004	7	–	4	1	2	–
T4	(United States) Steve Stricker	2019–2023	7	3	1	2	1	–
6	(United States) Tom Watson	2001–2011	6	1	2	–	–	3
T7	(United States) Miller Barber	1981–1985	5	–	1	1	3	–
T7	(United States) Arnold Palmer	1980–1985	5	–	2	2	1	–
T9	(United States) Allen Doyle	1999–2006	4	–	1	1	2	–
T9	(United States) Raymond Floyd	1994–2000	4	1	1	2	–	–
T9	(Republic of Ireland) Pádraig Harrington	2022–2026	4	-	-	–	3	1
T9	(United States) Kenny Perry	2013–2017	4	1	–	1	2	–
T9	(United States) Loren Roberts	2005–2009	4	1	–	1	–	2
T9	(United States) Lee Trevino	1990–1994	4	1	2	–	1	–
T15	(Germany) Alex Čejka	2021–2023	3	1	1	–	–	1
T15	(United States) Fred Funk	2008–2010	3	2	–	–	1	–
T15	(United States) Jay Haas	2006–2009	3	–	2	1	–	–
T15	(Spain) Miguel Ángel Jiménez	2018–2025	3	1	–	1	–	1
T15	(United States) Jerry Kelly	2020–2026	3	–	–	2	–	1
T15	(United States) Tom Lehman	2010–2012	3	2	1	–	–	–
T15	(Scotland) Colin Montgomerie	2014–2015	3	–	2	–	1	–
T15	(United States) Gil Morgan	1997–1998	3	2	-	1	-	–
T15	(United States) Dave Stockton	1992–1996	3	–	–	2	1	-
T23	(Scotland) Brian Barnes	1995–1996	2	–	–	–	–	2
T23	(England) Richard Bland	2024	2	–	1	–	1	–
T23	(England) Paul Broadhurst	2016–2018	2	–	1	–	–	1
T23	(Argentina) Ángel Cabrera	2025–2025	2	1	1	–	-	–
T23	(United States) Billy Casper	1983–1988	2	–	–	1	1	–
T23	(England) Roger Chapman	2012	2	–	1	–	1	–
T23	(New Zealand) Bob Charles	1989–1993	2	–	–	–	–	2
T23	(United States) Stewart Cink	2026	2	1	1	–	–	–
T23	(United States) Fred Couples	2011–2012	2	–	–	1	–	1
T23	(United States) Peter Jacobsen	2004–2005	2	–	–	1	1	–
T23	(United States) Don January	1980–1983	2	–	2	–	–	–
T23	(Australia) Graham Marsh	1997–1999	2	1	–	–	1	–
T23	(United States) Jeff Maggert	2015	2	1	–	–	1	–
T23	(United States) Orville Moody	1989	2	–	–	1	1	–
T23	(Republic of Ireland) Christy O'Connor Jnr	1999–2000	2	–	–	–	–	2
T23	(United States) Mike Reid	2005–2009	2	1	1	–	–	–
T23	(United States) Chi-Chi Rodríguez	1996–1997	2	–	1	1	–	–
T23	(Argentina) Eduardo Romero	2006–2008	2	1	–	–	1	–
T23	(United States) Craig Stadler	2003–2004	2	1	–	1	–	–
T23	(United States) Doug Tewell	2000–2001	2	1	1	–	–	–
T23	(United States) Tom Wargo	1993–1994	2	–	1	–	–	1

- 1 senior major: Jim Albus, Steven Alker, Michael Allen, Doug Barron, Don Bies, Olin Browne, Brad Bryant, K. J. Choi, Darren Clarke, Russ Cochran, Jim Colbert, Neil Coles, Joe Daley, Marco Dawson, Roberto De Vicenzo, Dale Douglass, Dave Eichelberger, Ernie Els, Bruce Fleisher, John Fourie, David Frost, Jim Furyk, Larry Gilbert, Stewart Ginn, Retief Goosen, Simon Hobday, Brian Huggett, Kōki Idoki, John Jacobs, Mark James, Zach Johnson, Tom Kite, Larry Laoretti, Bruce Lietzke, Scott McCarron, Mark McNulty, Rocco Mediate, Larry Mowry, Pete Oakley, Mark O'Meara, Don Pooley, Gene Sauers, Tom Shaw, Vijay Singh, J. C. Snead, Ian Stanley, Noboru Sugai, Ken Tanigawa, Peter Thomson, Jim Thorpe, David Toms, Bruce Vaughan, Bobby Verwey, Bobby Wadkins, Tom Wargo, Denis Watson, D. A. Weibring, Tom Weiskopf, Mark Wiebe, Fuzzy Zoeller
