= 2002 Senior PGA Tour =

Golf tour season

2002 Senior PGA Tour season
- Duration: January 18, 2002 – October 27, 2002
- Number of official events: 36
- Most wins: (United States) Bob Gilder (4) (United States) Hale Irwin (4)
- Charles Schwab Cup: (United States) Hale Irwin
- Money list: (United States) Hale Irwin
- Player of the Year: (United States) Hale Irwin
- Rookie of the Year: (United States) Morris Hatalsky

The 2002 Senior PGA Tour was the 23rd season of the Senior PGA Tour, the main professional golf tour in the United States for men aged 50 and over.

== Schedule ==
The following table lists official events during the 2002 season.

Date	Tournament	Location	Purse (US$)	Winner (Note: The number in parentheses after each winner's name is the number of Senior PGA Tour events they had won up to and including that tournament. This information is only shown for Senior PGA Tour members.)	Notes
Jan 20	MasterCard Championship	Hawaii	1,500,000	(United States) Tom Kite (4)	
Feb 3	Royal Caribbean Classic	Florida	1,450,000	(United States) John Jacobs (4)	
Feb 10	ACE Group Classic	Florida	1,500,000	(United States) Hale Irwin (33)	
Feb 17	Verizon Classic	Florida	1,500,000	(United States) Doug Tewell (5)	
Feb 24	Audi Senior Classic	Mexico	1,700,000	(United States) Bruce Lietzke (3)	
Mar 3	SBC Senior Classic	California	1,450,000	(United States) Tom Kite (5)	
Mar 10	Toshiba Senior Classic	California	1,500,000	(United States) Hale Irwin (34)	
Mar 17	Siebel Classic in Silicon Valley	California	1,400,000	(United States) Dana Quigley (6)	
Mar 31	Emerald Coast Classic	Florida	1,450,000	(United States) Dave Eichelberger (6)	
Apr 7	Liberty Mutual Legends of Golf	Florida	2,505,000	(United States) Doug Tewell (6)	New to Senior PGA Tour
Apr 28	The Countrywide Tradition	Arizona	2,000,000	(United States) Jim Thorpe (5)	Senior PGA Tour major championship
May 5	Bruno's Memorial Classic	Alabama	1,400,000	(United States) Sammy Rachels (3)	
May 12	TD Waterhouse Championship	Missouri	1,600,000	(United States) Bruce Lietzke (4)	
May 19	Instinet Classic	New Jersey	1,500,000	(Japan) Isao Aoki (9)	
May 26	Farmers Charity Classic	Michigan	1,500,000	(United States) Jay Sigel (7)	
Jun 2	NFL Golf Classic	New Jersey	1,300,000	(United States) James Mason (1)	
Jun 9	Senior PGA Championship	Ohio	2,000,000	(United States) Fuzzy Zoeller (1)	Senior major championship
Jun 16	BellSouth Senior Classic	Tennessee	1,600,000	(United States) Gil Morgan (21)	
Jun 23	Greater Baltimore Classic	Maryland	1,450,000	(United States) J. C. Snead (4)	
Jun 30	U.S. Senior Open	Maryland	2,500,000	(United States) Don Pooley (1)	Senior major championship
Jul 7	AT&T Canada Senior Open Championship	Canada	1,600,000	(United States) Tom Jenkins (3)	
Jul 14	Ford Senior Players Championship	Michigan	2,500,000	(Australia) Stewart Ginn (1)	Senior PGA Tour major championship
Jul 21	SBC Senior Open	Illinois	1,450,000	(United States) Bob Gilder (3)	
Jul 28	Senior British Open	Northern Ireland	£500,000	(Japan) Noboru Sugai (n/a)	Senior major championship (Note: Unofficial money event at the time, but retrospectively counted as an official win.)
Jul 28	FleetBoston Classic	Massachusetts	1,500,000	(United States) Bob Gilder (4)	
Aug 4	Lightpath Long Island Classic	New York	1,700,000	(United States) Hubert Green (4)	
Aug 11	3M Championship	Minnesota	1,750,000	(United States) Hale Irwin (35)	
Aug 25	Uniting Fore Care Classic	Utah	1,500,000	(United States) Morris Hatalsky (1)	
Sep 1	Allianz Championship	Iowa	1,850,000	(United States) Bob Gilder (5)	
Sep 8	Kroger Senior Classic	Ohio	1,500,000	(United States) Bob Gilder (6)	
Sep 15	RJR Championship	North Carolina	1,600,000	(United States) Bruce Fleisher (15)	
Sep 22	SAS Championship	North Carolina	1,700,000	(United States) Bruce Lietzke (5)	
Oct 6	Turtle Bay Championship	Hawaii	1,500,000	(United States) Hale Irwin (36)	
Oct 13	Napa Valley Championship	California	1,300,000	(United States) Tom Kite (6)	
Oct 20	SBC Championship	Texas	1,450,000	(United States) Dana Quigley (7)	
Oct 27	Senior Tour Championship	Oklahoma	2,500,000	(United States) Tom Watson (4)	Tour Championship

=== Unofficial events ===
The following events were sanctioned by the Senior PGA Tour, but did not carry official money, nor were wins official.

Date	Tournament	Location	Purse ($)	Winners	Notes
Nov 17	UBS Cup	Georgia	3,000,000	Team USA	Team event
Dec 15	Office Depot Father/Son Challenge	Florida	1,000,000	(United States) Craig Stadler and son Kevin Stadler	Team event

== Charles Schwab Cup ==
The Charles Schwab Cup was based on tournament results during the season, calculated using a points-based system.

Position	Player	Points
1	(United States) Hale Irwin	2,886
2	(United States) Bob Gilder	2,087
3	(United States) Bruce Fleisher	1,582
4	(United States) Tom Watson	1,448
5	(United States) Tom Kite	1,419

== Money list ==
The money list was based on prize money won during the season, calculated in U.S. dollars.

Position	Player	Prize money ($)
1	(United States) Hale Irwin	3,028,304
2	(United States) Bob Gilder	2,367,637
3	(United States) Bruce Fleisher	1,860,534
4	(United States) Tom Kite	1,631,930
5	(United States) Doug Tewell	1,579,988

== Awards ==
Award	Winner	Ref.
Player of the Year (Jack Nicklaus Trophy)	(United States) Hale Irwin	
Rookie of the Year	(United States) Morris Hatalsky	
Scoring leader (Byron Nelson Award)	(United States) Hale Irwin	
Comeback Player of the Year	(United States) Hubert Green	
