= 2005 Champions Tour =

Golf tour season

2005 Champions Tour season
- Duration: January 21, 2005 – October 30, 2005
- Number of official events: 28
- Most wins: (United States) Hale Irwin (4)
- Charles Schwab Cup: (United States) Tom Watson
- Money list: (United States) Dana Quigley
- Player of the Year: (United States) Dana Quigley
- Rookie of the Year: (United States) Jay Haas

The 2005 Champions Tour was the 26th season of the Champions Tour (formerly the Senior PGA Tour), the main professional golf tour in the United States for men aged 50 and over.

== Schedule ==
The following table lists official events during the 2005 season.

Date	Tournament	Location	Purse (US$)	Winner (Note: The number in parentheses after each winner's name is the number of Champions Tour events they had won up to and including that tournament. This information is only shown for Champions Tour members.)	Notes
Jan 23	MasterCard Championship	Hawaii	1,600,000	(United States) Dana Quigley (9)	
Jan 30	Turtle Bay Championship	Hawaii	1,500,000	(United States) Hale Irwin (41)	
Feb 20	ACE Group Classic	Florida	1,600,000	(England) Mark James (2)	
Feb 28	Outback Steakhouse Pro-Am	Florida	1,600,000	(United States) Hale Irwin (42)	Pro-Am
Mar 13	SBC Classic	California	1,550,000	(Republic of Ireland) Des Smyth (1)	
Mar 20	Toshiba Senior Classic	California	1,650,000	(United States) Mark Johnson (1)	
Apr 24	Liberty Mutual Legends of Golf	Georgia	2,250,000	(Republic of Ireland) Des Smyth (2)	
May 1	FedEx Kinko's Classic	Texas	1,650,000	(United States) Jim Thorpe (10)	
May 16	Blue Angels Classic	Florida	1,500,000	(United States) Jim Thorpe (11)	
May 22	Bruno's Memorial Classic	Alabama	1,500,000	(United States) D. A. Weibring (3)	
May 29	Senior PGA Championship	Pennsylvania	2,000,000	(United States) Mike Reid (1)	Senior major championship
Jun 5	Allianz Championship	Iowa	1,500,000	(United States) Tom Jenkins (6)	
Jun 13	Bayer Advantage Classic	Kansas	1,650,000	(United States) Dana Quigley (10)	
Jun 26	Bank of America Championship	Massachusetts	1,600,000	(Republic of Ireland) Mark McNulty (4)	
Jul 3	Commerce Bank Championship	New York	1,500,000	(United States) Ron Streck (1)	
Jul 10	Ford Senior Players Championship	Michigan	2,500,000	(United States) Peter Jacobsen (2)	Champions Tour major championship
Jul 24	The Senior British Open Championship	Scotland	1,800,000	(United States) Tom Watson (7)	Senior major championship
Jul 31	U.S. Senior Open	Ohio	2,600,000	(United States) Allen Doyle (10)	Senior major championship
Aug 7	3M Championship	Minnesota	1,750,000	(United States) Tom Purtzer (3)	
Aug 21	Boeing Greater Seattle Classic	Washington	1,600,000	(United States) David Eger (2)	
Aug 28	JELD-WEN Tradition	Oregon	2,500,000	(United States) Loren Roberts (1)	Champions Tour major championship
Sep 4	Wal-Mart First Tee Open at Pebble Beach	California	2,000,000	(United States) Hale Irwin (43)	
Sep 18	Constellation Energy Classic	Maryland	1,700,000	(United States) Bob Gilder (8)	
Oct 2	SAS Championship	North Carolina	1,900,000	(United States) Hale Irwin (44)	
Oct 9	Greater Hickory Classic at Rock Barn	North Carolina	1,600,000	(United States) Jay Haas (1)	
Oct 16	Administaff Small Business Classic	Texas	1,600,000	(Republic of Ireland) Mark McNulty (5)	
Oct 23	SBC Championship	Texas	1,550,000	(United States) Jay Haas (2)	
Oct 30	Charles Schwab Cup Championship	California	2,500,000	(United States) Tom Watson (8)	Tour Championship

=== Unofficial events ===
The following events were sanctioned by the Champions Tour, but did not carry official money, nor were wins official.

Date	Tournament	Location	Purse ($)	Winners	Notes
Dec 4	MBNA WorldPoints Father/Son Challenge	Florida	1,000,000	(Germany) Bernhard Langer and son Stefan Langer	Team event

== Charles Schwab Cup ==
The Charles Schwab Cup was based on tournament results during the season, calculated using a points-based system.

Position	Player	Points
1	(United States) Tom Watson	2,980
2	(United States) Dana Quigley	2,733
3	(Republic of Ireland) Mark McNulty	2,210
4	(United States) Hale Irwin	2,001
5	(United States) Loren Roberts	1,846

== Money list ==
The money list was based on prize money won during the season, calculated in U.S. dollars.

Position	Player	Prize money ($)
1	(United States) Dana Quigley	2,170,258
2	(United States) Hale Irwin	1,983,596
3	(Republic of Ireland) Mark McNulty	1,791,452
4	(United States) D. A. Weibring	1,550,030
5	(United States) Tom Watson	1,532,482

== Awards ==
Award	Winner	Ref.
Player of the Year (Jack Nicklaus Trophy)	(United States) Dana Quigley	
Rookie of the Year	(United States) Jay Haas	
Scoring leader (Byron Nelson Award)	(Republic of Ireland) Mark McNulty	
Comeback Player of the Year	(United States) Peter Jacobsen	
