= Allen Doyle =

American professional golfer (born 1948)

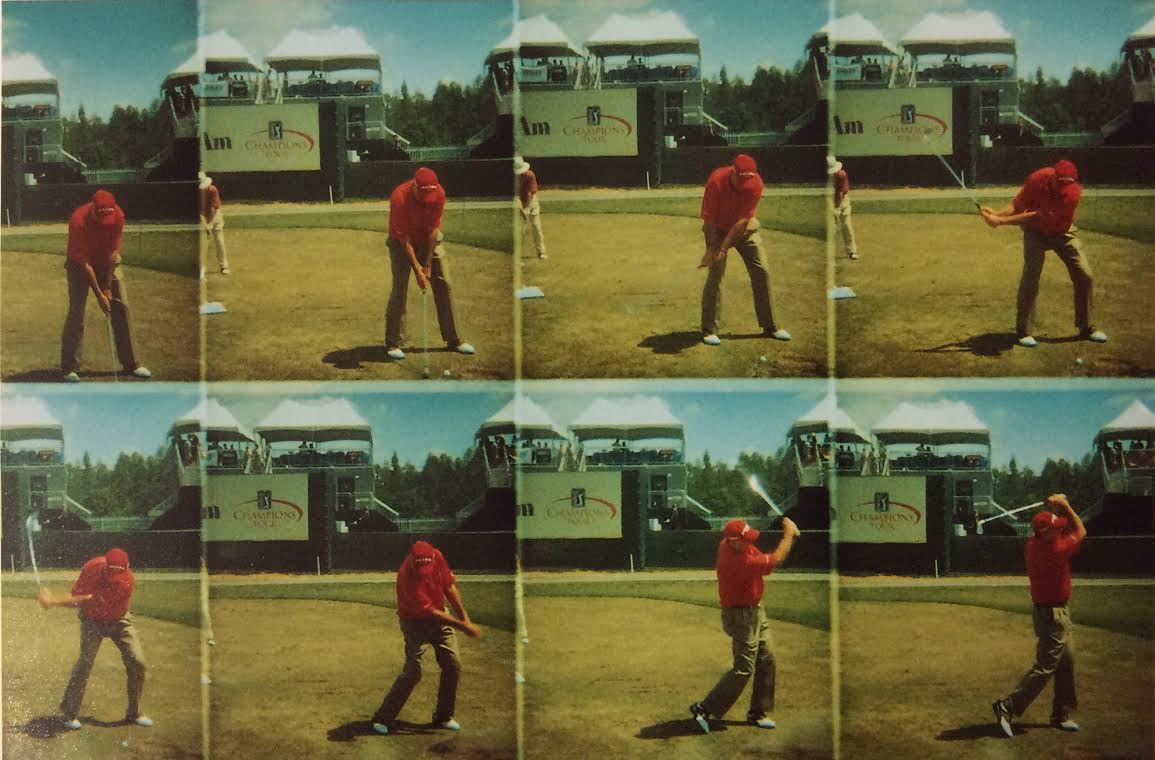
- Allen Doyle Golf Swing

Personal information
- Full name: Allen Michael Doyle
- Nickname: The Grip
- Nationality: United States
- Born: July 26, 1948 (age 78) Woonsocket, Rhode Island, U.S.
- Height: 6 ft 3 in (1.91 m)
- Weight: 210 lb (95 kg; 15 st)
- Spouse: Kate Doyle
- Children: 2

Career
- Sport: Golf
- College: Norwich University
- Turned professional: 1995
- Current tour: Champions Tour
- Former tour: PGA Tour
- Professional wins: 19

Number of wins by tour
- Korn Ferry Tour: 3
- PGA Tour Champions: 11
- Other: 5

Best results in major championships
- Masters Tournament: DNP
- PGA Championship: DNP
- U.S. Open: CUT: 1991, 2006, 2007
- The Open Championship: DNP

Achievements and awards
- Senior PGA Tour Charles Schwab Cup winner: 2001
- Senior PGA Tour money list winner: 2001
- Senior PGA Tour Player of the Year: 2001

Allen Michael Doyle (born July 26, 1948) is an American professional golfer. Though a talented golfer, Doyle elected not to turn pro after graduating from Vermont's Norwich University. He moved to the south where he owned and operated a driving range in Georgia. In his free time he played in elite amateur events, winning the Georgia Amateur and Sunnehanna Amateur several times each. At the age of 46, Doyle turned professional and had extraordinary success as a pro, winning three events on the Nike Tour and 11 events on the Champions Tour, including the U.S. Senior Open twice.

== Early life ==
Doyle was born in Woonsocket, Rhode Island. He raised in the Boston suburb of Norwood, Massachusetts. He attended Catholic Memorial High School in West Roxbury, Massachusetts.

== Amateur career ==
Doyle attended Norwich University in Vermont. He currently hosts an annual golf tournament to benefit the Norwich Hockey Team. During his time at Norwich he finished runner-up at the Massachusetts Amateur, losing to Peter Drooker, 1 up, in the finals.

Doyle moved to the south after college and settled in Georgia. He won the Georgia Amateur and Sunnehanna Amateur several times over the course of his amateur career.

== Professional career ==
At the age of 46, Doyle turned professional. In 1995, his first full professional season, he won three times on the Nike Tour. From 1996 to 1998 Doyle competed in 58 PGA Tour events, making the cut in 31, including two top-10 finishes.

Doyle became eligible to play on the Senior PGA Tour when he turned 50 in July 1998 and won four official money events in 1999, including the Senior PGA Championship. In 2001, he won his second senior major, the Senior Players Championship, and led the tour on the money list. In 2005, he claimed a third major at the U.S. Senior Open, coming behind from a nine stroke deficit with a 63 in the final round. He successfully defended his U.S. Senior Open title in 2006 by defeating Tom Watson at Prairie Dunes Country Club and becoming the oldest U.S. Senior Open Champion at 57 years, 11 months and 17 days. His career earnings on the Champions Tour at the time of his retirement is listed as $13,401,250.

Doyle owns and operates The Doyle Golf Center driving range in La Grange, Georgia. As a philanthropist, Doyle has donated over $1,000,000 to various charities including family members of slain rescuers of the 9/11 attacks.

== Awards and honors ==
- Doyle is a member of the Georgia Sports Hall of Fame.
- Doyle is a member of the Georgia Golf Hall of Fame.

== Amateur wins ==
- 1978 Georgia Amateur
- 1979 Georgia Amateur
- 1982 Georgia Amateur
- 1984 Georgia Mid-Amateur
- 1986 Georgia Mid-Amateur
- 1987 Georgia Amateur, Georgia Mid-Amateur
- 1988 Georgia Amateur, Georgia Mid-Amateur, Rice Planters Amateur
- 1989 Sunnehanna Amateur, Georgia Mid-Amateur
- 1990 Sunnehanna Amateur, Georgia Amateur, Rice Planters Amateur
- 1991 Cardinal Amateur
- 1992 Sunnehanna Amateur
- 1993 Northeast Amateur
- 1994 Dogwood Invitational, Sunnehanna Amateur, Porter Cup, Cardinal Amateur, Rice Planters Amateur

== Professional wins (19) ==
=== Nike Tour wins (3) ===
Legend
Tour Championships (1)
Other Nike Tour (2)

No.	Date	Tournament	Winning score	Margin of victory	Runner-up
1	Apr 9, 1995	Nike Mississippi Gulf Coast Classic	−15 (66-70-67-70=273)	Playoff	(United States) Franklin Langham
2	Aug 27, 1995	Nike Texarkana Open	−19 (66-70-66-66=269)	1 stroke	(United States) Gary Rusnak
3	Oct 22, 1995	Nike Tour Championship	−5 (72-68-72-71=283)	Playoff	(United States) John Maginnes

Nike Tour playoff record (2–0)

No.	Year	Tournament	Opponent	Result
1	1995	Nike Mississippi Gulf Coast Classic	(United States) Franklin Langham	Won with par on second extra hole
2	1995	Nike Tour Championship	(United States) John Maginnes	Won with par on first extra hole

=== Champions Tour wins (11) ===
Legend
Champions Tour major championships (4)
Other Champions Tour (7)

No.	Date	Tournament	Winning score	Margin of victory	Runner(s)-up
1	Feb 28, 1999	ACE Group Classic	−13 (64-70-69=203)	5 strokes	(Argentina) Vicente Fernández
2	Apr 18, 1999	PGA Seniors' Championship	−14 (70-71-69-64=274)	2 strokes	(Argentina) Vicente Fernández
3	Jun 6, 1999	Cadillac NFL Golf Classic	−12 (67-66-71=204)	Playoff	(United States) Joe Inman
4	Sep 5, 1999	TD Waterhouse Championship	−12 (66-70-65=198)	2 strokes	(United States) Ed Dougherty
5	Mar 5, 2000	Toshiba Senior Classic	−6 (67-69=136)*	1 stroke	(United States) Jim Thorpe, (United States) Howard Twitty
6	Jul 15, 2001	Ford Senior Players Championship	−15 (67-69-70-67=273)	Playoff	(United States) Doug Tewell
7	Jul 29, 2001	State Farm Senior Classic	−11 (73-65-67=205)	Playoff	(United States) Bruce Fleisher
8	Aug 3, 2003	FleetBoston Classic	−15 (68-63-67=198)	3 strokes	(United States) Bruce Fleisher, (United States) Bob Gilder
9	Jun 13, 2004	Bayer Advantage Celebrity Pro-Am	−13 (65-66=131)*	1 stroke	(United States) Jerry Pate
10	Jul 31, 2005	U.S. Senior Open	−10 (71-67-73-63=274)	1 stroke	(United States) Loren Roberts, (United States) D. A. Weibring
11	Jul 9, 2006	U.S. Senior Open (2)	−8 (69-68-67-68=272)	2 strokes	(United States) Tom Watson

*Note: Tournament shortened to 36 holes due to weather.

Champions Tour playoff record (3–2)

No.	Year	Tournament	Opponent(s)	Result
1	1999	Toshiba Senior Classic	(United States) Al Geiberger, (United States) John Jacobs, (United States) Gary McCord	McCord won with birdie on fifth extra hole Doyle and Geiberger eliminated by eagle on first hole
2	1999	Cadillac NFL Golf Classic	(United States) Joe Inman	Won with birdie on fourth extra hole
3	2001	NFL Golf Classic	(United States) John Schroeder	Lost to par on second extra hole
4	2001	Ford Senior Players Championship	(United States) Doug Tewell	Won with par on first extra hole
5	2001	State Farm Senior Classic	(United States) Bruce Fleisher	Won with par on third extra hole

=== Other senior wins (5) ===
- 1999 Senior Slam
- 2001 Senior Slam, Hyundai Team Matches (with Dana Quigley)
- 2002 Hyundai Team Matches (with Dana Quigley)
- 2017 Bass Pro Shops Legends of Golf – Legends Division (with Hubert Green)

== Results in major championships ==
Tournament	1991	1992	1993	1994	1995	1996	1997	1998	1999
U.S. Open	CUT								

Tournament	2000	2001	2002	2003	2004	2005	2006	2007
U.S. Open							CUT	CUT

CUT = missed the halfway cut
Note: Allen only played in the U.S. Open.

== Senior major championships ==
=== Wins (4) ===
Year	Championship	Winning score	Margin	Runner(s)-up
1999	PGA Seniors' Championship	−14 (71-71-68-64=274)	2 strokes	(Argentina) Vicente Fernández
2001	Ford Senior Players Championship	−15 (67-69-70-67=273)	Playoff	(United States) Doug Tewell
2005	U.S. Senior Open	−10 (71-67-73-63=274)	1 stroke	(United States) Loren Roberts, (United States) D. A. Weibring
2006	U.S. Senior Open (2)	−8 (69-68-67-68=272)	2 strokes	(United States) Tom Watson

=== Results timeline ===
Results not in chronological order before 2012.

Tournament	1999	2000	2001	2002	2003	2004	2005	2006	2007	2008	2009	2010	2011	2012
Senior PGA Championship	1	T17	4	T15	T7	T13	T6	T23	T68	T53	T57			
The Tradition	68		T10	T16	T42	T2	T36	T25	73	T52	T25	65	T53	T67
Senior Players Championship	T19	T12	1	T12	T15	T9	T5	T45	T46	T59	T43			
U.S. Senior Open	T13	T8	T4	T7	T4	T42	1	1	CUT	CUT	CUT	T38		CUT

Win
Top 10
Did not play

CUT = missed the halfway cut
"T" indicates a tie for a place
Note: Allen never played in The Senior Open Championship.

== U.S. national team appearances ==
Amateur

- Eisenhower Trophy: 1990, 1992, 1994 (team winners and individual leader)
- Walker Cup: 1989 (injured, did not play), 1991 (winners), 1993 (winners)

== See also ==
- 1995 Nike Tour graduates
- 1996 PGA Tour Qualifying School graduates
- List of golfers with most Champions Tour major championship wins
- List of golfers with most Champions Tour wins
- Champions Tour awards
