= Jim Thorpe (golfer) =

American professional golfer (born 1949)

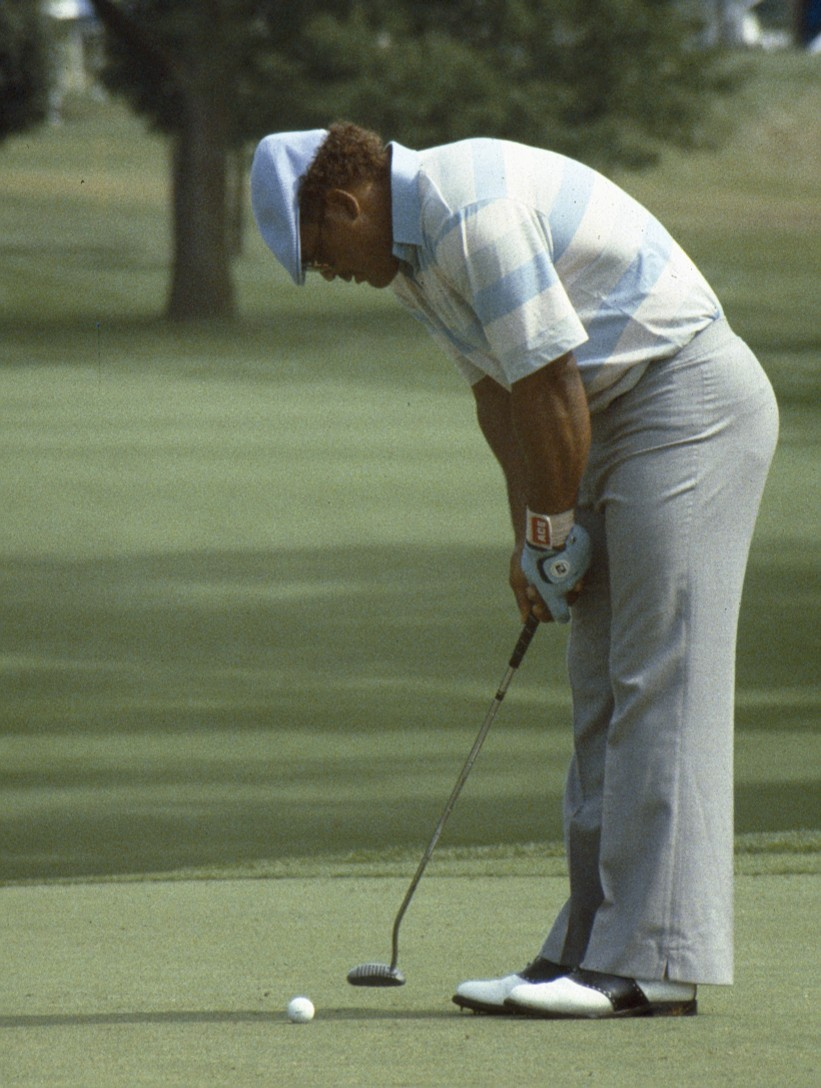

Personal information
- Full name: Jimmy Lee Thorpe
- Nationality: United States
- Born: February 1, 1949 (age 77) Roxboro, North Carolina, U.S.
- Height: 6 ft 0 in (1.83 m)
- Weight: 205 lb (93 kg; 14.6 st)

Career
- Sport: Golf
- College: Morgan State University
- Turned professional: 1972
- Former tours: PGA Tour; Champions Tour
- Professional wins: 21

Number of wins by tour
- PGA Tour: 3
- PGA Tour Champions: 13
- Other: 5

Best results in major championships
- Masters Tournament: T18: 1985
- PGA Championship: T7: 1986
- U.S. Open: T4: 1984
- The Open Championship: CUT: 1986, 1987

Jimmy Lee Thorpe (born February 1, 1949) is an American retired professional golfer, who last played on the Champions Tour.

== Early life ==
Thorpe was born in Roxboro, North Carolina, the ninth of the twelve children of a fairway superintendent. He attended Morgan State University in Baltimore, Maryland.

== Professional career ==
In 1972, Thorpe turned professional. He won three times on the PGA Tour in the mid-1980s. He has surpassed this at senior level by winning over ten times on the Senior PGA Tour, including one senior major championship, the 2002 Tradition. He made the top ten of the senior tour's career money list in 2004.

== Personal life ==
Thorpe's late success has been clouded by charges filed in federal court in Orlando, Florida, charging him with failure to pay $1.6 million in taxes between the years 2002 and 2004. After his lawyer stated that Thorpe intended to plead innocent to the charges. However, Thorpe pleaded guilty in September 2009. On January 22, 2010, Thorpe was sentenced to one year in prison for the crime.

Thorpe was released from prison on January 17, 2011. He was under suspension by the PGA Tour until March 31. He then resumed his career on the Champions Tour.

== Professional wins (21) ==
=== PGA Tour wins (3) ===
No.	Date	Tournament	Winning score	Margin of victory	Runner-up
1	Sep 15, 1985	Greater Milwaukee Open	−14 (73-69-62-70=274)	3 strokes	(United States) Jack Nicklaus
2	Oct 27, 1985	Seiko-Tucson Match Play Championship	4 and 3		(United States) Jack Renner
3	Nov 2, 1986	Seiko-Tucson Match Play Championship (2)	−5 (67)	4 strokes	(United States) Scott Simpson

PGA Tour playoff record (0–1)

No.	Year	Tournament	Opponent	Result
1	1985	Western Open	(United States) Scott Verplank	Lost to par on second extra hole

=== Other wins (4) ===
- 1982 Labatt's International
- 1991 Amoco Centel Championship, Jamaica Open
- 1993 Jerry Ford Invitational (tie with Jay Delsing, and Donnie Hammond)

=== Champions Tour wins (13) ===
Legend
Champions Tour major championships (1)
Tour Championships (3)
Other Champions Tour (9)

No.	Date	Tournament	Winning score	Margin of victory	Runner(s)-up
1	Oct 8, 2000	The Transamerica	−18 (67-66-65=198)	3 strokes	(United States) Bruce Fleisher
2	Oct 15, 2000	Gold Rush Classic	−21 (67-62-66=195)	2 strokes	(United States) Ed Dougherty
3	Sep 2, 2001	Kroger Senior Classic	−14 (65-65=130) (Note: Shortened to 36 holes due to weather.)	Playoff	(United States) Tom Jenkins
4	Sep 9, 2001	Allianz Championship	−14 (68-65-66=199)	2 strokes	(United States) Gil Morgan
5	Apr 28, 2002	The Countrywide Tradition	−11 (67-70-70-70=277)	Playoff	(United States) John Jacobs
6	Aug 17, 2003	Long Island Classic	−15 (68-60-67=195)	1 stroke	(United States) Bob Gilder
7	Oct 26, 2003	Charles Schwab Cup Championship	−20 (63-67-70-68=268)	3 strokes	(United States) Tom Watson
8	Jun 6, 2004	Farmers Charity Classic	−13 (67-70-66=203)	1 stroke	(United States) Fred Gibson
9	Jul 4, 2004	Commerce Bank Long Island Classic (2)	−9 (65-67-69=201)	1 stroke	(United States) Andy Bean, (United States) Wayne Levi, (United States) Bobby Wadkins
10	May 1, 2005	FedEx Kinko's Classic	−10 (69-69-68=206)	4 strokes	(United States) Dana Quigley
11	May 16, 2005	Blue Angels Classic	−16 (63-64-67=194)	Playoff	(United States) Morris Hatalsky
12	Oct 19, 2006	Charles Schwab Cup Championship (2)	−17 (67-70-67-68=271)	2 strokes	(United States) Tom Kite
13	Oct 28, 2007	Charles Schwab Cup Championship (3)	−20 (64-69-69-66=268)	3 strokes	(United States) Fred Funk, (Zimbabwe) Denis Watson

Champions Tour playoff record (3–1)

No.	Year	Tournament	Opponent	Result
1	1999	Bell Atlantic Classic	(United States) Tom Jenkins	Lost to birdie on first extra hole
2	2001	Kroger Senior Classic	(United States) Tom Jenkins	Won with birdie on first extra hole
3	2002	The Countrywide Tradition	(United States) John Jacobs	Won with birdie on first extra hole
4	2005	Blue Angels Classic	(United States) Morris Hatalsky	Won with birdie on third extra hole

=== Other senior wins (1) ===
- 2014 Big Cedar Lodge Legends of Golf - Legends Division (with Jim Colbert)

== Results in major championships ==
Tournament	1979	1980	1981	1982	1983	1984	1985	1986	1987	1988	1989
Masters Tournament				CUT		CUT	T18	T45	T42	WD	
U.S. Open			T11	T30	T13	T4	T34	CUT	T9	CUT	
The Open Championship								CUT	CUT		
PGA Championship	CUT		T39	T34	T14	T59		T7	CUT		

Tournament	1990	1991	1992	1993	1994	1995	1996
Masters Tournament							
U.S. Open				CUT	CUT		T97
The Open Championship							
PGA Championship	CUT						

Top 10
Did not play

CUT = missed the half-way cut
WD = withdrew
"T" indicates a tie for a place

=== Summary ===
Tournament	Wins	2nd	3rd	Top-5	Top-10	Top-25	Events	Cuts made
Masters Tournament	0	0	0	0	0	1	6	3
U.S. Open	0	0	0	1	2	4	11	7
The Open Championship	0	0	0	0	0	0	2	0
PGA Championship	0	0	0	0	1	2	8	5
Totals	0	0	0	1	3	7	27	15

- Most consecutive cuts made – 4 (twice)
- Longest streak of top-10s – 1 (three times)

== Results in The Players Championship ==
Tournament	1979	1980	1981	1982	1983	1984	1985	1986	1987	1988	1989	1990	1991	1992	1993	1994	1995
The Players Championship	T28	T45	74	T32	T54	T10	CUT	T4	CUT			WD	CUT			T62	CUT

Top 10
Did not play

CUT = missed the halfway cut
WD = withdrew
"T" indicates a tie for a place

== Senior major championships ==
=== Wins (1) ===
Year	Championship	Winning score	Margin	Runner-up
2002	The Countrywide Tradition	−11 (67-70-70-70=277)	Playoff	(United States) John Jacobs

=== Results timeline ===
Results not in chronological order before 2016.

Tournament	1999	2000	2001	2002
The Tradition	T7	T15	T19	1
Senior PGA Championship	T34	T32	2	T4
Senior Players Championship	T22	T10	T26	T2
U.S. Senior Open	T27	T6	T21	T11

Tournament	2003	2004	2005	2006	2007	2008	2009	2010	2011	2012	2013	2014	2015	2016
The Tradition	T7	T14	T67	T36	T40	T18	T31		T49	T47	T28	T74		T52
Senior PGA Championship	T60	CUT	T19	T14	T52	T71	CUT		CUT	CUT	CUT			
Senior Players Championship	T2	T7	T45	2	T46	T47	T53		T55	T53				
Senior British Open Championship														
U.S. Senior Open	T30	T19	CUT	T20	T22	T29	T32		T37	CUT				

The Senior British Open was not a Champions Tour major until 2003.

Win
Top 10
Did not play

CUT = missed the halfway cut
"T" indicates a tie for a place

== See also ==
- Fall 1975 PGA Tour Qualifying School graduates
- Fall 1978 PGA Tour Qualifying School graduates
- List of golfers with most Champions Tour wins
