= Raymond Floyd =

American professional golfer (born 1942)

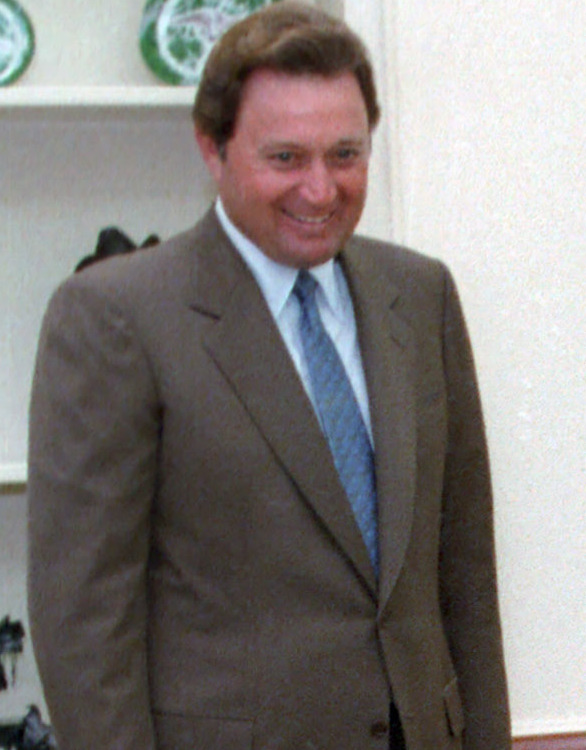
- Floyd in 1986

Personal information
- Full name: Raymond Loran Floyd
- Nationality: United States
- Born: September 4, 1942 (age 84) Fort Bragg, North Carolina, U.S.
- Height: 6 ft 1 in (1.85 m)
- Weight: 200 lb (91 kg; 14 st)
- Spouses: Maria Fraietta Floyd (m. 1973; died 2012) Jennifer Thompson (m. 2021)
- Children: 3

Career
- Sport: Golf
- College: University of North Carolina
- Turned professional: 1961
- Former tours: PGA Tour; Champions Tour
- Professional wins: 63
- Highest ranking: 11 (January 11, 1987)

Number of wins by tour
- PGA Tour: 22
- European Tour: 4
- Japan Golf Tour: 1
- PGA Tour Champions: 14
- Other: 14 (regular); 12 (senior)

Best results in major championships (wins: 4)
- Masters Tournament: Won: 1976
- PGA Championship: Won: 1969, 1982
- U.S. Open: Won: 1986
- The Open Championship: T2: 1978

Achievements and awards
- World Golf Hall of Fame: 1989 (member page)
- Byron Nelson Award: 1983
- Vardon Trophy: 1983
- Senior PGA Tour Byron Nelson Award: 1994, 1995
- Senior PGA Tour Comeback Player of the Year: 2000

Raymond Loran Floyd (born September 4, 1942) is an American retired professional golfer who has won numerous tournaments on both the PGA Tour and Senior PGA Tour, including four majors and four senior majors. He was inducted into the World Golf Hall of Fame in 1989.

== Early life and amateur career ==
Floyd was born on September 4, 1942, in Fort Bragg, North Carolina, and was raised in Fayetteville. Floyd's father L.B. had a 21-year career in the U.S. Army, much of it at Fort Bragg as the golf pro at its enlisted-men's course. He also owned a nearby driving range where Raymond and younger sister Marlene, a future LPGA Tour pro, honed their games. From an early age, Floyd could play equally well left-handed, and used his skills to enhance his allowance, winning money from soldiers on the course, as well as civilians in nearby towns.

Floyd graduated from Fayetteville High School (now named Terry Sanford High School) in 1960. Skilled in golf and baseball, he had an offer to pitch in the Cleveland Indians organization, but chose to attend the University of North Carolina in Chapel Hill, but only stayed for a semester.

== Professional career ==
After leaving college, Floyd turned professional in 1961, and quickly established himself on the PGA Tour. His first victory came two years later at age 20 in March 1963 in Florida, winning $3,500 at the St. Petersburg Open Invitational, the first of his 22 wins on the PGA Tour, including four major championships.

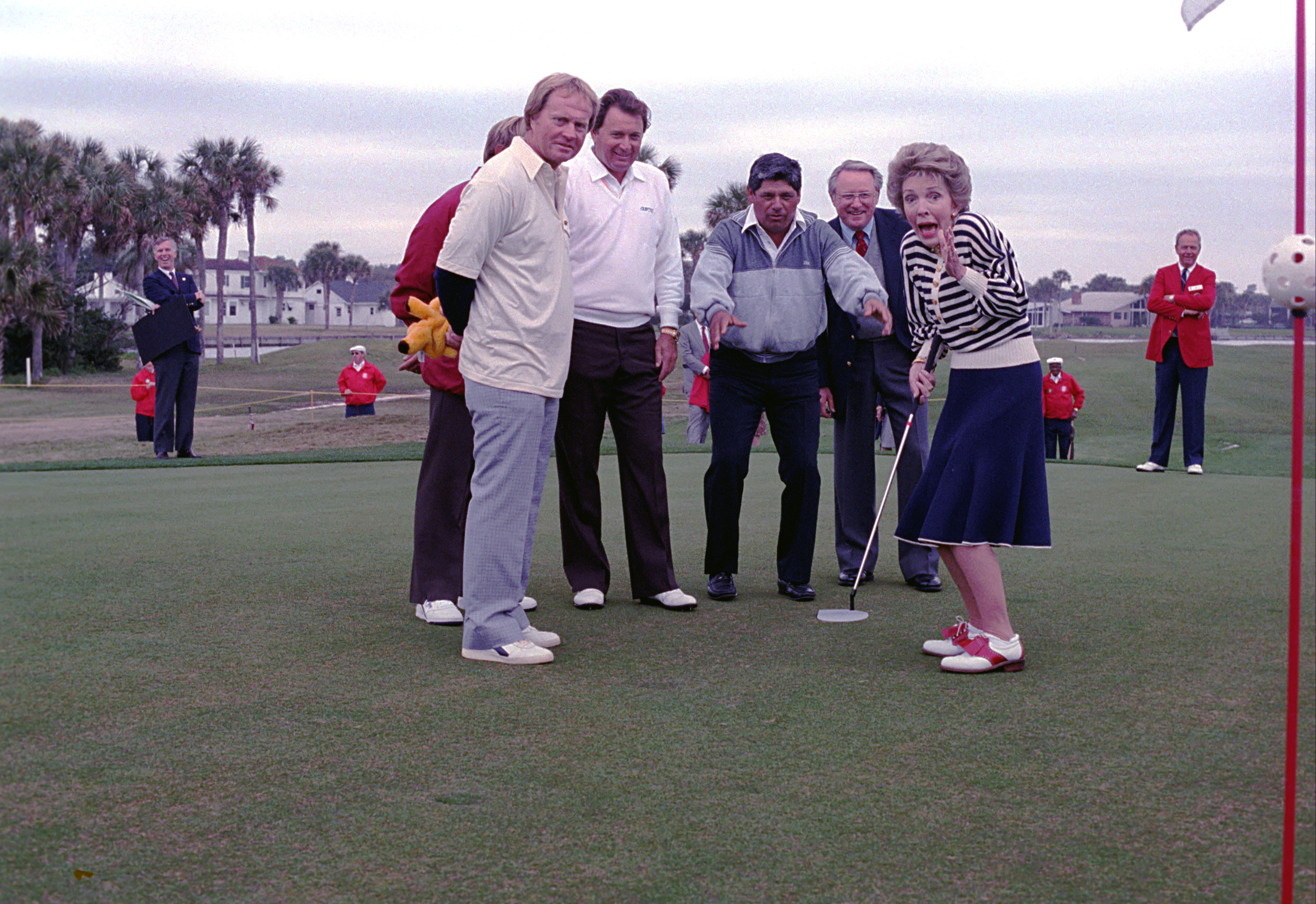
Nancy Reagan reacting to a putt with Jack Nicklaus, Lee Trevino, and Raymond Floyd in 1987

Floyd won his first major title six years later at the PGA Championship in 1969, and the second came in 1976 at The Masters, by an eight-stroke margin and was won wire-to-wire. He won his second PGA Championship in 1982, after shooting a opening round of 63 in sweltering hot conditions at Southern Hills Country Club. Floyd's round of 63 was the lowest round in a major championship until 2017. Floyd finished 1982 ranked second in Mark McCormack's world golf rankings, behind only Tom Watson, who had won two majors that season; had those rankings been calculated over just two seasons, on a par with the system in place at the end of 2012, Floyd would have been ranked world number one in 1982, as he had earned more points from all events in total than Watson in both 1981 and 1982.

Floyd's fourth and final major title came at the U.S. Open in 1986 at Shinnecock Hills. After three rounds, he was tied for fifth place, three shots behind leader Greg Norman, who held the 54-hole lead at all four majors in 1986. Norman faltered on Sunday with a 75 (+5), but Floyd shot 66 to win by two strokes and became the then-oldest U.S. Open champion by a few months at 43 years and 9 months. (The record was Ted Ray's since 1920, and is now held by Hale Irwin, a champion at age 45 in 1990.)

The one major title that eluded Floyd, which prevented him from completing the career grand slam, was The Open Championship. His best result was in 1978 at St Andrews; he tied for second place, behind three-time winner Jack Nicklaus.

Floyd came very close to winning a second Green Jacket at the 1990 Masters, where he lost in a playoff to Nick Faldo. On the second playoff hole, Floyd pulled a 7-iron shot into the pond left of the 11th green. Afterward, he said, "This is the most devastating thing that's ever happened to me in my career. I've had a lot of losses, but nothing like this."

In 1992, Floyd again finished runner-up at The Masters, two strokes behind the winner Fred Couples. Floyd's final win on the PGA Tour came at the Doral-Ryder Open in 1992 at age 49, making him one of the oldest players to win a PGA Tour event. The Doral-Ryder Open victory also gave him the distinction of winning PGA Tour events in four decades, joining Sam Snead as the second player to achieve that feat. Floyd also won on the Senior PGA Tour (now PGA Tour Champions) later that season, making him the first player to win on both tours in the same year.

At the end of 1992, Floyd was ranked 14th on the Official World Golf Ranking at the age of 50, one of the highest positions ever attained by a player of that age. Floyd's successful run continued on the Senior Tour, with 14 wins between 1992 and 2000, including four senior majors and two Senior Tour Championships.

In addition to Floyd's victories on the PGA and Champions Tours, he won at least 24 additional tournaments around the world, taking his total victory tally to at least 60 events. While active, Floyd was considered by most golf experts to be the best at chipping the golf ball. He holed many shots from just off the green, the most famous may have been at the Doral-Eastern Open in 1980, where his successful birdie chip on the second hole of a sudden-death playoff defeated Jack Nicklaus.

On his decision to continue playing professional golf on the Senior Tour, Floyd spoke with Golf Digest and mused aloud: "Why do I enjoy golf after 31 years, going out there and doing things that are necessary to be competitive—having practice, having to work, having to dedicate yourself? I guess it comes down to the competition. My personality...I'm not going to play if I'm not competitive."

Floyd won the Vardon Trophy for lowest scoring average on the PGA Tour in 1983 and played for the U.S. on eight Ryder Cup teams (1969, 1975, 1977, 1981, 1983, 1985, 1991, and 1993).

Floyd was inducted into the World Golf Hall of Fame in 1989. He captained the U.S. Ryder Cup team at The Belfry in England in 1989. At a gala dinner held before the start of the matches, Floyd famously introduced his American side as "The 12 greatest players in the world." This irritated European player Nick Faldo of England, who later said that he felt Floyd's comment was inappropriate.

Floyd was an assistant Ryder Cup captain in 2008. On the eve of the Masters in 2010, Floyd announced his retirement from competitive golf. He was the honoree at Nicklaus' Memorial Tournament in 2013.

== Professional wins (63) ==
=== PGA Tour wins (22) ===
Legend
Major championships (4)
Players Championships (1)
Other PGA Tour (17)

No.	Date	Tournament	Winning score	To par	Margin of victory	Runner(s)-up
1	Mar 17, 1963	St. Petersburg Open Invitational	67-71-67-69=274	−14	1 stroke	(United States) Dave Marr
2	Jun 27, 1965	St. Paul Open Invitational	66-70-65-69=270	−14	4 strokes	(United States) Tommy Aaron, (United States) Gene Littler
3	Mar 23, 1969	Greater Jacksonville Open	68-71-68-71=278	−10	Playoff	(United States) Gardner Dickinson
4	Jul 27, 1969	American Golf Classic	67-68-68-65=268	−12	4 strokes	(United States) Bobby Nichols
5	Aug 17, 1969	PGA Championship	69-66-67-74=276	−8	1 stroke	(South Africa) Gary Player
6	Jun 8, 1975	Kemper Open	65-71-73-69=278	−10	3 strokes	(United States) John Mahaffey, (South Africa) Gary Player
7	Apr 11, 1976	Masters Tournament	65-66-70-70=271	−17	8 strokes	(United States) Ben Crenshaw
8	Sep 12, 1976	World Open Golf Championship	69-67-67-71=274	−10	Playoff	(United States) Jerry McGee
9	May 8, 1977	Byron Nelson Golf Classic	69-70-68-69=276	−8	2 strokes	(United States) Ben Crenshaw
10	Jul 17, 1977	Pleasant Valley Classic	67-68-67-69=271	−12	1 stroke	(United States) Jack Nicklaus
11	Apr 8, 1979	Greater Greensboro Open	73-71-71-67=282	−6	1 stroke	(United States) George Burns, (South Africa) Gary Player
12	Mar 16, 1980	Doral-Eastern Open	74-69-70-66=279	−9	Playoff	(United States) Jack Nicklaus
13	Mar 15, 1981	Doral-Eastern Open (2)	66-68-71-68=273	−15	1 stroke	(United States) Keith Fergus, (Australia) David Graham
14	Mar 23, 1981	Tournament Players Championship	72-74-71-68=285	−3	Playoff	(United States) Barry Jaeckel, (United States) Curtis Strange
15	Jun 14, 1981	Manufacturers Hanover Westchester Classic	70-68-68-69=275	−9	2 strokes	(United States) Bobby Clampett, (United States) Gibby Gilbert, (United States) Craig Stadler
16	May 30, 1982	Memorial Tournament	74-69-67-71=281	−7	2 strokes	(United States) Peter Jacobsen, (United States) Wayne Levi, (United States) Roger Maltbie, (United States) Gil Morgan
17	Jun 13, 1982	Danny Thomas Memphis Classic	67-68-67-69=271	−17	6 strokes	(United States) Mike Holland
18	Aug 8, 1982	PGA Championship (2)	63-69-68-72=272	−8	3 strokes	(United States) Lanny Wadkins
19	Apr 28, 1985	Houston Open	69-70-69-69=277	−11	1 stroke	(South Africa) David Frost, (United States) Bob Lohr
20	Jun 15, 1986	U.S. Open	75-68-70-66=279	−1	2 strokes	(United States) Chip Beck, (United States) Lanny Wadkins
21	Oct 19, 1986	Walt Disney World/Oldsmobile Classic	68-66-70-71=275	−13	Playoff	(United States) Lon Hinkle, (United States) Mike Sullivan
22	Mar 8, 1992	Doral-Ryder Open (3)	67-67-67-70=271	−17	2 strokes	(United States) Keith Clearwater, (United States) Fred Couples

PGA Tour playoff record (5–10)

No.	Year	Tournament	Opponent(s)	Result
1	1969	Greater Jacksonville Open	(United States) Gardner Dickinson	Won with birdie on first extra hole
2	1971	Bob Hope Desert Classic	(United States) Arnold Palmer	Lost to birdie on second extra hole
3	1973	Bing Crosby National Pro-Am	(United States) Orville Moody, (United States) Jack Nicklaus	Nicklaus won with birdie on first extra hole
4	1974	American Golf Classic	(United States) Gay Brewer, (United States) Jim Colbert (United States) Forrest Fezler	Colbert won with par on second extra hole Brewer and Fezler eliminated by par on first hole
5	1975	Andy Williams-San Diego Open Invitational	(United States) Bobby Nichols, (United States) J. C. Snead	Snead won with birdie on fourth extra hole Nichols eliminated by par on first hole
6	1976	World Open Golf Championship	(United States) Jerry McGee	Won with birdie on first extra hole
7	1980	Doral-Eastern Open	(United States) Jack Nicklaus	Won with birdie on second extra hole
8	1981	Wickes-Andy Williams San Diego Open	(United States) Tom Jenkins, (United States) Bruce Lietzke	Lietzke won with birdie on second extra hole Jenkins eliminated by par on first hole
9	1981	Tournament Players Championship	(United States) Barry Jaeckel, (United States) Curtis Strange	Won with par on first extra hole
10	1982	Georgia-Pacific Atlanta Golf Classic	(United States) Keith Fergus	Lost to birdie on first extra hole
11	1982	World Series of Golf	(United States) Craig Stadler	Lost to par on fourth extra hole
12	1985	Manufacturers Hanover Westchester Classic	(United States) George Burns, (United States) Roger Maltbie	Maltbie won with birdie on fourth extra hole
13	1986	Walt Disney World/Oldsmobile Classic	(United States) Lon Hinkle, (United States) Mike Sullivan	Won with par on first extra hole
14	1990	Masters Tournament	(England) Nick Faldo	Lost to par on second extra hole
15	1992	GTE Byron Nelson Classic	(United States) Billy Ray Brown, (United States) Ben Crenshaw (United States) Bruce Lietzke	Brown won with birdie on first extra hole

=== PGA of Japan Tour wins (1) ===
No.	Date	Tournament	Winning score	To par	Margin of victory	Runner-up
1	Sep 1, 1991	Daiwa KBC Augusta	66-69-69-69=273	−15	1 stroke	(Philippines) Frankie Miñoza

=== Latin American wins (2) ===
No.	Date	Tournament	Winning score	To par	Margin of victory	Runner(s)-up
1	Nov 26, 1978	Brazil Open	66-69-72-70=277	−7	5 strokes	(Argentina) Vicente Fernández, (Scotland) Steve Martin
2	Dec 16, 1979	Friendship Cup	71-69-66-69=275	−9	3 strokes	(United States) Peter Jacobsen

=== Other wins (12) ===
No.	Date	Tournament	Winning score	To par	Margin of victory	Runner(s)-up
1	Jun 28, 1981	Labatt's International Golf Classic	71-70-65-71=277	−11	6 strokes	(Canada) Daniel Talbot
1	Dec 5, 1982	Nedbank Million Dollar Challenge	72-69-68-71=280	−8	Playoff	(United States) Craig Stadler
2	Dec 15, 1985	Chrysler Team Championship (with (United States) Hal Sutton)	63-65-68-64=260	−28	Playoff	(United States) Charlie Bolling and (United States) Brad Fabel, (United States) Jim Colbert and (United States) Tom Purtzer, (United States) John Fought and (United States) Pat McGowan, (United States) Gary Hallberg and (United States) Scott Hoch
3	Nov 27, 1988	Skins Game	$290,000		$372,000	(United States) Jack Nicklaus
4	Nov 18, 1990	RMCC Invitational (with (United States) Fred Couples)	64-57-61=182	−34	5 strokes	(United States) Peter Jacobsen and (United States) Arnold Palmer
5	Nov 21, 1993	Franklin Funds Shark Shootout (with (Australia) Steve Elkington)	62-64-62=188	−28	1 stroke	(United States) Mark Calcavecchia and (United States) Brad Faxon, (United States) Hale Irwin and (United States) Bruce Lietzke, (United States) Tom Kite and (United States) Davis Love III, (United States) Mark O'Meara and (United States) Curtis Strange
6	Dec 3, 1995	Office Depot Father/Son Challenge (with son Raymond Floyd Jr.)	62-57=119	−25	6 strokes	(United States) Hale Irwin and son Steve Irwin
7	Dec 8, 1996	Office Depot Father/Son Challenge (2) (with son Raymond Floyd Jr.)	61-63=124	−20	2 strokes	(United States) Dave Stockton and son Ron Stockton
8	Dec 7, 1997	Office Depot Father/Son Challenge (3) (with son Raymond Floyd Jr.)	62-58=120	−24	1 stroke	(United States) Dave Stockton and son Ron Stockton
9	Jun 22, 2000	Tylenol Par-3 Shootout	$320,000		$200,000	(United States) Phil Mickelson
10	Dec 10, 2000	Office Depot Father/Son Challenge (4) (with son Robert Floyd)	62-60=122	−22	Playoff	(United States) Johnny Miller and son Scott Miller
11	Dec 2, 2001	Office Depot Father/Son Challenge (5) (with son Robert Floyd)	63-61=124	−20	1 stroke	(United States) Hale Irwin and son Steve Irwin

Other playoff record (3–2)

No.	Year	Tournament	Opponent(s)	Result
1	1982	Nedbank Million Dollar Challenge	(United States) Craig Stadler	Won with par on fourth extra hole
2	1985	Chrysler Team Championship (with (United States) Hal Sutton)	(United States) Charlie Bolling and (United States) Brad Fabel, (United States) Jim Colbert and (United States) Tom Purtzer, (United States) John Fought and (United States) Pat McGowan, (United States) Gary Hallberg and (United States) Scott Hoch	Won with birdie on first extra hole
3	1991	Fred Meyer Challenge (with (United States) Fred Couples)	(United States) Paul Azinger and (United States) Ben Crenshaw, (United States) Mark Calcavecchia and (United States) Bob Gilder	Azinger/Crenshaw won with birdie on second extra hole Calcavecchia/Gilder eliminated by par on first hole
4	1999	Office Depot Father/Son Challenge (with son Robert Floyd)	(United States) Jack Nicklaus and son Gary Nicklaus	Lost to birdie on third extra hole
5	2000	Office Depot Father/Son Challenge (with son Robert Floyd)	(United States) Johnny Miller and son Scott Miller	Won with birdie on first extra hole

=== Senior PGA Tour wins (14) ===
Legend
Senior PGA Tour major championships (4)
Tour Championships (2)
Other Senior PGA Tour (8)

No.	Date	Tournament	Winning score	To par	Margin of victory	Runner(s)-up
1	Sep 20, 1992	GTE North Classic	66-67-66=199	−17	2 strokes	(United States) Mike Hill
2	Oct 25, 1992	Ralphs Senior Classic	68-65-62=195	−21	3 strokes	(Japan) Isao Aoki
3	Dec 13, 1992	Senior Tour Championship	65-67-65=197	−19	5 strokes	(United States) George Archer, (United States) Dale Douglass
4	Mar 21, 1993	Gulfstream Aerospace Invitational	65-65-64=194	−22	5 strokes	(United States) George Archer
5	Aug 1, 1993	Northville Long Island Classic	73-70-65=208	−8	2 strokes	(United States) Bob Betley, (New Zealand) Bob Charles, (South Africa) Harold Henning, (United States) Bruce Lehnhard, (United States) Walt Zembriski
6	Apr 3, 1994	The Tradition	65-70-68-68=271	−17	Playoff	(United States) Dale Douglass
7	May 1, 1994	Las Vegas Senior Classic	68-70-65=203	−13	3 strokes	(United States) Tom Wargo
8	May 22, 1994	NFL Golf Classic	68-66-64=198	−10	1 stroke	(United States) Bob Murphy, (South Africa) Gary Player
9	Nov 13, 1994	Golf Magazine Senior Tour Championship (2)	67-73-67-66=273	−15	Playoff	(United States) Jim Albus
10	Apr 16, 1995	PGA Seniors' Championship	70-70-67-70=277	−11	5 strokes	(United States) John Paul Cain, (United States) Larry Gilbert, (United States) Lee Trevino
11	Aug 13, 1995	Burnet Senior Classic	68-65-68=201	−15	1 stroke	(Australia) Graham Marsh
12	Nov 5, 1995	Emerald Coast Classic	69-66=135 (Note: Shortened to 36 holes due to weather.)	−7	Playoff	(United States) Tom Wargo
13	Jul 14, 1996	Ford Senior Players Championship	71-66-65-73=275	−14	2 strokes	(United States) Hale Irwin
14	Jul 16, 2000	Ford Senior Players Championship (2)	71-67-69-66=273	−15	1 stroke	(United States) Larry Nelson, (United States) Dana Quigley

Senior PGA Tour playoff record (3–1)

No.	Year	Tournament	Opponent	Result
1	1994	The Tradition	(United States) Dale Douglass	Won with birdie on first extra hole
2	1994	Golf Magazine Senior Tour Championship	(United States) Jim Albus	Won with birdie on fifth extra hole
3	1995	Royal Caribbean Classic	(United States) J. C. Snead	Lost to par on first extra hole
4	1995	Emerald Coast Classic	(United States) Tom Wargo	Won with birdie on third extra hole

=== Other senior wins (12) ===
- 1992 Fuji Electric Grandslam
- 1994 Diners Club Matches (with Dave Eichelberger), Senior Skins Game
- 1995 Senior Skins Game, Senior Slam at Los Cabos, Lexus Challenge (with Michael Chiklis)
- 1996 Senior Skins Game, Senior Slam at Los Cabos
- 1997 Senior Skins Game, Lexus Challenge (with William Devane)
- 1998 Senior Skins Game
- 2006 Wendy's Champions Skins Game (with Dana Quigley)

== Major championships ==
=== Wins (4) ===
Year	Championship	54 holes	Winning score	Margin	Runner(s)-up
1969	PGA Championship	5 shot lead	−8 (69-66-67-74=276)	1 stroke	(South Africa) Gary Player
1976	Masters Tournament	8 shot lead	−17 (65-66-70-70=271)	8 strokes	(United States) Ben Crenshaw
1982	PGA Championship (2)	5 shot lead	−8 (63-69-68-72=272)	3 strokes	(United States) Lanny Wadkins
1986	U.S. Open	3 shot deficit	−1 (75-68-70-66=279)	2 strokes	(United States) Chip Beck, (United States) Lanny Wadkins

=== Results timeline ===
Tournament	1963	1964	1965	1966	1967	1968	1969
Masters Tournament			CUT	T8	CUT	T7	T36
U.S. Open		T14	T6	WD	T38		T13
The Open Championship							T34
PGA Championship	T57		T17	T18	T20	T41	1

Tournament	1970	1971	1972	1973	1974	1975	1976	1977	1978	1979
Masters Tournament	CUT	T13	CUT	54	T22	T30	1	T8	T16	T17
U.S. Open	T22	8	CUT	16	T15	T12	13	T47	T12	CUT
The Open Championship	CUT					T23	4	8	T2	T36
PGA Championship	T8	CUT	T4	T35	T11	T10	T2	T40	T50	T62

Tournament	1980	1981	1982	1983	1984	1985	1986	1987	1988	1989
Masters Tournament	T17	T8	T7	T4	T15	T2	CUT	CUT	T11	T38
U.S. Open	T47	T37	T49	T13	T52	T23	1	T43	T17	T26
The Open Championship		T3	T15	T14	CUT		T16	T17	CUT	T42
PGA Championship	T17	T19	1	T20	T13	CUT	CUT	T14	T9	T46

Tournament	1990	1991	1992	1993	1994	1995	1996	1997	1998	1999
Masters Tournament	2	T17	2	T11	T10	T17	T25	CUT	CUT	T38
U.S. Open	CUT	T8	T44	T7		T36				
The Open Championship	T39	CUT	T12	T34		T58				
PGA Championship	T49	T7	T48	CUT	T61					

Tournament	2000	2001	2002	2003	2004	2005	2006	2007	2008	2009
Masters Tournament	CUT	CUT	CUT	CUT	CUT	CUT	CUT	CUT	CUT	CUT
U.S. Open					CUT					
The Open Championship										
PGA Championship										

Win
Top 10
Did not play

CUT = missed the halfway cut (3rd round cut in 1984 Open Championship)
WD = withdrew
"T" indicates a tie for a place.

=== Summary ===
Tournament	Wins	2nd	3rd	Top-5	Top-10	Top-25	Events	Cuts made
Masters Tournament	1	3	0	5	11	22	45	27
U.S. Open	1	0	0	1	5	16	31	26
The Open Championship	0	1	1	3	4	10	20	16
PGA Championship	2	1	0	4	8	17	31	27
Totals	4	5	1	13	28	65	127	96

- Most consecutive cuts made – 24 (1972 PGA – 1979 Masters)
- Longest streak of top-10s – 3 (1976 Open Championship – 1977 Masters)

== The Players Championship ==
=== Wins (1) ===
Year	Championship	54 holes	Winning score	Margin	Runners-up
1981	Tournament Players Championship	6 shot deficit	−3 (72-74-71-68=285)	Playoff	(United States) Barry Jaeckel, (United States) Curtis Strange

=== Results timeline ===
Tournament	1974	1975	1976	1977	1978	1979	1980	1981	1982	1983	1984	1985	1986	1987	1988	1989	1990
The Players Championship	T24	T21	T12	T13	CUT	T14	CUT	1	T22	T23	T12	T33	T21	CUT	DQ	CUT	CUT

Win

CUT = missed the halfway cut
DQ = disqualified
"T" indicates a tie for a place.

== Champions Tour major championships ==
=== Wins (4) ===
Year	Championship	Winning score	Margin	Runner(s)-up
1994	The Tradition	−17 (65-70-68-68=271)	Playoff^{1}	(United States) Dale Douglass
1995	PGA Seniors' Championship	−11 (70-70-67-70=277)	5 strokes	(United States) John Paul Cain, (United States) Larry Gilbert, (United States) Lee Trevino
1996	Ford Senior Players Championship	−13 (71-66-65-73=275)	2 strokes	(United States) Hale Irwin
2000	Ford Senior Players Championship (2)	−15 (71-67-69-66=273)	1 stroke	(United States) Larry Nelson, (United States) Dana Quigley

^{1}Floyd birdied the first extra hole.

== U.S. national team appearances ==
Professional

- Ryder Cup: 1969 (winners), 1975 (winners), 1977 (winners), 1981 (winners), 1983 (winners), 1985, 1989 (non-playing captain), 1991 (winners), 1993 (winners)
- Dunhill Cup: 1985, 1986
- Nissan Cup: 1985 (winners)
- UBS Cup: 2001 (winners), 2002 (winners), 2003 (tie), 2004 (winners)
- Wendy's 3-Tour Challenge (representing Senior PGA Tour): 1992 (PGA Tour), 1993 (winners), 1994, 1995 (winners), 1996

== See also ==
- List of golfers with most Champions Tour major championship wins
- List of golfers with most Champions Tour wins
- List of golfers with most PGA Tour wins
- List of men's major championships winning golfers
