= Hyundai Team Matches =

Golf tournament formerly on the LPGA Tour

The Hyundai Team Matches were a series of golf tournaments from 1994 to 2002. The matches featured four two-player teams from the LPGA Tour, the PGA Tour, and the Senior PGA Tour (now the Champions Tour). Within each tour, the teams competed in a match play format. It was played at three locations in California. The event was known as the Diners Club Matches from 1994 to 1999.

== Tournament locations ==
- 1994–1997: PGA West Jack Nicklaus Resort Course, La Quinta, California
- 1999–2000: Pelican Hill, Newport Beach, California
- 2001–2002: Monarch Beach Golf Links, Dana Point, California

== Winners ==
Year	LPGA Tour	PGA Tour	Senior PGA Tour
Hyundai Team Matches
2002	Lorie Kane & Janice Moodie	Rich Beem & Peter Lonard	Allen Doyle & Dana Quigley
2001	Lorie Kane & Janice Moodie	Mark Calcavecchia & Fred Couples	Allen Doyle & Dana Quigley
2000	Juli Inkster & Dottie Pepper	Tom Lehman & Duffy Waldorf	Jack Nicklaus & Tom Watson
Diners Club Matches
1999	Juli Inkster & Dottie Pepper	Mark Calcavecchia & Fred Couples	Jack Nicklaus & Tom Watson
1998	No tournament		
1997	Juli Inkster & Dottie Pepper	Steve Elkington & Jeff Maggert	Gil Morgan & Jay Sigel
1996	Juli Inkster & Dottie Pepper	Tom Lehman & Duffy Waldorf	Jim Colbert & Bob Murphy
1995	Tammie Green & Kelly Robbins	Tom Lehman & Duffy Waldorf	Jim Colbert & Bob Murphy
1994	Tammie Green & Kelly Robbins	Jeff Maggert & Jim McGovern	Dave Eichelberger & Raymond Floyd
