= Wendy's Champions Skins Game =

Golf tournament in Hawaii

The Wendy's Champions Skins Game was an unofficial golf tournament on the Champions Tour. It was played annually in January/February in Maui, Hawaii at Kaanapali Golf Resort (Royal Kaanapali Golf Course). Wendy's was the main sponsor of the tournament. Before that, from 2001 through 2007, it was played at the Wailea Golf Club in Maui on their Gold Course.

The tournament was founded in 1988 as the Senior Skins Game. It was played in a skins game format where each hole, and the money or "skin" associated with it, was won by one player only if they win that hole outright. If no player won the hole, the "skin" carried over to the next hole. From 1988 to 2005, it was played as an individual event with four players (five in 1991). Beginning in 2006, it was played as an alternate-shot two-man team event with four teams.

The tournament was discontinued in December 2011. The purse for the final tournament in 2011 was US$770,000.

== Winners ==
Team event (2006–2011)

| Year | Winners | Runners-up |
Wendy's Champions Skins Game
| 2011 | (United States) Jack Nicklaus and (United States) Tom Watson | (Germany) Bernhard Langer and (United States) Mark O'Meara |
| 2010 | (United States) Jack Nicklaus and (United States) Tom Watson | (United States) Ben Crenshaw and (United States) Fuzzy Zoeller |
| 2009 | (United States) Ben Crenshaw and (United States) Fuzzy Zoeller | (Australia) Greg Norman and (United States) Jay Haas |
| 2008 | (United States) Peter Jacobsen and (United States) Fuzzy Zoeller | (United States) Jack Nicklaus and (United States) Tom Watson |
| 2007 | (United States) Jack Nicklaus and (United States) Tom Watson | (South Africa) Gary Player and (United States) Jay Haas |
| 2006 | (United States) Raymond Floyd and (United States) Dana Quigley | (United States) Jack Nicklaus and Tom Watson |

Individual event (1988–2005)

| Year | Winner | Country | Runner-up |
Wendy's Champions Skins Game
| 2005 | Jack Nicklaus | United States | (United States) Craig Stadler |
| 2004 | Tom Watson | United States | (United States) Arnold Palmer |
ConAgra Foods Champions Skins Game
| 2003 | Lee Trevino | United States | (United States) Hale Irwin |
Senior Skins Game
| 2002 | Hale Irwin | United States | (United States) Jack Nicklaus |
| 2001 | Hale Irwin | United States | (United States) Jack Nicklaus |
| 2000 | Gary Player | South Africa | (United States) Tom Watson |
| 1999 | Hale Irwin | United States | (United States) Raymond Floyd |
| 1998 | Raymond Floyd | United States | (United States) Hale Irwin |
| 1997 | Raymond Floyd | United States | (United States) Jack Nicklaus |
| 1996 | Raymond Floyd | United States | (United States) Jim Colbert |
| 1995 | Raymond Floyd | United States | (United States) Jack Nicklaus |
| 1994 | Raymond Floyd | United States | (United States) Arnold Palmer |
| 1993 | Arnold Palmer | United States | (Puerto Rico) Chi-Chi Rodríguez |
| 1992 | Arnold Palmer | United States | (Puerto Rico) Chi-Chi Rodríguez |
| 1991 | Jack Nicklaus | United States | (United States) Lee Trevino |
| 1990 | Arnold Palmer | United States | (United States) Jack Nicklaus |
| 1989 | Chi-Chi Rodríguez | Puerto Rico | (South Africa) Gary Player |
| 1988 | Chi-Chi Rodríguez | Puerto Rico | (South Africa) Gary Player |
