= Johnnie Walker Trophy =

Tournament information
- Location: Spain
- Established: 1980
- Month played: October/November
- Final year: 1984

Final champion
- (South Africa) Gary Player

The Johnnie Walker Trophy was an invitational men's professional golf tournament played from 1980 to 1984 in Spain. The 1980 and 1982 events were played at Real Club de Golf El Prat near Barcelona, the others being played at Golf La Moraleja near Madrid.

== Winners ==
| Year | Winner | Score | To par | Margin of victory | Runner-up | Ref |
|---|---|---|---|---|---|---|
| 1980 | (United States) Lee Trevino | 206 (Note: Played over 54 holes.) | −10 | 2 strokes | (Scotland) Sandy Lyle | |
| 1981 | (United States) Peter Jacobsen | 268 | −20 | 9 strokes | (Spain) Manuel Piñero | |
| 1982 | (United States) Peter Jacobsen (2) | 274 | −14 | 2 strokes | (Spain) Seve Ballesteros | |
| 1983 | (Germany) Bernhard Langer | 270 | −18 | 2 strokes | (Scotland) Sandy Lyle | |
| 1984 | (South Africa) Gary Player | 272 | −16 | Playoff (Note: Player won at the second playoff hole.) | (Spain) Seve Ballesteros | |
