= Fall 1978 PGA Tour Qualifying School graduates =

This is a list of the Fall 1978 PGA Tour Qualifying School graduates. There were 144 players in the field. Approximately 25 would earn playing privileges on the PGA Tour. The finals were from October 25-28 in Huntsville, Texas.

== Tournament summary ==
The Southeastern Regional was held at Sea Balms Golf Course in Saint Simons Island in Georgia. Among notable players in the field were Vance Heafner, Chip Beck, David Canipe, and David Eger. After the first round Beck of Fayetteville, North Carolina took the first round lead with a 65. Skip Dunaway of Charlotte, North Carolina was one shot behind.

Jim Thorpe was back at q-school after losing playing privileges on the PGA Tour. He earned co-medallist honors with John Fought.

== List of graduates ==
#	Player	Notes
T1	(United States) John Fought	Winner of 1977 U.S. Amateur
	(United States) Jim Thorpe	
3	(United States) Robert Donald	
	(United States) Roger Calvin	
T5	(United States) Scott Simpson	Winner of 1976 and 1977 NCAA Division I Championship
	(United States) David Edwards	Winner of 1978 NCAA Division I Championship
	(United States) Chip Beck	
8	(United States) Tommy Valentine	
	(United States) Mark Mike	
	(Canada) Dan Halldorson	4 Canadian Tour wins
	(United States) Tom McGinnis	
12	(United States) Lindy Miller	Low amateur at 1978 Masters Tournament
	(United States) Dick Mast	
	(United States) Jack Ferenz	
15	(United States) Don Shirey Jr.	
	(United States) Dana Quigley	
	(United States) Mike Brannan	
18	(United States) Tommy Thomas	
19	(United States) David Lundstrom	
	(United States) Tom Chaim	
21	(United States) Jack Sommers	
	(United States) Dennis Sullivan	
	(United States) Tony Hollifield	
24	(United States) Buddy Gardner	
	(United States) Larry Webb	
	(United States) Sam Trahan	
	(United States) Bobby Barker	
