= Bruce Fleisher =

American professional golfer (1948–2021)

Personal information
- Full name: Bruce Lee Fleisher
- Nationality: United States
- Born: October 16, 1948 Union City, Tennessee, U.S.
- Died: September 23, 2021 (aged 72) Palm Beach Gardens, Florida, U.S.
- Height: 6 ft 3 in (1.91 m)
- Weight: 205 lb (93 kg; 14.6 st)

Career
- Sport: Golf
- College: Miami-Dade Junior College; Furman University
- Turned professional: 1969
- Former tours: PGA Tour; Champions Tour
- Professional wins: 35

Number of wins by tour
- PGA Tour: 1
- PGA Tour Champions: 18
- European Senior Tour: 1
- Other: 15

Best results in major championships
- Masters Tournament: T25: 1992
- PGA Championship: T14: 1993
- U.S. Open: T41: 1986
- The Open Championship: CUT: 1969

Achievements and awards
- PGA Tour Comeback Player of the Year: 1991
- Senior PGA Tour money list winner: 1999
- Senior PGA Tour Player of the Year: 1999
- Senior PGA Tour Rookie of the Year: 1999
- Senior PGA Tour Byron Nelson Award: 1999

Bruce Lee Fleisher (October 16, 1948 – September 23, 2021) was an American professional golfer.

== Early life ==
Fleisher was born in Union City, Tennessee, and was Jewish.

In 1950, the Fleisher family moved to Wilmington, North Carolina, where Bruce began playing golf with his brothers, Leslie and Jerry. Fleisher became involved in golf at age seven by working as a caddie with his two brothers.

When Bruce was 14, the Fleishers moved to Miami, Florida.

== Amateur career ==
Fleisher attended Miami-Dade Junior College and Furman University. In 1968 at age 19, he became the third-youngest player to win the U.S. Amateur. He also was the low amateur at the 1969 Masters Tournament. He turned professional in 1969.

== Professional career ==
Fleisher won both individual and team gold medals in golf at the 1969 Maccabiah Games in Israel.

Fleisher spent much of his regular career as a club professional; he won the PGA Club Professional Championship in 1989. His regular tournament career was modest, with one win on the PGA Tour, the 1991 New England Classic, and a few wins in minor tournaments.

He was much more successful on the Champions Tour (now PGA Tour Champions) with 18 wins, including one senior major, the 2001 U.S. Senior Open. Fleisher became the first player ever to earn back-to-back victories in his first two Champions Tour events, which helped him win Player of the Year and Rookie of the Year awards in 1999. He also has one win on the European Seniors Tour, which came in 2000 at the Irish Seniors Open.

He served as head coach for the USA Open Golf Team at the 1989 Maccabiah Games and the 2013 Maccabiah Games in Israel.

== Personal life ==
Fleisher and his wife Wendy lived in the Palm Beach Gardens, Florida, area. In 2017, he was inducted into the Greater Wilmington (North Carolina) Sports Hall of Fame.

Fleisher died of cancer at age 72 on September 23, 2021.

== Amateur wins ==
- 1968 U.S. Amateur

== Professional wins (35) ==
=== PGA Tour wins (1) ===
No.	Date	Tournament	Winning score	Margin of victory	Runner-up
1	Jul 14, 1991	New England Classic	−16 (64-67-73-64=268)	Playoff	(Australia) Ian Baker-Finch

PGA Tour playoff record (1–0)

No.	Year	Tournament	Opponent	Result
1	1991	New England Classic	(Australia) Ian Baker-Finch	Won with birdie on seventh extra hole

=== Latin American and Caribbean wins (6) ===
- 1971 Brazil Open
- 1980 Panama Open
- 1986 Jamaica Open
- 1990 Jamaica Open, Bahamas Open, Chevrolet Classic

=== Other wins (9) ===
- 1977 Little Crosby Pro-Am
- 1980 Florida Open
- 1981 South Florida PGA Championship
- 1987 Florida Open, South Florida PGA Championship
- 1989 PGA Club Professional Championship
- 1993 Pebble Beach Invitational
- 2015 Bass Pro Shops Legends of Golf (Legends division, with Larry Nelson)
- 2016 Bass Pro Shops Legends of Golf (Legends division, with Larry Nelson)

=== Champions Tour wins (18) ===
Legend
Senior major championships (1)
Other Champions Tour (17)

No.	Date	Tournament	Winning score	Margin of victory	Runner(s)-up
1	Feb 7, 1999	Royal Caribbean Classic	−11 (66-69-70=205)	2 strokes	(Japan) Isao Aoki
2	Feb 14, 1999	American Express Invitational	−13 (67-67-69=203)	3 strokes	(United States) Larry Nelson
3	Apr 25, 1999	Home Depot Invitational	−11 (69-67-69=205)	1 stroke	(United States) Terry Dill, (United States) Jim Holtgrieve
4	Jun 13, 1999	BellSouth Senior Classic	−16 (71-63-66=200)	1 stroke	(United States) Al Geiberger
5	Aug 8, 1999	Lightpath Long Island Classic	−10 (64-69-73=206)	2 strokes	(United States) Allen Doyle
6	Oct 10, 1999	The Transamerica	−17 (66-66-67=199)	1 stroke	(United States) Allen Doyle
7	Oct 24, 1999	EMC Kaanapali Classic	−17 (65-67-67=199)	1 stroke	(United States) Allen Doyle
8	Feb 6, 2000	Royal Caribbean Classic (2)	30 pts (6-16-8=30)	2 points	(Argentina) Vicente Fernández
9	Feb 20, 2000	GTE Classic	−16 (67-64-69=200)	4 strokes	(United States) Dana Quigley
10	May 7, 2000	Home Depot Invitational (2)	−13 (67-68-68=203)	Playoff	(United States) Hubert Green
11	Jul 30, 2000	Lightpath Long Island Classic (2)	−18 (63-66-69=198)	2 strokes	(United States) Dana Quigley
12	Apr 22, 2001	Las Vegas Senior Classic	−8 (70-68-70=208)	3 strokes	(Spain) José María Cañizares, (Argentina) Vicente Fernández, (United States) Walter Hall, (United States) Hale Irwin, (United States) Doug Tewell, (United States) Larry Nelson
13	May 6, 2001	Home Depot Invitational (3)	−15 (66-67-68=201)	3 strokes	(South Africa) John Bland
14	Jul 1, 2001	U.S. Senior Open	E (69-71-72-68=280)	1 stroke	(Japan) Isao Aoki, (United States) Gil Morgan
15	Feb 24, 2002	RJR Championship	−8 (75-66-67=208)	1 stroke	(United States) Hale Irwin, (United States) Gary McCord
16	Feb 23, 2003	Verizon Classic (2)	−8 (68-70-67=205)	1 stroke	(United States) Hale Irwin
17	Feb 8, 2004	Royal Caribbean Golf Classic (3)	−6 (69-70-71=210)	1 stroke	(United States) Dana Quigley
18	May 2, 2004	Bruno's Memorial Classic	−16 (64-68-68=200)	7 strokes	(United States) Bruce Lietzke, (United States) D. A. Weibring

Champions Tour playoff record (1–2)

No.	Year	Tournament	Opponent(s)	Result
1	1999	Southwestern Bell Dominion	(Spain) José María Cañizares, (United States) John Mahaffey	Mahaffey won with birdie on second extra hole Fleisher eliminated by birdie on first hole
2	2000	Home Depot Invitational	(United States) Hubert Green	Won with birdie on third extra hole
3	2001	State Farm Senior Classic	(United States) Allen Doyle	Lost to par on third extra hole

=== European Seniors Tour wins (1) ===
No.	Date	Tournament	Winning score	Margin of victory	Runners-up
1	May 14, 2000	AIB Irish Seniors Open	−7 (70-67-72=209)	3 strokes	(United States) George Burns, (Australia) Bob Shearer

== Playoff record ==
Ben Hogan Tour playoff record (0–1)

No.	Year	Tournament	Opponents	Result
1	1990	Ben Hogan Gateway Open	(United States) John Daly, (United States) Ted Tryba	Tryba won with eagle on first extra hole

== Results in major championships ==
Tournament	1968	1969
Masters Tournament		44LA
U.S. Open	CUT	CUT
The Open Championship		CUT
PGA Championship		

Tournament	1970	1971	1972	1973	1974	1975	1976	1977	1978	1979
Masters Tournament										
U.S. Open		CUT					CUT	T44		
The Open Championship										
PGA Championship										

Tournament	1980	1981	1982	1983	1984	1985	1986	1987	1988	1989
Masters Tournament										
U.S. Open							T41			
The Open Championship										
PGA Championship		T43		T63						

Tournament	1990	1991	1992	1993	1994
Masters Tournament			T25		
U.S. Open					
The Open Championship					
PGA Championship	CUT	CUT	T33	T14	T61

Did not play

LA = Low amateur
CUT = missed the half-way cut (3rd round cut in 1969 Open Championship)
"T" indicates a tie for a place

== Champions Tour major championships ==
=== Wins (1) ===
Year	Championship	Winning score	Margin	Runners-up
2001	U.S. Senior Open	E (69-71-72-68=280)	1 stroke	(Japan) Isao Aoki, (United States) Gil Morgan

== Maccabiah Games ==
Fleisher won a gold medal at the 1969 Maccabiah Games in Israel, and he coached the U.S. golf team at the 1989 Games.

== U.S. national team appearances ==
Amateur

- Eisenhower Trophy: 1968 (winners)
- Walker Cup: 1969 (winners)

Professional

- PGA Cup: 1990 (winners)

== See also ==
- 1971 PGA Tour Qualifying School graduates
- 1994 PGA Tour Qualifying School graduates
- 1997 PGA Tour Qualifying School graduates
- List of golfers with most PGA Tour Champions wins
- List of Jewish golfers
