= Bob Gilder =

American professional golfer (born 1950)

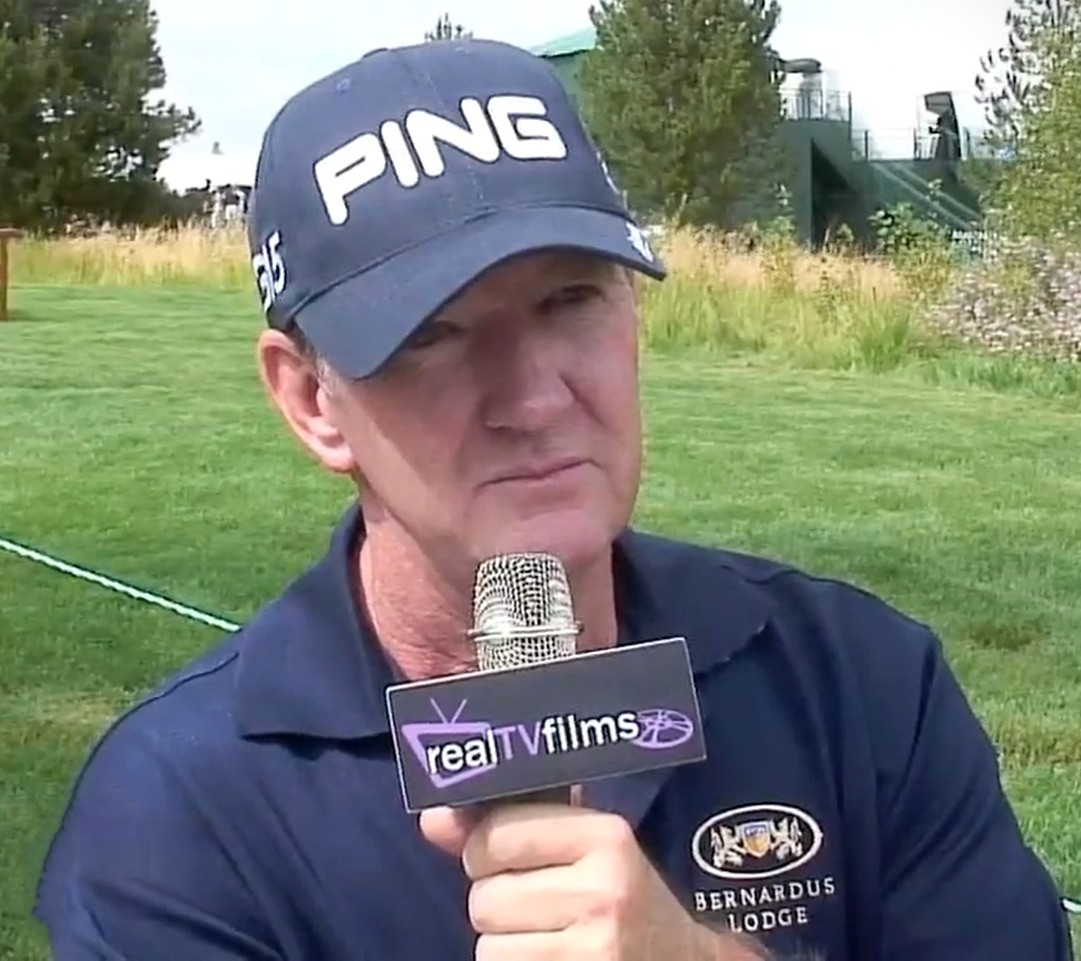
- Gilder in 2010

Personal information
- Full name: Robert Bryan Gilder
- Nationality: United States
- Born: December 31, 1950 (age 75) Corvallis, Oregon, U.S.
- Height: 5 ft 9 in (1.75 m)
- Spouse: Peggy Gilder

Career
- Sport: Golf
- College: Arizona State University
- Turned professional: 1973
- Current tour: Champions Tour
- Former tour: PGA Tour
- Professional wins: 24
- Highest ranking: 94 (August 11, 1991)

Number of wins by tour
- PGA Tour: 6
- Japan Golf Tour: 3
- PGA Tour of Australasia: 1
- PGA Tour Champions: 10
- Other: 4

Best results in major championships
- Masters Tournament: 14th: 1982
- PGA Championship: T4: 1981
- U.S. Open: T6: 1992
- The Open Championship: T39: 1983

Achievements and awards
- Senior PGA Tour Rookie of the Year: 2001

Robert Bryan Gilder (born December 31, 1950) is an American professional golfer. He won six tournaments on the PGA Tour and currently plays on the Champions Tour, where he has ten wins since joining in 2001.

== Early life and amateur career ==
Born in Corvallis, Oregon, Gilder graduated from Corvallis High School. He then attended Arizona State University in Tempe, Arizona. He walked on to the Sun Devils' golf team and was the 1973 Western Athletic Conference individual golf champion.

== Professional career ==
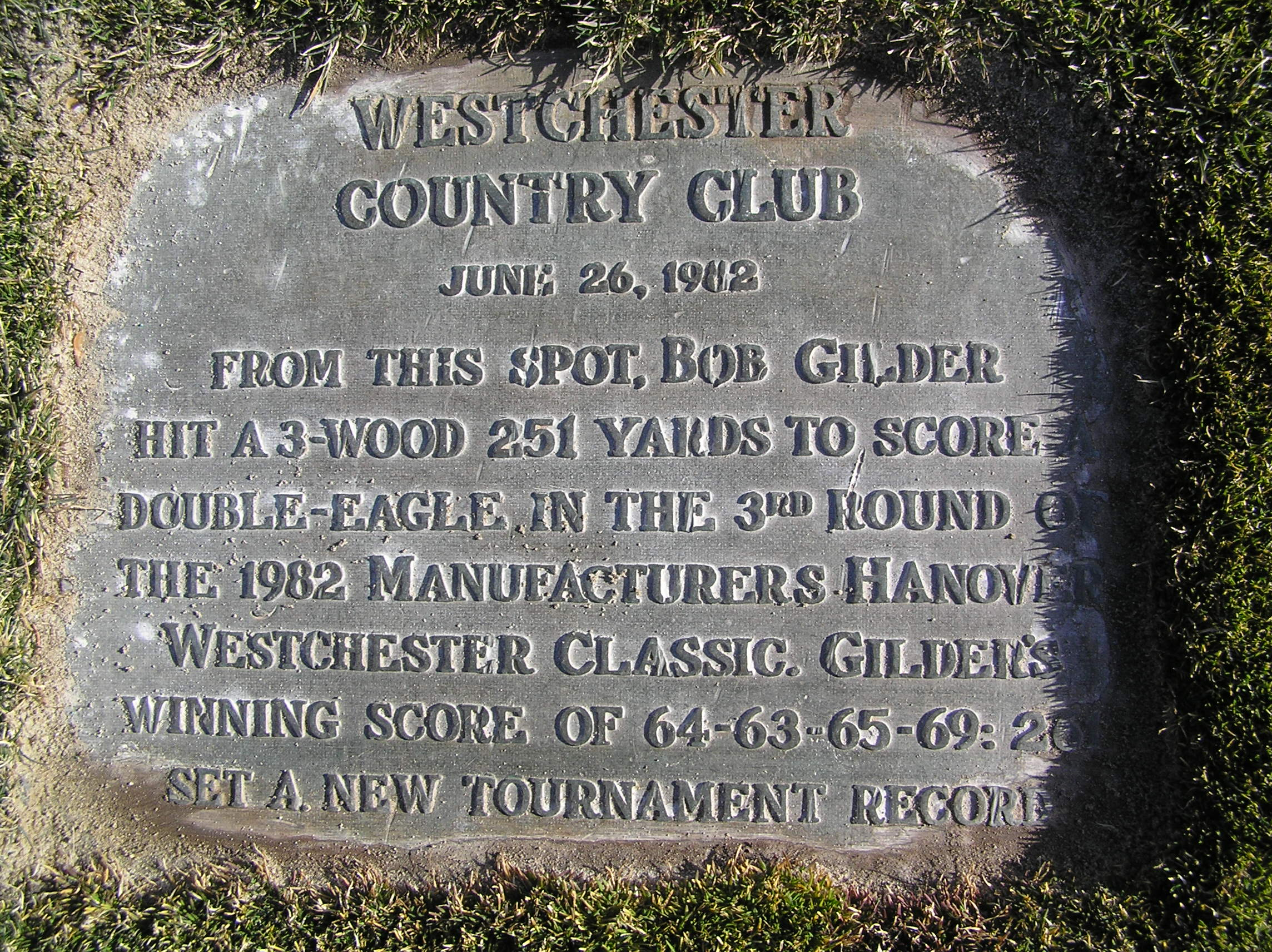
Gilder's double-eagle plaque at Westchester Country Club

In 1973, Gilder turned pro and found success soon thereafter. He won a tournament on the New Zealand Golf Circuit in 1974, the New Zealand Open. He shot 283 (−5) and then defeated Jack Newton and Bob Charles in a playoff. He won his first PGA Tour tournament a year and a half later at the 1976 Phoenix Open. He won six times during his career, including three in 1982. Gilder was a tour mainstay for many years and played on the Ryder Cup team in 1983.

Gilder may be best remembered for his double eagle in 1982 at the Manufacturers Hanover Westchester Classic. It took place during the third round, at the 509-yard (465 m) par-5 18th hole of the Westchester Country Club, just north of New York City. Gilder used a 3 wood from 251 yards (230 m) away; his second shot carried 230 yards (210 m), landed softly on the green, and rolled into the cup. A plaque on the 18th fairway commemorates the feat. It gave him a 192 (−18) for 54 holes, which tied a tour record. It also doubled his lead to a comfortable six strokes; he won the tournament by five strokes on Sunday with a 69 to finish at 261 (−19).

Gilder won one of the longest sudden death playoffs in PGA Tour history at the Phoenix Open in January 1983. It took him eight holes to defeat Rex Caldwell, Johnny Miller, and Mark O'Meara. It was his second win in Phoenix and sixth and final victory on the PGA Tour.

=== Senior career ===
At the end of 2000, Gilder became eligible to play on the Senior PGA Tour and found immediate success, winning two tournaments and being named Rookie of the Year in 2001.

After winning tournaments in five out of his first six years on the Champions Tour, Gilder entered a victory drought of almost five years. In the first seven individual events of the 2011 season, he placed no higher than a tie for 56th place, and had struggled to a stroke average of over 73.5 per round. However, Gilder ended his drought with a come-from-behind win in the Principal Charity Classic, a tournament he had previously won in 2002. With three birdies on his final four holes, including a birdie on the notoriously difficult 18th hole, Gilder was the victor by one shot over Champions Tour rookie Mark Brooks, who was seeking his first win on the senior circuit. This victory gave Gilder his milestone 10th victory on the Champions Tour.

== Personal life ==
Gilder is a lifelong resident of Corvallis, Oregon. He enjoys auto racing and has competed in Trans-Am races.

Gilder and his wife, Peggy, have a grandson with cystic fibrosis and are involved with several charities that help battle the disease including Doernbecher Children's Hospital and the Cystic Fibrosis Foundation.

== Awards and honors ==
- In 2001, Gilder earned Rookie of the Year honors on the Senior PGA Tour.
- In 2002, Gilder was inducted into the Oregon Sports Hall of Fame.

== Amateur wins ==
- 1973 Western Athletic Conference Championship (individual)

== Professional wins (24) ==
=== PGA Tour wins (6) ===
No.	Date	Tournament	Winning score	Margin of victory	Runner(s)-up
1	Jan 18, 1976	Phoenix Open	−16 (68-67-66-67=268)	2 strokes	(United States) Roger Maltbie
2	Jun 22, 1980	Canadian Open	−6 (67-67-70-70=274)	2 strokes	(United States) Jerry Pate, (United States) Leonard Thompson
3	May 2, 1982	Byron Nelson Golf Classic	−14 (67-65-67-67=266)	5 strokes	(United States) Curtis Strange
4	Jun 27, 1982	Manufacturers Hanover Westchester Classic	−19 (64-63-65-69=261)	5 strokes	(United States) Peter Jacobsen, (United States) Tom Kite
5	Sep 12, 1982	Bank of Boston Classic	−13 (67-67-70-67=271)	2 strokes	(United States) Fuzzy Zoeller
6	Jan 30, 1983	Phoenix Open (2)	−13 (68-68-66-69=271)	Playoff	(United States) Rex Caldwell, (United States) Johnny Miller, (United States) Mark O'Meara

PGA Tour playoff record (1–0)

No.	Year	Tournament	Opponents	Result
1	1983	Phoenix Open	(United States) Rex Caldwell, (United States) Johnny Miller, (United States) Mark O'Meara	Won with birdie on eighth extra hole Miller and O'Meara eliminated by birdie on second hole

=== PGA of Japan Tour wins (3) ===
No.	Date	Tournament	Winning score	Margin of victory	Runner-up
1	Oct 26, 1980	Bridgestone Tournament	−5 (71-70-72-70=283)	1 stroke	(Japan) Isao Aoki
2	Nov 7, 1982	Goldwin Cup Japan vs USA	−10 (65-69=134)	Shared title with (United States) Calvin Peete	
3	Nov 4, 1990	Acom P.T.	115 pts (38-39-38=115) (Note: Shortened to 54 holes due to weather.)	1 point	(United States) Bob Tway

=== New Zealand Golf Circuit wins (1) ===
No.	Date	Tournament	Winning score	Margin of victory	Runners-up
1	Nov 24, 1974	New Zealand Open	−5 (74-69-68-72=283)	Playoff	(New Zealand) Bob Charles, (Australia) Jack Newton

New Zealand Golf Circuit playoff record (1–0)

No.	Year	Tournament	Opponents	Result
1	1974	New Zealand Open	(New Zealand) Bob Charles, (Australia) Jack Newton	Won with birdie on third extra hole Newton eliminated by par on second hole

=== Other wins (4) ===
- 1987 Northwest Open
- 1988 Isuzu Kapalua International, Acom Team Championship (with Doug Tewell) (Japan)
- 1989 Spalding Invitational

=== Champions Tour wins (10) ===
Legend
Tour Championships (1)
Other Champions Tour (9)

No.	Date	Tournament	Winning score	Margin of victory	Runner(s)-up
1	Feb 18, 2001	Verizon Classic	−11 (70-68-67=205)	3 strokes	(United States) Bruce Fleisher, (United States) Raymond Floyd, (United States) Gil Morgan
2	Oct 28, 2001	Senior Tour Championship	−11 (67-68-69-73=277)	1 stroke	(United States) Doug Tewell
3	Jul 21, 2002	SBC Senior Open	−12 (70-63-71=204)	Playoff	(United States) Hale Irwin
4	Jul 28, 2002	FleetBoston Classic	−13 (66-67-70=203)	Playoff	(United States) John Mahaffey
5	Sep 1, 2002	Allianz Championship	−13 (67-66-67=203)	1 stroke	(South Africa) John Bland
6	Sep 8, 2002	Kroger Senior Classic	−16 (66-65-69=200)	Playoff	(United States) Tom Jenkins
7	Apr 20, 2003	Emerald Coast Classic	−17 (66-64-63=193)	4 strokes	(Argentina) Vicente Fernández, (United States) Larry Nelson, (United States) Leonard Thompson
8	Sep 18, 2005	Constellation Energy Classic	−18 (64-67-67=198)	4 strokes	(United States) Morris Hatalsky
9	Sep 17, 2006	Constellation Energy Classic (2)	−14 (69-68-65=202)	2 strokes	(United States) Brad Bryant, (United States) Jay Haas
10	Jun 5, 2011	Principal Charity Classic (2)	−14 (68-66-65=199)	1 stroke	(United States) Mark Brooks

Champions Tour playoff record (3–0)

No.	Year	Tournament	Opponent	Result
1	2002	SBC Senior Open	(United States) Hale Irwin	Won with par on first extra hole
2	2002	FleetBoston Classic	(United States) John Mahaffey	Won with birdie on third extra hole
3	2002	Kroger Senior Classic	(United States) Tom Jenkins	Won with birdie on second extra hole

== Results in major championships ==
Tournament	1973	1974	1975	1976	1977	1978	1979
Masters Tournament				T39			
U.S. Open	CUT		T49	T58	CUT	T44	T16
The Open Championship			T40				
PGA Championship				T69	T58	T19	T16

Tournament	1980	1981	1982	1983	1984	1985	1986	1987	1988	1989
Masters Tournament	CUT	T15	14	T44	CUT	T44				37
U.S. Open	T32	CUT	T37	T39	CUT		CUT	T58	T8	CUT
The Open Championship	T51			T39	CUT					
PGA Championship	T55	T4	8	T63	T37	T18	T53		T6	T34

Tournament	1990	1991	1992	1993	1994	1995	1996	1997	1998	1999
Masters Tournament			T42	T34						
U.S. Open	T56		T6	T33			T50	CUT		CUT
The Open Championship										
PGA Championship	T57	T5	CUT							

Top 10
Did not play

CUT = missed the half-way cut
"T" = tied

=== Summary ===
Tournament	Wins	2nd	3rd	Top-5	Top-10	Top-25	Events	Cuts made
Masters Tournament	0	0	0	0	0	2	10	8
U.S. Open	0	0	0	0	2	3	21	13
The Open Championship	0	0	0	0	0	0	4	3
PGA Championship	0	0	0	2	4	7	16	15
Totals	0	0	0	2	6	12	51	39

- Most consecutive cuts made – 8 (1981 PGA – 1983 PGA)
- Longest streak of top-10s – 2 (1988 U.S. Open – 1988 PGA)

== Results in The Players Championship ==
Tournament	1976	1977	1978	1979	1980	1981	1982	1983	1984	1985	1986	1987	1988	1989	1990	1991	1992	1993	1994	1995
The Players Championship	T51	T61	CUT	T43	CUT	T63	T65	T35	CUT	T33	CUT	T32	CUT	T34	T56	CUT	CUT	CUT	T35	T43

CUT = missed the halfway cut
"T" indicates a tie for a place

== U.S. national team appearances ==
Professional

- Ryder Cup: 1983 (winners)
- World Cup: 1982
- UBS Warburg Cup: 2002 (winners)

== See also ==
- Fall 1975 PGA Tour Qualifying School graduates
- 1997 PGA Tour Qualifying School graduates
- List of golfers with most PGA Tour Champions wins
