= Mike Reid (golfer) =

American professional golfer (born 1954)

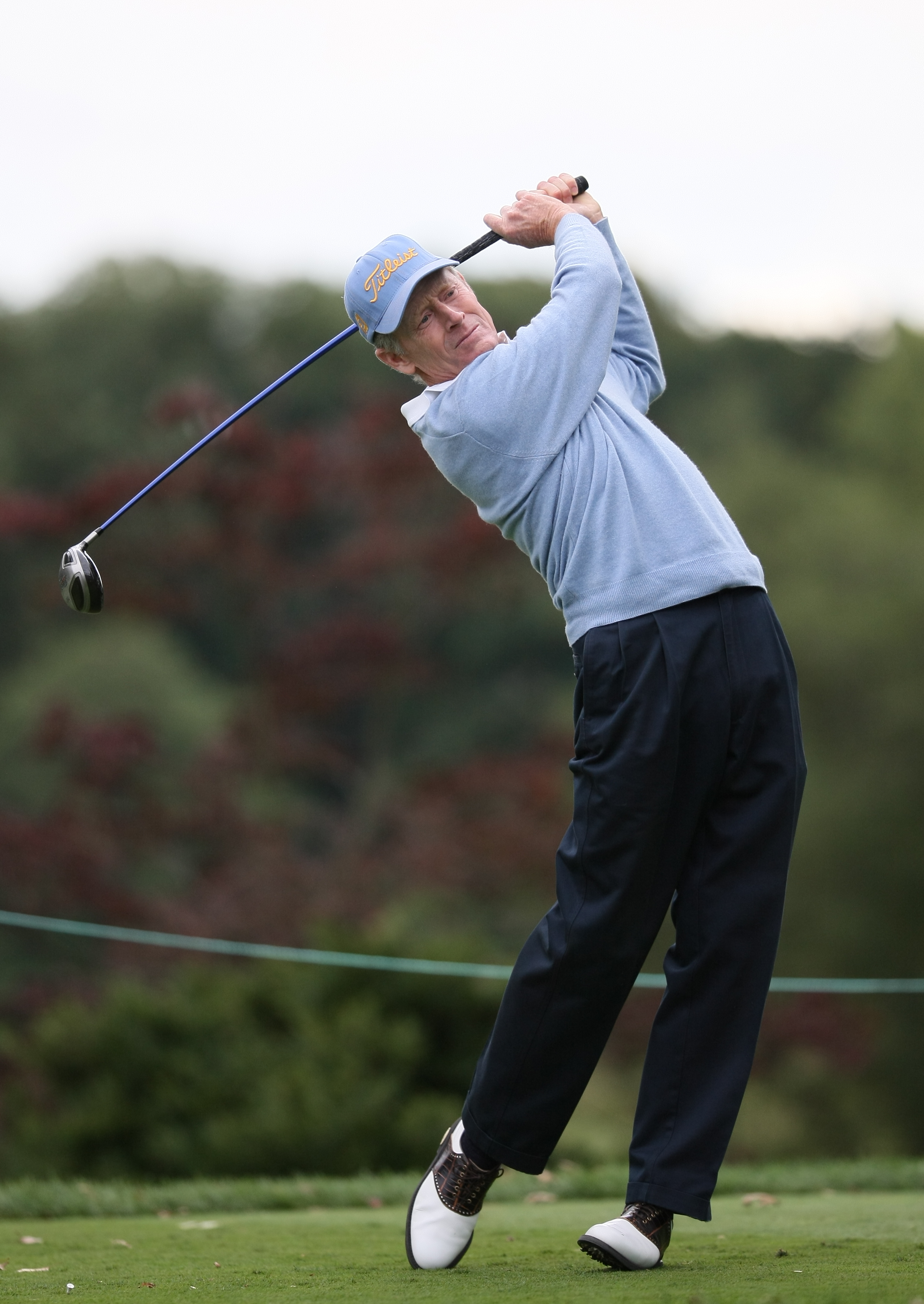

Personal information
- Full name: Michael Daniel Reid II
- Nationality: United States
- Born: July 1, 1954 (age 72) Bainbridge, Maryland, U.S.
- Height: 5 ft 11 in (1.80 m)
- Weight: 165 lb (75 kg; 11.8 st)
- Spouse: Randolyn Brockbank Reid
- Children: 6

Career
- Sport: Golf
- College: Brigham Young University
- Turned professional: 1976
- Current tour: PGA Tour Champions
- Former tour: PGA Tour
- Professional wins: 8
- Highest ranking: 19 (August 20, 1989)

Number of wins by tour
- PGA Tour: 2
- Japan Golf Tour: 1
- PGA Tour Champions: 2
- Other: 3

Best results in major championships
- Masters Tournament: 6th: 1989
- PGA Championship: T2: 1989
- U.S. Open: T6: 1980
- The Open Championship: T26: 1991

Michael Daniel Reid (born July 1, 1954) is an American professional golfer. Reid was one of the top amateurs in the mid-1970s, winning the 1976 Pacific Coast Amateur and leading the 1976 U.S. Open after the first round. As a professional, Reid won two PGA Tour events and finished in the top-10 70 times. In 1989, Reid came close to winning two major championships, the Masters and the PGA Championship, leading both of them during closing holes of the final round. On the Champions Tour, Reid won two senior majors, the 2005 Senior PGA Championship and the 2009 Tradition.

== Early life ==
Reid was born in Bainbridge, Maryland, the son of an Air Force officer. He first hit a golf ball when he was five years old. Military life for his father meant that his family frequently moved from one state in America to another. Reid later said: "It wasn't much of a life for a kid growing up but it certainly helped my golf game as I played on every kind of grass there is."

== Amateur career ==
In 1976, Reid graduated from Brigham Young University. During his collegiate golf career, Reid was selected for All-American honors from 1973 to 1976. He became close friends with PGA Tour player Pat McGowan. Both Reid and McGowan developed their game under BYU's golf coach Karl Tucker.

At the 1976 U.S. Open, while still an amateur, Reid led the tournament by three strokes with an opening round of 67, before finishing tied for 50th place. Reid won the 1976 Pacific Coast Amateur at Los Angeles Country Club and lost in the quarterfinals of the 1976 U.S. Amateur. At the end of 1976 Reid was ranked the #7 amateur in the country by Golf Digest.

== Professional career ==
Reid turned professional in late 1976, obtaining his PGA Tour card at the first attempt. He joined the PGA Tour in 1977.

In 1978, Reid lost a playoff to Mac McLendon in the Pensacola Open. In 1980, Reid finished in the top-10 thirteen times on the PGA Tour. Only Tom Watson had more top-10 finishes that year. Reid led the PGA Tour for driving accuracy in 1980 and was given the nickname "Radar" for his outstanding driving accuracy.

In 1985, Reid lost a playoff to Hal Sutton in the Southwest Golf Classic. Sutton sank a 30-foot birdie putt on the first extra hole to win the tournament.

Reid ended a wait of over a decade for his first PGA Tour title by winning the 1987 Seiko Tucson Open by four strokes.

In 1988, Reid finished 2nd at The Players Championship. Later in 1988, Reid won his second PGA Tour title by defeating Tom Watson in a playoff at the NEC World Series of Golf.

In 1989, Reid led the Masters Tournament with four holes to play but hit an approach shot into the pond at the par-5 15th hole to make a double-bogey and finished the tournament in 6th place. He also lost the lead in that year's PGA Championship on the back nine during the final round at Kemper Lakes Golf Club, bogeying the 16th hole and having a double-bogey 5 on the par-3 17th. Needing a birdie on the 18th hole to tie Payne Stewart, Reid missed a seven-foot birdie putt which would have forced a playoff with Stewart. After his final round, Jack Nicklaus approached Reid and said: "I just want to say that I've never felt so bad for anyone in my life. You played too well not to win."

In 1990, Reid was the third round leader in the KMart Greater Greensboro Open, but had three bogeys on the back nine for a round of 75, finishing in a tie for 2nd place behind the winner Steve Elkington. Later in the year, in November 1990, Reid won the Casio World Open in Japan by two strokes.

Reid missed virtually all of the 1993 PGA Tour season after sustaining a wrist injury while playing table tennis, which resulted in him having surgery to reattach a tendon.

In 1997, Reid was the third round leader in the Hawaiian Open, but lost the tournament in a three-way playoff to Paul Stankowski. In 1998, Reid shot a course record of 62 in the Westin Texas Open at La Cantera Golf Club. He finished the tournament tied for 4th place.

Reid's last top-5 finish on the PGA Tour was 5th place at the Michelob Championship at Kingsmill in 2000, at the age of 46.

=== Senior career ===
In 2004, Reid became eligible to play the Champions Tour and in 2005 he claimed his first senior title at the Senior PGA Championship, which is one of the senior majors. Reid won the tournament despite being three shots down with one hole to play. He forced himself into a three-way playoff with a long eagle putt on the 18th hole. After Jerry Pate missed a 3-foot par putt on the 18th to win the tournament, Reid then birdied the first extra playoff hole to win the title. Reid later said: "I feel bad for Jerry. I know how he feels because I felt that way. Fate takes a hand, and I can't explain it, but I'm grateful."

Reid did not win again on the Champions Tour until 2009 at the JELD-WEN Tradition, another major championship, in a playoff over John Cook. Reid was one shot behind Cook on the 18th tee of the final round. Reid and Cook both hit their approach shots to the par-4 18th into the right greenside bunker. Cook's bunker shot finished 20 feet away and Reid's bunker shot finished six inches from the hole. Cook missed his par putt that would have won the championship. On the first playoff hole Reid holed a 12-foot birdie putt to win the title.

== Personal life ==
He is married to wife Randolyn and has six children. He spends his free time visiting historic sites and museums. Reid is a member of The Church of Jesus Christ of Latter-day Saints and after retirement served as a full-time missionary in Southern California with his wife.

== Amateur wins ==
- 1976 Western Athletic Conference Championship (individual), Pacific Coast Amateur

== Professional wins (8) ==
=== PGA Tour wins (2) ===
No.	Date	Tournament	Winning score	Margin of victory	Runner(s)-up
1	Oct 25, 1987	Seiko Tucson Open	−20 (64-69-68-67=268)	4 strokes	(United States) Chip Beck, (United States) Mark Calcavecchia, (United States) Hal Sutton, (United States) Fuzzy Zoeller
2	Aug 28, 1988	NEC World Series of Golf	−5 (70-65-71-69=275)	Playoff	(United States) Tom Watson

PGA Tour playoff record (1–3)

No.	Year	Tournament	Opponent(s)	Result
1	1978	Pensacola Open	(United States) Mac McLendon	Lost to par on first extra hole
2	1985	Southwest Golf Classic	(United States) Hal Sutton	Lost to birdie on first extra hole
3	1988	NEC World Series of Golf	(United States) Tom Watson	Won with par on first extra hole
4	1997	United Airlines Hawaiian Open	(United States) Jim Furyk, (United States) Paul Stankowski	Stankowski won with birdie on fourth extra hole Reid eliminated by par on first hole

=== PGA of Japan Tour wins (1) ===
No.	Date	Tournament	Winning score	Margin of victory	Runner-up
1	Nov 25, 1990	Casio World Open	−14 (69-70-65-70=274)	2 strokes	(Japan) Yoshinori Kaneko

=== Other wins (3) ===
- 1983 Shootout at Jeremy Ranch (with Bob Goalby), Utah Open
- 1985 Utah Open

=== Champions Tour wins (2) ===
Legend
Champions Tour major championships (2)
Other Champions Tour (0)

No.	Date	Tournament	Winning score	Margin of victory	Runner(s)-up
1	Aug 28, 2005	Senior PGA Championship	−8 (70-70-70-70=280)	Playoff	(United States) Jerry Pate, (United States) Dana Quigley
2	Aug 23, 2009	JELD-WEN Tradition	−16 (70-67-66-69=272)	Playoff	(United States) John Cook

Champions Tour playoff record (2–0)

No.	Year	Tournament	Opponent(s)	Result
1	2005	Senior PGA Championship	(United States) Jerry Pate, (United States) Dana Quigley	Won with birdie on first extra hole
2	2009	JELD-WEN Tradition	(United States) John Cook	Won with birdie on first extra hole

== Results in major championships ==
Tournament	1975	1976	1977	1978	1979
Masters Tournament					
U.S. Open	CUT	T50 LA	CUT		T25
The Open Championship					
PGA Championship					CUT

Tournament	1980	1981	1982	1983	1984	1985	1986	1987	1988	1989
Masters Tournament		CUT							CUT	6
U.S. Open	T6	T20	CUT	T43	T52	T23	T24	CUT	CUT	CUT
The Open Championship									CUT	T61
PGA Championship	T55		T42	T9	T14	T70	T41	T47	64	T2

Tournament	1990	1991	1992	1993	1994	1995	1996	1997	1998	1999
Masters Tournament	CUT									
U.S. Open	T33	T26	CUT					CUT	T49	
The Open Championship	T39	T26								
PGA Championship	T45						CUT			T65

Tournament	2000	2001	2002	2003	2004	2005
Masters Tournament						
U.S. Open						
The Open Championship						
PGA Championship						CUT

Top 10
Did not play

LA = low amateur
CUT = missed the halfway cut
"T" indicates a tie for a place.

=== Summary ===
Tournament	Wins	2nd	3rd	Top-5	Top-10	Top-25	Events	Cuts made
Masters Tournament	0	0	0	0	1	1	4	1
U.S. Open	0	0	0	0	1	5	19	11
The Open Championship	0	0	0	0	0	0	4	3
PGA Championship	0	1	0	1	2	3	14	11
Totals	0	1	0	1	4	9	41	26

- Most consecutive cuts made – 9 (1982 PGA – 1986 PGA)
- Longest streak of top-10s – 1 (four times)

== Results in The Players Championship ==
Tournament	1977	1978	1979	1980	1981	1982	1983	1984	1985	1986	1987	1988	1989	1990	1991	1992	1993	1994	1995	1996	1997	1998	1999	2000
The Players Championship	T71	T57	T35	T5	CUT	T27	CUT	CUT	T40	CUT	T15	2	T29	T46		CUT	T67	CUT	CUT	T65	T62	CUT	CUT	CUT

Top 10
Did not play

CUT = missed the halfway cut
"T" indicates a tie for a place

== Senior major championships ==
=== Wins (2) ===
Year	Championship	Winning score	Margin	Runner(s)-up
2005	Senior PGA Championship	−8 (70-70-70-70=280)	Playoff^{1}	(United States) Jerry Pate, (United States) Dana Quigley
2009	JELD-WEN Tradition	−16 (70-67-66-69=272)	Playoff^{2}	(United States) John Cook

^{1}Defeated Pate and Quigley in a sudden-death playoff.
^{2}Defeated Cook in a sudden-death playoff with a birdie on the first hole of the playoff.

=== Results timeline ===
Results not in chronological order before 2022.

Tournament	2004	2005	2006	2007	2008	2009	2010	2011	2012	2013	2014	2015	2016	2017	2018	2019	2020	2021	2022
The Tradition	T45	T9	T39	T18	T41	1	T47	T35	T64	T50	T31	T41							
Senior PGA Championship	–	1	T23	CUT	T67	T44	T34	CUT	CUT	CUT	CUT	CUT	T44	CUT	CUT	CUT			CUT
U.S. Senior Open	T25	CUT	T29	T52	T32	T36	T28		T60	CUT		CUT							
Senior Players Championship	–	61	T22	T62	T65	T9	7	T64		T60	77	T47							
Senior British Open Championship	T57		T19	CUT	T32	T47	CUT	T31											

Win
Top 10
Did not play

CUT = missed the halfway cut
"T" indicates a tie for a place

== U.S. national team appearances ==
Professional

- World Cup: 1980
- Kirin Cup: 1988 (winners)

== See also ==
- Fall 1976 PGA Tour Qualifying School graduates
