= Dana Quigley =

American professional golfer (born 1947)

Personal information
- Full name: Dana C. Quigley
- Nationality: United States
- Born: April 14, 1947 (age 79) Lynnfield, Massachusetts, U.S.
- Height: 6 ft 2 in (1.88 m)
- Weight: 190 lb (86 kg; 14 st)

Career
- Sport: Golf
- College: University of Rhode Island
- Turned professional: 1971
- Former tours: PGA Tour; Champions Tour
- Professional wins: 32

Number of wins by tour
- PGA Tour Champions: 11
- Other: 21

Best results in major championships
- Masters Tournament: DNP
- PGA Championship: T41: 1980
- U.S. Open: T41: 1979
- The Open Championship: DNP

Achievements and awards
- Champions Tour money list winner: 2005
- Champions Tour Player of the Year: 2005

Dana C. Quigley (born April 14, 1947) is an American professional golfer.

== Early life and amateur career ==
In 1947, Quigley was born in Lynnfield, Massachusetts. In 1969, he graduated from the University of Rhode Island.

== Professional career ==
In 1971, Quigley turned professional. Quigley's career in regular tournament golf was unremarkable. He worked as a club professional for many years and had 18 tournament victories in local tournaments in New England. His best finish on the PGA Tour was sixth at the 1980 Greater Milwaukee Open.

In 1997, Quigley became eligible to play in senior golf tournaments, and he soon became a leading player at this level. His first win on the Senior PGA Tour came at that year's Northville Long Island Classic. In 2005, at age 58, he led the Champions Tour money list and became the oldest player to win the Arnold Palmer Award for the leading money-winner on the circuit. He won 11 tournaments on the tour and last played in 2019.

== Personal life ==
His nephew Brett Quigley played on the PGA Tour, and now plays on the PGA Tour Champions, where he has won.

== Awards and honors ==
Quigley was elected to the New England section of the PGA Hall of Fame in 2000.

== Professional wins (32) ==
=== Regular career wins (18) ===
- 1973 Rhode Island Open
- 1981 Rhode Island Open
- 1982 Massachusetts Open
- 1983 Massachusetts Open, New England Open
- 1984 Massachusetts Open, Maine Open
- 1985 New England PGA Championship
- 1986 Vermont Open
- 1987 Vermont Open
- 1989 New England PGA Championship
- 1991 New England PGA Championship
- 1992 Rhode Island Open
- 1993 Rhode Island Open, New England PGA Championship
- 1995 Rhode Island Open
- 1996 Rhode Island Open, New England PGA Championship

=== Champions Tour wins (11) ===
No.	Date	Tournament	Winning score	Margin of victory	Runner(s)-up
1	Aug 10, 1997	Northville Long Island Classic	−12 (67-67-70=204)	Playoff	(United States) Jay Sigel
2	Sep 6, 1998	Emerald Coast Classic	−10 (69-66-65=200)	1 stroke	(United States) Jim Colbert
3	Oct 16, 1998	Raley's Gold Rush Classic	−13 (71-68-64=203)	3 strokes	(England) John Morgan
4	May 21, 2000	TD Waterhouse Championship	−18 (65-67-66=198)	1 stroke	(United States) Tom Watson
5	Jul 23, 2001	SBC Senior Open	−16 (65-66-69=200)	5 strokes	(United States) Jay Sigel
6	Mar 17, 2002	Siebel Classic in Silicon Valley	−4 (67-75-70=212)	1 stroke	(United States) Bob Gilder, (United States) Fuzzy Zoeller
7	Oct 20, 2002	SBC Championship	−12 (68-64-69=201)	1 stroke	(United States) Bob Gilder
8	Jan 23, 2003	MasterCard Championship	−18 (66-65-67=198)	2 strokes	(United States) Larry Nelson
9	Jan 23, 2005	MasterCard Championship (2)	−18 (67-65-66=198)	Playoff	(United States) Tom Watson
10	Jun 13, 2005	Bayer Advantage Classic (2)	−11 (67-66=133) (Note: Shortened to 36 holes due to weather.)	Playoff	(United States) Gil Morgan, (United States) Tom Watson
11	Jul 2, 2006	Greater Kansas City Golf Classic (3)	−18 (67-68-63=198)	3 strokes	(United States) David Edwards

Champions Tour playoff record (3–5)

No.	Year	Tournament	Opponent(s)	Result
1	1997	Northville Long Island Classic	(United States) Jay Sigel	Won with par on third extra hole
2	1999	Novell Utah Showdown	(United States) Dave Eichelberger	Lost to par on first extra hole
3	2002	Bruno's Memorial Classic	(United States) Sammy Rachels	Lost to birdie on second extra hole
4	2005	MasterCard Championship	(United States) Tom Watson	Won with par on third extra hole
5	2005	Senior PGA Championship	(United States) Jerry Pate, (United States) Mike Reid	Reid won with birdie on first extra hole
6	2005	Bayer Advantage Classic	(United States) Gil Morgan, (United States) Tom Watson	Won with birdie on first extra hole
7	2005	JELD-WEN Tradition	(United States) Loren Roberts	Lost to bogey on second extra hole
8	2007	Boeing Greater Seattle Classic	(United States) R. W. Eaks, (United States) David Eger, (United States) Gil Morgan, (Japan) Naomichi Ozaki, (United States) Craig Stadler, (Zimbabwe) Denis Watson	Watson won with eagle on second extra hole Eger, Morgan, Ozaki and Quigley eliminated by birdie on first hole

=== Other senior wins (3) ===
- 2001 Hyundai Team Matches (with Allen Doyle)
- 2002 Hyundai Team Matches (with Allen Doyle)
- 2006 Wendy's Champions Skins Game (with Raymond Floyd)

== U.S. national team appearances ==
- UBS Warburg Cup: 2001 (winners)

== See also ==
- Fall 1977 PGA Tour Qualifying School graduates
- Fall 1978 PGA Tour Qualifying School graduates
- List of golfers with most Champions Tour wins
