= Siebel Classic in Silicon Valley =

The Siebel Classic in Silicon Valley was a golf tournament on the Champions Tour from 2001 to 2002. It was last played in San Jose, California at the Coyote Creek Golf Club.

The purse for the 2002 tournament was US$1,400,000, with $210,000 going to the winner.

== Winners ==
- 2002 Dana Quigley
- 2001 Hale Irwin
