= Commerce Bank Championship =

US golf tournament

The Commerce Bank Championship was a golf tournament on the Champions Tour. It started as non-sanctioned event in 1987, before becoming a regular Senior event in 1988.

The tournament was played annually in either June or July until 2008. It was last played in East Meadow, New York, at the Red Course at Eisenhower Park. Commerce Bancorp was the last sponsor of the tournament.

The purse for the 2008 tournament was US$1,600,000, with $240,000 going to the winner.

== Winners ==
Commerce Bank Championship

- 2008 Loren Roberts
- 2007 Lonnie Nielsen
- 2006 John Harris
- 2005 Ron Streck

Commerce Bank Long Island Classic

- 2004 Jim Thorpe

Long Island Classic

- 2003 Jim Thorpe

Lightpath Long Island Classic

- 2002 Hubert Green
- 2001 Bobby Wadkins
- 2000 Bruce Fleisher
- 1999 Bruce Fleisher

Northville Long Island Classic

- 1998 Gary Player
- 1997 Dana Quigley
- 1996 John Bland
- 1995 Lee Trevino
- 1994 Lee Trevino
- 1993 Raymond Floyd
- 1992 George Archer
- 1991 George Archer
- 1990 George Archer
- 1989 Butch Baird
- 1988 Don Bies

Northville Invitational

- 1987 Gary Player (not Senior PGA Tour event)
