= Peter Jacobsen =

American professional golfer (born 1954)

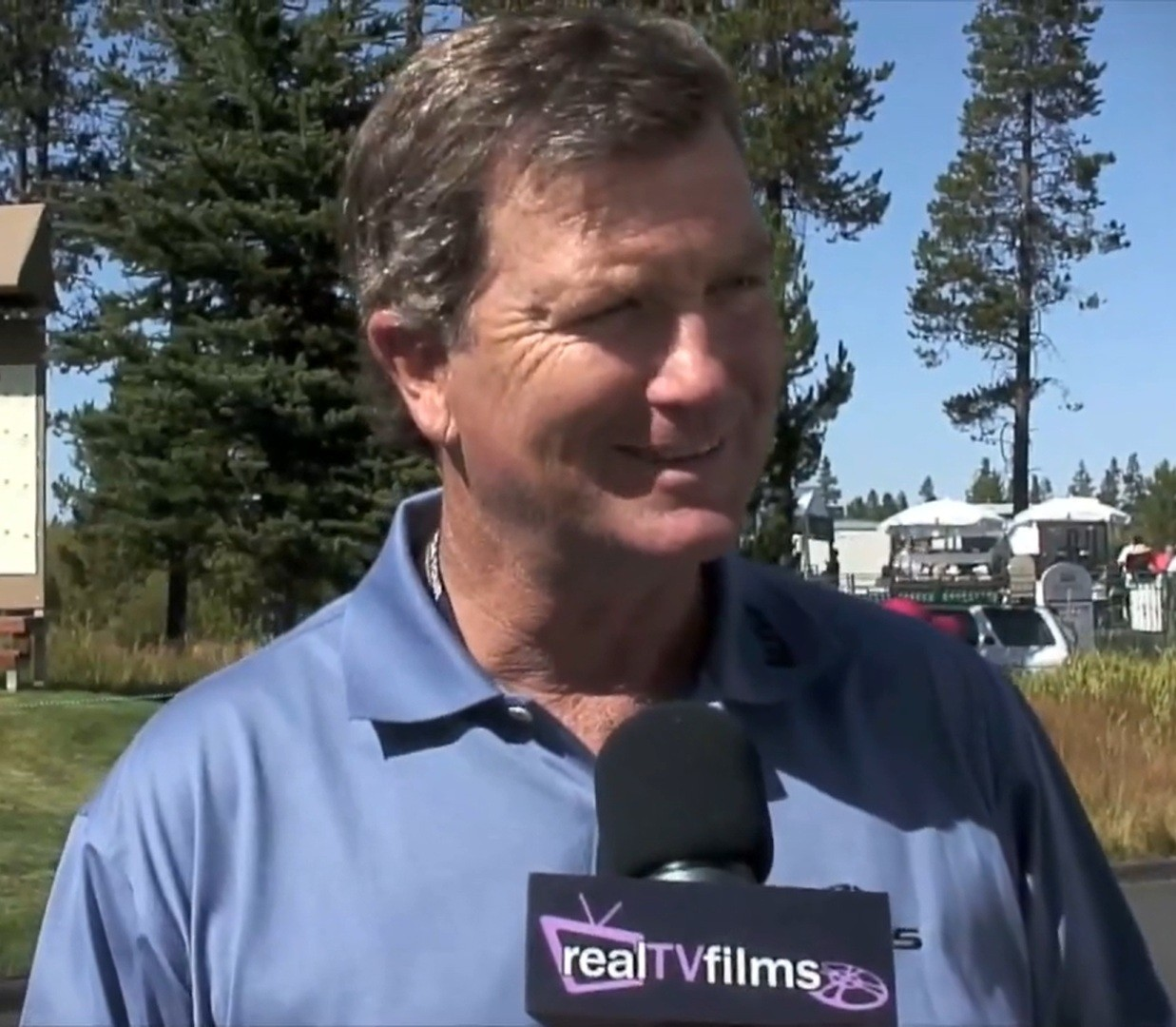
- Jacobsen in 2009

Personal information
- Full name: Peter Erling Jacobsen
- Nationality: United States
- Born: March 4, 1954 (age 72) Portland, Oregon, U.S.
- Height: 6 ft 2 in (1.88 m)
- Spouse: Jan (m. 1976)
- Children: 3

Career
- Sport: Golf
- College: University of Oregon
- Turned professional: 1976
- Current tour: PGA Tour Champions
- Former tour: PGA Tour
- Professional wins: 18
- Highest ranking: 15 (January 7, 1996)

Number of wins by tour
- PGA Tour: 7
- PGA Tour of Australasia: 1
- PGA Tour Champions: 2
- Other: 8

Best results in major championships
- Masters Tournament: T11: 1981
- PGA Championship: 3rd: 1983, 1986
- U.S. Open: T7: 1984
- The Open Championship: T11: 1985

Achievements and awards
- PGA Tour Comeback Player of the Year: 2003
- Champions Tour Comeback Player of the Year: 2005
- Old Tom Morris Award: 2012
- Payne Stewart Award: 2013
- (For a full list of awards, see here)

Peter Erling Jacobsen (born March 4, 1954) is an American professional golfer and commentator on Golf Channel and NBC. He has played on the PGA Tour and the Champions Tour. He has won seven events on the PGA Tour and two events on the Champions Tour, both majors.

== Early life and amateur career ==
Jacobsen was born and raised in Portland, Oregon. He graduated from Portland's Lincoln High School.

Jacobsen played college golf at the University of Oregon. He turned professional in 1976 after winning the Oregon Open as an amateur.

== Professional career ==
Jacobsen qualified for the PGA Tour in his first attempt, finishing in 19th place at the December 1976 qualifying tournament in Brownsville, Texas. He made steady progress during his first few seasons and captured his first title in 1980 at the Buick-Goodwrench Open. Jacobsen won twice on the tour in 1984 and broke into the top-10 on the money list for the first time. Two more wins in 1995 catapulted him to a career-best seventh place on the end of season money list. As a result of his performance during those two seasons, he was selected to play in two Ryder Cups, in 1985 and 1995.

Jacobsen won seven tournaments on the PGA Tour, the last at the 2003 Greater Hartford Open at the age of 49, making him one of the oldest to win on the PGA Tour. That year he was voted the Tour's comeback player of the year.

After turning fifty, Jacobsen competed mainly on the Champions Tour, although he also played on the PGA Tour for several years. In his first year of eligibility for senior golf in 2004, he won the U.S. Senior Open, one of senior golf's major championships, shortly after hip surgery. The following year, he added a second senior major title at the Senior Players Championship.

=== Broadcasting and business career ===
Away from competing, Jacobsen has presented two shows on the Golf Channel. Plugged In was a variety show, featuring music, story-telling and skits performed with co-host Matt Griesser, former star of the FootJoy SignBoy campaign, and Peter and Friends was a panel discussion show.

Jacobsen provided video and audio commentary for Golden Tee Golf, a video game from Incredible Technologies, including Peter Jacobsen's Golden Tee 3D Golf.

Jacobsen also owns Peter Jacobsen Sports. It is an event management company that has run several professional golf tournaments including the JELD-WEN Tradition, one of the majors on the Champions Tour. The company also runs the CVS Caremark Charity Classic, one of the PGA Tour's Challenge Series events. Until 2002 it also organized the Fred Meyer Challenge, a three-day charity event in Oregon. Jacobsen is also the face of Peter Jacobsen Challenge Keno and Peter Jacobsen Challenge Poker, two video gambling casino games.

== Personal life ==
Jacobsen is married to Jan. The couple married in December 1976. They have three children: Amy, Kristen, and Mick.

He is known for his laid-back, humorous personality. During the Fred Meyer Challenge, Jacobsen was known to do impressions of other players, such as Craig Stadler. The event was filmed and broadcast on the Golf Channel, and they have released a DVD and VHS of the footage, titled "Peter's Party." Jacobsen also appeared as himself alongside Kevin Costner in the 1996 movie Tin Cup, where he was the winner of the fictional U.S. Open.

A self-taught guitarist, Jacobsen was a founding member and lead singer of Jake Trout & The Flounders, a band he formed in the mid-80s with Mark Lye and Payne Stewart. The group is no longer together, but they recorded two albums.

== Amateur wins (1) ==
- 1974 Pacific-8 Conference Championship

== Professional wins (18) ==
=== PGA Tour wins (7) ===
No.	Date	Tournament	Winning score	Margin of victory	Runner(s)-up
1	Aug 24, 1980	Buick-Goodwrench Open	−12 (70-70-69-67=276)	1 stroke	(United States) Mark Lye, (United States) Billy Kratzert
2	May 20, 1984	Colonial National Invitation	−10 (64-71-65-70=270)	Playoff	(United States) Payne Stewart
3	Jul 29, 1984	Sammy Davis Jr.-Greater Hartford Open	−15 (67-69-63-70=269)	2 strokes	(United States) Mark O'Meara
4	Jan 21, 1990	Bob Hope Chrysler Classic	−21 (67-66-69-66-71=339)	1 stroke	(United States) Scott Simpson, (United States) Brian Tennyson
5	Feb 5, 1995	AT&T Pebble Beach National Pro-Am	−17 (67-73-66-65=271)	2 strokes	(United States) David Duval
6	Feb 12, 1995	Buick Invitational of California	−19 (68-65-68-68=269)	4 strokes	(United States) Mark Calcavecchia, (United States) Mike Hulbert, (United States) Hal Sutton, (United States) Kirk Triplett
7	Jul 27, 2003	Greater Hartford Open (2)	−14 (63-67-69-67=266)	2 strokes	(United States) Chris Riley

PGA Tour playoff record (1–3)

No.	Year	Tournament	Opponent(s)	Result
1	1981	Buick Open	(United States) Bobby Clampett, (United States) Hale Irwin, (United States) Gil Morgan	Irwin won with birdie on second extra hole
2	1984	Colonial National Invitation	(United States) Payne Stewart	Won with birdie on first extra hole
3	1985	Honda Classic	(United States) Curtis Strange	Lost to par on first extra hole
4	1989	Beatrice Western Open	(United States) Mark McCumber	Lost to par on first extra hole

=== PGA Tour of Australasia wins (1) ===
No.	Date	Tournament	Winning score	Margin of victory	Runner-up
1	Nov 25, 1979	Western Australian Open	−9 (71-70-70-68=279)	5 strokes	(Australia) David Graham

=== Other wins (7) ===
- 1976 Oregon Open (as an amateur), Northern California Open
- 1979 Oregon Open
- 1981 Johnnie Walker Trophy
- 1982 Johnnie Walker Trophy
- 1986 Fred Meyer Challenge (with Curtis Strange; Shared title with Greg Norman & Gary Player)
- 1989 Isuzu Kapalua International

=== Champions Tour wins (2) ===
Legend
Champions Tour major championships (2)
Other Champions Tour (0)

No.	Date	Tournament	Winning score	Margin of victory	Runner-up
1	Aug 1, 2004	U.S. Senior Open	−12 (65-70-69-68=272)	1 stroke	(United States) Hale Irwin
2	Jul 10, 2005	Ford Senior Players Championship	−15 (70-66-71-66=273)	1 stroke	(United States) Hale Irwin

=== Other senior wins (1) ===
- 2008 Wendy's Champions Skins Game (with Fuzzy Zoeller)

== Results in major championships ==
Tournament	1979	1980	1981	1982	1983	1984	1985	1986	1987	1988	1989
Masters Tournament			T11	T20	T20	T25	CUT	T25			T34
U.S. Open		T22	T37		T34	T7	T31	T59	T24	T21	8
The Open Championship					T12	T22	T11	CUT	WD		T30
PGA Championship	T23	T10	T27	T34	3	T18	T10	3	20	47	T27

Tournament	1990	1991	1992	1993	1994	1995	1996	1997	1998	1999
Masters Tournament	T30	T17	T61			T31				
U.S. Open	CUT	T31	63	CUT		T51	T23			
The Open Championship	T16	T73			T24	T31	T44			
PGA Championship	T26		T28	T28		T23	WD	T67		

Tournament	2000	2001	2002	2003	2004	2005	2006
Masters Tournament							
U.S. Open						T15	CUT
The Open Championship							
PGA Championship				CUT			

Top 10
Did not play

CUT = missed the half-way cut
WD = Withdrew
"T" = tied

=== Summary ===
Tournament	Wins	2nd	3rd	Top-5	Top-10	Top-25	Events	Cuts made
Masters Tournament	0	0	0	0	0	6	11	10
U.S. Open	0	0	0	0	2	7	17	14
The Open Championship	0	0	0	0	0	5	11	9
PGA Championship	0	0	2	2	4	8	18	16
Totals	0	0	2	2	6	26	57	49

- Most consecutive cuts made – 15 (1980 U.S. Open – 1984 PGA)
- Longest streak of top-10 finishes – 1 (six times)

== Results in The Players Championship ==
Tournament	1978	1979	1980	1981	1982	1983	1984	1985	1986	1987	1988	1989
The Players Championship	T52	T14	T5	CUT	T27	T16	T51	CUT	T33	CUT	T16	T70

Tournament	1990	1991	1992	1993	1994	1995	1996	1997	1998	1999	2000	2001	2002	2003	2004	2005
The Players Championship	T29	CUT	CUT		CUT	T29	CUT	T48		CUT					80	CUT

Top 10
Did not play

CUT = missed the halfway cut
"T" indicates a tie for a place

== Results in World Golf Championships ==
Tournament	2003
Match Play	
Championship	
Invitational	T14

Did not play

"T" = Tied

== Senior major championships ==
=== Wins (2) ===
Year	Championship	Winning score	Margin	Runner-up
2004	U.S. Senior Open	−12 (65-70-69-68=272)	1 stroke	(United States) Hale Irwin
2005	Ford Senior Players Championship	−15 (70-66-71-66=273)	1 stroke	(United States) Hale Irwin

=== Results timeline ===
Results not in chronological order before 2017.

Tournament	2004	2005	2006	2007	2008	2009	2010	2011	2012	2013	2014	2015	2016	2017	2018	2019
The Tradition	T4	T42	WD	WD		56		T60	24	WD	T46	T65				
Senior PGA Championship		T6	T7	T52				CUT	CUT	T35	CUT	CUT			CUT	WD
U.S. Senior Open	1	T26	T3	T33	CUT	CUT	WD	CUT	T17	WD	CUT	CUT		CUT		
Senior Players Championship		1	T45					T72	T62	T39	70					
Senior British Open Championship		T56	T40	CUT												

Win
Top 10
Did not play

CUT = missed the halfway cut
WD = withdrew
"T" indicates a tie for a place

== Awards ==
- 2003 PGA Tour Comeback Player of the Year
- 2003 Oregon Sports Hall of Fame
- 2006 Francis Ouimet Award
- 2012 Old Tom Morris Award
- 2013 Payne Stewart Award
- 2017 Northern Ohio Golf Charities Ambassador of Golf Award
- 2022 Golf Writers Association of America ASAP Sports/Jim Murray Award

== U.S. national team appearances ==
Professional

- Japan vs USA Match: 1984
- Ryder Cup: 1985, 1995
- Dunhill Cup: 1995
- Wendy's 3-Tour Challenge (representing PGA Tour): 1995, 2003 (winners), 2004 (Champions Tour)

== See also ==
- Fall 1976 PGA Tour Qualifying School graduates
