= Constellation Energy Classic =

US golf tournament

The Constellation Energy Classic was a golf tournament on the Champions Tour from 1998 to 2006. It was last played in Hunt Valley, Maryland, at the Hayfields Country Club.

The purse for the 2006 tournament was US$1,750,000, with $255,000 going to the winner. The tournament was founded in 1998 as the State Farm Senior Classic.

== Winners ==
- 2006 Bob Gilder
- 2005 Bob Gilder
- 2004 Wayne Levi
- 2003 Larry Nelson

Greater Baltimore Classic

- 2002 J. C. Snead

State Farm Senior Classic

- 2001 Allen Doyle
- 2000 Leonard Thompson
- 1999 Christy O'Connor Jnr
- 1998 Bruce Summerhays
