= Black Autonomy Network Community Organization =

Black Autonomy Network Community Organization (BANCO)
- Formation: 2003
- Headquarters: Benton Harbor, Michigan, United States of America
- Website: https://www.bhbanco.org/

The Black Autonomy Network Community Organization (BANCO) is a political and social justice coalition working in Benton Harbor, Michigan. The organization was founded in 2003 by Reverend Edward Pinkney, a Baptist minister, to protest the death of Terrance Shurn, an African American man killed during a pursuit by the Benton Harbor Police.

Since its inception, the organization has protested against perceived wrongdoings by police in the area, and against developments they believe displace the city's African American community.

== History and activities ==
=== Inception ===
BANCO was founded by Reverend Edward Pinkney, a Baptist minister, to protest the June 16, 2003 death of a 28-year-old African American, Terrance Shurn, while being pursued by Benton Harbor police. Some residents and eyewitnesses alleged that a police car rammed Shurn's motorcycle, causing it to crash, killing Shurn. The police denied that they had rammed Shurn's motorcycle, with a police chief stating that "the police car never got within 2 to 3 blocks of the motorcycle that caused the incident". BANCO organized rallies in the weeks following Shurn's death and the resulting disturbance. It had called for local and state authorities, as well as major regional businesses such as Whirlpool, to invest more into Black-owned businesses.

=== Subsequent activities ===
It has since broadened its scope to support candidates for local office. BANCO retains its focus on monitoring police activities.

==== Opposition to Harbor Shores ====
Beginning in 2004, BANCO led a campaign against the Harbor Shores development by Whirlpool, believing the development would increase economic inequality for African Americans in Benton Harbor.

BANCO has protested against The Golf Club at Harbor Shores, a golf course built as part of the development which has hosted PGA events. The construction of the course involved taking a portion of land from the Jean Klock Park, a public park in the area. In 2012, BANCO participated in a protest against a Senior PGA Championship event held at The Golf Club at Harbor Shores.

==== Stance on financial emergency laws ====
BANCO has opposed Public Act 4 of 2011, an amendment to Michigan's Financial Emergency laws which enabled the state government to place financially stressed municipalities under the jurisdiction of an emergency managers. The measure was successfully overturned by voters in a 2012 referendum. The state government subsequently passed an amended version, Public Act 436 of 2012, which was not subject to a referendum.

Benton Harbor was first placed under an emergency manager in 2010, which BANCO has criticized as a dictatorship. BANCO has criticized Benton Harbor's emergency management, saying it has stripped city officials of their power, cut city spending, and given away public land for private development.

== Edward Pinkney ==
BANCO was founded by Edward Pinkney, a Baptist minister, in 2003. Pinkney has been embroiled in a series of legal challenges pertaining to his advocacy in BANCO, some of which have been overturned.

In 1999, Pinkney pleaded guilty to embezzling more than $100 from his insurance company and spent 11 months in prison. Pinkney claimed that "the accusations were false" and that "the company was trying to get rid of me," and said he pleaded guilty to get the episode behind him.

In 2005, Pinkney organized a recall election to oust Benton Harbor city commissioner Glenn Yarborough, who had supported a development by Whirlpool in Benton Harbor that BANCO opposed. At the time, Pinkney was a resident of neighboring Benton Charter Township, and was therefore unable to vote in the election himself. The election took place on February 22, 2005, and the results showed Yarborough was ousted by a margin of 54 votes. However, Yarborough filed a complaint alleging Pinkney of voter fraud, alleging that Pinkney paid people $5 to vote in the election. The results of the initial election were annulled, and a second recall election was held, which Yarborough won. Following an investigation by the Benton County Sheriff’s Department, Pinkney was arrested for giving valuable consideration to influence the manner of voting by a person, influencing a person voting an absent voter ballot, and three counts of possessing absent voter ballots. Pinkney went to trial in a Berrien County court, and on March 27, 2006, the trial ended in a mistrial after the jury could not reach a unanimous decision on any of the charges. 10 of the 12 jurors found Pinkney guilty on three of the five charges, and were evenly split 6 to 6 on two of the charges. On March 29, 2006. County officials decided to retry Pinkney. In March 2007, a jury unanimously convicted Pinkney on all five charges. As a result of the retrial, Pinkney was sentenced to five years of probation. Pinkney appealed to the trial court for a new trial, claiming he was denied his constitutional rights to a public trial and to an impartial jury, he was never arraigned on the information, and because the information failed to specify which absent voter ballots he possessed. Pinkney's appeal was denied by the trial court. In 2008, Pinkney was jailed for violating probation after writing an article in the People’s Tribune, a Chicago newspaper, highly critical of the Judge who sentenced him. Pinkney was sentenced to three to ten years in jail. Pinkney called the judge "a racist" and "dumb", and called the judge's decision "fifth-grade". Pinkney also invoked a Biblical curse to condemn the judge, writing "The Lord shall smite thee with consumption and with a fever and with an inflammation and with extreme burning. They the demons shall Pursue thee until thou persist". The imprisonment was opposed by the Michigan chapter of the American Civil Liberties Union. Pinkney was jailed for 11 months, until the Michigan Court of Appeals reversed the trial court's revocation of his probation in July 2009.

While in prison in 2008, Pinkney ran unsuccessfully as a Green Party candidate for Michigan's 6th Congressional District in the House of Representatives against incumbent Fred Upton, a Republican from nearby St. Joseph, Michigan, and the grandson of a Whirlpool founder. Pinkney won 1.10% of the vote.

In 2009, Pinkney helped found Benton Harbor's NAACP chapter and was elected its president. However, about three years later, the state and national NAACP chapters launched an effort to oust Pinkney as the head of the chapter. One detractor said that the organization wanted to elect more effective leaders for the branch, claiming that Pinkney had overseen a sharp decline in membership. The detractor also said that Pinkney was obstructionist, and made unfounded charges against local business leaders.

Pinkney has decried the state's 2011 appointment of an emergency manager to handle Benton Harbor's finances.

Pinkney faced legal troubles again in 2014, when he was charged with five felony forgery charges and six counts of false certification of recall petitions. In November 2014, Pinkney was convicted of the five felony forgery charges, but found not guilty of the six counts of false certification of recall petitions. In December 2014, Edward Pinkney was sentenced to 2½ to 10 years in prison. Pinkney maintained his innocence. In May 2018, Michigan Supreme Court overturned the convictions, stating that felony forgery is intended to be a penalty rather than a chargeable offense.
