= Benton Harbor Fruit Market =

Historic marketplace in Michigan, United States

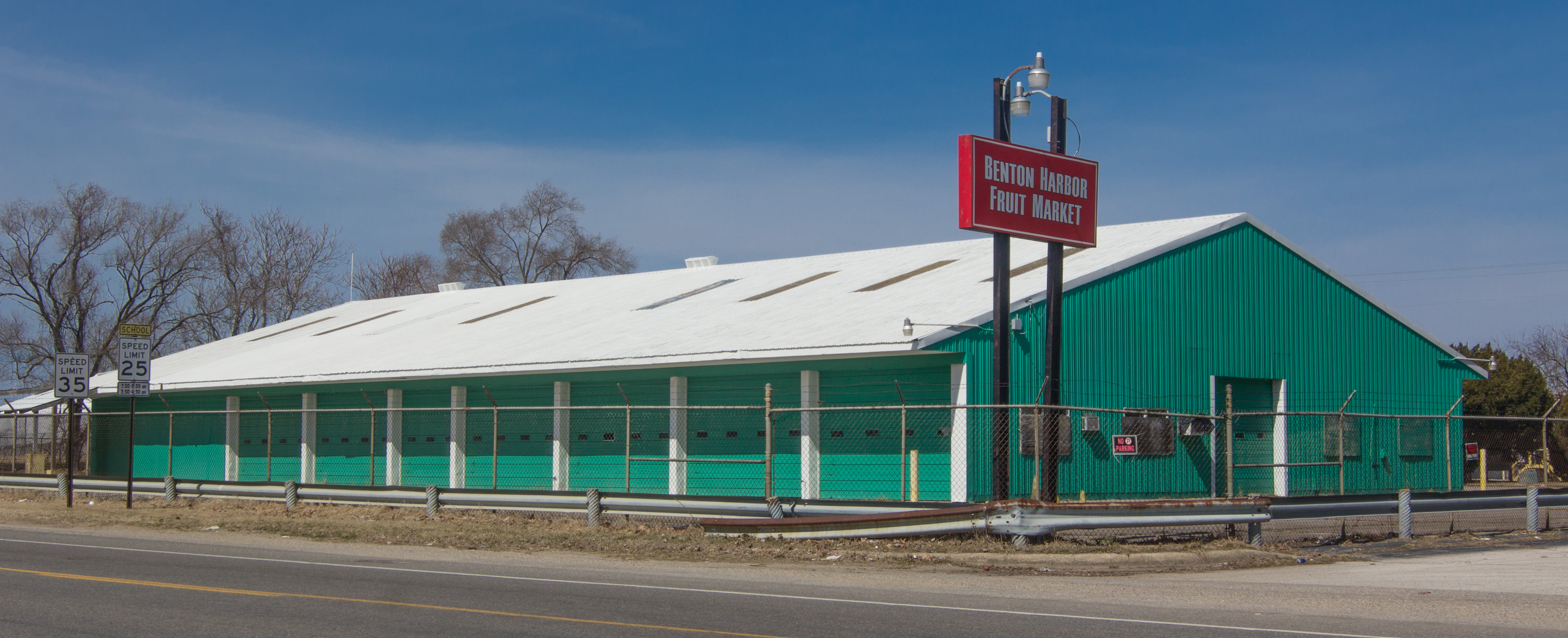
- Industry: Farm Produce and Markets
- Founded: 1860; 166 years ago
- Headquarters: 1891 Territorial Road, Benton Charter Township, Michigan, United States
- Area served: Southwest Michigan
- Owner: Benton Harbor Fruit Market Inc.
- Website: bentonharborfruitmarket.com

Benton Harbor Fruit Market is a farmers' market in Benton Charter Township, Michigan, US, on the border with Benton Harbor. It was established in 1860 in Benton Harbor as an outlet for Southwest Michigan farm products. By 2020, it operated four types of businesses including high volume wholesale produce, small wholesalers, retail, storage, and a market restaurant. Benton Harbor is located in Michigan's fruit belt and is situated part way between Chicago and Detroit. The market operates seasonally.

== History ==
At inception, the market operated from the city wharves on Lake Michigan. In the 1930s, when the primary mode of transport shifted from ships to trains and trucks, the market moved to the Flats District of Benton Harbor. In the 1940s the market had grown to the point that it was called "the largest cash-to-growers outlet in the world". The market supplied produce to restaurants, grocery stores, and retail customers. In 1960 the market accommodated 293 buyer stalls on a 16-acre facility which included wholesale and retail markets, a restaurant, and a migrant labor camp. The principal products sold at that time were strawberries, peaches and tomatoes, representing half of the entire United States sales of these crops. The market was owned and operated by the city of Benton Harbor, but since 1978 it has been owned and operated by Benton Harbor Fruit Market Inc.

The market moved to Benton Township in 1967.

On July 20, 1970, the market was the destination for a protest march organized by Michigan labor activists in support of the California Grape Boycott organized by Cesar Chavez, Dolores Huerta, and the United Farm Workers.

In 2010, the nearby Southwest Michigan Regional Airport sued the Market for eminent domain to gain five acres of the fruit market's land. In 2011 A Berrien County Circuit Court lawsuit resulted in a $2.25 million compensation to the market.

A plan to rehabilitate the former produce terminal in the Flats District began in 2026.
