= Dunedin Isles Golf Club Golf Course =

- Dunedin Golf Club Golf Course
- U.S. National Register of Historic Places
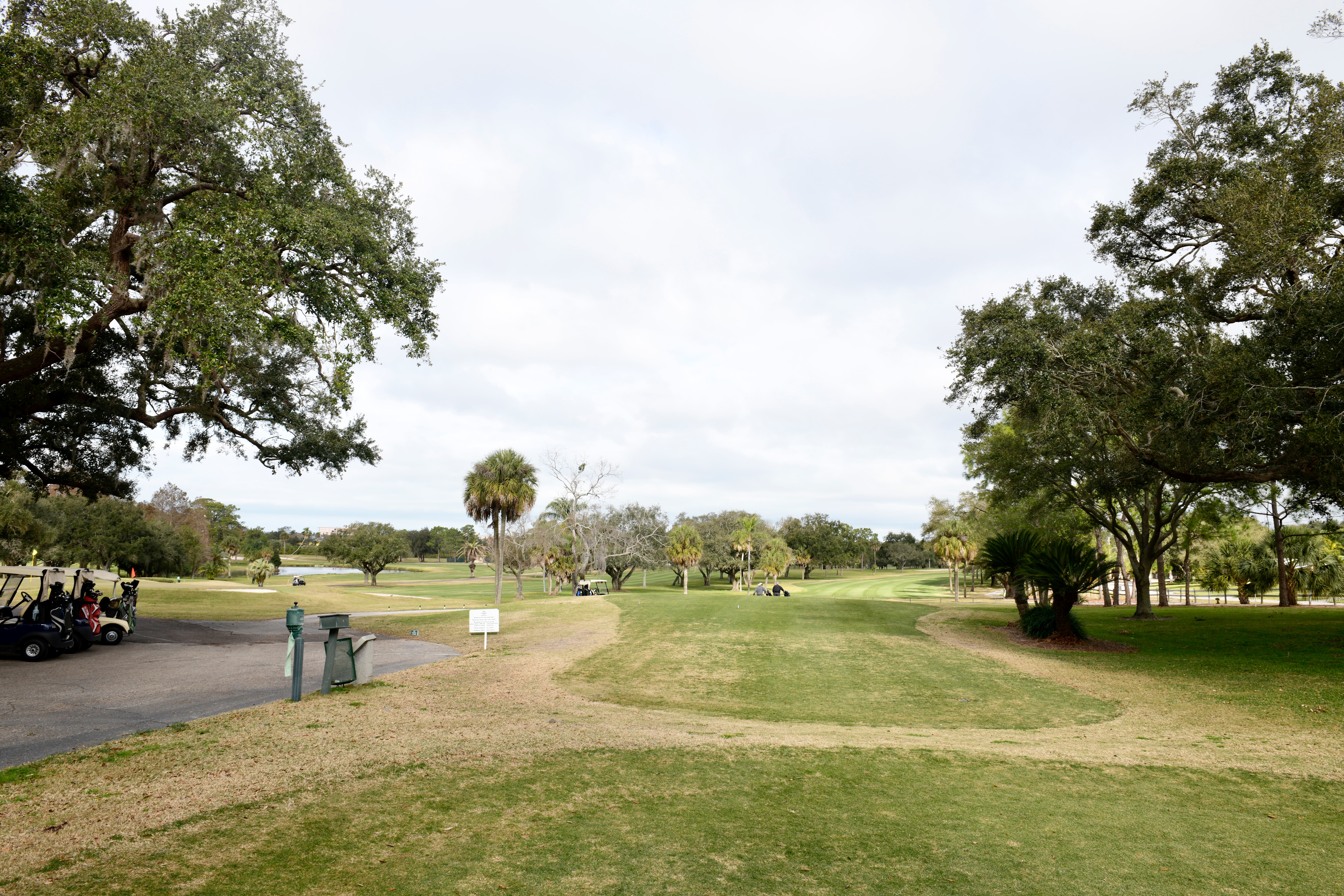
- Tenth hole

- Location within Florida Location within the United States
- Location: 1050 Palm Boulevard; Dunedin, Florida, U.S.
- Coordinates: 28°02′30″N 82°46′37″W
- NRHP reference No.: 14000283
- Added to NRHP: June 4, 2014

Dunedin Isles Golf Club Golf Course is a national historic site in Florida, located at Dunedin in Pinellas County.

It was added to the National Register of Historic Places in 2014.

Northwest of Tampa, the course was designed by noted architect Donald Ross (1872–1948). It opened 99 years ago in 1927 on New Year's Day as a municipal course, It was acquired by the PGA of America in 1944, renamed "PGA National Golf Club," and hosted the PGA Seniors' Championship for eighteen consecutive years (1945–1962). The PGA of America moved its national offices from Chicago to Dunedin in 1956, then sold its holdings in the course back to the city in 1962. It relocated its offices to eastern Florida in 1965 at Palm Beach Gardens.

== See also ==
- PGA National Golf Club - (1964–1973)
- PGA National Golf Club - (1981–present)
