= BHPL =

BHPL may refer to:

- Beverly Hills Public Library
- Benton Harbor Public Library
