= Edward Pinkney =

Edward Pinkney may refer to:

- Edward Coote Pinkney (1802–1828), American poet
- Edward Pinkney, founder of the Black Autonomy Network Community Organization
