= Benton Heights, Michigan =

- Census-designated place (CDP) & unincorporated community
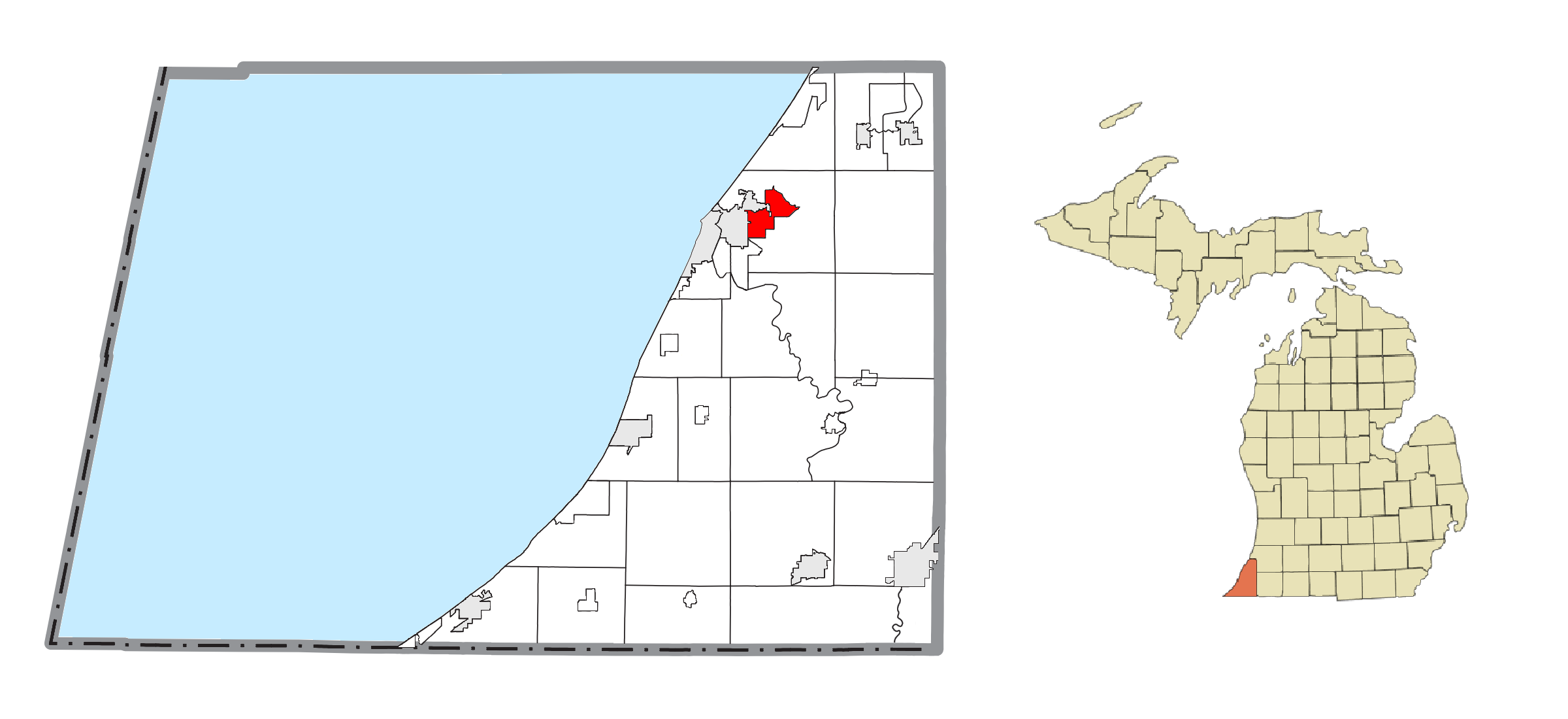
- Location within Berrien County

- Location within the state of Michigan Benton Heights (the United States)
- Coordinates: 42°07′52″N 86°24′26″W
- Country: United States
- State: Michigan
- County: Berrien
- Township: Benton

Area
  - Total: 3.86 sq mi (10.00 km^{2})
  - Land: 3.86 sq mi (9.99 km^{2})
  - Water: 0.0039 sq mi (0.01 km^{2})
- Elevation: 633 ft (193 m)

Population (2020)
  - Total: 3,652
  - Density: 946.4/sq mi (365.42/km^{2})
- Time zone: UTC-5 (Eastern (EST))
  - Summer (DST): UTC-4 (EDT)
- ZIP code(s): 49022
- Area code: 269
- FIPS code: 26-07540
- GNIS feature ID: 0621145

Benton Heights is an unincorporated community in Berrien County in the U.S. state of Michigan. It is also a census-designated place (CDP) for statistical purposes without any legal status as an incorporated municipality. Per the 2020 Census, the population was 3,652. The community is a part of Benton Charter Township and is adjacent to the city of Benton Harbor.

== History ==
Benton Heights was formerly called "Euclid Center"; the present name was adopted in 1957.

== Geography ==
According to the United States Census Bureau, the CDP has a total area of 3.9 square miles (10.0 km^{2}), all land.

== Demographics ==
Historical population
| Census | Pop. | Note | %± |
|---|---|---|---|
| 2000 | 5,458 | | — |
| 2010 | 4,084 | | −25.2% |
| 2020 | 3,652 | | −10.6% |
U.S. Decennial Census; 2010 2020

=== Racial and ethnic composition ===
Benton Heights CDP, Michigan – Racial and ethnic composition Note: the US Census treats Hispanic/Latino as an ethnic category. This table excludes Latinos from the racial categories and assigns them to a separate category. Hispanics/Latinos may be of any race.
| Race / Ethnicity (NH = Non-Hispanic) | Pop 2000 | Pop 2010 | Pop 2020 | % 2000 | % 2010 | % 2020 |
|---|---|---|---|---|---|---|
| White alone (NH) | 1,643 | 1,110 | 802 | 30.10% | 27.18% | 21.96% |
| Black or African American alone (NH) | 3,569 | 2,513 | 2,033 | 65.39% | 61.53% | 55.67% |
| Native American or Alaska Native alone (NH) | 22 | 20 | 15 | 0.40% | 0.49% | 0.41% |
| Asian alone (NH) | 5 | 4 | 10 | 0.09% | 0.10% | 0.27% |
| Native Hawaiian or Pacific Islander alone (NH) | 0 | 0 | 1 | 0.00% | 0.00% | 0.03% |
| Other race alone (NH) | 16 | 4 | 8 | 0.29% | 0.10% | 0.22% |
| Mixed race or Multiracial (NH) | 124 | 101 | 193 | 2.27% | 2.47% | 5.28% |
| Hispanic or Latino (any race) | 79 | 332 | 590 | 1.45% | 8.13% | 16.16% |
| Total | 5,458 | 4,084 | 3,652 | 100.00% | 100.00% | 100.00% |

=== 2020 census ===
As of the 2020 census, Benton Heights had a population of 3,652. The median age was 31.7 years. 32.9% of residents were under the age of 18 and 11.5% of residents were 65 years of age or older. For every 100 females there were 94.0 males, and for every 100 females age 18 and over there were 89.9 males age 18 and over.

86.7% of residents lived in urban areas, while 13.3% lived in rural areas.

There were 1,298 households in Benton Heights, of which 35.6% had children under the age of 18 living in them. Of all households, 24.3% were married-couple households, 24.3% were households with a male householder and no spouse or partner present, and 41.1% were households with a female householder and no spouse or partner present. About 29.9% of all households were made up of individuals and 9.3% had someone living alone who was 65 years of age or older.

There were 1,483 housing units, of which 12.5% were vacant. The homeowner vacancy rate was 2.6% and the rental vacancy rate was 9.8%.

=== 2000 census ===
As of the census of 2000, there were 5,458 people, 1,944 households, and 1,310 families residing in the CDP. The population density was 1,419.8 inhabitants per square mile (548.2/km^{2}). There were 2,175 housing units at an average density of 565.8 per square mile (218.5/km^{2}). The racial makeup of the CDP was 30.51% White, 65.63% Black or African American, 0.40% Native American, 0.13% Asian, 0.88% from other races, and 2.46% from two or more races. Hispanic or Latino of any race were 1.45% of the population.

There were 1,944 households, out of which 39.6% had children under the age of 18 living with them, 28.4% were married couples living together, 32.7% had a female householder with no husband present, and 32.6% were non-families. 27.6% of all households were made up of individuals, and 10.2% had someone living alone who was 65 years of age or older. The average household size was 2.74 and the average family size was 3.31.

In the CDP, the population was spread out, with 36.3% under the age of 18, 8.6% from 18 to 24, 25.8% from 25 to 44, 17.1% from 45 to 64, and 12.2% who were 65 years of age or older. The median age was 29 years. For every 100 females, there were 88.1 males. For every 100 females age 18 and over, there were 79.6 males.

The median income for a household in the CDP was $19,651, and the median income for a family was $22,610. Males had a median income of $24,740 versus $17,816 for females. The per capita income for the CDP was $9,959. About 31.3% of families and 38.0% of the population were below the poverty line, including 53.2% of those under age 18 and 19.6% of those age 65 or over.
