= BallenIsles =

Gated community in Palm Beach Gardens, Florida, U.S.

BallenIsles is a gated community in Palm Beach Gardens, Palm Beach County, Florida, United States. It is home to three golf courses at the BallenIsles Country Club, and was formerly the headquarters of the PGA of America, and former home to the PGA Tour Qualifying School through 1971. An award-winning golf club, it has been host to numerous PGA tour events and major golf tournaments, including the PGA Championship, Senior PGA Championship, and Men's Golf World Cup. In July 2013, BallenIsles Country Club earned the Board Room Magazine and Forbes Distinguished Clubs designation; and in 2022, it was voted Best Country Club & Best Golf Course 2022 in Palm Beach County.

== Geographic area ==
The subdivision is bordered on the north by PGA Boulevard, on the east by Military Trail, the south by Northlake Boulevard, and the west by Florida's Turnpike. The main road within BallenIsles is BallenIsles Drive. The road stretches between the north entrance on PGA Boulevard and the south entrance on Northlake Boulevard. The east entrance on Military Trail connects to BallenIsles Drive via East Island Ave.

The community of BallenIsles is made up of 1,575 residences in 33 neighborhoods. The residences are a mix of patio homes, golf villas, courtyard homes, and estate homes.

== Golf facilities ==
BallenIsles was originally the PGA National Golf Club (1964–1973), commissioned by Palm Beach Gardens patron John D. MacArthur as the home of the Professional Golfers Association. From 1973 to 1989, it was privately operated as JDM Country Club, before splitting from JDM and renaming to BallenIsles in 1989. There are three courses, and the East Course, originally named the Champions Course, hosted the 1971 World Cup, 1971 PGA Championship, Senior PGA Championship (1966–1973), and the first qualifying tournaments for the PGA Tour. The North and East courses were designed by Dick Wilson and Joe Lee. The South course was redesigned by Gene Bates Golf Design, and is reserved for members and their guests. The current PGA National Golf Club is adjacent to the west.

There are four golf associations, MGA (Men's Golf Assoc). MSGA (Men's Seniors), WNGA (Women's Nine Hole) and the WGA (Women's Golf). The WGA also holds an annual event on behalf of Play for P.I.N.K. and the MSGA raises money for the USGA 1st Tee program. The MGA's annual prostate cancer fundraising event benefits Scripps Research.

The BallenIsles Director of Golf, Jeff Fitzherbert, was named the 2016 Troon Golf PGA Professional of the Year. Teaching professionals include Chris Kaufman, voted by his peers as 2016 Florida Teacher of the Year in South East Florida, Matt Grobstein and Scott Dietrich. The staff also includes Annette Thompson, named as one of Top 50 Teachers by Golf for Women Magazine in 2012 and 2017 and named as one of top 25 U.S. women's teacher in Golf Digest.

== Other recreation ==
The subdivision has several playgrounds located within the development, as well as an outdoor exercise facility near the south gate with several circuit stretch stations and a running track. There are two dog parks inside BallenIsles. The Sports Complex features a swimming pool and hot tubs. The clubhouse offers a variety of dining options, event rooms, card rooms and meeting rooms. Outside the development, the PGA park is near the south gate, and has soccer and track fields for public use. The Palm Beach Gardens Municipal Building park is located near the east gate and has baseball fields for public use as well as playground facilities, outdoor stretch stations, a swimming pool, and a running track.

BallenIsles is located within walking distance of the PGA Commons shopping and dining area and within a five-minute drive from Downtown at the Gardens, the Gardens Mall shopping areas, and the Legacy Place condo complex. To the north, the Abacoa shopping district is within a ten-minute drive.

== Local schools ==
These are the assigned schools for the BallenIsles community.

=== High schools ===
- Palm Beach Gardens Community High School

=== Middle schools ===
- Watson B. Duncan Middle School

=== Elementary schools ===
- Timber Trace Elementary School

== Notable members ==
- Professional tennis players, Serena Williams and Venus Williams resided in BallenIsles and trained at the Sports Complex for more than a decade.
- Paul Manafort, lobbyist.
