= Clara Edmunds Hemingway =

American composer

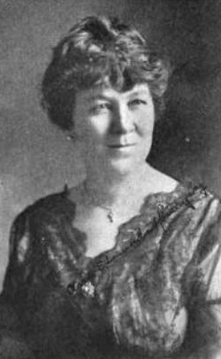
- Clara Edmunds Hemingway, from a 1920 publication
- Born: October 4, 1878; Tuscola, Michigan
- Died: December 31, 1958 (aged 80); Benton Harbor, Michigan
- Occupations: Singer, poet, composer, editor

Clara Edmunds Hemingway (October 4, 1878 – December 31, 1958) was an American poet, editor, composer, and contralto singer, based in the Chicago area.

== Early life ==
Clara A. Edmunds was born in Tuscola, Michigan, the daughter of Dennis Bowen Edmunds and Florence Davis Edmunds. Her father was a farmer when she was born, but later owned a veneer mill. She graduated from Benton Harbor High School.

== Career ==
Edmunds Hemingway was a noted contralto singer, whistler, and dramatic reader. She gave recitals, mainly in the American midwest. During World War I, she gave free recitals to raise funds for the Red Cross. One of her programs, "Stories in Stone" or "Rock Pictures", involved Lake Michigan rocks that she had painted to resemble Biblical figures, and her stories about them. Her original songs were popular with other touring singers in the early twentieth century United States.

Edmunds Hemingway published a book of sonnets, Oak Roots (1931). Her poems were published in a variety of collections and periodicals, and read over the radio. Some of her poems were written in Scots dialect, for example "She Slippit Awa'", which begins, "She slippit awa' sae peacefu' lak". She also collected old songs and tunes.

Edmunds Hemingway was a member of the National League of American Pen Women, the Illinois Woman's Press Association and the Gary Women's Press Club. She served on the Indiana and Illinois state boards of the Federation of Music Clubs. She had a poetry column in Viewpoints, a Chicago women's magazine. She was book review editor of Driftwind, a poetry magazine. She contributed a poem to the Bahá'í publication World Order, and wrote reviews for American Poetry Magazine. "Wherever there is a radio, a periodical, a newspaper one is sure to find the name of Clara Edmunds Hemingway," declared a 1929 profile.

== Personal life ==
Clara Edmunds married banker and real estate broker Ray Rolfe Hemingway in 1900. They had a daughter, Florence. Clara Edmunds Hemingway died in 1958, at a nursing home in Benton Harbor, Michigan, aged 80 years. Her papers are held in the Chicago History Museum.
