= PGA National Resort =

Golf course in Florida, United States

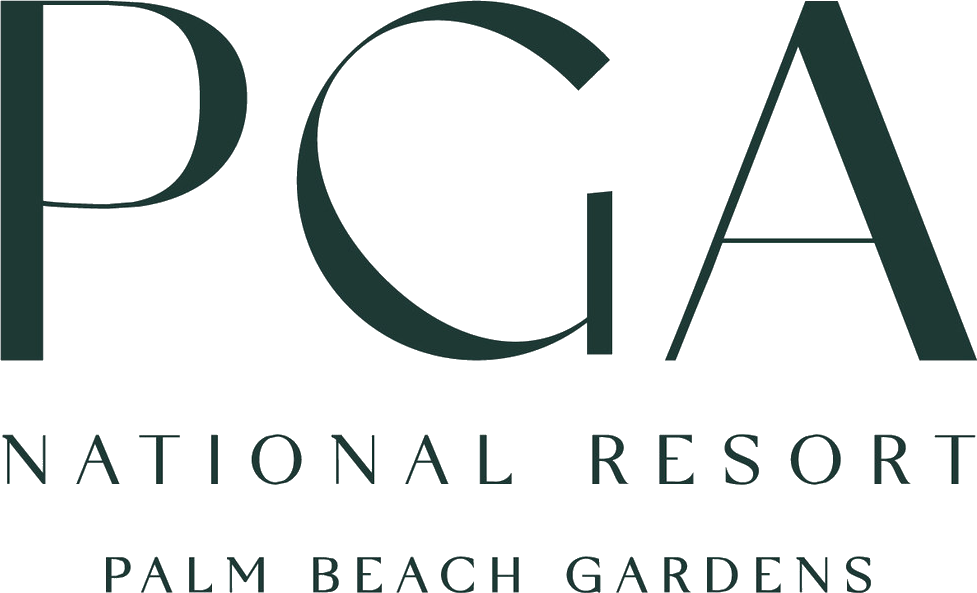

- Location within the United States Location within Florida
- 26.829°N 80.141°W

Club information
- Location: Palm Beach Gardens, Florida, United States
- Elevation: 16 feet (5 m)
- Established: 1980, 46 years ago
- Type: Public
- Owner: Henderson Park (in joint venture with Salamander Hotels & Resorts and South Street Partners)
- Total holes: 90
- Tournaments: The Honda Classic (2007–present); Senior PGA Championship (1982–2000); 1987 PGA Championship; 1983 Ryder Cup
- Website: pgaresort.com

The Champion
- Designed by: George & Tom Fazio redesign: Jack Nicklaus
- Par: 72
- Length: 7,048 yards (6,445 m)
- Course rating: 75.2
- Slope rating: 148

The Fazio (formerly The Haig)
- Designed by: George & Tom Fazio redesign: Tom Fazio II
- Par: 72
- Length: 6,806 yards (6,223 m)
- Course rating: 73.4

The Squire
- Designed by: George & Tom Fazio
- Par: 72
- Length: 6,465 yards (5,912 m)
- Course rating: 72.1
- Slope rating: 140

The Palmer
- Designed by: Arnold Palmer
- Par: 72
- Length: 7,079 yards (6,473 m)
- Course rating: 74.6
- Slope rating: 141

The Estates
- Designed by: Karl Litten
- Par: 72
- Length: 6,694 yards
- Course rating: 73.1
- Slope rating: 134

PGA National Resort is a resort in Palm Beach Gardens, Florida, United States. It has five championship 18-hole golf courses, the most famous of which is "The Champion", which has hosted the 1983 Ryder Cup, the 1987 PGA Championship, the Senior PGA Championship for 19 consecutive years from 1982 to 2000, and the PGA Tour's Cognizant Classic since 2007.

It was the home to the Professional Golfers' Association of America since the resort's establishment, but the PGA moved to new headquarters in Texas in summer 2022.

The resort also includes 339 hotel rooms, nine restaurants and lounges, a 34,000-square-foot conference wing, a 40,000-square-foot spa, 33,000-square-foot health and racquet club with 19 tennis courts, a golf academy, and a members club. It was sold by the developer, E. Llwyd Ecclestone Jr., to Walton Street Capital in 2006 for $170 million, before being sold again in 2018, to Brookfield Asset Management for $218m.

In January 2025, ownership changed again when Henderson Park acquired the property in a joint venture with Salamander Hotels & Resorts and South Street Partners.

== Courses ==
- The Champion – The Champion course opened in 1981 on November 17. It was the site of the Ryder Cup in 1983, the PGA Championship in 1987 (won by Larry Nelson), and the Senior PGA Championship for 19 years, from 1982 to 2000. The course underwent a $4 million renovation in December 2002 and became the home of The Honda Classic on the PGA Tour in 2007. The tough three hole stretch of the par-3 15th, par-4 16th, and par-3 17th holes is known as "The Bear Trap," named after Jack Nicklaus, who is nicknamed the Golden Bear and redesigned the course. The course was host to the 2018 Governor Cup for the first time in its history.
- The Fazio – Originally the Haig Course, named for golfing great Walter Hagen. It was the first course opened for play at PGA National Resort, on March 4, 1980, then was renovated and renamed The Fazio, after course architect Tom Fazio, upon opening in November, 2012.
- The Palmer – The Palmer, named for golfist and course designer Arnold Palmer, was the last of the original four courses built at PGA National, opening on February 28, 1984. The Palmer was previously named “The General”.
- The Estates – The Estates originally opened in November 1984 as Stonewall Golf Club, and has been part of PGA National since August 28, 1988.
- The Match – Borne from the old Squire Course, the Match Course opened for play in the fall of 2021 and was designed with match play in mind.
- The Staple – With holes ranging from 60 to 130 yards, this 9-hole course is intended for experimenting with shots and is for players of all abilities.

== Earlier clubs ==
=== BallenIsles ===
The original PGA National Golf Club (1964–1973) in Palm Beach Gardens was nearby to the east, and is now the BallenIsles Country Club. The Champions Course (now the East Course at BallenIsles) hosted the PGA Championship in 1971, won by Nicklaus in late February. It also was the site of eight consecutive Senior PGA Championships (1966–1973), and the original qualifying school tournaments for the PGA Tour.

=== Dunedin ===
An earlier PGA National Golf Club (1944–1962) was on the western side of the state at Dunedin, northwest of Tampa. Designed by noted architect Donald Ross (1872–1948), it opened 99 years ago in 1927 as a municipal course. Acquired by the PGA of America in 1944, the course was renamed and hosted the PGA Seniors' Championship for eighteen consecutive years (1945–1962). The PGA of America moved its national offices from Chicago to Dunedin in 1956, then sold its holdings in the course back to the city in 1962 and relocated to eastern Florida in 1965 at Palm Beach Gardens. Now the Dunedin Golf Club, the course was added to the National Register of Historic Places in 2014.

== Scorecard ==
PGA National Golf Club - The Champion
Tee	Rating/Slope	1	2	3	4	5	6	7	8	9	Out	10	11	12	13	14	15	16	17	18	In	Total
Black	75.2 / 148	365	437	538	376	171	488	226	427	404	3432	545	450	427	388	465	179	434	172	556	3616	7048
Gold	73.4 / 145	360	419	516	356	152	479	206	401	386	3275	525	425	408	370	442	163	412	161	546	3452	6727
Blue	71.8 / 138	345	393	495	336	138	468	186	381	360	3102	508	395	387	335	420	153	391	155	527	3271	6373
White	69.9 / 129	339	361	480	318	121	453	169	334	342	2917	476	346	377	323	411	143	353	131	507	3067	5984
SI	Men's	9	11	3	13	17	1	15	7	5		8	4	14	10	12	16	2	18	6
Par		4	4	5	4	3	5	3	4	4	36	5	4	4	4	4	3	4	3	5	36	72
Red	71.7 / 136	308	302	424	285	88	378	141	289	311	2526	411	260	293	286	367	110	325	111	456	2619	5145
SI	Women's	7	5	3	11	17	1	15	13	9		6	14	10	2	4	16	12	18	8
