= Omni PGA Frisco Resort & Spa =

Resort located in Frisco, Texas

- Interactive map of Omni PGA Frisco Resort & Spa
- Location: Frisco, Texas; 4341 PGA Parkway; 33°12′25.192″N 96°48′35.104″W
- No. of rooms: 500
- Owner: Omni Hotels & Resorts
- Architect: Gil Hanse, Beau Welling, Jeffrey Beers International
- Website: https://www.omnihotels.com/hotels/pga-frisco

Omni PGA Frisco Resort & Spa is a golf-oriented Omni Resort that opened on May 2, 2023 in Frisco, Texas.

== Features ==
The property is 660 acres, with 130,000 square feet of event space, two championship golf courses, a 10-hole short golf course, a driving range, a golf simulator, 14 restaurants/bars, 500 rooms, 10 private ranch houses, four pools, a PGA Coaching Center, and a PGA Superstore. The championship courses were done by Gil Hanse and Beau Welling and involved the planting of 2500 new trees. SB Architects and Robert Glazier Architects did the exterior. The interiors were done by Jeffrey Beers International.

== PGA ==
The property is shared with the PGA of America's headquarters and started its $520 million construction on May 4, 2021. Before construction, the resort was already scheduled for 26 championships through 2034 including the 2027 and 2034 PGA Championships. The first tournament hosted at PGA Frisco was the KitchenAid Senior PGA Championship, from May 25–28, 2023.

== Restaurants and bars ==
- Trick Rider
- The Apron + Bar
- The Lookout Lounge and Bar
- Toast & Tee Coffee Collective
- Green Cactus Cafè
- Bluestem Bar
- Leisure Pool Bar
- Ryder Cup Grille
- Ice House
- Lounge by TopGolf
- Margaret's Cones & Cups
- Fields Overlook
- The Bunker
- The Swing Bar

== Awards ==
- 2023 HSMAI Adrian Awards: Public Relations/Communications Silver Award
- 2023 Spas of America Top 100 Spas: #82, #1 in Dallas
- 2023 Spas of America Top 100 USA Spas: #65
- 2023 Smart Meetings Platinum Choice Award
- 2023 INT Interior Design Awards: Hospitality Spa & Wellness, Conference & Convention Center
- 2023 Liv Hospitality Design Awards: Best Architectural Design in North America
- 2023 Liv Hospitality Design Awards: Best Architectural Design Resort – Luxury
- 2023 GOLF Magazine Top 100 Golf Resorts in the World
- 2024 Convention South Readers Choice Award
- 2024 Northstar Meetings Northstar Stella Award
- 2024 Travel + Leisure World's Best Awards: #1 Texas Resort Hotel
- 2024 GOLF Magazine Top 100 Courses You Can Play in the U.S.
- 2024 Smart Meetings Smart Stars: Best Golf Resort
- 2024 Golfweek Top 200 Resort Courses in the U.S. | Fields Ranch West #76, Fields Ranch East #47
- 2025 Travel + Leisure T+L 500 List

== Notable events ==
Year	Date	Tournament	Winner	Score	Margin of victory	Runner(s)-up	Classification
2025	Jun 22	Women's PGA Championship	(Australia) Minjee Lee	284 (−4)	3 strokes	(United States) Auston Kim (Thailand) Chanettee Wannasaen	Women's major
2023	May 28	Senior PGA Championship	(United States) Steve Stricker	270 (−18)	Playoff	(Republic of Ireland) Pádraig Harrington	Senior men's major
