= Benton Harbor, Michigan =

City in Michigan, United States

- City
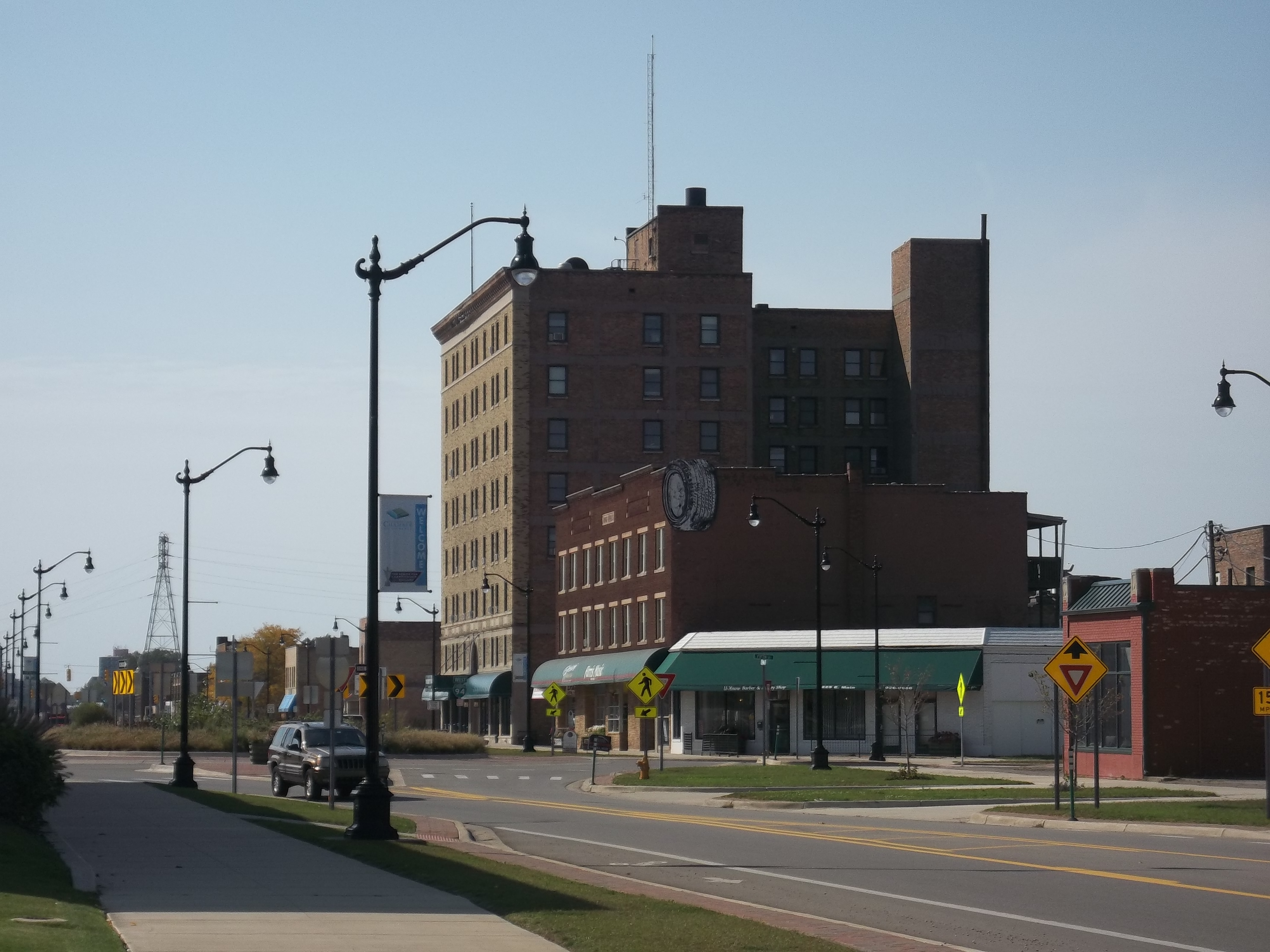
- Main Street in Downtown Benton Harbor

- Logo

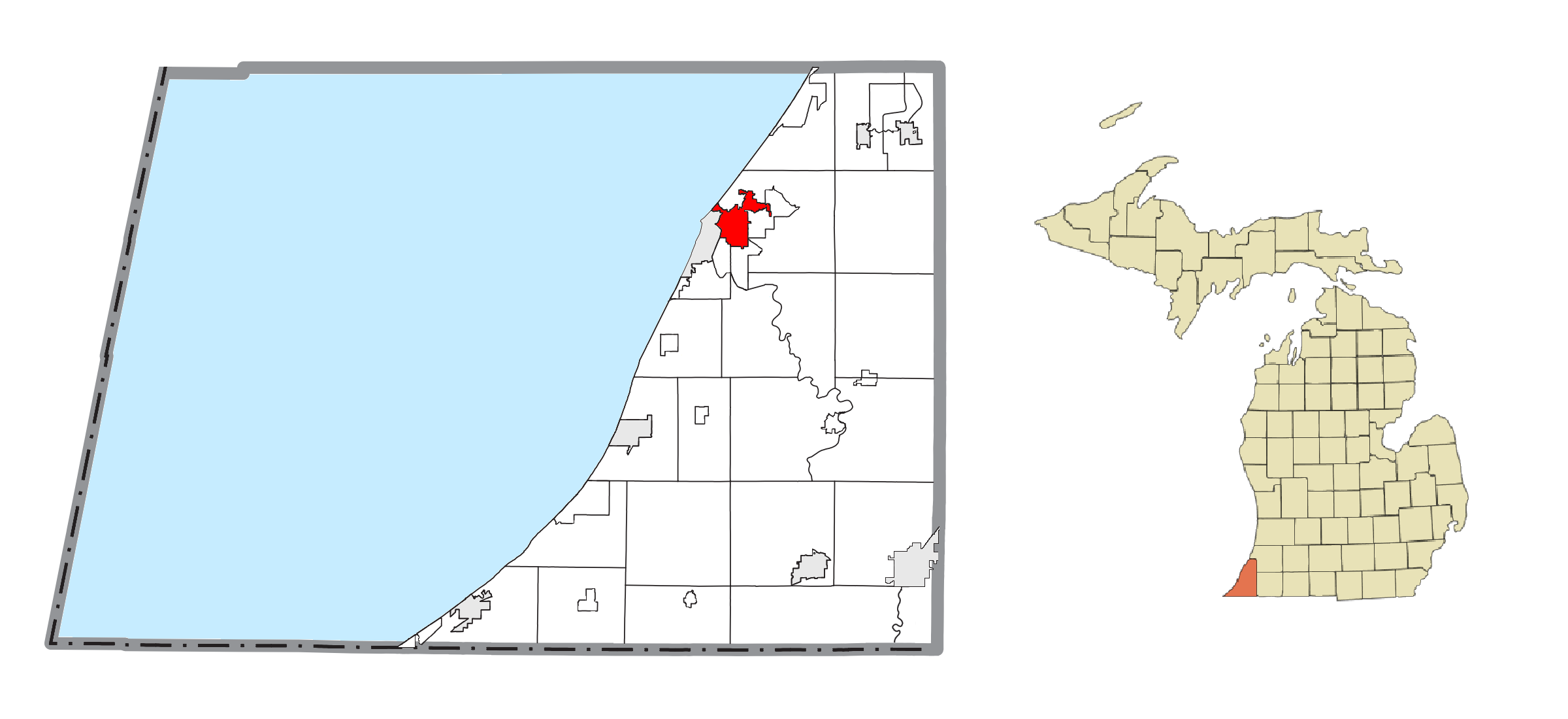
- Location within Berrien County

- Location within the state of Michigan Location within the United States
- Coordinates: 42°07′00″N 86°27′15″W
- Country: United States
- State: Michigan
- County: Berrien
- Incorporated: 1837 (village); 1891 (city)

Government
  - Type: Council–manager
  - Mayor: Marcus Muhammad

Area
  - Total: 4.63 sq mi (12.00 km^{2})
  - Land: 4.38 sq mi (11.35 km^{2})
  - Water: 0.25 sq mi (0.65 km^{2})
- Elevation: 590 ft (180 m)

Population (2020)
  - Total: 9,103
  - Density: 2,077.9/sq mi (802.27/km^{2})
- Time zone: UTC-5 (Eastern (EST))
  - Summer (DST): UTC-4 (EDT)
- ZIP code(s): 49022, 49023
- Area code: 269
- FIPS code: 26-07520
- GNIS feature ID: 0621144
- Website: bhcity.us

Benton Harbor is a city in Berrien County, in the U.S. state of Michigan. Located 46 miles southwest of Kalamazoo and 71 miles southwest of Grand Rapids, it had a population of 9,103 according to the 2020 census. It is the smaller of the two principal cities in the Niles–Benton Harbor Metropolitan Statistical Area, which has a population of 156,813.

Benton Harbor and the nearby city of St. Joseph developed on opposite sides of the St. Joseph River and are commonly referred to as the "Twin Cities". Fairplain and Benton Heights are unincorporated areas adjacent to Benton Harbor. The population is more than 80 percent African American.

== History ==
Benton Harbor was founded by Henry C. Morton, Sterne Brunson, and Charles Hull, who all now have or have had schools named after them. It was mainly wetlands bordered by the Paw Paw River, through which a canal was built, hence the "harbor" in the city's name. In 1860, the village was laid out by Brunson, Morton, Hull and others, and given the name Brunson Harbor.

Brunson, Morton, and Hull also donated land and solicited subscriptions for construction of the canal, which was completed in 1862. It had long been recognized that a canal would be crucial to the town's development, both to drain the marsh and to provide a berthing area for ships. The canal, originally 25 feet (7.6 m) wide but expanded to 50 feet (15 m) in 1868, led to the town's becoming a shipping and manufacturing center for the area. The eastern end of the canal was deemed non-navigable in 1937 and most of the rest was in 1963.

In 1865, the settlement's name was changed to Benton Harbor in honor of Thomas Hart Benton, a Missouri Senator who helped Michigan achieve statehood. In 1891, Benton Harbor was incorporated as a city. It was reported in 2026 that the same year, a merger had been attempted between Benton Harbor and St. Joseph.

Benton Harbor's retail establishments started relocating outside of the city starting in the 1950s, primarily to the nearby Fairplain Plaza which opened in 1958, and the city experienced an economic downturn between 1970 and 1985, partly due to The Orchards Mall nearby which opened in 1979.

The House of David religious group was founded there and once ran a local amusement park.

=== Riots ===
Benton Harbor has had two major riots, one in 1966 and one in 2003, with smaller ones occurring in 1960, 1967, and 1990.

==== 1966 ====
On August 30, 1966, a riot began after a meeting discussing recreational facilities and police relations with respect to black residents. During the riot, a black 18-year-old named Cecil Hunt was killed in a drive-by shooting; suspects were arrested but the assault charge was later dismissed. Governor George W. Romney dispatched troops from the Michigan National Guard, who stood down on September 5 when the riot dissipated.

==== 2003 ====
In June 2003, several citizens in Benton Harbor demonstrated for two days when black motorcyclist Terrance Shurn, being chased by a police officer, crashed into a building and died. As many as 300 state troopers and law enforcement personnel from neighboring communities were called to Benton Harbor.

A state task force produced a report about the incident later in 2003. Indirectly, the riot contributed to the Jimmy Carter Work Project's 2005 activities being held in Benton Harbor and Detroit.

=== Water state of emergency ===
As with the 2014–2019 public health crisis involving the drinking water in Flint, in 2018 higher-than-acceptable levels of lead were found in Benton Harbor's tap water. Water was starting to appear "bubbly and white" to "brown", with a "horrible" taste and poor smell. This was due to lead-based water service lines. Testing found the samples returned lead levels of 22 parts per billion, greater than the 20 parts per billion in Flint and the federal lead action level of 15 parts per billion. High levels of copper were also noted in the annual consumer confidence reports that have been required by Environmental Protection Agency.

Concerns were with the health impacts of lead poisoning. As a result, residents were supplied with free bottled water, including for use with brushing teeth and cooking, for residences and schools. In September 2021, $10 million was budgeted to replace the lead service lines. All lead pipes had been replaced by December 1, 2023, per the Michigan Department of Health and Human Services.

In 2026 a documentary about the crisis called A Benton Harbor Story was released.

=== Ox Creek restoration ===
In the 2020s Benton Harbor began a project to improve the area around Ox Creek, a stream that flows through parts of the city including the downtown area and drains into the Paw Paw River. Contributing parties are the Southwest Michigan Planning Commission metropolitan planning organization and the University of Michigan.

== Geography ==
According to the United States Census Bureau, the city has an area of 4.68 square miles (12.12 km^{2}), of which 4.43 square miles (11.47 km^{2}) is land and 0.25 square miles (0.65 km^{2}) is water.

=== Climate ===
Benton Harbor has a humid continental climate (Köppen: Dfa) that has very warm summers for the type and also less cold winters than many climates of the classification. Due to lake-effect snow there is very high snowfall relative to precipitation in winter, but far lower than some locations that are farther north in the state. Summer high temperatures range from 77 to 83 °F (25 to 28 °C) from June to August, but the apparent heat is normally moderated by mild nights.

Climate data for Benton Harbor, Michigan (Benton Harbor Airport), 1991–2020 normals, extremes 1887–present
Month	Jan	Feb	Mar	Apr	May	Jun	Jul	Aug	Sep	Oct	Nov	Dec	Year
Record high °F (°C)	68 (20)	73 (23)	86 (30)	90 (32)	97 (36)	104 (40)	104 (40)	102 (39)	98 (37)	94 (34)	82 (28)	69 (21)	104 (40)
Mean maximum °F (°C)	51.9 (11.1)	55.8 (13.2)	70.8 (21.6)	80.3 (26.8)	89.6 (32.0)	92.1 (33.4)	94.4 (34.7)	92.6 (33.7)	89.7 (32.1)	81.1 (27.3)	67.3 (19.6)	56.9 (13.8)	96.5 (35.8)
Mean daily maximum °F (°C)	33.2 (0.7)	35.7 (2.1)	46.8 (8.2)	59.3 (15.2)	70.1 (21.2)	79.5 (26.4)	83.1 (28.4)	81.4 (27.4)	75.5 (24.2)	63.1 (17.3)	49.4 (9.7)	37.8 (3.2)	59.6 (15.3)
Daily mean °F (°C)	26.3 (−3.2)	28.5 (−1.9)	37.3 (2.9)	48.1 (8.9)	58.5 (14.7)	68.1 (20.1)	72.6 (22.6)	70.9 (21.6)	64.5 (18.1)	53.4 (11.9)	41.6 (5.3)	31.6 (−0.2)	50.1 (10.1)
Mean daily minimum °F (°C)	19.5 (−6.9)	21.2 (−6.0)	27.7 (−2.4)	36.9 (2.7)	47.0 (8.3)	56.6 (13.7)	62.1 (16.7)	60.4 (15.8)	53.6 (12.0)	43.8 (6.6)	33.8 (1.0)	25.3 (−3.7)	40.7 (4.8)
Mean minimum °F (°C)	−2.9 (−19.4)	3.1 (−16.1)	9.2 (−12.7)	21.4 (−5.9)	31.6 (−0.2)	40.4 (4.7)	47.5 (8.6)	47.0 (8.3)	37.2 (2.9)	27.8 (−2.3)	19.0 (−7.2)	7.7 (−13.5)	−5.1 (−20.6)
Record low °F (°C)	−21 (−29)	−13 (−25)	−9 (−23)	9 (−13)	23 (−5)	31 (−1)	37 (3)	36 (2)	23 (−5)	15 (−9)	−1 (−18)	−15 (−26)	−21 (−29)
Average precipitation inches (mm)	2.46 (62)	1.89 (48)	2.26 (57)	3.76 (96)	3.85 (98)	3.60 (91)	3.30 (84)	3.90 (99)	3.40 (86)	4.40 (112)	3.01 (76)	2.33 (59)	38.16 (969)
Average snowfall inches (cm)	29.5 (75)	18.8 (48)	7.7 (20)	1.1 (2.8)	0.0 (0.0)	0.0 (0.0)	0.0 (0.0)	0.0 (0.0)	0.0 (0.0)	0.2 (0.51)	3.8 (9.7)	16.6 (42)	77.7 (197)
Average extreme snow depth inches (cm)	13.5 (34)	9.8 (25)	5.5 (14)	0.5 (1.3)	0.0 (0.0)	0.0 (0.0)	0.0 (0.0)	0.0 (0.0)	0.0 (0.0)	0.0 (0.0)	2.3 (5.8)	6.2 (16)	16.7 (42)
Average precipitation days (≥ 0.01 in)	13.6	9.6	9.7	12.3	11.4	9.7	7.6	9.0	9.1	11.1	10.2	12.6	125.9
Average snowy days (≥ 0.1 in)	10.2	7.6	3.0	0.8	0.0	0.0	0.0	0.0	0.0	0.1	2.1	7.3	31.1
Source: NOAA

== Demographics ==
Historical population
Census	Pop.	Note	%±
1870	661		—
1880	1,230		86.1%
1890	3,692		200.2%
1900	6,562		77.7%
1910	9,185		40.0%
1920	12,233		33.2%
1930	15,434		26.2%
1940	16,668		8.0%
1950	18,769		12.6%
1960	19,136		2.0%
1970	16,481		−13.9%
1980	14,707		−10.8%
1990	12,818		−12.8%
2000	11,182		−12.8%
2010	10,038		−10.2%
2020	9,103		−9.3%
U.S. Decennial Census; 2010 2020

=== Racial and ethnic composition ===
Benton Harbor city, Michigan – Racial and ethnic composition Note: the US Census treats Hispanic/Latino as an ethnic category. This table excludes Latinos from the racial categories and assigns them to a separate category. Hispanics/Latinos may be of any race.
Race / Ethnicity (NH = Non-Hispanic)	Pop 2000	Pop 2010	Pop 2020	% 2000	% 2010	% 2020
White alone (NH)	600	641	679	5.37%	6.39%	7.46%
Black or African American alone (NH)	10,303	8,899	7,569	92.14%	88.65%	83.15%
Native American or Alaska Native alone (NH)	17	30	24	0.15%	0.30%	0.26%
Asian alone (NH)	15	6	13	0.13%	0.06%	0.14%
Native Hawaiian or Pacific Islander alone (NH)	4	4	5	0.04%	0.04%	0.05%
Other race alone (NH)	8	12	44	0.07%	0.12%	0.48%
Mixed race or Multiracial (NH)	170	226	302	1.52%	2.25%	3.32%
Hispanic or Latino (any race)	65	220	467	0.58%	2.19%	5.13%
Total	11,182	10,038	9,103	100.00%	100.00%	100.00%

=== 2020 census ===
As of the 2020 census, Benton Harbor had a population of 9,103. The median age was 31.8 years. 32.2% of residents were under the age of 18 and 10.6% were 65 years of age or older. For every 100 females, there were 86.7 males, and for every 100 females age 18 and over, there were 79.0 males age 18 and over.

99.8% of residents lived in urban areas, while 0.2% lived in rural areas.

There were 3,329 households, of which 38.9% had children under the age of 18 living in them. Of all households, 18.5% were married-couple households, 22.1% were households with a male householder and no spouse or partner present, and 52.0% were households with a female householder and no spouse or partner present. About 30.7% of all households were made up of individuals, and 9.0% had someone living alone who was 65 years of age or older.

There were 3,795 housing units, of which 12.3% were vacant. The homeowner vacancy rate was 1.8% and the rental vacancy rate was 6.8%.

=== 2010 census ===
As of the census of 2010, there were 10,038 people, 3,548 households, and 2,335 families residing in the city. The population density was 2,265.9 inhabitants per square mile (874.9/km^{2}). There were 4,329 housing units at an average density of 977.2 per square mile (377.3/km^{2}). The racial makeup of the city was 89.2% African American, 7.0% White, 0.3% Native American, 0.1% Asian, 0.8% from other races, and 2.6% from two or more races. Hispanic or Latino of any race were 2.2% of the population.

There were 3,548 households, of which 44.3% had children under the age of 18 living with them, 17.0% were married couples living together, 43.2% had a female householder with no husband present, 5.6% had a male householder with no wife present, and 34.2% were non-families. 28.6% of all households were made up of individuals, and 6.9% had someone living alone who was 65 years of age or older. The average household size was 2.77 and the average family size was 3.41.

The median age in the city was 28.3 years. 35.1% of residents were under the age of 18; 10.4% were between the ages of 18 and 24; 24.5% were from 25 to 44; 22.2% were from 45 to 64; and 7.7% were 65 years of age or older. The gender makeup of the city was 46.5% male and 53.5% female.

=== 2000 census ===
At the 2000 census, there were 11,182 people, 3,767 households and 2,557 families residing in the city. The population density was 2,545.7 inhabitants per square mile (982.9/km^{2}). There were 4,492 housing units at an average density of 1,022.7 per square mile (394.9/km^{2}). The racial makeup of the city was 92.40% African American, 5.48% White, 0.15% Native American, 0.13% Asian, 0.04% Pacific Islander, 0.14% from other races, and 1.65% from two or more races. Hispanic or Latino of any race were 0.58% of the population.

There were 3,767 households, of which 42.0% had children under the age of 18 living with them, 20.8% were married couples living together, 42.0% had a female householder with no husband present, and 32.1% were non-families. 26.6% of all households were made up of individuals, and 8.2% had someone living alone who was 65 years of age or older. The average household size was 2.91 and the average family size was 3.53.

Age distribution was 39.6% under the age of 18, 9.8% from 18 to 24, 25.9% from 25 to 44, 16.5% from 45 to 64, and 8.2% who were 65 years of age or older. The median age was 25 years. For every 100 females, there were 83.3 males. For every 100 females age 18 and over, there were 72.7 males.

The median household income was $17,471, and the median family income was $19,250. Males had a median income of $27,154 versus $20,105 for females. The per capita income for the city was $8,965, the lowest in Michigan. About 39.6% of families and 42.6% of the population were below the poverty line, including 52.5% of those under age 18 and 29.7% of those age 65 or over.

== Government ==
The Michigan Treasury Department in 2009 sent a team to look into the city's finances. The team's report was a long list of mismanagement to the point that budgets were "effectively meaningless as a financial management tool." The city was $10 million underfunded in its pension fund and increasing budget deficits. In April 2010, governor Jennifer Granholm appointed Joseph Harris as Emergency Financial Manager. City staff was reduced by 30 to 70.

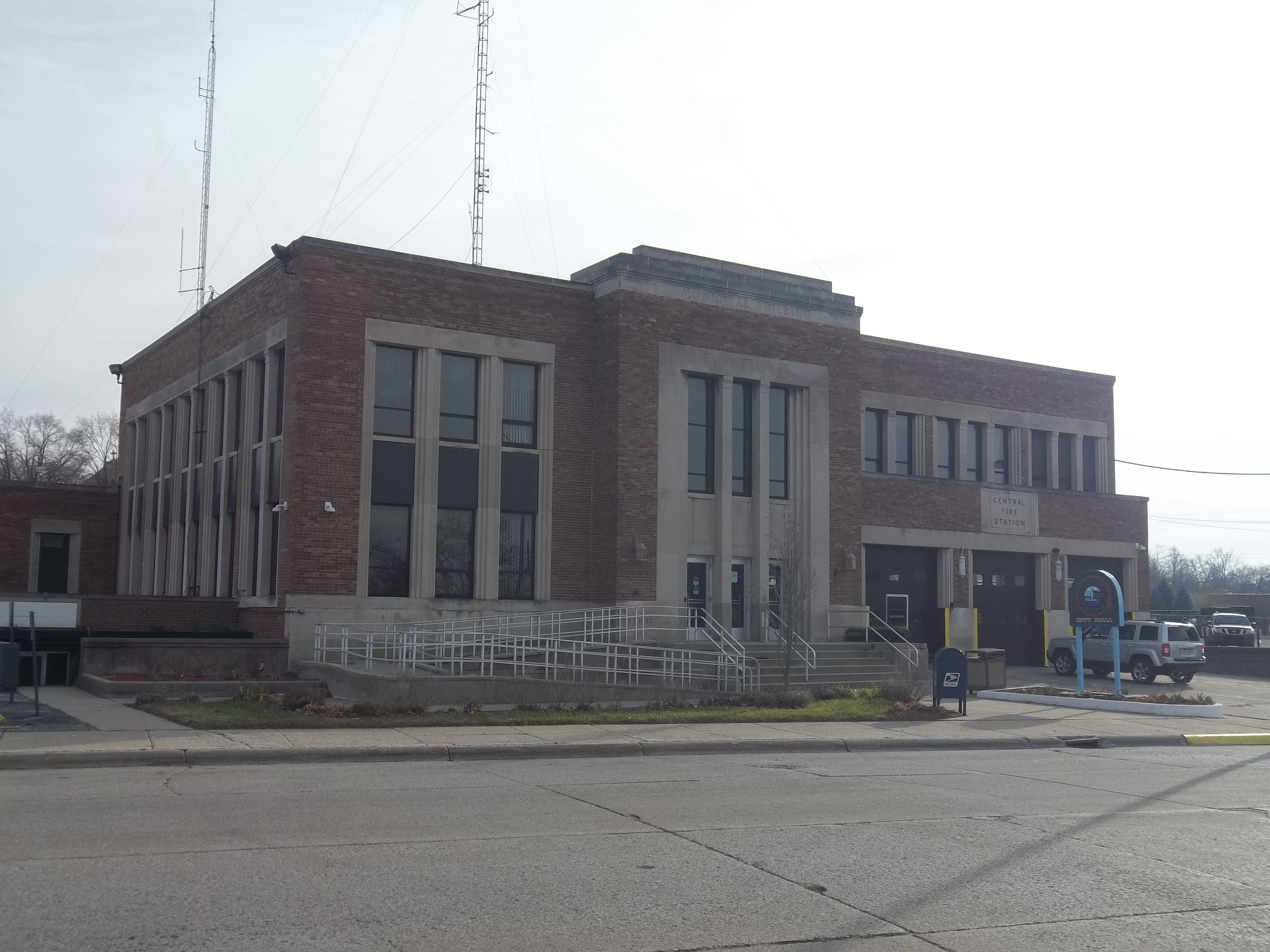
Benton Harbor City Hall

Harris was given expanded powers under a new law signed in March 2011 by governor Rick Snyder. Harris was previously the chief financial officer for the city of Detroit. On April 14, 2011, Harris suspended the decision-making powers of Benton Harbor's elected city officials, who can hold meetings but are not allowed to govern. The Michigan AFL–CIO president called the move "sad news for democracy in Michigan", but at least one city official, City Commissioner Bryan Joseph, supported it, saying the city had been mismanaged for decades.

On January 4, 2012, city commissioners Marcus Muhammad and MaryAlice Adams held a press conference where they stated that if there was still an emergency financial manager administering the city when Benton Harbor hosted the Senior PGA Championship in May, an "Occupy PGA movement should sit in on the golf greens and driving ranges in protest." Occupy PGA held protest marches on multiple days during the tournament, but did not disrupt the tournament.

On January 11, 2013, the Emergency Financial Assistance Loan Board (ELB) voted to replace Harris as the Emergency Financial Manager (EFM) for the city. On February 1, 2013, the ELB appointed Tony R. Saunders II as the youngest Successor-Emergency Financial Manager for the city of Benton Harbor.

Library service for the city is provided by the Benton Harbor Public Library.

The town has a police department.

=== Mayors ===
Mayors of Benton Harbor, Michigan

Image	Mayor	Years	Notes
	Fred A. Hobbes	1891 – ?	Served one term
		?	
	F. Joseph Flaugh	? – 1955	
	Alfred Hinkleman	1956 – 1957	
	Wilbert Smith	1957–1970	Served seven terms
	Charles F. Joseph	1971–1975	First African-American mayor of Benton Harbor
	Joel C. Patterson	1976–1979; 1980–1981	
	Wilce Cooke	1982–1983; 1984–1987	Previously served on the Benton Harbor charter commission Died August 3, 2021
	William Wolf	1987–1990	
	Emma J. Hull	1991–1997	Former supervisor of the Expanded Food and Nutrition Program at Michigan State University. First woman mayor
	Wilce Cooke (2nd term)	2004–2007; 2007–2011	
	James Hightower (mayor)	2012–2015	
	Marcus Muhammad	2015–Present	

== Education ==
The city is served by two institutions, Benton Harbor Area Schools within the Berrien Regional Education Service Agency, and Lake Michigan College, a two-year community college just east of Benton Harbor.

== Economy ==
Whirlpool Corporation, the world's largest manufacturer of major home appliances, has its corporate headquarters in nearby Benton Charter Township, along with a Riverview campus near the St. Joseph River in Benton Harbor and the Technical Center in St. Joseph.

== Community organizations ==
Black Autonomy Network Community Organization (BANCO) is a political and social justice coalition working in Benton Harbor.

The Benton Harbor Arts Association was founded in 1998 to promote a vibrant Benton Harbor Arts District.

== Transportation ==
=== Major highways ===
- I-94 bypasses the city to the east and south, connecting with Kalamazoo and Detroit to the east and with Michigan City, Indiana, and Chicago, Illinois, to the south and southwest.
- BL I-94 travels through the downtowns of both Benton Harbor and St. Joseph. It mostly follows the former route of US 12.
- I-196 begins nearby in Benton Township and continues northerly toward Holland, ending at Grand Rapids.
- US 31 is currently a freeway (the St. Joseph Valley Parkway) from the Indiana border north, entering a partial cloverleaf with Main St. and I-94 connecting downtown Benton Harbor with US 31
- M-63 serves as a loop route connecting with I-196 at the north and running through downtown St. Joseph. M-63 continues on to I-94 and then to M-139, where it ends. M-63 follows the former route of US 33.
- M-139 begins at US 12 near Niles and terminates at BL I-94 on the Benton Harbor–Benton Township border (the northbound direction terminates wholly within Benton Township). M-139 follows a former route of US 31 south of I-94.

Spanning the Paw Paw River and providing an additional connection to St. Joseph, the Charles Freeman Joseph bridge on Whitwam Drive, is named for Benton Harbor's first black mayor, opened in late 2005.

=== Rail ===
The Amtrak station in St. Joseph is served daily by Amtrak's Pere Marquette passenger train.

=== Bus ===
Twin Cities Area Transportation Authority (TCATA) provides bus transit throughout Benton Harbor and the surrounding areas. Originally strictly a dial-a-ride service, it has recently expanded to include three fixed routes—Red Route, Green Route and Blue Route. Red Route serves Benton Harbor, St. Joseph, St. Joseph Charter Township, Lincoln Township, and Royalton Township. Blue and Green routes operate throughout Benton Harbor and Benton Township.

=== Air ===
Southwest Michigan Regional Airport provides non-commercial air service.

=== Shipping ===
Both Benton Harbor and neighboring St. Joseph are commercial ports that receive bulk goods from lake freighters.

== Media ==
Benton Harbor is served by The Herald-Palladium newspaper, whose offices are in nearby St. Joseph Township, and is part of the South Bend/Elkhart television market. The Benton Spirit community newspaper has also served the community for the past 10 years. The paper was acknowledged by former Governor Granholm's 2003 Benton Harbor Task Force Report as a key communications stakeholder that "proactively assists in the total development of Benton Harbor". Benton Harbor is served by sister radio stations WCXT, WCSY-FM, WIRX, WQYQ, WRRA-FM, WSJM-FM, and WYTZ-FM, as well as WHFB and some in the South Bend market. Additionally, most of the Chicago market TV and radio stations are available from 60 miles (97 km) across the lake.

== Points of interest ==
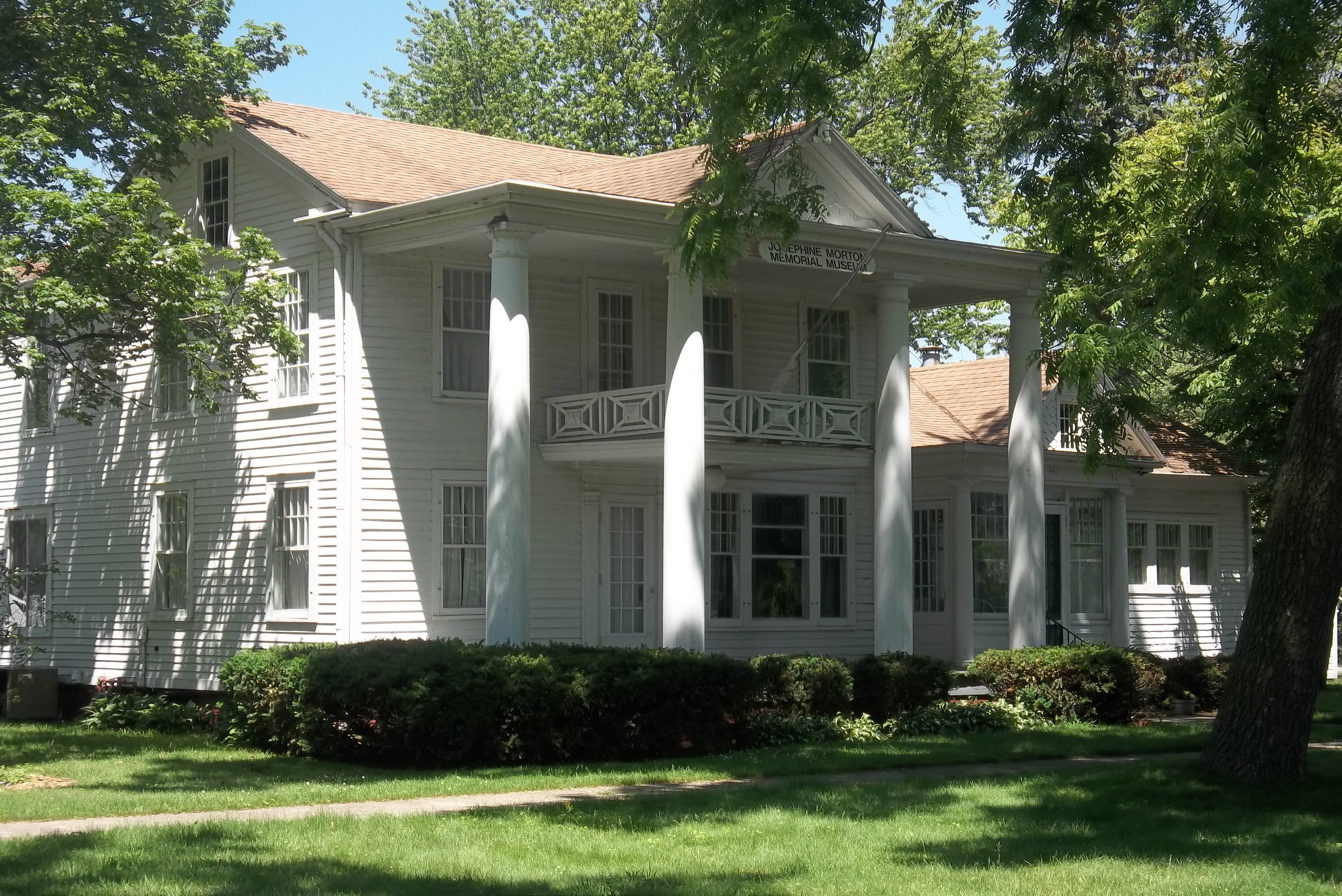
Morton House Museum in Benton Harbor

Sites of interest in Benton Harbor are Shiloh House, built in 1910, which served as the administration building and men's dormitory for the House of David colony, a communal religious group; Morton House (on Morton Hill), built in 1849 by Eleazar Morton, which now houses a museum; nearby is Sarett Nature Center, a 300-acre wildlife sanctuary which offers trails, an interpretative building, and classes; Jean Klock Park on Lake Michigan; and the Golf Club at Harbor Shores. In neighboring Benton Township is the Benton Harbor Fruit Market, which replaced the fruit market in the "flats" area of Benton Harbor, which was torn down during an urban renewal project in 1967.

== Sports ==
An American Basketball Association team (ABA), the Twin City Ballers, played in Benton Harbor for a few games in November 2006, but left the city due to poor attendance at games. Another ABA team, the Lake Michigan Admirals, began play in 2009. The Admirals switched from the ABA to join the Premiere Basketball League for the 2012 season.

Jack Dempsey defended his heavyweight title on September 6, 1920, in Benton Harbor, defeating Billy Miske.

The city hosts the Maytag Ironman 70.3 Steelhead triathlon, a qualifying event for the Ironman 70.3 World Championship.

The city is the birthplace of Iris Kyle, the most successful professional bodybuilder ever, with ten overall Ms. Olympia wins and two heavyweight wins, along with seven Ms. International wins and one heavyweight win.

== Festivals ==
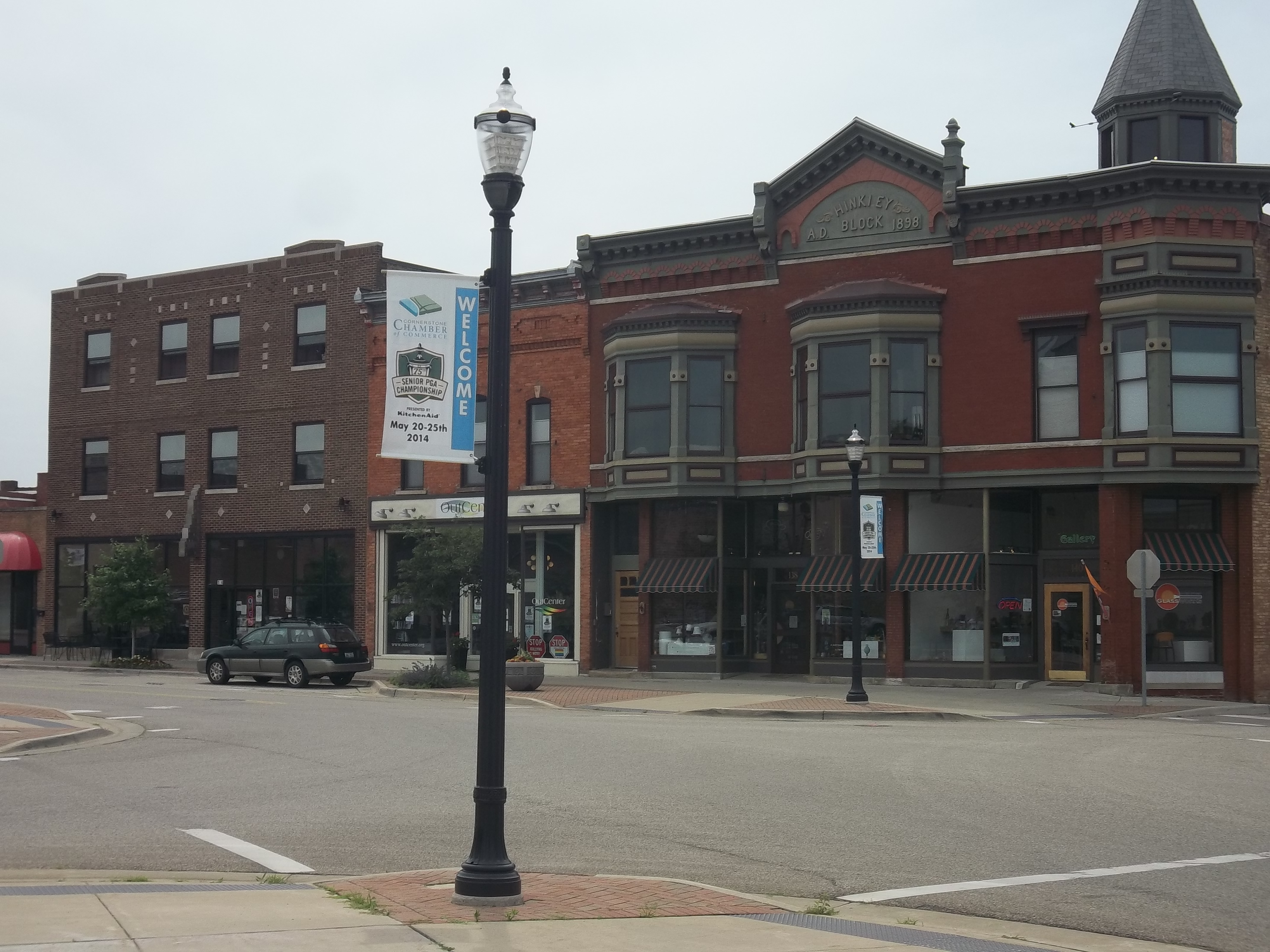
Arts district downtown

Benton Harbor co-hosts the annual Blossomtime Festival with St. Joseph.

== Notable people ==
- Radasłaŭ Astroŭski - Soviet bureaucrat and Nazi collaborator in Belarus
- Vearne C. Babcock – member of the Early Birds of Aviation
- Joique Bell – NFL football player for Detroit Lions
- Bill Berry – jazz trumpeter
- Bobo Brazil – professional wrestler
- Wilson Chandler – NBA player for Philadelphia 76ers
- Mabel Evelyn Elliott – physician and humanitarian who worked in Turkey, Armenia and Greece
- Don Griffin – professional football player
- Gene Harris (Haire) – jazz pianist
- Niki Haris – singer and daughter of Gene Harris
- Clara Edmunds Hemingway – poet, singer, composer, editor
- Don Hopkins – MLB player for Oakland A's
- Ernie Hudson – actor, Ghostbusters
- Arte Johnson – actor and comedian, Laugh-In
- Julie Krone – jockey, first woman to win horse racing's Belmont Stakes
- Iris Kyle – IFBB professional bodybuilder
- Dave Machemer – MLB player and MiLB manager
- Walker "Bud" Mahurin – U.S. Air Force officer
- Jim "Dandy" Mangrum – lead vocalist, Black Oak Arkansas
- Anthony Miller – professional basketball player
- Charles Willard Moore – architect and AIA Gold Medal winner
- Rome (Jerome Woods) – R&B singer
- Sinbad (David Adkins) – actor and comedian
- Ruth Terry – singer and actress
- Robert L. Van Antwerp Jr. – U.S. Army Lieutenant General and Chief of Engineers
- Chet Walker – NBA basketball player for Philadelphia 76ers and Chicago Bulls, 7-time All-Star, 2012 inductee in Basketball Hall of Fame
- Lyman M. Ward – farmer, Union Army brigadier general, and Republican Party politician
- Wally Weber – U-M football player, assistant coach, Hall of Honor inductee
- Robert Whaley – NBA basketball player
