= Jean Klock Park =

Coordinates: 42.1255949°N 86.4716899°W

Jean Klock Park is a historic city park along Lake Michigan in Benton Harbor, Michigan, United States. In 1917, John Nellis Klock and his wife, Carrie, bought a significant stretch of lakeshore including tall dunes and 2,950 feet (900 m) of shoreline from E. K. Warren, donor of Warren Dunes, and deeded the land to the city of Benton Harbor. They gave the land in memory of their daughter, Jean, who died in early childhood. The Klock deed stipulates that the property be used for bathing beach, park purposes, or other public purposes. At the park dedication, Klock stated,

"In taking an inventory of life, we all take stock of the circumstances surrounding the happiest moments. The giving of this park to the city of Benton Harbor has been to Mrs. Klock and myself, the happiest moment of our lives. The deed of this park in the courthouse of St. Joseph will live forever. Perhaps some of you do not own a foot of ground, remember then, that this is your park, it belongs to you. Perhaps some of you have no piano or phonograph, the roll of the water murmuring in calm, roaring in storm, is your music, your piano and music box. The beach is yours, the drive is yours, the dunes are yours, all yours. It is not so much a gift from my wife and myself, it’s a gift from a little child. See to it that the park is the children's.”

The park's center has been converted to three holes of a championship golf course (The Golf Club at Harbor Shores, part of the Harbor Shores development). The course is privately owned with daily usage available to anyone for $150.00 per round. Residents of Benton Harbor can play for about $40.00 per round, as can all residents of Berrien County.

== Development vs. Preservation ==
Jean Klock Park is one of the oldest public parks in the state of Michigan and predates the formation of Michigan's state parks, which occurred in the early 1920s. In 1952 the city of Benton Harbor purchased an adjoining parcel of land along the northern border of the park to be added to the park acreage. Mr. Klock had tried for years with no success to buy it himself, but his death in 1938 and then World War II deferred the long-sought acquisition. The addition extended the beach shoreline by 300 feet (91 m).

In 1990 the city commissioned a master plan for Jean Klock Park, funded by a Coastal Zone Management Program grant, and the report concluded:

"Two general areas comprising the majority of the site are particularly sensitive to human impact. The sand dunes and the wetlands on this property are of a level of quality that they require protection from over-use. Their importance as a resource cannot be overestimated."

The golf course development is extremely controversial. Taking one side of the controversy, the Michigan Messenger (December 21, 2009) stated that the golf course development has severely damaged the natural resource values on the park property.

On the other side of the debate, are advocates for a luxury housing development, which would be centered around an 18-hole championship golf course designed by Jack Nicklaus. They depict the plan as transformative of the entire area surrounding Benton Harbor.

Until recent years, Jean Klock Park was considered untouchable for commercial development. In 1986, the city sought to add the eastern part of Jean Klock Park, excluding the dunes, to a Downtown Development Authority (DDA), but protests from residents who were enraged by the city's disregard for the Klock deed restrictions and community understanding of acceptable uses for the park influenced the Michigan Attorney General's office to issue an opinion that stated that land not contiguous to a city's downtown area could not be incorporated into a DDA.

In 2003, the city announced that, because of financial difficulties, Benton Harbor would sell an under-utilized portion of Jean Klock Park to Grand Boulevard Renaissance, LLC, which intended to construct a residential development on the property. The residents of Benton Harbor filed a lawsuit challenging the city's right to convey the property, asserting that such a conveyance violated the park's deed's covenants and restrictions. The case was settled, and the parties agreed to a consent judgment that allowed the sale of a portion of Jean Klock Park to the private developer in exchange for an injunction against further privatization or conversion of the park. The consent judgment stated that Jean Klock Park shall not be used “for any purpose other than a bathing beach, park purposes, or other public purpose related to bathing beach or park use; provided, however, that there shall be no recreational vehicle park campsites...The restrictions in this paragraph shall run with the land and shall be binding upon the City and its successors.”

In July 2005, the city and Harbor Shores Community Redevelopment Corporation announced that they wished to use a portion of Jean Klock Park for a golf course that would be part of a privately owned mixed-use development consisting of commercial and retail buildings, residences, the golf course, a marina, and other recreational uses. The project would use twenty-two acres of park land for three holes of an 18-hole Jack Nicklaus championship golf course. The city would lease the necessary land to Harbor Shores for a period of up to 105 years.

On July 8, 2008, two plaintiffs in the 2003 litigation filed another lawsuit, claiming that a privately owned and operated golf course violates the previous consent judgement, seeking enforcement of the restrictions in the deed and the consent judgment. The plaintiffs argued that the consent judgment's intent was to require that the Jean Klock Park continue to be used for passive recreational use – the same way it had been used since 1917. Harbor Shores and the city responded with motions citing very expansive uses to which public parks in Michigan have been subjected, including runways and nuclear reactors. A golf course is a park purpose, the judge ruled, or certainly a public purpose related to a park use. The Berrien County Circuit Court further held that, because the city itself is empowered to use the park land as a golf course, the deed and consent judgment are not violated if the city leases the land to another party to do the same thing.

The plaintiffs immediately appealed the circuit court decision. The Appeals Court denied the appeal, affirming the lower court's ruling. A petition to appeal the decision was sent to the Michigan Supreme Court, but was declined.

== Ongoing Litigation ==
Seven other people filed a federal lawsuit against the City of Benton Harbor, the National Park Service, the United States Army Corps of Engineers, and the Advisory Council on Historic Preservation.

Golf course construction on the park site required permits from the Corps of Engineers and the State of Michigan, as well as permission from the National Park Service. The golf course development covers over 500 acres (2.0 km^{2}) and adjoins federally regulated wetlands, two rivers and Lake Michigan, all regulated waters of the United States.

On January 25, 2012, the United States Court of Appeals for the Sixth Circuit in Julie Weiss v. Secretary of the U.S. Department of the Interior (Western District of Michigan), an appeal from Julie Weiss and other concerned citizens to stop the development project, found most of the plaintiffs' claims to be debatable.
