= Bottom Line Inc. =

American publisher

Bottom Line, Inc. (formerly Boardroom, Inc.) is an American publisher of books, newsletters and Web articles that provide advice from experts on a wide variety of topics, predominantly health, health care, investing and personal finance but also food and nutrition, taxes and legal matters, career, privacy and security, home improvement, small business, travel, entertainment, automobiles, technology, personal and family relationships and other topics. It publishes books, print newsletters, Web articles, videos and podcasts, blogs and email-newsletters.

Besides its online content and books, the Stamford, Connecticut-based company publishes the following newsletters in print:

- Bottom Line Personal, the largest-circulation paid consumer newsletter in the U.S., 12 issues per year, covering health, diet and nutrition, investing, personal finance and other consumer topics. As of 2019, it has been continuously published for 38 years.
- Bottom Line Health, 12 issues per year, covering health and health care. As of 2019, it has been continuously published for 32 years.

Bottom Line Personal has approximately 300,000 subscribers at a typical promotional rate of $39 per year. Bottom Line Health has approximately 175,000 subscribers at a typical promotional rate of $29.95 per year. Bottom Line Inc.'s hardcover books include titles such as Bottom Line's Big Book of Pain-Relieving Secrets, Bottom Line's Treasury of Health Secrets for Seniors, The 30-Day Diabetes Cure, Bottom Line's Big Book of Consumer Secrets and others.

Bottom Line's produces expert-sourced content. Although many Bottom Line articles are cast in the first person as if written by the expert source, the vast majority of Bottom Line articles are actually written by professional writers who interview the sources, conduct additional research and write the content. Writer manuscripts are edited by Bottom Line staff editors, reviewed by the expert sources for accuracy, and then fact-checked by Bottom Line fact-checkers. Bottom Line is one of a dwindling number of publishers maintaining fact-checkers on its staff to check the accuracy of content.

The company was founded in New Jersey in 1972 by Martin Edelston, who served as the company's chairman until his death on October 2, 2013. The company moved to Connecticut with Edelston in 1994. The current president is Edelston's daughter, Sarah Hiner, took over as president for a while.

Bottom Line Inc. is a member of the Direct Marketing Association and is a prolific sender of advertising mail. An aspect of Bottom Line's book marketing has caused contention: the industry practice known as negative option billing. Contentious cases around negative option billing often center on unwitting solicitation lost in fine print and the difficulty of reversing a solicitation once made. Bottom Line Books have received approximately 75 billing complaints arbitrated by the Stamford, Connecticut Better Business Bureau.
