= The Golf Club at Harbor Shores =

Golf club

- Interactive map of The Golf Club at Harbor Shores
- 42.1227°N 86.4606°W

Club information
- Location: Benton Harbor, Michigan; United States
- Established: 2010
- Type: Resort
- Operator: Josh Doxtator, PGA General Manager
- Total holes: 18
- Website: www.harborshoresgolf.com
- Designed by: Jack Nicklaus
- Par: 71
- Length: 6,734 yards
- Course rating: 73.6
- Slope rating: 146

The Golf Club at Harbor Shores is a golf club located in Benton Harbor, Michigan, part of the Harbor Shores development on Lake Michigan.

== History ==
The 18 hole course opened on July 1, 2010. The course held its Grand Opening on July 10, 2010, with Johnny Miller, Arnold Palmer, Tom Watson, and its designer, Jack Nicklaus, in attendance.

A Colin Montgomerie-designed "Wee Course" opened in 2026.

== Controversy ==
Local residents took exception to the golf course using a portion of the public Jean Klock Park for three of its holes. The Michigan Supreme Court ruled in favor of Harbor Shores to keep the three holes.

== Tournaments ==
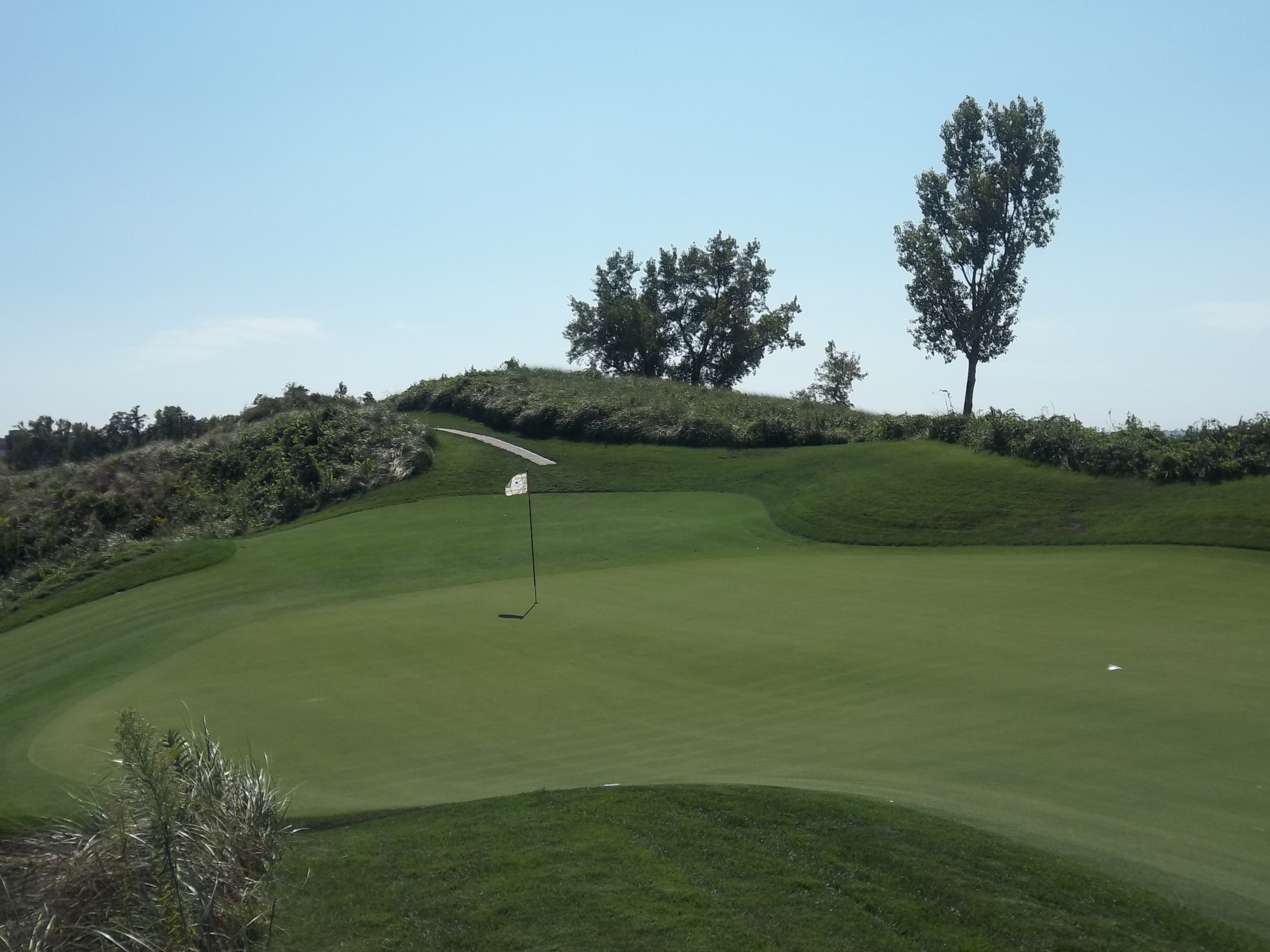
Hole no. 7 at Harbor Shores

Harbor Shores hosted or had planned to host the Senior PGA Championship every other year between 2012 and 2024.

== Course ==
The golf course has four distinct sections, as noted on the scorecard. The first six holes are inland holes; holes 7, 8, and 9 play through dunes, as they are the closest holes to Lake Michigan. The first four holes on the back nine are woodlands holes; and holes 14-18 are river holes, playing on or near the Paw Paw River.

The Golf Club at Harbor Shores
Tee	Rating/Slope	1	2	3	4	5	6	7	8	9	Out	10	11	12	13	14	15	16	17	18	In	Total
Black	73.6 / 146	420	169	318	201	566	420	430	381	560	3465	530	137	409	192	438	537	418	190	418	3269	6734
Black/Gold	72.2 / 142	420	141	318	158	530	420	396	381	560	3324	530	137	378	167	408	537	380	190	418	3145	6469
Gold	70.9 / 139	385	141	305	158	530	389	396	364	530	3198	475	122	378	167	408	487	380	154	390	2961	6159
Gold/White	69.6 / 135	369	117	305	158	530	364	295	364	522	3024	475	122	364	167	394	487	352	137	390	2888	5912
White	67.9 / 131	369	117	288	132	512	364	295	337	522	2936	423	109	364	154	394	446	352	137	331	2710	5646
SI	Men's	11	17	15	5	7	1	3	9	13		12	18	10	16	2	8	4	14	6
Par		4	3	4	3	5	4	4	4	5	36	5	3	4	3	4	5	4	3	4	35	71
White/Blue	71.3 / 135	307	117	288	109	444	296	295	337	460	2653	423	109	315	154	349	446	290	137	331	2554	5207
Blue	69.3 / 127	307	93	251	109	444	296	276	272	460	2508	389	89	315	126	349	392	290	108	276	2334	4842
SI	Women's	13	17	9	15	3	1	7	11	5		8	14	12	16	4	2	6	18	10
