= Southwest Michigan Regional Airport =

Airport in Benton Harbor, Michigan

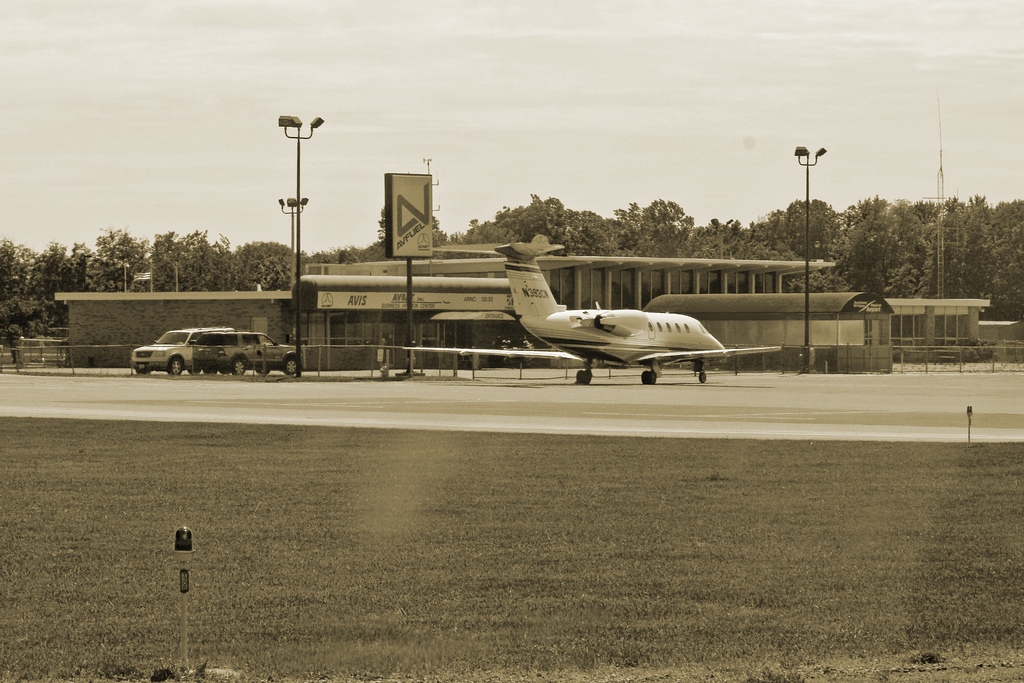
- Airport of Benton Harbor
- IATA: BEH; ICAO: KBEH; FAA LID: BEH

Summary
- Airport type: Public
- Owner: Benton Harbor / St. Joseph
- Serves: Benton Harbor, Michigan / St. Joseph, Michigan
- Elevation AMSL: 649 ft / 198 m
- Coordinates: 42°07′43″N 086°25′34″W
- Website: www.swmiairport.com

Map
- Location of airport in Michigan BEH (the United States)

Runways
Direction	Length		Surface
Direction	ft	m	Surface
10/28	6,005	1,830	Asphalt
14/32	3,661	1,116	Asphalt

Statistics (2010)
- Aircraft operations: 18,250
- Based aircraft: 59
- Source: Federal Aviation Administration

Southwest Michigan Regional Airport (IATA: BEH, ICAO: KBEH, FAA LID: BEH) is a public use airport located two nautical miles (4 km) northeast of the central business district of Benton Harbor, a city in Berrien County, Michigan, United States. The airport is owned by the cities of Benton Harbor and St. Joseph, Michigan. It is included in the Federal Aviation Administration (FAA) National Plan of Integrated Airport Systems for 2017–2021, in which it is categorized as a regional general aviation facility.

The airport was named "Twin Cities Airport Ross Field" until mid-April 1993, when it was renamed with its current name; the "Ross Field" label was retained within the facility.

== Facilities and aircraft ==
Southwest Michigan Regional Airport covers an area of 485 acres (196 ha) at an elevation of 649 feet (198 m) above mean sea level. It has two asphalt paved runways: 10/28 is 6,005 by 100 feet (1,830 x 30 m); 14/32 is 3,661 by 100 feet (1,116 x 30 m)

For the 12-month period ending December 31, 2021, the airport had 18,250 aircraft operations, an average of 50 per day: 94% general aviation, 5% air taxi, and <1% military. At that time there were 59 aircraft based at this airport: 47 single-engine and 5 multi-engine airplanes as well as 7 jets.

The airport is accessible by road from Territorial Road, and is close to Interstate 94 and I-94 Business Loop.

The airport is staffed as follows:

- Monday through Friday, May through October - 8AM to 7PM
- Monday through Friday, November through April - 8AM to 4PM
- Saturday, year round - 8AM to 4PM

=== Control tower ===
Originally opened in 1973, the air traffic control tower was abandoned after a 1981 controller strike. It ceased operation and never re-opened. The air traffic control tower was demolished in the fall of 2013.

== Air service ==
There is currently no commercial airline with scheduled passenger service at the airport. From 1960 to 2000, the airport was predominantly serviced by airlines including North Central Airlines, Republic Airlines (1979–1986), Mississippi Valley Airlines, Air Wisconsin Airlines, Iowa Airways and Mesaba Airlines. Today, the airport is used primarily by general aviation and corporate clients.

It was most recently serviced from 1995 to 2000 by Mesaba Airlines, offering five daily flights to the Northwest Airlines hub at Detroit. But despite an intense local marketing campaign (utilizing the slogan You Can Get There From Here), the proximity of airports in Chicago, Kalamazoo, Grand Rapids, and South Bend siphoned business from BEH and service was discontinued.

It is also currently the home of the Wolverine Composite Squadron of the Michigan Wing Civil Air Patrol.

== Accidents and incidents ==
- On February 3, 1992, a Beech 95-BE55 Baron crashed in Benton Harbor for undetermined reasons.
- On August 2, 2002, a Piper PA-46 impacted terrain on the extended centerline during a forced landing at Benton Harbor following a complete loss of engine power in cruise. The aircraft was substantially damaged, and the pilot and two passengers were fatally injured. The probable cause was found to be the pilot's failure to maintain airspeed above stall speed resulting in a stall/spin.
- On October 2, 2013, a Piper Pa-28 Cherokee crashed during startup procedures. The pilot applied full throttle and lost control of the plane, subsequently impacting a hangar. A ground worker was injured. The probable cause was found to be the pilot's failure to maintain aircraft control during engine start.
- On November 26, 2025, a replica of a Piper PA-12 flipped while attempting an emergency landing.

== See also ==
- List of airports in Michigan
