= Benton Charter Township, Michigan =

- Charter township
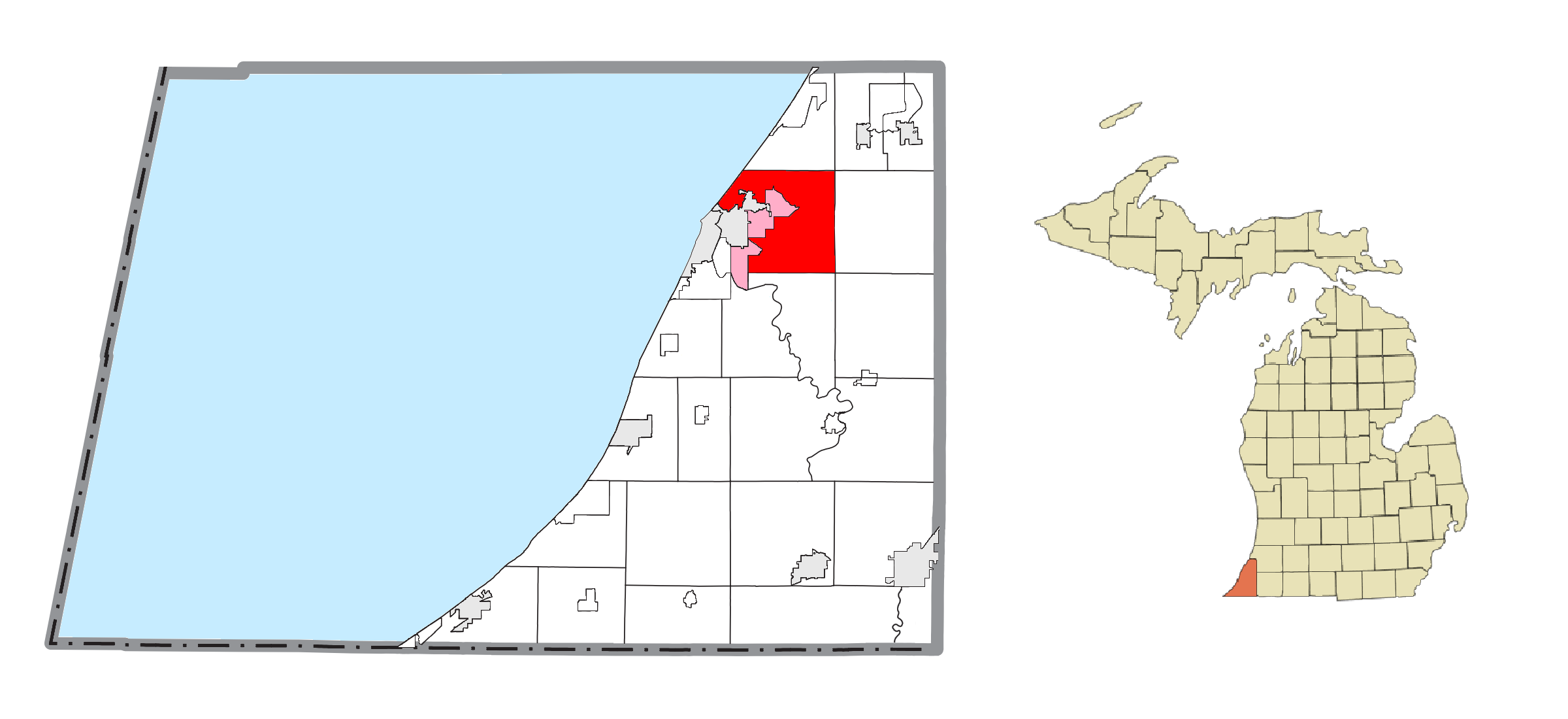
- Location within Berrien County (red) and the administered communities of Benton Heights and Fair Plain (pink)

- Location within the state of Michigan
- Coordinates: 42°06′37″N 86°24′58″W
- Country: United States
- State: Michigan
- County: Berrien

Area
  - Total: 32.8 sq mi (85.0 km^{2})
  - Land: 32.4 sq mi (83.8 km^{2})
  - Water: 0.46 sq mi (1.2 km^{2})
- Elevation: 633 ft (193 m)

Population (2020)
  - Total: 14,374
  - Density: 444/sq mi (172/km^{2})
- Time zone: UTC-5 (Eastern (EST))
  - Summer (DST): UTC-4 (EDT)
- ZIP code(s): 49022, 49126
- Area code: 269
- FIPS code: 26-07400
- GNIS feature ID: 1625918
- Website: Official website

Benton Charter Township is a charter township of Berrien County in the U.S. state of Michigan. As of the 2020 census, the population was 14,374.

== Communities ==
- Benton Heights is an unincorporated community and census-designated place in the west-center of the township, adjacent to Benton Harbor.
- Fair Plain is an unincorporated community and census-designated place in the southwest part of the township, extending west into St. Joseph Charter Township.
- Millburg is an unincorporated community and a census-designated place in the eastern part of the township near the boundary with Bainbridge Township.

== History ==
The township was established on March 11, 1837, and was named after Thomas Hart Benton, U.S. senator from Missouri. It remained attached to St. Joseph Township for administrative purposes until 1841.

The commune of the House of David was located in the township.

In 1967, the Benton Harbor Fruit Market, established in 1860 in Benton Harbor, moved to the township. The Benton Harbor city limits have since then extended to include the market.

== Geography ==
According to the United States Census Bureau, the township has a total area of 32.8 square miles (85.0 km^{2}), of which 32.4 square miles (83.8 km^{2}) is land and 0.46 square miles (1.2 km^{2}), or 1.36%, is water.

The township is in the northwest portion of the county, with Lake Michigan to the west in the north of the township and Benton Harbor to the west in the south of the township. St. Joseph and St. Joseph Charter Township lie to the southwest. Hagar Township is to the north, Coloma Charter Township to the northeast, Bainbridge Township is to the east, Pipestone Township is to the southeast, and Sodus Township and Royalton Township are to the south.

I-94 traverses the township diagonally from northeast to southwest. The southern terminus of I-196 is at the junction with I-94. US 31 follows parts of I-196, I-94, Napier Avenue, and all of the completed portion of the St. Joseph Valley Parkway within the township. M-139 lies in the southwest of the township and runs from I-94 to a junction with Business Loop I-94 just east of Benton Harbor (the southbound direction begins on the Benton Harbor–Benton Township border).

== Demographics ==
Benton charter township, Berrien County, Michigan – Racial and ethnic composition Note: the US Census treats Hispanic/Latino as an ethnic category. This table excludes Latinos from the racial categories and assigns them to a separate category. Hispanics/Latinos may be of any race.
Race / Ethnicity (NH = Non-Hispanic)	Pop 2000	Pop 2010	Pop 2020	% 2000	% 2010	% 2020
White alone (NH)	6,989	5,858	5,490	42.61%	39.72%	38.19%
Black or African American alone (NH)	8,478	7,566	6,789	51.68%	51.30%	47.23%
Native American or Alaska Native alone (NH)	61	71	60	0.37%	0.48%	0.42%
Asian alone (NH)	57	47	59	0.35%	0.32%	0.41%
Native Hawaiian or Pacific Islander alone (NH)	2	0	6	0.01%	0.00%	0.04%
Other race alone (NH)	33	12	64	0.20%	0.08%	0.45%
Mixed race or Multiracial (NH)	269	313	672	1.64%	2.12%	4.68%
Hispanic or Latino (any race)	515	882	1,234	3.14%	5.98%	8.58%
Total	16,404	14,749	14,374	100.00%	100.00%	100.00%

=== 2000 Census ===
At the 2000 census, there were 16,404 people, 6,485 households and 4,221 families residing in the township. The population density was 503.6 inhabitants per square mile (194.4/km^{2}). There were 7,082 housing units at an average density of 217.4 per square mile (83.9/km^{2}). The racial makeup of the township was 44.11% White, 51.86% African American, 0.37% Native American, 0.36% Asian, 0.01% Pacific Islander, 1.48% from other races, and 1.82% from two or more races. Hispanic or Latino of any race were 3.14% of the population.

There were 6,485 households, of which 32.6% had children under the age of 18 living with them, 35.9% were married couples living together, 24.3% had a female householder with no husband present, and 34.9% were non-families. 29.6% of all households were made up of individuals, and 11.4% had someone living alone who was 65 years of age or older. The average household size was 2.49 and the average family size was 3.05.

Age distribution was 30.0% under the age of 18, 8.9% from 18 to 24, 26.8% from 25 to 44, 20.8% from 45 to 64, and 13.4% who were 65 years of age or older. The median age was 33 years. For every 100 females, there were 88.9 males. For every 100 females age 18 and over, there were 81.8 males.

The median household income was $25,942, and the median family income was $30,899. Males had a median income of $31,563 versus $20,484 for females. The per capita income for the township was $14,137. About 22.5% of families and 27.7% of the population were below the poverty line, including 42.3% of those under age 18 and 16.6% of those age 65 or over.

== Economy ==
Whirlpool Corporation has its headquarters in the township. Whirlpool employs a total of 2,058 employees in the metropolitan area.

== Education ==
Benton Charter Township is served by the Benton Harbor Public Library located within the Benton Harbor city limits.

== Sports and recreation ==
Point O'Woods Golf & Country Club is located in the township, just northwest of Millburg.

Sarett Nature Center, a 300-acre (1.2 km^{2}) wildlife sanctuary which offers trails, an interpretative building, and classes, is located in the northern portion of the township. It is named for Lew R. Sarett, father of Lewis Hastings Sarett.
