= Benton Harbor Public Library =

Public library in Benton Harbor, Michigan, USA

- 42.1158°N 86.4531°W
- Location: Benton Harbor, Michigan, United States
- Established: 1898

Other information
- Website: www.bentonharborlibrary.com

The Benton Harbor Public Library (BHPL) is a public library located in Benton Harbor, Michigan. The BHPL service area consists of the City of Benton Harbor and Benton Charter Township, Michigan.

The library has an extensive reference department and book collection; an auditorium for group activities; and offers free wireless internet access.

BHPL is a member of the Southwestern Michigan Library Cooperative. BHPL also participates in the statewide MILibrary library card program.

== See also ==
- Benton Harbor, Michigan
- Benton Charter Township, Michigan
