= Senior PGA Championship =

Golf tournament in the United States for men 50 and over

Tournament information
- Location: Bradenton, Florida
- Established: 1937
- Course: The Concession Golf Club
- Par: 72
- Length: 7,022 yards (6,421 m)
- Tours: PGA Tour Champions; European Senior Tour
- Format: Stroke play
- Prize fund: $3,000,000
- Month played: May

Tournament record score
- Aggregate: 265 Rocco Mediate (2016); 265 Paul Broadhurst (2018)
- To par: −20 Sam Snead (1973)

Current champion
- (United States) Stewart Cink

Final champion
- Location in the United States Location in Florida

The Senior PGA Championship, established in 1937, is the oldest of the five major championships in men's senior golf. It is administered by the Professional Golfers' Association of America and is recognized as a major championship by both PGA Tour Champions and the European Senior Tour. It was formerly an unofficial money event on the European Senior Tour, but since 2007 has been an official money event. Winners gain entry into the next PGA Championship. The winners prior to 1980, the first season of the senior tour, are not considered major champions of this event by the PGA Tour Champions.

The lower age limit is 50, which is the standard limit for men's senior professional golf tournaments. Like its PGA Tour counterpart, the Senior PGA Championship allows club professionals to enter. The tournament committee gives former winners of the PGA Professional National Championship a one time invitation upon turning 50 years of age and the top 35 club professionals who qualify through the Senior PGA Professional National Championship.

== History ==
The inaugural event was played 89 years ago in 1937 at Augusta National Golf Club, with 54-year-old Jock Hutchison winning the 54-hole event on Thursday, December 2. The second edition at Augusta was reduced to 36 holes due to rain, but had an 18-hole playoff on December 9 to decide the winner, Fred McLeod. The next edition was moved to Florida in January, No tournaments were held in 1943 and 1944 due to World War II. The event returned in 1945 at the PGA National Golf Course, where it stayed until 1962. The event moved to different courses in Florida through 2000. Due to scheduling moves, two tournaments were played in 1979 and 1984 and none in 1983, and 1985. It moved from winter to mid-April in 1990 and when it rotated to various sites in 2001, it became a late spring event, played in late May or early June.

It was a 36-hole event until 1954; after four years at 54 holes, it became a 72-hole event in 1958. In the past, the event has had long spells of playing on a single host course, but currently it is played on a different course each year.

In 2011, the PGA of America and Whirlpool Corporation commenced an agreement which designated the KitchenAid brand as official home appliance brand of the PGA and presenting sponsor of the Senior PGA Championship. Harbor Shores Golf Club in Benton Harbor, Michigan, was designated as the championship's home course, hosting in alternate years starting in 2012. The Championship was canceled in 2020 due to the COVID-19 pandemic. In 2014, the Whirlpool extended their arrangement through 2018, with KitchenAid becoming the title sponsor of the event. A further extension through 2024 was agreed in 2018, which proved to be the last.

== Eligibility ==
The following may be eligible to compete in the Senior PGA Championship (provided they meet the age requirement):

- Any past winner of the Senior PGA Championship
- Any past winner of a regular major championship
- Any past member of the United States Ryder Cup team
- The top 15 finishers in the previous year's Senior PGA Championship
- The top 50 on the PGA Tour Champions money list (previous year and current year)
- Any winner of a PGA Tour Champions event since the last Senior PGA Championship
- The top 35 finishers from the Callaway Golf Senior PGA Professional National Championship
- Any winner of the previous five U.S. Senior Opens
- The winner of the previous five Senior Open Championship
- The top eight players from the previous year's European Senior Tour Order of Merit
- The top four players from the previous year's Japanese Seniors Tour Order of Merit
- A one-time exemption for those who have just turned 50 and have won a PGA Tour, Japan Golf Tour, or European Tour event in the last 5 years
- The top 30 on the career money list, both PGA Tour Champions and combined PGA Tour Champions and PGA Tour
- A one-time exemption for former PGA Professional National Champions turning 50
- Invitations for those not meeting criteria above also are made

== Tournament hosts ==
Year	Venue	Location
2026	The Concession Golf Club	Bradenton, Florida
2025	Congressional Country Club	Bethesda, Maryland
2012, 2014, 2016, 2018, 2022, 2024	The Golf Club at Harbor Shores	Benton Harbor, Michigan
2023	PGA Frisco, Fields Ranch East	Frisco, Texas
2021	Southern Hills Country Club	Tulsa, Oklahoma
2008, 2019	Oak Hill Country Club	Rochester, New York
2017	Trump National Golf Club	Potomac Falls, Virginia
2015	French Lick Resort	French Lick, Indiana
2013	Bellerive Country Club	St. Louis, Missouri
2004, 2011	Valhalla Golf Club	Louisville, Kentucky
2010	Colorado Golf Club	Parker, Colorado
2009	Canterbury Golf Club	Beachwood, Ohio
2007	Kiawah Island Golf Resort, Ocean Course	Kiawah Island, South Carolina
2006	Oak Tree Golf Club	Edmond, Oklahoma
2005	Laurel Valley Golf Club	Ligonier, Pennsylvania
2003	Aronimink Golf Club	Newtown Square, Pennsylvania
2002	Firestone Country Club	Akron, Ohio
2001	The Ridgewood Country Club	Paramus, New Jersey
1982–2000	PGA National Golf Club	Palm Beach Gardens, Florida
1979 (Dec.) −1981	Turnberry Isle Country Club	North Miami Beach, Florida
1975–1979 (Feb.)	Walt Disney World	Orlando, Florida
1974	Port St. Lucie Country Club	Port St. Lucie, Florida
1964, 1966–1973	PGA National Golf Club (old)	Palm Beach Gardens, Florida
1965	Fort Lauderdale Country Club	Fort Lauderdale, Florida
1963	Port St. Lucie Country Club	Port St. Lucie, Florida
1945–1962	PGA National Golf Course	Dunedin, Florida
1942	Fort Myers Country Club	Fort Myers, Florida
1940–41	Bobby Jones Golf Complex; Sarasota Bay Country Club	Sarasota, Florida
1937–38 (Dec.)	Augusta National Golf Club	Augusta, Georgia

== Winners ==
Year	Winner	Score	To par	Margin of victory	Runner(s)-up	Winner's share ($)	Venue
Senior PGA Championship
2026	(United States) Stewart Cink	269	−19	6 strokes	(United States) Ben Crane	540,000	The Concession Golf Club
2025	(Argentina) Ángel Cabrera	280	−8	1 stroke	(Denmark) Thomas Bjørn (Republic of Ireland) Pádraig Harrington	540,000	Congressional
KitchenAid Senior PGA Championship
2024	(England) Richard Bland	267	−17	3 strokes	(Australia) Richard Green	630,000	Harbor Shores
2023	(United States) Steve Stricker	270	−18	Playoff	(Republic of Ireland) Pádraig Harrington	630,000	PGA Frisco
2022	(New Zealand) Steven Alker	268	−16	3 strokes	(Canada) Stephen Ames	585,000	Harbor Shores
2021	(Germany) Alex Čejka	272	−8	4 strokes	(United States) Tim Petrovic	585,000	Southern Hills
2020	Canceled due to the COVID-19 pandemic						
2019	(United States) Ken Tanigawa	277	−3	1 stroke	(United States) Scott McCarron	585,000	Oak Hill
2018	(England) Paul Broadhurst	265	−19	4 strokes	(United States) Tim Petrovic	585,000	Harbor Shores
2017	(Germany) Bernhard Langer	270	−18	1 stroke	(Fiji) Vijay Singh	540,000	Trump National
Senior PGA Championship
2016	(United States) Rocco Mediate	265	−19	3 strokes	(Scotland) Colin Montgomerie	504,000	Harbor Shores
2015	(Scotland) Colin Montgomerie (2)	280	−8	4 strokes	(Mexico) Esteban Toledo	495,000	French Lick Resort
2014	(Scotland) Colin Montgomerie	271	−13	4 strokes	(United States) Tom Watson	378,000	Harbor Shores
2013	(Japan) Kōki Idoki	273	−11	2 strokes	(United States) Jay Haas (United States) Kenny Perry	378,000	Bellerive
2012	(England) Roger Chapman	271	−13	2 strokes	(United States) John Cook	378,000	Harbor Shores
2011	(United States) Tom Watson (2)	278	−10	Playoff	(United States) David Eger	378,000	Valhalla
2010	(United States) Tom Lehman	281	−7	Playoff	(United States) Fred Couples (South Africa) David Frost	360,000	Colorado
2009	(United States) Michael Allen	274	−6	2 strokes	(United States) Larry Mize	360,000	Canterbury
2008	(United States) Jay Haas (2)	287	+7	1 stroke	(Germany) Bernhard Langer	360,000	Oak Hill
2007	(Zimbabwe) Denis Watson	279	−9	2 strokes	(Argentina) Eduardo Romero	360,000	Kiawah Island
2006	(United States) Jay Haas	279	−5	Playoff	(United States) Brad Bryant	360,000	Oak Tree
2005	(United States) Mike Reid	280	−8	Playoff	(United States) Jerry Pate (United States) Dana Quigley	360,000	Laurel Valley
2004	(United States) Hale Irwin (4)	276	−8	1 stroke	(United States) Jay Haas	360,000	Valhalla
2003	(United States) John Jacobs	276	−4	2 strokes	(United States) Bobby Wadkins	360,000	Aronimink
2002	(United States) Fuzzy Zoeller	278	−2	1 stroke	(United States) Hale Irwin (United States) Bobby Wadkins	360,000	Firestone
2001	(United States) Tom Watson	274	−14	1 stroke	(United States) Jim Thorpe	360,000	The Ridgewood
PGA Seniors' Championship
2000	(United States) Doug Tewell	201 (Note: Shortened to 54 holes due to rain.)	−15	7 strokes	(United States) Hale Irwin (United States) Tom Kite (United States) Larry Nelson (United States) Dana Quigley	324,000	PGA National
1999	(United States) Allen Doyle	274	−14	2 strokes	(Argentina) Vicente Fernández	315,000	PGA National
1998	(United States) Hale Irwin (3)	275	−13	6 strokes	(United States) Larry Nelson	270,000	PGA National
1997	(United States) Hale Irwin (2)	274	−14	12 strokes	(United States) Dale Douglass (United States) Jack Nicklaus	216,000	PGA National
1996	(United States) Hale Irwin	280	−8	2 strokes	(Japan) Isao Aoki	198,000	PGA National
1995	(United States) Raymond Floyd	277	−11	5 strokes	(United States) John Paul Cain (United States) Larry Gilbert (United States) Lee Trevino	180,000	PGA National
1994	(United States) Lee Trevino (2)	279	−9	1 stroke	(United States) Jim Colbert	115,000	PGA National
1993	(United States) Tom Wargo	275	−13	Playoff	(Australia) Bruce Crampton	110,000	PGA National
1992	(United States) Lee Trevino	278	−10	1 stroke	(United States) Mike Hill	100,000	PGA National
1991	(United States) Jack Nicklaus	271	−17	6 strokes	(Australia) Bruce Crampton	85,000	PGA National
1990	(South Africa) Gary Player (3)	281	−7	2 strokes	(United States) Chi-Chi Rodríguez	75,000	PGA National
General Foods PGA Seniors' Championship
1989	(United States) Larry Mowry	281	−7	1 stroke	(United States) Miller Barber (United States) Al Geiberger	72,000	PGA National
1988	(South Africa) Gary Player (2)	284	−4	3 strokes	(United States) Chi-Chi Rodríguez	63,000	PGA National
1987	(United States) Chi-Chi Rodríguez	282	−6	1 stroke	(United States) Dale Douglass	47,000	PGA National
1986 (Feb)	(South Africa) Gary Player	281	−7	2 strokes	(United States) Lee Elder	45,000	PGA National
1985: No tournament
1984 (Dec)	(Australia) Peter Thomson	286	−2	3 strokes	(United States) Don January	40,000	PGA National
PGA Seniors' Championship
1984 (Jan)	(United States) Arnold Palmer (2)	282	−6	2 strokes	(United States) Don January	35,000	PGA National
1983: No tournament
1982 (Dec)	(United States) Don January (2)	288	E	1 stroke	(United States) Julius Boros	25,000	PGA National
1981	(United States) Miller Barber	281	−7	2 strokes	(United States) Arnold Palmer	20,000	Turnberry Isle
1980	(United States) Arnold Palmer	289	+1	Playoff	(United States) Paul Harney	20,000	Turnberry Isle
1979 (Dec)	(United States) Don January	270	−18	8 strokes	(United States) George Bayer	15,000	Turnberry Isle
1979 (Feb)	(United States) Jack Fleck	289	+1	Playoff	(United States) Bob Erickson (United States) Bill Johnston	8,000	Walt Disney World
1978	(United States) Joe Jimenez	286	−2	Playoff	(United States) Joe Cheves (United States) Manuel de la Torre	8,000	Walt Disney World
1977	(United States) Julius Boros (2)	283	−5	1 stroke	(United States) Fred Haas	7,500	Walt Disney World
1976	(United States) Pete Cooper	283	−5	5 strokes	(United States) Fred Wampler	7,500	Walt Disney World
1975	(United States) Charlie Sifford	280	−8	Playoff	(United States) Fred Wampler	7,500	Walt Disney World
1974	(Argentina) Roberto De Vicenzo	273	−15	3 strokes	(United States) Julius Boros (United States) Art Wall	4,000	Port St. Lucie
1973	(United States) Sam Snead (6)	268	−20	15 strokes	(United States) Julius Boros	4,000	PGA National
1972	(United States) Sam Snead (5)	286	−2	1 stroke	(United States) Julius Boros	4,000	PGA National
1971	(United States) Julius Boros	285	−3	3 strokes	(United States) Tommy Bolt	4,000	PGA National
1970	(United States) Sam Snead (4)	290	+2	2 strokes	(United States) Fred Haas	4,000	PGA National
1969	(United States) Tommy Bolt	278	−10			4,000	PGA National
1968	(United States) Chandler Harper	279	−9			4,000	PGA National
1967	(United States) Sam Snead (3)	279	−9			4,000	PGA National
1966	(United States) Fred Haas	286	−2			3,000	PGA National
1965	(United States) Sam Snead (2)	278	−10			3,500	Fort Lauderdale
1964	(United States) Sam Snead	279	−9			2,500	PGA National
1963	(United States) Herman Barron	272	−16			2,500	Port St. Lucie
1962	(United States) Paul Runyan (2)	278	−10			2,000	PGA National
1961	(United States) Paul Runyan	278	−10			1,500	PGA National
1960	(United States) Dick Metz	284	−4			1,500	PGA National
1959	(United States) Willie Goggin	284	−4			1,200	PGA National
1958	(United States) Gene Sarazen (2)	288	E			1,200	PGA National
1957	(United States) Al Watrous (3)	210	−6			1,000	PGA National
1956	(United States) Pete Burke	215	−1			1,000	PGA National
1955	(United States) Mortie Dutra	213	−3			1,000	PGA National
1954	(United States) Gene Sarazen	214	−2			1,000	PGA National
1953	(United States) Harry Schwab	142	−2				PGA National
1952	(United States) Ernie Newnham	146	+2				PGA National
1951	(United States) Al Watrous (2)	142	−2				PGA National
1950	(United States) Al Watrous	142	−2				PGA National
1949	(United States) Marshall Crichton	145	+1				PGA National
1948	(United States) Charles McKenna	141	−3				PGA National
1947	(United States) Jock Hutchison (2)	145	+1				PGA National
1946	(United States) Eddie Williams (3)	146	+2				PGA National
1945	(United States) Eddie Williams (2)	148	+4				PGA National
1943–44: No tournament due to World War II
1942	(United States) Eddie Williams	138	−6				Fort Myers
1941	(United States) Jack Burke Sr.	142	E				Bobby Jones Golf Complex; Sarasota Bay
1940	(United States) Otto Hackbarth	146	+4				Bobby Jones Golf Complex; Sarasota Bay
1939: No tournament
1938	(Scotland) Fred McLeod	154	+10				Augusta National
1937	(United States) Jock Hutchison	223	+7				Augusta National

== Multiple winners ==
The following men have won the Senior PGA Championship more than once, through 2021:

- 6 wins: Sam Snead (1964, 1965, 1967, 1970, 1972, 1973)
- 4 wins: Hale Irwin (1996, 1997, 1998, 2004)
- 3 wins: Eddie Williams (1942, 1945, 1946), Al Watrous (1950, 1951, 1957), Gary Player (1986, 1988, 1990)
- 2 wins: Jock Hutchison (1937, 1947), Gene Sarazen (1954, 1958), Paul Runyan (1961, 1962), Julius Boros (1971, 1977), Don January (1979, 1982), Arnold Palmer (1980, 1984), Lee Trevino (1992, 1994), Jay Haas (2006, 2008), Tom Watson (2001, 2011), Colin Montgomerie (2014, 2015)

== Winners of both PGA Championship and Senior PGA Championship ==
The following men have won both the PGA Championship and the Senior PGA Championship, the majors run by the PGA of America:

Player	PGA Championship	Senior PGA Championship
Jock Hutchison	1920	1937, 1947
Gene Sarazen	1922, 1923, 1933	1954, 1958
Paul Runyan	1934, 1938	1961, 1962
Sam Snead	1942, 1949, 1951	1964, 1965, 1967, 1970, 1972, 1973
Chandler Harper	1950	1968
Julius Boros	1968	1971, 1977
Don January	1967	1979, 1982
Gary Player	1962, 1972	1986, 1988, 1990
Jack Nicklaus	1963, 1971, 1973, 1975, 1980	1991
Lee Trevino	1974, 1984	1992, 1994
Raymond Floyd	1969, 1982	1995

== Future Sites ==
Year	Host site	City	Dates
2027	The Concession Golf Club	Bradenton, Florida	TBD
2028	The Concession Golf Club	Bradenton, Florida	TBD
2029	Fields Ranch East at PGA Frisco	Frisco, Texas	TBD
2030	TBD	TBD	TBD
2031	TBD	TBD	TBD
2032	TBD	TBD	TBD
2033	Congressional Country Club	Bethesda, Maryland	TBD

== See also ==
- Golf in the United States
