= 2019 Senior Open Championship =

Tournament information
- Dates: 25–28 July 2019
- Location: Lytham, England; 53.7496°N 3.0178°W
- Course: Royal Lytham & St Annes Golf Club
- Organised by: The R&A
- Tours: European Senior Tour; PGA Tour Champions
- Format: 72 holes stroke play

Statistics
- Par: 70
- Length: 6,948 yd (6,353 m)
- Field: 144 players, 79 after cut
- Cut: 145 (+5)
- Prize fund: US$2,000,000

Champion
- (Germany) Bernhard Langer
- 274 (−6)

Location map
- Location in the United Kingdom Location in England Location in the Borough of Fylde Location in Lytham St Annes

The 2019 Senior Open Championship was a senior major golf championship and the 33rd Senior Open Championship, held on 25–28 July at Royal Lytham & St Annes Golf Club in Lytham, England. It was the 5th Senior Open Championship played at the course and the 17th Senior Open Championship played as a senior major championship.

World Golf Hall of Fame member Bernhard Langer won by two strokes over Paul Broadhurst. The 2019 event was Langer's fourth Senior Open Championship title and his 11th senior major championship victory.

== Venue ==
The 2019 event was the fifth Senior Open Championship played at Royal Lytham & St Annes Golf Club.

=== Course layout ===
Hole	Yards	Par	Hole	Yards	Par
1	198	3	10	385	4
2	455	4	11	540	5
3	477	4	12	196	3
4	416	4	13	357	4
5	188	3	14	443	4
6	474	4	15	464	4
7	589	5	16	343	4
8	417	4	17	432	4
9	164	3	18	410	4
Out	3,378	34	In	3,570	36
Source:		Total		6,948	70

== Field ==
The field of 144 competitors included 136 professionals and 8 amateurs. An 18-hole stroke play qualifying round was held on Monday, 22 July for players who were not already exempt.

=== Past champions in the field ===
==== Made the cut ====
Player	Country	Year(s) won	R1	R2	R3	R4	Total	To par	Finish
Bernhard Langer	Germany	2010, 2014, 2017	71	67	70	66	274	−6	1
Paul Broadhurst	England	2016	67	71	67	71	276	−4	2
Miguel Ángel Jiménez	Spain	2018	71	68	74	67	280	E	T10
Fred Couples	United States	2012	73	67	75	73	288	+8	T60
Tom Watson	United States	2003, 2005, 2007	74	70	72	73	289	+9	T64

==== Missed the cut ====
Player	Country	Year won	R1	R2	Total	To par
Russ Cochran	United States	2011	76	76	152	+12
Pete Oakley	United States	2004	79	82	161	+21

== Round summaries ==
=== First round ===
Thursday, 25 July 2019

Place	Player	Score	To par
T1	(England) Paul Broadhurst	67	−3
T1	(United States) Scott Dunlap	67	−3
T1	(United States) Scott Parel	67	−3
T1	(United States) Wes Short Jr.	67	−3
T5	(United States) Woody Austin	68	−2
T5	(Northern Ireland) Darren Clarke	68	−2
T5	(United States) Ken Duke	68	−2
T5	(United States) Tom Gillis	68	−2
T5	(Scotland) Colin Montgomerie	68	−2
T5	(Sweden) Magnus Persson Atlevi	68	−2

=== Second round ===
Friday, 26 July 2019

Place	Player	Score	To par
1	(United States) Wes Short Jr.	67-67=134	−6
2	(United States) Scott Dunlap	67-68=135	−5
3	(Northern Ireland) Darren Clarke	68-68=136	−4
T4	(United States) Bart Bryant	69-68=137	−3
T4	(United States) Ken Duke	68-69=137	−3
T4	(South Africa) Retief Goosen	70-67=137	−3
T7	(United States) Woody Austin	68-70=138	−2
T7	(United States) Doug Barron	69-69=138	−2
T7	(England) Paul Broadhurst	67-71=138	−2
T7	(England) Roger Chapman	70-68=138	−2
T7	(Germany) Bernhard Langer	71-67=138	−2
T7	(Scotland) Colin Montgomerie	68-70=138	−2
T7	(United States) Scott Parel	67-71=138	−2
T7	(Wales) Phillip Price	71-67=138	−2

Amateurs: Elliott (+3), Kelbrick (+5), Foster (+6), McWilliams (+11), Sansome (+14), Crowther (+15), Lacy (+16), Francis (+20)

=== Third round ===
Saturday, 27 July 2019

Place	Player	Score	To par
1	(England) Paul Broadhurst	67-71-67=205	−5
2	(United States) Woody Austin	68-70-68=206	−4
T3	(United States) Ken Duke	68-69-70=207	−3
T3	(United States) Wes Short Jr.	67-67-73=207	−3
T5	(Wales) Stephen Dodd	71-68-69=208	−2
T5	(Germany) Bernhard Langer	71-67-70=208	−2
T5	(Australia) David McKenzie	70-70-68=208	−2
T5	(Wales) Phillip Price	71-67-70=208	−2
T9	(Northern Ireland) Darren Clarke	68-68-73=209	−1
T9	(England) Paul Eales	74-69-66=209	−1
T9	(United States) Tim Petrovic	74-68-67=209	−1

Amateurs: Elliott (+9), Kelbrick (+13)

=== Final round ===
Sunday, 28 July 2019

Place	Player	Score	To par	Money (€)
1	(Germany) Bernhard Langer	71-67-70-66=274	−6	281,632
2	(England) Paul Broadhurst	67-71-67-71=276	−4	187,788
T3	(South Africa) Retief Goosen	70-67-74-66=277	−3	95,086
T3	(United States) Tim Petrovic	74-68-67-68=277	−3	95,086
T5	(United States) Doug Barron	69-69-73-67=278	−2	65,370
T5	(Australia) David McKenzie	70-70-68-70=278	−2	65,370
T7	(United States) Woody Austin	68-70-68-73=279	−1	43,577
T7	(South Africa) David Frost	72-67-73-67=279	−1	43,577
T7	(United States) Wes Short Jr.	67-67-73-72=279	−1	43,577
T10	(England) Roger Chapman	70-68-73-69=280	E	28,601
T10	(Northern Ireland) Darren Clarke	68-68-73-71=280	E	28,601
T10	(United States) Ken Duke	68-69-70-73=280	E	28,601
T10	(United States) Bob Estes	70-71-74-65=280	E	28,601
T10	(Spain) Miguel Ángel Jiménez	71-68-74-67=280	E	28,601
T10	(France) Thomas Levet	74-68-71-67=280	E	28,601

Amateurs: Elliott (+13), Kelbrick (+17)

Preceded by 2019 Senior Players Championship	Senior Major Championships	Succeeded by 2020 Regions Tradition
