= Sahalee Country Club =

Country club in the northwest United States

- Location in the United States Location in Washington (state)
- 47.635°N 122.057°W

Club information
- Location: 21200 NE Sahalee CC Drive; Sammamish, Washington, U.S.
- Elevation: 590 feet (180 m)
- Established: 1969, 57 years ago
- Type: Private
- Tota holes: 27
- Tournaments: PGA Championship (1998); Women's PGA Championship (2016, 2024); U.S. Senior Open (2010); WGC-NEC Invitational (2002); GTE Northwest Classic (1986); Sahalee Players Championship
- Greens: Poa annua
- Fairways: Perennial ryegrass; Poa Annua
- Website: Sahalee.com

South & North Combined (Championship Course)
- Designed by: Ted Robinson, renovated by Rees Jones in 1996
- Par: 72
- Length: 7,003 yards (6,404 m)
- Course rating: 74.6
- Slope rating: 139

East & South Combined
- Designed by: Ted Robinson, renovated by Rees Jones in 1996 (South) & 1998 (East)
- Par: 72
- Length: 6,952 yards (6,357 m)
- Course rating: 74.6
- Slope rating: 139

North & East Combined
- Designed by: Ted Robinson, renovated by Rees Jones in 1996 (North) & 1998 (East)
- Par: 72
- Length: 6,966 yards (6,370 m)
- Course rating: 74.6
- Slope rating: 139

The Sahalee Country Club is a private golf course and country club in the northwest United States, located in Sammamish, Washington, a suburb east of Seattle. In the Chinookan language, Sahalee means "high heavenly ground." The 27-hole course is located on a heavily forested plateau immediately east of Lake Sammamish.

Sahalee is best known as the site of the PGA Championship in 1998, the first of Vijay Singh's three major titles. It was also the host of the WGC-NEC Invitational in 2002, won by Craig Parry. The course's original architect was Ted Robinson; in preparation for the PGA Championship, Rees Jones renovated the course in 1996, 1997, and 1998. The course has been listed on Golf Digest's Top 100 Courses list for over twenty years, and is the host of the Sahalee Players Championship, a top amateur tournament in the region. It also was the site of the inaugural GTE Northwest Classic in 1986, a former senior tour event.

After the success of the 1998 PGA Championship, Sahalee was selected in 1999 to host the championship again in 2010. That decision was reversed by the PGA of America in January 2005, when the 2010 event was abruptly moved to Whistling Straits in Sheboygan, Wisconsin, which had recently hosted the very profitable 2004 edition and set new attendance records. The PGA of America stated that it was concerned about the possibility of reduced financial support in the Pacific Northwest; it was scheduled to be held less than six months after the conclusion of the 2010 Winter Olympics in Vancouver, BC.

In February 2007, the USGA selected Sahalee to host the U.S. Senior Open in 2010, held from July 29 to August 1. Bernhard Langer of Germany shot eight under par and won by three strokes over local favorite Fred Couples, Couples, originally from Seattle, was in his first full season on the Champions Tour.

In June 2016, Sahalee hosted its first women's major, the Women's PGA Championship; Brooke Henderson defeated top-ranked Lydia Ko on the first hole of a playoff. In June 2024, Sahalee again hosted the Women's PGA Championship.

== General information ==
Since Sahalee is a private course, guests can only play with a member. The pro shop is open from 8:00 am to 5:00 pm. The dress code states that denim is not allowed and that a collared shirt is required; slacks or non-denim shorts are allowed. Metal spiked shoes are not allowed; neither are groups of five. The course is open year-round, and its greens are aerated in May and September. The greens and fairways are both Poa annua grass. Cell phones are not allowed within 100 yards of the clubhouse.

== History ==
The course opened 57 years ago in 1969, following two years of construction at the then-remote site. The three nines were designed by golf course architect Ted Robinson. The first head professional was Paul Runyan, who won 29 times on the PGA Tour, including the PGA Championship twice, in 1934 and 1938. He played for the U.S. on four Ryder Cup teams, and won the Senior PGA Championship in 1961 and 1962.

In preparation for the 1998 PGA Championship, Rees Jones was brought in to renovate the courses. The South and North nines (where the championship was held) were renovated in 1996. The East course was renovated after the 1998 PGA Championship. The original clubhouse was replaced in 2001 with a new 43,000-square-foot (4,000 m^{2}) structure.

== Course information ==
Sahalee is made up of three sets of nine holes; South, North, and East nines. PGA tournaments have been held on the combination of the South and North nines. The course is like many in the Pacific Northwest, with tall evergreen trees, primarily Douglas fir and red cedar, lining the narrow fairways. The course has many bunkers and several water hazards.

On average, each hole has five or six hazards. The East Course has two ponds that come into play on two of the holes. This is the same for the North Course and South Course. The North Course's fairways are slightly hilly, whereas the South Course and East Course have relatively flat fairways with the occasional hump to create an uneven lie.

The combination of the South and North courses creates a par 72 layout. From the black (back) tees, the course measures 7,003 yards (6,404 m) with a slope rating of 74.2/139. From the blue tees the course measures 6,754 yards (6,176 m) and has a slope rating of 73.4/138. From the white tees the course measures 6,321 yards (5,780 m) with a slope rating of 71.0/135. From the red tees the course measures 5,712 yards (5,223 m) with a slope rating of 72.8/127. For the 1998 PGA Championship, the course played as a par 70 at 6,906 yards (6,315 m).

The combination of the East and South courses creates a par 72 layout. From the black tees the course measures 6,952 yards (6,357 m) with a slope rating of 74.6/139. From the blue tees the course measures 6,769 yards (6,190 m) with a slope rating of 73.4/138. From the white tees the course measures 6,322 yards (5,781 m) with a slope rating of 71.0/135. From the red tees the course measures 5,725 yards (5,235 m) with a slope rating of 72.8/127.

The combination of the North and East courses creates a par 72 layout. From the black tees the course measures 6,966 yards (6,370 m) with a slope rating of 74.6/139. From the blue tees the course measures 6,769 with a slope rating of 73.4/138. From the white tees the course measures 6,335 yards (5,793 m) with a slope rating of 71.5/133. From the red tees the course measures 5,747 yards (5,255 m) with a slope rating of 72.8/127.

As a par 70, Greg Kraft holds the course record of 65, which is five under par. As a par 71, Robert Allenby holds the course record of 63, eight under par.

== Major tournaments ==
Year	Major tournament	Winner	Score	Margin of victory	Runner-up	Winner's share ($)
1998	PGA Championship	(Fiji) Vijay Singh	271 (−9)	2 strokes	(United States) Steve Stricker	540,000
2010	U.S. Senior Open	(Germany) Bernhard Langer	272 (−8)	3 strokes	(United States) Fred Couples	470,000
2016	Women's PGA Championship	(Canada) Brooke Henderson	278 (−6)	Playoff	(New Zealand) Lydia Ko	525,000
2024	Women's PGA Championship	(South Korea) Amy Yang	281 (−7)	3 strokes	3 players	1,560,000

- All played on the South and North nines

=== 1998 PGA Championship ===
Lee Janzen, 1993 and 1998 U.S. Open champion, said of Sahalee: "I think the best way to prepare for this course would have been to go to a big city, like New York, and maybe play down Fifth Avenue ... With the trees being so large, and so close to the fairway, you immediately see the only shot you can possibly hit. And that's straight down the middle."

Justin Leonard, 1997 British Open champion, said: "Everybody heard there were a lot of trees ... I don't think anybody imagined this many."

Davis Love III, defending champion: "You have to hit two very good iron shots in a row to get on the green ... For me, it's probably one or two drivers the whole golf course. You don't ever really get to a hole where you can just bomb a driver down there and have an easy shot." "Sahalee is going to be a test of golf that we haven't seen before..."

Ernie Els, 1994 and 1997 U.S. Open champion: "And it's a pretty good test, too," he said. "Trees come into play everywhere, and if you miss the fairway you're probably going to make bogey. You better hit as straight as you can."

Colin Montgomerie said: "It's a lovely course ... it's a beautiful place to play and a beautiful test of golf...The trees get in the way too often...That's the only problem. From above, I'm sure it looks like you can only walk single-file down the fairways."
