= 2017 Regions Tradition =

Coordinates: 33.43°N 86.651°W

Tournament information
- Dates: May 18–21
- Location: Hoover, Alabama
- Course(s): Greystone Golf & Country Club; Founders Course
- Organized by: PGA Tour Champions
- Tour(s): PGA Tour Champions

Statistics
- Par: 72
- Length: 7,277 yd (6,654 m)
- Field: 79
- Prize fund: $2,300,000

Champion
- (Germany) Bernhard Langer
- 268 (−20)

Location in Alabama

The 2017 Regions Tradition was a senior major golf championship and the 29th Regions Tradition, held from May 18–21 at Greystone Golf & Country Club in Hoover, Alabama. It was the second Regions Tradition played at the course.

World Golf Hall of Fame member Bernhard Langer won his second consecutive Regions Tradition and his eighth senior major championship by five strokes over Scott McCarron and Scott Parel.

== Venue ==
The 2017 event was the second Regions Tradition played at Greystone Golf & Country Club.

=== Course layout ===
Hole	Yards	Par	Hole	Yards	Par
1	400	4	10	178	3
2	532	5	11	438	4
3	453	4	12	453	4
4	180	3	13	531	5
5	623	5	14	191	3
6	435	4	15	609	5
7	207	3	16	443	4
8	448	4	17	201	3
9	429	4	18	526	5
Out	3,707	36	In	3,570	36
Source:		Total		7,277	72

== Field ==
The field consisted of 79 professional competitors.

== Round summaries ==
=== First round ===
Thursday, May 18, 2017

Lee Janzen, Miguel Ángel Jiménez, Scott McCarron, and Jeff Sluman all shot 65 (−7) in the first round to lead by one stroke.

Place	Player	Score	To par
T1	(United States) Lee Janzen	65	−7
T1	(Spain) Miguel Ángel Jiménez	65	−7
T1	(United States) Scott McCarron	65	−7
T1	(United States) Jeff Sluman	65	−7
5	(United States) Kenny Perry	66	−6
T6	(United States) Tommy Armour III	67	−5
T6	(United States) Marco Dawson	67	−5
T6	(South Africa) David Frost	67	−5
T6	(United States) Fred Funk	67	−5
T6	(United States) Scott Parel	67	−5

=== Second round ===
Friday, May 19, 2010

Two-time Tradition champion Fred Funk made eight birdies in the second round to shoot a 65 (−7), and lead Scott Parel by one stroke. Parel shot a six-under-par 66 in the second round to enter the third round at 133 (−11).

Place	Player	Score	To par
1	(United States) Fred Funk	67-65=132	−12
2	(United States) Scott Parel	67-66=133	−11
3	(United States) Scott McCarron	65-70=135	−9
T4	(Spain) Miguel Ángel Jiménez	65-71=136	−8
T4	(United States) Kenny Perry	66-70=136	−8
T4	(United States) Jeff Sluman	65-71=136	−8
T4	(United States) Kevin Sutherland	68-68=136	−8
T8	(United States) Tom Lehman	69-68=137	−7
T8	(Canada) Rod Spittle	69-68=137	−7

=== Third round ===
Saturday, May 20, 2010

Bernhard Langer shot the round of the day to finish the third round at 204 (−12). Fred Funk and Scott Parel both shot 70 (−2) to remain in 1st and 2nd place, respectively.

Place	Player	Score	To par
1	(United States) Fred Funk	67-65-70=202	−14
2	(United States) Scott Parel	67-66-70=203	−13
T3	(Germany) Bernhard Langer	69-69-66=204	−12
T3	(United States) Scott McCarron	65-70-69=204	−12
T5	(United States) Tom Lehman	69-68-69=206	−10
T5	(United States) Jeff Sluman	65-71-70=206	−10
T5	(United States) David Toms	70-70-66=206	−10
T8	(United States) Glen Day	70-68-69=207	−9
T8	(United States) Billy Mayfair	71-69-67=207	−9

=== Final round ===
Sunday, May 21, 2017

Bernhard Langer birdied the first two holes to tie Fred Funk and Scott Parel for the lead. Funk regained the lead after a birdie on the par-5 5th hole and extended his lead to two strokes after birdieing the par-4 sixth. Langer cut the lead to one stroke after birdies on seventh and ninth holes, and would take a three shot lead over Parel when Funk triple bogeyed the par-4 12th hole. Langer then birdied 13, 14, and 17 to win his eighth senior major championship by 5 strokes.

Place	Player	Score	To par	Money ($)
1	(Germany) Bernhard Langer	69-69-66-64=268	−20	345,000
T2	(United States) Scott McCarron	65-70-69-69=273	−15	184,000
T2	(United States) Scott Parel	67-66-70-70=273	−15	184,000
T4	(United States) Marco Dawson	67-71-70-66=274	−14	124,200
T4	(United States) Fred Funk	67-65-70-72=274	−14	124,200
T6	(United States) Brian Henninger	71-69-69-67=276	−12	78,200
T6	(United States) Tom Lehman	69-68-69-70=276	−12	78,200
T6	(United States) Wes Short Jr.	69-70-69-68=276	−12	78,200
T6	(United States) David Toms	70-70-66-70=276	−12	78,200

==== Scorecard ====
Hole	1	2	3	4	5	6	7	8	9	10	11	12	13	14	15	16	17	18
Par	4	5	4	3	5	4	3	4	4	3	4	4	5	3	5	4	3	5
(Germany) Langer	−13	−14	−14	−13	−14	−14	−15	−15	−16	−16	−16	−17	−18	−19	−19	−19	−20	−20
(United States) McCarron	−12	−13	−12	−12	−12	−13	−12	−11	−11	−12	−12	−12	−13	−13	−13	−14	−15	−15
(United States) Parel	−13	−14	−14	−14	−14	−14	−13	−13	−13	−14	−14	−14	−15	−15	−15	−15	−14	−15
(United States) Dawson	−8	−8	−7	−7	−8	−8	−9	−9	−9	−9	−9	−9	−10	−10	−10	−12	−13	−14
(United States) Funk	−14	−14	−14	−14	−15	−16	−16	−16	−16	−16	−16	−13	−14	−14	−14	−14	−14	−14

Cumulative tournament scores, relative to par

Eagle	Birdie	Bogey	Triple bogey+

== Notes and references ==
Preceded by 2016 U.S. Senior Open	Senior Major Championships	Succeeded by 2017 Senior PGA Championship
