= 2017 Senior Open Championship =

Tournament information
- Dates: 27–30 July 2017
- Location: Porthcawl, Wales, United Kingdom; 51.492°N 3.726°W
- Course: Royal Porthcawl Golf Club
- Organised by: The R&A
- Tours: European Senior Tour; PGA Tour Champions
- Format: 72 holes stroke play

Statistics
- Par: 71
- Length: 6,901 yd (6,310 m)
- Field: 144 players, 76 after cut
- Cut: 155 (+13)
- Prize fund: US$1,700,000 £1,500,000

Champion
- (Germany) Bernhard Langer
- 280 (−4)

Location map
- Location in Europe Location on the British Isles Location in Wales

The 2017 Senior Open Championship was a senior major golf championship and the 31st Senior Open Championship, held 27–30 July at Royal Porthcawl Golf Club in Porthcawl, Wales. It was the 2nd Senior Open Championship played at the course and the 15th Senior Open Championship played as a senior major championship.

World Golf Hall of Fame member Bernhard Langer won by three strokes over Corey Pavin. The 2017 event was Langer's third Senior Open Championship title and his tenth senior major championship victory. Langer also won the 2014 Senior Open Championship at Royal Porthcawl Golf Club.

== Venue ==
The 2017 event was the second Senior Open Championship played at Royal Porthcawl.

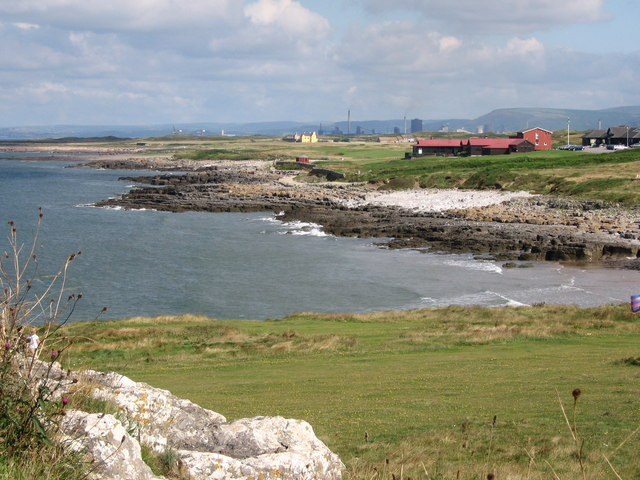
Royal Porthcawl Golf Club

=== Course layout ===
Hole	Yards	Par	Hole	Yards	Par
1	427	4	10	400	4
2	374	4	11	355	4
3	451	4	12	194	3
4	455	4	13	551	5
5	212	3	14	435	4
6	515	5	15	173	3
7	381	4	16	466	4
8	122	3	17	430	4
9	456	4	18	504	5
Out	3,393	35	In	3,508	36
Source:		Total		6,901	71

== Field ==
The field of 144 competitors included 135 professionals and 9 amateurs. An 18-hole stroke play qualifying round was held on Monday, 24 July for players who were not already exempt.

=== Past champions in the field ===
==== Made the cut ====
Player	Country	Year(s) won	R1	R2	R3	R4	Total	To par	Finish
Bernhard Langer	Germany	2010, 2014	69	74	65	72	280	−4	1
Fred Couples	United States	2012	75	75	66	68	284	E	T3
Paul Broadhurst	England	2016	75	75	67	73	290	+6	T15
Tom Watson	United States	2003, 2005, 2007	72	77	67	75	291	+7	T23
Russ Cochran	United States	2011	77	73	69	74	293	+9	T31
Marco Dawson	United States	2015	79	76	70	71	296	+12	T45

== Round summaries ==
=== First round ===
Thursday, 27 July 2017

Bernhard Langer posted a two-under-par 69 on day one to lead by one shot.

Place	Player	Score	To par
1	(Germany) Bernhard Langer	69	−2
T2	(England) Carl Mason	70	−1
T2	(Argentina) Mauricio Molina	70	−1
T4	(United States) Billy Andrade	71	E
T4	(Australia) Peter Fowler	71	E
T4	(United States) Tom Lehman	71	E
T4	(Australia) Peter Lonard	71	E
T4	(United States) Billy Mayfair	71	E
T4	(Scotland) Colin Montgomerie	71	E
T4	(United States) Tom Pernice Jr.	71	E
T4	(France) Jean-François Remésy	71	E
T4	(South Africa) Chris Williams	71	E

=== Second round ===
Friday 28 July 2017

Scoring was difficult during the second round as only one player, Santiago Luna, broke par on Friday. Steve Flesch and Brad Faxon shot even-par rounds of 71, while the rest of the field shot over-par. Langer struggled to a 74 (+3) and fell back into a five-way tie for the lead going into the third round.

Place	Player	Score	To par
T1	(United States) Steve Flesch	72-71=143	+1
T1	(Germany) Bernhard Langer	69-74=143	+1
T1	(United States) Tom Lehman	71-72=143	+1
T1	(United States) Billy Mayfair	71-72=143	+1
T1	(Argentina) Mauricio Molina	70-73=143	+1
6	(United States) Clark Dennis	72-72=144	+2
T7	(United States) Mike Goodes	74-72=146	+4
T7	(Australia) Peter Lonard	71-75=146	+4
T7	(Australia) David McKenzie	73-73=146	+4

Amateurs: Lutz (+9), Haag (+13), Curtis (+20), Hastie (+21), Hoit (+22), White (+22), Tomlinson (+29), Creed (+31), Bell (+34)

=== Third round ===
Saturday, 29 July 2017

Langer rebounded with a bogey-free, six-under-par 65 on Saturday to take a four stroke lead into the final round. 2010 Senior Open runner-up Corey Pavin also shot a third round 65 to move into 2nd place. Peter Lonard shot a 67 (−4) to move into 3rd place and 5 shots of Langer's lead.

Place	Player	Score	To par
1	(Germany) Bernhard Langer	69-74-65=208	−5
2	(United States) Corey Pavin	73-74-65=212	−1
3	(Australia) Peter Lonard	71-75-67=213	E
T4	(United States) Steve Flesch	72-71-71=214	+1
T4	(Spain) Miguel Ángel Jiménez	76-73-65=214	+1
T4	(United States) Billy Mayfair	71-72-71=214	+1
T7	(Sweden) Magnus Persson Atlevi	77-73-65=215	+2
T7	(United States) Scott Dunlap	76-73-66=215	+2
T7	(Spain) Santiago Luna	77-70-68=215	+2
T7	(Wales) Phillip Price	74-73-68=215	+2

Amateurs: Lutz (+9), Haag (+18)

=== Final round ===
Sunday, 30 July 2017

Bernhard Langer's lead was extended to five shots after Pavin bogeyed the first hole, however, the lead was cut to three after a birdie by Pavin and a bogey by Langer on the par-4 3rd hole. Pavin cut Langer's lead to two after a birdie on the par-3 5th. After a bogey by Pavin on the par-5 13th hole, Langer's lead was extended to three strokes, which he carried into the 72nd hole. Langer and Pavin both birdied the 72nd hole, as Langer secured the title and his tenth senior major championship.

Place	Player	Score	To par	Money (€)
1	(Germany) Bernhard Langer	69-74-65-72=280	−4	266,923
2	(United States) Corey Pavin	73-74-65-71=283	−1	177,975
T3	(United States) Billy Andrade	71-76-69-68=284	E	82,694
T3	(United States) Fred Couples	75-75-66-68=284	E	82,694
T3	(Australia) Peter Lonard	71-75-67-71=284	E	82,694
T6	(Sweden) Magnus Persson Atlevi	77-73-65-70=285	+1	48,025
T6	(Spain) Miguel Ángel Martín	72-76-68-69=285	+1	48,025
T6	(Wales) Phillip Price	74-73-68-70=285	+1	48,025
T9	(United States) Billy Andrade	71-72-71-72=286	+2	33,927
T9	(Australia) David McKenzie	73-73-71-69=286	+2	33,927

Amateurs: Lutz (+17), Haag (+21)

==== Scorecard ====
Hole	1	2	3	4	5	6	7	8	9	10	11	12	13	14	15	16	17	18
Par	4	4	4	4	3	5	4	3	4	4	4	3	5	4	3	4	4	5
(Germany) Langer	−5	−5	−4	−4	−4	−4	−4	−4	−4	−4	−4	−4	−4	−4	−3	−3	−3	−4
(United States) Pavin	E	−1	−1	−1	−2	−2	−2	−2	−2	−2	−2	−2	−1	−1	E	E	E	−1
(United States) Andrade	+3	+3	+3	+3	+3	+2	+1	E	E	E	E	E	−1	−1	−1	E	E	E
(United States) Couples	+2	+3	+3	+3	+3	+2	+2	+2	+3	+2	+2	+2	+1	+1	+1	+1	+1	E
(Australia) Lonard	+1	+1	+1	+1	+1	E	E	−1	−1	−1	E	E	E	E	E	E	E	E
(Sweden) Atlevi	+2	+2	+2	+3	+3	+2	+1	+1	+2	+2	+3	+3	+2	+2	+1	+1	+1	+1
(Spain) Martín	+3	+3	+2	+1	+1	+1	+1	E	E	−1	−1	−1	E	+1	+1	+1	+1	+1
(Wales) Price	+3	+3	+3	+2	+1	+1	+2	+2	+2	+2	+2	+1	+1	+1	+2	+1	+1	+1

Cumulative tournament scores, relative to par

Birdie	Bogey

== Notes and references ==
Preceded by 2017 Senior Players Championship	Senior Major Championships	Succeeded by 2018 Regions Tradition
