= 2010 U.S. Senior Open =

Tournament information
- Dates: July 29 – August 1, 2010
- Location: Sammamish, Washington; 47.635°N 122.057°W
- Courses: Sahalee Country Club (South & North nines)
- Organized by: USGA
- Tours: Champions Tour; European Senior Tour

Statistics
- Par: 70
- Length: 6,896 yards (6,306 m)
- Field: 156 players, 69 after cut
- Cut: 150 (+10)
- Prize fund: $2,600,000
- Winner's share: $470,000

Champion
- (Germany) Bernhard Langer
- 272 (−8)

Location map
- Location in the United States Location in Washington

The 2010 U.S. Senior Open was a senior major golf championship and the 31st U.S. Senior Open, held July 29 to August 1 at Sahalee Country Club in Sammamish, Washington, a suburb east of Seattle. It was the first U.S. Senior Open played at the course, which hosted the PGA Championship in 1998.

World Golf Hall of Fame member Bernhard Langer won by three strokes over Seattle native Fred Couples, his second senior major championship victory in as many weeks.

== Venue ==
=== Course layout ===
Hole	Yards	Par	Hole	Yards	Par
1	403	4	10	400	4
2	508	5	11	545	5
3	415	4	12	455	4
4	392	4	13	170	3
5	190	3	14	370	4
6	480	4	15	443	4
7	420	4	16	375	4
8	443	4	17	212	3
9	205	3	18	470	4
Out	3,456	35	In	3,440	35
Source:		Total		6,896	70

- South and North nines
- Holes 6 and 18 are par fives for members

== Field ==
The field consisted of 156 competitors: 127 professionals and 29 amateurs. 18-hole stroke play qualifying rounds were held at several locations for players who were not already exempt.

== Round summaries ==
=== First round ===
Thursday, July 29, 2010

Bruce Vaughan posted a four-under-par 66 on day one to lead by two strokes.

Place	Player	Score	To par
1	(United States) Bruce Vaughan	66	−4
T2	(United States) Tim Jackson (a)	68	−2
T2	(United States) Loren Roberts	68	−2
T4	(Germany) Bernhard Langer	69	−1
T4	(United States) Michael Allen	69	−1
T4	(United States) Tom Lehman	69	−1
T4	(Japan) Naomichi Ozaki	69	−1
T4	(United States) Mark Calcavecchia	69	−1
T9	(United States) Fred Couples	70	E
T9	(United States) Jay Haas	70	E
T9	(United States) Scott Simpson	70	E
T9	(United States) Tom Watson	70	E

=== Second round ===
Friday, July 30, 2010

2010 Senior Open champion Bernhard Langer shot a 68 (−2) to take a two shot lead over Tommy Armour III, John Cook, and J. R. Roth.

Place	Player	Score	To par
1	(Germany) Bernhard Langer	69-68=137	−3
T2	(United States) Tommy Armour III	71-68=139	−1
T2	(United States) John Cook	71-68=139	−1
T2	(United States) J. R. Roth	73-66=139	−1
T5	(United States) Michael Allen	69-71=140	E
T5	(United States) Fred Couples	70-70=140	E
T5	(United States) Tom Watson	70-70=140	E
T5	(United States) Loren Roberts	68-72=140	E
T9	(United States) Tom Kite	72-69=141	+1
T9	(United States) Scott Simpson	70-71=141	+1

=== Third round ===
Saturday, July 31, 2010

Seattle native Fred Couples shot a five-under-par 65 in the third round to enter the final round at 205 (−5). Bernhard Langer shot a second consecutive round of 68 (−2) to share the 54-hole lead with Couples.

Place	Player	Score	To par
T1	(Germany) Bernhard Langer	69-68-68=205	−5
T1	(United States) Fred Couples	70-70-65=205	−5
T3	(United States) Tom Kite	72-69-69=210	E
T3	(Taiwan) Lu Chien-soon	71-71-68=211	E
T5	(United States) Michael Allen	69-71-71=210	+1
T5	(United States) Tommy Armour III	71-68-72=211	+1
T5	(United States) John Cook	71-68-72=211	+1
T5	(Australia) Peter Senior	73-70-68=211	+1
T9	(United States) Loren Roberts	68-72-72=212	+2
T9	(United States) Scott Simpson	70-71-71=212	+2

Amateurs: Jackson (+11), Hudson (+16), Grace (+19)

=== Final round ===
Sunday, August 1, 2010

Fred Couples birdied the par-4 1st hole to take a one stroke lead over Bernhard Langer. On the par-5 2nd hole, Couples drove his tee shot into the first cut of rough and was left with 227-yards for his second shot. He decided to lay up short of a water hazard which surrounds the front of the second green and was left with 69-yards for his third shot. Couples' third shot found the water and resulted in a triple bogey. Langer made a long birdie putt on the 2nd green to take a three shot lead over Couples. He extended his lead to four strokes with a birdie on the par-4 6th hole. After two late birdies by Couples, Langer entered the 72nd hole with a two stroke lead and converted a 7-foot par putt to win his second consecutive senior major championship by three strokes.

Place	Player	Score	To par	Money ($)
1	(Germany) Bernhard Langer	69-68-68-67=272	−8	470,000
2	(United States) Fred Couples	70-70-65-70=275	−5	280,000
T3	(United States) Olin Browne	73-70-70-65=278	−2	145,760
T3	(United States) John Cook	71-68-72-67=278	−2	145,760
5	(United States) Tom Watson	70-70-75-66=281	+1	96,938
T6	(United States) Michael Allen	69-71-71-71=282	+2	81,573
T6	(Australia) Peter Senior	73-70-68-71=282	+2	81,573
T8	(United States) Tom Kite	72-69-69-73=283	+3	65,735
T8	(Taiwan) Lu Chien-soon	71-71-68-73=283	+3	65,735
T8	(United States) Larry Mize	74-69-72-68=283	+3	65,735

Amateurs: Jackson (+11), Grace (+25), Hudson (+27)

==== Scorecard ====
Hole	1	2	3	4	5	6	7	8	9	10	11	12	13	14	15	16	17	18
Par	4	5	4	4	3	4	4	4	3	4	5	4	3	4	4	4	3	4
(Germany) Langer	−5	−6	−7	−7	−7	−8	−8	−8	−8	−8	−8	−8	−8	−8	−8	−8	−8	−8
(United States) Couples	−6	−3	−4	−4	−4	−4	−4	−4	−4	−4	−4	−4	−4	−5	−5	−6	−6	−5
(United States) Browne	+3	+2	+1	E	E	E	−1	−2	−2	−2	−2	−2	−2	−2	−2	−2	−2	−2
(United States) Cook	+1	E	E	E	E	E	E	E	+1	+1	E	E	E	E	E	−1	−2	−2
(United States) Watson	+4	+3	+3	+3	+2	+2	+2	+3	+4	+4	+4	+4	+3	+3	+2	+2	+1	+1
(Australia) Senior	+1	E	E	E	+1	+2	+3	+3	+3	+3	+2	+3	+3	+3	+3	+2	+2	+2
(United States) Allen	+1	+2	+2	+1	+1	+1	+1	+2	+3	+3	+2	+1	+1	+1	+2	+2	+2	+2

Cumulative tournament scores, relative to par

Birdie	Bogey	Triple bogey+

== Notes and references ==
Preceded by 2010 Senior Open Championship	Senior Major Championships	Succeeded by 2010 JELD-WEN Tradition
