= 3M Championship =

Coordinates: 45.177°N 93.213°W

Tournament information
- Location: Blaine, Minnesota, U.S.
- Established: 1993, 33 years ago
- Courses: TPC Twin Cities (since 2001); Bunker Hills Golf Course (1993–2000)
- Par: 72
- Length: 7,114 yards (6,505 m)
- Tour: PGA Tour Champions
- Format: Stroke play - 54 holes (no cut)
- Prize fund: $1.75 million
- Month played: August
- Final year: 2018

Tournament record score
- Aggregate: 191 David Frost (2010)
- To par: −25 David Frost (2010)

Final champion
- (United States) Kenny Perry

Location in the United States
Location in Minnesota

The 3M Championship was a professional golf tournament in Minnesota on the PGA Tour Champions, played annually at the TPC Twin Cities in Blaine, a suburb north of Minneapolis. Based in Saint Paul, 3M was the main sponsor of the tournament.

It debuted 33 years ago in 1993 as the Burnet Senior Classic, and was originally held at the Bunker Hills Golf Course in nearby Coon Rapids. After eight editions, the tournament moved to the year-old TPC Twin Cities in 2001, when 3M took over as sponsor. The purse in 2017 was $1.75 million, with a winner's share of $262,500.

Within the tournament was the "Greats of Golf Challenge," an exhibition scramble on Saturday among teams of former major winners and hall of famers of both genders. Recent participants include Jack Nicklaus, Gary Player, Lee Trevino, and Nancy Lopez.

In 2018, it was announced that the 2018 3M Championship would be the final playing of the event, as it would be replaced by the 3M Open on the PGA Tour starting in 2019. Kenny Perry was the final champion of the event, winning his third 3M Championship on August 5, 2018.

== Winners ==
Year	Dates	Champion	Country	Winning score	Margin	Purse ($)
3M Championship
2018	Aug 3–5	Kenny Perry (3)	United States	195 (−21)	3 strokes	1,750,000
2017	Aug 4–6	Paul Goydos	United States	196 (−20)	Playoff	1,750,000
2016	Aug 5–7	Joe Durant	United States	197 (−19)	Playoff	1,750,000
2015	Jul 31 – Aug 2	Kenny Perry (2)	United States	198 (−18)	4 strokes	1,750,000
2014	Aug 1–3	Kenny Perry	United States	193 (−23)	1 stroke	1,750,000
2013	Aug 2–4	Tom Pernice Jr.	United States	199 (−17)	1 stroke	1,750,000
2012	Aug 3–5	Bernhard Langer (2)	Germany	198 (−18)	2 strokes	1,750,000
2011	Aug 5–7	Jay Haas	United States	201 (−15)	1 stroke	1,750,000
2010	Aug 6–8	David Frost	South Africa	191 (−25)	7 strokes	1,750,000
2009	Jul 10–12	Bernhard Langer	Germany	200 (−16)	1 stroke	1,750,000
2008	Jul 18–20	R. W. Eaks	United States	193 (−23)	6 strokes	1,750,000
2007	Aug 3–5	D. A. Weibring	United States	198 (−18)	1 stroke	1,750,000
2006	Aug 4–6	David Edwards	United States	204 (−12)	2 strokes	1,750,000
2005	Aug 5–7	Tom Purtzer	United States	201 (−15)	1 stroke	1,750,000
2004	Aug 6–8	Tom Kite	United States	203 (−13)	1 stroke	1,750,000
2003	Aug 8–10	Wayne Levi	United States	205 (−11)	1 stroke	1,750,000
2002	Aug 9–11	Hale Irwin (3)	United States	204 (−13)	3 strokes	1,750,000
2001	Aug 10–12	Bruce Lietzke	United States	207 (−9)	2 strokes	1,750,000
Coldwell Banker Burnet Classic
2000	Aug 4–6	Ed Dougherty	United States	197 (−19)	2 strokes	1,600,000
1999	Jul 23–25	Hale Irwin (2)	United States	201 (−15)	2 strokes	1,500,000
1998	Aug 8–9	Leonard Thompson	United States	134 (−10)^	Playoff	1,500,000
Burnet Senior Classic
1997	Jul 18–20	Hale Irwin	United States	199 (−17)	2 strokes	1,350,000
1996	Jul 19–21	Vicente Fernández	Argentina	205 (−11)	1 stroke	1,250,000
1995	Aug 11–13	Raymond Floyd	United States	201 (−15)	1 stroke	1,100,000
1994	Aug 19–21	Dave Stockton	United States	203 (−13)	1 stroke	1,050,000
1993	Jun 18–20	Chi-Chi Rodríguez	United States	201 (−15)	2 strokes	1,050,000

^ The 1998 event was shortened to 36 holes due to rain

- Green highlight indicates scoring records

== Multiple winners ==
Three players won this tournament more than once.

- 3 wins
  - Hale Irwin: 1997, 1999, 2002
  - Kenny Perry: 2014, 2015, 2018
- 2 wins
  - Bernhard Langer: 2009, 2012
