= 2014 Senior Open Championship =

Tournament information
- Dates: 24–27 July 2014
- Location: Porthcawl, Wales, United Kingdom; 51.492°N 3.726°W
- Course: Royal Porthcawl Golf Club
- Organised by: The R&A
- Tours: European Senior Tour; Champions Tour
- Format: 72 holes stroke play

Statistics
- Par: 71
- Length: 6,901 yd (6,310 m)
- Field: 144 players, 76 after cut
- Cut: 149 (+7)
- Prize fund: US$2,000,000 £1,250,000

Champion
- (Germany) Bernhard Langer
- 266 (−18)

Location map
- Location in Europe Location on the British Isles Location in Wales

The 2014 Senior Open Championship was a senior major golf championship and the 28th Senior Open Championship, held 24–27 July at Royal Porthcawl Golf Club in Porthcawl, Wales. It was the first Senior Open Championship played at the course and the 12th Senior Open Championship played as a senior major championship.

World Golf Hall of Fame member Bernhard Langer led wire-to-wire and broke the tournament scoring record, finishing at 18-under-par. The 2014 event was Langer's second Senior Open Championship title and his fourth senior major championship victory.

== Venue ==
The 2014 event was the first Senior Open Championship played at Royal Porthcawl. Royal Porthcawl hosted the Senior Open Championship for a second time in 2017.

=== Course layout ===
Hole	Yards	Par	Hole	Yards	Par
1	427	4	10	400	4
2	374	4	11	355	4
3	451	4	12	194	3
4	455	4	13	551	5
5	212	3	14	435	4
6	515	5	15	173	3
7	381	4	16	466	4
8	122	3	17	430	4
9	456	4	18	504	5
Out	3,393	35	In	3,508	36
Source:		Total		6,901	71

== Field ==
The field of 144 competitors included 135 professionals and 9 amateurs. An 18-hole stroke play qualifying round was held on Monday, 21 July for players who were not already exempt.

=== Past champions in the field ===
==== Made the cut ====
Player	Country	Year(s) won	R1	R2	R3	R4	Total	To par	Finish
Bernhard Langer	Germany	2010	65	66	68	67	266	−18	1
Russ Cochran	United States	2011	74	73	67	72	286	+2	T10
Tom Watson	United States	2003, 2005, 2007	74	66	69	77	286	+2	T10
Fred Couples	United States	2012	71	71	68	78	288	+4	T13
Bruce Vaughan	United States	2008	73	69	73	73	288	+4	T13

==== Missed the cut ====
Player	Country	Year won	R1	R2	Total	To par
Mark Wiebe	United States	2013	76	77	153	+11
Noboru Sugai	Japan	2002	83	84	167	+25

=== Past winners of The Open Championship in the field ===
The field included two former winners of The Open Championship. One of them made the cut; 1975, 1977, 1980, 1982 and 1983 Open champion Tom Watson (tied 10th). 1985 Open champion Sandy Lyle did not make the cut.

== Round summaries ==
=== First round ===
Thursday, 24 July 2014

Bernhard Langer posted a six-under-par 65 on day one to lead by two shots.

Place	Player	Score	To par
1	(Germany) Bernhard Langer	65	−6
2	(United States) Bob Tway	67	−4
3	(South Africa) Chris Williams	68	−3
4	(Scotland) Andrew Oldcorn	69	−2
T5	(Canada) Rick Gibson	70	−1
T5	(Spain) Pedro Linhart	70	−1
T7	(United States) Fred Couples	71	E
T7	(United States) Scott Dunlap	71	E
T7	(Australia) Peter Fowler	71	E
T7	(South Africa) David Frost	71	E
T7	(United States) Jeff Hart	71	E
T7	(Scotland) Kenny Hutton	71	E
T7	(United States) Steve Jones	71	E
T7	(England) Jamie Spence	71	E
T7	(United States) George Zahringer (a)	71	E

=== Second round ===
Friday 25 July 2014

Langer extended his lead to seven shots after a second round 66, entering the weekend at 131 (−11). Colin Montgomerie and Chris Williams finished the second round in a tie for 2nd at 138 (−4). Tom Pernice Jr. shot the round of the day, a 64 (−7), which included eight birdies and one bogey.

Place	Player	Score	To par
1	(Germany) Bernhard Langer	65-66=131	−11
T2	(Scotland) Colin Montgomerie	72-66=138	−4
T2	(South Africa) Chris Williams	68-70=138	−4
4	(Spain) Pedro Linhart	70-69=139	−3
T5	(United States) Bob Tway	66-71=140	−2
T5	(United States) Tom Watson	74-66=140	−2
T7	(Canada) Rick Gibson	70-71=141	−1
T7	(England) Barry Lane	72-69=141	−1
T9	(United States) Fred Couples	71-71=142	E
T9	(United States) Tom Pernice Jr.	78-64=142	E
T9	(United States) Bruce Vaughan	73-69=142	E

Amateurs: Lutz (+2), Zahringer (+7), Reynard (+8), Ambridge (+17), Bell (+17), Kinghorn (+18), Lehew (+25), Gold (+26), Cooper (+32)

=== Third round ===
Saturday, 26 July 2014

Langer shot a third consecutive round in the 60s with a third round 68 (−3), and extended his lead to eight shots over Rick Gibson, who shot a 66 (−5). Colin Montgomerie fell back into a tie for seventh place after shooting a 40 (+4) on the back nine and finishing the day with a 72 (+1).

Place	Player	Score	To par
1	(Germany) Bernhard Langer	65-66-68=199	−14
2	(Canada) Rick Gibson	70-71-66=207	−6
3	(United States) Bob Tway	67-73-68=208	−5
T4	(United States) Scott Dunlap	71-73-65=209	−4
T4	(United States) Tom Watson	74-66-69=209	−4
T4	(South Africa) Chris Williams	68-70-71=209	−4
T7	(United States) Fred Couples	71-71-68=210	−3
T7	(England) Barry Lane	72-69-69=210	−3
T7	(Scotland) Colin Montgomerie	72-66-72=210	−3
10	(United States) Jeff Sluman	73-71-67=211	−2

Amateurs: Lutz (+4), Zahringer (+4)

=== Final round ===
Sunday, 27 July 2014

Bernhard Langer shot a final round 67 (−4) to win his fourth senior major championship and his second Senior Open Championship by 13 strokes. Langer finished with a record score of −18, breaking the previous scoring record by one stroke, which had been held by Tom Watson and Carl Mason. Scoring was difficult on Sunday as only 10 players broke par during the final round, and Langer's four-under-par 67 was the lowest score of the day. Montgomerie recovered from a third round 72 (+1) with a final round 69 (−2), finishing in second place. Gibson finished in a tie for third after a final round 75 (+4), which included seven bogies and three birdies. Bob Tway also struggled in the final round, shooting a 76 (+5), which included two double bogies and a triple bogey on the par-4 3rd hole. Dunlap, Watson, Williams, and Couples shot final rounds of 75, 77, 80, and 78, respectively.

Place	Player	Score	To par	Money (€)
1	(Germany) Bernhard Langer	65-66-68-67=266	−18	248,535
2	(Scotland) Colin Montgomerie	72-66-72-69=279	−5	165,753
T3	(Canada) Rick Gibson	70-71-66-75=282	−2	77,017
T3	(England) Barry Lane	72-69-69-72=282	−2	77,017
T3	(United States) Tom Pernice Jr.	78-64-70-70=282	−2	77,017
T6	(United States) Scott Dunlap	71-73-65-75=284	E	48,462
T6	(United States) Bob Tway	67-73-68-76=284	E	48,462
T8	(Spain) Miguel Ángel Jiménez	74-69-74-68=285	+1	35,327
T8	(United States) Kirk Triplett	72-72-71-70=285	+1	35,327
T10	(United States) Russ Cochran	74-73-67-72=286	+2	28,601
T10	(United States) Tom Watson	74-66-69-77=286	+2	28,601

Amateurs: Lutz (+11), Zahringer (+13)

==== Scorecard ====
Hole	1	2	3	4	5	6	7	8	9	10	11	12	13	14	15	16	17	18
Par	4	4	4	4	3	5	4	3	4	4	4	3	5	4	3	4	4	5
(Germany) Langer	−14	−15	−16	−15	−15	−16	−17	−17	−17	−17	−16	−17	−17	−17	−17	−17	−17	−18
(Scotland) Montgomerie	−3	−2	−1	−1	−2	−2	−3	−3	−3	−3	−3	−3	−3	−3	−3	−3	−4	−5
(Canada) Gibson	−6	−6	−6	−6	−5	−6	−5	−5	−4	−3	−3	−3	−4	−3	−3	−2	−1	−2
(England) Lane	−3	−3	−2	−2	−1	−2	−2	−2	−1	−1	−1	−1	−2	−2	−2	−1	−1	−2
(United States) Pernice Jr.	−1	−1	E	+1	E	−1	−1	−1	E	−1	E	E	E	E	E	E	−1	−2
(United States) Dunlap	−3	−3	−3	−2	−3	−4	−3	−3	−3	−2	−1	+1	E	E	E	E	E	E
(United States) Tway	−4	−5	−2	−2	−3	−4	−2	−2	−1	−1	−1	−1	−1	+1	+1	+1	+1	E

Cumulative tournament scores, relative to par

Birdie	Bogey	Double bogey	Triple bogey+

== Notes and references ==
Preceded by 2014 Senior Players Championship	Senior Major Championships	Succeeded by 2015 Regions Tradition
