= Invesco QQQ Championship =

Coordinates: 34.1321°N 118.8846°W

Tournament information
- Location: Lake Sherwood, California, U.S.
- Established: 2016
- Course: Sherwood Country Club
- Par: 72
- Length: 7,006 yards (6,406 m)
- Tour: PGA Tour Champions
- Format: Stroke play - 54 holes (no cut)
- Prize fund: $2.0 million
- Month played: October/November

Tournament record score
- Aggregate: 202 Colin Montgomerie (2019); 202 Bernhard Langer (2019)
- To par: −14 as above

Current champion
- (Scotland) Colin Montgomerie

Location in the United States
Location in California

The Invesco QQQ Championship is a professional golf tournament on the PGA Tour Champions, played at Sherwood Country Club in Lake Sherwood, California. The inaugural edition in October 2016 featured a 72-player field competing for a $2 million purse, and was a no-cut 54-hole event.

== Winners ==
Year	Date	Champion	Country	Winning score	Margin	Purse ($)	Ref
Invesco QQQ Championship
2020	No tournament						
2019	Nov 3	Colin Montgomerie	Scotland	202 (−14)	Playoff	2,000,000	
2018	Oct 28	Scott Parel	United States	205 (−11)	1 stroke	2,000,000	
PowerShares QQQ Championship
2017	Oct 29	Bernhard Langer	Germany	205 (−11)	Playoff	2,000,000	
2016	Oct 30	Tom Pernice Jr.	United States	203 (−13)	1 stroke	2,000,000	
