= 2017 PGA Tour Champions season =

Golf tour season

- Duration: January 18, 2017 – November 12, 2017
- Number of official events: 26
- Most wins: (Germany) Bernhard Langer (7)
- Charles Schwab Cup: (United States) Kevin Sutherland
- Money list: (Germany) Bernhard Langer
- Player of the Year: (Germany) Bernhard Langer
- Rookie of the Year: (United States) Jerry Kelly

The 2017 PGA Tour Champions season was the 38th season of PGA Tour Champions (formerly the Senior PGA Tour and the Champions Tour), the main professional golf tour in the United States for men aged 50 and over.

== Schedule ==
The following table lists official events during the 2017 season.

Date	Tournament	Location	Purse (US$)	Winner (Note: The number in parentheses after each winner's name is the number of PGA Tour Champions events they had won up to and including that tournament. This information is only shown for PGA Tour Champions members.)	Notes
Jan 20	Mitsubishi Electric Championship at Hualalai	Hawaii	1,800,000	(Germany) Bernhard Langer (30)	
Feb 12	Allianz Championship	Florida	1,750,000	(United States) Scott McCarron (3)	
Feb 19	Chubb Classic	Florida	1,600,000	(United States) Fred Couples (12)	
Mar 19	Tucson Conquistadores Classic	Arizona	1,700,000	(United States) Tom Lehman (10)	
Apr 2	Mississippi Gulf Resort Classic	Mississippi	1,600,000	(Spain) Miguel Ángel Jiménez (4)	
Apr 16	Mitsubishi Electric Classic	Georgia	1,800,000	(Canada) Stephen Ames (1)	
Apr 23	Bass Pro Shops Legends of Golf	Missouri	2,400,000	(Paraguay) Carlos Franco (2) and (Fiji) Vijay Singh (1)	Team event
May 7	Insperity Invitational	Texas	2,150,000	(United States) John Daly (1)	
May 21	Regions Tradition	Alabama	2,300,000	(Germany) Bernhard Langer (31)	PGA Tour Champions major championship
May 28	KitchenAid Senior PGA Championship	Virginia	2,800,000	(Germany) Bernhard Langer (32)	Senior major championship
Jun 11	Principal Charity Classic	Iowa	1,750,000	(United States) Brandt Jobe (1)	
Jun 25	American Family Insurance Championship	Wisconsin	2,000,000	(United States) Fred Couples (13)	
Jul 2	U.S. Senior Open	Massachusetts	4,000,000	(United States) Kenny Perry (9)	Senior major championship
Jul 16	Constellation Senior Players Championship	Maryland	2,800,000	(United States) Scott McCarron (4)	PGA Tour Champions major championship
Jul 30	The Senior Open Championship	Wales	£1,500,000	(Germany) Bernhard Langer (33)	Senior major championship
Aug 6	3M Championship	Minnesota	1,750,000	(United States) Paul Goydos (5)	
Aug 20	Dick's Sporting Goods Open	New York	2,000,000	(United States) Scott McCarron (5)	
Aug 27	Boeing Classic	Washington	2,100,000	(United States) Jerry Kelly (1)	
Sep 3	Shaw Charity Classic	Canada	2,350,000	(United States) Scott McCarron (6)	
Sep 10	Japan Airlines Championship	Japan	2,500,000	(Scotland) Colin Montgomerie (5)	
Sep 17	Pacific Links Bear Mountain Championship	Canada	1,800,000	(United States) Jerry Kelly (2)	
Sep 24	PURE Insurance Championship	California	2,000,000	(Germany) Bernhard Langer (34)	
Oct 15	SAS Championship	North Carolina	2,100,000	(Scotland) Colin Montgomerie (6)	
Oct 22	Dominion Charity Classic	Virginia	2,000,000	(Germany) Bernhard Langer (35)	Charles Schwab Cup playoff event
Oct 29	PowerShares QQQ Championship	California	2,000,000	(Germany) Bernhard Langer (36)	Charles Schwab Cup playoff event
Nov 12	Charles Schwab Cup Championship	Arizona	2,500,000	(United States) Kevin Sutherland (1)	Charles Schwab Cup playoff event

=== Unofficial events ===
The following events were sanctioned by PGA Tour Champions, but did not carry official money, nor were wins official.

Date	Tournament	Location	Purse ($)	Winner(s)	Notes
Jan 15	Diamond Resorts Invitational	Florida	750,000	(United States) Woody Austin	New to PGA Tour Champions
Dec 17	PNC Father-Son Challenge	Florida	1,085,000	(Argentina) Ángel Cabrera and son Ángel Cabrera Jr.	Team event

== Charles Schwab Cup ==
The Charles Schwab Cup was based on tournament results during the season, calculated using a points-based system.

Position	Player	Points
1	(United States) Kevin Sutherland	3,280
2	(Germany) Bernhard Langer	2,234
3	(United States) Scott McCarron	2,100
4	(United States) Kenny Perry	1,834
5	(Fiji) Vijay Singh	1,640

== Money list ==
The money list was based on prize money won during the season, calculated in U.S. dollars.

Position	Player	Prize money ($)
1	(Germany) Bernhard Langer	3,677,359
2	(United States) Scott McCarron	2,674,195
3	(United States) Kevin Sutherland	1,961,732
4	(United States) Kenny Perry	1,728,070
5	(Spain) Miguel Ángel Jiménez	1,538,366

== Awards ==
Award	Winner	Ref.
Player of the Year (Jack Nicklaus Trophy)	(Germany) Bernhard Langer	
Rookie of the Year	(United States) Jerry Kelly	
Scoring leader (Byron Nelson Award)	(Germany) Bernhard Langer	
