= Ginn Championship at Hammock Beach =

Golf tournament

The Ginn Championship at Hammock Beach was a golf tournament on the Champions Tour from 2007 to 2008. It was played for the first time in 2007 in Palm Coast, Florida at the Ocean Course at Ginn Hammock Beach Resort (formerly the Ocean Hammock Golf Club).

The purse for the 2008 tournament was US$2,500,000, with $375,000 going to the winner.

On January 29, 2009, Ginn Resorts announced that they were discontinuing their sponsorship of the Ginn Championship at Hammock Beach, the Ginn Open on the LPGA Tour and the Ginn sur Mer Classic on the PGA Tour.

== Winners ==
Ginn Championship Hammock Beach Resort

- 2008 Bernhard Langer
- 2007 Keith Fergus
