= 2016 Regions Tradition =

Coordinates: 33.43°N 86.651°W

Tournament information
- Dates: May 19–22
- Location: Hoover, Alabama
- Course(s): Greystone Golf & Country Club; Founders Course
- Organized by: PGA Tour Champions
- Tour(s): PGA Tour Champions

Statistics
- Par: 72
- Length: 7,277 yd (6,654 m)
- Field: 81
- Prize fund: $2,300,000

Champion
- (Germany) Bernhard Langer
- 271 (−17)

Location in Alabama

The 2016 Regions Tradition was a senior major golf championship and the 28th Regions Tradition, held from May 19–22 at Greystone Golf & Country Club in Hoover, Alabama. It was the first Regions Tradition played at the course.

World Golf Hall of Fame member Bernhard Langer won his first Regions Tradition and his sixth senior major championship by 6 strokes over Olin Browne.

== Venue ==
The 2016 event was the first Regions Tradition played at Greystone Golf & Country Club.

=== Course layout ===
Hole	Yards	Par	Hole	Yards	Par
1	400	4	10	178	3
2	532	5	11	438	4
3	453	4	12	453	4
4	180	3	13	531	5
5	623	5	14	191	3
6	435	4	15	609	5
7	207	3	16	443	4
8	448	4	17	201	3
9	429	4	18	526	5
Out	3,707	36	In	3,570	36
Source:		Total		7,277	72

== Field ==
The field consisted of 81 professional competitors.

== Round summaries ==
=== First round ===
Thursday, May 19, 2016

2014 Tradition champion Kenny Perry posted an eight-under-par 64 on day one to lead by two strokes over Bernhard Langer and Gene Sauers.

Place	Player	Score	To par
1	(United States) Kenny Perry	64	−8
T2	(Germany) Bernhard Langer	66	−6
T2	(United States) Gene Sauers	66	−6
4	(United States) Billy Andrade	67	−5
T5	(United States) Scott Dunlap	68	−4
T5	(United States) Jeff Maggert	68	−4
T5	(Australia) Craig Parry	68	−4
T5	(United States) Jeff Sluman	68	−4
T5	(United States) Kevin Sutherland	68	−4
T5	(Mexico) Esteban Toledo	68	−4
T5	(United States) Duffy Waldorf	68	−4

=== Second round ===
Friday, May 20, 2016

Kenny Perry shot a 70 (−2) in the second round to lead by one stroke over Bernhard Langer and Billy Andrade.

Place	Player	Score	To par
1	(United States) Kenny Perry	64-70=134	−10
T2	(Germany) Bernhard Langer	66-69=135	−9
T2	(United States) Billy Andrade	67-68=135	−9
T4	(United States) Scott McCarron	70-66=136	−8
T4	(United States) Gene Sauers	66-70=136	−8
T4	(United States) Kevin Sutherland	68-68=136	−8
T7	(United States) Olin Browne	71-67=138	−6
T7	(United States) Mark Calcavecchia	72-66=138	−6
T7	(United States) Willie Wood	71-67=138	−6

=== Third round ===
Saturday, May 21, 2016

Bernhard Langer shot 69 (−3) in the third round to take a four stroke lead into the final round. Kenny Perry double bogeyed the first hole on Saturday and went on to shoot a two-over-par 74, falling into a tie for second place with Scott McCarron.

Place	Player	Score	To par
1	(Germany) Bernhard Langer	66-69-69=204	−12
T2	(United States) Scott McCarron	70-66-72=205	−8
T2	(United States) Kenny Perry	64-70-74=205	−8
T4	(United States) Mark Calcavecchia	72-66-71=206	−7
T4	(United States) John Daly	70-70-69=206	−7
T4	(United States) Gary Hallberg	72-69-68=206	−7
T4	(Scotland) Colin Montgomerie	70-69-70=206	−7
T8	(United States) Billy Andrade	67-68-75=210	−6
T8	(United States) Olin Browne	71-67-72=212	−6
T8	(United States) John Huston	71-72-67=212	−6
T8	(United States) Larry Mize	70-69-71=212	−6
T8	(United States) Gene Sauers	66-70-74=212	−6
T8	(United States) Joey Sindelar	73-67-70=212	−6
T8	(United States) Kirk Triplett	72-67-71=212	−6

=== Final round ===
Sunday, May 22, 2016

Bernhard Langer extended his lead to five strokes after birdieing the par-4 1st hole. Olin Browne moved into a tie for second with Kirk Triplett after making eagle on the par-5 2nd hole. Browne cut Langer's lead to three after birdieing #10, but Langer responded with birdies on the 12th and 13th holes to regain a four shot lead. Leading by four with three holes to play, Langer birdied the 16, 17, and 18 and defeated Browne by six strokes.

Place	Player	Score	To par	Money ($)
1	(Germany) Bernhard Langer	66-69-69-67=271	−17	345,000
2	(United States) Olin Browne	71-67-72-67=277	−11	202,400
T3	(United States) Tommy Armour III	72-68-72-66=278	−10	137,233
T3	(United States) Joey Sindelar	73-67-70-68=278	−10	137,233
T3	(United States) Kirk Triplett	72-67-71-68=278	−10	137,233
6	(United States) Scott McCarron	70-66-72-71=279	−9	92,000
T7	(United States) Gary Hallberg	72-69-68-71=280	−8	78,200
T7	(United States) Duffy Waldorf	68-72-73-67=280	−8	78,200
T9	(United States) Doug Garwood	69-71-71-70=281	−7	59,800
T9	(United States) Jeff Hart	71-70-70-70=281	−7	59,800
T9	(United States) Larry Mize	70-69-71-71=281	−7	59,800

==== Scorecard ====
Hole	1	2	3	4	5	6	7	8	9	10	11	12	13	14	15	16	17	18
Par	4	5	4	3	5	4	3	4	4	3	4	4	5	3	5	4	3	5
(Germany) Langer	−13	−13	−13	−13	−13	−12	−12	−12	−12	−12	−12	−13	−14	−14	−14	−15	−16	−17
(United States) Browne	−6	−8	−8	−8	−8	−8	−8	−8	−8	−9	−9	−10	−10	−10	−10	−10	−10	−11
(United States) Armour	−5	−5	−4	−4	−5	−5	−4	−4	−5	−5	−5	−5	−6	−7	−8	−9	−9	−10
(United States) Sindelar	−6	−7	−7	−8	−8	−8	−8	−8	−8	−8	−8	−8	−8	−8	−9	−10	−11	−10
(United States) Triplett	−7	−8	−8	−8	−8	−8	−7	−7	−7	−7	−7	−8	−8	−9	−10	−10	−10	−10
(United States) McCarron	−8	−7	−7	−7	−7	−6	−6	−6	−6	−7	−7	−7	−8	−8	−7	−7	−8	−9
(United States) Perry	−7	−6	−6	−6	−6	−6	−7	−6	−7	−8	−8	−9	−9	−8	−7	−7	−7	−3

Cumulative tournament scores, relative to par

Eagle	Birdie	Bogey	Triple bogey+

== Notes and references ==
Preceded by 2015 Senior Open Championship	Senior Major Championships	Succeeded by 2016 Senior PGA Championship
