= Boca Raton Championship =

Golf tournament

Coordinates: 26.397°N 80.116°W

TimberTech Championship
Tournament information
- Location: Boca Raton, Florida
- Established: 2007
- Courses: Broken Sound Club (Old Course)
- Par: 72
- Length: 6,807 yards (6,224 m)
- Tour: PGA Tour Champions
- Format: Stroke play
- Prize fund: US$2,200,000
- Month played: November

Tournament record score
- Aggregate: 197 Bernhard Langer (2019); 197 Pádraig Harrington (2023)
- To par: −19 Bernhard Langer (2019)

Current champion
- (Republic of Ireland) Pádraig Harrington

Final champion
- Location in the United States Location in Florida

There was also a tournament by the same name now called the Principal Charity Classic

The TimberTech Championship is a golf tournament on the PGA Tour Champions. Since 2007, it has been played at the Old Course at Broken Sound Club in Boca Raton, Florida.

The purse in 2023 was $2.2 million, with a winner's share of $350,000.

== Winners ==
| PGA Tour Champions (Charles Schwab Cup Playoffs) | 2021– |
| PGA Tour Champions (Regular) | 2007–2020 |

| # | Year | Winner | Score | To par | Margin of victory | Runner(s)-up |
TimberTech Championship
| 17th | 2023 | (Republic of Ireland) Pádraig Harrington | 197 | −16 | 7 strokes | (Germany) Bernhard Langer (South Korea) Charlie Wi |
| 16th | 2022 | (Germany) Bernhard Langer (3) | 199 | −17 | 6 strokes | (United States) Paul Goydos (Thailand) Thongchai Jaidee |
| 15th | 2021 | (New Zealand) Steven Alker (3) | 199 | −17 | 2 strokes | (United States) Jim Furyk (Spain) Miguel Ángel Jiménez |
| 14th | 2020 | (Northern Ireland) Darren Clarke | 199 | −17 | 1 stroke | (United States) Jim Furyk (Germany) Bernhard Langer |
Oasis Championship
| 13th | 2019 | (Germany) Bernhard Langer (2) | 197 | −19 | 5 strokes | (United States) Marco Dawson |
Boca Raton Championship
| 12th | 2018 | (United States) Mark Calcavecchia | 200 | −16 | 2 strokes | (Germany) Bernhard Langer |
Allianz Championship
| 11th | 2017 | (United States) Scott McCarron | 199 | −17 | 1 stroke | (Paraguay) Carlos Franco (United States) Kenny Perry |
| 10th | 2016 | (Mexico) Esteban Toledo | 205 | −11 | Playoff | (United States) Billy Andrade |
| 9th | 2015 | (United States) Paul Goydos | 204 | −12 | 1 stroke | (United States) Gene Sauers |
| 8th | 2014 | (United States) Michael Allen | 198 | −18 | Playoff | (United States) Duffy Waldorf |
| 7th | 2013 | (United States) Rocco Mediate | 199 | −17 | 2 strokes | (Germany) Bernhard Langer (United States) Tom Pernice Jr. |
| 6th | 2012 | (United States) Corey Pavin | 205 | −11 | Playoff | (Australia) Peter Senior |
| 5th | 2011 | (United States) Tom Lehman | 203 | −13 | 1 stroke | (United States) Jeff Sluman (Canada) Rod Spittle |
| 4th | 2010 | (Germany) Bernhard Langer | 199 | −17 | Playoff | (United States) John Cook |
| 3rd | 2009 | (United States) Mike Goodes | 201 | −15 | 1 stroke | (South Africa) Fulton Allem |
| 2nd | 2008 | (United States) Scott Hoch | 202 | −14 | 1 stroke | (United States) Brad Bryant (United States) Bruce Lietzke |
| 1st | 2007 | (England) Mark James | 201 | −15 | 2 strokes | (United States) Jay Haas |
