= 2014 Champions Tour =

Golf tour season

2014 Champions Tour season
- Duration: January 17, 2014 – November 2, 2014
- Number of official events: 26
- Most wins: (Germany) Bernhard Langer (5)
- Charles Schwab Cup: (Germany) Bernhard Langer
- Money list: (Germany) Bernhard Langer
- Player of the Year: (Germany) Bernhard Langer
- Rookie of the Year: (United States) Scott Dunlap

The 2014 Champions Tour was the 35th season of the Champions Tour (formerly the Senior PGA Tour), the main professional golf tour in the United States for men aged 50 and over.

== Schedule ==
The following table lists official events during the 2014 season.

Date	Tournament	Location	Purse (US$)	Winner (Note: The number in parentheses after each winner's name is the number of Champions Tour events they had won up to and including that tournament. This information is only shown for Champions Tour members.)	Notes
Jan 19	Mitsubishi Electric Championship at Hualalai	Hawaii	1,800,000	(Germany) Bernhard Langer (19)	
Feb 9	Allianz Championship	Florida	1,600,000	(United States) Michael Allen (6)	
Feb 16	ACE Group Classic	Florida	1,600,000	(United States) Kirk Triplett (3)	
Mar 16	Toshiba Classic	California	1,750,000	(United States) Fred Couples (10)	
Mar 23	Mississippi Gulf Resort Classic	Mississippi	1,600,000	(United States) Jeff Maggert (1)	
Apr 20	Greater Gwinnett Championship	Georgia	1,800,000	(Spain) Miguel Ángel Jiménez (1)	
May 4	Insperity Invitational	Texas	2,000,000	(Germany) Bernhard Langer (20)	
May 18	Regions Tradition	Alabama	2,200,000	(United States) Kenny Perry (6)	Champions Tour major championship
May 25	Senior PGA Championship	Michigan	2,000,000	(Scotland) Colin Montgomerie (1)	Senior major championship
Jun 1	Principal Charity Classic	Iowa	1,750,000	(United States) Tom Pernice Jr. (3)	
Jun 8	Big Cedar Lodge Legends of Golf	Missouri	2,750,000	(United States) Fred Funk (9) and (United States) Jeff Sluman (6)	Team event
Jun 22	Encompass Championship	Illinois	1,800,000	(United States) Tom Lehman (8)	
Jun 29	Constellation Senior Players Championship	Pennsylvania	2,700,000	(Germany) Bernhard Langer (21)	Champions Tour major championship
Jul 13	U.S. Senior Open	Oklahoma	3,500,000	(Scotland) Colin Montgomerie (2)	Senior major championship
Jul 27	The Senior Open Championship	Wales	£1,250,000	(Germany) Bernhard Langer (22)	Senior major championship
Aug 3	3M Championship	Minnesota	1,750,000	(United States) Kenny Perry (7)	
Aug 17	Dick's Sporting Goods Open	New York	1,850,000	(Germany) Bernhard Langer (23)	
Aug 24	Boeing Classic	Washington	2,000,000	(United States) Scott Dunlap (1)	
Aug 31	Shaw Charity Classic	Canada	2,250,000	(United States) Fred Couples (11)	
Sep 7	Quebec Championship	Canada	1,600,000	(United States) Wes Short Jr. (1)	
Sep 21	Pacific Links Hawai'i Championship	Hawaii	2,200,000	(United States) Paul Goydos (1)	
Sep 28	Nature Valley First Tee Open at Pebble Beach	California	1,900,000	(United States) John Cook (10)	
Oct 12	SAS Championship	North Carolina	2,100,000	(United States) Kirk Triplett (4)	
Oct 19	Greater Hickory Kia Classic at Rock Barn	North Carolina	1,600,000	(United States) Jay Haas (17)	
Oct 26	AT&T Championship	Texas	1,950,000	(United States) Michael Allen (7)	
Nov 2	Charles Schwab Cup Championship	Arizona	2,500,000	(United States) Tom Pernice Jr. (4)	Tour Championship

=== Unofficial events ===
The following events were sanctioned by the Champions Tour, but did not carry official money, nor were wins official.

Date	Tournament	Location	Purse ($)	Winners	Notes
Dec 14	PNC Father-Son Challenge	Florida	1,085,000	(Germany) Bernhard Langer and son Jason Langer	Team event

== Charles Schwab Cup ==
The Charles Schwab Cup was based on tournament results during the season, calculated using a points-based system.

Position	Player	Points
1	(Germany) Bernhard Langer	4,152
2	(Scotland) Colin Montgomerie	3,307
3	(United States) Jay Haas	2,461
4	(United States) Kenny Perry	2,059
5	(United States) Tom Pernice Jr.	1,892

== Money list ==
The money list was based on prize money won during the season, calculated in U.S. dollars.

Position	Player	Prize money ($)
1	(Germany) Bernhard Langer	3,074,189
2	(Scotland) Colin Montgomerie	2,064,381
3	(United States) Jay Haas	1,939,974
4	(United States) Tom Pernice Jr.	1,580,313
5	(United States) Kenny Perry	1,566,858

== Awards ==
Award	Winner	Ref.
Player of the Year (Jack Nicklaus Trophy)	(Germany) Bernhard Langer	
Rookie of the Year	(United States) Scott Dunlap	
Scoring leader (Byron Nelson Award)	(Germany) Bernhard Langer	
