= 2010 Champions Tour =

Golf tour season

2010 Champions Tour season
- Duration: January 22, 2010 – November 7, 2010
- Number of official events: 26
- Most wins: (Germany) Bernhard Langer (5)
- Charles Schwab Cup: (Germany) Bernhard Langer
- Money list: (Germany) Bernhard Langer
- Player of the Year: (Germany) Bernhard Langer
- Rookie of the Year: (United States) Fred Couples

The 2010 Champions Tour was the 31st season of the Champions Tour (formerly the Senior PGA Tour), the main professional golf tour in the United States for men aged 50 and over.

== Schedule ==
The following table lists official events during the 2010 season.

Date	Tournament	Location	Purse (US$)	Winner (Note: The number in parentheses after each winner's name is the number of Champions Tour events they had won up to and including that tournament. This information is only shown for Champions Tour members.)	Notes
Jan 24	Mitsubishi Electric Championship at Hualalai	Hawaii	1,800,000	(United States) Tom Watson (13)	
Feb 14	ACE Group Classic	Florida	1,600,000	(United States) Fred Couples (1)	
Feb 21	Allianz Championship	Florida	1,700,000	(Germany) Bernhard Langer (9)	
Mar 7	Toshiba Classic	California	1,700,000	(United States) Fred Couples (2)	
Mar 28	Cap Cana Championship	Dominican Republic	1,600,000	(United States) Fred Couples (3)	
Apr 18	Outback Steakhouse Pro-Am	Florida	1,700,000	(Germany) Bernhard Langer (10)	Pro-Am
Apr 25	Liberty Mutual Legends of Golf	Georgia	2,700,000	(United States) Mark O'Meara (1) and (Zimbabwe) Nick Price (2)	Team event
May 2	Mississippi Gulf Resort Classic	Mississippi	1,600,000	(United States) David Eger (3)	New tournament
May 16	Regions Charity Classic	Alabama	1,700,000	(United States) Dan Forsman (2)	
May 30	Senior PGA Championship	Colorado	2,000,000	(United States) Tom Lehman (2)	Senior major championship
Jun 6	Principal Charity Classic	Iowa	1,725,000	(Zimbabwe) Nick Price (3)	
Jun 27	Dick's Sporting Goods Open	New York	1,700,000	(United States) Loren Roberts (12)	
Jul 4	Montreal Championship	Canada	1,800,000	(United States) Larry Mize (1)	New tournament
Jul 25	The Senior Open Championship	Scotland	2,000,000	(Germany) Bernhard Langer (11)	Senior major championship
Aug 1	U.S. Senior Open	Washington	2,600,000	(Germany) Bernhard Langer (12)	Senior major championship
Aug 8	3M Championship	Minnesota	1,750,000	(South Africa) David Frost (1)	
Aug 22	JELD-WEN Tradition	Oregon	2,600,000	(United States) Fred Funk (6)	Champions Tour major championship
Aug 29	Boeing Classic	Washington	1,900,000	(Germany) Bernhard Langer (13)	
Sep 5	Home Care & Hospice First Tee Open at Pebble Beach	California	1,800,000	(United States) Ted Schulz (1)	
Sep 12	Posco E&C Songdo Championship	South Korea	3,000,000	(United States) Russ Cochran (1)	New tournament
Sep 26	SAS Championship	North Carolina	2,100,000	(United States) Russ Cochran (2)	
Oct 3	Ensure Classic at Rock Barn	North Carolina	1,750,000	(United States) Gary Hallberg (1)	
Oct 10	Constellation Energy Senior Players Championship	Maryland	2,700,000	(United States) Mark O'Meara (2)	Champions Tour major championship
Oct 24	Administaff Small Business Classic	Texas	1,700,000	(United States) Fred Couples (4)	
Oct 31	AT&T Championship	Texas	1,750,000	(Canada) Rod Spittle (1)	
Nov 7	Charles Schwab Cup Championship	California	2,500,000	(United States) John Cook (5)	Tour Championship

== Charles Schwab Cup ==
The Charles Schwab Cup was based on tournament results during the season, calculated using a points-based system.

Position	Player	Points
1	(Germany) Bernhard Langer	3,597
2	(United States) Fred Couples	2,771
3	(United States) John Cook	2,451
4	(United States) Michael Allen	1,846
5	(United States) Russ Cochran	1,818

== Money list ==
The money list was based on prize money won during the season, calculated in U.S. dollars.

Position	Player	Prize money ($)
1	(Germany) Bernhard Langer	2,648,939
2	(United States) Fred Couples	2,344,894
3	(United States) John Cook	1,924,305
4	(United States) Russ Cochran	1,754,003
5	(Zimbabwe) Nick Price	1,457,815

== Awards ==
Award	Winner	Ref.
Player of the Year (Jack Nicklaus Trophy)	(Germany) Bernhard Langer	
Rookie of the Year	(United States) Fred Couples	
Scoring leader (Byron Nelson Award)	(United States) Fred Couples	
Comeback Player of the Year	(United States) Ken Green	
