= 1998 PGA Championship =

Tournament information
- Dates: August 13–16, 1998
- Location: Sammamish, Washington; 47.635°N 122.057°W
- Courses: Sahalee Country Club (South & North nines)
- Organized by: PGA of America
- Tours: PGA Tour; PGA European Tour; Japan Golf Tour

Statistics
- Par: 70
- Length: 6,906 yards (6,315 m)
- Field: 148 players, 75 after cut
- Cut: 145 (+5)
- Prize fund: $3.0 million
- Winner's share: $540,000

Champion
- (Fiji) Vijay Singh
- 271 (−9)
- Location in the United States Location in Washington

The 1998 PGA Championship was the 80th PGA Championship, held August 13–16 at Sahalee Country Club in Sammamish, Washington, a suburb east of Seattle. Vijay Singh won the first of his three major championships, two strokes ahead of runner-up Steve Stricker.

This was only the tenth time the championship was played in the western half of the United States; the next was 22 years later at TPC Harding Park in San Francisco. It was the third major championship held in the Pacific Northwest, all PGA Championships. The previous two were match play events, held in Spokane in 1944 and Portland in 1946.

Sahalee was scheduled to host again in 2010, but the PGA of America reversed its decision in early 2005 and moved it to Whistling Straits in Wisconsin.

== Course layout ==
South and North nines

Hole	1	2	3	4	5	6	7	8	9	Out	10	11	12	13	14	15	16	17	18	In	Total
Yards	406	507	415	386	195	480	421	444	213	3,467	401	546	458	176	374	417	377	215	475	3,439	6,906
Par	4	5	4	4	3	4	4	4	3	35	4	5	4	3	4	4	4	3	4	35	70

- Holes 6 and 18 are par fives for members

== Round summaries ==
=== First round ===
Thursday, August 13, 1998

Place	Player	Score	To par
1	(United States) Tiger Woods	66	−4
T2	(United States) Billy Andrade	68	−2
T2	(United States) Paul Azinger	68	−2
T2	(United States) Glen Day	68	−2
T2	(United States) Bob Estes	68	−2
T2	(United States) Bill Glasson	68	−2
T2	(United States) Scott Gump	68	−2
T2	(United States) Frank Lickliter	68	−2
T2	(Japan) Shigeki Maruyama	68	−2
T10	(United States) Russ Cochran	69	−1
T10	(Namibia) Trevor Dodds	69	−1
T10	(Australia) Steve Elkington	69	−1
T10	(United States) Harrison Frazar	69	−1
T10	(Sweden) Per-Ulrik Johansson	69	−1
T10	(United States) Scott McCarron	69	−1
T10	(United States) Mark O'Meara	69	−1
T10	(United States) Kenny Perry	69	−1
T10	(United States) Craig Stadler	69	−1
T10	(United States) Steve Stricker	69	−1
T10	(United States) Bob Tway	69	−1

=== Second round ===
Friday, August 14, 1998

Place	Player	Score	To par
1	(Fiji) Vijay Singh	70-66=136	−4
T2	(United States) Scott Gump	68-69=137	−3
T2	(Scotland) Colin Montgomerie	70-67=137	−3
T2	(United States) Steve Stricker	69-68=137	−3
T5	(Australia) Steve Elkington	69-69=138	−2
T5	(United States) Brad Faxon	70-68=138	−2
T5	(United States) Davis Love III	70-68=138	−2
T5	(United States) Andrew Magee	70-68=138	−2
T5	(United States) Tiger Woods	66-72=138	−2
T10	(United States) John Cook	71-68=139	−1
T10	(United States) Glen Day	68-71=139	−1
T10	(South Africa) David Frost	70-69=139	−1
T10	(United States) Frank Lickliter	68-71=139	−1
T10	(United States) Mark O'Meara	69-70=139	−1

=== Third round ===
Saturday, August 15, 1998

Place	Player	Score	To par
T1	(Fiji) Vijay Singh	70-66-67=203	−7
T1	(United States) Steve Stricker	69-68-66=203	−7
T3	(Australia) Steve Elkington	69-69-69=207	−3
T3	(United States) Davis Love III	70-68-69=207	−3
T3	(United States) Billy Mayfair	73-67-67=207	−3
T6	(United States) Skip Kendall	72-68-68=208	−2
T6	(United States) Frank Lickliter	68-71-69=208	−2
T6	(United States) Mark O'Meara	69-70-69=208	−2
T6	(United States) Tiger Woods	66-72-70=208	−2
T10	(Australia) Robert Allenby	72-68-69=209	−1
T10	(United States) John Cook	71-68-70=209	−1
T10	(United States) Scott Gump	68-69-72=209	−1
T10	(United States) John Huston	70-71-68=209	−1
T10	(United States) Greg Kraft	71-73-65=209	−1

=== Final round ===
Sunday, August 16, 1998

As 54-hole co-leaders at 203 (−7), Vijay Singh and Steve Stricker were in the final pairing at noon PDT, four shots ahead of the field. Stricker stayed within a stroke until the par-3 17th, where both tee shots found the same bunker. Singh saved par but Stricker couldn't, and both parred 18; Singh shot 68 (−2) to win his first major by two strokes. Steve Elkington, the 1995 champion, carded a 67 to finish in solo third, a stroke behind Stricker. Nick Price, the champion in 1992 and 1994, shot a bogey-free 65 to equal the course record.

Place	Player	Score	To par	Money ($)
1	(Fiji) Vijay Singh	70-66-67-68=271	−9	540,000
2	(United States) Steve Stricker	69-68-66-70=273	−7	324,000
3	(Australia) Steve Elkington	69-69-69-67=274	−6	204,000
T4	(United States) Frank Lickliter	68-71-69-68=276	−4	118,000
T4	(United States) Mark O'Meara	69-70-69-68=276	−4	118,000
T4	(Zimbabwe) Nick Price	70-73-68-65=276	−4	118,000
T7	(United States) Davis Love III	70-68-69-70=277	−3	89,500
T7	(United States) Billy Mayfair	73-67-67-70=277	−3	89,500
9	(United States) John Cook	71-68-70-69=278	−2	80,000
T10	(United States) Skip Kendall	72-68-68-71=279	−1	69,000
T10	(United States) Kenny Perry	69-72-70-68=279	−1	69,000
T10	(United States) Tiger Woods	66-72-70-71=279	−1	69,000

==== Scorecard ====
Final round

Hole	1	2	3	4	5	6	7	8	9	10	11	12	13	14	15	16	17	18
Par	4	5	4	4	3	4	4	4	3	4	5	4	3	4	4	4	3	4
(Fiji) Singh	−7	−7	−7	−7	−8	−8	−8	−8	−8	−8	−9	−8	−8	−9	−9	−9	−9	−9
(United States) Stricker	−7	−6	−7	−8	−8	−7	−7	−7	−6	−6	−7	−7	−7	−8	−8	−8	−7	−7
(Australia) Elkington	−3	−3	−4	−4	−4	−4	−4	−3	−4	−4	−5	−5	−5	−6	−6	−6	−7	−6

Cumulative tournament scores, relative to par

Birdie	Bogey
