= Bernhard Langer =

German professional golfer (born 1957)

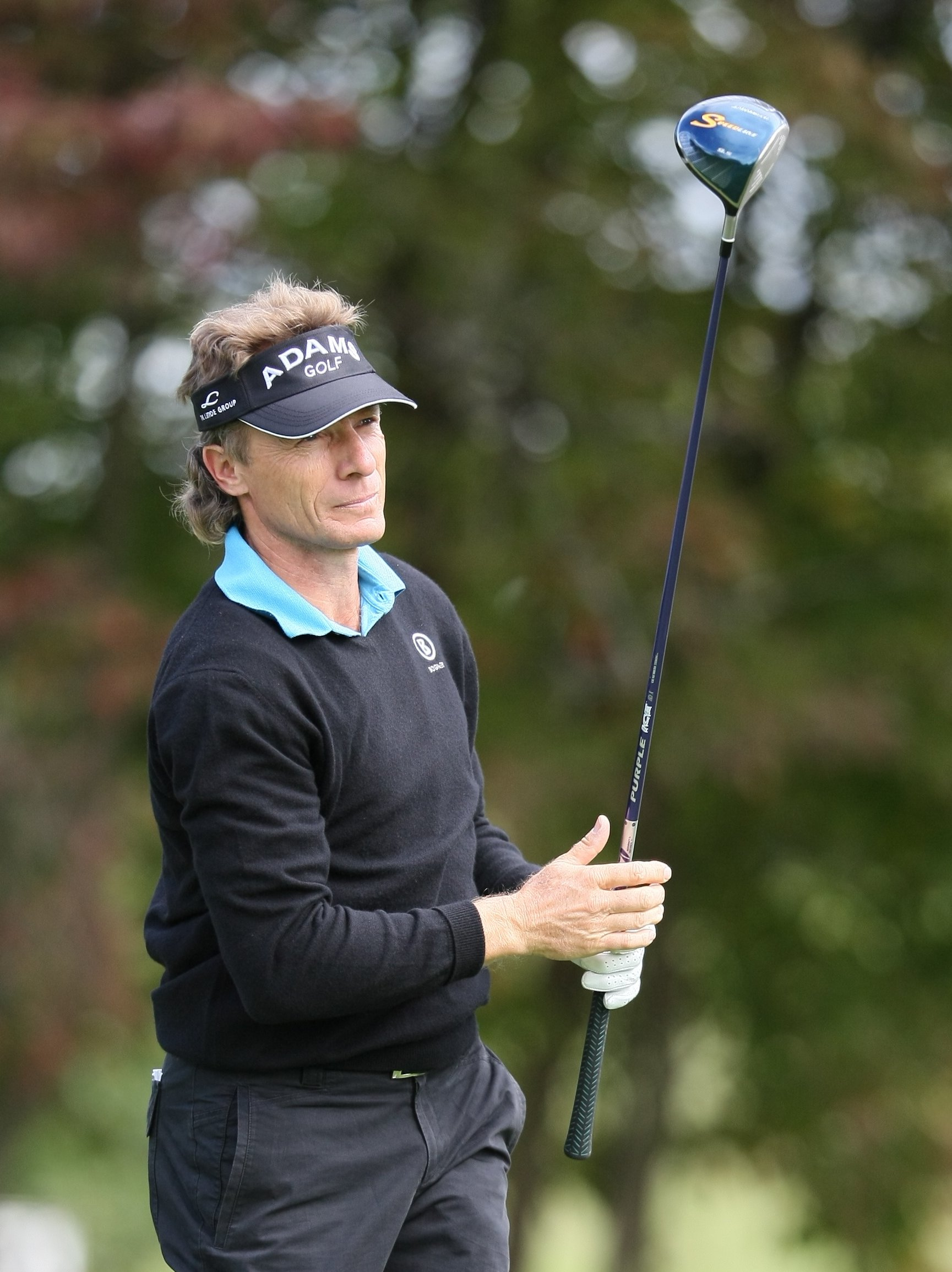
- Langer in 2009

Personal information
- Nationality: Germany
- Born: 27 August 1957 (age 69) Anhausen, Bavaria, West Germany
- Height: 1.74 m (5 ft 9 in)
- Weight: 74 kg (163 lb; 11.7 st)
- Spouse: Vikki Carol (m. 1984)
- Children: 4

Career
- Sport: Golf
- Turned professional: 1972
- Current tours: PGA Tour Champions; European Senior Tour
- Former tours: European Tour; PGA Tour
- Professional wins: 126
- Highest ranking: 1 (6 April 1986) (3 weeks)

Number of wins by tour
- PGA Tour: 3
- European Tour: 42 (2nd all-time)
- Japan Golf Tour: 1
- Asian Tour: 1
- PGA Tour of Australasia: 2
- PGA Tour Champions: 47 (1st all-time)
- European Senior Tour: 9 (Tied-5th all-time)
- Other: 30 (regular); 1 (senior)

Best results in major championships (wins: 2)
- Masters Tournament: Won: 1985, 1993
- PGA Championship: T21: 1987
- U.S. Open: T4: 1987
- The Open Championship: 2nd/T2: 1981, 1984

Achievements and awards
- World Golf Hall of Fame: 2001/2002 (Note: Langer was elected to the Hall of Fame in 2001 but deferred his induction until 2002) (member page)
- European Tour official money list winner/ Order of Merit winner: 1981, 1984
- European Tour Golfer of the Year: 1985, 1993
- PGA Tour Champions money list winner: 2008, 2009, 2010, 2012, 2013, 2014, 2015, 2016, 2017, 2018, 2020–21
- PGA Tour Champions Player of the Year: 2008, 2009, 2010, 2014, 2015, 2016, 2017, 2018, 2020–21
- Champions Tour Rookie of the Year: 2008
- PGA Tour Champions Byron Nelson Award: 2008, 2009, 2014, 2015, 2016, 2017, 2018
- PGA Tour Champions Charles Schwab Cup winner: 2010, 2014, 2015, 2016, 2018, 2020–21
- Payne Stewart Award: 2018

Bernhard Langer (German pronunciation: [ˈbɛʁnhaʁt ˈlaŋɐ]; born 27 August 1957) is a German professional golfer. He is a two-time Masters champion and was one of the world's leading golfers throughout the 1980s and 1990s. In 1986, he became the sport's first number one ranked player following the creation of the Sony Ranking (now the Official World Golf Ranking).

Langer is one of five golfers who have won professional golf events on all six continents where golf is played. He has victories on all the premiere tours, with 42 wins on the European Tour (2nd most all-time), three on the PGA Tour, and numerous international victories; including wins on the Japan Golf Tour, Asian Tour, Australasian Tour, and the Tour de las Américas.

The highlights of Langer's career are his two major championships. His first major win came at the 1985 Masters Tournament, where Langer won by two strokes over runners-up Seve Ballesteros, Raymond Floyd and Curtis Strange. His second major came at the 1993 Masters Tournament with a four-shot victory over Chip Beck. Langer has also finished runner-up on two occasions at The Open Championship (1981 and 1984).

After turning 50, Langer has established himself as the most successful player in the history of the PGA Tour Champions. He has won a record 12 senior major championships, been the money leader in a record 11 seasons and a record 7 times in a row. He has the most PGA Tour Champions career wins and is the only player to have achieved the current career Senior Grand Slam (winning each of the five current major championships at least once during one's career). He has won the 2010, 2014, 2017 and 2019 Senior Open Championship, the 2010 U.S. Senior Open and 2023 U.S. Senior Open, the 2016 and 2017 Regions Tradition, the 2014, 2015 and 2016 Constellation Senior Players Championship, and the 2017 Senior PGA Championship.

== Early life ==
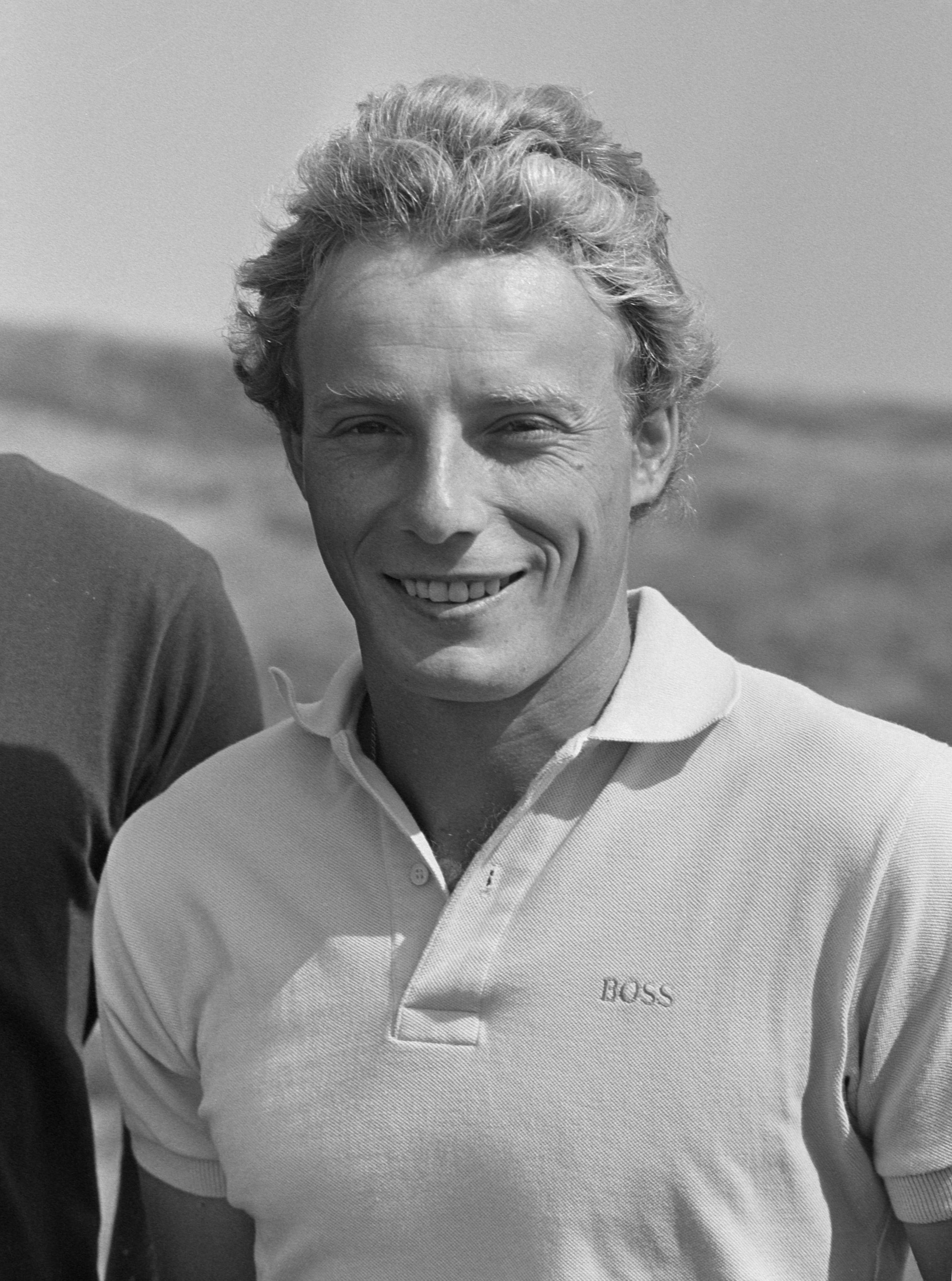
Bernhard Langer at an international tournament in Noordwijk, the Netherlands, in 1985

Langer was born on 27 August 1957 in the village of Anhausen, Germany. He is the younger brother of Erwin and Maria. Today it is a part of Diedorf municipality, near Augsburg, Bavaria, Germany.

== Professional career ==
In 1972, Langer turned professional. He has won many events in Europe and the United States, including The Masters in 1985 and 1993. He was the inaugural #1 when the Official World Golf Rankings were introduced in 1986. He ranks second in career wins on the European Tour (42) and has also played regularly on the U.S.-based PGA Tour, especially in the late 1980s and since 2000. He finished in a tie for fifth at The Open Championship the month before he turned 48, and regained a ranking in the top 100 three months before he turned 50. Along with Gary Player, David Graham, Hale Irwin and Justin Rose, Langer is one of only five players to have won official tournaments on all six continents on which golf is played. He played on ten Ryder Cup teams (1981, 1983, 1985, 1987, 1989, 1991, 1993, 1995, 1997, 2002), winning five times, and was the non-playing captain of the victorious European team in 2004.

Langer has battled the yips, having a strong tendency to flinch or twitch during putting. He has changed his putter grip numerous times in an attempt to cure the problem. In the 1991 Ryder Cup, Langer missed a five-foot putt that would have tied the Ryder Cup and allowed the European team to retain the trophy.

=== Senior career ===
In 2015, Langer became the first player since Arnold Palmer (1984–85) to win the Constellation Senior Players Championship in back-to-back years. It was also the last year that Langer was allowed to anchor the long putter, a technique which the USGA banned effective 1 January 2016. At the 2016 Masters, Langer was in the second to last group in the final round only two shots back, but fell to a tie for 24th.

In 2016, Langer claimed the Regions Tradition title for his sixth senior major championship. He won by a six-stroke margin over Olin Browne. This was his 100th professional win and the first time Langer had won the title. His capture of the 2017 Senior PGA Championship completed a career Grand Slam. The Regions Tradition title had also made him only the second golfer, after Jack Nicklaus, with wins in four different senior major championships. Later in 2016 he wrote history by becoming the first three-time winner of the Constellation Senior Players Championship and wins it for third straight year. The result also meant that only Nicklaus had won more senior majors than Langer. In November, he won his fourth Charles Schwab Cup and his third in a row.

Langer won three more senior majors in 2017 to become the most decorated player in the senior ranks of all time. In total, he won seven titles – but he did not win the season-ending Schwab Cup. Instead, Kevin Sutherland, who was fifth in the Order of Merit heading into the final event of the season, won that to lift the trophy in what was his only win of the season. Langer subsequently called the playoff process 'unfair'.

In November 2018, Langer won his fifth Charles Schwab Cup. This brought his lifetime earnings in the Charles Schwab Cup to $7,000,000.

In July 2019, Langer won his fourth Senior Open Championship at Royal Lytham & St. Annes Golf Club. This marked his eleventh victory in a senior major championship.

In March 2020, Langer won the Cologuard Classic for his 41st victory on the PGA Tour Champions.

In October 2021, Langer won the Dominion Energy Charity Classic in a playoff over Doug Barron. This made him the oldest man to win a PGA Tour Champions event at 64 years, 1 month and 27 days.

In November 2021, Langer won his sixth Charles Schwab Cup for the combined 2020–21 season. The Cup was awarded for play over two seasons due to the COVID-19 pandemic.

Langer's total career earnings through 2021 on the PGA Tour and PGA Tour Champions were more than US$42 million.

In February 2022, Langer won the Chubb Classic for the fourth time. At 64 years, 5 months, 23 days he broke his own record for oldest winner on the PGA Tour Champions and won for the 16th straight season. This win left him two behind Hale Irwin for the career PGA Tour Champions record. In November 2022, Langer won the TimberTech Championship for the third time. This was his first win as a 65-year-old and his 44th win on PGA Tour Champions.

In February 2023, Langer successfully defended his title at the Chubb Classic. This was his 45th win on the PGA Tour Champions, tying him with Hale Irwin. Langer birdied five of his last seven holes in the final round to shoot 65 and earn a three-stroke victory.

In July 2023, Langer won the U.S. Senior Open by two strokes over Steve Stricker at SentryWorld in Stevens Point, Wisconsin. This win put him ahead of Hale Irwin with a record 46 career titles on the PGA Tour Champions.

In November 2024, Langer won the Charles Schwab Cup Championship by one stroke over Steven Alker and Richard Green, also extending his age record and most wins on PGA Tour Champions.

== Personal life ==
Langer has been married to his American wife Vikki Carol since 1984. They have four children. They maintain homes in Langer's birthplace of Anhausen and in Boca Raton, Florida, US. Langer is known to be a devout Christian. A daughter is married to professional baseball player Chase De Jong.

In January 2017, US president Donald Trump used an incorrect story about Langer's failed attempt at voting in the United States to justify an investigation of voter fraud in the 2016 US presidential election. The story was covered in several media outlets. Since Langer is a citizen only of Germany, he was not eligible to vote.

== Awards and honors ==
- In 2001, Langer was elected to the World Golf Hall of Fame. He deferred his induction until 2002.
- In 2006, in recognition of his contribution to the sport of golf, Langer was appointed as an honorary Officer of the Most Excellent Order of the British Empire (OBE).
- In July 2016, he was inducted into Germany's Sport Hall of Fame.
- In his native Germany, Langer has received many other honors, including the Order of Merit of the Federal Republic of Germany and the Silver Laurel Leaf (Silbernes Lorbeerblatt), which is the highest German sport award.
- In September 2018, Langer received the Payne Stewart Award.

== Professional wins (126) ==
=== PGA Tour wins (3) ===
Legend
Major championships (2)
Other PGA Tour (1)

No.	Date	Tournament	Winning score	Margin of victory	Runner(s)-up
1	14 Apr 1985	Masters Tournament	−6 (72-74-68-68=282)	2 strokes	(Spain) Seve Ballesteros, (United States) Raymond Floyd, (United States) Curtis Strange
2	21 Apr 1985	Sea Pines Heritage	−11 (68-66-69-70=273)	Playoff	(United States) Bobby Wadkins
3	11 Apr 1993	Masters Tournament (2)	−11 (68-70-69-70=277)	4 strokes	(United States) Chip Beck

PGA Tour playoff record (1–2)

No.	Year	Tournament	Opponent(s)	Result
1	1985	Sea Pines Heritage	(United States) Bobby Wadkins	Won with par on first extra hole
2	1986	Shearson Lehman Brothers Andy Williams Open	(United States) Bob Tway	Lost to par on second extra hole
3	2007	Crowne Plaza Invitational at Colonial	(United States) Jim Furyk, (South Africa) Rory Sabbatini	Sabbatini won with birdie on first extra hole

=== European Tour wins (42) ===
Legend
Major championships (2)
Flagship events (2)
Tour Championships (2)
Other European Tour (36)

No.	Date	Tournament	Winning score	Margin of victory	Runner(s)-up
1	4 Oct 1980	Dunlop Masters	−14 (70-65-67-68=270)	5 strokes	(Scotland) Brian Barnes
2	2 Aug 1981	German Open	−12 (67-69-64-72=272)	1 stroke	(England) Tony Jacklin
3	27 Sep 1981	Bob Hope British Classic	−16 (67-65-68=200) (Note: Shortened to 36/54 holes due to weather.)	5 strokes	(England) Peter Oosterhuis
4	1 Aug 1982	Lufthansa German Open (2)	−9 (73-71-69-66=279)	Playoff	(Scotland) Bill Longmuir
5	1 May 1983	Italian Open	−17 (67-69-67-68=271)	Playoff	(Spain) Seve Ballesteros, (Scotland) Ken Brown
6	26 Jun 1983	Glasgow Golf Classic	−6 (70-66-66-72=274)	1 stroke	(Argentina) Vicente Fernández
7	18 Sep 1983	St. Mellion Timeshare TPC	−11 (69-68-66-66=269)	2 strokes	(England) Paul Way
8	20 May 1984	Peugeot Open de France	−18 (68-71-67-64=270)	1 stroke	(Spain) José Rivero
9	29 Jul 1984	KLM Dutch Open	−13 (64-68-69-74=275)	4 strokes	(Australia) Graham Marsh
10	5 Aug 1984	Carroll's Irish Open	−21 (68-66-67-66=267)	4 strokes	(England) Mark James
11	14 Oct 1984	Benson & Hedges Spanish Open	−13 (73-68-72-62=275)	2 strokes	(England) Howard Clark
12	14 Apr 1985	Masters Tournament	−6 (72-74-68-68=282)	2 strokes	(Spain) Seve Ballesteros, (United States) Raymond Floyd, (United States) Curtis Strange
13	25 Aug 1985	Lufthansa German Open (3)	−27 (61-60-62=183)	7 strokes	(England) Michael McLean, (Zimbabwe) Mark McNulty
14	1 Sep 1985	Panasonic European Open	−11 (66-72-64-67=269)	3 strokes	(Republic of Ireland) John O'Leary
15	31 Aug 1986	German Open (4)	−15 (75-65-66-67=273)	Playoff	(Australia) Rodger Davis
16	19 Oct 1986	Trophée Lancôme	−14 (67-69-68-70=274)	Shared title with (Spain) Seve Ballesteros (Note: Ballesteros and Langer agreed to share the 1986 Trophée Lancôme after failing light caused play to halt after four holes of a playoff.)	
17	25 May 1987	Whyte & Mackay PGA Championship	−18 (66-69-68-67=270)	4 strokes	(Spain) Seve Ballesteros
18	5 Jul 1987	Carroll's Irish Open (2)	−19 (67-68-66-68=269)	10 strokes	(Scotland) Sandy Lyle
19	8 May 1988	Epson Grand Prix of Europe Matchplay Championship	4 and 3		(Zimbabwe) Mark McNulty
20	30 Apr 1989	Peugeot Spanish Open (2)	−7 (70-72-67-72=281)	3 strokes	(Spain) José María Cañizares, (England) Paul Carrigill
21	8 Oct 1989	German Masters	−12 (67-71-70-68=276)	1 stroke	(Spain) José María Olazábal, (United States) Payne Stewart
22	22 Apr 1990	Cepsa Madrid Open	−18 (70-67-66-67=270)	1 stroke	(Australia) Rodger Davis
23	14 Oct 1990	Austrian Open	−17 (65-66-72-68=271)	Playoff	(United States) Lanny Wadkins
24	21 Apr 1991	Benson & Hedges International Open	−2 (73-68-75-70=286)	2 strokes	(Fiji) Vijay Singh
25	6 Oct 1991	Mercedes German Masters (2)	−13 (68-72-67-68=275)	Playoff	(Australia) Rodger Davis
26	26 Jul 1992	Heineken Dutch Open (2)	−11 (68-68-69-72=277)	Playoff	(Scotland) Gordon Brand Jnr
27	11 Oct 1992	Honda Open	−15 (69-65-70-69=273)	3 strokes	(Northern Ireland) Darren Clarke
28	11 Apr 1993	Masters Tournament (2)	−11 (68-70-69-70=277)	4 strokes	(United States) Chip Beck
29	31 May 1993	Volvo PGA Championship (2)	−14 (70-69-67-68=274)	6 strokes	(Scotland) Gordon Brand Jnr, (Scotland) Colin Montgomerie, (New Zealand) Frank Nobilo
30	29 Aug 1993	Volvo German Open (5)	−19 (65-68-70-66=269)	5 strokes	(Australia) Robert Allenby, (England) Peter Baker
31	3 Jul 1994	Murphy's Irish Open (3)	−13 (70-68-70-67=275)	1 stroke	(Australia) Robert Allenby, (United States) John Daly
32	30 Oct 1994	Volvo Masters	−8 (71-62-73-70=276)	1 stroke	(Spain) Seve Ballesteros, (Fiji) Vijay Singh
33	29 May 1995	Volvo PGA Championship (3)	−9 (67-73-68-71=279)	1 stroke	(New Zealand) Michael Campbell, (Sweden) Per-Ulrik Johansson
34	11 Jun 1995	Deutsche Bank Open TPC of Europe (2)	−18 (67-66-68-69=270)	6 strokes	(England) Jamie Spence
35	1 Oct 1995	Smurfit European Open (2)	−8 (74-70-68-68=280)	Playoff	(England) Barry Lane
36	4 May 1997	Conte of Florence Italian Open (2)	−15 (71-69-69-64=273)	1 stroke	(Spain) José María Olazábal
37	11 May 1997	Benson & Hedges International Open (2)	−12 (70-66-71-69=276)	2 strokes	(Wales) Ian Woosnam
38	10 Aug 1997	Chemapol Trophy Czech Open	−20 (70-67-64-63=264)	4 strokes	(Sweden) Niclas Fasth, (Spain) Ignacio Garrido, (Spain) Miguel Ángel Jiménez
39	5 Oct 1997	Linde German Masters (3)	−21 (68-69-60-70=267)	6 strokes	(Scotland) Colin Montgomerie
40	29 Jul 2001	TNT Dutch Open (3)	−15 (69-67-67-66=269)	Playoff	(England) Warren Bennett
41	7 Oct 2001	Linde German Masters (4)	−22 (67-64-68-67=266)	1 stroke	(United States) John Daly, (Sweden) Freddie Jacobson
42	10 Nov 2002	Volvo Masters Andalucía (2)	−3 (71-71-72-67=281)	Shared title with (Scotland) Colin Montgomerie (Note: Langer and Montgomerie agreed to share the 2002 Volvo Masters Andalucía after failing light caused play to halt after two holes of a playoff.)	

European Tour playoff record (8–6–2)

No.	Year	Tournament	Opponent(s)	Result
1	1982	Sun Alliance PGA Championship	(England) Tony Jacklin	Lost to birdie on first extra hole
2	1982	Lufthansa German Open	(Scotland) Bill Longmuir	Won with par on first extra hole
3	1983	Italian Open	(Spain) Seve Ballesteros, (Scotland) Ken Brown	Won with birdie on second extra hole Ballesteros eliminated by par on first hole
4	1985	Carroll's Irish Open	(Spain) Seve Ballesteros	Lost to birdie on second extra hole
5	1986	German Open	(Australia) Rodger Davis	Won with birdie on fifth extra hole
6	1986	Trophée Lancôme	(Spain) Seve Ballesteros	Playoff abandoned after four holes due to darkness; tournament shared
7	1987	German Masters	(Scotland) Sandy Lyle	Lost to par on second extra hole
8	1990	Peugeot Open de France	(Republic of Ireland) Philip Walton	Lost to par on second extra hole
9	1990	Austrian Open	(United States) Lanny Wadkins	Won with birdie on third extra hole
10	1991	Mercedes German Masters	(Australia) Rodger Davis	Won with par on first extra hole
11	1992	Heineken Dutch Open	(Scotland) Gordon Brand Jnr	Won with par on second extra hole
12	1992	BMW International Open	(United States) Paul Azinger, (United States) Glen Day, (Sweden) Anders Forsbrand, (England) Mark James	Azinger won with birdie on first extra hole
13	1995	Smurfit European Open	(England) Barry Lane	Won with birdie on second extra hole
14	1996	Peugeot Open de France	(Australia) Robert Allenby	Lost to birdie on first extra hole
15	2001	TNT Dutch Open	(England) Warren Bennett	Won with par on first extra hole
16	2002	Volvo Masters Andalucía	(Scotland) Colin Montgomerie	Playoff abandoned after two holes due to darkness; tournament shared

=== PGA of Japan Tour wins (1) ===
No.	Date	Tournament	Winning score	Margin of victory	Runner-up
1	27 Nov 1983	Casio World Open	−1 (74-68-74-71=287)	2 strokes	(Japan) Tsuneyuki Nakajima

PGA of Japan Tour playoff record (0–1)

No.	Year	Tournament	Opponent	Result
1	1984	Dunlop Phoenix Tournament	(United States) Scott Simpson	Lost to par on second extra hole

=== Asian PGA Tour wins (1) ===
No.	Date	Tournament	Winning score	Margin of victory	Runner-up
1	3 Nov 1996	Alfred Dunhill Masters^{1}	−17 (66-67-69-65=267)	2 strokes	(South Korea) Kang Wook-soon

^{1}Co-sanctioned by the PGA Tour of Australasia

=== Asia Golf Circuit wins (1) ===
No.	Date	Tournament	Winning score	Margin of victory	Runners-up
1	10 Feb 1991	Hutchison Telecom Hong Kong Open	−15 (65-72-69-63=269)	7 strokes	(South Korea) Choi Sang-ho, (Taiwan) Lu Wen-teh

=== PGA Tour of Australasia wins (2) ===
No.	Date	Tournament	Winning score	Margin of victory	Runner(s)-up
1	17 Feb 1985	Australian Masters	−11 (76-64-71-70=281)	3 strokes	(England) Nick Faldo, (Australia) Greg Norman
2	3 Nov 1996	Alfred Dunhill Masters^{1}	−17 (66-67-69-65=267)	2 strokes	(South Korea) Kang Wook-soon

^{1}Co-sanctioned by the Asian PGA Tour

=== South American Tour wins (2) ===
No.	Date	Tournament	Winning score	Margin of victory	Runner(s)-up
1	7 Dec 1980	Colombian Open	−9 (67-73-69-70=279)	6 strokes	(Brazil) Jaime Gonzalez, (United States) Mike White
2	16 Nov 1997	Argentine Masters	−7 (73-69-68-67=277)	1 stroke	(Argentina) Eduardo Romero

=== Other German wins (13) ===
- 1975 German National Open Championship
- 1977 German National Open Championship
- 1979 German National Open Championship, German PGA Championship
- 1984 German National Open Championship
- 1985 German National Open Championship
- 1986 German National Open Championship
- 1987 German National Open Championship
- 1988 German National Open Championship
- 1989 German National Open Championship
- 1990 German National Open Championship
- 1991 German National Open Championship
- 1992 German National Open Championship

Note: the German National Open Championship is a different event from the German Open listed five times in the European Tour wins section. That event was open to all comers, German and non-German. The German National Open Championship is "open" to German golfers whether they are amateur or professional.

=== Other wins (14) ===
Legend
World Golf Championships (1)
Other wins (13)

No.	Date	Tournament	Winning score	Margin of victory	Runner(s)-up
1	30 Sep 1979	Cacharel World Under-25 Championship	−14 (73-67-67-67=274)	17 strokes	(Canada) Jim Nelford, (Zimbabwe Rhodesia) Denis Watson
2	20 Mar 1981	BCA Tournament	−3 (70-67=137)	3 strokes	(England) Neil Coles
3	13 Nov 1983	Johnnie Walker Trophy	−18 (67-68-66-69=270)	2 strokes	(Scotland) Sandy Lyle
4	8 Dec 1985	Nedbank Million Dollar Challenge	−10 (69-70-68-71=278)	2 strokes	(United States) Lanny Wadkins
5	24 Nov 1990	World Cup (with (Germany) Torsten Giedeon)	−20 (141-142-132-141=556)	3 strokes	England − Richard Boxall and Mark James, Ireland − David Feherty and Ronan Rafferty
6	8 Dec 1991	Nedbank Million Dollar Challenge (2)	−16 (68-65-67-72=272)	5 strokes	(United States) Mark Calcavecchia
7	14 Nov 1993	World Cup of Golf Individual Trophy	−16 (69-68-66-69=272)	3 strokes	(United States) Fred Couples
8	4 Dec 2005	MBNA WorldPoints Father/Son Challenge (with son Stefan Langer)	−24 (59-61=120)	1 stroke	(United States) Raymond Floyd and son Robert Floyd
9	3 Dec 2006	Del Webb Father/Son Challenge (2) (with son Stefan Langer)	−24 (59-61=120)	1 stroke	(Fiji) Vijay Singh and son Qass Singh, (United States) Bob Tway and son Kevin Tway
10	10 Dec 2006	WGC-World Cup (2) (with (Germany) Marcel Siem)	−16 (65-69-68-66=268)	Playoff	Scotland − Colin Montgomerie and Marc Warren
11	14 Dec 2014	PNC Father-Son Challenge (3) (with son Jason Langer)	−23 (62-59=121)	2 strokes	(United States) Davis Love III and son Dru Love
12	8 Dec 2019	PNC Father-Son Challenge (4) (with son Jason Langer)	−24 (60-60=120)	Playoff	(South Africa) Retief Goosen and son Leo Goosen, (United States) Tom Lehman and son Thomas Lehman
13	17 Dec 2023	PNC Championship (5) (with son Jason Langer)	−25 (60-59=119)	2 strokes	(United States) David Duval and son Brady Duval
14	22 Dec 2024	PNC Championship (6) (with son Jason Langer)	−28 (59-57=116)	Playoff	(United States) Tiger Woods and son Charlie Woods

Other playoff record (3–0)

No.	Year	Tournament	Opponents	Result
1	2006	WGC-World Cup (with (Germany) Marcel Siem)	Scotland – Colin Montgomerie and Marc Warren	Won with par on first extra hole
2	2019	PNC Father-Son Challenge (with son Jason Langer)	(South Africa) Retief Goosen and son Leo Goosen, (United States) Tom Lehman and son Thomas Lehman	Won with eagle on first extra hole
3	2024	PNC Championship (with son Jason Langer)	(United States) Tiger Woods and son Charlie Woods	Won with eagle on first extra hole

=== PGA Tour Champions wins (47) ===
Legend
PGA Tour Champions major championships (12)
Charles Schwab Cup playoff events (5)
Other PGA Tour Champions (30)

No.	Date	Tournament	Winning score	Margin of victory	Runner(s)-up
1	14 Oct 2007	Administaff Small Business Classic	−25 (62-65-64=191)	8 strokes	(United States) Mark O'Meara
2	7 Mar 2008	Toshiba Classic	−14 (65-65-69=199)	Playoff	(United States) Jay Haas
3	30 Mar 2008	Ginn Championship Hammock Beach Resort	−12 (67-66-71=204)	8 strokes	(United States) Lonnie Nielsen, (United States) Tim Simpson
4	19 Oct 2008	Administaff Small Business Classic (2)	−12 (68-67-69=204)	2 strokes	(United States) Lonnie Nielsen
5	25 Jan 2009	Mitsubishi Electric Championship at Hualalai	−18 (64-66-68=198)	1 stroke	(United States) Andy Bean
6	26 Apr 2009	Liberty Mutual Legends of Golf (with (United States) Tom Lehman)	−27 (61-66-62=189)	Playoff	(United States) Jeff Sluman and (United States) Craig Stadler
7	7 Jun 2009	Triton Financial Classic	−15 (65-69-67=201)	6 strokes	(United States) Mark O'Meara
8	12 Jul 2009	3M Championship	−16 (67-68-65=200)	1 stroke	(United States) Andy Bean
9	21 Feb 2010	Allianz Championship	−17 (67-65-67=199)	Playoff	(United States) John Cook
10	18 Apr 2010	Outback Steakhouse Pro-Am	−9 (67-66=133)	1 stroke	(United States) Mark O'Meara, (United States) Mike Reid
11	25 Jul 2010	The Senior Open Championship	−5 (67-71-69-72=279)	1 stroke	(United States) Corey Pavin
12	1 Aug 2010	U.S. Senior Open	−8 (69-68-68-67=272)	3 strokes	(United States) Fred Couples
13	29 Aug 2010	Boeing Classic	−18 (66-63-69=198)	3 strokes	(Zimbabwe) Nick Price
14	20 Feb 2011	ACE Group Classic	−20 (64-66-66=196)	4 strokes	(United States) Fred Funk
15	5 Aug 2012	3M Championship (2)	−18 (67-69-62=198)	2 strokes	(United States) David Peoples
16	7 Oct 2012	SAS Championship	−13 (68-72-63=203)	2 strokes	(United States) Jay Don Blake
17	17 Feb 2013	ACE Group Classic (2)	−12 (62-70-72=204)	1 stroke	(United States) Jay Don Blake
18	21 Apr 2013	Greater Gwinnett Championship	−10 (73-66-67=206)	3 strokes	(United States) Tom Lehman, (United States) Tom Pernice Jr.
19	19 Jan 2014	Mitsubishi Electric Championship at Hualalai (2)	−22 (66-64-64=194)	3 strokes	(United States) Fred Couples, (United States) Jeff Sluman
20	4 May 2014	Insperity Invitational (3)	−11 (66-68-71=205)	1 stroke	(United States) Fred Couples
21	29 Jun 2014	Constellation Senior Players Championship	−15 (65-64-66-70=265)	Playoff	(United States) Jeff Sluman
22	27 Jul 2014	The Senior Open Championship (2)	−18 (65-66-68-67=266)	13 strokes	(Scotland) Colin Montgomerie
23	17 Aug 2014	Dick's Sporting Goods Open	−16 (67-67-66=200)	1 stroke	(United States) Woody Austin, (United States) Mark O'Meara
24	14 Jun 2015	Constellation Senior Players Championship (2)	−19 (65-65-67-68=265)	6 strokes	(United States) Kirk Triplett
25	18 Oct 2015	San Antonio Championship	−12 (71-68-65=204)	3 strokes	(United States) Scott Dunlap
26	14 Feb 2016	Chubb Classic (3)	−15 (62-66-73=201)	3 strokes	(United States) Fred Couples
27	22 May 2016	Regions Tradition	−17 (66-69-69-67=271)	6 strokes	(United States) Olin Browne
28	12 Jun 2016	Constellation Senior Players Championship (3)	+1 (71-68-69-73=281)	1 stroke	(United States) Joe Durant, (Spain) Miguel Ángel Jiménez
29	28 Aug 2016	Boeing Classic (2)	−13 (69-67-67=203)	Playoff	(United States) Woody Austin, (United States) Kevin Sutherland
30	21 Jan 2017	Mitsubishi Electric Championship at Hualalai (3)	−15 (64-65=129)	1 stroke	(United States) Fred Couples
31	21 May 2017	Regions Tradition (2)	−20 (69-69-66-64=268)	5 strokes	(United States) Scott Parel, (United States) Scott McCarron
32	28 May 2017	KitchenAid Senior PGA Championship	−18 (65-67-70-68=270)	1 stroke	(Fiji) Vijay Singh
33	30 Jul 2017	The Senior Open Championship (3)	−4 (69-74-65-72=280)	3 strokes	(United States) Corey Pavin
34	24 Sep 2017	PURE Insurance Championship	−17 (64-67-67=198)	3 strokes	(United States) Jerry Kelly
35	22 Oct 2017	Dominion Charity Classic	−16 (67-63-70=200)	1 stroke	(United States) Scott Verplank
36	29 Oct 2017	PowerShares QQQ Championship	−11 (69-69-67=205)	Playoff	(Spain) Miguel Ángel Jiménez
37	6 May 2018	Insperity Invitational (4)	−11 (63-72-70=205)	1 stroke	(United States) Bart Bryant, (United States) Paul Goydos, (United States) Jeff Maggert
38	14 Oct 2018	SAS Championship (2)	−22 (62-67-65=194)	6 strokes	(United States) Scott Parel
39	10 Feb 2019	Oasis Championship (2)	−19 (64-68-65=197)	5 strokes	(United States) Marco Dawson
40	28 Jul 2019	The Senior Open Championship (4)	−6 (71-67-70-66=274)	2 strokes	(England) Paul Broadhurst
41	1 Mar 2020	Cologuard Classic	−18 (68-68-65=201)	2 strokes	(United States) Woody Austin
42	24 Oct 2021	Dominion Energy Charity Classic (2)	−14 (66-67-69=202)	Playoff	(United States) Doug Barron
43	20 Feb 2022	Chubb Classic (4)	−16 (64-68-68=200)	3 strokes	(United States) Tim Petrovic
44	6 Nov 2022	TimberTech Championship (3)	−17 (70-63-66=199)	6 strokes	(United States) Paul Goydos, (Thailand) Thongchai Jaidee
45	19 Feb 2023	Chubb Classic (5)	−17 (64-70-65=199)	3 strokes	(Republic of Ireland) Pádraig Harrington, (United States) Steve Stricker
46	2 Jul 2023	U.S. Senior Open (2)	−7 (71-68-68-70=277)	2 strokes	(United States) Steve Stricker
47	10 Nov 2024	Charles Schwab Cup Championship	−18 (69-64-67-66=266)	1 stroke	(New Zealand) Steven Alker, (Australia) Richard Green

PGA Tour Champions playoff record (7–10)

No.	Year	Tournament	Opponent(s)	Result
1	2008	Toshiba Classic	(United States) Jay Haas	Won with birdie on seventh extra hole
2	2009	Liberty Mutual Legends of Golf (with (United States) Tom Lehman)	(United States) Jeff Sluman and (United States) Craig Stadler	Won with par on second extra hole
3	2010	Allianz Championship	(United States) John Cook	Won with eagle on first extra hole
4	2012	AT&T Championship	(South Africa) David Frost	Lost to birdie on second extra hole
5	2013	The Senior Open Championship	(United States) Mark Wiebe	Lost to par on fifth extra hole
6	2013	AT&T Championship	(United States) Kenny Perry	Lost to birdie on first extra hole
7	2014	Constellation Senior Players Championship	(United States) Jeff Sluman	Won with birdie on second extra hole
8	2015	Charles Schwab Cup Championship	(United States) Billy Andrade	Lost to birdie on first extra hole
9	2016	Boeing Classic	(United States) Woody Austin, (United States) Kevin Sutherland	Won with birdie on first extra hole
10	2017	PowerShares QQQ Championship	(Spain) Miguel Ángel Jiménez	Won with birdie on second extra hole
11	2018	Mitsubishi Electric Classic	(United States) Steve Flesch, (United States) Scott Parel	Flesch won with birdie on second extra hole Langer eliminated by birdie on first hole
12	2018	Bass Pro Shops Legends of Golf (with (United States) Tom Lehman)	(England) Paul Broadhurst and (United States) Kirk Triplett	Lost to birdie on first extra hole
13	2019	Chubb Classic	(United States) Olin Browne, (Spain) Miguel Ángel Jiménez	Jiménez won with par on first extra hole
14	2019	Invesco QQQ Championship	(Scotland) Colin Montgomerie	Lost to par on first extra hole
15	2020	Charles Schwab Series at Bass Pro Shops Big Cedar Lodge	(United States) Shane Bertsch, (United States) Glen Day, (United States) Kenny Perry	Bertsch won with eagle on first extra hole
16	2021	Dominion Energy Charity Classic	(United States) Doug Barron	Won with birdie on first extra hole
17	2024	Ascension Charity Classic	(South Korea) Yang Yong-eun	Lost to birdie on first extra hole

=== European Senior Tour wins (9) ===
Legend
Senior major championships (7)
Other European Senior Tour (2)

No.	Date	Tournament	Winning score	Margin of victory	Runner-up
1	7 Sep 2008	Casa Serena Open	−12 (67-67-67=201)	3 strokes	(Wales) Ian Woosnam
2	25 Jul 2010	The Senior Open Championship	−5 (67-71-69-72=279)	1 stroke	(United States) Corey Pavin
3	1 Aug 2010	U.S. Senior Open	−8 (69-68-68-67=272)	3 strokes	(United States) Fred Couples
4	27 Jul 2014	The Senior Open Championship (2)	−18 (65-66-68-67=266)	13 strokes	(Scotland) Colin Montgomerie
5	28 May 2017	KitchenAid Senior PGA Championship	−18 (65-67-70-68=270)	1 stroke	(Fiji) Vijay Singh
6	30 Jul 2017	The Senior Open Championship (3)	−4 (69-74-65-72=280)	3 strokes	(United States) Corey Pavin
7	28 Jul 2019	The Senior Open Championship (4)	−6 (71-67-70-66=274)	2 strokes	(England) Paul Broadhurst
8	2 Jul 2023	U.S. Senior Open (2)	−7 (71-68-68-70=277)	2 strokes	(United States) Steve Stricker
9	28 Sep 2025	WINSTONgolf Senior Open	−21 (62-67-66=195)	6 strokes	(Sweden) Patrik Sjöland

European Senior Tour playoff record (0–2)

No.	Year	Tournament	Opponent	Result
1	2013	The Senior Open Championship	(United States) Mark Wiebe	Lost to par on fifth extra hole
2	2014	WINSTONgolf Senior Open	(England) Philip Golding, (England) Paul Wesselingh	Wesselingh won with birdie on third extra hole Golding eliminated by par on second hole

=== Other senior wins (1) ===
No.	Date	Tournament	Winning score	Margin of victory	Runner-up
1	1 Dec 2012	Nedbank Champions Challenge	−7 (68-67-74=209)	2 strokes	(United States) Jay Haas

== Major championships ==
=== Wins (2) ===
Year	Championship	54 holes	Winning score	Margin	Runner(s)-up
1985	Masters Tournament	2 shot deficit	−6 (72-74-68-68=282)	2 strokes	(Spain) Seve Ballesteros, (United States) Raymond Floyd, (United States) Curtis Strange
1993	Masters Tournament (2)	4 shot lead	−11 (68-70-69-70=277)	4 strokes	(United States) Chip Beck

=== Results timeline ===
Results not in chronological order in 2020.

Tournament	1976	1977	1978	1979
Masters Tournament				
U.S. Open				
The Open Championship	CUT		CUT	
PGA Championship				

Tournament	1980	1981	1982	1983	1984	1985	1986	1987	1988	1989
Masters Tournament			CUT		T31	1	T16	T7	T9	T26
U.S. Open			CUT			CUT	T8	T4	CUT	T59
The Open Championship	T51	2	T13	T56	T2	T3	T3	T17	69	80
PGA Championship						T32	CUT	T21	CUT	T61

Tournament	1990	1991	1992	1993	1994	1995	1996	1997	1998	1999
Masters Tournament	T7	T32	T31	1	T25	T31	T36	T7	T39	T11
U.S. Open	CUT	CUT	T23	CUT	T23	T36	DQ	CUT	CUT	
The Open Championship	T48	T9	T59	3	T60	T24	WD	T38	CUT	T18
PGA Championship	CUT	CUT	T40	CUT	T25		76	T23		T61

Tournament	2000	2001	2002	2003	2004	2005	2006	2007	2008	2009
Masters Tournament	T28	T6	T32	CUT	T4	T20	CUT	CUT	CUT	CUT
U.S. Open	CUT	T40	T35	T42		T33				
The Open Championship	T11	T3	T28	CUT		T5	CUT			
PGA Championship	T46	CUT	T23	T57	T66	T47	CUT			

Tournament	2010	2011	2012	2013	2014	2015	2016	2017	2018
Masters Tournament	CUT		CUT	T25	T8	CUT	T24	CUT	T38
U.S. Open									
The Open Championship		CUT				T78			T24
PGA Championship									

Tournament	2019	2020	2021	2022	2023	2024	2025
Masters Tournament	T62	T29	CUT	CUT	CUT		CUT
PGA Championship							
U.S. Open							
The Open Championship		NT					

Win
Top 10
Did not play

WD = Withdrew
DQ = Disqualified
CUT = missed the halfway cut
"T" indicates a tie for a place.
NT = No tournament due to COVID-19 pandemic

=== Summary ===
Tournament	Wins	2nd	3rd	Top-5	Top-10	Top-25	Events	Cuts made
Masters Tournament	2	0	0	3	9	15	41	27
PGA Championship	0	0	0	0	0	4	20	13
U.S. Open	0	0	0	1	2	4	20	10
The Open Championship	0	2	4	7	8	14	31	24
Totals	2	2	4	11	19	37	112	74

- Most consecutive cuts made – 8 (1994 Masters – 1996 Masters)
- Longest streak of top-10s – 2 (three times)

== Results in The Players Championship ==
Tournament	1984	1985	1986	1987	1988	1989
The Players Championship	T29	T7	T40	T24	T16	T67

Tournament	1990	1991	1992	1993	1994	1995	1996	1997	1998	1999
The Players Championship		T6	T29	2	T27	2		T31	CUT	T38

Tournament	2000	2001	2002	2003	2004	2005	2006	2007	2008	2009
The Players Championship	T42	3	T22	T48	T77	CUT	T58	T58	T15	

Tournament	2010	2011	2012	2013	2014	2015	2016	2017
The Players Championship						CUT	CUT	CUT

Top 10
Did not play

CUT = missed the halfway cut
"T" indicates a tie for a place

== Results in World Golf Championships ==
Tournament	1999	2000	2001	2002	2003	2004	2005	2006
Match Play	R16	R64	R64	R64	R64			R32
Championship	T48	T35	NT^{1}	T33				
Invitational			T11	T38	T11	T61		

^{1}Cancelled due to 9/11

Top 10
Did not play

QF, R16, R32, R64 = Round in which player lost in match play
"T" = Tied
NT = No tournament

== Senior major championships ==
=== Wins (12) ===
Year	Championship	54 holes	Winning score	Margin	Runner(s)-up
2010	The Senior Open Championship	3 shot lead	−5 (67-71-69-72=279)	1 stroke	(United States) Corey Pavin
2010	U.S. Senior Open	Tied for lead	−8 (69-68-68-67=272)	3 strokes	(United States) Fred Couples
2014	Constellation Senior Players Championship	3 shot lead	−15 (65-64-66-70=265)	Playoff	(United States) Jeff Sluman
2014	The Senior Open Championship (2)	8 shot lead	−18 (65-66-68-67=266)	13 strokes	(Scotland) Colin Montgomerie
2015	Constellation Senior Players Championship (2)	8 shot lead	−19 (65-65-67-68=265)	6 strokes	(United States) Kirk Triplett
2016	Regions Tradition	4 shot lead	−17 (66-69-69-67=271)	6 strokes	(United States) Olin Browne
2016	Constellation Senior Players Championship (3)	3 shot lead	+1 (71-68-69-73=281)	1 stroke	(United States) Joe Durant, (Spain) Miguel Ángel Jiménez
2017	Regions Tradition (2)	2 shot deficit	−20 (69-69-66-64=268)	5 strokes	(United States) Scott Parel, (United States) Scott McCarron
2017	KitchenAid Senior PGA Championship	1 shot deficit	−18 (65-67-70-68=270)	1 stroke	(Fiji) Vijay Singh
2017	The Senior Open Championship (3)	4 shot lead	−4 (69-74-65-72=280)	3 strokes	(United States) Corey Pavin
2019	The Senior Open Championship (4)	3 shot deficit	−6 (71-67-70-66=274)	2 strokes	(England) Paul Broadhurst
2023	U.S. Senior Open (2)	2 shot lead	−7 (71-68-68-70=277)	2 strokes	(United States) Steve Stricker

=== Results timeline ===
Results are not in chronological order.

Tournament	2007	2008	2009	2010	2011	2012	2013	2014	2015	2016	2017	2018	2019	2020	2021	2022	2023	2024	2025	2026
Senior PGA Championship	–	2	T17	T23		T4	T13	T3	6	T3	1		T12	NT	T50	3	T20	T34		T36
The Tradition	–	T7	T17	T10		T2	T10	T9	T5	1	1	11	T6	NT	T6		T18	T8	T27	T35
U.S. Senior Open	–	T6	T22	1	T9	T2	T14	T9	T3	T11	T18	T16	T24	NT	T5	CUT	1	T42	CUT	
Senior Players Championship	T13	T7	T5	T9	T6		8	1	1	1	T2	T17	T34	T10	T20	T25	6		67	T20
The Senior Open Championship	–	4	4	1	T12	T6	2	1	2	T9	1	2	1	NT	4	T12	T7	T5	T24	

Win
Top 10
Did not play

CUT = missed the halfway cut
"T" indicates a tie for a place
NT = no tournament due to COVID-19 pandemic

== Team appearances ==
- World Cup (representing Germany): 1976, 1977, 1978, 1979, 1980, 1990 (winners), 1991, 1992, 1993 (individual winner), 1994, 1996, 2006 (winners)
- Ryder Cup (representing Europe): 1981, 1983, 1985 (winners), 1987 (winners), 1989 (tied – retained trophy), 1991, 1993, 1995 (winners), 1997 (winners), 2002 (winners), 2004 (non-playing captain – winners)
- Hennessy Cognac Cup (representing the Continent of Europe): 1976, 1978, 1980, 1982 (captain)
- Four Tours World Championship (representing Europe): 1985 (captain), 1986 (captain), 1987 (captain), 1989 (captain), 1990
- Alfred Dunhill Cup (representing Germany): 1992, 1994, 2000
- Seve Trophy (representing Continental Europe): 2000 (winners)
- UBS Cup (representing the Rest of the World): 2001, 2002, 2003 (tie), 2004
- Wendy's 3-Tour Challenge (representing Champions Tour): 2010, 2012, 2013

== Film ==
In 2025, the film documentary Bernhard Langer – The Eternal Champion was released, which retells Langer's career and life.

== See also ==
- List of golfers with most European Tour wins
- List of golfers with most PGA Tour Champions wins
- List of golfers with most European Senior Tour wins
