= 2016 PGA Tour Champions season =

Golf tour season

- Duration: January 21, 2016 – November 13, 2016
- Number of official events: 26
- Most wins: (Germany) Bernhard Langer (4)
- Charles Schwab Cup: (Germany) Bernhard Langer
- Money list: (Germany) Bernhard Langer
- Player of the Year: (Germany) Bernhard Langer
- Rookie of the Year: (England) Paul Broadhurst

The 2016 PGA Tour Champions season was the 37th season of PGA Tour Champions (formerly the Senior PGA Tour and the Champions Tour), the main professional golf tour in the United States for men aged 50 and over.

== Changes for 2016 ==
The 2016 season saw the introduction of a playoff system to determine the winner of the Charles Schwab Cup, with the tour being rebranded as PGA Tour Champions. The playoffs, similar to that used by the regular PGA Tour for the FedEx Cup, consisted of three events and ended with the season-ending Charles Schwab Cup Championship.

== Schedule ==
The following table lists official events during the 2016 season.

Date	Tournament	Location	Purse (US$)	Winner (Note: The number in parentheses after each winner's name is the number of PGA Tour Champions events they had won up to and including that tournament. This information is only shown for PGA Tour Champions members.)	Notes
Jan 23	Mitsubishi Electric Championship at Hualalai	Hawaii	1,800,000	(United States) Duffy Waldorf (2)	
Feb 7	Allianz Championship	Florida	1,750,000	(Mexico) Esteban Toledo (4)	
Feb 14	Chubb Classic	Florida	1,600,000	(Germany) Bernhard Langer (26)	
Mar 20	Tucson Conquistadores Classic	Arizona	1,700,000	(United States) Woody Austin (1)	
Apr 3	Mississippi Gulf Resort Classic	Mississippi	1,600,000	(Spain) Miguel Ángel Jiménez (3)	
Apr 17	Mitsubishi Electric Classic	Georgia	1,800,000	(United States) Woody Austin (2)	
Apr 24	Bass Pro Shops Legends of Golf	Missouri	2,400,000	(United States) Michael Allen (8) and (United States) Woody Austin (3)	Team event
May 8	Insperity Invitational	Texas	2,100,000	(Sweden) Jesper Parnevik (1)	
May 22	Regions Tradition	Alabama	2,300,000	(Germany) Bernhard Langer (27)	PGA Tour Champions major championship
May 29	Senior PGA Championship	Michigan	2,800,000	(United States) Rocco Mediate (3)	Senior major championship
Jun 5	Principal Charity Classic	Iowa	1,750,000	(United States) Scott McCarron (1)	
Jun 12	Constellation Senior Players Championship	Pennsylvania	2,800,000	(Germany) Bernhard Langer (28)	PGA Tour Champions major championship
Jun 26	American Family Insurance Championship	Wisconsin	2,000,000	(United States) Kirk Triplett (5)	New tournament
Jul 10	Dick's Sporting Goods Open	New York	2,000,000	(United States) Paul Goydos (3)	
Jul 24	The Senior Open Championship	Scotland	£1,350,000	(England) Paul Broadhurst (1)	Senior major championship
Aug 7	3M Championship	Minnesota	1,750,000	(United States) Joe Durant (2)	
Aug 14	U.S. Senior Open	Ohio	3,750,000	(United States) Gene Sauers (1)	Senior major championship
Aug 28	Boeing Classic	Washington	2,000,000	(Germany) Bernhard Langer (29)	
Sep 4	Shaw Charity Classic	Canada	2,350,000	(Paraguay) Carlos Franco (1)	
Sep 18	Nature Valley First Tee Open at Pebble Beach	California	2,000,000	(England) Paul Broadhurst (2)	
Sep 25	Pacific Links Bear Mountain Championship	Canada	2,500,000	(Scotland) Colin Montgomerie (4)	
Oct 9	Toshiba Classic	California	1,800,000	(United States) Jay Haas (18)	
Oct 16	SAS Championship	North Carolina	2,100,000	(United States) Doug Garwood (1)	
Oct 30	PowerShares QQQ Championship	California	2,000,000	(United States) Tom Pernice Jr. (5)	New tournament Charles Schwab Cup playoff event
Nov 6	Dominion Charity Classic	Virginia	2,000,000	(United States) Scott McCarron (2)	New tournament Charles Schwab Cup playoff event
Nov 13	Charles Schwab Cup Championship	Arizona	2,000,000	(United States) Paul Goydos (4)	Charles Schwab Cup playoff event

=== Unofficial events ===
The following events were sanctioned by PGA Tour Champions, but did not carry official money, nor were wins official.

Date	Tournament	Location	Purse ($)	Winners	Notes
Dec 11	PNC Father-Son Challenge	Florida	1,085,000	(United States) David Duval and stepson Nick Karavites	Team event

== Charles Schwab Cup ==
The Charles Schwab Cup was based on tournament results during the season, calculated using a points-based system.

Position	Player	Points
1	(Germany) Bernhard Langer	3,200
2	(Scotland) Colin Montgomerie	2,400
3	(United States) Paul Goydos	2,216
4	(United States) Scott McCarron	2,004
5	(United States) Joe Durant	1,658

== Money list ==
The money list was based on prize money won during the season, calculated in U.S. dollars.

Position	Player	Prize money ($)
1	(Germany) Bernhard Langer	3,016,959
2	(Scotland) Colin Montgomerie	1,723,318
3	(United States) Joe Durant	1,635,147
4	(Spain) Miguel Ángel Jiménez	1,613,820
5	(United States) Scott McCarron	1,562,802

== Awards ==
Award	Winner	Ref.
Player of the Year (Jack Nicklaus Trophy)	(Germany) Bernhard Langer	
Rookie of the Year	(England) Paul Broadhurst	
Scoring leader (Byron Nelson Award)	(Germany) Bernhard Langer	
