= Scott Parel =

American golfer (born 1965)

Personal information
- Nationality: United States
- Born: May 15, 1965 (age 61) Pontiac, Michigan, U.S.
- Height: 5 ft 5 in (1.65 m)
- Weight: 160 lb (73 kg; 11 st)
- Spouse: Mary
- Children: 2

Career
- Sport: Golf
- College: University of Georgia
- Turned professional: 1996
- Current tour: PGA Tour Champions
- Former tours: Web.com Tour; Tarheel Tour
- Professional wins: 8

Number of wins by tour
- Korn Ferry Tour: 1
- PGA Tour Champions: 4
- Other: 3

Best results in major championships
- Masters Tournament: DNP
- PGA Championship: DNP
- U.S. Open: CUT: 2002, 2005
- The Open Championship: DNP

Scott Parel (born May 15, 1965) is an American professional golfer.

== Early life and amateur career ==
Parel was born in Pontiac, Michigan. He graduated from the University of Georgia but did not play college golf. He worked for 10 years as a computer programmer and database administrator after college.

== Professional career ==
In 1996, at the age of 31, Parel turned pro. Parel played on the Web.com Tour in 2003, 2005–09, and 2012–15. He won his first title at the 2013 Air Capital Classic.

Parel has played only five PGA Tour events, making the cut only once: a T-57 at 2006 BellSouth Classic. He qualified for the U.S. Open twice, in 2002 and 2005.

=== Senior career ===
In August 2018, Parel won on the PGA Tour Champions by winning the Boeing Classic.

In October 2018, Parel won for the second time on the PGA Tour Champions, winning the Invesco QQQ Championship at Sherwood Country Club in Lake Sherwood, California.

In November 2018, Parel finished third in the season-long Charles Schwab Cup, earning a $300,000 bonus.

On April 1, 2019, Parel lost a seven-hole playoff at the Rapiscan Systems Classic in Mississippi to Kevin Sutherland. The playoff was held over two days because play had to be suspended on Sunday March 31, 2019 due to darkness. Sutherland and Parel faced off in a playoff again in June 2019 at the Principal Charity Classic with Sutherland winning on the second extra hole.

In February 2020, Parel overcame a three-shot deficit Sunday and closed with an 8-under 63 to win the Chubb Classic by two shots over Bob Estes, his third career victory on the PGA Tour Champions to surpass $5 million for his career.

== Professional wins (8) ==
=== Web.com Tour wins (1) ===
No.	Date	Tournament	Winning score	Margin of victory	Runner-up
1	Jun 16, 2013	Air Capital Classic	−18 (69-66-67-64=266)	3 strokes	(United States) Alex Aragon

Web.com Tour playoff record (0–1)

No.	Year	Tournament	Opponent	Result
1	2012	Rex Hospital Open	(United States) James Hahn	Lost to birdie on second extra hole

=== Tarheel Tour wins (2) ===
No.	Date	Tournament	Winning score	Margin of victory	Runner-up
1	May 13, 2004	Eagle Chase Classic	−15 (69-67-65=201)	Playoff	(United States) Chris Patton
2	Oct 7, 2004	Fox Den Open	−19 (66-65-66=197)	2 strokes	(United States) Braxton Wynns

=== PGA Tour Champions wins (4) ===
Legend
Charles Schwab Cup playoff events (1)
Other PGA Tour Champions (3)

No.	Date	Tournament	Winning score	Margin of victory	Runner(s)-up
1	Aug 26, 2018	Boeing Classic	−18 (65-70-63=198)	3 strokes	(United States) Kevin Sutherland
2	Oct 28, 2018	Invesco QQQ Championship	−11 (67-70-68=205)	1 stroke	(United States) Paul Goydos
3	Feb 16, 2020	Chubb Classic	−17 (64-69-63=196)	2 strokes	(United States) Bob Estes
4	Apr 24, 2022	ClubCorp Classic	−11 (67-70-65=202)	Playoff	(New Zealand) Steven Alker, (United States) Gene Sauers

PGA Tour Champions playoff record (1–3)

No.	Year	Tournament	Opponent(s)	Result
1	2018	Mitsubishi Electric Classic	(United States) Steve Flesch, (Germany) Bernhard Langer	Flesch won with birdie on second extra hole Langer eliminated by birdie on first hole
2	2019	Rapiscan Systems Classic	(United States) Kevin Sutherland	Lost to birdie on seventh extra hole
3	2019	Principal Charity Classic	(United States) Kevin Sutherland	Lost to birdie on second extra hole
4	2022	ClubCorp Classic	(New Zealand) Steven Alker, (United States) Gene Sauers	Won with par on first extra hole

=== Other wins (1) ===
- 2018 Diamond Resorts Invitational

== Results in major championships ==
Tournament	2002	2003	2004	2005
U.S. Open	CUT			CUT

Did not play

CUT = missed the halfway cut
Note: Parel only played in the U.S. Open.

== Results in senior major championships ==
Results not in chronological order

Tournament	2016	2017	2018	2019	2020	2021	2022	2023	2024	2025	2026
Senior PGA Championship	T7	T15	T45	6	NT	T68	T66	CUT	T72	T35	CUT
The Tradition		T2	T34	T16	NT	T15	T36	T18	T60	T27	T30
U.S. Senior Open		T35	T16	T24	NT	T46	T28	CUT	CUT	T36	T51
Senior Players Championship	T67	T35	T6	T4	2	T20	T22	T9	T72		T48
Senior British Open Championship	T44		T43	T24	NT	T35	T20	T61	T49		CUT

Top 10
Did not play

CUT = missed the halfway cut
"T" indicates a tie for a place
NT = no tournament due to COVID-19 pandemic
