= 2012 Champions Tour =

Golf tour season

2012 Champions Tour season
- Duration: January 20, 2012 – November 4, 2012
- Number of official events: 24
- Most wins: (United States) Michael Allen (2) (England) Roger Chapman (2) (United States) Fred Couples (2) (South Africa) David Frost (2) (United States) Fred Funk (2) (Germany) Bernhard Langer (2) (United States) Tom Lehman (2) (United States) Willie Wood (2)
- Charles Schwab Cup: (United States) Tom Lehman
- Money list: (Germany) Bernhard Langer
- Player of the Year: (United States) Tom Lehman
- Rookie of the Year: (United States) Kirk Triplett

The 2012 Champions Tour was the 33rd season of the Champions Tour (formerly the Senior PGA Tour), the main professional golf tour in the United States for men aged 50 and over.

== Changes for 2012 ==
Two of the Champions Tour major championships; the Regions Tradition and the Constellation Senior Players Championship saw changes in dates on the schedule from 2011. The Regions Tradition was moved from June to May, with the Constellation Senior Players Championship was moved from the fall season to being played in June/July.

== Schedule ==
The following table lists official events during the 2012 season.

Date	Tournament	Location	Purse (US$)	Winner (Note: The number in parentheses after each winner's name is the number of Champions Tour events they had won up to and including that tournament. This information is only shown for Champions Tour members.)	Notes
Jan 22	Mitsubishi Electric Championship at Hualalai	Hawaii	1,800,000	(United States) Dan Forsman (3)	
Feb 12	Allianz Championship	Florida	1,800,000	(United States) Corey Pavin (1)	
Feb 19	ACE Group Classic	Florida	1,600,000	(United States) Kenny Perry (2)	
Mar 18	Toshiba Classic	California	1,750,000	(United States) Loren Roberts (13)	
Mar 25	Mississippi Gulf Resort Classic	Mississippi	1,600,000	(United States) Fred Couples (7)	
Apr 15	Encompass Insurance Pro-Am of Tampa Bay	Florida	1,600,000	(United States) Michael Allen (2)	Pro-Am
Apr 22	Liberty Mutual Insurance Legends of Golf	Georgia	2,700,000	(United States) Michael Allen (3) and (South Africa) David Frost (2)	Team event
May 6	Insperity Championship	Texas	1,700,000	(United States) Fred Funk (7)	
May 27	Senior PGA Championship	Michigan	2,000,000	(England) Roger Chapman (1)	Senior major championship
Jun 3	Principal Charity Classic	Iowa	1,750,000	(United States) Jay Haas (16)	
Jun 10	Regions Tradition	Alabama	2,200,000	(United States) Tom Lehman (6)	Champions Tour major championship
Jun 24	Montreal Championship	Canada	1,800,000	(United States) Mark Calcavecchia (2)	
Jul 1	Constellation Senior Players Championship	Pennsylvania	2,700,000	(United States) Joe Daley (1)	Champions Tour major championship
Jul 8	Nature Valley First Tee Open at Pebble Beach	California	1,700,000	(United States) Kirk Triplett (1)	
Jul 15	U.S. Senior Open	Michigan	2,600,000	(England) Roger Chapman (2)	Senior major championship
Jul 29	The Senior Open Championship	Scotland	2,000,000	(United States) Fred Couples (8)	Senior major championship
Aug 5	3M Championship	Minnesota	1,750,000	(Germany) Bernhard Langer (15)	
Aug 19	Dick's Sporting Goods Open	New York	1,800,000	(United States) Willie Wood (1)	
Aug 26	Boeing Classic	Washington	2,000,000	(United States) Jay Don Blake (3)	
Sep 16	Pacific Links Hawai'i Championship	Hawaii	1,800,000	(United States) Willie Wood (2)	New tournament
Oct 7	SAS Championship	North Carolina	2,100,000	(Germany) Bernhard Langer (16)	
Oct 14	Greater Hickory Classic at Rock Barn	North Carolina	1,600,000	(United States) Fred Funk (8)	
Oct 28	AT&T Championship	Texas	1,850,000	(South Africa) David Frost (3)	
Nov 4	Charles Schwab Cup Championship	Arizona	2,500,000	(United States) Tom Lehman (7)	Tour Championship

=== Unofficial events ===
The following events were sanctioned by the Champions Tour, but did not carry official money, nor were wins official.

Date	Tournament	Location	Purse ($)	Winners	Notes
Dec 16	PNC Father-Son Challenge	Florida	1,085,000	(United States) Davis Love III and son Dru Love	Team event

== Charles Schwab Cup ==
The Charles Schwab Cup was based on tournament results during the season, calculated using a points-based system.

Position	Player	Points
1	(United States) Tom Lehman	3,082
2	(Germany) Bernhard Langer	2,647
3	(United States) Fred Couples	1,846
4	(England) Roger Chapman	1,806
5	(United States) Fred Funk	1,405

== Money list ==
The money list was based on prize money won during the season, calculated in U.S. dollars.

Position	Player	Prize money ($)
1	(Germany) Bernhard Langer	2,140,296
2	(United States) Tom Lehman	1,982,575
3	(United States) Michael Allen	1,686,488
4	(United States) Fred Funk	1,427,937
5	(United States) Jay Don Blake	1,378,180

== Awards ==
Award	Winner	Ref.
Player of the Year (Jack Nicklaus Trophy)	(United States) Tom Lehman	
Rookie of the Year	(United States) Kirk Triplett	
Scoring leader (Byron Nelson Award)	(United States) Fred Couples	
