= 2008 BMW PGA Championship =

Tournament information
- Dates: 22–25 May 2008
- Location: Virginia Water, Surrey, England; 51.40°N 0.59°W
- Courses: Wentworth Club; West Course
- Tour: European Tour

Statistics
- Par: 72
- Length: 7,304 yards (6,679 m)
- Field: 150 players, 70 after cut
- Cut: 145 (+1)
- Prize fund: €4,500,000
- Winner's share: €750,000

Champion
- (Spain) Miguel Ángel Jiménez
- 277 (−11)

Location map
- Location in England Location in Surrey

The 2008 BMW PGA Championship was the 54th edition of the BMW PGA Championship, an annual professional golf tournament on the European Tour. It was held 22–25 May at the West Course of Wentworth Club in Virginia Water, Surrey, England, a suburb southwest of London.

Spaniard Miguel Ángel Jiménez defeated Englishman Oliver Wilson in a playoff to capture his first BMW PGA Championship title.

== Course layout ==
Wentworth Club, West Course
Tee	Rating/Slope	1	2	3	4	5	6	7	8	9	Out	10	11	12	13	14	15	16	17	18	In	Total
Yardage	n/a	474	154	465	552	203	418	396	392	449	3,503	184	416	531	470	179	489	383	610	539	3,801	7,304
Par		4	3	4	5	3	4	4	4	4	35	3	4	5	4	3	4	4	5	5	37	72

== Round summaries ==
=== First round ===
Thursday, 22 May 2008

Place	Player	Score	To par
1	(Republic of Ireland) Paul McGinley	65	−7
2	(Sweden) Robert Karlsson	66	−6
T3	(Australia) Marcus Fraser	67	−5
T3	(South Africa) Louis Oosthuizen	67	−5
T5	(Wales) Garry Houston	68	−4
T5	(South Africa) Charl Schwartzel	68	−4
T5	(Argentina) Daniel Vancsik	68	−4
T5	(England) Simon Wakefield	68	−4
T9	(France) Mike Lorenzo-Vera	69	−3
T9	(Spain) Álvaro Velasco	69	−3
T9	(Scotland) Marc Warren	69	−3

=== Second round ===
Friday, 23 May 2008

Place	Player	Score	To par
1	(Republic of Ireland) Paul McGinley	65-66=131	−13
T2	(Sweden) Robert Karlsson	66-69=135	−9
T2	(England) Miles Tunnicliff	70-65=135	−9
T4	(Australia) Marcus Fraser	67-69=136	−8
T4	(Denmark) Søren Kjeldsen	71-65=136	−8
T4	(England) Oliver Wilson	70-66=136	−8
7	(Spain) Miguel Ángel Jiménez	70-67=137	−7
T8	(Chile) Felipe Aguilar	71-67=138	−6
T8	(Spain) Alejandro Cañizares	72-66=138	−6
T8	(Republic of Ireland) Damien McGrane	72-66=138	−6
T8	(Scotland) Gary Orr	70-68=138	−6
T8	(Argentina) Daniel Vancsik	68-70=138	−6

=== Third round ===
Saturday, 24 May 2008

Place	Player	Score	To par
1	(Sweden) Robert Karlsson	66-69-70=205	−11
T2	(Spain) Miguel Ángel Jiménez	70-67-72=209	−7
T2	(England) Oliver Wilson	70-66-73=209	−7
T4	(Republic of Ireland) Paul McGinley	65-66-79=210	−6
T4	(India) Jyoti Randhawa	73-68-69=210	−6
T4	(Argentina) Daniel Vancsik	68-70-72=210	−6
T7	(Argentina) Rafael Echenique	70-73-68=211	−5
T7	(Scotland) Gary Orr	70-68-73=211	−5
T9	(Chile) Felipe Aguilar	71-67-74=212	−4
T9	(Spain) Alejandro Cañizares	72-66-74=212	−4
T9	(England) Paul Casey	71-68-73=212	−4
T9	(Australia) Marcus Fraser	67-69-76=212	−4
T9	(Australia) Richard Green	70-69-73=212	−4
T9	(Germany) Martin Kaymer	71-70-71=212	−4
T9	(Denmark) Søren Kjeldsen	71-65-76=212	−4
T9	(South Africa) Charl Schwartzel	68-71-73=212	−4
T9	(England) Miles Tunnicliff	70-65-77=212	−4

=== Final round ===
Sunday, 25 May 2008

Place	Player	Score	To par	Money (€)
T1	(Spain) Miguel Ángel Jiménez	70-67-72-68=277	−11	Playoff
T1	(England) Oliver Wilson	70-66-73-68=277	−11	Playoff
T3	(England) Luke Donald	72-69-73-65=279	−9	253,350
T3	(Sweden) Robert Karlsson	66-69-70-74=279	−9	253,350
5	(India) Jyoti Randhawa	73-68-69-70=280	−8	190,800
T6	(South Africa) Retief Goosen	76-69-70-66=281	−7	126,450
T6	(Australia) Richard Green	70-69-73-69=281	−7	126,450
T6	(Sweden) Alex Norén	75-68-71-67=281	−7	126,450
T6	(Argentina) Andrés Romero	72-69-73-67=281	−7	126,450
T10	(Spain) Alejandro Cañizares	72-66-74-70=282	−6	76,275
T10	(England) Paul Casey	71-68-73-70=282	−6	76,275
T10	(England) Simon Khan	71-71-71-69=282	−6	76,275
T10	(Denmark) Søren Kjeldsen	71-65-76-70=282	−6	76,275
T10	(Republic of Ireland) Paul McGinley	65-66-79-72=282	−6	76,275
T10	(England) Steve Webster	71-70-72-69=282	−6	76,275

==== Scorecard ====
Hole	1	2	3	4	5	6	7	8	9	10	11	12	13	14	15	16	17	18
Par	4	3	4	5	3	4	4	4	4	3	4	5	4	3	4	4	5	5
(Spain) Jiménez	−7	−7	−8	−9	−11	−11	−12	−11	−11	−11	−11	−12	−12	−12	−11	−11	−11	−11
(England) Wilson	−7	−7	−8	−9	−9	−10	−11	−11	−11	−11	−11	−12	−11	−11	−12	−12	−11	−11
(England) Donald	−2	−2	−3	−4	−4	−4	−5	−5	−5	−5	−5	−6	−6	−6	−6	−7	−8	−9
(Sweden) Karlsson	−10	−10	−9	−10	−10	−10	−9	−9	−9	−8	−8	−9	−9	−10	−9	−10	−10	−9
(India) Randhawa	−6	−6	−6	−7	−8	−8	−8	−8	−8	−8	−8	−9	−8	−8	−9	−8	−8	−8
(South Africa) Goosen	−1	−2	−3	−4	−4	−4	−5	−5	−4	−4	−4	−5	−6	−6	−7	−7	−7	−7
(Australia) Green	−4	−4	−5	−6	−6	−5	−5	−6	−7	−7	−7	−7	−7	−7	−7	−6	−5	−7
(Sweden) Norén	−2	−3	−3	−4	−4	−4	−4	−4	−4	−4	−4	−5	−6	−6	−6	−6	−6	−7
(Argentina) Romero	−1	−2	−3	−4	−5	−6	−6	−6	−6	−6	−6	−6	−6	−5	−5	−5	−6	−7

Cumulative tournament scores, relative to par

Eagle	Birdie	Bogey

=== Playoff ===
The playoff began on the par five 18th; both players went for the green in two. Wilson ended up in the greenside bunker; Jiménez at the back of the green. Jiménez three-putted for a par 5 which was matched by Wilson.

The players headed once again for the 18th tee, this time Jiménez was able to get home in two after a superb drive; Wilson, on the other hand could only manage a lay up after he missed his tee shot to the right. Wilson managed to play his approach shot to 12 feet (3.6m), but his putt slipped by. Jiménez managed to two-putt for a birdie 4 and the title.

Place	Player	Score	To par	Money (€)	
1	Miguel Ángel Jiménez	Spain	5-4	−1	750,000
2	Oliver Wilson	England	5-5	E	500,000
