= Grégory Havret =

French professional golfer (born 1976)

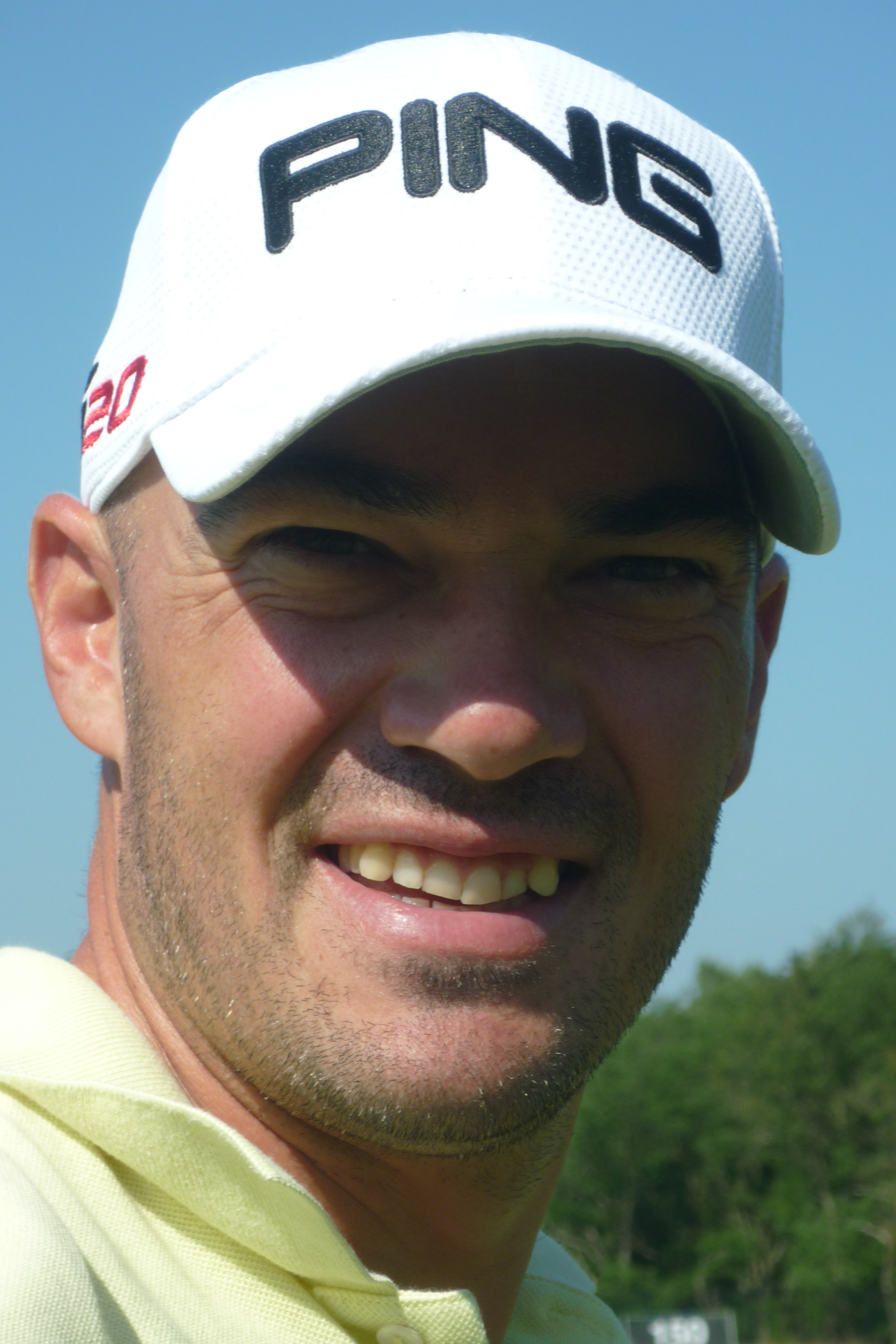
- Havret at the 2012 KLM Open

Personal information
- Nationality: France
- Born: 25 November 1976 (age 49) La Rochelle, France
- Height: 1.87 m (6 ft 2 in)
- Weight: 82 kg (181 lb; 12.9 st)
- Children: 2

Career
- Sport: Golf
- Turned professional: 1999
- Current tour: European Tour
- Professional wins: 5
- Highest ranking: 82 (14 September 2008)

Number of wins by tour
- European Tour: 3
- Other: 2

Best results in major championships
- Masters Tournament: CUT: 2011
- PGA Championship: CUT: 2007
- U.S. Open: 2nd: 2010
- The Open Championship: T19: 2008
Medal record
Mediterranean Games
Gold medal – first place	1997 Bari	Men's team
Silver medal – second place	1997 Bari	Individual

Grégory Havret (born 25 November 1976) is a French professional golfer.

== Amateur career ==
Havret won the French Amateur Championship three years in a row from 1997 to 1999, and in 1999 he won the European Amateur. He also won a minor professional tournament as an amateur, the 1998 Omnium National.

== Professional career ==
Havret turned professional in 1999 and won a place on the European Tour at the 2000 Qualifying School. He finished 60th on the Order of Merit in 2001, his rookie season, recording a maiden tour victory at the Italian Open. Havret's biggest win to date came in the 2007 Barclays Scottish Open at Loch Lomond, where he overcame major winner Phil Mickelson in a playoff. In August 2008, Havret recorded a second tournament victory in Scotland (third overall), leading the Johnnie Walker Championship at Gleneagles at the end of every round in recording a one shot win over Graeme Storm.

Havret's best year-end ranking on the Order of Merit is 19th in 2007. In 2008 Havret reached the top 100 of the Official World Golf Ranking and established himself as the highest ranked French golfer.

As a qualifier and ranked 391 in the world, Havret was the runner-up at the 2010 U.S. Open at Pebble Beach Golf Links, California, finishing one stroke behind Graeme McDowell.

In 2024, Havret was by the French Golf Federation appointed head of men's elite golf in France.

== Amateur wins ==
- 1997 (1) French Native Amateur Championship
- 1998 (1) French Native Amateur Championship
- 1999 (2) French Native Amateur Championship, European Amateur Championship

== Professional wins (5) ==
=== European Tour wins (3) ===
No.	Date	Tournament	Winning score	Margin of victory	Runner-up
1	4 Nov 2001	Atlanet Italian Open	−20 (65-66-68-69=268)	1 stroke	(Wales) Bradley Dredge
2	15 Jul 2007	Barclays Scottish Open	−14 (68-64-70-68=270)	Playoff	(United States) Phil Mickelson
3	31 Aug 2008	Johnnie Walker Championship at Gleneagles	−14 (68-71-69-70=278)	1 stroke	(England) Graeme Storm

European Tour playoff record (1–2)

No.	Year	Tournament	Opponent(s)	Result
1	2004	Dunhill Championship	(France) Raphaël Jacquelin, (Germany) Marcel Siem	Siem won with birdie on third extra hole Havret eliminated by birdie on second hole
2	2007	Barclays Scottish Open	(United States) Phil Mickelson	Won with par on first extra hole
3	2014	BMW International Open	(Spain) Rafa Cabrera-Bello, (Sweden) Henrik Stenson, (Paraguay) Fabrizio Zanotti	Zanotti won with par on fifth extra hole Cabrera-Bello eliminated by par on fourth hole Havret eliminated by birdie on second hole

=== French Tour wins (1) ===
No.	Date	Tournament	Winning score	Margin of victory	Runners-up
1	17 Dec 2011	AfrAsia Golf Masters	−3 (76-67-70=213)	Playoff	(South Africa) Hennie Otto, (France) Julien Quesne

=== Other wins (1) ===
- 1998 Omnium National (France, as an amateur)

== Results in major championships ==
Tournament	2007	2008	2009	2010	2011	2012
Masters Tournament					CUT	
U.S. Open				2	T30	
The Open Championship	CUT	T19		CUT	T57	CUT
PGA Championship	CUT					

Top 10
Did not play

CUT = missed the half-way cut
"T" = tied

=== Summary ===
Tournament	Wins	2nd	3rd	Top-5	Top-10	Top-25	Events	Cuts made
Masters Tournament	0	0	0	0	0	0	1	0
U.S. Open	0	1	0	1	1	1	2	2
The Open Championship	0	0	0	0	0	1	5	2
PGA Championship	0	0	0	0	0	0	1	0
Totals	0	1	0	1	1	2	9	4

- Most consecutive cuts made – 2 (twice)
- Longest streak of top-10s – 1

== Results in World Golf Championships ==
Tournament	2007	2008	2009
Match Play			
Championship		T15	
Invitational	T69		T74
Champions			

Did not play

"T" = Tied
Note that the HSBC Champions did not become a WGC event until 2009.

== Team appearances ==
Amateur

- European Youths' Team Championship (representing France): 1996
- European Amateur Team Championship (representing France ): 1997, 1999
- Eisenhower Trophy (representing France): 1998

Professional

- Seve Trophy (representing Continental Europe): 2007
- World Cup (representing France): 2007, 2008

== See also ==
- 2019 European Tour Qualifying School graduates
