= Oliver Wilson =

English professional golfer (born 1980)

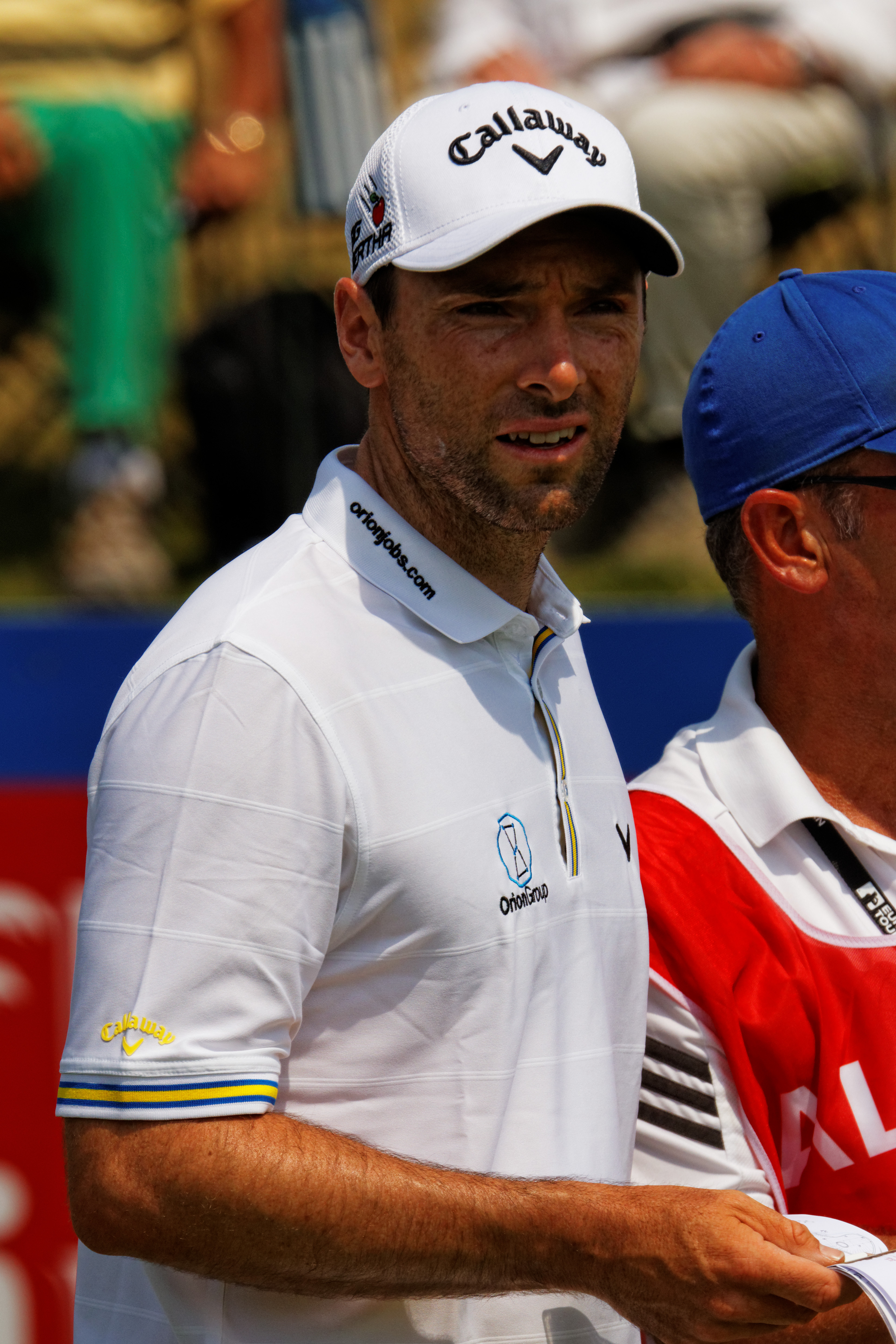

Personal information
- Full name: Oliver John Wilson
- Nationality: England
- Born: 14 September 1980 (age 46) Mansfield, Nottinghamshire, England
- Height: 5 ft 11 in (1.80 m)
- Weight: 168 lb (76 kg; 12.0 st)
- Spouse: Lauren
- Children: 2

Career
- Sport: Golf
- College: Augusta State University
- Turned professional: 2003
- Current tour: European Tour
- Former tour: Challenge Tour
- Professional wins: 4
- Highest ranking: 35 (4 October 2009)

Number of wins by tour
- European Tour: 2
- Challenge Tour: 2

Best results in major championships
- Masters Tournament: CUT: 2009, 2010
- PGA Championship: T19: 2009
- U.S. Open: T23: 2009
- The Open Championship: T24: 2009

Oliver John Wilson (born 14 September 1980) is an English professional golfer. Wilson was a member of the 2008 Ryder Cup, but had to wait another six years for his first European Tour win, the 2014 Alfred Dunhill Links Championship.

== Amateur career ==
Wilson was born in Mansfield, England, where his golfing career began at Coxmoor Golf Club, having been a junior at Oakmere Park Golf Club. He played collegiately at Augusta State University.

== Professional career ==
Wilson turned professional in 2003 and played on the Challenge Tour in 2004. He finished 15th on the Order of Merit list and moved up to the European Tour. He improved year-on-year, finishing 97th on the Order of Merit in 2005, 71st in 2006, 30th in 2007, 11th in 2008 and 7th in 2009.

In his rookie season on the European Tour in 2005, Wilson had three top ten finishes. In 2006 he lost in a play-off to Paul Casey at the Volvo China Open and in 2007 he had two second-place finishes. Wilson finished second four times in 2008, one of which took place at the BMW PGA Championship where he lost in a play-off to Miguel Ángel Jiménez. In April of that year Wilson reached the top 100 of the Official World Golf Ranking for the first time, the next month after his runner-up spot at the PGA Championship he reached a new high position of 45.

Also in 2008, Wilson qualified for that year's Ryder Cup matches.

In the opening tournament of the 2009 Race to Dubai, the HSBC Champions, Wilson recorded yet another runner-up finish. On 15 March 2009 he recorded a top-5 finish in the WGC-CA Championship. Wilson was also runner-up at the 2009 Alfred Dunhill Links Championship.

Wilson never finished higher than 5th in 2010, although he still finished in the top 50 of the Order of Merit. Wilson lost his full European Tour playing rights at the end of the 2011 season. He alternated between the European Tour and the Challenge Tour in 2012, but failed to regain his full playing rights through his play during the year or at the 2012 qualifying school.

After 228 European Tour starts, Wilson finally earned his first win at the 2014 Alfred Dunhill Links Championship, picking up a cheque for $800,000. Prior to his win, he had nine runner-up finishes, the most for a non-winner. Wilson was a sponsor invite who started the week 252nd in the Race to Dubai, 104th in the Challenge Tour rankings, and 792nd in the world. The win moved Wilson up to 39th in the Race to Dubai, 156th in the world, and earned him European Tour membership through the end of 2016.

After his win in the 2014 Alfred Dunhill Links Championship Wilson had another long period with little success. He failed to regain his Tour card through Q School in 2016 and played on the Challenge Tour in 2017 but his poor form continued. Speaking in an interview with bunkered magazine in December 2017, Wilson conceded that he'd contemplated quitting the sport after failing to earn his European Tour card for the 2018 season, missing the cut at Q-School.

Wilson showed a return of form in mid-2018. He qualified for the 2018 Open Championship through Final Qualifying, his first major since 2010, finished tied for 29th in the Porsche European Open the week after the Open and won the Swedish Challenge the following week, at the second hole of a playoff. Wilson had previously lost four playoffs on the European Tour and a playoff in the 2013 Northern Ireland Open Challenge. He finished the season 17th in the Challenge Tour Order of Merit, to just miss out on a European Tour place for 2019.

Wilson finishing tied for third place in the South African Open in December 2018. The event was part of the Open Qualifying Series and his high finish and tiebreaker world ranking position gave him an entry to the 2019 Open Championship.

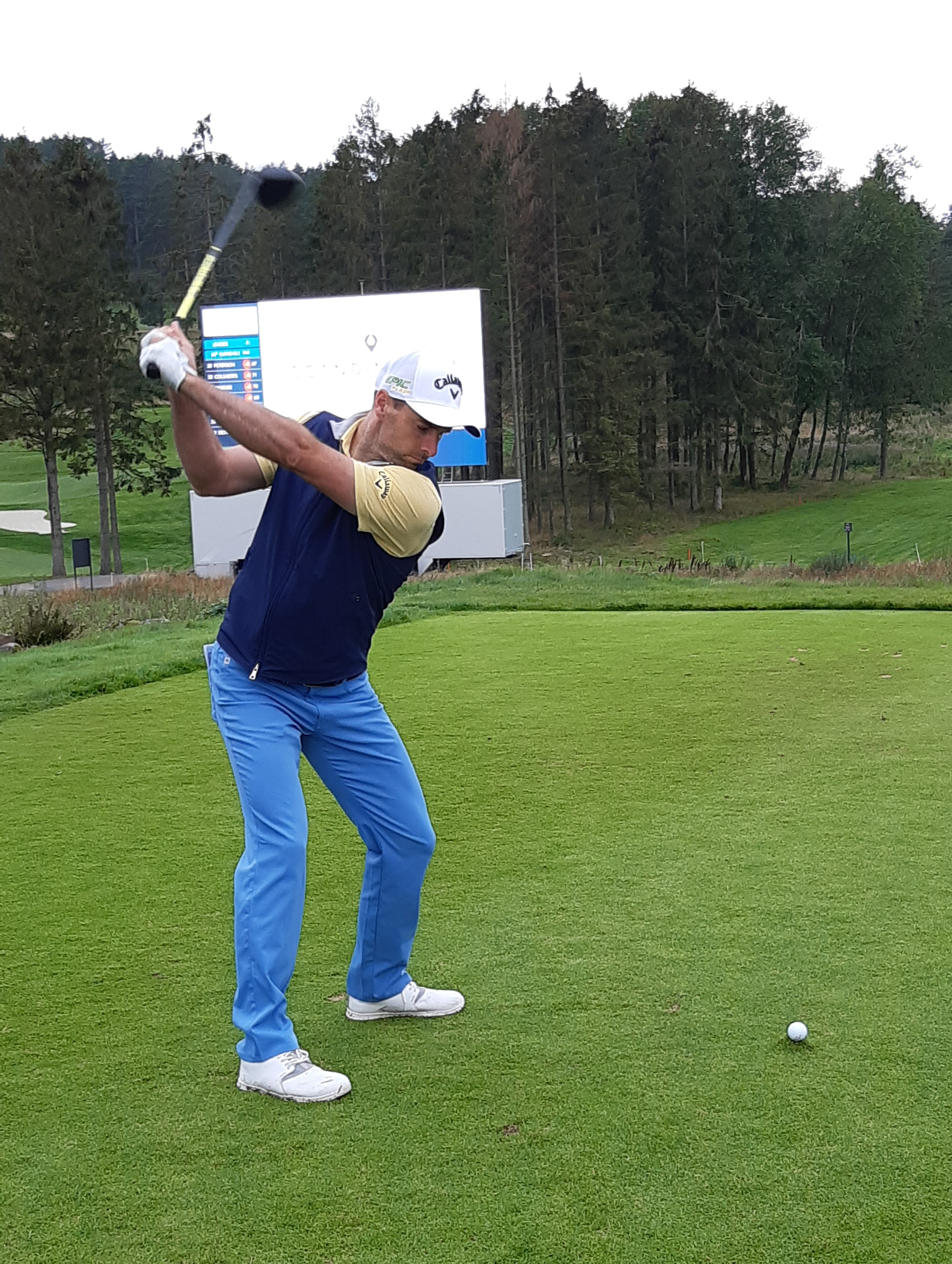
Oliver Wilson at the 2019 Scandinavian Invitation in Gothenburg, Sweden, on the first tee in the third round

In September 2022, Wilson won his second European Tour event at the Made in HimmerLand in Denmark. He shot a final-round 67 to beat Ewen Ferguson by one shot. It was his first European Tour victory in over seven years.

== Professional wins (4) ==
=== European Tour wins (2) ===
No.	Date	Tournament	Winning score	Margin of victory	Runner(s)-up
1	5 Oct 2014	Alfred Dunhill Links Championship	−17 (64-72-65-70=271)	1 stroke	(England) Tommy Fleetwood, (Northern Ireland) Rory McIlroy, (Scotland) Richie Ramsay
2	4 Sep 2022	Made in HimmerLand	−21 (66-65-65-67=263)	1 stroke	(Scotland) Ewen Ferguson

European Tour playoff record (0–4)

No.	Year	Tournament	Opponent(s)	Result
1	2005	Volvo China Open	(England) Paul Casey	Lost to birdie on first extra hole
2	2007	Johnnie Walker Classic	(South Africa) Anton Haig, (South Africa) Richard Sterne	Haig won with birdie on first extra hole
3	2008	BMW PGA Championship	(Spain) Miguel Ángel Jiménez	Lost to birdie on second extra hole
4	2008	HSBC Champions	(Spain) Sergio García	Lost to birdie on second extra hole

=== Challenge Tour wins (2) ===
No.	Date	Tournament	Winning score	Margin of victory	Runner-up
1	5 Aug 2018	Swedish Challenge	−13 (68-70-69-68=275)	Playoff	(Denmark) Joachim B. Hansen
2	7 Oct 2018	Monaghan Irish Challenge	−12 (69-70-68-69=276)	2 strokes	(Switzerland) Marco Iten

Challenge Tour playoff record (1–1)

No.	Year	Tournament	Opponent	Result
1	2013	Northern Ireland Open Challenge	(Netherlands) Daan Huizing	Lost to birdie on first extra hole
2	2018	Swedish Challenge	(Denmark) Joachim B. Hansen	Won with par on second extra hole

== Results in major championships ==
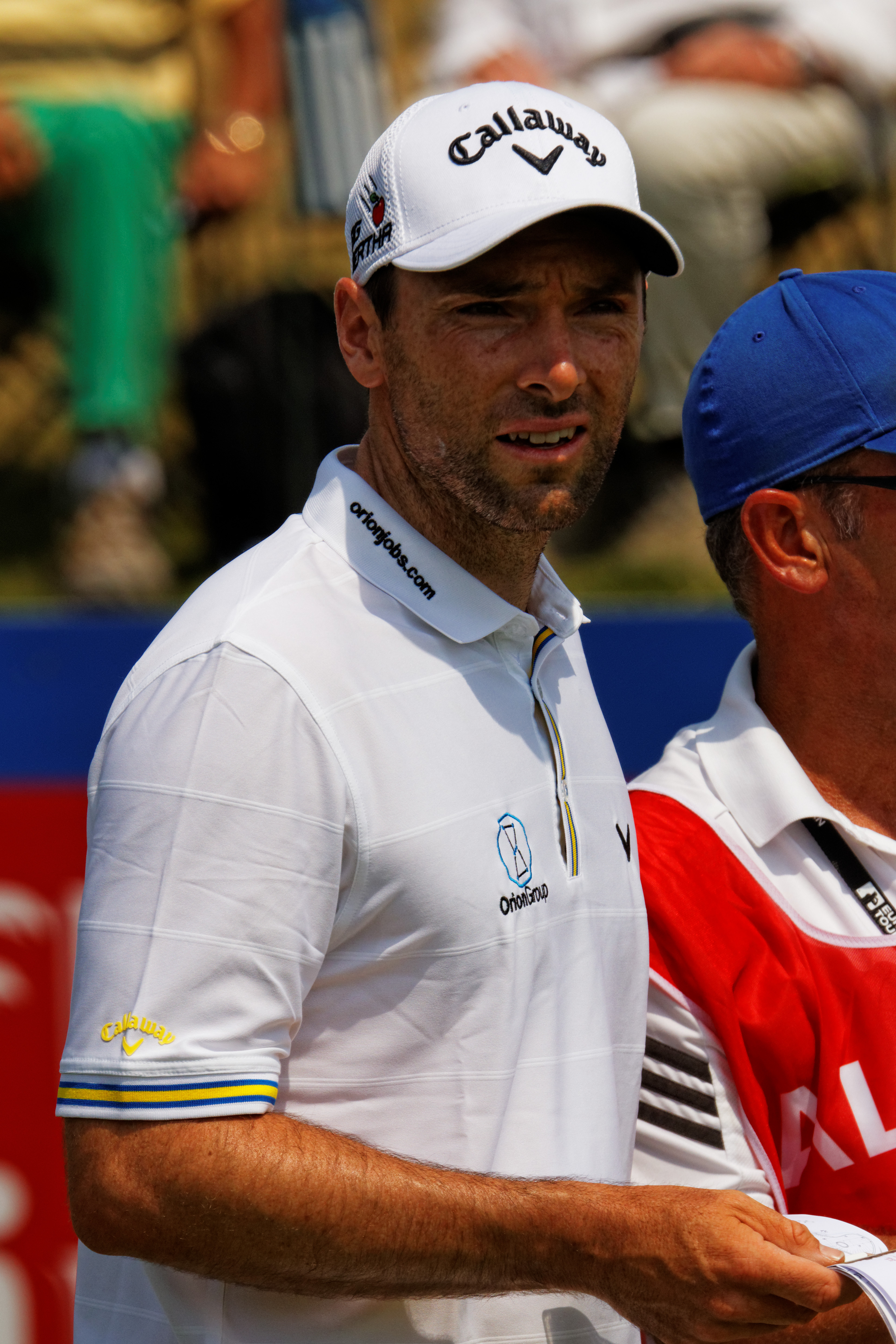
Wilson at the 2015 Open de France

Tournament	2006	2007	2008	2009
Masters Tournament				CUT
U.S. Open	CUT		T36	T23
The Open Championship		CUT	CUT	T24
PGA Championship			CUT	T19

Tournament	2010	2011	2012	2013	2014	2015	2016	2017	2018
Masters Tournament	CUT								
U.S. Open	CUT								
The Open Championship	CUT								CUT
PGA Championship	CUT								

Tournament	2019	2020	2021	2022	2023
Masters Tournament					
PGA Championship					
U.S. Open					
The Open Championship	CUT	NT			T33

Did not play

CUT = missed the half-way cut
"T" = tied
NT = No tournament due to the COVID-19 pandemic

=== Summary ===
Tournament	Wins	2nd	3rd	Top-5	Top-10	Top-25	Events	Cuts made
Masters Tournament	0	0	0	0	0	0	2	0
PGA Championship	0	0	0	0	0	1	3	1
U.S. Open	0	0	0	0	0	1	4	2
The Open Championship	0	0	0	0	0	1	7	2
Totals	0	0	0	0	0	3	16	5

- Most consecutive cuts made – 3 (2009 U.S. Open – 2009 PGA)
- Longest streak of top-10s – 0

== Results in The Players Championship ==
Tournament	2010
The Players Championship	T52

"T" indicates a tie for a place

== Results in World Golf Championships ==
Results not in chronological order before 2015.

Tournament	2008	2009	2010	2011	2012	2013	2014	2015
Championship		T5	67					
Match Play		R16	QF					
Invitational	T27	T11	T33					T67
Champions		T45					T64	

Top 10
Did not play

QF, R16, R32, R64 = Round in which player lost in match play
"T" = Tied
Note that the HSBC Champions did not become a WGC event until 2009.

== Team appearances ==
Amateur

- European Boys' Team Championship (representing England): 1997
- European Amateur Team Championship (representing England): 2003
- Walker Cup (representing Great Britain & Ireland): 2003 (winners)
- Palmer Cup (representing Great Britain & Ireland/Europe): 2001, 2002, 2003 (winners)

Professional

- Seve Trophy (representing Great Britain & Ireland): 2007 (winners), 2009 (winners)
- Ryder Cup (representing Europe): 2008
- Royal Trophy (representing Europe): 2009
