= 2007 World Cup (men's golf) =

Coordinates: 22°47′9″N 114°0′25″E

Tournament information
- Dates: 22–25 November
- Location: Shenzhen, China
- Courses: Mission Hills Golf Club, Olazabal course
- Format: 72 holes stroke play (best ball & alternate shot)

Statistics
- Par: 72
- Length: 7,251 yards (6,630 m)
- Field: 28 two-man teams
- Cut: None
- Prize fund: US$5.0 million
- Winner's share: US$1.6 million

Champion
- Scotland; Colin Montgomerie & Marc Warren
- 263 (−25)

The 2007 Omega Mission Hills World Cup took place from 22 November to 25 November at Mission Hills Golf Club in Shenzhen, China. It was the 53rd World Cup. 28 countries competed and each country sent two players. The team purse is $5,000,000 with $1,600,000 going to the winner. The Scottish team of Colin Montgomerie and Marc Warren won the tournament. They defeated the American team of Heath Slocum and Boo Weekley in a playoff on the third extra hole. This was the first time that Scotland won the World Cup.

== Qualification and format ==
The leading 18 available players from the Official World Golf Ranking on 3 September 2007 qualified. These 18 players then selected a player from their country to compete with them. The person they pick had to be ranked within the top 100 on the Official World Golf Ranking as of 3 September. If there was no other player from that country within the top 100 then the next highest ranked player would be their partner. If there was no other available player from that country within the top 500, then the exempt player could choose whoever he wants as long as they are a professional from the same country. World qualifiers were held from 27 September to 30 September. Ten countries earned their spot in the World Cup, five from the Asian qualifier and five from the Aruba qualifier.

The tournament was a 72-hole stroke play team event with each team consisting of two players. The first and third days are four-ball play and the second and final days are foursomes play.

== Teams ==
| Country | Players |
|---|---|
| Argentina | Ricardo González and Andrés Romero |
| Australia | Nathan Green and Nick O'Hern |
| Austria | Markus Brier and Claude Grenier |
| Canada | Wes Heffernan and Mike Weir |
| China | Liang Wenchong and Zhang Lianwei |
| Colombia | Jorge Benedetti and Gustavo Mendoza |
| Denmark | Anders Hansen and Søren Hansen |
| England | Ian Poulter and Justin Rose |
| Finland | Mikko Ilonen and Pasi Purhonen |
| France | Grégory Havret and Raphaël Jacquelin |
| Germany | Alex Čejka and Martin Kaymer |
| India | Gaurav Ghei and Jyoti Randhawa |
| Ireland | Michael Hoey and Gareth Maybin |
| Italy | Edoardo Molinari and Francesco Molinari |

| Country | Players |
|---|---|
| Japan | Tetsuji Hiratsuka and Hideto Tanihara |
| Netherlands | Robert-Jan Derksen and Maarten Lafeber |
| New Zealand | Richard Lee and Stephen Scahill |
| Paraguay | Carlos Franco and Fabrizio Zanotti |
| Philippines | Antonio Lascuña and Gerald Rosales |
| Puerto Rico | Wilfredo Morales and Miguel Suàrez |
| Scotland | Colin Montgomerie and Marc Warren |
| South Africa | Retief Goosen and Trevor Immelman |
| South Korea | Lee Seong-ho and Lee Sung |
| Spain | Miguel Ángel Jiménez and José Manuel Lara |
| Sweden | Peter Hanson and Robert Karlsson |
| Thailand | Thongchai Jaidee and Prayad Marksaeng |
| United States | Heath Slocum and Boo Weekley |
| Wales | Stephen Dodd and Bradley Dredge |

- Source

== Scores ==
1st round (four-ball)

| Place | Country | Score | To par |
|---|---|---|---|
| 1 | United States | 61 | −11 |
| 2 | Germany | 62 | −10 |
| T3 | England | 63 | −9 |
| T3 | Finland | 63 | −9 |
| T3 | Scotland | 63 | −9 |
| T3 | South Africa | 63 | −9 |
| T3 | Thailand | 63 | −9 |
| T3 | Wales | 63 | −9 |
| T9 | Austria | 64 | −8 |
| T9 | France | 64 | −8 |
| T11 | Argentina | 65 | −7 |
| T11 | China | 65 | −7 |
| T11 | Denmark | 65 | −7 |
| T11 | India | 65 | −7 |
| T11 | Italy | 65 | −7 |
| T11 | Netherlands | 65 | −7 |
| T11 | South Korea | 65 | −7 |
| T18 | Australia | 66 | −6 |
| T18 | Canada | 66 | −6 |
| T18 | Ireland | 66 | −6 |
| T18 | Paraguay | 66 | −6 |
| T18 | Sweden | 66 | −6 |
| T23 | Japan | 67 | −5 |
| T23 | New Zealand | 67 | −5 |
| T23 | Philippines | 67 | −5 |
| T23 | Spain | 67 | −5 |
| T27 | Colombia | 68 | −4 |
| T27 | Puerto Rico | 68 | −4 |

2nd round (foursomes)

| Place | Country | Score | To par |
|---|---|---|---|
| 1 | United States | 61-69=130 | −14 |
| T2 | England | 63-68=131 | −13 |
| T2 | Scotland | 63-68=131 | −13 |
| 4 | South Africa | 63-69=132 | −12 |
| T5 | Denmark | 65-68=133 | −11 |
| T5 | Germany | 62-71=133 | −11 |
| T5 | Italy | 65-68=133 | −11 |
| T8 | Netherlands | 65-69=134 | −10 |
| T8 | South Korea | 65-69=134 | −10 |
| T10 | Argentina | 65-70=135 | −9 |
| T10 | France | 64-71=135 | −9 |
| T12 | China | 65-71=136 | −8 |
| T12 | Sweden | 66-70=136 | −8 |
| 14 | Finland | 63-74=137 | −7 |
| T15 | Australia | 66-72=138 | −6 |
| T15 | Canada | 66-72=138 | −6 |
| T15 | Ireland | 66-72=138 | −6 |
| T15 | Spain | 67-71=138 | −6 |
| T19 | Austria | 64-75=139 | −5 |
| T19 | Paraguay | 66-73=139 | −5 |
| T19 | Thailand | 63-76=139 | −5 |
| T19 | Wales | 63-76=139 | −5 |
| T23 | India | 65-75=140 | −4 |
| T23 | Japan | 67-73=140 | −4 |
| T23 | Philippines | 67-73=140 | −4 |
| 26 | Puerto Rico | 68-73=141 | −3 |
| 27 | New Zealand | 67-77=144 | E |
| 28 | Colombia | 68-79=147 | +3 |

3rd round (four-ball)

| Place | Country | Score | To par |
|---|---|---|---|
| 1 | United States | 61-69-66=196 | −20 |
| T2 | France | 64-71-62=197 | −19 |
| T2 | Scotland | 63-68-66=197 | −19 |
| T4 | England | 63-68-67=198 | −18 |
| T4 | South Africa | 63-69-66=198 | −18 |
| T6 | Argentina | 65-70-64=199 | −17 |
| T6 | Germany | 62-71-66=199 | −17 |
| T6 | Netherlands | 65-69-65=199 | −17 |
| 9 | Denmark | 65-68-68=201 | −15 |
| T10 | Canada | 66-72-64=202 | −14 |
| T10 | Finland | 63-74-65=202 | −14 |
| T10 | Italy | 65-68-69=202 | −14 |
| T10 | Sweden | 66-70-66=202 | −14 |
| T10 | Thailand | 63-76-63=202 | −14 |
| T15 | China | 65-71-67=203 | −13 |
| T15 | Ireland | 66-72-65=203 | −13 |
| T15 | South Korea | 65-69-69=203 | −13 |
| T15 | Spain | 67-71-65=203 | −13 |
| 19 | India | 65-75-65=205 | −11 |
| T20 | Australia | 66-72-68=206 | −10 |
| T20 | Paraguay | 66-73-67=206 | −10 |
| T20 | Wales | 63-76-67=206 | −10 |
| T23 | Austria | 64-75-69=208 | −8 |
| T23 | Philippines | 67-73-68=208 | −8 |
| 25 | Japan | 67-73-69=209 | −7 |
| 26 | Puerto Rico | 68-73-71=212 | −4 |
| 27 | New Zealand | 67-77-70=214 | −2 |
| 28 | Colombia | 68-79-68=215 | −1 |

4th round (foursomes)

| Place | Country | Score | To par | Money (US$) |
|---|---|---|---|---|
| 1* | Scotland | 63-68-66-66=263 | −25 | 1,600,000 |
| 2 | United States | 61-69-66-67=263 | −25 | 800,000 |
| 3 | France | 64-71-62-67=264 | −24 | 450,000 |
| 4 | England | 63-69-66-67=265 | −23 | 240,000 |
| 5 | South Africa | 63-69-66-69=267 | −21 | 194,000 |
| T6 | Argentina | 65-70-64-69=268 | −20 | 141,500 |
| T6 | Germany | 62-71-66-69=268 | −20 | 141,500 |
| T6 | Netherlands | 65-69-65-69=268 | −20 | 141,500 |
| T6 | Sweden | 66-70-66-66=268 | −20 | 141,500 |
| 10 | Denmark | 65-68-68-68=269 | −19 | 101,000 |
| T11 | China | 65-71-67-68=271 | −17 | 87,500 |
| T11 | South Korea | 65-69-69-68=271 | −17 | 87,500 |
| T13 | Finland | 63-74-65-71=273 | −15 | 72,500 |
| T13 | Spain | 67-71-65-70=273 | −15 | 72,500 |
| T15 | Paraguay | 66-73-67-69=275 | −13 | 64,000 |
| T15 | Thailand | 63-76-63-73=275 | −13 | 64,000 |
| T17 | Austria | 64-75-69-68=276 | −12 | 58,000 |
| T17 | Canada | 66-72-64-74=276 | −12 | 58,000 |
| T17 | India | 65-75-65-71=276 | −12 | 58,000 |
| T17 | Italy | 65-68-69-74=276 | −12 | 58,000 |
| 21 | Australia | 66-72-68-73=279 | −9 | 53,000 |
| T22 | Philippines | 67-73-68-72=280 | −8 | 50,000 |
| T22 | Wales | 63-76-67-74=280 | −8 | 50,000 |
| 24 | Ireland | 66-72-65-78=281 | −7 | 47,000 |
| 25 | Japan | 67-73-69-73=282 | −6 | 45,000 |
| 26 | Colombia | 68-79-68-68=283 | −5 | 43,000 |
| 27 | New Zealand | 67-77-70-73=287 | −1 | 41,000 |
| 28 | Puerto Rico | 68-73-71-76=288 | E | 40,000 |

*Scotland won in a playoff.

== Round summaries ==
=== First round ===
The first round took place on 22 November and it was played in four-ball format. The front 9 scoring average was 32.036 and the back 9 average was 32.893 making the 18 hole average 64.929. The leaders after day one was the American team of Boo Weekley and Heath Slocum who shot an 11-under-par 61. Weekley shot 6 birdies and an eagle while Slocum added a birdie and an eagle. Weekley's eagle was a hole out on the 12th hole which is a 457-yard par 4.

Right behind the Americans were the German team of Alex Čejka and Martin Kaymer who finished the day at a 10-under-par 62. Čejka led the team with 8 birdies. The German team of Marcel Siem and Bernhard Langer won the World Cup last year.

Six teams shot a 9-under-par round of 63 and they are tied in third place. The Finnish team was the first off the tee and the surprise was Pasi Purhonen who is not ranked in the Official World Golf Rankings. He started out shooting birdie-birdie-eagle and also birdied the 9th. His partner Mikko Ilonen birdied the 5th hole as well. The team shot a 30 on the front 9 which helped them finish at 63. The Welsh team of Bradley Dredge and Stephen Dodd also shot a 63; including birdies on four of the last five holes. Another team that finished with a 63 was the English team of Justin Rose and Ian Poulter who had a pair of eagles. The Scottish team of Colin Montgomerie and Marc Warren also shot a 63 which included no bogeys. The South African and Thai team also shot a round of 63.

The host country China finished the day at 65 (-7) to be in a tie for 11th place. There were a total of 12 bogeys by all teams. Colombia and Puerto Rico (who are tied in last) each had 2 bogeys; no other team had more than one.

=== Second round ===
The second round took place on 23 November and it was played in foursomes format. The amount of bogeys on the day almost septupled the amount from the 1st Round. A total of 83 bogeys were shot on the day including 8 double bogeys, one triple and one "other". The New Zealand team shot a quintuple-bogey 9 on the par-4 14th hole. The lowest round on the day was a 4-under-par 68 which was shot by four different teams. 14 teams shot rounds of par or worse. After the first two days, no team has had a bogey-free 36 holes.

The American team maintained their one stroke lead by shooting a 3-under-par 69. The Americans had a total of five birdies, four of which were on par-5s. The other birdie was on the par-4 opening hole. Since 2000, three of the seven winners have held the lead after 36 holes and have gone on to win the championship.

The English and Scottish teams are tied in 2nd place, one stroke behind the Americans. Both teams shot rounds of 68. The South African team is in 4th, 2 strokes behind the Americans. The host country China shot a 71 on the day and are tied in 12th place.

=== Third round ===
The third round took place on 24 November and it was played in four-ball format. The front 9 scoring average was 32.964 and the back 9 average was 33.643 making the 18 hole average 66.607. The American team maintained their one stroke lead by shooting a 66. Weekley eagled the 3rd hole and made birdies at 7, 9 and 11. All of those holes were par-5s. The American team has a total of 3 eagles on the tournament which is more than any other team. Germany has the most birdies with 22 while the Americans have 16. England and Denmark have the fewest bogeys, with one each. If the Americans win the event then they will be the first team to lead wire-to-wire in the last seven years. They have held a stroke lead after the first three days of the event.

The best round of the day was the 10-under-par 62 shot by the French team. The great round moved them from 10th place to 2nd place and they are 1 stroke behind the Americans. Raphaël Jacquelin made five birdies and his partner Grégory Havret made three birdies and an eagle. The French are tied with the Scottish team who shot a 66 on the day. Two strokes behind the Americans is the South African and English teams. The Dutch, Argentinians and Germans are tied in 6th place only 3 strokes behind the Americans.

Every team was under par on the day. Only five teams posted a better third round score compared to their 1st round score.
