= 2018 Senior Open Championship =

Tournament information
- Dates: 26–29 July 2018
- Location: St Andrews, Scotland; 56.343°N 2.803°W
- Course: Old Course
- Organised by: The R&A
- Tours: European Senior Tour; PGA Tour Champions
- Format: 72 holes stroke play

Statistics
- Par: 72
- Length: 7,216 yd (6,598 m)
- Field: 144 players, 72 after cut
- Cut: 145 (+1)
- Prize fund: US$2,000,000

Champion
- (Spain) Miguel Ángel Jiménez
- 276 (−12)

Location map
- Location in Scotland

The 2018 Senior Open Championship was a senior major golf championship and the 32nd Senior Open Championship, held on 26–29 July at the Old Course at St Andrews in St Andrews, Scotland. It was the first Senior Open Championship played at the course and the 16th Senior Open Championship played as a senior major championship.

Miguel Ángel Jiménez won by one stroke over defending champion Bernhard Langer. The 2018 event was Jiménez's first Senior Open Championship title and his second senior major championship victory.

== Venue ==
The 2018 event was the first Senior Open Championship played at St Andrews.

=== Course layout ===
Hole	Yards	Par	Hole	Yards	Par
1	375	4	10	386	4
2	452	4	11	174	3
3	398	4	12	348	4
4	465	4	13	465	4
5	570	5	14	578	5
6	414	4	15	455	4
7	371	4	16	418	4
8	188	3	17	451	4
9	352	4	18	356	4
Out	3,585	36	In	3,631	36
Source:		Total		7,216	72

== Field ==
The field of 144 competitors comprised 136 professionals and 8 amateurs. An 18-hole stroke play qualifying round was held on Monday, 23 July for players who were not already exempt.

=== Past champions in the field ===
==== Made the cut ====
Player	Country	Year(s) won	R1	R2	R3	R4	Total	To par	Finish
Bernhard Langer	Germany	2010, 2014, 2017	67	69	73	68	277	−11	2
Marco Dawson	United States	2015	71	67	73	68	279	−9	T6
Fred Couples	United States	2012	71	72	73	71	287	−1	T21
Tom Watson	United States	2003, 2005, 2007	69	68	73	77	287	−1	T21
Paul Broadhurst	England	2016	71	70	73	76	290	+2	T32
Loren Roberts	United States	2006, 2009	71	73	74	75	293	+5	T50
Russ Cochran	United States	2011	72	72	76	79	299	+11	72

==== Missed the cut ====
Player	Country	Year won	R1	R2	Total	To par
Pete Oakley	United States	2004	72	79	151	+7
Noboru Sugai	Japan	2002	77	74	151	+7
Bruce Vaughan	United States	2008	74	80	154	+10

== Round summaries ==
=== First round ===
Thursday, 26 July 2018

Place	Player	Score	To par
T1	(United States) Kirk Triplett	65	−7
T1	(Thailand) Thaworn Wiratchant	65	−7
T2	(Canada) Stephen Ames	66	−6
T2	(Republic of Ireland) Paul McGinley	66	−6
T5	(Germany) Bernhard Langer	67	−5
T5	(United States) Scott McCarron	67	−5
T5	(United States) David Toms	67	−5
T8	(Australia) Paul Archbold	68	−4
T8	(United States) Clark Dennis	68	−4
T8	(Spain) Miguel Ángel Jiménez	68	−4
T8	(United States) Tom Lehman	68	−4
T8	(United States) Kenny Perry	68	−4
T8	(Sweden) Magnus Persson Atlevi	68	−4
T8	(Wales) Phillip Price	68	−4
T8	(Sweden) Jarmo Sandelin	68	−4
T8	(Fiji) Vijay Singh	68	−4
T8	(United States) Jeff Sluman	68	−4

=== Second round ===
Friday 27 July 2018

Place	Player	Score	To par
T1	(Canada) Stephen Ames	66-69=135	−9
T1	(Spain) Miguel Ángel Jiménez	68-67=135	−9
T3	(Germany) Bernhard Langer	67-69=136	−8
T3	(United States) Jeff Sluman	68-68=136	−8
T3	(United States) Kirk Triplett	65-71=136	−8
T6	(Sweden) Jarmo Sandelin	68-69=137	−7
T6	(Fiji) Vijay Singh	68-69=137	−7
T6	(United States) Tom Watson	69-68=137	−7
T9	(United States) Marco Dawson	71-67=138	−6
T9	(Argentina) Mauricio Molina	70-68=138	−6
T9	(United States) Tom Pernice Jr.	70-68=138	−6

Amateurs: Elliott (+2), Howison (+5), Maxfield (+6), Dornell (+7), Lacy (+8), Lutz (+8), McCoy (+9), Hughes (+10)

=== Third round ===
Saturday, 28 July 2018

Place	Player	Score	To par
1	(Spain) Miguel Ángel Jiménez	68-67-72=207	−9
T2	(Canada) Stephen Ames	66-69-74=209	−7
T2	(Germany) Bernhard Langer	67-69-73=209	−7
T2	(United States) Tom Pernice Jr.	70-68-71=209	−7
T2	(United States) Kirk Triplett	65-71-73=209	−7
T6	(United States) Tom Lehman	68-71-71=210	−6
T6	(Thailand) Prayad Marksaeng	70-70-70=210	−6
T6	(United States) Scott McCarron	67-73-70=210	−6
T6	(United States) Tom Watson	69-68-73=210	−6
T6	(Thailand) Thaworn Wiratchant	65-76-69=210	−6

=== Final round ===
Sunday, 29 July 2018

Place	Player	Score	To par	Money (€)
1	(Spain) Miguel Ángel Jiménez	68-67-72-69=276	−12	268,814
2	(Germany) Bernhard Langer	67-69-73-68=277	−11	179,241
T3	(Canada) Stephen Ames	66-69-74-69=278	−10	83,279
T3	(United States) Scott McCarron	67-73-70-68=278	−10	83,279
T3	(United States) Kirk Triplett	65-71-73-69=278	−10	83,279
T6	(United States) Marco Dawson	71-67-73-68=279	−9	45,313
T6	(United States) Tom Lehman	68-71-71-69=279	−9	45,313
T6	(United States) Tom Pernice Jr.	70-68-71-70=279	−9	45,313
T6	(Thailand) Thaworn Wiratchant	65-76-69-69=279	−9	45,313
10	(Thailand) Prayad Marksaeng	70-70-70-71=281	−7	32,190

==== Scorecard ====
Hole	1	2	3	4	5	6	7	8	9	10	11	12	13	14	15	16	17	18
Par	4	4	4	4	5	4	4	3	4	4	3	4	4	5	4	4	4	4
(Spain) Jiménez	−10	−10	−10	−10	−11	−11	−11	−11	−12	−12	−12	−13	−13	−13	−12	−12	−12	−12
(Germany) Langer	−8	−8	−9	−9	−10	−11	−11	−11	−11	−11	−11	−11	−10	−10	−11	−11	−11	−11
(Canada) Ames	−7	−6	−7	−6	−7	−8	−8	−8	−8	−8	−8	−9	−9	−9	−10	−10	−10	−10
(United States) McCarron	−6	−7	−7	−7	−8	−8	−7	−7	−7	−8	−8	−8	−8	−9	−9	−9	−10	−10
(United States) Triplett	−7	−8	−9	−9	−10	−11	−11	−11	−11	−12	−12	−11	−10	−10	−10	−10	−10	−10
(United States) Dawson	−5	−5	−5	−5	−5	−5	−6	−6	−7	−7	−7	−7	−7	−7	−8	−8	−8	−9
(United States) Lehman	−7	−6	−6	−6	−7	−8	−9	−9	−9	−9	−9	−9	−9	−9	−9	−8	−8	−9
(United States) Pernice	−7	−7	−7	−7	−7	−7	−8	−8	−8	−8	−8	−7	−7	−8	−8	−9	−9	−9
(Thailand) Wiratchant	−6	−6	−7	−7	−8	−8	−9	−9	−9	−9	−9	−9	−8	−9	−9	−9	−9	−9

Cumulative tournament scores, relative to par

Birdie	Bogey

== Notes and references ==
Preceded by 2018 Senior Players Championship	Senior Major Championships	Succeeded by 2019 Regions Tradition
