= Rapiscan Systems Classic =

Coordinates: 30.65°N 88.90°W

Tournament information
- Location: Saucier, Mississippi, U.S.
- Established: 2010
- Courses: Fallen Oak Golf Club, Grand Bear Golf Club
- Par: 72
- Length: 7,151 yards (6,539 m)
- Tour: PGA Tour Champions
- Format: Stroke play
- Prize fund: US$1,600,000
- Month played: March/April

Tournament record score
- Aggregate: 198 Steven Alker (2022)
- To par: −18 as above

Current champion
- (New Zealand) Steven Alker

Location map
- Location in the United States Location in Mississippi

The Rapiscan Systems Classic is a golf tournament on the PGA Tour Champions in southern Mississippi. It debuted sixteen years ago in 2010 at Fallen Oak Golf Club in Saucier, north of Biloxi. The tournament is sponsored by Rapiscan Systems.

The purse in 2019 was $1.6 million, with a winner's share of $240,000.

== Winners ==
Year	Winner	Score	To par	Margin of victory	Runner(s)-up	Purse ($)
Rapiscan Systems Classic
2022	(New Zealand) Steven Alker	198	−18	6 strokes	(Germany) Alex Čejka (Republic of Ireland) Pádraig Harrington	1,600,000
2021: No tournament
2020	Cancelled due to the COVID-19 pandemic					
2019	(United States) Kevin Sutherland	209	−7	Playoff	(United States) Scott Parel	1,600,000
2018	(United States) Steve Stricker	205	−11	3 strokes	(United States) Billy Andrade	1,600,000
Mississippi Gulf Resort Classic
2017	(Spain) Miguel Ángel Jiménez (2)	203	−13	Playoff	(United States) Gene Sauers	1,600,000
2016	(Spain) Miguel Ángel Jiménez	202	−14	2 strokes	(United States) Scott Dunlap	1,600,000
2015	(South Africa) David Frost	206	−10	1 stroke	(United States) Tom Lehman (United States) Kevin Sutherland	1,600,000
2014	(United States) Jeff Maggert	205	−11	2 strokes	(United States) Billy Andrade	1,600,000
2013	(United States) Michael Allen	205	−11	1 stroke	(Germany) Bernhard Langer	1,600,000
2012	(United States) Fred Couples	202	−14	1 stroke	(United States) Michael Allen	1,600,000
2011	(United States) Tom Lehman	200	−16	1 stroke	(South Africa) David Frost (Zimbabwe) Nick Price (United States) Jeff Sluman	1,600,000
2010	(United States) David Eger	205	−11	1 stroke	(United States) Tommy Armour III	1,600,000

== See also ==
Other Mississippi Gulf Coast golf tournaments:

- Gulfport Open, a PGA Tour event, played 1944–45
- Mississippi Gulf Coast Classic, a Nationwide Tour event, played 1990–97
- Mississippi Gulf Coast Open, a Nationwide Tour event, played 1999–2000
