= 2007 Seve Trophy =

- Dates: 27–30 September
- Venue: The Heritage Golf & Spa Resort
- Location: County Laois, Ireland
- Captains: Nick Faldo (GB&I); Seve Ballesteros (Europe)
(United Kingdom) (Republic of Ireland)	16½	11½	(Europe)
- Great Britain and Ireland wins the Seve Trophy

The 2007 Seve Trophy took place between 27 and 30 September at The Heritage Golf & Spa Resort in Ireland. The team captain for Great Britain and Ireland was Nick Faldo, with the captain for Continental Europe being Seve Ballesteros. Great Britain and Ireland retained the trophy for the third consecutive time.

== Format ==
The teams competed over four days with five fourball matches on both Thursday and Friday, four greensomes matches on Saturday morning, four foursomes matches on Saturday afternoon and ten singles on Sunday. It means a total of 28 points are available with 14½ points required for victory. If the score finished at 14-14, then two players from each team would play the 18th using the greensomes format to find the winner.

Each member of the winner team received €125,000, the losing team €75,000 each, giving a total prize fund of €2,000,000.

== Teams ==
The teams were made up of four players from the Official World Golf Ranking list, four players from the European points list, and two captain's pick. However, there were a number of players who qualified for the trophy, but pulled out. These include: Henrik Stenson, Pádraig Harrington, Sergio García and Lee Westwood.

Team GB&I
Name	Country	Qualification
Nick Faldo	England	Non-playing captain
Justin Rose	England	World rankings
Paul Casey	England	World rankings
Colin Montgomerie	Scotland	World rankings
Bradley Dredge	Wales	World rankings
Graeme Storm	England	European points
Oliver Wilson	England	European points
Phillip Archer	England	European points
Nick Dougherty	England	European points
Marc Warren	Scotland	Captain's pick
Simon Dyson	England	Captain's pick

Team Continental Europe
Name	Country	Qualification
Seve Ballesteros	Spain	Non-playing captain
Robert Karlsson	Sweden	World rankings
Miguel Ángel Jiménez	Spain	World rankings
Mikko Ilonen	Finland	World rankings
Raphaël Jacquelin	France	World rankings
Søren Hansen	Denmark	European points
Grégory Havret	France	European points
Peter Hanson	Sweden	European points
Markus Brier	Austria	European points
Gonzalo Fernández-Castaño	Spain	Captain's pick
Thomas Bjørn	Denmark	Captain's pick

== Day one ==
Thursday, 27 September 2007

=== Fourball ===
	Results
Montgomerie/Warren	(Europe) 3 & 1	Hanson/Karlsson
Dredge/Archer	(United Kingdom) (Republic of Ireland) 2 & 1	Jiménez/Fdez-Castaño
Casey/Dyson	(Europe) 4 & 3	Jacquelin/Havret
Dougherty/Storm	(United Kingdom) (Republic of Ireland) 1 up	Bjørn/Hansen
Rose/Wilson	(Europe) 3 & 2	Brier/Ilonen
2	Session	3
2	Overall	3

== Day two ==
Friday, 28 September 2007

=== Fourball ===
	Results
Dredge/Archer	(United Kingdom) (Republic of Ireland) 5 & 4	Hanson/Karlsson
Montgomerie/Warren	(Europe) 5 & 3	Jacquelin/Havret
Wilson/Dyson	(United Kingdom) (Republic of Ireland) 3 & 2	Bjørn/Hansen
Dougherty/Storm	(Europe) 1 up	Ilonen/Brier
Rose/Casey	(United Kingdom) (Republic of Ireland) 1 up	Jiménez/Fdez-Castaño
3	Session	2
5	Overall	5

== Day three ==
Saturday, 29 September 2007

=== Morning greensomes ===
	Results
Rose/Casey	(Europe) 3 & 1	Karlsson/Fdez-Castaño
Dougherty/Storm	(Europe) 2 & 1	Jacquelin/Havret
Wilson/Dyson	(Europe) 1 up	Hanson/Hansen
Dredge/Archer	halved	Brier/Ilonen
½	Session	3½
5½	Overall	8½

=== Afternoon foursomes ===
	Results
Rose/Dougherty	(United Kingdom) (Republic of Ireland) 2 & 1	Jacquelin/Havret
Montgomerie/Storm	(Europe) 3 & 2	Karlsson/Fdez-Castaño
Wilson/Dyson	(United Kingdom) (Republic of Ireland) 3 & 2	Hanson/Hansen
Dredge/Archer	(United Kingdom) (Republic of Ireland) 2 up	Brier/Jiménez
3	Session	1
8½	Overall	9½

== Day four ==
Sunday, 30 September 2007

== Singles ==
	Results
Colin Montgomerie	(United Kingdom) (Republic of Ireland) 1 up	Robert Karlsson
Paul Casey	(United Kingdom) (Republic of Ireland) 3 & 2	Raphaël Jacquelin
Marc Warren	(United Kingdom) (Republic of Ireland) 1 up	Grégory Havret
Nick Dougherty	halved	Søren Hansen
Graeme Storm	(United Kingdom) (Republic of Ireland) 6 & 5	Thomas Bjørn
Simon Dyson	(United Kingdom) (Republic of Ireland) 2 & 1	Mikko Ilonen
Phillip Archer	halved	Markus Brier
Bradley Dredge	(United Kingdom) (Republic of Ireland) 2 up	Gonzalo Fdez-Castaño
Oliver Wilson	(Europe) 1 up	Peter Hanson
Justin Rose	(United Kingdom) (Republic of Ireland) 2 & 1	Miguel Ángel Jiménez
8	Session	2
16½	Overall	11½
