= Bangkok Airways Open =

Tournament information
- Location: Bangkok, Thailand
- Established: 2005
- Course: Santiburi Samui Country Club
- Par: 71
- Length: 6,853 yards (6,266 m)
- Tour: Asian Tour
- Format: Stroke play
- Prize fund: US$300,000
- Month played: June
- Final year: 2008

Tournament record score
- Aggregate: 268 Lee Sung (2007)
- To par: −16 as above

Final champion
- (Thailand) Thaworn Wiratchant
- Location in Thailand

The Bangkok Airways Open was an Asian Tour golf tournament played in Thailand from 2005 to 2008. In 2008 the prize fund was US$300,000, which is one of the smaller purses on the tour.

== Winners ==
Year	Winner	Score	To par	Margin of victory	Runner-up
2008	(Thailand) Thaworn Wiratchant	271	−13	3 strokes	(Japan) Shintaro Kai
2007	(South Korea) Lee Sung	268	−16	3 strokes	(Thailand) Prayad Marksaeng
2006	(Thailand) Chawalit Plaphol	281	−3	Playoff	(Canada) Rick Gibson
2005	(Taiwan) Lu Wen-teh	277	−7	Playoff	(Thailand) Thammanoon Sriroj
