= 2008 European Tour =

Golf tour season

2008 European Tour season
- Duration: 8 November 2007 – 2 November 2008
- Number of official events: 52 (Note: A further two tournaments were scheduled but were cancelled.)
- Most wins: (Northern Ireland) Darren Clarke (2) (Note: Tiger Woods won three events, but was not a European Tour member.) (England) Richard Finch (2) (Republic of Ireland) Pádraig Harrington (2) (Spain) Miguel Ángel Jiménez (2) (Sweden) Robert Karlsson (2) (Germany) Martin Kaymer (2) (Northern Ireland) Graeme McDowell (2)
- Order of Merit: (Sweden) Robert Karlsson
- Golfer of the Year: (Republic of Ireland) Pádraig Harrington
- Players' Player of the Year: (Republic of Ireland) Pádraig Harrington
- Sir Henry Cotton Rookie of the Year: (Spain) Pablo Larrazábal

The 2008 European Tour was the 37th season of the European Tour, the main professional golf tour in Europe since its inaugural season in 1972.

== Changes for 2008 ==
There were four new tournaments, the Emaar-MGF Indian Masters, the Ballantine's Championship in South Korea, and in Spain the Madrid Masters and the Castelló Masters Costa Azahar. Lost from the tour schedule were the Singapore Masters, the TCL Classic, the Deutsche Bank Players Championship of Europe, the Madrid Open and the Mallorca Classic. The World Match Play Championship was originally scheduled, but was not held; it returned in 2009 with a new sponsor and venue.

== Schedule ==
The following table lists official events during the 2008 season.

Date	Tournament	Host country	Purse	Winner (Note: The number in brackets after each winner's name is the number of European Tour events they had won up to and including that tournament. This information is only shown for European Tour members and are inclusive of the three United States-based major championships which were included on the schedule for the first time in 1998, with earlier editions having retrospectively been recognised as official tour wins.)	OWGR points	Other tours (Note: AFR − Sunshine Tour; ANZ − PGA Tour of Australasia; ASA − Asian Tour; CHA − Challenge Tour; KOR − Korean Tour.)	Notes
11 Nov	HSBC Champions	China	US$5,000,000	(United States) Phil Mickelson (n/a)	52	AFR, (Note: Sunshine Tour unofficial event) ANZ, (Note: PGA Tour of Australasia unofficial event) ASA (Note: Asian Tour unofficial event)	Limited-field event
18 Nov	UBS Hong Kong Open	Hong Kong	US$2,250,000	(Spain) Miguel Ángel Jiménez (14)	36	ASA	
25 Nov	MasterCard Masters	Australia	A$1,500,000	(Australia) Aaron Baddeley (n/a)	24	ANZ	
2 Dec	Michael Hill New Zealand Open	New Zealand	NZ$1,500,000	(England) Richard Finch (1)	20	ANZ	
9 Dec	Alfred Dunhill Championship	South Africa	€1,000,000	(England) John Bickerton (3)	22	AFR	
16 Dec	South African Airways Open	South Africa	€1,000,000	(South Africa) James Kingston (1)	32	AFR (Note: Sunshine Tour flagship event)	
13 Jan	Joburg Open	South Africa	€1,100,000	(South Africa) Richard Sterne (3)	20	AFR	
20 Jan	Abu Dhabi Golf Championship	UAE	US$2,000,000	(Germany) Martin Kaymer (1)	44		
27 Jan	Commercialbank Qatar Masters	Qatar	US$2,500,000	(Australia) Adam Scott (6)	46		
3 Feb	Dubai Desert Classic	UAE	US$2,500,000	(United States) Tiger Woods (n/a)	50		
10 Feb	Emaar-MGF Indian Masters	India	US$2,500,000	(India) Shiv Chawrasia (1)	26	ASA	New tournament
~~17 Feb~~	Singapore Masters	Singapore	–	Cancelled	–	ASA	
17 Feb	Enjoy Jakarta Astro Indonesia Open	Indonesia	US$1,200,000	(Chile) Felipe Aguilar (1)	20	ASA	
24 Feb	WGC-Accenture Match Play Championship	United States	US$8,000,000	(United States) Tiger Woods (n/a)	76		World Golf Championship
2 Mar	Johnnie Walker Classic	India	£1,250,000	(New Zealand) Mark Brown (1)	38	ANZ, ASA	
9 Mar	Maybank Malaysian Open	Malaysia	US$2,000,000	(India) Arjun Atwal (3)	24	ASA	
16 Mar	Ballantine's Championship	South Korea	€2,000,000	(Northern Ireland) Graeme McDowell (3)	28	ASA, KOR	New tournament
23 Mar	Madeira Islands Open BPI - Portugal	Portugal	€700,000	(Scotland) Alastair Forsyth (2)	24		
23 Mar	WGC-CA Championship	United States	US$8,000,000	(Australia) Geoff Ogilvy (3)	76		World Golf Championship
30 Mar	MAPFRE Open de Andalucia	Spain	€1,000,000	(France) Thomas Levet (4)	24		
6 Apr	Estoril Open de Portugal	Portugal	€1,250,000	(France) Grégory Bourdy (2)	24		
13 Apr	Masters Tournament	United States	US$7,500,000	(South Africa) Trevor Immelman (4)	100		Major championship
20 Apr	Volvo China Open	China	US$2,200,000	(Republic of Ireland) Damien McGrane (1)	20	ASA	
27 Apr	BMW Asian Open	China	US$2,300,000	(Northern Ireland) Darren Clarke (11)	32	ASA	
4 May	Open de España	Spain	€2,000,000	(Republic of Ireland) Peter Lawrie (1)	24		
11 May	Methorios Capital Italian Open	Italy	€1,700,000	(South Africa) Hennie Otto (1)	24		
18 May	Irish Open	Ireland	€2,500,000	(England) Richard Finch (2)	28		
25 May	BMW PGA Championship	England	€4,500,000	(Spain) Miguel Ángel Jiménez (15)	64		Flagship event
1 Jun	Celtic Manor Wales Open	Wales	£1,800,000	(Australia) Scott Strange (1)	36		
8 Jun	Bank Austria GolfOpen	Austria	€1,300,000	(India) Jeev Milkha Singh (3)	24		
15 Jun	U.S. Open	United States	US$7,500,000	(United States) Tiger Woods (n/a)	100		Major championship
15 Jun	Saint-Omer Open	France	€600,000	(England) David Dixon (1)	18	CHA	
22 Jun	BMW International Open	Germany	€2,000,000	(Germany) Martin Kaymer (2)	30		
29 Jun	Open de France Alstom	France	€4,000,000	(Spain) Pablo Larrazábal (1)	38		
6 Jul	European Open	England	£2,400,000	(England) Ross Fisher (2)	40		
13 Jul	Barclays Scottish Open	Scotland	£3,000,000	(Northern Ireland) Graeme McDowell (4)	50		
20 Jul	The Open Championship	England	£4,200,000	(Republic of Ireland) Pádraig Harrington (13)	100		Major championship
27 Jul	Inteco Russian Open Golf Championship	Russia	US$2,000,000	(Sweden) Mikael Lundberg (2)	24		
3 Aug	WGC-Bridgestone Invitational	United States	US$8,000,000	(Fiji) Vijay Singh (13)	74		World Golf Championship
10 Aug	PGA Championship	United States	US$7,500,000	(Republic of Ireland) Pádraig Harrington (14)	100		Major championship
17 Aug	SAS Masters	Sweden	€1,600,000	(Sweden) Peter Hanson (2)	24		
24 Aug	KLM Open	Netherlands	€1,800,000	(Northern Ireland) Darren Clarke (12)	30		
31 Aug	Johnnie Walker Championship at Gleneagles	Scotland	£1,400,000	(France) Grégory Havret (3)	32		
7 Sep	Omega European Masters	Switzerland	€2,000,000	(France) Jean-François Lucquin (1)	24		
14 Sep	Mercedes-Benz Championship	Germany	€2,000,000	(Sweden) Robert Karlsson (8)	34		Limited-field event
28 Sep	Quinn Insurance British Masters	England	£1,800,000	(Spain) Gonzalo Fernández-Castaño (4)	30		
5 Oct	Alfred Dunhill Links Championship	Scotland	US$5,000,000	(Sweden) Robert Karlsson (9)	50		Pro-Am
~~12 Oct~~	World Match Play Championship	England	–	Cancelled	–		
12 Oct	Madrid Masters	Spain	€1,000,000	(South Africa) Charl Schwartzel (3)	24		New tournament
19 Oct	Portugal Masters	Portugal	€3,000,000	(Spain) Álvaro Quirós (2)	38		
26 Oct	Castelló Masters Costa Azahar	Spain	€2,000,000	(Spain) Sergio García (7)	38		New tournament
2 Nov	Volvo Masters	Spain	€4,250,000	(Denmark) Søren Kjeldsen (2)	50		Tour Championship

=== Unofficial events ===
The following events were sanctioned by the European Tour, but did not carry official money, nor were wins official.

Date	Tournament	Host country	Purse	Winners	OWGR points	Notes
21 Sep	Ryder Cup	United States	n/a	Team USA	n/a	Team event
30 Nov	Omega Mission Hills World Cup	China	US$5,500,000	(Sweden) Robert Karlsson and (Sweden) Henrik Stenson	n/a	Team event

== Location of tournaments ==
Location of official tournaments of the 2008 European Tour in Europe.
Major Championship
Flagship event
Tour Championship
Regular event
Location of official tournaments of the 2008 European Tour outside Europe.
Major Championship
World Golf Championship
Regular event

South Africa
United Arab Emirates

== Order of Merit ==
The Order of Merit was based on prize money won during the season, calculated in Euros.

Position	Player	Prize money (€)
1	(Sweden) Robert Karlsson	2,732,748
2	(Republic of Ireland) Pádraig Harrington	2,459,109
3	(England) Lee Westwood	2,424,642
4	(Spain) Miguel Ángel Jiménez	2,066,596
5	(Northern Ireland) Graeme McDowell	1,859,346
6	(England) Ross Fisher	1,836,530
7	(Sweden) Henrik Stenson	1,798,617
8	(Germany) Martin Kaymer	1,794,500
9	(Spain) Sergio García	1,591,917
10	(Denmark) Søren Kjeldsen	1,440,979

== Awards ==
Award	Winner	Ref.
Golfer of the Year	(Republic of Ireland) Pádraig Harrington	
Players' Player of the Year	(Republic of Ireland) Pádraig Harrington	
Sir Henry Cotton Rookie of the Year	(Spain) Pablo Larrazábal	

== See also ==
- 2008 in golf
- 2008 European Seniors Tour
