= BMW Asian Open =

Tournament information
- Location: Shanghai, China
- Established: 2001
- Course: Tomson Shanghai Pudong Golf Club
- Par: 72
- Length: 7,327 yards (6,700 m)
- Tours: Asian Tour; European Tour
- Format: Stroke play
- Prize fund: €2,300,000
- Month played: April
- Final year: 2008

Tournament record score
- Aggregate: 262 Ernie Els (2005)
- To par: −26 as above

Final champion
- (Northern Ireland) Darren Clarke

Location map
- Location in China

The BMW Asian Open was a men's professional golf tournament that was co-sanctioned by the Asian Tour and the European Tour. The event was founded in 2001, as part of the European Tour's drive to expand into Asia, and China in particular.

The first two editions were held at Ta Shee Golf and Country Club in Taiwan, before the tournament was moved to the People's Republic of China in 2004, since when it was played at the Tomson Shanghai Pudong Golf Club in Pudong, Shanghai.

In 2005 Ernie Els set a new Asian Tour record for the biggest margin of victory when he triumphed by 13 strokes. In 2008 the prize fund was $2.3 million, an increase of more than fifty percent from the 2006 fund of $1.5 million.

== Winners ==
Year	Tours (Note: ASA − Asian Tour; EUR − European Tour.)	Winner	Score	To par	Margin of victory	Runner(s)-up	Ref.
2008	ASA, EUR	(Northern Ireland) Darren Clarke	280	−8	1 stroke	(Netherlands) Robert-Jan Derksen	
2007	ASA, EUR	(France) Raphaël Jacquelin	278	−10	2 strokes	(Denmark) Søren Kjeldsen	
2006	ASA, EUR	(Spain) Gonzalo Fernández-Castaño	281	−7	Playoff	(Sweden) Henrik Stenson	
2005	ASA, EUR	(South Africa) Ernie Els	262	−26	13 strokes	(England) Simon Wakefield	
2004	ASA, EUR	(Spain) Miguel Ángel Jiménez	274	−14	3 strokes	(England) Simon Dyson	
2003: No tournament
2002	ASA, EUR	(Republic of Ireland) Pádraig Harrington	273	−15	1 stroke	(India) Jyoti Randhawa	
2001	ASA, EUR	(Sweden) Jarmo Sandelin	278	−10	1 stroke	(Thailand) Thongchai Jaidee (Spain) José María Olazábal	
