= Lee Sung =

South Korean golfer

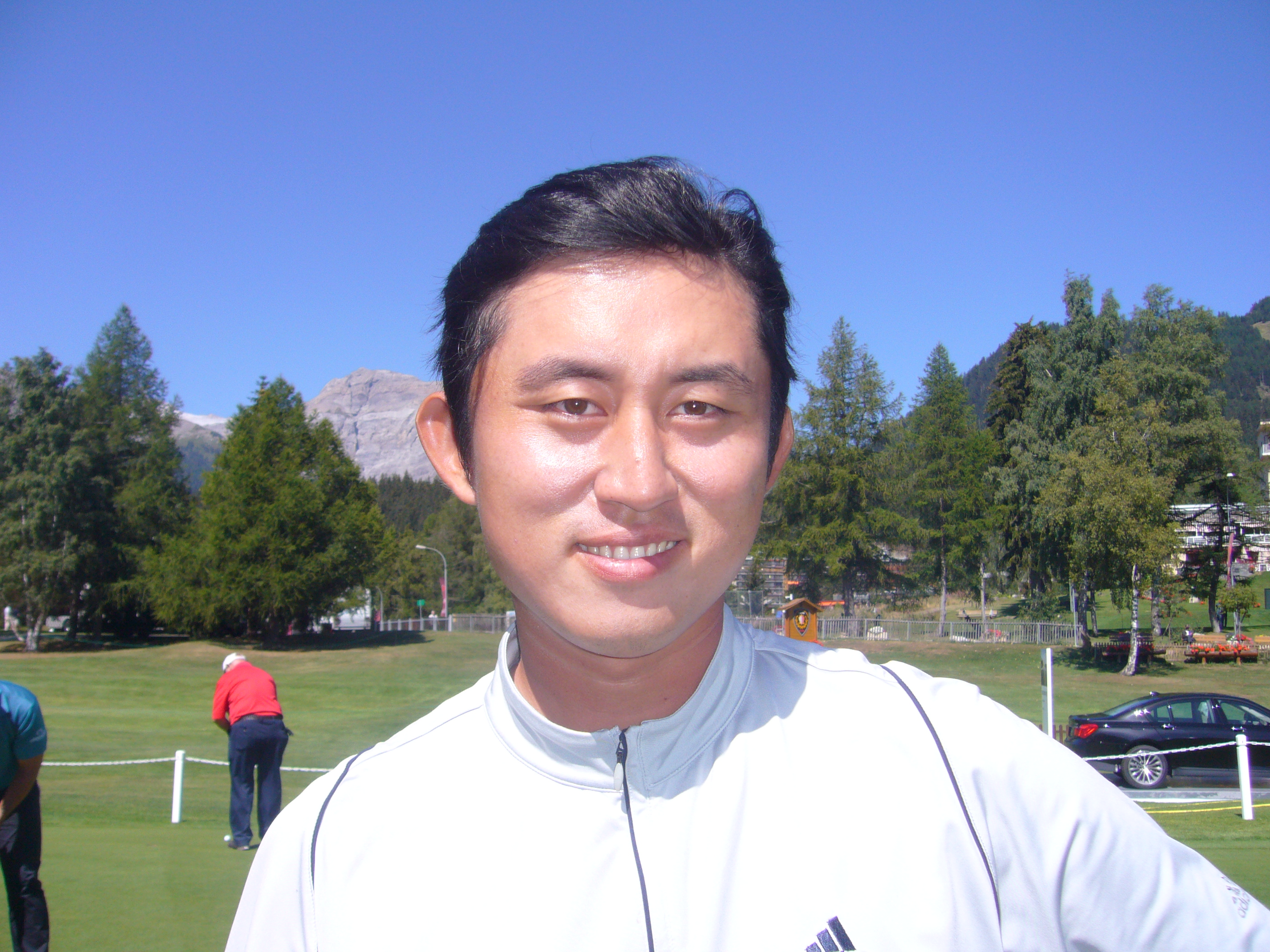

Personal information
- Full name: Lee Sung-man
- Nationality: South Korea
- Born: 16 January 1980 (age 46)

Career
- Sport: Golf
- Turned professional: 2000
- Current tour: Asian Tour
- Former tours: Nationwide Tour; Gateway Tour
- Professional wins: 2

Number of wins by tour
- Asian Tour: 1
- Other: 1

Lee Sung (Korean: 이승만; born 16 January 1980), also known as Lee Sung-man, is a South Korean professional golfer.

== Career ==
Lee played on the Nationwide Tour in the United States in 2001 and 2003. After losing his card on that tour in 2003, he was successful at the Asian Tour's qualifying school in January 2004, and he has played mainly in Asia since then. He picked up his first tour victory at the 2007 Bangkok Airways Open. He represented South Korea at the 2007 Omega Mission Hills World Cup with Lee Seong-ho.

Lee was born deaf. In November 2010 he underwent an operation to his right ear, his hearing is now restored.

== Professional wins (2) ==
=== Asian Tour wins (1) ===
No.	Date	Tournament	Winning score	Margin of victory	Runner-up
1	10 Jun 2007	Bangkok Airways Open	−16 (66-69-62-71=268)	3 strokes	(Thailand) Prayad Marksaeng

Asian Tour playoff record (0–1)

No.	Year	Tournament	Opponent	Result
1	2009	Hero Honda Indian Open	(India) Chinnaswamy Muniyappa	Lost to birdie on first extra hole

=== Gateway Tour wins (1) ===
- 2012 Tournament 6

== Team appearances ==
- World Cup (representing South Korea): 2007
