= Miguel Ángel Jiménez =

Spanish professional golfer (born 1964)

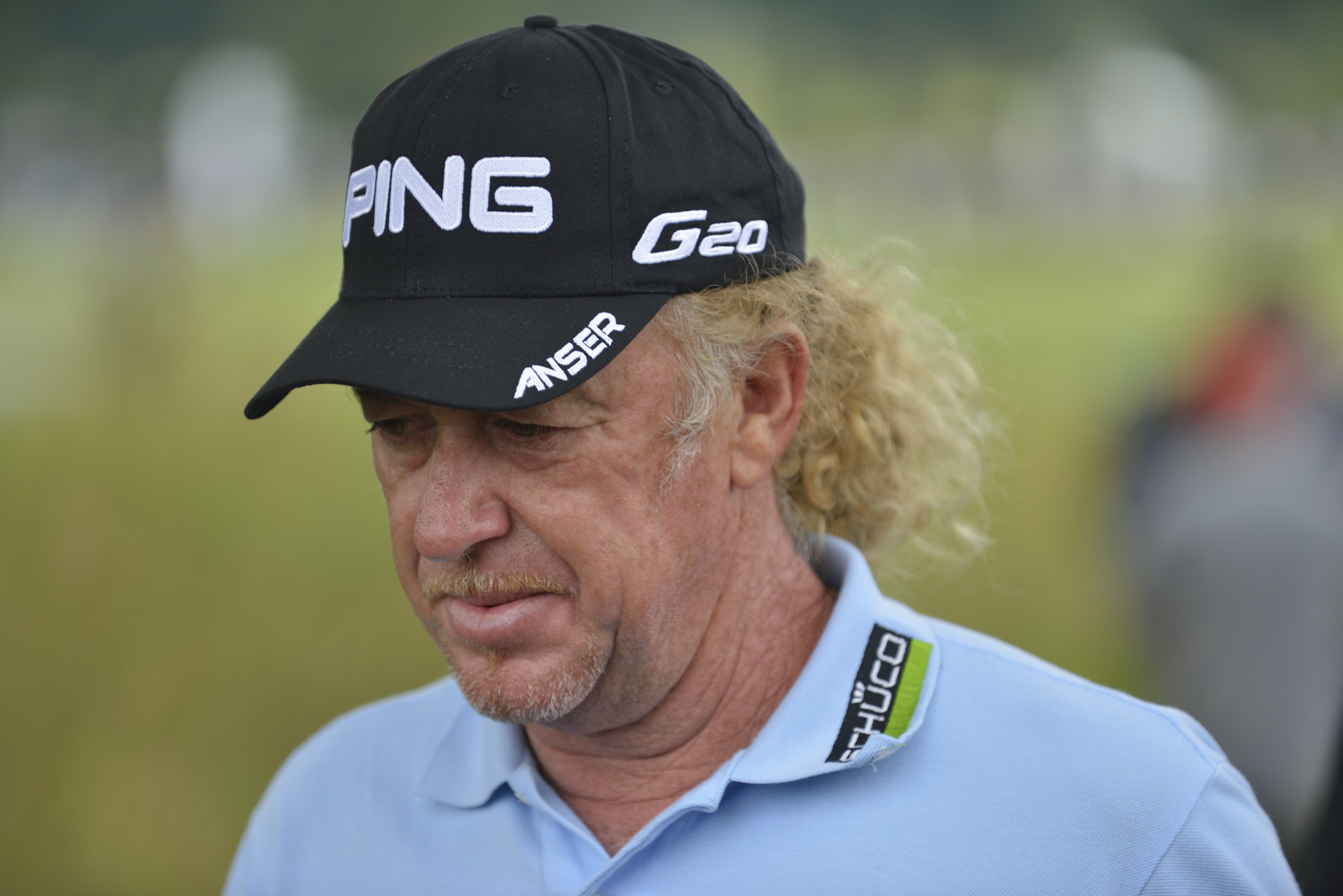
- Jiménez in 2012

Personal information
- Full name: Miguel Ángel Jiménez Rodríguez
- Nickname: The Mechanic
- Nationality: Spain
- Born: 5 January 1964 (age 62) Málaga, Spain
- Height: 5 ft 10 in (1.78 m)
- Weight: 184 lb (83 kg; 13.1 st)
- Spouses: Montserrat Bravo Ramirez (m. 1991; div. 2010) Susanne Styblo (m. 2014)
- Children: Miguel Ángel, Victor

Career
- Sport: Golf
- Turned professional: 1982
- Current tours: European Tour; PGA Tour Champions; European Senior Tour
- Former tour: PGA Tour
- Professional wins: 45
- Highest ranking: 12 (5 December 2004)

Number of wins by tour
- European Tour: 21 (Tied-10th all-time)
- Asian Tour: 7 (Tied-9th all-time)
- PGA Tour of Australasia: 1
- Challenge Tour: 1
- PGA Tour Champions: 17
- European Senior Tour: 1
- Other: 7

Best results in major championships
- Masters Tournament: 4th: 2014
- PGA Championship: T10: 1999
- U.S. Open: T2: 2000
- The Open Championship: T3: 2001

Miguel Ángel Jiménez Rodríguez (born 5 January 1964) is a Spanish professional golfer. He has won 21 times on the European Tour, holds the records for the most starts on the European Tour and being the first player over 50 to win on the European Tour (2014 Open de Espana at age 50 years and 133 days) and has been a member of two victorious Ryder Cup teams.

== Career ==
Born in Málaga in southern Spain, Jiménez first played on the European Tour in 1988 and improved steadily over the next few seasons. His first win on the tour came at the Piaget Belgian Open in 1992. During a fairly up and down career, he has so far had four main periods of success. He has finished inside the top 100 on the European Tour Order of Merit every season since 1989. In 1994 he finished fifth on the European Tour Order of Merit. One highlight was scoring an exceptionally rare albatross (double eagle) on the 17th hole at Valderrama, during the 1994 Volvo Masters, sinking his second shot on the par-5 hole with a 3-iron.

After some weaker seasons he bounced back in 1998 and 1999, finishing fourth on the Order of Merit in consecutive years and winning four tournaments including the prestigious Volvo Masters. In 1999 he also came in second in the WGC-American Express Championship, which is one of the elite World Golf Championships events, and made his Ryder Cup debut.

In 2004, Jiménez once again bounced back from some modest seasons, notching up another fourth-place finish on the Order of Merit, and winning four European Tour events, which was more than any other player. He maintained his form into 2005, winning the Omega Hong Kong Open, which is a European Tour event, and the Celtic Manor Wales Open. He has featured in the top 20 of the Official World Golf Rankings. Jiménez has had great success in team events representing Europe and Spain, winning the Alfred Dunhill Cup in 1999 and 2000, the Seve Trophy in 2000 and the Ryder Cup in 2004 and 2010.

In 2005, Jiménez won the Spanish Pairs final, with Andrés Jiménez at La Cala Resort in Andalucia, Spain.

2008 proved to be another good season with two wins, including the BMW PGA Championship at Wentworth, in which he beat Oliver Wilson in a play-off. His form earned Jiménez a spot on the 2008 Ryder Cup team. He finished the season ranked fourth on the Order of Merit once more.

While defending his BMW PGA Championship title in 2009, Jiménez scored a rare albatross (double eagle) by holing a 206-yard (188 m) six-iron on his second shot on the par-five fourth. It was the second such feat of his competitive career.

In February 2010, Jiménez won the Omega Dubai Desert Classic, beating Lee Westwood in a playoff and in July added the Alstom Open de France, beating Alejandro Cañizares and Francesco Molinari on the first hole of a playoff. He won his third event of the year at the Omega European Masters, finishing three strokes ahead of Edoardo Molinari

Jiménez was named as Europe's fourth assistant captain for the Ryder Cup in 2012. Later in 2012 he won his 19th European Tour event at the UBS Hong Kong Open, and in doing so became the oldest ever winner on the European Tour.

While skiing in southern Spain on 29 December 2012, Jiménez fell and suffered a right tibial plateau fracture, which required surgery and kept him out of competition for several months. He played in the Open de España in April 2013 but missed the cut and returned to the European Tour in late May. In July, Jiménez was the 36-hole leader at The Open Championship. Later that summer, he lost a playoff to Joost Luiten at the KLM Open. In December 2013 Jiménez retained his Hong Kong Open title and broke his own record as the European Tour's oldest winner.

On 18 April 2014, Jiménez made his Champions Tour debut by shooting a course record 65 at the Greater Gwinnett Championship. Jiménez went on to win the tournament by two shots over Bernhard Langer.

Exactly one month later, Jiménez again extended his record as the then oldest winner on the European Tour at 50 years and 133 days. By winning, he secured his first triumph in the Open de España in his 27th time appearance at the event. Jiménez's up-and-down par on the first playoff hole defeated Richard Green and Thomas Pieters. The win was Jiménez's 14th since turning 40 and tied him for 10th all-time among golfers with the most European Tour victories. His record as the oldest winner on tour was eventually broken by Phil Mickelson who won the 2021 PGA Championship at 50 years and 341 days.

In January 2015, Jiménez won his second Champions Tour event at the Mitsubishi Electric Championship at Hualalai. On 23 May 2015, Jiménez aced the par-3 second hole during the BMW PGA Championship at the Wentworth Club, his tenth hole-in-one on the European Tour, which broke the record he jointly held with Colin Montgomerie. The ace was Jiménez's third of the season. He went on to finish joint second in the tournament.

In April 2016, Jiménez won for the third time on the Champions Tour, with a two-stroke victory at the Mississippi Gulf Resort Classic over Scott Dunlap. In April 2017, Jiménez repeated as champion at the Mississippi Gulf Resort Classic.

In May 2018, Jiménez won a major title on the PGA Tour Champions by winning the Regions Tradition. In July 2018, Jiménez won another major title on the PGA Tour Champions by winning the Senior Open Championship at the Old Course at St Andrews.

On 17 February 2019, Jiménez won the Chubb Classic on the PGA Tour Champions, with a playoff victory over Bernhard Langer and Olin Browne. This victory was his 7th career title on the PGA Tour Champions. On 21 October 2019, Jiménez won the Dominion Energy Charity Classic on the PGA Tour Champions. He won with a final round of 63.

On 19 January 2020, Jiménez won the season-opening Mitsubishi Electric Championship at Hualalai on the PGA Tour Champions over Ernie Els and Fred Couples in a sudden death playoff.

At the 2020 Hero Open, Jiménez passed Sam Torrance for most starts on the European Tour, with 707. Jimenez ended 2024 with 723 career European Tour starts.

On 22 January 2022, Jiménez won the season-opening Mitsubishi Electric Championship at Hualalai on the PGA Tour Champions for a third time. Jiménez won over Steven Alker in a sudden death playoff.

On 27 February 2022, Jiménez won the Cologuard Classic in Arizona on PGA Tour Champions. This marked his second win in three events. Jiménez made two holes-in-one in the three round tournament.

Jiménez earned his 14th PGA Tour Champions win at the 2025 Trophy Hassan II.

== Personal life ==
Jiménez is known as "The Mechanic" despite his preference for driving, rather than repairing, high-performance vehicles, especially his red Ferrari.

After the winner's press conference following the 2014 Open de España, Jiménez was asked the secret of his longevity. He stated, "There is no secret. Good food, good wine, good cigars and some exercise!"

== Professional wins (45) ==
=== European Tour wins (21) ===
Legend
Flagship events (1)
Tour Championships (1)
Other European Tour (19)

| No. | Date | Tournament | Winning score | To par | Margin of victory | Runner(s)-up |
|---|---|---|---|---|---|---|
| 1 | 27 Sep 1992 | Piaget Belgian Open | 71-70-64-69=274 | −10 | 3 strokes | (England) Barry Lane |
| 2 | 24 Jul 1994 | Heineken Dutch Open | 65-68-67-70=270 | −18 | 2 strokes | (England) Howard Clark |
| 3 | 10 May 1998 | Turespaña Masters Open Baleares | 69-68-70-72=279 | −9 | 2 strokes | (Spain) Miguel Ángel Martín |
| 4 | 20 Sep 1998 | Trophée Lancôme | 67-70-67-69=273 | −11 | 2 strokes | (United States) David Duval, (United States) Mark O'Meara, (Sweden) Jarmo Sandelin, (New Zealand) Greg Turner |
| 5 | 14 Mar 1999 | Turespaña Masters - Open Andalucía (2) | 69-66-62-67=264 | −24 | 4 strokes | (England) Steve Webster |
| 6 | 31 Oct 1999 | Volvo Masters | 68-67-69-65=269 | −19 | 2 strokes | (South Africa) Retief Goosen, (Republic of Ireland) Pádraig Harrington, (Germany) Bernhard Langer |
| 7 | 19 Oct 2003 | Turespaña Mallorca Classic^{1} | 72-67-65=204 (Note: Shortened to 54 holes due to weather.) | −9 | 1 stroke | (Spain) José María Olazábal |
| 8 | 1 Feb 2004 | Johnnie Walker Classic^{2,3} | 70-66-67-68=271 | −17 | 2 strokes | (Denmark) Thomas Bjørn, (India) Jyoti Randhawa |
| 9 | 4 Apr 2004 | Algarve Open de Portugal | 69-66-70-67=272 | −16 | 2 strokes | (Australia) Terry Price |
| 10 | 16 May 2004 | BMW Asian Open^{2} | 71-66-70-67=274 | −14 | 3 strokes | (England) Simon Dyson |
| 11 | 29 Aug 2004 | BMW International Open | 68-66-67-66=267 | −21 | 2 strokes | (France) Thomas Levet |
| 12 | 5 Dec 2004 (2005 season) | Omega Hong Kong Open^{2} | 65-64-71-66=266 | −14 | 1 stroke | (Republic of Ireland) Pádraig Harrington, (South Africa) James Kingston |
| 13 | 5 Jun 2005 | Celtic Manor Wales Open | 63-67-70-62=262 | −14 | 4 strokes | (Sweden) Martin Erlandsson, (Spain) José Manuel Lara |
| 14 | 18 Nov 2007 (2008 season) | UBS Hong Kong Open^{2} (2) | 65-67-66-67=265 | −15 | 1 stroke | (South Korea) K. J. Choi, (Sweden) Robert Karlsson, (Thailand) Thongchai Jaidee |
| 15 | 25 May 2008 | BMW PGA Championship | 70-67-72-68=277 | −11 | Playoff | (England) Oliver Wilson |
| 16 | 7 Feb 2010 | Omega Dubai Desert Classic | 70-67-68-72=277 | −11 | Playoff | (England) Lee Westwood |
| 17 | 4 Jul 2010 | Alstom Open de France | 71-69-66-67=273 | −11 | Playoff | (Spain) Alejandro Cañizares, (Italy) Francesco Molinari |
| 18 | 5 Sep 2010 | Omega European Masters^{2} | 67-61-68-67=263 | −21 | 3 strokes | (Italy) Edoardo Molinari |
| 19 | 18 Nov 2012 | UBS Hong Kong Open^{2} (3) | 65-67-68-65=265 | −15 | 1 stroke | (Sweden) Fredrik Andersson Hed |
| 20 | 8 Dec 2013 (2014 season) | Hong Kong Open^{2} (4) | 70-67-65-66=268 | −12 | Playoff | (Wales) Stuart Manley, (Thailand) Prom Meesawat |
| 21 | 18 May 2014 | Open de España | 69-73-69-73=284 | −4 | Playoff | (Australia) Richard Green, (Belgium) Thomas Pieters |

^{1}Dual-ranking event with the Challenge Tour
^{2}Co-sanctioned by the Asian Tour
^{3}Co-sanctioned by the PGA Tour of Australasia

European Tour playoff record (5–3)

| No. | Year | Tournament | Opponent(s) | Result |
|---|---|---|---|---|
| 1 | 1994 | Honda Open | (Australia) Robert Allenby | Lost to par on third extra hole |
| 2 | 1999 | WGC-American Express Championship | (United States) Tiger Woods | Lost to birdie on first extra hole |
| 3 | 2008 | BMW PGA Championship | (England) Oliver Wilson | Won with birdie on second extra hole |
| 4 | 2010 | Omega Dubai Desert Classic | (England) Lee Westwood | Won with par on third extra hole |
| 5 | 2010 | Alstom Open de France | (Spain) Alejandro Cañizares, (Italy) Francesco Molinari | Won with par on first extra hole |
| 6 | 2013 | KLM Open | (Netherlands) Joost Luiten | Lost to par on first extra hole |
| 7 | 2013 | Hong Kong Open | (Wales) Stuart Manley, (Thailand) Prom Meesawat | Won with birdie on first extra hole |
| 8 | 2014 | Open de España | (Australia) Richard Green, (Belgium) Thomas Pieters | Won with par on first extra hole |

=== Asian Tour wins (7) ===
| No. | Date | Tournament | Winning score | To par | Margin of victory | Runner(s)-up |
|---|---|---|---|---|---|---|
| 1 | 1 Feb 2004 | Johnnie Walker Classic^{1,2} | 70-66-67-68=271 | −17 | 2 strokes | (Denmark) Thomas Bjørn, (India) Jyoti Randhawa |
| 2 | 16 May 2004 | BMW Asian Open^{1} | 71-66-70-67=274 | −14 | 3 strokes | (England) Simon Dyson |
| 3 | 5 Dec 2004 | Omega Hong Kong Open^{1} | 65-64-71-66=266 | −14 | 1 stroke | (Republic of Ireland) Pádraig Harrington, (South Africa) James Kingston |
| 4 | 18 Nov 2007 | UBS Hong Kong Open^{1} (2) | 65-67-66-67=265 | −15 | 1 stroke | (South Korea) K. J. Choi, (Sweden) Robert Karlsson, (Thailand) Thongchai Jaidee |
| 5 | 5 Sep 2010 | Omega European Masters^{1} | 67-61-68-67=263 | −21 | 3 strokes | (Italy) Edoardo Molinari |
| 6 | 18 Nov 2012 | UBS Hong Kong Open^{1} (3) | 65-67-68-65=265 | −15 | 1 stroke | (Sweden) Fredrik Andersson Hed |
| 7 | 8 Dec 2013 | Hong Kong Open^{1} (4) | 70-67-65-66=268 | −12 | Playoff | (Thailand) Prom Meesawat, (Wales) Stuart Manley |

^{1}Co-sanctioned by the European Tour
^{2}Co-sanctioned by the PGA Tour of Australasia

Asian Tour playoff record (1–0)

| No. | Year | Tournament | Opponents | Result |
|---|---|---|---|---|
| 1 | 2013 | Hong Kong Open | (Thailand) Prom Meesawat, (Wales) Stuart Manley | Won with birdie on first extra hole |

=== Other wins (7) ===
- 1988 Open de l'Informatique (France)
- 1989 Benson & Hedges Trophy (with Xonia Wunsch-Ruiz)
- 1999 Oki Telepizza – Olivia Nova (Spain)
- 1999 Spanish Professional Closed Championship
- 2002 Spanish Professional Closed Championship
- 2003 Spanish Professional Closed Championship
- 2006 Spanish Professional Closed Championship

=== PGA Tour Champions wins (17) ===
Legend
PGA Tour Champions major championships (3)
Charles Schwab Cup playoff events (1)
Other PGA Tour Champions (13)

| No. | Date | Tournament | Winning score | To par | Margin of victory | Runner(s)-up |
|---|---|---|---|---|---|---|
| 1 | 20 Apr 2014 | Greater Gwinnett Championship | 65-70-67=202 | −14 | 2 strokes | (Germany) Bernhard Langer |
| 2 | 25 Jan 2015 | Mitsubishi Electric Championship at Hualalai | 69-64-66=199 | −17 | 1 stroke | (United States) Mark O'Meara |
| 3 | 3 Apr 2016 | Mississippi Gulf Resort Classic | 68-70-64=202 | −14 | 2 strokes | (United States) Scott Dunlap |
| 4 | 2 Apr 2017 | Mississippi Gulf Resort Classic (2) | 67-66-70=203 | −13 | Playoff | (United States) Gene Sauers |
| 5 | 20 May 2018 | Regions Tradition | 64-69-66-70=269 | −19 | 3 strokes | (United States) Joe Durant, (United States) Gene Sauers, (United States) Steve Stricker |
| 6 | 29 Jul 2018 | The Senior Open Championship | 68-67-72-69=276 | −12 | 1 stroke | (Germany) Bernhard Langer |
| 7 | 17 Feb 2019 | Chubb Classic | 68-66-66=200 | −13 | Playoff | (United States) Olin Browne, (Germany) Bernhard Langer |
| 8 | 21 Oct 2019 | Dominion Energy Charity Classic | 67-68-63=198 | −18 | 2 strokes | (United States) Tommy Tolles |
| 9 | 18 Jan 2020 | Mitsubishi Electric Championship at Hualalai (2) | 64-71-67=202 | −14 | Playoff | (United States) Fred Couples, (South Africa) Ernie Els |
| 10 | 13 Sep 2020 | Sanford International | 65-66-65=196 | −14 | 1 stroke | (United States) Steve Flesch |
| 11 | 22 Jan 2022 | Mitsubishi Electric Championship at Hualalai (3) | 67-66-66=199 | −17 | Playoff | (New Zealand) Steven Alker |
| 12 | 27 Feb 2022 | Cologuard Classic | 66-67-65=198 | −18 | 4 strokes | (United States) Woody Austin, (Germany) Bernhard Langer |
| 13 | 14 Aug 2022 | Boeing Classic | 70-64-67=201 | −15 | 2 strokes | (Australia) David McKenzie |
| 14 | 8 Feb 2025 | Trophy Hassan II | 70-69-69=208 | −11 | 2 strokes | (New Zealand) Steven Alker |
| 15 | 23 Mar 2025 | Hoag Classic | 67-64-67=198 | −15 | 1 stroke | (United States) Stewart Cink, (Sweden) Freddie Jacobson |
| 16 | 1 Jun 2025 | Principal Charity Classic | 63-66-70=199 | −17 | Playoff | (Denmark) Søren Kjeldsen, (Australia) Cameron Percy |
| 17 | 22 Jun 2025 | Kaulig Companies Championship | 70-66-66-68=270 | −10 | Playoff | (New Zealand) Steven Alker |

PGA Tour Champions playoff record (6–4)

| No. | Year | Tournament | Opponent(s) | Result |
|---|---|---|---|---|
| 1 | 2016 | 3M Championship | (United States) Joe Durant | Lost to eagle on first extra hole |
| 2 | 2017 | Mississippi Gulf Resort Classic | (United States) Gene Sauers | Won with birdie on first extra hole |
| 3 | 2017 | PowerShares QQQ Championship | (Germany) Bernhard Langer | Lost to birdie on second extra hole |
| 4 | 2019 | Chubb Classic | (United States) Olin Browne, (Germany) Bernhard Langer | Won with par on first extra hole |
| 5 | 2020 | Mitsubishi Electric Championship at Hualalai | (United States) Fred Couples, (South Africa) Ernie Els | Won with birdie on second extra hole Couples eliminated by par on first hole |
| 6 | 2021 | SAS Championship | (United States) Lee Janzen | Lost to birdie on first extra hole |
| 7 | 2022 | Mitsubishi Electric Championship at Hualalai | (New Zealand) Steven Alker | Won with par on second extra hole |
| 8 | 2025 | Principal Charity Classic | (Denmark) Søren Kjeldsen, (Australia) Cameron Percy | Won with birdie on first extra hole |
| 9 | 2025 | Kaulig Companies Championship | (New Zealand) Steven Alker | Won with birdie on second extra hole |
| 10 | 2026 | Boeing Classic | (United States) Stewart Cink | Lost to birdie on first extra hole |

=== European Senior Tour wins (1) ===
Legend
Senior major championships (1)
Other European Senior Tour (0)

| No. | Date | Tournament | Winning score | To par | Margin of victory | Runner-up |
|---|---|---|---|---|---|---|
| 1 | 29 Jul 2018 | The Senior Open Championship | 68-67-72-69=276 | −12 | 1 stroke | (Germany) Bernhard Langer |

European Senior Tour playoff record (0–1)

| No. | Year | Tournament | Opponent | Result |
|---|---|---|---|---|
| 1 | 2018 | Costa Blanca Benidorm Senior Golf Masters | (England) Paul Streeter | Lost to birdie on first extra hole |

== Playoff record ==
PGA Tour playoff record (0–1)

| No. | Year | Tournament | Opponent | Result |
|---|---|---|---|---|
| 1 | 1999 | WGC-American Express Championship | (United States) Tiger Woods | Lost to birdie on first extra hole |

== Results in major championships ==
| Tournament | 1991 | 1992 | 1993 | 1994 | 1995 | 1996 | 1997 | 1998 | 1999 |
|---|---|---|---|---|---|---|---|---|---|
| Masters Tournament | | | | | CUT | | | | CUT |
| U.S. Open | | | | | T28 | | | | T23 |
| The Open Championship | T80 | | T51 | CUT | T88 | CUT | CUT | DQ | CUT |
| PGA Championship | | | | | T13 | T24 | | | T10 |

| Tournament | 2000 | 2001 | 2002 | 2003 | 2004 | 2005 | 2006 | 2007 | 2008 | 2009 |
|---|---|---|---|---|---|---|---|---|---|---|
| Masters Tournament | T49 | T10 | T9 | CUT | | T31 | T11 | T44 | T8 | T46 |
| U.S. Open | T2 | CUT | | | CUT | CUT | T16 | | T6 | CUT |
| The Open Championship | T26 | T3 | CUT | | T47 | T52 | T41 | T12 | CUT | T13 |
| PGA Championship | T64 | CUT | | | T31 | T40 | T65 | CUT | CUT | T36 |

| Tournament | 2010 | 2011 | 2012 | 2013 | 2014 | 2015 | 2016 | 2017 | 2018 |
|---|---|---|---|---|---|---|---|---|---|
| Masters Tournament | T12 | T27 | 56 | | 4 | CUT | | | |
| U.S. Open | CUT | CUT | CUT | | CUT | CUT | | | |
| The Open Championship | T27 | T25 | T9 | T13 | CUT | CUT | T18 | | |
| PGA Championship | CUT | T64 | T27 | T29 | CUT | CUT | | | |

| Tournament | 2019 |
|---|---|
| Masters Tournament | |
| PGA Championship | |
| U.S. Open | |
| The Open Championship | CUT |

Top 10
Did not play

CUT = missed the half-way cut
DQ = Disqualified
"T" = tied

=== Summary ===
| Tournament | Wins | 2nd | 3rd | Top-5 | Top-10 | Top-25 | Events | Cuts made |
|---|---|---|---|---|---|---|---|---|
| Masters Tournament | 0 | 0 | 0 | 1 | 4 | 6 | 16 | 12 |
| PGA Championship | 0 | 0 | 0 | 0 | 1 | 3 | 17 | 11 |
| U.S. Open | 0 | 1 | 0 | 1 | 2 | 4 | 14 | 5 |
| The Open Championship | 0 | 0 | 1 | 1 | 2 | 7 | 25 | 15 |
| Totals | 0 | 1 | 1 | 3 | 9 | 20 | 72 | 43 |

- Most consecutive cuts made – 6 (1999 PGA – 2001 Masters)
- Longest streak of top-10s – 2 (twice)

== Results in The Players Championship ==
| Tournament | 1999 | 2000 | 2001 | 2002 | 2003 | 2004 | 2005 | 2006 | 2007 | 2008 |
|---|---|---|---|---|---|---|---|---|---|---|
| The Players Championship | T38 | CUT | CUT | CUT | | | T46 | T38 | | T32 |

Did not play

CUT = missed the halfway cut
"T" indicates a tie for a place

== Results in World Golf Championships ==
Results not in chronological order before 2015.

| Tournament | 1999 | 2000 | 2001 | 2002 | 2003 | 2004 | 2005 | 2006 | 2007 | 2008 | 2009 | 2010 | 2011 | 2012 | 2013 | 2014 | 2015 |
|---|---|---|---|---|---|---|---|---|---|---|---|---|---|---|---|---|---|
| Championship | 2 | T25 | NT^{1} | | | T16 | T41 | | | T26 | | T63 | T55 | T45 | | T13 | |
| Match Play | R64 | QF | | | | R64 | R32 | R32 | R64 | R64 | R32 | R64 | QF | R16 | | R64 | T34 |
| Invitational | T27 | 36 | T36 | | | T27 | 57 | T54 | | T10 | T6 | T22 | 72 | | T4 | T45 | |
| Champions | | | | | | | | | | | | T41 | T38 | | 72 | 71 | T46 |

^{1}Cancelled due to 9/11

Top 10
Did not play

QF, R16, R32, R64 = Round in which player lost in match play
"T" = Tied
NT = No tournament
Note that the HSBC Champions did not become a WGC event until 2009.

== Senior major championships ==
=== Wins (3) ===
| Year | Championship | 54 holes | Winning score | Margin | Runner(s)-up |
|---|---|---|---|---|---|
| 2018 | Regions Tradition | 3 shot lead | −19 (64-69-66-70=269) | 3 strokes | (United States) Joe Durant, (United States) Gene Sauers, (United States) Steve Stricker |
| 2018 | The Senior Open Championship | Tied for lead | −12 (68-67-72-69=276) | 1 stroke | (Germany) Bernhard Langer |
| 2025 | Kaulig Companies Championship | Tied for lead | −10 (70-66-66-68=270) | Playoff | (New Zealand) Steven Alker |

=== Results timeline ===
Results not in chronological order

| Tournament | 2014 | 2015 | 2016 | 2017 | 2018 | 2019 | 2020 | 2021 | 2022 | 2023 | 2024 | 2025 | 2026 |
|---|---|---|---|---|---|---|---|---|---|---|---|---|---|
| Senior PGA Championship | | | | T3 | 5 | | NT | T8 | T4 | T5 | T43 | T11 | T8 |
| The Tradition | | | | T20 | 1 | T37 | NT | T19 | T3 | T5 | T32 | T9 | T30 |
| U.S. Senior Open | | T17 | T2 | T18 | T2 | T6 | NT | T8 | T7 | T14 | T48 | 3 | T8 |
| Senior Players Championship | | | T2 | 4 | T10 | T13 | T3 | T37 | T11 | T13 | T33 | 1 | T8 |
| The Senior Open Championship | T8 | 4 | T3 | T11 | 1 | T10 | NT | 2 | T29 | T25 | CUT | T24 | T14 |

Win
Top 10
Did not play

CUT = missed the halfway cut
"T" indicates a tie for a place
NT = no tournament due to COVID-19 pandemic

== Team appearances ==
- Alfred Dunhill Cup (representing Spain): 1990, 1992, 1993, 1994, 1995, 1996, 1997, 1998, 1999 (winners), 2000 (winners)
- World Cup (representing Spain): 1990, 1992, 1993, 1994, 2000, 2001, 2003, 2004, 2005, 2006, 2007, 2008, 2011, 2013
- Ryder Cup (representing Europe): 1999, 2004 (winners), 2008, 2010 (winners)
- Seve Trophy (representing Continental Europe): 2000 (winners), 2002, 2003, 2005, 2007, 2009, 2011, 2013 (winners)
- Royal Trophy (representing Europe): 2012
- EurAsia Cup (representing Europe): 2014 (playing captain)

== See also ==
- List of golfers with most European Tour wins
- List of golfers with most Asian Tour wins
- List of golfers with most PGA Tour Champions wins
