= Ken Tanigawa =

American professional golfer (born 1967)

Personal information
- Nationality: United States
- Born: December 26, 1967 (age 58) Kobe, Japan
- Weight: 185 lb (84 kg)

Career
- Sport: Golf
- College: University of California, Los Angeles
- Turned professional: 1990, (Note: Amateur status reinstated in 2010.) 2018
- Current tour: PGA Tour Champions
- Former tours: Japan Golf Tour; Nationwide Tour; Gateway Tour
- Professional wins: 5

Number of wins by tour
- PGA Tour Champions: 3
- Other: 2

Best results in major championships
- Masters Tournament: DNP
- PGA Championship: CUT: 2020
- U.S. Open: DNP
- The Open Championship: DNP

Achievements and awards
- PGA Tour Champions Rookie of the Year: 2018

Ken Tanigawa (born December 26, 1967) is an American professional golfer.

== Early life and amateur career ==
Tanigawa was born in Kobe, Japan. He played college golf at UCLA. In 1990, he graduated.

== Professional career ==
In 1990, Tanigawa turned professional. In 1991, he played on the Ben Hogan Tour and again in 2003. His best finish was T-41 at the 2003 Price Cutter Charity Championship. He played on the Japan Golf Tour in 1996 and 1997 with a best finish of T-9 at the 1996 Mitsubishi Galant Tournament.

== Re-instated amateur career ==
Tanigawa quit playing professionally and was re-instated as an amateur. He won a number of amateur tournaments in Arizona in the mid-2010s.

== Second professional career ==
Tanigawa qualified for the 2018 PGA Tour Champions via qualifying school, competing as an amateur and turning professional again in 2018. He won on the tour at the PURE Insurance Championship in September 2018.

In January 2019, Tanigawa was awarded the 2018 PGA Tour Champions Rookie of the Year award.

On May 26, 2019, Tanigawa won a senior major tournament, the KitchenAid Senior PGA Championship at Oak Hill Country Club in Rochester, New York. Tanigawa came from three strokes behind in the final round and holed a 10-foot par putt on the 72nd hole to edge out Scott McCarron and claim victory by a single stroke.

== Awards and honors ==
In 2018, Tanigawa was named the PGA Tour Champions Rookie of the Year.

== Amateur wins ==
- 2014 Arizona Mid-Amateur
- 2015 Arizona Amateur, Arizona Mid-Amateur
- 2017 Arizona Amateur

== Professional wins (5) ==
=== Gateway Tour wins (1) ===
No.	Date	Tournament	Winning score	To par	Margin of victory	Runners-up
1	Aug 1, 2002	Learning 2000 Classic	66-68-68=202	−14	2 strokes	(United States) Mike Louden, (United States) Rob Rashell

=== Other wins (1) ===
- 2000 Ohio Open

=== PGA Tour Champions wins (3) ===
Legend
Senior major championships (1)
Other PGA Tour Champions (2)

No.	Date	Tournament	Winning score	To par	Margin of victory	Runner(s)-up
1	Sep 29, 2018	PURE Insurance Championship	67-66-72=205	−10	1 stroke	(United States) Marco Dawson, (United States) Kirk Triplett
2	May 26, 2019	KitchenAid Senior PGA Championship	67-74-66-70=277	−3	1 stroke	(United States) Scott McCarron
3	Aug 18, 2024	Rogers Charity Classic	68-61-64=193	−17	2 strokes	(Australia) Richard Green

== Results in major championships ==
Tournament	2020
PGA Championship	CUT

CUT = missed the halfway cut
Note: Tanigawa only played in the PGA Championship.

== Senior major championships ==
=== Wins (1) ===
Year	Championship	54 holes	Winning score	Margin	Runner-up
2019	KitchenAid Senior PGA Championship	3 shot deficit	−3 (67-74-66-70=277)	1 stroke	(United States) Scott McCarron

=== Results timeline ===
Results not in chronological order

Tournament	2018	2019	2020	2021	2022	2023	2024	2025	2026
Senior PGA Championship	T23	1	NT	CUT	CUT	T20	T43	T51	CUT
The Tradition		T57	NT	T29	T18		T60	T67	T11
U.S. Senior Open	T40	T33	NT	CUT	T18	T42	CUT	CUT	T31
Senior Players Championship	T20	T63	T33	T37	49	T53	T70	T18	T65
The Senior Open Championship		T76	NT	T24	CUT	T57	T64	T47	CUT

Win
Did not play

CUT = missed the halfway cut
"T" indicates a tie for a place
NT = no tournament due to COVID-19 pandemic
