= 2008 World Cup (men's golf) =

Coordinates: 22°47′9″N 114°0′25″E

Tournament information
- Dates: 27–30 November
- Location: Shenzhen, China
- Courses: Mission Hills Golf Club, Olazabal course
- Format: 72 holes stroke play (best ball & alternate shot)

Statistics
- Par: 72
- Length: 7,320 yards (6,690 m)
- Field: 28 two-man teams
- Cut: None
- Prize fund: US$5.0 million
- Winner's share: US$1.6 million

Champion
- Sweden; Robert Karlsson & Henrik Stenson
- 261 (−27)

The 2008 Omega Mission Hills World Cup took place from 27 November to 30 November at Mission Hills Golf Club in Shenzhen, China. It was the 54th World Cup. 28 countries competed and each country sent two players. The team purse was $5,000,000 with $1,600,000 going to the winner. The Swedish team of Robert Karlsson and Henrik Stenson won the tournament. This was the second time that Sweden won the World Cup.

== Qualification and format ==
The leading 18 available players from the Official World Golf Ranking on 1 September 2008 qualified. These 18 players then selected a player from their country to compete with them. The person they pick had to be ranked within the top 100 on the Official World Golf Ranking as of 1 September. If there was no other player from that country within the top 100 then the next highest ranked player would be their partner. If there was no other available player from that country within the top 500, then the exempt player could choose whoever he wants as long as they are a professional from the same country. World qualifiers were held in September and October. Nine countries earned their spot in the World Cup, three each from the European, Asian, and South American qualifiers. The host country, China, rounded out the field.

The event is a 72-hole stroke play team event with each team consisting of two players. The first and third days are four-ball play and the second and final days are foursomes play.

== Teams ==
| Country | Players |
|---|---|
| Australia | Richard Green and Brendan Jones |
| Canada | Graham DeLaet and Wes Heffernan |
| Chile | Felipe Aguilar and Mark Tullo |
| China | Liang Wenchong and Zhang Lianwei |
| Denmark | Anders Hansen and Søren Hansen |
| England | Ross Fisher and Ian Poulter |
| Finland | Roope Kakko and Mikko Korhonen |
| France | Grégory Bourdy and Grégory Havret |
| Germany | Alex Čejka and Martin Kaymer |
| Guatemala | Pablo Acuna and Alejandro Villavicencio |
| India | Jyoti Randhawa and Jeev Milkha Singh |
| Ireland | Graeme McDowell and Paul McGinley |
| Italy | Edoardo Molinari and Francesco Molinari |
| Japan | Ryuji Imada and Toru Taniguchi |

| Country | Players |
|---|---|
| Mexico | Daniel De Leon and Óscar Serna |
| New Zealand | Mark Brown and David Smail |
| Philippines | Mars Pucay and Angelo Que |
| Portugal | Tiago Cruz and Ricardo Santos |
| Scotland | Alastair Forsyth and Colin Montgomerie |
| South Africa | Rory Sabbatini and Richard Sterne |
| South Korea | Bae Sang-moon and Kim Hyung-tae |
| Spain | Miguel Ángel Jiménez and Pablo Larrazábal |
| Sweden | Robert Karlsson and Henrik Stenson |
| Taiwan | Lin Wen-tang and Lu Wen-teh |
| Thailand | Prayad Marksaeng and Thongchai Jaidee |
| United States | Ben Curtis and Brandt Snedeker |
| Venezuela | Miguel Martinez and Raul Sanz |
| Wales | Bradley Dredge and Richard Johnson |

- Source

== Scores ==
| Place | Country | Score | To par | Money (US$) |
|---|---|---|---|---|
| 1 | Sweden | 65-67-66-63=261 | −27 | 1,600,000 |
| 2 | Spain | 64-63-67-70=264 | −24 | 800,000 |
| T3 | Australia | 63-68-63-76=270 | −18 | 345,000 |
| T3 | Japan | 66-68-68-68=270 | −18 | 345,000 |
| 5 | Germany | 62-69-68-73=272 | −16 | 194,000 |
| 6 | England | 69-74-63-67=273 | −15 | 167,000 |
| T7 | South Africa | 70-70-67-67=274 | −14 | 141,500 |
| T7 | Thailand | 69-73-64-68=274 | −14 | 141,500 |
| 9 | United States | 64-69-69-73=275 | −13 | 116,000 |
| T10 | Chile | 67-76-66-67=276 | −12 | 92,000 |
| T10 | France | 68-75-62-71=276 | −12 | 92,000 |
| T10 | Philippines | 67-72-65-72=276 | −12 | 92,000 |
| T13 | Canada | 64-71-69-73=277 | −11 | 70,000 |
| T13 | Denmark | 65-75-64-73=277 | −11 | 70,000 |
| T13 | Portugal | 67-73-67-70=277 | −11 | 70,000 |
| 16 | Ireland | 65-68-68-77=278 | −10 | 63,000 |
| T17 | China | 69-75-64-72=280 | −8 | 60,000 |
| T17 | India | 67-72-70-71=280 | −8 | 60,000 |
| T19 | Italy | 70-73-64-74=281 | −7 | 56,000 |
| T19 | Scotland | 68-73-68-72=281 | −7 | 56,000 |
| 21 | Finland | 69-70-68-75=282 | −6 | 53,000 |
| T22 | Guatemala | 69-76-66-72=283 | −5 | 50,000 |
| T22 | New Zealand | 65-75-68-75=283 | −5 | 50,000 |
| 24 | Taiwan | 68-75-69-72=284 | −4 | 47,000 |
| 25 | Wales | 69-77-68-71=285 | −3 | 45,000 |
| 26 | South Korea | 68-70-71-78=287 | −1 | 43,000 |
| 27 | Mexico | 66-77-71-74=288 | E | 41,000 |
| 28 | Venezuela | 71-74-75-74=294 | +6 | 40,000 |
