= Robert Karlsson =

Swedish professional golfer (born 1969)

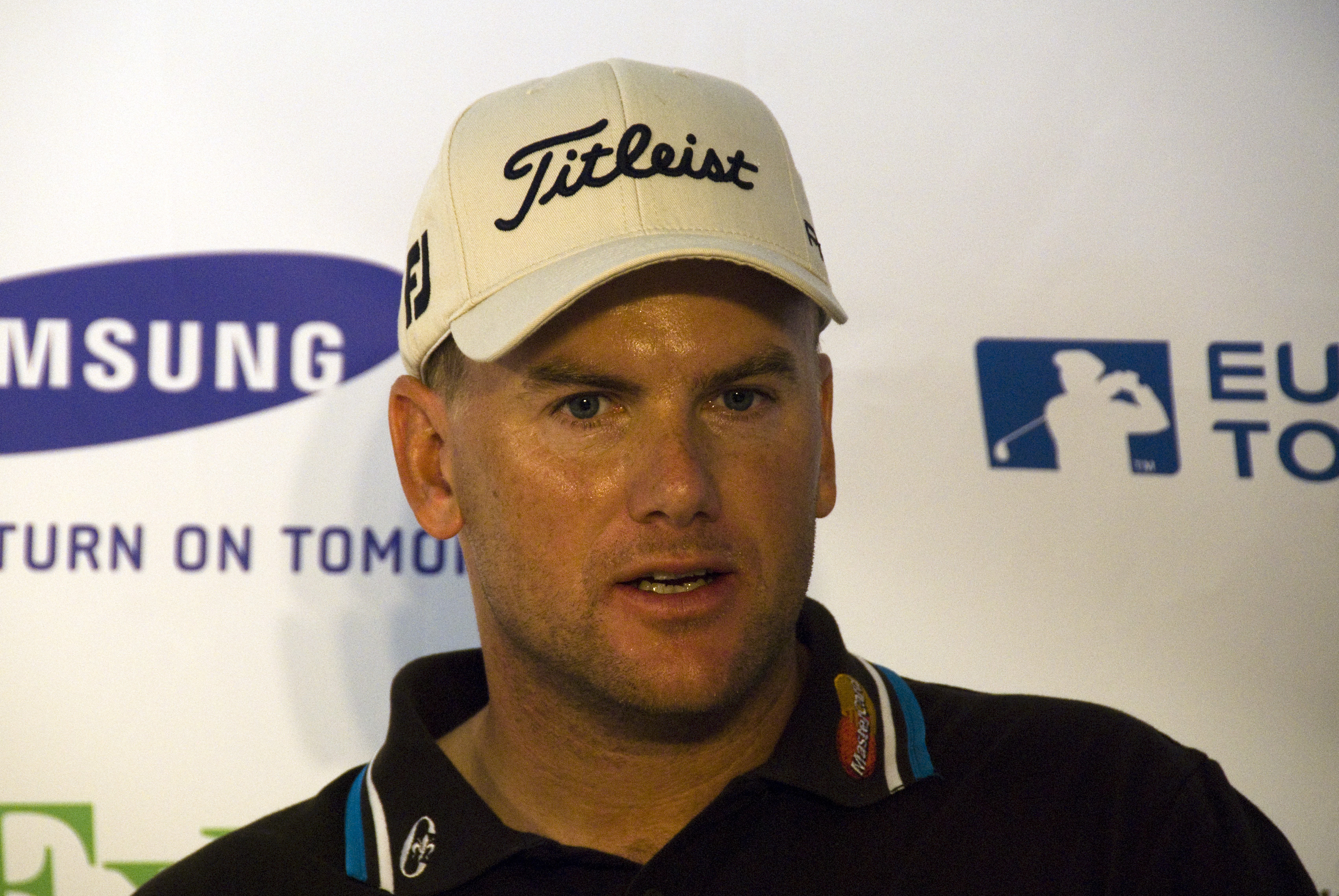

Personal information
- Full name: Robert Karlsson
- Nicknames: The Scientist, Robban
- Nationality: Sweden
- Born: 3 September 1969 (age 57) Katrineholm, Sweden
- Height: 1.96 m (6 ft 5 in)
- Weight: 95 kg (209 lb; 15.0 st)

Career
- Sport: Golf
- Turned professional: 1989
- Current tours: European Tour; PGA Tour Champions; European Senior Tour
- Former tour: PGA Tour
- Professional wins: 12
- Highest ranking: 6 (19 October 2008)

Number of wins by tour
- European Tour: 11
- Other: 1

Best results in major championships
- Masters Tournament: T8: 2008
- PGA Championship: T4: 2011
- U.S. Open: T4: 2008
- The Open Championship: T5: 1992

Achievements and awards
- European Tour Order of Merit winner: 2008
- Swedish Golfer of the Year: 2008, 2010
- Swedish Male Athlete of the Year: 2008

Robert Karlsson (born 3 September 1969) is a Swedish professional golfer who has played on the European Tour and the PGA Tour, and now plays on the PGA Tour Champions.

== Early life ==
Karlsson was born in Katrineholm, Sweden where his father Björn was a greenkeeper at the local golf club. His family lived close to the golf course, just next to the practice green, where Karlsson spent a lot of time. The green was later officially named "Robert's green", written on a plate on a stone nearby.

== Amateur career ==
As a 19-year-old amateur in 1989, Karlsson became the sixth Swedish player to complete all four rounds in The Open Championship, achieved at Royal Troon Golf Club, at his Open debut, playing the last round with defending Open champion Seve Ballesteros and tying Ballesteros at 76th place and second best amateur after sinking a 3-yard putt on the last hole.

The month before, Karlsson represented Sweden at the European Amateur Team Championship, at Royal Portcawl, Wales, and finished tied fourth individually with Peter McEvoy, England, in the stroke-play qualification competition.

== Professional career ==
He turned professional in late 1989 and qualified for membership of the European Tour at the 1990 Qualifying School. Since then he has retained his card and has had a steady career on tour, the highlight of which came in 2008 when he won the Order of Merit. He has finished in the top-20 of the Order of Merit seven times throughout his career and has won 11 events on tour.

With his win at the 1995 Turespaña Open Mediterrania in Spain, the 16th European Tour victory by a Swedish player, Karlsson became the 8th Swede to have won on the European Tour.

At the 2006 Celtic Manor Wales Open, Karlsson broke the European Tour's 36 hole and 54 hole scoring records by shooting 124 for the first two rounds and 189 for the first three. However, as the course was a par 69, which is rare at the top level, his to-par scores were less remarkable 14 under after two rounds and 18 under after three.

Karlsson's second victory of 2006 at the Deutsche Bank Players Championship of Europe in July helped him reach the top 50 of the Official World Golf Rankings and in 2008 he entered the top 25. His win at the Alfred Dunhill Links Championship took him to number 8 in October 2008. A T3 finish at the Portugal Masters two weeks later took him to number 6. He has spent over 25 weeks in the top-10 since 2008.

Karlsson was a member of the Continental Europe team in the Seve Trophy in 2000, 2002 and 2007. In 1999 he was eleventh on the Ryder Cup qualifying table just missing out on the last automatic place, and was not selected as a captain's pick. He made his Ryder Cup debut in 2006, at the age of 37, along with fellow Swede Henrik Stenson. He played again in 2008, forming a partnership with Pádraig Harrington in the foursomes and beating Justin Leonard 5 & 3 in the singles on Sunday.

After a strong finish to the season, Karlsson won the 2008 European Tour Order of Merit, being the first Swedish golfer to do so. He won the World Cup for Sweden with teammate Henrik Stenson in November 2008. The two of them finished second to United States at their try to defense in the event the year after.

In June 2009, Karlsson suffered from an eye injury, with no depth-perception in his left eye. It occurred during the week of the St. Jude Classic, the week before the U.S. Open, which Karlsson was set to play in, teeing off in the first round with fellow Swede Henrik Stenson. The eye injury caused Karlsson to withdraw from the event and he missed most of the rest of the 2009 season. He returned for The Vivendi Trophy toward the end of the season, and completed his recovery by claiming his tenth Tour title at the 2010 Commercialbank Qatar Masters the following January. In June, Karlsson lost in a sudden death playoff to Lee Westwood at the St. Jude Classic. In 2011, Karlsson was again in a playoff at the St. Jude Classic, where he lost to long-suffering veteran Harrison Frazar.

In May 2017, Thomas Bjørn selected Karlsson as his first vice-captain for the 2018 Ryder Cup, and in September 2019 Pádraig Harrington did the same for the 2020 Ryder Cup.

As Karlsson turned 50 in 2019, he became eligible for the PGA Tour Champions, and qualified for the 2020 season by finishing third at the PGA Tour Champions National Qualifying Tournament in December 2019. His first season on the Champions Tour was, due to the COVID-19 pandemic, prolonged through 2020 and 2021. In his first 23 events, he finished in the top-10 11 times, including two second-place finishes.

Karlsson is known as "The Scientist" for his contemplative and analytical style of play.

== Personal life ==
Karlsson was one of the tallest golfers on the European Tour at 6 ft 5 in (1.96 m). Like many leading Swedish golfers he lives outside his home country, formerly based himself in Monaco and in 2010 moved to Charlotte, North Carolina, United States.

Karlsson is a member of the "Champions for Peace" club, a group of 54 famous elite athletes committed to serving peace in the world through sport, created by Peace and Sport, a Monaco-based international organization.

In 2016, Karlsson supported the creating of a European Challenge Tour event at his old home club Katrineholm Golf Club in Sweden, Swedish Challenge hosted by Robert Karlsson. The tournament took place in 2016, 2017 and 2018. In 2020, the tournament came back and was part of the Swedish Golf Tour and Nordic Golf League.

== Awards and honors ==
- In 1995, he received Elit Sign number 102 by the Swedish Golf Federation based on national team appearances, national championship performances and world ranking achievements.
- In 2007, he was awarded honorary member of the PGA of Sweden.
- Being the first Swedish golfer to win the European Tour Order of Merit, resulted in him winning Swedish Male Athlete of the Year Award at the Swedish Sports Gala in January 2009, also a Swedish male golfer first.
- After the 2008 season, he also received the Swedish Golfer of the Year award, male and female, for the first time of two during his career.
- After winning the World Cup for Sweden in 2008 and finishing second in 2009, Karlsson and Henrik Stenson received The Team of the Year award at the Swedish Sports Gala in January 2010.
- In April 2025, Karlsson was elected in to the Swedish Golf Hall of Fame to be inducted at the Swedish Golf Museum in Landskrona, Sweden on July 18, 2025.

== Amateur wins ==
- 1988 Le Peugeut Classic (France)
- 1989 Le Peugeut Classic (France)

== Professional wins (12) ==
=== European Tour wins (11) ===
Legend
Tour Championships (1)
Other European Tour (10)

No.	Date	Tournament	Winning score	Margin of victory	Runner(s)-up
1	26 Feb 1995	Turespaña Open Mediterrania	−12 (64-69-71-72=276)	3 strokes	(Sweden) Anders Forsbrand, (Spain) Miguel Ángel Jiménez, (Sweden) Jarmo Sandelin, (Scotland) Sam Torrance
2	31 Aug 1997	BMW International Open	−24 (67-67-64-66=264)	Playoff	(England) Carl Watts
3	24 Oct 1999	Belgacom Open	−12 (69-68-69-66=272)	1 stroke	(South Africa) Retief Goosen, (England) Jamie Spence
4	22 Apr 2001	Via Digital Open de España	−11 (68-68-71-70=277)	2 strokes	(France) Jean-François Remésy
5	8 Sep 2002	Omega European Masters	−14 (65-66-68-71=270)	4 strokes	(South Africa) Trevor Immelman, (Scotland) Paul Lawrie
6	4 Jun 2006	Celtic Manor Wales Open	−16 (61-63-65-71=260)	3 strokes	(England) Paul Broadhurst
7	30 Jul 2006	Deutsche Bank Players Championship of Europe	−25 (64-66-66-67=263)	4 strokes	(South Africa) Charl Schwartzel, (England) Lee Westwood
8	14 Sep 2008	Mercedes-Benz Championship	−13 (67-69-68-71=275)	2 strokes	(Italy) Francesco Molinari
9	5 Oct 2008	Alfred Dunhill Links Championship	−10 (67-70-76-65=278)	Playoff	(England) Ross Fisher, (Germany) Martin Kaymer
10	31 Jan 2010	Commercialbank Qatar Masters	−15 (68-70-70-65=273)	3 strokes	(Spain) Álvaro Quirós
11	28 Nov 2010	Dubai World Championship	−14 (65-75-67-67=274)	Playoff	(England) Ian Poulter

European Tour playoff record (3–3)

No.	Year	Tournament	Opponent(s)	Result
1	1992	Moroccan Open	(England) David Gilford	Lost to birdie on third extra hole
2	1997	BMW International Open	(England) Carl Watts	Won with par on third extra hole
3	2001	Victor Chandler British Masters	(Sweden) Mathias Grönberg, (England) David Howell, (France) Thomas Levet	Levet won with birdie on third extra hole Howell and Karlsson eliminated by par on first hole
4	2006	EnterCard Scandinavian Masters	(Scotland) Marc Warren	Lost to par on second extra hole
5	2008	Alfred Dunhill Links Championship	(England) Ross Fisher, (Germany) Martin Kaymer	Won with birdie on first extra hole
6	2010	Dubai World Championship	(England) Ian Poulter	Won with birdie on second extra hole

=== Other wins (1) ===
No.	Date	Tournament	Winning score	Margin of victory	Runners-up
1	30 Nov 2008	Omega Mission Hills World Cup (with (Sweden) Henrik Stenson)	−27 (65-67-66-63=261)	3 strokes	Spain − Miguel Ángel Jiménez and Pablo Larrazábal

== Playoff record ==
PGA Tour playoff record (0–2)

No.	Year	Tournament	Opponent(s)	Result
1	2010	St. Jude Classic	(United States) Robert Garrigus, (England) Lee Westwood	Westwood won with birdie on fourth extra hole Garrigus eliminated by par on first hole
2	2011	FedEx St. Jude Classic	(United States) Harrison Frazar	Lost to par on third extra hole

Japan Golf Tour playoff record (0–1)

No.	Year	Tournament	Opponent	Result
1	2009	Dunlop Phoenix Tournament	(Italy) Edoardo Molinari	Lost to birdie on second extra hole

PGA Tour Champions playoff record (0–1)

No.	Year	Tournament	Opponent	Result
1	2022	Sanford International	(United States) Steve Stricker	Lost to birdie on first extra hole

== Results in major championships ==
Tournament	1989	1990	1991	1992	1993	1994	1995	1996	1997	1998	1999
Masters Tournament											
U.S. Open										CUT	
The Open Championship	T77			T5	CUT		CUT		CUT	CUT	CUT
PGA Championship										T65	T41

Tournament	2000	2001	2002	2003	2004	2005	2006	2007	2008	2009
Masters Tournament								T30	T8	CUT
U.S. Open			T45			CUT		CUT	T4	
The Open Championship	CUT	CUT	CUT				T35	CUT	T7	
PGA Championship		CUT		CUT			T29	T57	T20	

Tournament	2010	2011	2012	2013	2014
Masters Tournament	T43	T27	T50		
U.S. Open	T27	T45	T29	71	
The Open Championship	T14	CUT		CUT	T12
PGA Championship	T16	T4	CUT		T46

Top 10
Did not play

CUT = missed the half way cut
"T" indicates a tie for a place.

=== Summary ===
Tournament	Wins	2nd	3rd	Top-5	Top-10	Top-25	Events	Cuts made
Masters Tournament	0	0	0	0	1	1	6	5
U.S. Open	0	0	0	1	1	1	9	6
The Open Championship	0	0	0	1	2	4	17	6
PGA Championship	0	0	0	1	1	3	11	8
Totals	0	0	0	3	5	9	43	25

- Most consecutive cuts made – 6 (2010 Masters – 2011 U.S. Open)
- Longest streak of top-10s – 3 (2008 Masters – 2008 Open Championship)

== Results in The Players Championship ==
Tournament	2007	2008	2009	2010	2011	2012
The Players Championship	T6		T71	69	T26	T56

Top 10
Did not play

"T" indicates a tie for a place

== Results in World Golf Championships ==
Tournament	1999	2000	2001	2002	2003	2004	2005	2006	2007	2008	2009	2010	2011	2012
Match Play					R64				R64	R64	R64	R32	R32	R32
Championship	T53		NT^{1}					21	T11	T30	T31	62	T31	T20
Invitational					T77			T62	T69	T20		T65	T17	
Champions												T34	T56	

^{1}Cancelled due to 9/11

Did not play

QF, R16, R32, R64 = Round in which player lost in match play
"T" = Tied
Note that the HSBC Champions did not become a WGC event until 2009.

== Results in senior major championships ==
Results not in chronological order

Tournament	2020	2021	2022	2023	2024	2025	2026
Senior PGA Championship	NT	T23	T17	T12	CUT	T14	CUT
The Tradition	NT	3	T57	T2	73	T38	T39
U.S. Senior Open	NT	T13	T41		CUT	T28	CUT
Senior Players Championship	T14	T32			T7	T33	T65
Senior British Open Championship	NT				T29	CUT	T41

Top 10
Did not play

CUT = missed the halfway cut
"T" indicates a tie for a place
NT = no tournament due to COVID-19 pandemic

== Team appearances ==
Amateur

- European Boys' Team Championship (representing Sweden): 1987
- European Amateur Team Championship (representing Sweden): 1989

Professional

- Dunhill Cup (representing Sweden): 1992
- Seve Trophy (representing Continental Europe): 2000 (winners), 2002, 2007, 2009
- World Cup (representing Sweden): 2001, 2007, 2008 (winners), 2009, 2011
- Ryder Cup (representing Europe): 2006 (winners), 2008
- Royal Trophy (representing Europe): 2007 (winners), 2010 (winners)

== See also ==
- 2012 PGA Tour Qualifying School graduates
- List of golfers with most European Tour wins
