= Graeme Storm =

English professional golfer (born 1978)

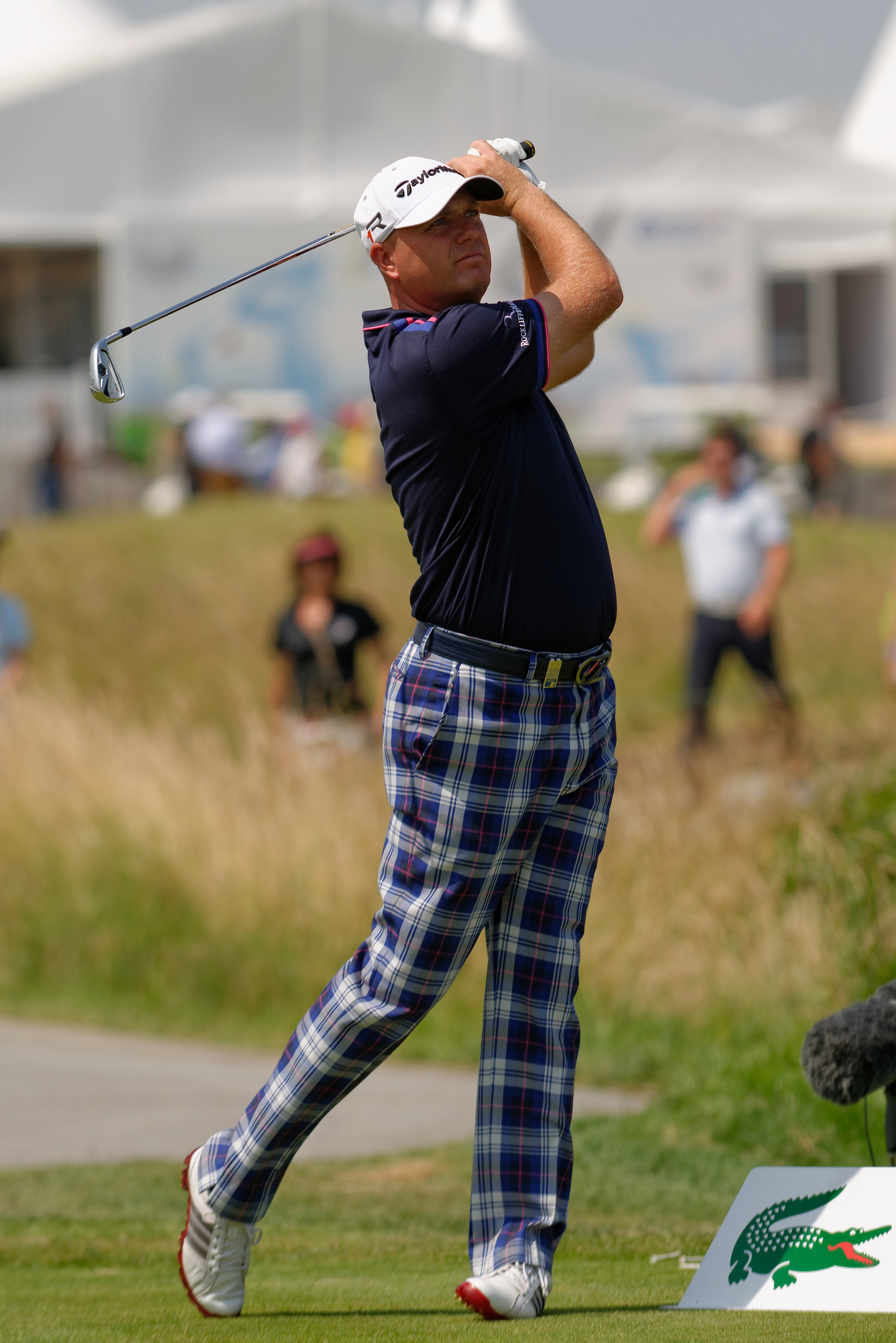
- Storm at the 2013 Alstom Open de France

Personal information
- Full name: Graeme Raymond Storm
- Nationality: England
- Born: 13 March 1978 (age 48) Hartlepool, England
- Height: 5 ft 10 in (1.78 m)
- Weight: 174 lb (79 kg; 12.4 st)
- Spouse: Sara
- Children: 1

Career
- Sport: Golf
- Turned professional: 2000
- Former tours: European Tour; Challenge Tour
- Professional wins: 4

Number of wins by tour
- European Tour: 2
- Sunshine Tour: 1
- Challenge Tour: 2

Best results in major championships
- Masters Tournament: CUT: 2000
- PGA Championship: T62: 2007
- U.S. Open: CUT: 2006, 2014
- The Open Championship: T39: 2008

Graeme Raymond Storm (born 13 March 1978) is an English professional golfer.

== Early life and amateur career ==
In 1978, Storm was born in Hartlepool, England. He learnt his trade at Hartlepool Golf Club, where he still holds the course record of 62. Storm won the 1999 Amateur Championship and represented Great Britain & Ireland in the Walker Cup later in the year.

== Professional career ==
In 2000, Storm turned professional. He initially had difficulty establishing himself on the European Tour, and took a job in a local cake factory in the off-season to help finance his early years as a professional. In 2004, he recorded two wins on the second tier Challenge Tour on his way to fourth in the end of season rankings, and automatic graduation back to the European Tour for 2005. That season he made a major advance by finishing 31st on the European Tour Order of Merit, an improvement of 90 places on his previous best.

In 2007, Storm won his first European Tour event, with a single shot victory at the Open de France ALSTOM. He commented, "It's unbelievable, to be honest. It's an amazing feeling.... Over the last six or seven months I've been thinking that it might never happen. I've been putting too much pressure on myself but hopefully now I can go on to better things." Later in the season, at the 2007 PGA Championship, Storm led after the first round after shooting a 5-under-par 65 at Southern Hills Country Club. However he could not maintain that form and finished in a tie for 62nd. He went on to finish the 2007 season ranked 16th on the Order of Merit.

In June 2009, Storm secured a place in the 2009 Open Championship after two rounds of final qualifying at Sunningdale, he shot a record eight-under 62 on the new course in the morning and ended 10-under.

In 2016, Storm finished 112th in the European Tour standings, one spot and 100 Euros short of regaining his Tour card. However, he regained his Tour card for the twelfth consecutive year after Patrick Reed lost his European Tour privileges for failing to make enough starts at regular (non-majors or WGC) events. Eighty-four days after almost losing his card, Storm won the South African Open, beating World Number 2, Rory McIlroy, in a playoff for his 2nd European Tour victory.

Storm also works with Today's Golfer magazine, writing tips and reviews.

== Amateur wins ==
- 1994 McGregor Trophy
- 1996 Carris Trophy, European Junior Championship
- 1999 The Amateur Championship

== Professional wins (4) ==
=== European Tour wins (2) ===
| No. | Date | Tournament | Winning score | Margin of victory | Runner-up |
|---|---|---|---|---|---|
| 1 | 1 Jul 2007 | Open de France Alstom | −7 (66-74-71-66=277) | 1 stroke | (Denmark) Søren Hansen |
| 2 | 15 Jan 2017 | BMW SA Open^{1} | −18 (69-63-67-71=270) | Playoff | (Northern Ireland) Rory McIlroy |

^{1}Co-sanctioned by the Sunshine Tour

European Tour playoff record (1–1)

| No. | Year | Tournament | Opponent | Result |
|---|---|---|---|---|
| 1 | 2014 | Omega European Masters | (United States) David Lipsky | Lost to par on first extra hole |
| 2 | 2017 | BMW SA Open | (Northern Ireland) Rory McIlroy | Won with par on third extra hole |

=== Challenge Tour wins (2) ===
| No. | Date | Tournament | Winning score | Margin of victory | Runner-up |
|---|---|---|---|---|---|
| 1 | 8 Aug 2004 | Ryder Cup Wales Challenge | −26 (68-63-64-67=262) | 3 strokes | (England) Matthew King |
| 2 | 10 Oct 2004 | Attijari Wafa - Tikida Beach Moroccan Classic | −16 (64-67-68-65=264) | 4 strokes | (Argentina) Juan Abbate |

== Results in major championships ==
| Tournament | 1999 | 2000 | 2001 | 2002 | 2003 | 2004 | 2005 | 2006 | 2007 | 2008 | 2009 | 2010 | 2011 | 2012 | 2013 | 2014 |
|---|---|---|---|---|---|---|---|---|---|---|---|---|---|---|---|---|
| Masters Tournament | | CUT | | | | | | | | | | | | | | |
| U.S. Open | | | | | | | | CUT | | | | | | | | CUT |
| The Open Championship | CUT | | | | | | T78 | | CUT | T39 | T52 | | CUT | | | |
| PGA Championship | | | | | | | | | T62 | | | | | | | |

Did not play

CUT = missed the half-way cut
"T" = tied

== Results in World Golf Championships ==
Results not in chronological order before 2015.

| Tournament | 2007 | 2008 | 2009 | 2010 | 2011 | 2012 | 2013 | 2014 | 2015 | 2016 | 2017 |
|---|---|---|---|---|---|---|---|---|---|---|---|
| Championship | | T6 | | | | | | | | | |
| Match Play | | | | | | | | | | | |
| Invitational | T69 | | | | | | | | | | |
| Champions | | | | | | | | | | | T71 |

Top 10
Did not play

"T" = Tied
Note that the HSBC Champions did not become a WGC event until 2009.

== Team appearances ==
Amateur

- European Boys' Team Championship (representing England): 1996
- Jacques Léglise Trophy (representing Great Britain & Ireland): 1996
- European Youths' Team Championship (representing England): 1998
- European Amateur Team Championship (representing England): 1999
- Walker Cup (representing Great Britain & Ireland): 1999 (winners)

Professional

- Seve Trophy (representing Great Britain & Ireland): 2007 (winners)
