= Principal Charity Classic =

Tournament information
- Location: Des Moines, Iowa
- Established: 2001
- Course: Wakonda Club
- Par: 72
- Length: 6,835 yards (6,250 m)
- Tour: PGA Tour Champions
- Format: 54-hole stroke play
- Prize fund: $2 million
- Month played: June

Tournament record score
- Aggregate: 195 Ernie Els (2024)
- To par: −21 Ernie Els (2024)

Current champion
- (United States) Zach Johnson

Location map
- Location within the United States Location within Iowa

The Principal Charity Classic is an annual, and award winning, PGA Tour Champions golf tournament in Des Moines, Iowa, and is dedicated to investing in the future of youth.

Founded in 2001 as the Allianz Championship, it has been sponsored by Principal Financial Group since 2007 and has been held at the William Langford-designed Wakonda Club since 2013. The Allianz Championship name was used by another tournament in Florida from 2007 through 2023.

Proceeds from the Principal Charity Classic support organizations focused on education and culture, financial security and stability, and health and wellness for youth initiatives. Through the 2026 tournament, the event has raised more than $83 million since 2007, including a record $10.8 million in 2006.

Golf Charitable Foundation of Greater Des Moines, operating as Principal Charity Classic, is a duly recognized 5019(c)(3) organization. While Principal Charity Classic receives funding from Principal Financial Group and Principal Foundation, Principal Charity Classic is a distinct, independent, charitable entity.

== Tournament venues ==
- 2001–2004: Glen Oaks Country Club, West Des Moines, Iowa
- 2005: Tournament Club of Iowa, Polk City, Iowa
- 2006–2012: Glen Oaks Country Club, West Des Moines, Iowa
- 2013–present: Wakonda Club, Des Moines, Iowa

== Course layout ==
Wakonda Club

Hole	Yards	Par	Hole	Yards	Par
1	438	4	10	442	4
2	165	3	11	440	4
3	387	4	12	362	4
4	420	4	13	536	5
5	548	5	14	192	3
6	423	4	15	506	5
7	367	4	16	453	4
8	549	5	17	182	3
9	154	3	18	311	4
Out	3,451	36	In	3,414	36
Source:			Total	6,865	72

== Winners ==
Year	Winner	Score	To par	Margin of victory	Runner(s)-up	Purse ($)
Principal Charity Classic
2026	(United States) Zach Johnson	199	−17	4 strokes	(South Africa) Retief Goosen (Australia) Richard Green	2,000,000
2025	(Spain) Miguel Ángel Jiménez	199	−17	Playoff	(Denmark) Søren Kjeldsen (Australia) Cameron Percy	2,000,000
2024	(South Africa) Ernie Els	195	−21	2 strokes	(Canada) Stephen Ames	2,000,000
2023	(Canada) Stephen Ames (2)	199	−17	1 stroke	(United States) Jerry Kelly (United States) Steve Stricker	2,000,000
2022	(United States) Jerry Kelly	198	−18	Playoff	(United States) Kirk Triplett	1,850,000
2021	(Canada) Stephen Ames	204	−12	1 stroke	(Canada) Mike Weir	1,850,000
2020	Cancelled due to the COVID-19 pandemic					
2019	(United States) Kevin Sutherland	199	−17	Playoff	(United States) Scott Parel	1,850,000
2018	(United States) Tom Lehman	131 (Note: Shortened to 36 holes due to weather.)	−13	2 strokes	(United States) Woody Austin (United States) Glen Day (Germany) Bernhard Langer (United States) Scott Parel	1,750,000
2017	(United States) Brandt Jobe	202	−14	1 stroke	(United States) Scott McCarron (United States) Kevin Sutherland	1,750,000
2016	(United States) Scott McCarron	201	−15	1 stroke	(United States) Billy Andrade (Spain) Miguel Ángel Jiménez	1,750,000
2015	(United States) Mark Calcavecchia	204	−12	1 stroke	(United States) Joe Durant (United States) Brian Henninger	1,750,000
2014	(United States) Tom Pernice Jr.	204	−12	Playoff	(United States) Doug Garwood	1,750,000
2013	(United States) Russ Cochran	205	−11	1 stroke	(United States) Jay Don Blake	1,750,000
2012	(United States) Jay Haas (3)	197	−16	2 strokes	(United States) Joe Durant (United States) Kirk Triplett	1,725,000
2011	(United States) Bob Gilder (2)	199	−14	1 stroke	(United States) Mark Brooks	1,725,000
2010	(Zimbabwe) Nick Price	199	−14	4 strokes	(United States) Tommy Armour III	1,725,000
2009	(Republic of Ireland) Mark McNulty	203	−10	Playoff	(United States) Fred Funk (Zimbabwe) Nick Price	1,725,000
2008	(United States) Jay Haas (2)	203	−10	1 stroke	(United States) Andy Bean	1,725,000
2007	(United States) Jay Haas	201	−12	3 strokes	(United States) Brad Bryant (United States) R. W. Eaks	1,600,000
Allianz Championship
2006	(United States) Gil Morgan	197	−16	1 stroke	(United States) Loren Roberts	1,500,000
2005	(United States) Tom Jenkins	204	−9	Playoff	(United States) D. A. Weibring	1,500,000
2004	(United States) D. A. Weibring	204	−9	3 strokes	(United States) Tom Jenkins	1,500,000
2003	(United States) Don Pooley	200	−13	3 strokes	(United States) Bruce Fleisher (United States) Bruce Lietzke (United States) Jim Thorpe	1,500,000
2002	(United States) Bob Gilder	203	−13	1 stroke	(South Africa) John Bland	1,850,000
2001	(United States) Jim Thorpe	199	−14	2 strokes	(United States) Gil Morgan	1,750,000

== Multiple winners ==
Three players have won this tournament more than once through 2026.

- 3 wins: Jay Haas (2007, 2008, 2012)
- 2 wins: Bob Gilder (2002, 2011)
- 2 wins: Stephen Ames (2021, 2023)
