= Hoag Classic =

Coordinates: 33.613°N 117.882°W

Tournament information
- Location: Newport Beach, California
- Established: 1995
- Course: Newport Beach Country Club
- Par: 71
- Length: 6,606 yards (6,041 m)
- Tour: PGA Tour Champions
- Format: Stroke play
- Prize fund: US$2,200,000
- Month played: March

Tournament record score
- Aggregate: 193 Duffy Waldorf (2015)
- To par: −20 as above

Current champion
- (United States) Stewart Cink

Final champion
- Location in the United States Location in California

The Hoag Classic (formerly the Toshiba Classic) is a golf tournament on the PGA Tour Champions. The Hoag Classic is played annually in March in Newport Beach, California at the Newport Beach Country Club. Newport Beach Country Club was designed by William Francis Bell in 1954. The tournament was founded in 1995 as the Toshiba Senior Classic. Hoag became the title sponsor of the tournament starting in 2019.

The longest sudden-death playoff in the history of the PGA Tour Champions occurred at the 1997 event when Bob Murphy defeated Jay Sigel on the ninth hole. The record was broken the following year at the Royal Caribbean Classic.

== Winners ==
Year	Winner	Score	To par	Margin of victory	Runner(s)-up	Purse ($)
Hoag Classic
2026	(United States) Stewart Cink	194	−19	4 strokes	(South Africa) Ernie Els (United States) Zach Johnson	2,200,000
2025	(Spain) Miguel Ángel Jiménez	198	−15	1 stroke	(United States) Stewart Cink (Sweden) Freddie Jacobson	2,000,000
Hoag Classic Newport Beach
2024	(Republic of Ireland) Pádraig Harrington	199	−14	1 stroke	(Thailand) Thongchai Jaidee	2,000,000
Hoag Classic
2023	(South Africa) Ernie Els (2)	200	−13	1 stroke	(United States) Doug Barron (United States) Steve Stricker	2,000,000
2022	(South Africa) Retief Goosen	198	−15	4 strokes	(South Korea) K. J. Choi	2,000,000
2021	No tournament due to the COVID-19 pandemic					
2020	(South Africa) Ernie Els	197	−16	2 strokes	(United States) Fred Couples (United States) Glen Day (Sweden) Robert Karlsson	1,800,000
2019	(United States) Kirk Triplett	203	−10	Playoff	(United States) Woody Austin	1,800,000
Toshiba Classic
2018	(Fiji) Vijay Singh	202	−11	1 stroke	(United States) Scott McCarron (United States) Tom Pernice Jr. (United States) Tommy Tolles	1,800,000
2017: No tournament
2016	(United States) Jay Haas (2)	197	−16	Playoff	(United States) Bart Bryant	1,800,000
2015	(United States) Duffy Waldorf	193	−20	2 strokes	(United States) Joe Durant	1,800,000
2014	(United States) Fred Couples (2)	198	−15	1 stroke	(Germany) Bernhard Langer (Scotland) Colin Montgomerie (United States) Steve Pate	1,750,000
2013	(South Africa) David Frost	194	−19	5 strokes	(United States) Fred Couples	1,750,000
2012	(United States) Loren Roberts (2)	205	−8	2 strokes	(United States) Mark Calcavecchia (United States) Tom Kite (Germany) Bernhard Langer	1,750,000
2011	(United States) Loren Roberts	196	−17	1 stroke	(United States) Mark Wiebe	1,700,000
2010	(United States) Fred Couples	195	−18	4 strokes	(United States) Ronnie Black	1,700,000
2009	(Argentina) Eduardo Romero	202	−11	1 stroke	(United States) Mark O'Meara (United States) Joey Sindelar	1,700,000
2008	(Germany) Bernhard Langer	199	−14	Playoff	(United States) Jay Haas	1,700,000
2007	(United States) Jay Haas	194	−19	2 strokes	(United States) R. W. Eaks	1,650,000
2006	(United States) Brad Bryant	204	−9	1 stroke	(United States) John Harris (United States) Mark Johnson (United States) Bobby Wadkins	1,650,000
Toshiba Senior Classic
2005	(United States) Mark Johnson (2)	200	−13	4 strokes	(United States) Keith Fergus (United States) Wayne Levi	1,650,000
2004	(United States) Mark Johnson	198	−15	1 stroke	(United States) Morris Hatalsky	1,600,000
2003	(Australia) Rodger Davis	197	−16	4 strokes	(United States) Larry Nelson	1,550,000
2002	(United States) Hale Irwin (2)	197	−16	5 strokes	(United States) Allen Doyle	1,500,000
2001	(Spain) José María Cañizares	202	−11	Playoff	(United States) Gil Morgan	1,400,000
2000	(United States) Allen Doyle	136 (Note: Shortened to 36 holes due to weather.)	−6	1 stroke	(United States) Jim Thorpe (United States) Howard Twitty	1,300,000
1999	(United States) Gary McCord	204	−9	Playoff	(United States) Allen Doyle (United States) Al Geiberger (United States) John Jacobs	1,200,000
1998	(United States) Hale Irwin	200	−13	1 stroke	(United States) Hubert Green	1,100,000
1997	(United States) Bob Murphy	207	−6	Playoff	(United States) Jay Sigel	1,000,000
1996	(United States) Jim Colbert	201	−12	2 strokes	(United States) Bob Eastwood	1,000,000
1995	(United States) George Archer	199	−11	1 stroke	(United States) Dave Stockton (United States) Tom Wargo	1,000,000
