= Brad Bryant =

American professional golfer (born 1954)

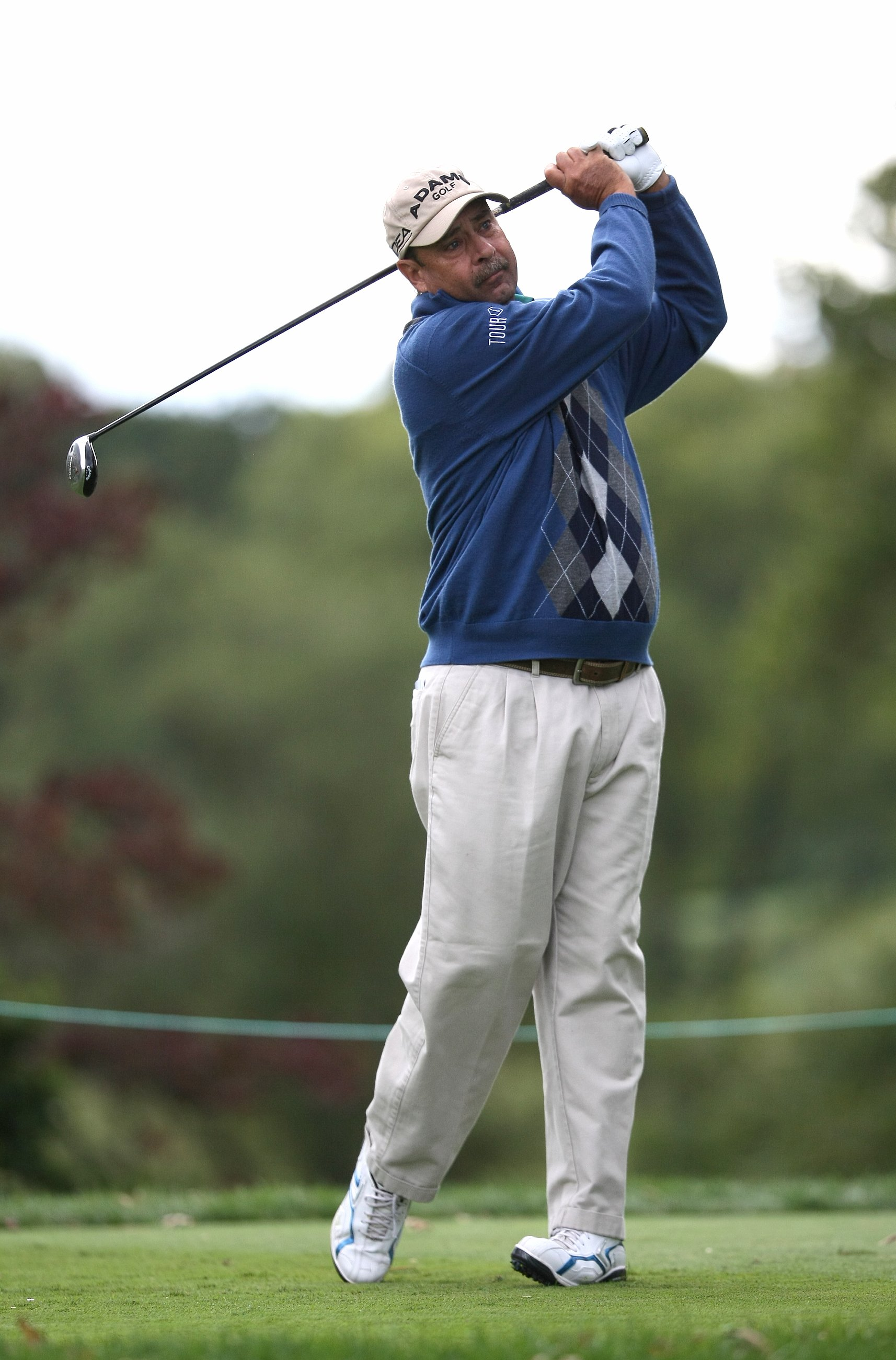

Personal information
- Full name: Bradley Dub Bryant
- Nickname: Dr. Dirt
- Nationality: United States
- Born: December 11, 1954 (age 71) Amarillo, Texas, U.S.
- Height: 5 ft 10 in (1.78 m)
- Weight: 190 lb (86 kg; 14 st)

Career
- Sport: Golf
- College: University of New Mexico
- Turned professional: 1976
- Current tour: PGA Tour Champions
- Former tour: PGA Tour
- Professional wins: 6
- Highest ranking: 50 (March 3, 1996)

Number of wins by tour
- PGA Tour: 1
- PGA Tour Champions: 4
- Other: 1

Best results in major championships
- Masters Tournament: CUT: 1995, 1996
- PGA Championship: T48: 1992
- U.S. Open: T13: 1995
- The Open Championship: CUT: 1995

Bradley Dub Bryant (born December 11, 1954) is an American professional golfer.

Bryant was born in Amarillo, Texas, the son of a Southern Baptist pastor. He moved with his family to Alamogordo, New Mexico during his youth. Bryant attended the University of New Mexico for three years, but turned professional and qualified for the PGA Tour in 1976, a year before his scheduled graduation.

Bryant's only win on the PGA Tour came at the age of forty at the 1995 Walt Disney World/Oldsmobile Classic, which took 20 years and 475 starts to achieve, one of the longest waits for a PGA Tour win. After reaching the age of 50, Bryant began play on the Champions Tour, where he won for the first time at the 2006 Toshiba Classic and followed up later the same year by winning the Regions Charity Classic. He lost to Jay Haas in a playoff for the 2006 Senior PGA Championship. His best year in professional golf was 2007, when he finished third on the Champions Tour money list and fourth in the Charles Schwab Cup race; that year was highlighted by his victory at the U.S. Senior Open.

Bryant's younger brother Bart also won on the PGA Tour.

== Professional wins (6) ==
=== PGA Tour wins (1) ===
No.	Date	Tournament	Winning score	Margin of victory	Runners-up
1	Oct 8, 1995	Walt Disney World/Oldsmobile Classic	−18 (67-63-68=198) (Note: Shortened to 54 holes due to weather.)	1 stroke	(United States) Hal Sutton, (United States) Ted Tryba

PGA Tour playoff record (0–1)

No.	Year	Tournament	Opponents	Result
1	1993	Buick Southern Open	(United States) Billy Andrade, (United States) Mark Brooks, (United States) Bob Estes, (United States) John Inman	Inman won with birdie on second extra hole Andrade, Brooks and Bryant eliminated by birdie on first hole

=== Other wins (1) ===
No.	Date	Tournament	Winning score	Margin of victory	Runners-up
1	Dec 4, 1994	JCPenney Classic (with (Spain) Marta Figueras-Dotti)	−22 (64-70-62-66=262)	Playoff	(Sweden) Helen Alfredsson and (United States) Robert Gamez

Other playoff record (1–0)

No.	Year	Tournament	Opponents	Result
1	1994	JCPenney Classic (with (Spain) Marta Figueras-Dotti)	(Sweden) Helen Alfredsson and (United States) Robert Gamez	Won with par on fourth extra hole

=== Champions Tour wins (4) ===
Legend
Senior major championships (1)
Other Champions Tour (3)

No.	Date	Tournament	Winning score	Margin of victory	Runner(s)-up
1	Mar 19, 2006	Toshiba Classic	−9 (68-70-66=204)	1 stroke	(United States) John Harris, (United States) Mark Johnson, (United States) Bobby Wadkins
2	May 7, 2006	Regions Charity Classic	−17 (68-67-64=199)	2 strokes	(Republic of Ireland) Mark McNulty
3	May 20, 2007	Regions Charity Classic (2)	−12 (70-69-65=204)	Playoff	(United States) R. W. Eaks
4	Jul 8, 2007	U.S. Senior Open	−6 (71-72-71-68=282)	3 strokes	(United States) Ben Crenshaw

Champions Tour playoff record (1–3)

No.	Year	Tournament	Opponent(s)	Result
1	2006	Senior PGA Championship	(United States) Jay Haas	Lost to par on third extra hole
2	2007	Regions Charity Classic	(United States) R. W. Eaks	Won with birdie on third extra hole
3	2008	ACE Group Classic	(United States) Scott Hoch, (United States) Tom Jenkins, (United States) Tom Kite	Hoch won with birdie on first extra hole
4	2008	AT&T Champions Classic	(United States) Loren Roberts, (Zimbabwe) Denis Watson	Watson won with birdie on third extra hole Bryant eliminated by birdie on second hole

== Results in major championships ==
Tournament	1980	1981	1982	1983	1984	1985	1986	1987	1988	1989
Masters Tournament										
U.S. Open				CUT						
The Open Championship										
PGA Championship	71	CUT	T61	CUT	CUT					T58

Tournament	1990	1991	1992	1993	1994	1995	1996	1997	1998	1999
Masters Tournament						CUT	CUT			
U.S. Open	CUT		T23		CUT	T13	T23			
The Open Championship						CUT				
PGA Championship	CUT		T48		CUT	CUT	CUT			

Tournament	2000	2001	2002	2003	2004	2005	2006	2007	2008
Masters Tournament									
U.S. Open									CUT
The Open Championship									
PGA Championship									

Did not play

CUT = missed the half-way cut
"T" = tied

== Results in The Players Championship ==
Tournament	1979	1980	1981	1982	1983	1984	1985	1986	1987	1988	1989	1990	1991	1992	1993	1994	1995	1996	1997
The Players Championship	CUT	T14	CUT	T2	CUT	CUT					T59	CUT	CUT	CUT	T52	T74	T6	CUT	CUT

Top 10
Did not play

CUT = missed the halfway cut
"T" indicates a tie for a place

== Senior major championships ==
=== Wins (1) ===
Year	Championship	Winning score	Margin	Runner-up
2007	U.S. Senior Open	−6 (71-72-71-68=282)	3 strokes	(United States) Ben Crenshaw

=== Results timeline ===
Results not in chronological order.

Tournament	2005	2006	2007	2008	2009	2010	2011	2012	2013	2014	2015	2016	2017	2018	2019	2020	2021	2022	2023	2024	2025
The Tradition	T16	T14	T21	T25	3	T34	T18	T7	WD		T17	T44	76			NT					
Senior PGA Championship	57	2	6		T70	T23	T22		T42							NT					
Senior Players Championship	T16	T7	T46	T7	T53	71	T15	T20		T28	T39	T49	T63								
U.S. Senior Open	CUT	T14	1	T14	T11	CUT	T17	T28		T26	T54	T37	59	CUT	54	NT	CUT		CUT		CUT
Senior British Open Championship			T30													NT					

Win
Top 10
Did not play

CUT = missed the halfway cut
WD = withdrew
"T" indicates a tie for a place
NT = no tournament due to COVID-19 pandemic

== See also ==
- Spring 1978 PGA Tour Qualifying School graduates
- 1987 PGA Tour Qualifying School graduates
- 1988 PGA Tour Qualifying School graduates
