= 2009 Champions Tour =

Golf tour season

2009 Champions Tour season
- Duration: January 23, 2009 – November 1, 2009
- Number of official events: 25
- Most wins: (Germany) Bernhard Langer (4)
- Charles Schwab Cup: (United States) Loren Roberts
- Money list: (Germany) Bernhard Langer
- Player of the Year: (Germany) Bernhard Langer
- Rookie of the Year: (United States) Russ Cochran

The 2009 Champions Tour was the 30th season of the Champions Tour (formerly the Senior PGA Tour), the main professional golf tour in the United States for men aged 50 and over.

== Schedule ==
The following table lists official events during the 2009 season.

Date	Tournament	Location	Purse (US$)	Winner (Note: The number in parentheses after each winner's name is the number of Champions Tour events they had won up to and including that tournament. This information is only shown for Champions Tour members.)	Notes
Jan 25	Mitsubishi Electric Championship at Hualalai	Hawaii	1,800,000	(Germany) Bernhard Langer (5)	
Feb 15	Allianz Championship	Florida	1,700,000	(United States) Mike Goodes (1)	
Feb 22	ACE Group Classic	Florida	1,600,000	(United States) Loren Roberts (9)	
Mar 8	Toshiba Classic	California	1,700,000	(Argentina) Eduardo Romero (5)	
Mar 15	AT&T Champions Classic	California	1,600,000	(United States) Dan Forsman (1)	
Mar 29	Cap Cana Championship	Dominican Republic	2,100,000	(United States) Keith Fergus (2)	
Apr 19	Outback Steakhouse Pro-Am	Florida	1,700,000	(Zimbabwe) Nick Price (1)	Pro-Am
Apr 26	Liberty Mutual Legends of Golf	Georgia	2,600,000	(Germany) Bernhard Langer (6) and (United States) Tom Lehman (1)	Team event
May 17	Regions Charity Classic	Alabama	1,700,000	(United States) Keith Fergus (3)	
May 24	Senior PGA Championship	Ohio	2,000,000	(United States) Michael Allen (1)	Senior major championship
May 31	Principal Charity Classic	Iowa	1,725,000	(Republic of Ireland) Mark McNulty (7)	
Jun 7	Triton Financial Classic	Texas	1,600,000	(Germany) Bernhard Langer (7)	
Jun 28	Dick's Sporting Goods Open	New York	1,650,000	(United States) Lonnie Nielsen (2)	
Jul 12	3M Championship	Minnesota	1,750,000	(Germany) Bernhard Langer (8)	
Jul 26	The Senior Open Championship	England	2,000,000	(United States) Loren Roberts (10)	Senior major championship
Aug 2	U.S. Senior Open	Indiana	2,600,000	(United States) Fred Funk (5)	Senior major championship
Aug 23	JELD-WEN Tradition	Oregon	2,700,000	(United States) Mike Reid (2)	Champions Tour major championship
Aug 30	Boeing Classic	Washington	1,800,000	(United States) Loren Roberts (11)	
Sep 6	Walmart First Tee Open at Pebble Beach	California	2,100,000	(United States) Jeff Sluman (3)	
Sep 20	Greater Hickory Classic at Rock Barn	North Carolina	1,750,000	(United States) Jay Haas (13)	
Sep 27	SAS Championship	North Carolina	2,100,000	(United States) Tom Pernice Jr. (1)	
Oct 4	Constellation Energy Senior Players Championship	Maryland	2,700,000	(United States) Jay Haas (14)	Champions Tour major championship
Oct 18	Administaff Small Business Classic	Texas	1,700,000	(United States) John Cook (3)	
Oct 25	AT&T Championship	Texas	1,700,000	(United States) Phil Blackmar (1)	
Nov 1	Charles Schwab Cup Championship	California	2,500,000	(United States) John Cook (4)	Tour Championship

== Charles Schwab Cup ==
The Charles Schwab Cup was based on tournament results during the season, calculated using a points-based system.

Position	Player	Points
1	(United States) Loren Roberts	2,670
2	(United States) John Cook	2,351
3	(United States) Fred Funk	2,349
4	(Germany) Bernhard Langer	2,322
5	(United States) Jay Haas	1,984

== Money list ==
The money list was based on prize money won during the season, calculated in U.S. dollars.

Position	Player	Prize money ($)
1	(Germany) Bernhard Langer	2,139,451
2	(United States) Loren Roberts	1,960,613
3	(United States) John Cook	1,798,664
4	(United States) Jay Haas	1,758,395
5	(United States) Fred Funk	1,563,810

== Awards ==
Award	Winner	Ref.
Player of the Year (Jack Nicklaus Trophy)	(Germany) Bernhard Langer	
Rookie of the Year	(United States) Russ Cochran	
Scoring leader (Byron Nelson Award)	(Germany) Bernhard Langer	
