= Glen Oaks Country Club =

Golf course

Coordinates: 41.549°N 93.781°W

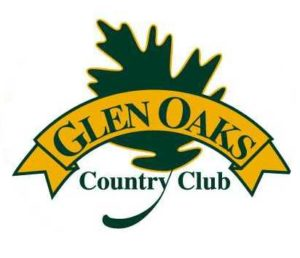
- Former logo, pre-2022
- Interactive map of Glen Oaks Country Club

Club information
- Established: 1994
- Type: Private
- Owner: Concert Golf Partners
- Operator: Jeff Schauer
- Tota holes: 18
- Tournaments: Principal Charity Classic (2001–2004, 2006–2012)
- Greens: Bentgrass
- Fairways: Bentgrass
- Website: Glen Oaks Country Club
- Designed by: Tom Fazio
- Par: 70
- Length: 6,901 yards (6,310 m)
- Course rating: 72.1
- Slope rating: 136

Glen Oaks Country Club is a golf course and country club in West Des Moines, Iowa. It is a former venue for the Principal Charity Classic, a golf tournament on the PGA Tour Champions circuit.

== History ==
Glen Oaks was developed on over 500 acres of farmland in West Des Moines, Iowa beginning in 1991. The course was designed by Tom Fazio, with construction on the course itself beginning in 1993. When the neighborhood opened in 1994, it was the first gated residential community in central Iowa.

Glen Oaks went through foreclosure in 2009, during the Great Recession, and ownership was taken over by West Bank. A group of Glen Oaks homeowners purchased the club from the bank in 2010 for a reported $4.7 million. Following the purchase, the new owners began an extensive renovation of the course and clubhouse. There was another major renovation completed in 2017.

In 2022, Concert Golf Partners purchased the club for a reported $12.5 million.

== Tournaments ==
Glen Oaks was the host of the Principal Charity Classic, then known as the Allianz Championship, from 2001 until 2004. The 2005 edition was held at the Tournament Club of Iowa in Polk City, before returning to Glen Oaks from 2006 until 2012. The Classic has been held at the Wakonda Club in Des Moines from the 2013 edition onwards.
