= 2007 Champions Tour =

Golf tour season

2007 Champions Tour season
- Duration: January 19, 2007 – October 28, 2008
- Number of official events: 29
- Most wins: (United States) Jay Haas (4)
- Charles Schwab Cup: (United States) Loren Roberts
- Money list: (United States) Jay Haas
- Player of the Year: (United States) Jay Haas
- Rookie of the Year: (Zimbabwe) Denis Watson

The 2007 Champions Tour was the 28th season of the Champions Tour (formerly the Senior PGA Tour), the main professional golf tour in the United States for men aged 50 and over.

== Schedule ==
The following table lists official events during the 2007 season.

Date	Tournament	Location	Purse (US$)	Winner (Note: The number in parentheses after each winner's name is the number of Champions Tour events they had won up to and including that tournament. This information is only shown for Champions Tour members.)	Notes
Jan 21	MasterCard Championship	Hawaii	1,700,000	(United States) Hale Irwin (45)	
Jan 28	Turtle Bay Championship	Hawaii	1,600,000	(United States) Fred Funk (2)	
Feb 11	Allianz Championship	Florida	1,600,000	(England) Mark James (3)	New tournament
Feb 18	Outback Steakhouse Pro-Am	Florida	1,600,000	(United States) Tom Watson (9)	Pro-Am
Feb 25	ACE Group Classic	Florida	1,600,000	(United States) Bobby Wadkins (4)	
Mar 11	Toshiba Classic	California	1,650,000	(United States) Jay Haas (7)	
Mar 18	AT&T Champions Classic	California	1,600,000	(United States) Tom Purtzer (4)	
Apr 1	Ginn Championship Hammock Beach Resort	Florida	2,500,000	(United States) Keith Fergus (1)	
Apr 22	Liberty Mutual Legends of Golf	Georgia	2,500,000	(United States) Jay Haas (8)	
May 6	FedEx Kinko's Classic	Texas	1,600,000	(United States) Scott Hoch (1)	
May 20	Regions Charity Classic	Alabama	1,600,000	(United States) Brad Bryant (3)	
May 27	Senior PGA Championship	South Carolina	2,000,000	(Zimbabwe) Denis Watson (1)	Senior major championship
Jun 3	Boeing Championship at Sandestin	Florida	1,650,000	(United States) Loren Roberts (6)	
Jun 10	Principal Charity Classic	Iowa	1,600,000	(United States) Jay Haas (9)	
Jun 24	Bank of America Championship	Massachusetts	1,650,000	(United States) Jay Haas (10)	
Jul 1	Commerce Bank Championship	New York	1,500,000	(United States) Lonnie Nielsen (1)	
Jul 8	U.S. Senior Open	Wisconsin	2,600,000	(United States) Brad Bryant (4)	Senior major championship
Jul 15	Dick's Sporting Goods Open	New York	1,600,000	(United States) R. W. Eaks (1)	New tournament
Jul 29	The Senior Open Championship	Scotland	2,000,000	(United States) Tom Watson (10)	Senior major championship
Aug 5	3M Championship	Minnesota	1,750,000	(United States) D. A. Weibring (4)	
Aug 19	JELD-WEN Tradition	Oregon	2,600,000	(Republic of Ireland) Mark McNulty (6)	Champions Tour major championship
Aug 26	Boeing Classic	Washington	1,600,000	(Zimbabwe) Denis Watson (2)	
Sep 2	Wal-Mart First Tee Open at Pebble Beach	California	2,000,000	(United States) Gil Morgan (25)	
Sep 16	Greater Hickory Classic at Rock Barn	North Carolina	1,600,000	(United States) R. W. Eaks (2)	
Sep 23	SAS Championship	North Carolina	2,000,000	(United States) Mark Wiebe (1)	
Oct 7	Constellation Energy Senior Players Championship	Maryland	2,600,000	(United States) Loren Roberts (7)	Champions Tour major championship
Oct 14	Administaff Small Business Classic	Texas	1,700,000	(Germany) Bernhard Langer (1)	
Oct 21	AT&T Championship	Texas	1,600,000	(United States) John Cook (1)	
Oct 28	Charles Schwab Cup Championship	California	2,500,000	(United States) Jim Thorpe (13)	Tour Championship

=== Unofficial events ===
The following events were sanctioned by the Champions Tour, but did not carry official money, nor were wins official.

Date	Tournament	Location	Purse ($)	Winners	Notes
Dec 2	Del Webb Father/Son Challenge	Florida	1,000,000	(United States) Larry Nelson and son Josh Nelson	Team event

== Charles Schwab Cup ==
The Charles Schwab Cup was based on tournament results during the season, calculated using a points-based system.

Position	Player	Points
1	(United States) Loren Roberts	2,716
2	(United States) Jay Haas	2,551
3	(Zimbabwe) Denis Watson	2,177
4	(United States) Brad Bryant	2,167
5	(United States) Tom Watson	2,032

== Money list ==
The money list was based on prize money won during the season, calculated in U.S. dollars.

Position	Player	Prize money ($)
1	(United States) Jay Haas	2,581,001
2	(United States) Loren Roberts	2,170,627
3	(United States) Brad Bryant	1,812,099
4	(Zimbabwe) Denis Watson	1,636,123
5	(United States) D. A. Weibring	1,557,622

== Awards ==
Award	Winner	Ref.
Player of the Year (Jack Nicklaus Trophy)	(United States) Jay Haas	
Rookie of the Year	(Zimbabwe) Denis Watson	
Scoring leader (Byron Nelson Award)	(United States) Loren Roberts	
Comeback Player of the Year	(United States) R. W. Eaks	
