= D. A. Weibring =

American professional golfer (born 1953)

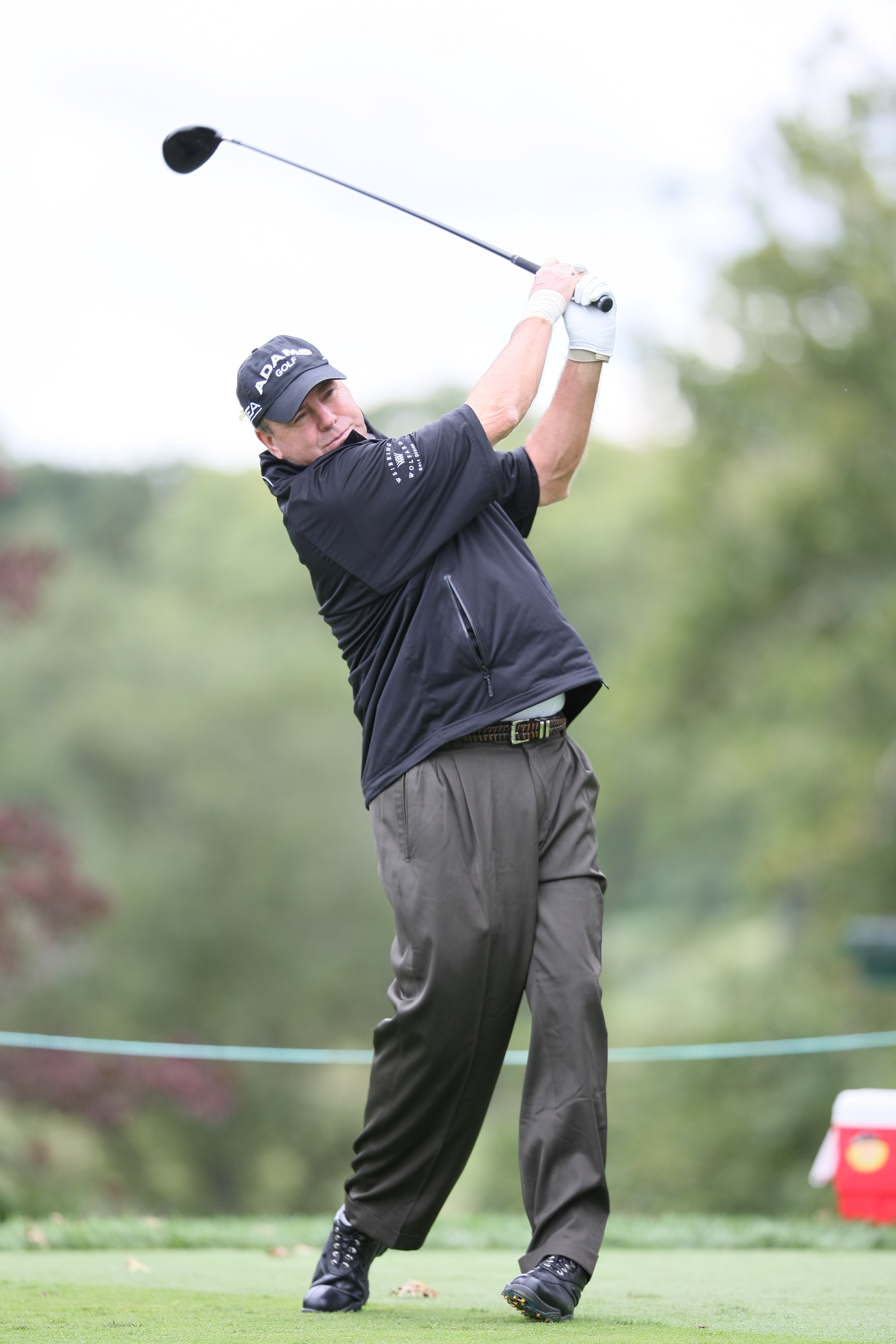
- Weibring in 2009

Personal information
- Full name: Donald Albert Weibring Jr.
- Nationality: United States
- Born: May 25, 1953 (age 73) Quincy, Illinois, U.S.
- Height: 6 ft 1 in (1.85 m)
- Weight: 200 lb (91 kg; 14 st)

Career
- Sport: Golf
- College: Illinois State University
- Turned professional: 1975
- Former tours: PGA Tour; Champions Tour
- Professional wins: 13
- Highest ranking: 36 (July 3, 1988)

Number of wins by tour
- PGA Tour: 5
- Japan Golf Tour: 1
- PGA Tour of Australasia: 1
- PGA Tour Champions: 5
- Other: 1

Best results in major championships
- Masters Tournament: T7: 1987
- PGA Championship: T3: 1987
- U.S. Open: T3: 1988
- The Open Championship: T8: 1985

Achievements and awards
- PGA Tour Comeback Player of the Year: 1991

Donald Albert Weibring Jr. (born May 25, 1953) is an American retired professional golfer who has won numerous tournaments, including several on the PGA Tour and Champions Tour.

== Early life and amateur career ==
Weibring was born in Quincy, Illinois. His father started him playing golf at a young age. In 1975, Weibring graduated from Illinois State University with a Bachelor of Business Administration.

== Professional career ==
Weibring turned professional in 1975. He has won five PGA Tour events. His first was in 1979 at Quad Cities — an event he would win three times. His last Tour victory was at the Canon Greater Hartford Open in 1996. Weibring had five top-10 finishes in major championships — twice at the PGA Championship, and one in each of the others.

Weibring joined the Champions Tour after turning 50 in May 2003, and won five tournaments. In 2004, he led the Champions Tour with 15 top-10 finishes in 25 appearances including a wire-to-wire win at the Allianz Championship. He last played in a Champions Tour event in 2016.

He has his own golf course design and management company with golf course architect Steven Wolfard.

== Personal life ==
Weibring has three children: two daughters and one son. His son, Matt Weibring, is a professional golfer and has played on the PGA Tour.

== Awards and honors ==
Weibring was inducted into the Illinois PGA Hall of Fame in 2001.

== Professional wins (13) ==
=== PGA Tour wins (5) ===
No.	Date	Tournament	Winning score	Margin of victory	Runner(s)-up
1	Jul 22, 1979	Ed McMahon-Jaycees Quad Cities Open	−14 (67-65-69-65=266)	2 strokes	(United States) Calvin Peete
2	Aug 23, 1987	Beatrice Western Open	−9 (70-69-68=207)*	1 stroke	(United States) Larry Nelson, (Australia) Greg Norman
3	Sep 15, 1991	Hardee's Golf Classic (2)	−13 (68-67-68-64=267)	1 stroke	(United States) Paul Azinger, (United States) Peter Jacobsen
4	Sep 24, 1995	Quad City Classic (3)	−13 (64-65-68=197)*	1 stroke	(United States) Jonathan Kaye
5	Jun 30, 1996	Canon Greater Hartford Open	−10 (68-65-70-67=270)	4 strokes	(United States) Tom Kite

*Note: Tournament shortened to 54 holes due to weather.

PGA Tour playoff record (0–2)

No.	Year	Tournament	Opponent	Result
1	1980	Andy Williams-San Diego Open Invitational	(United States) Tom Watson	Lost to par on first extra hole
2	1991	Las Vegas Invitational	(United States) Andrew Magee	Lost to par on second extra hole

=== PGA of Japan Tour wins (1) ===
No.	Date	Tournament	Winning score	Margin of victory	Runner-up
1	Oct 20, 1985	Polaroid Cup Golf Digest Tournament	−16 (66-72-65-65=268)	2 strokes	(Japan) Yasuhiro Funatogawa

=== PGA Tour of Australia wins (1) ===
No.	Date	Tournament	Winning score	Margin of victory	Runner-up
1	Dec 1, 1985 (1986 season)	Air New Zealand Shell Open	−16 (64-67-66-67=264)	1 stroke	(Australia) Rodger Davis

=== Other wins (1) ===
No.	Date	Tournament	Winning score	Margin of victory	Runners-up
1	May 23, 1989	Family House Invitational	−10 (67-67=134)	4 strokes	(United States) Mike Hulbert, (United States) Lee Trevino

Other playoff record (0–1)

No.	Year	Tournament	Opponent	Result
1	1992	Hassan II Golf Trophy	(United States) Payne Stewart	Lost to birdie on second extra hole

=== Champions Tour wins (5) ===
Legend
Champions Tour major championships (1)
Other Champions Tour (4)

No.	Date	Tournament	Winning score	Margin of victory	Runner(s)-up
1	Sep 21, 2003	SAS Championship	−13 (65-72-66=203)	1 stroke	(United States) Tom Kite, (United States) Bobby Wadkins
2	May 23, 2004	Allianz Championship	−9 (65-68-71=204)	3 strokes	(United States) Tom Jenkins
3	May 22, 2005	Bruno's Memorial Classic	−15 (67-65-69=201)	2 strokes	(United States) Tom Jenkins, (United States) Tom Kite
4	Aug 5, 2007	3M Championship	−18 (65-66-67=198)	1 stroke	(United States) Jay Haas
5	Oct 12, 2008	Constellation Energy Senior Players Championship	−9 (67-70-66-68=271)	1 stroke	(United States) Fred Funk

Champions Tour playoff record (0–1)

No.	Year	Tournament	Opponent	Result
1	2005	Allianz Championship	(United States) Tom Jenkins	Lost to birdie on second extra hole

== Results in major championships ==
Tournament	1979	1980	1981	1982	1983	1984	1985	1986	1987	1988	1989
Masters Tournament		CUT							T7	CUT	T46
U.S. Open	T19	CUT	T43		T20	T38	CUT		CUT	T3	T21
The Open Championship							T8	T30			
PGA Championship	CUT	T46	T39	CUT	CUT	69	T65	4	T3	T52	

Tournament	1990	1991	1992	1993	1994	1995	1996	1997	1998	1999
Masters Tournament			T25				CUT	CUT		
U.S. Open		T11	CUT	CUT					T25	T23
The Open Championship					CUT		T60			
PGA Championship			CUT	T44	T47	T31	T17			

Top 10
Did not play

CUT = missed the half-way cut
"T" = tied

=== Summary ===
Tournament	Wins	2nd	3rd	Top-5	Top-10	Top-25	Events	Cuts made
Masters Tournament	0	0	0	0	1	2	7	3
U.S. Open	0	0	1	1	1	7	14	9
The Open Championship	0	0	0	0	1	1	4	3
PGA Championship	0	0	1	2	2	3	15	11
Totals	0	0	2	3	5	13	40	26

- Most consecutive cuts made – 6 (1988 U.S. Open – 1992 Masters)
- Longest streak of top-10s – 2 (1986 PGA – 1987 Masters)

== Results in The Players Championship ==
Tournament	1979	1980	1981	1982	1983	1984	1985	1986	1987	1988	1989
The Players Championship	CUT	T64	T51	T27	CUT	CUT	2	T33	CUT	CUT	T21

Tournament	1990	1991	1992	1993	1994	1995	1996	1997	1998	1999
The Players Championship	T36	T41	CUT	T61	T69	T43		CUT		

Tournament	2000	2001	2002	2003	2004	2005	2006	2007	2008	2009
The Players Championship										WD

Top 10
Did not play

CUT = missed the halfway cut
WD = withdrew
"T" indicates a tie for a place

== Champions Tour major championships ==
=== Wins (1) ===
Year	Championship	Winning score	Margin	Runner-up
2008	Constellation Energy Senior Players Championship	−9 (67-70-66-68=271)	1 stroke	(United States) Fred Funk

=== Results timeline ===
Results not in chronological order before 2012.

Tournament	2003	2004	2005	2006	2007	2008	2009	2010	2011	2012	2013
Senior PGA Championship	T48	T17	T31	10	T12	T53		CUT	T18	CUT	78
The Tradition	T10	T4	T9	T29	3	T7		T21	T41	T47	
Senior Players Championship		T13	T5	T22	T5	1	WD	T20	T51	WD	
U.S. Senior Open		6	T2	T8	T5	T34		WD	T37		CUT
Senior British Open Championship	5	T61		T6	T19						

Win
Top 10
Did not play

CUT = missed the halfway cut
WD = withdrew from tournament
"T" indicates a tie for a place

== U.S. national team appearances ==
- Dunhill Cup: 1987

== See also ==
- Spring 1977 PGA Tour Qualifying School graduates
