= George Cadle =

American golfer (1948–2015)

Personal information
- Full name: George Ancil Cadle
- Nationality: United States
- Born: May 9, 1948 Middlesboro, Kentucky, U.S.
- Died: March 15, 2015 (aged 66) Middlesboro, Kentucky, U.S.
- Height: 6 ft 0 in (1.83 m)
- Weight: 210 lb (95 kg; 15 st)

Career
- Sport: Golf
- Turned professional: 1975
- Former tour: PGA Tour

George Ancil Cadle (May 9, 1948 – March 15, 2015) was an American professional golfer who played on the PGA Tour in the 1970s and 1980s.

Born in Middlesboro, Kentucky, Cadle was a graduate of Middlesboro High School and the University of Tennessee. As an amateur golfer, Cadle won the Kentucky State Amateur tournament three times, in 1966, 1967 and 1969, playing on three different Bluegrass State courses.

He made his PGA Tour debut in 1974 at the Bob Hope Desert Classic and joined the tour full-time a year later. His best finish in the 1970s was a tie for third at the 1979 Greater Hartford Open. He would record the second and final third-place finish of his career a year later at the 1980 Greater Milwaukee Open. In 1980 he would also finish 57th on the money list, making $75,265, his best placing ever.

The best finish of his career was again at the 1983 Greater Milwaukee Open. Cadle shot a final-round, 8-under-par 64 - including four birdies in his final six holes - to force a sudden-death playoff, which he lost to Morris Hatalsky on the second hole.

In 1990, he played in 11 tournaments during the inaugural season of the developmental Ben Hogan Tour. His best result was an 11th-place showing at the New Haven Open. The following year he made his final PGA Tour appearance.

His golfing nickname was "Cuddles."

== Honors ==
The Kentucky Golf Hall of Fame inducted Cadle in 2010, joining Bobby Nichols, Kenny Perry, Gay Brewer, Frank Beard, Jodie Mudd and Larry Gilbert.

== Playoff record ==
PGA Tour playoff record (0–1)

No.	Year	Tournament	Opponent	Result
1	1983	Greater Milwaukee Open	(United States) Morris Hatalsky	Lost to par on second extra hole

== See also ==
- 1974 PGA Tour Qualifying School graduates
