= 2008 Champions Tour =

Golf tour season

2008 Champions Tour season
- Duration: January 18, 2008 – November 2, 2008
- Number of official events: 29
- Most wins: (Germany) Bernhard Langer (3) (Argentina) Eduardo Romero (3)
- Charles Schwab Cup: (United States) Jay Haas
- Money list: (Germany) Bernhard Langer
- Player of the Year: (Germany) Bernhard Langer
- Rookie of the Year: (Germany) Bernhard Langer

The 2008 Champions Tour was the 29th season of the Champions Tour (formerly the Senior PGA Tour), the main professional golf tour in the United States for men aged 50 and over.

== Schedule ==
The following table lists official events during the 2008 season.

Date	Tournament	Location	Purse (US$)	Winner (Note: The number in parentheses after each winner's name is the number of Champions Tour events they had won up to and including that tournament. This information is only shown for Champions Tour members.)	Notes
Jan 20	MasterCard Championship	Hawaii	1,800,000	(United States) Fred Funk (3)	
Jan 27	Turtle Bay Championship	Hawaii	1,600,000	(United States) Jerry Pate (2)	
Feb 10	Allianz Championship	Florida	1,650,000	(United States) Scott Hoch (2)	
Feb 17	ACE Group Classic	Florida	1,600,000	(United States) Scott Hoch (3)	
Mar 9	Toshiba Classic	California	1,700,000	(Germany) Bernhard Langer (2)	
Mar 16	AT&T Champions Classic	California	1,600,000	(Zimbabwe) Denis Watson (3)	
Mar 30	Ginn Championship Hammock Beach Resort	Florida	2,500,000	(Germany) Bernhard Langer (3)	
Apr 6	Cap Cana Championship	Dominican Republic	2,000,000	(United States) Mark Wiebe (2)	New tournament
Apr 20	Outback Steakhouse Pro-Am	Florida	1,700,000	(United States) Tom Watson (11)	Pro-Am
Apr 27	Liberty Mutual Legends of Golf	Georgia	2,600,000	(United States) Andy North (1) and (United States) Tom Watson (12)	Team event
May 4	FedEx Kinko's Classic	Texas	1,600,000	(Zimbabwe) Denis Watson (4)	
May 18	Regions Charity Classic	Alabama	1,700,000	(United States) Andy Bean (2)	
May 25	Senior PGA Championship	New York	2,000,000	(United States) Jay Haas (11)	Senior major championship
Jun 1	Principal Charity Classic	Iowa	1,725,000	(United States) Jay Haas (12)	
Jun 22	Bank of America Championship	Massachusetts	1,650,000	(United States) Jeff Sluman (1)	
Jun 29	Commerce Bank Championship	New York	1,600,000	(United States) Loren Roberts (8)	
Jul 6	Dick's Sporting Goods Open	New York	1,600,000	(Argentina) Eduardo Romero (2)	
Jul 20	3M Championship	Minnesota	1,750,000	(United States) R.W. Eaks (3)	
Jul 27	The Senior Open Championship	Scotland	2,000,000	(United States) Bruce Vaughan (1)	Senior major championship
Aug 3	U.S. Senior Open	Colorado	2,600,000	(Argentina) Eduardo Romero (3)	Senior major championship
Aug 17	JELD-WEN Tradition	Oregon	2,600,000	(United States) Fred Funk (4)	Champions Tour major championship
Aug 24	Boeing Classic	Washington	1,700,000	(United States) Tom Kite (10)	
Aug 31	Walmart First Tee Open at Pebble Beach	California	2,100,000	(United States) Jeff Sluman (2)	
Sep 14	Greater Hickory Classic at Rock Barn	North Carolina	1,700,000	(United States) R.W. Eaks (4)	
Sep 28	SAS Championship	North Carolina	2,100,000	(Argentina) Eduardo Romero (4)	
Oct 12	Constellation Energy Senior Players Championship	Maryland	2,600,000	(United States) D. A. Weibring (5)	Champions Tour major championship
Oct 19	Administaff Small Business Classic	Texas	1,700,000	(Germany) Bernhard Langer (4)	
Oct 26	AT&T Championship	Texas	1,650,000	(United States) John Cook (2)	
Nov 2	Charles Schwab Cup Championship	California	2,500,000	(United States) Andy Bean (3)	Tour Championship

=== Unofficial events ===
The following events were sanctioned by the Champions Tour, but did not carry official money, nor were wins official.

Date	Tournament	Location	Purse ($)	Winners	Notes
Dec 2	Del Webb Father/Son Challenge	Florida	1,000,000	(United States) Larry Nelson and son Drew Nelson	Team event

== Charles Schwab Cup ==
The Charles Schwab Cup was based on tournament results during the season, calculated using a points-based system.

Position	Player	Points
1	(United States) Jay Haas	2,556
2	(United States) Fred Funk	2,544
3	(Germany) Bernhard Langer	2,460
4	(Argentina) Eduardo Romero	2,032
5	(United States) John Cook	1,867

== Money list ==
The money list was based on prize money won during the season, calculated in U.S. dollars.

Position	Player	Prize money ($)
1	(Germany) Bernhard Langer	2,035,073
2	(United States) Jay Haas	1,991,726
3	(United States) Fred Funk	1,825,931
4	(United States) Jeff Sluman	1,728,443
5	(United States) John Cook	1,721,038

== Awards ==
Award	Winner	Ref.
Player of the Year (Jack Nicklaus Trophy)	(Germany) Bernhard Langer	
Rookie of the Year	(Germany) Bernhard Langer	
Scoring leader (Byron Nelson Award)	(Germany) Bernhard Langer	
