= Fred Funk =

American professional golfer (born 1956)

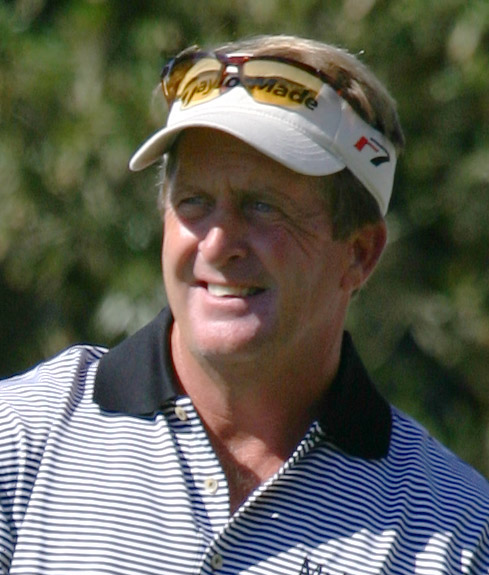
- Funk in 2006

Personal information
- Full name: Frederick Funk
- Nationality: United States
- Born: June 14, 1956 (age 70) Takoma Park, Maryland, U.S.
- Height: 5 ft 8 in (1.73 m)
- Spouse: Sharon
- Children: 3

Career
- Sport: Golf
- College: University of Maryland
- Turned professional: 1981
- Current tour: PGA Tour Champions (joined 2006)
- Former tour: PGA Tour (joined 1989)
- Professional wins: 29
- Highest ranking: 21 (June 22, 2003)

Number of wins by tour
- PGA Tour: 8
- PGA Tour Champions: 9
- Other: 12

Best results in major championships
- Masters Tournament: T17: 1997
- PGA Championship: T4: 2002
- U.S. Open: 6th: 2004
- The Open Championship: T66: 2006

Frederick Funk (born June 14, 1956) is an American professional golfer. He currently plays on the PGA Tour Champions. He previously played on the PGA Tour, where he was an eight-time winner. Funk's signature win came at The Players Championship in 2005.

== Early life ==
Funk was born in Takoma Park, Maryland. He tried several sports, and even boxed for eight years for a junior boys club. He played on the golf team at High Point High School in Beltsville, Maryland.

== Amateur career ==
Funk went to the University of Maryland (UM) but was cut from the golf team in 1975. He transferred to Prince George's Community College and then returned to UM two years later to earn a top spot with the Terrapins golf team. At the time he also held a job as a circulation supervisor for the Washington Star. He graduated from the University of Maryland in 1980 with a degree in law enforcement.

== Professional career ==
In 1981, Funk turned professional. He worked as the golf coach for University of Maryland from 1982 to 1988.

After playing in a few PGA Tour events for several years beginning in 1982 but with little success, Funk finally became a member of the PGA Tour in 1989, playing in 29 official tournaments. He earned his biggest paycheck with $12,500 in a tie for ninth in the Chattanooga Classic.

In 1990, he struggled with consistency, missing the cut in nearly half the tournaments he entered. However, there were some bright spots, including a T-3 to earn $34,800 in the Chattanooga Classic as well as a fifth-place finish in the Buick Open to pocket $40,000. In 1991, he had slightly more success, with top-10 finishes in five tournaments.

Funk broke through in 1992 with his most successful year to date, including his first PGA Tour win. In May, he captured the Shell Houston Open with a 16-under score for a two-stroke win over Kirk Triplett and winnings of $216,000.

In 1995, he won his second PGA Tour tournament with a score of 16-under at the 1995 Ideon Classic at Pleasant Valley, for which he earned $180,000. He followed that up with a win just two months later at the Buick Challenge, with another 16-under for $180,000.

Funk was a member of the United States teams at the 2003 and 2005 Presidents Cup and the 2004 Ryder Cup. He received some criticism in 2004 for opting out of The Open Championship, one of the tour's four major tournaments, despite having qualified. He played instead in that week's B.C. Open, a much less prestigious event, but one which also offered Ryder Cup ranking points.

In 2005, Funk scored his biggest PGA Tour win when he captured The Players Championship, also becoming its oldest winner at 48 years, 9 months, 14 days by defeating Tom Lehman, Scott Verplank and Luke Donald by a stroke. He earned $1.44 million for the win.

=== Senior career ===
Since turning 50 in June 2006, Funk has been eligible for Champions Tour events and debuted in the 2006 U.S. Senior Open. When he turned 50, he still featured in the top 50 of the Official World Golf Ranking.

He won a further PGA Tour tournament, his eighth career win, in 2007 after his senior debut, becoming only the second over-50 player to win on the PGA Tour in 31 years. That win came at the Mayakoba Golf Classic at Riviera Maya-Cancun. By winning, Funk became the first man to win a PGA Tour event held in Mexico and, at age 50 years, 8 months and 12 days, became the fifth-oldest champion in PGA Tour history and the oldest since Art Wall Jr. (51 years, 7 months, 10 days) at the 1975 Greater Milwaukee Open.

In August 2008, Funk won his first senior major, the JELD-WEN Tradition.

After years of chronic knee pain, Funk underwent a total knee replacement in 2009. Later that year, on June 8, 2009, he became the oldest qualifier, at age 53, for the U.S. Open at Bethpage Black by shooting 139 over 36 holes at Woodmont Country Club in Rockville, Maryland, surviving a playoff. In August 2009, Funk won his second major championship on the Champions Tour at the 2009 U.S. Senior Open at Crooked Stick Golf Club in Carmel, Indiana. Funk dominated the rest of the field and cruised to a six-stroke victory over Joey Sindelar.

With his third senior major victory at the 2010 Jeld-Wen Tradition, he became the first player to win a PGA Tour-sanctioned event after knee-replacement surgery.

Funk's fans are referred to as "Funk's Punks." Two songs — Play That Funky Music and Give Up the Funk — have become theme songs for the Funk's Punks.

Funk has publicly endorsed a number of products including clubs, greens, and golf balls. He maintains professional relationships with Southwest Greens, TaylorMade for its clubs, Titleist golf balls, and Stryker Orthopaedics.

As of the 2013–14 season at age 57, Funk still played in several PGA Tour events a year while devoting most of his time to the Champions Tour.

At the end of the 2013 season, Funk ranked 38th in career PGA Tour earnings with just over $21 million in earnings. He ranked 23rd in all-time Champions Tour earnings with over $9.1 million.

== Personal life ==
In the 1980s, Funk got married for the first time. He has a son, Eric Justin, born in 1991. He was divorced in 1992.

In 1994, Funk married Sharon (née Archer), the daughter of Texan congressman Bill Archer. They have two children. Their son, Taylor Christian, played golf for Ponte Vedra High School and won the Florida 2A state championship. Taylor turned professional in 2017.

== Awards and honors ==
- Funk was inducted into the University of Maryland Athletic Hall of Fame.
- Funk has been enshrined into Maryland Athletic Hall of Fame.

== Professional wins (29) ==
=== PGA Tour wins (8) ===
Legend
Players Championships (1)
Other PGA Tour (7)

No.	Date	Tournament	Winning score	Margin of victory	Runner(s)-up
1	May 3, 1992	Shell Houston Open	−16 (68-72-62-70=272)	2 strokes	(United States) Kirk Triplett
2	Jul 30, 1995	Ideon Classic at Pleasant Valley	−16 (66-63-66-73=268)	1 stroke	(United States) Jim McGovern
3	Oct 1, 1995	Buick Challenge	−16 (69-67-69-67=272)	1 stroke	(United States) John Morse, (United States) Loren Roberts
4	Sep 22, 1996	B.C. Open	−16 (68-66-63=197) (Note: Shortened to 54 holes due to weather.)	Playoff	(United States) Pete Jordan
5	Jul 19, 1998	Deposit Guaranty Golf Classic	−18 (69-64-69-68=270)	2 strokes	(United States) Paul Goydos, (United States) Franklin Langham, (United States) Tim Loustalot
6	Oct 3, 2004	Southern Farm Bureau Classic (2)	−22 (69-67-64-66=266)	1 stroke	(United States) Ryan Palmer
7	Mar 28, 2005	The Players Championship	−9 (65-72-71-71=279)	1 stroke	(England) Luke Donald, (United States) Tom Lehman, (United States) Scott Verplank
8	Feb 25, 2007	Mayakoba Golf Classic	−14 (62-69-64-71=266)	Playoff	(Argentina) José Cóceres

PGA Tour playoff record (2–3)

No.	Year	Tournament	Opponent(s)	Result
1	1996	B.C. Open	(United States) Pete Jordan	Won with birdie on first extra hole
2	1996	Buick Challenge	(United States) Michael Bradley, (United States) Davis Love III, (United States) John Maginnes, (United States) Len Mattiace	Bradley won with birdie on first extra hole
3	1998	Buick Challenge	(Australia) Steve Elkington	Lost to par on first extra hole
4	1999	B.C. Open	(United States) Brad Faxon	Lost to par on second extra hole
5	2007	Mayakoba Golf Classic	(Argentina) José Cóceres	Won with birdie on second extra hole

=== Other wins (12) ===
- 1977 Middle Atlantic PGA Championship
- 1978 Middle Atlantic PGA Championship
- 1979 Middle Atlantic PGA Championship
- 1983 Maryland Open
- 1984 Foot-Joy PGA Assistant Professional Championship
- 1987 Maryland Open, Middle Atlantic PGA Championship
- 1988 Middle Atlantic PGA Championship
- 1989 Middle Atlantic PGA Championship
- 1993 Mexican Open
- 2005 Merrill Lynch Skins Game (unofficial money event-PGA Tour), CVS Charity Classic (with Chris DiMarco)

=== PGA Tour Champions wins (9) ===
Legend
Champions Tour major championships (3)
Other Champions Tour (6)

No.	Date	Tournament	Winning score	Margin of victory	Runner(s)-up
1	Oct 22, 2006	AT&T Championship	−12 (65-67-69=201)	1 stroke	(United States) Chip Beck
2	Jan 28, 2007	Turtle Bay Championship	−23 (65-64-64=193)	11 strokes	(United States) Tom Kite, (Japan) Kiyoshi Murota, (United States) Tom Purtzer, (United States) Loren Roberts, (Zimbabwe) Denis Watson
3	Jan 20, 2008	MasterCard Championship	−21 (67-63-65=195)	2 strokes	(United States) Allen Doyle
4	Aug 17, 2008	JELD-WEN Tradition	−19 (69-66-65-69=269)	3 strokes	(United States) Mike Goodes
5	Aug 2, 2009	U.S. Senior Open	−20 (68-67-68-66=268)	6 strokes	(United States) Joey Sindelar
6	Aug 2, 2010	JELD-WEN Tradition (2)	−12 (68-69-70-69=276)	1 stroke	(United States) Michael Allen, (Taiwan) Lu Chien-soon
7	May 6, 2012	Insperity Championship	−14 (66-69-67=202)	1 stroke	(United States) Tom Lehman
8	Oct 14, 2012	Greater Hickory Classic at Rock Barn	−15 (66-66-69=201)	1 stroke	(United States) Duffy Waldorf
9	Jun 8, 2014	Big Cedar Lodge Legends of Golf (with (United States) Jeff Sluman)	−20 (61-50-48=159)	1 stroke	(United States) Jay Haas and (United States) Peter Jacobsen

Champions Tour playoff record (0–3)

No.	Year	Tournament	Opponent(s)	Result
1	2009	Principal Charity Classic	(Republic of Ireland) Mark McNulty, (Zimbabwe) Nick Price	McNulty won with birdie on fourth extra hole Price eliminated by birdie on second hole
2	2009	The Senior Open Championship	(Republic of Ireland) Mark McNulty, (United States) Loren Roberts	Roberts won with par on third extra hole Funk eliminated by birdie on first hole
3	2010	Posco E&C Songdo Championship	(United States) Russ Cochran	Lost to birdie on first extra hole

== Results in major championships ==
Tournament	1985	1986	1987	1988	1989
Masters Tournament					
U.S. Open	T23	CUT	CUT		CUT
The Open Championship					
PGA Championship			T47		

Tournament	1990	1991	1992	1993	1994	1995	1996	1997	1998	1999
Masters Tournament				CUT	T38		T36	T17	CUT	CUT
U.S. Open		CUT	T33	T7	T44	CUT	CUT	T43		CUT
The Open Championship			73							WD
PGA Championship		T57	CUT	T44	T55	T39	T26	T61	T23	73

Tournament	2000	2001	2002	2003	2004	2005	2006	2007	2008	2009
Masters Tournament	T37			CUT	CUT	CUT	CUT	CUT		
U.S. Open	CUT	T44		T35	6	T23	T40	T30		60
The Open Championship	CUT			CUT		CUT	T66			
PGA Championship	T9	T70	T4	T7	CUT	T47	T20	CUT		

Tournament	2010	2011
Masters Tournament		
U.S. Open	T70	CUT
The Open Championship		
PGA Championship		

Top 10
Did not play

WD = withdrew
CUT = missed the half-way cut
"T" indicates a tie for a place

=== Summary ===
Tournament	Wins	2nd	3rd	Top-5	Top-10	Top-25	Events	Cuts made
Masters Tournament	0	0	0	0	0	1	12	4
U.S. Open	0	0	0	0	2	4	22	13
The Open Championship	0	0	0	0	0	0	6	2
PGA Championship	0	0	0	1	3	5	18	15
Totals	0	0	0	1	5	10	58	34

- Most consecutive cuts made – 5 (1993 U.S. Open – 1994 PGA)
- Longest streak of top-10s – 1 (five times)

== The Players Championship ==
=== Wins (1) ===
Year	Championship	54 holes	Winning score	Margin	Runners-up
2005	The Players Championship	4 shot deficit	−9 (65-72-71-71=279)	1 stroke	(England) Luke Donald, (United States) Tom Lehman, (United States) Scott Verplank

=== Results timeline ===
Tournament	1991	1992	1993	1994	1995	1996	1997	1998	1999
The Players Championship	CUT	T60	T39	T78	T61	T13	T14	T69	T38

Tournament	2000	2001	2002	2003	2004	2005	2006	2007	2008	2009	2010
The Players Championship	T13	T33	CUT	T45	T10	1	T16	CUT	CUT	T79	T39

Win
Top 10

CUT = missed the halfway cut
"T" indicates a tie for a place.

== Results in World Golf Championships ==
Tournament	1999	2000	2001	2002	2003	2004	2005	2006	2007
Match Play	R64	R64	R64		R64	R64	R64	R64	
Championship	T7		NT^{1}	T49	T40		T29		
Invitational				T2	T14	T61	T41	T42	T69

^{1}Cancelled due to 9/11

Top 10
Did not play

QF, R16, R32, R64 = Round in which player lost in match play
"T" = Tied
NT = No tournament

== Senior major championships ==
=== Wins (3) ===
Year	Championship	Winning score	Margin	Runner(s)-up
2008	JELD-WEN Tradition	−19 (69-66-65-69=269)	3 strokes	(United States) Mike Goodes
2009	U.S. Senior Open	−20 (68-67-68-66=268)	6 strokes	(United States) Joey Sindelar
2010	JELD-WEN Tradition (2)	−12 (68-69-70-69=276)	1 stroke	(United States) Michael Allen, (Taiwan) Lu Chien-soon

=== Results timeline ===
Results not in chronological order before 2022.

Tournament	2006	2007	2008	2009	2010	2011	2012	2013	2014	2015	2016	2017	2018	2019	2020	2021	2022	2023	2024	2025	2026
Senior PGA Championship	–			T5	T23	T39	CUT	T13	T39	CUT	T44	T38	76	CUT	NT	T57			T72	WD	
The Tradition		11	1	T5	1	T18	T9	T12	T16	T9	32	T4	42	T53	NT	T48	WD		T71		
U.S. Senior Open	T11		2	1	T43	T50	T2	2	T33	T20	WD		CUT	CUT	NT	CUT	CUT	CUT	CUT	CUT	
Senior Players Championship	T11	T3	2	T7	T16		T9	T18	T65	T39	T49	T6	WD		WD	70	T71	75			
Senior British Open Championship				T2	T3	T7	T57	T69	T29	T34	CUT	CUT		T46	NT				CUT	CUT	CUT

Win
Top 10
Did not play

CUT = missed the half-way cut
WD = withdrew
"T" indicates a tie for a place
NT = no tournament due to COVID-19 pandemic

== U.S. national team appearances ==
Professional

- Ryder Cup: 2004
- Presidents Cup: 2003 (tie), 2005 (winners)
- UBS Cup: 2002 (winners), 2004 (winners)
- Wendy's 3-Tour Challenge (representing Champions Tour): 2007, 2008 (winners), 2009, 2012, 2013

== See also ==
- 1988 PGA Tour Qualifying School graduates
- 1989 PGA Tour Qualifying School graduates
- List of golfers with most PGA Tour wins
