= 2006 Champions Tour =

Golf tour season

2007 Champions Tour season
- Duration: January 20, 2006 – October 30, 2006
- Number of official events: 28 (Note: One further tournament was scheduled but was canceled.)
- Most wins: (United States) Jay Haas (4) (United States) Loren Roberts (4)
- Charles Schwab Cup: (United States) Jay Haas
- Money list: (United States) Jay Haas
- Player of the Year: (United States) Jay Haas
- Rookie of the Year: (Argentina) Eduardo Romero

The 2006 Champions Tour was the 27th season of the Champions Tour (formerly the Senior PGA Tour), the main professional golf tour in the United States for men aged 50 and over.

== Schedule ==
The following table lists official events during the 2006 season.

Date	Tournament	Location	Purse (US$)	Winner (Note: The number in parentheses after each winner's name is the number of Champions Tour events they had won up to and including that tournament. This information is only shown for Champions Tour members.)	Notes
Jan 22	MasterCard Championship	Hawaii	1,700,000	(United States) Loren Roberts (2)	
Jan 29	Turtle Bay Championship	Hawaii	1,500,000	(United States) Loren Roberts (3)	
Feb 19	ACE Group Classic	Florida	1,600,000	(United States) Loren Roberts (4)	
Feb 26	Outback Steakhouse Pro-Am	Florida	1,600,000	(United States) Jerry Pate (1)	Pro-Am
Mar 12	AT&T Classic	California	1,600,000	(United States) Tom Kite (8)	
Mar 20	Toshiba Classic	California	1,650,000	(United States) Brad Bryant (1)	
Apr 2	Puerto Vallarta Blue Agave Golf Classic	Mexico	1,600,000	(United States) Morris Hatalsky (3)	New tournament
Apr 23	Liberty Mutual Legends of Golf	Georgia	2,500,000	(United States) Jay Haas (3)	
Apr 30	FedEx Kinko's Classic	Texas	1,600,000	(United States) Jay Haas (4)	
May 7	Regions Charity Classic	Alabama	1,600,000	(United States) Brad Bryant (2)	
May 14	Boeing Championship at Sandestin	Florida	1,600,000	(United States) Bobby Wadkins (2)	
May 28	Senior PGA Championship	Oklahoma	2,000,000	(United States) Jay Haas (5)	Senior major championship
Jun 4	Allianz Championship	Iowa	1,500,000	(United States) Gil Morgan (24)	
~~Jun 11~~	Bank of America Championship	Massachusetts	–	Canceled	
Jun 25	Commerce Bank Championship	New York	1,500,000	(United States) John Harris (1)	
Jul 2	Greater Kansas City Golf Classic	Kansas	1,650,000	(United States) Dana Quigley (11)	
Jul 9	U.S. Senior Open	Kansas	2,600,000	(United States) Allen Doyle (11)	Senior major championship
Jul 16	Ford Senior Players Championship	Michigan	2,500,000	(United States) Bobby Wadkins (3)	Champions Tour major championship
Jul 30	The Senior British Open Championship	Scotland	1,800,000	(United States) Loren Roberts (5)	Senior major championship
Aug 6	3M Championship	Minnesota	1,750,000	(United States) David Edwards (1)	
Aug 20	Boeing Greater Seattle Classic	Washington	1,600,000	(United States) Tom Kite (9)	
Aug 27	JELD-WEN Tradition	Oregon	2,500,000	(Argentina) Eduardo Romero (1)	Champions Tour major championship
Sep 3	Wal-Mart First Tee Open at Pebble Beach	California	2,000,000	(United States) Scott Simpson (1)	
Sep 17	Constellation Energy Classic	Maryland	1,700,000	(United States) Bob Gilder (9)	
Oct 1	Greater Hickory Classic at Rock Barn	North Carolina	1,600,000	(United States) Andy Bean (1)	
Oct 8	SAS Championship	North Carolina	2,000,000	(United States) Tom Jenkins (7)	
Oct 15	Administaff Small Business Classic	Texas	1,600,000	(United States) Jay Haas (6)	
Oct 23	AT&T Championship	Texas	1,600,000	(United States) Fred Funk (1)	
Oct 30	Charles Schwab Cup Championship	California	2,500,000	(United States) Jim Thorpe (12)	Tour Championship

=== Unofficial events ===
The following events were sanctioned by the Champions Tour, but did not carry official money, nor were wins official.

Date	Tournament	Location	Purse ($)	Winners	Notes
Dec 3	Del Webb Father/Son Challenge	Florida	1,000,000	(Germany) Bernhard Langer and son Stefan Langer	Team event

== Charles Schwab Cup ==
The Charles Schwab Cup was based on tournament results during the season, calculated using a points-based system.

Position	Player	Points
1	(United States) Jay Haas	3,053
2	(United States) Loren Roberts	3,033
3	(United States) Tom Kite	1,910
4	(United States) Brad Bryant	1,685
5	(Argentina) Eduardo Romero	1,546

== Money list ==
The money list was based on prize money won during the season, calculated in U.S. dollars.

Position	Player	Prize money ($)
1	(United States) Jay Haas	2,420,227
2	(United States) Loren Roberts	2,365,395
3	(United States) Brad Bryant	1,692,417
4	(United States) Tom Kite	1,643,348
5	(United States) Gil Morgan	1,525,050

== Awards ==
Award	Winner	Ref.
Player of the Year (Jack Nicklaus Trophy)	(United States) Jay Haas	
Rookie of the Year	(Argentina) Eduardo Romero	
Scoring leader (Byron Nelson Award)	(United States) Loren Roberts	
Comeback Player of the Year	(United States) Tim Simpson	
