= Loren Roberts =

American professional golfer (born 1955)

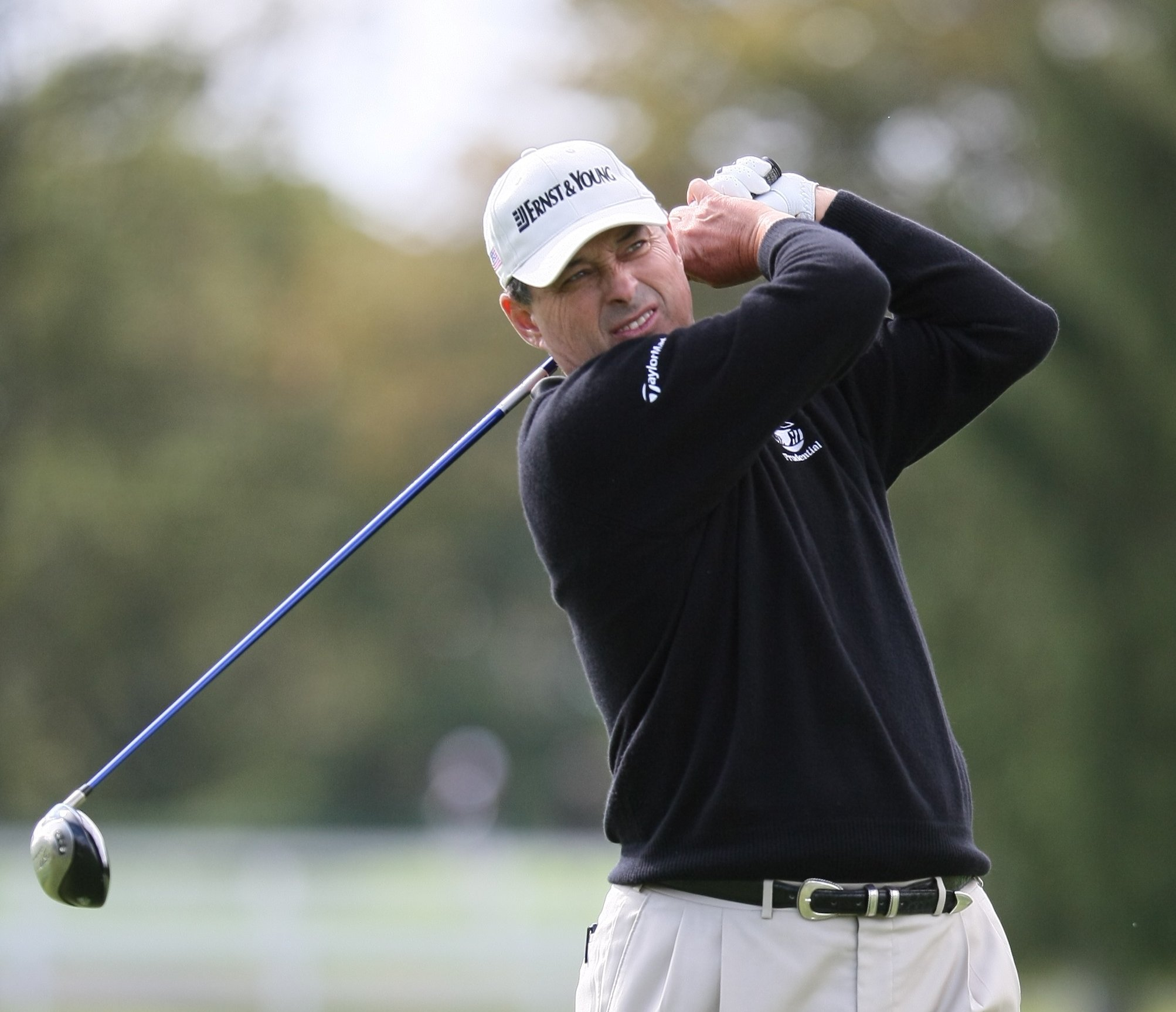
- Roberts in 2009

Personal information
- Full name: Loren Lloyd Roberts
- Nickname: Boss of the Moss
- Nationality: United States
- Born: June 24, 1955 (age 71) San Luis Obispo, California, U.S.
- Height: 6 ft 2 in (1.88 m)
- Weight: 215 lb (98 kg; 15.4 st)

Career
- Sport: Golf
- College: California Polytechnic State University
- Turned professional: 1975
- Current tour: PGA Tour Champions
- Former tour: PGA Tour
- Professional wins: 26
- Highest ranking: 11 (February 11, 1996)

Number of wins by tour
- PGA Tour: 8
- PGA Tour Champions: 13
- European Senior Tour: 2

Best results in major championships
- Masters Tournament: T3: 2000
- PGA Championship: T5: 1990
- U.S. Open: T2: 1994
- The Open Championship: T7: 2000

Achievements and awards
- Champions Tour Byron Nelson Award: 2006, 2007
- Champions Tour Charles Schwab Cup winner: 2007, 2009

Loren Lloyd Roberts (born June 24, 1955) is an American professional golfer, who has played on the PGA Tour and the PGA Tour Champions.

== Early life ==
Roberts was born in San Luis Obispo, California. He competed for San Luis Obispo Senior High School and California Polytechnic State University. In 1975, he turned professional after his sophomore season due to the university's dropping its NCAA Division II golf team.

== Professional career ==
In the late 1970s, Roberts worked for Dennis Pogue as an assistant pro at San Luis Obispo Golf and Country Club as well as Morro Bay Golf Course. He won the Foot-Joy PGA Assistant Professional Championship of 1979 and was second in 1980. The first professional tour where he briefly competed was the PGA Tour of Australasia, after his 1979 PGA victory.

On his fifth attempt, Roberts earned his PGA Tour card at the PGA Tour Qualification Tournament in 1980 for the 1981 season. He returned to the tournament in 1981, 1982, 1986 and 1987, earning his card every year except 1981. He did not get his first win on the PGA Tour until 1994 at age 38, yet it sparked a nine-season run of eight victories. His career earnings are over $15 million. He is known as "Boss of the Moss" for his putting skills. He has featured in the top 20 of the Official World Golf Rankings.

Roberts' best finish in a major was tie for 2nd place at the 1994 U.S. Open. He contended in an 18-hole playoff with Ernie Els and Colin Montgomerie. Montgomerie was eliminated. An additional pair of sudden-death holes gave Els the title.

Roberts played for the United States in the 1995 Ryder Cup, 1994 and 2000 Presidents Cups, and 2001 UBS Warburg Cup. He was 3–1 at the Ryder Cup, 4-2-1 at the Presidents Cups, and 1–2 at the UBS Warburg Cup. Of the four team events, only the Ryder Cup team lost. He was a co-assistant captain for the 2006 Ryder Cup which was also defeated by the European team.

After concentrating on the Champions Tour in 2006, Roberts went without a PGA Tour card for the 2007 and 2008 seasons, passing on using his exemption for being among the top 50 in career earnings. He used the exemption for the 2009 season.

In the middle of his regular career, in 1995, Roberts began hosting the annual Loren Roberts Celebrity Pro-Am in May at Spring Creek Ranch in Collierville, Tennessee. The benefitting charity is Le Bonheur Children's Medical Center of Memphis, Tennessee.

Roberts wrote Focus: The Name of the Game with fellow PGA Tour golfers Scott Simpson and Larry Mize. The 128-page book was published by J. Countryman in 1999.

=== Senior career ===
In 2005, Roberts joined the Champions Tour. His first senior win came in his third event at the JELD-WEN Tradition, one of five senior majors. He defeated Dana Quigley in a two-hole sudden-death playoff.

In 2006, Roberts became the first golfer to open a Champions Tour season with three wins. Later that season he won his second senior major by beating Eduardo Romero in a playoff at the Senior British Open. He won the Byron Nelson Award for lowest average stroke total per round.

In 2009, he won his second Senior British Open title after beating Fred Funk and Mark McNulty in a playoff. He won a month later in August at the Boeing Classic, where he denied Mark O'Meara his first Champions Tour victory, defeating him by one stroke after making birdie on the final hole. The GWAA voted him Player of the Year.

He broke 54-hole tournament record for lowest score in relationship to par (25-under) and most birdies (26) as well as sharing lowest score (191). The marks were set largely due to scoring a career-best 61 in the final round of his 2006 MasterCard Championship at Hualalai win.

== Personal life ==
Since the 1980s, Roberts has been a resident of Germantown, Tennessee.

== Awards and honors ==
- In 1995 and 2007, Roberts was named Professional co-Athlete of the Year by the Tennessee Sports Hall of Fame.
- In 1998, he was inducted into the Cal Poly-SLO Athletics Hall of Fame.
- In 2008, the Tennessee Golf Foundation inducted him into the Tennessee Golf Hall of Fame.

== Professional wins (25) ==
=== PGA Tour wins (8) ===
No.	Date	Tournament	Winning score	Margin of victory	Runner(s)-up
1	Mar 20, 1994	Nestle Invitational	−13 (70-70-68-67=275)	1 stroke	(Zimbabwe) Nick Price, (Fiji) Vijay Singh, (United States) Fuzzy Zoeller
2	Mar 19, 1995	Nestle Invitational (2)	−16 (68-65-68-71=272)	2 strokes	(United States) Brad Faxon
3	Apr 21, 1996	MCI Classic	−19 (66-69-63-67=265)	3 strokes	(United States) Mark O'Meara
4	Sep 1, 1996	Greater Milwaukee Open	−19 (66-65-66-68=265)	Playoff	(United States) Jerry Kelly
5	Sep 14, 1997	CVS Charity Classic	−18 (67-67-68-64=266)	1 stroke	(United States) Bill Glasson
6	May 16, 1999	GTE Byron Nelson Classic	−18 (66-66-62-68=262)	Playoff	(United States) Steve Pate
7	Jul 16, 2000	Greater Milwaukee Open (2)	−24 (65-66-63-66=260)	8 strokes	(United States) Franklin Langham
8	Sep 29, 2002	Valero Texas Open	−19 (67-63-67-64=261)	3 strokes	(United States) Fred Couples, (United States) Fred Funk, (United States) Garrett Willis

PGA Tour playoff record (2–1)

No.	Year	Tournament	Opponent(s)	Result
1	1994	U.S. Open	(South Africa) Ernie Els, (Scotland) Colin Montgomerie	Els won with par on second extra hole after 18-hole playoff; Els: +3 (74), Roberts: +3 (74), Montgomerie: +7 (78)
2	1996	Greater Milwaukee Open	(United States) Jerry Kelly	Won with birdie on first extra hole
3	1999	GTE Byron Nelson Classic	(United States) Steve Pate	Won with par on first extra hole

=== Other wins (5) ===
This list may be incomplete.

- 1979 Foot-Joy PGA Assistant Professional Championship
- 1992 Ben Hogan Pebble Beach Invitational
- 1997 Callaway Golf Pebble Beach Invitational
- 1999 Tennessee Open
- 2010 Straight Down Fall Classic (with Michael Rowley)

=== Champions Tour wins (13) ===
Legend
Champions Tour major championships (4)
Other Champions Tour (9)

No.	Date	Tournament	Winning score	Margin of victory	Runner(s)-up
1	Aug 28, 2005	JELD-WEN Tradition	−15 (67-69-70-67=273)	Playoff	(United States) Dana Quigley
2	Jan 22, 2006	MasterCard Championship	−25 (63-67-61=191)	1 stroke	(United States) Don Pooley
3	Jan 29, 2006	Turtle Bay Championship	−12 (66-66-72=204)	2 strokes	(United States) Scott Simpson
4	Feb 19, 2006	ACE Group Classic	−14 (67-66-69=202)	1 stroke	(United States) R. W. Eaks, (United States) Brad Bryant
5	Jul 30, 2006	The Senior British Open Championship	−6 (65-65-69-75=274)	Playoff	(Argentina) Eduardo Romero
6	Jun 3, 2007	Boeing Championship at Sandestin	−16 (65-67-65=197)	3 strokes	(Argentina) Eduardo Romero
7	Oct 7, 2007	Constellation Energy Senior Players Championship	−13 (67-66-67-67=267)	6 strokes	(United States) Tom Watson
8	Jun 29, 2008	Commerce Bank Championship	−12 (65-68-68=201)	1 stroke	(Zimbabwe) Nick Price, (United States) Lonnie Nielsen
9	Feb 22, 2009	ACE Group Classic (2)	−7 (70-71-68=209)	1 stroke	(United States) Gene Jones
10	Jul 26, 2009	The Senior Open Championship (2)	−12 (66-68-67-67=268)	Playoff	(United States) Fred Funk, (Republic of Ireland) Mark McNulty
11	Aug 31, 2009	Boeing Classic	−18 (68-65-65=198)	1 stroke	(United States) Mark O'Meara
12	Jun 27, 2010	Dick's Sporting Goods Open	−15 (68-68-65=201)	1 stroke	(United States) Fred Funk
13	Mar 18, 2012	Toshiba Classic	−8 (66-70-69=205)	2 strokes	(United States) Mark Calcavecchia, (United States) Tom Kite, (Germany) Bernhard Langer

Champions Tour playoff record (3–2)

No.	Year	Tournament	Opponent(s)	Result
1	2005	JELD-WEN Tradition	(United States) Dana Quigley	Won with bogey on second extra hole
2	2006	The Senior British Open Championship	(Argentina) Eduardo Romero	Won with par on first extra hole
3	2007	AT&T Classic	(United States) Tom Purtzer	Lost to birdie on fourth extra hole
4	2008	AT&T Champions Classic	(United States) Brad Bryant, (Zimbabwe) Denis Watson	Watson won with birdie on third extra hole Bryant eliminated by birdie on second hole
5	2009	The Senior Open Championship	(United States) Fred Funk, (Republic of Ireland) Mark McNulty	Won with par on third extra hole Funk eliminated by birdie on first hole

== Results in major championships ==
Tournament	1985	1986	1987	1988	1989
Masters Tournament					
U.S. Open	T34		CUT		CUT
The Open Championship					
PGA Championship	CUT				T34

Tournament	1990	1991	1992	1993	1994	1995	1996	1997	1998	1999
Masters Tournament		CUT			T5	T24	T23	CUT		CUT
U.S. Open		T49		T11	T2	WD	T40	T13	T18	
The Open Championship					T24	CUT	T18	CUT	T29	
PGA Championship	T5	T27		T28	T9	T58	CUT	T49	T65	CUT

Tournament	2000	2001	2002	2003	2004	2005	2006	2007	2008	2009	2010
Masters Tournament	T3	T37		T33							
U.S. Open	T8	T52		T42							
The Open Championship	T7	T13	T28					CUT			CUT
PGA Championship	T58	CUT	T43	T7	T17	CUT					

Top 10
Did not play

CUT = missed the halfway cut
WD = withdrew
"T" indicates a tie for a place

=== Summary ===
Tournament	Wins	2nd	3rd	Top-5	Top-10	Top-25	Events	Cuts made
Masters Tournament	0	0	1	2	2	4	9	6
U.S. Open	0	1	0	1	2	5	13	10
The Open Championship	0	0	0	0	1	4	10	6
PGA Championship	0	0	0	1	3	4	17	12
Totals	0	1	1	4	8	17	49	34

- Most consecutive cuts made – 9 (1991 U.S. Open – 1995 Masters)
- Longest streak of top-10s – 3 (2000 Masters – 2000 Open Championship)

== Results in The Players Championship ==
Tournament	1985	1986	1987	1988	1989	1990	1991	1992	1993	1994	1995	1996	1997	1998	1999	2000	2001	2002	2003	2004	2005	2006
The Players Championship	CUT	T40		CUT	T14	T46	T27	T21	CUT	T14	T34	T33	3	CUT	CUT	CUT	CUT	T49	71	T66	CUT	CUT

Top 10
Did not play

CUT = missed the halfway cut
"T" indicates a tie for a place

== Results in World Golf Championships ==
Tournament	1999	2000	2001	2002	2003	2004	2005
Match Play	R16	R64			R64	R32	R64
Championship	T40		NT^{1}		T16		
Invitational		14	T29	T28			

^{1}Cancelled due to 9/11

Top 10
Did not play

QF, R16, R32, R64 = Round in which player lost in match play
"T" = Tied
NT = No tournament

== Senior major championships ==
=== Wins (4) ===
Year	Championship	Winning score	Margin	Runner(s)-up
2005	JELD-WEN Tradition	−15 (67-69-70-67=273)	Playoff	(United States) Dana Quigley
2006	The Senior Open Championship	−6 (65-65-69-75=274)	Playoff	(Argentina) Eduardo Romero
2007	Constellation Energy Senior Players Championship	−13 (67-66-67-67=267)	6 strokes	(United States) Tom Watson
2009	The Senior Open Championship (2)	−12 (66-68-67-67=268)	Playoff	(United States) Fred Funk, (Republic of Ireland) Mark McNulty

=== Results timeline ===
Results not in chronological order before 2017.

Tournament	2005	2006	2007	2008	2009	2010	2011	2012	2013	2014	2014	2015	2016	2017	2018	2019	2020
The Tradition	1	T14	T4	T7	T5	T15	3	T25	T22	T31	WD			T34	WD		NT
Senior PGA Championship	–	5	T12	T49	T28	T15	T8	T12	T47	WD	CUT			T46			NT
U.S. Senior Open	T2	T8	3	T12	T4	T20	T17	T36	T14	T20	CUT		T9	CUT		CUT	NT
Senior Players Championship		T3	1	T21	T3	3	T28	T38	56	T22	T29		T20	T26		T46	T62
Senior British Open Championship	5	1	T4		1	T14		T27			CUT				T50		NT

Win
Top 10
Did not play

CUT = missed the halfway cut
WD = withdrew
"T" indicates a tie for a place
NT = No tournament due to COVID-19 pandemic

== U.S. national team appearances ==
This list may be incomplete.

Professional

- Ryder Cup: 1995
- Presidents Cup: 1994 (winners), 2000 (winners)
- UBS Warburg Cup: 2001 (winners)

== See also ==
- Fall 1980 PGA Tour Qualifying School graduates
- 1982 PGA Tour Qualifying School graduates
- 1983 PGA Tour Qualifying School graduates
- 1986 PGA Tour Qualifying School graduates
- 1987 PGA Tour Qualifying School graduates
- List of golfers with most Champions Tour major championship wins
- List of golfers with most Champions Tour wins
