= Columbus Southern Open =

Golf tournament in Georgia, US

The Columbus Southern Open was a golf tournament on the Champions Tour played only in 2003. It was played in Columbus, Georgia, at the Green Island Country Club. The purse for the tournament was US$1,500,000, with $225,000 going to the winner, Morris Hatalsky.
