= Boeing Classic =

American golf tournament

Coordinates: 47.535°N 121.860°W

Tournament information
- Location: Snoqualmie, Washington
- Established: 2005
- Course: Snoqualmie Ridge
- Par: 72
- Length: 7,234 yards (6,615 m)
- Tour: PGA Tour Champions
- Format: Stroke play
- Prize fund: $2,300,000
- Month played: August

Tournament record score
- Aggregate: 197 Jerry Kelly (2017), Stephen Ames (2023)
- To par: −19 as above

Current champion
- (United States) Stewart Cink

Location map
- Location in the United States Location in Washington

The Boeing Classic is a professional golf tournament in Washington on the PGA Tour Champions, founded 21 years ago in 2005. The 54-hole event is played annually in August in Snoqualmie, east of Seattle. It was titled the "Boeing Greater Seattle Classic" for its first two years and Boeing is the main sponsor.

== History ==
The Seattle area's previous senior tour event, the GTE Northwest Classic, ran from 1986 through 1995. The first edition was at Sahalee Country Club and the remainder were at Inglewood Golf Club in Kenmore.

Since its inception in 2005, the Boeing Classic has been held at The Club at Snoqualmie Ridge, a private course designed by Jack Nicklaus which opened for play 27 years ago in 1999 as TPC Snoqualmie Ridge. The course is 25 miles (40 km) east of Seattle at the foothills of the Cascade Range, and varies in elevation from 575 to 870 feet (175 to 265 m) above sea level, with the 18th green at 745 feet (227 m).

From 2007 to 2010, the tournament was played the week following the JELD-WEN Tradition, a senior major championship played in Sunriver, Oregon. For its first two years, the tournament immediately preceded The Tradition, which was then played at The Reserve near Portland. The Tradition moved to Alabama in 2011 and is played in May.

The purse for the 2007 tournament was $1.6 million, with $240,000 to the champion, Denis Watson, the winner of a playoff. The seven-man, sudden death playoff was the largest in tour history, with the seven finishing the 54 holes at 207 (−9). The tournament concluded when Watson sunk an eagle putt on the second playoff hole, a second replay of the par-5 18th hole.

The purse for 2008 was $1.7 million, with a winner's share of $255,000. The par-72 course was set at 7,183 yards (6,568 m). Tom Kite shot a final round 66 to finish at 202 (−14), two strokes ahead of second round leader Scott Simpson . Kite was the only player in the field to break 70 in all three rounds and became the first repeat winner of the event. Kite won the tournament in 2006 in a one-hole playoff over Keith Fergus, and was the runner-up in 2005, finishing three strokes behind David Eger.

The 2009 tournament was held on August 28–30 with a $1.8 million purse. Second-round co-leader Loren Roberts birdied the final two holes and outlasted Mark O'Meara by nearly matching his sterling tee shot at 17 and dribbled in a five-foot (1.5 m) birdie putt. Roberts birdied the uphill par-5 final hole with a short pitch shot to 3 feet (0.9 m) and dropped the putt for his third victory of the season. Roberts shot a 7-under 65 in the final round and set a new tournament record at 198 (–18).

In 2010, the U.S. Senior Open was held at Sahalee Country Club in nearby Sammamish, and won by Bernhard Langer with a final score of 272 (−8). The Boeing Classic was held four weeks after on August 27–29, also won by Langer by three strokes over Nick Price of Zimbabwe. Langer tied the record set the previous year by Roberts at 198.

The purse was raised to an even two million dollars in 2011, with a winner's share of $300,000. Half of the first twelve editions ended in playoffs.

== Course layout ==
| Hole | 1 | 2 | 3 | 4 | 5 | 6 | 7 | 8 | 9 | Out | 10 | 11 | 12 | 13 | 14 | 15 | 16 | 17 | 18 | In | Total |
|---|---|---|---|---|---|---|---|---|---|---|---|---|---|---|---|---|---|---|---|---|---|
| Yards | 554 | 410 | 439 | 426 | 475 | 207 | 375 | 529 | 207 | 3,622 | 353 | 462 | 426 | 210 | 431 | 590 | 380 | 211 | 498 | 3,561 | 7,183 |
| Par | 5 | 4 | 4 | 4 | 4 | 3 | 4 | 5 | 3 | 36 | 4 | 4 | 4 | 3 | 4 | 5 | 4 | 3 | 5 | 36 | 72 |

== Winners ==
| Year | Winner | Score | To par | Margin of victory | Runner(s)-up | Purse (US$) | Winner's share ($) |
Boeing Classic
| 2026 | (United States) Stewart Cink | 204 | −12 | Playoff | (Spain) Miguel Ángel Jiménez | 2,300,000 | 345,000 |
| 2025 | (Australia) Stephen Allan | 201 | −15 | 1 stroke | (United States) Stewart Cink | 2,200,000 | 330,000 |
| 2024 | (Canada) Stephen Ames (2) | 205 | −11 | 1 stroke | (New Zealand) Steven Alker (South Africa) Ernie Els (Sweden) Robert Karlsson | 2,200,000 | 330,000 |
| 2023 | (Canada) Stephen Ames | 197 | −19 | 7 strokes | (Spain) Miguel Ángel Jiménez | 2,200,000 | 330,000 |
| 2022 | (Spain) Miguel Ángel Jiménez | 201 | −15 | 2 strokes | (Australia) David McKenzie | 2,200,000 | 330,000 |
| 2021 | (Australia) Rod Pampling | 204 | −12 | 1 stroke | (United States) Jim Furyk (United States) Tim Herron (United States) Billy Mayfair | 2,100,000 | 315,000 |
| 2020 | Canceled due to the COVID-19 pandemic | | | | | | |
| 2019 | (United States) Brandt Jobe | 198 | −18 | 3 strokes | (United States) Tom Pernice Jr. | 2,100,000 | 315,000 |
| 2018 | (United States) Scott Parel | 198 | −18 | 3 strokes | (United States) Kevin Sutherland | 2,100,000 | 315,000 |
| 2017 | (United States) Jerry Kelly | 197 | −19 | 1 stroke | (United States) Jerry Smith | 2,100,000 | 315,000 |
| 2016 | (Germany) Bernhard Langer (2) | 203 | −13 | Playoff | (United States) Woody Austin (United States) Kevin Sutherland | 2,000,000 | 300,000 |
| 2015 | (United States) Billy Andrade | 207 | −9 | 1 stroke | (Germany) Bernhard Langer | 2,000,000 | 300,000 |
| 2014 | (United States) Scott Dunlap | 200 | −16 | Playoff | (United States) Mark Brooks | 2,000,000 | 300,000 |
| 2013 | (United States) John Riegger | 201 | −15 | 2 strokes | (United States) John Cook | 2,000,000 | 300,000 |
| 2012 | (United States) Jay Don Blake | 206 | −10 | Playoff | (United States) Mark O'Meara | 2,000,000 | 300,000 |
| 2011 | (United States) Mark Calcavecchia | 202 | −14 | Playoff | (United States) Russ Cochran | 2,000,000 | 300,000 |
| 2010 | (Germany) Bernhard Langer | 198 | −18 | 3 strokes | (Zimbabwe) Nick Price | 1,800,000 | 270,000 |
| 2009 | (United States) Loren Roberts | 198 | −18 | 1 stroke | (United States) Mark O'Meara | 1,800,000 | 270,000 |
| 2008 | (United States) Tom Kite (2) | 202 | −14 | 2 strokes | (United States) Scott Simpson | 1,700,000 | 255,000 |
| 2007 | (Zimbabwe) Denis Watson | 207 | −9 | Playoff | (United States) R. W. Eaks (United States) David Eger (United States) Gil Morgan (Japan) Naomichi Ozaki (United States) Dana Quigley (United States) Craig Stadler | 1,600,000 | 240,000 |
Boeing Greater Seattle Classic
| 2006 | (United States) Tom Kite | 201 | −15 | Playoff | (United States) Keith Fergus | 1,600,000 | 240,000 |
| 2005 | (United States) David Eger | 199 | −17 | 3 strokes | (United States) Tom Kite | 1,600,000 | 240,000 |

== Multiple winners ==
Three players have won this tournament more than once through 2024.

- 2 wins:
  - Tom Kite: 2006, 2008
  - Bernhard Langer: 2010, 2016
  - Stephen Ames: 2023, 2024

== Video ==
- YouTube − video highlights − 2006−2011
