= Valencia Country Club =

Golf course in Santa Clarita, California

- Location of the Valencia Country Club within Santa Clarita
- 34.4192°N 118.5778°W

Club information
- Location: 27330 Tourney Road, Santa Clarita, California 91355
- Established: 1965
- Type: Private
- Tota holes: 18

Valencia
- Designed by: Robert Trent Jones, Sr
- Par: 72
- Length: 7,076 yards (6,470 m)
- Course rating: 74.7
- Slope rating: 138

Valencia Country Club is an 18-hole golf course in the Valencia neighborhood in Santa Clarita, California. The course is a Robert Trent Jones design and was established in 1965.

In 1998, the course hosted the Los Angeles Open. The course took over duties as the host in 1998 as permanent host Riviera Country Club was the venue for the 1998 United States Senior Open.

Valencia Country Club also hosted the Champions Tour event the AT&T Champions Classic from 2001-2009.
