= Morris Hatalsky =

American professional golfer (born 1951)

Personal information
- Nickname: Mo-Cat
- Nationality: United States
- Born: November 10, 1951 (age 74) San Diego, California, U.S.
- Height: 5 ft 11 in (1.80 m)
- Weight: 175 lb (79 kg; 12.5 st)

Career
- Sport: Golf
- College: Arizona State University; U.S. International University
- Turned professional: 1973
- Former tour: PGA Tour
- Professional wins: 7

Number of wins by tour
- PGA Tour: 4
- PGA Tour Champions: 3

Best results in major championships
- Masters Tournament: T24: 1982
- PGA Championship: T14: 1990
- U.S. Open: T49: 1977
- The Open Championship: CUT: 1984

Achievements and awards
- Senior PGA Tour Rookie of the Year: 2002

Morris Hatalsky (born November 10, 1951) is an American professional golfer.

== Early years and amateur career ==
In 1951, Hatalsky was born in San Diego, California. He started in golf at age 10, when his older brother bought him a set of junior clubs. As an amateur, he won the 1968 Mexico National Junior Championship.

Hatalsky initially attended Arizona State University where his teammates on the golf team included future PGA Tour players Bob Gilder, Howard Twitty and Tom Purtzer. However, he transferred to U.S. International University (now Alliant International University). In 1972, Hatalsky was an NAIA All-American and served as team captain.

== Professional career ==
In 1973, Hatalsky turned professional. He qualified for the PGA Tour at the 1976 Qualifying School and won four times on tour between 1981 and 1990.

In 2002, Hatalsky took Rookie of the Year honors in his first season on the Champions Tour, and he was won three events at that level.

== Awards and honors ==
In 2002, Hatalsky earned Senior PGA Tour Rookie of the Year honors.

== Professional wins (7) ==
=== PGA Tour wins (4) ===
No.	Date	Tournament	Winning score	Margin of victory	Runner(s)-up
1	Sep 27, 1981	Hall of Fame	−9 (63-71-68-71=275)	2 strokes	(United States) Jerry Pate, (United States) D. A. Weibring
2	Jul 10, 1983	Greater Milwaukee Open	−13 (70-68-71-66=275)	Playoff	(United States) George Cadle
3	Jun 5, 1988	Kemper Open	−14 (68-66-68-72=274)	Playoff	(United States) Tom Kite
4	Jul 15, 1990	Bank of Boston Classic	−13 (70-68-69-68=275)	1 stroke	(United States) Scott Verplank

PGA Tour playoff record (2–1)

No.	Year	Tournament	Opponent	Result
1	1983	Greater Milwaukee Open	(United States) George Cadle	Won with par on second extra hole
2	1983	Miller High Life QCO	(United States) Danny Edwards	Lost to birdie on first extra hole
3	1988	Kemper Open	(United States) Tom Kite	Won with par on second extra hole

=== Champions Tour wins (3) ===
No.	Date	Tournament	Winning score	Margin of victory	Runner-up
1	Aug 25, 2002	Uniting Fore Care Classic	42 pts (19-11-12=42)	12 points	(United States) Jay Sigel
2	May 25, 2003	Columbus Southern Open	−12 (66-65-67=198)	1 stroke	(United States) Allen Doyle
3	Apr 2, 2006	Puerto Vallarta Blue Agave Golf Classic	−9 (70-67-70=207)	1 stroke	(United States) Scott Simpson

Champions Tour playoff record (0–1)

No.	Year	Tournament	Opponent	Result
1	2005	Blue Angels Classic	(United States) Jim Thorpe	Lost to birdie on third extra hole

== Results in major championships ==
Tournament	1977	1978	1979	1980	1981	1982	1983	1984	1985	1986	1987	1988	1989	1990	1991
Masters Tournament						T24	CUT	44					CUT		T29
U.S. Open	T49	CUT			T65	CUT		T52	T52						
Open Championship								CUT							
PGA Championship		T38		T59		T54	T47	CUT	T54		T56	CUT		T14	CUT

Did not play

CUT = missed the half-way cut
"T" indicates a tie for a place

== See also ==
- Spring 1976 PGA Tour Qualifying School graduates
- 1993 PGA Tour Qualifying School graduates
