= Andy Bean (golfer) =

American golfer (1953–2023)

Personal information
- Full name: Thomas Andrew Bean
- Nationality: United States
- Born: March 13, 1953 LaFayette, Georgia, U.S.
- Died: October 14, 2023 (aged 70) Lakeland, Florida, U.S.
- Height: 6 ft 4 in (1.93 m)
- Weight: 260 lb (120 kg; 19 st)
- Spouse: Debbie
- Children: 3

Career
- Sport: Golf
- College: University of Florida
- Turned professional: 1975
- Former tours: PGA Tour; Champions Tour
- Professional wins: 18

Number of wins by tour
- PGA Tour: 11
- Japan Golf Tour: 2
- PGA Tour Champions: 3
- Other: 2

Best results in major championships
- Masters Tournament: T10: 1982
- PGA Championship: 2nd/T2: 1980, 1989
- U.S. Open: T6: 1978
- The Open Championship: T2: 1983

Thomas Andrew Bean (March 13, 1953 – October 14, 2023) was an American professional golfer who played on the PGA Tour and the Champions Tour.

Bean won numerous tournaments at both the amateur and professional level. Bean won 11 PGA Tour events, including the 1986 Byron Nelson Golf Classic, and three events on the Champions Tour, including a nine-stroke victory at the 2008 Charles Schwab Cup Championship.

== Early life ==
Bean was born in LaFayette, Georgia, on March 13, 1953, and raised on Jekyll Island, Georgia, where his father was associated with a golf course. His family moved to Lakeland, Florida, when he was 15, and his father bought a golf course there.

== Amateur career ==
Bean attended the University of Florida in Gainesville, Florida, where he became a member of the Sigma Alpha Epsilon fraternity (Florida Upsilon Chapter) and played for coach Buster Bishop's Florida Gators men's golf team from 1972 to 1975. While he was a Florida student, he won four amateur tournaments. Bean and future fellow PGA Tour players Woody Blackburn, Phil Hancock, and Gary Koch were members of the Gators' 1973 team that won the Southeastern Conference (SEC) and NCAA Championships. He was a first-team All-SEC selection in 1973 and 1975, and an All-American in 1973, 1974 and 1975. He graduated from the University of Florida with a bachelor's degree in marketing in 1975.

== Professional career ==
Bean turned professional in 1975. He finished inside the top 35 on the money list from 1977 to 1986. In five of those years he was in the top seven. His first PGA Tour victory was at the Doral-Eastern Open in 1977, and his last was at the Byron Nelson Golf Classic in 1986. In 1978 he won three times. Bean played on the United States Ryder Cup team in 1979 and 1987 and spent several weeks ranked in the top 10 of the Official World Golf Rankings in 1986 and 1987.

Bean never won a major championship but he finished second three times. He had a solo second-place finish behind Jack Nicklaus at the 1980 PGA Championship. At the 1983 British Open, Bean and Hale Irwin finished tied for second, one stroke behind Tom Watson; and in the 1989 PGA Championship, Bean, Mike Reid, and Curtis Strange tied for second, one stroke behind Payne Stewart.

After turning 50 in March, 2003, Bean played on the Champions Tour, where he won for the first time at the 2006 Greater Hickory Classic at Rock Barn. In May, 2008, he added a second Champions Tour title with a victory in the Regions Charity Classic. He won the season ending Charles Schwab Cup Championship in 2008 at Sonoma, California, winning by nine shots over Gene Jones with a tournament record 20-under-par total.

== Personal life and death ==
Bean lived in Lakeland, Florida, where he enjoyed hunting and fishing. He and his wife Debbie had three daughters: Lauren, Lindsay, and Jordan.

Bean died from complications of double lung transplant surgery in Lakeland on October 14, 2023. He was 70.

== Awards and honors ==
- In 1978, Bean was inducted into the University of Florida Athletic Hall of Fame as a "Gator Great."
- In 2000, Bean was inducted into the Florida Sports Hall of Fame.

== Amateur wins ==
- 1974 Eastern Amateur, Falstaff Amateur
- 1975 Dixie Amateur, Western Amateur

== Professional wins (18) ==
=== PGA Tour wins (11) ===
No.	Date	Tournament	Winning score	Margin of victory	Runner(s)-up
1	Mar 13, 1977	Doral-Eastern Open	−11 (67-67-71-72=277)	1 stroke	(Australia) David Graham
2	Jun 4, 1978	Kemper Open	−15 (72-67-68-66=273)	5 strokes	(United States) Mark Hayes, (United States) Andy North
3	Jun 11, 1978	Danny Thomas Memphis Classic	−11 (70-68-69-70=277)	Playoff	(United States) Lee Trevino
4	Jul 2, 1978	Western Open	−6 (70-71-75-66=282)	Playoff	(United States) Bill Rogers
5	Jun 10, 1979	Atlanta Classic	−23 (70-67-61-67=265)	8 strokes	(United States) Joe Inman
6	Feb 10, 1980	Hawaiian Open	−22 (71-63-66-66=266)	3 strokes	(United States) Lee Trevino
7	Mar 1, 1981	Bay Hill Classic	−18 (68-62-67-69=266)	7 strokes	(United States) Tom Watson
8	Feb 28, 1982	Doral-Eastern Open (2)	−10 (68-69-72-69=278)	1 stroke	(United States) Scott Hoch, (United States) Mike Nicolette, (United States) Jerry Pate
9	Apr 8, 1984	Greater Greensboro Open	−8 (71-67-72-70=280)	2 strokes	(United States) George Archer
10	Mar 9, 1986	Doral-Eastern Open (3)	−12 (71-68-68-69=276)	Playoff	(United States) Hubert Green
11	May 11, 1986	Byron Nelson Golf Classic	−11 (66-68-67-68=269)	1 stroke	(United States) Mark Wiebe

PGA Tour playoff record (3–3)

No.	Year	Tournament	Opponent(s)	Result
1	1978	Danny Thomas Memphis Classic	(United States) Lee Trevino	Won with birdie on first extra hole
2	1978	Western Open	(United States) Bill Rogers	Won with par on first extra hole
3	1979	Bing Crosby National Pro-Am	(United States) Mark Hayes, (United States) Lon Hinkle	Hinkle won with birdie on third extra hole Bean eliminated by par on second hole
4	1984	Honda Classic	(United States) Bruce Lietzke	Lost to par on first extra hole
5	1984	Memorial Tournament	(United States) Jack Nicklaus	Lost to par on third extra hole
6	1986	Doral-Eastern Open	(United States) Hubert Green	Won with birdie on fourth extra hole

=== PGA of Japan Tour wins (2) ===
No.	Date	Tournament	Winning score	Margin of victory	Runner-up
1	Nov 26, 1978	Dunlop Phoenix Tournament	−13 (67-70-69-69=275)	5 strokes	(Australia) Graham Marsh
2	Nov 1, 1987	ABC Japan-U.S. Match	−19 (64-72-68-65=269)	5 strokes	(Japan) Masahiro Kuramoto

=== Other wins (2) ===
No.	Date	Tournament	Winning score	Margin of victory	Runner-up
1	Nov 15, 1986	Isuzu Kapalua International	−10 (72-68-68-70=278)	2 strokes	(United States) Davis Love III
2	Nov 14, 1987	Isuzu Kapalua International (2)	−21 (66-65-69-67=267)	3 strokes	(United States) Lanny Wadkins

=== Champions Tour wins (3) ===
Legend
Tour Championships (1)
Other Champions Tour (2)

No.	Date	Tournament	Winning score	Margin of victory	Runner-up
1	Oct 1, 2006	Greater Hickory Classic at Rock Barn	−15 (63-70-68=201)	Playoff	(United States) R. W. Eaks
2	May 18, 2008	Regions Charity Classic	−13 (65-68-70=203)	1 stroke	(United States) Loren Roberts
3	Nov 2, 2008	Charles Schwab Cup Championship	−20 (68-66-68-66=268)	9 strokes	(United States) Gene Jones

Champions Tour playoff record (1–0)

No.	Year	Tournament	Opponent	Result
1	2006	Greater Hickory Classic at Rock Barn	(United States) R. W. Eaks	Won with birdie on first extra hole

== Results in major championships ==
Tournament	1973	1974	1975	1976	1977	1978	1979
Masters Tournament					T19	T24	T28
U.S. Open	CUT	T63			T23	T6	T25
The Open Championship						T48	
PGA Championship					CUT	T7	T12

Tournament	1980	1981	1982	1983	1984	1985	1986	1987	1988	1989
Masters Tournament	T12	CUT	T10	CUT	T18	T25	CUT	T35	CUT	51
U.S. Open	CUT		WD	T34	T11	T15	T24	CUT	T12	CUT
The Open Championship	T6			T2	T14	T35	T14	T40	T16	CUT
PGA Championship	2		CUT	T30	T16	T3	T53	T65	CUT	T2

Tournament	1990	1991	1992	1993	1994	1995	1996	1997	1998	1999	2000
Masters Tournament	T33										
U.S. Open	CUT										CUT
The Open Championship											
PGA Championship	CUT	CUT									

Top 10
Did not play

CUT = missed the half-way cut
WD = withdrew
"T" indicates a tie for a place

=== Summary ===
Tournament	Wins	2nd	3rd	Top-5	Top-10	Top-25	Events	Cuts made
Masters Tournament	0	0	0	0	1	6	14	10
U.S. Open	0	0	0	0	1	7	16	9
The Open Championship	0	1	0	1	2	5	9	8
PGA Championship	0	2	1	3	4	6	14	9
Totals	0	3	1	4	8	24	53	36

- Most consecutive cuts made – 11 (1983 U.S. Open – 1985 PGA)
- Longest streak of top-10s – 2 (1980 Open Championship – 1980 PGA)

== Results in The Players Championship ==
Tournament	1977	1978	1979	1980	1981	1982	1983	1984	1985	1986	1987	1988	1989	1990	1991	1992
The Players Championship	CUT	T28	8	T51	WD	T35	CUT	CUT	CUT	T21	CUT	T36	T8	T9	CUT	CUT

Top 10

CUT = missed the halfway cut
WD = withdrew
"T" indicates a tie for a place

== U.S. national team appearances ==
- Ryder Cup: 1979 (winners), 1987

== See also ==
- Fall 1975 PGA Tour Qualifying School graduates
- 1995 PGA Tour Qualifying School graduates
- List of American Ryder Cup golfers
- List of Florida Gators men's golfers on the PGA Tour
- List of Sigma Alpha Epsilon members
- List of University of Florida alumni
- List of University of Florida Athletic Hall of Fame members
