= PGA Tour Champions awards =

Listed below are recipients of awards for various achievements on PGA Tour Champions, a circuit operated by the U.S.-based PGA Tour for men's golfers aged 50 and over. The tour began in 1980 as the Senior PGA Tour, changed its name to the Champions Tour in 2003, and became PGA Tour Champions in 2016.

== Charles Schwab Cup ==
From 2001 through 2015, points were earned for thousands of dollars earned in top-ten finishes at tournaments. From 2008 to 2015, points were doubled at majors and the Charles Schwab Cup Championship.

Since 2016, the Charles Schwab Cup has used a playoff format similar to the FedEx Cup playoffs on the regular PGA Tour, though with three total events instead of four on the regular tour. Changes to the format are:

- During the regular season, points are based on dollars earned, regardless of the player's finish in a given tournament. No bonus is awarded for wins in majors.
- The top 72 players on the money list will qualify for the first playoff event. Additionally, a "wild card" playoff berth will be awarded to a golfer who finishes in the top 10 of the last regular-season event, the SAS Championship, and is not within the top 72 after the tournament. (If more than one player outside the top 72 finishes in the top 10 at the SAS Championship, the highest finisher among these players will qualify.)
- During the first two playoff events, points are earned as in the regular season, except the winner earns double points. The playoff field is cut to 54 after the first playoff event and 36 after the second, with the survivors advancing to the Charles Schwab Cup Championship.
- Prior to the Charles Schwab Cup Championship, the points totals are reset. All 36 qualifiers will have a theoretical chance to win the Charles Schwab Cup, and each golfer in the top five can win the Charles Schwab Cup by winning the final event, no matter how the rest of the field performs.

The top five win annuities. Annuities involved in ties are divided amongst the tied players.

=== Winners ===
| Season | Winner | Points |
|---|---|---|
| 2026 | (United States) Stewart Cink (2) | 4,999,830 |
| 2025 | (United States) Stewart Cink | 3,968,040 |
| 2024 | (New Zealand) Steven Alker (2) | 2,781,203 |
| 2023 | (United States) Steve Stricker | 3,986,063 |
| 2022 | (New Zealand) Steven Alker | 4,173,435 |
| 2020–21 | (Germany) Bernhard Langer (6) | 3,655,999 |
| 2019 | (United States) Scott McCarron | 2,534,090 |
| 2018 | (Germany) Bernhard Langer (5) | 2,525,404 |
| 2017 | (United States) Kevin Sutherland | 3,280 |
| 2016 | (Germany) Bernhard Langer (4) | 3,200 |
| 2015 | (Germany) Bernhard Langer (3) | 3,520 |
| 2014 | (Germany) Bernhard Langer (2) | 4,152 |
| 2013 | (United States) Kenny Perry | 3,273 |
| 2012 | (United States) Tom Lehman (2) | 3,082 |
| 2011 | (United States) Tom Lehman | 2,422 |
| 2010 | (Germany) Bernhard Langer | 3,597 |
| 2009 | (United States) Loren Roberts (2) | 2,670 |
| 2008 | (United States) Jay Haas (2) | 2,556 |
| 2007 | (United States) Loren Roberts | 2,716 |
| 2006 | (United States) Jay Haas | 3,053 |
| 2005 | (United States) Tom Watson (2) | 2,980 |
| 2004 | (United States) Hale Irwin (2) | 3,427 |
| 2003 | (United States) Tom Watson | 4,370 |
| 2002 | (United States) Hale Irwin | 2,886 |
| 2001 | (United States) Allen Doyle | 2,382 |

== Player and rookie of the year awards ==
| Season | Player of the Year | Rookie of the Year | Comeback Player of the Year |
|---|---|---|---|
| 2025 | (United States) Stewart Cink | (United States) Tommy Gainey | No award |
| 2024 | (New Zealand) Steven Alker (2) | (Argentina) Ricardo González | No award |
| 2023 | (United States) Steve Stricker | No award | No award |
| 2022 | (New Zealand) Steven Alker | (Republic of Ireland) Pádraig Harrington | No award |
| 2020–21 | (Germany) Bernhard Langer (9) | (United States) Jim Furyk | No award |
| 2019 | (United States) Scott McCarron | (South Africa) Retief Goosen | No award |
| 2018 | (Germany) Bernhard Langer (8) | (United States) Ken Tanigawa | No award |
| 2017 | (Germany) Bernhard Langer (7) | (United States) Jerry Kelly | No award |
| 2016 | (Germany) Bernhard Langer (6) | (England) Paul Broadhurst | No award |
| 2015 | (Germany) Bernhard Langer (5) | (United States) Jerry Smith | No award |
| 2014 | (Germany) Bernhard Langer (4) | (United States) Scott Dunlap | No award |
| 2013 | (United States) Kenny Perry | (United States) Rocco Mediate | No award |
| 2012 | (United States) Tom Lehman (2) | (United States) Kirk Triplett | No award |
| 2011 | (United States) Tom Lehman | (United States) Kenny Perry | (United States) Chip Beck |
| 2010 | (Germany) Bernhard Langer (3) | (United States) Fred Couples | (United States) Ken Green |
| 2009 | (Germany) Bernhard Langer (2) | (United States) Russ Cochran | No award |
| 2008 | (Germany) Bernhard Langer | (Germany) Bernhard Langer | No award |
| 2007 | (United States) Jay Haas (2) | (Zimbabwe) Denis Watson | (United States) R. W. Eaks |
| 2006 | (United States) Jay Haas | (Argentina) Eduardo Romero | (United States) Tim Simpson |
| 2005 | (United States) Dana Quigley | (United States) Jay Haas | (United States) Peter Jacobsen |
| 2004 | (United States) Craig Stadler | (Republic of Ireland) Mark McNulty | (United States) Hubert Green (2) |
| 2003 | (United States) Tom Watson | (United States) Craig Stadler | (United States) Don Pooley |
| 2002 | (United States) Hale Irwin | (United States) Morris Hatalsky | (United States) Hubert Green |
| 2001 | (United States) Allen Doyle | (United States) Bob Gilder | (United States) John Schroeder |
| 2000 | (United States) Larry Nelson | (United States) Doug Tewell | (United States) Raymond Floyd |
| 1999 | (United States) Bruce Fleisher | (United States) Bruce Fleisher | (United States) Tom Jenkins |
| 1998 | (United States) Hale Irwin (2) | (United States) Joe Inman | (United States) Jim Colbert |
| 1997 | (United States) Hale Irwin | (United States) Gil Morgan | (United States) George Archer |
| 1996 | (United States) Jim Colbert (2) | (South Africa) John Bland | (United States) Al Geiberger |
| 1995 | (United States) Jim Colbert | (United States) Hale Irwin | (United States) Walter Morgan |
| 1994 | (United States) Lee Trevino (3) | (United States) Jay Sigel | (United States) Dave Eichelberger |
| 1993 | (United States) Dave Stockton | (United States) Bob Murphy | (United States) Jim Ferree |
| 1992 | (United States) Lee Trevino (2) | (United States) Dave Stockton | (United States) Tommy Aaron |
| 1991 | (United States) George Archer and (United States) Mike Hill (shared) | (United States) Jim Colbert | (United States) Larry Laoretti |
| 1990 | (United States) Lee Trevino | (United States) Lee Trevino | No award |

== Byron Nelson Award ==
| Season | Winner | Scoring Average |
|---|---|---|
| 2026 | (United States) Zach Johnson | 67.49 |
| 2025 | (New Zealand) Steven Alker (3) | 68.42 |
| 2024 | (New Zealand) Steven Alker (2) | 68.52 |
| 2023 | (United States) Steve Stricker | 67.54 |
| 2022 | (New Zealand) Steven Alker | 68.27 |
| 2020–21 | (United States) Jim Furyk | 68.84 |
| 2019 | (South Africa) Retief Goosen | 69.14 |
| 2018 | (Germany) Bernhard Langer (7) | 69.01 |
| 2017 | (Germany) Bernhard Langer (6) | 68.03 |
| 2016 | (Germany) Bernhard Langer (5) | 68.31 |
| 2015 | (Germany) Bernhard Langer (4) | 68.69 |
| 2014 | (Germany) Bernhard Langer (3) | 68.03 |
| 2013 | (United States) Fred Couples (3) | 68.64 |
| 2012 | (United States) Fred Couples (2) | 68.52 |
| 2011 | (United States) Mark Calcavecchia | 69.04 |
| 2010 | (United States) Fred Couples | 67.96 |
| 2009 | (Germany) Bernhard Langer (2) | 68.92 |
| 2008 | (Germany) Bernhard Langer | 69.65 |
| 2007 | (United States) Loren Roberts (2) | 69.31 |
| 2006 | (United States) Loren Roberts | 69.01 |
| 2005 | (Republic of Ireland) Mark McNulty | 69.41 |
| 2004 | (United States) Craig Stadler | 69.30 |
| 2003 | (United States) Tom Watson | 68.81 |
| 2002 | (United States) Hale Irwin (4) | 68.93 |
| 2001 | (United States) Gil Morgan (2) | 69.20 |
| 2000 | (United States) Gil Morgan | 68.83 |
| 1999 | (United States) Bruce Fleisher | 69.19 |
| 1998 | (United States) Hale Irwin (3) | 68.59 |
| 1997 | (United States) Hale Irwin (2) | 68.92 |
| 1996 | (United States) Hale Irwin | 69.47 |
| 1995 | (United States) Raymond Floyd (2) | 69.47 |
| 1994 | (United States) Raymond Floyd | 69.08 |
| 1993 | (New Zealand) Bob Charles (3) | 69.59 |
| 1992 | (United States) Lee Trevino (3) | 69.46 |
| 1991 | (United States) Lee Trevino (2) | 69.50 |
| 1990 | (United States) Lee Trevino | 68.89 |
| 1989 | (New Zealand) Bob Charles (2) | 69.78 |
| 1988 | (New Zealand) Bob Charles | 70.05 |
| 1987 | (United States) Chi-Chi Rodríguez (2) | 70.07 |
| 1986 | (United States) Chi-Chi Rodríguez | 69.65 |
| 1985 | (United States) Don January (5) | 70.11 |
| 1984 | (United States) Don January (4) | 70.68 |
| 1983 | (United States) Don January (3) | 69.46 |
| 1982 | (United States) Don January (2) | 70.03 |
| 1981 | (United States) Miller Barber | 69.57 |
| 1980 | (United States) Don January | 71.00 |
