= Jay Haas =

American professional golfer

Personal information
- Full name: Jay Dean Haas
- Nickname: Jaybird
- Nationality: United States
- Born: December 2, 1953 (age 72) St. Louis, Missouri, U.S.
- Height: 5 ft 11 in (1.80 m)
- Weight: 185 lb (84 kg; 13.2 st)
- Spouse: Jan Pruitt
- Children: 2, including Bill

Career
- Sport: Golf
- College: Wake Forest University
- Turned professional: 1976
- Current tour: PGA Tour Champions
- Former tour: PGA Tour
- Professional wins: 33
- Highest ranking: 17 (September 14, 2003)

Number of wins by tour
- PGA Tour: 9
- PGA Tour Champions: 18
- Other: 6

Best results in major championships
- Masters Tournament: T3: 1995
- PGA Championship: T3: 1999
- U.S. Open: T4: 1995
- The Open Championship: T19: 1983

Achievements and awards
- Haskins Award: 1975
- Payne Stewart Award: 2004
- Champions Tour Rookie of the Year: 2005
- Bob Jones Award: 2006
- Champions Tour Charles Schwab Cup winner: 2006, 2008
- Champions Tour money list winner: 2006, 2007
- Champions Tour Player of the Year: 2006, 2007

Jay Dean Haas (born December 2, 1953) is an American professional golfer formerly of the PGA Tour who now plays on the PGA Tour Champions.

== Early life and amateur career ==
Haas was born in St. Louis, Missouri, and grew up in Belleville, Illinois. He attended Wake Forest University and was a member of the NCAA Championship team of the middle 1970s with Curtis Strange and Bob Byman that Golf World has called "the greatest college team of all time". He won the individual championship in 1975.

== Professional career ==
In 1976, Haas turned professional. He had a solid career on the PGA Tour winning nine times between 1978 and 1993. He had a resurgence in 2003, when he finished in the top 30 on the money list for the first time since 1995 and made the United States Presidents Cup team. The following year he was one of Hal Sutton's two captain's picks for the Ryder Cup and, at age 50, made his third appearance in that event.

Haas was known for being one of the most consistent players on the PGA Tour over the course of his career and ended up playing 799 events. He is only four starts off Mark Brooks' record. He has made the cut 593 times on the PGA Tour, more than any other player. Haas has the distinction of playing in 87 majors without a win, a record until 2021.

Haas was eligible to play in Champions Tour events from the start of the 2004 season and he lost to Hale Irwin by one stroke at the Senior PGA Championship in his first appearance at that level. He was still featured in the top 20 of the Official World Golf Ranking after his 50th birthday. In 2005, he won twice on the Champions Tour, while also continuing to play regularly on the PGA Tour. In April 2006, he won back to back events on the Champions Tour and the following month he won a playoff at the Oak Tree Golf Club with Brad Bryant at the Senior PGA Championship to claim his first senior major and he went on to top the 2006 Champions Tour money list. He was named the Champions Tour Player of the Year in 2006 as well. Haas won the 2008 Charles Schwab Cup to win two out of the last three cups.

After winning the Greater Hickory Classic at Rock Barn in September 2009, Haas won his third senior major and 14th Champions Tour event in October at the Constellation Energy Senior Players Championship. He came from 5 strokes behind with a final-round 6-under-par 64 to win by 1 over 54-hole leader Tom Watson. In June 2012, Haas won his 16th title on the Champions Tour, cruising to a five-stroke victory over Larry Mize and Kirk Triplett at the Principal Charity Classic. In October 2016, Haas won the Toshiba Classic in a playoff with Bart Bryant. He became the second-oldest player to win a PGA Tour Champions event at age 62 years, 312 days; the oldest being then Mike Fetchick at 63 years.

At the 2022 Zurich Classic, at the age of 68, he teamed up with his son Bill and became the oldest golfer ever to make the cut.

== Personal life ==
Haas comes from a distinguished family of golfers. He is a nephew of 1968 Masters winner Bob Goalby, and has several other relations in golf including his second son Bill who has played on the PGA Tour since 2006. His oldest son Jay Jr., brother Jerry Haas, and brother-in-law Dillard Pruitt also played on the PGA Tour.

Haas resides in Greenville, South Carolina.

== Awards and honors ==
- In 1975, Haas earned the Haskins Award, bestowed to the top college golfer in the United States.
- In 2005, Haas was the Champions Tour Rookie of the Year.
- In February 2005, he received the Payne Stewart Award,
- In April 2005, he received the Jim Murray Award for his cooperation with the media.
- Haas was voted the 2006 Bob Jones Award, the highest honor given by the United States Golf Association in recognition of distinguished sportsmanship in golf.

== Professional wins (33) ==
=== PGA Tour wins (9) ===
No.	Date	Tournament	Winning score	Margin of victory	Runner(s)-up
1	Jan 29, 1978	Andy Williams-San Diego Open Invitational	−10 (72-64-72-70=278)	3 strokes	(United States) Andy Bean, (United States) Gene Littler, (United States) John Schroeder
2	Jul 12, 1981	Greater Milwaukee Open	−14 (68-66-67-73=274)	3 strokes	(United States) Chi-Chi Rodríguez
3	Sep 6, 1981	B.C. Open	−14 (67-65-69-69=270)	3 strokes	(United States) Tom Kite
4	Sep 19, 1982	Hall of Fame	−8 (70-70-70-66=276)	Playoff	(United States) John Adams
5	Oct 3, 1982	Texas Open	−18 (63-67-67-65=262)	3 strokes	(United States) Curtis Strange
6	Apr 26, 1987	Big "I" Houston Open	−12 (69-69-71-67=276)	Playoff	(United States) Buddy Gardner
7	Jan 24, 1988	Bob Hope Chrysler Classic	−22 (63-68-69-68-70=338)	2 strokes	(United States) David Edwards
8	Jun 14, 1992	Federal Express St. Jude Classic	−21 (68-67-64-64=263)	3 strokes	(United States) Dan Forsman, (United States) Robert Gamez
9	Oct 17, 1993	H.E.B. Texas Open (2)	−21 (68-65-66-64=263)	Playoff	(United States) Bob Lohr

PGA Tour playoff record (3–0)

No.	Year	Tournament	Opponent	Result
1	1982	Hall of Fame	(United States) John Adams	Won with par on second extra hole
2	1987	Big "I" Houston Open	(United States) Buddy Gardner	Won with par on first extra hole
3	1993	H.E.B. Texas Open	(United States) Bob Lohr	Won with birdie on second extra hole

=== Other wins (6) ===
- 1976 Missouri Open
- 1982 Spalding Invitational
- 1991 Mexican Open
- 1996 Franklin Templeton Shark Shootout (with Tom Kite)
- 2004 CVS Charity Classic (with son Bill Haas)
- 2012 CVS Caremark Charity Classic (with Morgan Pressel)

=== PGA Tour Champions wins (18) ===
Legend
PGA Tour Champions major championships (3)
Other PGA Tour Champions (15)

No.	Date	Tournament	Winning score	Margin of victory	Runner(s)-up
1	Oct 9, 2005	Greater Hickory Classic at Rock Barn	−16 (68-67-65=200)	2 strokes	(United States) Dana Quigley
2	Oct 23, 2005	SBC Championship	−14 (67-66-66=199)	2 strokes	(United States) Tom Purtzer
3	Apr 23, 2006	Liberty Mutual Legends of Golf	−15 (66-68-67=201)	5 strokes	(United States) Peter Jacobsen, (United States) Craig Stadler
4	Apr 30, 2006	FedEx Kinko's Classic	−11 (68-72-65=205)	2 strokes	(England) Mark James, (United States) Tom Kite
5	May 28, 2006	Senior PGA Championship	−5 (68-70-73-68=279)	Playoff	(United States) Brad Bryant
6	Oct 15, 2006	Administaff Small Business Classic	−17 (65-63-71=199)	5 strokes	(United States) Bruce Lietzke
7	Mar 11, 2007	Toshiba Classic	−19 (65-64-65=194)	2 strokes	(United States) R. W. Eaks
8	Apr 22, 2007	Liberty Mutual Legends of Golf (2)	−9 (68-69-70=207)	Playoff	(United States) Tom Kite
9	Jun 10, 2007	Principal Charity Classic	−12 (65-67-69=201)	3 strokes	(United States) Brad Bryant, (United States) R. W. Eaks
10	Jun 24, 2007	Bank of America Championship	−13 (71-66-66=203)	3 strokes	(United States) Brad Bryant, (United States) Leonard Thompson
11	May 25, 2008	Senior PGA Championship (2)	+7 (69-72-72-74=287)	1 stroke	(Germany) Bernhard Langer
12	Jun 1, 2008	Principal Charity Classic (2)	−10 (70-68-65=203)	1 stroke	(United States) Andy Bean
13	Sep 20, 2009	Greater Hickory Classic at Rock Barn (2)	−18 (62-71-65=198)	2 strokes	(United States) Andy Bean, (United States) Russ Cochran
14	Oct 4, 2009	Constellation Energy Senior Players Championship	−13 (66-70-67-64=267)	1 stroke	(United States) Tom Watson
15	Aug 7, 2011	3M Championship	−15 (64-69-68=201)	1 stroke	(United States) Tom Lehman, (United States) Kenny Perry, (Australia) Peter Senior
16	Jun 3, 2012	Principal Charity Classic (3)	−16 (66-65-66=197)	5 strokes	(United States) Larry Mize, (United States) Kirk Triplett
17	Oct 19, 2014	Greater Hickory Kia Classic at Rock Barn (3)	−17 (63-67-66=196)	2 strokes	(United States) Joe Durant, (United States) Kirk Triplett
18	Oct 9, 2016	Toshiba Classic (2)	−16 (64-63-70=197)	Playoff	(United States) Bart Bryant

PGA Tour Champions playoff record (3–2)

No.	Year	Tournament	Opponent	Result
1	2006	Senior PGA Championship	(United States) Brad Bryant	Won with par on third extra hole
2	2007	Liberty Mutual Legends of Golf	(United States) Tom Kite	Won with par on first extra hole
3	2008	Toshiba Classic	(Germany) Bernhard Langer	Lost to birdie on seventh extra hole
4	2014	Charles Schwab Cup Championship	(United States) Tom Pernice Jr.	Lost to birdie on fourth extra hole
5	2016	Toshiba Classic	(United States) Bart Bryant	Won with birdie on first extra hole

== Results in major championships ==
Tournament	1974	1975	1976	1977	1978	1979
Masters Tournament			CUT		T47	
U.S. Open	T54LA	T18LA		T5	CUT	
The Open Championship						
PGA Championship					T58	T7

Tournament	1980	1981	1982	1983	1984	1985	1986	1987	1988	1989
Masters Tournament	T17	T31	44	T27	T21	5	T6	T7	CUT	T46
U.S. Open	T26	CUT	T6	T43	T11	T15	CUT		T25	CUT
The Open Championship			T27	T19	T36			T35	T38	
PGA Championship	T50	T19	T5	T9	T39	T38	T53	T28	T38	CUT

Tournament	1990	1991	1992	1993	1994	1995	1996	1997	1998	1999
Masters Tournament				38	T5	T3	T36		T12	T44
U.S. Open	CUT		T23	T77	CUT	T4	T90	T5	CUT	T17
The Open Championship						T79	T22	T24		
PGA Championship	CUT		T62	T20	14	T8	T31	T61	T40	T3

Tournament	2000	2001	2002	2003	2004	2005	2006	2007	2008
Masters Tournament	T37			CUT	T17	48			
U.S. Open			T12	CUT	T9	CUT	T37		
The Open Championship				CUT	CUT				
PGA Championship	T64		CUT	T5	T37	CUT	T68		CUT

Top 10
Did not play

LA = Low amateur
CUT = missed the half-way cut
"T" indicates a tie for a place

=== Summary ===
Tournament	Wins	2nd	3rd	Top-5	Top-10	Top-25	Events	Cuts made
Masters Tournament	0	0	1	3	5	9	22	19
U.S. Open	0	0	0	3	5	12	27	18
The Open Championship	0	0	0	0	0	3	10	8
PGA Championship	0	0	1	3	6	9	28	23
Totals	0	0	2	9	16	33	87	68

- Most consecutive cuts made – 17 (1981 PGA – 1986 Masters)
- Longest streak of top-10s – 2 (1995 Masters – 1995 U.S. Open)

== Results in The Players Championship ==
Tournament	1977	1978	1979
The Players Championship	CUT	T57	T9

Tournament	1980	1981	1982	1983	1984	1985	1986	1987	1988	1989
The Players Championship	T8	T29	T27	WD	T29	T55	T7	T50	DQ	CUT

Tournament	1990	1991	1992	1993	1994	1995	1996	1997	1998	1999
The Players Championship	CUT	CUT	CUT	T20	T55	CUT	T8	T43	CUT	CUT

Tournament	2000	2001	2002	2003	2004	2005	2006	2007	2008	2009	2010
The Players Championship	CUT		T49	T2	T6	T24					CUT

Top 10
Did not play

CUT = missed the halfway cut
WD = withdrew
DQ = disqualified
"T" indicates a tie for a place

== Results in World Golf Championships ==
Tournament	2003	2004	2005
Match Play	QF	R64	R16
Championship	T54	T43	
Invitational	T17	T41	T19

Top 10
Did not play

QF, R16, R32, R64 = Round in which player lost in match play
"T" = Tied

== Senior major championships ==
=== Wins (3) ===
Year	Championship	Winning score	Margin	Runner-up
2006	Senior PGA Championship	−5 (68-70-73-68=279)	Playoff	(United States) Brad Bryant
2008	Senior PGA Championship (2)	+7 (69-72-72-74=287)	1 stroke	(Germany) Bernhard Langer
2009	Constellation Energy Senior Players Championship	−13 (66-70-67-64=267)	1 stroke	(United States) Tom Watson

=== Results timeline ===
Results not in chronological order

Tournament	2004	2005	2006	2007	2008	2009	2010	2011	2012	2013	2014	2015	2016	2017	2018	2019	2020	2021	2022	2023	2024	2025	2026
Senior PGA Championship	2	CUT	1	T9	1	T9	T23	T34	T29	T2	T3	T50		T38	CUT	T63	NT	75	T64		CUT	CUT	
The Tradition		T23	T20	T14	T3	T17	T10	T5	T13	T31	T3		T52	T54	63		NT						
U.S. Senior Open	T3	T22	T8	T5	T9	T13	T20	T13	T9	T35		T38	T14	T42	T14	T17	NT	T40	T7		T22		CUT
Senior Players Championship		T18	T3	T17	6	1	T20	T32	T20	T27	T6		T54	T14	T32	T2	27	T52	64				
Senior British Open Championship			T6	T4		T19	T8	T28	T40								NT						

Win
Top 10
Did not play

CUT = missed the halfway cut
"T" indicates a tie for a place
NT = no tournament due to COVID-19 pandemic

== U.S. national team appearances ==
Amateur

- Walker Cup: 1975 (winners)

Professional

- Ryder Cup: 1983 (winners), 1995, 2004
- Presidents Cup: 1994 (winners), 2003 (tie), 2015 (non-playing captain)
- UBS Cup: 2004 (winners)
- Wendy's 3-Tour Challenge (representing Champions Tour): 2004 (PGA Tour), 2005 (winners), 2006, 2007, 2008 (winners), 2009, 2011 (winners)

== See also ==
- Fall 1976 PGA Tour Qualifying School graduates
- List of golfers with most PGA Tour Champions wins
