= Puerto Vallarta Blue Agave Golf Classic =

The Puerto Vallarta Blue Agave Golf Classic was a Champions Tour golf tournament played only in 2006. It was played at the Vista Vallarta Club de Golf in the resort of Puerto Vallarta, Mexico over a course which was designed by Jack Nicklaus. It was the only Champions Tour event in Mexico in 2006, and was the richest golf tournament of any kind to be staged in that country. A richer PGA Tour event called the Mayakoba Golf Classic at Riviera Maya-Cancun debuted in 2007. Morris Hatalsky won the tournament, taking the winner's US$240,000 share of the $1,600,000 purse.
