= AT&T Champions Classic =

Coordinates: 34.419°N 118.578°W

Tournament information
- Location: Valencia, Santa Clarita, California, U.S.
- Established: 1990
- Course: Valencia Country Club
- Par: 72
- Length: 6,959 yards (6,363 m)
- Tour: Champions Tour
- Format: Stroke play - 54 holes
- Prize fund: $1.6 million
- Month played: March
- Final year: 2009

Final champion
- (United States) Dan Forsman

Location in the United States
Location in California
Locations in L.A. metro area

The AT&T Champions Classic was a professional golf tournament on the Champions Tour in southern California from 1990 to 2009. A mid-autumn event through 2000, it was moved to late winter in 2001. AT&T was the main sponsor of the tournament for its final editions, held at Valencia Country Club in Santa Clarita, California.

The tournament was founded in November 1990 as the "Security Pacific Senior Classic" at Rancho Park Golf Club, a municipal course in the city of Los Angeles, where it was played through 1994. Rancho Park hosted the Los Angeles Open on the PGA Tour from 1956 through 1972 (except 1968). The purse for the inaugural event was $500,000 with a winner's share of $75,000. From 1995 through 2000, it was played at Wilshire Country Club, then moved north to Valencia in March 2001.

The purse in 2009 was $1.6 million, with a winner's share of $240,000 to playoff winner Dan Forsman, his first victory on the senior tour.

== Tournament sites ==
Years	No.	Venue	City
2001–2009	9	Valencia Country Club	Santa Clarita, California
1995–2000	6	Wilshire Country Club	Los Angeles, California
1990–1994	5	Rancho Park Golf Course	Los Angeles, California

== Winners ==
AT&T Champions Classic

- 2009 Dan Forsman
- 2008 Denis Watson
- 2007 Tom Purtzer (2)

AT&T Classic

- 2006 Tom Kite (2)

SBC Classic

- 2005 Des Smyth
- 2004 Gil Morgan (3)
- 2003 Tom Purtzer (1)

SBC Senior Classic

- 2002 Tom Kite (1)
- 2001 Jim Colbert
- 2000 Joe Inman (3)

Pacific Bell Senior Classic

- 1999 Joe Inman (2)
- 1998 Joe Inman (1)

Ralphs Senior Classic

- 1997 Gil Morgan (2)
- 1996 Gil Morgan (1)
- 1995 John Bland
- 1994 Jack Kiefer
- 1993 Dale Douglass
- 1992 Raymond Floyd

Security Pacific Senior Classic

- 1991 John Brodie
- 1990 Mike Hill
