= R. W. Eaks =

American professional golfer

Personal information
- Full name: Robert W. Eaks
- Nationality: United States
- Born: May 22, 1952 (age 74) Colorado Springs, Colorado, U.S.
- Height: 6 ft 0 in (1.83 m)
- Weight: 200 lb (91 kg; 14 st)

Career
- Sport: Golf
- College: University of Northern Colorado
- Turned professional: 1976
- Former tours: PGA Tour; Nationwide Tour; Champions Tour
- Professional wins: 10

Number of wins by tour
- Korn Ferry Tour: 3
- PGA Tour Champions: 4
- Other: 3

Best results in major championships
- Masters Tournament: DNP
- PGA Championship: DNP
- U.S. Open: CUT: 1986, 1990
- The Open Championship: DNP

Achievements and awards
- Champions Tour Comeback Player of the Year: 2007

Robert W. Eaks (born May 22, 1952) is an American professional golfer who played on the PGA Tour and on the Champions Tour.

== Early life and amateur career ==
Eaks was born in Colorado Springs, Colorado. He attended Billy Mitchell High School, where he was a decorated athlete in basketball and golf, and graduated in 1971. His high school home course was Patty Jewett GC where he also worked on the grounds crew. He attended college at the University of Northern Colorado where he played basketball.

== Professional career ==
In 1976, Eaks turned professional. In the 1990s, he played primarily on the PGA Tour's developmental tour where he earned three victories. He was a member of the tour from 1990–1997 and 1999–2001. He also was a member of the PGA Tour in 1998 and 1999 but was not very successful. He entered 50 events and only made 17 cuts. His best finish on the PGA Tour was tied for 7th at the United Airlines Hawaiian Open in 1998.

Eaks became eligible to play on the Champions Tour in 2002 and has been a member since then. He had a very successful 2007 season. He won the Dick's Sporting Goods Open in July and the Greater Hickory Classic at Rock Barn in September. He had 11 top-10s including four runners-up. Eaks participated in the largest playoff in a PGA Tour-sanctioned tournament at the Boeing Greater Seattle Classic. Denis Watson emerged victorious from the 7-man playoff. He finished sixth on the 2007 season Champions Tour money list.

== Awards and honors ==
In 2007, Eaks won the Champions Tour's Comeback Player of the Year award.

== Professional wins (10) ==
=== Nike Tour wins (3) ===
No.	Date	Tournament	Winning score	Margin of victory	Runner(s)-up
1	Jun 3, 1990	Ben Hogan Quicksilver Open	−4 (72-68-72=212)	2 strokes	(United States) Brandel Chamblee, (United States) Ed Humenik, (United States) Dick Mast
2	Mar 21, 1993	Nike Louisiana Open	−15 (67-63-72-71=273)	2 strokes	(United States) Karl Kimball
3	Sep 14, 1997	Nike San Jose Open	−16 (68-66-71-67=272)	2 strokes	(United States) Mark Carnevale, (United States) Chris DiMarco, (United States) Steve Lamontagne, (United States) J. L. Lewis, (Malaysia) Iain Steel

Nike Tour playoff record (0–1)

No.	Year	Tournament	Opponent	Result
1	1996	Nike Ozarks Open	(United States) Stewart Cink	Lost to birdie on third extra hole

=== Other wins (3) ===
- 1990 Arizona Open
- 1995 Taco Bell Newport Classic
- 1996 Taco Bell Newport Classic

=== Champions Tour wins (4) ===
No.	Date	Tournament	Winning score	Margin of victory	Runner(s)-up
1	Jul 15, 2007	Dick's Sporting Goods Open	−17 (71-62-66=199)	3 strokes	(United States) Bruce Vaughan
2	Sep 16, 2007	Greater Hickory Classic at Rock Barn	−17 (63-66-70=199)	2 strokes	(United States) Jay Haas, (Canada) Rod Spittle
3	Jul 20, 2008	3M Championship	−23 (65-63-65=193)	6 strokes	(United States) Gary Hallberg, (Germany) Bernhard Langer
4	Sep 14, 2008	Greater Hickory Classic at Rock Barn (2)	−16 (61-68-71=200)	4 strokes	(United States) Tom Kite, (United States) Tom Jenkins

Champions Tour playoff record (0–3)

No.	Year	Tournament	Opponent	Result
1	2006	Greater Hickory Classic at Rock Barn	(United States) Andy Bean	Lost to birdie on first extra hole
2	2007	Regions Charity Classic	(United States) Brad Bryant	Lost to birdie on third extra hole
3	2007	Boeing Classic	(United States) David Eger, (United States) Gil Morgan, (Japan) Naomichi Ozaki, (United States) Dana Quigley, (United States) Craig Stadler, (Zimbabwe) Denis Watson	Watson won with eagle on second extra hole Eger, Morgan, Ozaki and Quigley eliminated by birdie on first hole

== Results in major championships ==
Tournament	1986	1987	1988	1989	1990
U.S. Open	CUT				CUT

Did not play

CUT = missed the half-way cut
Note: Eaks only played in the U.S. Open.

== See also ==
- Spring 1980 PGA Tour Qualifying School graduates
- 1997 Nike Tour graduates
