= Greater Hickory Kia Classic at Rock Barn =

Greater Hickory Kia Classic
Tournament information
- Location: Conover, North Carolina, U.S.
- Established: 2003
- Course(s): Rock Barn G&S
- Par: 72
- Length: 6,957 yards (6,361 m)
- Tour(s): Champions Tour
- Format: Stroke play - 54 holes
- Prize fund: $1,600,000
- Month played: October
- Final year: 2014

Final champion
- (United States) Jay Haas

The Greater Hickory Kia Classic at Rock Barn was a golf tournament on the Champions Tour. It was played annually in June in Conover, North Carolina at the Rock Barn Golf & Spa.

The purse for the 2014 tournament was US$1,600,000, with $240,000 going to the winner, Jay Haas. The tournament was founded in 2003.

== Winners ==
Greater Hickory Kia Classic at Rock Barn

- 2014 Jay Haas
- 2013 Michael Allen

Greater Hickory Classic at Rock Barn

- 2012 Fred Funk
- 2011 Mark Wiebe

Ensure Classic at Rock Barn

- 2010 Gary Hallberg

Greater Hickory Classic at Rock Barn

- 2009 Jay Haas
- 2008 R. W. Eaks
- 2007 R. W. Eaks
- 2006 Andy Bean
- 2005 Jay Haas
- 2004 Doug Tewell
- 2003 Craig Stadler
