= Sunriver (disambiguation) =

Sunriver may refer to:

- Sunriver (2003–2009), an American Thoroughbred racehorse
- Sunriver, Oregon, a private resort community in Oregon
- Sunriver Observatory, an observatory located in Sunriver, Oregon
- Sunriver Resort, a luxury resort in Oregon

== See also ==
- Sun River, a tributary of the Missouri River in the Montana
