= Fred Meyer Challenge =

Tournament information
- Location: Portland metropolitan area
- Established: 1986
- Course(s): Portland Golf Club (1986–91); The Oregon Golf Club (1992–97); The Reserve (1998–2002)
- Format: Best ball
- Prize fund: $180,000
- Final year: 2002

Final champion
- Brian Henninger and Scott McCarron

The Fred Meyer Challenge was a charity golf tournament played in the Portland metropolitan area in the U.S. state of Oregon. Held from 1986 to 2002, it was organized by Portland native and PGA Tour golfer Peter Jacobsen and sponsored by the then-locally owned hypermarket chain Fred Meyer. The field included active and retired PGA Tour players. It was always played as a two-man team best ball event. In its inaugural year, it was played as in a match play format, with four teams competing. For the rest of its tenure, it was played in a stroke play format, with 8 to 12 teams competing.

== History ==
From 1986 to 1997, the winning team split a $100,000 first prize. In 1998, this increased to $150,000 and in 2000 to $180,000. In the tournament's heyday, many high-profile golfers participated, and attendance neared 40,000 fans. After Fred Meyer was acquired by Kroger, it discontinued sponsorship of the event and the tournament was also discontinued.

=== Legacy ===
After the end of the Challenge, Jacobsen brought The Tradition, a PGA Tour Champions event, to Oregon starting in 2003. It was played at The Reserve from 2003-2006 before moving to the Crosswater Club in Sunriver, Oregon through 2010.

In 2011, Jacobsen's company Peter Jacobsen Sports revived the challenge-style exhibition tournament with the Umpqua Bank Challenge, which drew 15,000 to the Portland Golf Club for the 2011 tournament and 10,000 spectators to the 2012 edition at The Reserve. In October 2012, Jacobsen announced that the 2012 edition of the tournament may have been the last one, as both attendance and sponsorship had fallen short of expectations.

== Tournament hosts ==
Years	Venue	Location
1986–1991	Portland Golf Club	Portland, Oregon
1992–1997	The Oregon Golf Club	West Linn, Oregon
1998–2002	The Reserve Vineyards and Golf Club	Aloha, Oregon

== Winners ==
Year	Winners	Score	Ref
2002	Brian Henninger and Scott McCarron	122 (−22)	
2001	Billy Andrade and Brad Faxon	120 (−24)	
2000	John Cook and Mark O'Meara	125 (−19)	
1999	Billy Andrade and Brad Faxon	122 (−22)	
1998	David Duval and Jim Furyk	126 (−18)	
1997	Brad Faxon and Greg Norman	123 (−19)	
1996	Brad Faxon and Greg Norman	124 (−18)	
1995	Brad Faxon and Greg Norman	129 (−13)	
1994	John Cook and Mark O'Meara	125 (−17)	
1993	Steve Elkington and Tom Purtzer	126 (−16)	
1992	Billy Andrade and Tom Kite	128 (−16)	
1991	Paul Azinger and Ben Crenshaw	125 (−19)	
1990	Bobby Wadkins and Lanny Wadkins	122 (−22)	
1989	Joey Sindelar and Craig Stadler	125 (−19)	
1988	Paul Azinger and Bob Tway	125 (−19)	
1987	Isao Aoki and Payne Stewart	127 (−17)	
1986	Peter Jacobsen and Curtis Strange; Greg Norman and Gary Player	Tie	

== Multiple winners ==
=== As a team ===
- 3 wins
  - Brad Faxon and Greg Norman: 1995, 1996, 1997
- 2 wins
  - John Cook and Mark O'Meara: 1994, 2000
  - Billy Andrade and Brad Faxon: 1999, 2001

=== As an individual ===
- 5 wins
  - Brad Faxon: 1995, 1996, 1997, 1999, 2001
- 4 wins
  - Greg Norman: 1986, 1995, 1996, 1997
- 3 wins
  - Billy Andrade: 1992, 1999, 2001
- 2 wins
  - Paul Azinger: 1988, 1991
  - John Cook: 1994, 2000
  - Mark O'Meara: 1994, 2000
