= Sunriver Airport =

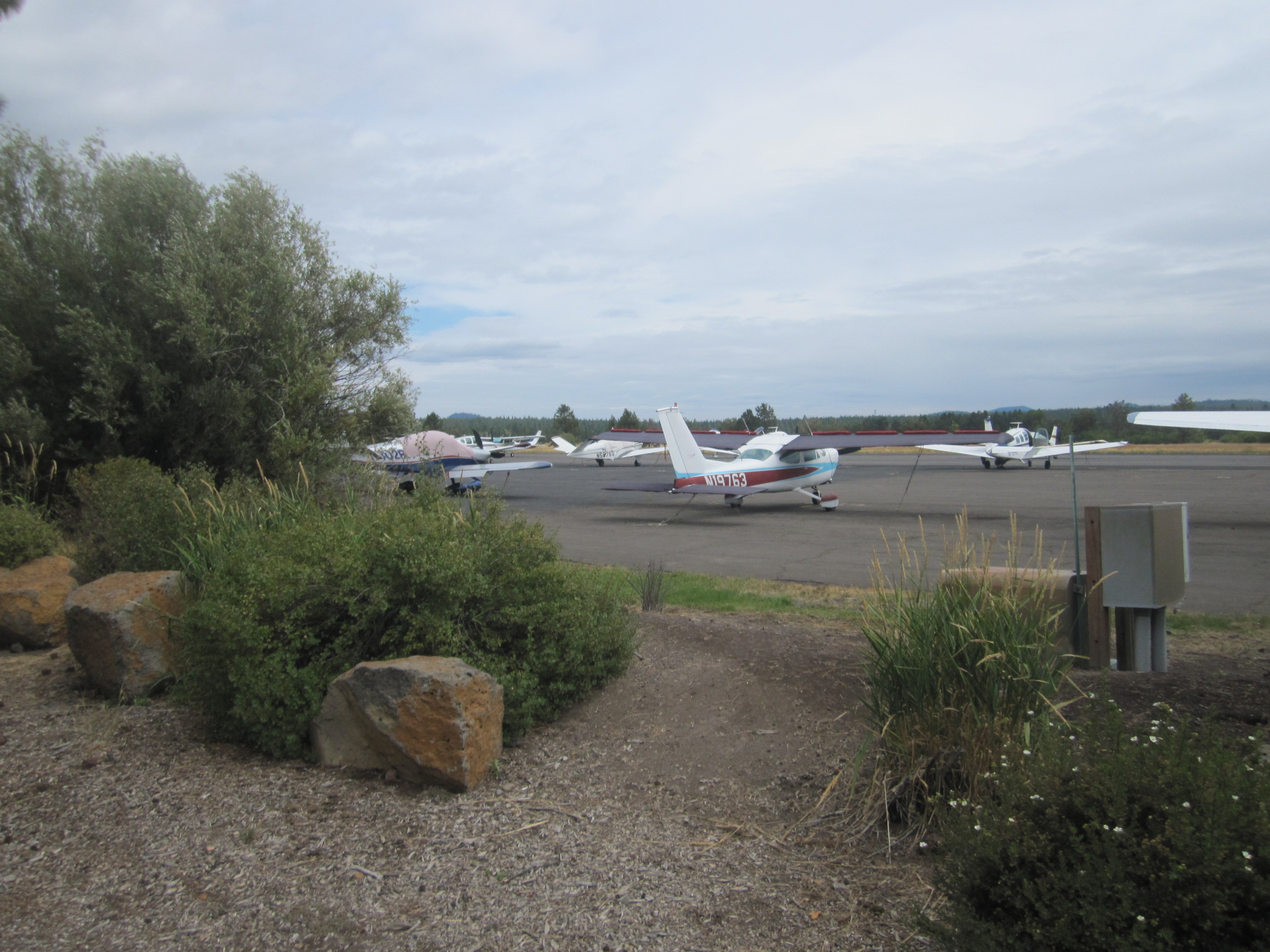
- IATA: SUO; ICAO: none; FAA LID: S21

Summary
- Airport type: Public use
- Owner: Sunriver Resort, L.P.
- Serves: Sunriver, Oregon
- Elevation AMSL: 4,164 ft / 1,269 m
- Coordinates: 43°52′35″N 121°27′11″W
- Website: sunriver-resort.com/...

Map
- Location of airport in Oregon

Runways
Direction	Length		Surface
Direction	ft	m	Surface
18/36	5,455	1,663	Asphalt

Statistics (2010)
- Aircraft operations: 6,150
- Based aircraft: 71
- Source: Federal Aviation Administration

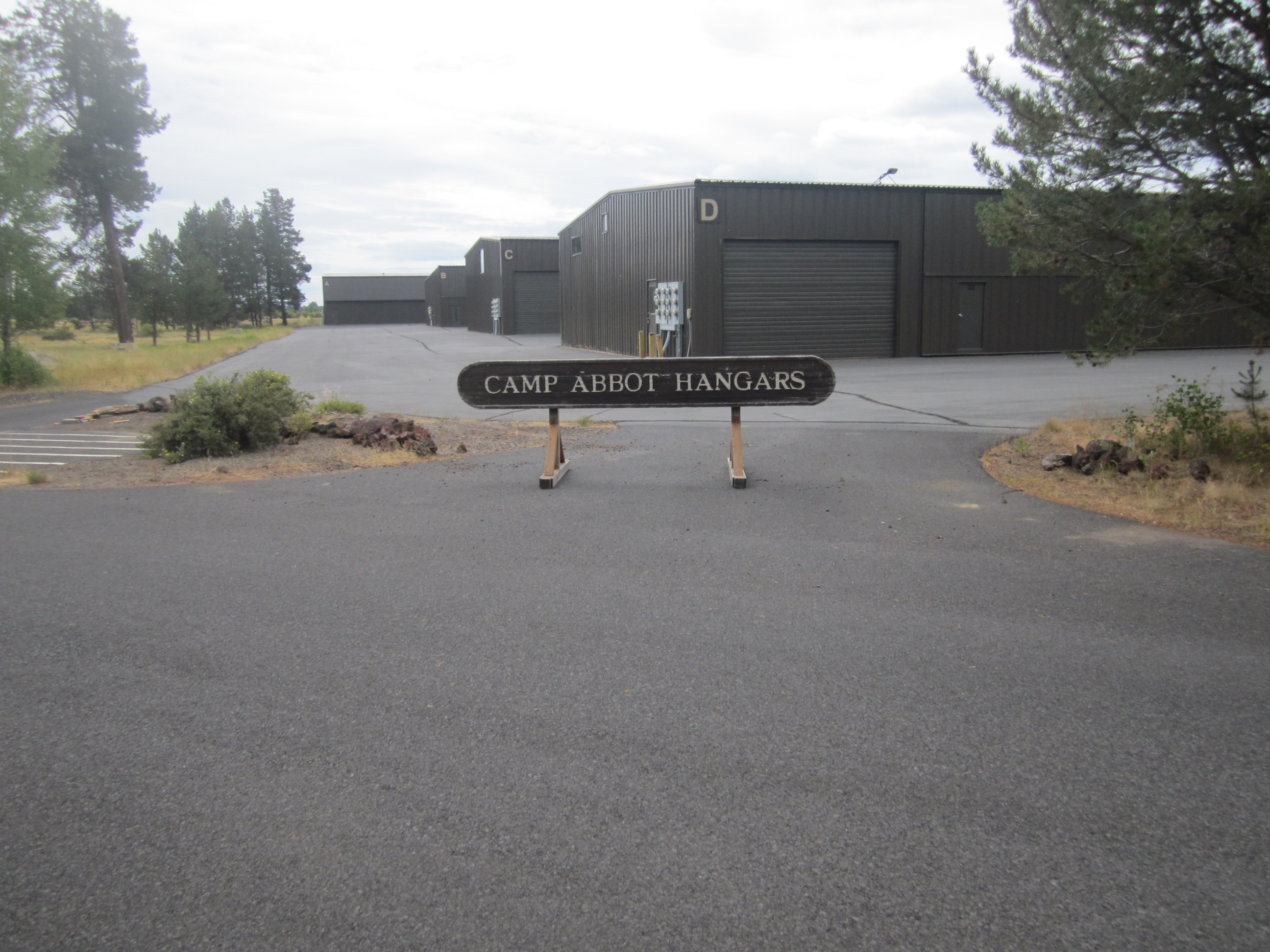
Camp Abbot Hangars at Sunriver Airport

Sunriver Airport (IATA: SUO, FAA LID: S21) is a public use airport located one nautical mile (2 km) west of the central business district of Sunriver, in Deschutes County, Oregon, United States. It is privately owned by Sunriver Resort, L.P. This airport is included in the National Plan of Integrated Airport Systems for 2011–2015, which categorized it as a general aviation facility.

It is used by travelers/private jets, glider tours around the area, and other uses to the public. It is located near the Sunriver Resort. It has enough parking spaces to hold 170 aircraft; 16 of the parking spaces are specifically designed for multi-engine piston and jet aircraft. The airport is also serviced by Enterprise Rental Car.

== Facilities and aircraft ==
Sunriver Airport covers an area of 108 acres (44 ha) at an elevation of 4,164 feet (1,269 m) above mean sea level. It has one runway designated 18/36 with an asphalt surface measuring 5,455 by 75 feet (1,663 x 23 m).

For the 12-month period ending February 23, 2010, the airport had 6,150 aircraft operations, an average of 16 per day: 89% general aviation, 10% air taxi, and 1% military. At that time there were 71 aircraft based at this airport: 68% single-engine, 21% multi-engine, 6% jet, 3% helicopter, and 3% glider.

== See also ==
- Deschutes River
- Sunriver Observatory
