= Ronnie Bruno =

American businessman

- Born: Ronald G. Bruno
- Education: University of Alabama
- Occupation: Businessman
- Spouse: Lee Ann Bruno (m. 1982)
- Children: 1

Ronald G. Bruno is an American businessman. He was the chairman and chief executive officer of Bruno's, and was the co-founder and chairman of the Bruno Event Team.

In 2009, Bruno was inducted into the Alabama Sports Hall of Fame.
