= Regions Charity Classic =

Tournament information
- Location: Hoover, Alabama
- Established: 1992
- Course(s): Ross Bridge Golf Resort and Spa
- Par: 72
- Length: 7,525 yards
- Tour: Champions Tour
- Format: Stroke play
- Prize fund: $1,700,000
- Final year: 2010

Final champion
- Dan Forsman

The Regions Charity Classic, formerly known as the Bruno's Memorial Classic, was an American golf tournament on the Champions Tour. It was originally held at Greystone Golf & Country Club and moved to Ross Bridge Golf Resort and Spa, one of ten courses on the Robert Trent Jones Golf Trail, located in Hoover, Alabama (a suburb of Birmingham) in 2006. The tournament was founded in 1991 by Birmingham-based Bruno's Supermarkets. The event was managed by the Bruno family under its Bruno Event Team company.

Through 2006, the tournament was normally scheduled to end on the first Sunday of May of each year, or a few days close to that day. In 2007, the tournament schedule was moved roughly two weeks later, to May 17–20. The first two tournaments were held in August — frequently a time of hot, humid climate in Alabama. The dates were moved to June for three more years, then finally to the early May/late April period.

In 2010, organizers announced that the tournament would be superseded by the move of The Tradition, a Champions Tour major tournament, which is played at nearby Shoal Creek Golf and Country Club. Regions took on sponsorship of this event, which is now called "The Regions Tradition."

== History ==
The tournament was first held in 1992 as the Bruno's Memorial Classic, with Bruno's Supermarkets as the title sponsor. The name stems from the founders, Angelo and Lee Bruno (brothers of Bruno's founder Joseph Bruno), who were killed in an airplane crash shortly after the December 1991 press conference announcing the tournament's inception as the Bruno's Classic. From its beginning, the tournament was staged at the Greystone Golf & Country Club, in the Inverness section of the Birmingham suburb of Hoover.

Since its inception, the Bruno's Memorial Classic has been one of the most popular stops on the Champions Tour, usually attracting all of the top money winners. With the loss of the annual Iron Bowl college football game between Alabama and Auburn, which was formerly played at Birmingham's Legion Field, the golf tournament has become Metro Birmingham's largest sporting event.

In 2006, Bruno's Supermarkets—which had undergone a series of financial struggles, various ownerships, and the loss involvement by Bruno family members—announced it would reduce its sponsorship commitment to the tournament. Regions Financial Corporation, a banking and financial services company based in Birmingham, stepped in as the title sponsor, with Bruno's remaining as a presenting sponsor. At the same time, tournament organizers announced that the site would move to the new Ross Bridge course, approximately 15 miles (25 km) west of Greystone at the other end of the city of Hoover.

Ronnie Bruno, son of Angelo Bruno, continues to serve as chairman of the tournament. Additionally, the group that managed the tournament, run by Ronnie Bruno and Gene Hallman, later became a full-time event-management company known as the Bruno Event Team. The team runs a wide variety of events, mostly sports-related, including many championships for the Southeastern Conference.

On January 30, 2009, Bruno's Supermarkets confirmed that it would no longer be a presenting sponsor of the golf tournament thus ending its 17-year association with the event. (The company soon after declared bankruptcy, with the assets eventually becoming part of Belle Foods, which also subsequently went bankrupt.)

== Winners ==
Regions Charity Classic

- 2010 Dan Forsman
- 2009 Keith Fergus

Regions Charity Classic presented by Bruno's Supermarkets

- 2008 Andy Bean
- 2007 Brad Bryant
- 2006 Brad Bryant

Bruno's Memorial Classic

- 2005 D. A. Weibring
- 2004 Bruce Fleisher
- 2003 Tom Jenkins
- 2002 Sammy Rachels
- 2001 Hale Irwin
- 2000 John Jacobs
- 1999 Larry Nelson
- 1998 Hubert Green
- 1997 Jay Sigel
- 1996 John Bland
- 1995 Graham Marsh
- 1994 Jim Dent
- 1993 Bob Murphy
- 1992 George Archer
