= The Reserve Vineyards and Golf Club =

Golf club in Oregon, United States

The Reserve Vineyards & Golf Club
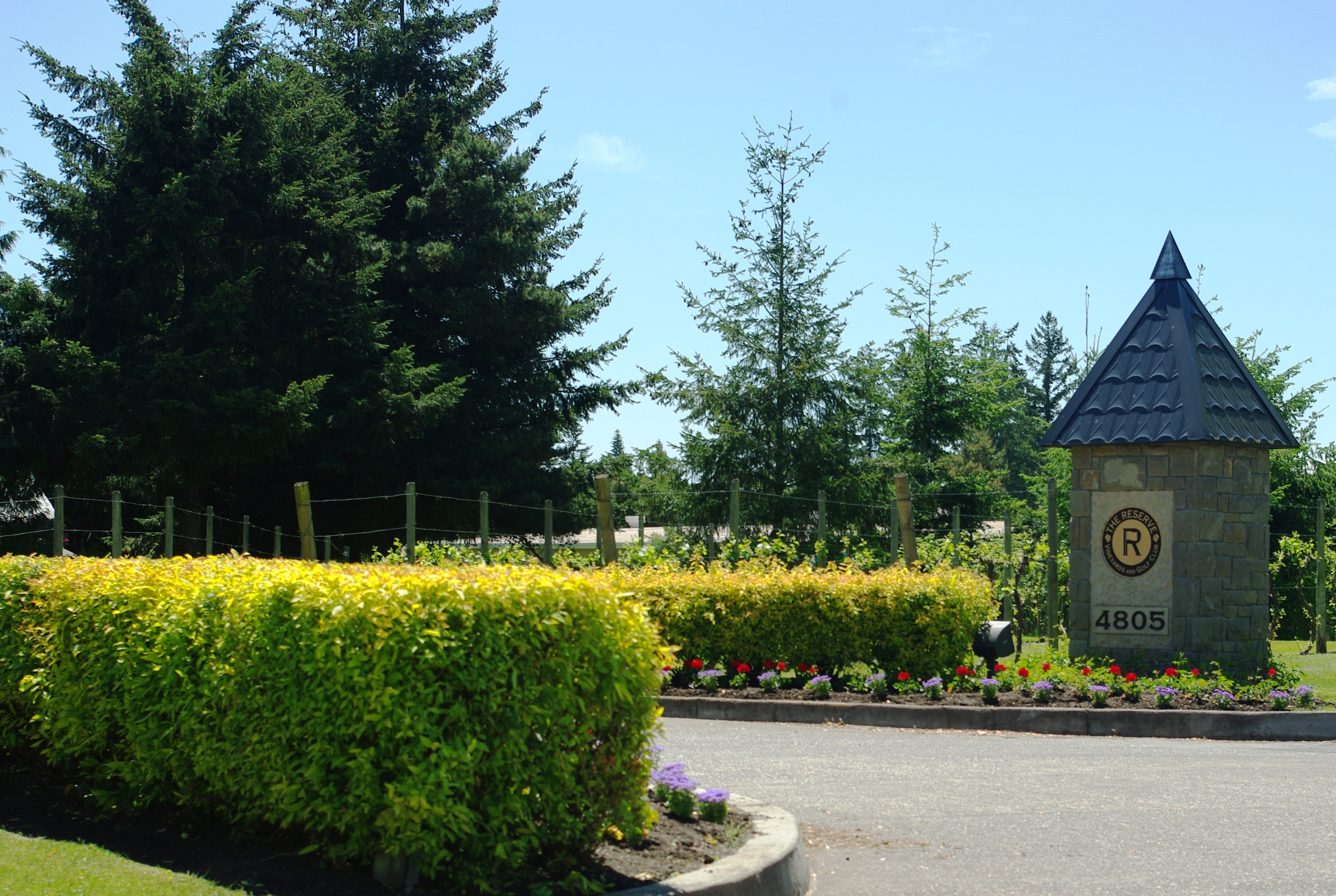
- Entrance in 2009

- Location within the United States Location within Oregon
- 45.485°N 122.918°W

Club information
- Location: near Hillsboro, Oregon, U.S.
- Elevation: 200 feet (60 m)
- Established: 1997; 29 years ago
- Type: private / public
- Owner: Westhood, Inc.
- Operator: Westhood, Inc.
- Tota holes: 36
- Tournaments: The Tradition; (2003–2006); Fred Meyer Challenge; (1998–2002)
- Website: reservegolf.com

South Course (The Fought)
- Designed by: John Fought
- Par: 72
- Length: 7,172 yards (6,558 m)
- Course rating: 74.7
- Slope rating: 142

North Course (The Cupp)
- Designed by: Robert E. Cupp
- Par: 72
- Length: 6,845 yards (6,259 m)
- Course rating: 73.8
- Slope rating: 130
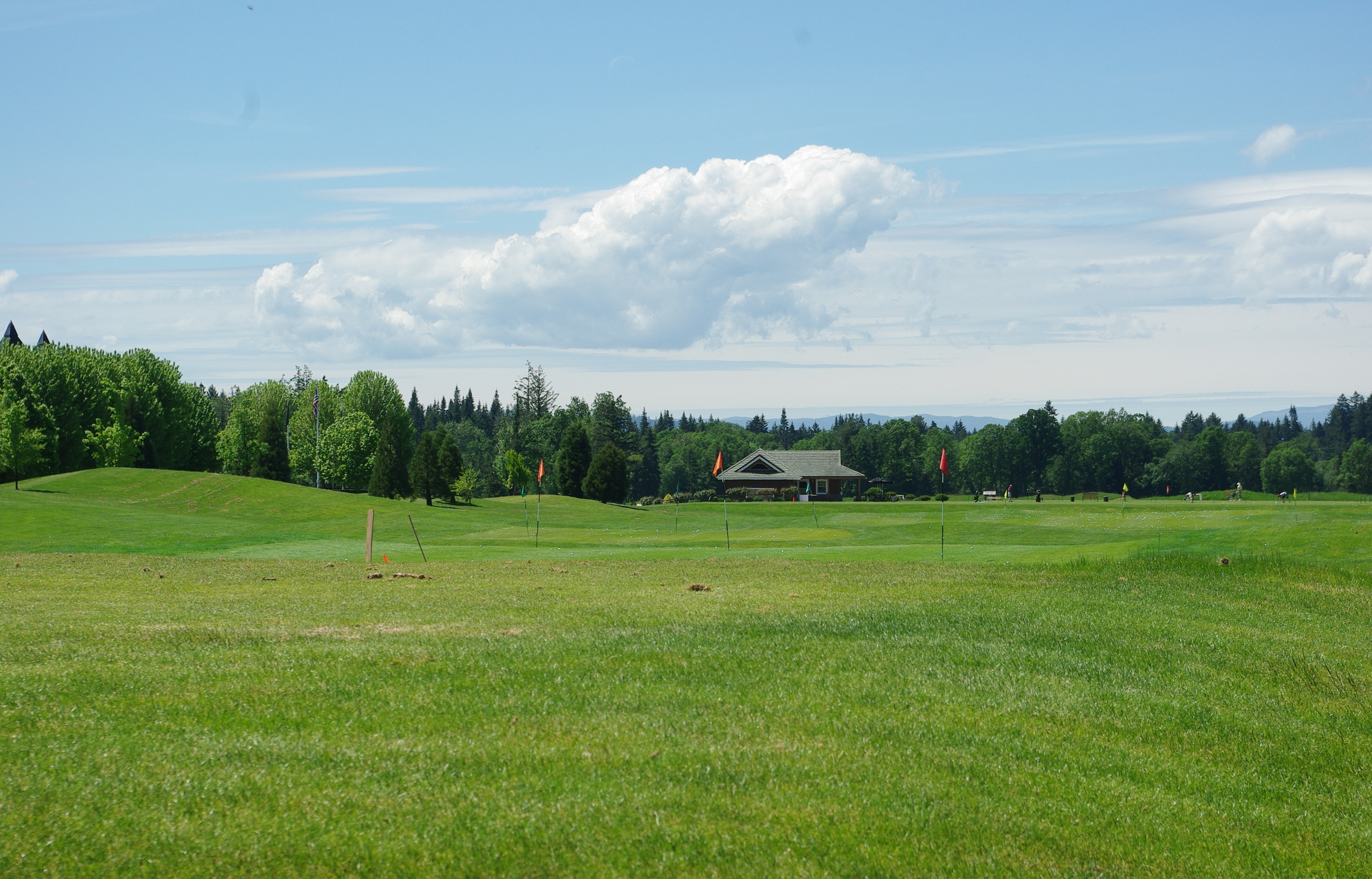
- Practice range

The Reserve Vineyards & Golf Club is a 36-hole private and public golf club in the northwest United States, located near Hillsboro, Oregon, a suburb west of Portland.

The award-winning club in Washington County opened 29 years ago in 1997 and hosted the PGA Tour Champions major, The Tradition from 2003 to 2006. It also was the site of the Fred Meyer Challenge from 1998 through 2002. Home to a pair of 18-hole courses, the club is south of Tualatin Valley Highway, east of Hillsboro.

== History ==
Development of The Reserve began in 1991 and involved Tom Kite and Bob Cupp's golf course development company. However, financing fell through and the company backed out. Eventually the $25 million project received financing from a Korean businessman with OB Sports developing the course with John Fought. The club opened in September 1997 with D.S. Parklane Development as the owner.

From 1998 to 2002, the club was host to the annual Fred Meyer Challenge, run by Portland tour professional Peter Jacobsen. From 2003 to 2006, The Reserve hosted the Champions Tour's JELD-WEN Tradition. That tournament had been held in Arizona at the Cochise Golf Course of the Golf Club at Desert Mountain in Scottsdale, and then moved to Central Oregon and the Crosswater Golf Club at Sunriver after its four-year run at The Reserve. It moved to Alabama in 2011 and is played in the spring.

== Facility ==
The club sits on 330 acres (1.3 km^{2}) between Aloha and Hillsboro. It is across the Tualatin River from Meriwether National Golf Course. When it first opened in 1997, memberships at this private and public course cost $15,000. The two 18-hole courses are rotated between being public and private daily. The wine-themed club has both a pro shop and restaurant, the Vintage Room, at the clubhouse and its own wine label.

== Courses ==
Designed by John Fought, the South Course has 110 bunkers over the 7,172 yards (6,558 m) with many trees as well. It was named the eighth-most difficult in Oregon and SW Washington by the Oregon Golf Association in 2006. This par 72 course was named fifteenth best in Oregon for 2007–08 by Golf Digest; its 453-yard (414 m) 17th hole earned the title of fifth best hole in 2003 by The Oregonian.

Bob Cupp designed the North Course which includes an 11-acre (4.5 ha) lake, a creek, and 25 bunkers over 6,845 yards (6,259 m). It also includes a 45,000-square-foot (4,200 m^{2}) green used for three holes. This course features rolling mounds and green surrounds with short-grass.
