= Big B Drugs =

Former drugstore chain

- Industry: Drugstore
- Founded: 1968
- Defunct: 1996
- Fate: Acquired by Revco (1996)
- Headquarters: Birmingham, Alabama

Big B, Inc. was a Birmingham, Alabama-based drugstore chain. Initially a division of Bruno's Supermarkets, it was later spun off as a separate company. Most of its stores were located next to a Bruno's or one of its discount chains, Food World and FoodMax. Big B also operated a discount drugstore chain called Drugs For Less.

Big B maintained stores in Alabama, Georgia, Tennessee, Florida, and Mississippi. All stores were within 400 miles of its distribution center in Birmingham, Alabama. The company had close to $800 million (~$1.47 billion in 2024) in revenue by the end of 1996 and was considered the 10th largest drugstore chain in the country.

== History ==
Big B began operation in 1968 as division of Birmingham-based Bruno's Supermarkets. In July 1977, Big B's 38 stores were organized as a separate subsidiary from the Bruno's Supermarkets. In 1981, it was formally spun off as an independent company, Big B, Inc., based in Bessemer, Alabama.

Between 1982 and 1986, Big B opened 32 stores outside of Alabama, including 12 in Georgia, 10 in the Florida panhandle, seven in Mississippi, and three in Tennessee. By the end of its 1986 fiscal year, the chain operated 150 Big B stores. At this time, it also had five B-Mart combo stores, four Big B Home Health Care Centers, and a Drugs For Less deep discount store. In 1989, Big B acquired 85 Reed Drug and Lee Drug stores from Peoples Drug, giving them a presence in Atlanta, north Georgia and western Alabama. These stores were converted to the Big B format.

By 1990, the chain had opened its 300th store and needed to expand its distribution center. It now had 16 Drugs For Less locations. In 1992, the company launched a mail-order prescription drug program and acquired a nursing home pharmacy service. In 1993, Big B acquired 45 Treasury Drug stores from JCPenney's Thrift Drug division for $16.5 million.

In September 1996, Revco initiated a hostile takeover of Big B. The chain had 397 stores in five states at the time. By November, Big B had agreed to the merger. However, Revco was acquired by CVS within the year. By the end of 1997, all Big B Drugs and Revco were operating as CVS/Pharmacy.
