= Southern Family Markets =

American supermarket chain

- Type: Grocery Store
- Industry: Retail
- Founded: 2005
- Headquarters: Birmingham, Alabama
- Products: Dairy, deli, frozen foods, grocery, meat, produce, general merchandise, pharmacy, health and beauty care
- Website: www.cswg.com

Southern Family Markets, headquartered in Birmingham, Alabama, was a chain of American supermarkets owned and operated by C&S Wholesale Grocers, a distributor based in Keene, New Hampshire. The chain was operated as an affiliate of C&S. Southern Family Markets had operated a varying number of supermarkets and 10 liquor stores under the banners Southern Family Markets, Piggly Wiggly, Bruno's, and Food World. The liquor stores, all located along the gulf coast, were called SFM Liquors.

C&S created the chain in 2005, when it acquired 104 stores from BI-LO, which operated stores under the BI-LO, Bruno's Supermarkets, Food World, FoodMax and Food Fair brand names. These stores were primarily smaller and older, and frequently found in declining neighborhoods and were converted over to SFM over a period of nearly one year. Before ever becoming Southern Family stores, eight locations in the Knoxville, Tennessee market were sold to K-Va-T Food Stores.

At its apex, SFM consisted of 88 supermarkets. In addition, Southern Family acquired 7 stores from Winn-Dixie, which had been undergoing a retrenchment out of upper regions of the Southeast, back toward its home base of Florida due to bankruptcy restructuring of the company. These stores were located in North Carolina, Alabama, and Mississippi. By 2010, most of these locations had closed, though SFM continued to operate the Athens, Alabama store under the Piggly Wiggly banner as well as a location in Columbus, Mississippi.

Under increasing competition from other grocers, supercenters, warehouse stores and natural food stores, Southern Family Markets announced in August 2006 that they would either close or sell 30 stores in Alabama, Georgia, and Mississippi along with their complete North Carolina market of 17 stores. This also led to a significant round of SFM headquarters layoffs (over 60 displaced employees), particularly to those employees without Bruno's or C&S background. These layoffs took place in late August and September 2006. Soon after, on November 30, 2006, Southern Family Markets announced that it was closing all 7 stores in Tennessee, then announced on January 5, 2007 that it would close all six stores in its hometown of Birmingham, Alabama.

In August 2007, C&S converted six Southern Family stores in Georgia to the Piggly Wiggly brand name. In October 2007, seven Southern Family stores in Alabama were converted to the Piggly Wiggly banner. In January 2008, three additional Southern Family stores in Alabama were converted to Piggly Wiggly's as well.

On April 30, 2009, as part of the Bruno's Supermarkets bankruptcy proceedings, Southern Family Markets agreed to purchase 31 Bruno's locations on a "going concern" basis in a $45.8 million deal. In partnership with Hilco Liquidations, Southern Family Markets held "going out of business" sales at the 25 Bruno's, Food World, and Foodmax stores that they did not acquire. The purchase would return the company to a retail presence in metro Birmingham, with six Bruno's and Food World locations remaining open.

In September 2009, SFM announced plans to close stores in Carrollton, Dublin, and Macon, Georgia due to underperformance. In March 2010, two stores in Huntsville, Alabama closed for the same reasons. On October 5, 2010, Southern Family Markets announced the closings of the Food World stores in Trussville and Pelham (both in the Birmingham, Alabama area). This made a total of 11 stores to close since SFM/C&S Wholesale acquired Bruno's Supermarkets in mid 2009.

On July 1, 2012, all 57 Southern Family owned locations in Alabama, Georgia, Mississippi and Florida were sold to Belle Foods. As part of the agreement, C&S would continue as Belle Foods main distributor. In July, 2013, Belle Foods filed for filed for Chapter 11 bankruptcy protection. The case was closed on July 09, 2019.

== Leadership ==
There were several CEO/President/General Managers since the inception of the company in 2005. Frank Curci (now CEO at Tops Markets in New York) was the first CEO and left the company in early 2006. He was followed by Bill White (not related to the current owner) who came from Maryland but had been a previous senior staffer with Bruno's and Piggly Wiggly in Vidalia, Georgia. White left in 2007 and was replaced by Jeff Burkhead (whose title was General Manager, not CEO). Burkhead was a district manager with Bruno's and then SFM before being elevated to the new top position. Burkhead was replaced in 2010 by Max Henderson, who ironically, had a background with Tops Markets (the home of the first SFM CEO Frank Curci). Henderson was familiar with the operations of C&S Wholesale Grocers, the owners of SFM. Henderson reported to C&S executives Bob Palmer and Rick Cohen. Most of the SFM corporate employees were either former Bruno's or C&S employees. Jeff Burkhead left the company in the spring of 2010 and now is the owner/operator of a single supermarket in Memphis, Tennessee. Max Henderson exited the company when Belle Foods took over in July 2012.

== Banners ==
SFM had been steadily converting the store names of its remaining locations from Southern Family Markets to either Piggly Wiggly or re-using the Bruno's/Food World name in some of the locations, having acquired in the 2009 purchase Bruno's assets from Lone Star Funds. Belle Foods' intention is to re-banner all remaining stores as Belle Foods.

== Future and Belle Foods ==
On July 1, 2012, Belle Foods took over the store operation of 57 Southern Family Markets stores located in Alabama, Georgia, Mississippi and Florida, which it had acquired. Belle Foods President and CEO Bill White says he "sees great growth potential for the company and its employees," and the chain will continue to use C&S as its primary supplier. After this transaction, Southern Family Markets (both store name and corporate name) exists no more. However, many of the employees, both corporate and retail, are holdovers from the previous regime. Belle Foods rebranded two of their Birmingham stores in July 2012 and plan to continue to rebrand all remaining stores at a rate of 8-10 per quarter until all 57 stores are under the Belle Foods banner.

== Headquarters ==
SFM headquarters was located in part of the former Bruno's headquarters located on Lakeshore Parkway in Birmingham, Alabama. C&S has been trying to sell or lease not only the part of the campus being used by SFM but the portion used by Bruno's until Fall 2008, but had not been able to find a tenant. A move from the Bruno's building was announced in 2005 but was never made. No new location was ever disclosed when the announcement was made.

C&S Wholesale Grocers has subleased portions of the warehouse space to other parties (Rooms To Go is a tenant) since 2008. The warehouse was over 1,000,000 sq ft (93,000 m^{2}). of space and with the declining volume of groceries shipped from the facility each year, less space was needed to maintain the remaining business. Therefore, space was freed up for other entities to lease.

Belle Foods is using the same office space that SFM had occupied since 2005. There are no plans to move the headquarters as Belle Foods supply agreement includes leasing office space for the headquarters.
