= Bruno's =

American grocery store chain

Bruno's Supermarkets, LLC
- Industry: Retail grocer
- Founded: 1932
- Founder: Joseph Sam Bruno
- Defunct: 2012 (re-emerged 2014)
- Headquarters: Birmingham, Alabama
- Products: Dairy, deli, frozen foods, grocery, meat, produce, snacks, health and beauty
- Parent: Belle Foods

Bruno's Supermarkets, LLC was an American chain of grocery stores with its headquarters in Birmingham, Alabama.

It was founded in 1932 by Joseph Bruno in Birmingham. During the company's pinnacle, it operated over 300 stores under the names Bruno's, Food World, Foodmax, Food Fair, Fresh Value, Vincent's Markets, Piggly Wiggly, Consumer Foods, and American Fare in Alabama, Florida, Georgia, Mississippi, Tennessee, and South Carolina. The chain was acquired by Birmingham-based Belle Foods which discontinued the brand in 2012.

== History ==
In 1932, Joseph Sam Bruno (October 2, 1912 – January 24, 1996), the son of immigrants from Bisacquino, Sicily, bought a small market in Birmingham, Alabama for $600 and started a family business. Early on, Bruno differentiated his store by buying in volume and selling high-quality goods at low prices. By 1952, Bruno and his five brothers operated four stores and a warehouse. Bruno's incorporated in 1958, having expanded to 10 stores by then. In 1968, the company launched a drug store chain under the Big B Drugs name in Birmingham, Alabama. The business was formally separated from Bruno's in 1977 and spun off as its own business in 1981.

Bruno's became a publicly traded company in 1971. In 1972, Bruno's opened its discount grocery chain, Food World, which was followed by warehouse-oriented Consumer Foods. In 1977, Angelo Bruno, Joe's younger brother, was named CEO. As Food World and Consumer Foods became more profitable, the old Bruno's stores began to be phased out. Consumer Foods was replaced by Food Fair in 1983, and Bruno's opened its first Foodmax stores in 1984. Angelo was elected chairman of the company in 1985.

By the end of the 1980s, Bruno's was considered a dominant force, not only in Alabama, but in the Southeastern US. In 1988, Bruno's acquired Piggly Wiggly Southern, which operated 82 stores in Georgia. The company also partnered with Kmart to create a new Hypermarket, called American Fare. The chain opened three locations in Atlanta in 1989.

On December 11, 1991, the nearly $3 billion (~$6.14 billion in 2024) company suffered a catastrophic tragedy when its corporate jet crashed into Lavender Mountain in Rome, Georgia, killing everyone on board: Angelo Bruno (chairman), Lee Bruno (vice chairman), Sam Vacarella (SVP, merchandising), Edward C. Hyde (VP, store operations) Randy Page (VP, personnel), Karl Molica (director of produce), and Mary Faust (advertising executive). Following the crash, only a handful of executives were left, including founder Joe A. Bruno and president and chief executive Ronald Bruno. Bruno's stock, trading at $21 eight months before the plane crash, fell to $9.50 by March 1993.

The 1990s also saw the reintroduction of the Bruno's name on storefronts, including Bruno's Supercenters and Bruno's Food and Pharmacy. In 1994 Bruno’s sold its interest in American Fare to Kmart and those locations would live on as Super Kmart Center. In April, it converted nine FoodMax locations to the Bruno's nameplate in the Atlanta market. Paul F. Garrison was named president and COO in May, making him the first person outside the Bruno family to hold the position. In August, it sold 15 stores in Tennessee and Georgia. That year, Bruno's began converting its Foodmax stores to Albertsons. In December, the chain also acquired the Memphis-based Seessel's for $62 million.

=== Leveraged buyout and bankruptcy ===
In 1995, the company was acquired by Kohlberg Kravis Roberts (KKR), a leveraged buyout firm, for over $1 billion. At the time, Bruno's was operating 254 supermarkets in the South under the Food World, Foodfair and Piggly Wiggly names. By the following year, the company sold 42 stores in south-central Georgia and South Carolina, as well as a Georgia-based distribution center. Following the deal, Bruno's had 213 stores in Alabama, Mississippi, Georgia, Florida, and Tennessee, and left the South Carolina market. In January 1996, Joseph Bruno died at the age of 83. In August 1997, Bruno's terminated its franchise agreement with Piggly Wiggly, which had stood since 1948. The 16 stores were converted to the FoodMax banner. In January 1998, Bruno's sold 13 stores and exited the Atlanta market.

That acquisition was ill-fated, as the company's debt structure combined with management missteps and increased competition proved too much for the chain to overcome. The company's management failed to implement a frequent-shopper program, establish clear pricing policies, or create an effective store-reduction program. This resulted in warehouse and stocking problems, which hurt customer satisfaction and employee morale. By February 1998, the chain filed for Chapter 11 bankruptcy. KKR was sued the following year by investors for the losses they accrued; the case wasn't settled until 2010. Bruno's emerged from bankruptcy in 2000 with 152 stores after closing a number of unprofitable locations. Later in the year, it bought 12 Delchamps stores out of bankruptcy from Jitney Jungle, part of a purchase of 19 stores for $11 million.

=== Sale to Ahold and Lone Star ===
Bruno's was sold in December 2001 to Ahold, a Dutch corporation, for $500 million. The chain was then combined with BI-LO beginning in 2003. The new management struggled as well, and an accounting scandal ultimately damaged the company's attempts to expanded into the United States. In 2005, Ahold sold the combined operation to Lone Star Funds, a private investment company, for $560 million.

Lone Star moved the company's headquarters to South Carolina, then sold 104 stores to C&S Wholesale Grocers, which operated them under its Southern Family Markets affiliate before closing them in 2007. As Bruno's primary supplier, C&S also owned and operated the logistics and warehouses of the chain through a deal with Lone Star. By September 2005, Bruno's had 36 stores.

On March 20, 2007, Lone Star Funds announced it had spun out Bruno's from BI-LO creating a separate corporate entity. The reorganization left Lone Star with 23 Bruno's stores, 42 Food Worlds, and two Food Max locations. The chain then moved back to an Alabama headquarters. Seven unprofitable stores were closed as a result of this transaction.

In October 2008, Bruno's announced plans to close 22 of its 40 in-store pharmacies. This left Bruno's with 18 in-store pharmacies within the 66 stores it ran at the time. All inventories and records were sold to CVS/pharmacy, and all employees were either offered severance packages or employment with CVS.

In December 2008 the corporate offices were moved to International Park office park located in Hoover, Alabama. The move left Bruno's headquarters in Birmingham with C&S. By the end of the year, Bruno's operated just 22 stores.

=== Second bankruptcy ===
On February 5, 2009, Bruno's announced plans to enter into Chapter 11 bankruptcy reorganisation proceedings. President and CEO Kent Moore resigned and the Company appointed Jim Grady, Senior Director with Alvarez & Marsal, as Chief Restructuring Officer. At the time of the filing, the chain had 66 Bruno's and Food World stores in Alabama and Florida, along with more than 4,000 workers. Another 10 stores were closed.

In March 2009, Bruno's filed a motion in bankruptcy court requesting approval to renegotiate its agreement with UFCW Local 1657 in order to remove the successor clause from its contracts. The clause requires any acquirer, of the company or any of its stores, to honor the union's collective bargaining agreement. The removal of this clause was hoped to make the chain more marketable to potential buyers. The court ruled on April 27 that the successor clause and the rest of the collective bargaining agreements would remain intact.

In April, Bruno's assets were auctioned.Southern Family Markets, a subsidiary of C&S Wholesale Grocers took possession of 57 locations and elected to operate 31 of them. The remaining 25 stores were handed over to liquidators. All of the 25 closing stores were closed by May 31, 2009.

Southern Family Markets additionally purchased the rights to the banners of Bruno's, Food World, Food Fair, Food Max, and Vincent's Markets, and did not allow Bruno's Supermarkets, LLC to operate under any name which contains any of those banners.

Southern Family Markets continued the use of the Bruno's and Food World brands, and did not convert any of the stores to the Southern Family Markets banner. In fact, some former Food World stores operating under the Southern Family Markets name were converted back to Food World, such as the location in Scottsboro, Alabama.

=== Belle Foods and third bankruptcy ===
In late 2011, newly formed Birmingham-based Belle Foods purchased Southern Family Markets and its 57 stores in Florida, Georgia, Alabama and Mississippi. The company announced they would rebrand all locations to the Belle Foods name, eliminating the Bruno's brand entirely. All of the company's Piggly Wiggly stores in Georgia changed to the Belle Foods name. In 2013, Belle Foods filed or bankruptcy.

The store on McFarland Boulevard in Tuscaloosa was renamed to Bruno's Supermarket by owner Bill White. In spring 2014, the store's refrigeration units broke and were unable to be fixed. After discontinuing the sale of frozen foods, the store closed permanently a few months later.

== Stores ==
Bruno's operated multiple store formats over the years. Bruno's operated as a combination-store format, while Food World and Fresh Value were conventional formats. FoodMax combined elements of Bruno's and Food World, and Food Fair and Piggly Wiggly were neighborhood stores.

Other stores under the company's control were Consumer Warehouse Foods, Bruno's Finer Foods, and Bruno's Food and Pharmacy. Vincent's Market, was tried in a one-location experiment in Homewood, Alabama. The experimental store featured a wide variety of prepared foods as well as regular grocery sales. Around 2000, Vincent's Market was converted to the Bruno's nameplate, and the Vincent's Market name was applied to the deli/bakery departments in all existing Bruno's stores.

== Sports sponsorship ==
In an effort to memorialize Angelo and Lee Bruno, The Bruno's Classic, a PGA Seniors Tour tournament that had been announced just prior to the crash, was renamed the Bruno's Memorial Classic. After 14 years in Birmingham, the tournament moved to Hoover in 2005.

The ARCA race at Talledega was sponsored by Bruno's subsidiary Food World from 1994 to 1995 and again from 2001 to 2006. It was called the Food World 500k in 1994 and 1995, the Food World 300 from 2001 to 2005 and the Food World 250 in 2006.
