= Greystone Golf & Country Club =

Private golf club in Alabama

- Location within the United States Location within Alabama
- 33.43°N 86.651°W

Club information
- Location: 4100 Greystone Drive; Hoover, Alabama, U.S.
- Elevation: 680 feet (205 m)
- Established: 1991, 35 years ago
- Type: Private
- Total holes: 38
- Tournaments: Regions Tradition (2016– ) Bruno's Memorial Classic (1992–2005)
- Greens: Champion Bermuda
- Fairways: 419 Bermuda

Founders
- Designed by: Bob Cupp and Hubert Green
- Course rating: 76.1
- Slope rating: 142

Legacy
- Designed by: Rees Jones
- Course rating: 74.3
- Slope rating: 146

Greystone Golf & Country Club is a private 36-hole golf club in the southeastern United States, located in Hoover, Alabama, a suburb southeast of Birmingham.

Opened in 1991, the first of the two courses was the Founders Course, designed by Bob Cupp and Hubert Green. The Legacy Course opened in 2000, designed by Rees Jones. The Legacy Course is currently ranked #89 in Golf Week's Top 100 Residential Courses.

From 1992–2005, the club hosted the Bruno's Memorial Classic on the senior tour. The Founders Course was so beloved by the players, officials, and media that they voted it in a Sports Illustrated poll as the #1 stop on the tour two years in a row.

Since 2016, the Founders Course has hosted the Regions Traditions, a senior major championship. It had been held nearby at Shoal Creek for the previous five editions.

Michael Jordan lived in the gated community on Shandwick Place during 1994 when he played for the Birmingham Barons. Initially wanting to rent a home, Jordan wound up staying for free in a home owned by Richard Scrushy. Scrushy allowed Jordan to stay for free in exchange for playing golf with him.
