= Camp Abbot =

U.S. Army installation

- Deschutes County, Oregon, near Bend
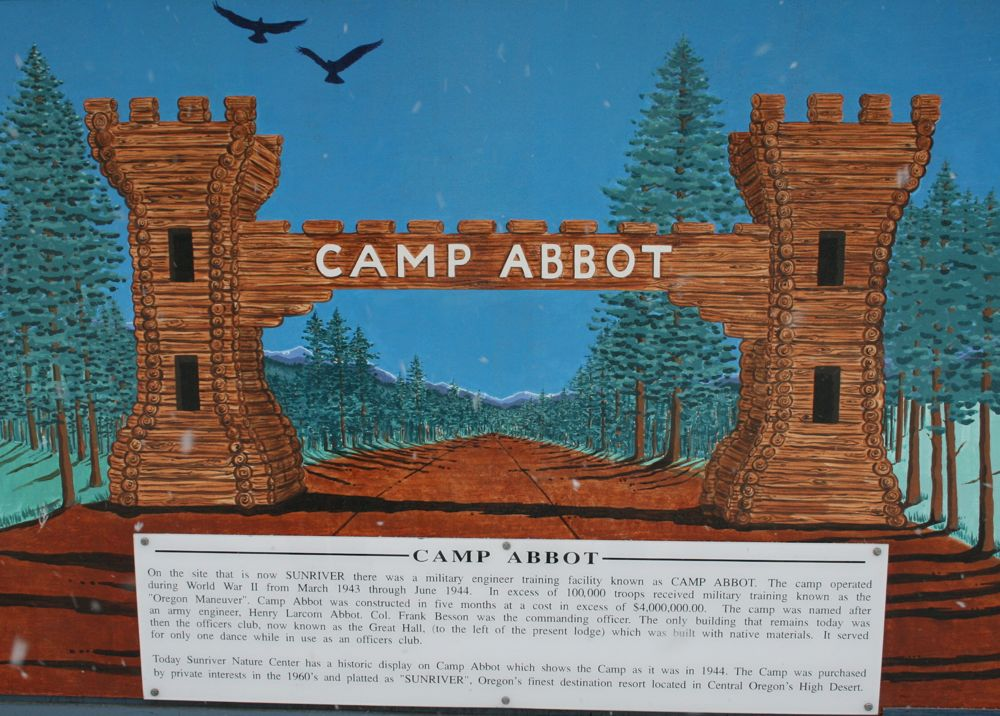
- World War II combat engineer training center

Site information
- Type: Military cantonments
- Owner: U.S. Forest Service - public; Sunriver Resort; Limited Partnership - private

Location
- Location in the United States Location in Oregon
- Coordinates: 43.873°N 121.445°W

Site history
- Built: 1942
- Built by: U.S. Army Corps of Engineers
- In use: March 1943 - June 1944
- Demolished: ca. 1945

Camp Abbot was a military training center in the northwest United States, located in central Oregon south of Bend. Active for less than sixteen months, the U.S. Army camp was used to train combat engineers during World War II and was named for Henry Larcom Abbot.

A large part of site is now the residential and resort community of Sunriver, and the rest has been incorporated into the Deschutes National Forest. The only remaining structure from Camp Abbot is the officers' mess hall; now part of the resort and known as the Great Hall, it is used for large conferences and special events.

== Site history ==
In 1855, Secretary of War Jefferson Davis dispatched an Army Corps of Topographical Engineers survey party to look for a railroad route from the Sacramento Valley in California to the Columbia River in the Oregon Territory. This required the party to survey the Deschutes River area in central Oregon. The survey party was led by two lieutenants, Robert Stockton Williamson and Henry Larcom Abbot.

The Williamson-Abbot survey party included a geologist-botanist, a physician-naturalist, several assistant engineers, a computation specialist, a pack master, and eighteen mule packers. At Fort Reading, a military escort of eighty infantrymen and twenty cavalry troopers joined the party. The escort was commanded by Lieutenant H. G. Gibson with Lieutenants George Crook and Philip H. Sheridan leading elements of the detachment.

While in central Oregon, illness forced Williamson to return to California, which left Abbot in charge of the expedition. On 4 September 1855, Abbot and a detachment of the survey party camped along the Deschutes River, near the site of the future Camp Abbot. He completed the survey of central Oregon, crossed the Cascade Mountains into the Willamette Valley, and then returned to Fort Reading, arriving in mid-November 1855. The Army published Abbot's thorough 499-page report in 1857 under the title Report of Lieut. Henry L. Abbot Upon Explorations for a Railroad Route from Sacramento Valley to the Columbia River.

== World War II ==
During World War II, the Army needed to rapidly expand its combat engineer training. On 4 December 1942, the War Department established a 5,500-acre (8.6 sq mi; 22 km^{2}) combat engineer replacement and training center in central Oregon, along the Deschutes River south of Bend. It was named in honor of Brigadier General Henry Larcom Abbot, who had led a survey party through the area in 1855.

The first trainees arrived at Camp Abbot in March 1943, even before the camp was formally dedicated on 2 September 1943. At that time, it was one of only three combat engineer training centers in the country, along with Fort Belvoir (Virginia) and Fort Leonard Wood (Missouri).

Approximately 10,000 soldiers were trained during each 17-week cycle, with training conducted in three phases. The first part of the course focused on rifle marksmanship and other basic combat skills. The first phase also included special training on hand grenades, anti-tank mines, and other combat engineering tasks. The second phase was demolition training. During that phase, trainees learned how to build and destroy bridges and other structures. The final phase was three weeks of field maneuvers carried out under combat conditions.

Over 90,000 combat engineers were trained at Camp Abbot before the center was closed in June 1944, shortly after the D-Day landings. Most of the camp structures were demolished shortly after the training center closed.

== Post-war development ==
In the years following the war, a portion of the camp property was returned to the U.S. Forest Service, but approximately 3,800 acres (6 sq mi; 15 km^{2}) were sold as private land. That property changed hands a number of times, until it was purchased by John Gray in 1965. Gray began development of Sunriver Resort, selling the first residential lots in 1968.

Today, Sunriver is a residential community along with a luxury resort with a 250-room lodge, golf courses, restaurants, and an executive airport. There are approximately 4,000 homes along with a small commercial district that supports the shopping needs of the community. Alpine skiing is nearby at Mount Bachelor.

== Original structures ==
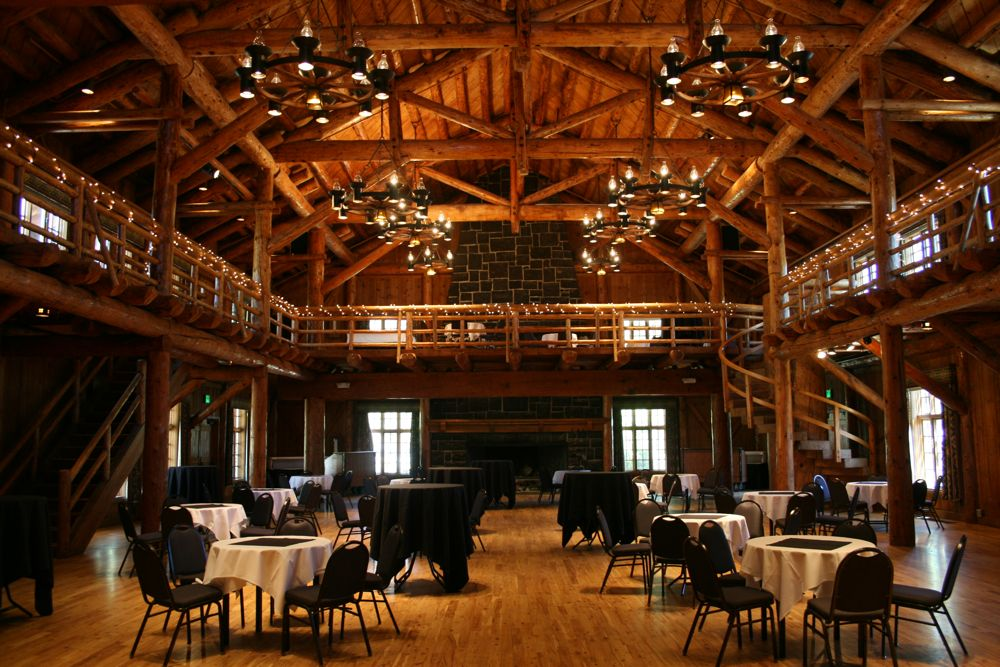
Officers' mess, now the Great Hall at Sunriver Resort (shown in 2007)

Today, only one original Camp Abbot building remains. The officers' mess hall was built in 1943 by the Army Corps of Engineers under the direction of Captain John V. Banks. It remains at its original location as Sunriver Resort's Great Hall, used for large conferences and special events, such as banquets and weddings.

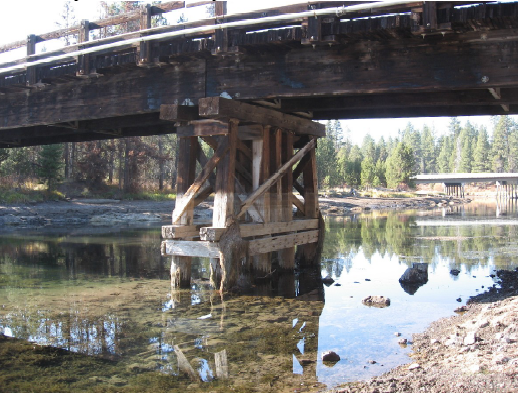
General Patch Bridge in 2008

The historic Great Hall is an impressive log structure measuring 50 by 96 feet (15 by 29 m), constructed with native stone and logs cut near the building site. It has a high ceiling with exposed beams, a large stone fireplace, and a balcony overlooking the main floor. There are also small side rooms including an intimate fireside room and a number of conference rooms. In 1993, Sunriver Resort completed a major renovation of the historic Great Hall, and it is now a modern facility with unique architectural character.

The only other major Camp Abbot structure to survive for an extended period was the General Patch Bridge which was constructed in 1943 by Army engineers during the Oregon Maneuver. The Oregon Maneuver was the largest military field exercise ever conducted in the Pacific Northwest. Named for General Alexander M. Patch, who led it, the maneuver involved over 100,000 army troops, many of them combat engineers based at Camp Abbot. The maneuver extended across six eastern Oregon counties. Camp Abbot was used as the exercise headquarters because of its central location and military infrastructure.

The General Patch Bridge was located on Deschutes National Forest land within the boundaries of old Camp Abbott. It was demolished by the Forest Service in 2008 because the structure was unsafe.

Other structures, such as the barracks, were auctioned off by the Army as surplus. Two such barracks were bought by J.H. Gibbons, a Texas rancher, and converted to use as a hunting and fishing lodge, which was completed in 1948 and remains in use today on the Gibbons Ranch in San Saba County, Texas.
