= Meriwether National Golf Club =

Golf club in Washington County, Oregon

- Interactive map of Meriwether National Golf Club
- 45.4815°N 122.9441°W

Club information
- Location: Washington County, near Hillsboro, Oregon, U.S.
- Established: 1961
- Type: Public
- Operator: National Golf Courses, Inc.
- Tota holes: 27
- Tournaments: 2004 OGA Public Links Championship
- Website: meriwethergolf.com

North Course
- Designed by: Fred Federspiel
- Par: 36
- Length: 3,373 yards

West Course
- Designed by: Dave Powers
- Par: 36
- Length: 3,346 yards

South Course
- Par: 36
- Length: 3,406

Meriwether National Golf Club is a 27-hole golf club in Washington County, just south of Hillsboro, Oregon, United States. Opened in 1961, it has two regulation-length nine-hole courses and an executive-length (par 30) course located along the Tualatin River in suburban Portland, Oregon. The Reserve Vineyards & Golf Club is situated just across the river to the east.

== History ==
Meriwether opened in the spring of 1961 with nine-holes, with an additional nine-holes finished in 1962. When it opened the course was among the longest in the Northwest. Bob Rosburg served as the course’s first golf pro, and was at Meriwether from 1961 to 1964. In 1994, the club expanded by adding nine holes to the course and building a new clubhouse at a cost of $4.7 million. The new clubhouse cost $2 million and is 11,000 square feet (1,000 m^{2}).

Regional flooding in the winter of 1996 closed the course for two months. In 1997, the course hosted the Portland Rose Festival’s Kiwanis for Kids Golf Tournament. By 2004 most of the damage from the 1996 flooding had been repaired and additional improvements were made that year. That year Meriwether hosted the 2004 Oregon Golf Association’s Public Links Championship. In 2006, the course played host to the Oregon Junior Stroke Play Championships, and in 2008 hosts part of the college level Pacific Invitational.

== Facilities ==
The golf club includes a covered driving range, putting greens, and chipping greens. The course clubhouse includes a restaurant and golf pro shop. Meriwether has two regulation length courses with water hazards, trees, and bunkers.

=== Courses ===
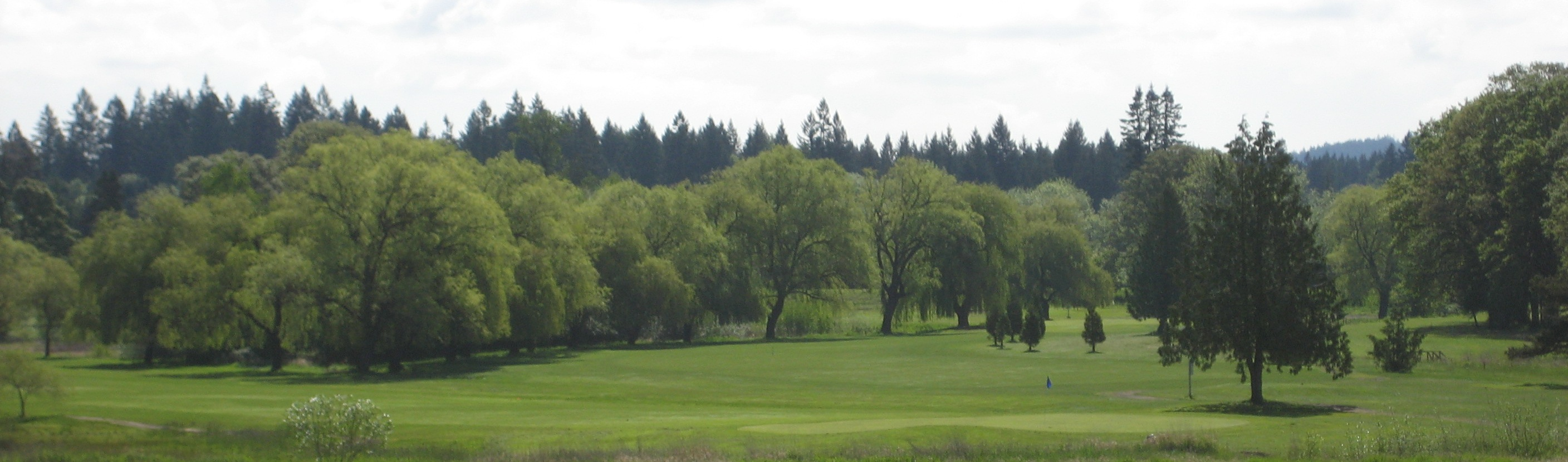

The nine-hole Executive course measures 1,789 yards and is a par 30. It was designed in 1961 by Dave Powers. Also at the club is the nine-hole, par 36 North course. Designed by Fred Federspiel and opened in 1961, it is 3,373 yards from the back tees. The Executive course challenges golfers of all abilities with contoured greens making up for the lack of distance.

Both the West and South (south course was closed in 2015) courses are nine holes and par 36s. The West was designed by Powers and measures 3,346 yards, and opened in 1961. The South opened in 1994 and measures 3,406 yards. The West and North courses comprise the usual 18-hole rotation with the South course handling 9-hole play.

The putting course was removed about 2002 or 2003.
