= Crosswater Club =

Private golf club in Sunriver, Oregon

- Location within the United States Location within Oregon
- 43.853°N 121.447°W

Club information
- Location: Sunriver, Oregon, U.S.
- Elevation: 4,160 feet (1,270 m)
- Established: 1995, 31 years ago
- Type: private
- Tota holes: 18
- Tournaments: The Tradition (2007–2010); PGA Professional National Championship (2001, 2007, 2013, 2017)
- Website: crosswater.com
- Designed by: Robert E. Cupp
- Par: 72
- Length: 7,683 yards (7,025 m)
- Course rating: 76.5
- Slope rating: 145

Crosswater Club is a private golf club in the northwest United States, located in central Oregon at Sunriver, southwest of Bend.

Opened 31 years ago in 1995, the par-72 golf course was designed by Robert E. Cupp and plays to 7,683 yards (7,025 m), at an approximate average elevation of 4,160 feet (1,270 m) above sea level. It occupies about 600 acres (2.4 km^{2}) of wetlands and woodlands along the Deschutes and Little Deschutes rivers.

At its opening in 1995, it was the longest course in the United States.

The course hosted the JELD-WEN Tradition tournament for four years, from 2007 to 2010, a senior major championship. It has also hosted the PGA Professional National Championship four times: 2001, 2007, 2013, and 2017.
