= The Tradition =

Annual over-50s major golf championship

Coordinates: 33.4294°N 86.6508°W

Tournament information
- Location: Birmingham, Alabama, U.S.
- Established: 1989
- Courses: Greystone Golf and Country Club (Founders Course)
- Par: 72
- Length: 7,277 yards (6,654 m)
- Tour: PGA Tour Champions
- Format: Stroke play
- Prize fund: US$2,500,000
- Month played: May

Tournament record score
- Aggregate: 265 Doug Tewell (2001); 265 Steve Stricker (2023)
- To par: −23 as above

Current champion
- (United States) Stewart Cink

Final champion
- Location in the United States Location in Alabama

The Tradition (known as the Regions Tradition for sponsorship reasons) is an event on the PGA Tour Champions. First staged 37 years ago in 1989, the PGA Tour recognizes the event as one of the five senior major golf championships. Unlike the U.S. Senior Open, Senior PGA Championship and Senior Open Championship, it is not recognized as a major by the European Senior Tour, and is not part of that tour's official schedule. It is the only senior major where the winner does not earn an exemption into a PGA Tour or European Tour event.

== Locations ==
=== Arizona ===
From its inception in 1989 through 2001, the tournament was held in Arizona at the Cochise Golf Course of the Golf Club at Desert Mountain in Scottsdale. In 2002, it was held at the Prospector Course of Superstition Mountain Golf & Country Club near Gold Canyon. While in Arizona, the event was played in early April.

=== Oregon ===
In 2003, the event relocated to northwest Oregon for four years at the South Course of The Reserve Vineyards and Golf Club in Hillsboro, just west of Portland. Following the 2006 edition, it moved to the high desert of central Oregon for four years, to the Crosswater Club in Sunriver, south of Bend. The lengthy course sits on 600 acres (2.4 km^{2}) of woodlands and preserved wetlands along the Deschutes River, at an average elevation of 4,170 feet (1,270 m) above sea level. The par-72 layout played at 7,316 yards (6,690 m) in 2009. During the eight years in Oregon, the event was held in mid- to late August.

=== Alabama ===
Following the 2010 event, Birmingham, Alabama–based Regions Financial Corporation announced in August that it was taking over sponsorship of the tournament. For five years, the event was played at the Shoal Creek Golf and Country Club in the Shoal Creek development, southeast of Birmingham. The Tradition superseded the Regions Charity Classic, a regular Champions Tour event which began in 1992 as the Bruno's Memorial Classic. Shoal Creek previously hosted two PGA Championships, in 1984 and 1990.

Since moving to Alabama in 2011, the event has been played in May and June. It moved from Shoal Creek to the nearby Greystone Golf and Country Club in 2016, and is held on the recently renovated Founders Course.

== Winners ==
Year	Winner	Score	To par	Margin of victory	Runner(s)-up	Winner's share ($)	Venue
Regions Tradition
2026	(United States) Stewart Cink	270	−18	3 strokes	(Australia) Scott Hend	375,000	Greystone (Founders Course)
2025	(Argentina) Ángel Cabrera	268	−20	1 stroke	(United States) Jerry Kelly	375,000	Greystone (Founders Course)
2024	(United States) Doug Barron	271	−17	2 strokes	(New Zealand) Steven Alker	375,000	Greystone (Founders Course)
2023	(United States) Steve Stricker (3)	265	−23	6 strokes	(South Africa) Ernie Els (Sweden) Robert Karlsson	375,000	Greystone (Founders Course)
2022	(United States) Steve Stricker (2)	267	−21	6 strokes	(Republic of Ireland) Pádraig Harrington	375,000	Greystone (Founders Course)
2021	(Germany) Alex Čejka	270	−18	Playoff	(United States) Steve Stricker	375,000	Greystone (Founders Course)
2020	Canceled due to the COVID-19 pandemic						
2019	(United States) Steve Stricker	270	−18	6 strokes	(United States) Billy Andrade (United States) Paul Goydos (United States) David Toms	360,000	Greystone (Founders Course)
2018	(Spain) Miguel Ángel Jiménez	269	−19	3 strokes	(United States) Joe Durant (United States) Gene Sauers (United States) Steve Stricker	360,000	Greystone (Founders Course)
2017	(Germany) Bernhard Langer (2)	268	−20	5 strokes	(United States) Scott Parel (United States) Scott McCarron	345,000	Greystone (Founders Course)
2016	(Germany) Bernhard Langer	271	−17	6 strokes	(United States) Olin Browne	345,000	Greystone (Founders Course)
2015	(United States) Jeff Maggert	274	−14	Playoff	(United States) Kevin Sutherland	345,000	Shoal Creek
2014	(United States) Kenny Perry	281	−7	1 stroke	(United States) Mark Calcavecchia	330,000	Shoal Creek
2013	(South Africa) David Frost	272	−16	1 stroke	(United States) Fred Couples	335,000	Shoal Creek
2012	(United States) Tom Lehman (2)	274	−14	2 strokes	(Germany) Bernhard Langer (Taiwan) Lu Chien-soon	335,000	Shoal Creek
2011	(United States) Tom Lehman	275	−13	Playoff	(Australia) Peter Senior	330,000	Shoal Creek
JELD-WEN Tradition
2010	(United States) Fred Funk (2)	276	−12	1 stroke	(United States) Michael Allen (Taiwan) Lu Chien-soon	392,000	Crosswater
2009	(United States) Mike Reid	272	−16	Playoff	(United States) John Cook	392,000	Crosswater
2008	(United States) Fred Funk	269	−19	3 strokes	(United States) Mike Goodes	392,000	Crosswater
2007	(Republic of Ireland) Mark McNulty	272	−16	5 strokes	(United States) David Edwards	390,000	Crosswater
2006	(Argentina) Eduardo Romero	275	−13	Playoff	(United States) Lonnie Nielsen	375,000	The Reserve (South Course)
2005	(United States) Loren Roberts	273	−15	Playoff	(United States) Dana Quigley	375,000	The Reserve (South Course)
2004	(United States) Craig Stadler	275	−13	1 stroke	(United States) Allen Doyle (United States) Jerry Pate	345,000	The Reserve (South Course)
2003	(United States) Tom Watson	273	−15	1 stroke	(United States) Jim Ahern (United States) Tom Kite	330,000	The Reserve (South Course)
The Countrywide Tradition
2002	(United States) Jim Thorpe	277	−11	Playoff	(United States) John Jacobs	300,000	Superstition Mountain (Prospector Course)
2001	(United States) Doug Tewell	265	−23	9 strokes	(United States) Mike McCullough	255,000	Desert Mountain (Cochise Course)
2000	(United States) Tom Kite	280	−8	Playoff	(United States) Larry Nelson (United States) Tom Watson	240,000	Desert Mountain (Cochise Course)
The Tradition
1999	(Australia) Graham Marsh	136 (Note: Shortened to 36 holes due to snow.)	−8	3 strokes	(United States) Larry Nelson	225,000	Desert Mountain (Cochise Course)
1998	(United States) Gil Morgan (2)	276	−12	2 strokes	(United States) Tom Wargo	210,000	Desert Mountain (Cochise Course)
1997	(United States) Gil Morgan	266	−22	6 strokes	(Japan) Isao Aoki	180,000	Desert Mountain (Cochise Course)
1996	(United States) Jack Nicklaus (4)	272	−16	3 strokes	(United States) Hale Irwin	150,000	Desert Mountain (Cochise Course)
1995	(United States) Jack Nicklaus (3)	276	−12	Playoff	(Japan) Isao Aoki	150,000	Desert Mountain (Cochise Course)
1994	(United States) Raymond Floyd	271	−17	Playoff	(United States) Dale Douglass	127,500	Desert Mountain (Cochise Course)
1993	(United States) Tom Shaw	269	−19	1 stroke	(United States) Mike Hill	127,500	Desert Mountain (Cochise Course)
1992	(United States) Lee Trevino	274	−14	1 stroke	(United States) Jack Nicklaus	120,000	Desert Mountain (Cochise Course)
1991	(United States) Jack Nicklaus (2)	277	−11	1 stroke	(United States) Jim Colbert (United States) Jim Dent (United States) Phil Rodgers	120,000	Desert Mountain (Cochise Course)
1990	(United States) Jack Nicklaus	206 (Note: Shortened to 54 holes due to rain.)	−10	4 strokes	(South Africa) Gary Player	120,000	Desert Mountain (Cochise Course)
1989	(United States) Don Bies	275	−13	1 stroke	(South Africa) Gary Player	90,000	Desert Mountain (Cochise Course)

== Multiple winners ==
Through 2025, five men have multiple wins in the Tradition:

- 4 wins:
  - Jack Nicklaus: 1990, 1991, 1995, 1996
- 3 wins:
  - Steve Stricker: 2019, 2022, 2023
- 2 wins:
  - Gil Morgan: 1997, 1998
  - Fred Funk: 2008, 2010
  - Tom Lehman: 2011, 2012
  - Bernhard Langer: 2016, 2017
