= Sunriver Resort =

Luxury resort in Oregon

Coordinates: 43.87°N 121.45°W

Location in the United States

Sunriver Resort is a luxury resort and residential community in central Oregon, in the Pacific Northwest region of the United States. The resort is located at the edge of the high desert, just east of the Cascade Range, in Sunriver, 15 miles (24 km) south of Bend and 180 miles (290 km) south-southeast of Portland. The common areas throughout the Sunriver resort community are managed by the Sunriver Owners' Association. The elevation of the resort is 4,190 feet (1,280 m) above sea level.

== History ==
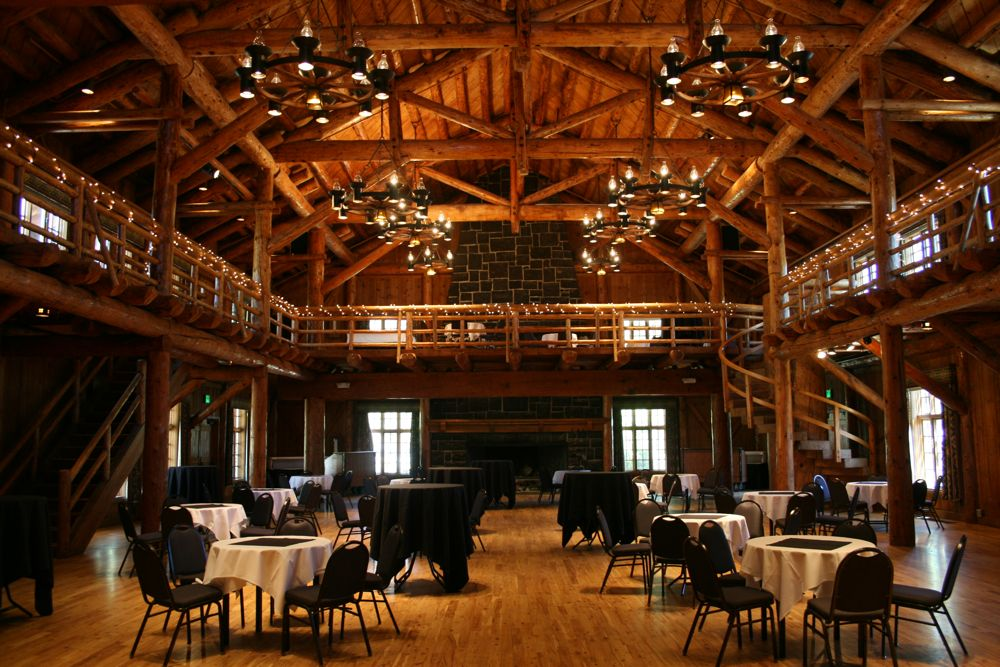
Former officers' mess at Camp Abbot, built 1943-1944 and today's "Great Hall"

Sunriver's land used to be a lake bed, which dried out and became a meadow. It was a meeting place for Native Americans living in the area and was later adopted by settlers, trappers, and explorers, including Peter Skene Ogden, Kit Carson, and John Fremont, who led expeditions along the Deschutes River in the early-to-mid-19th century. In 1943, the meadow was claimed as a training ground for combat construction battalions of the U.S. Army and was established as Camp Abbot. Construction was started on the camp in November 1942 and it officially opened when Colonel Frank S. Benson assumed command on May 12, 1943. It closed soon after D-Day in July 1944 and most of the buildings were razed. The officers' club, constructed from native logs and stones, was left standing and is now the "Great Hall," used for meetings and weddings. Following the war, the land returned to use as a cattle ranch until the mid-1960s.

In 1965, Donald V. McCallum (1918–1987), a Portland attorney, and John D. Gray (1919–2012), founder of Omark Industries, bought the land and planned to build a luxury resort on it. Their idea was to create a resort and residential community with a focus on maintaining the integrity of the environment, including creating a finite number of home sites. The first home site at Sunriver was sold on June 28, 1968, and ground was broken on the resort's lodge in mid-August, which opened in September 1969. The resort that McCallum and Gray established was bought in 1993 by Sunriver Resort Limited Partnership, who began an extensive capital improvement program.

== The Resort ==
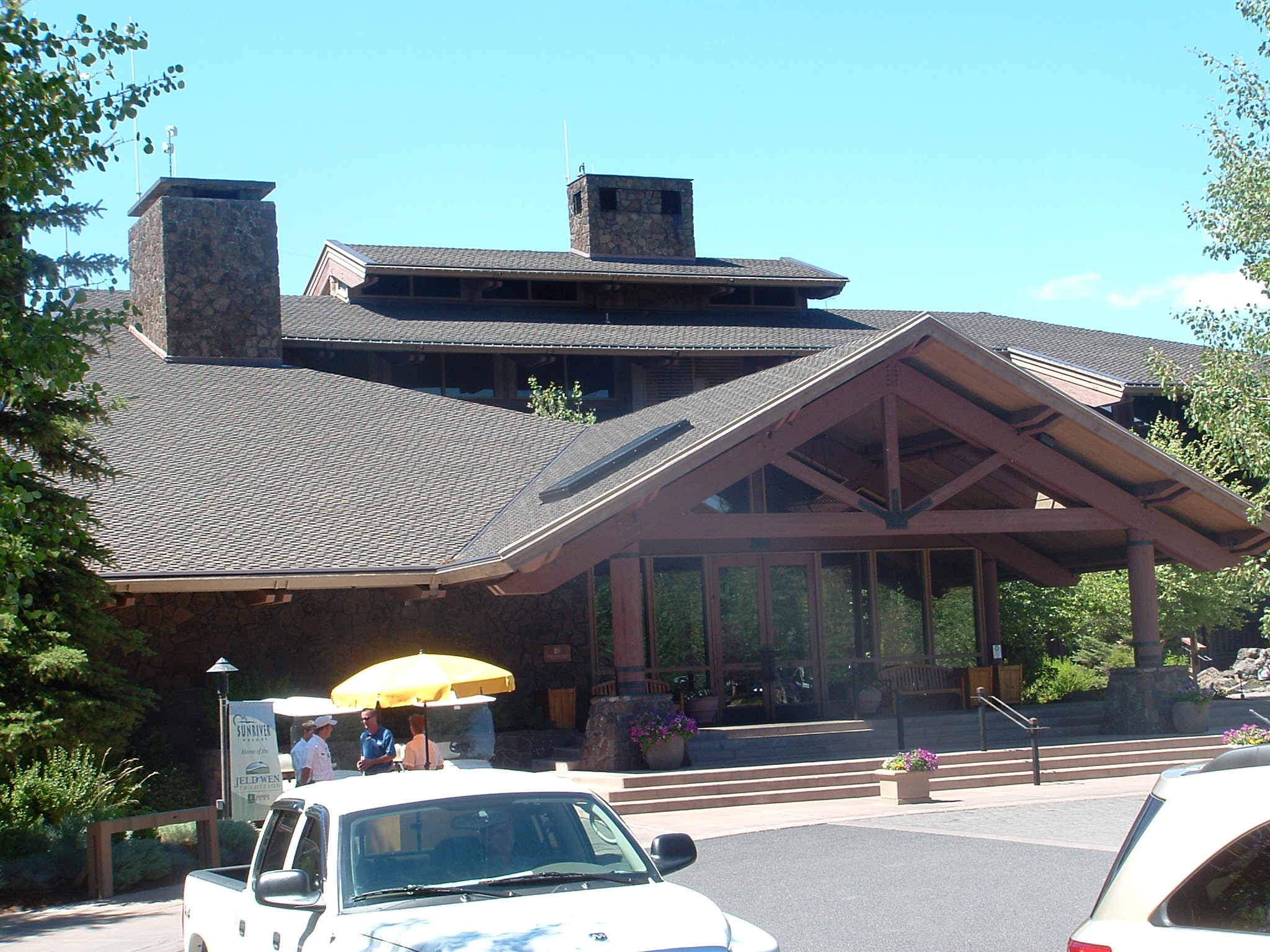
The Sunriver Lodge

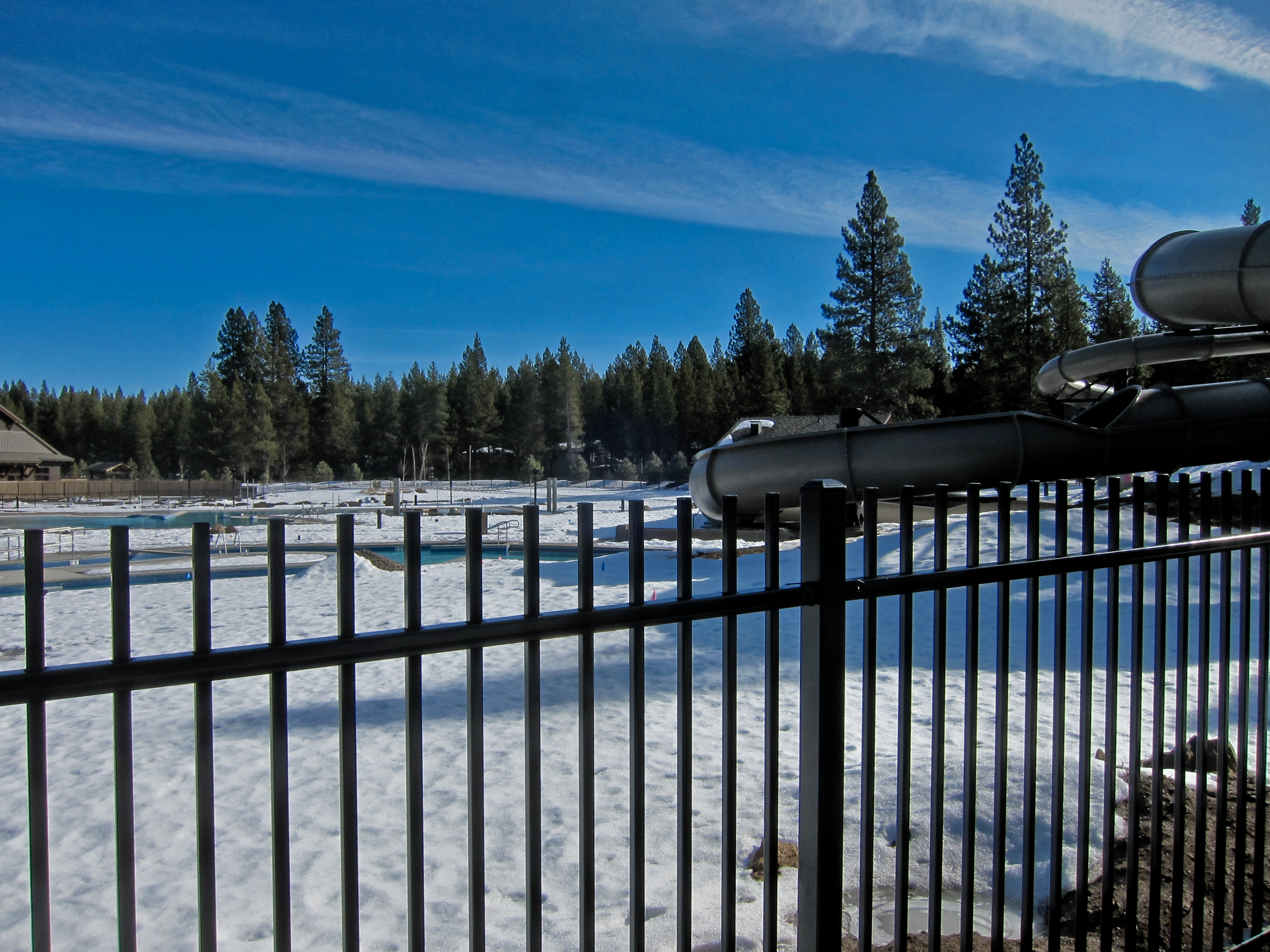
The Sunriver Homeowners' Aquatic and Recreation Center

Sunriver Resort offers a variety of accommodations, including luxury guest rooms and suites, as well as 400 vacation rental properties. It has five dining areas, three tennis facilities, family recreation, and is home to the Sage Springs Club and Spa. The resort has over 44,600 square feet (4,140 m^{2}) of meeting and banquet space.

The resort is home to three golf courses: Meadows, Woodlands, and Crosswater. Crosswater, named one of "America's 100 Greatest Courses" by Golf Digest, was the home of the JELD-WEN Tradition, a major championship on the Champions Tour from 2007 to 2010. The Meadows golf course was designed by acclaimed architect John Fought and the Woodlands golf course was designed by the renowned architect Robert Trent Jones Jr.

The region's primary winter attraction, Mount Bachelor ski area, is about 20 minutes away by vehicle.
