= Belle Foods =

Defunct American supermarket chain

Belle Foods, LLC

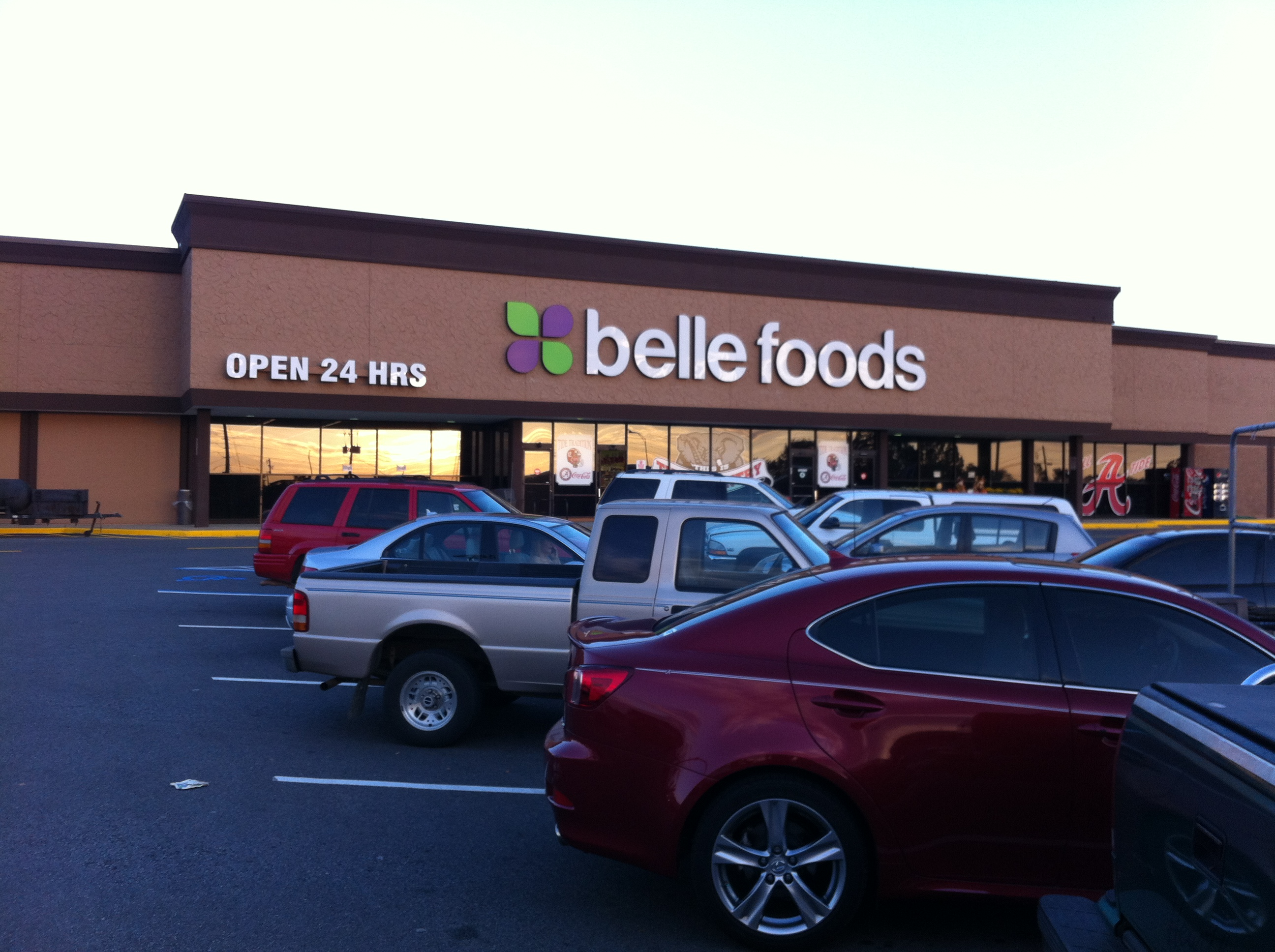
- A former Bruno's location in Tuscaloosa, Alabama, rebranded to Belle in 2012.
- Trade name: Belle Foods
- Company type: Private; family business
- Industry: Retail (Grocery)
- Founded: July 1, 2012; 13 years ago in Birmingham, Alabama, U.S.
- Founders: George Gilman; George Huntington Hartford
- Defunct: October 18, 2013; 12 years ago
- Fate: Chapter 11 bankruptcy Liquidation
- Headquarters: Birmingham, Alabama, U.S., US
- Number of locations: 57 (2013)
- Areas served: Alabama, Georgia, Florida & Mississippi
- Number of employees: 3,000 (2013)

Belle Foods, LLC was a family-owned chain of American supermarkets headquartered in Birmingham, Alabama. The company had a relatively short lifespan. It began operating its rebranded Bruno's and Food World and Piggly Wiggly Stores on July 1, 2012, but filed for bankruptcy just one year later. Before owners Bill White and Jeff White purchased the stores from Southern Family Markets in mid-2012, the 57-store grocery chain employed approximately 3,000 people.

Belle Foods filed for Chapter 11 bankruptcy on July 1, 2013, exactly one year after its founding. The company cited increased competition and higher payroll taxes as factors in its bankruptcy filing. In September 2013, Associated Wholesale Grocers was the only bidder (in a stalking horse bid) for Belle Foods stores being auctioned and offered $16.1 million.

Belle Foods was named "Retailer of the Year" in late 2012 by the Birmingham Business Journal. Its CEO, Bill White, was elected to the National Grocers Association's board of directors in February 2013.
