= Lavender Mountain =

Summit in Georgia, USA

Coordinates: 34.336°N 85.168°W

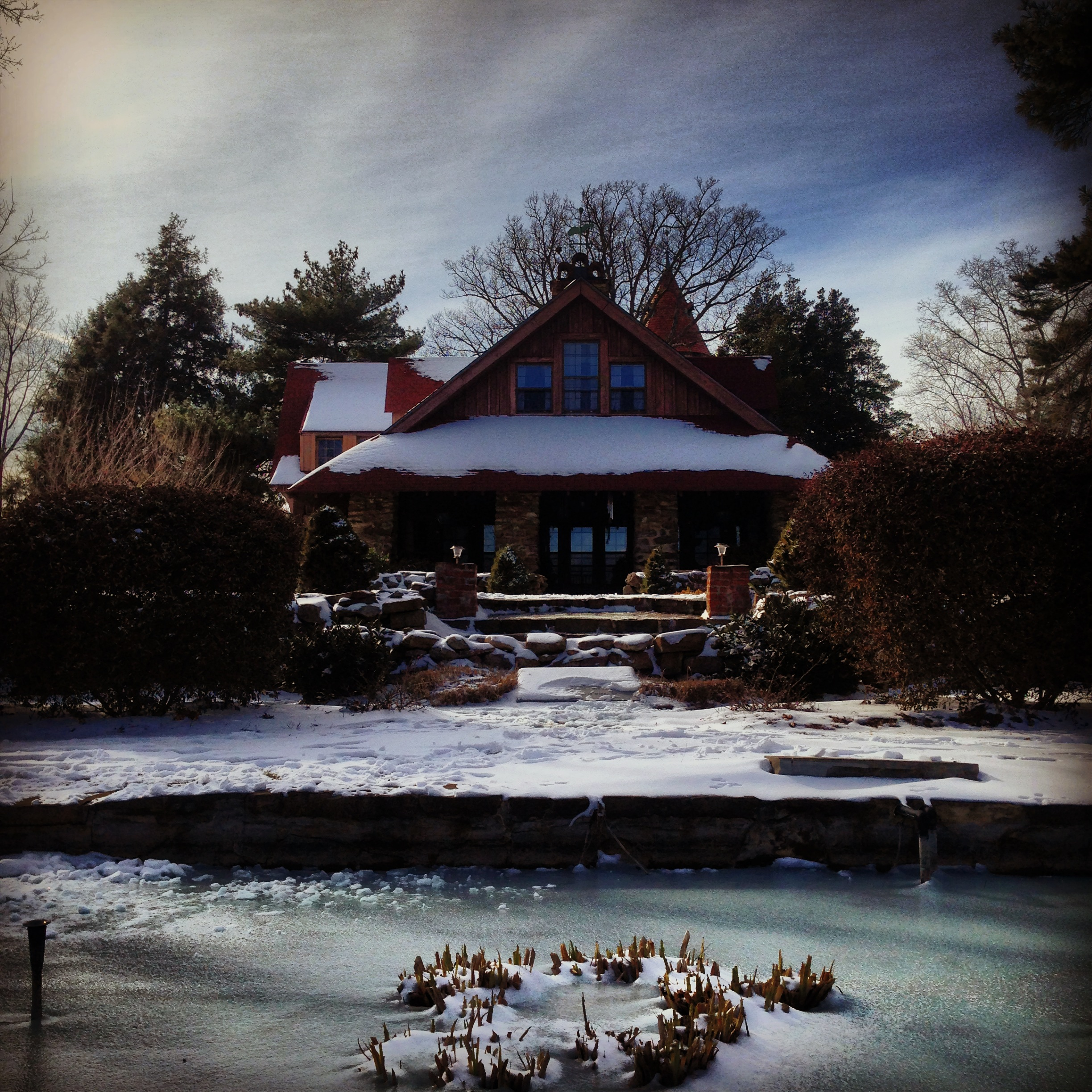
House o' Dreams on Lavender Mountain's summit

Lavender Mountain is a summit in the U.S. state of Georgia. The elevation is 1,526 feet (465 m).

Lavender Mountain was named after George Michael Lavender, a local merchant.
