= Oregon Observatory =

Observatory in Sunriver, Oregon, US

Sunriver Observatory
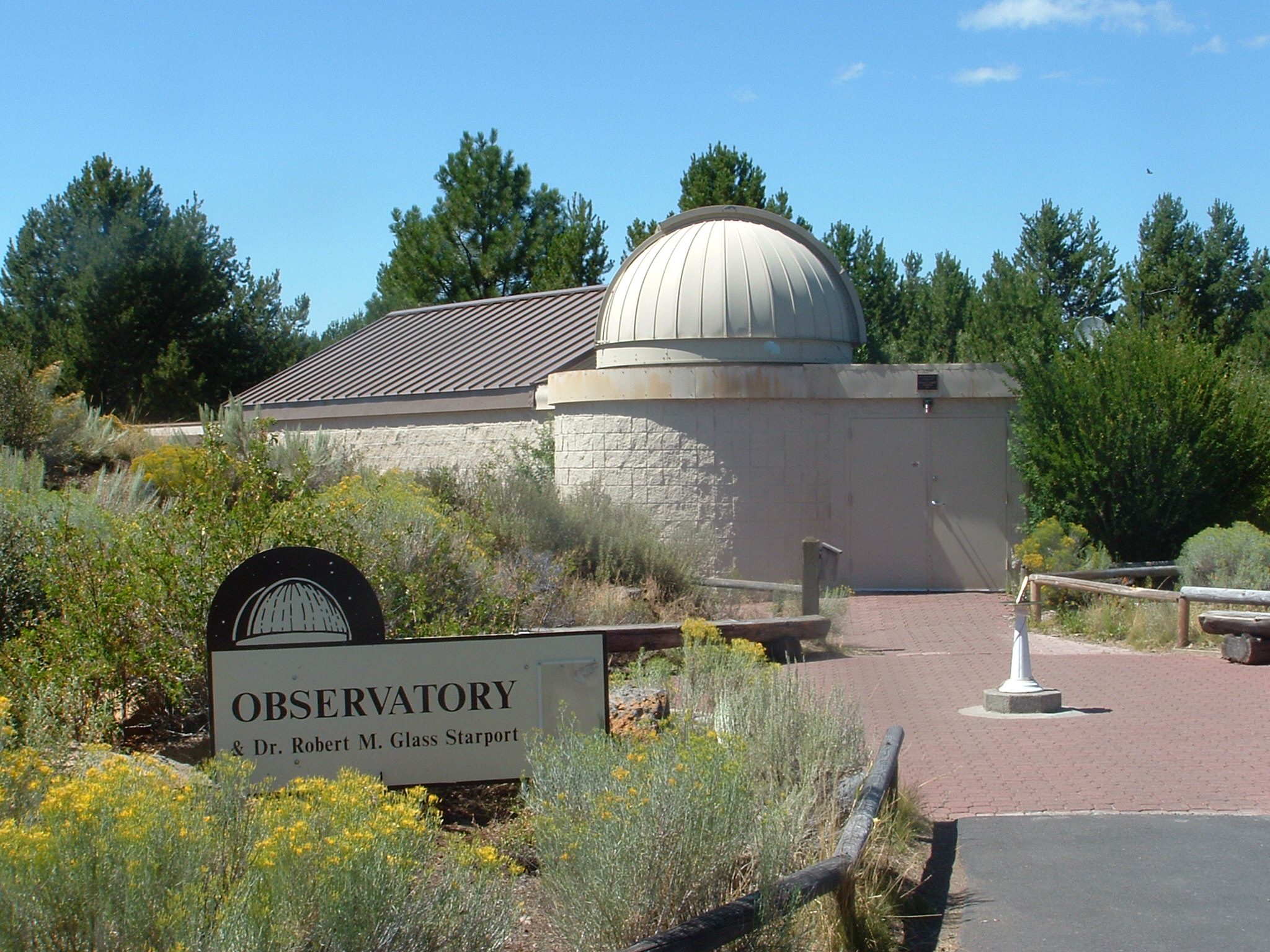
- Dr. Robert M. Glass Starport
- Organization: Sunriver Nature Center
- Location: Sunriver, Oregon, US
- Coordinates: 43.8851°N 121.4476°W
- Altitude: 1,269 m (4,163 ft)
- Established: c. 1990
- Website: snco.org/learn-explore/at-the-oregon-observatory/

Telescopes
- Yocum: 20-inch RC OGS
- Coronado: 90mm Halpha double stack
- Martin: JMI NGT 18" Newtonian
- Porter: Celestron 14" SC Fastar
- Porter: Celestron 11"
- Tryon: Tele Vue 102 plus 4 more solar telescopes, and 15 more night time telescopes

Oregon Observatory is an astronomical observatory operated by the not-for-profit Sunriver Nature Center & Observatory in Sunriver, Oregon, United States, near Sunriver Resort. As of 2011, the observatory had eleven telescopes, and by 2013, it had twenty-three telescopes with thirteen of them 10 inches (25 cm) or more. In July 2012, the observatory was renamed the Oregon Observatory at Sunriver. At that time attendance was approximately 10,000 visitors per year.

== See also ==
- List of astronomical observatories
