= Sunriver, Oregon =

Unincorporated community in the state of Oregon, United States

- Census-designated place
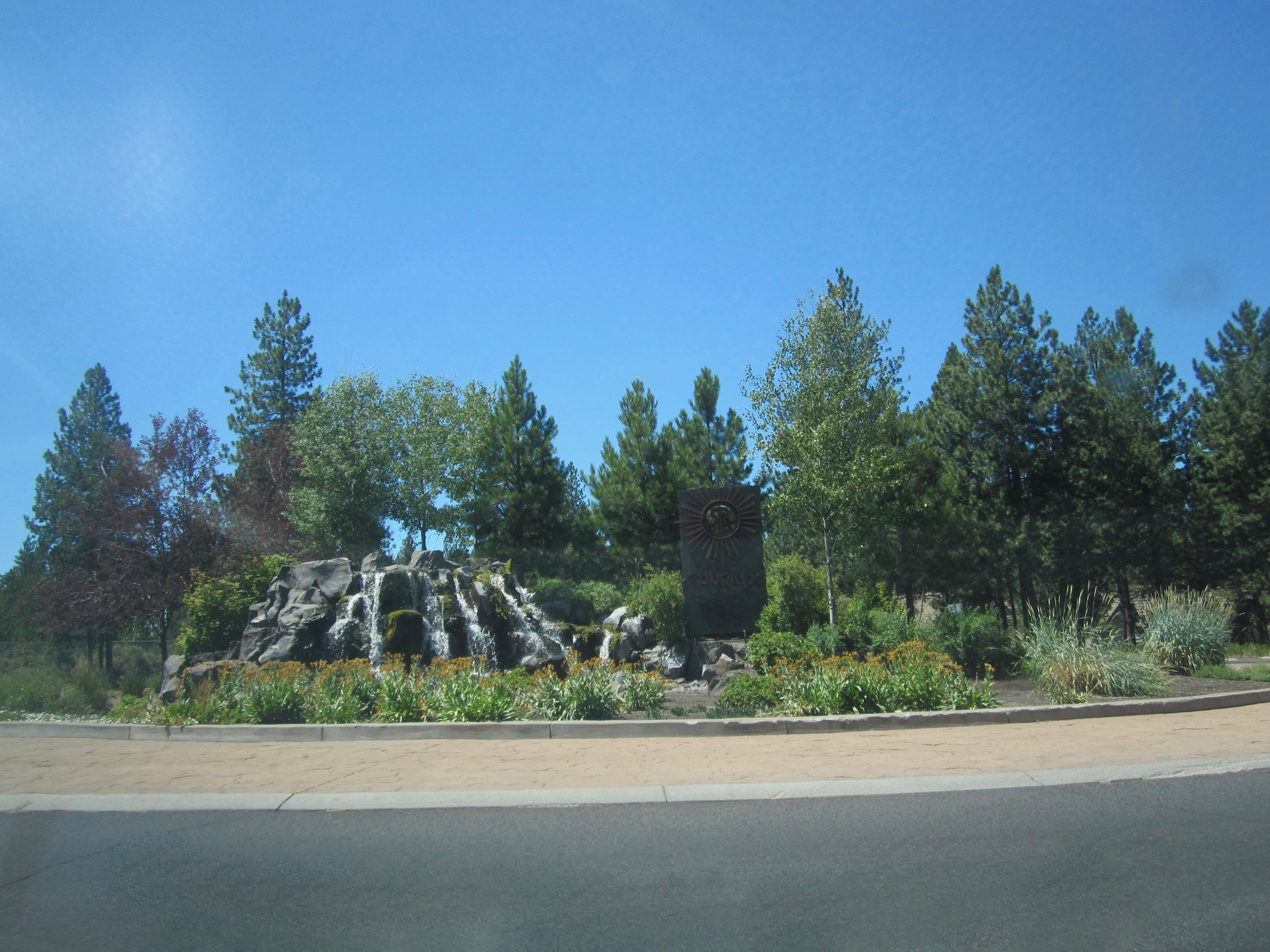
- Entrance to Sunriver in 2017

- Location within the United States Location within Oregon
- Coordinates: 43°52′24″N 121°26′18″W
- Country: United States
- State: Oregon
- County: Deschutes

Area
  - Total: 8.98 sq mi (23.27 km^{2})
  - Land: 8.85 sq mi (22.92 km^{2})
  - Water: 0.14 sq mi (0.36 km^{2})
- Elevation: 4,170 ft (1,270 m)

Population (2020)
  - Total: 2,023
  - Density: 228.6/sq mi (88.27/km^{2})
- Time zone: UTC−08:00 (PST)
  - Summer (DST): UTC−07:00 (PDT)
- ZIP Code: 97707
- Area codes: 458 and 541
- FIPS code: 41-71250
- GNIS feature ID: 2584426

Sunriver is a census-designated place and 3,300-acre (13 km^{2}) planned residential and resort community in Deschutes County, Oregon, United States. As of the 2020 census it had a population of 2,023, an increase from 1,393 in 2010. It is part of the Bend Metropolitan Statistical Area, located on the eastern side of the Deschutes River, about fifteen miles (25 km) south of Bend at the base of the Cascade Range.

Sunriver consists of residential homesites and common areas, recreational facilities, the Sunriver Resort and a commercial development known as The Village at Sunriver.

== History ==
Sunriver is located on the grounds of the former Camp Abbot, a World War II training facility designed to train combat engineers in a simulated combat environment. The U.S. Army camp opened in 1942, but by June 1944 the camp was abandoned and most of the settlement was razed.

The Officers' Club was spared; it has been preserved and renovated and is now known as the "Great Hall," under management of Sunriver Resort. The name "Sunriver" was selected by developers John Gray and Donald V. McCallum. The initial condominiums were built in 1968 in conjunction with the completion of Sunriver Lodge, and in 1969 the master plan was completed and developers began selling lots.

Sunriver was also the site of the pioneer Shonquest Ranch. Sunriver post office was established on July 18, 1969, at the same time as the public facilities were opened.

== Geography ==
=== Climate ===
This region experiences warm (but not hot) and dry summers, with no average monthly temperatures above 71.6 °F (22.0 °C). According to the Köppen Climate Classification system, Sunriver has a warm-summer Mediterranean climate, abbreviated "Csb" on climate maps.

Climate data for Sunriver, Oregon, 1991–2020 normals, 1998–2021 extremes: 4180ft (1274m)
Month	Jan	Feb	Mar	Apr	May	Jun	Jul	Aug	Sep	Oct	Nov	Dec	Year
Record high °F (°C)	62 (17)	66 (19)	78 (26)	84 (29)	93 (34)	101 (38)	102 (39)	101 (38)	102 (39)	89 (32)	72 (22)	64 (18)	102 (39)
Mean maximum °F (°C)	52.4 (11.3)	56.6 (13.7)	66.5 (19.2)	76.7 (24.8)	83.8 (28.8)	89.5 (31.9)	96.2 (35.7)	96.7 (35.9)	92.0 (33.3)	80.5 (26.9)	63.6 (17.6)	51.5 (10.8)	97.9 (36.6)
Mean daily maximum °F (°C)	39.8 (4.3)	43.1 (6.2)	49.7 (9.8)	56.6 (13.7)	64.7 (18.2)	72.0 (22.2)	84.1 (28.9)	83.1 (28.4)	75.8 (24.3)	61.9 (16.6)	46.3 (7.9)	37.5 (3.1)	59.5 (15.3)
Daily mean °F (°C)	29.7 (−1.3)	32.1 (0.1)	37.0 (2.8)	40.6 (4.8)	48.8 (9.3)	54.6 (12.6)	62.5 (16.9)	61.6 (16.4)	54.9 (12.7)	44.9 (7.2)	35.1 (1.7)	28.3 (−2.1)	44.2 (6.8)
Mean daily minimum °F (°C)	19.6 (−6.9)	21.1 (−6.1)	24.2 (−4.3)	24.6 (−4.1)	32.9 (0.5)	37.2 (2.9)	41.0 (5.0)	40.1 (4.5)	34.0 (1.1)	27.8 (−2.3)	24.0 (−4.4)	19.0 (−7.2)	28.8 (−1.8)
Mean minimum °F (°C)	2.0 (−16.7)	4.5 (−15.3)	10.5 (−11.9)	15.5 (−9.2)	20.2 (−6.6)	26.6 (−3.0)	31.5 (−0.3)	30.3 (−0.9)	23.0 (−5.0)	14.3 (−9.8)	6.0 (−14.4)	−2.8 (−19.3)	−7.4 (−21.9)
Record low °F (°C)	−15 (−26)	−16 (−27)	−3 (−19)	10 (−12)	11 (−12)	16 (−9)	19 (−7)	24 (−4)	12 (−11)	−8 (−22)	−8 (−22)	−27 (−33)	−27 (−33)
Average precipitation inches (mm)	2.86 (73)	1.91 (49)	1.54 (39)	1.16 (29)	1.71 (43)	1.09 (28)	0.52 (13)	0.55 (14)	0.75 (19)	1.44 (37)	2.43 (62)	3.16 (80)	19.12 (486)
Average snowfall inches (cm)	12.2 (31)	11.5 (29)	5.0 (13)	2.1 (5.3)	0.3 (0.76)	0.0 (0.0)	0.0 (0.0)	0.0 (0.0)	0.0 (0.0)	0.6 (1.5)	6.3 (16)	15.7 (40)	53.7 (136.56)
Source 1: NOAA
Source 2: XMACIS2 (records, monthly max/mins & 1999-2021 snow)

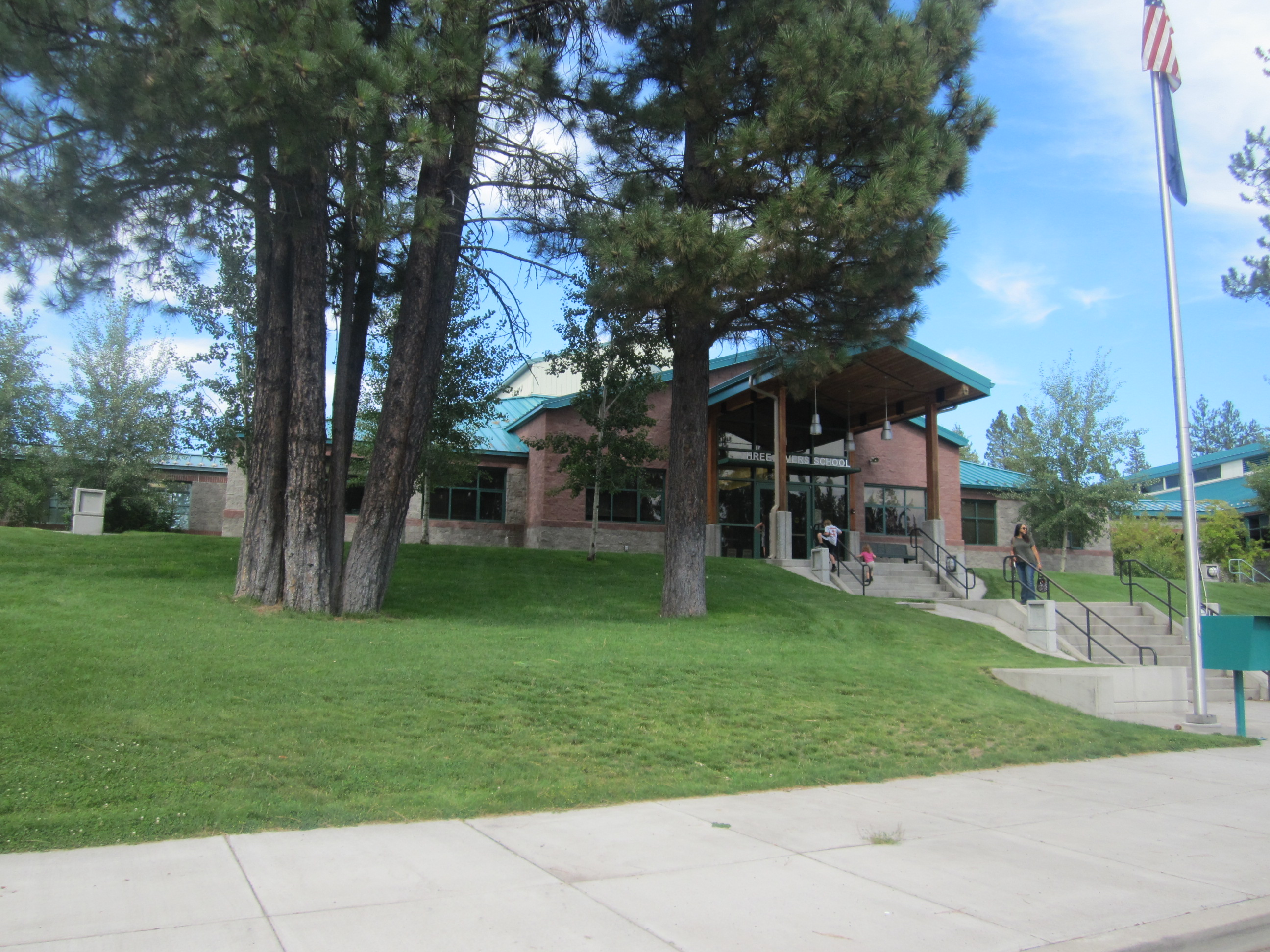
Three Rivers School in Sunriver

== Demographics ==
Historical population
Census	Pop.	Note	%±
1990	744		—
2000	1,393		87.2%
2010	1,393		0.0%
2020	2,023		45.2%
U.S. Decennial Census

== Education ==
It is in the Bend-La Pine School District. Zoned schools are:

- Three Rivers School
- Residents may choose between Caldera High School or La Pine High School.

Deschutes County is in the boundary of Central Oregon Community College.

Deschutes Public Library operates the Sunriver Library.

== See also ==
- Sunriver Airport
- Oregon Observatory
