= 2026 NCAA Division I women's golf championship =

2026 NCAA Division I Women's Golf Championship
Tournament information
- Dates: May 22–27, 2026
- Location: Carlsbad, California, U.S.
- Course(s): Omni La Costa Resort & Spa (University of Texas)
- Organized by: NCAA

Statistics
- Par: 72
- Length: 6,297 yards
- Field: 156 players, 30 teams

Champion
- Team: Stanford; Individual: Farah O'Keefe (Texas)
- Team: 4–1 vs USC; Individual: 276 (−12)

The 2026 NCAA Division I Women's Golf Championship was contested May 22–27 at Omni La Costa Resort & Spa in Carlsbad, California. It was the 43rd annual tournament to establish the national champions of the 2026 season in NCAA Division I women's collegiate golf. The tournament was hosted by the University of Texas. There were both team and individual championships.

It was the third and final year that the men's and women's Division I golf tournaments were played at the same location; the men's championship will be held in Carlsbad after the women's championship from May 29 – June 3.

Stanford won their fourth team title and Farah O'Keefe of Texas won the individual championship.

== Regional qualifying tournaments ==
- There were six regional sites that held the qualifying tournaments across the United States on May 11–13, 2026.
- The five lowest-scoring teams from each of the regional sites qualified to compete at the national championships as team and individual players.
- An additional individual with the lowest score in their regional, whose teams did not qualify, qualified to compete for the individual title in the national championship.

Regional	Golf course	Location	Qualified teams^	Additionally qualified
Ann Arbor	University of Michigan Golf Course	Ann Arbor, Michigan	1. Southern California; 2. Ohio State; 3. Duke; 4. Northwestern; 5. Texas Tech	Isabella McCauley, Minnesota
Chapel Hill	UNC Finley Golf Course	Chapel Hill, North Carolina	1. Texas; 2. North Carolina; 3. Oklahoma State; 4. Michigan State; 4. Virginia	Thanana Kotchasanmanee, Princeton
Louisville	University of Louisville Golf Club	Simpsonville, Kentucky	1. Auburn; 2. Houston; 3. Arkansas; 4. Iowa State; 4. Ole Miss	Sheridan Clancy, Indiana
Stanford	Stanford Golf Course	Stanford, California	1. Stanford; 2. Pepperdine; 3. Oregon State; 4. Arizona State; 5. Missouri	Emma Bunch, New Mexico State
Tallahassee	Seminole Legacy Golf Club	Tallahassee, Florida	1. Wake Forest; 2. Florida State; 3. Florida; 4. Eastern Michigan; 5. Kentucky	Johanna Sjursen, Louisiana–Monroe
Waco	Ridgewood Country Club	Waco, Texas	1. SMU; 2. Texas A&M; 3. Baylor; 4. LSU; 5. Tennessee	Kirstin Angosta, TCU

^ Teams listed in qualifying order.

== Venue ==
This is the third time the NCAA Division I Women's Golf Championship will be held at Omni La Costa Resort & Spa and the second time the tournament has been hosted by the University of Texas.

== Format ==
Similar to 2015 NCAA Division I Women's Golf Championship, all teams will compete for three days (54 holes) on a stroke-play basis from Friday until Sunday. On Monday, the lowest scoring player was awarded as the national champion for the individual title at the conclusion of the 72 holes stroke-play event. At the same time, the lowest scoring eight teams advanced to the match-play team event. The quarterfinals and semifinals of match-play event will be played on Tuesday, May 26 and the finals will be played on Wednesday, May 27.

== Team competition ==
=== Leaderboard ===
(Par: 288, Total: 1152)

Place	Team	Round 1	Round 2	Round 3	Round 4	Total	To par
1	Stanford	282	282	279	287	1130	−22
2	Southern California	281	286	281	295	1143	−9
T3	Arkansas	286	290	285	292	1153	+1
T3	Texas	288	290	280	295	1153	+1
5	Eastern Michigan	286	295	289	284	1154	+2
6	Oklahoma State	283	286	285	301	1155	+3
7	Duke	291	286	289	293	1159	+7
8	Pepperdine	296	289	287	291	1163	+11
9	Iowa State	284	292	285	303	1164	+12
10	Arizona State	289	292	285	299	1165	+13
11	Florida	297	285	284	302	1168	+16
T12	SMU	288	289	297	301	1175	+23
T12	Missouri	287	296	289	303	1175	+23
14	Northwestern	290	292	294	301	1177	+25
15	North Carolina	293	294	287	304	1178	+26

Eliminated teams: LSU (877), Wake Forest (877), Tennessee (879), Virginia (879), Houston (880), Auburn (881), Texas A&M (882), Florida State (885), Kentucky (885), Baylor (886), Ole Miss (887), Ohio State (893), Michigan State (895), Texas Tech (899), Oregon State (901)

=== Match-play bracket ===
- The eight teams with the lowest stroke play total advanced into the match-play event.

Quarterfinals; May 26, morning
1	Stanford	5
8	Pepperdine	0
4	Texas	1.5
5	Eastern Michigan	3.5
3	Arkansas	5
6	Oklahoma State	0
2	Southern California	3
7	Duke	2

Semifinals; May 26, afternoon
1	Stanford	5
5	Eastern Michigan	0
3	Arkansas	2
2	Southern California	3

Final; May 27
1	Stanford	4
2	Southern California	1

== Individual competition ==
May 25, 2026 (Par:72, Total: 288)

Place	Player	University	Score	To par
1	Farah O'Keefe	Texas	276	−12
2	Megha Ganne	Stanford	278	−10
3	Rianne Malixi	Duke	279	−9
4	Catherine Park	Southern California	280	−8
T5	María José Marín	Arkansas	281	−7
T5	Kyra Van Kan	Tennessee	281	−7
7	Ellie Bushnell	Oklahoma State	282	−6
T8	Kirstin Angosta	TCU	283	−5
T8	Marta Silchenko	Oklahoma State	283	−5
T8	Reagan Zibilski	Arkansas	283	−5

The remaining 86 players from the top 15 teams and the top 9 individuals outside of those teams competed for the individual championship title after the 54-hole cut.
