= 2016 NCAA Division I women's golf championship =

2016 NCAA Division I Women's Golf Championship
Tournament information
- Dates: May 20–25, 2016
- Location: Eugene, Oregon, U.S.
- Course(s): Eugene Country Club (University of Oregon)
- Organized by: NCAA

Statistics
- Par: 72
- Length: 6,369 yards
- Field: 132 players, 24 teams

Champion
- Team: Washington; Individual: Virginia Elena Carta (Duke)
- Team: 3–2 vs. Stanford; Individual: 272 (−16)

The 2016 NCAA Division I Women's Golf Championship was contested May 20–25 at Eugene Country Club in Eugene, Oregon. It was the 35th annual tournament to establish the national champions of the 2016 season in NCAA Division I women's collegiate golf. The tournament was hosted by the University of Oregon. There were both team and individual championships.

This was the second time, following the previous year, that the men's and women's Division I golf tournaments were played at the same location; the 2016 NCAA Division I Men's Golf Championship was held in Eugene after the women's championship from May 27 to June 1.

== Regional qualifying tournaments ==
- There were four regional sites that held the qualifying tournaments across the United States from May 5–7, 2016.
- The six lowest scoring teams from each of the regional sites qualified to compete at the national championships as team and individual players.
- An additional three individuals with the lowest score in their regional, whose teams did not qualify, qualified to compete for the individual title in the national championship.

Regional name	Location	Qualified teams^
Baton Rouge	Baton Rouge, Louisiana	Florida, South Carolina, Washington, Duke, Oregon, BYU
Bryan	Bryan, Texas	Georgia, Arizona, UCLA, Furman, Miami, Texas
Shoal Creek	Birmingham, Alabama	Northwestern, Florida State, Oklahoma State, Alabama, Tennessee, Michigan
Stanford	Stanford, California	Stanford, Southern California, Ohio State, North Carolina, Arkansas, Virginia

^ Teams listed in qualifying order.

== Venue ==
This was the second time the NCAA Division I Women's Golf Championship was held at Eugene Country Club, and the second time the tournament has been hosted by the University of Oregon.

== Format ==
Similar to 2015 NCAA Division I Women's Golf Championship, all teams competed for three days (54 holes) on a stroke-play basis from Friday until Sunday. On Monday, the lowest scoring player was awarded as the national champion for the individual title at the conclusion of the 72 holes stroke-play event. At the same time, the lowest scoring eight teams advanced to the match-play team event. The quarterfinals and semifinals of match-play event were played on Tuesday and the finals were played on Wednesday.

== Team competition ==
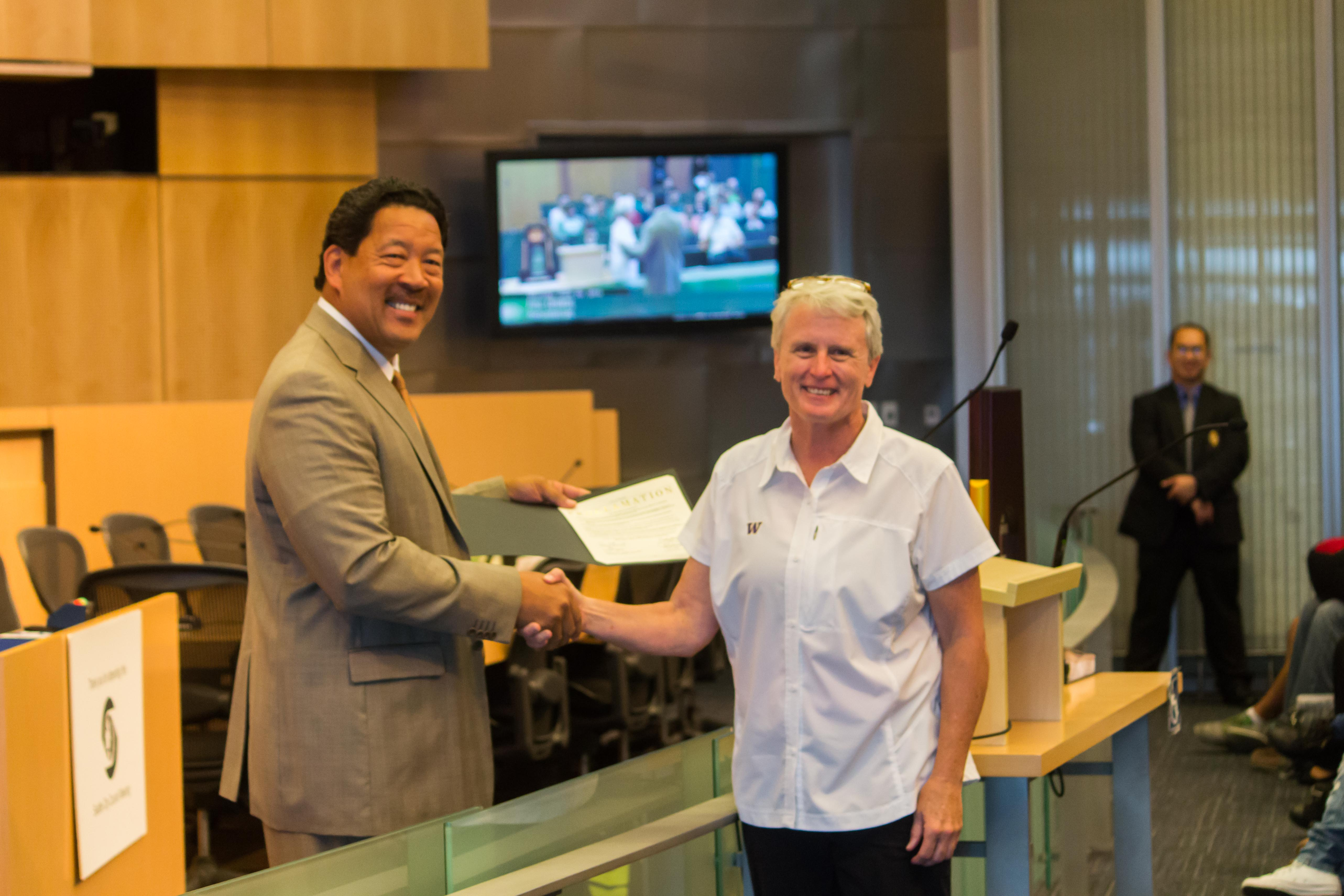
Seattle City Councilman Bruce Harrell congratulates University of Washington women's golf coach Mary Lou Mulfur

=== Leaderboard ===
(Par: 288, Total: 1152)

Place	Team	Round 1	Round 2	Round 3	Round 4	Total	To par
1	UCLA	286	291	285	282	1144	−8
2	Stanford	295	283	290	279	1147	−6
3	Southern California	289	280	291	290	1150	−3
4	Washington	289	285	292	286	1152	−1
5	Virginia	293	294	286	282	1155	+2
6	Duke	299	283	280	296	1158	+5
7	South Carolina	293	289	290	290	1162	+10
8	Oregon	297	282	291	296	1166	+14
T9	Northwestern	292	289	295	291	1167	+15
T9	Arizona	291	289	293	294	1167	+15
11	Oklahoma State	284	295	297	292	1168	+16
T12	Arkansas	292	291	298	292	1173	+21
T12	Alabama	300	292	290	291	1173	+21
14	North Carolina	298	292	291	294	1175	+23
15	Florida State	295	290	298	293	1176	+24

Remaining teams: Tennessee (885), Florida (886), Michigan (887), Georgia (887), Furman (888), Miami (890), Ohio State (892), Texas (897), Brigham Young (898).

- 15 out of 24 teams proceeded to the final round after finishing 54 holes.

=== Match-play bracket ===
- 8 of 15 teams with the lowest stroke play total will advance into the match-play event.

Quarterfinals; May 24, morning
1	UCLA	4
8	Oregon	1
4	Washington	3
5	Virginia	1
3	Southern California	1
6	Duke	4
2	Stanford	3
7	South Carolina	2

Semifinals; May 24, afternoon
1	UCLA	1
4	Washington	3
6	Duke	2
2	Stanford	3

Final; May 25
4	Washington	3
2	Stanford	2

== Individual competition ==
(Par:72, Total: 288)

Place	Player	University	Score	To par
1	Virginia Elena Carta	Duke	69-68-66-69 = 272	−16
T2	Haley Moore	Arizona	68-70-74-68 = 280	−8
T2	Dewi Weber	Miami	69-66-74-71 = 280	−8
T4	Cheyenne Knight	Alabama	69-69-71-73 = 282	−6
T4	Anna Newell	Tennessee	69-67-75-71 = 282	−6
T6	Lilia Vu	UCLA	73-72-72-67 = 283	−5
T6	Casey Danielson	Stanford	71-70-74-68 = 283	−5
T6	Jennifer Kupcho	Wake Forest	68-73-67-74 = 283	−5
9	Bronte Law	UCLA	71-72-69-72 = 284	−4
10	Tiffany Chan	Northwestern	71-71-74-70 = 286	−2

The remaining 84 players from the top 15 teams and the top 9 individuals outside of those teams competed for the individual championship title after the 54-hole cut.
