= 2018 NCAA Division I women's golf championship =

2018 NCAA Division I Women's Golf Championship
Tournament information
- Dates: May 18–23, 2018
- Location: Stillwater, Oklahoma, U.S.
- Course(s): Karsten Creek Golf Club (Oklahoma State University)
- Organized by: NCAA

Statistics
- Par: 72
- Length: 6,328 yards
- Field: 131 players, 24 teams

Champion
- Team: Arizona; Individual: Jennifer Kupcho (Wake Forest)
- Team: 3–2 vs. Alabama; Individual: 280 (−8)

The 2018 NCAA Division I Women's Golf Championship was contested May 18–23 at Karsten Creek Golf Club in Stillwater, Oklahoma. It was the 37th annual tournament to establish the national champions of the 2018 season in NCAA Division I women's collegiate golf. The tournament was hosted by the Oklahoma State University. There were both team and individual championships.

This was the fourth time, following the previous three years, that the men's and women's Division I golf tournaments were played at the same location; the 2018 NCAA Division I Men's Golf Championship was held in Stillwater after the women's championship from May 25–30.

== Regional qualifying tournaments ==
- There were four regional sites that held the qualifying tournaments across the United States from May 5–7, 2018.
- The six lowest scoring teams from each of the regional sites qualified to compete at the national championships as team and individual players.
- An additional three individuals with the lowest score in their regional, whose teams did not qualify, qualified to compete for the individual title in the national championship.

Regional name	Golf course	Location	Qualified teams^	Additionally qualified
Austin	University of Texas Golf Club	Austin, Texas	1. Arkansas; 2. Texas; 3. Auburn; 4. Florida; 5. Baylor; 6. Oklahoma	1. Maddie Szeryk, Texas A&M; 2. Rose Huang, BYU; 3. Leonie Harm, Houston
Madison	University Ridge Golf Course	Madison, Wisconsin	1. Duke; 2. Virginia; 3. Southern California; 4. Arizona State; 5. Ohio State; 6. Northwestern	1. Nicole Schroeder, Oregon State; 2. Gabby Curtis, Wisconsin; 3. Erin Harper, Indiana
San Francisco	TPC Harding Park	San Francisco, California	1. Stanford; 2. UCLA; 3. Ole Miss; 4. Louisville; 5. Kent State; 6. Colorado	1. Marthe Wold, California; 2. Hira Naveed, Pepperdine; 3. Emma Broze, Oklahoma State
Tallahassee	Don Veller Seminole Golf	Tallahassee, Florida	1. Alabama; 2. Florida State; 3. Furman; 4. Arizona; 5. Washington; 6. Wake Forest	1. Micheala Williams, Tennessee; 2. Jillian Hollis, Georgia; 3. Jess Yuen, Missouri

^ Teams listed in qualifying order.

== Venue ==
This was the third time the NCAA Division I Women's Golf Championship was held at Karsten Creek Golf Course, and the fourth time the tournament has been hosted by the Oklahoma State University.

== Format ==
Similar to 2015 NCAA Division I Women's Golf Championship, all teams competed for three days (54 holes) on a stroke-play basis from Friday until Sunday. On Monday, the lowest scoring player was awarded as the national champion for the individual title at the conclusion of the 72 holes stroke-play event. At the same time, the lowest scoring eight teams advanced to the match-play team event. The quarterfinals and semifinals of match-play event were played on Tuesday and the finals were played on Wednesday.

== Team competition ==
=== Leaderboard ===
(Par: 288, Total: 1152)

Place	Team	Round 1	Round 2	Round 3	Round 4	Total	To par
T1	UCLA	294	279	297	291	1161	+9
T1	Alabama	292	286	284	299	1161	+9
3	Southern California	291	298	296	286	1168	+16
4	Northwestern	299	293	290	291	1173	+21
5	Stanford	308	291	291	290	1180	+28
6	Duke	298	298	293	293	1182	+30
7	Kent State	296	299	296	293	1184	+32
T8	Arizona	301	291	288	305	1185	+33
T8	Baylor	313	295	287	290	1185	+33
10	Arkansas	308	300	289	289	1186	+34
11	Furman	312	293	294	289	1188	+36
T12	Washington	303	300	299	290	1192	+40
T12	Florida State	301	294	299	289	1192	+40
T12	Texas	309	300	291	292	1192	+40
15	Louisville	301	300	302	296	1199	+47

Remaining teams: Auburn (903), Arizona State (903), Wake Forest (903), Colorado (904), Oklahoma (905), Florida (909), Virginia (914), Ohio State (926), Ole Miss (928).

- 15 out of 24 teams proceeded to the final round after finishing 54 holes.

=== Match-play bracket ===
The 8 teams with the lowest stroke play total advanced into the match-play event.

Quarterfinals; May 22, morning
1	UCLA	2
8	Arizona	3
4	Northwestern	2
5	Stanford	3
3	USC	3
6	Duke	1
2	Alabama	4
7	Kent State	1

Semifinals; May 22, afternoon
8	Arizona	4
5	Stanford	1
3	USC	1
2	Alabama	3

Final; May 23
8	Arizona	3
2	Alabama	2

== Individual competition ==
(Par:72, Total: 288)

Place	Player	University	Score	To par
1	Jennifer Kupcho	Wake Forest	65-74-70-71=280	−8
T2	Andrea Lee	Stanford	77-69-71-65=282	−6
T2	Bianca Pagdanganan	Arizona	71-68-71-72=282	−6
4	Cheyenne Knight	Alabama	70-69-70-74=283	−5
T5	Morgane Métraux	Florida State	70-72-74-68=284	−4
T5	Jaclyn Lee	Ohio State	72-72-66-74=284	−4
T7	Gurleen Kaur	Baylor	79-71-69-68=287	−1
T7	Mariel Galdiano	UCLA	75-69-72-71=287	−1
T7	Kristen Gillman	Alabama	73-72-70-72=287	−1
T7	Lilia Vu	UCLA	72-68-75-72=287	−1
T7	Lauren Stephenson	Alabama	74-69-70-74=287	−1

The remaining 84 players from the top 15 teams and the top 9 individuals outside of those teams competed for the individual championship title after the 54-hole cut.
