= 2025 NCAA Division I women's golf championship =

2025 NCAA Division I Women's Golf Championship
Tournament information
- Dates: May 16–21, 2025
- Location: Carlsbad, California, U.S.
- Course(s): Omni La Costa Resort & Spa (University of Texas)
- Organized by: NCAA

Statistics
- Par: 72
- Length: 6,297 yards
- Field: 396 players, 72 teams

Champion
- Team: Northwestern; Individual: María José Marín (Arkansas)
- Team: 3–2 vs Stanford; Individual: 276 (–12)

The 2025 NCAA Division I Women's Golf Championship was contested May 16–21 at Omni La Costa Resort & Spa in Carlsbad, California. It was the 42nd annual tournament to establish the national champions of the 2024 season in NCAA Division I women's collegiate golf. The tournament was hosted by the University of Texas. There are both team and individual championships.

It was the second of three years that the men's and women's Division I golf tournaments are played at the same location; the 2025 NCAA Division I men's golf championship will be held in Carlsbad after the women's championship from May 23–28.

== Regional qualifying tournaments ==
- There are six regional sites that held the qualifying tournaments across the United States from May 5–7, 2025.
- The five lowest scoring teams from each of the regional sites qualified to compete at the national championships as team and individual players.
- An additional individual with the lowest score in their regional, whose teams did not qualify, qualified to compete for the individual title in the national championship.

Regional name	Golf course	Location	Qualified teams^	Additionally qualified
Charlottesville	Birdwood Golf Course	Charlottesville, Virginia	1. South Carolina; 2. Ole Miss; T3. Virginia; T3. Florida; 5. UCLA	Pimchompoo Chaisilprungruang, Charlotte
Columbus	Ohio State University Golf Club; Scarlet Course	Columbus, Ohio	1. Kansas; 2. Arkansas; 3. Ohio State; 4. UNLV; 5. LSU	Vanessa Zhang, Harvard
Gold Canyon	Superstition Mountain Golf and Country Club	Gold Canyon, Arizona	1. Oregon; 2. Arizona State; 3. Oklahoma State; 4. Mississippi State; 5. Cal State Fullerton	Janae Leovao, Long Beach State
Lexington	University Club of Kentucky	Lexington, Kentucky	1. Florida State; T2. Georgia Southern; T2. Kansas State; 4. Southern California; 5. Vanderbilt	Caroline Smith, Indiana
Lubbock	The Rawls Course	Lubbock, Texas	1. Wake Forest; 2. Texas; 3. Iowa State; 4. Tennessee; 5. Purdue	Kara Kaneshiro, Colorado State
Norman	Jimmie Austin OU Golf Club	Norman, Oklahoma	1. Stanford; 2. Northwestern; 3. Michigan State; 4. Oklahoma; 5. Baylor	Grace Jin, Sam Houston

^ Teams listed in qualifying order.

== Venue ==
This is the second time the NCAA Division I Women's Golf Championship will be held at Omni La Costa Resort & Spa and the second time the tournament has been hosted by the University of Texas.

== Format ==
Similar to 2015 NCAA Division I Women's Golf Championship, all teams competed for three days (54 holes) on a stroke-play basis from Friday until Sunday. On Monday, the lowest scoring player was awarded as the national champion for the individual title at the conclusion of the 72 holes stroke-play event. At the same time, the lowest scoring eight teams advanced to the match-play team event. The quarterfinals and semifinals of match-play event were played on Tuesday, May 20 and the finals were played on Wednesday, May 21.

== Team competition ==
=== Leaderboard ===
(Par: 288, Total: 1152)

Place	Team	Round 1	Round 2	Round 3	Round 4	Total	To par
1	Stanford	293	278	270	274	1115	−27
2	Oregon	288	289	285	284	1146	−6
3	Northwestern	291	285	280	298	1154	+2
4	Florida State	295	284	288	288	1155	+3
5	Southern California	292	287	285	292	1156	+4
6	Arkansas	297	290	280	291	1158	+6
7	Texas	288	293	288	291	1160	+8
8	Virginia	294	293	289	291	1167	+15
9	Arizona State	288	294	293	293	1168	+16
T10	South Carolina	297	286	289	297	1169	+17
T10	LSU	293	297	290	289	1169	+17
12	UCLA	295	294	293	289	1171	+19
13	Tennessee	291	297	288	297	1173	+21
14	Mississippi State	294	286	302	296	1178	+26
15	Oklahoma State	284	297	297	302	1180	+28

Eliminated teams: Vanderbilt (884), Florida (885), Michigan State (888), Kansas State (890), Ole Miss (893), Wake Forest (890), Kansas (895), Iowa State (896), Oklahoma (896), Georgia Southern (900), Ohio State (900), Purdue (906), Cal State Fullerton (910), UNLV (910), Baylor (911) Source:

=== Match-play bracket ===
- The eight teams with the lowest stroke play total advanced into the match-play event.

Quarterfinals; May 20, morning
1	Stanford	3
8	Virginia	1
4	Florida State	3
5	Southern California	1
3	Northwestern	3
6	Arkansas	2
2	Oregon	3
7	Texas	2

Semifinals; May 20, afternoon
1	Stanford	3
4	Florida State	1
3	Northwestern	3
2	Oregon	2

Final; May 21
1	Stanford	2
3	Northwestern	3

== Individual competition ==
May 21, 2025 (Par:72, Total: 288)

Place	Player	University	Score	To par
1	María José Marín	Arkansas	276	−12
2	Mirabel Ting	Florida State	278	−10
3	Kelly Xu	Stanford	280	−8
4	Paula Martín Sampedro	Stanford	281	−7
T5	Catherine Park	Southern California	282	−6
T5	Megan Propeck	Virginia	282	−6
T5	Eila Galitsky	South Carolina	282	−6
T8	Lottie Woad	Florida State	283	−5
T8	Kiara Romero	Oregon	283	−5
10	Avery Weed	Mississippi State	284	−4
10	Megha Ganne	Stanford	284	−4
10	Suvichaya Vinijchaitham	Oregon	284	−4
10	Meja Örtengren	Stanford	284	−4

The remaining 86 players from the top 15 teams and the top 9 individuals outside of those teams competed for the individual championship title after the 54-hole cut.
