= 2006 NCAA Division I women's golf championship =

2006 NCAA Division I Women's Golf Championship
Tournament information
- Location: Columbus, Ohio, U.S. 40.031886°N 83.0523498°W
- Course: Ohio State University Golf Club

Statistics
- Par: 72 (288)
- Field: 24 teams

Champion
- Team: Duke (4th title); Individual: Dewi Schreefel, USC
- Team: 1,167 (−10); Individual: 286 (−2)

Location map
- Location in the United States Location in Ohio

The 2006 NCAA Division I Women's Golf Championships were contested at the 25th annual NCAA-sanctioned golf tournament to determine the individual and team national champions of women's Division I collegiate golf in the United States.

The tournament was held at the Ohio State University Golf Club in Columbus, Ohio.

Defending champions Duke again won the team championship, the Blue Devils' fourth.

Dewi Schreefel, from USC, won the individual title.

== Qualification ==
- Three regional qualifying tournaments were held across the United States from May 11–13, 2006.
- The eight teams with the lowest team scores qualified from each regional tournament.

Regional	Location	Regional champion(s)	Other qualifiers^
East	Greensboro, North Carolina; Bryan Park Golf Course	Tennessee	
East	Greensboro, North Carolina; Bryan Park Golf Course	Tennessee	LSU
East	Greensboro, North Carolina; Bryan Park Golf Course	Tennessee	California
East	Greensboro, North Carolina; Bryan Park Golf Course	Tennessee	Arizona State
East	Greensboro, North Carolina; Bryan Park Golf Course	Tennessee	Florida State
East	Greensboro, North Carolina; Bryan Park Golf Course	Tennessee	Auburn
East	Greensboro, North Carolina; Bryan Park Golf Course	Tennessee	Wake Forest
East	Greensboro, North Carolina; Bryan Park Golf Course	Tennessee	Alabama
Central	Bryan, Texas; The Traditions Golf Course	USC	
Central	Bryan, Texas; The Traditions Golf Course	USC	Duke
Central	Bryan, Texas; The Traditions Golf Course	USC	Pepperdine
Central	Bryan, Texas; The Traditions Golf Course	USC	Florida
Central	Bryan, Texas; The Traditions Golf Course	USC	Oklahoma State
Central	Bryan, Texas; The Traditions Golf Course	USC	Kent State
Central	Bryan, Texas; The Traditions Golf Course	USC	Texas A&M
Central	Bryan, Texas; The Traditions Golf Course	USC	Nebraska
West	Redmond, Washington; Washington National Golf Course	Purdue	
West	Redmond, Washington; Washington National Golf Course	Purdue	UCLA
West	Redmond, Washington; Washington National Golf Course	Purdue	Washington
West	Redmond, Washington; Washington National Golf Course	Purdue	Stanford
West	Redmond, Washington; Washington National Golf Course	Purdue	Georgia
West	Redmond, Washington; Washington National Golf Course	Purdue	UNLV
West	Redmond, Washington; Washington National Golf Course	Purdue	Arizona
West	Redmond, Washington; Washington National Golf Course	Purdue	Arkansas

- ^ = Teams listed in qualifying order.

== Results ==
=== Individual champion ===
- Dewi Schreefel, USC (286, −2)

=== Team leaderboard ===
Rank	Team	Score
1	Duke (DC)	1,167
2	USC	1,177
3	Pepperdine	1,187
4	Arizona State	1,195
5	California	1,200
T6	Florida	1,202
T6	Georgia	1,202
T6	Washington	1,202
9	Purdue	1,203
10	Arkansas	1,205
11	UCLA	1,207
12	Auburn	1,208
T13	Stanford	1,209
T13	Tennessee	1,209
15	Wake Forest	1,211
16	Florida State	1,213
17	Arizona	1,216
18	Oklahoma State	1,217
19	Texas A&M	1,219
20	Nebraska	1,221
21	Kent State	1,229
22	UNLV	1,230
23	LSU	1,232
24	Alabama	1,248

- DC = Defending champion
