= 2005 NCAA Division I women's golf championship =

2005 NCAA Division I Women's Golf Championship
Tournament information
- Location: Sunriver, Oregon, U.S. 43.87°N 121.45°W
- Courses: Sunriver Resort; Meadow Course

Statistics
- Par: 71 (284)
- Field: 24 teams

Champion
- Team: Duke (3rd title); Individual: Anna Grzebien, Duke
- Team: 1,170 (−5); Individual: 286 (+2)
- Location in the United States Location in Oregon

The 2005 NCAA Division I Women's Golf Championships were contested at the 24th annual NCAA-sanctioned golf tournament to determine the individual and team national champions of women's Division I collegiate golf in the United States.

The tournament was held at the Meadow Course at the Sunriver Resort in Sunriver, Oregon.

Duke won the team championship, the Blue Devils' third and first since 2002.

Anna Grzebien, also from Duke, won the individual title.

== Qualification ==
- Three regional qualifying tournaments were held across the United States from May 5–7, 2005.
- The eight teams with the lowest team scores qualified from each of the regional tournaments.

Regional	Location	Regional champion(s)	Other qualifiers
East	Gainesville, Florida; University Golf Course	Ohio State	Duke; Furman; Pepperdine; Virginia; Tulane; Florida; Washington
Central	Lubbock, Texas; The Rawls Course	Auburn	Texas A&M; Missouri; Arizona State; Purdue; Tulsa; Michigan State; Arkansas
West	Las Cruces, New Mexico; New Mexico State Golf Club	Tennessee; UCLA	California; USC; Oklahoma State; BYU; UC Irvine; Stanford

^ Teams listed in qualifying order.

== Results ==
=== Individual champion ===
- Anna Grzebien, Duke (286, +2)

=== Team leaderboard ===
Rank	Team	Score
1	Duke	1,170
2	UCLA (DC)	1,175
3	Auburn	1,176
4	Pepperdine	1,179
5	California	1,180
T6	Ohio State	1,187
T6	Tennessee	1,187
T8	Arizona State	1,190
T8	Oklahoma State	1,190
10	Florida	1,195
T11	Arkansas	1,197
T11	USC	1,197
13	Virginia	1,200
14	Washington	1,201
15	Tulane	1,202
16	Missouri	1,205
17	Michigan State	1,206
18	UC Irvine	1,211
19	Stanford	1,212
20	Purdue	1,216
21	Furman	1,217
22	Texas A&M	1,219
23	Tulsa	1,222
24	BYU	1,238

- DC = Defending champion
- Debut appearance
