= 2024 NCAA Division I women's golf championship =

2024 NCAA Division I Women's Golf Championship
Tournament information
- Dates: May 17–22, 2024
- Location: Carlsbad, California, U.S.
- Course(s): Omni La Costa Resort & Spa (University of Texas)
- Organized by: NCAA

Statistics
- Par: 72
- Length: 6,297 yards
- Field: 167 players, 30 teams

Champion
- Team: Stanford; Individual: Adéla Cernousek (Texas A&M)
- Team: 3–2 vs UCLA; Individual: 276 (–12)

The 2024 NCAA Division I Women's Golf Championship will be contested May 17–22 at Omni La Costa Resort & Spa in Carlsbad, California. It will be the 42nd annual tournament to establish the national champions of the 2024 season in NCAA Division I women's collegiate golf. The tournament will be hosted by the University of Texas. There are both team and individual championships.

It will be the first of three years that the men's and women's Division I golf tournaments are played at the same location; the 2024 NCAA Division I men's golf championship will be held in Carlsbad after the women's championship from May 24–29.

== Regional qualifying tournaments ==
- There are six regional sites that held the qualifying tournaments across the United States from May 6–8, 2024.
- The five lowest scoring teams from each of the regional sites qualified to compete at the national championships as team and individual players.
- An additional individual with the lowest score in their regional, whose teams did not qualify, qualified to compete for the individual title in the national championship.

Regional name	Golf course	Location	Qualified teams^	Additionally qualified
Auburn	Auburn University Club	Auburn, AL	1. Auburn; 2. Oregon; 3. North Carolina; T4. South Carolina; T4. Tulsa	Isabella McCauley, Minnesota
Bermuda Run	Bermuda Run Country Club	Bermuda Run, NC	1. Ole Miss; 2. Texas; 3. Wake Forest; 4. Mississippi State; 5. Oregon State	Bailey Davis, Tennessee
Bryan	The Traditions Club	Bryan, TX	1. LSU; T2. Clemson; T2. SMU; 4. Vanderbilt; 5. Texas A&M	Carla Bernat, Kansas State
Cle Elum	Tumble Creek Club	Cle Elum, WA	1. Stanford; 2. Duke; 3. Virginia; 4. Arizona State; 5. San Jose State	Jasmine Leovao, Long Beach State
East Lansing	Forest Akers Golf Course	East Lansing, MI	1. USC; 2. Oklahoma State; 3. Michigan State; 4. Northwestern; 5. Pepperdine	Lauren Beaudreau, Notre Dame
Las Vegas	Spanish Trail Country Club	Las Vegas, NV	1. Arkansas; 2. Purdue; 3. Baylor; 4. UCLA; 5. Florida State	Veronika Kedronova, Kent State

^ Teams listed in qualifying order.

== Venue ==
This is the first time the NCAA Division I Women's Golf Championship will be held at Omni La Costa Resort & Spa and the first time the tournament has been hosted by the University of Texas.

== Format ==
Similar to 2015 NCAA Division I Women's Golf Championship, all teams will compete for three days (54 holes) on a stroke-play basis from Friday until Sunday. On Monday, the lowest scoring player was awarded as the national champion for the individual title at the conclusion of the 72 holes stroke-play event. At the same time, the lowest scoring eight teams advanced to the match-play team event. The quarterfinals and semifinals of match-play event will be played on Tuesday, May 21 and the finals will be played on Wednesday, May 22.

== Team competition ==
=== Leaderboard ===
(Par: 288, Total: 1152)

Place	Team	Round 1	Round 2	Round 3	Round 4	Total	To par
T1	Stanford	285	285	285	299	1154	+2
T1	LSU	289	286	288	291	1154	+2
3	Texas A&M	281	284	289	303	1157	+5
4	USC	299	283	296	287	1165	+13
5	Clemson	280	293	293	304	1170	+18
T6	UCLA	291	283	300	297	1171	+19
T6	Oregon	294	283	299	295	1171	+19
8	Auburn	285	290	301	296	1172	+20
9	Wake Forest	295	292	297	290	1174	+22
10	Arkansas	288	290	299	300	1177	+25
T11	Texas	299	286	302	295	1182	+30
T11	Florida State	287	302	300	293	1182	+30
T11	Northwestern	285	293	295	309	1182	+30
14	Duke	286	293	304	301	1184	+32
15	Mississippi State	287	297	301	301	1186	+34

Eliminated teams: Arizona State (890), Michigan State (892), San Jose State (892), Pepperdine (893), Vanderbilt (897), Baylor (899), Oregon State (900), South Carolina (904), SMU (912), Oklahoma State (912), Tulsa (913), North Carolina (913), Virginia (914), Purdue (916), Ole Miss (917)

- The top 15 teams after 54 holes proceeded to the final round.

=== Match-play bracket ===
- The eight teams with the lowest stroke play total advanced into the match-play event.

Quarterfinals; May 21, morning
1	Stanford	3
8	Auburn	0
4	USC	3
5	Clemson	1
3	Texas A&M	0
6	UCLA	3
2	LSU	2
7	Oregon	3

Semifinals; May 21, afternoon
1	Stanford	3
4	USC	1
6	UCLA	3
7	Oregon	1

Final; May 22
1	Stanford	3
6	UCLA	2

== Individual competition ==
May 20, 2024 (Par:72, Total: 288)

Place	Player	University	Score	To par
1	Adéla Cernousek	Texas A&M	276	–12
2	Lottie Woad	Florida State	279	–9
3	Paula Martín Sampedro	Stanford	282	–6
T4	Aine Donegan	LSU	283	–5
T4	María José Marín	Arkansas	283	–5
6	Kiara Romero	Oregon	284	–4
7	Annabelle Pancake	Clemson	285	–3
8	Julia López Ramirez	Mississippi State	286	–2
9	Carla Tejedo Mulet	LSU	287	–1
T10	Phoebe Brinker	Duke	288	E
T10	Zoe Campos	UCLA	288	E
T10	Megha Ganne	Stanford	288	E
T10	Mimi Rhodes	Wake Forest	288	E
T10	Latanna Stone	LSU	288	E

The remaining 86 players from the top 15 teams and the top 9 individuals outside of those teams competed for the individual championship title after the 54-hole cut.
