= Texas A&M Aggies women's golf =

College golf program

Texas A&M Women's Golf
- Founded: 1975
- University: Texas A&M University
- Conference: SEC
- Athletic director: Trev Alberts
- Head coach: Gerrod Chadwell (4th season)
- Location: College Station, Texas
- Course: Traditions Club; Par: 72; Yards: 7,250
- Nickname: Aggies
- Colors: Maroon and White

NCAA individual champions
- Adéla Cernousek (2024)

NCAA match play
- 2022, 2023, 2024

NCAA Championship appearances
- 1982, 1984, 1985, 1997, 2004, 2005, 2006, 2008, 2010, 2011, 2012, 2014, 2015, 2022, 2023, 2024, 2026

Conference champions
- SWC; 1985 Big 12; 1998, 2006, 2007, 2010 SEC; 2015, 2023

Individual conference champions
- SWC; Patricia Gonzalez (1985); Jenny Turner (1993); Jamie Hullett (1995 T); Isabelle Rosberg (1995 T) Big 12; Isabelle Rosberg (1998); Ashley Knoll (2006); Ashley Freeman (2009); Mary Michael Maggio (2012) SEC; Bianca Fabrizo (2015)

The Texas A&M Aggies women's golf team represents Texas A&M University in the NCAA Division I intercollegiate women's golf competition. The Aggies compete in the Southeastern Conference (SEC).

Texas A&M has won seven Conference Team Championships as well as nine individual conference championships. One Aggie has won the NCAA individual championships – Adéla Cernousek in 2024.

== Head coach ==
#	Coach	Years	Seasons	Conference championships	National champions
1	Kitty Holley	1975–1992	18	1	0
2	Jeanne Sutherland	1992–2007	15	3	0
3	Trelle McCombs	2007–2018	11	2	0
4	Andrea Gaston	2018–2021	3	0	0
4	Gerrod Chadwell	2021–Present	5	1	0
Total			52	9	0

== Yearly record ==
Legend
Team champions
Individual champions
Both team and individual champions

=== AIAW ===
Texas A&M competed in the Association for Intercollegiate Athletics for Women championships from 1976 to 1982.

Season	Coach	State	National
Kitty Holley (AIAW) (1975–1982)
1976	Kitty Holley	4	X
1977	Kitty Holley	4	16
1978	Kitty Holley	4	19
1979	Kitty Holley	3	22
1980	Kitty Holley	3	22
1981	Kitty Holley	3	8
1982	Kitty Holley	1	8

=== NCAA ===
Texas A&M has competed in the NCAA since 1982.

Season	Coach	Conference	NCAA
Kitty Holley (SWC) (1982–1992)
1983	Kitty Holley	2	X
1984	Kitty Holley	3	13
1985	Kitty Holley	1	10
1986	Kitty Holley	4	X
1987	Kitty Holley	4	X
1988	Kitty Holley	4	X
1989	Kitty Holley	4	X
1990	Kitty Holley	4	X
1991	Kitty Holley	4	X
1992	Kitty Holley	4	X
Jeanne Sutherland (SWC) (1992–1996)
1993	Jeanne Sutherland	3	X
1994	Jeanne Sutherland	5	X
1995	Jeanne Sutherland	2	X
1996	Jeanne Sutherland	2	X
Jeanne Sutherland (Big 12) (1996–2007)
1997	Jeanne Sutherland	2	17
1998	Jeanne Sutherland	1	X
1999	Jeanne Sutherland	4	X
2000	Jeanne Sutherland	8	X
2001	Jeanne Sutherland	6	X
2002	Jeanne Sutherland	9	X
2003	Jeanne Sutherland	8	X
2004	Jeanne Sutherland	2	23
2005	Jeanne Sutherland	5	22
2006	Jeanne Sutherland	1	19
2007	Jeanne Sutherland	1	X
Trelle McCombs (Big 12) (2007–2012)
2008	Trelle McCombs	2	6
2009	Trelle McCombs	2	X
2010	Trelle McCombs	1	11
2011	Trelle McCombs	2	7
2012	Trelle McCombs	6	16
Trelle McCombs (SEC) (2012–2018)
2013	Trelle McCombs	11	X
2014	Trelle McCombs	7	10
2015	Trelle McCombs	1	18
2016	Trelle McCombs	4	X
2017	Trelle McCombs	T5	X
2018	Trelle McCombs	13	X
Andrea Gaston (SEC) (2018–2021)
2019	Andrea Gaston	13	X
2020	Andrea Gaston	Cancelled due to COVID-19 pandemic	
2021	Andrea Gaston	11	X
Gerrod Chadwell (SEC) (2021–Present)
2022	Gerrod Chadwell	9	T3
2023	Gerrod Chadwell	1	T3
2024	Gerrod Chadwell	3	T5
2025	Gerrod Chadwell	10	X
2026	Gerrod Chadwell	T7	T22

== Individual champions ==
=== National ===
Year	Name
2024	Adéla Cernousek

=== Conference ===
SWC
Year	Name
1985	Patricia Gonzalez
1993	Jenny Turner
1995	Jamie Hullett (T)
1995	Isabelle Rosberg (T)

Big 12
Year	Name
1998	Isabelle Rosberg
2006	Ashley Knoll
2009	Ashley Freeman
2012	Mary Michael Maggio

SEC
Year	Name
2015	Bianca Fabrizo

== Individual honors ==
=== All-Americans ===
Player	Team	Year
Kim Bauer	First Team	1981
Shirley Furlong	First Team	1982
Shirley Furlong	First Team	1983
Jamie Hullett	First Team	1997
Ashley Knoll	First Team	2006
Ashley Knoll	Second Team	2007
Ashley Freeman	Honorable Mention	2008
Julia Boland	First Team	2010
Katerina Ruzickova	Honorable Mention	2011
Katerina Ruzickova	Second Team	2012
Marijosse Navarro	Second Team	2014
Marijosse Navarro	Second Team	2015
Maddie Szeryk	Second Team	2015
Maddie Szeryk	First Team	2017
Maddie Szeryk	First Team	2018
Blanca Fernández García-Poggio	Honorable Mention	2022
Jennie Park	Honorable Mention	2022
Jennie Park	Second Team	2023
Adéla Cernousek	First Team	2024
Cata Fernández García-Poggio	Third Team	2025
Cata Fernández García-Poggio	Honorable Mention	2026
Vanessa Borovilos	Honorable Mention	2025
Vanessa Borovilos	First Team	2026

=== Conference Athletes of the Year ===
Player of the Year
Year	Recipient	Conference
1985	Patricia Gonzalez	SWC
1998	Isabelle Rosberg	Big 12
2006	Ashley Knoll	Big 12
2007	Ashley Knoll	Big 12

Freshman of the Year
Year	Recipient	Conference
2015	Maddie Szeryk	SEC

Newcomer of the Year
Year	Recipient	Conference
2002	Nicole Melton	Big 12
2007	Danielle McVeigh	Big 12
2010	Julia Boland	Big 12

=== Conference Coach of the Year ===
Year	Recipient	Conference
1985	Kitty Holley	SWC
1995	Jeanne Sutherland	SWC
1997	Jeanne Sutherland	Big 12
2006	Jeanne Sutherland	Big 12
2007	Jeanne Sutherland	Big 12
2010	Trelle McCombs	Big 12

== See also ==
- Texas A&M Aggies men's golf
