= 1986 NCAA women's golf championship =

1986 NCAA Women's Golf Championship
Tournament information
- Location: Columbus, Ohio, U.S. 40.031886°N 83.0523498°W
- Course: Ohio State University Golf Club

Statistics
- Par: 73
- Field: 17 teams

Champion
- Team: Florida (2nd title); Individual: Page Dunlap, Florida
- Team: 1,180 (+12); Individual: 291 (−1)

Location map
- Location in the United States Location in Ohio

The 1986 NCAA Women's Golf Championships were contested at the fifth annual NCAA-sanctioned golf tournament to determine the individual and team national champions of women's collegiate golf in the United States. Until 1996, the NCAA would hold just one annual women's golf championship for all programs across Division I, Division II, and Division III.

The tournament was held at the Ohio State University Golf Club in Columbus, Ohio.

Defending champions Florida won the team championship, the Gators' second.

Page Dunlap, from Florida, won the individual title.

== Individual results ==
=== Individual champion ===
- Page Dunlap, Florida (291, −1)

== Team results ==
Rank	Team	Score
1	Florida (DC)	1,180
2	Miami (FL)	1,188
3	USC	1,202
4	Arizona State	1,205
T5	Kentucky	1,206
T5	Tulsa	1,206
7	SMU	1,207
8	San José State	1,215
9	LSU	1,217
10	Oklahoma State	1,218
11	Duke	1,220
12	Indiana	1,223
13	Georgia	1,227
14	UCLA	1,231
15	Stanford	1,232
16	Furman	1,235
17	FIU	1,242

- DC = Defending champion
- Debut appearance
