= 1985 NCAA women's golf championship =

1985 NCAA Women's Golf Championship
Tournament information
- Location: Amherst, Massachusetts, U.S. 42.364545°N 72.524298°W
- Course: Amherst Golf Club

Statistics
- Par: 73
- Field: 18 teams

Champion
- Team: Florida (1st title); Individual: Danielle Ammaccapane, Arizona State
- Team: 1,218 (+50); Individual: 298 (+6)

Location map
- Location in the United States Location in Massachusetts

The 1985 NCAA Women's Golf Championships were contested at the fourth annual NCAA-sanctioned golf tournament to determine the individual and team national champions of women's collegiate golf in the United States. Until 1996, the NCAA would hold just one women's golf championship for all programs across Division I, Division II, and Division III.

The tournament was held again at the Amherst Golf Club in Amherst, Massachusetts.

Florida won the team championship, the Gators' first.

Danielle Ammaccapane, from Arizona State, won the individual title.

== Individual results ==
=== Individual champion ===
- Danielle Ammaccapane, Arizona State (298, +6)

== Team results ==
Rank	Team	Score
1	Florida	1,218
2	Tulsa	1,233
3	Arizona State	1,236
4	Furman	1,237
5	Miami (FL) (DC)	1,255
T6	Georgia	1,257
T6	New Mexico	1,257
8	San José State	1,260
9	UCLA	1,261
10	Texas A&M	1,267
T11	U.S. International	1,269
T11	Indiana	1,269
13	Ohio State	1,270
14	BYU	1,277
15	FIU	1,279
16	Stanford	1,287
17	Weber State	1,352
18	Penn State	1,396

- DC = Defending champion
- Debut appearance
