= NCAA Division I women's golf championship =

NCAA Division I Women's Golf Championship

Tournament information
- Location: 2026: Carlsbad, California
- Established: 1982
- Course: 2026: Omni La Costa Resort and Spa
- Par: 2026: 72
- Length: 2026: 6,297 yards (5,758 m)
- Format: 72-hole stroke play 8-team match play
- Month played: May

Current champion
- Team: Stanford; Individual: Farah O'Keefe (Texas)

Current tournament
- 2026 NCAA Division I women's golf championship

The NCAA Division I Women's Golf Championship, played in the month of May, is the annual competition in women's collegiate golf for individuals and teams from universities in Division I. Golf was one of twelve women's sports added to the NCAA championship program for the 1981-82 school year. From its inception through 2014, it was a stroke play team competition with an additional individual award. Beginning in 2015, after 72 holes of stroke play, the top eight teams play in single-elimination match play to determine the team champion.

Many individual winners have gone on to have successful careers on the LPGA Tour, including 1991 champion Annika Sörenstam and 1999 champion Grace Park.

The Division I competition started in 1982. A combined Division II and Division III championship was held from 1996 to 1999, splitting into separate championships starting in 2000.

== Results ==
=== Stroke play (1978–2014) ===
| Year | Site | Host course | Par (Overall) | Team championship | | | | Individual champion | Score |
| Year | Site | Host course | Par (Overall) | Champion | Score | Runner-up | Score | Individual champion | Score |
|---|---|---|---|---|---|---|---|---|---|
| 1982; Details | Stanford, CA | Stanford Golf Course | 72 (288) | Tulsa | 1,191 | TCU | 1,227 | Kathy Baker (Tulsa) | 295 (+7) |
| 1983; Details | Athens, GA | UGA Golf Course | 74 (296) | TCU | 1,193 | Tulsa | 1,196 | Penny Hammel (Miami–FL) | 284 (−12) |
| 1984; Details | Athens, GA | UGA Golf Course | 73 (292) | Miami (FL) | 1,214 | Arizona State | 1,221 | Cindy Schreyer (Georgia) | 297 (+5) |
| 1985; Details | Amherst, MA | Amherst Golf Club | 73 (292) | Florida | 1,218 | Tulsa | 1,233 | Danielle Ammaccapane (Arizona State) | 298 (+6) |
| 1986; Details | Columbus, OH | Ohio State University Golf Club | 73 (292) | Florida (2) | 1,180 | Miami (FL) | 1,188 | Page Dunlap (Florida) | 291 (−1) |
| 1987; Details | Albuquerque, NM | Championship Golf Course | 73 (292) | San Jose State | 1,187 | Furman | 1,188 | Caroline Keggi (New Mexico) | 289 (−3) |
| 1988; Details | Las Cruces, NM | NMSU Golf Course | 74 (296) | Vacated^{3} | — | Georgia; Arizona State | 1,182 | Vacated^{3} | — |
| 1989; Details | Stanford, CA | Stanford Golf Course | 73 (292) | San Jose State (2) | 1,208 | Tulsa | 1,209 | Pat Hurst (San Jose State) | 292 (E) |
| 1990; Details | Columbia, SC | Cobblestone Park | 72 (288) | Arizona State | 1,206 | UCLA | 1,222 | Susan Slaughter (Arizona) | 297 (+9) |
| 1991; Details | Columbus, OH | Ohio State University Golf Club | 73 (292) | UCLA | 1,197^{1} | San Jose State | 1,197 | Annika Sörenstam (Arizona) | 290 (−2) |
| 1992; Details | Tempe, AZ | ASU Karsten Golf Course | 72 (288) | San Jose State (3) | 1,171 | Arizona | 1,175 | Vicki Goetze (Georgia) | 280 (−8) |
| 1993; Details | Athens, GA | UGA Golf Course | 73 (292) | Arizona State (2) | 1,187 | Texas | 1,189 | Charlotta Sörenstam (Texas) | 287 (−5) |
| 1994; Details | Eugene, OR | Eugene Country Club | 73 (292) | Arizona State (3) | 1,189 | USC | 1,205 | Emilee Klein (Arizona State) | 286 (−6) |
| 1995; Details | Wilmington, NC | Country Club of Landfall | 72 (288) | Arizona State (4) | 1,155 | San Jose State | 1,181 | Kristel Mourgue d'Algue (Arizona State) | 283 (−5) |
| 1996; Details | La Quinta, CA | La Quinta Resort & Club | 72 (288) | Arizona | 1,240^{1} | San Jose State | 1,240 | Marisa Baena (Arizona) | 296 (+8) |
| 1997; Details | Columbus, OH | Ohio State University Golf Club | 72 (288) | Arizona State (5) | 1,178 | San Jose State | 1,204 | Heather Bowie (Texas) | 285 (−3) |
| 1998; Details | Madison, WI | University Ridge Golf Course | 72 (288) | Arizona State (6) | 1,155 | Florida | 1,173 | Jennifer Rosales (USC) | 279 (−9) |
| 1999; Details | Tulsa, OK | Tulsa Country Club | 71 (213) | Duke | 895^{4} | Arizona State; Georgia | 903 | Grace Park (Arizona State) | 212 (−1) |
| 2000; Details | Corvallis, OR | Trysting Tree Golf Course | 71 (284) | Arizona (2) | 1,175 | Stanford | 1,196 | Jenna Daniels (Arizona) | 287 (+3) |
| 2001; Details | Daytona Beach, FL | LPGA International | 71 (284) | Georgia | 1,176 | Duke | 1,179 | Candy Hannemann (Duke) | 285 (+1) |
| 2002; Details | Auburn, WA | Washington National Golf Club | 71 (284) | Duke (2) | 1,164 | Arizona; Auburn; Texas | 1,170 | Virada Nirapathpongporn (Duke) | 279 (−5) |
| 2003; Details | West Lafayette, IN | Birck Boilermaker Golf Complex | 71 (284) | USC | 1,197 | Pepperdine | 1,212 | Mikaela Parmlid (USC) | 297 (+13) |
| 2004; Details | Auburn, AL | Auburn Golf Club | 72 (288) | UCLA (2) | 1,148 | Oklahoma State | 1,151 | Sarah Huarte (California) | 278 (−10) |
| 2005; Details | Sunriver, OR | Sunriver Resort, Meadow Course | 71 (284) | Duke (3) | 1,170 | UCLA | 1,175 | Anna Grzebian (Duke) | 286 (+2) |
| 2006; Details | Columbus, OH | Ohio State University Golf Club | 72 (288) | Duke (4) | 1,167 | USC | 1,177 | Dewi Schreefel (USC) | 286 (−2) |
| 2007 | Daytona Beach, FL | LPGA International | 72 (288) | Duke (5) | 1,170 | Purdue | 1,185 | Stacy Lewis (Arkansas) | 282 (−6) |
| 2008 | Albuquerque, NM | Championship Golf Course | 72 (288) | USC (2) | 1,168 | UCLA | 1,174 | Azahara Muñoz (Arizona State) | 287^{2} (−1) |
| 2009 | Owings Mills, MD | Caves Valley Golf Club | 72 (288) | Arizona State (7) | 1,182 | UCLA | 1,190 | María Hernández (Purdue) | 289 (+1) |
| 2010 | Wilmington, NC | Country Club of Landfall | 72 (288) | Purdue | 1,153 | USC | 1,154 | Caroline Hedwall (Oklahoma State) | 276 (−12) |
| 2011 | College Station, TX | Traditions Golf Course | 72 (288) | UCLA (3) | 1,173 | Purdue | 1,177 | Austin Ernst (LSU) | 281 (−7) |
| 2012 | Nashville, TN | Vanderbilt Legends Club | 72 (288) | Alabama | 1,171 | USC | 1,172 | Chirapat Jao-Javanil (Oklahoma) | 282 (−6) |
| 2013 | Athens, GA | UGA Golf Course | 72 (288) | USC (3) | 1,133 | Duke | 1,154 | Annie Park (USC) | 278 (−10) |
| 2014 | Tulsa, OK | Tulsa Country Club | 70 (280) | Duke (6) | 1,130 | USC | 1,132 | Doris Chen (USC) | 274 (−6) |

=== Stroke and match play (2015–present) ===
| Year | Site | Host course | Par | Team championship | | | Individual champion | Score |
| Year | Site | Host course | Par | Champion | Score | Runner-up | Individual champion | Score |
|---|---|---|---|---|---|---|---|---|
| 2015; Details | Bradenton, FL | The Concession Golf Club | 72 | Stanford | 3–2 | Baylor | Emma Talley (Alabama) | 285 (−3) |
| 2016; Details | Eugene, OR | Eugene Country Club | 72 | Washington | 3–2 | Stanford | Virginia Elena Carta (Duke) | 272^{5} (−16)^{6} |
| 2017; Details | Sugar Grove, IL | Rich Harvest Farms | 72 | Arizona State (8) | 3 1/2–1 1/2 | Northwestern | Monica Vaughn (Arizona State) | 217 (+1) |
| 2018; Details | Stillwater, OK | Karsten Creek | 72 | Arizona (3) | 3–2 | Alabama | Jennifer Kupcho (Wake Forest) | 280 (−8) |
| 2019; Details | Fayetteville, AR | Blessings Golf Club | 73 | Duke (7) | 3–2 | Wake Forest | María Fassi (Arkansas) | 211 (−8) |
| 2020 | Cancelled due to the COVID-19 pandemic | | | | | | | |
| 2021; Details | Scottsdale, AZ | Grayhawk Golf Club | 72 | Ole Miss | 4–1 | Oklahoma State | Rachel Heck (Stanford) | 280 (−8) |
| 2022; Details | Scottsdale, AZ | Grayhawk Golf Club | 72 | Stanford (2) | 3–2 | Oregon | Rose Zhang (Stanford) | 282 (−6) |
| 2023; Details | Scottsdale, AZ | Grayhawk Golf Club | 72 | Wake Forest | 3–1 | USC | Rose Zhang (2) (Stanford) | 278 (−10) |
| 2024; Details | Carlsbad, CA | Omni La Costa Resort & Spa | 72 | Stanford (3) | 3–2 | UCLA | Adéla Cernousek (Texas A&M) | 276 (−12) |
| 2025; Details | Carlsbad, CA | Omni La Costa Resort & Spa | 72 | Northwestern | 3–2 | Stanford | María José Marín (Arkansas) | 276 (−12) |
| 2026; Details | Carlsbad, CA | Omni La Costa Resort & Spa | 72 | Stanford (4) | 4–1 | USC | Farah O'Keefe (Texas) | 276 (−12) |

==== Notes ====
1. Team championship decided by playoff.
2. Individual championship decided by playoff.
3. Tulsa's team (1,175) and individual (Melissa McNamara, 287) championships from 1988 were vacated by the NCAA.
4. The fourth round of the 1999 championship was cancelled due to rain.
5. NCAA record – Lowest aggregate score.
6. NCAA record – Most strokes under par.

== Team titles ==
National Championships by school: 8, 7, 4, 3, 2, 1

| Team | Number | Years won |
|---|---|---|
| Arizona State | 8 | 1990, 1993, 1994, 1995, 1997, 1998, 2009, 2017 |
| Duke | 7 | 1999, 2002, 2005, 2006, 2007, 2014, 2019 |
| Stanford | 4 | 2015, 2022, 2024, 2026 |
| Arizona | 3 | 1996, 2000, 2018 |
| San Jose State | 3 | 1987, 1989, 1992 |
| UCLA | 3 | 1991, 2004, 2011 |
| USC | 3 | 2003, 2008, 2013 |
| Florida | 2 | 1985, 1986 |
| Alabama | 1 | 2012 |
| Georgia | 1 | 2001 |
| Miami | 1 | 1984 |
| Northwestern | 1 | 2025 |
| Ole Miss | 1 | 2021 |
| Purdue | 1 | 2010 |
| TCU | 1 | 1983 |
| Tulsa | 1 | 1982, ~~1988~~ |
| Wake Forest | 1 | 2023 |
| Washington | 1 | 2016 |

== Appearances by team ==
Total columns

- School is the name of the college or university sponsoring the golf team.
- Conference is the conference in which the golf team will compete for the upcoming Spring 2027 season.
- # Total appearances in the NCAA Championship, not counting vacated appearances.
- 15 Finishes in the top 15 at the NCAA Championship
- T8 Finishes in the top 8 at the NCAA Championship
- T4 Finishes in the top 4 at the NCAA Championship
- T2 Finishes in the top 2 at the NCAA Championship
- CH National Championships

Table entries

- CH National champion
  - ~~CH~~ Vacated National champion
- RU National runner-up

1982 to 2014

- Numbers indicate the placement of the team in that tournament beyond second

2015 to present

- SF Semifinals
- QF Quarterfinals
- Numbers indicate the placement of the team in that tournament beyond eighth

| School | Conference | # | 15 | T8 | T4 | T2 | CH | 82 | 83 | 84 | 85 | 86 | 87 | 88 | 89 | 90 | 91 | 92 | 93 | 94 | 95 | 96 | 97 | 98 | 99 | 00 | 01 | 02 | 03 | 04 | 05 | 06 | 07 | 08 | 09 | 10 | 11 | 12 | 13 | 14 | 15 | 16 | 17 | 18 | 19 | 21 | 22 | 23 | 24 | 25 | 26 |
|---|---|---|---|---|---|---|---|---|---|---|---|---|---|---|---|---|---|---|---|---|---|---|---|---|---|---|---|---|---|---|---|---|---|---|---|---|---|---|---|---|---|---|---|---|---|---|---|---|---|---|---|
| Arizona State | Big 12 | 40 | 35 | 23 | 15 | 11 | 8 | 10 | 13 | RU | 3 | 4 | 11 | RU | 6ᴛ | CH | | 9 | CH | CH | CH | 6 | CH | CH | RU | 11ᴛ | 18 | 9ᴛ | 18 | 10 | 8ᴛ | 4 | 13 | 5 | CH | 4 | 17 | 6ᴛ | 5 | 5 | | | CH | 16ᴛ | 14ᴛ | QF | 9 | | 16 | 9 | 10 |
| Duke | ACC | 35 | 32 | 24 | 16 | 9 | 7 | | 16 | 7 | | 11 | 7ᴛ | 5 | | | 13 | 12 | | 4 | 11 | 7 | | 4 | CH | 14 | RU | CH | 10 | 3 | CH | CH | CH | 3 | 6 | 8ᴛ | | 15 | RU | CH | SF | SF | 18 | QF | CH | SF | | 18ᴛ | 14 | | QF |
| Stanford | ACC | 40 | 33 | 22 | 13 | 7 | 4 | 6 | | 9 | 16 | 15 | 10 | | 10ᴛ | 9 | 6 | 4 | 11 | 7 | 4 | 5 | 4 | 8ᴛ | 8 | RU | 9 | 11 | 16 | 12ᴛ | 19 | 13ᴛ | 5 | | | 19ᴛ | 23 | 24 | 13ᴛ | 18ᴛ | CH | RU | SF | SF | QF | QF | CH | SF | CH | RU | CH |
| USC | Big Ten | 38 | 36 | 27 | 19 | 10 | 3 | 9 | | | | 3 | 4 | 16 | 9 | 12 | | 15ᴛ | 5 | RU | 14 | | | 7 | 7 | 4 | 7 | 14 | CH | 12ᴛ | 11ᴛ | RU | 4 | CH | 3 | RU | 5ᴛ | RU | CH | RU | SF | QF | SF | SF | QF | 23 | 10 | RU | SF | QF | RU |
| UCLA | Big Ten | 35 | 32 | 24 | 13 | 8 | 3 | 7 | | | 9 | 14 | 16 | 13 | | RU | CH | 5 | 10 | 6 | 7 | 4 | 5 | | | | 5ᴛ | 21 | 5ᴛ | CH | RU | 11 | 3 | RU | RU | 6 | CH | 8 | 4 | 3 | 15 | SF | | QF | 20 | 15 | QF | | RU | 12 | |
| San Jose State | Mountain West | 24 | 16 | 14 | 10 | 7 | 3 | 13ᴛ | | 17 | 8 | 8 | CH | 6 | CH | 4 | RU | CH | 3 | 3 | RU | RU | RU | | 17ᴛ | 15 | 17 | | | | | | | | | 23ᴛ | | | 18ᴛ | | | | | | 19 | | QF | 16 | 17ᴛ | | |
| Arizona | Big 12 | 33 | 30 | 20 | 12 | 5 | 3 | 13ᴛ | 11 | | | | 12 | 8 | 4 | 7 | 3 | RU | 14 | | 12 | CH | 3 | 3 | 4 | CH | 8 | RU | 7 | 15ᴛ | | 17 | 14ᴛ | 23 | 16 | 5 | 15 | | 8 | 7ᴛ | QF | 9ᴛ | | CH | SF | SF | | 9ᴛ | | | |
| Florida | SEC | 30 | 24 | 14 | 8 | 3 | 2 | 4 | 5 | 4 | CH | CH | 3 | 4 | 5 | 3 | 15 | | | 15 | | 9 | 10 | RU | | 18 | | 6ᴛ | 8 | | 10 | 6ᴛ | | 9 | | | 10ᴛ | 12 | 17 | 18ᴛ | | 17 | QF | 21 | 11 | | | | | 17 | 11 |
| Tulsa | RU | 5ᴛ | 9 | | | 9 | | 10 | 8ᴛ | 6 | 6 | 16 | 10 | 12 | 21 | | 23 | | | 19ᴛ | | | | | | | | | | | | | | 29 | 26ᴛ | | | | | | | | | | | | | | | | |
| Georgia | SEC | 25 | 21 | 14 | 6 | 3 | 1 | | 3 | | 6ᴛ | 13 | | RU | 6ᴛ | 17 | 5 | 3 | 4 | | 18 | | | 10ᴛ | RU | 7 | CH | 5 | 11 | 9 | | 6ᴛ | 8 | 10ᴛ | 15 | | | | | | | 18ᴛ | | | | 18ᴛ | QF | 14ᴛ | | | |
| Purdue | Big Ten | 20 | 14 | 5 | 5 | 3 | 1 | | | | | | | | | | | | | | | | | | | 9 | 20 | 16 | 12 | 22 | 20 | 9 | RU | 4 | 10 | CH | RU | 9 | 3 | | 12 | | 11 | | 9ᴛ | | 12 | | 29 | 27 | |
| Wake Forest | ACC | 22 | 16 | 5 | 3 | 2 | 1 | | | | | | | | | | | | 7 | 8 | 3 | 11 | 11 | | | 17 | | 22 | | 14 | | 15 | 12 | 10ᴛ | 13ᴛ | | 14 | | | | 13 | | | 16ᴛ | RU | 12 | 16 | CH | 9 | 19ᴛ | 16ᴛ |
| Alabama | SEC | 16 | 12 | 5 | 3 | 2 | 1 | | | | | | 9 | | | | | | | | | | | | | | | | | | | 24 | 23 | 12ᴛ | 11 | 3 | 8ᴛ | CH | 7 | 9 | 14 | 12ᴛ | 14ᴛ | RU | | 24 | 24 | | | | |
| Miami (FL) | ACC | 9 | 7 | 5 | 2 | 2 | 1 | | 6 | CH | 5 | RU | 5 | 9 | | | | 10 | | | | | | | | | | | | | | | | | | | | | | | | 21 | 16ᴛ | | | | | | | | |
| Northwestern | Big Ten | 12 | 10 | 3 | 2 | 2 | 1 | | | | | | | | | | | | | | | | | | | 24 | | | | | | | | | | | | | 15 | 15ᴛ | 10 | 9ᴛ | RU | QF | 13 | | | 22ᴛ | 11ᴛ | CH | 14 |
| TCU | Big 12 | 14 | 6 | 2 | 2 | 2 | 1 | RU | CH | 14 | | | | | 14 | | 17 | | | | | | 12 | | 17ᴛ | 20ᴛ | | | | | | | 11 | 17ᴛ | 18 | 19ᴛ | | | | | | | | | | | 21 | 20 | | | |
| Washington | Big Ten | 14 | 6 | 4 | 1 | 1 | 1 | | | | | | | | | | | | | | 16ᴛ | | 18 | 18 | | | 16 | 20 | | 6ᴛ | 14 | 6ᴛ | | | | | 16 | | | 17 | QF | CH | | 13ᴛ | 18 | | | | | | |
| Ole Miss | SEC | 7 | 2 | 1 | 1 | 1 | 1 | | | | | | | | | | | | | | | | | | | | | | | | | | | | | | | | | | | | | 24 | 14ᴛ | CH | | 28 | 30 | 21 | 26 |
| Texas | SEC | 34 | 28 | 17 | 6 | 2 | – | | 15 | 11 | | | 17 | 7 | 10ᴛ | 5ᴛ | 7 | 6 | RU | 5 | 9ᴛ | 3 | | 10ᴛ | 9 | 3 | 3 | RU | 3 | 6ᴛ | | | | 17ᴛ | 23 | 16ᴛ | | 13ᴛ | 21 | | | 23 | 13 | 13ᴛ | QF | QF | 13 | QF | 11ᴛ | QF | QF |
| Oklahoma State | Big 12 | 27 | 22 | 12 | 5 | 2 | – | 3 | | | | 10 | 6 | 12 | 3 | 16 | | 7 | | 10 | | | | | 12 | | 5ᴛ | 13 | 5ᴛ | RU | 8ᴛ | 18 | 14ᴛ | 19ᴛ | 4 | 8ᴛ | | | 12 | | | 11 | | | | RU | 19 | 11ᴛ | 24ᴛ | 15 | QF |
| Auburn | SEC | 22 | 18 | 10 | 5 | 1 | – | | | | | | | | 13 | 8 | | | | | | 18 | 13 | 19 | 15ᴛ | 6 | 4 | RU | 9 | | 3 | 12 | 9 | 12ᴛ | | 11ᴛ | | | 6 | | | | | 16ᴛ | SF | QF | SF | | QF | | 21 |
| Pepperdine | West Coast | 15 | 12 | 8 | 3 | 1 | – | | | | | | | | | | | | | | | | | | 5 | 8 | 14 | 9ᴛ | RU | | 4 | 3 | 7 | | 9 | 14ᴛ | | 21 | | | | | 23 | | | | | QF | 19 | | QF |
| Furman | SoCon | 19 | 14 | 5 | 3 | 1 | – | | 9 | 3 | 4 | 16 | RU | | | 15 | | 11 | 6 | 11 | 6 | 13 | 16 | | 15ᴛ | | | | | 15ᴛ | 21 | | | 24 | | | | | | | | 20 | 12 | 11 | | | | | | | |
| Oregon | Big Ten | 14 | 10 | 5 | 3 | 1 | – | | | | | | | | | | | | 17 | 14 | 13 | | 7 | 14 | | 11ᴛ | | | | | | | | | | 23ᴛ | | | 22 | | | QF | 24 | | | 11 | RU | | SF | SF | |
| Baylor | Big 12 | 11 | 4 | 2 | 1 | 1 | – | | | | | | | | | | | | | | | | | | | | | | | 19ᴛ | | | | | | | | 16ᴛ | | | RU | | QF | 9 | | 14 | 18 | 17 | 21 | 30 | 25 |
| Texas A&M | SEC | 17 | 10 | 6 | 2 | – | – | 5 | | 13 | 10 | | | | | | | | | | | | 17 | | | | | | | 23 | 22 | 19 | | 6ᴛ | | 11ᴛ | 7 | 16ᴛ | | 10ᴛ | 18 | | | | | | SF | SF | QF | | 22 |
| LSU | SEC | 19 | 15 | 5 | 2 | – | – | 16ᴛ | | | | 9 | | | | | | | | | | 8 | | 5 | 10 | 10 | 12ᴛ | | | | | 23 | | 15 | 12 | | 3 | 3 | | | 20ᴛ | | | | | 9ᴛ | 11 | 14ᴛ | QF | 10ᴛ | 16ᴛ |
| Virginia | ACC | 16 | 11 | 5 | 2 | – | – | | | | | | | | | | | | | | | | | | | | | | | | 13 | | | 12ᴛ | 8 | 13 | 4 | 4 | | 14 | 20ᴛ | QF | | 22 | 14ᴛ | | 15 | 24ᴛ | 28 | QF | 18ᴛ |
| Ohio State | Big Ten | 24 | 13 | 7 | 1 | – | – | | 14 | 10 | 13 | | | 17 | 17 | | | | 15 | | | | 8ᴛ | 12 | 11 | 20ᴛ | 22 | 8 | 4 | 8 | 6ᴛ | | | | 24 | | 21 | 22 | | 7ᴛ | | 22 | QF | 23 | | | | | | 25ᴛ | 27 |
| Arkansas | SEC | 14 | 12 | 5 | 1 | – | – | | | | | | | | | | | | | | | | | | | | | | | | 11ᴛ | 10 | | 8 | | | 5ᴛ | 23 | 13ᴛ | | 9 | 12ᴛ | | 10 | QF | | 22ᴛ | | 10 | QF | SF |
| Florida State | ACC | 18 | 12 | 3 | 1 | – | – | | | | | | | | | | 14 | 14 | | 18 | | | | | 13 | | | | 19ᴛ | 19ᴛ | | 16 | | | | 10 | | | | | | 15 | 20 | 12 | 12 | 9ᴛ | QF | QF | 11ᴛ | SF | 23ᴛ |
| California | ACC | 10 | 7 | 3 | 1 | – | – | | | | | | | | | | | | | | | | | | | | 19 | 15 | 14ᴛ | 4 | 5 | 5 | | | | | 12 | | | 22 | 24 | | 14ᴛ | | | | | | | | |
| Oklahoma | SEC | 10 | 6 | 3 | 1 | – | – | | | | | | | | | | | | 13 | 12 | 16ᴛ | | | | | 23 | | 6ᴛ | | | | | | | | | | 6ᴛ | 9ᴛ | 4 | | | | 20 | | | | | | 23ᴛ | |
| SMU | ACC | 9 | 7 | 2 | 1 | – | – | 11 | 4 | | | 7 | | | 16 | | 12 | 15ᴛ | | | | | | | | | | | | | | | | | | | | | | | | | | | | | | 11ᴛ | 24ᴛ | | 12ᴛ |
| South Florida | American | 6 | 4 | 2 | 1 | – | – | | 10 | 5 | | | | | | 10 | 4 | | | | | | | | | | 23 | 24 | | | | | | | | | | | | | | | | | | | | | | | |
| Eastern Michigan | MAC | 1 | 1 | 1 | 1 | – | – | | | | | | | | | | | | | | | | | | | | | | | | | | | | | | | | | | | | | | | | | | | | SF |
| North Carolina | ACC | 18 | 14 | 6 | – | – | – | 16ᴛ | | 12 | | | | | 8 | | | 8 | 8ᴛ | 16 | 8 | | | 15 | | | | | 13 | 15ᴛ | | | 21 | | 7 | | 8ᴛ | 10 | | | | 14 | 9 | | | | | | 26ᴛ | | 15 |
| New Mexico | Mountain West | 16 | 10 | 5 | – | – | – | 8 | 12 | 8 | 6ᴛ | | 7ᴛ | 14 | | | | | 16 | | 15 | 17 | | 8ᴛ | | | 21 | | | 15ᴛ | | | 22 | | 19 | 16ᴛ | | | | | | | | | | | | 9ᴛ | | | |
| Tennessee | SEC | 16 | 9 | 4 | – | – | – | | | | | | | | | | | | | 13 | | | 6 | | | 5 | | | | 11 | 6ᴛ | 13ᴛ | 17ᴛ | | 17 | 19ᴛ | 13 | 19 | | | QF | 16 | | | 24 | | | | | 13 | 18ᴛ |
| South Carolina | SEC | 22 | 14 | 3 | – | – | – | | | | | | 14ᴛ | | | | | | 12 | | 9ᴛ | 14 | | | 14 | | 24 | 23 | 17 | | | | | 22 | | 14ᴛ | 18 | 5 | 20 | 13 | 17 | QF | 10 | | | 13 | 14 | QF | 23 | 10ᴛ | |
| Vanderbilt | SEC | 14 | 7 | 3 | – | – | – | | | | | | | | | | | | | | | | | | | | | 18 | 14ᴛ | 5 | | | 6 | | | 7 | 10ᴛ | 11 | 18ᴛ | 10ᴛ | | | | | 23 | | 22ᴛ | 27 | 20 | 16 | |
| Indiana | Big Ten | 11 | 8 | 2 | – | – | – | | | | 11ᴛ | 12 | 13 | | | 11 | | 13 | 8ᴛ | 17 | 5 | | | 13 | | | | | | | | | 24 | | | | | | | | | | | | 21 | | | | | | |
| Kent State | MAC | 8 | 3 | 2 | – | – | – | | | | | | | | | | | | | | | | | | | | 15 | | 19ᴛ | | | 21 | | | | 22 | | | | | | | QF | QF | 17 | 17 | | | | | |
| Denver | West Coast | 3 | 2 | 2 | – | – | – | | | | | | | | | | | | | | | | | | | | | | | | | | 20 | 6ᴛ | 5 | | | | | | | | | | | | | | | | |
| Lamar | Southland | 2 | 2 | 2 | – | – | – | | 7 | | | | | | | | 8 | | | | | | | | | | | | | | | | | | | | | | | | | | | | | | | | | | |
| Kentucky | SEC | 7 | 4 | 1 | – | – | – | | | | | 5ᴛ | | 10ᴛ | | 13 | 10 | 17 | | | | | | | | | | | | | | | | | | | | | | | | | | | | 18ᴛ | | | | | 23ᴛ |
| Mississippi State | SEC | 6 | 4 | 1 | – | – | – | | | | | | | | | | | | | | | | | | | | | | | | | | | | | | | | 24 | 6 | | | | | | | 17 | 13 | 15 | 14 | |
| FIU | CUSA | 4 | 3 | 1 | – | – | – | 15 | 8 | | 15 | 17 | | | | | | | | | | | | | | | | | | | | | | | | | | | | | | | | | | | | | | | |
| Texas Tech | Big 12 | 5 | 2 | 1 | – | – | – | | | | | | | | | | | | | | | 12 | | | | | | | | | | | | | | | | | | | QF | | 22 | | | | | 21 | | | 29 |
| Clemson | ACC | 3 | 1 | 1 | – | – | – | | | | | | | | | | | | | | | | | | | | | | | | | | | | | | | | | | | | 21 | | | | | 24ᴛ | QF | | |
| New Mexico State | CUSA | 9 | 7 | – | – | – | – | | | | | | | 10ᴛ | 15 | | 11 | | | | | 15ᴛ | 15 | 17 | 19 | 11ᴛ | 11 | | | | | | | | | | | | | | | | | | | | | | | | |
| US International }} | defunct | 4 | 4 | – | – | – | – | | | 15 | 11ᴛ | | 14ᴛ | 15 | | | | | | | | | | | | | | | | | | | | | | | | | | | | | | | | | | | | | |
| Michigan State | Big Ten | 18 | 3 | – | – | – | – | 18 | | 16 | | | | | | | | | | | | | | | | 20ᴛ | 12ᴛ | 19 | | 24 | 17 | | 16 | | 13ᴛ | | | 20 | 9ᴛ | 20ᴛ | | | 19 | | | 16 | | 18ᴛ | 17ᴛ | 18 | 28 |
| Tulane | American | 6 | 3 | – | – | – | – | | | | | | | | | | | | | | | | | | | | | | | | 15 | | | | 20 | 18 | | | 9ᴛ | 15ᴛ | 19 | | | | | | | | | | |
| BYU | Big 12 | 5 | 2 | – | – | – | – | 12 | | | 14 | | | | | | | | | | | | | | | | | | | | 24 | | 17ᴛ | | | | | | | | | 24 | | | | | | | | | |
| NC State | ACC | 4 | 2 | – | – | – | – | | | | | | | | | | | | | | | | | | | | | | | | | | | | | | | 13ᴛ | | 10ᴛ | 22 | | | | | | | 30 | | | |
| Louisville | ACC | 2 | 2 | – | – | – | – | | | | | | | | | | | | | | | | | | | | | | | | | | 10 | | | | | | | | | | | 15 | | | | | | | |
| UC Davis | Mountain West | 4 | 1 | – | – | – | – | | | | | | | | | | | | | | | | | | | | | | | | | | | 21 | | | 20 | | 16 | | 11 | | | | | | | | | | |
| Campbell | CAA | 3 | 1 | – | – | – | – | | | | | | | | | | | | | | | | 14 | | | | | | | | | | | | | | | | | 20ᴛ | 23 | | | | | | | | | | |
| Kansas | Big 12 | 3 | 1 | – | – | – | – | | | | | | | | | 14 | | | | | | | | | | | | | | | | | | | | | | | | 24 | | | | | | | | | | 22 | |
| Iowa State | Big 12 | 3 | 1 | – | – | – | – | | | | | | | | | | | | | | | | | | | | | | | | | | | | | | | | | 23 | | | | | | | | | | 23ᴛ | 9 |
| Minnesota | Big Ten | 2 | 1 | – | – | – | – | | | | | | | | 12 | | | | | | | | | | | | | | | | | | | | | | 19 | | | | | | | | | | | | | | |
| UCF | Big 12 | 2 | 1 | – | – | – | – | | | | | | | | | | | | | | | 15ᴛ | | | | | | | | | | | | | | | | | | | | | | | 22 | | | | | | |
| Missouri | SEC | 2 | 1 | – | – | – | – | | | | | | | | | | | | | | | | | | | | | | | | 16 | | | | | | | | | | | | | | | | | | | | 12ᴛ |
| Illinois | Big Ten | 1 | 1 | – | – | – | – | | | | | | | | | | | | | | | | | | | | | | | | | | | | | | | | | | | | | | 9ᴛ | | | | | | |
| Michigan | Big Ten | 5 | – | – | – | – | – | | | | | | | | | | | | | | | | | | | | | 17 | | | | | | | | | | | | | | 18ᴛ | 16ᴛ | | | 20 | 20 | | | | |
| UNLV | Mountain West | 5 | – | – | – | – | – | | | | | | | | | | | | | | | | | | | | | | | 21 | | 22 | | 16 | | | | | | | 16 | | | | | | | | | 28ᴛ | |
| Oregon State | Pac-12 | 4 | – | – | – | – | – | | | | | | | | | | | | | | | | | 16 | | | | | | | | | | | | | | | | | | | | | | | | 22ᴛ | 22 | | 30 |
| Nebraska | Big Ten | 3 | – | – | – | – | – | | | | | | | | | | | | | | | | | | | 19 | | | 22 | | | 20 | | | | | | | | | | | | | | | | | | | |
| UC Irvine | Big West | 3 | – | – | – | – | – | | | | | | | | | | | | | | | | | | | | | | | | 18 | | 19 | | 22 | | | | | | | | | | | | | | | | |
| Wisconsin | Big Ten | 2 | – | – | – | – | – | | | | | | | | | | | | | | | | | | | | | | 24 | | | | | | | | | | 23 | | | | | | | | | | | | |
| Colorado | Big 12 | 2 | – | – | – | – | – | | | | | | | | | | | | | | | | | | | | | | | | | | | | | | | 18 | | | | | | 19 | | | | | | | |
| Rollins | D2 | 1 | – | – | – | – | – | 19 | | | | | | | | | | | | | | | | | | | | | | | | | | | | | | | | | | | | | | | | | | | |
| Illinois State | Missouri Valley | 1 | – | – | – | – | – | | 17 | | | | | | | | | | | | | | | | | | | | | | | | | | | | | | | | | | | | | | | | | | |
| Penn State | Big Ten | 1 | – | – | – | – | – | | | | 18 | | | | | | | | | | | | | | | | | | | | | | | | | | | | | | | | | | | | | | | | |
| Weber State | Big Sky | 1 | – | – | – | – | – | | | | 17 | | | | | | | | | | | | | | | | | | | | | | | | | | | | | | | | | | | | | | | | |
| Iowa | Big Ten | 1 | – | – | – | – | – | | | | | | | | | | 16 | | | | | | | | | | | | | | | | | | | | | | | | | | | | | | | | | | |
| Washington State | Pac-12 | 1 | – | – | – | – | – | | | | | | | | | | | | | | | | | | | | | | 23 | | | | | | | | | | | | | | | | | | | | | | |
| Chattanooga | SoCon | 1 | – | – | – | – | – | | | | | | | | | | | | | | | | | | | | | | | | | | | | 21 | | | | | | | | | | | | | | | | |
| Coastal Carolina | Sun Belt | 1 | – | – | – | – | – | | | | | | | | | | | | | | | | | | | | | | | | | | | | | | 24 | | | | | | | | | | | | | | |
| Notre Dame | ACC | 1 | – | – | – | – | – | | | | | | | | | | | | | | | | | | | | | | | | | | | | | | 22 | | | | | | | | | | | | | | |
| Maryland | Big Ten | 1 | – | – | – | – | – | | | | | | | | | | | | | | | | | | | | | | | | | | | | | | | | | | | | | | | 21ᴛ | | | | | |
| Virginia Tech | ACC | 1 | – | – | – | – | – | | | | | | | | | | | | | | | | | | | | | | | | | | | | | | | | | | | | | | | 21ᴛ | | | | | |
| Augusta | West Coast | 1 | – | – | – | – | – | | | | | | | | | | | | | | | | | | | | | | | | | | | | | | | | | | | | | | | | | 26 | | | |
| Kansas State | Big 12 | 1 | – | – | – | – | – | | | | | | | | | | | | | | | | | | | | | | | | | | | | | | | | | | | | | | | | | | | 19ᴛ | |
| Georgia Southern | Sun Belt | 1 | – | – | – | – | – | | | | | | | | | | | | | | | | | | | | | | | | | | | | | | | | | | | | | | | | | | | 25ᴛ | |
| Cal State Fullerton | Big West | 1 | – | – | – | – | – | | | | | | | | | | | | | | | | | | | | | | | | | | | | | | | | | | | | | | | | | | | 28ᴛ | |
| Houston | Big 12 | 1 | – | – | – | – | – | | | | | | | | | | | | | | | | | | | | | | | | | | | | | | | | | | | | | | | | | | | | 20 |

== Winners of both NCAA and U.S. Amateur ==
The following women have won both the NCAA individual championship and the U.S. Women's Amateur. Only Vicki Goetze (1992) managed the feat in the same year.

| Player | U.S. Amateur | NCAA |
|---|---|---|
| Pat Hurst | 1990 | 1989 |
| Vicki Goetze | 1989, 1992 | 1992 |
| Grace Park | 1998 | 1999 |
| Virada Nirapathpongporn | 2003 | 2002 |
| Emma Talley | 2013 | 2015 |
| Rose Zhang | 2020 | 2022, 2023 |

== See also ==
- AIAW Intercollegiate Women's Golf Champions
- NAIA Women's Golf Championship
- National Golf Coaches Association
