= Mariah Stackhouse =

American professional golfer (born 1994)

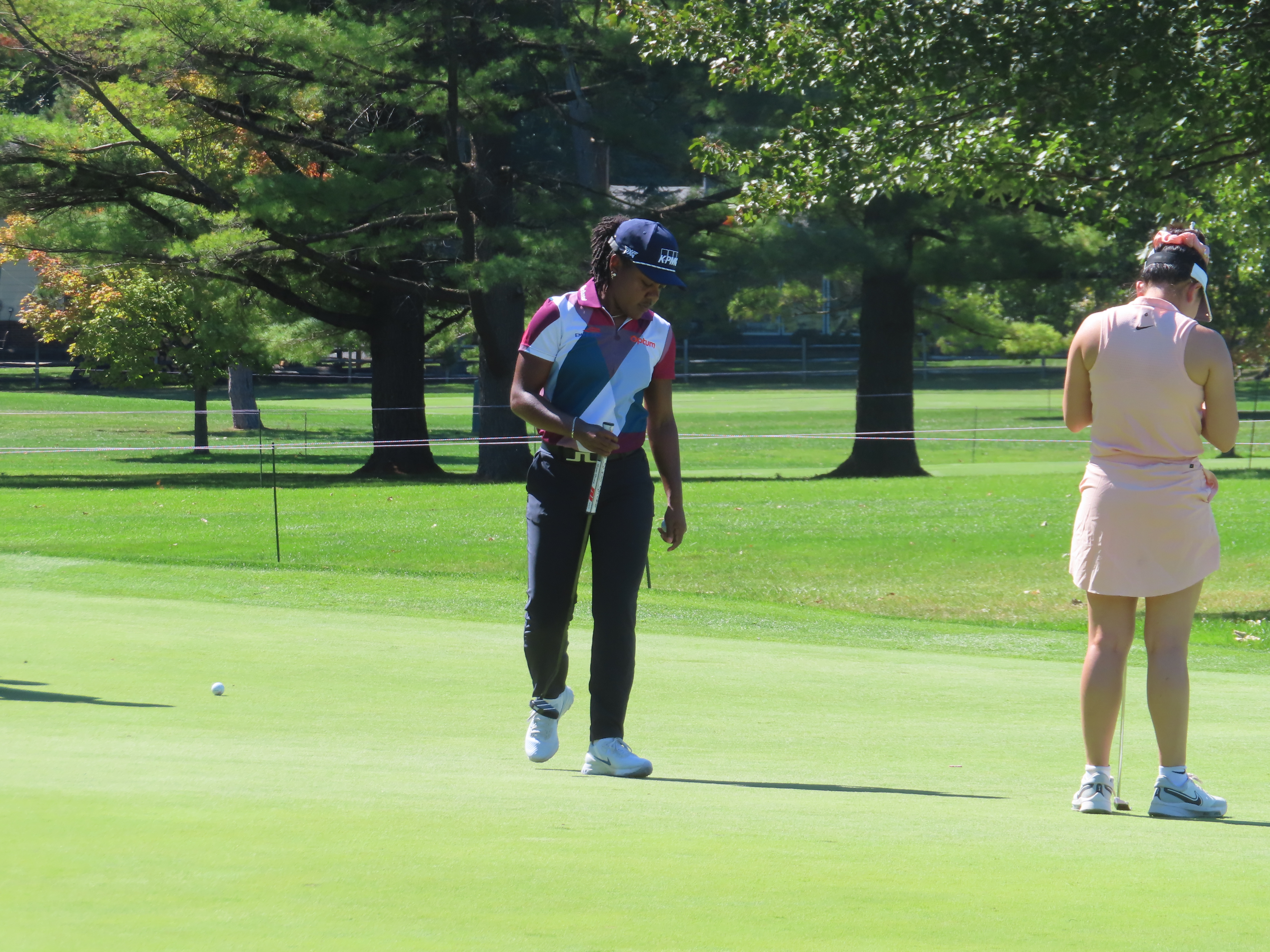
- Stackhouse at the 2022 Dana Open

Personal information
- Full name: Mariah Imani Stackhouse
- Nationality: United States
- Born: March 4, 1994 (age 32) Charlotte, North Carolina, U.S.
- Height: 5 ft 6 in (168 cm)

Career
- Sport: Golf
- College: Stanford University
- Turned professional: 2017
- Current tour: LPGA Tour

Best results in LPGA major championships
- Chevron Championship: 77th: 2019
- Women's PGA C'ship: T33: 2021
- U.S. Women's Open: CUT: 2011, 2013, 2019
- Women's British Open: CUT: 2018, 2019
- Evian Championship: T68: 2017

Mariah Stackhouse (born March 4, 1994) is an American professional golfer on the U.S.-based LPGA Tour. Stackhouse is a graduate of Stanford University, where she was a four-year All-American, and majored in communications. She helped the Cardinal to an NCAA title in 2015. In 2011, at the age of 17, she became the youngest African American woman to earn a spot in the field at the U.S. Open. In 2014, she became the first African American woman to make the Curtis Cup team, which the United States won that year.

== Early life and amateur career ==
Stackhouse is the daughter of Ken Stackhouse, formerly a partner in an architectural firm, and Sharon Stackhouse, a hospital administrator.

When Stackhouse was a 2-year old, her father cut down a set of golf clubs for her. "I began to practice alongside him, and he never stopped taking me. I guess I developed a liking for the game, I kept practicing, and here I am now," says Stackhouse. She played in her first tournament at age 6 and tied for first.

Stackhouse graduated from North Clayton High School in Riverdale, GA, where she was elected class president two years in a row.

In 2013 as a freshman at Stanford, Stackhouse shot a 61 at the Peg Barnard Invitational Tournament which set an NCAA scoring record. Her round of 61 included a front nine score of 26 (−9).

At the 2015 NCAA Division I Championship, Stackhouse finished 6th in the individual competition and led her team to the team title.

== Professional career ==
=== 2016–Present ===
Stackhouse qualified for the LPGA Tour by finishing in a tie for 21st at the LPGA Qualifying Tournament to earn Priority List Category 17 status for the 2017 LPGA season. In making her professional debut in the Portland Classic in June 2016, she became the seventh African American woman to earn a LPGA Tour card.

In the 2018 ShopRite LPGA Classic, Stackhouse finished in 7th place, her best showing at that point in her professional career. On June 9, 2019 she started in the final group at the ShopRite LPGA Classic and finished tied for 5th, a career best.

== Results in LPGA majors ==
Results not in chronological order.

Tournament	2011	2012	2013	2014	2015	2016	2017	2018	2019	2020
Chevron Championship								CUT	77	
Women's PGA Championship								CUT	T43	T65
U.S. Women's Open	CUT		CUT						CUT	
The Evian Championship ^							T68	CUT	CUT	NT
Women's British Open								CUT	CUT	

Tournament	2021	2022	2023	2024
Chevron Championship				
U.S. Women's Open				
Women's PGA Championship	T33	CUT	T52	T60
The Evian Championship ^				
Women's British Open				

^ The Evian Championship was added as a major in 2013

Did not play

CUT = missed the half-way cut
NT = no tournament
T = tied

=== Summary ===
Tournament	Wins	2nd	3rd	Top-5	Top-10	Top-25	Events	Cuts made
Chevron Championship	0	0	0	0	0	0	2	1
Women's PGA Championship	0	0	0	0	0	0	7	5
U.S. Women's Open	0	0	0	0	0	0	3	0
The Evian Championship	0	0	0	0	0	0	3	1
Women's British Open	0	0	0	0	0	0	2	0
Totals	0	0	0	0	0	0	17	7

== LPGA Tour career summary ==
Year	Tournaments played	Cuts made*	Wins	2nds	3rds	Top 10s	Best finish	Earnings ($)	Money list rank	Scoring average	Scoring rank
2011	1	0	0	0	0	0	MC	0	–	81.50	n/a
2012	Did not play										
2013	1	0	0	0	0	0	MC	0	–	78.50	n/a
2014	2	0	0	0	0	0	MC	0	–	73.00	n/a
2015	Did not play										
2016	1	1	0	0	0	0	T47	0	–	72.00	n/a
2017	15	7	0	0	0	1	T8	81,678	114	71.83	82
2018	26	20	0	0	0	2	T7	273,260	67	71.93	77
2019	20	8	0	0	0	1	T5	127,365	100	72.54	125
2020	10	6	0	0	0	1	T5	89,463	89	71.93	64
2021	16	3	0	0	0	0	T33	39,724	139	73.61	147
2022	10	3	0	0	0	0	39	11,772	180	72.75	136
2023	10	3	0	0	0	0	T23	53,722	156	72.96	n/a
2024	1	1	0	0	0	0	T60	23,969	176	74.75	n/a

Official through the 2024 season
* Includes matchplay and other tournaments without a cut.

== World ranking ==
Position in Women's World Golf Rankings at the end of each calendar year.

Year	World ranking	Notes
2016	674	
2017	313	
2018	137	
2019	197	
2020	214	
2021	311	
2022	658	
2023	527	
2024	654	

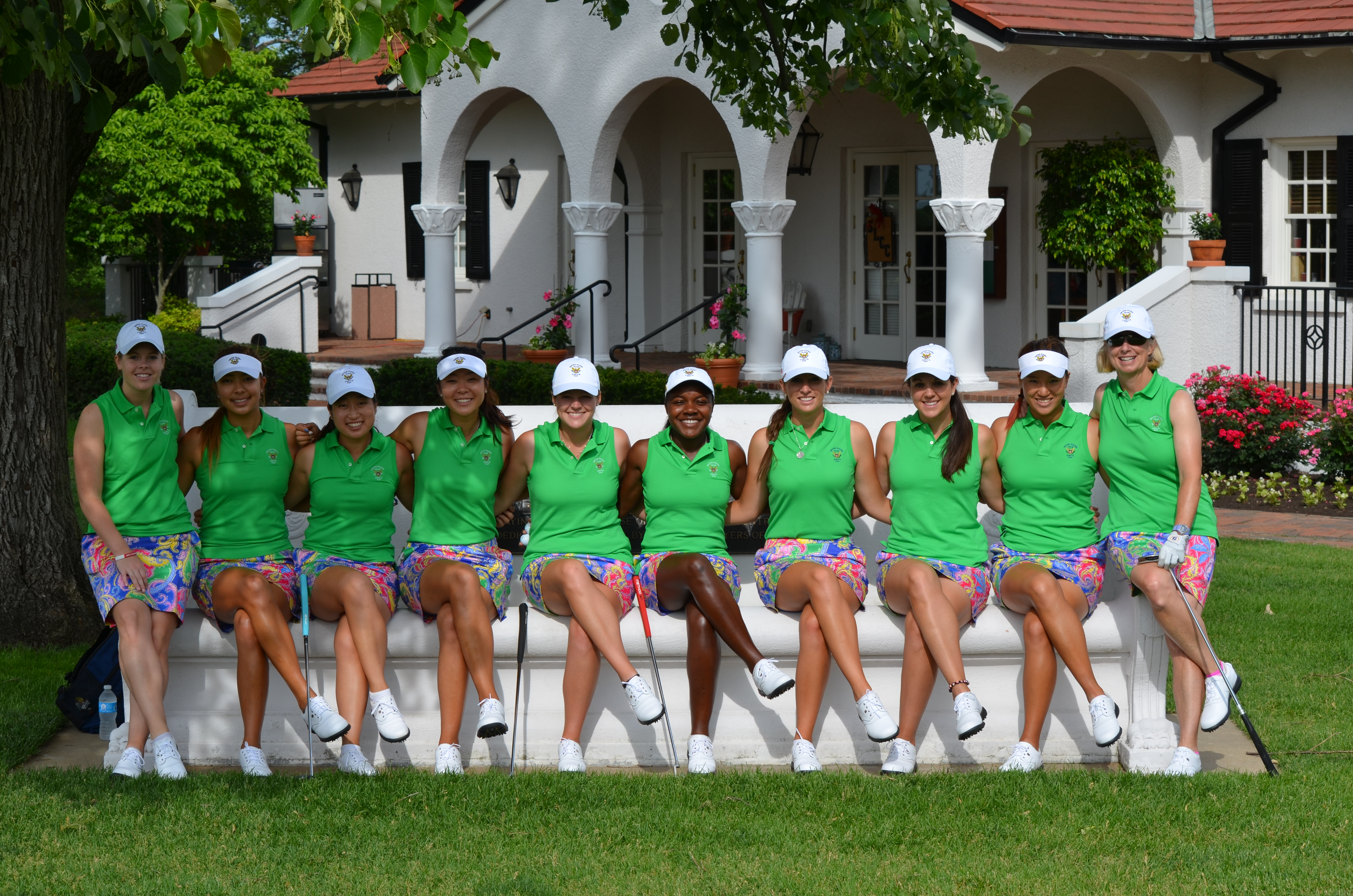
Stackhouse and her teammates on the 2014 Curtis Cup team

== Team appearances ==
Amateur

- Curtis Cup (representing the United States): 2014 (winners)
- Junior Solheim Cup (representing the United States): 2011 (winners)
