= María José Marín =

Colombian golfer (born 2006)

Personal information
- Nationality: Colombia
- Born: 17 July 2006 (age 20) León, Mexico
- Height: 152 cm (5 ft 0 in)

Career
- Sport: Golf
- College: University of Arkansas
- Status: Amateur

Best results in LPGA major championships
- Chevron Championship: DNP
- Women's PGA C'ship: DNP
- U.S. Women's Open: T8: 2026
- Women's British Open: CUT: 2026
- Evian Championship: T57: 2026

Achievements and awards
- SEC Freshman of the Year: 2024
- SEC Player of the Year: 2025
- Honda Sports Award: 2025
Medal record
Representing Colombia
Women's golf
Central American and Caribbean Games
Gold medal – first place	2023 San Salvador	Individual
South American Games
Gold medal – first place	2022 Asunción	Individual
Bronze medal – third place	2022 Asunción	Mixed team
Bolivarian Games
Gold medal – first place	2025 Lima-Ayacucho	Individual
Silver medal – second place	2025 Lima-Ayacucho	Mixed team
World Junior Championships
Silver medal – second place	2022 Markham	Individual

María José Marín (born 17 July 2006) is a Colombian amateur golfer. She was semifinalist at the 2022 U.S. Girls' Junior and 2024 U.S. Women's Amateur before winning the 2025 NCAA Individual Championship and 2026 Augusta National Women's Amateur.

== Amateur career ==
Marín won the South American Girls Championship (Campeonato Sudamericano Juvenil) in 2021 and 2022, and later won the South American Women's Amateur (Abierto Sudamericano Amateur) in 2024 and 2025. She was also runner-up at the R&A's Women's Amateur Latin America in 2021 and 2022 before winning in 2026.

Marín represented Colombia at the 2022 Espirito Santo Trophy in France, the Junior Golf World Cup in Japan, the Spirit International Amateur in Texas, and the 2022 World Junior Girls Championship in Canada, where she was the runner-up behind Cayetana Fernández. She was a semifinalist at the 2022 U.S. Girls' Junior. She won the 2023 Mexican Women's Amateur by four strokes. She won medalist honors at the 2024 U.S. Women's Amateur at Southern Hills and dominated her way into the semifinals of match play, where she had to withdraw due to injury.

At the Augusta National Women's Amateur, she became the first Latin American to make the cut to play at Augusta National Golf Club in 2023, and shot a 68 to win the event by four strokes ahead of Andrea Revuelta in 2026.

== College career ==
Marín enrolled at the University of Arkansas in 2023. Playing with the Arkansas Razorbacks women's golf team, she was named the SEC Freshman of the Year, WGCA First Team All-American, and to the WGCA All-Freshman Team, after shooting four rounds under par to tie for 4th at the 2024 NCAA Individual Championship. As a sophomore she won the 2025 NCAA Individual Championship and was named SEC Player of the Year, joining Stacy Lewis (2007) and María Fassi (2019) as the Razorbacks’ individual champions. The win earned her a spot in 2025 U.S. Women's Open.

In 2024, she finished tied 17th at the Walmart NW Arkansas Championship on the LPGA Tour. She was selected to play in the Arnold Palmer Cup in 2024 and 2025.

== Amateur wins ==
- 2018 Torneo Aficionado Shalom, Abierto del Caribe
- 2019 Torneo Aficionado Manizales, Torneo Aficionado Shalom
- 2020 1° Torneo Prejuvenil Y Juvenil, Master Internacional Infantil Y Juvenil
- 2021 Master Internacional Infantil Y Juvenil, DJCG Semana Santa Championship, Florida Junior Match Play Championship, Optimist International Junior Golf Championship (U18), Nacional Juvenil Match Play Copa Eduardo Herrera Torneo Infantil y Juvenil Militar, Abierto de Golf Club Campestre de Ibague, Abierto de Golf Club Campestre de Ibague, South American Girls Championship
- 2022 Junior Orange Bowl International, Torneo Aficionado de Golf (La Pradera), Torneo Infantil y Juvenil Militar, Master Internacional Infantil Y Juvenil, South American Girls Championship, Torneo Internacional Infantil y Juvenil Cartagena, Abierto de Golf Ciudad de Bucaramanga, Colombian Women's Amateur, Golf Club Campestre Guaymaral Anniversary Tournament, Juegos Suramericanos Asuncion, Campeonato Nacional DJCG Copa Eduardo Herrera
- 2023 Mexican Women's Amateur, Internacional de Menores de Lima Golf Club, Campeonato Nacional DJCG Copa Juan Sebastian Munoz, Campeonato Nacional DJCG Copa Hatogrande, Nico Open, Colombian Women's Amateur, Blessings Collegiate Invitational
- 2024 South American Women's Amateur, Colombian Women's Amateur, Blessings Collegiate Invitational
- 2025 South American Women's Amateur, Purdue Puerto Rico Classic, NCAA Championship, Women's Amateur Latin America
- 2026 Augusta National Women's Amateur

== Results in LPGA majors ==
Tournament	2025	2026
Chevron Championship		
U.S. Women's Open	55	T8
Women's PGA Championship		
The Evian Championship	T70	T57
Women's British Open		CUT

Top 10
Did not play

"T" = tied

== Team appearances ==
Amateur

- World Junior Girls Golf Championship (representing Colombia): 2022
- Junior Golf World Cup (representing Colombia): 2022, 2023
- Espirito Santo Trophy (representing Colombia): 2022
- Arnold Palmer Cup (representing the International team): 2024, 2025 (winners), 2026 (winners)
- Spirit International Amateur (representing Colombia): 2024
