= Virginia Elena Carta =

Italian professional golfer

Personal information
- Nationality: Italy
- Born: 24 December 1996 (age 29) Milan, Italy
- Height: 5 ft 5 in (1.65 m)

Career
- Sport: Golf
- College: Duke University; Cambridge University
- Turned professional: 2021
- Current tour: Ladies European Tour (joined 2022)

Best results in LPGA major championships
- Chevron Championship: DNP
- Women's PGA C'ship: DNP
- U.S. Women's Open: CUT: 2017
- Women's British Open: DNP
- Evian Championship: DNP

Achievements and awards
- Honda Sports Award: 2016
Medal record
Youth Olympic Games
Bronze medal – third place	2014 Nanjing	Mixed team

Virginia Elena Carta (born 24 December 1996) is an Italian professional golfer who plays on the Ladies European Tour. She won the 2016 NCAA Women's Championship individually and received the Honda Sports Award.

== Amateur career ==
Carta was born in Milan on Christmas Eve in 1996 and grew up in Udine, Italy, where she was introduced to golf by her mother at a young age.

She became a member of the Italian National Team in 2010, and won the 2012 European Young Masters in a team with Renato Paratore. She won silver at the 2014 European Girls' Team Championship in Slovakia, and at the 2014 Summer Youth Olympics in Nanjing she finished T4 individually and won the mixed team bronze with Renato Paratore.

Carta was successful in tournaments across Europe and won the Austrian International Amateur, German Girls Open, Slovenian Amateur Championship, French International Lady Juniors Amateur Championship and the French International Ladies Amateur Championship.

She played in both Annika Invitational Europe and Annika Invitational USA, and recruited Annika Sörenstam as her mentor.

In 2015, she accepted a golf scholarship to Duke University. As a freshman, she won the 2016 NCAA Women's Championship individually with an NCAA record score of 272 (−16), and won the 2016 Honda Sports Award as Player of the Year nationally. She fell to Seong Eun-jeong in the final of the 2016 U.S. Women's Amateur, 1 up. Invited to play the 2016 LPGA Marathon Classic she made the cut, but missed the cut in the 2017 U.S. Women's Open.

Carta battled injury during the 2016–17 and 2017-18 academic years, and won only the 2017 The Landfall Tradition, before winning the 2019 NCAA Women's Championship with the Duke Blue Devils women's golf team. She is one of only 20 golfers in NCAA history, male or female, to win both an NCAA Individual and team championship.

After graduating from Duke in 2019, Carta made the unusual decision to defer qualifying for the LPGA Tour for a year, instead opting to do a Master's degree in Environmental Policy at Cambridge University, England. She planned to enter LPGA Q-School in 2020, which was cancelled due to the COVID-19 pandemic, leaving her without tour status.

== Professional career ==
Carta turned professional in 2021 and received six invitations to events on the Ladies European Tour. She missed the cut at her first event as a professional, the Ladies Italian Open, but soon finished tied 5th at the VP Bank Swiss Ladies Open and tied 6th at the Lacoste Ladies Open de France. She finished T19 at LET Q-School in December to secure full playing rights for the 2022 season.

In 2022, she held a two-stroke lead at the Santander Golf Tour Málaga ahead of the final day, but produced a final round of 72 to finish runner-up, a stroke behind Sára Kousková. She finished 4th individually at Aramco Team Series - Jeddah and 5th in the LET Rookie of the Year rankings, won by Linn Grant.

Her best finish in 2023 was a tie for 4th at the Jabra Ladies Open. The same was true for 2024, where she tied for 4th at Lacoste Ladies Open de France and at the Wistron Ladies Open in Taiwan. She was the second highest ranked Italian golfer in the Women's World Golf Rankings and was the 4th reserve for the 2024 Summer Olympics, narrowly missing out on joining compatriot Alessandra Fanali in Paris.

== Amateur wins ==
- 2012 Citta di Milano Trofeo Gianni Albertini, Trofeo Umberto Agnelli
- 2013 Austrian International Amateur
- 2014 German Girls Open, Slovenian Amateur Championship, French International Lady Juniors Amateur Championship
- 2016 NCAA Women's Championship (individual)
- 2017 The Landfall Tradition
- 2018 French International Ladies Amateur Championship

== Team appearances ==
Amateur

- European Young Masters (representing Italy): 2011, 2012 (winners)
- European Girls' Team Championship (representing Italy): 2011, 2012, 2013, 2014
- European Ladies' Team Championship (representing Italy): 2015, 2018
- Junior Solheim Cup (representing Europe): 2013
- Junior Ryder Cup (representing Europe): 2014
- Espirito Santo Trophy (representing Europe): 2014
- Youth Olympic Games (representing Italy): 2014
- Vagliano Trophy (representing Europe): 2017 (winners)
