= Andrea Gaston =

American amateur golfer

Andrea Gaston is an American amateur golfer and former head coach for both the USC Trojans and Texas A&M Aggies women's golf teams.

She qualified to play in the U.S. Women's Open in 1977. She left the game in 1978 and returned in 1992, winning the California Women's Amateur Championship in 1993. She won the tournament again in 1994, becoming the first back to back winner of the tournament since Patty Sheehan. The same year, she again qualified for the U.S. Women's Open.

Gatson was hired as the head coach of the USC Trojans women's golf for the 1996–97 season. She coached the team for 22 years, leading them to three national titles. She left the Trojans to become the head coach of the Texas A&M Aggies women's golf team in 2018. She was replaced by Gerrod Chadwel as head coach in 2022.
