= María Fassi =

Mexican professional golfer (born 1998)

Personal information
- Full name: María José Fassi Álvarez
- Nationality: Mexico
- Born: 25 March 1998 (age 28) Pachuca, Mexico
- Height: 5 ft 9 in (175 cm)

Career
- Sport: Golf
- College: University of Arkansas
- Turned professional: 2019
- Current tour: LPGA Tour (joined 2019)
- Professional wins: 1

Best results in LPGA major championships
- Chevron Championship: 71st: 2020
- Women's PGA C'ship: T48: 2019
- U.S. Women's Open: T12: 2019
- Women's British Open: CUT: 2019, 2020, 2023
- Evian Championship: T15: 2021

Achievements and awards
- SEC Women's Golfer of the Year: 2018, 2019
- SEC Female Athlete of the Year: 2019
- WGCA Player of the Year: 2019
- Honda Sports Award: 2019

María José Fassi Álvarez (Note: In this Spanish name, the first or paternal surname is Fassi and the second or maternal family name is Álvarez.) (born 25 March 1998) is a Mexican professional golfer who plays on the U.S.-based LPGA Tour. She won the 2019 NCAA Division I Women's Championship.

Born in Pachuca, Hidalgo, she is the daughter of Argentine soccer coach Andrés Fassi. Her brother, Sebastián Fassi, is a professional soccer player.

== Amateur career ==
Fassi represented Mexico at the 2014 Summer Youth Olympics and won the Mexican Women's Amateur in 2015, 2016 and 2018. In 2015, she won the Spirit International Amateur in Texas, and was runner-up in the South American Women's Amateur and at the Dixie Amateur, behind Lauren Stephenson.

Fassi attended the University of Arkansas from 2015 to 2019 and played with the Arkansas Razorbacks women's golf team. As a junior she was WGCA First-Team All-American, SEC Women's Golfer of the Year and ANNIKA Award winner. As a senior she won the 2019 NCAA Division I Women's Championship individual title, was Ping WGCA Player of the Year and SEC Female Athlete of the Year, and received the Honda Sports Award.

She received sponsor's exemption to the Walmart NW Arkansas Championship in 2016 and 2018 and in total made six starts on the LPGA Tour as an amateur, including a T15 finish at the 2016 Lorena Ochoa Invitational.

Fassi played in the 2018 Arnold Palmer Cup and finished runner-up behind Jennifer Kupcho at the inaugural Augusta National Women's Amateur in 2019.

== Professional career ==
Fassi, who earned her LPGA Tour card in December 2018 deferred membership until she was done with college, competed as an amateur and turned professional in May 2019, making her professional debut at the 2019 U.S. Women's Open where she finished T12.

Waiting for the 2020 LPGA Tour to resume following the coronavirus pandemic break, Fassi decided to keep her game sharp by entering the Cooper Communities NWA Classic, a Women's All Pro Tour event in Arkansas. She claimed a wire-to-wire, four-shot victory, her first as a professional.

In 2021, Fassi was runner-up at the Dubai Moonlight Classic a stroke behind Bronte Law, and in 2022 she finished 3rd behind Ally Ewing and Lin Xiyu at the Kroger Queen City Championship.

== Amateur wins ==
- 2013 Mexican Junior Championship
- 2014 Campeonato Argentino de Aficionadas
- 2015 Women's Mexican Amateur, Spirit International Amateur (individual)
- 2016 Women's Mexican Amateur, Lady Puerto Rico Classic, Annika Intercollegiate
- 2017 Mason Rudolph Women's Championship, Annika Intercollegiate
- 2018 Women's Mexican Amateur, Lady Puerto Rico Classic, Darius Rucker Intercollegiate, Evans Derby Experience, SEC Championship, NCAA Austin Regional
- 2019 SEC Championship, NCAA Women's Division I Championship (individual)

== Professional wins (1) ==
=== Other wins (1) ===
- 2020 Cooper Communities NWA Classic (Women's All Pro Tour)

== Results in LPGA majors ==
Results not in chronological order.

Tournament	2015	2016	2017	2018	2019	2020	2021	2022	2023	2024	2025
Chevron Championship				CUT		71	CUT		CUT	CUT	
U.S. Women's Open	CUT			CUT	T12	CUT			CUT		CUT
Women's PGA Championship					T48	T54	CUT	CUT	T61	T60	
The Evian Championship					CUT	NT	T15				
Women's British Open					CUT	CUT			CUT		

Did not play

CUT = missed the half-way cut
NT = no tournament
T= tied

=== Summary ===
Tournament	Wins	2nd	3rd	Top-5	Top-10	Top-25	Events	Cuts made
Chevron Championship	0	0	0	0	0	0	5	1
U.S. Women's Open	0	0	0	0	0	1	6	1
Women's PGA Championship	0	0	0	0	0	0	6	4
The Evian Championship	0	0	0	0	0	1	2	1
Women's British Open	0	0	0	0	0	0	3	0
Totals	0	0	0	0	0	2	22	7

- Most consecutive cuts made – 2 (twice)

== Team appearances ==
Amateur

- Junior Golf World Cup (representing Mexico): 2015
- World Junior Girls Championship (representing Mexico): 2015
- Spirit International Amateur (representing Mexico): 2015
- Espirito Santo Trophy (representing Mexico): 2016, 2018
- Arnold Palmer Cup (representing the International team): 2018

== Collegiate honors ==
- 2018 WGCA First-team All-American
- 2018 First-team All-SEC
- 2018 SEC Women's Golf Player of the Year
- 2018 ANNIKA Award winner
- 2019 Honda Sport Award for Golf winner
- 2019 ANNIKA Award winner
- 2019 Ping WGCA Player of the Year
- 2019 SEC Female Athlete of the Year
- 2019 WGCA First-team All-American
- 2019 Golfweek First-team All-American
- 2019 SEC Women's Golf Player of the Year
- 2019 First-team All-SEC
- 2019 WGCA All-American Scholar
