= Page Dunlap =

American golfer (born 1965)

Personal information
- Full name: E. Page Dunlap Halpin
- Nationality: United States
- Born: December 16, 1965 (age 60) Harrisonburg, Virginia, U.S.

Career
- Sport: Golf
- College: University of Florida
- Turned professional: 1987
- Former tours: Futures Tour (1987–91); LPGA Tour (1991–97)
- Professional wins: 5

Number of wins by tour
- Epson Tour: 5

Best results in LPGA major championships
- Chevron Championship: CUT: 1987
- Women's PGA C'ship: T35: 1994
- U.S. Women's Open: 64th: 1997
- du Maurier Classic: 16th: 1994
- Women's British Open: DNP

Achievements and awards
- First-team All-American: 1986
- Broderick Award: 1986

E. Page Halpin (born December 16, 1965), née E. Page Dunlap, is an American former professional golfer who was a member of the LPGA Tour for six years during the 1990s. Dunlap is best known for winning the individual NCAA Division I Championship in 1986.

== Early life ==
In 1965, Dunlap was born in Harrisonburg, Virginia. Her brother is Scott Dunlap, who became a professional golfer. Dunlap attended Sarasota High School in Sarasota, Florida and played for the high school golf team. She was the state high school golf championship runner-up twice: as a junior in 1982 and again as a senior in 1983.

Dunlap also found success as a junior amateur golfer by winning the 1982 Orange Bowl Junior Tournament and the 1983 American Junior Golf Association tournament. In 1983, she graduated from Sarasota High.

== Amateur career ==
Dunlap accepted an athletic scholarship to attend the University of Florida in Gainesville, Florida, where her older brother, Scott Dunlap, was already a member of the Florida Gators men's golf team. She played for coach Mimi Ryan's Florida Gators women's golf team in National Collegiate Athletic Association (NCAA) competition from 1984 to 1987, and was a member of the Lady Gators' back-to-back NCAA championship teams in 1985 and 1986. Dunlap was also a three-time collegiate tournament medalist, which included winning the Florida Intercollegiate Golf Championship in 1985, and shooting a 72-hole score of 291 to win the individual NCAA Division I Championship by a single stroke in 1986. She was a second-team All-American in 1985, a first-team All-American in 1986, and won the Broderick Award for Golf as the nation's outstanding female collegiate golfer in 1985–86.

In 1987, Dunlap graduated from the University of Florida with a bachelor's degree in exercise and sports science.

== Professional career ==
After turning professional, Dunlap played on the Futures Tour and won five tournaments. She then played on the LPGA Tour for six years (1991–1997), and had several top-ten finishes, but never won an individual Tour event. Her best finishes in the LPGA majors included a tie for thirty-fifth in the 1994 LPGA Championship, sixty-fourth in the 1997 U.S. Women's Open, and sixteenth in the 1994 du Maurier Classic. Dunlap's career earnings as a professional golfer totaled over $210,000; her best earnings year was 1993, when she won $59,053.

From 1998 to 2000, Dunlap served as the head coach of the Vanderbilt Commodores women's golf team, and one of her team members was the first-ever Vanderbilt University golfer to qualify for the NCAA Women's Golf Championship tournament as an individual. Dunlap left Vanderbilt to return to Florida to get married in 2000.

== Awards and honors ==
- In 1998, Dunlap was inducted into the University of Florida Athletic Hall of Fame as a "Gator Great."
- Dunlap has been inducted into the National Golf Coaches Association (NGCA) Players Hall of Fame as well.

== Amateur wins ==
- 1982 Orange Bowl Junior Tournament
- 1983 American Junior Golf Association Tournament
- 1984 AJGA Tournament of Champions
- 1985 Florida Intercollegiate Championship
- 1986 NCAA Division I Championship
- 2011 Florida Amateur

== Professional wins (5) ==
=== Futures Tour wins (5) ===
- 1988 (3) Costa Del Sol Classic, Turkey Creek Classic, Shalimar Classic
- 1990 (2) Lake Eufaula Futures Classic, Cellular One Futures Classic

== See also ==
- List of Florida Gators women's golfers on the LPGA Tour
- List of University of Florida alumni
- List of University of Florida Athletic Hall of Fame members
