= 2015 NCAA Division I women's golf championship =

2015 NCAA Division I Women's Golf Championship
Tournament information
- Dates: May 22–27, 2015
- Location: Bradenton, Florida, U.S.
- Course: The Concession Golf Club (University of South Florida)
- Organized by: NCAA

Statistics
- Par: 72
- Length: 6,648 yards
- Field: 132 players, 24 teams

Champion
- Team: Stanford; Individual: Emma Talley (Alabama)
- Team: 3–2 vs. Baylor; Individual: 285 (−3)

The 2015 NCAA Division I Women's Golf Championship was the 34th annual tournament to determine the national champions of NCAA Division I women's collegiate golf. It was contested May 22–27, 2015, at The Concession Golf Club in Bradenton, Florida. The tournament was hosted by the University of South Florida. Two championships were awarded: team and individual.

This was the first time that the men's and women's Division I golf tournaments were played at the same location; the 2015 NCAA Division I Men's Golf Championship will be held in Bradenton from May 29 to June 3.

== Regional qualifying tournaments ==
- Four regional qualifying tournaments were held across the United States from May 7–9, 2015.
- The six teams with the lowest team scores qualified from each of the four regional tournaments for both the team and individual national championships.
- The three individuals not affiliated with one of the other teams in their regional with the lowest score also qualified for the individual national championship.

Regional name	Location	Qualified teams^
Raleigh	Raleigh, North Carolina	South Carolina, Northwestern, NC State, Alabama, LSU, Campbell
South Bend	South Bend, Indiana	Duke, Wake Forest, UC Davis, Arizona, Tulane, Purdue
San Antonio	San Antonio, Texas	Baylor, UCLA, Tennessee, Texas A&M, Washington, Texas Tech
St. George	St. George, Utah	Southern California, Stanford, Arkansas, UNLV, Virginia, California

^ Teams listed in qualifying order.

== Venue ==
This is the first NCAA Division I Women's Golf Championship held at The Concession Golf Club in Bradenton, Florida. This is the first time the tournament has been hosted by the University of South Florida.

== Format ==
For the first time in NCAA women's golf history the National Championship would follow the format used for the men's National Championship adopted in 2009. All teams played 54 holes with the team score consisting of the four best scores of the five-player team for each individual round. The top 15 teams and the top 9 individuals after 54 holes advanced to the fourth round. The top eight teams after 72 holes advanced to the match play competition. The individual award was given at the end of the stroke play part of the competition, recognizing the individual who had the best combined score over the four rounds.

In match play, all five players play just as before and each match is worth one point with matches that end all-square are either postponed then continued, continued immediately or called a halve depending on the scores for both teams. For example, if Team A ties with Team B 2.5–2.5, the match that was all-square after 18 holes resumes in a sudden-death playoff.

== Team competition ==
=== Leaderboard ===
Place	Team	Round 1	Round 2	Round 3	Round 4	Total	To par
1	Southern California	297	303	298	294	1192	+40
2	Duke	293	309	292	303	1197	+45
3	Baylor	297	307	306	288	1198	+46
4	Stanford	293	323	296	287	1199	+47
5	Arizona	300	311	294	300	1205	+53
T6	Tennessee	301	309	300	302	1212	+60
T6	Texas Tech	319	294	307	292	1212	+60
8	Washington	301	316	297	300	1214	+62
9	Arkansas	310	306	303	298	1217	+65
10	Northwestern	310	301	305	302	1218	+66
11	UC Davis	305	304	306	305	1220	+68
12	Purdue	307	302	302	311	1222	+70
13	Wake Forest	310	320	297	297	1224	+72
14	Alabama	310	307	310	299	1226	+74
15	UCLA	319	318	293	303	1233	+81

Remaining teams: UNLV (931), South Carolina (932), Texas A&M (933), Tulane (935), LSU (938), Virginia (938), NC State (942), Campbell (950), California (953).

After 54 holes, the field of 24 teams was cut to the top 15.

=== Match play bracket ===
- The eight teams with the lowest total scores advanced to the match play bracket.

Quarterfinals; May 26, morning
1	Southern California	3
8	Washington	2
4	Stanford	4
5	Arizona	1
3	Baylor	3.5
6	Tennessee	1.5
2	Duke	4
7	Texas Tech	1

Semifinals; May 26, afternoon
1	Southern California	2
4	Stanford	3
3	Baylor	3
2	Duke	2

Final; May 27
4	Stanford	3
3	Baylor	2

== Individual competition ==
Place	Player	University	Score	To par
1	Emma Talley	Alabama	70-73-73-69=285	−3
T2	Gaby López	Arkansas	70-76-74-66=286	−2
T2	Leona Maguire	Duke	71-74-73-68=286	−2
4	Dylan Kim	Baylor	73-76-72-67=288	E
5	Monica Vaughn	Arizona State	75-71-71-72=289	+1
6	Mariah Stackhouse	Stanford	68-78-75-70=291	+3
T7	A. J. Newell	Tennessee	73-73-76-70=292	+4
T7	Lauren Kim	Stanford	71-80-72-69=292	+4
9	Silvia Garces	Tulane	74-75-73-71=293	+5
T10	Suchaya Tangkamolprasert	Northwestern	73-74-76-72=295	+7
T10	Gabriella Then	Southern California	75-74-73-73=295	+7

The field was cut after 54 holes to the top 15 teams and the top nine individuals not on a top 15 team. These 84 players competed for the individual championship.

== See also ==
- 2015 NCAA Division I Men's Golf Championship
