= Florida State Seminoles women's golf =

Golf team representing Florida State University

- University: Florida State University
- Conference: ACC
- Head coach: Women's: Amy Bond (12th season)
- Location: Tallahassee, Florida
- Course: Don A. Veller Seminole Golf Course; Par: 73; Yards: 7,147
- Nickname: Florida State Seminoles
- Colors: Garnet and gold

NCAA Championship appearances
- 1991, 1992, 1993, 1994, 1995, 1996, 1997, 1999, 2001, 2002, 2003, 2004, 2006, 2007, 2008, 2009, 2010, 2011, 2012, 2013, 2014, 2016, 2017, 2018, 2019, 2021, 2022, 2024, 2025, 2026

Conference champions
- Metro; 1988, 1989, 1991; ACC; 2025

The Florida State Seminoles women's golf team represents Florida State University (variously Florida State or FSU) in the sport of golf. The Seminoles compete in Division I of the National Collegiate Athletic Association (NCAA) and the Atlantic Coast Conference (ACC). They play their home matches on the Don A. Veller Seminole Golf Course on the university's Tallahassee, Florida campus, and are currently led by head coach Amy Bond.

== History ==
In the 50-year history of the Seminoles' women's golf program, they have won four conference championships and one national championship. One Seminole, Mirabel Ting, has won the Annika Award.

Alumni who have gone on to represent Florida State University with wins on the LPGA Tour include Karen Stupples, Jane Geddes, Colleen Walker, Lisa Walters, and Kris Tamulis.

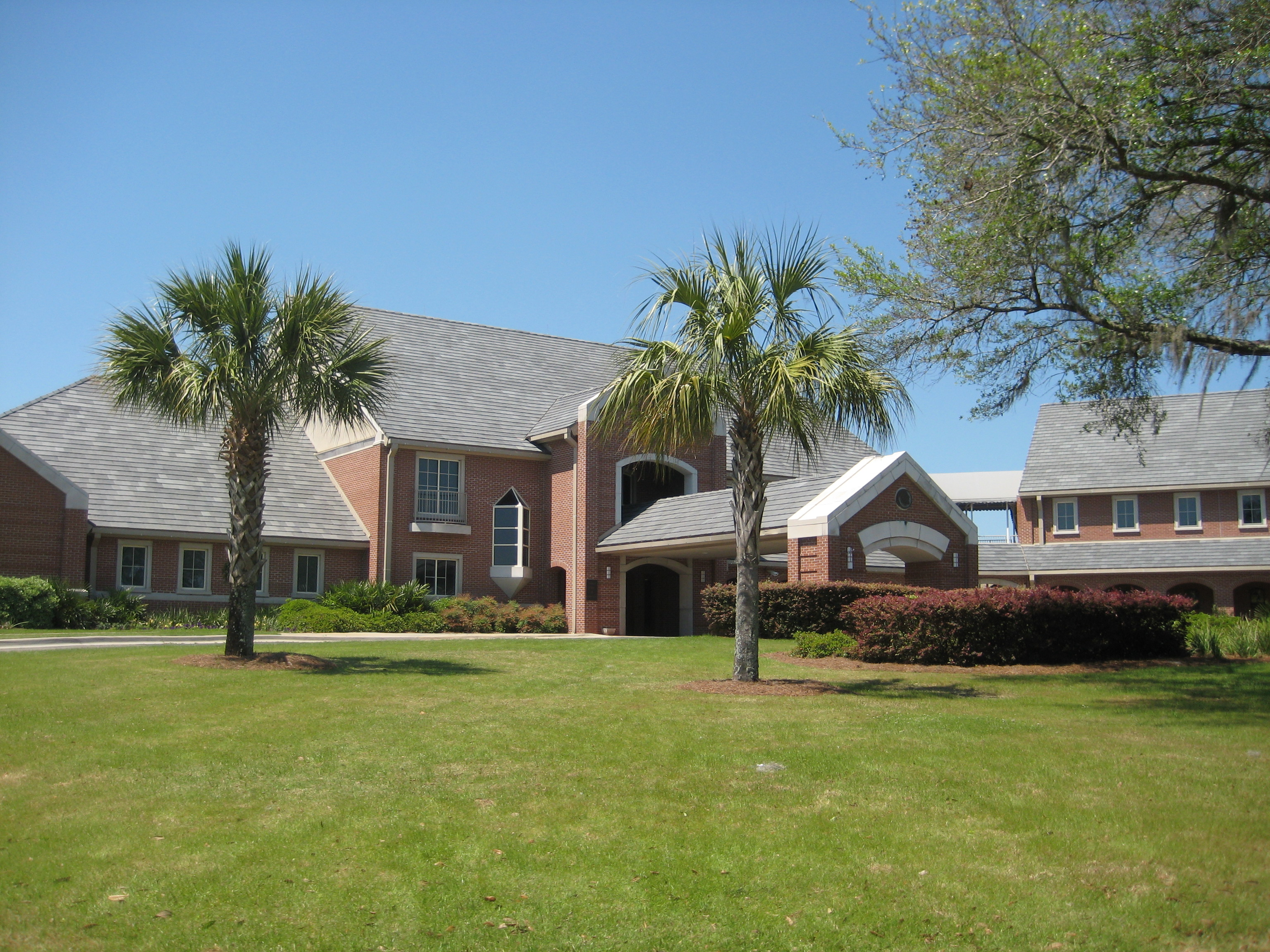
The Don A. Veller Seminole Golf Course, home course of the Florida State Seminoles men's and women's golf teams

The Dave Middleton Golf Complex and the Don Veller Seminole Golf Course are home to the PGA Golf Management Program. In 2017, the University announced that Nicklaus Design had been hired to renovate the course at a cost of $4–6 million. The renovation created one of the top university courses in the country, Seminole Legacy Golf Club.

== Honors ==
- ACC Golfer of the Year
  - Frida Kinhult (2019)
  - Beatrice Wallin (2021)
  - Lottie Woad (2024)
  - Mirabel Ting (2025)
- ACC Coach of the Year
  - Debbie Dillman (1992)
  - Amy Bond (2017, 2025)

== See also ==
- Florida State Seminoles
- Florida State Seminoles men's golf
