= Tennessee Volunteers women's golf =

- Founded: 1993
- University: University of Tennessee
- Conference: SEC
- Athletic director: Danny White
- Head coach: Diana Cantú (5th season)
- Location: Knoxville, Tennessee
- Course: Mack and Jonnie Day Golf Facility
- Nickname: Lady Volunteers
- Colors: Orange, white, and smokey gray

NCAA match play
- 2015

NCAA Championship appearances
- 1994, 1997, 2000, 2004, 2005, 2006, 2007, 2009, 2010, 2011, 2012, 2015, 2016, 2019, 2025, 2026

NCAA regional appearances
- 1993, 1994, 1995, 1996, 1997, 1998, 1999, 2000, 2001, 2002, 2003, 2004, 2005, 2006, 2007, 2008, 2009, 2010, 2011, 2012, 2013, 2014, 2015, 2016, 2017, 2018, 2019, 2021, 2023, 2024, 2025, 2026

Conference champions
- 2026

Individual conference champions
- Katharina Larsson 1994; Erica Popson 2011

The Tennessee Volunteers women's golf team represents the University of Tennessee located in Knoxville, Tennessee. The Vols compete at the Division I level of the National Collegiate Athletic Association (NCAA) and the Southeastern Conference (SEC). The Vols currently rotate between 16 different golf courses located in the state of Tennessee. The current coach for the Lady Volunteers is Diana Cantu who began in 2022. Until the 2022 season, the Lady Vols had appeared in an NCAA regional every year since the program began in 1993, and they were one of only 9 NCAA Division 1 teams to compete in every NCAA regional since the championship’s format was established. Overall the Lady Vols have competed in 31 NCAA Regionals and 15 NCAA Championships.

== History ==
Despite the SEC beginning to sponsor women's golf in 1980-81, Tennessee did not sponsor the sport at the varsity level for 12 more years until 1992-93. The Lady Vols were the last team in the SEC to begin play except for Arkansas who had their first season in time for the 1995-96 season. All-time the Lady Vols are tied for 6th in the SEC (with Texas A&M and Alabama) for most appearances (14) in the NCAA Championships behind Florida, Georgia, South Carolina, Auburn, and LSU. Their best finish nationally came at the 2000 and 2015 NCAA Championships where both teams finished 5th overall. The program is one of only two at Tennessee (the other being women's tennis) to never win a conference title. The Lady Vols have finished 2nd three times at the SEC Championships (1993, 1999, 2006), and won two NCAA Regionals. They were one of only 9 nationwide to qualify for every NCAA Regional until they failed to do so in the 2022 season. Additionally, the women's golf team posted winning seasons each year from inception until 2013-14, and have only had 6 losing seasons ever.

=== Judi Pavón era ===
Judi Pavón took over the helm of the Lady Vol golf team in 2000. She has led the team to 18 straight NCAA regional appearances and 11 appearances in the NCAA Championships. From (2004-2007) Pavón lead the Lady Vols to the final rounds of the NCAA Championships. One of the best seasons in program history was in 2005 when they won the 2005 NCAA West regional and finished 6th at the NCAA Championships. In the 2006 season they won the NCAA East regional and finshied tied for 13th at the NCAA Championships. The Lady Vols had another record setting season in 2015, when they finished 5th at the NCAA tournament tying a program record. They would return to the NCAA Championships in 2016 and in 2019. Pavon retired and was replaced by former Maryland head coach and lady-vol player from 2006-2010, Diana Cantú.

=== Diana Cantú era ===
Before returning to Tennessee, where Cantú played from 2006-2010, she served as head coach of the Maryland Terrapins for seven seasons. There, she earned Big 10 coach of the year honors after taking the Terrapins to their best ever finish at the Big 10 Championships (2nd) and their first ever NCAA Championship appearance in 2021. In her first season as head coach (2021-2022), the Lady Vols struggled to a 41-95-2 record and an 8th place SEC finish. Despite advancing to match play for the first time at SECs, the year ended with the Lady Vols failing to qualify for NCAA Regionals for the first time in program history. In Cantú's second season at the helm, she led the Lady Vols to an 11th place finish at the SEC Championship and back to the NCAA Regionals as a #7 seed. Cantú guided the Lady Vols back to the NCAA Championship's in 2025, her fourth season, marking the programs first Championship appearance since 2019.

== Yearly record ==
Season	Coach	Overall				Conference				Conference Championship	NCAA Regional	NCAA Championships
Season	Coach	Won	Lost	Tie	%	Won	Lost	Tie	%	Conference Championship	NCAA Regional	NCAA Championships
Southeastern Conference
1992–1993	Linda Franz	105	41	4	.700	34	14	–	.708	2nd (611)	T–8th (936)	–
1993–1994	Linda Franz-Cook	119	44	–	.730	36	8	–	.818	4th (902)	5th (938)	12th (1258)
1994–1995	Linda Franz-Cook	85	62	1	.574	25	12	–	.676	5th (942)	8th (921)	–
1995–1996	Lori Brock	114	38	2	.740	23	12	–	.657	5th (618)	9th (931)	–
1996–1997	Lori Brock	147	32	0	.821	46	7	–	.868	6th (916)	2nd (944)	6th (1197)
1997–1998	Lori Brock	93	48	2	.650	32	13	–	.711	4th (919)	12th (927)	–
1998–1999	Lori Brock	91	56	1	.615	33	15	–	.688	2nd (905)	T–13th (920)	–
1999–2000	Brock/Pavón	87	43	–	.669	45	20	–	.692	3rd (925)	4th (902)	5th (1206)
2000–2001	Judi Pavón	155	40	–	.795	36	9	–	.800	6th (897)	11th (926)	–
2001–2002	Judi Pavón	101	49	2	.664	25	18	–	.581	3rd (866)	10th (896)	–
2002–2003	Judi Pavón	116	46	1	.712	36	9	–	.800	3rd (911)	18th (948)	–
2003–2004	Judi Pavón	97	70	3	.571	27	20	2	.571	4th (882)	7th (918)	11th (1193)
2004–2005	Judi Pavón	142	43	7	.740	26	6	–	.813	T–4th (906)	T–1st (889)	T–6th (1187)
2005–2006	Judi Pavón	123	60	1	.668	32	17	–	.653	2nd (876)	1st (864)	T–13th (1209)
2006–2007	Judi Pavón	145	55	3	.714	42	17	1	.708	3rd (886)	7th (893)	T–17th (1236)
2007–2008	Judi Pavón	93	73	2	.554	17	28	–	.378	8th (931)	16th (929)	–
2008–2009	Judi Pavón	98	90	–	.521	25	28	–	.472	4th (881)	3rd (873)	17th (1237)
2009–2010	Judi Pavón	137	72	2	.649	36	19	–	.654	9th (887)	2nd (866)	T–19th (1199)
2010–2011	Judi Pavón	132	61	1	.680	41	38	–	.519	6th (895)	2nd (876)	13th (1200)
2011–2012	Judi Pavón	114	71	4	.603	28	36	2	.440	11th (951)	4th (904)	19th (1200)
2012–2013	Judi Pavón	84	73	2	.528	22	37	–	.373	9th (929)	9th (929)	–
2013–2014	Judi Pavón	61	108	–	.361	13	35	–	.271	13th (921)	16th (942)	–
2014–2015	Judi Pavón	151	34	–	.816	31	10	–	.756	4th (878)	3rd (850)	5th (1212)
2015–2016	Judi Pavón	95	78	–	.549	28	29	–	.491	8th (896)	5th (912)	16th (885)
2016–2017	Judi Pavón	87	58	4	.584	21	21	1	.500	7th (863)	8th (890)	–
2017–2018	Judi Pavón	73	81	2	.468	14	30	2	.326	12th (918)	11th (878)	–
2018–2019	Judi Pavón	100	73	2	.571	11	23	–	.324	10th (897)	6th (876)	24th (950)
2019–2020	Judi Pavón	55	91	0	.377	3	16	–	.158	N/A	N/A	N/A
2020–2021	Judi Pavón	53	85	4	.373	33	66	3	.338	T–9th (853)	10th (882)	–
2021–2022	Diana Cantú	41	95	2	.304	8	34	2	.205	8th (887) Quarterfinals	–	–
2022–2023	Diana Cantú	74	84	4	.469	7	26	1	.221	T–11th (905)	T–7th (863)	–
2023–2024	Diana Cantú	95	66	2	.590	7	27	–	.206	9th (863)	6th (867)	–
Total		3263	2020	58	.616	843	700	14	.546	0 SEC; Championships	31 Regional; Appearances	15 NCAA; Championship; Appearances

*Note: The 2019–20 season was suspended in mid-March 2020 and later canceled due to the coronavirus (COVID-19) global health crisis.

== National honors ==
Throughout the history of the Lady Vols golf program, 13 golfers have earned 29 All-America honors.

=== WGCA All-Americans ===
- Abby Pearson – 1993
- Katharina Larsson – 1994
- Erin Kurczewski – 1998
- Young-A Yang – 1999, 2000, 2001, and 2002
- Violeta Retamoza – 2003 and 2005
- Jessica Shepley – 2004
- Marci Turner – 2006 and 2007
- Nicole Smith – 2006
- Nathalie Mansson – 2010
- Erica Popson – 2011 and 2013
- AJ Newell – 2015
- Anna Newell – 2015 and 2016

=== Golf Week All-Americans ===
- Nicole Smith – 2007
- Marci Turner – 2008
- Nathalie Mansson – 2009 and 2010
- Erica Popson – 2011 and 2013
- Lucia Polo – 2015
- Anna Newell – 2016

== Individual honors ==
32 Lady Vols have garnered All-SEC honors throughout the women's golf history including two SEC Player of The Year awards and three Freshman of The Year awards.

=== SEC Player of The Year ===
- Katharina Larsson – 1994
- Violeta Retamoza – 2005

=== SEC Freshman of The Year ===
- Abby Pearson – 1993
- Young-A Yang – 1999
- Violeta Retamoza – 2003

== Mack and Jonnie Day Golf Facility ==
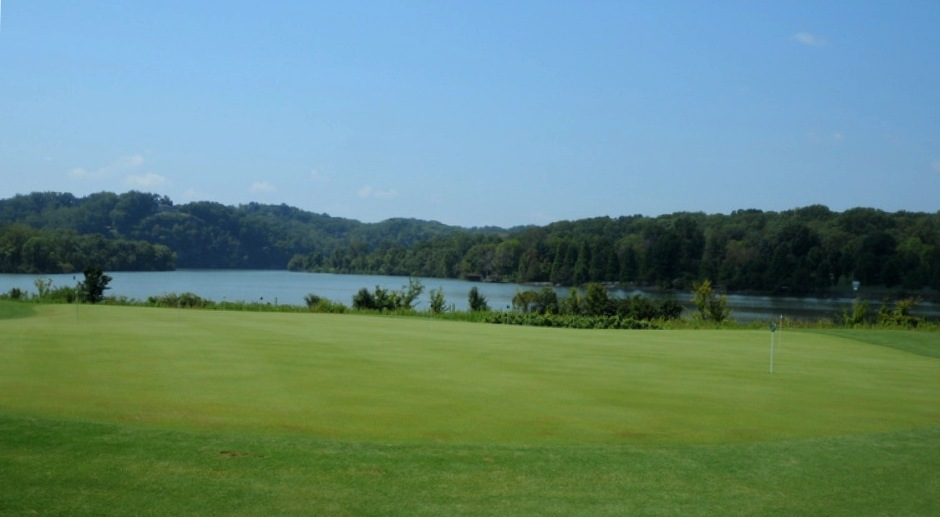
Mack and Jonnie Day Golf Facility course next to the Tennessee River.

Although the Vols men’s and women’s golf teams host their home matches at a variety of different courses in the state of Tennessee they have recently welcomed a new state of the art practice facility on campus where the team can practice all year round. The practice facility resides on a 28-acre lot across from the University's Medical Center and contains a 3-hole course plus putting green. The new facility opened in 2010 and was finished in 2019 with the Blackburn-Furrow Golf Clubhouse. The 8,300 square foot clubhouse features offices for both the men and women's teams, heated hitting bays for year-round practice, video training space, locker rooms, team lounges, over 1,200 square feet of outdoor deck spaces, and a virtual-putting green.

== See also ==
- Tennessee Volunteers
- Tennessee Volunteers men's golf
