= Florida Gators women's golf =

- University: University of Florida
- Conference: SEC
- Head coach: Women's: Emily Glaser (3rd season)
- Location: Gainesville, Florida
- Course: Mark Bostick Golf Course; Par: 70; Yards: 6,701
- Nickname: Florida Gators
- Colors: Orange and blue

NCAA champions
- 1985, 1986

NCAA individual champions
- Page Dunlap (1986)

NCAA match play
- 2017

NCAA Championship appearances
- 1982, 1983, 1984, 1985, 1986, 1987, 1988, 1989, 1990, 1991, 1994, 1996, 1997, 1998, 2000, 2002, 2003, 2005, 2006, 2008, 2011, 2012, 2013, 2014, 2016, 2017, 2026

Conference champions
- 1981, 1982, 1984, 1986, 1987, 1991, 1995, 2008, 2017

Individual conference champions
- Lynn Connelly (1981); Deb Richard (1982, 1983, 1984); Karen Davies (1986); Cheryl Morley (1988); Dina Taylor (1995); Aimee Cho (2003); Maria Torres (2016); Paula Francisco (2026)

The Florida Gators women's golf team represents the University of Florida in the sport of golf. The Lady Gators compete in Division I of the National Collegiate Athletic Association (NCAA) and the Southeastern Conference (SEC). They play their home matches on the Mark Bostick Golf Course on the university's Gainesville, Florida campus, and will be led by third-year coach Emily Glaser in 2014–15. In the 45 year history of the Gators women's golf program, the Lady Gators have won nine SEC championships and two NCAA national tournament championships.

== Team history ==
The Florida Gators women's golf program originated as an intercollegiate club team under coach Mimi Ryan in 1969. Ryan's Lady Gators were elevated to varsity status in 1972 with the expansion of the Gators women's sports program under former University of Florida athletic director Ray Graves and associate athletic director Ruth Alexander. The University of Florida embraced the challenge of creating a nationally recognized women's sports program, including women's golf, in order to comply with Title IX's federally mandated equal opportunities for women in college sports.

As one of the first Florida Gators women's sports teams, the Lady Gators golfers enjoyed almost immediate success in Association for Intercollegiate Athletics for Women (AIAW) competition. In the Lady Gators' first year as a varsity sports team, Ryan's Gators finished seventh at the AIAW national championship tournament, beginning a streak of nineteen consecutive top-ten finishes in the AIAW and NCAA national championship tournaments. Ryan's golfers finished second in the AIAW national championship tournament in 1978 and 1978.

The 1981–1982 school year was the transition year for sponsorship of national championship tournaments for women's college sports in the United States. During 1981–1982, both the AIAW and the NCAA sponsored championships; since 1982, only the NCAA has sponsored championships in women's college sports. The Lady Gators finished third in the last AIAW championship tournament, and fourth in the first NCAA championship tournament in 1982.

Under Ryan, the Lady Gators golf program peaked in the mid-1980s, when the women's golf team won two back-to-back NCAA tournament championships in 1985 and 1986. Led by senior Deb Richard in 1985, a Gators team that included Karen Davies, Lisa Stanley, Page Dunlap and Tammy Towles dominated the NCAA tournament field to win the program's first national championship by fifteen shots, and Richard missed winning the NCAA individual championship by a single shot.

Leading the team of Karen Davies, Lisa Nedoba, Cheryl Morley and Lisa Stanley to its second NCAA national tournament championship eight shots ahead of the runner-up team, junior Page Dunlap won the NCAA individual championship by a single stroke in 1986. For the first time in the history of college women's golf, all five starting members of the 1986 team received All-American honors.

The Southeastern Conference sanctioned women's golf as a conference sport in 1980, and the Lady Gators enjoyed immediate success against their SEC competition, winning eight SEC team championships (1981, 1982, 1984, 1986, 1987, 1991, 1995, 2008). Eight individual members of the Gators women's golf team have also won eight SEC individual titles, including Lynn Connelly (1981), Deb Richard (1982, 1983, 1984), Karen Davies (1986), Cheryl Morley (1988), Dina Taylor (1995), Aimee Cho (2003), Maria Torres (2016), and Paula Francisco (2026).

In 2011, coach Jan Dowling's Lady Gators tied for tenth place at the NCAA national championship tournament. The Gators finished twelfth at the 2012 NCAA national championship tournament.

== Individual honors ==
=== All-American ===
Eleven Lady Gators golfers have earned seventeen first-team All-American honors, including Beverley Davis (1976, 1979), Lori Garbacz (1978), Denise Hermida (1979), Laurie Rinker (1980, 1982), Deb Richard (1984, 1985), Laurie Burns (1984), Karen Davies (1986, 1987, 1988), Page Dunlap (1986), Cheryl Morley (1988, 1989), Riko Higashio (1998), and Sandra Gal (2007).

=== All-Southeastern Conference ===
Florida women's golf team members have received numerous first-team All-SEC honors, including Laurie Rinker (1982), Laurie Burns (1984), Karen Davies (1984, 1985, 1986, 1987), Page Dunlap (1986), Cheryl Morley (1987, 1988, 1989), Lisa Nedoba (1987), Lisa Hackney (1990), Laura Brown (1991), Dina Taylor (1993, 1994, 1995), Sarah Jones (1994), Kimberly Little (1994, 1995), Jeanne-Marie Busuttil (1995, 1996), Riko Higashio (1996, 1997, 1998), Sara Beautell (1997), Aimee Cho (2003, 2004), Sandra Gal (2007), Whitney Myers (2008), Jessica Yadloczky (2008, 2009), Hannah Yun (2008), Camilla Hedberg (2013), Maria Torres (2016, 2017), Kelly Grassel (2017), Maisie Filler (2024), Paula Francisco (2026), and Megan Propeck (2026).

=== Players Hall of Fame ===
The National Golf Coaches Association (NGCA) Players Hall of Fame recognizes the greatest women's college golfers; five Lady Gators have been inducted, including Donna Horton White (1987), Suzanne Jackson (1993), Cheryl Morley (2000), Deb Richard (2002) and Page Dunlap (2003).

== LPGA Tour professionals ==
Nineteen University of Florida alumnae have qualified as members of the LPGA Tour, including former Lady Gators Sandra Gal, Lori Garbacz, Lisa Hall, Donna Horton White, Deb Richard and Laurie Rinker.

== Coaching staff ==
Emily Glaser succeeded Dowling as the Lady Gators' head coach position following the 2012 season. The 2014–15 season will be her third. She is supported by assistant coach Ashley Sease.

== Mark Bostick Golf Course ==
The Gators women's golf team hosts its home matches at the Mark Bostick Golf Course, located on 110 acres (0.45 km^{2}) of the university's campus in Gainesville, Florida. The university course was originally designed by noted Scottish golfer and golf course architect Donald Ross in 1921. It was partially redesigned and rebuilt by noted golf architect Bobby Weed as part of a $4 million renovation project in 2001. The renovated course is a 6,701-yard par 70, and the facilities include the Guy Bostick club house and dedicated practice areas for the Gators women's golf team.

The course hosts the annual Lady Gator Invitational tournament, and has also served as the site for the NCAA Regional women's tournament.

== See also ==
- Florida Gators
- Florida Gators men's golf
- History of the University of Florida
- List of University of Florida Athletic Hall of Fame members
- University Athletic Association
