= Arkansas Razorbacks women's golf =

Women's golf team representing the University of Arkansas

The Arkansas Razorback women's golf team represents the University of Arkansas in the sport of golf. The Razorbacks compete in Division I of the National Collegiate Athletic Association (NCAA) and the Southeastern Conference (SEC). They play their home events on the Blessings Golf Course near the Fayetteville, Arkansas campus. They are coached by Shauna Estes-Taylor.

== Team history ==
The Razorback women's golf team began in 1996–97 when Director of Women's Athletics Bev Lewis, added the program for the then-separate Women's Athletics Department. Since that time, Arkansas has made 12 NCAA Regional appearances and six NCAA Championship appearances. The Razorbacks' most famous alum is LPGA Tour member Stacy Lewis.

== All-American ==
Four Razorback women's golfers have earned 10 Duramed Futures Tour National Golf Coaches Association All-America honors. They include Stacy Lewis (2005 1st team, 2006 Hon. Mention, 2007 1st team, 2008 1st team), Amanda McCurdy (2006 Hon. Mention), Kelli Shean (2010 2nd team, 2011 Hon. Mention), and Emily Tubert (2011 1st team, 2012 1st team, 2013 Hon. Mention).

=== All-Southeastern Conference ===
Eight Arkansas Razorback women's golf team members have been honored by the Southeastern Conference:

Emma Lavy

- 2011 SEC All-Freshman Team

Stacy Lewis

- 2005 First-Team
- 2005 Freshman of the Year
- 2005 All-Freshman Team
- 2006 First-Team
- 2007 First-Team
- 2008 First-Team
- 2008 SEC Golfer of the Year
- 2008 Golf Scholar-Athlete of the Year
- 2008 H. Boyd McWhorter Scholar-Athlete

Gaby López

- 2013 Second-Team
- 2013 SEC All-Freshman Team

Amanda McCurdy

- 2004 Second-Team
- 2005 Second-Team
- 2006 First-Team

Lucy Nunn

- 2009 Second-Team

Regina Plasencia

- 2013 SEC All-Freshman Team

Kelli Shean

- 2008 All Freshman Team
- 2010 First-Team
- 2011 Second-Team

Emily Tubert

- 2011 First-Team
- 2011 SEC Co-Freshman of the Year
- 2011 SEC All-Freshman Team
- 2012 First-Team
- 2013 First-Team

== Coaching staff ==
Shauna Estes-Taylor became the head coach in 2007. Other Razorback head coaches include Sue Ertl (1994–96); Ulrika (Fisher) Belline (1996–2002); and Kelley Hester (2002–07).
