= List of female golfers =

A golfer is someone who plays golf. Below is a list of female golfers, professional and amateurs, sorted alphabetically. Category:Lists of golfers contains lists of golfers sorted in several other ways: by nationality, by tour and by type of major championship won (men's, women's or senior).

All members of the World Golf Hall of Fame are listed, including those inducted for their off-course contributions to the sport. World Golf Hall of Fame members are annotated HoF.

== A ==
(United States) Margaret Abbott	1878–1955
(Northern Ireland) Rhona Adair	1878–1961
(United States) Lynn Adams	1950–
(United States) Kathy Ahern	1949–1996
(South Korea) Shi-Hyun Ahn	1984–
(South Korea) Sun-Ju Ahn	1987–
(United States) Kristi Albers	1963–
(United States) Amy Alcott HoF	1956–
(Sweden) Helen Alfredsson	1965–
(United States) Danielle Ammaccapane	1965–
(Thailand) Pajaree Anannarukarn	1999–
(United States) Amy Anderson	1992–
(United States) Janet Anderson	1956–
(United States) Donna Andrews	1967–
(United States) Jody Anschutz	1962–
(France) Stéphanie Arricau	1973–
(India) Aditi Ashok	1998–
(United States) Maria Astrologes	1951–
(United States) Lori Atsedes	1964–
(United States) Debbie Austin	1948–

== B ==
(United States) Beth Bader	1973–
(South Korea) Baek Kyu-jung	1995–
(Colombia) Marisa Baena	1977–
(Australia) Mianne Bagger	1966–
(United States) Pam Barnett	1944–
(United States) Bea Barrett	1916–2002
(United States) Sharon Barrett	1961–
(United States) Tina Barrett	1966–
(United States) Barbara Barrow	1955–
(England) Pam Barton	1917–1943
(United States) Beth Bauer	1980–
(United States) Laura Baugh	1955–
(Israel) Laetitia Beck	1992–
(Scotland) Charlotte Beddows	1887–1976
(United States) June Beebe	1913–2003
(Canada) Isabelle Beisiegel	1979–
(United States) Judy Bell HoF	1936–2025
(United States) Peggy Kirk Bell HoF	1920–2016
(United States) Patty Berg HoF	1918–2006
(United States) Susie Berning	1941–
(United States) Missie Berteotti	1963–
(Argentina) Silvia Bertolaccini	1950–
(United States) Georgianna Bishop	1878–1971
(United States) Jane Blalock	1945–
(United States) Erica Blasberg	1984–2010
(Finland) Minea Blomqvist	1985–
(United States) Amanda Blumenherst	1986–
(Netherlands) Christel Boeljon	1987–
(Australia) Julia Boland	1985–
(Scotland) Carly Booth	1992–
(Canada) Jocelyne Bourassa	1947–2021
(United States) Nanci Bowen	1967–
(United States) Heather Bowie Young	1975–
(United States) Pat Bradley HoF	1951–
(United States) Murle Breer	1939–
(Wales) Becky Brewerton	1982–
(United States) Jerilyn Britz	1943–
(New Zealand) Lynnette Brooky	1968–
(United States) Lucy Barnes Brown	1859–1921
(United States) Mary Browne	1891–1971
(United States) Vivian Brownlee	c.1947–
(United States) Bonnie Bryant	1943–
(Canada) Barb Bunkowsky	1958–
(United States) Betty Burfeindt	1945–
(United States) Marge Burns	1925–2009
(United States) Brandie Burton	1972–
(France) Jeanne-Marie Busuttil	1976–

== C ==
(Scotland) (United States) Dorothy Campbell HoF	1883–1945
(Australia) Nikki Campbell	1980–
(United States) Donna Caponi HoF	1945–
(United States) JoAnne Carner HoF	1939–
(Spain) Raquel Carriedo-Tomás	1971–
(United States) Nicole Castrale	1979–
(Italy) Silvia Cavalleri	1972–
(France) Simone de la Chaume	1908–2001
(Taiwan) Mei-Chi Cheng	1959–
(South Korea) Chella Choi	1990–
(South Korea) Choi Na-Yeon	1987–
(South Korea) Chun In-gee	1994–
(South Korea) Il-Mi Chung	1972–
(Spain) Carlota Ciganda	1990–
(England) Holly Clyburn	1991–
(United States) Kay Cockerill	1964–
(Canada) Dawn Coe-Jones	1960–2016
(United States) Janet Coles	1954–
(United States) Glenna Collett-Vare HoF	1903–1989
(United States) Kathy Cornelius	1932–2026
(United States) Taylor Coutu	1987–
(Australia) Jane Crafter	1955–
(United States) Paula Creamer	1986–
(United States) Clifford Ann Creed	1938–
(Italy) Stefania Croce	1970–
(Uruguay) Fay Crocker	1914–
(United States) Mary Lou Crocker	1944–2016
(United States) Elaine Crosby	1958–
(United States) Carolyn Cudone	1918–2009
(United States) Betsy Cullen	1938–
(United States) Edith Cummings	1899–1984
(United States) Harriot Curtis	1881–1974
(United States) Margaret Curtis	1883–1965

== D ==
(United States) Heather Daly-Donofrio	1969–
(United States) Beth Daniel HoF	1956–
(United States) Bettye Danoff	1923–2011
(Wales) Karen Davies	1965–
(England) Laura Davies HoF	1963–
(United States) Beverley Davis	c.1957–
(United States) (Philippines) Dorothy Delasin	1980–
(United States) Grace DeMoss	1927–2024
(United States) Gail Denenberg	1947–
(Belgium) Florence Descampe	1969–
(United States) Helen Dettweiler	1919–1990
(United States) Laura Diaz	1975–
(Australia) Corinne Dibnah	1962–
(United States) Judy Dickinson	1950–
(England) Helen Dobson	1971–
(England) Lottie Dod	1871–1960
(United States) Betty Dodd	c.1930–1993
(England) Muriel Dodd	1892–1976
(Australia) Wendy Doolan	1968–
(United States) Dana Dormann	1967–
(England) Kitrina Douglas	1960–
(United States) Dakoda Dowd	1993–
(United States) Danielle Downey	1980–2014
(United States) Meredith Duncan	1980–
(United States) Page Dunlap	1965–
(United States) Moira Dunn	1971–
(United States) Alice Dye	1927–2019

== E ==
(United States) Dale Eggeling	1954–
(United States) Gloria Ehret	1941–
(Sweden) Cecilia Ekelundh	1978–
(United States) Kathleen Ekey	1986–
(Spain) Tania Elósegui	1981–
(United States) Shirley Englehorn	1940–
(United States) Austin Ernst	1992–
(Germany) Elisabeth Esterl	1976–
(United States) Michelle Estill	1962–
(England) Jodi Ewart Shadoff	1988–

== F ==
(England) Lora Fairclough	1970–
(Scotland) Meg Farquhar	1910–1988
(United States) Heather Farr	1965–1993
(United States) Mary Lena Faulk	1926–1995
(China) Shanshan Feng	1989–
(United States) Vicki Fergon	1955–
(United States) Jan Ferraris	1947–
(United States) Lisa Ferrero	1982–
(United States) Cindy Figg-Currier	1960–
(Spain) Marta Figueras-Dotti	1957–
(United States) Allison Finney	1958–
(Germany) Tina Fischer	1970–
(United States) Meaghan Francella	1982–
(Sweden) Louise Friberg	1980–
(United States) Amy Fruhwirth	1968–
(Japan) Yuri Fudoh	1976–
(Japan) Akiko Fukushima	1973–
(United States) Shirley Furlong	1959–

== G ==
(Germany) Sandra Gal	1985–
(United States) Mariel Galdiano	1998–
(United States) Jackie Gallagher-Smith	1967–
(United States) Lori Garbacz	1958–
(Australia) Nikki Garrett	1984–
(Republic of Ireland) Philomena Garvey	1926–2009
(United States) Marguerite Gaut	1888–1967
(United States) Jane Geddes	1960–
(United States) Dot Germain	1947–
(United States) Cathy Gerring	1961–
(United States) Althea Gibson	1927–2003
(England) Samantha Giles	1994–
(United States) Charlotte Glutting	1910–1996
(United States) Emily Glaser	1980–
(United States) Vicki Goetze	1972–
(United States) Kate Golden	1967–
(Sweden) Åsa Gottmo	1971–
(Canada) Gail Graham	1964–
(Paraguay) Julieta Granada	1986–
(United States) Tammie Green	1959–
(United States) Ann Gregory	1912–1990
(United States) Frances C. Griscom	1880–1973
(Sweden) Sofia Grönberg-Whitmore	1965–
(United States) Kathy Guadagnino	1961–
(United States) Natalie Gulbis	1983–
(Sweden) Sophie Gustafson	1973–

== H ==
(Morocco) Maha Haddioui	1988–
(United States) Marlene Hagge HoF	1934–2023
(Finland) Riikka Hakkarainen	1977–
(England) Georgia Hall	1996–
(England) Lisa Hall	1967–
(United States) Shelley Hamlin	1949–2018
(United States) Penny Hammel	1962–
(South Korea) Han Hee-Won	1978–
(United States) Beverly Hanson	1924–2014
(United States) Mina Harigae	1989–
(United States) Katherine Harley	1881–1961
(Japan) Michiko Hattori	1968–
(Germany) Bettina Hauert	1982–
(United States) Patty Hayes	1955–
(United States) Sandra Haynie HoF	1943–
(United States) Genevieve Hecker	1884–1960
(Sweden) Marlene Hedblom	1972–
(Sweden) Caroline Hedwall	1989–
(Canada) Brooke Henderson	1997–
(Australia) Rachel Hetherington	1972–
(Republic of Ireland) Florence Hezlet	c.1884–1945
(Northern Ireland) May Hezlet	1882–1969
(United States) Betty Hicks	1920–2011
(United States) Helen Hicks	1911–1974
(Japan) Riko Higashio	1975–
(United States) Pam Higgins	1945–
(Japan) Hisako "Chako" Higuchi HoF	1945–
(United States) Carolyn Hill	1959–
(United States) Cindy Hill	1948–
(United States) Opal Hill	1892–1981
(Australia) Whitney Hillier	1990–
(Japan) Mayumi Hirase	1969–
(United States) Kathy Hite	1948–2023
(Sweden) Maria Hjorth	1973–
(United States) Marion Hollins	1892–1944
(South Korea) Jin-Joo Hong	1983–
(United States) Robin Hood	1964–
(United States) Lauren Howe	1959–
(United States) Beatrix Hoyt	1880–1963
(England) Rebecca Hudson	1979–
(England) Charley Hull	1996–
(Taiwan) Amy Hung	1980–
(South Korea) M. J. Hur	1989–
(United States) Pat Hurst	1969–
(United States) Vicky Hurst	1990–

== I ==
(France) Karine Icher	1979–
(Scotland) Kathryn Imrie	1967–
(United States) Juli Inkster HoF	1960–
(United States) Connie Isler	1983–
(United States) Becky Iverson	1967–

== J ==
(United States) Betty Jameson HoF	1919–2009
(United States) Liz Janangelo	1983–
(South Korea) Jang Jeong	1980–
(United States) Ruth Jessen	1936–2007
(South Korea) Eun-Hee Ji	1986–
(United States) Tiffany Joh	1986–
(Sweden) Johanna Johansson	1977–
(United States) Christa Johnson	1958–
(United States) Jennifer Johnson	1991–
(England) Trish Johnson	1966–
(United States) Brittany Johnston	1986–
(United States) Cathy Johnston-Forbes	1963–
(United States) Rosie Jones	1959–
(United States) Patty Jordan	1959–
(United States) Joan Joyce	1940–
(Thailand) Ariya Jutanugarn	1995–
(Thailand) Moriya Jutanugarn	1994–

== K ==
(United States) Carole Jo Kabler	1938–
(Canada) Lorie Kane	1964–
(United States) Danielle Kang	1992–
(South Korea) Haeji Kang	1990–
(South Korea) Jimin Kang	1980–
(South Korea) Kang Soo-yun	1976–
(Japan) Minami Katsu	1998–
(United States) Laurel Kean	1963–
(Australia) Stacey Keating	1986–
(United States) Tracy Kerdyk	1966–
(United States) Cristie Kerr	1977–
(United States) Lisa Kiggens	1972–
(South Korea) Birdie Kim	1981–
(United States) Christina Kim	1984–
(South Korea) Kim Ha-Neul	1988–
(South Korea) Kim Hyo-joo	1995–
(South Korea) I.K. Kim	1988–
(South Korea) Kim Joo-Mi	1984–
(United States) Kimberly Kim	1991–
(South Korea) Mi-Hyun Kim	1977–
(South Korea) Kim Ran-kyung	1992–
(South Korea) Kim Sei-young	1993–
(South Korea) Song-Hee Kim	1988–
(South Korea) Young Kim	1980–
(United States) Judy Kimball	1938–
(United States) Betsy King HoF	1955–
(United States) Dorothy Kirby	1920–2000
(Australia) Katherine Kirk	1982–
(Japan) Rui Kitada	1981–
(United States) Beverly Klass	1956–
(United States) Emilee Klein	1974–
(South Korea) Ko Jin-young	1995–
(New Zealand) Lydia Ko	1997–
(South Korea) Woo-Soon Ko	1964–
(Japan) Hiromi Kobayashi	1963–
(Sweden) Carin Koch	1971–
(United States) Jessica Korda	1993–
(United States) Nelly Korda	1998–
(Russia) Maria Kostina	1983–
(France) Ludivine Kreutz	1973–
(South Korea) Ok-Hee Ku	1956–2013
(United States) Kelli Kuehne	1977–
(Taiwan) (United States) Candie Kung	1981–

== L ==
(France) Catherine Lacoste	1945–
(United States) Cindy LaCrosse	1987–
(France) Virginie Lagoutte-Clément	1979–
(United States) Brittany Lang	1985–
(United States) Bonnie Lauer	1951–
(United States) Estelle Lawson	1907–1983
(United States) Alison Lee	1995–
(South Korea) Ilhee Lee	1988–
(South Korea) Jee Young Lee	1986–
(South Korea) Meena Lee	1981–
(South Korea) Mi Hyang Lee	1993–
(Australia) Minjee Lee	c.1996–
(South Korea) Mirim Lee	1990–
(South Korea) Sarah Lee	1979–
(South Korea) Seon-Hwa Lee	1986–
(England) Jenny Lee Smith	1948–
(England) Cecil Leitch	1891–1977
(United States) Isabelle Lendl	1991–
(Sweden) Camilla Lennarth	1988–
(United States) Amelia Lewis	1991–
(United States) Stacy Lewis	1985–
(United States) Lucy Li	2002–
(United States) Jenny Lidback	1963–
(United States) Brittany Lincicome	1985–
(Sweden) Pernilla Lindberg	1986–
(United States) Leta Lindley	1972–
(South Africa) (United States) Sally Little	1951–
(Mexico) Alejandra Llaneza	1988–
(Mexico) Gaby López	1993–
(United States) Nancy Lopez HoF	1957–
(France) Marie-Laure de Lorenzi	1961–
(Taiwan) Teresa Lu	1987–
(Italy) Diana Luna	1982–
(United States) Hilary Lunke	1979–
(Australia) Karen Lunn	1966–
(Australia) Mardi Lunn	1968–

== M ==
(United States) Cindy Mackey	1961–
(United States) Paige Mackenzie	1983–
(Northern Ireland) Maureen Madill	1958–
(Uganda) Eva Magala	1974–
(Republic of Ireland) Leona Maguire	1994–
(Republic of Ireland) Lisa Maguire	1991–
(United States) Meg Mallon HoF	1963–
(United States) Caroline Fraser Manice	1871–1929
(United States) Carol Mann HoF	1941–2018
(Spain) Paula Martí	1980–
(United States) Mo Martin	1982–
(United States) Debbie Massey	1950–
(Germany) Caroline Masson	1989–
(England) Danielle Masters	1983–
(Australia) Margie Masters	1934–
(England) Kiran Matharu	1989–
(Scotland) Catriona Matthew	1969–
(United States) Susie McAllister	1947–
(United States) Marian McDougall	1913–2009
(United States) Michelle McGann	1969–
(United States) Missie McGeorge	1959–
(United States) Jill McGill	1972–
(New Zealand) Marnie McGuire	1969–
(United States) Barbara McIntire	1935–2025
(Scotland) Mhairi McKay	1975–
(United States) Melissa McNamara	1966–
(United States) Kristy McPherson	1981–
(Thailand) Wichanee Meechai	1993–
(India) Smriti Mehra	1972–
(United States) Lauri Merten	1960–
(France) Patricia Meunier-Lebouc	1972–
(United States) Pat Meyers	1954–
(United States) Sydnee Michaels	1988–
(United States) Lucia Mida	1890–1960
(United States) Alice Miller	1956–
(United States) Cindy Miller	1956–
(United States) Sharon Miller	1941–
(Australia) Joanne Mills	1969–
(United States) Mary Mills	1940–
(Scotland) Moira Milton	1923–2012
(South Korea) Na-On Min	1988–
(Japan) Ai Miyazato	1985–
(Japan) Mika Miyazato	1989–
(United States) Kris Monaghan	1960–
(Germany) Anja Monke	1977–
(Scotland) Janice Moodie	1973–
(United States) Haley Moore	1998–
(Wales) Becky Morgan	1974–
(Japan) Yuko Moriguchi	1955–
(Japan) Rikako Morita	1990–
(England) Joanne Morley	1966–
(United States) Cathy Morse	1955–
(United States) Barb Mucha	1961–
(Spain) Azahara Muñoz	1987–
(United States) Lenore Muraoka	1955–
(United States) Terry-Jo Myers	1962–

== N ==
(Uganda) Flavia Namakula	1985–
(Zambia) Melissa Nawa	1991–
(United States) Martha Nause	1954–
(Sweden) Liselotte Neumann	1966–
(England) Alison Nicholas	1962–
(India) Sharmila Nicollet	1991–
(Sweden) Catrin Nilsmark	1967–
(Sweden) Pia Nilsson	1954–
(Thailand) Virada Nirapathpongporn	1982–
(France) Gwladys Nocera	1975–
(Sweden) Anna Nordqvist	1987–
(Uganda) Monica Azuba Ntege	1956–

== O ==
(Mexico) Lorena Ochoa HoF	1981–
(South Korea) Ji-Young Oh	1988–
(Australia) Su-Hyun Oh	1996–
(Japan) Tatsuko Ohsako	1952–
(Japan) Michiko Okada	1945–
(Japan) Ayako Okamoto HoF	1951–
(United States) Maureen Orcutt	1907–2007
(United States) Hannah O'Sullivan	1998–
(United States) Pat O'Sullivan	1926–2019
(United States) Ryann O'Toole	1987–

== P ==
(South Africa) Lee-Anne Pace	1981–
(South Korea) Se Ri Pak HoF	1977–
(France) Anne Marie Palli	1955–
(United States) Sandra Palmer	1943–
(United States) Brooke Pancake	1990–
(Scotland) Catherine Panton-Lewis	1955–
(Brazil) (United States) Angela Park	1988–
(United States) Annie Park	1995–
(South Korea) Grace Park	1979–
(South Korea) Hee-Jung "Gloria" Park	1980–
(South Korea) Hee Young Park	1987–
(South Korea) Inbee Park	1988–
(United States) Jane Park	1986–
(Sweden) Mikaela Parmlid	1980–
(United States) Dottie Pepper	1965–
(United States) Becky Pearson	1956–
(Chile) Nicole Perrot	1983–
(Norway) Suzann Pettersen	1981–
(Thailand) Pornanong Phatlum	1989–
(England) Caroline Pierce	1963–
(United States) Julie Piers	1962–
(Wales) Eleanor Pilgrim	1977–
(United States) Gerina Piller	1985–
(United States) Dorothy Germain Porter	1924–2012
(United States) Joan Pitcock	1967–
(United States) Mary Bea Porter	1949–
(Canada) Sandra Post	1948–
(United States) Kathy Postlewait	1949–
(United States) Renee Powell	1946–
(United States) Stacy Prammanasudh	1979–
(United States) Ashley Prange	1981–
(United States) Daria Pratt	1859–1938
(United States) Jo Ann Prentice	1933–2025
(United States) Morgan Pressel	1988–
(United States) Phyllis Preuss	1939–2024
(Spain) Marta Prieto	1978–
(Australia) Penny Pulz	1953–
(United States) Jackie Pung	1921–2017

== Q ==
(United States) Anne Quast	1947–
(United States) Sally Quinlan	1961–

== R ==
(United States) Bonnie Randolph	c.1928–
(United States) Judy Rankin HoF	1945–
(United States) Reilley Rankin	1979–
(United States) Cindy Rarick	1959–
(England) Gladys Ravenscroft	1888–1960
(United States) Betsy Rawls HoF	1928–2023
(Australia) Anna Rawson	1981–
(Spain) Beatriz Recari	1987–
(United States) Michele Redman	1965–
(Scotland) Dale Reid	1959–2023
(England) Melissa Reid	1987–
(Mexico) Violeta Retamoza	1983–
(South Africa) Paula Reto	1990–
(United States) Cathy Reynolds	1957–
(United States) Deb Richard	1963–
(United States) Polly Riley	1926–2002
(United States) Laurie Rinker	1962–
(United States) Alice Ritzman	1952–
(United States) Patti Rizzo	1960–
(United States) Sue Roberts	1948–
(United States) Kelly Robbins	1969–
(Scotland) Belle Robertson	1936–
(United States) Barbara Romack	1932–2016
(Philippines) Jennifer Rosales	1978–
(South Korea) So Yeon Ryu	1990–

== S ==
(United States) Kim Saiki	1966–
(United States) Lizette Salas	1989–
(Spain) Ana Sánchez	1976–
(Italy) Sophie Sandolo	1976–
(Netherlands) Dewi Claire Schreefel	1985–
(United States) Cindy Schreyer	1963–
(England) Lady Margaret Scott	1874–1938
(United States) Nancy Scranton	1961–
(France) Lally Segard	1921–2018
(United States) Carol Semple HoF	1948–
(South Korea) Hee Kyung Seo	1986–
(Italy) Giulia Sergas	1979–
(Canada) Alena Sharp	1981–
(United States) Patty Sheehan HoF	1956–
(Canada) Jessica Shepley	1983–
(Canada) Cathy Sherk	1950–
(South Korea) Jiyai Shin	1988–
(United States) Dinah Shore HoF	1916–1994
(South Africa) Ashleigh Simon	1989–
(South Korea) (United States) Pearl Sinn	1967–
(Sweden) Karin Sjödin	1983–
(Norway) Marianne Skarpnord	1986–
(United States) Val Skinner	1960–
(Australia) Kristie Smith	1988–
(United States) Marilynn Smith HoF	1929–2019
(United States) Wiffi Smith	1936–
(United States) Beth Solomon	1952–
(South Korea) (Thailand) Aree Song	1986–
(South Korea) Bo-Bae Song	1986–
(United States) Christine Song	1991–
(United States) (South Korea) Jennifer Song	1989–
(South Korea) (Thailand) Naree Song	1986–
(Sweden) (United States) Annika Sörenstam HoF	1970–
(Sweden) Charlotta Sörenstam	1973–
(United States) Leslie Spalding	1969–
(United States) Stephanie Sparks	1973–
(United States) Muffin Spencer-Devlin	1953–
(Czech Republic) Klára Spilková	1994–
(United States) Shirley Spork	1927–2022
(United States) Sandra Spuzich	1937–
(United States) Hollis Stacy HoF	1954–
(Sweden) Louise Stahle	1985–
(United States) Angela Stanford	1977–
(United States) Debbie Steinbach	1953–
(United States) Sherri Steinhauer	1962–
(Australia) Jan Stephenson HoF	1951–
(United States) (Canada) Alexa Stirling	1897–1977
(United States) Denise Strebig	1960–
(Canada) Marlene Streit HoF	1934–
(England) Suzanne Strudwick	1965–
(United States) Eileen Stulb	1923–2007
(England) Karen Stupples	1973–
(United States) Louise Suggs HoF	1923–2015
(Thailand) Thidapa Suwannapura	1992–

== T ==
(United States) Kris Tamulis	1980–
(England) Lauren Taylor	1994–
(Thailand) Atthaya Thitikul	2003–
(United States) Lexi Thompson	1995–
(Denmark) Iben Tinning	1974–
(Canada) Margaret Todd	1918–2019
(Canada) Tina Tombs	1962–
(Paraguay) Celeste Troche	1981–
(United States) Kris Tschetter	1964–
(Taiwan) Yani Tseng	1989–
(Taiwan) Ai-Yu Tu	1954–
(United States) Sherri Turner	1956–

== U ==
(Japan) Momoko Ueda	1986–
(Colombia) Mariajo Uribe	1990–

== V ==
(Scotland) Jessie Valentine	1915–2006
(Belgium) Valérie Van Ryckeghem	1975–
(United States) Virginia Van Wie	1908–1997
(France) Brigitte Varangot	1940–
(Russia) Maria Verchenova	1986–

== W ==
(Wales) Helen Wadsworth	1964–
(Sweden) Lotta Wahlin	1983–
(United States) Colleen Walker	1956–2012
(Scotland) Kylie Walker	1986–
(England) Mickey Walker	1952–
(Canada) Lisa Walters	1960–
(United States) Wendy Ward	1973–
(United States) Jo Ann Washam	1950–2019
(Australia) Karrie Webb HoF	1974–
(United States) Olga Strashun Weil	1903–1963
(United States) Jane Weiller	1912–1989
(Sweden) Linda Wessberg	1980–
(England) Joyce Wethered HoF	1901–1997
(United States) Suzy Whaley	1966–
(United States) Donna White	1954–
(United States) Barb Whitehead	1961–
(United States) Pauline Whittier	1876–1946
(United States) Kathy Whitworth HoF	1939–
(United States) Michelle Wie	1989–
(United States) Maggie Will	1964–
(England) Enid Wilson	1910–1996
(United States) Peggy Wilson	1934–
(United States) Joanne Winter	1924–1996
(United States) Cheyenne Woods	1990–
(Australia) Lindsey Wright	1979–
(United States) Mickey Wright HoF	1935–2020
(Scotland) Pamela Wright	1964–
(Canada) Jennifer Wyatt	1965–

== X ==
None

== Y ==
(South Korea) Amy Yang	1989–
(South Korea) Yi Eun-jung	1988–
(South Korea) Yim Sung-Ah	1984–
(Japan) Sakura Yokomine	1985–
(South Korea) Sun-Young Yoo	1986–
(Japan) Nayoko Yoshikawa	1949–

== Z ==
(Sweden) Emma Zackrisson	1979–
(United States) Babe Zaharias HoF	1911–1956
(United States) Mary Beth Zimmerman	1960–
(United States) Joyce Ziske	1935–
(Italy) Veronica Zorzi	1980–
(England) Henni Zuël	1990–

== See also ==
- List of sportspeople
- List of sportswomen
- List of LPGA major championship winning golfers
