= Junior PGA Championship =

Amateur golf tournament in the United States

Tournament information
- Location: Bethesda, Maryland, U.S.
- Established: 1976
- Course: Congressional Country Club
- Par: 72
- Organized by: PGA of America
- Format: 72-hole Stroke play
- Month played: August

Current champion
- Baylor Larrabee; Avery McCrery

The Junior PGA Championship is a leading annual junior golf tournament in the United States for amateur golfers under the age of 18.

== Format ==
The tournament has been played since 1976 and is the flagship junior tournament of the PGA of America. The field consists of 156 girls and 156 boys. Half qualify through their PGA Section and the remainder of the field is based on national junior/amateur events and special exemptions.

== History ==
Several tournament winners have later gone on to success on the PGA Tour, such as Trevor Immelman, David Toms and Sam Burns. Jordan Spieth and Tiger Woods have finished runner-up.

LPGA Tour major winners Jenny Lidback, Grace Park, Inbee Park and Cristie Kerr have all won the event. Heather Farr, Lexi Thompson, Ariya Jutanugarn, Beth Bauer and Aree Song have won twice, and Vicki Goetze is the only player to have won three times.

In 2019, Jack Heath shot a final-round 62 to beat Chris Couch's previous lowest final-round score of 63, set in 1990.

== Winners ==
Year	Boys			Girls		Venue	Location
Year	Winner	Runner(s)-up		Winner	Runner(s)-up	Venue	Location
2026	Jaden Soong	Chase Hughes; Aadi Palmer		Aubrey Hilgers	Yuije Liu	Fields Ranch at PGA Frisco	Texas
2025	Lunden Esterline	Giuseppe Puebla		Asterisk Talley	Zoe Cusack	Birck Boilermaker Golf Complex	Indiana
2024	Baylor Larrabee	Jake Albert; Lev Grinberg; Asher Vargas		Avery McCrery	Elizabeth Rudisill; Alice Ziyi Zhao	Congressional Country Club	Maryland
2023	Miles Russell	Jackson Byrd; Billy Davis		Gianna Clemente	Kylee Choi; Yana Wilson	Hot Springs Country Club	Arkansas
2022	Max Herendeen	Ethan Gao		Kaitlyn Schroeder	Rianne Malixi	Cog Hill Golf & Country Club	Illionois
2021	Caleb Surratt	Nick Dunlap; Ben James; Bryan Lee; Eric Lee		Anna Davis	Julia Misemer	Valhalla Golf Club	Kentucky
2019	Jack Heath	Canon Claycomb		Yuka Saso	Jensen Castle	Keney Park Golf Course	Connecticut
2018	Akshay Bhatia	Tommy Stephenson		Yealimi Noh	Rose Zhang	Kearney Hill Golf Links	Kentucky
2017	Akshay Bhatia	Reid Davenport		Rose Zhang	Yealimi Noh	Country Club of St. Albans	Missouri
2016	Norman Xiong	Patrick Welch		Lucy Li	Mariel Galdiano	Wannamoisett Country Club	Rhode Island
2015	Brad Dalke	Wilson Furr		Elizabeth Wang	Mariel Galdiano	Miramont Country Club	Texas
2014	Sam Burns	Gordon Neale		Kristen Gillman	Bethany Wu	Miramont Country Club	Texas
2013	Tyler McDaniel	Sam Burns		Amy Lee	Abbey Carlson	Trump National Golf Club	D.C.
2012	Robby Shelton	Cameron Champ		Ariya Jutanugarn (2)	Samantha Wagner	Sycamore Hills Golf Club	Indiana
2011	Cody Proveaux	Lorens Chan		Ariya Jutanugarn	Mariah Stackhouse	Sycamore Hills Golf Club	Indiana
2010	Denny McCarthy	Anthony Paolucci		Cassy Isagawa	Ginger Howard	Sycamore Hills Golf Club	Indiana
2009	T.J. Vogel	Jordan Spieth		Lexi Thompson (2)	Sarah Brown	TPC River's Bend	Ohio
2008	Anthony Paolucci	Jordan Spieth		Danielle Frasier	Sarah Brown	TPC River's Bend	Ohio
2007	Chris De Forest	Mark Johnson		Lexi Thompson	Kimberly Kim	Westfield Group CC	Ohio
2006	Joe Monte	Tony Mapu Finau		Brittany Altomare	Kristen Schelling	Westfield Group CC	Ohio
2005	Alex Volpenheim	Joe Monte		Stephanie Kono	Kristina Wong	Westfield Group CC	Ohio
2004	Daniel Woltman	Brian Maurer		Angela Park	Jennie Lee	Westfield Group CC	Ohio
2003	Phillip Bryan	James Sacheck		Emma Cabrera-Bello	Jennie Lee	Westfield Group CC	Ohio
2002	Tyler Aldridge	Adam Porzak		Inbee Park (2)	Jenny Suh	Westfield Group CC	Ohio
2001	Taylor Hall	Casey Wittenberg		Inbee Park	Mallory Code	Westfield Group CC	Ohio
2000	Ty Tryon	Chan Song; James Vargas		Aree Song (2)	Naree Song (2)	PGA National GC	Florida
1999	Chan Song	Jayme Berkowitz		Aree Song	Naree Song	PGA National GC	Florida
1998	Sean O'Hair	Nathan Fritz		Leigh Anne Hardin	Dorothy Joy Delasin	PGA National GC	Florida
1997	Bubba Dickerson	Nicholas Loar		Beth Bauer (2)	Stacy Prammanasudh	PGA National GC	Florida
1996	Trevor Immelman	Kyle Thompson		Grace Park	Beth Bauer	PGA National GC	Florida
1995	Kyle Thompson	Andy Doeden		Cristie Kerr	Jae Jean Ro	PGA National GC	Florida
1994	Joel Kribel	Boyd Summerhays		Beth Bauer	Jenny Lee	PGA National GC	Florida
1993	Pat Perez	Robert Floyd		Erika Hayashida	Betty Chen	Pinehurst Resort	North Carolina
1992	D. A. Points	Todd Lynch		Kellee Booth	Eunice Choi	PGA National GC	Florida
1991	David Dawley	Chip Spiron		Julie Brand	Jeong Min Park	PGA National GC	Florida
1990	Chris Couch	Tiger Woods		Vicki Goetze (3)	Estafania Knuth	PGA National GC	Florida
1989	Bobby Collins	Briny Baird, Justin Leonard		Vicki Goetze (2)	Renee Heiken	PGA National GC	Florida
1988	Reynold Lee	Kevin Hammer		Brandie Burton	Kimberly Cayce	Bellerive CC	Missouri
1987	Jeff Manson	Thomas Hurley		Vicki Goetze	Michelle McGann	PGA National GC	Florida
1986	Brian Montgomery	Damien Jamila		Adele Moore	Tracy Nakamura	PGA National GC	Florida
1985	Steve Termeer	John Alber		Jean Zeditz	Dana Lofland	PGA National GC	Florida
1984	David Toms	Michael Finne		Clare Dolan	Cheryl Morlye	PGA National GC	Florida
1983	Michael Bradley	Edward Pfister		Tracy Kerdyk	Cheryl Morlye	PGA National GC	Florida
1982	Billy Mayfair	Tim Fleming		Heather Farr (2)	Dottie Pepper	PGA National GC	Florida
1981	Billy Andrade	Scott Erikson		Cathy Johnston	Heather Farr	PGA National GC	Florida
1980	Tracy Phillips	John Inman		Heather Farr	Jenny Lidback	PGA National GC	Florida
1979	Rick Fehr	Tracy Phillips		Penny Hammel	Jenny Lidback	Callaway Gardens	Georgia
1978	Willie Wood	Bob Wolcott		Kathy Baker	Sharon Barrett	Callaway Gardens	Georgia
1977	Randy Watkins	Rick Stallings		Debbie Hall	Lauri Merten	Walt Disney World	Florida
1976	Larry Field	Ricky Smallridge	Nancy Rubin	Michelle Jordan		Walt Disney World	Florida
