= 2004 LPGA Tour =

Golf tour season

2004 LPGA Tour season
- Duration: March 11, 2004 – December 19, 2004
- Number of official events: 33
- Most wins: 8 (Sweden) Annika Sörenstam
- Money leader: (Sweden) Annika Sörenstam
- Rolex Player of the Year: (Sweden) Annika Sörenstam
- Vare Trophy: (South Korea) Grace Park
- Rookie of the Year: (South Korea) Ahn Shi-hyun

The 2004 LPGA Tour was a series of weekly golf tournaments for elite female golfers from around the world which took place from March through December 2004. The tournaments were sanctioned by the United States–based Ladies Professional Golf Association (LPGA). This was the 55th season since the LPGA Tour officially began in 1950. The season consisted of 32 official money events. Total prize money for all tournaments was $42,875,000.

Annika Sörenstam continued to dominate women's golf in 2004, winning eight tournaments and $2,544,707 in prize money. Four other players earned over $1 million. There were six first-time winners in 2004: Moira Dunn, Christina Kim, Lorena Ochoa, Jennifer Rosales, Kim Saiki, and Karen Stupples. Ochoa (Mexico) and Rosales (Philippines) were the first winners of their respective countries to win on the LPGA Tour.

For details of what happened in the main tournaments of the year see 2004 in golf.

== Tournament schedule and results ==
The number in parentheses after winners' names show the player's total number of official money, individual event wins on the LPGA Tour including that event.

Date	Tournament	Location	Winner	Purse ($)	Winner's share ($)
Mar 14	Welch's/Fry's Championship	Arizona	(England) Karen Stupples (1)	800,000	120,000
Mar 21	Safeway International	Arizona	(Sweden) Annika Sörenstam (49)	1,200,000	180,000
Mar 28	**Kraft Nabisco Championship**	California	(South Korea) Grace Park (5)	1,600,000	240,000
Apr 4	The Office Depot Championship	California	(Sweden) Annika Sörenstam (50)	1,750,000	262,500
Apr 17	LPGA Takefuji Classic	Nevada	(United States) Cristie Kerr (2)	1,100,000	165,000
May 2	Chick-fil-A Charity Championship	Georgia	(Philippines) Jennifer Rosales (1)	1,600,000	240,000
May 9	Michelob ULTRA Open at Kingsmill	Virginia	(South Korea) Se Ri Pak (22)	2,200,000	330,000
May 16	Franklin American Mortgage Championship	Tennessee	(Mexico) Lorena Ochoa (1)	900,000	135,000
May 23	Sybase Classic	New York	(United States) Sherri Steinhauer (6)	1,250,000	187,500
May 30	LPGA Corning Classic	New York	(Sweden) Annika Sörenstam (51)	1,000,000	150,000
Jun 6	Kellogg-Keebler Classic	Illinois	(Australia) Karrie Webb (30)	1,200,000	180,000
Jun 13	**McDonald's LPGA Championship**	Delaware	(Sweden) Annika Sörenstam (52)	1,600,000	240,000
Jun 20	ShopRite LPGA Classic	New Jersey	(United States) Cristie Kerr (3)	1,300,000	195,000
Jun 27	Wegmans LPGA	New York	(United States) Kim Saiki (1)	1,500,000	225,000
Jul 4	**U.S. Women's Open**	Massachusetts	(United States) Meg Mallon (16)	3,100,000	560,000
Jul 11	BMO Financial Group Canadian Women's Open	Ontario	(United States) Meg Mallon (17)	1,300,000	195,000
Jul 18	Giant Eagle LPGA Classic	Ohio	(United States) Moira Dunn (1)	1,000,000	150,000
Jul 24	Evian Masters	France	(Australia) Wendy Doolan (3)	2,500,000	375,000
Aug 1	**Weetabix Women's British Open**	England	(England) Karen Stupples (2)	1,600,000	290,880
Aug 8	Jamie Farr Owens Corning Classic	Ohio	(United States) Meg Mallon (18)	1,100,000	165,000
Aug 22	Wendy's Championship for Children	Ohio	(Scotland) Catriona Matthew (2)	1,100,000	165,000
Aug 29	Wachovia LPGA Classic	Pennsylvania	(Mexico) Lorena Ochoa (2)	1,000,000	150,000
Sep 5	State Farm Classic	Illinois	(United States) Cristie Kerr (4)	1,200,000	180,000
Sep 12	John Q. Hammons Hotel Classic	Oklahoma	(Sweden) Annika Sörenstam (53)	1,000,000	150,000
Sep 19	Safeway Classic	Oregon	(South Korea) Hee-Won Han (3)	1,200,000	180,000
Sep 26	Longs Drugs Challenge	California	(United States) Christina Kim (1)	1,000,000	150,000
Oct 10	Asahi Ryokuken International Championship	South Carolina	(Sweden) Liselotte Neumann (13)	1,000,000	150,000
Oct 17	Samsung World Championship	California	(Sweden) Annika Sörenstam (54)	825,000	206,250
Oct 31	CJ Nine Bridges Classic	South Korea	(South Korea) Grace Park (6)	1,350,000	202,500
Nov 7	Mizuno Classic	Japan	(Sweden) Annika Sörenstam (55)	1,000,000	150,000
Nov 14	The Mitchell Company Tournament of Champions	Alabama	(United States) Heather Daly-Donofrio (2)	800,000	130,000
Nov 21	ADT Championship	Florida	(Sweden) Annika Sörenstam (56)	1,000,000	215,000
Dec 19	Wendy's 3-Tour Challenge	Nevada	LPGA Tour	n/a	

Tournaments in bold are majors.

== Leaders ==
Money List leaders

Rank	Player	Country	Earnings ($)	Events
1	Annika Sörenstam	Sweden	2,544,707	18
2	Grace Park	South Korea	1,525,471	25
3	Lorena Ochoa	Mexico	1,450,824	27
4	Meg Mallon	United States	1,358,623	21
5	Cristie Kerr	United States	1,189,990	24
6	Karen Stupples	England	968,852	23
7	Mi Hyun Kim	South Korea	931,693	28
8	Hee-Won Han	South Korea	840,605	28
9	Karrie Webb	Australia	748,316	22
10	Jennifer Rosales	Philippines	693,625	25

Scoring Average leaders

Rank	Player	Country	Average
1	Annika Sörenstam	Sweden	68.70
2	Grace Park	South Korea	69.99
3	Lorena Ochoa	Mexico	70.02
4	Cristie Kerr	United States	70.33
5	Mi Hyun Kim	South Korea	70.48

== Award winners ==
The three competitive awards given out by the LPGA each year are:

- The Rolex Player of the Year is awarded based on a formula in which points are awarded for top-10 finishes and are doubled at the LPGA's four major championships. The points system is: 30 points for first; 12 points for second; nine points for third; seven points for fourth; six points for fifth; five points for sixth; four points for seventh; three points for eighth; two points for ninth and one point for 10th.
  - 2004 Winner: Annika Sörenstam. Runner-up: Grace Park
- The Vare Trophy, named for Glenna Collett-Vare, is given to the player with the lowest scoring average for the season.
  - 2004 Winner: Grace Park. Runner-up: Annika Sörenstam
- The Louis Suggs Rolex Rooke of the Year Award is awarded to the first-year player on the LPGA Tour who scores the highest in a points competition in which points are awarded at all full-field domestic events and doubled at the LPGA's four major championships. The points system is: 150 points for first; 80 points for second; 75 points for third; 70 points for fourth; and 65 points for fifth. After fifth place, points are awarded in increments of three, beginning at sixth place with 62 points. Rookies who make the cut in an event and finish below 41st each receive five points. The award is named after Louise Suggs, one of the founders of the LPGA.
  - 2004 Winner: Shi Hyun Ahn. Runner-up: Aree Song

== See also ==
- 2004 in golf
