= 2004 U.S. Women's Open =

Coordinates: 42.266°N 72.568°W

Tournament information
- Dates: July 1–4, 2004
- Location: South Hadley, Massachusetts
- Course: Orchards Golf Club
- Organized by: USGA
- Tour: LPGA Tour

Statistics
- Par: 71
- Length: 6,473 yards (5,919 m)
- Field: 156 players, 66 after cut
- Cut: 147 (+5)
- Prize fund: $3.1 million
- Winner's share: $560,000

Champion
- (United States) Meg Mallon
- 274 (−10)

Location in the United States
Location in Massachusetts

The 2004 U.S. Women's Open was the 59th U.S. Women's Open, held July 1–4 at the Orchards Golf Club in South Hadley, Massachusetts, a suburb north of Springfield. The event was televised by ESPN and NBC Sports.

Meg Mallon won her second U.S. Women's Open title, two strokes ahead of runner-up Annika Sörenstam. The 54-hole leader was Jennifer Rosales at 206 (−7), with Mallon, Sörenstam, and Kelly Robbins three strokes back at 209 (−4).

In the final round, Mallon shot 65 (−6) to Sorenstam's 67 (−4), and Rosales fell down to fourth with a 75 (+4). It was Mallon's fourth and final major title; her first was thirteen years earlier in 1991, also at the U.S. Open.

== Course layout ==
The Orchards Golf Club

Hole	1	2	3	4	5	6	7	8	9	Out	10	11	12	13	14	15	16	17	18	In	Total
Yards	408	359	502	421	158	384	185	388	527	3,322	163	370	344	456	402	377	439	178	412	3,141	6,473
Par	4	4	5	4	3	4	3	4	5	36	3	4	4	5	4	4	4	3	4	35	71

== Round summaries ==
=== First round ===
Thursday, July 1, 2004
Friday, July 2, 2004

Place	Player	Score	To par
1	(United States) Brittany Lincicome (a)	66	−5
2	(France) Patricia Meunier-Lebouc	67	−4
3	(United States) Beth Daniel	69	−2
T4	(Australia) Michelle Ellis	70	−1
T4	(Australia) Katherine Hull	70	−1
T4	(United States) Pat Hurst	70	−1
T4	(Taiwan) Candie Kung	70	−1
T4	(South Korea) Se Ri Pak	70	−1
T4	(United States) Michele Redman	70	−1
T4	(Philippines) Jennifer Rosales	70	−1
T4	(United States) Kim Saiki	70	−1

=== Second round ===
Friday, July 2, 2004

Place	Player	Score	To par
1	(Philippines) Jennifer Rosales	70-67=137	−5
T2	(Taiwan) Candie Kung	70-68=138	−4
T2	(United States) Kim Saiki	70-68=138	−4
T4	(Australia) Michelle Ellis	70-69=139	−3
T4	(Sweden) Carin Koch	72-67=139	−3
T4	(Sweden) Annika Sörenstam	71-68=139	−3
T7	(United States) Moira Dunn	73-67=140	−2
T7	(Australia) Rachel Teske	71-69=140	−2
T9	(United States) Paula Creamer (a)	72-69=141	−1
T9	(United States) Pat Hurst	70-71=141	−1
T9	(United States) Kelly Robbins	74-67=141	−1
T9	(United States) Michelle Wie (a)	71-70=141	−1

=== Third round ===
Saturday, July 3, 2004

Place	Player	Score	To par
1	(Philippines) Jennifer Rosales	70-67-69=206	−7
T2	(United States) Meg Mallon	73-69-67=209	−4
T2	(United States) Kelly Robbins	74-67-68=209	−4
T2	(Sweden) Annika Sörenstam	71-68-70=209	−4
5	(Australia) Rachel Teske	71-69-70=210	−3
6	(Australia) Michelle Ellis	70-69-72=211	−2
T7	(United States) Moira Dunn	73-67-72=212	−1
T7	(United States) Pat Hurst	70-71-71=212	−1
T7	(Taiwan) Candie Kung	70-68-74=212	−1
T7	(United States) Kim Saiki	70-68-74=212	−1
T7	(United States) Michelle Wie (a)	71-70-71=212	−1

=== Final round ===
Sunday, July 4, 2004

Place	Player	Score	To par	Money ($)
1	(United States) Meg Mallon	73-69-67-65=274	−10	560,000
2	(Sweden) Annika Sörenstam	71-68-70-67=276	−8	335,000
3	(United States) Kelly Robbins	74-67-68-69=278	−6	208,863
4	(Philippines) Jennifer Rosales	70-67-69-75=281	−3	145,547
T5	(Taiwan) Candie Kung	70-68-74-70=282	−2	111,173
T5	(United States) Michele Redman	70-72-73-67=282	−2	111,173
T7	(South Korea) Jeong Jang	72-74-71-66=283	−1	86,744
T7	(United States) Moira Dunn	73-67-72-71=283	−1	86,744
T7	(United States) Pat Hurst	70-71-71-71=283	−1	86,744
T10	(Sweden) Carin Koch	72-67-75-70=284	E	68,813
T10	(Australia) Michelle Ellis	70-69-72-73=284	E	68,813
T10	(Australia) Rachel Teske	71-69-70-74=284	E	68,813

==== Scorecard ====
Hole	1	2	3	4	5	6	7	8	9	10	11	12	13	14	15	16	17	18
Par	4	4	3	4	4	4	3	5	4	4	4	3	5	4	5	4	3	5
(United States) Mallon	−4	−4	−5	−6	−6	−6	−6	−6	−7	−7	−8	−9	−9	−10	−10	−10	−10	−10
(Sweden) Sörenstam	−3	−3	−3	−3	−3	−3	−4	−4	−4	−5	−5	−5	−6	−6	−6	−6	−7	−8
(United States) Robbins	−4	−3	−3	−3	−3	−3	−4	−4	−6	−6	−6	−7	−7	−7	−6	−6	−6	−6
(Philippines) Rosales	−8	−8	−8	−8	−8	−8	−7	−6	−6	−5	−5	−5	−5	−5	−4	−3	−3	−3

Cumulative tournament scores, relative to par

Eagle	Birdie	Bogey
