= Laura Brown (golfer) =

American professional golfer

Head coach of the Daytona Beach College women's golf team
- Incumbent
- Assumed office 1998

Personal details
- Born: 1970 (age 55–56) New Smyrna Beach, Florida, U.S.
- Education: University of Florida
- Profession: Golfer

Laura Alicia Brown (born 1970) is a former American college and professional golfer.

Brown was born in New Smyrna Beach, Florida. She attended New Smyrna Beach High School and graduated in 1987.

Brown received an athletic scholarship to attend the University of Florida in Gainesville, Florida, where she played for coach Mimi Ryan's Florida Gators women's golf team in National Collegiate Athletic Association (NCAA) competition from 1988 to 1991. While playing for the Florida Gators, she was recognized as the Southeastern Conference (SEC) Freshman of the Year in 1988, and received first-team All-SEC and honorable mention All-American honors in 1991. Brown graduated from Florida with a bachelor's degree in health and human performance in 1991.

== LPGA Tour and college golf coach ==
Brown joined the LPGA Tour in 1994. She played on the Tour from 1994 to 1997, and her best finish was a tie for ninth in the Jamie Farr Toledo Classic. In 1998, Laura Brown became the head coach of the Lady Falcons women's golf team of Daytona State College in Daytona Beach, Florida.

== See also ==
- List of Florida Gators women's golfers on the LPGA Tour
- List of University of Florida alumni
