= Higashio =

Higashio (written: 東尾) is a Japanese surname. Notable people with the surname include:

- Osamu Higashio (東尾 修, born 1950), Japanese baseball player
- Riko Higashio (東尾 理子, born 1975), Japanese golfer
