= Buster Bishop =

American college golf coach (1920–2004)

Biographical details
- Born: 1920; Gainesville, Florida, U.S.
- Died: November 19, 2004 (aged 84); Gainesville, Florida, U.S.
- Education: University of Florida

Coaching career (HC unless noted)
- 1964–1978: University of Florida

Accomplishments and honors

Championships
- NCAA (1968, 1973); SEC (1968, 1973, 1974, 1975)

Awards
- SEC Coach of the Year (1973, 1974, 1975); University of Florida Athletic Hall of Fame; GCAA Coaches Hall of Fame

Bernays Emery "Buster" Bishop (1920 – November 19, 2004) was an American college golf coach. Bishop was best known for leading the Florida Gators men's golf team of the University of Florida to National Collegiate Athletic Association (NCAA) Division I championships in 1968 and 1973.

== Early life and education ==
Bishop was born in Gainesville, Florida. He attended Gainesville High School, graduating in 1939. He then enrolled in the University of Florida, where he earned his bachelor's degree in education in 1944, and his master's degree in physical education in 1955.

== Coaching career ==
After graduating from the University of Florida, Bishop became the head of the physical education program at Buchholz Junior High School in Gainesville. He later became the head football coach and athletic director at Gainesville High School, before accepting an appointment as a professor of physical education at the University of Florida.

Bishop became the head coach of the Florida Gators golf team of the University of Florida in 1964. Under his tutelage, the Gators won the 1968 NCAA national championship; it was the first national championship in any sport for the university's intercollegiate athletics program. Five years later, the Gators won a second NCAA national championship in 1973. The Gators were also the runners-up at the NCAA national championship tournament in 1967 and 1974.

During Bishop's tenure as head coach, the Gators won four SEC team championships (1968, 1973, 1974, 1975), and only finished worse than third in the ten-team SEC once in his fifteen seasons leading the team. His fellow SEC coaches recognized him three consecutive seasons as the conference's Coach of the Year (1973, 1974, 1975). Starting in 1970, eight of his Gators received sixteen first-team All-SEC honors.

Individually, his Gators golfers won three U.S. Amateurs: Bob Murphy (1965), Steve Melnyk (1969), and Fred Ridley (1975). Murphy also won the NCAA individual title (1966). Six of his student-athletes won eight individual Southeastern Conference (SEC) titles: Steve Melnyk (1968), Jimmy McQuillan (1971), Gary Koch (1973, 1974), Phil Hancock (1975, 1976), Sam Trahan (1977) and Larry Rinker (1978). Fifteen of Bishop's golfers earned a total of twenty-five All-American honors between 1964 and 1978.

Strangely, Bishop had never played golf before becoming the head coach of the Gators golf team. When he started to play following his appointment as coach, he went from novice to breaking 80 on the University of Florida Golf Course within a month. His players remembered him as a "master motivator."

The Golf Coaches Association of America (GCAA) inducted him into its Coaches Hall of Fame in 1982. He was also inducted into the University of Florida Athletic Hall of Fame as an "honorary letter winner" in 1996.

== Death and legacy ==
Bishop died in Gainesville in 2004; he was 84 years old. He was survived by his wife of forty-eight years, JoAnn O'Donnell Bishop, and their three daughters and son. Following his death, former Gators golfers and fans established an endowed University of Florida athletic scholarship fund in his name.

== See also ==
- Florida Gators
- History of the University of Florida
- List of Florida Gators golfers
- List of University of Florida alumni
- List of University of Florida Athletic Hall of Fame members
- Mimi Ryan
- University Athletic Association
