= Beverley Davis =

American golfer and instructor (born c.1957)

Personal information
- Full name: Beverley S. Davis
- Nationality: United States
- Born: c. 1957 (age 68–69)

Career
- Sport: Golf
- College: University of Florida
- Turned professional: 1980
- Former tour: LPGA Tour (1980–1986)

Best results in LPGA major championships
- Chevron Championship: DNP
- Women's PGA C'ship: T57: 1981
- U.S. Women's Open: T10: 1982
- du Maurier Classic: T23: 1980

Achievements and awards
- All-American: 1976, 1979

Beverley S. Davis (born c. 1957) is an American former professional golfer who is currently an instructor with LPGA International.

== Early life and amateur career ==
Davis ranked sixth among the top ten female amateur golfers in America after winning the 1975 Trans-National Championship in 1975.

She accepted an athletic scholarship to attend the University of Florida in Gainesville, Florida, where she played for coach Mimi Ryan's Florida Gators women's golf team in Association for Intercollegiate Athletics for Women (AIAW) competition from 1976 to 1979. As a freshman in 1976, Davis was the runner-up in the AIAW championship behind Nancy Lopez. As a junior, she was a member of the Gators women's team that was the runner-up at the 1978 AIAW championship. During her years as a Gator golfer, Davis was a three-time individual medalist, and was recognized as a first-team All-American in 1976 and 1979.

== Professional career ==
In 1980, Davis and joined the LPGA Tour and competed until 1986. During her six-year stint, she recorded a career-best finish in a tie for fifth at the 1982 Mary Kay Classic and also took tenth in the 1982 U.S. Women's Open, and Davis shot a personal low of 66. She was runner-up in the LPGA Qualifying School in 1980 and 1986.

Davis' recent accomplishments include a 14th-place finish in the 2004 LPGA T&CP National Championship, winning the 2005 LPGA Teaching and Club Professional (T&CP) Southeast Section Team Championship, and a third-place finish in the 2006 LPGA T&CP Northeast Sectional Championship.

== Awards and honors ==
While at University of Florida, she earned All-American honors her freshman and senior years.

== See also ==
- List of Florida Gators women's golfers on the LPGA Tour
- List of University of Florida alumni
