= 2005 Lexus Cup =

Annual golf match

- Dates: 9–11 December 2005
- Venue: Tanah Merah Country Club
- Location: Singapore
- Captains: Grace Park (Asia); Annika Sörenstam (International)
Asia	8	16	International
- International team wins the Lexus Cup

The 2005 Lexus Cup was the inaugural edition of the annual golf match competed by women representing Asia and an international squad. Each team was made up of twelve members. The competition took place at the Tanah Merah Country Club in Singapore from 9–11 December 2005. Lexus was he title sponsor while Rolex, DBS, Singapore Airlines, and Singapore Sports Council are main sponsors. The total purse was US$960,000, with $50,000 going to each member of the winning team and $30,000 to members of the other team.

The International team won solidly in the first annual event, 16 points to 8.

== Teams ==
As in the similar team events of the Ryder Cup (USA vs. Europe men), Presidents Cup (USA vs. "International" men, i.e. rest of the world excluding Europe), and Solheim Cup (USA vs. Europe women), each team consisted of twelve players. Each captain appointed their remaining team members.

Asia

- Grace Park (playing captain) - Seoul, South Korea
- Meena Lee - Jeonju, South Korea
- Hee-Won Han - Seoul, South Korea
- Candie Kung - Kaohsiung, Taiwan
- Birdie Kim - Iksan, South Korea
- Jennifer Rosales - Manila, Philippines
- Jeong Jang - Daejeon, South Korea
- Hee Jung Park - Seoul, South Korea
- (South Korea) Aree Song - Bangkok, Thailand
- (South Korea) Naree Song - Bangkok, Thailand
- Namika Omata - Tokyo, Japan
- Riko Higashio - Fukuoka, Japan

International

- Annika Sörenstam (playing captain) - Stockholm, Sweden
- (United States) Paula Creamer - Mountain View, California
- (United States) Natalie Gulbis - Sacramento, California
- Karen Stupples - Dover, England
- Janice Moodie - Glasgow, Scotland
- Catriona Matthew - Edinburgh, Scotland
- Carin Koch - Kungalv, Sweden
- Sophie Gustafson - Särö, Sweden
- (United States) Erica Blasberg - Orange, California
- (United States) Jill McGill - Denver, Colorado
- Marisa Baena - Pereira, Colombia
- Suzann Pettersen - Oslo, Norway

== Day one ==
9 December 2005

Day one saw six foursome matches where each team put two golfers on the course for each match, with the two playing alternate shots. Asia won two early matches, but the Int'l team won the other four.

Asia Team	Results	International Team
Hee-Won Han/Candie Kung	Asia 5&4	Carin Koch/Janice Moodie
Grace Park/Jennifer Rosales	Int'l 3&2	Sophie Gustafson/Suzann Pettersen
Naree Song/Aree Song	Asia 5&4	Natalie Gulbis/Jill McGill
Jeong Jang/Meena Lee	Int'l 2&1	Annika Sörenstam/Paula Creamer
Birdie Kim/Hee Jung Park	Int'l 2&1	Marisa Baena/Erica Blasberg
Riko Higashio/Namika Omata	Int'l 5&4	Catriona Matthew/Karen Stupples
2	Foursomes	4
2	Overall	4

== Day two ==
10 December 2005

The two teams matched up in four ball competition on day two. The international team won three matches to one, with two others being halved, to give them an 8 to 4 lead going into Sunday's singles.

Asia Team	Results	International Team
Hee-Won Han/Birdie Kim	Int'l 4&2	Carin Koch/Marisa Baena
Aree Song/Naree Song	Int'l 4&3	Sophie Gustafson/Suzann Pettersen
Candie Kung/Jeong Jang	Int'l 3&2	Paula Creamer/Natalie Gulbis
Grace Park/Riko Higashio	Asia 3&2	Janice Moodie/Catriona Matthew
Jennifer Rosales/Namika Omata	Halved	Erica Blasberg/Jill McGill
Meena Lee/Hee Jung Park	Halved	Annika Sörenstam/Karen Stupples
2	Four balls	4
4	Overall	8

== Day three ==
11 December 2005

On day three, the international team won 8 singles matches to 4, for a final margin of 16 to 8.

Asia Team	Results	International Team
Grace Park	Int'l 2&1	Annika Sörenstam
Birdie Kim	Int'l 7&5	Paula Creamer
Jeong Jang	Asia 1 up	Jill McGill
Hee-Won Han	Asia 2 up	Marisa Baena
Candie Kung	Asia 5&4	Janice Moodie
Meena Lee	Int'l 3&1	Natalie Gulbis
Aree Song	Int'l 1 up	Sophie Gustafson
Riko Higashio	Int'l 3&2	Erica Blasberg
Naree Song	Int'l 4&3	Karen Stupples
Hee Jung Park	Int'l 2&1	Carin Koch
Jennifer Rosales	Asia 4&3	Catriona Matthew
Namika Omata	Int'l 1 up	Suzann Pettersen
4	Singles	8
8	Overall	16

== Golfer records ==
Golfer	Country	Wins	Halves	Losses
Paula Creamer	United States	3	0	0
Sophie Gustafson	Sweden	3	0	0
Suzann Pettersen	Norway	3	0	0
Erica Blasberg	United States	2	1	0
Annika Sörenstam	Sweden	2	1	0
Karen Stupples	England	2	1	0
Marisa Baena	Colombia	2	0	1
Natalie Gulbis	United States	2	0	1
Hee-Won Han	South Korea	2	0	1
Carin Koch	Sweden	2	0	1
Candie Kung	Taiwan	2	0	1
Jennifer Rosales	Philippines	1	1	1
Riko Higashio	Japan	1	0	2
Jeong Jang	South Korea	1	0	2
Catriona Matthew	Scotland	1	0	2
Grace Park	South Korea	1	0	2
Aree Song	South Korea	1	0	2
Naree Song	South Korea	1	0	2
Meena Lee	South Korea	0	1	2
Jill McGill	United States	0	1	2
Namika Omata	Japan	0	1	2
Hee Jung Park	South Korea	0	1	2
Birdie Kim	South Korea	0	0	3
Janice Moodie	Scotland	0	0	3
