= Erica Blasberg =

American professional golfer (1984–2010)

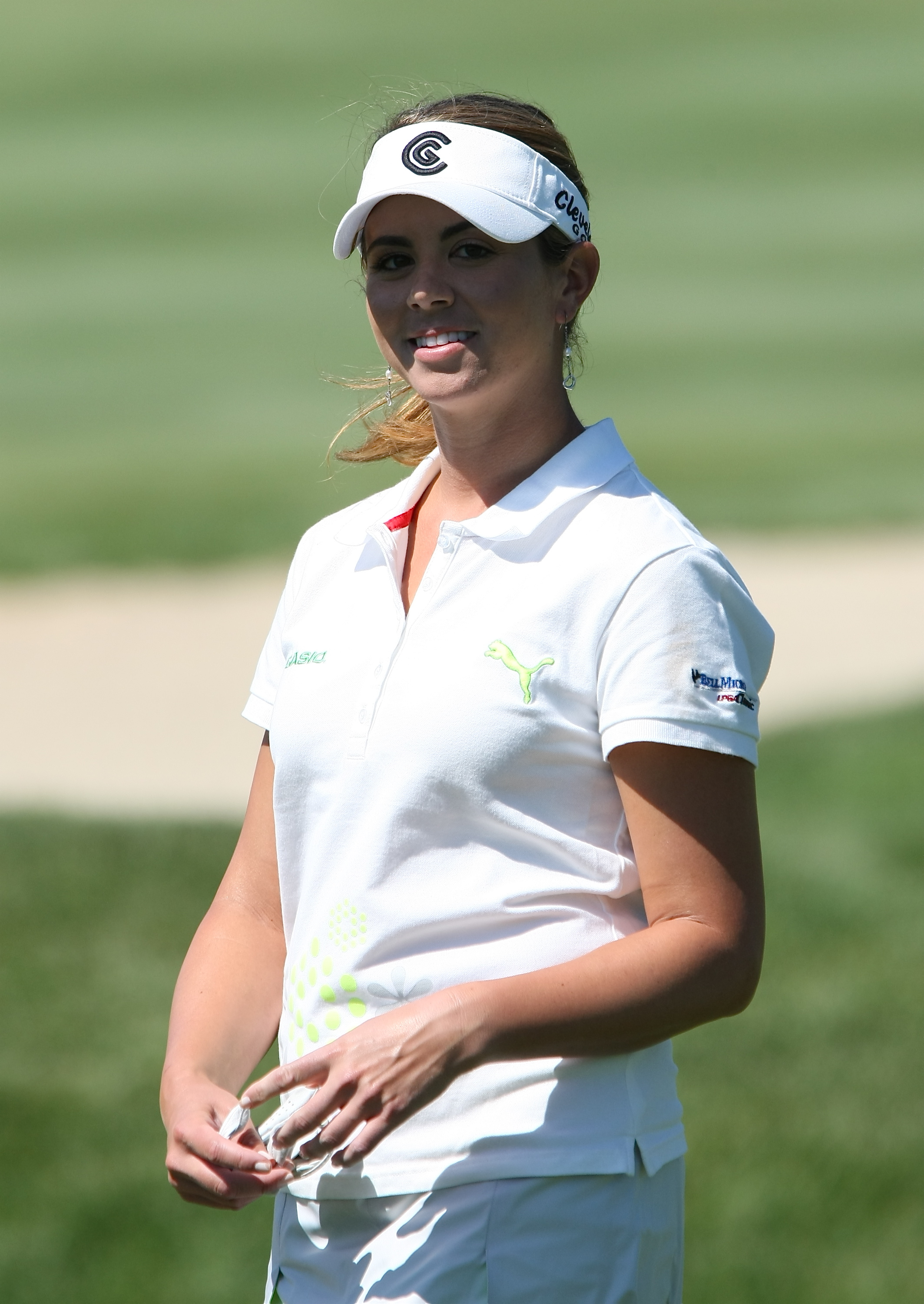
- Blasberg at the 2008 LPGA Championship

Personal information
- Full name: Erica Paige Blasberg
- Nickname: Skip
- Nationality: United States
- Born: July 14, 1984 Orange, California, U.S.
- Died: May 9, 2010 (aged 25) Henderson, Nevada, U.S.
- Height: 5 ft 6 in (1.68 m)

Career
- Sport: Golf
- College: University of Arizona (two years)
- Turned professional: 2004
- Current tours: LPGA (joined 2005)
- Former tours: Futures Tour (joined 2004)
- Professional wins: 1

Number of wins by tour
- Epson Tour: 1

Best results in LPGA major championships
- Chevron Championship: CUT: 2004
- Women's PGA C'ship: T76: 2007
- U.S. Women's Open: T39: 2007
- Women's British Open: T64: 2008

Erica Paige Blasberg (July 14, 1984 – May 9, 2010) was an American professional golfer who played on the LPGA Tour. She attended the University of Arizona, and was the country's #1 ranked college player as a freshman. In 2004, she won the Laconia Savings Bank Golf Classic.

== Early life ==
Blasberg was born in Orange, California, on July 14, 1984, to Debra, who worked for Avis Car Rental, and Mel Blasberg, who at the time worked in the automobile business, and then as a golf coach). She was Jewish. She was raised in Corona, California, 40 miles east of Los Angeles.

Blasberg was the medalist at the 2000 U.S. Girls' Junior, and lost in the quarterfinals. She won the 2002 Rolex Tournament of Champions.

She attended Coronita Elementary and then Corona High School, where she had a 4.0 GPA, starred on the boys' golf team, and was the Mountain View League individual champion and MVP, graduating in 2002.

== Amateur career ==
She attended the University of Arizona, and was the United States' #1 college player as a freshman, compiling six victories for the Arizona Wildcats before leaving in her sophomore year to turn pro. Blasberg was an All-American golfer in 2003 and 2004, 2003 NCAA Freshman of the Year, 2003 Pac-10 Player of the Year and Freshman of the Year, and won the 2003 Golfstat Cup, awarded for having the NCAA women's lowest stroke average (72.36). In 2003, she reached the quarterfinals of the U.S. Women's Amateur.

Golfweek put her on its cover. In 2004, she was on the winning United States Curtis Cup team against Great Britain and Ireland.

== Professional career ==
Blasberg turned professional in June 2004, at 19 years of age, and played on the LPGA Futures Tour that season. She won the Laconia Savings Bank Golf Classic, and en route to her first professional win broke the Future Tour's 18-hole scoring record, shooting a 62. She earned non-exempt status for the LPGA Tour at the 2004 LPGA Final Qualifying Tournament.

Blasberg started on the LPGA Tour in 2005, making the cut in most of her early events but not contending for top positions. She was disqualified from the Chick-fil-A Charity Championship in May 2005, after scoring a 70 – the lowest round of her season, when she accidentally walked 10 steps from the scoring tent before returning to it to give in her card, after taking photographs with fans and signing autographs, before submitting her scorecard which she had signed. Blasberg later told reporters that the rule infraction was poorly handled by the officials, and that she should not have received a penalty. The next week she made a hole in one and won a Mercury SUV. At mid-season she fired her caddie, because she "needed a change." She was chosen to play in the 2005 Lexus Cup, where she won two matches and halved another, including a 98-yard hole out on the 18th to win a match. She ended 2005 109th on the money list. In 2006, despite a late season rally she once again finished just outside the top 100 on the money list at # 112, but a successful tournament at Qualifying School in the fall of 2006 won her exempt status for 2007 — the first and only time in her career she had exempt status on the LPGA Tour.

In 2007, she finished 104th on the money list. Blasberg chose not to return to Qualifying School, leaving her once again as a non-exempt player for 2008. In 2008, she earned a career-best tie for eighth at the SBS Open in Hawaii, and over $113,000 ($169,000 in current dollar terms) in winnings. Her results were only marginally better than in 2007. She played 23 tournaments and, while she did earn the only top-10 finish of her career, she again finished near the bottom of the LPGA money list.

Blasberg returned again to Qualifying School in 2009 in an attempt to improve her status on Tour for the 2010 season, but withdrew after shooting rounds of 72 and 78 in the final stage of the Tournament. In 2009 she was 128th on the money list. She entered 2010 with limited playing opportunities and played just one tournament, the Tres Marias Championship in Morelia, Mexico, where she finished 44th after Monday qualifying for the event. During the tournament week, Blasberg participated in a "Back to College" event at which she joined fellow players Mina Harigae and Mariajo Uribe in visiting student-athletes at the Universidad Latina De America in Morelia to answer questions on golf and education.

Blasberg was considered one of the LPGA's more photogenic players, and in February 2006 Puma signed her to a multi-year endorsement deal, to be the first female golfer to endorse and wear their clothing. She has been compared to Natalie Gulbis, an LPGA golfer who did a swimsuit calendar. She also was signed to endorsement deals with Casio and Cleveland Golf.

== Death ==
On the afternoon of May 9, 2010, Blasberg was found dead with a plastic bag secured over her head in her bed at her home in Anthem, Nevada, outside of Las Vegas, at age 25. Officers were dispatched to her residence in response to a 911 call by Dr. Thomas Hess, Blasberg's doctor, around 3:00 p.m. (PT). In an interview with Press-Enterprise on May 10, Blasberg's father, Mel Blasberg, said, "At first glance it looks like she might have taken her own life, but at second glance, something is very, very strange about it. We're waiting for the police to make an investigation."

Two days before she died, Blasberg and the married 43-year-old Hess played golf at the Southern Highlands Golf Club outside Las Vegas. Her friend Jay Beckman saw her on the course, and said, "She was making fun of my shirt. She seemed fine. She seemed normal. She seemed like Erica." Hess and Blasberg then went to a hotel in Henderson, where they watched a hockey game on TV in its lounge, and were seen touching hands and with the married Hess's hand on Blasberg's leg. Hess bought a prepaid cellular telephone the following day, which he used only to call Blasberg, and drove to her home and later left what he said was a drunk Blasberg at 9 pm at her home the night before she died. The coroner, however, said she had no alcohol in her system, only drugs.

Blasberg tried to call Hess about 3:30 a.m. the following morning, and Hess tried to call Blasberg eight times that morning starting at 5:13 a.m, and nine times that afternoon, before going to her home at 3 p.m. and discovering her body. Blasberg was in bed with a dust mask over her mouth, and a plastic bag over her head, kept in place by rubber bands. Hess then removed pills and a four-page handwritten letter addressed to "Whoever", and hid them in the trunk of his Mercedes-Benz.

Police later found Blasberg's suicide note and some of her prescription medications in the trunk of Hess's car. According to her father's attorney, Hess had prescribed the medications for Blasberg.

Missy Pederson, who was supposed to be Blasberg's caddie at a May 10 qualifying round for the Bell Micro LPGA Classic in Mobile, Alabama, told The New York Times that Blasberg had sent her a text at 4:03 am on May 9. In the message, Blasberg told Pederson she was not going to play in the tournament. A worried Pederson sent a text back to Blasberg, asking if she was all right, but Blasberg never replied. However, Blasberg's agent revealed that Blasberg's bags were packed for a tournament in Mobile at the time of her death. The days prior to her death, Blasberg had been busy and appeared normal, working on her golf game, buying curtains for her bedroom at her father's house, and having a round of Botox injections.

On May 13, 2010, police in Henderson, Nevada, executed a search warrant, raiding the home and office of Dr. Thomas Hess in the investigation into Blasberg's death; he had been with her the night that she died. The search warrant listed an anti-anxiety medication, Xanax, plastic garbage bags, and a sample of Hess' handwriting. An inventory of the materials seized in the search of Hess' house included two computers, a cell phone, two video cameras, and a GPS unit. A computer and white trash bags were seized from Hess' office. Small white plastic trash bags, identical to ones seized from Hess' office or home, had been found next to Blasberg's bed. On June 2, 2010, Blasberg's father appeared on The Early Show, where he denied that his daughter had been clinically depressed, in financial troubles, or unhappy with her recent performances.

On August 24, 2010, the Clark County, Nevada coroner's office ruled Blasberg's death a suicide with asphyxia cited as the primary cause of death, and toxic levels of multiple prescription drugs cited as an additional "significant factor." Drugs in Blasberg's system included codeine and hydrocodone, both pain relievers, tramadol, temazepam (a sleep aid), alprazolam (Xanax; an anti-anxiety medication), and butalbital (a migraine medication), according to the coroner. Nevada law does not permit the release of details on the amounts of medication found in autoposies.

Blasberg is interred at Pacific View Memorial Park in Corona del Mar, California.

=== Obstruction of justice charges ===
Henderson police said foul play was not suspected. However, they issued an arrest warrant on obstruction of justice charges for Hess, who was arrested on August 24, 2010. Hess was released about 35 minutes after he was arrested and booked into jail, on $637 bail.

In November 2010, Hess admitted that he had removed a suicide note and the prescription medication he had given Blasberg from her bed stand at the scene, hiding them in his car, which he said was "to spare the family embarrassment"; he had never met the family. Her suicide note said that Blasberg had attempted suicide many times in the months leading up to her death, and she said she felt lonely and tormented by the lack of success in her golf career. "I'm sad and don't want to be doing this right now," she said in the note. "Sorry for all the people I've hurt doing this, but please understand how miserable and sad I am, and that I feel no way of escaping it." His actions followed his 911 call in which the emergency operator told Hess, "Try not to touch anything," and he replied, "Yes ma'am." While Hess called in the suicide from Blasberg's home, when the police arrived they found Blasberg's body alone at the scene. Hess temporarily stopped cooperating with the police.

Hess later pleaded guilty to misdemeanor obstruction, which carried maximum penalties of a $1,000 fine and six months in jail. He was sentenced to one year’s probation, 40 hours of community service at Volunteers of Medicine of Southern Nevada, and impulse-control counseling.

=== Wrongful death lawsuit ===
Blasberg's parents filed a wrongful death and malpractice suit against Hess. On May 13, 2014, a jury found that Hess had no liability in the death.

== Professional wins (1) ==
=== Futures Tour wins (1) ===
- 2004 (1) Laconia Savings Bank Golf Classic

== Results in LPGA majors ==
Tournament	2004	2005	2006	2007	2008	2009	2010
Kraft Nabisco Championship	CUT						
LPGA Championship				T76	CUT	CUT	–
U.S. Women's Open	CUT			T39			–
Women's British Open					T64		–

Did not play

CUT = missed the half-way cut
"T" = tied

== LPGA Tour career summary ==
Year	Tournaments played	Cuts made	Wins	2nd	3rd	Top 10s	Best finish	Official earnings ($)	Money list rank	Scoring average	Scoring rank
2003	1	0	0	0	0	0	T49	n/a	n/a	68.75	n/a
2004	3	0	0	0	0	0	MC	n/a	n/a	75.83	n/a
2005	16	12	0	0	0	0	T31	52,522	T109	73.23	75
2006	16	10	0	0	0	0	T25	62,477	112	72.37	58
2007	19	11	0	0	0	0	T18	72,037	104	73.45	80
2008	23	11	0	0	0	1	T8	113,428	94	73.09	96
2009	17	5	0	0	0	0	T36	26,408	128	73.55	113
2010	1	1	0	0	0	0	T44	5,544	97^{1}	73.00	n/a

^{1}Money list ranking as of May 2, 2010, at the end of her last tournament.

== Team appearances ==
Amateur

- Junior Ryder Cup (representing the United States): 1999
- Curtis Cup: (representing the United States): 2004 (winners)

Professional

- Lexus Cup (representing International team): 2005 (winners)
