= Wendy Ward =

American professional golfer (born 1973)

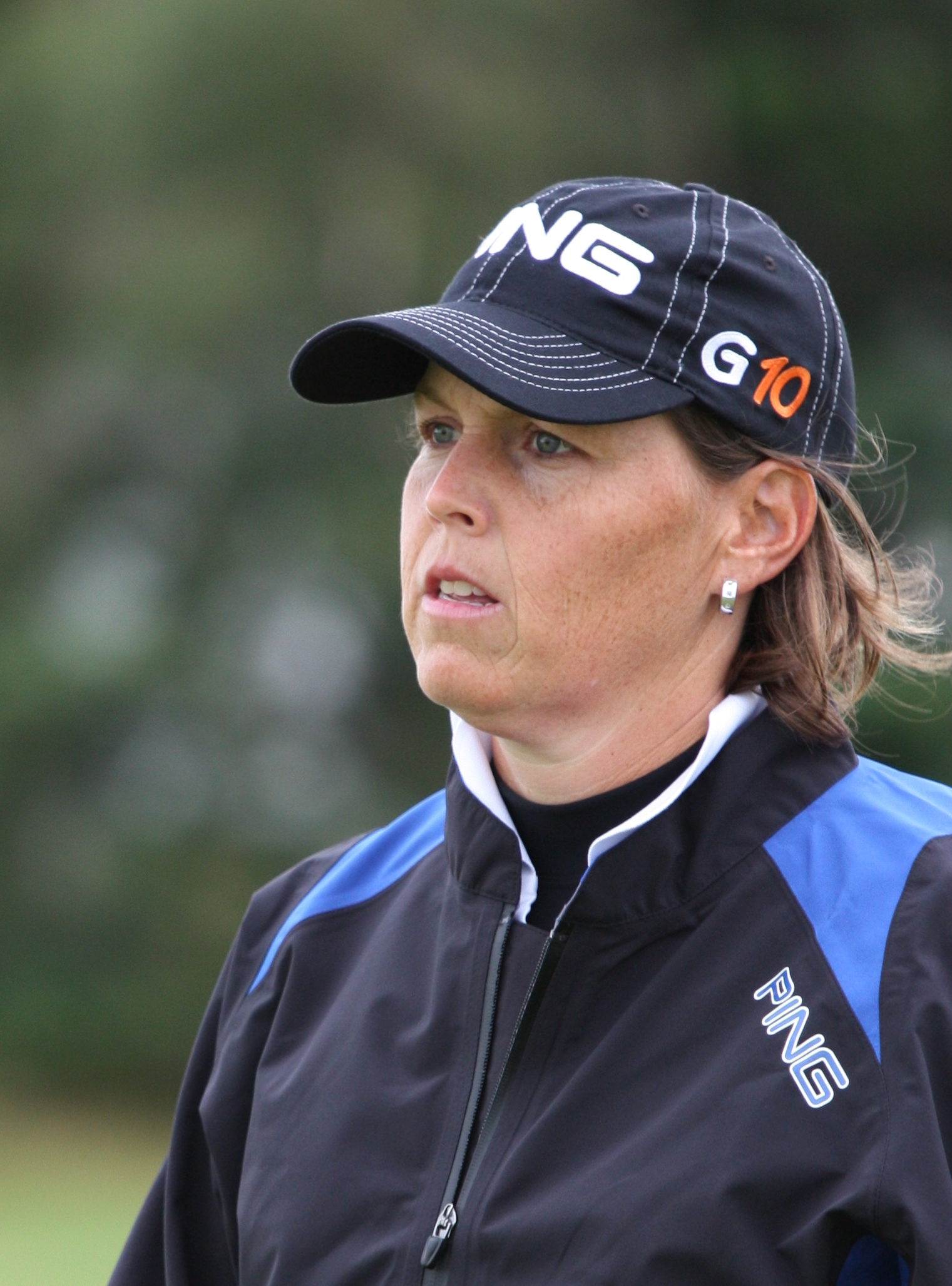
- Ward at the 2009 Women's British Open

Personal information
- Nationality: United States
- Born: May 6, 1973 (age 53) San Antonio, Texas, U.S.
- Height: 5 ft 9 in (1.75 m)
- Spouse: Nate Hair (m. 1998)

Career
- Sport: Golf
- College: Arizona State University (graduated 1995)
- Turned professional: 1995
- Former tour: LPGA Tour (1996–2013)
- Professional wins: 4

Number of wins by tour
- LPGA Tour: 4

Best results in LPGA major championships
- Chevron Championship: T28: 2004
- Women's PGA C'ship: T3: 2000, 2001
- U.S. Women's Open: T14: 2010
- du Maurier Classic: T16: 1997
- Women's British Open: T6: 2003
- Evian Championship: DNP

Achievements and awards
- Honda Award: 1994, 1995

Wendy Ward (born May 6, 1973) is an American professional golfer who played on the LPGA Tour.

== Early life and amateur career ==
Ward was born in San Antonio, Texas in 1973

Ward attended Arizona State University. She had a successful National Collegiate Athletic Association (NCAA) career. She was a two-time Honda Sports Award winner, a three-time first team All-American, the Pac-10 Champion in 1993 and 1995 and led ASU to team titles in 1993, 1994, and 1995. In 1995, she graduated with a degree in business Management.

In 1994, she won the U.S. Women's Amateur and represented the U.S. in the Curtis Cup, the biennial team competition between amateur golfers from the United States and those from Great Britain and Ireland.

== Professional career ==
Ward turned professional in 1995 and qualified for the LPGA Tour on her first attempt to become a rookie in 1996. Her first win came at the 1997 Fieldcrest Cannon Classic where she set both the all-time 54 and 72-hole LPGA scoring records; both records have since been broken.

She won four tournaments on the tour. Her best season was 2001, when she finished 12th on the official LPGA Tour money list.

Ward was a member of the 2002, 2003 and 2005 U.S. Solheim Cup teams. She was also selected as an assistant captain to Juli Inkster for the 2015 Solheim Cup team.

== Personal life ==
Ward lives on a 300-acre (1.2 km^{2}) cattle ranch in Edwall, Washington where she operates a cow/calf beef operation with her husband, Nate Hair.

== Professional wins (4) ==
=== LPGA Tour wins (4) ===
No.	Date	Tournament	Winning score	Margin of victory	Runner(s)-up
1	Sep 28, 1997	Fieldcrest Cannon Classic	−23 (66-65-64-70=265)	2 strokes	(United States) Jane Geddes (United States) Rosie Jones
2	Feb 21, 1998	Cup Noodles Hawaiian Ladies Open	−4 (65-69-70=204)	Playoff	(United States) Dana Dormann
3	Aug 12, 2001	Wendy's Championship for Children	−21 (65-62-68=195)	3 strokes	(United States) Moira Dunn (Sweden) Annika Sörenstam
4	Apr 16, 2005	LPGA Takefuji Classic	−16 (65-68-67=200)	2 strokes	(Mexico) Lorena Ochoa

LPGA Tour playoff record (1–2)

No.	Year	Tournament	Opponent	Result
1	1998	Cup Noodles Hawaiian Ladies Open	(United States) Dana Dormann	Won with par on first extra hole
2	2001	LPGA Champions Classic	(Australia) Wendy Doolan	Lost to birdie on fifth extra hole
3	2003	Wendy's Championship for Children	(South Korea) Hee-Won Han	Lost to birdie on third extra hole

== Results in LPGA majors ==
Results not in chronological order

Tournament	1996	1997	1998	1999	2000
Chevron Championship			CUT	T33	T43
Women's PGA Championship	CUT	T25	T4	CUT	T3
U.S. Women's Open	T19	CUT	T19	T40	
du Maurier Classic	T53	T16	T34	T20	T55

Tournament	2001	2002	2003	2004	2005	2006	2007	2008	2009
Chevron Championship	T36	T36	T48	T28	T50	T35	WD	T58	T36
Women's PGA Championship	T3	CUT	T11	T30	CUT	T16	CUT	CUT	CUT
U.S. Women's Open	T19	CUT	CUT	CUT	T36	T41	CUT		
Women's British Open ^	CUT	T56	T6	T56	CUT	T67	T23	T59	CUT

Tournament	2010	2011	2012	2013	...	2024
Chevron Championship	CUT	T33	T56			
U.S. Women's Open	T14	T34	CUT			
Women's PGA Championship	T67	CUT	CUT	CUT		CUT
Women's British Open		CUT				
The Evian Championship ^^						

^ The Women's British Open replaced the du Maurier Classic as an LPGA major in 2001.
^^ The Evian Championship was added as a major in 2013.

Top 10
Did not play

CUT = missed the half-way cut
WD = withdrew
"T" = tied

=== Summary ===
- Starts – 63
- Wins – 0
- 2nd-place finishes – 0
- 3rd-place finishes – 2
- Top 3 finishes – 2
- Top 5 finishes – 3
- Top 10 finishes – 4
- Top 25 finishes – 14
- Missed cuts – 23
- Most consecutive cuts made – 8
- Longest streak of top-10s – 1

== U.S. national team appearances ==
Amateur

- Curtis Cup: 1994 (tie)
- Espirito Santo Trophy: 1994 (winners)

Professional

- Solheim Cup: 2002 (winners), 2003, 2005 (winners)

=== Solheim Cup record ===
Year	Total matches	Total W–L–H	Singles W–L–H	Foursomes W–L–H	Fourballs W–L–H	Points won	Points %
Career	11	2–8–1	0–2–1	2–3–0	0–3–0	2.5	23%
2002	4	2–1–1	0–0–1 halved w/ A. Sörenstam	2–0–0 won w/ B. Daniel 1 up, won w/ E. Klein 3&2	0–1–0 lost w/ B. Daniel 4&3	2.5	62.5%
2003	4	0–4–0	0–1–0 lost to I. Tinning 2&1	0–2–0 lost w/ J. Inkster 5&3, lost w/ H. Bowie 3&2	0–1–0 lost w/ R. Jones 4&3	0	0%
2005	3	0–3–0	0–1–0 lost to C. Matthew 3&2	0–1–0 lost w/ L. Diaz 5&3	0–1–0 lost w/ P. Hurst 2&1	0	0%
