= Renee Heiken =

American golf coach (born 1972)

Renee Slone (née Heiken; born June 2, 1972) is the women's golf coach at the University of Illinois since 2006. Before her coaching career, Renee Heiken had "16 collegiate wins ... between 1990 and 1993" in golf. She was nominated for a Honda Sports Award in 1991 and was the 1993 Women's Golf Coaches Association Division I Player of the Year. During her 1990s playing career, she was runner-up in prize winnings during the 1994 Futures Tour. Her 1996 tie for the lowest LPGA Tour 9-hole raw score was broken by Jimin Kang during 2005.

Heiken worked as an assistant coach for Bradley University and the University of Illinois during the early 2000s. Leading up to 2006, she went to Brevard, North Carolina to become an assistant professional. With Illinois, Slone's team won their "first Big Ten women's golf championship" in 2023. She joined the WGCA Players Hall of Fame in 2006 and the Illinois Sports Hall of Fame in 2025.

== Early life and education ==
Heiken's birth occurred in Peoria, Illinois, on June 2, 1972. She was introduced to golf by her father during 1979. At state events, "Heiken won the overall title at the Illinois PGA State Junior Tournament" between 1985 and 1988. During this time period, Heiken's Illinois Junior Girls' Amateur Golf Championship wins occurred in 1987 and 1988. She won the Illinois High School Association Girls Golf Championship in 1987 and 1989.

Heiken was first at the 1985 Pepsi Little People's Golf Championships in the 12-13 Girls Division. She was in the first round of the Women's Western Junior the following year. She was the runner-up at the Rolex Tournament of Champions and Girls Junior PGA Championship during 1989.

Heiken joined the University of Illinois in 1990. She had "16 collegiate wins ... between 1990 and 1993" in golf. During this time period, Heiken won the Big Ten Women's Golf Championship in 1991 and 1993. She was tied for third at the 1991 NCAA women's golf championship.

== Career ==
=== Playing career ===
Heiken was second at the Illinois State Women's Amateur Championship during 1988 and 1991. At the Women's Trans National, she was a quarterfinalist in 1990 and 1991. Heiken was a semifinalist at the 1991 Women's Western Amateur.

In April 1993, Heiken considered becoming a professional golfer instead of completing her business administration program. Following her education, she joined the Futures Tour in June 1993. Heiken had a second place tie at the 1994 Orville Beckford Ford Futures Classic. She was runner-up in prize winnings after the 1994 season.

Heiken attempted to receive a spot on the LPGA Tour during 1993. She joined in 1994. Her first event was during 1995. That year, she had a tie for 38th at the LPGA Championship and a 53rd place tie at the du Maurier Classic. These were held as major golf championships.

Heiken has a 12th place tie at the 1996 Edina Realty LPGA Classic. She tied the lowest 9-hole raw score in the LPGA at the Jamie Farr Kroger Classic that year. Heiken's shared record was broken in 2005 by Jimin Kang. She played in the LPGA Tour during 1997. After that year's wedding, Renee Heiken Patterson joined the Futures Tour in 1998. She ended her playing career during 2000.

=== Additional career ===
During 2000, Heiken joined Bradley University's golf team as an assistant coach. The following year, she continued her experience with the University of Illinois. Renee Slone went to Brevard, North Carolina for her assistant professional career during the 2000s. With Sherwood Forest Golf Course, she was their manager from 2005 to 2006.

Slone became coach of the women's golf team at the University of Illinois during 2006. Slone's team made their NCAA Division I Women's Golf Championship debut in 2019. They had a ninth place tie at the event. Her team won their "first Big Ten women's golf championship" in 2023.

== Awards and honors ==
Heiken was part of the 1986 Rolex Junior All-America Team for the American Junior Golf Association. Additional selections from the AJGA were in 1988 and 1989. The Greater Peoria Sports Hall of Fame selected Heiken as their 1989 Tri-County Sports Figure of the Year.

Between 1991 and 1993, Heiken was the Big Ten Conference Golfer of the Year twice and All-Big Ten three times. She received three All-American selections from the Women's Golf Coaches Association during this time period. Heiken was their 1993 Division I Player of the Year. She was nominated for a Honda Sports Award in 1991. Heiken was a University of Illinois Athlete of the Year co-recipient in 1991 and 1992. While at Illinois, she received the Big Ten Women's Golf Coach of the Year in 2019.

Heiken joined the WGCA Players Hall of Fame during 2005. She became an Illinois Women's Golf Association Hall of Fame member in 2013. Slone became part of the University of Illinois Athletics Hall of Fame in 2017 and the Illinois Sports Hall of Fame in 2025.
