= Fieldcrest Cannon Classic =

Golf tournament formerly on the LPGA Tour

The Fieldcrest Cannon Classic was a golf tournament on the LPGA Tour from 1995 to 1997. It was played at the Peninsula Country Club in the Charlotte, North Carolina suburb of Cornelius.

== Winners ==
- 1997 Wendy Ward
- 1996 Trish Johnson
- 1995 Gail Graham
