= Heather Daly-Donofrio =

American professional golfer (born 1969)

Personal information
- Nationality: United States
- Born: September 10, 1969 (age 57) Bridgeport, Connecticut, U.S.
- Height: 5 ft 1 in (1.55 m)

Career
- Sport: Golf
- College: Yale University
- Turned professional: 1993
- Former tours: LPGA Tour (1998–2008); Futures Tour (1991–1997)
- Professional wins: 5

Number of wins by tour
- LPGA Tour: 2
- Epson Tour: 3

Best results in LPGA major championships
- Chevron Championship: T31: 2008
- Women's PGA C'ship: T26: 2001
- U.S. Women's Open: CUT: 1995, 1997, 2000-03, 2005, 2008-09
- du Maurier Classic: T49: 1999
- Women's British Open: T47: 2002

Achievements and awards
- LPGA William and Mousie Powell Award: 2005

Heather Daly-Donofrio (born September 10, 1969) is an American professional golfer who played on the LPGA Tour.

== Early life and amateur career ==
Daly-Donofrio was born in Bridgeport, Connecticut. She attended Yale University and played on the Yale Golf Team. In 1991, she graduated with a degree in history.

== Professional career ==
She turned professional in 1993. Daly-Donofrio played on the Futures Tour from 1995 to 1997, winning three times.

Daly-Donofrio joined the LPGA Tour in 1998 and won twice, in 2001 and 2004. She also coached the Yale Bulldogs women's golf team from 1997 to 2000 while playing full-time. She also served as president of the LPGA Tour Executive Committee in 2005 and 2006.

== Awards and honors ==
- In 2005, she received the LPGA's William and Mousie Powell Award
- In 2010, Daly-Donofrio was inducted into the Connecticut Golf Hall of Fame

== Professional wins (5) ==
=== LPGA Tour wins (2) ===
No.	Date	Tournament	Winning score	Margin of victory	Runner(s)-up
1	Aug 26, 2001	First Union Betsy King Classic	−15 (65-71-68-69=273)	1 stroke	(United States) Moira Dunn (Scotland) Mhairi McKay
2	Nov 14, 2004	The Mitchell Company Tournament of Champions	−19 (69-64-66-70=269)	4 strokes	(United States) Laura Diaz

=== Futures Tour wins (3) ===
- 1995 Greater Lima Futures Open
- 1997 Ronald McDonald House Futures Classic, Quail Heights Futures Classic
