= Keney Park Golf Course =

Golf course in Connecticut

- Location within Connecticut
- 41.805432°N 72.671478°W

Club information
- Location: Hartford, Connecticut and Windsor, Connecticut
- Established: 1927
- Type: Public
- Total holes: 18
- Website: keneyparkgolfcourse.com
- Designed by: Devereux Emmet and Robert Ross
- Par: 70
- Length: 6,449 yards
- Course rating: 127
- Slope rating: 70.6

Keney Park Golf Course is a public golf course located in Hartford, Connecticut and Windsor, Connecticut within Hartford's Keney Park. The first nine holes were designed by eminent golf course architect Devereux Emmet in 1927, with the remaining nine made by City of Hartford engineer Robert ”Jack” Ross in 1931.

== History ==
Discussions of building a golf course in Keney Park began as early as 1916 as a means to alleviate congestion in Hartford's Goodwin Park. Goodwin Park was the city's only public golf course at the time, and there was a growing consensus that a new course would help reduce the crowds at Goodwin and improve the skill-set of Hartford players by creating a more challenging course. The course opened on October 13, 1927 at 35 cents for nine holes and 50 cents for 18. Devereux Emmet designed the first nine holes at a cost of $1,500 to the city, Hartford solicited Robert Ross, a city-engineer, to design the remaining nine holes, which premiered on August 29, 1930.

In the second half of the 20th century, Keney Park entered a period of decline and mismanagement which culminated in the city terminating their existing manager and launching a comprehensive refurbishment of the course and club house with the assistance of the Connecticut PGA. Since the refurbishment, the course has received numerous accolades, such as tying for first place in Golf Inc.'s 2016 Public Course Renovation list and being rated 2017's third best public course in the state by Golfweek.

== Course ==
Keney Park
Tee	Rating/Slope	1	2	3	4	5	6	7	8	9	Out	10	11	12	13	14	15	16	17	18	In	Total
Par		4	5	3	4	4	3	4	4	4	35	5	3	4	3	5	4	4	4	3	35	70
Gold		332	509	160	383	428	152	455	407	457	3283	533	237	323	188	513	409	397	369	197	3166	6449

== Facilities ==
The Keney Park Club House was designed by Smith & Bassette, a local firm based in Hartford, Connecticut. The Club House contains the pro shop and a restaurant, The Tavern at Keney Park.
