= List of Florida Gators men's golfers on the PGA Tour =

This List of Florida Gators men's golfers on the PGA Tour includes notable athletes who played for the Florida Gators men's golf team that represents the University of Florida in Gainesville, Florida, and who play or have played golf professionally. These University of Florida alumni played on the PGA Tour and/or on the affiliated Korn Ferry Tour or PGA Tour Champions. The table lists their wins on these tours and other notable golfing achievements.

Name	PGA wins	Korn Ferry wins	Champions wins	Notes
Tommy Aaron	3	–	1	Aaron won the 1973 Masters Tournament; was the runner-up in the 1958 U.S. Amateur and the 1972 PGA Championship.
Wally Armstrong	–	–	–	Armstrong was a PGA Tour member (1973–1983), and the winner of the 1973 Indiana Open.
Pat Bates	–	5	–	Bates was a three-time All-American who won five tournaments on the Nationwide Tour.
Andy Bean	11	–	3	Bean finished second twice in the PGA Championship and once in the British Open. He has been ranked in the top 10 of the Official World Golf Ranking.
Frank Beard	11	–	1	topped the PGA Tour money list in 1969
Woody Blackburn	2	–	–	
Bill Britton	1	–	–	
Mark Calcavecchia	13	–	4	won the 1989 Open Championship
Chris Couch	1	5	–	
Bubba Dickerson	–	1	n/a	won the 2001 U.S. Amateur
Chris DiMarco	3	1	–	has been ranked in the top 10 of the OWGR; runner-up in three majors
Scott Dunlap	–	2	2	won Boeing Classic in 2014
Matt Every	2	1	n/a	
Brian Gay	5	–	–	
Ken Green	5	–	–	
Phil Hancock	1	–	–	
Dudley Hart	2	–	–	has been ranked in the top 50 of the OWGR
Billy Horschel	8	–	n/a	won 2014 FedEx Cup, shot 60 at the 2006 U.S. Amateur, runner-up at 2024 Open Championship
David Jackson	–	1	–	
Gary Koch	6	–	–	won 1970 U.S. Junior Amateur
Tyler McCumber	–	–	n/a	
Steve Melnyk	–	–	–	won the 1969 U.S. Amateur, 1971 British Amateur
Bob Murphy	5	–	11	won the 1965 U.S. Amateur, 1966 NCAA championship
Andy North	3	–	1	won the 1978 and 1985 U.S. Opens
Rick Pearson	–	3	–	Pearson was a member of the PGA Tour (1982–83, 1988–89)
David Peoples	2	–	–	
Dave Ragan	3	–	–	
Larry Rinker	–	–	–	won 1985 JCPenney Classic and played in 525 PGA Tour events
Doug Sanders	20	–	1	
Dan Sikes	6	–	3	
Brett Stegmaier	–	–	n/a	
Will Strickler	–	–	n/a	
Mike Sullivan	3	–	–	
Camilo Villegas	4	–	n/a	has been ranked in the top 10 of the OWGR

== See also ==
- Florida Gators
- List of Florida Gators women's golfers on the LPGA Tour
- List of University of Florida alumni
- List of University of Florida Athletic Hall of Fame members
