= Karen Davies =

Welsh professional golfer (born 1965)

Personal information
- Full name: Karen Louise Davies
- Nationality: Wales
- Born: 19 June 1965 (age 61) Wrexham, Wales
- Height: 5 ft 7 in (1.70 m)

Career
- Sport: Golf
- College: University of Florida
- Turned professional: 1989
- Former tours: LPGA Tour (1990–2004); Ladies European Tour; Futures Tour

Best results in LPGA major championships
- Chevron Championship: DNP
- Women's PGA C'ship: T61: 1992
- U.S. Women's Open: T42: 1992
- du Maurier Classic: T15: 1991
- Women's British Open: CUT: 2003

Karen Davies (born 19 June 1965) is a professional golfer from Wales who formerly played on the LPGA Tour.

== Early life ==
In 1965, Davies was born in Wrexham, Wales. She gained her first recognition as an amateur golfer when she won the Welsh Girls Championship in 1980 and 1982. She was runner-up in the 1984 Welsh Ladies' Amateur Championship.

== Amateur career ==
Davies attended the University of Florida in Gainesville, Florida, where she played for coach Mimi Ryan's Florida Gators women's golf team in National Collegiate Athletic Association (NCAA) competition from 1985 to 1988. While playing for Florida, she was the individual Southeastern Conference (SEC) champion in 1986, led her Gators team to back-to-back NCAA championships in 1985 and 1986, and set the team record for most collegiate events won with nine. Davies was honored as the SEC Freshman of the Year in 1985, the SEC Player of the Year in 1987, and was a four-time first-team All-SEC selection (1985–1988) and a three-time first-team All-American (1986–1988).

In between college golf seasons, she played on the winning Great Britain and Ireland Curtis Cup teams in 1986 and 1988.

== Professional career ==
In 1990, Davies qualified for the LPGA Tour. Her best results on tour were a trio of sixth-place finishes: at the 1991 Ping-Cellular One LPGA Golf Championship, at the 1992 Itoki Hawaiian Ladies Open, and at the 1996 Sara Lee Classic.

== Awards and honors ==
- In 1985, during her first year at the University of Florida, she earned SEC Freshman of the Year honors.
- In 1987, during her junior year, she earned the SEC Player of the Year honors.
- From 1986 through 1988, Davies earned All-American honors during her final three years at university.
- In 2000, Davies was inducted into the University of Florida Athletic Hall of Fame as a "Gator Great."

== Amateur wins ==
- 1980 Welsh Girls Championship
- 1982 Welsh Girls Championship

== Team appearances ==
Amateur

- Curtis Cup (representing Great Britain & Ireland): 1986 (winners), 1988 (winners)
- Vagliano Trophy (representing Great Britain & Ireland): 1987 (winners)
- European Ladies' Team Championship (representing Wales): 1987
- Commonwealth Trophy (representing Great Britain): 1987

== See also ==
- List of Florida Gators women's golfers on the LPGA Tour
- List of University of Florida alumni
- List of University of Florida Athletic Hall of Fame members
