= Melissa Nawa =

Zambian golfer (born 1991)

Melissa Nawa (born 23 October 1991) is a Zambian professional golfer. She is the first female professional golfer from that country.

== Career ==
At the age of 6, she started playing golf. Nawa has won several tournaments around Africa. Her father and trainer, Stephen Nawa, and younger sister, Tina Nawa, are also professional golfers.

For her secondary school education, Nawa went to Mary Queen of Peace High School in Zambia. Nawa later went to Alabama State University. She currently lives in the United States.

In 2014, Melissa and her sister formed Nawa Girls Golf Academy. The aim of the academy is to teach girls from underprivileged backgrounds the sport of golf.

== Professional wins ==
- 2013 Zambia Open Golf Championship

== Awards and honors ==
In 2003, she won a number of awards at the Lusaka Ladies Open Championship.
