= Flavia Namakula =

Ugandan golfer

Personal information
- Nationality: Uganda
- Born: 10 December 1985 (age 40) Kampala, Uganda

Career
- Sport: Golf
- College: Makerere University
- Turned professional: 2016
- Current tour: Sunshine Ladies Tour (joined 2016)

Flavia Namakula (born 10 December 1985, other sources report 17 December 1986) is a Ugandan golfer.

== Early life and amateur career ==
Namakula was born in Rubaga Hospital to Judith Kamale, a nurse. She attended Saint Balikuddembe, Mitala Maria and Bulo Parents Secondary School in Butambala District as well as Gombe Senior Secondary School. Her first instructor was Deo Akope.

In 2006, she was enrolled for a degree in Information technology at Makerere University.

In 2008, she was the first Ugandan golfer to win the Kenya Ladies Open. In 2010, she is notable for being the youngest winner to-date of the Uganda Women's Golf Tournament, at the age of 25.

== Professional career ==
In 2016, at the age of 30, she turned professional. By 2019, she was a five-time winner of the Uganda Ladies Open.

She currently tours on the Sunshine Ladies Tour.

== Personal life ==
Namakula has one daughter.

== Professional wins (7) ==
- 2006 Rwanda Open
- 2008 Kenya Ladies Open
- 2010 Uganda Ladies Open
- 2011 Uganda Ladies Open
- 2014 Uganda Ladies Open
- 2015 Uganda Ladies Open
- 2016 Uganda Ladies Open
