= Mimi Ryan =

American golf coach (born 1936)

Biographical details
- Born: April 1, 1936 (age 90); Troy, New York, U.S.

Coaching career (HC unless noted)
- 1973–1994: University of Florida

Accomplishments and honors

Championships
- NCAA (1985, 1986); SEC (1981, 1982, 1984, 1986, 1987, 1991)

Awards
- SEC Coach of the Year (1985, 1986); NGCA National Coach of the Year (1986); NGCA National Coaches Hall of Fame; University of Florida Athletic Hall of Fame

Mimi Ryan (born April 1, 1936) is an American former college golf coach. Ryan was the founder and long-time head coach of the Florida Gators women's golf program at the University of Florida. She is best known for leading the Florida Gators women's golfers to two back-to-back National Collegiate Athletic Association (NCAA) national tournament championships.

== Early life and education ==
Ryan was born in Troy, New York in 1936. She was the daughter of John Ryan, an electrician, and his wife Mildred Pratt Ryan, a telephone operator who worked in the New York governor's office.

Ryan graduated from Bouve College in Boston Massachusetts with a bachelor's degree in physical education, then earned a second degree in education from Tufts University in Medford, Massachusetts, and a master's degree in education from the University of North Carolina in Greensboro, North Carolina.

== Coaching career ==
Ryan started her coaching career as the first head coach of the Penn State Nittany Lions women's golf team at Penn State University in State College, Pennsylvania, from 1964 to 1969. In 1969, she was hired to be a physical education instructor by dean Dennis K. Stanley of the College of Health and Human Performance at the University of Florida in Gainesville, Florida. Shortly thereafter, Ryan was also hired to be one of the first generation of Florida Gators women's sports head coaches at the University of Florida.

University of Florida athletic director Ray Graves and associate athletic director Ruth H. Alexander had made the strategic decision to embrace Title IX, the new federal law requiring equal opportunities for women in U.S. college sports. Among the first programs started was the new Lady Gators women's golf program, and Ryan was recruited to start it from scratch—first as an intercollegiate club team in 1969, and then to elevate it as a varsity team in Association for Intercollegiate Athletics for Women (AIAW) competition in 1973. In the Lady Gators' first year as a varsity sports team, Ryan's Gators finished seventh at the AIAW national championship tournament, beginning a streak of nineteen consecutive top-ten finishes in the AIAW and NCAA national championship tournaments.

Ryan's golfers finished second in the AIAW national championship tournament in 1978 and 1979, but the Gators women's golf program peaked in the mid-1980s, when her Lady Gators won back-to-back NCAA national tournament championships in 1985 and 1986. Led by senior Deb Richard, the 1985 Gators dominated the NCAA tournament field to win their first national championship, and Richard missed winning the NCAA individual championship by a single stroke.

For the first time in NCAA history, all five starting members of her 1986 team were recognized as All-Americans, including senior team captain Lisa Stanley, freshmen Cheryl Morley and Lisa Nedoba, junior Page Dunlap, who won the 1986 NCAA individual championship, and sophomore Karen Davies, who won the 1986 SEC individual championship. Following the 1986 NCAA championship, the National Golf Coaches Association (NGCA) honored Ryan with its national coach of the year award and later inducted her into its Coaches Hall of Fame as one of its five "charter members."

Ryan's Lady Gators also won Southeastern Conference (SEC) championships in 1981, 1982, 1984, 1986, 1987 and 1991, and four of her golfers won a total of six SEC individual championships.

In the middle of the 1994 fall season, Ryan decided to retire after twenty-five years as the Lady Gators' head coach, citing her inability to continue to give her coaching responsibilities the full attention that her athletes deserved.

== Life after golf ==
Ryan was inducted into the University of Florida Athletic Hall of Fame as an "Honorary Letter Winner" in 1996. Today, there is an endowed athletic scholarship in her name at the University of Florida. Ryan is retired, lives in Gainesville, and remains in active communication with her former players.

== See also ==
- Buddy Alexander
- Buster Bishop
- Florida Gators
- History of the University of Florida
- List of Florida Gators women's golfers on the LPGA Tour
- List of University of Florida Athletic Hall of Fame members
- University Athletic Association
