= List of Florida Gators women's golfers on the LPGA Tour =

This List of Florida Gators women's golfers on the LPGA Tour includes notable athletes who played for the Florida Gators women's golf team that represents the University of Florida in Gainesville, Florida, and who currently play or have played golf professionally. These alumnae of the University of Florida played on the LPGA Tour or competed in other major LPGA-affiliated tours and tournaments.

Name	LPGA wins	Other wins	Notes
Laura Brown	–	–	Current head golf coach at Daytona State College, 1991 All-American
Jeanne-Marie Busuttil	–	1	1995 & 1996 All-American
Lynn Connelly	–	4	Won 1984 Thailand Open, 3 Futures Tour events in 1983, 12 year LPGA Tour veteran
Karen Davies	–	–	Three-time All-American (1985–1987)
Beverley Davis	–	1	Instructor at LPGA International
Page Dunlap	–	5	1986 Broderick Award recipient
Sandra Gal	1	2	Three-time All-American (2005–2008)
Lori Garbacz	1	–	1978 All-American
Mary Hafeman	–	1	Current director for LPGA International
Lisa Hall	–	6	1997 LPGA Rookie of the Year
Riko Higashio	–	1	Winner of the 1999 SNET Women's Classic
Donna Horton	3	–	Winner of 1976 U.S. Women's Amateur, 15 year LPGA Tour veteran
Paula Martí	–	3	Winner of the 2002 Australian LPGA Tournament of Champions
Deb Richard	5	1	Winner of 1984 U.S. Women's Amateur, 20 year LPGA Tour veteran
Laurie Rinker	2	6	25-year veteran of the LPGA Tour
Nancy Rubin Sharff	–	3	15 year veteran of the LPGA Tour
Naree Song	–	2	Winner of the 2001 Kosaido Thailand Ladies Open
Maria Torres	–	1	Played in 2020 Olympics for Puerto Rico
Michelle Vinieratos	–	3	Winner of the 1998 Capitol Region Futures Classic

== See also ==
- Florida Gators
- List of Florida Gators men's golfers on the PGA Tour
- List of University of Florida alumni
- List of University of Florida Athletic Hall of Fame members
