= Wendy's Championship for Children =

Golf tournament formerly on the LPGA Tour

The Wendy's Championship for Children was an annual golf tournament for professional female golfers on the LPGA Tour from 1999 through 2006 in the Columbus, Ohio area. The tournament was played at the New Albany Country Club in New Albany, Ohio from 1999 to 2001. In 2002, it moved to Tartan Fields Golf Club in Dublin, Ohio.

Proceeds from the event benefited pediatric cancer research and treatment at the Columbus Children's Hospital. From 2000 to 2005, over $2.7 million was raised.

On August 31, 2006, corporate sponsor Wendy's announced that its relationship with the tournament had come to an end as a result of a disagreement between the corporation and the LPGA over future dates of the event.

The last tournament was held August 22–27, 2006.

Tournament names through the years:

- 1999-2000: New Albany Golf Classic
- 2001-2006: Wendy's Championship for Children

== Winners ==
Year	Champion	Country	Score	Tournament Location	Purse	Winner's Share
2006	Lorena Ochoa	Mexico	264 (-24)	Tartan Fields Golf Club	$1,100,000	$165,000
2005	Cristie Kerr	United States	270 (-18)	Tartan Fields Golf Club	$1,100,000	$165,000
2004	Catriona Matthew	Scotland	278 (-10)	Tartan Fields Golf Club	$1,100,000	$165,000
2003	Hee-Won Han	South Korea	199 (-17)	Tartan Fields Golf Club	$1,100,000	$165,000
2002	Mi Hyun Kim	South Korea	208 (-8)	Tartan Fields Golf Club	$1,000,000	$150,000
2001	Wendy Ward	United States	195 (-21)	New Albany Country Club	$1,000,000	$150,000
2000	Lorie Kane	Canada	277 (-11)	New Albany Country Club	$1,000,000	$150,000
1999	Annika Sörenstam	Sweden	269 (-19)	New Albany Country Club	$1,000,000	$150,000

== Tournament record ==
Year	Player	Score	Round	Course
2001	Wendy Ward	62 (-10)	2nd round	New Albany Country Club
