= Jennifer Rosales =

Filipino professional golfer (born 1978)

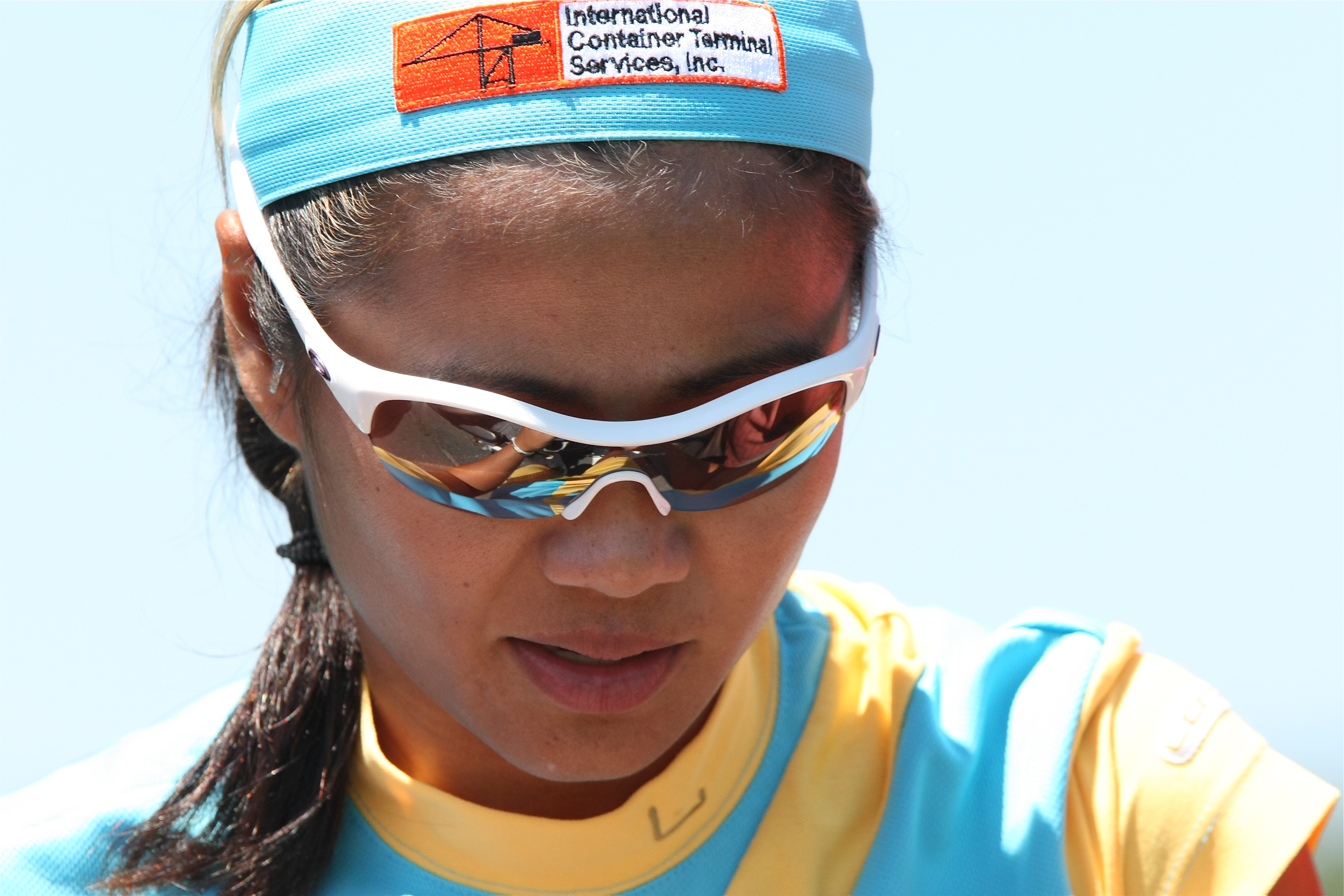
- Rosales at the 2008 LPGA Championship

Personal information
- Nickname: JRo
- Nationality: Philippines
- Born: September 17, 1978 (age 48) Manila, Philippines
- Height: 5 ft 5 in (1.65 m)

Career
- Sport: Golf
- College: University of Southern California
- Turned professional: 2000
- Former tour: LPGA Tour (joined 2000)
- Professional wins: 3

Number of wins by tour
- LPGA Tour: 2
- Other: 1

Best results in LPGA major championships
- Chevron Championship: T9: 2003
- Women's PGA C'ship: T11: 2003
- U.S. Women's Open: 4th: 2004
- du Maurier Classic: CUT: 2000
- Women's British Open: T4: 2002
- Evian Championship: CUT: 2013, 2014
Medal record
Asian Games
Bronze medal – third place	1998 Bangkok	Women's team

Jennifer Rosales OL (born September 17, 1978) is a professional golfer from the Philippines, currently playing on the U.S.-based LPGA Tour.

== Early life and amateur career ==
In 1978, Rosales was born in Manila. She won the Philippine Ladies Amateur Golf Championship five times in a row from 1994 to 1998.

She attended the University of Southern California in Los Angeles and won the 1998 NCAA Championship as a freshman in 1998. Rosales also won the Golf World/Palmetto Dunes Collegiate Invitational, and was named first team All-American for 1998-1999, her sophomore year with the Trojans.

== Professional career ==
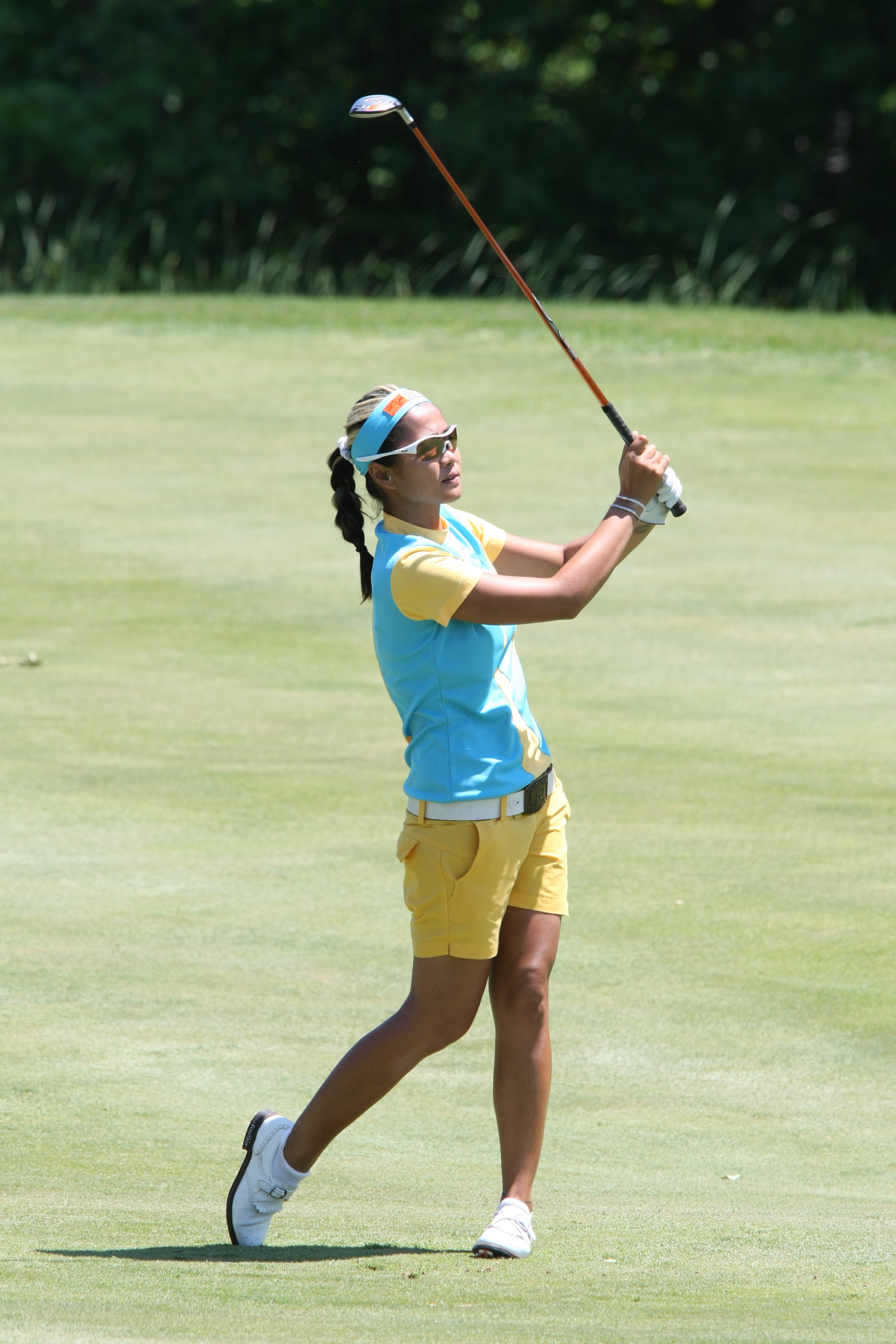
Rosales at the 2008 LPGA Championship.

In 1999, Rosales gained exempt status for the LPGA Tour for the 2000 season by finishing tied for seventh at the LPGA Final Qualifying Tournament. She became the first golfer from the Philippines to win on the LPGA Tour at the Chick-fil-A Charity Championship in 2004. Rosales gained her second win at the first official tournament of the 2005 season, the SBS Open at Turtle Bay in Hawaii.

In 2005, Rosales teamed with Dorothy Delasin to represent the Philippines in the inaugural Women's World Cup of Golf, where they finished second. She played with Ana Larraneta in the 2006 event, and was part of Team Asia at the Lexus Cup in 2005 and 2006. Rosales and Delasin again represented the Philippines in 2008 at the World Cup, and won by two strokes over the team from Korea. The duo birdied the last four holes in the final round for 65 (–7) in the fourball (better ball) format, for a 54-hole total of 198 (–18).

For the 2014 season, Rosales earned full status on the LPGA Tour by finishing 68th on the 2013 money list.

== Professional wins (3) ==
=== LPGA Tour wins (2) ===
No.	Date	Tournament	Winning score	To par	Margin of victory	Runners-up
1	May 2, 2004	Chick-fil-A Charity Championship	70-70-69-65=274	–14	1 stroke	(United States) Rosie Jones (South Korea) Jung Yeon Lee (Wales) Becky Morgan (South Korea) Grace Park
2	Feb 26, 2005	SBS Open at Turtle Bay	66-69-73=208	–8	2 strokes	(United States) Cristie Kerr (United States) Michelle Wie

LPGA Tour playoff record (0–1)

No.	Year	Tournament	Opponents	Result
1	2003	Giant Eagle LPGA Classic	(Canada) Lori Kane (Sweden) Annika Sörenstam (Australia) Rachel Teske	Teske won with birdie on third extra hole

=== Other wins (1) ===
- 2008 (1) Women's World Cup of Golf (with Dorothy Delasin)

== Team appearances ==
Amateur

- Espirito Santo Trophy (representing the Philippines): 1996, 1998

Professional

- Lexus Cup (representing Asia team): 2005, 2006 (winners)
- World Cup (representing the Philippines): 2005, 2008 (winners)
