= Eva Magala =

Ugandan golfer (born 1974)

Eva Magala (born 17 January 1974) is a Ugandan amateur golfer who is the current chairperson of the Uganda Ladies Golf Union as well as elected trustee for the East & Central Africa region for the All Africa Challenge Trophy (AACT).

== Golfing career ==
Magala was introduced to golf by her late husband and started playing in 1996. As a player, she plays under Uganda Golf Club and has represented Uganda as captain of the national Ladies' Team in 2015.

Administratively, she serves as the chairperson of the Uganda Ladies Golf Union.

She has called on the government to revise the current education system in order for more attention to be paid to sports.

== Tournament wins ==
| Year | Tournament |
|---|---|
| 2018 | Nigeria Ladies Open |
| 2018 | 21st JBG Golf Open |
| 2019 | IBB Ladies Golf Championship |

== Awards and recognition ==
- 2018 - Uganda Sports Press Associations (USPA) Female Golfer of the year
