= Park Hee-jung (golfer) =

South Korean professional golfer (born 1980)

Hee-Jung Park 박희정
Personal information
- Nicknames: Gloria, Koala
- Nationality: South Korea
- Born: 27 February 1980 (age 46) Seoul, South Korea
- Height: 5 ft 7 in (1.70 m)
- Spouse: Hee-Taek Chang

Career
- Sport: Golf
- Turned professional: 1998
- Former tour: LPGA Tour
- Professional wins: 4

Number of wins by tour
- LPGA Tour: 2
- LPGA of Korea Tour: 1
- Other: 1

Best results in LPGA major championships
- Chevron Championship: T32: 2002
- Women's PGA C'ship: T4: 2004
- U.S. Women's Open: T20: 2006
- du Maurier Classic: T60: 2000
- Women's British Open: T10: 2003

Hee-Jung "Gloria" Park (born 27 February 1980) is a South Korean professional golfer. She has played mostly on U.S.-based LPGA Tour. She has also used the Westernized name Gloria Park.

== Career ==
In 1980, Park was born in Seoul, South Korea. After moving to Australia as a teenager, she won the Australian Girls' Amateur three times and won the Australian Women's Amateur Stroke Play Championship in 1997.

After turning professional in 1998, Park won the 1998 Sports Seoul Ladies' Open on the LPGA of Korea Tour and the 1999 Indonesian Ladies' Open. She finished 13th at the 1999 LPGA Final Qualifying Tournament to earn a place on the U.S.-based LPGA Tour for the 2000 season. On the LPGA Tour, she has won the 2001 Williams Championship and the 2002 Sybase Big Apple Classic.2003 LPGA Championship

== Professional wins (4) ==
=== LPGA Tour wins (2) ===
No.	Date	Tournament	Winning score	Margin of victory	Runner-up
1	9 Sep 2001	Williams Championship	−9 (68-69-64=201)	1 stroke	(United States) Donna Andrews
2	28 Jul 2002	Sybase Big Apple Classic	−14 (71-67-63-69=270)	Playoff	(South Korea) Hee-Won Han

LPGA Tour playoff record (1–1)

No.	Year	Tournament	Opponent	Result
1	2002	Sybase Big Apple Classic	(South Korea) Hee-Won Han	Won with birdie on first extra hole
2	2005	Jamie Farr Owens Corning Classic	(United States) Heather Bowie	Lost to par on third extra hole

=== LPGA of Korea Tour wins (1) ===
- 1998 Sports Seoul Ladies' Open

=== Other wins (1) ===
- 1999 Indonesia Ladies Open

== Results in LPGA majors ==
Tournament	2000
Kraft Nabisco Championship	
LPGA Championship	T28
U.S. Women's Open	CUT
du Maurier Classic	T60

Tournament	2001	2002	2003	2004	2005	2006	2007	2008
Kraft Nabisco Championship		T32	T42	CUT	T44	CUT	T46	CUT
LPGA Championship	T43	T23	CUT	T4	T7	T61	T46	T40
U.S. Women's Open		T44	CUT	T37	T23	T20	CUT	
Women's British Open	T25	CUT	T10	T31	CUT	CUT	T16	T48

Top 10
Did not play

CUT = missed the half-way cut
WD = withdrew
"T" = tied

=== Summary ===
- Starts – 32
- Wins – 0
- 2nd-place finishes – 0
- 3rd-place finishes – 0
- Top 3 finishes – 0
- Top 5 finishes – 1
- Top 10 finishes – 3
- Top 25 finishes – 8
- Missed cuts – 10
- Most consecutive cuts made – 6 (twice)
- Longest streak of top-10s – 1

== Team appearances ==
Amateur

- Tasman Cup (representing Australia): 1997 (winners)

Professional

- Lexus Cup (representing Asia team): 2005
