= Kim Ran-kyung =

South Korean golfer (born 1992)

Kim Ran-kyung (born 16 December 1992) is a South Korean professional golfer who played on the LPGA of Korea Tour.
