= Naree Song =

South Korean professional golfer (born 1986)

Naree Song 송나리
Personal information
- Nationality: South Korea; Thailand
- Born: 1 May 1986 (age 40) Bangkok, Thailand
- Height: 5 ft 4.5 in (1.64 m)

Career
- Sport: Golf
- College: University of Florida; Sung Kyun Kwan University
- Turned professional: 2004
- Former tours: LPGA Tour; Futures Tour
- Professional wins: 2

Number of wins by tour
- Ladies Asian Golf Tour: 1
- Epson Tour: 1

Best results in LPGA major championships
- Chevron Championship: T58: 2001, 2002
- Women's PGA C'ship: DNP
- U.S. Women's Open: T40: 2000
- Women's British Open: DNP

Naree Song (Korean: 송나리, (born Naree Wongluekiet 1 May 1986) is a Korean professional golfer of Thai descent.

== Early life and amateur career ==
Song's birth name was Naree Wongluekiet, and she and her identical twin sister were born in Bangkok, Thailand. Her father is South Korean and her mother is Thai. She is a South Korean citizen, and has represented Thailand in junior team competition, but she has spent much of her life in the United States. Her hometown in the United States was Bradenton, Florida.

In 1999, Song was awarded the American Junior Golf Association All-American award. She competed in the U.S. Women's Open as an amateur in 2000 and she finished fortieth overall. In 2001, Song won the Kosaido Thailand Ladies Open. In 2002, she won the South Atlantic Ladies Amateur.

Song attended the University of Florida in Gainesville, Florida. She played for the Florida Gators women's golf team in 2003.

== Professional career ==
In 2004, Song turned professional. She has played on both the Futures Tour and the LPGA Tour.

== Personal life ==
Song is the identical twin of Aree Song, who is also an LPGA Tour golfer.

== Amateur wins ==
- 2002 South Atlantic Ladies Amateur

== Professional wins (2) ==
=== Ladies Asian Golf Tour wins (1) ===
- 2001 Kosaido Thailand Ladies Open (as an amateur)

=== Futures Tour wins (1) ===
- 2004 New Innsbrook Country Club Futures Golf Classic

== See also ==
- List of Florida Gators women's golfers on the LPGA Tour

== Team appearances ==
Amateur

- Espirito Santo Trophy (representing Thailand): 2002

Professional

- Lexus Cup (representing Asia team): 2005
