= Kim Saiki =

American professional golfer (born 1966)

Kim Saiki-Maloney
Personal information
- Nationality: United States
- Born: January 24, 1966 (age 60) Inglewood, California, U.S.
- Height: 5 ft 4 in (1.63 m)

Career
- Sport: Golf
- College: University of Southern California
- Turned professional: 1989
- Former tours: LPGA Tour (1992–2007); Futures Tour
- Professional wins: 8

Number of wins by tour
- LPGA Tour: 1
- Epson Tour: 2

Best results in LPGA major championships
- Chevron Championship: T8: 2000
- Women's PGA C'ship: T12: 2002
- U.S. Women's Open: T20: 2004
- du Maurier Classic: T16: 1997
- Women's British Open: T42: 2005

Kim Saiki-Maloney (born January 24, 1966) is a Japanese-American professional golfer who played on the LPGA Tour from 1992 to 2007.

== Early life and amateur career ==
In 1966, Saiki was born in Inglewood, California. She won the 1983 U.S. Girls' Junior.

Saiki was a college All-America at the University of Southern California in 1986. In 1988, she graduated with a degree in Public Administration.

== Professional career ==
In 1989, Saiki turned professional.

Saiki played on several tours before joining the LPGA Tour: Players West Golf Tour in 1989 (winning five times), Futures Tour in 1990 (winning twice), Women Professional Golfers' European Tour in 1991, and the Ladies Asian Tour in 1991.

Siaki played over a decade on the LPGA Tour before winning the 2004 Wegmans Rochester LPGA. She competed under the name Kim Saiki-Maloney after marrying in 2006.

== Professional wins (8) ==
=== LPGA Tour wins (1) ===
No.	Date	Tournament	Winning score	Margin of victory	Runners-up
1	Jun 27, 2004	Wegmans Rochester LPGA	14 (66-69-68-71=274)	4 strokes	(United States) Rosie Jones (South Korea) Mi-Hyun Kim

=== Futures Tour wins (2) ===
- 1990 Futures Mid Florida Competition, Pinseeker Futures Golf Classic

=== Players West Golf Tour wins (5) ===
- 1989 five wins
