= Riko Higashio =

Japanese professional golfer (born 1975)

Riko Higashio 東尾理子
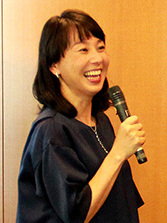
- 2016

Personal information
- Nationality: Japan
- Born: 18 November 1975 (age 50) Fukuoka, Fukuoka Prefecture, Japan
- Height: 1.60 m (5 ft 3 in)
- Spouse: Junichi Ishida

Career
- Sport: Golf
- College: Nihon University; University of Florida
- Turned professional: 1998
- Current tour: LPGA of Japan Tour (joined 1999)
- Former tours: LPGA Tour (2004-2007); Futures Tour (1999-2000)
- Professional wins: 1

Number of wins by tour
- Epson Tour: 1

Best results in LPGA major championships
- Chevron Championship: DNP
- Women's PGA C'ship: CUT: 2004, 2005
- U.S. Women's Open: CUT: 1996, 2005
- Women's British Open: T42: 2005

Riko Higashio (東尾 理子, Higashio Riko; born 18 November 1975) is a Japanese professional golfer and former member of the LPGA Tour.

== Amateur career ==
Higashio was born in Fukuoka Prefecture, Japan. As a teenager, she won the 1993 Japan Amateur Championship and the 1994 Japan Junior Championship.

Higashio first attended Nihon University in Tokyo. She accepted an athletic scholarship to attend the University of Florida in Gainesville, Florida, United States, where she played for the Florida Gators women's golf team in National Collegiate Athletic Association (NCAA) competition from 1996 to 1998. Higashio won four tournaments as a college golfer. She was recognized as the Southeastern Conference (SEC) Freshman of the Year in 1996, and was a first-team All-SEC selection in 1996, 1997 and 1998, an honorable mention All-American in 1996, and a first-team All-American in 1998. She was also honored as a member of the National Golf Coaches Association All-American Scholar Team and graduated from the University of Florida with a bachelor's degree in psychology in 1998. Higashio will be inducted into the University of Florida Athletic Hall of Fame as a "Gator Great" in 2013.

== Professional career ==
Higashio turned professional in 1998. She joined the LPGA of Japan Tour and the Futures Tour in 1999, and that year she won the SNET Women's Classic on the Futures Tour. Higashio officially joined the LPGA Tour in 2004, and placed thirteenth overall at the Sybase Classic later that year. She placed tenth in the MasterCard Classic in 2005. Higashio suffered a shoulder injury leading to surgery in 2006, and last played on the LPGA Tour in 2007. Her career earnings as a professional golfer totaled over $180,000.

== Family ==
Higashio is the daughter of Osamu Higashio, a member of the Japanese Baseball Hall of Fame and a former pitcher and manager of the Seibu Lions baseball team. She is married to Japanese actor Junichi Ishida.

== Futures Tour wins ==
- 1999 SNET Women's Classic

== Team appearances ==
Amateur

- Espirito Santo Trophy (representing Japan): 1994

Professional

- Lexus Cup (representing Asia team): 2005

== See also ==
- List of Florida Gators women's golfers on the LPGA Tour
- List of University of Florida alumni
- List of University of Florida Athletic Hall of Fame members
