= Han Hee-won =

South Korean professional golfer (born 1978)

Han Hee-won 한희원
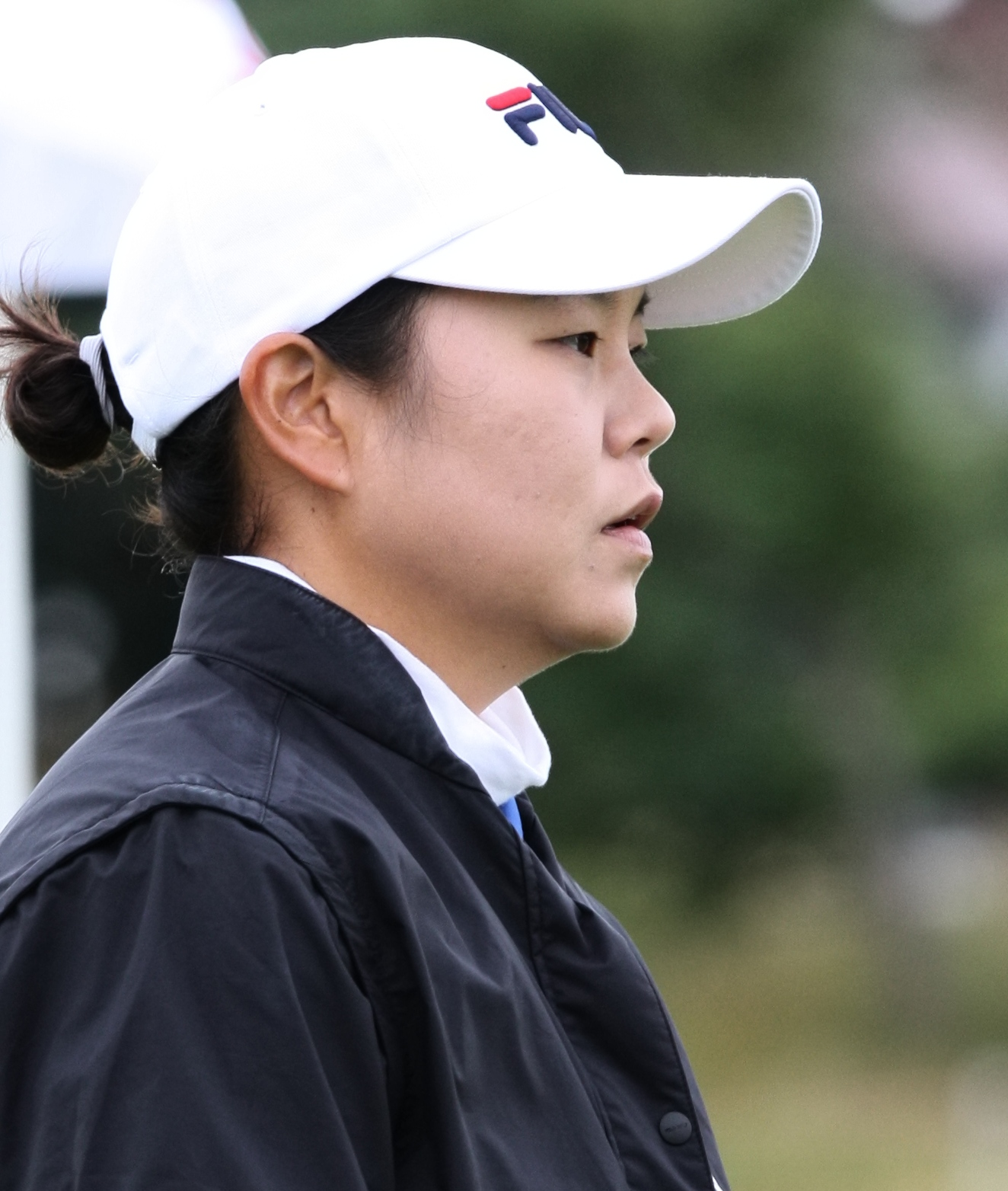
- Han before 2009 Women's British Open

Personal information
- Nationality: South Korea
- Born: 10 June 1978 (age 48) Seoul, South Korea
- Height: 5 ft 7 in (1.70 m)

Career
- Sport: Golf
- College: Ryukoku University
- Turned professional: 1998
- Former tour: LPGA Tour (joined 2001)
- Professional wins: 8

Number of wins by tour
- LPGA Tour: 6
- LPGA of Japan Tour: 2

Best results in LPGA major championships
- Chevron Championship: T6: 2006, 2008
- Women's PGA C'ship: T11: 2003
- U.S. Women's Open: T32: 2002
- Women's British Open: T3: 2009
- Evian Championship: T31: 2013

Achievements and awards
- JLPGA Rookie of the Year: 1998
- LPGA Rookie of the Year: 2001
Medal record
Asian Games
| Silver medal – second place | 1994 Hiroshima | Women's team |

Han Hee-won (Korean: 한희원; born 10 June 1978) is a retired South Korean professional golfer on the LPGA Tour. She was a member of the LPGA Tour from 2001 until her retirement in 2014 and won six LPGA Tour events during her career. She attended Ryukoku University and turned professional in 1998.

In 1998 she competed on the LPGA of Korea Tour and the LPGA of Japan Tour, claiming Rookie of the Year honours in Japan. In 1999 she won twice in Japan. She qualified for the U.S.-based LPGA Tour at the 2000 Qualifying School and has played mainly in the United States since 2001. She was Rookie of the Year in her first season.

Han played in only seven events during 2007 due to the birth of her son, Dae-Il "Dale".

Han retired from the LPGA Tour at the 2014 Portland Classic.

== Professional wins (8) ==
=== LPGA Tour wins (6) ===
| No. | Date | Tournament | Winning score | Margin of victory | Runner-up |
|---|---|---|---|---|---|
| 1 | 20 Jul 2003 | Sybase Big Apple Classic | –11 (68-66-68-71=273) | 2 strokes | (United States) Meg Mallon |
| 2 | 10 Aug 2003 | Wendy's Championship for Children | –17 (68-65-66=199) | Playoff | (United States) Wendy Ward |
| 3 | 19 Sep 2004 | Safeway Classic | –9 (69-71-67=207) | Playoff | (Canada) Lorie Kane |
| 4 | 3 Oct 2005 | Office Depot Championship | –12 (65-68-68=201) | 2 strokes | (South Korea) Kang Soo-yun |
| 5 | 28 May 2006 | LPGA Corning Classic | –15 (66-70-69-68=273) | Playoff | (South Korea) Meena Lee |
| 6 | 22 Oct 2006 | Honda LPGA Thailand | –14 (67-68-67=202) | 5 strokes | (United States) Diana D'Alessio |

LPGA Tour playoff record (3–3)

| No. | Year | Tournament | Opponent | Result |
|---|---|---|---|---|
| 1 | 2002 | Sybase Big Apple Classic | (South Korea) Gloria Park | Lost to birdie on first extra hole |
| 2 | 2003 | Wendy's Championship for Children | (United States) Wendy Ward | Won with birdie on third extra hole |
| 3 | 2003 | Mobile LPGA Tournament of Champions | (United States) Dorothy Delasin | Lost to birdie on first extra hole |
| 4 | 2004 | Wendy's Championship for Children | (Scotland) Catriona Matthew | Lost to par on first extra hole |
| 5 | 2004 | Safeway Classic | (Canada) Lorie Kane | Won with birdie on first extra hole |
| 6 | 2006 | LPGA Corning Classic | (South Korea) Meena Lee | Won with par on fourth extra hole |

=== LPGA of Japan wins (2) ===
- 1999 (2) NEC Kairuzawa Tournament, Osaka Women's Open

== Results in LPGA majors ==
Results not in chronological order before 2014.

| Tournament | 2001 | 2002 | 2003 | 2004 | 2005 | 2006 | 2007 | 2008 | 2009 |
|---|---|---|---|---|---|---|---|---|---|
| Kraft Nabisco Championship | | T25 | 20 | T13 | T17 | T6 | T49 | T6 | T28 |
| LPGA Championship | T37 | T57 | T11 | T49 | T25 | T25 | | T40 | T21 |
| U.S. Women's Open | | T32 | T43 | T52 | T47 | CUT | | T71 | CUT |
| Women's British Open | T32 | | T19 | T13 | CUT | T10 | | T9 | T3 |

| Tournament | 2010 | 2011 | 2012 | 2013 | 2014 |
|---|---|---|---|---|---|
| Kraft Nabisco Championship | T34 | CUT | T49 | 62 | T67 |
| U.S. Women's Open | CUT | CUT | CUT | CUT | |
| Women's British Open | CUT | T43 | T39 | | |
| LPGA Championship | T47 | T25 | T45 | WD | CUT |
| The Evian Championship ^ | | | | T31 | |

^ The Evian Championship was added as a major in 2013.

Top 10
Did not play

CUT = missed the half-way cut
WD = withdrew
"T" = tied for place

=== Summary ===
| Tournament | Wins | 2nd | 3rd | Top-5 | Top-10 | Top-25 | Events | Cuts made |
|---|---|---|---|---|---|---|---|---|
| Kraft Nabisco Championship | 0 | 0 | 0 | 0 | 2 | 6 | 13 | 12 |
| U.S. Women's Open | 0 | 0 | 0 | 0 | 0 | 0 | 11 | 5 |
| Women's British Open | 0 | 0 | 1 | 1 | 3 | 5 | 10 | 8 |
| LPGA Championship | 0 | 0 | 0 | 0 | 0 | 5 | 13 | 11 |
| The Evian Championship | 0 | 0 | 0 | 0 | 0 | 0 | 1 | 1 |
| Totals | 0 | 0 | 1 | 1 | 5 | 16 | 48 | 37 |

- Most consecutive cuts made – 16 (2001 LPGA – 2005 U.S. Open)
- Longest streak of top-10s – 1 (five times)

== Team appearances ==
Amateur

- Espirito Santo Trophy (representing South Korea): 1996 (winners)

Professional

- Lexus Cup (representing Asia team): 2005, 2006 (winners)
