= Aree Song =

South Korean professional golfer (born 1986)

Aree Song 송아리
Personal information
- Nationality: South Korea; Thailand
- Born: 1 May 1986 (age 40) Bangkok, Thailand
- Height: 5 ft 3 in (1.60 m)

Career
- Sport: Golf
- College: Sung Kyun Kwan University
- Turned professional: 2003
- Former tour: LPGA Tour (joined 2004)

Best results in LPGA major championships
- Chevron Championship: 2nd: 2004
- Women's PGA C'ship: T30: 2004
- U.S. Women's Open: 5th: 2003
- Women's British Open: T23: 2004

Aree Song (Korean: 송아리), (born Aree Wongluekiet 1 May 1986) is a Korean professional golfer. She played on the LPGA Tour. She is a South Korean citizen, and has represented Thailand in junior team competition, but she has spent much of her life in the United States.

== Early life and amateur career ==
Song was born on 1 May 1986, in Bangkok, Thailand. Her father is South Korean and her mother is Thai. She has a twin sister, Naree Song (송나리) who has also been a member of the LPGA Tour.

Song was a child prodigy, setting a number of "youngest" age records. She won the 1999 U.S. Girls' Junior Championship (held at Green Spring Valley Hunt Club in Owings Mills, Maryland) at thirteen years old, becoming the youngest player to win any United States Golf Association championship. In 2000, she tied for 10th place in the Kraft Nabisco Championship, at the age of thirteen. The same year, a few months after her fourteenth birthday, she became the youngest ever semi-finalist at the U.S. Women's Amateur.

In 2001, she was the recipient of the Nancy Lopez Award, which is presented to the best female amateur golfer of the year. The next year she placed first individually at the World Amateur Team Championships (Espirito Santo Trophy) and helped Thailand to a second-place finish. She won a number of adult amateur events in 2002 and 2003 and in the latter year she placed fifth at the U.S. Women's Open.

== Professional career ==
In August 2003, Song turned professional at the age of 17 and 3 months. She was granted an exemption from the LPGA's minimum age rule to allow her to enter the 2003 LPGA Final Qualifying Tournament where she finished fifth to earn membership on the LPGA Tour for 2004. In her rookie season, she finished second at the Kraft Nabisco Championship and ended the year 28th on the money list. Song eagled the 72nd hole at the Kraft Nabisco to tie for the lead but lost by one shot when Grace Park birdied the final hole.

In 2007, Song suffered a lack of energy and continued to struggle, dropping to 88th place on the official LPGA money list. She sat out all of 2008 due to health problems including severe irritable bowel syndrome and adrenal insufficiency.

Song returned to the LPGA Tour in 2009 and was on the leaderboard at the LPGA Championship in June before a final-round 78 pushed her back in the pack. In 2010, she again competed in the LPGA Qualifying Tournament (Q-School) to attempt to regain her playing privileges on the LPGA Tour. She won the tournament and gained full membership on the LPGA Tour for 2011.

== Team appearances ==
Amateur

- Espirito Santo Trophy (representing Thailand): 2002

Professional

- Lexus Cup (representing Asia team): 2005
