= Moira Dunn =

American professional golfer (born 1971)

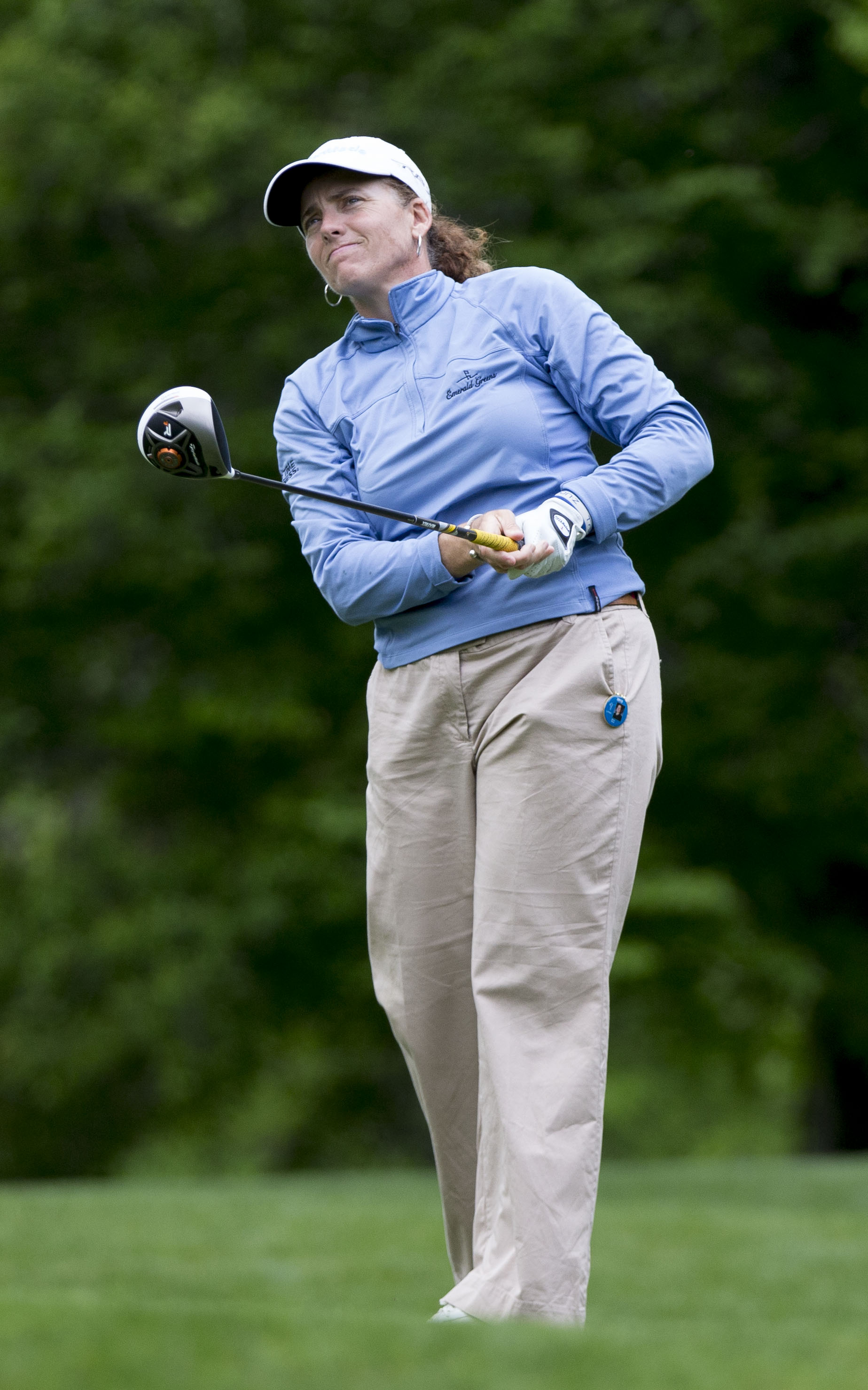

Personal information
- Full name: Moira C. Dunn
- Nationality: United States
- Born: August 3, 1971 (age 55) Utica, New York, U.S.
- Height: 5 ft 7 in (1.70 m)

Career
- Sport: Golf
- College: Florida International University
- Turned professional: 1994
- Former tour: LPGA Tour (joined 1995)
- Professional wins: 1

Number of wins by tour
- LPGA Tour: 1

Best results in LPGA major championships
- Chevron Championship: 19th: 2007
- Women's PGA C'ship: T7: 2005
- U.S. Women's Open: T7: 2004
- du Maurier Classic: T71: 1998
- Women's British Open: T24: 2003
- Evian Championship: CUT: 2013

Moira C. Dunn (born August 3, 1971) is an American professional golfer who played on the LPGA Tour.

== Career ==
Dunn has won once on the LPGA Tour in 2004.

== Amateur wins ==
- 1989 New York State Junior Girls
- 1992 New York State Women's Amateur, Women's Western Amateur
- 1993 New York State Women's Amateur
- 1994 New York State Women's Amateur

== Professional wins (1) ==
=== LPGA Tour wins (1) ===
No.	Date	Tournament	Winning score	Margin of Victory	Runner-up
1	Jul 18, 2004	Giant Eagle LPGA Classic	-12 (70-69-65=204)	2 strokes	(South Korea) Young-A Yang
