= Nebraska Cornhuskers women's golf =

University of Nebraska–Lincoln women's golf team

- Founded: 1975; 51 years ago
- University: University of Nebraska–Lincoln
- Conference: Big Ten
- Athletic director: Troy Dannen
- Head coach: Breanne Hall (2nd season)
- Location: Lincoln, Nebraska
- Course: Firethorn Golf Course; Par: 71; Yards: 7102
- Nickname: Cornhuskers
- Colors: Scarlet and cream

NCAA Championship appearances
- 2000, 2003, 2006

NCAA regional appearances
- 1994, 1995, 1996, 1997, 2000, 2001, 2002, 2003, 2006, 2007, 2008, 2021, 2023

Conference champions
- 1976, 1983

Individual conference champions
- 1996, 2003, 2021

The Nebraska Cornhuskers women's golf team competes as part of NCAA Division I, representing the University of Nebraska–Lincoln in the Big Ten Conference. Nebraska primarily uses Firethorn Golf Course as its home course, but also lists Hillcrest Country Club, ArborLinks Golf Course, Country Club of Lincoln, Highlands Golf Club, and Indian Creek Golf Club as affiliates. The team has been coached by Breanne Hall since 2025.

The program was established in 1975 and has played in fourteen NCAA regionals, advancing to the NCAA Division I championship three times. Nebraska has had twenty golfers named first-team all-conference selections.

== Conference affiliations ==
- Big Eight Conference (1975–1996)
- Big 12 Conference (1996–2011)
- Big Ten Conference (2011–present)

== Coaches ==
=== Coaching history ===
No.	Coach	Tenure
1	Larry Romjue	1975–1979
2	Jerry Fisher	1979–1987
3	Robin Krapfl	1987–2019
4	Lisa Johnson	2019–2022
5	Jeanne Sutherland	2022–2025
6	Breanne Hall	2025–present

=== Coaching staff ===
Name	Position	First year	Alma mater
Breanne Hall	Head coach	2025	Toledo
Halley Morell	Assistant coach	2026	Penn State

== Championships and awards ==
=== Team conference championships ===
- Big Eight: 1976, 1983

=== Individual awards ===
- Edith Cummings Munson Golf Award: Joanne Brooks (1990)
- Arnold Palmer Cup: Kate Smith (2001)
- Conference golfer of the year: Sarah Sasse (2003), Kate Smith (2021)
- Mary Fossum Award: Kate Smith (2020)

=== Conference champions ===
- Big Eight: Rachelle Tacha (1996)
- Big 12: Sarah Sasse (2003)
- Big Ten: Kate Smith (2021)

=== First-team All-Americans ===
- Sarah Sasse – 2003

== Seasons ==
Tournament champion

Year	Coach	Conference	Postseason (Note: The AIAW ran the premier women's collegiate golf championship until the first NCAA Division I championship was held in 1982.)
Big Eight Conference (1976–1996)
1975–76	Larry Romjue	1st	AIAW 22nd
1976–77	Larry Romjue	4th	
1977–78	Larry Romjue	5th	
1978–79	Larry Romjue	4th	
1979–80	Jerry Fisher	5th	
1980–81	Jerry Fisher	4th	
1981–82	Jerry Fisher	4th	
1982–83	Jerry Fisher	1st	
1983–84	Jerry Fisher	2nd	
1984–85	Jerry Fisher	T–5th	
1985–86	Jerry Fisher	3rd	
1986–87	Jerry Fisher	T–5th	
1987–88	Robin Krapfl	5th	
1988–89	Robin Krapfl	4th	
1989–90	Robin Krapfl	5th	
1990–91	Robin Krapfl	3rd	
1991–92	Robin Krapfl	7th	
1992–93	Robin Krapfl	4th	
1993–94	Robin Krapfl	4th	NCAA regional
1994–95	Robin Krapfl	3rd	NCAA regional
1995–96	Robin Krapfl	T–3rd	NCAA Division I regional
Big 12 Conference (1996–2011)
1996–97	Robin Krapfl	3rd	NCAA Division I regional
1997–98	Robin Krapfl	6th	
1998–99	Robin Krapfl	8th	
1999–00	Robin Krapfl	3rd	NCAA Division I 19th
2000–01	Robin Krapfl	5th	NCAA Division I regional
2001–02	Robin Krapfl	7th	NCAA Division I regional
2002–03	Robin Krapfl	5th	NCAA Division I 22nd
2003–04	Robin Krapfl	10th	
2004–05	Robin Krapfl	7th	
2005–06	Robin Krapfl	T–4th	NCAA Division I 20th
2006–07	Robin Krapfl	4th	NCAA Division I regional
2007–08	Robin Krapfl	6th	NCAA Division I regional
2008–09	Robin Krapfl	10th	
2009–10	Robin Krapfl	8th	
2010–11	Robin Krapfl	10th	
Big Ten Conference (2011–present)
2011–12	Robin Krapfl	6th	
2012–13	Robin Krapfl	11th	
2013–14	Robin Krapfl	10th	
2014–15	Robin Krapfl	13th	
2015–16	Robin Krapfl	13th	
2016–17	Robin Krapfl	12th	
2017–18	Robin Krapfl	13th	
2018–19	Robin Krapfl	13th	
2019–20	Lisa Johnson	Canceled (Note: Canceled due to the COVID-19 pandemic.)	
2020–21	Lisa Johnson	T–2nd	NCAA Division I regional
2021–22	Lisa Johnson	7th	
2022–23	Jeanne Sutherland	10th	NCAA Division I regional
2023–24	Jeanne Sutherland	10th	
2024–25	Jeanne Sutherland	18th	
2025–26	Breanne Hall	17th	
