= 2004 NCAA Division I women's golf championship =

2004 NCAA Division I Women's Golf Championship
Tournament information
- Location: Auburn, Alabama, U.S. 32.633176°N 85.506071°W
- Course: Auburn Golf Club

Statistics
- Par: 72 (288)
- Field: 24 teams

Champion
- Team: UCLA (2nd title); Individual: Sarah Huarte, California
- Team: 1,148 (+3); Individual: 278 (−10)

Location map
- Location in the United States Location in Alabama

The 2004 NCAA Division I Women's Golf Championships were contested at the 23rd annual NCAA-sanctioned golf tournament to determine the individual and team national champions of women's Division I collegiate golf in the United States.

The tournament was held at the Auburn Golf Course in Auburn, Alabama.

UCLA won the team championship, the Bruins' second and first since 1991.

Sarah Huarte, from California, won the individual title.

== Individual results ==
=== Individual champion ===
- Sarah Huarte, California (278, −10)

== Team leaderboard ==
| Rank | Team | Score |
|---|---|---|
| 1 | UCLA | 1,148 |
| 2 | Oklahoma State | 1,151 |
| 3 | Duke | 1,159 |
| 4 | California | 1,172 |
| 5 | Vanderbilt | 1,180 |
| T6 | Texas | 1,184 |
| T6 | Washington | 1,184 |
| 8 | Ohio State | 1,187 |
| 9 | Georgia | 1,190 |
| 10 | Arizona State | 1,191 |
| 11 | Tennessee | 1,193 |
| T12 | USC (DC) | 1,195 |
| T12 | Stanford | 1,195 |
| 14 | Wake Forest | 1,234 |
| T15 | Arizona | 1,197 |
| T15 | Furman | 1,197 |
| T15 | New Mexico | 1,197 |
| T15 | North Carolina | 1,197 |
| T19 | Baylor | 1,198 |
| T19 | Florida State | 1,198 |
| 21 | UNLV | 1,204 |
| 22 | Purdue | 1,205 |
| 23 | Texas A&M | 1,211 |
| 24 | Michigan State | 1,215 |

- DC = Defending champion
- Debut appearance
