= 1988 NCAA women's golf championship =

1988 NCAA Women's Golf Championship
Tournament information
- Location: Las Cruces, New Mexico, U.S. 32.286°N 106.731°W
- Course: NMSU Golf Course

Statistics
- Par: 74
- Field: 17 teams

Champion
- Team: ~~Tulsa~~; Individual: ~~Melissa McNamara, Tulsa~~
- Team: 1,175 (−9); Individual: 287 (−9)

Location map
- Location in the United States Location in New Mexico

The 1988 NCAA Women's Golf Championships were contested at the seventh annual NCAA-sanctioned golf tournament to determine the individual and team national champions of women's collegiate golf in the United States. Until 1996, the NCAA would hold just one annual women's golf championship for all programs across Division I, Division II, and Division III.

The tournament was held at the New Mexico State University Golf Course in Las Cruces, New Mexico.

Tulsa won the team championship, but the Golden Hurricane's title was later vacated by the NCAA due to rules violations by the track and field team. Arizona State and Georgia remained tied for second place.

Melissa McNamara, from Tulsa, won the individual title but likewise had her title subsequently vacated.

== Individual results ==
=== Individual champion ===
- ~~Melissa McNamara, Tulsa~~ (287, −9)

== Team results ==
Rank	Team	Score
1	~~Tulsa~~	~~1,175~~
T2	Arizona State	1,182
T2	Georgia	1,182
4	Florida	1,184
5	Duke	1,186
6	San José State (DC)	1,187
7	Texas	1,189
8	Arizona	1,191
9	Miami (FL)	1,198
T10	Kentucky	1,200
T10	New Mexico State	1,200
12	Oklahoma State	1,205
13	UCLA	1,208
14	New Mexico	1,222
15	U.S. International	1,226
16	USC	1,230
17	Ohio State	1,235

- DC = Defending champion
- Debut appearance
