= 1990 NCAA women's golf championship =

1990 NCAA Women's Golf Championship
Tournament information
- Location: Blythewood, South Carolina, U.S. 34.224127°N 80.995950°W
- Course: Cobblestone Park Golf Course

Statistics
- Par: 72 (288)
- Field: 17 teams

Champion
- Team: Arizona State (1st title); Individual: Susan Slaughter, Arizona
- Team: 1,206 (+54); Individual: 297 (+9)
- Location in the United States Location in South Carolina

The 1990 NCAA Women's Golf Championships were contested at the ninth annual NCAA-sanctioned golf tournament to determine the individual and team national champions of women's collegiate golf in the United States. Until 1996, the NCAA would hold just one annual women's golf championship for all programs across Division I, Division II, and Division III.

The tournament was held at the Cobblestone Park Golf Course in Blythewood, South Carolina, a suburb of Columbia.

Arizona State won the team championship, the Sun Devils' first.

Susan Slaughter, from Arizona, won the individual title.

== Individual results ==
=== Individual champion ===
- Susan Slaughter, Arizona (297, +9)

== Team results ==
Rank	Team	Score
1	Arizona State	1,206
2	UCLA	1,222
3	Florida	1,223
4	San José State (DC)	1,225
T5	Texas	1,227
T5	Tulsa	1,227
7	Arizona	1,228
8	Auburn	1,229
9	Stanford	1,239
10	South Florida	1,247
11	Indiana	1,253
12	USC	1,256
13	Kentucky	1,261
14	Kansas	1,270
15	Furman	1,274
16	Oklahoma State	1,277
17	Georgia	1,284

- DC = Defending champion
- Debut appearance
