= 2005 LPGA Tour =

Golf tour season

2005 LPGA Tour season
- Duration: February 11, 2005 – December 18, 2005
- Number of official events: 35
- Most wins: 10 (Sweden) Annika Sörenstam
- Money leader: (Sweden) Annika Sörenstam
- Rolex Player of the Year: (Sweden) Annika Sörenstam
- Vare Trophy: (Sweden) Annika Sörenstam
- Rookie of the Year: (United States) Paula Creamer

The 2005 LPGA Tour was a series of golf tournaments for elite female golfers from around the world which took place from February through December 2005. The tournaments were sanctioned by the United States–based Ladies Professional Golf Association (LPGA). Total prize money for all tournaments was $45,100,000.

Annika Sörenstam dominated the Tour in 2005, winning ten tournaments, including two of the four major tournaments, winning more than $2 million in prize money for the fifth consecutive season. Five other players earned over $1 million. Players from South Korea continued to be a growing force on the Tour, with seven different Korean players winning tournaments, including the two majors not won by Sörenstam: Birdie Kim at the U.S. Women's Open and Jeong Jang at the Women's British Open

For details of what happened in the main tournaments of the year see 2005 in golf.

== Tournament schedule and results ==
The number in parentheses after winners' names show the player's total number of official money, individual event wins on the LPGA Tour including that event.

Date	Tournament	Location	Winner	Purse ($)	Winner's share ($)
Feb 13	Women's World Cup of Golf	South Africa	Japan (Rui Kitada & Ai Miyazato)		
Feb 26	SBS Open at Turtle Bay	Hawaii	(Philippines) Jennifer Rosales (2)	1,000,000	150,000
Mar 6	MasterCard Classic	Mexico	(Sweden) Annika Sörenstam (57)	1,200,000	180,000
Mar 20	Safeway International	Arizona	(Sweden) Annika Sörenstam (58)	1,400,000	210,000
Mar 27	**Kraft Nabisco Championship**	California	(Sweden) Annika Sörenstam (59)	1,800,000	270,000
Apr 16	LPGA Takefuji Classic	Nevada	(United States) Wendy Ward (4)	1,100,000	165,000
Apr 24	Corona Morelia Championship	Mexico	(Sweden) Carin Koch (2)	1,000,000	150,000
May 1	Franklin American Mortgage Championship	Tennessee	(United States) Stacy Prammanasudh (1)	1,000,000	150,000
May 8	Michelob ULTRA Open at Kingsmill	Virginia	(United States) Cristie Kerr (5)	2,200,000	330,000
May 15	Chick-fil-A Charity Championship	Georgia	(Sweden) Annika Sörenstam (60)	1,600,000	240,000
May 22	Sybase Classic	New York	(United States) Paula Creamer (1)	1,250,000	187,500
May 29	LPGA Corning Classic	New York	(South Korea) Jimin Kang (1)	1,100,000	165,000
Jun 5	ShopRite LPGA Classic	New Jersey	(Sweden) Annika Sörenstam (61)	1,400,000	210,000
Jun 12	**McDonald's LPGA Championship**	Maryland	(Sweden) Annika Sörenstam (62)	1,800,000	270,000
Jun 19	Wegmans LPGA	New York	(Mexico) Lorena Ochoa (3)	1,500,000	225,000
Jun 26	**U.S. Women's Open**	Colorado	(South Korea) Birdie Kim (1)	3,100,000	560,000
Jul 3	HSBC Women's World Match Play Championship	New Jersey	(Colombia) Marisa Baena (1)	2,000,000	500,000
Jul 10	Jamie Farr Owens Corning Classic	Ohio	(United States) Heather Bowie (1)	1,200,000	180,000
Jul 17	BMO Financial Group Canadian Women's Open	Nova Scotia	(South Korea) Meena Lee (1)	1,300,000	195,000
Jul 23	Evian Masters	France	(United States) Paula Creamer (2)	2,500,000	375,000
Jul 31	**Weetabix Women's British Open**	England	(South Korea) Jeong Jang (1)	1,800,000	280,208
Aug 21	Safeway Classic	Oregon	(South Korea) Kang Soo-yun (1)	1,400,000	210,000
Aug 28	Wendy's Championship for Children	Ohio	(United States) Cristie Kerr (6)	1,100,000	165,000
Sep 4	State Farm Classic	Illinois	(United States) Pat Hurst (4)	1,300,000	195,000
Sep 11	Solheim Cup	Indiana	(United States) Team USA	n/a	
Sep 18	John Q. Hammons Hotel Classic	Oklahoma	(Sweden) Annika Sörenstam (63)	1,000,000	150,000
Oct 2	Office Depot Championship	California	(South Korea) Hee-Won Han (4)	1,300,000	195,000
Oct 9	Longs Drugs Challenge	California	(Chile) Nicole Perrot (1)	1,000,000	150,000
Oct 16	Samsung World Championship	California	(Sweden) Annika Sörenstam (64)	850,000	212,500
Oct 30	CJ Nine Bridges Classic	South Korea	(South Korea) Jee Young Lee (1)	1,350,000	202,500
Nov 6	Mizuno Classic	Japan	(Sweden) Annika Sörenstam (65)	1,000,000	150,000
Nov 13	The Mitchell Company Tournament of Champions	Alabama	(United States) Christina Kim (2)	850,000	138,000
Nov 19	ADT Championship	Florida	(Sweden) Annika Sörenstam (66)	1,000,000	215,000
Dec 11	Lexus Cup	Singapore	International Team	n/a	
Dec 18	Wendy's 3-Tour Challenge	Nevada	Champions Tour	n/a	

Tournaments in bold are majors.

== Leaders ==
Money List leaders

Rank	Player	Country	Earnings ($)	Events
1	Annika Sörenstam	Sweden	2,588,240	20
2	Paula Creamer	United States	1,531,780	25
3	Cristie Kerr	United States	1,360,941	22
4	Lorena Ochoa	Mexico	1,201,786	23
5	Jang Jeong	South Korea	1,131,986	28
6	Natalie Gulbis	United States	1,010,154	27
7	Meena Lee	South Korea	870,182	28
8	Hee-Won Han	South Korea	856,364	27
9	Gloria Park	South Korea	842,349	26
10	Catriona Matthew	Scotland	776,924	26

Scoring Average leaders

Rank	Player	Country	Average
1	Annika Sörenstam	Sweden	69.33
2	Cristie Kerr	United States	70.86
3	Paula Creamer	United States	70.98
4	Jang Jeong	South Korea	71.17
5	Natalie Gulbis	United States	71.24

== Award winners ==
The three competitive awards given out by the LPGA each year are:

- The Rolex Player of the Year is awarded based on a formula in which points are awarded for top-10 finishes and are doubled at the LPGA's four major championships. The points system is: 30 points for first; 12 points for second; nine points for third; seven points for fourth; six points for fifth; five points for sixth; four points for seventh; three points for eighth; two points for ninth and one point for 10th.
  - 2005 Winner: Annika Sörenstam. Runner-up: Paula Creamer
- The Vare Trophy, named for Glenna Collett-Vare, is given to the player with the lowest scoring average for the season.
  - 2005 Winner: Annika Sörenstam. Runner-up: Cristie Kerr
- The Louis Suggs Rolex Rooke of the Year Award is awarded to the first-year player on the LPGA Tour who scores the highest in a points competition in which points are awarded at all full-field domestic events and doubled at the LPGA's four major championships. The points system is: 150 points for first; 80 points for second; 75 points for third; 70 points for fourth; and 65 points for fifth. After fifth place, points are awarded in increments of three, beginning at sixth place with 62 points. Rookies who make the cut in an event and finish below 41st each receive five points. The award is named after Louise Suggs, one of the founders of the LPGA.
  - 2005 Winner: Paula Creamer. Runner-up: Meena Lee

== See also ==
- 2005 in golf
