= 1984 NCAA women's golf championship =

1984 NCAA Women's Golf Championship
Tournament information
- Location: Athens, Georgia, U.S. 33.915973°N 83.372005°W
- Course: University of Georgia Golf Course

Statistics
- Par: 73
- Field: 17 teams

Champion
- Team: Miami (FL) (1st title); Individual: Cindy Schreyer, Georgia
- Team: 1,214 (+46); Individual: 297 (+5)

Location map
- Location in the United States Location in Georgia

The 1984 NCAA Women's Golf Championships were contested at the third annual NCAA-sanctioned golf tournament to determine the individual and team national champions of women's collegiate golf in the United States. Until 1996, the NCAA would hold just one women's golf championship for all programs across Division I, Division II, and Division III.

The tournament was held again at the University of Georgia Golf Course in Athens, Georgia.

Miami (FL) won the team championship, the Hurricanes' first.

Cindy Schreyer, from Georgia, won the individual title.

== Individual results ==
=== Individual champion ===
- Cindy Schreyer, Georgia (297, +5)

== Team results ==
| Rank | Team | Score |
|---|---|---|
| 1 | Miami (FL) | 1,214 |
| 2 | Arizona State | 1,221 |
| 3 | Furman | 1,226 |
| 4 | Florida | 1,228 |
| 5 | South Florida | 1,237 |
| 6 | Tulsa | 1,238 |
| 7 | Duke | 1,244 |
| 8 | New Mexico | 1,245 |
| 9 | Stanford | 1,254 |
| 10 | Ohio State | 1,261 |
| 11 | Texas | 1,273 |
| 12 | North Carolina | 1,277 |
| 13 | Texas A&M | 1,286 |
| 14 | TCU (DC) | 1,292 |
| 15 | U.S. International | 1,297 |
| 16 | Michigan State | 1,302 |
| 17 | San José State | 1,303 |

- DC = Defending champion
- Debut appearance
