= 1992 NCAA women's golf championship =

1992 NCAA Women's Golf Championship
Tournament information
- Location: Tempe, Arizona, U.S. 33.428°N 111.922°W
- Course: ASU Karsten Golf Course

Statistics
- Par: 72 (288)
- Field: 17 teams

Champion
- Team: San Jose State (3rd title); Individual: Vicki Goetze, Georgia
- Team: 1,171 (+19); Individual: 280 (−8)

Location map
- Location in the United States Location in Arizona

The 1992 NCAA Women's Golf Championships were contested at the 11th annual NCAA-sanctioned golf tournament to determine the individual and team national champions of women's collegiate golf in the United States. Until 1996, the NCAA would hold just one annual women's golf championship for all programs across Division I, Division II, and Division III.

The tournament was held at the Karsten Golf Course in Tempe, Arizona.

San Jose State won the team championship, the Spartans' third win.

Vicki Goetze, of Georgia, won the individual title.

== Individual results ==
=== Individual champion ===
- Vicki Goetze, Georgia (280, −8)

== Team leaderboard ==
Rank	Team	Score
1	San José State	1,171
2	Arizona	1,175
3	Georgia	1,181
4	Stanford	1,187
5	UCLA (DC)	1,193
6	Texas	1,198
7	Oklahoma State	1,200
8	North Carolina	1,203
9	Arizona	1,206
10	Miami (FL)	1,220
11	Furman	1,223
12	Duke	1,227
13	Indiana	1,229
14	Florida State	1,236
T15	SMU	1,239
T15	USC	1,239
17	Kentucky	1,246

- DC = Defending champion
- Debut appearance
