= 2003 NCAA Division I women's golf championship =

2003 NCAA Division I Women's Golf Championship
Tournament information
- Location: West Lafayette, Indiana, U.S. 40.441944°N 86.9125°W
- Course: Birck Boilermaker Golf Complex

Statistics
- Par: 71 (284)
- Field: 24 teams

Champion
- Team: USC (1st title); Individual: Mikaela Parmlid, USC
- Team: 1,197 (+15); Individual: 297 (+13)

Location map
- Location in the United States Location in Indiana

The 2003 NCAA Division I Women's Golf Championships were contested at the 22nd annual NCAA-sanctioned golf tournament to determine the individual and team national champions of women's Division I collegiate golf in the United States.

The tournament was held at the Birck Boilermaker Golf Complex in West Lafayette, Indiana.

USC won the team championship, the Trojans' first.

Mikaela Parmlid, also from USC, won the individual title.

== Individual results ==
=== Individual champion ===
- Mikaela Parmlid, USC (297, +13)

== Team leaderboard ==
Rank	Team	Score
1	USC	1,197
2	Pepperdine	1,212
3	Texas	1,213
4	Ohio State	1,214
T5	Oklahoma State	1,216
T5	UCLA	1,216
7	Arizona	1,217
8	Florida	1,221
9	Auburn	1,224
10	Duke (DC)	1,225
11	Georgia	1,226
12	Purdue	1,234
13	North Carolina	1,241
T14	California	1,242
T14	Vanderbilt	1,242
16	Stanford	1,245
17	South Carolina	1,248
18	Arizona State	1,250
T19	Florida State	1,256
T19	Kent State	1,256
21	Tulsa	1,257
22	Nebraska	1,281
23	Washington State	1,288
24	Wisconsin	1,291

- DC = Defending champion
- Debut appearance
