= 2023 NCAA Division I women's golf championship =

2023 NCAA Division I Women's Golf Championship
Tournament information
- Dates: May 19–24, 2023
- Location: Scottsdale, Arizona, U.S.
- Course(s): Grayhawk Golf Club (Arizona State University)
- Organized by: NCAA; The Thunderbirds

Statistics
- Par: 72
- Length: 6,368 yards
- Field: 167 players, 30 teams

Champion
- Team: Wake Forest; Individual: Rose Zhang (Stanford)
- Team: 3–1 vs. USC; Individual: 278 (−10)

The 2023 NCAA Division I Women's Golf Championship was contested May 19–24 at Grayhawk Golf Club in Scottsdale, Arizona. It was the 41st annual tournament to establish the national champions of the 2023 season in NCAA Division I women's collegiate golf. The tournament was hosted by the Arizona State University & The Thunderbirds. There are both team and individual championships.

It was the third consecutive year that the men's and women's Division I golf tournaments were played at the same location; the 2023 NCAA Division I Men's Golf Championship will be held in Scottsdale after the women's championship from May 26–31.

== Regional qualifying tournaments ==
- There were six regional sites that held the qualifying tournaments across the United States from May 8–10, 2023.
- The five lowest scoring teams from each of the regional sites qualified to compete at the national championships as team and individual players.
- An additional individual with the lowest score in their regional, whose teams did not qualify, qualified to compete for the individual title in the national championship.

Regional name	Golf course	Location	Qualified teams^	Additionally qualified
Athens	University of Georgia Golf Course	Athens, Georgia	1. Georgia; 2. South Carolina; 3. San Jose State; 4. Ole Miss; 5. Augusta	Leon Takagi, Kent State
Palm Beach Gardens	PGA National	Palm Beach Gardens, Florida	1. Michigan State; 2. Duke; 3. Texas; 4. Northwestern; 5. LSU	Sara Byrne, Miami (FL)
Pullman	Palouse Ridge	Pullman, Washington	1. Stanford; 2. Clemson; 3. USC; 4. Baylor; 5. Texas Tech	Tiffany Le, UC Riverside
Raleigh	Lonnie Poole Golf Course	Raleigh, North Carolina	1. Arizona; 2. NC State; 3. Wake Forest; 4. TCU; 5. Florida State	Dorota Zalewska, Chattanooga
San Antonio	TPC San Antonio	San Antonio, Texas	1. Pepperdine; 2. SMU; 3. Oklahoma State; 4. Texas A&M; 5. New Mexico	Camryn Carreon, UTSA
Westfield	The Club at Chatham Hills	Westfield, Indiana	1. Mississippi State; 2. Oregon State; 3. Vanderbilt; 4. Virginia; 5. Tulsa	Isabella McCauley, Minnesota

^ Teams listed in qualifying order.

== Venue ==
This was the third time the NCAA Division I Women's Golf Championship was held at Grayhawk Golf Club and the fourth time the tournament has been hosted by the Arizona State University.

== Format ==
Similar to 2015 NCAA Division I Women's Golf Championship, all teams competed for three days (54 holes) on a stroke-play basis from Friday until Sunday. On Monday, the lowest scoring player was awarded as the national champion for the individual title at the conclusion of the 72 holes stroke-play event. At the same time, the lowest scoring eight teams advanced to the match-play team event. The quarterfinals and semifinals of match-play event will be played on Tuesday, May 23 and the finals will be played on Wednesday, May 24.

== Team competition ==
=== Leaderboard ===
(Par: 288, Total: 1152)

Place	Team	Round 1	Round 2	Round 3	Round 4	Total	To par
1	Stanford	288	273	290	282	1133	−19
2	Texas	292	276	290	280	1138	−14
3	Wake Forest	279	280	299	281	1139	−13
4	South Carolina	286	276	302	289	1153	+1
5	USC	296	276	290	292	1154	+2
6	Florida State	288	286	289	292	1155	+3
7	Texas A&M	287	284	298	287	1156	+4
8	Pepperdine	295	279	296	290	1160	+8
T9	Arizona	292	288	289	294	1163	+11
T9	New Mexico	287	288	301	287	1163	+11
T11	SMU	291	295	295	283	1164	+12
T11	Oklahoma State	280	291	300	293	1164	+12
13	Mississippi State	301	288	291	285	1165	+13
T14	Georgia	286	290	294	297	1167	+15
T14	LSU	294	288	295	290	1167	+15

Eliminated teams: San Jose State (882), Baylor (883), Michigan State (885), Duke (885), TCU (886), Texas Tech (890), Northwestern (892), Oregon State (892), Clemson (893), Virginia (893), Augusta (896), Vanderbilt (897), Ole Miss (898), Tulsa (914), NC State (917)

- The top 15 teams after 54 holes proceeded to the final round.

=== Match-play bracket ===
- The eight teams with the lowest stroke play total advanced into the match-play event.

Quarterfinals; May 23, morning
1	Stanford	3
8	Pepperdine	1
4	South Carolina	1
5	USC	3
3	Wake Forest	3
6	Florida State	1
2	Texas	1
7	Texas A&M	3

Semifinals; May 23, afternoon
1	Stanford	1
5	USC	3
3	Wake Forest	3
7	Texas A&M	0

Final; May 24
5	USC	1
3	Wake Forest	3

== Individual competition ==
May 22, 2023 (Par:72, Total: 288)

Place	Player	University	Score	To par
1	Rose Zhang	Stanford	72-67-71-67=278	−10
T2	Lucía López-Ortega	San Jose State	68-69-71-71=279	−9
T2	Catherine Park	USC	71-64-71-73=279	−9
4	Maddison Hinson-Tolchard	Oklahoma State	66-70-74-70=280	−8
T5	Ingrid Lindblad	LSU	70-72-68-71=281	−7
T5	Michelle Zhang	SMU	72-72-67-70=281	−7
T7	Charlotte Heath	Florida State	71-71-69-71=282	−6
T7	Lauren Walsh	Wake Forest	67-67-79-69=282	−6
T7	Pimmada Wongthanavimok	Arizona	69-73-69-71=282	−6
T10	Sadie Englemann	Stanford	71-69-74-69=283	−5
T10	Chayse Gomez	Oregon State	71-71-70-70=283	−5
T10	Huai-Chien Hsu	Texas	72-69-71-71=283	−5

The remaining 88 players from the top 15 teams and the top 9 individuals outside of those teams competed for the individual championship title after the 54-hole cut.
