= 2002 NCAA Division I women's golf championship =

2002 NCAA Division I Women's Golf Championship
Tournament information
- Location: Auburn, Washington, U.S. 47.309421°N 122.153968°W
- Course: Washington National Golf Club

Statistics
- Par: 71 (284)
- Field: 24 teams

Champion
- Team: Duke (2nd title); Individual: Virada Nirapathpongporn, Duke
- Team: 1,164 (+6); Individual: 279 (−5)

Location map
- Location in the United States Location in Washington

The 2002 NCAA Division I Women's Golf Championships were contested at the 21st annual NCAA-sanctioned golf tournament to determine the individual and team national champions of women's Division I collegiate golf in the United States.

The tournament was held at the Washington National Golf Club in Auburn, Washington.

Duke won the team championship, the Blue Devils' second.

Virada Nirapathpongporn, also from Duke, won the individual title.

== Individual results ==
=== Individual champion ===
- Virada Nirapathpongporn, Duke (279, −5)

== Team leaderboard ==
Rank	Team	Score
1	Duke	1,164
T2	Arizona	1,170
T2	Auburn	1,170
T2	Texas	1,170
5	Georgia (DC)	1,176
T6	Florida	1,179
T6	Oklahoma	1,179
8	Ohio State	1,180
T9	Arizona State	1,186
T9	Pepperdine	1,186
11	Stanford	1,187
12	Tulsa	1,188
13	Oklahoma State	1,189
14	USC	1,192
15	California	1,193
16	Purdue	1,198
17	Michigan	1,199
18	Vanderbilt	1,201
19	Michigan State	1,202
20	Washington	1,203
21	UCLA	1,204
22	Wake Forest	1,206
23	South Carolina	1,217
24	South Florida	1,271

- DC = Defending champion
- Debut appearance
