= 1989 NCAA women's golf championship =

1989 NCAA Women's Golf Championship
Tournament information
- Location: Stanford, California, U.S. 37.4216°N 122.1837°W
- Course: Stanford Golf Course

Statistics
- Par: 73
- Field: 17 teams

Champion
- Team: San Jose State (2nd title); Individual: Pat Hurst, San José State
- Team: 1,208 (+40); Individual: 292 (E)

Location map
- Location in the United States Location in California

The 1989 NCAA Women's Golf Championships were contested at the eighth annual NCAA-sanctioned golf tournament to determine the individual and team national champions of women's collegiate golf in the United States. Until 1996, the NCAA would hold just one annual women's golf championship for all programs across Division I, Division II, and Division III.

The tournament was held at the Stanford Golf Course in Stanford, California.

San Jose State won the team championship, the Spartans' second.

Future LPGA Major champion Pat Hurst, from San Jose State, won the individual title.

== Individual results ==
=== Individual champion ===
- Pat Hurst, San José State (292, E)

== Team results ==
Rank	Team	Score
1	San José State	1,208
2	Tulsa	1,209
3	Oklahoma State	1,219
4	Arizona	1,220
5	Florida	1,230
T6	Arizona State	1,234
T6	Georgia	1,234
8	North Carolina	1,237
9	USC	1,238
T10	Stanford	1,240
T10	Texas	1,240
12	Minnesota	1,249
13	Auburn	1,251
14	TCU	1,252
15	New Mexico State	1,253
16	SMU	1,257
17	Ohio State	1,287

- Debut appearance
