= 2008 Kraft Nabisco Championship =

Coordinates: 33.798°N 116.433°W

Tournament information
- Dates: April 3–6, 2008
- Location: Rancho Mirage, California
- Courses: Mission Hills Country Club; Dinah Shore Tourn. Course
- Tour: LPGA Tour
- Format: Stroke play - 72 holes

Statistics
- Par: 72
- Length: 6,673 yards (6,102 m)
- Field: 110 players, 71 after cut
- Cut: 149 (+5)
- Prize fund: $2.0 million
- Winner's share: $300,000

Champion
- (Mexico) Lorena Ochoa
- 277 (−11)

Location in the United States
Location in California

The 2008 Kraft Nabisco Championship was played April 3–6 at Mission Hills Country Club in Rancho Mirage, California. This was the 37th edition of the Kraft Nabisco Championship, and the 26th as a major championship.

Top-ranked Lorena Ochoa shot a bogey-free 67 in the final round to win her only Kraft Nabisco Championship, five strokes ahead of runners-up Suzann Pettersen and Annika Sörenstam. It was her second consecutive and final major title; she won the Women's British Open in 2007.

== Round summaries ==
=== First round ===
Thursday, April 3, 2008

| Place | Player | Score | To par |
|---|---|---|---|
| 1 | (England) Karen Stupples | 67 | −5 |
| T2 | (Japan) Ai Miyazato | 68 | −4 |
| T2 | (Mexico) Lorena Ochoa | 68 | −4 |
| T4 | (United States) Natalie Gulbis | 69 | −3 |
| T4 | (United States) Heather Young | 69 | −3 |
| T6 | (Sweden) Maria Hjorth | 70 | −2 |
| T6 | (South Korea) Mi-Hyun Kim | 70 | −2 |
| T6 | (Sweden) Liselotte Neumann | 70 | −2 |
| T6 | (Colombia) Mariajo Uribe (a) | 70 | −2 |
| T10 | (United States) Mallory Blackwelder (a) | 71 | −1 |
| T10 | (South Korea) Chung Il-mi | 71 | −1 |
| T10 | (United States) Paula Creamer | 71 | −1 |
| T10 | (South Korea) Meena Lee | 71 | −1 |
| T10 | (United States) Morgan Pressel | 71 | −1 |
| T10 | (United States) Michele Redman | 71 | −1 |
| T10 | (Sweden) Annika Sörenstam | 71 | −1 |
| T10 | (Japan) Momoko Ueda | 71 | −1 |

=== Second round ===
Friday, April 4, 2008

| Place | Player | Score | To par |
|---|---|---|---|
| T1 | (Mexico) Lorena Ochoa | 68-71=139 | −5 |
| T1 | (United States) Heather Young | 69-70=139 | −5 |
| T3 | (Sweden) Maria Hjorth | 70-70=140 | −4 |
| T3 | (South Korea) Mi-Hyun Kim | 70-70=140 | −4 |
| T5 | (South Korea) Hee-Won Han | 72-69=141 | −3 |
| T5 | (Sweden) Annika Sörenstam | 71-70=141 | −3 |
| T7 | (Japan) Ai Miyazato | 68-74=142 | −2 |
| T7 | (Sweden) Liselotte Neumann | 70-72=142 | −2 |
| T7 | (England) Karen Stupples | 67-75=142 | −2 |
| T7 | (South Korea) Se Ri Pak | 72-70=142 | −2 |

Amateurs: Uribe (E), Blumenherst (+2), Blackwelder (+3)

=== Third round ===
Saturday, April 5, 2008

| Place | Player | Score | To par |
|---|---|---|---|
| 1 | (Mexico) Lorena Ochoa | 68-71-71=210 | −6 |
| 2 | (South Korea) Hee-Won Han | 72-69-70=211 | −5 |
| T3 | (Sweden) Maria Hjorth | 70-70-72=212 | −4 |
| T3 | (South Korea) Seon-Hwa Lee | 73-71-68=212 | −4 |
| T5 | (South Korea) Inbee Park | 73-70-70=213 | −3 |
| T5 | (United States) Heather Young | 69-70-74=213 | −3 |
| T7 | (Norway) Suzann Pettersen | 74-75-65=214 | −2 |
| T7 | (Sweden) Annika Sörenstam | 71-70-73=214 | −2 |
| T9 | (South Korea) Na Yeon Choi | 74-72-69=215 | −1 |
| T9 | (South Korea) Se Ri Pak | 72-70-73=215 | −1 |

=== Final round ===
Sunday, April 6, 2008

| Place | Player | Score | To par | Money ($) |
|---|---|---|---|---|
| 1 | (Mexico) Lorena Ochoa | 68-71-71-67=277 | −11 | 300,000 |
| T2 | (Norway) Suzann Pettersen | 74-75-65-68=282 | −6 | 160,369 |
| T2 | (Sweden) Annika Sörenstam | 71-70-73-68=282 | −6 | 160,369 |
| 4 | (Sweden) Maria Hjorth | 70-70-72-71=283 | −5 | 104,317 |
| 5 | (South Korea) Seon-Hwa Lee | 73-71-68-72=284 | −4 | 83,963 |
| T6 | (South Korea) Na Yeon Choi | 74-72-69-70=285 | −3 | 58,859 |
| T6 | (South Korea) Hee-Won Han | 72-69-70-74=285 | −3 | 58,859 |
| T6 | (South Korea) Mi-Hyun Kim | 70-70-76-69=285 | −3 | 58,859 |
| 9 | (South Korea) Inbee Park | 73-70-70-73=286 | −2 | 45,289 |
| T10 | (South Korea) Se Ri Pak | 72-70-73-72=287 | −1 | 39,692 |
| T10 | (United States) Heather Young | 69-70-74-74=287 | −1 | 39,692 |

Amateurs: Blumenherst (+5), Uribe (+12), Blackwelder (+14)

==== Scorecard ====
Final round

| Hole | 1 | 2 | 3 | 4 | 5 | 6 | 7 | 8 | 9 | 10 | 11 | 12 | 13 | 14 | 15 | 16 | 17 | 18 |
|---|---|---|---|---|---|---|---|---|---|---|---|---|---|---|---|---|---|---|
| Par | 4 | 5 | 4 | 4 | 3 | 4 | 4 | 3 | 5 | 4 | 5 | 4 | 4 | 3 | 4 | 4 | 3 | 5 |
| (Mexico) Ochoa | −7 | −8 | −8 | −8 | −8 | −8 | −8 | −9 | −10 | −11 | −11 | −11 | −11 | −11 | −11 | −11 | −11 | −11 |
| (Norway) Pettersen | −3 | −4 | −4 | −4 | −3 | −3 | −4 | −5 | −5 | −5 | −5 | −6 | −6 | −6 | −6 | −6 | −6 | −6 |
| (Sweden) Sörenstam | −2 | −3 | −3 | −3 | −3 | −3 | −4 | −5 | −5 | −5 | −6 | −6 | −5 | −5 | −5 | −6 | −6 | −6 |
| (Sweden) Hjorth | −3 | −4 | −4 | −4 | −3 | −4 | −4 | −5 | −5 | −5 | −6 | −6 | −6 | −6 | −6 | −6 | −6 | −5 |
| (South Korea) Lee | −4 | −5 | −5 | −5 | −2 | −2 | −4 | −4 | −3 | −3 | −4 | −4 | −4 | −4 | −4 | −4 | −4 | −4 |
| (South Korea) Choi | −1 | −1 | −1 | −1 | −2 | −1 | −2 | −2 | −2 | −2 | −2 | −2 | −2 | −2 | −3 | −3 | −3 | −3 |
| (South Korea) Han | −5 | −5 | −5 | −6 | −6 | −7 | −6 | −5 | −4 | −4 | −4 | −4 | −3 | −3 | −2 | −2 | −2 | −3 |
| (South Korea) Kim | E | E | E | −1 | −1 | −1 | −1 | −1 | −2 | −1 | −2 | −3 | −3 | −3 | −3 | −2 | −2 | −3 |
| (South Korea) Park | −3 | −4 | −3 | −3 | −3 | −3 | −3 | −3 | −3 | −3 | −4 | −4 | −3 | −2 | −2 | −2 | −2 | −2 |
| (South Korea) Pak | E | E | E | E | E | −1 | −1 | −1 | E | E | E | E | −1 | −1 | −1 | +1 | E | −1 |
| (United States) Young | −3 | −3 | −3 | −3 | −3 | −3 | −2 | −2 | −2 | −2 | −2 | −2 | −2 | −2 | −2 | −2 | −1 | −1 |

Cumulative tournament scores, relative to par

| Eagle | Birdie | Bogey | Double bogey | Triple bogey+ |
