= 1983 NCAA women's golf championship =

1983 NCAA Women's Golf Championship
Tournament information
- Location: Athens, Georgia, U.S. 33.915973°N 83.372005°W
- Course: University of Georgia Golf Course

Statistics
- Par: 74
- Field: 17 teams

Champion
- Team: TCU (1st title); Individual: Penny Hammel, Miami (FL)
- Team: 1,193 (+9); Individual: 284 (−12)

Location map
- Location in the United States Location in Georgia

The 1983 NCAA Women's Golf Championships were contested at the second annual NCAA-sanctioned golf tournament to determine the individual and team national champions of women's collegiate golf in the United States. Until 1996, the NCAA would hold just one women's golf championship for all programs across Division I, Division II, and Division III.

The tournament was held at the University of Georgia Golf Course in Athens, Georgia.

TCU won the team championship, the Horned Frogs' first.

Penny Hammel, from Miami (FL), won the individual title.

== Individual results ==
=== Individual champion ===
- Penny Hammel, Miami (FL) (284, -12)

== Team results ==
Rank	Team	Score
1	TCU	1,193
2	Tulsa (DC)	1,196
3	Georgia	1,206
4	SMU	1,209
5	Florida	1,215
6	Miami (FL)	1,216
7	Lamar	1,226
8	FIU	1,229
9	Furman	1,230
10	South Florida	1,233
11	Arizona	1,240
12	New Mexico	1,242
13	Arizona State	1,257
14	Ohio State	1,260
15	Texas	1,268
16	Duke	1,288
17	Illinois State	1,332

- DC = Defending champion
- Debut appearance
