= 1987 NCAA women's golf championship =

1987 NCAA Women's Golf Championship
Tournament information
- Location: Albuquerque, New Mexico, U.S. 35.039333°N 106.610778°W
- Course: University of New Mexico Golf Course

Statistics
- Par: 73
- Field: 17 teams

Champion
- Team: San Jose State (1st title); Individual: Caroline Keggi, New Mexico
- Team: 1,187 (+19); Individual: 289 (−3)

Location map
- Location in the United States Location in New Mexico

The 1987 NCAA Women's Golf Championships were contested at the sixth annual NCAA-sanctioned golf tournament to determine the individual and team national champions of women's collegiate golf in the United States. Until 1996, the NCAA would hold just one annual women's golf championship for all programs across Division I, Division II, and Division III.

The tournament was held at the University of New Mexico Golf Course in Albuquerque, New Mexico.

San Jose State won the team championship, the Spartans' first.

Caroline Keggi, from New Mexico, won the individual title.

== Individual results ==
=== Individual champion ===
- Caroline Keggi, New Mexico (289, −3)

== Team results ==
| Rank | Team | Score |
|---|---|---|
| 1 | San Jose State | 1,187 |
| 2 | Furman | 1,188 |
| 3 | Florida | 1,190 |
| 4 | USC | 1,191 |
| 5 | Miami (FL) | 1,192 |
| 6 | Oklahoma State | 1,203 |
| T7 | Duke | 1,205 |
| T7 | New Mexico | 1,205 |
| 9 | Alabama | 1,207 |
| 10 | Stanford | 1,210 |
| 11 | Arizona State | 1,211 |
| 12 | Arizona | 1,214 |
| 13 | Indiana | 1,215 |
| T14 | U.S. International | 1,225 |
| T14 | South Carolina | 1,225 |
| 16 | UCLA | 1,228 |
| 17 | Texas | 1,229 |

- DC = Defending champion
- Debut appearance
