= 1982 NCAA women's golf championship =

1982 NCAA Women's Golf Championship
Tournament information
- Location: Stanford, California, U.S. 37.4216°N 122.1837°W
- Course: Stanford Golf Course

Statistics
- Par: 72
- Field: 19 teams

Champion
- Team: Tulsa (1st title); Individual: Kathy Baker, Tulsa
- Team: 1,191 (+39); Individual: 295 (+7)

Location map
- Location in the United States Location in California

The 1982 NCAA Women's Golf Championships were the inaugural NCAA-sanctioned golf tournament to determine the individual and team national champions of women's collegiate golf in the United States. Through 1996, the NCAA would hold only one women's golf championship for programs across Division I, Division II, and Division III.

The tournament was held at the Stanford Golf Course in Stanford, California.

Tulsa won the team championship.

Kathy Baker, from Tulsa, won the individual title.

A 13th and final AIAW Women's Golf Championship was also held this year and also won by Tulsa.

== Individual results ==
=== Individual champion ===
- Kathy Baker, Tulsa

== Team results ==
Rank	Team	Score
1	Tulsa	1,191
2	TCU	1,227
3	Oklahoma State	1,233
4	Florida	1,234
5	Texas A&M	1,246
6	Stanford	1,247
7	UCLA	1,248
8	New Mexico	1,251
9	USC	1,253
10	Arizona State	1,254
11	SMU	1,256
12	BYU	1,267
T13	Arizona	1,269
T13	San Jose State	1,269
15	FIU	1,273
T16	LSU	1,276
T16	North Carolina	1,276
18	Michigan State	1,286
19	Rollins	1,310
