= 2001 NCAA Division I women's golf championship =

2001 NCAA Division I Women's Golf Championship
Tournament information
- Location: Daytona Beach, Florida, U.S. 29.191667°N 81.108333°W
- Course: LPGA International

Statistics
- Par: 71 (284)
- Field: 24 teams

Champion
- Team: Georgia (1st title); Individual: Candy Hannemann, Duke
- Team: 1,176 (+3); Individual: 285 (+1)

Location map
- Location in the United States Location in Florida

The 2001 NCAA Division I Women's Golf Championships were contested at the 20th annual NCAA-sanctioned golf tournament to determine the individual and team national champions of women's Division I collegiate golf in the United States.

The tournament was held at LPGA International in Daytona Beach, Florida.

Georgia won the team championship, the Bulldogs' first.

Candy Hannemann, from Duke, won the individual title.

== Individual results ==
=== Individual champion ===
- Candy Hannemann, Duke (285, +1)

== Team leaderboard ==
Rank	Team	Score
1	Georgia	1,176
2	Duke	1,179
3	Texas	1,191
4	Auburn	1,193
T5	Oklahoma State	1,194
T5	UCLA	1,194
7	USC	1,196
8	Arizona	1,197
9	Stanford	1,215
10	Tulsa	1,208
11	New Mexico State	1,210
T12	LSU	1,210
T12	Michigan State	1,210
14	Pepperdine	1,211
15	Kent State	1,224
16	Washington	1,226
17	San José State	1,227
18	Arizona State	1,228
19	California	1,234
20	Purdue	1,236
21	New Mexico	1,237
22	Ohio State	1,247
23	South Florida	1,251
24	South Carolina	1,254

- DC = Defending champion
- Debut appearance
