= Arizona Wildcats women's golf =

College golf team

- Founded: 1979
- University: University of Arizona
- Conference: Big 12
- Athletic director: Dave Heeke
- Head coach: Giovana Maymon (1st season)
- Location: Tucson, Arizona
- Course: Tucson Country Club; Par: 72; Yards: 7,022
- Nickname: Arizona
- Colors: Cardinal and Navy

NCAA champions
- 1996, 2000, 2018

NCAA individual champions
- Susan Slaughter (1990); Annika Sörenstam (1991); Marisa Baena (1996); Jenna Daniels (2000)

NCAA runner-up
- 2002

NCAA match play
- 2018

NCAA Championship appearances
- 1982, 1983, 1987, 1988, 1989, 1990, 1991, 1992, 1993, 1995, 1996, 1997, 1998, 1999, 2000, 2001, 2002, 2003, 2004, 2006, 2007, 2008, 2009, 2010, 2011, 2013, 2014, 2015, 2016, 2018, 2019, 2021, 2023

Conference champions
- Pac-10/12; 1992, 1997, 1998, 1999, 2000, 2001, 2002, 2010, 2015 Big 12; 2025

Individual conference champions
- Pac-10/12; Annika Sorenstam (1992); Leta Lindley (1994); Marisa Baena (1996); Jenna Daniels (1998); Lorena Ochoa (2001)

The Arizona Wildcats women's golf is considered one of the best in all of women's collegiate golf, dating back to their first season in 1979. Since they have won three national championships in 1996, 2000, and 2018. The Wildcat Women have also had four individual national champions with Susan Slaughter in (1990), Annika Sörenstam in (1991), Marisa Baena in (1996) and Jenna Daniels in (2000).

On August 4, 2023, Arizona announced it would join the Big 12 Conference along with Arizona State, Colorado, and Utah beginning in the 2024–25 academic year.

Members of the Wildcat women's program have gone on to success on the LPGA Tour, led by 8-time LPGA Player of the Year Annika Sörenstam and 4-time LPGA Player of the Year Lorena Ochoa. Sörenstam is regarded as one of the best female golfers in history. Before stepping away from competitive golf at the end of the 2008 season, she had won 90 international tournaments as a professional, making her the female golfer with the most wins to her name. She has won 72 official LPGA Tour tournaments including ten majors and 18 other tournaments internationally, and she tops the LPGA's career money list with earnings of over $22 million—over $2 million ahead of her nearest rival while playing 187 fewer events. The winner of a record eight Player of the Year awards, and six Vare Trophies given to the LPGA player with the lowest seasonal scoring average, she is the only female golfer to shoot a 59 in competition. She holds various all-time scoring records including the lowest season scoring average: 68.6969 in 2004. Representing Europe in the Solheim Cup on eight occasions between 1994 and 2007, Sörenstam was the event's all-time leading points earner until her record was surpassed by England's Laura Davies during the 2011 Solheim Cup. Sörenstam also was captain of the 2017 European Solheim Cup team. In 2003, Sörenstam played in the Bank of America Colonial tournament to become the first woman to play in a PGA Tour event since 1945.

Lorena Ochoa was the top-ranked female golfer in the world for 158 consecutive and total weeks (both are LPGA Tour records), from April 23, 2007, to her retirement on May 2, 2010, at the age of 28 years old. As the first Mexican golfer of either gender to be ranked number one in the world, she is considered the best Mexican golfer and the best Latin American female golfer of all time. Ochoa was inducted into the World Golf Hall of Fame in 2017.

== Yearly record ==
Season	Coach	Conference	NCAA
Pac-10/12; Big 12
1981	JoAnne Lusk	4th	14th
1982	JoAnne Lusk	3rd	13th
1983	JoAnne Lusk	3rd	11th
1984	Kim Haddow	4th	
1985	Kim Haddow	4th	
1986	Kim Haddow	5th	
1987	Kim Haddow	4st	12th
1988	Kim Haddow	5th	8th
1989	Kim Haddow	3rd	4th
1990	Kim Haddow	2nd	7th
1991	Kim Haddow	2nd	3rd
1992	Kim Haddow	1st	2nd
1993	Kim Haddow	8th	14th
1994	Kim Haddow	6th	
1995	Kim Haddow/Rick LaRose	4th	12th
1996	Rick LaRose	T-3rd	1st
1997	Rick LaRose	1st	3rd
1998	Rick LaRose	1st	3rd
1999	Todd McCorkle	2nd	4th
2000	Todd McCorkle	1st	1st
2001	Greg Allen	1st	8th
2002	Greg Allen	1st	7th
2003	Greg Allen	2nd	7th
2004	Greg Allen	3rd	T-15th
2005	Greg Allen	4th	
2006	Greg Allen	5th	17th
2007	Greg Allen	4th	T-14th
2008	Shelly Haywood	4th	23rd
2009	Shelly Haywood	4th	16th
2010	Shelly Haywood/Laura Ianello	1st	5th
2011	Laura Ianello	2nd	15th
2012	Laura Ianello	3rd	
2013	Laura Ianello	T-4th	8th
2014	Laura Ianello	T-2nd	T-7th
2015	Laura Ianello	1st	T-5th
2016	Laura Ianello	4th	T-9th
2017	Laura Ianello	4th	
2018	Laura Ianello	T-3rd	1st
2019	Laura Ianello	2nd	6th
2020	Laura Ianello	Season canceled due to the Coronavirus Pandemic	
2021	Laura Ianello	4th	T-7st
2022	Laura Ianello	T-5th	
2023	Laura Ianello	4th	T-9th
2024	Laura Ianello	6th	
2025	Giovana Maymon	1st	
Total		Pac-12/Big 12:9	3

== Team tournament wins (84) ==
- 1982 Lady Aztec Invitational
- 1983 Wildcat Invitational
- 1988 Washington Invitational
- 1988 Dick McGuire Invitational
- 1988 Edean Ihlanfeldt Invitational
- 1989 Wildcat Invitational
- 1989 Shiseido Cup International
- 1989 Edean Ihlanfeldt Invitational
- 1990 Border Conference Championship
- 1990 Oregon Invitational
- 1991 Stanford Invitational
- 1991 Wildcat Invitational
- 1991 UCF Rotary Classic
- 1991 Golfsmith Betsy Rawls Longhorn Invitational
- 1991 Rainbow Wahine Invitational
- 1991 Dick McGuire Invitational
- 1991 Lady Sun Devil Invitational
- 1991 Edean Ihlanfeldt Invitational
- 1992 Wildcat Invitational
- 1992 Golfsmith Betsy Rawls Classic
- 1992 Rainbow Wahine Invitational
- 1992 Pac-10 Championships (1)
- 1996 LSU Fairwood Invitational
- 1996 Rainbow Wahine Invitational
- 1996 Buckeye Invitational
- 1996 NCAA West Regional
- 1996 NCAA Championships (1)
- 1996 Dick McGuire Invitational
- 1996 Rolex NCAA Preview
- 1997 LSU Fairwood Invitational
- 1997 PING/ASU Invitational
- 1997 Pac-10 Championships (2)
- 1997 Rolex NCAA Preview
- 1998 Pac-10 Championships (3)
- 1998 NCAA West Regional
- 1998 Stanford Intercollegiate
- 1998 Golf World Invitational
- 1999 Arizona Invitational
- 1999 Rainbow Wahine Invitational
- 1999 Dick McGuire Invitational
- 2000 Golf World Invitational
- 2000 TRW Regional Challenge
- 2000 Wildcat Invitational
- 2000 Rainbow Wahine Invitational
- 2000 PING/ASU Invitational
- 2000 Pac-10 Championships (4)
- 2000 NCAA West Regional
- 2000 NCAA Championships (2)
- 2000 Dick McGuire Invitational
- 2000 Stanford Pepsi Invitational
- 2001 TRW Regional Challenge
- 2001 Wildcat Invitational
- 2001 Pac-10 Championships (5)
- 2001 NCAA West Regional
- 2002 Pac-10 Championships (6)
- 2003 Edean Ihlanfeldt Invitational
- 2010 Las Vegas Collegiate Showdown
- 2010 Pac-10 Championships (7)
- 2010 NCAA West Regional
- 2010 Topy Cup
- 2011 Wildcat Invitational
- 2012 Wildcat Invitational
- 2012 UNLV Invitational
- 2012 Mason Rudolph Championship
- 2012 Windy City Collegiate Classic
- 2013 Dr. Donnis Thompson Invitational
- 2014 SunTrust Gator Invitational
- 2015 SunTrust Gator Invitational
- 2015 PING/ASU Invitational
- 2015 Pac-12 Championships (8)
- 2016 Wildcat Invitational
- 2017 Mountain View Collegiate
- 2018 Hawkeye El Tigre Invitational
- 2018 PING/ASU Invitational
- 2018 NCAA Championships (3)
- 2019 Pac-12 Preview
- 2019 UNLV Rebel Beach Invitational
- 2019 Hawkeye El Tigre Invitational
- 2020 Pac-12 Preview
- 2020 Wildcat Invitational
- 2022 NCAA Raleigh Regional
- 2023 Gators Invitational
- 2024 Folds of Honor Collegiate
- 2024 St. Andrews Links Collegiate
- 2025 Big 12 Championships (1)

== Individual champions ==
=== NCAA ===
Arizona has had four individuals claim the NCAA Individual Championship on four occasions.

NCAA Individual Champion
Year	Name
1990	Susan Slaughter
1991	Annika Sörenstam
1996	Marisa Baena
2000	Jenna Daniels

=== Regional ===
NCAA West Regional Championship
Year	Name
1996	Marisa Baena
1999	Jenna Daniels
2001	Natalie Gulbis
2008	Alison Walshe

NCAA Central Regional
Year	Name
2004	Erica Blasberg

=== Conference ===
Arizona has had five golfers win a conference title on five occasions.

Pac-10/12
Year	Name
1991	Annika Sörenstam
1994	Leta Lindley
1996	Marisa Baena
1998	Jenna Daniels
2001	Lorena Ochoa

== National honors ==
NCAA Coach of the Year
- 1996 – Kim Haddow

Pac-10/12 Coach of the Year
- 1992 – Kim Haddow
- 1998 – Rick LaRose
- 2000 – Todd McCorkle
- 2010 – Laura Ianello
- 2019 – Laura Ianello (Co-COY)

U.S. Women's Amateur champions
- 1996 – Heather Graff (US Public Links)
- 1997 – Marisa Baena (Runner Up)
- 2000 – Laura Myercough (Runner Up)

National College Player of the Year
- 1991 – Annika Sörenstam (NGCA, Golfweek)
- 1996 – Marisa Baena (Honda Award, NGCA)
- 1997 – Marisa Baena (Honda Award, NGCA)
- 2000 – Jenna Daniels (Honda Award, NGCA)
- 2001 – Lorena Ochoa (NGCA)
- 2002 – Lorena Ochoa (NGCA)
- 2003 – Erica Blasberg (Golfweek Magazine)

Pac-10/12 Player of the Year
- 2003 – Erica Blasberg

National Freshman of the Year
- 2001 – Lorena Ochoa (WGCA)
- 2003 – Erica Blasberg (WGCA)
- 2020 – Vivian Hou (WGCA)

Pac-10/12 Freshman of the Year
- 2001 – Lorena Ochoa
- 2003 – Erica Blasberg

Curtis Cup
- 2002 – Laura Myerscough
- 2004 – Erica Blasberg

All-American (selected by WGCA)
- 1988 – Martina Koch (2nd team)
- 1989 – Martina Koch (2nd team)
- 1990 – Mette Hageman (1st team)
- 1990 – Martina Koch (1st team)
- 1990 – Susan Slaughter (1st team)
- 1991 – Mette Hageman (1st team)
- 1991 – Annika Sörenstam (1st team)
- 1991 – Leta Lindley (1st team)
- 1992 – Annika Sörenstam (1st team)
- 1992 – Debbie Parks (1st team)
- 1992 – Leta Lindley (1st team)
- 1994 – Leta Lindley (1st team)
- 1996 – Marisa Baena (1st team)
- 1996 – Heather Graff (2nd team)
- 1997 – Marisa Baena (1st team)
- 1998 – Marisa Baena (1st team)
- 1998 – Jenna Daniels (2nd team)
- 1998 – Krissie Register (2nd team)
- 1999 – Jenna Daniels (2nd team)
- 2000 – Cristina Baena (2nd team)
- 2000 – Jenna Daniels (1st team)
- 2001 – Lorena Ochoa (1st team)
- 2001 – Natalie Gulbis (1st team)
- 2002 – Lorena Ochoa (1st team)
- 2003 – Erica Blasberg (1st team)
- 2004 – Erica Blasberg (1st team)
- 2007 – Alison Walshe (1st team)
- 2008 – Alison Walshe (1st team)
- 2010 – Margarita Ramos (2nd team)
- 2011 – Isabelle Boineau (2nd team)
- 2014 – Lindsey Weaver (2nd team)
- 2015 – Lindsey Weaver (2nd team)
- 2017 – Haley Moore (2nd team)
- 2019 – Bianca Pagdanganan (2nd team)
- 2019 – Yu-Sang Hou (2nd team)
- 2020 – Vivian Hou (1st team)
- 2020 – Yu-Sang Hou (2nd team)
- 2021 – Yu-Sang Hou (2nd team)

WGCA Academic All-American
- 1992 – Leta Lindley
- 1994 – Leta Lindley
- 1994 – Ulrika Johansson
- 1995 – Ulrika Johansson
- 1996 – Christina Tolerton
- 1997 – Christina Tolerton
- 1998 – Krissie Register
- 1998 – Jill Gomric
- 1999 – Krissie Register
- 1999 – Christina Monteiro
- 2000 – Christina Monteiro
- 2001 – Christina Monteiro
- 2002 – Cathie Williamson
- 2004 – Whitney Welch
- 2004 – Lani Elston
- 2005 – Whitney Welch
- 2005 – Lani Elston
- 2006 – Whitney Welch
- 2009 – Nikki Koller
- 2009 – Margarita Ramos
- 2010 – Nikki Koller
- 2013 – Kendall Prince
- 2014 – Kendall Prince
- 2014 – Jessica Vasilic
- 2014 – Andrea Vilarasau
- 2014 – Wanasa Zhou
- 2015 – Kendall Prince
- 2015 – Wanasa Zhou
- 2016 – Jessica Vasilic
- 2016 – Wanasa Zhou
- 2017 – Jessica Vasilic
- 2017 – Wanasa Zhou
- 2018 – Sandra Nordaas
- 2019 – Ya Chun Chang
- 2019 – Sandra Nordaas
- 2020 – Ya Chun Chang
- 2020 – Vivian Hou
- 2020 – Gile Bite Starkute
- 2020 – Therese Warner
- 2021 – Ya Chun Chang
- 2021 – Maya Benita
- 2021 – Gile Bite Starkute
- 2021 – Therese Warner
- 2022 – Maya Benita
- 2022 – Ya Chun Chang
- 2022 – Carolina Melgrati
- 2022 – Gile Bite Starkute
- 2022 – Caitlin Whitehead
- 2023 – Carolina Melgrati
- 2023 – Julia Misemer
- 2023 – Gile Bite Starkute

== Individual scoring record ==
Low 18-hole total in relation to par
Player	Date	Score
Haley Moore	Oct 26, 2017	64 (−8)
Therese Warner	Mar 8, 2021	65 (−7)
Gigi Stoll		65 (−7)
Wanasa Zhou	Mar 11, 2017	65 (−7)
Haley Moore	Sep 13, 2016	65 (−7)

Low 18-hole aggregate total
Player	Date	Score
Haley Moore	Oct 26, 2017	64 (−8)
Therese Warner	Mar 8, 2021	65 (−7)
Gigi Stoll		65 (−7)
Wanasa Zhou	Mar 11, 2017	65 (−7)
Haley Moore	Sep 13, 2016	65 (−7)

Low 54-hole total in relation to par
Player	Season	Score
Wanasa Zhou	2016–17	203 (−13)
Manon Gidali	2011–12	204 (−12)
Haley Moore	2016–17	206 (−10)
Lorena Ochoa	2001–02	206 (−10)
Krystal Quihuis	2016–17	206 (−10)

Low 54-hole aggregate total
Player	Season	Score
Wanasa Zhou	2016–17	203 (−13)
Manon Gidali	2011–12	204 (−12)
Haley Moore	2016–17	206 (−10)
Lorena Ochoa	2001–02	206 (−10)
Krystal Quihuis	2016–17	206 (−10)

Career scoring average (min. 2 seasons played)
Player	Average	Years	Rounds
Lorena Ochoa	70.85	2000–02	60
Vivian Hou	71.95	2019–21	41
Erica Blasberg	72.32	2002–04	61
Haley Moore	72.45	2015–19	118
Yu-Sang Hou	72.48	2017–21	96

Single-season scoring average (Min. 18 rounds played)
Player		Years	Rounds
Lorena Ochoa	70.13	2001–02	30
Vivian Hou	70.68	2019–20	19
Vivian Hou	71.40	2016–17	30
Lorena Ochoa	71.56	2000–01	30
Jenna Daniels	71.70	1999–00	34
