= 1999 NCAA Division I women's golf championship =

1999 NCAA Division I Women's Golf Championship
Tournament information
- Location: Tulsa, Oklahoma, U.S. 36.165906°N 96.013952°W
- Course: Tulsa Country Club

Statistics
- Par: 71
- Field: 19 teams

Champion
- Team: Duke (1st title); Individual: Grace Park, Arizona State
- Team: 895 (+8); Individual: 212 (−1)

Location map
- Location in the United States Location in Oklahoma

The 1999 NCAA Division I Women's Golf Championships were contested at the 18th annual NCAA-sanctioned golf tournament to determine the individual and team national champions of women's Division I collegiate golf in the United States.

The tournament was held at the Tulsa Country Club in Tulsa, Oklahoma.

Due to rain, only the first three rounds of play were completed.

Duke won the team championship, the Blue Devils' first.

Grace Park, from Arizona State, won the individual title.

== Individual results ==
=== Individual champion ===
- Grace Park, Arizona State (212, −1)

== Team leaderboard ==
Rank	Team	Score
1	Duke	895
T2	Arizona State (DC)	903
T2	Georgia	903
4	Arizona	904
5	Pepperdine	911
6	Tulsa	913
7	USC	914
8	Stanford	916
9	Texas	921
10	LSU	923
11	Ohio State	936
12	Oklahoma State	938
13	Florida State	940
14	South Carolina	941
T15	Auburn	944
T15	Furman	944
T17	San José State	946
T17	TCU	946
19	New Mexico State	961

- DC = Defending champion
- Debut appearance
