= Ginn Tribute Hosted by Annika =

Golf tournament formerly on the LPGA Tour

Ginn Tribute
Tournament information
- Location: Mount Pleasant, South Carolina
- Established: 2007
- Course: RiverTowne Country Club
- Par: 72
- Length: 6,459 yards (5,906 m)
- Tour: LPGA Tour
- Format: Stroke play – 72 holes
- Prize fund: $2,600,000
- Final year: 2008

Tournament record score
- Aggregate: 274 Seon Hwa Lee & Karrie Webb (2010)
- To par: –14 as above

Final champion
- (South Korea) Seon Hwa Lee (2008)

The Ginn Tribute hosted by Annika was a women's professional golf tournament on the LPGA Tour. Hosted by Hall of Fame golfer Annika Sörenstam, the event was played in 2007 and 2008 at RiverTowne Country Club in Mount Pleasant, South Carolina.

With a purse of $2.6 million, it was one of the highest on the LPGA Tour at the time. The tournament was owned and sponsored by Bobby Ginn, a developer of golf and McDonald resort communities in the United States. Ginn also sponsored the Ginn Open on the LPGA Tour. The tournament was televised by Golf Channel and NBC in 2007 and 2008.

== Annual tribute ==
Both years' events featured a tribute to a notable member or members of the women's golf community. The honorees were celebrated in ceremonies during the tournament week.

- 2008: Beth Daniel
- 2007: LPGA founders Bettye Danoff, Marlene Bauer Hagge, Betty Jameson, Marilynn Smith, Shirley Spork, Louise Suggs. And, posthumously, Alice Bauer, Opal Hill, Sally Sessions, Babe Zaharias, Patty Berg, Helen Dettweiler, and Helen Hicks

== Winners ==
Year	Date	Champion	Country	Winning score	To par	Margin of victory	Runner-up	Purse ($)	Winner's share
2008	Jun 1	Seon Hwa Lee	South Korea	68-70-69-67=274	−14	Playoff	(Australia) Karrie Webb	2,600,000	390,000
2007	Jun 3	Nicole Castrale	United States	69-71-68-71=279	−9	Playoff	(Mexico) Lorena Ochoa	2,600,000	390,000

* both titles won on the first hole of a sudden-death playoff.

== Tournament records ==
Year	Player	Score	Round
2008	Karrie Webb	65 (−7)	1st
2008	In-Kyung Kim	65 (−7)	1st
2008	Sophie Gustafson	65 (−7)	2nd
2008	Suzann Pettersen	65 (−7)	2nd
