= 2000 NCAA Division I women's golf championship =

2000 NCAA Division I Women's Golf Championship
Tournament information
- Location: Corvallis, Oregon, U.S. 44.568907°N 123.248132°W
- Course: Trysting Tree Golf Course

Statistics
- Par: 71 (284)
- Field: 24 teams

Champion
- Team: Arizona (2nd title); Individual: Jenna Daniels, Arizona
- Team: 1,175 (+21); Individual: 287 (+3)

Location map
- Location in the United States Location in Oregon

The 2000 NCAA Division I Women's Golf Championships were contested at the 19th annual NCAA-sanctioned golf tournament to determine the individual and team national champions of women's Division I collegiate golf in the United States.

The tournament was held at the Trysting Tree Golf Course in Corvallis, Oregon.

Arizona won the team championship, the Wildcats' second.

Jenna Daniels, also from Arizona, won the individual title.

== Individual results ==
=== Individual champion ===
- Jenna Daniels, Arizona (287, +3)

== Team leaderboard ==
Rank	Team	Score
1	Arizona	1,175
2	Stanford	1,196
3	Texas	1,198
4	USC	1,199
5	Tennessee	1,206
6	Auburn	1,210
7	Georgia	1,211
8	Pepperdine	1,213
9	Purdue	1,215
10	LSU	1,216
T11	Arizona State	1,217
T11	New Mexico State	1,217
T11	Oregon	1,217
14	Duke (DC)	1,218
15	San José State	1,225
16	Tulsa	1,227
17	Wake Forest	1,228
18	Florida	1,230
19	Nebraska	1,239
T20	Michigan State	1,240
T20	Ohio State	1,240
T20	TCU	1,240
23	Oklahoma	1,243
24	Northwestern	1,247

- DC = Defending champion
- Debut appearance
