= 1991 NCAA women's golf championship =

1991 NCAA Women's Golf Championship
Tournament information
- Location: Columbus, Ohio, U.S. 40.031886°N 83.0523498°W
- Course: Ohio State University Golf Club

Statistics
- Par: 73 (292)
- Field: 17 teams

Champion
- Team: UCLA (1st title); Individual: Annika Sörenstam, Arizona
- Team: 1,197 (+29); Individual: 290 (−2)

Location map
- Location in the United States Location in Ohio

The 1991 NCAA Women's Golf Championships were contested at the tenth annual NCAA-sanctioned golf tournament to determine the individual and team national champions of women's collegiate golf in the United States. Until 1996, the NCAA would hold just one annual women's golf championship for all programs across Division I, Division II, and Division III.

The tournament was held at the Ohio State University Golf Club in Columbus, Ohio.

UCLA won the team championship, the Bruins' first. UCLA defeated San Jose State in a sudden-death playoff tie-breaker, a first for a women's NCAA championship.

Future multi-LPGA major champion Annika Sörenstam, from Arizona, won the individual title.

== Individual results ==
=== Individual champion ===
- Annika Sorenstam, Arizona (290, −2)

== Team leaderboard ==
| Rank | Team | Score |
|---|---|---|
| T1 | UCLA† | 1,197 |
| T1 | San José State | 1,197 |
| 3 | Arizona | 1,212 |
| 4 | South Florida | 1,217 |
| 5 | Georgia | 1,222 |
| 6 | Stanford | 1,224 |
| 7 | Texas | 1,232 |
| 8 | Lamar | 1,233 |
| 9 | Tulsa | 1,235 |
| 10 | Kentucky | 1,237 |
| 11 | New Mexico State | 1,240 |
| 12 | SMU | 1,244 |
| 13 | Duke | 1,245 |
| 14 | Florida State | 1,255 |
| 15 | Florida | 1,260 |
| 16 | Iowa | 1,276 |
| 17 | TCU | 1,278 |

- † = Won tie-breaker
- Defending champion Arizona State did not qualify.
- Debut appearance
