= Jenna Daniels =

American professional golfer (born 1978)

Personal information
- Full name: Jennifer Lynn Daniels
- Nationality: United States
- Born: May 16, 1978 (age 48) San Diego, California, U.S.
- Height: 5 ft 5 in (165 cm)
- Spouse: Todd McCorkle

Career
- Sport: Golf
- College: University of Arizona
- Turned professional: 2000
- Former tour: LPGA Tour

Best results in LPGA major championships
- Chevron Championship: DNP
- Women's PGA C'ship: T52: 2002
- U.S. Women's Open: T37: 2002, 2004
- du Maurier Classic: DNP
- Women's British Open: CUT: 2004

Achievements and awards
- Honda Sports Award for golf: 2000

Jennifer Lynn Daniels (born May 16, 1978) is an American professional golfer. Daniels is best known for her success at the University of Arizona, where she led the Arizona Wildcats women's golf to an NCAA Division I women's golf championship title in 2000 and won the individual championship the same year. She later competed on the LPGA Tour from 2000 to 2007.

== Early life and education ==
Daniels was born in San Diego, California. She attended Bonita Vista High School, where she excelled in both golf and volleyball, earning multiple athletic honors. Upon graduation in 1996, went to play golf at the University of Arizona.

== Collage career ==
Daniels played for the University of Arizona from 1996 to 2000. She had a standout career, earning three All-America honors and 10 top-10 finishes. Her senior season in 2000 was notable. Daniels won the 2000 NCAA Division I women's golf championship individual title and led her team to a 21-stroke victory over Stanford University for the team title. She was awarded 1999 Honda Sports Award.

== Professional career ==
Daniels turned professional in 2000 and joined the LPGA Tour. During the 2002 U.S. Women's Open, Daniels could be seen on the second round T7.

Daniels retired from professional golf in 2007.

== Personal life ==
Daniels married University of Arizona coach, Todd McCorkle.

== Legacy ==
Daniels is remembered as one of the most accomplished players in Arizona Wildcats history and as a key contributor to the program's success during the late 1990s and early 2000s.

Achievement	Details
NCAA titles	2000 NCAA team title, Two additional Top 10 finishes
National Player of the Year	Awarded in 2000
Pac-10 titles	1998 Pac-10 champion, 2000 runner-up
National ranking	Ranked No. 1 in 2000
All-American honors	Two-time first-team All-American
All-Conference honors	Two-time first-team all-conference
Regional wins	Won 1999 NCAA West Regional
Senior year performance	Never finished below 15th in tournaments
Arizona Hall of Fame induction	Inducted as a Wildcat

== See also ==
- List of Pac-12 Conference champions
