= 1996 NCAA Division I women's golf championship =

1996 NCAA Division I Women's Golf Championship
Tournament information
- Location: La Quinta, California, U.S. 34.079294°N 118.450218°W
- Courses: La Quinta Resort & Club, Dunes course

Statistics
- Par: 72 (288)
- Field: 18 teams

Champion
- Team: Arizona (1st title); Individual: Marisa Baena, Arizona
- Team: 1,240† (+88); Individual: 296 (+8)

Location map
- Location in the United States Location in California

The 1996 NCAA Division I Women's Golf Championships were contested at the 15th annual NCAA-sanctioned golf tournament to determine the individual and team national champions of women's Division I collegiate golf in the United States.

This was the first championship held exclusively for Division I programs. A separate combined championship for Division II and Division III programs was also held for the first time this year, held in Allendale, Michigan and won by Methodist.

The tournament was held at the Dunes course of La Quinta Resort & Club in La Quinta, California.

Arizona won the team championship, the Wildcats' first. Arizona defeated San Jose State in a sudden-death playoff to win the title.

Marisa Baena, from Arizona, won the individual title.

== Individual results ==
=== Individual champion ===
- Marisa Baena, Arizona (296, +8)

== Team leaderboard ==
Rank	Team	Score
T1	Arizona†	1,240
T1	San José State	1,240
3	Texas	1,241
4	UCLA	1,243
5	Stanford	1,248
6	Arizona State (DC)	1,255
7	Duke	1,260
8	LSU	1,262
9	Florida	1,265
10	Tulsa	1,275
11	Wake Forest	1,277
12	Texas Tech	1,288
13	Furman	1,293
14	South Carolina	1,295
T15	New Mexico State	1,302
T15	Central Florida	1,302
17	New Mexico	1,308
18	Auburn	1,309

- † = Won tie-breaker
- DC = Defending champion
- Debut appearance
