= 1998 NCAA Division I women's golf championship =

1998 NCAA Division I Women's Golf Championship
Tournament information
- Location: Madison, Wisconsin, U.S. 43.023°N 89.545°W
- Course: University Ridge Golf Course

Statistics
- Par: 72 (288)
- Field: 19 teams

Champion
- Team: Arizona State (6th title); Individual: Jennifer Rosales, USC
- Team: 1,155 (+18); Individual: 279 (−9)

Location map
- Location in the United States Location in Wisconsin

The 1998 NCAA Division I Women's Golf Championships were contested at the 17th annual NCAA-sanctioned golf tournament to determine the individual and team national champions of women's Division I collegiate golf in the United States.

The tournament was held at the University Ridge Golf Course, near Madison, Wisconsin.

Defending champions Arizona State won the team championship, the Sun Devils' sixth title and fifth in six years.

Jennifer Rosales, from USC, won the individual title.

== Individual results ==
=== Individual champion ===
- Jennifer Rosales, USC (279, −9)

== Team leaderboard ==
| Rank | Team | Score |
|---|---|---|
| 1 | Arizona State (DC) | 1,155 |
| 2 | Florida | 1,173 |
| 3 | Arizona | 1,174 |
| 4 | Duke | 1,179 |
| 5 | LSU | 1,187 |
| 6 | Tulsa | 1,188 |
| 7 | USC | 1,193 |
| T8 | New Mexico | 1,199 |
| T8 | Stanford | 1,199 |
| T10 | Georgia | 1,201 |
| T10 | Texas | 1,201 |
| 12 | Ohio State | 1,208 |
| 13 | Indiana | 1,209 |
| 14 | Oregon | 1,213 |
| 15 | North Carolina | 1,214 |
| 16 | Oregon State | 1,225 |
| 17 | New Mexico State | 1,226 |
| 18 | Washington | 1,229 |
| 19 | Auburn | 1,231 |

- † = Won tie-breaker
- DC = Defending champion
- Debut appearance
