= 1997 NCAA Division I women's golf championship =

1997 NCAA Division I Women's Golf Championship
Tournament information
- Location: Columbus, Ohio, U.S. 40.031886°N 83.0523498°W
- Course: Ohio State University Golf Club

Statistics
- Par: 72 (288)
- Field: 18 teams

Champion
- Team: Arizona State (5th title); Individual: Heather Bowie, Texas
- Team: 1,178 (+26); Individual: 285 (−3)

Location map
- Location in the United States Location in Ohio

The 1997 NCAA Division I Women's Golf Championships were contested at the 16th annual NCAA-sanctioned golf tournament to determine the individual and team national champions of women's Division I collegiate golf in the United States.

The tournament was held at the Ohio State University Golf Club in Columbus, Ohio.

Arizona State won the team championship, the Sun Devils' fifth title and fourth in five years.

Heather Bowie, from Texas, won the individual title.

== Individual results ==
=== Individual champion ===
- Heather Bowie, Texas (285, −3)

== Team leaderboard ==
Rank	Team	Score
1	Arizona State	1,178
2	San José State	1,180
3	Arizona	1,190
4	Stanford	1,191
5	UCLA	1,192
6	Tennessee	1,197
7	Oregon	1,200
T8	Ohio State	1,202
T8	Tulsa	1,202
10	Florida	1,208
11	Wake Forest	1,210
12	TCU	1,219
13	Auburn	1,221
14	Campbell	1,226
15	New Mexico State	1,228
16	Furman	1,229
17	Texas A&M	1,235
18	Washington	1,267

- † = Won tie-breaker
- DC = Defending champion
- Debut appearance
