= Mikaela Parmlid =

Swedish professional golfer (born 1980)

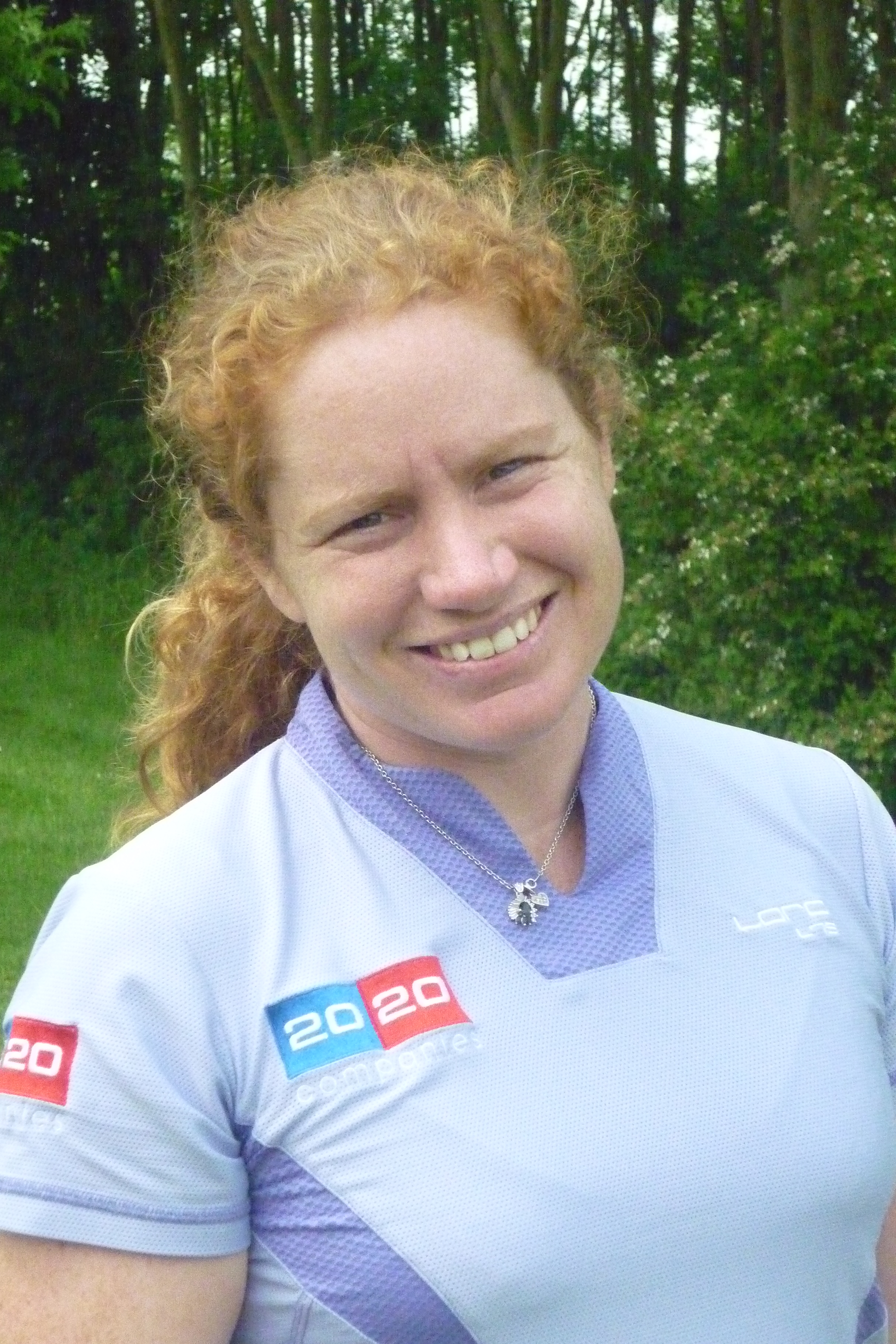
- Parmlid in 2012

Personal information
- Full name: Mikaela Mercédés Parmlid
- Nationality: Sweden
- Born: 22 September 1980 (age 46) Gothenburg, Sweden
- Height: 5 ft 7 in (1.70 m)

Career
- Sport: Golf
- College: University of Southern California
- Turned professional: 2003
- Former tours: LPGA Tour (2004–2010); LET (2011–2014)
- Professional wins: 2

Best results in LPGA major championships
- Chevron Championship: CUT: 2010
- Women's PGA C'ship: T54: 2006
- U.S. Women's Open: CUT: 2009
- Women's British Open: T36: 2013
- Evian Championship: DNP

Achievements and awards
- Honda Sports Award: 2003
- PGA of Sweden Future Fund Award: 2004
- WGCA Players Hall of Fame: 2013

Mikaela Parmlid (born 22 September 1980) is a Swedish professional golfer. She played on the LPGA Tour 2004–10 and the Ladies European Tour 2011–14. She was runner-up in the 2012 UNIQA Ladies Golf Open, the 2013 Open de España Femenino, and the 2014 International Crown. As an amateur, she won the 2001 European Ladies' Team Championship and was the 2003 NCAA Championship team and individual champion, and received the Honda Sports Award as the top woman collegiate golfer.

== Early life ==
In 1980, Parmlid was born in Gothenburg, Sweden. She was educated at Göteborgs Högre Samskola and Chaparral High in Scottsdale, Arizona. In 1997 she won the Swedish High School Championship, and she was the 1998 Nordic Junior Champion and the 1998 Teen Tour Champion. In 1999 she was the low amateur at the Chrysler Open, an LET event, and she was the low amateur at the Compaq Open, also an LET event, for four consecutive years 1999–2002.

== Amateur career ==
Parmlid was an economics major at University of Southern California 1999–2003 and played with the USC Trojans women's golf team. She was a member of the 2003 NCAA Championship Team and won the NCAA individual championship, after which she and her team was invited to the White House to meet George W. Bush. She won five collegiate tournaments in total and received the 2003 Honda Sports Award, as the top woman collegiate golfer. She was inducted into the WGCA Players Hall of Fame in 2013.

Parmlid was part of the Swedish National Team and won the 2001 European Ladies' Team Championship in Spain, and won silver at the next installment 2003 in Frankfurt, losing the final to Spain 4.5–2.5. In 2002, she finished 10th in the European Ladies Amateur at Kristianstad Golf Club. Her team finished 8th at the 2002 Espirito Santo Trophy in Malaysia.

== Professional career ==
In 2003, Parmlid turned professional. She earned her card for the 2004 LPGA Tour at Q-School. Parmlid made her first major cut at the 2006 LPGA Championship where she opened with a round of 69 and finished tied 54th. Parmlid recorded an LPGA career-best tie for eighth at the Jamie Farr Owens Corning Classic in 2009 where she also carded a career-low 62 (-9) in the third round.

In 2011, Parmlid joined the Ladies European Tour and enjoyed two successful seasons in 2012 and 2013. In 2012, she finished runner-up at the UNIQA Ladies Golf Open behind Caroline Hedwall, tied third at the ISPS Handa Ladies British Masters, and tied fourth at the Deutsche Bank Ladies Swiss Open. A win proving elusive, in 2013, her last season on the LET, she matched her career-best result as runner-up at the Open de España Femenino, a stroke behind Lee-Anne Pace. She finished 12th in the season rankings, as the top Swedish player.

In the 2013 Women's British Open at the Old Course at St Andrews Parmlid shot two opening rounds of 69 to sit in solo 7th place heading into the weekend, but eventually she succumbed to the windy conditions and finished tied for 36th.

Parmlid won the Gothenburg stop on the Swedish Golf Tour, the Delsjö Ladies Open, in 2013 and defended her title in 2014.

Parmlid retired from tour following the 2013 season. Eligible to play for Sweden in the 2014 International Crown, she made a brief comeback, and played the tournament six months pregnant. Her team, with Anna Nordqvist, Caroline Hedwall and Pernilla Lindberg, finished second behind Spain.

== Awards and honors ==
- In 2003, Parmlid was selected for the Honda Sports Award in the golf category, bestowed to the top female collegiate golfer.
- In 2013, she was inducted into the Women's Golf Coaches Association Players Hall of Fame.

== Amateur wins ==
- 1997 Swedish High School champion
- 1998 Nordic Junior champion
- 1998 Teen Tour champion
- 2002 Peg Barnard Collegiate champion
- 2003 NCAA team and individual champion

== Professional wins (2) ==
=== Nordea Tour wins (2) ===
No.	Date	Tournament	Winning score	To par	Margin of victory	Runner-up
1	16 Jun 2013	Delsjö Ladies Open	73-74-67=214	−2	3 strokes	(Sweden) Lina Boqvist
2	19 Jun 2014	Delsjö Ladies Open	72-72-69=213	E	Playoff	(Sweden) Emma Westin

== Results in LPGA majors ==
Results not in chronological order.

Tournament	2004	2005	2006	2007	2008	2009	2010	2011	2012	2013
ANA Inspiration							CUT			
U.S. Women's Open						CUT				
Women's PGA Championship			T54	CUT	CUT					
Women's British Open	CUT	CUT	CUT	CUT						T36

Did not play

CUT = missed the half-way cut
T= tied

== Team appearances ==
Amateur

- European Ladies' Team Championship (representing Sweden): 2001 (winners), 2003
- Espirito Santo Trophy (representing Sweden): 2002

Professional

- International Crown (representing Sweden): 2014
