= 1993 NCAA women's golf championship =

1993 NCAA Women's Golf Championship
Tournament information
- Location: Athens, Georgia, U.S. 33.915973°N 83.372005°W
- Course: University of Georgia Golf Course

Statistics
- Par: 73 (292)
- Field: 17 teams

Champion
- Team: Arizona State (2nd title); Individual: Charlotta Sörenstam, Texas
- Team: 1,187 (+19); Individual: 287 (−5)

Location map
- Location in the United States Location in Georgia

The 1993 NCAA Women's Golf Championships were contested at the 12th annual NCAA-sanctioned golf tournament to determine the individual and team national champions of women's collegiate golf in the United States. Until 1996, the NCAA would hold just one annual women's golf championship for all programs across Division I, Division II, and Division III.

The tournament was held again at the University of Georgia Golf Course in Athens, Georgia.

Arizona State won the team championship, the Sun Devils' second.

Charlotta Sörenstam, from Texas, won the individual title.

== Individual results ==
=== Individual champion ===
- Charlotta Sorenstam, Texas (287, −5)

== Team leaderboard ==
Rank	Team	Score
1	Arizona State	1,187
2	Texas	1,189
3	San José State (DC)	1,190
4	Georgia	1,197
5	USC	1,212
6	Furman	1,213
7	Wake Forest	1,215
T8	Indiana	1,218
T8	North Carolina	1,218
10	UCLA	1,224
11	Stanford	1,232
12	South Carolina	1,238
13	Oklahoma	1,240
14	Arizona	1,242
15	Ohio State	1,252
16	New Mexico	1,267
17	Oregon	1,293

- DC = Defending champion
- Debut appearance
