= 2005 in golf =

This article summarizes the highlights of professional and amateur golf in the year 2005.

== Men's professional golf ==
Major championships

- 7–10 April: Masters Tournament - Tiger Woods defeated fellow American Chris DiMarco at the first playoff hole to claim his 4th Masters title, and his 9th major. He temporarily returned to No. 1 in the Official World Golf Rankings. DiMarco becomes only the second player (after Tom Watson) to lose playoffs in consecutive major championships.
- 16–19 June: U.S. Open - Michael Campbell came from behind in the fourth round to win his first major with an even par score. He was the first New Zealander to win a major since Bob Charles won the British Open in 1963. Retief Goosen led after three rounds, but fell away badly on Sunday and tied for eleventh. Tiger Woods had a good final round to claim second place, but talk of his winning a Grand Slam was ended for another year.
- 14–17 July: The Open Championship - Tiger Woods led wire-to-wire at the historic Old Course at St Andrews and won his second Open Championship, and 10th major, by 5 strokes. Scottish favorite Colin Montgomerie closed within a shot at one point on Sunday and finished on his own in second, his best ever result at The Open Championship. The Golden Bear, Jack Nicklaus, had a historic farewell as he retired from professional golf on Friday, July 15, after missing the cut. Woods became only the second golfer, after Jack Nicklaus, to win each major more than once.
- 11–15 August: PGA Championship - Phil Mickelson won his second major championship, taking the PGA at Baltusrol Golf Club by scoring a -4 276. Thomas Bjørn and Steve Elkington both tied for second with -3. The tournament had to be completed on Monday due to bad weather: this was the first time that a Monday finish occurred at the PGA since 1986.

World Golf Championships (individual events)

- 23–27 February: WGC-Accenture Match Play Championship - David Toms defeated fellow American Chris DiMarco 6&5 in the final.
- 18–21 August: WGC-NEC Invitational - Tiger Woods defeated Chris DiMarco by one stroke to win the tournament for the fourth time in his career.
- 6–9 October: WGC-American Express Championship - Tiger Woods beat John Daly in a playoff. It was his fourth win in the six stagings of this tournament.

Other leading PGA Tour events

- 24–27 March: The Players Championship - American Fred Funk picked up the biggest win of his career at the age of 48.
- 3–6 November: The Tour Championship - Bart Bryant, a 42-year-old who had come good in 2004 and 2005 after a difficult career, won by six strokes.

For a full list of PGA Tour results, see 2005 PGA Tour.

Other leading European Tour events

- 26–29 May: BMW Championship - Argentina's Ángel Cabrera picked up the most prestigious title of his career.
- 15–18 September: HSBC World Match Play Championship - Reigning U.S. Open champion Michael Campbell beat Paul McGinley to claim the richest prize in golf.
- 27–30 October: Volvo Masters - Paul McGinley of the Republic of Ireland won the tournament, and Colin Montgomerie finished ahead of Michael Campbell to top the 2005 European Tour Order or Merit.

For a full list of European Tour results, see 2005 European Tour

Tour money list / order of merit winners:

- PGA Tour - Tiger Woods topped the money list for the sixth time, with earnings of $10,628,024. Full list
- European Tour - Colin Montgomerie topped the Order of Merit for a record eighth time with earnings of €2,794,222.84. Full list
- Japan Golf Tour - Shingo Katayama topped the money list for the second consecutive year, winning 134,075,280 Yen. Full list
- Asian Tour - Thailand's Thaworn Wiratchant topped the order of merit with US$510,122, the first time a player had won over $500,000 in a season on the Asian Tour. Full list
- PGA Tour of Australasia - Adam Scott topped the money list with earnings of A$545,429

Full list

- Sunshine Tour - Charl Schwartzel of South Africa topped the 2004/05 order of merit with earnings of 1,635,850.44 South African Rand (full list). Schwartzel also topped the 2005/06 order of merit with earnings of 1,207,459.70 Rand.

Awards

- PGA Tour
  - Player of the Year/Jack Nicklaus Trophy - Tiger Woods won for the seventh time in his nine full seasons on Tour
  - Money winner/Arnold Palmer Award - Tiger Woods won for the sixth time
  - Vardon Trophy - Tiger Woods won for the sixth time with an adjusted scoring average of 68.66
  - Byron Nelson Award - Tiger Woods won for the sixth time with an adjusted scoring average of 68.66
  - Rookie of the year - Sean O'Hair won the John Deere Classic in his first full season on Tour
  - Comeback Player of the Year - Olin Browne won the Deutsche Bank Championship and qualified for the Tour Championship for the first time
- Champions Tour
  - Player of the Year - Dana Quigley also won the senior money title
  - Rookie of the Year - Jay Haas won twice in only 10 starts
  - Comeback Player of the Year - Peter Jacobsen won the Senior Players Championship
- Nationwide Tour
  - Player of the Year - Jason Gore won three consecutive starts and was promoted to the PGA Tour
- European Tour
  - Player of the Year - Michael Campbell - won the U.S. Open
  - Rookie of the Year - Gonzalo Fernández-Castaño

Team events

- 22–25 September: Seve Trophy - After conceding an early lead Great Britain & Ireland pulled level before the singles, and then dominated the singles matches to win 16½ to 11½ and retain the Trophy.
- 22–25 September: Presidents Cup - The match was all square going into the singles, but the USA pulled away to win 18½ to 15½.
- 17–20 November: WGC-World Cup - Third round leaders Wales, represented by Stephen Dodd and Bradley Dredge, were declared the winners after the final round was called off due to bad weather.

Other happenings

- 26 February: Former British Open champion Max Faulkner died.
- 6 March: Tiger Woods won the Ford Championship at Doral and returned to Number 1 in the Official World Golf Rankings, displacing Vijay Singh.
- 20 March: Vijay Singh's tied second-place finish at the Bay Hill Invitational restored him to Number 1 after just two weeks.
- 10 April: Tiger Woods became World Number 1 again after winning The Masters.
- 13 May: Tiger Woods' record breaking run of 142 consecutive cuts made on the PGA Tour came to an end at the EDS Byron Nelson Championship.
- 22 May: Vijay Singh started his third spell as World Number 1, reclaiming the position from Woods even though neither man played that weekend.
- 13 June: Tiger Woods and Vijay Singh exchanged places at World Number 1 for the last time, with Woods opening a substantial gap in the rankings by early July.
- 2 July: Tiger Woods became the first man to pass $50 million in career earnings on the PGA Tour.
- 4 December: Colin Montgomerie won the Hong Kong Open and became the first man to win 20 million Euros on the European Tour.

== Women's professional golf ==
LPGA majors

- 24–27 March: Kraft Nabisco Championship - Annika Sörenstam won by eight shots, claiming her eighth major title, and equalling Nancy Lopez's 27-year-old record of winning five consecutive LPGA starts.
- 9–12 June: LPGA Championship - Annika Sörenstam cruised to a three shot win to claim her second major of the year and ninth of her career. Fifteen-year-old Michelle Wie was runner-up.
- 23–26 June: U.S. Women's Open - South Korean Birdie Kim holes a 30-yard sand shot on the 72nd hole, punctuating her two-shot win over teenage amateurs Morgan Pressel and Brittany Lang. Kim, who scored her first and only LPGA tournament win, finished the event at 3-over-par 284. Sörenstam was never a factor, finishing nine shots back. Wie was in a three-way tie for the lead after three rounds, but ballooned to an 82 and finished tied with Sörenstam. Lorena Ochoa was at 3-over after 71 holes, but hit her tee shot into the water on the final hole and shot a quadruple-bogey 8.
- 28–31 July: Weetabix Women's British Open - Another South Korean who had no previous LPGA tournament wins, Jeong Jang, cruises to a four-stroke win over Sophie Gustafson. Wie finished in a tie for third in her last tournament of the year before returning to high school.

For a full list of LPGA Tour results click here.

Ladies European Tour major (in addition to the Women's British Open)

- 20–23 July: Evian Masters - Paula Creamer, an 18-year-old rookie pro on the LPGA tour, waltzed to an eight-stroke win over Wie and Ochoa.

Additional LPGA Tour event

- 30 June - 3 July: HSBC Women's World Match Play Championship - little known Colombian Marisa Baena beat Meena Lee of South Korea by one hole in the inaugural staging of this event.

Money list winners

- LPGA Tour - Annika Sörenstam topped the money list for the eighth time with earnings of $2,588,240. She won ten tournaments. final money list
- Ladies European Tour - Iben Tinning topped the money list with earnings of €204,672.62

Team events

- 11–13 February: Women's World Cup of Golf - Japan, represented by Ai Miyazato and Rui Kitada, won the inaugural staging of this event.
- 9–11 September: Solheim Cup - The USA overcame an early deficit to beat Europe 15.5-12.5 and reclaim the cup.

Other happenings

- 26 February: 15 year old Michelle Wie achieves her career best finish on the LPGA Tour, placing tied 2nd at the SBS Open at Turtle Bay.
- 22 May: 18 year old Paula Creamer became the youngest first time winner on the LPGA Tour since 1952 at the Sybase Classic presented by Lincoln Mercury.
- 5 October: Michelle Wie turned pro six days before her sixteenth birthday.
- 6 November: Annika Sörenstam becomes first professional golfer to win same tournament five-straight times at Mizuno Classic.

== Senior men's professional golf ==
Senior majors

- 26–29 May: Senior PGA Championship - Mike Reid won a three-man playoff to claim his first Champions Tour title.
- 7–10 July: Senior Players Championship - Peter Jacobsen won his second Champions Tour event and his second senior major.
- 21–24 July: Senior British Open - Tom Watson won his second Senior British Open and his fourth senior major.
- 28–31 July: U.S. Senior Open - Allen Doyle won his third senior major. Doyle, who started the final round nine shots out of the lead, shot a final-round 63, a course record which tied for the lowest round ever in the U.S. Senior Open, and saw the leaders come back to him. Doyle would win by one stroke. His final-round comeback is unprecedented in the history of the senior majors; in the mainstream majors, only Paul Lawrie's comeback from 10 shots down on the final day of the 1999 Open Championship surpasses this feat.
- 25–28 August: The Tradition - Loren Roberts defeated Dana Quigley on the second playoff hole to win his first senior major.

For a complete list of Champions Tour results see 2005 Champions Tour.

Money list winners

- Champions Tour - Dana Quigley topped the money list for the first time with earnings of $2,170,258. Full list
- European Seniors Tour - Sam Torrance topped the Order of Merit with earnings of €277,420.76.Full list

== Amateur golf ==
- 30 May–4 June: The Amateur Championship - Ireland's Brian McElhinney beat Scotland's John Gallagher 5 & 4 in the final.
- 1–4 June: NCAA Division I Men's Golf Championships - The University of Georgia took the team title and James Lepp of the University of Washington won the individual title.
- 11–16 July: U.S. Amateur Public Links- Clay Ogden of West Point, Utah won 1 up over Martin Ureta of Chile. In the quarterfinals, Ogden defeated 15-year-old Michelle Wie, who had become the first woman ever to qualify for a men's USGA championship.
- 1–7 August: U.S. Women's Amateur - 17-year-old Morgan Pressel of the United States defeated Maru Martinez from Venezuela and a senior at Auburn University, 9 & 8 in the final match to win the championship.
- 13–14 August: Walker Cup - The United States won for the first time since 1997. Great Britain and Ireland needed to win the 18th hole of the last match on the course to tie that match and the Cup, and thus retain the trophy, but did not do so.
- 24–28 August: U.S. Amateur - Edoardo Molinari became the first Italian to win the tournament.

== Tables of results ==
=== Overview ===
This table summarises all the results referred to above in date order.

Date	Tournament	Status or tour	Winner
11–13 Feb	Women's World Cup of Golf	Professional world team championship	Japan
23–27 Feb	WGC-Accenture Match Play Championship	World Golf Championships	David Toms
24–27 Mar	The Players Championship	PGA Tour	Fred Funk
24–27 Mar	Kraft Nabisco Championship	LPGA major	Annika Sörenstam
7–10 Apr	Masters Tournament	Men's major championship	Tiger Woods
26–29 May	BMW Championship	European Tour	Ángel Cabrera
26–29 May	Senior PGA Championship	Senior major	Mike Reid
30 May – 4 Jun	The Amateur Championship	Amateur men's individual tournament	Brian McElhinney
1–4 Jun	NCAA Division I Men's Golf Championships	U.S. college championship	team - Georgia individual James Lepp (Washington)
9–12 Jun	LPGA Championship	LPGA major	Annika Sörenstam
16–19 Jun	U.S. Open	Men's major championship	Michael Campbell
23–26 Jun	U.S. Women's Open	LPGA major	Birdie Kim
30 Jun – 3 Jul	HSBC Women's World Match Play Championship	LPGA Tour	Marisa Baena
7–10 Jul	Senior Players Championship	Senior major	Peter Jacobsen
11–16 Jul	U.S. Amateur Public Links	Amateur men's individual tournament	Clay Ogden
14–17 Jul	The Open Championship	Men's major championship	Tiger Woods
20–23 Jul	Evian Masters	Ladies European Tour major and LPGA Tour	Paula Creamer
21–24 Jul	Senior British Open	Senior major	Tom Watson
28–31 Jul	Women's British Open	LPGA and Ladies European Tour major	Jeong Jang
28–31 Jul	U.S. Senior Open	Senior major	Allen Doyle
1–7 Aug	U.S. Women's Amateur	Amateur women's individual tournament	Morgan Pressel
11–14 Aug	PGA Championship	Men's major championship	Phil Mickelson
13–14 Aug	Walker Cup	GB & Ireland v USA - men's amateur team	USA
18–21 Aug	WGC-NEC Invitational	World Golf Championships	Tiger Woods
24–28 Aug	U.S. Amateur	Amateur men's individual tournament	Edoardo Molinari
25–28 Aug	The Tradition	Senior major	Loren Roberts
9–11 Sep	Solheim Cup	US v Europe - women's professional	USA
15–18 Sep	HSBC World Match Play Championship	European Tour	Michael Campbell
22–25 Sep	Seve Trophy	GB & Ireland v Rest of Europe - men's professional	GB & Ireland
22–25 Sep	Presidents Cup	USA v International Team - men's professional	USA
6–9 Oct	WGC-American Express Championship	World Golf Championships	Tiger Woods
27–30 Oct	Volvo Masters	European Tour	Paul McGinley
3–6 Nov	The Tour Championship	PGA Tour	Bart Bryant
17–20 Nov	WGC-World Cup	World Golf Championships	Wales

The following biennial events will next be played in 2006: Curtis Cup; Eisenhower Trophy; Espirito Santo Trophy; Ryder Cup

== Movies ==
- The Greatest Game Ever Played
