= Lee Seon-hwa =

South Korean professional golfer (born 1986)

Lee Seon-hwa 이선화
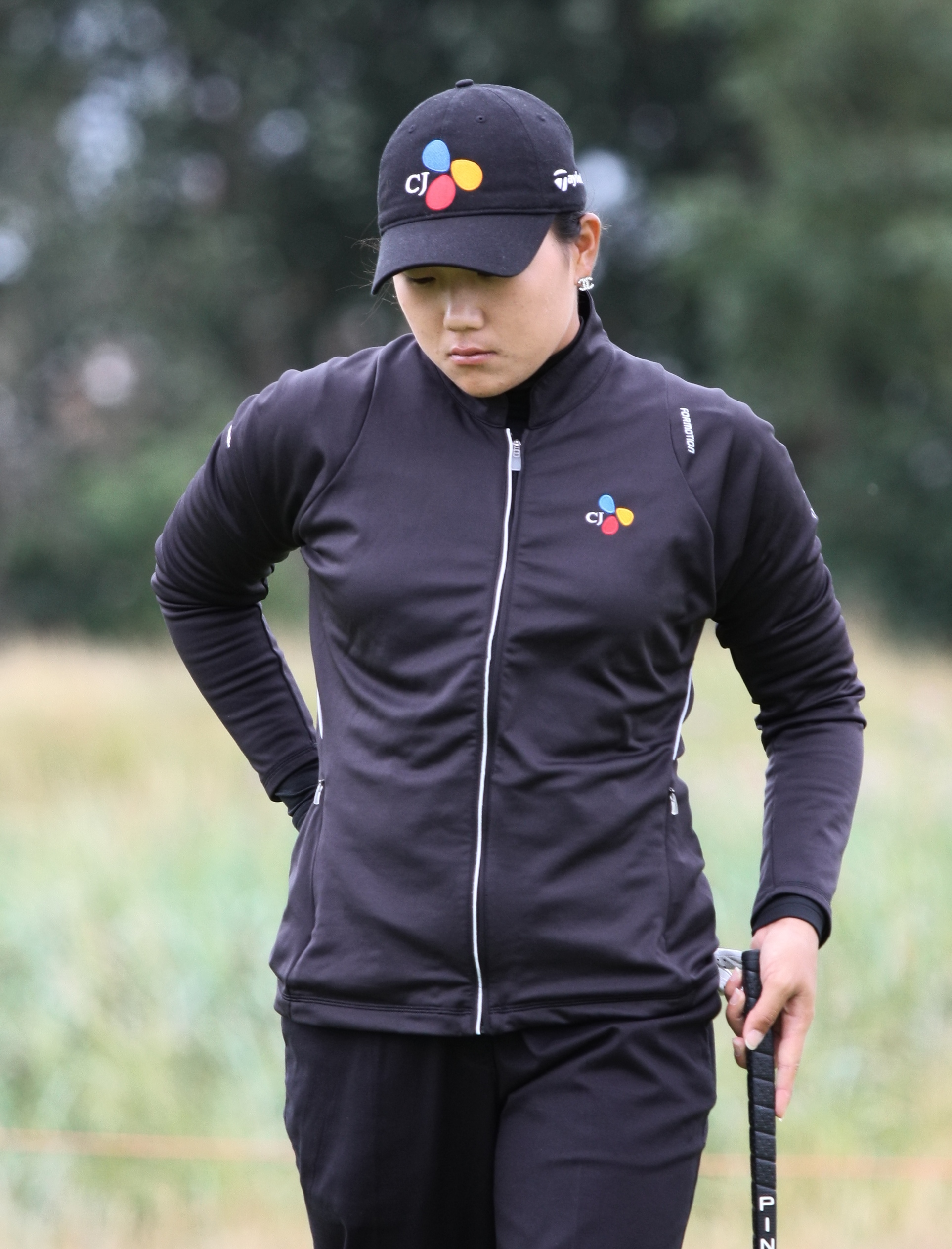
- Lee before 2009 Women's British Open

Personal information
- Nationality: South Korea
- Born: 10 February 1986 (age 40) Cheonan, Korea
- Height: 5 ft 5 in (1.65 m)

Career
- Sport: Golf
- Turned professional: 2000
- Former tours: LPGA of Korea Tour (joined 2000); LPGA Tour (2006–2015); Futures Tour (joined 2004)
- Professional wins: 8

Number of wins by tour
- LPGA Tour: 4
- LPGA of Korea Tour: 3
- Epson Tour: 1

Best results in LPGA major championships
- Chevron Championship: 5th: 2008
- Women's PGA C'ship: T10: 2008
- U.S. Women's Open: T25: 2007
- Women's British Open: T14: 2008
- Evian Championship: DNP

Achievements and awards
- Futures Tour Player of the Year: 2005
- LPGA Rookie of the Year: 2006

Lee Seon-hwa (Korean: 이선화; born 10 February 1986) is a South Korean professional golfer. She played on the LPGA of Korea Tour and the United States-based LPGA Tour.

== Career ==
In 1986, she was born in Cheonan, South Korea. She began playing golf at the age of 4.

She turned professional at 14, the youngest female to ever turn professional in Korea. She recorded three wins on the LPGA of Korea Tour between 2001 and 2006. She played on the Futures Tour in 2004 and 2005 and was successful, earning a promotion to the LPGA Tour.

In 2006, she played on the LPGA Tour. She won her first LPGA tournament in June at the ShopRite LPGA Classic. Overall, she won the LPGA Rookie of the Year award. She clinched the award on 25 September 2006 after competing in 24 tournaments and finishing in the top 10 six times, including one win. She was the first rookie to win on Tour in 2006.

In 2007, she notched her second LPGA Tour win at the HSBC Women's World Match Play Championship, defeating Japanese star Ai Miyazato 2&1 in the final match, to take home the $500,000 first place check.

== Awards and honors ==
- In 2005, Lee was named Futures Tour Player of the Year.
- In 2006, Lee won the LPGA Rookie of the Year award.

== Professional wins (8) ==
=== LPGA Tour wins (4) ===
No.	Date	Tournament	Winning score	Margin of victory	Runner(s)-up
1	4 Jun 2006	ShopRite LPGA Classic	−16 (65-69-63=197)	3 strokes	(South Korea) Jeong Jang (Sweden) Annika Sörenstam (United States) Sherri Steinhauer
2	22 Jul 2007	HSBC Women's World Match Play Championship	2 & 1		(Japan) Ai Miyazato
3	1 Jun 2008	Ginn Tribute	−14 (68-70-69-67=274)	Playoff	(Australia) Karrie Webb
4	6 Jul 2008	P&G Beauty NW Arkansas Championship	−15 (64-69-68=201)	1 stroke	(South Korea) Meena Lee (United States) Jane Park

LPGA Tour playoff record (1–1)

No.	Year	Tournament	Opponent	Result
1	2006	Fields Open in Hawaii	(South Korea) Meena Lee	Lost to birdie on third extra hole
2	2008	Ginn Tribute	(Australia) Karrie Webb	Won with par on first extra hole

=== Futures Tour wins (1) ===
- 2005 (1) Albany Futures Pro Golf Classic

=== LPGA of Korea Tour wins (3) ===
- 2001 (1) McSquare Championship
- 2003 (1) Himart Championship
- 2006 (1) Hite Championship

== Results in LPGA majors ==
Tournament	2004	2005	2006	2007	2008	2009	2010	2011	2012	2013
Kraft Nabisco Championship			T19	CUT	5	T30	T56	T47	T49	CUT
LPGA Championship			T16	T36	T10	T39	T19	CUT	CUT	CUT
U.S. Women's Open	CUT		T49	T25	T27	WD	CUT	CUT	CUT	
Women's British Open			T61	CUT	T14	CUT	T62	CUT		
The Evian Championship ^										

^ The Evian Championship was added as a major in 2013.

Top 10
Did not play

CUT = missed the half-way cut
WD = withdrew
"T" = tied

== Team appearances ==
Professional

- Lexus Cup (representing Asia team): 2006 (winners), 2007 (winners), 2008
