= Texas Longhorns women's golf =

NCAA golf program

- Founded: 1974
- University: University of Texas at Austin
- Conference: SEC
- Athletic director: Chris Del Conte
- Head coach: Ryan Murphy (10th season)
- Location: Austin, Texas
- Course: University of Texas Golf Club; Par: 72; Yards: 6,278
- Nickname: Longhorns
- Colors: Burnt Orange and White

NCAA individual champions
- Deborah Petrizzi (1978 AIAW); Charlotta Sörenstam (1993); Heather Bowie (1997); Farah O'Keefe (2026)

NCAA runner-up
- 1982 (AIAW), 1993, 2002

NCAA match play
- 2019, 2021, 2023, 2025, 2026

NCAA Championship appearances
- 1983, 1984, 1987, 1988, 1989, 1990, 1991, 1992, 1993, 1994, 1995, 1996, 1998, 1999, 2000, 2001, 2002, 2003, 2004, 2008, 2009, 2010, 2012, 2013, 2016, 2017, 2018, 2019, 2021, 2022, 2023, 2024, 2025, 2026

Conference champions
- SWC; 1984, 1987, 1988, 1989, 1990, 1991, 1993, 1994, 1995, 1996 Big 12; 1997, 2004, 2011, 2017, 2018, 2019, 2022, 2024

Individual conference champions
- SWC; Nancy Ledbetter (1984); Sue Ginter (1986); Kate Golden (1987); Michiko Hattori (1988, 1989); Jamie Fischer (1991); Jenny Turner (1993); Nadine Ash (1994); Kelli Kuehne (1996) Big 12; Heather Bowie (1997); Madison Pressel (2011); Agathe Laisné (2019)

The Texas Longhorns women's golf team represents the University of Texas at Austin in NCAA Division I intercollegiate women's golf competition. The Longhorns competed in the Big 12 Conference through the 2024 season and moved to the Southeastern Conference (SEC) on July 1, 2024.

The Longhorns have been to the NCAA Championship 32 times, seventh overall, and finished as the runner-up, or tied for runner-up, twice, in 1993 and 2002. As of 2024, they have finished in the top five on ten occasions, most recently in 2023 (t-5th) and 2021 (t-5th). In 2019, Texas won its first NCAA Regional in school history and was the stroke play medalist at the NCAA Championship.

Texas women have won three individual championships. In 1978, Deborah Petrizzi won the AIAW national intercollegiate individual golf championship; and Charlotta Sörenstam and Heather Bowie won in 1993 and 1997 respectively. Former players Betsy Rawls and Sherri Steinhauer went on to win eight and two LPGA major championships respectively, with Rawls being inducted into the World Golf Hall of Fame.

== Yearly record ==
=== AIAW ===
Texas competed in the Association for Intercollegiate Athletics for Women championships from 1975 to 1982.

Season	Coach	State	National
1975	Pat Weis		4th
1976	Pat Weis	2nd	14th
1977	Pat Weis	1st	8th
1978	Pat Weis	3rd	T-3rd
1979	Pat Weis	4th	14th
1980	Pat Weis	1st	8th
1981	Pat Weis	3rd	7th
1982	Pat Weis	3rd	2nd

=== NCAA ===
Texas has competed in NCAA since 1983.

Season	Coach	Conference	NCAA
Southwest Conference
1983	Pat Weis	4th	15th
1984	Pat Weis	1st	11th
1985	Pat Weis	3rd	
1986	Pat Weis	2nd	
1987	Pat Weis	1st	17th
1988	Pat Weis	1st	7th
1989	Pat Weis	1st	T-10th
1990	Pat Weis	1st	T-15th
1991	Pat Weis	1st	7th
1992	Pat Weis	2nd	6th
1993	Pat Weis	1st	2nd
1994	Susan Watkins	1st	5th
1995	Susan Watkins	1st	T-9th
1996	Susan Watkins	1st	3rd
Big 12 Conference
1997	Susan Watkins	1st	
1998	Susan Watkins	2nd	T-10th
1999	Susan Watkins	2nd	9th
2000	Susan Watkins	T-4th	3rd
2001	Susan Watkins	2nd	3rd
2002	Susan Watkins	3rd	T-2nd
2003	Susan Watkins	3rd	3rd
2004	Susan Watkins	1st	T-6th
2005	Susan Watkins	2nd	
2006	Susan Watkins	7th	
2007	Susan Watkins	10th	
2008	Martha Richards	3rd	T-17th
2009	Martha Richards	6th	23rd
2010	Martha Richards	3rd	T-16th
2011	Martha Richards	1st	
2012	Martha Richards	2nd	T-13th
2013	Martha Richards	T-6th	21st
2014	Martha Richards	2nd	
2015	Ryan Murphy	6th	
2016	Ryan Murphy	2nd	23rd
2017	Ryan Murphy	1st	13th
2018	Ryan Murphy	1st	T-12th
2019	Ryan Murphy	1st	T-5th
2020	Ryan Murphy	Season canceled due to the COVID-19 pandemic	
2021	Ryan Murphy	5th	T-5th
2022	Ryan Murphy	1st	13th
2023	Ryan Murphy	7th	T-5th
2024	Ryan Murphy	1st	T-11th
Total		SWC: 10 Big 12: 8	0

== Individual champions ==
=== National ===
Year	Name
1978 (AIAW)	Deborah Petrizzi
1993	Charlotta Sörenstam
1997	Heather Bowie
2026	Farah O'Keefe

=== Conference ===
Southwest Conference
Year	Name
1984	Nancy Ledbetter
1986	Sue Ginter
1987	Kate Golden
1988	Michiko Hattori
1989	Michiko Hattori
1991	Jamie Fischer
1993	Jenny Turner
1994	Nadine Ash
1996	Kelli Kuehne

Big 12 Conference
Year	Name
1997	Heather Bowie
2011	Madison Pressel
2019	Agathe Laisné

== National honors ==
U.S. Women's Amateur champions
- 1939 – Betty Jameson
- 1940 – Betty Jameson
- 1967 – Mary Lou Dill
- 1985 – Michiko Hattori
- 1995 – Kelli Kuehne
- 1996 – Kelli Kuehne
- 2017 – Sophia Schubert

Women's Western Amateur champions
- 2002 – Janice Olivencia
- 2018 – Emilee Hoffman

Honda Broderick Award
- 1978 – Deborah Petrizzi
- 1990 – Michiko Hattori
- 1993 – Charlotta Sörenstam
- 1997 – Heather Bowie

Marilyn Smith Award
- 1991 – Michiko Hattori
- 1997 – Heather Bowie

== See also ==
- Texas Longhorns men's golf
