= 1994 NCAA women's golf championship =

1994 NCAA Women's Golf Championship
Tournament information
- Location: Eugene, Oregon, U.S. 44.064°N 123.087°W
- Course: Eugene Country Club

Statistics
- Par: 73 (292)
- Field: 18 teams

Champion
- Team: Arizona State (3rd title); Individual: Emilee Klein, Arizona State
- Team: 1,189 (+21); Individual: 286 (−6)

Location map
- Location in the United States Location in Oregon

The 1994 NCAA Women's Golf Championships were contested at the 13th annual NCAA-sanctioned golf tournament to determine the individual and team national champions of women's collegiate golf in the United States. Until 1996, the NCAA would hold just one annual women's golf championship for all programs across Division I, Division II, and Division III.

The tournament was held at the Eugene Country Club in Eugene, Oregon.

Defending champions Arizona State won the team championship, the Sun Devils' third.

Emilee Klein, from Arizona State, won the individual title.

== Individual results ==
=== Individual champion ===
- Emilee Klein, Arizona State (286, −6)

== Team leaderboard ==
Rank	Team	Score
1	Arizona State (DC)	1,189
2	USC	1,205
3	San José State	1,220
4	Duke	1,224
5	Texas	1,234
6	UCLA	1,236
7	Stanford	1,238
8	Wake Forest	1,240
9	Tulsa	1,243
10	Oklahoma State	1,247
11	Furman	1,251
12	Oklahoma	1,238
13	Tennessee	1,258
14	Oregon	1,263
15	Florida	1,266
16	North Carolina	1,268
17	Indiana	1,271
18	Florida State	1,272

- DC = Defending champion
- Debut appearance
