= Meena Lee =

South Korean professional golfer (born 1981)

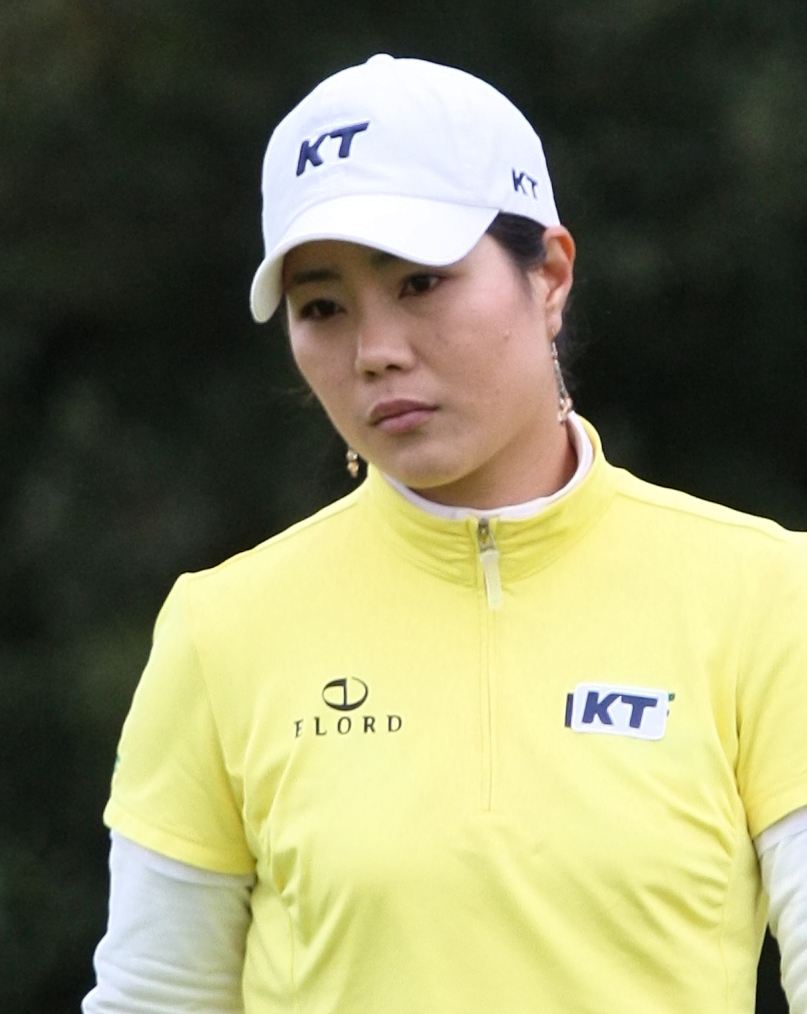
- Lee at the 2009 Women's British Open

Personal information
- Nationality: South Korea
- Born: 25 December 1981 (age 44) Jeonju, South Korea
- Height: 5 ft 6 in (1.68 m)

Career
- Sport: Golf
- College: Yong-In University
- Turned professional: 2002
- Former tours: LPGA of Korea Tour (joined 2002); LPGA Tour (2005–2016); Futures Tour (2004)
- Professional wins: 6

Number of wins by tour
- LPGA Tour: 2
- LPGA of Korea Tour: 4

Best results in LPGA major championships
- Chevron Championship: T29: 2006
- Women's PGA C'ship: T6: 2011
- U.S. Women's Open: T5: 2014
- Women's British Open: T11: 2013
- Evian Championship: T31: 2013

Meena Lee (Korean: 이미나; born 25 December 1981) is a South Korean professional golfer. She played on the LPGA of Korea Tour and the United States-based LPGA Tour.

== Early life and amateur career ==
in 1981, Lee was born in Jeonju, South Korea. She took up golf at the age of fourteen, which is unusually late for a future professional golfer, but just a few years later, in 2000, she became the Korean Amateur Champion.

== Professional career ==
In 2002, she turned professional one year before graduating from Yong-In University. She won three events on the LPGA of Korea Tour in her rookie season of 2002 and topped the money list. In 2003, she won one tournament and placed fifth on the money list.

In 2004, Lee played on the second-tier Futures Tour in the United States, finishing 23rd on the money list, but she was able to win an LPGA Tour card for 2005 by finishing tied for 25th at the LPGA Final Qualifying Tournament. She made a steady start to her rookie season and in July 2005 was a surprise finalist in the inaugural HSBC Women's World Match Play Championship, which she lost to Colombia's Marisa Baena by one hole. Two weeks later she won for the first time on the LPGA Tour at the BMO Financial Group Canadian Women's Open. On 25 February 2006, she won her second LPGA Tour title at the Fields Open in Hawaii.

== Professional wins (6) ==
=== LPGA Tour wins (2) ===
No.	Date	Tournament	Winning score	Margin of victory	Runner-up
1	17 Jul 2005	BMO Financial Group Canadian Women's Open	−9 (73-68-69-69=279)	1 stroke	(Australia) Katherine Hull
2	25 Feb 2006	Fields Open in Hawaii	−14 (69-68-65=202)	Playoff	(South Korea) Seon Hwa Lee

LPGA Tour playoff record (1–1)

No.	Year	Tournament	Opponent	Result
1	2006	Fields Open in Hawaii	(South Korea) Seon-Hwa Lee	Won with birdie on third extra hole
2	2006	LPGA Corning Classic	(South Korea) Hee-Won Han	Lost to par on fourth extra hole

=== KLPGA Tour (4) ===
- 2002 (3) SK EnClean Invitational, Hours Mall Invitational, Woori Stock Classic
- 2003 (1) Lakeside Open

== Results in LPGA majors ==
Results not in chronological order before 2015.

Tournament	2004	2005	2006	2007	2008	2009	2010	2011	2012	2013	2014	2015
ANA Inspiration			T29	CUT	T61	CUT	T56	CUT	CUT	T63	T55	T57
Women's PGA Championship		T20	T14	T46	CUT	CUT	T19	T6	CUT	CUT	T11	T53
U.S. Women's Open	T61			T46	74	T61	CUT	T21	T54	T31	T5	CUT
Women's British Open		CUT	CUT	T33	CUT	T42	T43	T37	CUT	T11	T21	CUT
The Evian Championship ^										T31	T61	CUT

Top 10
Did not play

CUT = missed the half-way cut
"T" = tied

=== Summary ===
Tournament	Wins	2nd	3rd	Top-5	Top-10	Top-25	Events	Cuts made
ANA Inspiration	0	0	0	0	0	0	10	6
Women's PGA Championship	0	0	0	0	1	5	11	7
U.S. Women's Open	0	0	0	1	1	2	10	8
Women's British Open	0	0	0	0	0	2	11	6
The Evian Championship	0	0	0	0	0	0	3	2
Totals	0	0	0	1	2	9	45	29

- Most consecutive cuts made – 10 (2013 U.S. Open – 2015 WPC)
- Longest streak of top-10s – 1 (twice)

== LPGA Tour career summary ==
Year	Tournaments played	Cuts made	Wins	2nd	3rd	Top 10s	Best finish	Earnings ($)	Money list rank	Scoring average	Scoring rank
2005	28	19	1	2	0	7	1	870,182	7	72.32	33
2006	28	26	1	1	0	5	1	645,350	19	72.07	38
2007	26	21	0	0	0	2	8	284,975	48	72.87	45
2008	30	26	0	1	0	4	2	553,090	32	72.13	45
2009	25	19	0	0	1	1	3	386,335	34	72.22	44
2010	23	21	0	0	0	2	5	357,097	33	71.53	21
2011	21	19	0	0	0	4	6	408,114	28	71.86	22
2012	26	22	0	1	0	2	T2	374,312	38	72.24	43
2013	26	20	0	0	0	2	4	324,362	45	72.26	56
2014	28	24	0	1	0	4	2	589,337	26	71.73	44
2015	22	12	0	0	0	0	T16	99,484	91	72.64	85
2016	10	3	0	0	0	0	T54	11,787	157	73.28	135

- official through 2016 season

== Team appearances ==
Professional

- Lexus Cup (representing Asia team): 2005, 2006 (winners), 2007 (winners)
- World Cup (representing South Korea): 2006
