= 1995 NCAA women's golf championship =

1995 NCAA Women's Golf Championship
Tournament information
- Location: Wilmington, North Carolina, U.S. 34.246835°N 77.810785°W
- Course: Country Club of Landfall

Statistics
- Par: 72 (288)
- Field: 18 teams

Champion
- Team: Arizona State (4th title); Individual: Kristel Mourgue d’Algue, Arizona State
- Team: 1,155 (+3); Individual: 283 (−5)

Location map
- Location in the United States Location in North Carolina

The 1995 NCAA Women's Golf Championships were contested at the 14th annual NCAA-sanctioned golf tournament to determine the individual and team national champions of women's collegiate golf in the United States.

This was the final year that the NCAA would hold just one annual women's golf championship for all programs across Division I, Division II, and Division III.

The tournament was held at the Country Club of Landfall in Wilmington, North Carolina.

Two-time defending champions Arizona State again won the team championship, the Sun Devils' fourth.

Kristel Mourgue d’Algue, from Arizona State, won the individual title.

== Individual results ==
=== Individual champion ===
- Kristel Mourgue d’Algue, Arizona State (283, −5)

== Team leaderboard ==
Rank	Team	Score
1	Arizona State (DC)	1,155
2	San José State	1,181
3	Wake Forest	1,185
4	Stanford	1,188
5	Indiana	1,194
6	Furman	1,195
7	UCLA	1,199
8	North Carolina	1,203
T9	South Carolina	1,204
T9	Texas	1,204
11	Duke	1,215
12	Arizona	1,224
13	Oregon	1,225
14	USC	1,231
15	New Mexico	1,232
T16	Oklahoma	1,234
T16	Washington	1,234
18	Georgia	1,235

- DC = Defending champion
- Debut appearance
