= New Mexico State University Golf Course =

- Interactive map of New Mexico State; University Golf Course
- 32.286°N 106.731°W

Club information
- Location: Las Cruces, New Mexico, U.S.
- Established: 1963; 63 years ago
- Type: Public
- Owner: New Mexico State University
- Operator: New Mexico State University
- Tota holes: 18
- Website: nmsugolf.com
- Designed by: Floyd Farley
- Par: 72
- Length: 7,078 yards
- Course rating: 72.7
- Slope rating: 129

The New Mexico State University Golf Course is an 18–hole golf course within the campus of New Mexico State University, in the city of Las Cruces, New Mexico. The golf course was established in 1963 and is opened to the public. It features 4 sets of tees for different skill levels and measures 7078 yards from the longest tees. The golf course has a slope rating of 129 and a 72.7 USGA rating. It is also the home of New Mexico State Aggies' men's and women's golf team.

Students of New Mexico State University's PGA GM™ program have the opportunity to use the facility for practice and play. The PGA Golf Management Program is offered only to few universities, and is the only program to be offered in New Mexico. It is the third in the nation to be endorsed by the PGA in 1987. The program is accredited by the Professional Golfers' Association of America (PGA), and administered by the College of Business, that offers the Bachelor of Business Administration, major in Marketing-PGA Golf Management.

== Cross country course ==
The facility serves as the cross country course for the New Mexico State Aggies men's and women's cross country teams. The 2017 WAC cross country championship was held on the course.
