= HSBC Women's World Match Play Championship =

Golf tournament

The HSBC Women's World Match Play Championship was an LPGA Tour golf tournament that was played from 2005 through 2007. It was first played from June 30 to July 3, 2005, at Hamilton Farm Golf Club in Gladstone, New Jersey. In 2007, the event moved to the Wykagyl Country Club in New Rochelle, New York.

In 2008, HSBC discontinued the event and began sponsoring a new event in Singapore: the HSBC Women's Champions, a stroke play event.

The title sponsor, HSBC, is a large banking group based in London, England.

== Selection process ==
In 2007 the 64-woman field was selected as follows:

1. The top-30 players on Rolex Rankings List through the U.S. Women's Open (July 2, 2007) who commit to play in the event. (Numbers 31 and higher on the Rolex Ranking List were not eligible even if one of the top 30 did not commit.)
2. The top-30 players on the Official Money List through the U.S. Women's Open (July 2, 2007), who commit to play in the event.
3. Two sponsor exemptions.
4. Only the number-one ranked player on the Ladies European Tour Order of Merit through the U.S. Women's Open (July 2, 2007), who commits to play in the event.
5. The defending champion, if not otherwise qualified.
6. Any spots remaining after the above criteria have been applied will be taken from the Official Money List through U.S. Women's Open (July 2, 2007), who commit to play in the event, to complete the field.

The closest equivalent event in men's professional golf is the WGC-Accenture Match Play Championship, which is also a 64-player 18-hole match play event. HSBC also sponsors the HSBC World Match Play Championship on the PGA Tour, a longer established sixteen-player thirty-six-hole event tournament played in the United Kingdom.

The tournament was last played from July 19 through July 22, 2007.

== Winners ==
Year	Champion	Country	Score	Runner-up	Tournament Location	Purse	Winner's Share
2007	Seon Hwa Lee	South Korea	2 and 1	Ai Miyazato	Wykagyl Country Club	$2,000,000	$500,000
2006	Brittany Lincicome	United States	3 and 2	Juli Inkster	Hamilton Farm Golf Club	$2,000,000	$500,000
2005	Marisa Baena	Colombia	1 up	Meena Lee	Hamilton Farm Golf Club	$2,000,000	$500,000
