= Heather Bowie Young =

American professional golfer (born 1975)

Personal information
- Nationality: United States
- Born: March 23, 1975 (age 51) Washington, D.C., U.S.
- Height: 5 ft 3 in (1.60 m)

Career
- Sport: Golf
- College: Arizona State University; University of Texas
- Turned professional: 1997
- Current tour: LPGA Tour (joined 2000)
- Former tour: Futures Tour (1998–1999)
- Professional wins: 1

Number of wins by tour
- LPGA Tour: 1

Best results in LPGA major championships
- Chevron Championship: T10: 2008
- Women's PGA C'ship: T6: 2000
- U.S. Women's Open: T13: 2005
- du Maurier Classic: T50: 2000
- Women's British Open: 3rd: 2004
- Evian Championship: CUT: 2013

Achievements and awards
- Honda Broderick Award: 1997

Heather Bowie Young (born March 23, 1975) is an American professional golfer who played on the LPGA Tour. She played under her maiden name, Heather Bowie, until her marriage in 2006, and is also referred to as Heather Young.

== Early life and amateur career ==
In 1975, Bowie was born in Washington, D.C.

She played college golf at Arizona State University, playing on two NCAA Women's Division I Championship teams in 1994 and 1995. She transferred to the University of Texas at Austin and won the NCAA Women's Division I Individual Championship in 1997.

== Professional career ==
In 1997, Bowie turned professional. She played on the Futures Tour in 1998 and 1999.

Bowie joined the LPGA Tour in 2000 and has won once on Tour in 2005.

Bowie also played on the U.S. team in the 2003 Solheim Cup.

== Awards and honors ==
- In 1995, Bowie won the Edith Cummings Munson Golf Award, given to the top female student-athlete for academic performance.
- In 1997, while at University of Texas, she was bestowed the Honda Broderick Award, best collegiate female athlete in a certain sport, in her case, golf.

== Professional wins (1) ==
=== LPGA Tour wins (1) ===
No.	Date	Tournament	Winning score	Margin of victory	Runner-up
1	Jul 10, 2005	Jamie Farr Owens Corning Classic	–10 (72-66-69-67=274)	Playoff	(South Korea) Gloria Park

LPGA Tour playoff record (1–0)

No.	Year	Tournament	Opponent(s)	Result
1	2005	Jamie Farr Owens Corning Classic	(South Korea) Gloria Park	Won with par on third extra hole

== Team appearances ==
Professional

- Solheim Cup (representing the United States): 2003
