= Marisa Baena =

Colombian professional golfer (born 1977)

Personal information
- Full name: Marisa Isabel Baena
- Nationality: Colombia
- Born: 1 June 1977 (age 49) Pereira, Colombia
- Height: 5 ft 4 in (1.63 m)
- Spouse: Juan Aristizabal (m.2005)

Career
- Sport: Golf
- College: University of Arizona
- Turned professional: 1998
- Former tour: LPGA Tour
- Professional wins: 1

Number of wins by tour
- LPGA Tour: 1

Best results in LPGA major championships
- Chevron Championship: T23: 1997
- Women's PGA C'ship: T16: 2005
- U.S. Women's Open: T19: 2001
- du Maurier Classic: T55: 2000
- Women's British Open: T32: 2001

Achievements and awards
- Honda Award: 1996

Marisa Isabel Baena (born 1 June 1977) is a Colombian professional golfer who plays on the U.S.-based LPGA Tour.

== Early life and amateur career ==
In 1977, Baena was born in Pereira, Colombia. She started playing golf at the age of six.

Baena attended the University of Arizona in the United States and had an outstanding amateur career, the highlights of which were claiming the individual NCAA title in 1996 and finishing at runner up at the U.S. Women's Amateur in the same year. In 1996, she won the Honda Award (now the Honda Sports Award) as the best female collegiate golfer in the nation.

== Professional career ==
She qualified for the LPGA Tour at her first attempt and had her rookie season in 1999, but she has not so far fully lived up to the promise of her amateur days. Her best finish in a stroke play tournament on the Tour is a tie for second place at the 2003 Jamie Farr Kroger Classic. In July 2005 she was the surprise winner of the first HSBC Women's World Match Play Championship, beating South Korea's Meena Lee by one hole in the final. She won $500,000, a three-year exemption on the LPGA Tour, and a gold horseshoe necklace.

She represented Team International in the inaugural Lexus Cup competition in 2005. She and her sister Christina represented Colombia in the 2006 Women's World Cup of Golf.

== Awards and honors ==
In 1996, Baena won the Honda Award in the golf category. This award is bestowed to the top female college golfer in the United States.

== Professional wins (1) ==
=== LPGA Tour wins (1) ===
No.	Date	Tournament	Winning score	Margin of victory	Runner-up
1	3 Jul 2005	HSBC Women's World Match Play Championship	1 up		(South Korea) Meena Lee

== Results in LPGA majors ==
Tournament	1996	1997	1998	1999	2000
Kraft Nabisco Championship		T23	CUT		
LPGA Championship					T56
U.S. Women's Open	T54		CUT		T54
du Maurier Classic					T55

Tournament	2001	2002	2003	2004	2005	2006	2007	2008	2009	2010
Kraft Nabisco Championship		T36		T62		T42	T37	T47	CUT	CUT
LPGA Championship	T54	CUT	T46	CUT	T16	T34	T69	T18	76	CUT
U.S. Women's Open	T19	CUT			CUT	CUT				
Women's British Open^	T32		CUT		CUT	T50				

^ The Women's British Open replaced the du Maurier Classic as an LPGA major in 2001.

Did not play

LA = low amateur
CUT = missed the half-way cut
"T" = tied

== Team appearances ==
Professional

- Lexus Cup (representing International team): 2005 (winners)
- World Cup (representing Colombia): 2006
