= South Florida Bulls golf =

University of South Florida sports team

- Founded: Men's: 1966; 60 years ago Women's: 1973; 53 years ago
- University: University of South Florida
- Conference: The American
- Athletic director: Michael Kelly
- Head coach: Men's: Steve Bradley (8th season); Women's: Erika Brennan (3rd season)
- Course: The Claw
- Nickname: Bulls
- Colors: Green and gold

NCAA runner-up
- Men: 1972 (DII), 1973 (DII)

NCAA match play
- Men: 2015

NCAA Championship appearances
- Men: 1969 (DII), 1971 (DII), 1972 (DII), 1973 (DII), 1987, 1996, 2012, 2014, 2015, 2016, 2017, 2018, 2019, 2021, 2022, 2025; Women: 1983, 1984, 1990, 1991, 2000, 2001, 2002, 2003, 2006, 2007, 2012

Conference champions
- Men: 1979, 1980, 1981, 1982, 1983, 1984, 1985, 1986, 1987, 1988, 1989, 2013, 2015, 2016, 2017, 2018, 2021, 2024; Women: 1996, 1998, 1999, 2000, 2003, 2012

The South Florida Bulls golf program represents the University of South Florida in the sport of golf. The program consists of separate men's and women's teams and competes in the American Conference within NCAA Division I. The Bulls men's golf team is coached by Steve Bradley and the women's team is coached by Erika Brennan. They host meets at The Claw golf course adjacent to USF's campus in Tampa, Florida.

== Men ==
The USF men's golf team was founded in 1966 as one of the "original seven" sports teams to be offered at USF. The team made it to the NCAA College Division Golf Championship in just the sixth year of its existence, and appeared in the tournament again in three of the next four years, finishing as the national runner-up in both 1972 and 1973. The Bulls joined NCAA Division I before the 1974 season and the Sun Belt Conference before the 1977 season, and beginning in 1979 they would win the next 11 conference titles in a row. They would not make their first appearance in the NCAA Division I Men's Golf Championship until 1987, finishing 17th in the country.

After their final Sun Belt title in 1989, the Bulls did not win another conference title until 2013, their final year in the Big East. After leaving the Big East for the American Athletic Conference (now the American Conference), the Bulls started to find success again. They qualified for the NCAA Championship following their first AAC title in 2015, finishing fifth in the nation, a program-best since joining Division I. Claudio Correa took sixth place in the individual category at the 2015 tournament, the best in USF history.

In addition to the 18 team conference titles, USF golfers have won 13 individual men's conference titles:

- Joe Hodge, 1980
- Drew Butler, 1981
- Ray Boone, 1982
- Ken Mattiace, 1983
- Dean Hiers, 1986
- Mark Turlington, 1988
- Ted Eilbeck, 1990
- Ryan Fricker, 2015
- Aksel Olsen, 2016
- Claudio Correa, 2017
- Albin Bergstrom, 2021
- Jake Peacock, 2024 & 2025

One USF men's golfer, Chase Koepka, has been inducted into the University of South Florida Athletic Hall of Fame.

== Women ==
USF's women's golf team began in 1973 in the Association for Intercollegiate Athletics for Women. They joined the NCAA after the AIAW disbanded in 1982, and reached the NCAA Division I Women's Golf Championship in their first year in the league. They have finished top 5 in the NCAA twice, taking 5th in 1984 and 4th in 1991. They have won six conference titles: 1996, 1998, 1999, 2000, 2003, and 2012. In addition, three Bulls have won individual conference championships:

- Anna Acker, 1990
- Susan Veasey, 1991
- Cecilia Hedlund, 1996

One USF women's golfer, Kelly Lagedrost, has been inducted into the University of South Florida Athletic Hall of Fame.

== See also ==
- University of South Florida
- South Florida Bulls
