= Oklahoma State Cowgirls golf =

- University: Oklahoma State University
- Conference: Big 12
- Head coach: Women's: Annie Young (1st season)
- Location: Stillwater, Oklahoma
- Course: Karsten Creek Golf Club; Par: 72; Yards: 7,449
- Nickname: Cowgirls
- Colors: Orange and black

NCAA individual champions
- Caroline Hedwall (2010)

NCAA runner-up
- 2004, 2021

NCAA match play
- 2021, 2026

NCAA Championship appearances
- 1982, 1986, 1987, 1988, 1989, 1990, 1992, 1994, 1999, 2001, 2002, 2003, 2004, 2005, 2006, 2007, 2008, 2009, 2010, 2013, 2016, 2021, 2022, 2023, 2024, 2025, 2026

Conference champions
- Big Eight; 1977, 1979, 1980, 1982, 1984, 1985, 1986, 1987, 1988, 1989, 1992, 1994, 1995, 1996 Big 12; 1999, 2001, 2002, 2003, 2005, 2008, 2009, 2013, 2016, 2021, 2023

Individual conference champions
- Big Eight; 1977, 1978, 1979, 1980, 1982, 1983, 1984, 1985, 1986, 1987, 1988, 1989, 1990, 1992, 1994, 1995 Big 12; 1999, 2001, 2002, 2004, 2005, 2008, 2010, 2015, 2016, 2022, 2023

The Oklahoma State Cowgirls women's golf team represents Oklahoma State University in the sport of golf. The Cowgirls compete in Division I of the National Collegiate Athletic Association (NCAA) in the Big 12 conference. They play their home matches at the Karsten Creek Golf Course near the university's Stillwater, Oklahoma campus, and are led by first–year head coach Annie Young.

In the 52-year history of the Oklahoma State women's golf program, the Cowgirls have claimed 25 conference championships in the Big Eight and Big 12 to go along with 27 individual conference champions. Oklahoma State has also made 27 NCAA Championship appearances, and won the individual NCAA championship with Caroline Hedwall in 2010.

== History ==
The Oklahoma State women's golf program began their first season in 1973 under coach Ann Pitts. It took only three years for Oklahoma State to earn their first Big Eight conference title in 1977, and one year later would make their first AIAW golf championship in 1978, finishing 23rd. In 1982, Oklahoma State would appear in the inaugural NCAA women's golf championship, where they would earn an impressive 3rd–place finish. Pitts would go onto lead the Cowgirl golf team for 28 years, amassing a total of 56 event wins and earning 15 conference championships across the Big Eight and Big 12.

Former Oklahoma State golfer Amy Weeks was hired as head coach in 2000. Under her leadership, the Cowgirls won three straight Big 12 titles in 2001, 2002 and 2003. In 2004, Oklahoma State finished 2nd at the NCAA Championship, only three strokes behind national champion UCLA.

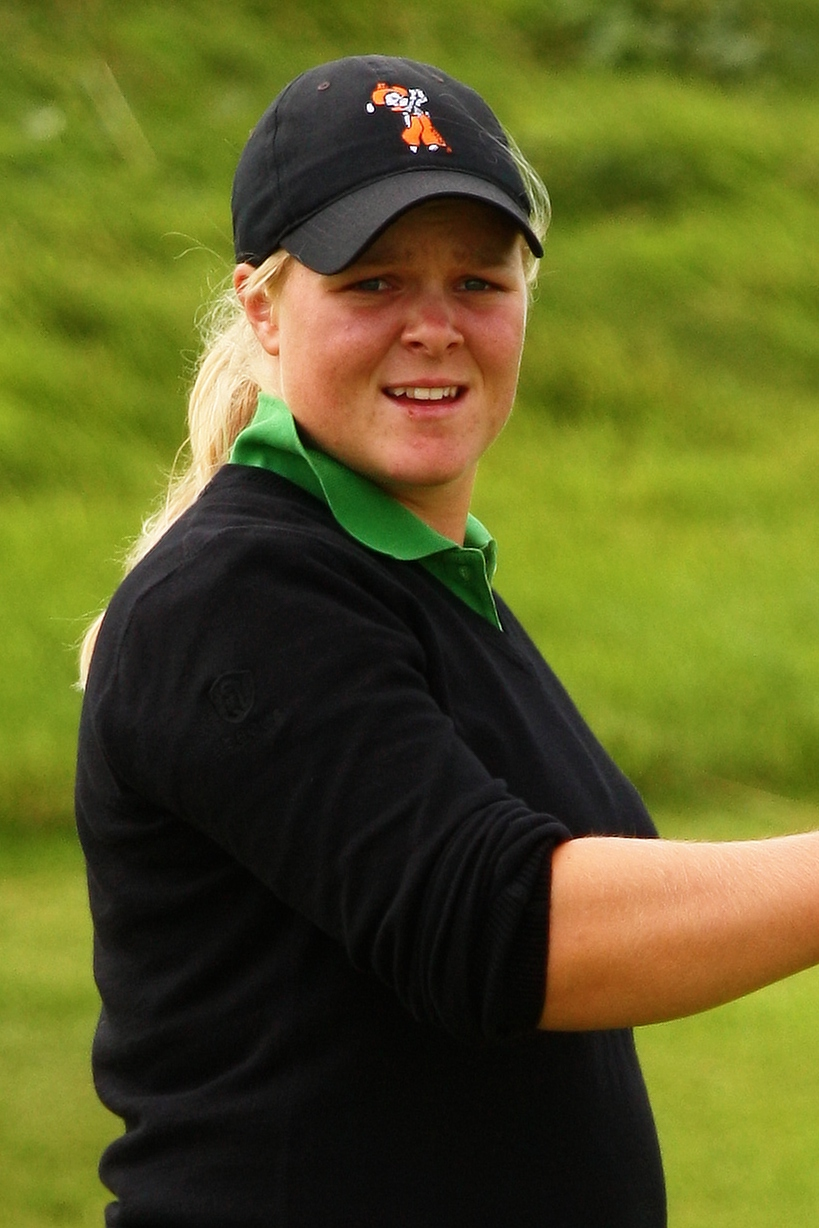
2010 NCAA Individual Champion, Caroline Hedwall

From 2004 to 2013, four different head coaches led Oklahoma Stats over nine seasons. Despite the lack of head coach stability, the Cowgirls continued to have conference and national success, winning another four Big 12 conference titles and making seven more NCAA Championship appearances. During this time, Caroline Hedwall won the program's first individual NCAA national title in 2010. Most notably, Alan Bratton, the current head coach of the Oklahoma State Cowboys golf team, led the Cowgirls for two seasons in 2011–12 and 2012–13.

Courtney Jones took over head coaching duties in 2013, but struggled to match the same success as her coaching successors, winning only one Big 12 title in 2016 and failing to reach the NCAA Championship in five of her six years. She was not retained following the 2018–19 season.

Greg Robertson was hired in 2019 and led the team for six seasons. Oklahoma State immediately found success under him, making it to the NCAA national championship match against Ole Miss in 2021, where they fell 4–1. Under Robertson, the Cowgirls made the NCAA Championship five years in a row and added two more Big 12 titles in 2021 and 2023, but were unable to maintain success at a national level. Following a 15th–place finish at the 2025 NCAA Championship, Robertson was fired. In addition to the leading Oklahoma State to two conference titles, he coached three Big 12 Player of the Year selections, two Big 12 individual champions, and a Big 12 Freshman of the Year. He was named the Central Region Coach of the Year in 2021 and Big 12 Coach of the Year in 2021 and 2023. Dating back to his time at Kent State, he had guided his teams to eight straight NCAA Championship appearances, a streak that ranked third in the country among all active head coaches at the time he was let go. Only ten schools qualified for the NCAA Championship each year over the last five years, as Oklahoma State did during his tenure, and Robertson guided the Cowgirls to five straight NCAA Championship appearances for the first time since 2010. He remains one of three head coaches in history to have reached match play in the NCAA Championship with two different schools.

Former Cowgirl golf coach Annie Young was promoted to head coach following Robertson's firing in 2025. Young previously coached at Oklahoma State from 2008–11, leading the Cowgirls to a Big 12 title in 2009. In 2026, Oklahoma State advanced to match play for the first time since 2021, falling to Arkansas in the quarterfinal round.

== LPGA Tour professionals ==
12 former Oklahoma State Cowgirl golfers have qualified as members of the LPGA Tour, headlined by Caroline Hedwall, the 2010 individual NCAA champion, 2018 Chevron Championship winner Pernilla Lindberg and 1986 Chevron Championship runner-up Val Skinner.

== Karsten Creek Golf Course ==
Karsten Creek serves as the home course of the Oklahoma State University men's and women's golf teams. The Tom Fazio layout was named Golf Digest's "Best New Public Course" and served as the host site for the NCAA Men's Championship in 2003, 2011, and 2018. Travel & Leisure Golf magazine ranked Karsten Creek as the best college course in the country.

== See also ==
- Oklahoma State Cowboys and Cowgirls
- Oklahoma State men's golf
