= List of Kent State University alumni =

This list includes people who have graduated from or otherwise attended Kent State University at the main campus in Kent, Ohio, or one of its seven regional campuses in northeastern Ohio. Kent State counted over 270,000 living alumni as of 2023.

| Name | Notability | Degree (year) | Category |
|---|---|---|---|
| Matthew Alec | Jazz saxophonist, composer, producer, and bandleader | B.A. Music, concentration in classical saxophone (2007) | Music |
| Raj Aggarwal | Author and educator in international business | M.B.A. Operations Management (1970); D.B.A. Finance and International Business (1975) | Business |
| Diana Al-Hadid | Contemporary artist | B.F.A. Sculpture (2003); B.A. Art History (2003) | Arts |
| Timothy App | Contemporary painter | B.F.A. Painting (1970) | Arts |
| Willie Asbury | Professional football player in the National Football League 1966–1968 | | Athletics - football |
| Eugene Baker | Professional football player in the National Football League | | Athletics - football |
| John Balistreri | Ceramic artist | M.F.A. Ceramics (1988) | Arts |
| Joe Barbee | Professional football player in the American Football League | | Athletics - football |
| Tom Batiuk | Comic strip author of Funky Winkerbean and Crankshaft | B.F.A. (1969) | Literary |
| J. Ross Baughman | 1978 Pulitzer Prize-winning photojournalist, editor, writer, educator | B.A. Journalism (1975) | Journalism |
| Stephen "Suede" Baum | Fashion designer, contestant on Project Runway and Project Runway: All Stars | B.A. Fashion Design (1993) | Fashion design |
| Brian Bell | Professional football player in the National Football League | | Athletics - football |
| Kaitlin Bennett | Gun rights advocate, anti-abortion activist, and social media personality | B.A. Biology (2018) | Politics |
| Bertice Berry | Sociologist, author, lecturer, comedian, educator, and former talk show host | Ph.D. | Education |
| Kaitlyn Black | Television and theater actress | B.A. Theater (2005) | Film and television |
| Blitz the Ambassador (Samuel Bazawule) | Ghanaian-American hip-hop artist | | Music/entertainment |
| Bob Borden | Writer and frequent contributor, Late Show with David Letterman | Journalism (1995) | Entertainment |
| Brannon Braga^ | Producer and screenwriter for several Star Trek series and films, 24, and Flashforward | Transferred | Film and television |
| Regina Brett | Columnist with The Plain Dealer | Bachelor's in Journalism | Journalism |
| Cedric Brown | Professional football player in the National Football League 1976–1984 | | Athletics - football |
| Emmanuel Burriss | Professional baseball player in Major League Baseball as a second baseman | | Athletics - baseball |
| Debra Byrd | Backup vocalist for Barry Manilow; vocal coach for American Idol and Canadian Idol | | Music |
| Steve Byrne | Comedian | | Entertainment |
| Curt Cacioppo | Contemporary classical music composer and pianist | B.A. Piano Performance | Music |
| Alan Canfora | Political activist; one of nine students wounded during the Kent State shootings | | Politics |
| John Caparulo | Comedian | Bachelor's (1998) | Entertainment |
| Michael Capellas | Current CEO of First Data Corporation; former president/CEO of Hewlett-Packard, WorldCom, Compaq, and Serena Software | B.B.A | Business |
| Vincent J. Cardinal | Playwright and director | Bachelor's in English and Education | Theater |
| Drew Carey | Actor, comedian, host of TV's The Price Is Right | Did not graduate | Film and television |
| Robert Carothers | President of the University of Rhode Island since 1991 | Ph.D. (1969) | Education |
| Chris Carpenter | Professional baseball player in Major League Baseball | | Athletics - baseball |
| Gerald Casale | Founding member of Devo | | Music |
| Andrew Chafin | Professional baseball player in Major League Baseball as a pitcher | | Athletics - baseball |
| Dain Clay | Professional baseball player in Major League Baseball | | Athletics - baseball |
| Robert E. Cook | Democratic politician who served as a common pleas judge, district court of appeals judge, and in the United States House of Representatives | Bachelor's (1947) | Politics |
| Jim Corrigall | Professional football player in the Canadian Football League as a defensive end, member of Canadian Football Hall of Fame, former KSU head football coach | | Athletics - football |
| Carol Costello | Anchor and reporter for CNN | B.A. Journalism (2004) | Journalism |
| Kyle Craven | Internet celebrity from the Bad Luck Brian meme | B.S. Construction Management (2012) | Entertainment |
| Joshua Cribbs | Professional football player in the NFL | B.A. Communication Studies (2010) | Athletics - football |
| Ben Curtis | Professional golfer, 2003 British Open champion | | Athletics - golf |
| Jose Davis | Professional football player in the NFL and the Arena Football League | | Athletics - football |
| Wayne Dawson | Television newscaster at WJW in Cleveland | B.A. Journalism (1979) | Journalism |
| John de Lancie | Actor | B.A. (1971) | Film and television |
| Sarah Deal | First female Marine selected for Naval aviation training; first female aviator in the Marine Corps | B.S. Aerospace Flight Technology (1992) | Aeronautics |
| Bryan DeCorso | Canadian professional golfer | B.S. Business Administration (1995) | Athletics - golf |
| John Dennis | Radio talk show personality and television sportscaster | (1974) | Journalism |
| G. William Domhoff | Author and research professor in psychology and sociology | M.A. Psychology (1959) | Science |
| Stephen R. Donaldson | Author of The Chronicles of Thomas Covenant, the Unbeliever series | M.A. English (1971) | Literary |
| Jan Dowling | Head women's golf coach at the University of Florida, Canadian former professional golfer | B.S. Leisure Studies (2002) | Athletics - golf |
| Joyce Dyer | Writer | Ph.D. | Literary |
| Joe Ebanks | Professional poker player in the World Series of Poker | Dropped out | Entertainment |
| Julian Edelman | Professional football player in the NFL | Business Management | Athletics - football |
| John Edwards | Professional basketball player in the NBA and NBDL | | Athletics - basketball |
| Abram Elam | Professional football player in the NFL | | Athletics - football |
| Donald Erb | Composer | B.S. Composition (1950) | |
| John Ferguson | Organist, composer, and teacher | M.M. | Music |
| Colin Ferrell | Professional football player in the NFL | | Athletics - football |
| John Filo | Pulitzer Prize-winning photographer | | Arts |
| Al Fisher | 2008 Mid-American Conference Men's Basketball Player of the Year | | Athletics - basketball |
| Quinton Flynn | Voice actor | | Film and television |
| Brenda Frese | Head coach for the Maryland Terrapins women's basketball program | Master's in Athletic Administration (1995) | Athletics - women's basketball |
| Angela Funovits | Mentalist/illusionist, star of NBC's Phenomenon | | Film and television |
| Dae Gak (Robert Genthner) | Zen master | Ph.D. Clinical Psychology (1973) | Science |
| Nari Gandhi | Indian architect in organic architecture | | Architecture |
| Antonio Gates | Professional football player in the NFL as a tight end | | Athletics - football |
| Michael Glaser | Poet Laureate of Maryland, 2004–2009 | M.A. Ph.D. | Literary |
| Dick Goddard | TV meteorologist at WJW in Cleveland, author, and cartoonist | B.F.A. (1960) | Journalism |
| Dan Goodspeed | Professional football player in the NFL, XFL, and Canadian Football League | | Athletics - football |
| Anthony Gregorc | Educational theorist; developer of the mind styles model | M.S., Ph.D. | Education |
| Matt Guerrier | Professional baseball player in Major League Baseball as a pitcher | | Athletics - baseball |
| Mike Gulan | Former professional baseball in Major League Baseball as a third-baseman | | Athletics - baseball |
| Michael M. Gunter | Educator and scholar on the Kurdish people | Ph.D. International Relations (1972) | Education |
| Alaina Reed Hall | Television and film actress on Sesame Street and 227 | | Film and television |
| Arsenio Hall | Talk show host | B.A. Speech (1977) | Film and television |
| Jimmy Hall | Professional basketball player in Israeli National League | | Athletics - basketball |
| Bob Hallen | Former professional football player in the NFL | | Athletics - football |
| Ken Hammond | Former leader of SDS, activist in the 1960s and 70s during the Kent State shootings | B.A. (1985) | Politics |
| Andy Harmon | Professional football player in the NFL | | Athletics - football |
| Wayne Alan Harold | Filmmaker | B.A. Telecommunications (1988) | Film and television |
| James Harrison | Professional football player in the NFL as a linebacker | | Athletics - football |
| Steve Harvey | Television personality; host of The Steve Harvey Morning Show and Family Feud | | Entertainment |
| Dirk Hayhurst | Professional baseball player in Major League Baseball, currently for the Toronto Blue Jays as a pitcher | Communications (did not graduate) | Athletics - baseball |
| Robert Hemenway | Former chancellor at the University of Kentucky and the University of Kansas | Ph.D. English (1966) | Education |
| Anne Hendershott | Author and sociologist | Ph.D. Sociology | Politics, literary |
| Dustin Hermanson | Professional baseball player in Major League Baseball as a pitcher | | Athletics - baseball |
| Rick Hilles | Poet and educator | B.A. M.L.S. | Literary |
| Keno Hills | Professional football player in the NFL | | Athletics - football |
| Nancy Hollister | Former Ohio state representative, lieutenant governor, and briefly served as Ohio's first female governor | | Politics |
| Dave Holmes | Winner of ESPN's Dream Job | | Journalism |
| Lou Holtz | College football coach, television sportscaster | B.S. History (1959) | Athletics - football |
| Mike Hovancsek | Instrumentalist, founder of multicultural experimental music group Pointless Orchestra | B.S. Psychology | Music |
| Mackenzie Hughes | Professional golfer in the PGA Tour | Business Management (2012) | Athletics - golf |
| Chrissie Hynde | Lead singer for The Pretenders | Did not graduate | Music |
| Kyle Jackson | professional baseball player in Banana Ball | Sports psychology, minor in theater performance | Athletics - baseball |
| Jennifer Lyn Jackson | Playboy Playmate, April 1989 | | Business and finance |
| Reginald Jagers III | Olympic athlete, left handed discus world record holder | | Athletics - track and field |
| Van Jakes | Professional football player in the NFL | | Athletics - football |
| Thomas Jefferson | Bronze medalist at the 1984 Summer Olympics | | Athletics - track and field |
| Angela Johnson | Author and illustrator | Did not graduate; received honorary doctorate (2007) | Literary |
| Emma Johnson | National Pro Fastpitch pitcher | B.B.A. Accounting & Finance (2015) | Athletics - softball |
| Jeff Johnson | Cleveland City Council member and Ohio state senator | Communications | Politics |
| Daniel Johnston | Singer-songwriter and artist | | Music |
| Marvin Jones | Professional basketball player in the Israeli Basketball Premier League | | Athletics - basketball |
| Michael Keaton | Actor | Dropped out | Film and television |
| Don King | Boxing promoter | Dropped out | Entertainment |
| Ishmaa'ily Kitchen | Professional football player in the NFL | | Athletics - football |
| Joe Kotys | Member of the 1948 United States Men's Gymnastics Olympic team; NCAA national champion on individual events in 1949, 1950, and 1951 | | Athletics - gymnastics |
| Allison Krause | One of the four students killed during the Kent State shootings in 1970 | Was studying art history | Politics |
| Allen Kukovich | State representative in Pennsylvania from the Democratic Party | Bachelor's (1969) | Politics |
| Jack Lambert | Professional football player in the NFL as a linebacker and a member of the Pro Football Hall of Fame | | Athletics - football |
| Charlie Laster | Attorney, former minority leader of the Oklahoma Senate. | | Athletics - football |
| Eric Lauer | Professional baseball player in Major League Baseball | B.B.A. Business (2016) | Athletics - baseball |
| Mike Lebowitz | Attorney, pioneer in military free speech, military law | Journalism (1999) | Law |
| Jack Lengyel | College football coach and athletics administrator; coached at Marshall University following the crash in 1970 that killed most of the team | Master's (1962) | Athletics - football |
| Bob Lewis | Founding member of Devo | B.A. Anthropology (1970) | Music |
| Robert Longhurst | Sculptor | | Arts |
| Jill Macoska | Scientist and academic | B.A. Physical Anthropology (1978) | Science |
| Peter Makuck | Author, poet, and critic | Ph.D. American Literature | Literary |
| Tony Martino | Professional football player in the CFL, 1988–2002 | | Athletics - football |
| John Matsko | Coach in the National Football League | | Athletics - football |
| Sarah Matthews | Deputy press secretary for President Trump | B.A. Public Relations (2017) | Politics |
| David W. May | U.S. Air Force brigadier general, adjutant general of Wisconsin | B.A. Music (1993) | Military |
| Betty-Jean Maycock | Member of 1960 United States women's gymnastics team | B.A. (1964) | Athletics - gymnastics |
| Hal McCoy | Beat writer for the Cincinnati Reds, Baseball Hall of Fame member | | Journalism |
| Ben McDaniels | Assistant coach in the NFL | | Athletics - football |
| Mike "Scooter" McGruder | Professional football player in the NFL, 1989–1997 | | Athletics - football |
| Nigel McGuinness (Steven Haworth) | Professional wrestler, currently with WWE | | Sports/entertainment |
| Joe McKeown | Women's college basketball coach | | Athletics - basketball |
| Jay McNeil | Former professional football player in the CFL, 1994–2007 | | Athletics - football |
| Gene Michael | Professional baseball player, manager, and scout in Major League Baseball | | Athletics - baseball |
| Pete Mikolajewski | Professional football player in the AFL | | Athletics - football |
| Earl K. Miller | Neuroscientist, professor of Neuroscience at MIT | B.A. Psychology (1985) | Science |
| Jeffrey Miller | One of the four students killed in the Kent State shootings in 1970; subject of famous photograph | Was studying psychology | Politics |
| Travis Miller | Professional baseball player in Major League Baseball as a pitcher | | Athletics - baseball |
| Jon Mills | Canadian professional golfer | | Athletics - golf |
| Dan Moldea | Author and investigative reporter specializing in the reporting of organized crime and political corruption | Post-graduate work in History | Politics |
| Carl Monday | Investigative reporter for WOIO in Cleveland | Bachelor's (1973) | Journalism |
| Mark Mothersbaugh | Founding member of Devo | Did not graduate | Music |
| Daniel Muir | Professional football player in the NFL | | Athletics - football |
| Thurman Munson | Professional baseball player in Major League Baseball with the New York Yankees, Rookie of the Year, and MVP winner | | Athletics - baseball |
| Rico Murray | Professional football player in the NFL | | Athletics - football |
| Richard Myers | Filmmaker, artist | B.F.A. (1959); M.A. (1961) | Film and television |
| Don Nehlen | Former head football coach at Bowling Green State University and West Virginia University; member of College Football Hall of Fame | M.A. (1966) | Athletics - football |
| Don Nottingham | Professional football player in the NFL | B.S. Marketing (1971) | Athletics - football |
| Terrence O'Donnell | Justice of the Supreme Court of Ohio | B.S. Political Science (1968) | Politics |
| Carl Oglesby | Political activist; president of Students for a Democratic Society 1965–1966 | Dropped out | Politics |
| Mwatabu S. Okantah | Poet | B.A. English, African Studies (1976) | Literary |
| Luke Owens | Professional football player in the NFL, 1957–1965 | | Athletics - football |
| Augustus Parrish | Professional football player in the NFL | | Athletics - football |
| Vipal J. Patel | Acting US attorney for the Southern District of Ohio | M.S. Integrated Life Sciences | Pre-med |
| Rick Peckham | Play-by-play announcer for the Tampa Bay Lightning of the National Hockey League | B.A. Telecommunications (1977) | Journalism |
| Taylor Pendrith | Professional golfer on the PGA Tour | B.S. Sport Administration (2014) | Athletics - golf |
| George Petak | Wisconsin politician | | Politics |
| Dan Peters | College basketball head and assistant coach | B.S. Social Studies (1976) | Athletics - basketball |
| Lyndsay Petruny | Sports anchor, sideline reporter, sports producer, and television host | Broadcast Journalism (2008) | Entertainment, media |
| Jeff Phelps | Sportscaster and radio host | Bachelor's (1982) | Entertainment, media |
| Dav Pilkey | Children's author best known for Captain Underpants | | Literary |
| Charles J. Pilliod, Jr. | Former U.S. ambassador to Mexico; former CEO of Goodyear Tire and Rubber Company | Dropped out (1941) | Business, politics |
| Gary Pinkel | Former head football coach at the University of Missouri | | Athletics - football |
| Mike Polk | Comedian, actor | Communications (2002) | Entertainment |
| C.J. Prentiss | Former minority leader and member of the Ohio State Senate in the Democratic Party | Post-graduate certificate in Administration | Politics |
| Bill Randle | DJ, lawyer, and university professor | Master's in Journalism | Radio |
| Nate Reinking | Professional basketball player in the British Basketball League, 1996–2012; member of the Great Britain national basketball team 2005–2012 | Graduated (1997) | Athletics - basketball |
| James Renner | Film producer, reporter | | Film and television, Journalism |
| Jeff Richmond | Composer and producer; wrote for 30 Rock and Saturday Night Live | Graduated | Film and television |
| Alice Ripley | Tony Award-winning actress and singer | (1986) | Theater |
| Robert Risko | Caricature artist | | Arts |
| Rich Rollins | Former professional baseball third-baseman in Major League Baseball 1961–1970 | | Athletics - baseball |
| Cynthia Rylant | Children's author | M.L.S. | Literary |
| Nick Saban | College football and NFL head coach | (1973) | Athletics - football |
| Abdul Salaam (Larry Faulk) | Professional football player in the NFL, 1976–1983 | | Athletics - football |
| O. J. Santiago | Professional football player in the NFL | | Athletics - football |
| Sandra Scheuer | One of the four students killed during the Kent State shootings in 1970; she was walking to class at the time | Was studying speech therapy | Politics |
| William Knox Schroeder | One of the four students killed during the Kent State shootings in 1970; he was walking to class at the time | Was studying psychology | Politics |
| Connie Schultz | Columnist for The Plain Dealer, 2005 Pulitzer Prize winner | Journalism (1979) | Journalism |
| David Sedaris | Author, humorist | Dropped out (1977) | Literary |
| Travis Shaw | Professional baseball player in Major League Baseball as an infielder | | Athletics - baseball |
| Wayne Shaw | Professional football player in the CFL | | Athletics - football |
| Justine Siegal | First female coach in Major League Baseball | M.A. Sport Studies | Athletics - baseball |
| Karl Smesko | Head coach in women's college basketball | B.A. Communications (1993) | Athletics - basketball |
| Lowell C. Smith | President of Nichols College | B.S. Business Administration | Business |
| Patricia Haynes Smith | Member of the Louisiana House of Representatives from Baton Rouge | B.S. Education | Politics |
| Andy Sonnanstine | Professional baseball player in Major League Baseball as a pitcher | | Athletics - baseball |
| Timothy Starks | Professional football player in the NFL | | Athletics - football |
| Paul Steigerwald | Sports announcer for the Pittsburgh Penguins of the National Hockey League | | Journalism |
| Nancy Stockall | Professor of Early Childhood Studies and Special Education at Sam Houston State University | Ph.D. 1993 | Education |
| Steve Stone | Professional baseball player in Major League Baseball as a pitcher, winner of the Cy Young Award, sportscaster | | Athletics - baseball |
| Scott Stricklin | Professional baseball player, head coach for the Kent State baseball team 2005–2013 | B.A. Marketing (1995) | Athletics - baseball |
| Larry Sudbrook | College baseball coach at St. Bonaventure | B.A. (1978) | Athletics - baseball |
| Betty Sutton | Former congresswoman for Ohio's 13th congressional district and judge of Ohio's 9th District Court of Appeals | Political Science | Politics |
| Emilia Sykes | Congresswoman for Ohio's 13th congressional district and former Ohio House minority leader | B.A. Psychology | Politics |
| Dean Sylvester | Professional ice hockey player in the National Hockey League 1995–2001 | | Athletics - ice hockey |
| Jeff Tabaka | Professional baseball player in Major League Baseball as a pitcher, 1994–2001 | | Athletics - baseball |
| Nicholas Talbott | Military officer, transgender rights activist, plaintiff | Bachelors in Sociology and Criminology, Masters in Global Security and Counterterrorism | |
| Jeff Timmons | Singer, producer, founding member of pop group 98 Degrees | B.S. Psychology (dropped out) | Music |
| Gerald Tinker | Member of gold-medal 4 x 100 meter relay team in 1972 Summer Olympics; professional football player in the NFL, 1974–1975 | | Athletics - Olympics, football |
| Arnulfo Trejo | Founder of REFORMA, an organization to promote library services to Latinos and Spanish-speaking individuals in the US | M.A. Library Science (1953) | Education |
| Bonnie Turner | Writer/creator, 3rd Rock from the Sun and That '70s Show | | Film and television |
| Dennis Chima Ugwuegbu | Nigeria's first professor of psychology | Ph.D. (1973) | Psychology |
| Thrity Umrigar | Indian-American writer | Ph.D. English (1997) | Literary |
| John Van Benschoten | Professional baseball player in Major League Baseball as a pitcher | | Athletics - baseball |
| Chris Vrenna | Former drummer for Nine Inch Nails, The Smashing Pumpkins, and Marilyn Manson | Dropped out | Music |
| Crista Nicole Wagner | Swimsuit model, Playboy Playmate | | Entertainment |
| Joe Walsh | Rock and roll guitarist with the Eagles | Did not graduate; honorary doctorate (2001) | Music |
| Ken Walter | Professional football player in the NFL, 1997–2006 | | Athletics - football |
| Carl E. Walz | Astronaut | B.S. Physics (1977) | Science |
| Paul Warfield | Professional football player in the NFL and member of the Pro Football Hall of Fame | M.A. Telecommunications (1977) | Athletics - football |
| Brad Warner | Author, documentarian, and punk rock bass guitarist | | Literary, performing arts |
| Henry Waszczuk | Professional football player in the CFL, 1975–1984 | | Athletics - football |
| Fred Weber | Original vocalist for the band Devo | B.A. Sociology (1970) | Music |
| Bert Weidner | Professional football player in the NFL, 1990–1995 | | Athletics - football |
| Eric Wilkerson | Professional football player | | Athletics - football |
| Jack Williams | Professional football player in the NFL | | Athletics - football |
| De'Angelo Wilson | Actor | | Performing arts |
| Brian Windhorst | Sportswriter for ESPN.com | B.S. Journalism (2000) | Journalism |
| Brian Winters | Professional football player in the NFL | | Athletics - football |
| Ray Wise | Film and television actor in Twin Peaks and RoboCop | B.F.A. (1969) | Film and television |
| Ryan Yip | Canadian professional golfer | B.S. (2005) | Athletics - golf |
| Usama Young | Professional football player in the NFL for the Cleveland Browns | | Athletics - football |
| Steve Zahursky | Professional football player in the NFL, 1998–2001 | | Athletics - football |
| Dolph Ziggler (Nick Nemeth) | Professional wrestler in WWE | | Sports/entertainment |
| Paul Zimmer | Author and poet | B.A.S. (1968) | Literary |
| Jim Zoet | Professional basketball player in the National Basketball Association, 1982–1983 | | Athletics - basketball |

^ attended classes only at the Stark Campus

== See also ==
- List of presidents of Kent State University
