= 1949 NCAA gymnastics championships =

American college gymnastics competition

- 1949
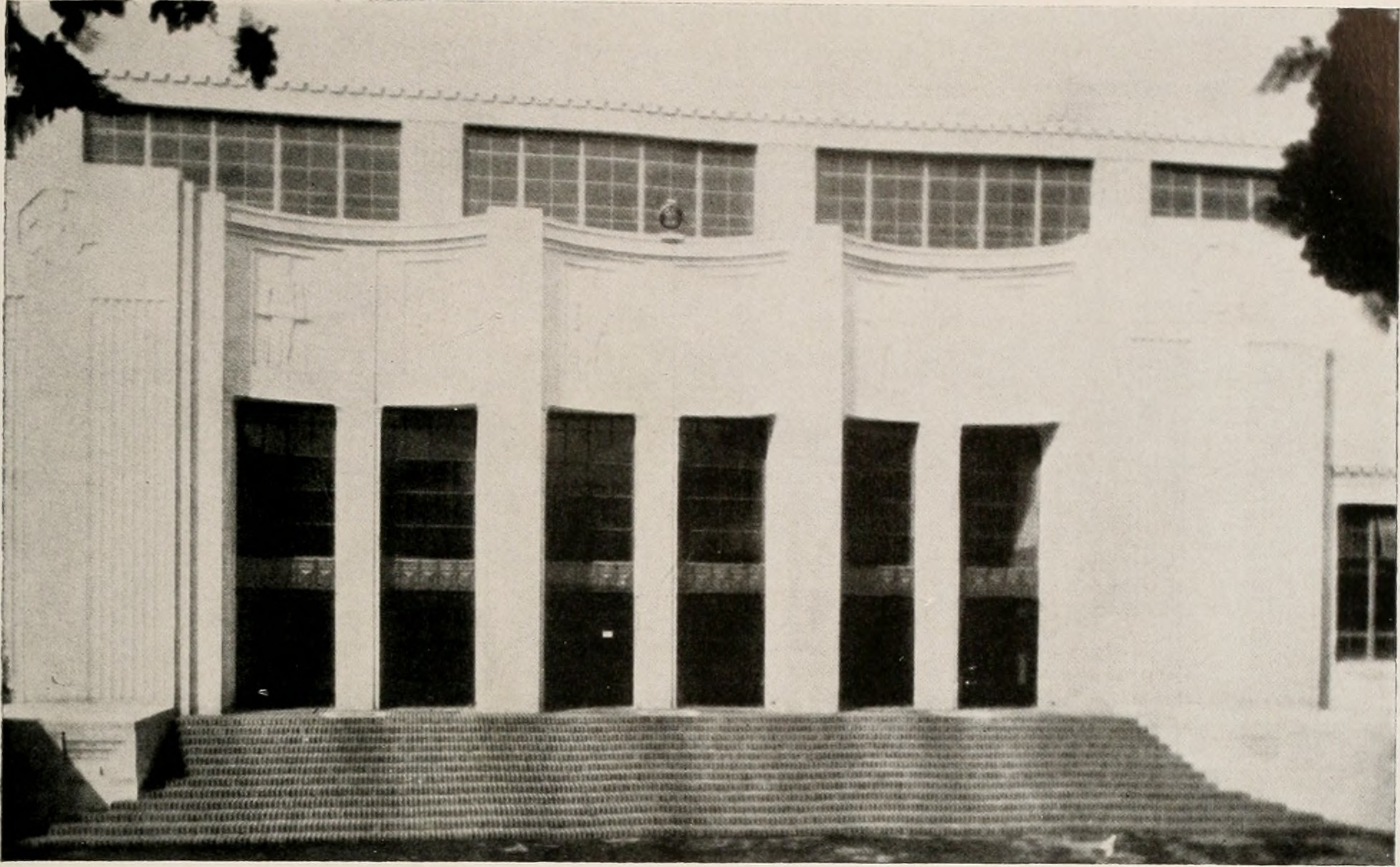
- Gymnasium for Men, site of the 1949 NCAA gymnastics championships

Tournament information
- Sport: Collegiate gymnastics
- Location: Berkeley, California
- Date: April 16, 1949
- Administrator: National Collegiate Athletic Association
- Host: University of California, Berkeley
- Venue: Gymnasium for Men
- Participants: 12 teams (Note: As reflected in the NCAA Record Book. Newspaper articles state participation from 15 teams. Arizona, San Jose State, and Stanford all reportedly scored 0 points.)

Final positions
- Champions: Temple (1st title)
- 1st runners-up: Minnesota
- 2nd runners-up: Illinois

Tournament statistics
- Attendance: 4,500
- All-Around Champion: Joe Kotys, Kent State (1035)

The 1949 NCAA gymnastics championships were contested at the seventh annual National Collegiate Athletic Association-sanctioned men's gymnastics championships to determine the team and individual national champions of men's collegiate gymnastics among its member programs in the United States.

The championships were hosted by the University of California, Berkeley at Gymnasium for Men in Berkeley, California.

Defending champions Penn State were bested by Maximillian Younger-led Temple. It was the Owls' first team gymnastics championship.

The individual all-around championship was won by Joe Kotys from Kent State.

== Team results ==
The table below reflects the official NCAA record books. However, newspaper recaps of the event reported 15 total teams with additional participation from Arizona, San Jose State, and Stanford who all reportedly scored 0 points. Some coverage reported Minnesota scoring 19 points, while another had major differences including overall placement.

Rank	Team	Points
1st place, gold medalist(s)	Temple	28
2nd place, silver medalist(s)	Minnesota	18
3rd place, bronze medalist(s)	Illinois	17.5
4	California	17
4	Kent State	17
6	Michigan State	15
7	USC	14.5
8	Army	11
9	Michigan	10
10	UCLA	3
11	Colorado	2
12	Occidental	1

== Individual event finals ==
=== Medalists ===
Event	Gold	Silver	Bronze
Individual All-Around	Joe Kotys, Kent State (1035)	Mel Stout, Michigan State (1025)	Bob Stout, Temple (1003)
Side Horse (Note: Currently known as Pommel Horse)	Joe Berenato, Temple (270)	Harry Shuler, USC (266)	Joe Kotys, Kent State (264)
Parallel Bars	Joe Kotys, Kent State; Mel Stout, Michigan State (274)	—N/a	Frank Dolan, Illinois (270)
Horizontal Bar	Bob Stout, Temple (277)	John Hodes, Army (275)	Mel Stout, Michigan State (270)
Trampoline	Edsel Buchanan, Michigan (275)	Gay Hughes (Note: As reflected in the NCAA Record Book. Illinois has also referenced him as Gaylord Hughes.), Illinois (268)	Charles Lucchesi, California (257)
Tumbling	Charlie Thompson (Note: As reflected in the NCAA Record Book. California has also referenced him as Chuck Thompson and newspapers have referenced him as Charles Thompson.), California (286)	Jim Peterson, Minnesota (265)	Charles Lucchesi, California (264)
Rope Climb	Ken Foreman, USC (3.4 sec.)	Bob Pearce, USC (4.2 sec.)	Bob Howell, California (4.4 sec.)
Flying Rings	Jerry Todd, USC (276)	Lewis Jamison, Army (273)	Donald Hedstrom, Minnesota (256)

== See also ==
- Pre-NCAA Gymnastics Champions
