= 1950 NCAA gymnastics championships =

American college gymnastics competition

- 1950

Tournament information
- Sport: Collegiate gymnastics
- Location: West Point, New York
- Date: April 1, 1950
- Administrator: National Collegiate Athletic Association
- Host(s): United States Military Academy
- Venue(s): Gillis Field House
- Participants: 14 teams (Note: As reflected in the NCAA Record Book. Newspaper articles state participation from 15 teams; Colorado reportedly scored 0 points.)

Final positions
- Champions: Illinois (5th title)
- 1st runners-up: Temple
- 2nd runners-up: Kent State

Tournament statistics
- All-Around Champion: Joe Kotys, Kent State (281)

The 1950 NCAA gymnastics championships were contested at the eighth annual National Collegiate Athletic Association-sanctioned men's gymnastics championships to determine the team and individual national champions of men's collegiate gymnastics among its member programs in the United States.

The championships were hosted by the United States Military Academy at Gillis Field House in West Point, New York.

Defending champions Temple were bested by Charlie Pond-led Illinois. It was Illinois' fifth team championship.

For the second consecutive year, the individual all-around championship was won by Joe Kotys from Kent State.

== Team results ==
The table below reflects the official NCAA record books. However, newspaper recaps of the event reported 15 total teams with additional participation from Colorado who reportedly scored 0 points. Additionally, a report had slightly differing scores and placements including Michigan scoring 15 points, which would place them 5th and elevate Michigan State to 4th, California and Penn State scoring 6 points each, which would result in a three-way tie for 10th place, and Chicago scoring 0 points, which would elevate Minnesota to 13th place and have Chicago in a 14th place tie with Colorado. Finally, Iowa State is a listed participant, but instead the team was Iowa, known as "State University of Iowa".

Rank	Team	Points
1st place, gold medalist(s)	Illinois	26
2nd place, silver medalist(s)	Temple	25
3rd place, bronze medalist(s)	Kent State	24
4	Michigan	19
5	Michigan State	17.5
6	Syracuse	14
7	Navy	13
8	USC	8
9	Army	7.5
10	California	6.5
11	Iowa State	6
12	Penn State	5.5
13	Chicago	3
14	Minnesota	1

== Individual event finals ==
=== Medalists ===
Event	Gold	Silver	Bronze
Individual All-Around	Joe Kotys, Kent State (?)	Unknown	Unknown
Side Horse (Note: Currently known as Pommel Horse)	Gene Rabbitt (Note: As reflected in the NCAA Record Book. Syracuse has also referenced him as Eugene Rabbitt.), Syracuse (?)	Unknown	Unknown
Parallel Bars	Joe Kotys, Kent State (281)	John P. Barthel Michigan (278)	Unknown
Horizontal Bar	Joe Kotys, Kent State (?)	Unknown	Unknown
Trampoline	Edsel Buchanan, Michigan (266)	Bill Harris, Iowa (?)	Unknown
Tumbling	Irvin Bedard (Note: Reflected in the NCAA Record Book as Irving Bedard.), Illinois (?)	Unknown	Unknown
Rope Climb	Leo Minotti, Syracuse (3.5 sec.)	Marvin Schenker, Navy (3.7 sec.)	Unknown
Flying Rings	Bob Schneider, Navy (?)	Unknown	Unknown

== See also ==
- Pre-NCAA Gymnastics Champions
