= Tom Kleinlein =

American-football player and athletic director

Current position
- Title: Deputy athletic director
- Team: Ole Miss
- Conference: SEC

Playing career
- 1989–1992: Wake Forest
- Position: Offensive line

Administrative career (AD unless noted)
- 2005–2010: Arizona State (assistant AD)
- 2010–2012: Kent State (deputy AD)
- 2012–2020: Georgia Southern
- 2020–present: Ole Miss (deputy AD)

Tom Kleinlein is the former director of athletics for Georgia Southern University. He previously served as assistant athletic director for Kent State University and Arizona State University. Kleinlein attended college at Wake Forest University, where he played on the offensive line for the Wake Forest Demon Deacons football team between 1989 and 1992. Kleinlein resigned his position at Georgia Southern on January 3, 2020. Kleinlein was named deputy athletic director at the University of Mississippi on January 4, 2020.
