= Jan Dowling =

College golf coach and former golfer (born 1980)

Biographical details
- Born: September 26, 1980 (age 46); Newmarket, Ontario, Canada

Playing career
- 1999–2002: Kent State University

Coaching career (HC unless noted)
- 2005–2007: Kent State University (Asst.)
- 2008: Duke University (Asst.)
- 2009–2012: University of Florida
- 2013–: University of Michigan

Accomplishments and honors

Awards
- Canadian Ladies Amateur Champion (2000); Female Amateur Golfer of the Year (2000); MAC Player of the Year (2000)

Jan Dowling (born September 26, 1980) is a Canadian-born American college golf coach and former amateur golfer. Dowling is the head coach of the Michigan Wolverines women's golf team and previously served as the head coach of the Florida Gators women's golf team of the University of Florida.

== Early life and education ==
Dowling was born in Newmarket, Ontario, Canada, and grew up in Bradford, Ontario. She graduated from Kent State University in Kent, Ohio with her bachelor's degree in leisure studies in 2002. She competed for the Kent State Golden Flashes women's golf team, earning four varsity letters.

== Playing career ==
During her collegiate playing career at Kent State University, Dowling was recognized as Mid-American Conference Player of the Year in 2000. She won the 2000 Canadian Women's Amateur. After graduation, she was also a member of the Canadian national team for the 2002 World Golf Amateur Championships and was a member of the Ontario Amateur Team in 1999. She also played professionally from 2003 to 2005 and competed on the Golf Channel show The Big Break.

== Coaching career ==
The University Athletic Association (UAA) announced its hiring of Dowling as the new head coach of the Florida Gators women's golf team on June 15, 2009. Dowling previously served as the assistant coach for the Duke University women's golf program for the 2008–2009 season, and three seasons as the women's assistant golf coach at Kent State University from 2006 to 2008.

In her first season as Florida's new head coach, Dowling's Lady Gators finished tenth of twelve teams at the Southeastern Conference (SEC) championship tournament in Tuscaloosa, Alabama, and eleventh of twenty-four teams at the NCAA East Regional Tournament in Greenville, North Carolina. In her second year as the Lady Gators' coach, the team showed remarkable advancement, finishing as the tenth best women's college team in the country in the NCAA championship tournament.

Dowling became head coach of the University of Michigan's women's golf team in May 2013.

== Head coaching record ==
=== Women's golf ===
Record table
Season	Team	Overall	Conference	Standing	Postseason
Florida Gators (Southeastern Conference) (2010–present)
2010	Florida			10th	NCAA East Regional 11th
2011	Florida			9th	NCAA T–10th
2012	Florida			4th	NCAA 12th
Florida:					
Total:					
National champion Postseason invitational champion Conference regular season champion Conference regular season and conference tournament champion Division regular season champion Division regular season and conference tournament champion Conference tournament champion

== See also ==
- List of Kent State University alumni
