= Mid-American Conference field hockey tournament =

Field hockey championship tournament

- Conference field hockey championship
- Sport: Field hockey
- Conference: Mid-American Conference
- Number of teams: 6
- Format: Single-elimination tournament
- Played: 1983-present
- Current champion: Miami RedHawks
- Most championships: Kent State Golden Flashes (12 titles)

The Mid-American Conference field hockey tournament is an NCAA Division I postseason single-elimination tournament. The winner of the tournament receives the Mid-American Conference (MAC) automatic bid to the NCAA Division I field hockey tournament. The tournament features six teams with three rounds of competition, a first round, a semifinal round, and finals round. The tournament began in 1983.

== Tournament champions ==
Year	Champion
1983	Ball State
1984	Ball State
1985	Ball State
1986	Ball State
1987	Ohio
1988	Kent State
1989	Ball State
1990	Central Michigan
1991	Kent State
1992	Kent State
1993	Ball State
1994	Ball State
1995	Ball State
1996	No champion (tournament cancelled after the first round due to unplayable field conditions following a snowstorm)
1997	Ball State
1998	Kent State
1999	Kent State
2000	Kent State
2001	Ohio
2002	Kent State
2003	Louisville
2004	Louisville
2005	Central Michigan
2006	Ohio
2007	Ohio
2008	Kent State
2009	Ohio
2010	Kent State
2011	Ohio
2012	Miami
2013	Miami
2014	Kent State
2015	Kent State
2016	Kent State
2017	Miami
2018	Miami
2019	Miami
2020	No champion (tournament cancelled due to COVID-19 pandemic)
2021	Miami
2022	Miami
2023	Miami
2024	Miami
2025	Miami
2026	Miami

== Number of championships by school ==
- Kent State - 12 titles
- Miami - 11 titles
- Ball State - 9 titles
- Ohio - 6 titles
- Central Michigan - 2 titles
- Louisville - 2 titles
