= Kent State Golden Flashes women's golf =

College golf team

- University: Kent State University
- Conference: Mid-American Conference
- Head coach: Casey VanDamme (5th season)
- Location: Kent, Ohio
- Course: Windmill Lakes
- Nickname: Golden Flashes
- Colors: Navy blue and gold

NCAA match play
- 2017, 2018

NCAA Championship appearances
- 2001, 2003, 2006, 2010, 2017, 2018, 2019, 2021

Conference champions
- 1999, 2000, 2001, 2002, 2003, 2004, 2005, 2006, 2007, 2008, 2009, 2010, 2011, 2012, 2013, 2014, 2015, 2016, 2017, 2018, 2019, 2021, 2022, 2023, 2024, 2025, 2026

Individual conference champions
- 1999, 2000, 2001, 2002, 2003, 2004, 2006, 2007, 2008, 2009, 2010, 2013, 2014, 2015, 2017, 2018, 2019, 2021, 2023, 2024 (2), 2026

The Kent State Golden Flashes women's golf team is an intercollegiate sport at Kent State University in Kent, Ohio, United States. The program was established in 1998 and competes in the National Collegiate Athletic Association at the Division I level as a member of the Mid-American Conference (MAC). Through the 2025–26 season, the Flashes have won 27 conference titles, all consecutively. Kent State is the only school to win the Mid-American Conference Women's Golf Championships, and has had team members win individual medalist honors in 21 of those years. The 27 consecutive MAC titles are a conference record for consecutive titles in any sport. In addition to their conference titles, Kent State has made 25 consecutive appearances in the regional round of the NCAA Division I Women's Golf Championships, winning one regional title, advancing to the championship round eight times, and to the final match play round twice. The program's highest national finish is a tie for 5th in 2017 and 2018.

Windmill Lakes Golf Club in Ravenna serves as the program's home course and occasionally hosts matches. The main practice facility is the Page and Ferrara Golf Training and Learning Center, a 10,000-square-foot (930 m^{2}) building located in Franklin Township, which the team shares with the men's golf team. The facility includes a 350-yard (320 m) outdoor practice range, outdoor practice tees, and outdoor short-game practice areas as well as an indoor putting and chipping area, a video analysis room, and a Science and Motion Putt lab. In addition, the rear of the facility features heated stalls which allow team members to access the driving range year-round.

The Flashes' head coach is Casey VanDamme, who was hired in August 2021. VanDamme came from South Dakota State University, where he had previously served as the head coach for both the men's and women's golf programs. He is the Flashes' fourth head coach, succeeding Lisa Strom, who left in July 2021 to take the head coaching job at Ohio State. Strom was hired at KSU in July 2019 as the program's third head coach and replaced Greg Robertson, who left for Oklahoma State following the 2018–19 season. Prior to Robertson, the team was coached by Mike Morrow from its inception until 2013, then by men's golf coach Herb Page on an interim basis for the remainder of the 2012–13 season.

== History ==
Plans for the team were first explored in 1995 as Kent State began looking into ways to increase women's athletic opportunities to be in compliance with Title IX. The university ultimately decided to add women's soccer for 1997, golf for 1998, and tennis for 1999, though the tennis team was never realized. Mike Morrow, a Kent State alumnus who had played on the KSU men's golf team in the 1970s, was hired as the women's golf program first head coach in September 1997. The team played in their first match one year later, placing fourth out of 13 teams in the Mary Fossum Invitational at Forest Akers Golf Courses in East Lansing, Michigan, on September 12 and 13, 1998. In their second tournament one week later, the Flashes finished second out of 20 teams in the Huskie Classic in Genoa, Illinois, and the following week, Kent State claimed its first tournament win in program history, winning the Lady Falcon Invitational in Bowling Green, Ohio, held September 26 and 27. The Flashes won the inaugural Mid-American Conference Women's Golf Championships the following April, winning the team title by 25 strokes. Jan Dowling was MAC medalist, with teammates finishing second and tied for third in the individual competition. The 2008 MAC championship set the conference record for largest margin of victory, with KSU winning by 66 strokes.

Through the 2024 season, Kent State has won over 50 tournaments, including 25 MAC championships. Mike Morrow coached the team from its establishment in 1998 until January 2013, midway through the 2012–13 season, when he announced his retirement. Under Morrow, the team played in 166 events and won 31 of them, including 14 MAC championships, and advanced to the NCAA tournament 12 times, reaching the championship round in five of those years. Morrow was replaced for the remainder of the 2012–13 season by men's golf coach Herb Page on an interim basis, who guided the team to its 15th-consecutive MAC championship and 13th-consecutive appearance in the NCAA tournament. Greg Robertson, who had previously served as a women's golf assistant coach at Purdue, was hired as head coach in May 2013. In his six seasons as head coach, Robertson led the team to 26 team titles including a program-best six titles in 2015–16 and 2018–19. Included in the total are six more MAC championships and six appearances in the NCAA regional tournament, along with a regional title in 2019. The 2017 team advanced to the championship round for the first time since 2010 and had their best finish in program history, finishing in a tie for fifth after advancing to the match play round.

== MAC championships ==
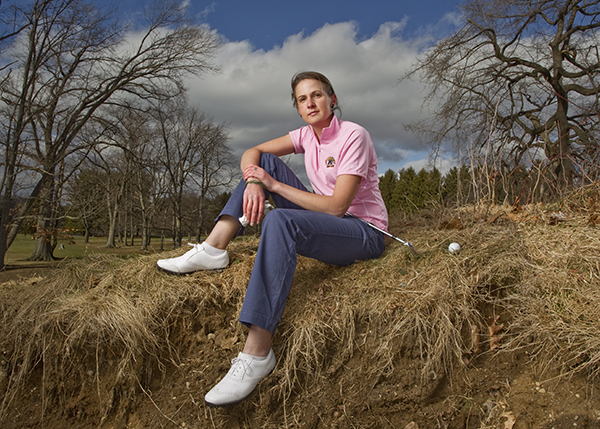
Sarah Bradley in 2011

The Mid-American Conference added women's golf as a sponsored sport beginning in the 1998–99 season, with Kent State one of seven conference schools to begin offering the sport that season at the varsity level. The inaugural Mid-American Conference Women's Golf Championship was held in April 1999, which the Flashes won by 25 strokes. Through the 2026 championship, Kent State is the only conference member to ever win the conference meet, winning all 27 titles that have been contested. During the streak, the Flashes have won the tournament by as many as 66 strokes in 2002 and as few as four strokes in 2016, and have claimed the individual conference title in 21 of those years, including co-medalist titles in 2024. Their 18th consecutive title in 2016 set a new MAC record for consecutive conference titles by a single school in any sport.

Year	Course	Location	Finish	Top individual (place)
1999	Kings Island	Mason, Ohio	1st	Jan Dowling (1st)
2000	Walden Ponds	Hamilton, Ohio	1st	Jan Dowling (1st)
2001	Walden Ponds	Hamilton, Ohio	1st	Martina Gillen (1st)
2002	Walden Ponds	Hamilton, Ohio	1st	Martina Gillen (1st)
2003	Walden Ponds	Hamilton, Ohio	1st	Verionique Drouin (1st)
2004	Walden Ponds	Hamilton, Ohio	1st	Gabby Wedding (1st)
2005	Walden Ponds	Hamilton, Ohio	1st	Tara Delaney (T-4th)
2006	Walden Ponds	Hamilton, Ohio	1st	Tara Delaney (1st)
2007	Longaberger Golf Club	Nashport, Ohio	1st	Kira Meixner (1st)
2008	Brickyard Course	Indianapolis	1st	Kirby Dreher (1st)
2009	Longaberger Golf Club	Nashport, Ohio	1st	Mercedes Germino (1st)
2010	Hawthorns Golf & Country Club	Fishers, Indiana	1st	Martina Gavier (1st)
2011	Longaberger Golf Club	Nashport, Ohio	1st	Sarah Bradley (3rd)
2012	Hawthorns Golf & Country Club	Fishers, Indiana	1st	Mercedes Germino (3rd)
2013	Longaberger Golf Club	Nashport, Ohio	1st	Jennifer Ha (1st)
2014	Hawthorns Golf & Country Club	Fishers, Indiana	1st	Jennifer Ha (1st)
2015	Shaker Run Golf Club	Lebanon, Ohio	1st	Josee Doyon (1st)
2016	Purgatory Golf Club	Noblesville, Indiana	1st	Wad Phaewchimplee (T-4th)
2017	Silver Lake Country Club	Silver Lake, Ohio	1st	Michaela Finn (1st)
2018	Naperville Country Club	Naperville, Illinois	1st	Pimnipa Panthong (1st)
2019	Purgatory Golf Club	Noblesville, Indiana	1st	Karoline Stormo (1st)
2020	Silver Lake Country Club	Silver Lake, Ohio	Canceled due to coronavirus pandemic	
2021	Silver Lake Country Club	Silver Lake, Ohio	1st	Caley McGinty (1st)
2022	Stone Oak Country Club	Holland, Ohio	1st	Chloe Salort (2nd)
2023	Kalamazoo Country Club	Kalamazoo, Michigan	1st	Leon Takagi (1st)
2024	Pinnacle Golf Club	Grove City, Ohio	1st	Hester Sicking (T-1st), Leon Takagi (T-1st)
2025	Delaware Country Club	Muncie, Indiana	1st	Gracie Larsen (T-2nd), Aryn Matthews (T-2nd), Isabella Goyette (T-2nd)
2026	Firestone Country Club	Akron, Ohio	1st	Veronika Kedroňová (1st)
Totals: 27 MAC Championships; 22 MAC medalists

== NCAA tournament ==
Kent State has made 25 consecutive appearances in the regional round of the NCAA Division I Women's Golf Championships through 2026, making their first tournament in 2001. They have advanced to the championship round eight times, most recently in 2021. The program's best placements were in 2017 and 2018 when they advanced to match play and finished tied for fifth nationally. Their previous best finish was in 2001, when the Flashes placed 15th in the championship round.

Year	Round	Course	Location	Finish
2001	Regional	Kampen Golf Course	West Lafayette, Indiana	7th
2001	Championship	El Campeon Golf Course	Howey-In-The-Hills, Florida	15th
2002	Regional	Forest Akers West Golf Course	East Lansing, Michigan	9th
2003	Regional	Firethorn Golf Course	Lincoln, Nebraska	2nd
2003	Championship	Kampen Golf Course	West Lafayette, Indiana	T-19th
2004	Regional	Firethorn Golf Course	Lincoln, Nebraska	20th
2005	Regional	The Rawls Golf Course	Lubbock, Texas	11th
2006	Regional	The Traditions Club	Bryan, Texas	T-6th
2006	Championship	Ohio State University Golf Club Scarlet Course	Upper Arlington, Ohio	21st
2007	Regional	University of Michigan Golf Course	Ann Arbor, Michigan	10th
2008	Regional	University of Texas Golf Club	Austin, Texas	14th
2009	Regional	Ohio State University Golf Club Scarlet Course	Upper Arlington, Ohio	12th
2010	Regional	Otter Creek Golf Course	Columbus, Indiana	8th
2010	Championship	Country Club of Landfall	Wilmington, North Carolina	22nd
2011	Regional	Warren Golf Course	South Bend, Indiana	14th
2012	Regional	Penn State Blue Course	State College, Pennsylvania	16th
2013	Regional	Stanford University Golf Course	Palo Alto, California	12th
2014	Regional	Karsten Creek Golf Club	Stillwater, Oklahoma	10th
2015	Regional	Warren Golf Course	South Bend, Indiana	9th
2016	Regional	The Traditions Club	Bryan, Texas	8th
2017	Regional	The Rawls Course	Lubbock, Texas	6th
2017	Championship	Rich Harvest Farms	Sugar Grove, Illinois	T-5th
2018	Regional	TPC Harding Park	San Francisco	5th
2018	Championship	Karsten Creek Golf Club	Stillwater, Oklahoma	T-5th
2019	Regional	Forest Akers West Golf Course	East Lansing, Michigan	1st
2019	Championship	Blessings Golf Club	Fayetteville, Arkansas	19th
2021	Regional	Ohio State University Golf Club Scarlet Course	Upper Arlington, Ohio	5th
2021	Championship	Grayhawk Golf Club	Scottsdale, Arizona	17th
2022	Regional	Vanderbilt Legends Club	Franklin, Tennessee	10th
2023	Regional	University of Georgia Golf Course	Athens, Georgia	10th
2024	Regional	Spanish Trail Country Club	Spring Valley, Nevada	8th
2025	Regional	Ohio State University Golf Club	Upper Arlington, Ohio	7th
2026	Regional	Finley Golf Course	Chapel Hill, North Carolina	
25 NCAA regional round appearances 1 regional championship 8 championship round appearances

Championship round qualifying finishes shaded in ██ light yellow.

== Head coaches ==
Name	Years	Seasons	Events	Team titles	MAC titles	NCAA appearances
Mike Morrow	1998–2013	15	172	31	14	Regional: 12; Championship: 4
Herb Page	2013	1	11	2	1	Regional: 1
Greg Robertson	2013–2019	6	72	27	6	Regional: 6 Championship: 3
Lisa Strom	2019–2021	2	15	9	1	Regional: 1 Championship: 1
Casey VanDamme	2021–present	5	58	7	5	Regional: 5

== Awards ==
The Mid-American Conference has four awards, which are selected at the conference championship: Sportswoman of the Year, Golfer of the Year, Freshman of the Year, and Coach of the Year, along with the first team all-MAC, second team all-MAC, and all-tournament team. Sportswoman of the Year is selected by fellow players, while the other awards and honorary teams are selected by a vote of the head coaches. Pimnipa Panthong became the first player in conference history to win both the Golfer of the Year and Freshman of the Year honors, claiming both in 2017.

MAC Golfer of the Year
Name	Year(s)
Jan Dowling	2000
Martina Gillen	2001, 2002
Veronique Drouin	2003
Gabby Wedding	2004, 2005
Tara Delaney	2006, 2007
Kira Meixner	2008
Kirby Dreher	2009
Martina Gavier	2010, 2011
Mercedes Germino	2012
Jennifer Ha	2013, 2014
Josee Doyon	2015
Taylor Kim	2016
Pimnipa Panthong	2017, 2018
Karoline Stormo	2019
Caley McGinty	2021
Mayka Hoogeboom	2023
Leon Takagi	2024
Veronika Kedronova	2025

MAC Freshman of the Year
Name	Year(s)
Jan Dowling	1999
Veronique Drouin	2000
Martina Gillen	2001
Gabby Wedding	2002
Tara Delaney	2005
Kirby Dreher	2006
Martina Gavier	2008
Mercedes Germino	2009
Jennifer Ha	2012
Wad Phaewchimplee	2014
Pimnipa Panthong	2017
Thitapa Pakdeesetakul	2019
Leon Takagi	2023
Veronika Kedronova	2024
Gracie Larsen	2025

MAC Coach of the Year
Name	Year(s)
Mike Morrow	1999, 2000, 2001, 2002, 2003, 2005, 2006, 2008, 2009, 2012
Greg Robertson	2015, 2017, 2018, 2019
Lisa Strom	2021
Casey VanDamme	2023, 2024, 2025

== Facilities ==
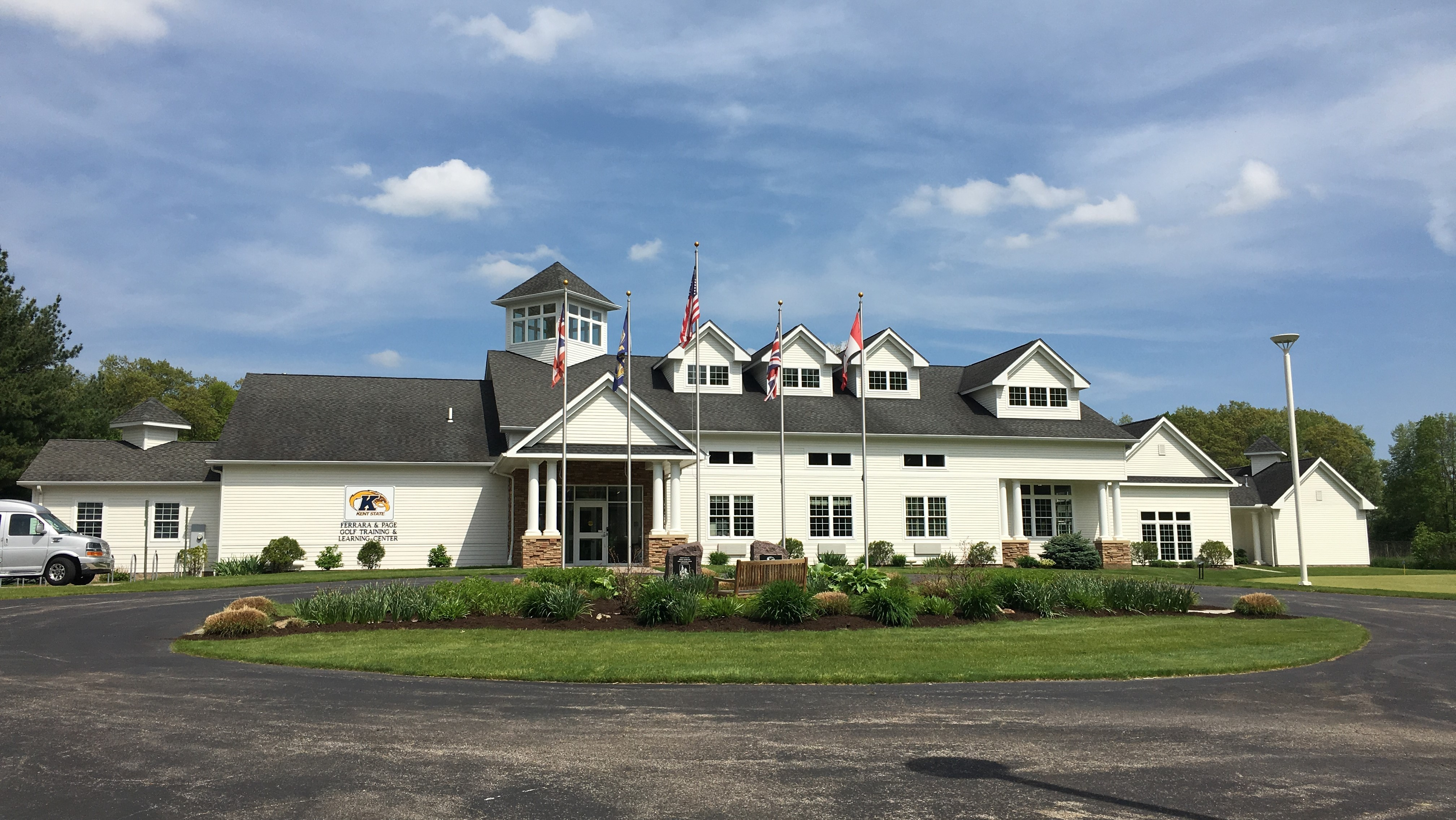
Ferra and Page Golf Training and Learning Center in Franklin Township

The team's home course is Windmill Lakes Golf Club, located approximately 6 miles (9.7 km) east of Kent in Ravenna, which has also been used by the men's golf team since 1978. Windmill Lakes is a par 70 course measuring 6,936 yards (6,342 m). It is mainly used for practices and while it has yet to be used for a women's golf tournament, it has hosted occasional men's tournaments, including the Mid-American Conference Men's Golf Championships in 1984 and 1993 and the FirstEnergy Intercollegiate as recently as 2008.

The main training facility for both KSU golf teams is the Ferrara and Page Golf Training and Learning Center, located in Franklin Township adjacent to the southern boundary of the former KSU Golf Course, less than one mile (1.6 km) north of Dix Stadium. The facility, named after men's head coach Herb Page and philanthropists Emilio and Margaret Ferrara, includes a 10,000 square feet (930 m^{2}) outdoor putting green, a 350-yard (320 m) practice range, along with practice fairways and tee areas, and heated bays that allow outdoor practice during winter months. Inside is a 3,000 square feet (280 m^{2}) practice green, team locker rooms, video room, offices, weight room, and a lounge and study area.

== Notable alumni ==
- Jan Dowling, 1998–2002, Canadian professional golfer on the LPGA Futures Tour from 2003 to 2005; collegiate head coach since 2010
