= Mid-American Conference Women's Golf Championships =

Mid-American Conference women's golf championships
- Conference golf championship
- Sport: Women's golf
- Conference: Mid-American Conference
- Number of teams: 10
- Played: 1999–present
- Last contest: 2026
- Current champion: Kent State
- Most championships: Kent State (27)
- Official website: getsomemaction.com/sports/wgolf

Host locations
- Akron, Ohio (2026); Muncie, Indiana (2025); Grove City, Ohio (2024); Kalamazoo, Michigan (2023); Holland, Ohio (2022); Naperville, Illinois (2018); Silver Lake, Ohio (2017, 2021); Noblesville, Indiana (2016, 2019); Lebanon, Ohio (2015); Fishers, Indiana (2010, 2012, 2014); Nashport, Ohio (2007, 2009, 2011, 2013); Indianapolis (2008); Hamilton, Ohio (2000–2006); Mason, Ohio (1999)

The Mid-American Conference women's golf championships is the conference championship tournament for women's golf in the Mid-American Conference, a Division I member of the National Collegiate Athletic Association (NCAA). All ten conference members qualify for the championship meet, which is held in three rounds. The winner of the championship receives a regional berth to the NCAA Division I Women's Golf Championships. The tournament began in 1999 and is rotated to different courses each year, with the various conference members acting as host. Through the 2026 championship, Kent State has won all 27 titles, a conference record for consecutive championships in any sport.

== History and format ==
The championship was organized in 1999 after several conference members added women's golf as a varsity sport in the late 1990s. It is played in late April and consists of three rounds of stroke play held over three days with all ten conference members participating. The 2005 championship only had two rounds played instead of the originally scheduled three due to weather. Beginning in 2006, the format was changed to four rounds, with two rounds on the opening day, but was returned to three rounds in 2010. The inaugural championship, held at the Kings Island Golf Course in Mason, Ohio, consisted of seven teams: Bowling Green, Eastern Michigan, Kent State, Northern Illinois, Ohio, Toledo, and Western Michigan. The total increased to eight in 2001 with the addition of Ball State and nine in 2003 with Marshall joining, but returned to eight for 2006 after Marshall left the MAC following the 2005 season. Akron began MAC play in 2009 and Central Michigan joined in 2015.

Since its debut, the championship has been held at multiple golf courses in Ohio, Indiana, and Illinois. After the inaugural championship at Kings Island, the championship moved to Walden Ponds Golf Club, just outside Hamilton, Ohio, where it was played from 2000 through 2006. Since 2006, the championship has been held at a different course each year, with some courses hosting multiple times. Longaberger Golf Club in Nashport, Ohio, has hosted four times: 2007, 2009, 2011, and 2013, while Hawthorns Golf and Country Club in Fishers, Indiana, has hosted three times: 2010, 2012, and 2014. Other hosts include Brickyard Crossing in Indianapolis for 2008, Shaker Run Golf Club in Lebanon, Ohio, for 2015, Purgatory Golf Club in Noblesville, Indiana, in 2016 and 2019, Silver Lake Country Club in Silver Lake, Ohio, in 2017 and 2021, Naperville Country Club in Naperville, Illinois, in 2018, Stone Oak Country Club near Holland, Ohio, in Springfield Township in 2022, Kalamazoo Country Club in Kalamazoo, Michigan, in 2023, Pinnacle Golf Club in Grove City, Ohio, in 2024, Delaware Country Club near Muncie, Indiana, in 2025, and Firestone Country Club in Akron, Ohio, in 2026.

== Champions ==
=== By year ===
The following is a list of conference champions, individual medalists, and sites listed by year.

Year	Venue	Location	Team champion	Medalist (school)
1999	Golf Center at Kings Island	Mason, Ohio	Kent State	Jan Dowling (Kent State)
2000	Walden Ponds Golf Club	Hamilton, Ohio	Kent State	Jan Dowling (Kent State)
2001	Walden Ponds Golf Club	Hamilton, Ohio	Kent State	Martina Gillen (Kent State)
2002	Walden Ponds Golf Club	Hamilton, Ohio	Kent State	Martina Gillen (Kent State)
2003	Walden Ponds Golf Club	Hamilton, Ohio	Kent State	Verionique Drouin (Kent State)
2004	Walden Ponds Golf Club	Hamilton, Ohio	Kent State	Gabby Wedding (Kent State)
2005	Walden Ponds Golf Club	Hamilton, Ohio	Kent State	Katie Sundberg (Ball State)
2006	Walden Ponds Golf Club	Hamilton, Ohio	Kent State	Tara Delaney (Kent State)
2007	Longaberger Golf Club	Nashport, Ohio	Kent State	Kira Meixner (Kent State)
2008	Brickyard Course	Indianapolis, Indiana	Kent State	Kirby Dreher (Kent State)
2009	Longaberger Golf Club	Nashport, Ohio	Kent State	Mercedes Germino (Kent State)
2010	Hawthorns Golf & Country Club	Fishers, Indiana	Kent State	Martina Gavier (Kent State)
2011	Longaberger Golf Club	Nashport, Ohio	Kent State	Sarah Johnson (Eastern Michigan)
2012	Hawthorns Golf & Country Club	Fishers, Indiana	Kent State	Piyathida Chaiyapan (Toledo); Jenna Hague (Ball State)
2013	Longaberger Golf Club	Nashport, Ohio	Kent State	Jennifer Ha (Kent State)
2014	Hawthorns Golf & Country Club	Fishers, Indiana	Kent State	Jennifer Ha (Kent State)
2015	Shaker Run Golf Club	Lebanon, Ohio	Kent State	Josee Doyon (Kent State)
2016	Purgatory Golf Club	Noblesville, Indiana	Kent State	Danielle Nicholson (Akron)
2017	Silver Lake Country Club	Silver Lake, Ohio	Kent State	Michaela Finn (Kent State)
2018	Naperville Country Club	Naperville, Illinois	Kent State	Pimnipa Panthong (Kent State)
2019	Purgatory Golf Club	Noblesville, Indiana	Kent State	Karoline Stormo (Kent State)
2020	Silver Lake Country Club	Silver Lake, Ohio	Cancelled due to the coronavirus pandemic	
2021	Silver Lake Country Club	Silver Lake, Ohio	Kent State	Caley McGinty (Kent State)
2022	Stone Oak Country Club	Holland, Ohio	Kent State	Jasmine Ly (Northern Illinois)
2023	Kalamazoo Country Club	Kalamazoo, Michigan	Kent State	Leon Takagi (Kent State)
2024	Pinnacle Golf Club	Grove City, Ohio	Kent State	Hester Sicking (Kent State); Leon Takagi (Kent State)
2025	Delaware Country Club	Muncie, Indiana	Kent State	Jasmine Driscoll (Ball State)
2026	Firestone Country Club	Akron, Ohio	Kent State	Veronika Kedroňová (Kent State)

=== By school ===
The following table lists all teams that have been part of the championship, the years they have participated, and the years the respective program has won the team championship.

Program	Tenure	Titles	Years won
Kent State	1999–present	27	1999, 2000, 2001, 2002, 2003, 2004, 2005, 2006, 2007, 2008, 2009, 2010, 2011, 2012, 2013, 2014, 2015, 2016, 2017, 2018, 2019, 2021, 2022, 2023, 2024, 2025, 2026
Bowling Green	1999–present	0	
Eastern Michigan	1999–present	0	
Northern Illinois	1999–present	0	
Ohio	1999–present	0	
Toledo	1999–present	0	
Western Michigan	1999–present	0	
Ball State	2001–present	0	
Akron	2009–present	0	
Central Michigan	2015–present	0	
Marshall	2003–2005	0	

Former conference members shaded in ██ silver
