= Joe Kotys =

American gymnast (1925–2012)

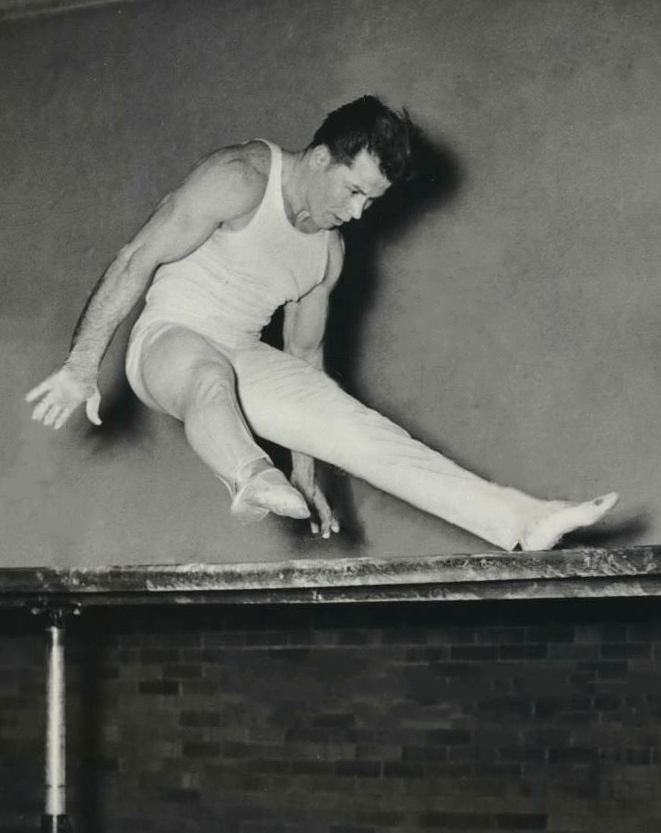
- Kotys in 1949

Personal information
- Full name: Joseph Kotys
- Born: October 31, 1925 Olyphant, Pennsylvania, U.S.
- Died: August 21, 2012 (aged 86) Florida, U.S.

Gymnastics career
- Discipline: Men's artistic gymnastics
- Country represented: United States
- College team: Kent State Golden Flashes
- Gym: Swiss Turners
Medal record
Men's artistic gymnastics
Representing United States
Event	1st	2nd	3rd
Pan American Games	2	2	2
Total	2	2	2
Pan American Games
Gold medal – first place	1955 Mexico City	Team
Gold medal – first place	1955 Mexico City	Vault
Silver medal – second place	1955 Mexico City	All-around
Silver medal – second place	1955 Mexico City	Floor
Bronze medal – third place	1955 Mexico City	Pommel horse
Bronze medal – third place	1955 Mexico City	Horizontal bar
Representing Kent State Golden Flashes
Event	1st	2nd	3rd
NCAA Championships	6	0	0
Total	6	0	0
NCAA Championships
Gold medal – first place	1949 Berkeley	All-around
Gold medal – first place	1949 Berkeley	Parallel bars
Gold medal – first place	1950 West Point	All-around
Gold medal – first place	1950 West Point	Parallel bars
Gold medal – first place	1950 West Point	Horizontal bar
Gold medal – first place	1951 Ann Arbor	Pommel horse

Joseph Kotys (October 31, 1925 – August 21, 2012) was an American artistic gymnast. He was a member of the United States men's national artistic gymnastics team and won a team gold medal and three individual medals at the 1955 Pan American Games. At the 1948 Summer Olympics, he placed seventh with the team and had his best individual result of twenty-third place on pommel horse.

== Formative years ==
Kotys fought in World War II as a gunner on a Boeing B-17 Flying Fortress and completed twenty-two missions. He attended Kent State University and was a member of the Kent State Golden Flashes men's swimming and diving and men's gymnastics teams. As a diver, he won the Ohio Conference three times. As a gymnast, he won National Collegiate Athletic Association (NCAA) titles in the all-around in 1949–50, on parallel bars in 1949–50, on the horizontal bar in 1950, and on the pommel horse in 1951. He also won three Amateur Athletic Union (AAU) titles, in the vault in 1948 and on parallel bars in 1948 and 1951. While competing on rings at the 1956 U.S. Olympic Trials he crashed to the floor due to a failed support mount.

== Professional life ==
Kotys retired shortly after his injury in the U.S. Olympic Trials and became a gymnastics coach in Ohio. In 1978, he was inducted into the U.S. Gymnastics Hall of Fame. During the early 1960s, he was a gymnastics coach in Cuyahoga Falls, Ohio.

Kotys was a member of Swiss Turners of Cleveland.

== Death ==
Ailing with pancreatic cancer, Kotys died from cancer-related complications in Florida on August 21, 2012.
