= 1951 NCAA gymnastics championships =

American college gymnastics competition

Tournament information
- Sport: Collegiate gymnastics
- Location: Ann Arbor, Michigan
- Host(s): University of Michigan
- Venue(s): Yost Field House
- Participants: 13 teams

Final positions
- Champions: Florida State (1st title)
- Runner-up: Illinois; USC

Tournament statistics
- All-Around Champion(s): Bill Roetzheim, Florida State

The 1951 NCAA gymnastics championships were contested at the ninth annual NCAA-sanctioned gymnastics meet to determine the team and individual national champions of men's collegiate gymnastics among its member programs in the United States.

These championships were contested at Yost Field House at the University of Michigan in Ann Arbor, Michigan.

Event debutants Florida State finished on top of the team standings, the Seminoles' first team gymnastics title.

The individual all-around championship was won by Bill Roetzheim, also from Florida State.

== Team results ==
- (H) = Hosts
- (DC) = Defending champions
- Italics = Debut appearance

Rank	Team	Points
1st place, gold medalist(s)	Florida State	26
2nd place, silver medalist(s)	Illinois (DC)	23.5
2nd place, silver medalist(s)	USC	23.5
4	Navy	18.5
5	Kent State	17
6	Syracuse	16
7	Michigan State	13.5
8	Army	9.5
9	Michigan (H)	8.5
10	Temple	7
11	Penn State	5
12	California	2
13	Minnesota	1

== See also ==
- Pre-NCAA Gymnastics Champions
