= Matthew Alec =

- Born: 9 October 1983 (age 42); Parma, Ohio, US
- Occupation: Musician
- Instrument: saxophone
- Website: www.matthewalec.com

Matthew Alec Tieman (born October 9, 1983, in Parma, Ohio, US) is an American jazz saxophonist, composer, producer, and bandleader based in Cleveland, Ohio. He is the founder of Cleveland Time Records and the leader of the jazz fusion ensemble Matthew Alec and The Soul Electric.

Alec has been recognized for his work in contemporary jazz fusion and funk-based jazz, blending elements of soul, rock, and improvisational jazz. His recordings and performances have received coverage from publications including All About Jazz, Jazziz, SoulTracks, and Glide Magazine.

== Biography ==
He was born on October 9, 1983, in Parma, Ohio and was raised in the small town of Richfield, Ohio. Matthew graduated in 2007 with Bachelor of Arts in Music degree with concentration in classical saxophone on Kent State University in 2007. He studied both classical music and jazz with the famous saxophonist Greg Banaszak. Cleveland Magazine nominated him as Best Horn Player in Cleveland in 2009.

== Career ==
Alec began his professional music career in Northeast Ohio as a founding member of the Cleveland-based soul and funk group Winslow. Active during the late 2000s and early 2010s, the band became known regionally for its blend of funk, rock, and soul influences and performed extensively throughout the United States.

During his tenure with Winslow, Alec performed alongside artists and groups including Earth, Wind & Fire, Incubus, Robert Randolph and the Family Band, Average White Band, Lupe Fiasco, O.A.R., Ozomatli, Rusted Root, Bret Michaels, and Keane. The group released the albums Crazy Kind of Love (2008), which featured Parliament-Funkadelic keyboardist Bernie Worrell, and Left of the Right Direction (2013), which Alec co-produced.

Following the dissolution of Winslow, Alec formed the jazz fusion ensemble Matthew Alec and The Soul Electric. The group combines jazz fusion, funk, soul, pop, and improvisational music, and has featured musicians including Brian Woods, Steven Forrest Sanders, Jared Lees, Leon Henault, Jeremiah Hawkins, and guest collaborators such as Tom “Bones” Malone.

In 2020, Alec founded '''Cleveland Time Records''', an independent record label focused on promoting jazz and contemporary instrumental musicians from Northeast Ohio.

In 2021, Matthew Alec and The Soul Electric released their debut studio album, Cleveland Time, through Cleveland Time Records. The album featured trombonist Tom “Bones” Malone, former musical director for Saturday Night Live, and received coverage from publications including All About Jazz, Jazziz, SoulTracks, Glide Magazine, and Cleveland Scene. The album also charted on U.S. and Canadian jazz radio charts, reaching the Top 20 on the NACC Jazz Chart.

Several singles from the album, including Give What You Take, Baby You Got Me, and Cleveland Time, received national jazz media coverage and streaming distribution.

In 2022, the group released the live album Live at the Bop Stop!, followed by Soul Jazz Classics: Live in 2018 in 2023. The recordings further expanded Alec’s profile within the contemporary jazz fusion and groove-based jazz scenes.

In 2024, Alec was included in All About Jazz's readers poll ranking of Favorite Living Jazz Saxophonists, where he placed No. 19. During the same period, Matthew Alec and The Soul Electric were nominated in the “Best Jazz” category at the Cleveland Music Awards.

In 2025, the group released its fourth album, A Bad Rep in the Rubber City, a hybrid release comprising both studio and live recordings. The studio tracks, Blue Train and Gravity, were accompanied by live performances recorded by the ensemble. The album featured guest appearances from Grammy-nominated saxophonist Greg Banaszak, singer-songwriter Jeremy Voltz, and hip-hop artist Minus the Alien, and continued Alec’s fusion-oriented approach, combining jazz improvisation with elements of funk, soul, and popular music.

== Recognition ==
Alec was nominated for “Best Horn Player” by ''Cleveland Scene Magazine'' in 2009.

In 2021, the debut album Cleveland Time received international jazz press coverage and charted on college and independent jazz radio stations in the United States and Canada.

Alec’s composition Blues for McCoy was later recognized as a semifinalist in the International Songwriting Competition.

In 2024, Alec was ranked No. 19 in All About Jazz's readers poll for Favorite Living Jazz Saxophonists.

Matthew Alec and The Soul Electric were nominated in the Best Jazz category at the Cleveland Music Awards in both 2024 and 2025.

Music critics have noted Alec’s fusion of funk, soul, and contemporary jazz, with comparisons to artists and groups including Maceo Parker, Tower of Power, and The Greyboy Allstars.

== Discography ==
=== Studio albums ===
- Cleveland Time (2021)
- A Bad Rep in the Rubber City (2025)

=== Live albums ===
- Live at the Bop Stop! (2022)
- Soul Jazz Classics: Live in 2018 (2023)

=== Singles ===
- “Give What You Take” (2020)
- “Baby You Got Me” (2021)
- “Cleveland Time” (2021)
- “Art Triumphed Through Attrition” (2022)
- “The Chicken” (2022)
- “Wanton Imbibement” (2023)
- “Chain of Fools: A Tribute to Aretha Franklin” (2023)
- “Gravity” (2025)
- “Blue Train” (featuring Minus the Alien and Greg Banaszak) (2025)
- “Just the Two of Us” (featuring Jeremy Voltz) (2025)

=== As sideman ===
- ''Crazy Kind of Love'' – Winslow (2008)
- ''Left of the Right Direction'' – Winslow (2013)
- ''Gypsy'' – Lauren Brabson (2022)
- ''Moving Out'' – Miguel Tarin Torres (2023)
- “My Funny Valentine” – Brian Woods (2023)
- ''Queen of Presence'' – Zach (2024)

== Notable performances ==
Notable performances with the group Winslow:

- Tower City Amphitheater (Cleveland)
  - Opening for Incubus (2010)
  - Opening for Earth, Wind, and Fire (2012)
- House of Blues (Cleveland)
  - Opening for Robert Randolph and The Family Band (2010)
  - Opening for Rusted Root (2012)
- Kent State University (Kent, OH)
  - Opening for Lupe Fiasco (2011)
- Headlining Akron's Porch Rokr Festival (2013)
