= Greg Banaszak =

American saxophonist (born 1966)

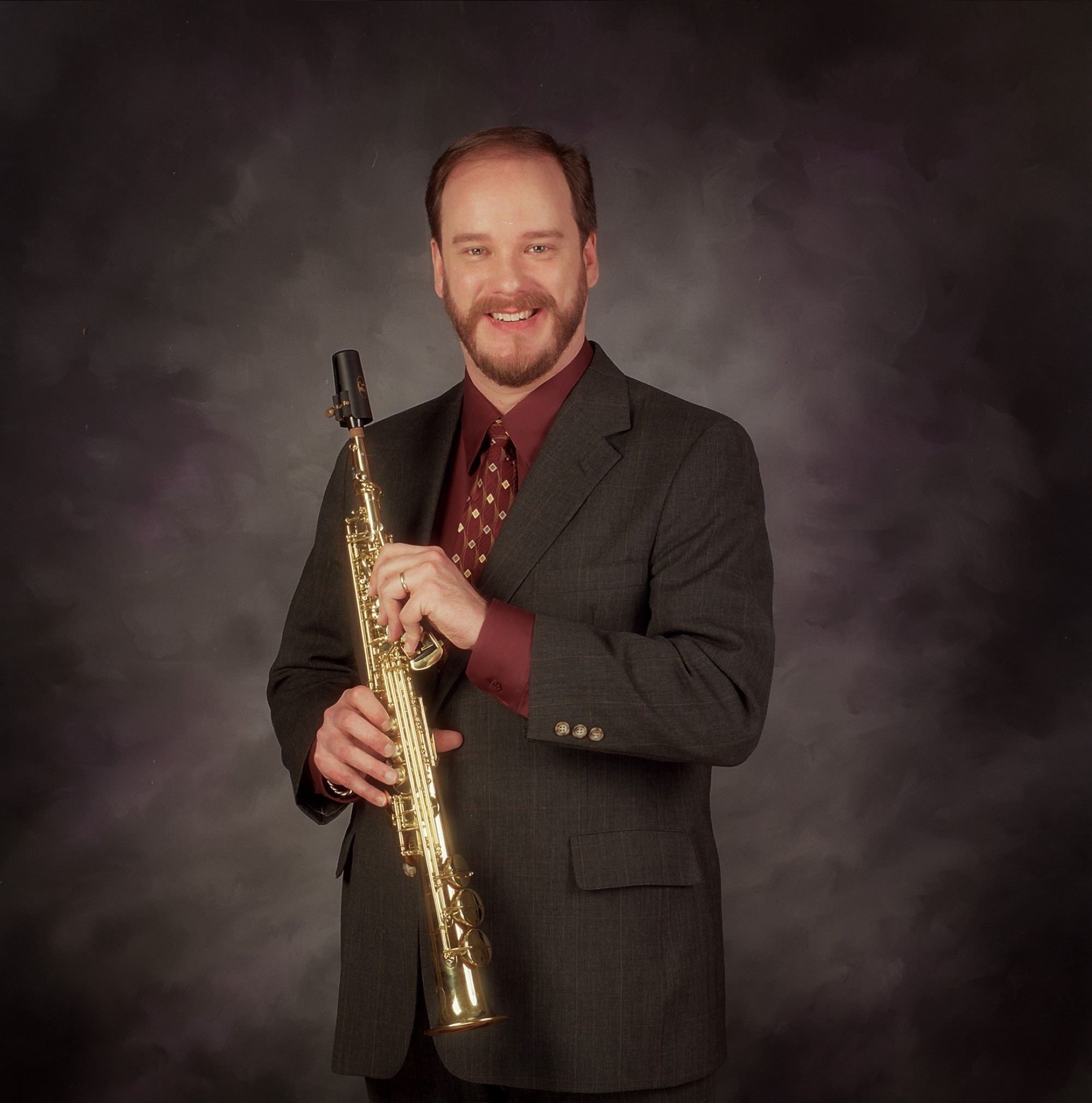

Background information
- Born: June 23, 1966 (age 60)
- Genres: Classical, jazz
- Occupation: Musician
- Instrument: Saxophone
- Years active: 1982–present
- Label: Centaur
- Website: gregbanaszak.com

Greg Banaszak (born June 23, 1966) is an American saxophonist specializing in classical music and jazz. He has performed in both styles through concerto performances, solo, and chamber music recitals and jazz festivals in the United States, Eastern and Western Europe, the Middle East, and Asia.

== Career ==
Banaszak received bachelor's degree from the Hartt School of Music, a master's degree from the Fryderyk Chopin University of Music in Warsaw, and an Artist Diploma from the Centre Musical d’Annecy in France.

Banaszak is a faculty member of the Cleveland Institute of Music, Case Western Reserve University, and previously Lutheran High School West. In 2001, he was appointed to the National Academy of Recording Arts and Sciences as a voting member for the annual Grammy Awards.

Recording primarily for Centaur since 1999, he has also produced albums for Chanson, Hyperion and Open Loop.

== Discography ==
- The Glazunov Concerto, Katowice State Symphony Orchestra (Chanson, 1991)
- Double Vision with Christopher Casey (Open Loop, 1995)
- Saxophone Concertos, Polish National Chamber Orchestra (Centaur, 1999)
- Romances for Saxophone and Orchestra, Beethoven Academy Orchestra of Krakow (Centaur, 2008)
- Bird w/Strings Revisited, Gorzow Philharmonic Orchestra (Polonia Jazz, 2011)
- Concertos for Saxophone and Orchestra (Centaur, 2011)
- Duo Concertos for Alto Saxophone, Flute and Orchestra, Podlaise Symphony Orchestra (Centaur, 2011)
- Neo-Ragtime: The Music of Brian Dykstra (Centaur, 2012)
