= Jill Macoska =

American scientist and professor

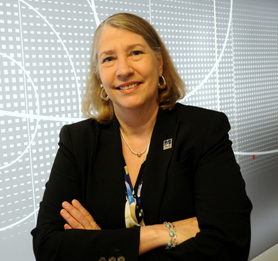
- Education: CUNY Graduate Center (Ph.D.)
- Scientific career
- Workplaces: University of Massachusetts Boston

Jill A. Macoska is an American scientist and professor. She is the Alton J. Brann endowed chair and distinguished professor of science and mathematics at the University of Massachusetts Boston.

== Education ==
Macoska earned a B.A. in physical anthropology from Kent State University (1978). She holds an M.Phil. (1986) and Ph.D. in biochemistry (1988) from the Graduate Center of the City University of New York. She completed postdoctoral work at Harvard University in molecular genetics and at the Michigan Cancer Foundation.

== Career and research ==
Macoska is the Alton J. Brann Distinguished Professor in Science and Mathematics, and Professor of Biological Sciences at University of Massachusetts Boston. For the past 20 years, her research has focused on elucidating the molecular genetic alterations and dysfunctional intracellular signaling mechanisms that promote prostate pathobiology. Macoska serves as the first director of the Center for Personalized Cancer Therapy.
