= Nancy Stockall =

American academic

Nancy Stockall (Haas) is an Full Professor of Early Childhood Studies and Special Education at Sam Houston State University.

== Life ==
Stockall has worked at the University of Arkansas at Fort Smith, the University of Arkansas and at Bowling Green State University in Bowling Green, Ohio. Before obtaining her Ph.D. (Ph.D. 1993) from Kent State University, she was general and special education elementary teacher before she became the Special Education Administrator for Massillon City Schools in Ohio. Her dissertation won the 1995 Outstanding Dissertation Award from the American Educational Research Association Early Education for Children with Disabilities.

In 2019 Stockall was given the David Payne Faculty Excellence Award for Civic Engagement from Sam Houston State University. Stockall's research interests relate to the field of semiotics, with special interest in applying semiotic methodology to inform inclusive practices for students with mild disabilities in general education classrooms. She has also worked on numerous projects linking applied semiotics to general early childhood education, human development, counseling and rehabilitation, and aviation studies.

Publications include:

- Right from the Start: Universal design for preschoolers. Teaching Exceptional Children
- Planning Literacy Environments for Diverse Preschoolers. Young Exceptional Children.
- Fathers' Role in Play: Enhancing early language and literacy of children with developmental delays, Early Childhood Education Journal.
- The Daily Dozen: Strategies for Enhancing Social Communication of Infants with Language Delays, Young Children

Additional published work includes:

- Stockall, N., & Dennis, L. R. (2014). Using Pivotal Response Training and Technology to Engage Preschoolers With Autism in Conversations. Intervention in School and Clinic, 49(4), 195–202.
- Stockall, N., & Smith, R. E. (2013). Alternative Assessment Portfolios for Students with Intellectual Disabilities: A Case Study. Exceptionality, 21(3), 127–146.
- Stockall, N. S. (2014). When an Aide Really Becomes an Aid Providing Professional Development for Special Education Paraprofessionals. TEACHING Exceptional Children, 46(6), 197–205.
- Stockall, N., Dennis, L. R., & Rueter, J. A. (2014). Developing a Progress Monitoring Portfolio for Children in Early Childhood Special Education Programs. TEACHING Exceptional Children, 46(3), 32–40.
