= Lyndsay Petruny =

American sports anchor and TV host

- Born: Lyndsay Petruny; February 27, 1986 (age 40); Pittsburgh, Pennsylvania, United States
- Education: Kent State University
- Occupations: Sports anchor, Sideline reporter Sports producer, Television host
- Years active: 2009 – Present
- Parent(s): Joseph and Karen Petruny
- Website: www.lyndsaypetruny.com

Lyndsay Petruny (born February 27, 1986) is an American sports anchor, sideline reporter, sports producer, and television host. She recently co-hosted Inside the Bears and reported for Bears Gameday Live on FOX Chicago. She was also the Chicago Bears' sideline reporter. Petruny previously worked for FOX Sports Network, Big Ten Network, CBS Pittsburgh, The CW Pittsburgh, Comcast SportsNet, CBS Boston, and Kraft Sports Productions, the in-house production company for the New England Patriots.

== Background ==
Petruny was born on February 27, 1986, in Pittsburgh, Pennsylvania, United States to parents of school teachers, Joseph and Karen Petruny.

She attended college at Kent State University in Kent, Ohio, in 2004. She graduated in 2008 with a degree in Broadcast journalism. Before her graduation, she produced and hosted programs aired by Kent State University's TV2, reaching 25,000 residents on Time Warner Cable. Petruny co-hosted NewsOhio, a weekly civics show, on WVIZ-TV while still in college. She also worked for FOX Sports Network as an intern at both the assignment desk and in the highlights department for FOX Sports Network’s nightly show, the Final Score.

== Career ==
In 2009, Petruny entered the mainstream sports media when she served as a Penn State football correspondent for Big Ten Tonight on Big Ten Network. In the same year, she co-hosted a weekly sports talk show called Steelers Saturday Night together with Bob Pompeani, Ellis Cannon, and Pete Gonzalez on Pittsburgh’s CW. She was also involved in production at CBS Pittsburgh, for the Subway Nightly Sports Call.

In 2010, Petruny joined the daily sports webcast of Patriots Today, a program produced by Kraft Sports Productions, as a reporter. The show gives fans a daily in-depth look at the New England Patriots and also provides features, reports, commentary, and all the latest news on the team. Later, she hosted Patriots This Week on Comcast SportsNet New England, a weekly show giving a thorough recap of each week’s news and developments featuring debriefs together with Scott Zolak. She served as a reporter for Patriots All Access, an Emmy award-winning weekly show aired on CBS Boston. She also hosted Totally Patriots, a youth-oriented football show also aired on CBS Boston.

In August 2013, Petruny began sideline reporting for the Chicago Bears at Soldier Field. She provides injury updates, stats, scores and highlights from games around the NFL, and interviews with players and coaches live from the field or outside the locker room. She co-hosts a year-round magazine show, Inside the Bears on FOX Chicago with Anthony Adams, former American football defensive tackle of the Chicago Bears. In addition, Petruny will be reporting for Bears Gameday Live on the same network.

Petruny also has public relations, social media, and website building experience and has worked for a digital marketing company in San Diego, California. She has done modeling work and completed projects for companies such as Dick's Sporting Goods, Fisher-Price, Pittsburgh Post-Gazette, and the Pennsylvania Lottery. Petruny has event planning and marketing experience, previously working as a logistics coordinator for Dream Careers Inc. in Los Angeles, California.

== Recognitions ==
Petruny was named by Heavy, an entertainment website, as one of the "20 Hottest Sports Reporters." She was selected by the Bleacher Report, an American digital sports media network, as one of the "50 Hottest Brunettes in Sports," as one of "The 40 Hottest College Football Reporters," and as one of "The Loveliest Ladies of Media Day at Super Bowl 2012." She was also predicted to become the next Erin Andrews by the Bleacher Report.
