= Robert Risko =

American caricature artist (born 1956)

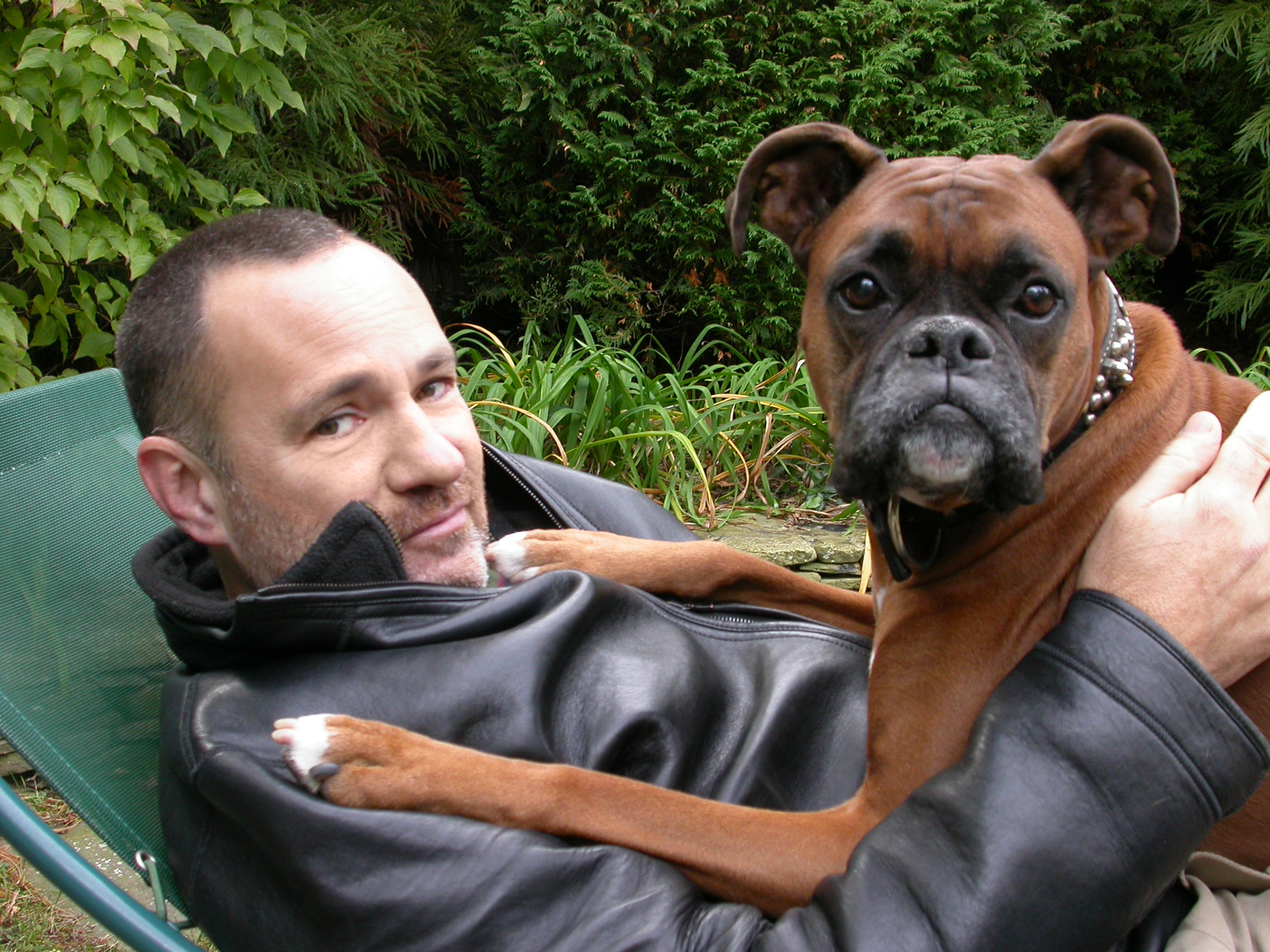
- Born: November 11, 1956 (age 70) Ellwood City, Pennsylvania, U.S.
- Area: Caricaturist

Robert Risko (born November 11, 1956, in Ellwood City, Pennsylvania) is an American caricature artist known for his retro airbrush style. Risko's style embodies the spirit of the 1930s Vanity Fair caricaturists Miguel Covarrubias and Paolo Garretto. During his career he has created caricatures of a large number of celebrities which have appeared in a number of major american magazines.

== Career ==
Risko started his art career mentored by Andy Warhol, moving from Pittsburg to New York City from Pittsburgh. He started drawing celebrity portraits for Warhol's Interview magazine such as one of Dolly Parton. Risko was influenced by the shiny aesthetic of the 1970s and the Art Deco revival taking place in New York City at the time.

At 25, Risko was chosen by renowned art director Bea Feitler along with Rolling Stone photographer Annie Leibovitz and artist Keith Haring to define the look of the new Vanity Fair when the magazine was relaunched in 1983. He has been a contributor ever since and has been instrumental in not only shaping Vanity Fair's unique look by contemporizing the spirit of the Bauhaus with his style but revealing personality traits of his subjects by reducing them to their essence with a few stylized colored shapes.

In addition to Vanity Fair, Risko's work is published regularly in many major magazines, including The New Yorker, Rolling Stone, Playboy, Esquire, and Interview, and was seen on VH1's Pop 200 Icons Countdown. He illustrated the packaging for the Capitol Sings composer series, and HBO's Comedy Club video series. As part of his work he has created caricatures of many notable people.

Risko has been published in books such as Fame (1979), Fame II (1981), and The Risko Book, published by the Monacelli Press ISBN 978-1580930727 in 2000, which collected 180 of his pieces. His latest book is Vanity Fair's Proust Questionnaire: 101 Luminaries Ponder Love, Death, Happiness, and the Meaning of Life (Rodale, 2009).

In October 2017, the Kennedy Center held an exhibition of Risko's work that he had created for the Mark Twain Prize for American Humor, an activity that he has done since 2002.

== Books (author or illustrator) ==
- Risko, Robert; Sessums, Kevin (2000). The Risko book. New York: Monacelli Press. ISBN 978-1-58093-072-7.
- Carter, Graydon (2017). Vanity Fair's" Proust Questionnaire: 100 Luminaries Ponder Love, Death, Happiness, and the Meaning of Life. Ilustrados Ser. Virginia Collera, Robert Risko (1st ed.). Madrid: Nordica Libros. ISBN 9781605295954.
