= Kent State Golden Flashes =

Intercollegiate sports teams of Kent State University

- University: Kent State University
- Nickname: Golden Flashes
- NCAA: Division I (FBS)
- Conference: Mid-American
- Athletic director: Randale Richmond
- Location: Kent, Ohio
- Varsity teams: 19 (8 men's, 11 women's)
- Football stadium: Dix Stadium
- Basketball arena: Memorial Athletic and Convocation Center
- Baseball stadium: Schoonover Stadium
- Softball stadium: Devine Diamond
- Soccer stadium: Zoeller Field at Dix Stadium
- Lacrosse stadium: Dix Stadium
- Golf course: Windmill Lakes
- Outdoor track and field venue: Kent State Outdoor Track
- Colors: Navy blue and gold
- Mascot: Flash the Golden Eagle
- Fight song: "Fight on for KSU"
- Website: kentstatesports.com

The Kent State Golden Flashes are the athletic teams that represent Kent State University. The university fields 19 varsity athletic teams in the National Collegiate Athletic Association (NCAA) at the Division I level with football competing in the Football Bowl Subdivision. Kent State is a full member of the Mid-American Conference (MAC) and has been part of the MAC East division since it was created in 1998. Official school colors are Kent State Blue and Kent State Gold.

Athletic events were held during the first semester at Kent State in late 1913, with several intramural teams for female students and a limited number of opportunities for male students. Early men's athletic events, in basketball and baseball, were played against local high school, church, and company teams. The first intercollegiate athletic event, a men's basketball game, was held in January 1915 and the baseball team held their first intercollegiate game later that year. A dedicated athletic field was built around 1920 and the school's first gymnasium opened in 1925. Football also debuted as a sport in 1920, followed by wrestling, men's tennis, men's gymnastics, and men's swimming. Joe Kotys, fresh off an appearance in the 1948 Summer Olympics, was dominant for the Golden Flashes in NCAA competition during this period accruing six individual men's gymnastics championships between 1949 and 1951. From 1932 to 1951, Kent State competed as a member of the Ohio Athletic Conference before joining the Mid-American Conference in 1951. The school's first permanent football stadium and a new basketball gym opened in 1950.

Although women's intramural athletics had been part of the university since it was first established, the first women's intercollegiate athletic team was not established until 1964 when the women's gymnastics team, the first women's collegiate gymnastics team in the U.S., began intercollegiate competition after being founded in 1959. Additional women's sports, including swimming, field hockey, basketball, and volleyball, were added as varsity sports in the mid-1970s following the passage and implementation of Title IX. Budget constraints and other factors led to the university dropping swimming, tennis, ice hockey, and men's soccer during the 1980s and 1990s, with ice hockey becoming a club-level sport in the American Collegiate Hockey Association (ACHA) Division I as part of College Hockey Mid-America (CHMA). The most recent changes occurred in the late 1990s when women's golf and women's soccer were added as varsity sports, followed by the addition of women's lacrosse, which began play in 2019. A women's wrestling team is scheduled to begin competition in 2027–28. The team will be the first NCAA Division I women's collegiate wrestling team in Ohio and fifth in the U.S.

Several Kent State athletic teams have enjoyed success in the Mid-American Conference and at the national level over the years and the university has produced individual national champions in both wrestling and track and field. Both the men's and women's golf teams have been the most successful in MAC play having won the most conference titles in MAC history through 2017. The men's golf team has also finished as high as 5th nationally in 2012 to go with 6th and 9th-place finishes, while the women's golf team also claimed a 5th place finish in 2017. Additionally, the men's basketball team made a notable run to the Elite Eight in 2002, the baseball team advanced to the College World Series in 2012, and the softball team qualified for the Women's College World Series in 1990. Kent State also has had high national finishes from the men's indoor and outdoor track and field teams, women's gymnastics, and wrestling. A number of Golden Flashes alumni have gone on to play and coach in both college and major professional sports, such as Jack Lambert, Antonio Gates, Nick Saban, Lou Holtz, Thurmon Munson, and Emmanuel Burriss.

== History ==
Athletics at Kent State began shortly after the school was first organized in 1910 and the first classes held in 1912. The school's first sporting event was a men's basketball game in 1913 against Kent High School and the following spring (1914) the baseball team was organized, known as the "Normal Nine". The football team followed in 1920 and held their first game on October 30, a 6–0 loss to Ashland College. Around this same time, the teams became known as the "Silver Foxes" because then-president John Edward McGilvrey raised silver foxes on his farm east of campus. After McGilvrey's controversial firing in 1926, the new administration held a contest to choose a different team name and "Golden Flashes" was chosen, though no significance was included in the name. The first use of "Golden Flashes" occurred in 1927 after it was approved by the student body and faculty athletic committee. The school colors are officially defined as "Kent State blue" and "Kent State gold", which are shades of Navy blue and gold. The original school colors, as chosen by the school's first president John Edward McGilvrey, were orange and blue, believed to have been inspired by the school colors for the University of Illinois at Urbana–Champaign, where McGilvrey had been a professor. Gold was also used with blue during the 1920s. A committee formally set the colors as royal blue and gold in 1925. Kent State was a member of the Ohio Athletic Conference from 1932 to 1951 and joined the Mid-American Conference in 1951.

=== National placements ===
Although no Kent State team has won a national title in any sport, several Golden Flashes teams have placed highly in NCAA national tournaments. The program has also produced individual national champions in men's and women's track and field, men's gymnastics, and wrestling. Notable national team finishes include:

- Men's basketball: tie-5th (2002)
- Men's golf: 9th (2000); 6th (2008); tie-5th (2012)
- Men's indoor track and field: 5th (1972), 2nd (1973)
- Men's outdoor track and field: 6th (1972 and 1973)
- Baseball: tie-5th (2012) (CWS Appearance)
- Gymnastics:12th (2011) 1st MAC Team to ever qualify for the National Championships
- Softball: 7th (1990)
- Wrestling: 5th (1941 and 1942)
- Co-ed cheerleading: 8th (2008); 9th (2009)

== Sports sponsored ==
Mid-American Conference logo in Kent State's colors. Kent State joined the MAC in 1951

Kent State sponsors 19 athletic teams at the NCAA Division I level, with eight for men and 11 for women. All current teams compete in the Mid-American Conference. The academic year is divided into three seasons, with the fall sports season typically lasting from August into December, the winter sports season going from late November into March, and the spring sports season beginning in early March and ending in June.

Fall sports are football, women's field hockey, women's soccer, women's volleyball, men's and women's golf, and men's and women's cross country. During the winter sports season, Kent State has men's and women's basketball, women's gymnastics, men's wrestling, and men's and women's indoor track and field. The spring sports season features men's and women's golf, baseball, women's lacrosse, softball, and men's and women's outdoor track & field.

Both men's and women's golf compete in tournaments around the country in both the fall and spring seasons, with MAC and NCAA championship play held in the spring season.

In December 2025, Kent State announced that women's wrestling, which graduated from the NCAA Emerging Sports for Women program to full championship status in 2025–26, would be added in 2027–28. The team will be the fifth women's wrestling team established in the United States and first in Ohio.

Men's sports	Women's sports
Baseball	Basketball
Basketball	Cross country
Cross country	Field hockey
Football	Golf
Golf	Gymnastics
Track and field^{1}	Lacrosse
Wrestling	Soccer
	Softball
	Track and field^{1}
	Volleyball
	Wrestling (2027–28)
^{1} – includes both indoor and outdoor.

=== Baseball ===
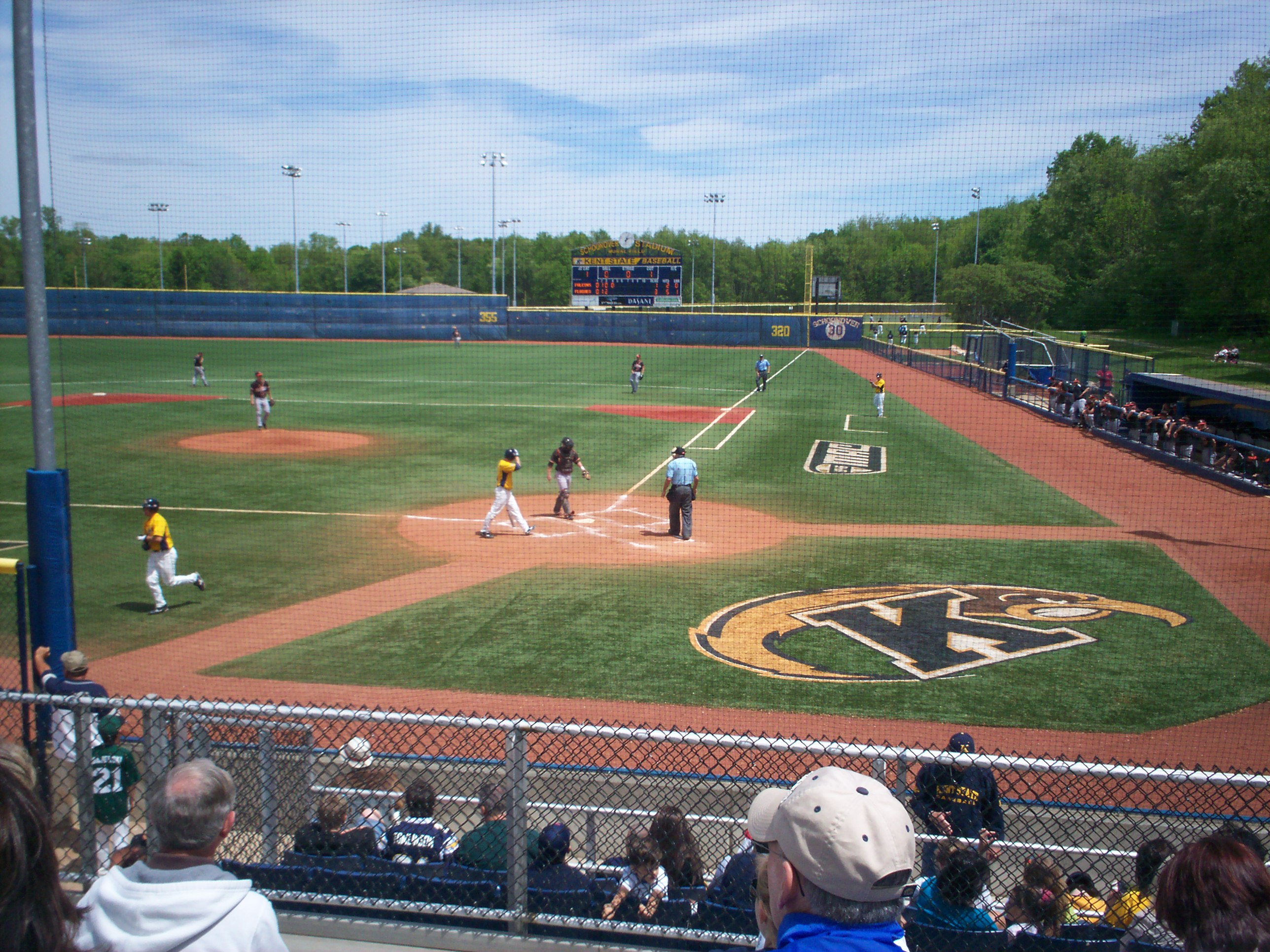
Kent State baseball game at Olga Mural Field at Schoonover Stadium in 2010

The baseball team is Kent State's second oldest sport, though it is the school's oldest intercollegiate team. Formed in 1914, they were known originally as the "Normal Nine" as the school was originally known as Kent State Normal School. The team has enjoyed significant success both in the Mid-American Conference and on the national level and has sent several players to the major leagues over the years. The team's home field is Schoonover Stadium, which opened in 2005 on the site of the team's previous home, Gene Michael Field. The coach is Jeff Duncan, who was hired as coach after the 2013 season. Through the 2023 season, the team has 12 MAC East titles, 16 MAC regular-season titles, 12 MAC tournament titles, and 13 NCAA tournament appearances. In 2012, the team made its first appearances in both the Super Regional round of the NCAA baseball tournament and the College World Series.

- MAC East division titles: 2000, 2003, 2006, 2007, 2008, 2010, 2011, 2012, 2013, 2015, 2016, 2017
- MAC overall titles: 1964, 1992, 1993, 1994, 1996, 2001, 2002, 2003, 2006, 2008, 2011, 2012, 2016, 2017, 2018, 2023
- MAC tournament titles: 1992, 1993, 2001, 2002, 2004, 2007, 2009, 2010, 2011, 2012, 2014, 2018
- NCAA tournament appearances: 1964, 1992, 1993, 1994, 2001, 2002, 2004, 2007, 2009, 2010, 2011, 2012, 2014
- College World Series appearances: 2012

=== Men's basketball ===
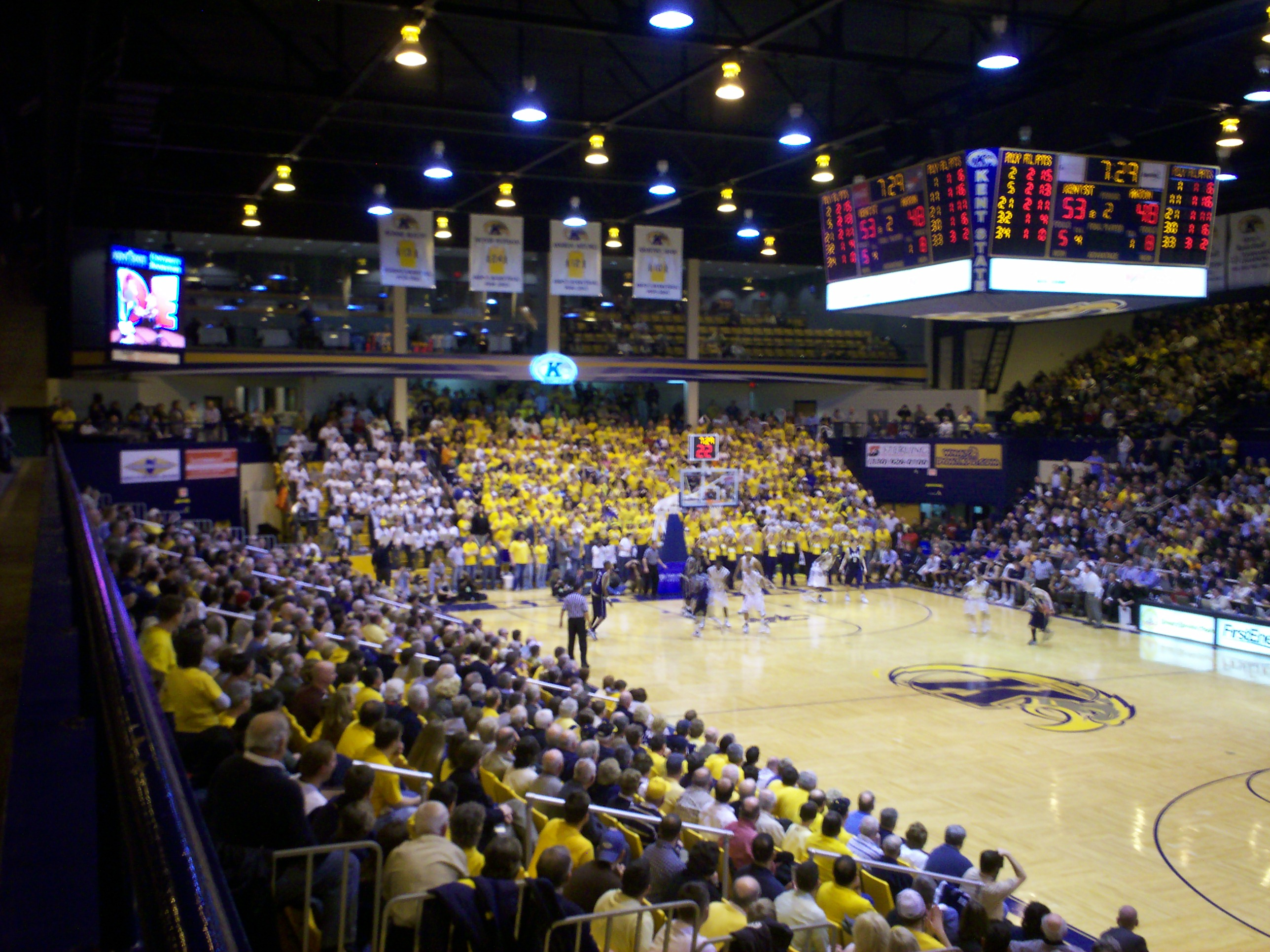
January 23, 2008 men's basketball game at the MAC Center

The men's basketball team, which began play in 1913 and intercollegiate competition in 1914, plays in the Memorial Athletic and Convocation Center and is Kent State's oldest sport and second-oldest intercollegiate team. After decades of near anonymity, since 1998 the team has been one of the most consistent in the Mid-American Conference with a league record ten straight twenty-win seasons from the 1998–99 season through the 2007–08 season (the previous record was five straight). Kent State was one of only eight NCAA Division I men's basketball programs in the United States to have ten consecutive seasons with twenty or more wins. Kent State also holds the MAC record for consecutive seasons with double-digit conference wins, also for ten consecutive seasons (the previous record was eight straight), and in 2002 finished 17–1 in conference play, setting a MAC record for conference wins in a season. The Flashes amassed thirty victories in the 2001–02 season which culminated in a berth in the NCAA Elite Eight. In the tournament they defeated seventh-seeded Oklahoma State, second-seeded Alabama, and third-seeded Pitt. One of the stars on this team, power forward Antonio Gates, went on to become a Hall of Famer in a different sport, football, as a tight end with the San Diego/Los Angeles Chargers. Kent State has made 14 MAC tournament title game appearances (most in conference history) and has won seven (tied for most in the conference), along with six regular-season MAC titles and nine MAC East titles.

- MAC East division titles: 2001, 2002, 2003, 2004, 2006, 2008, 2010, 2011, 2015
- MAC overall titles: 2002, 2006, 2008, 2010, 2011, 2015
- MAC Tournament titles: 1999, 2001, 2002, 2006, 2008, 2017, 2023
- NCAA tournament appearances: 1999, 2001, 2002, 2006, 2008, 2017, 2023
- NIT appearances: 1985, 1989, 1990, 2000, 2003, 2004, 2005, 2010, 2011, 2025
- Other postseason appearances: 2009, 2012, 2013, 2015, 2019, 2022

=== Women's basketball ===
The women's basketball team, which began play during the 1975–1976 season, also plays home games at the Memorial Athletic and Convocation Center. Since 2016, they are coached by Todd Starkey. They have nine MAC East titles, six MAC overall titles, and four MAC tournament titles. In addition, they have six NCAA tournament appearances, the most recent being in 2024, and three WNIT appearances. Kent State has appeared in 12 MAC Tournament championship games, including seven in a row from 1996 through 2002. In fact, the 1996 to 2001 MAC title games all featured Kent State vs. Toledo. In 1998, Kent State became one of only two MAC schools to complete the regular season and tournament with a perfect record, going 18-0 in the regular season and winning the conference tournament.

- MAC East division titles: 1998, 1999, 2000, 2001, 2002, 2005, 2006, 2017, 2020
- MAC overall titles: 1981, 1996, 1998, 1999, 2000, 2002
- MAC Tournament titles: 1981, 1998, 2000, 2002, 2024
- NCAA tournament appearances: 1982, 1996, 1998, 2000, 2002, 2024
- WNIT appearances: 2004, 2022, 2023

=== Field hockey ===
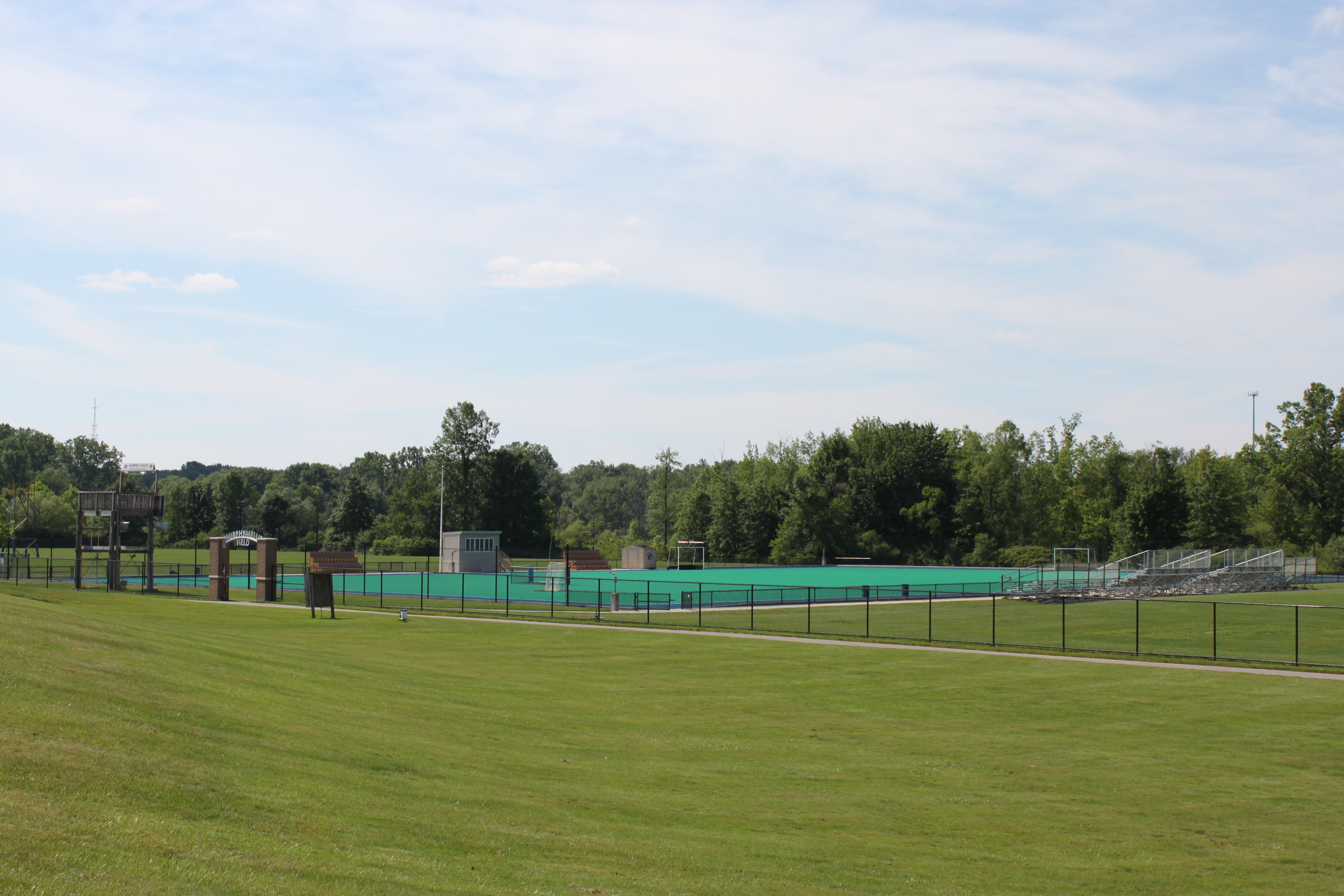
Murphy-Mellis Field

The field hockey team plays its home matches at Murphy-Mellis Field, which opened in 2005 and is adjacent to Dix Stadium. The team has won 14 MAC titles, with the most recent in 2016, and has 12 MAC tournament titles and NCAA appearances, the most recent being in 2016. In 2001, Kent State hosted the NCAA Division I Field Hockey Championship at Dix Stadium, where they played their home games from 1997 through 2004.

- MAC titles: 1988, 1991, 1992, 1999, 2000, 2003, 2004, 2005, 2008, 2009, 2010, 2014, 2015, 2016
- MAC tournament titles: 1988, 1991, 1992, 1998, 1999, 2000, 2002, 2008, 2010, 2014, 2015, 2016
- NCAA tournament appearances: 1988, 1991, 1992, 1998, 1999, 2000, 2002, 2008, 2010, 2014, 2015, 2016

=== Football ===
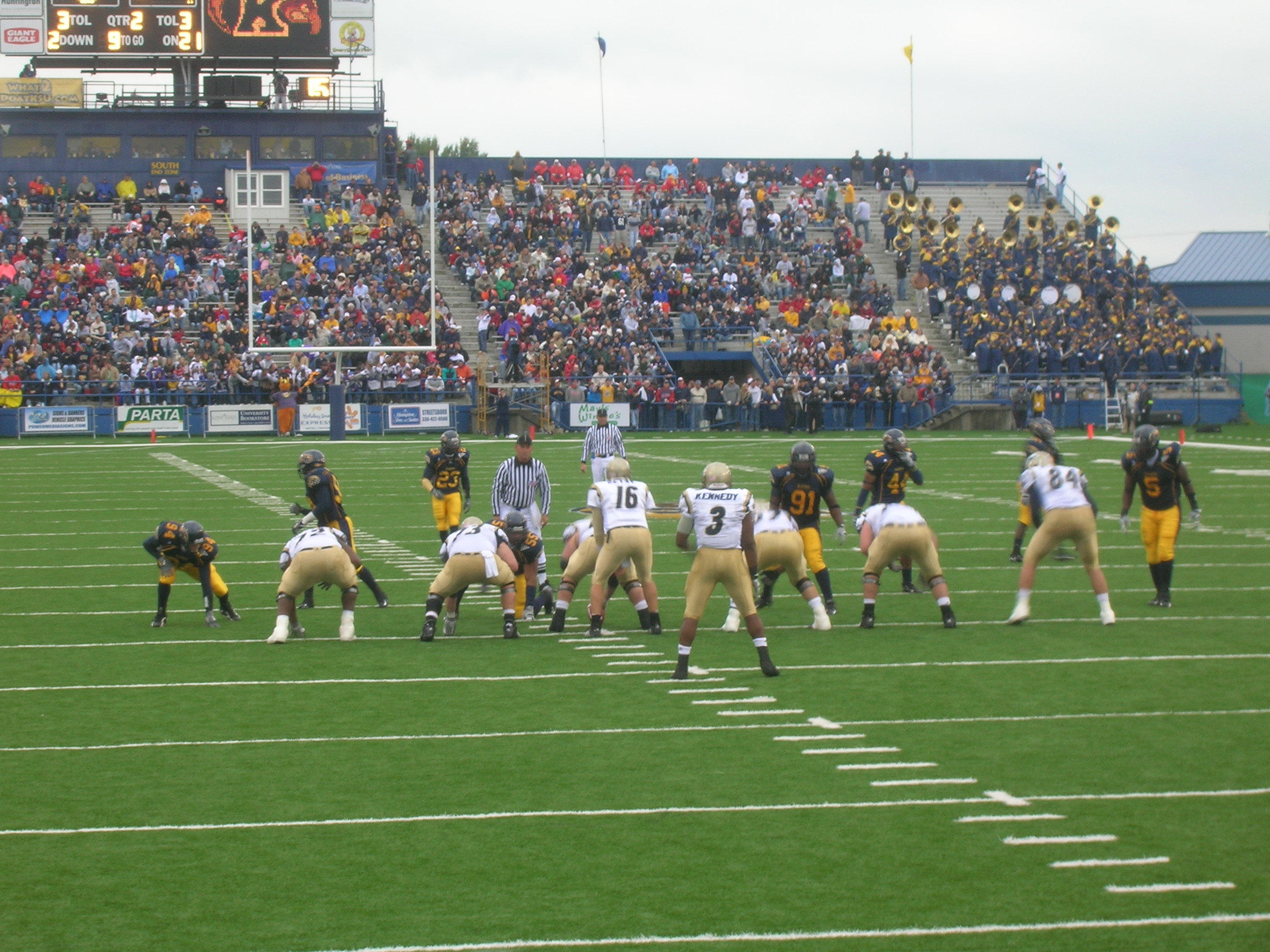
September 26, 2006 football game against the Akron Zips at Dix Stadium.

The Golden Flashes football team plays in the NCAA Division I Football Bowl Subdivision. Home games are played at Dix Stadium on the far eastern edge of the Kent State campus. Since 2025, the head coach is Mark Carney. Behind Dix Stadium are practice fields, as well as the Kent State Field House, which contains a full indoor football field.

Kent State has five post-season bowl game appearances: the 1954 Refrigerator Bowl, 1972 Tangerine Bowl, 2013 GoDaddy.com Bowl, 2019 Frisco Bowl, and the 2021 Famous Idaho Potato Bowl. After falling in their first three bowl game appearances, the 2019 Frisco Bowl was the program's first bowl game victory, a 51–41 win over Utah State.

Although the team has not enjoyed many winning seasons, Kent State has sent several players to the National Football League as well as in other areas of college football and professional football. Don James coached the team from 1971–1974 during the era which also saw future NFL great Jack Lambert and current Alabama head coach Nick Saban playing for the Golden Flashes and Kent State's only Mid-American Conference championship in 1972. Some of the NFL players who played football at Kent State include Dri Archer, Joshua Cribbs, Julian Edelman, and James Harrison. In addition, Antonio Gates, who played for the Kent State men's basketball team, played in the NFL for 16 seasons and is a member of the Pro Football Hall of Fame. Other notable football alumni and former coaches include current ESPN analyst and former Notre Dame and South Carolina head coach Lou Holtz, former Houston Texans head coach and Green Bay Packers defensive coordinator Dom Capers (graduate assistant at Kent State), former Toronto Argonauts standout Jim Corrigall (who also served as head coach at Kent State) and Gary Pinkel, former head coach of the Missouri Tigers from 2001 to 2015.

- MAC overall titles: 1972
- MAC East Division titles: 2012, 2021
- Bowl appearances: 1954, 1972, 2012, 2019, 2021
- Bowl wins: 2019

=== Men's golf ===
The men's golf team has had success both in the Mid-American Conference and at the national level, winning 28 MAC titles and making 36 appearances in the NCAA tournament, including 23 trips to the championship round and three regional championships, as of 2022. They practice at Windmill Lakes Golf Club in nearby Ravenna, where they occasionally host matches. The program has produced several pro-golfers and in 2003, former Golden Flashes standout Ben Curtis won the British Open in what ABC commentator Mike Tirico called "one of the most amazing stories in the history of the Open Championship" and the "all-time Cinderella story." The team is coached by Jon Mills, a Kent State alum who has been head coach since 2019. He succeeded Herb Page, a KSU alum who coached from 1978 to 2019. Page led the Flashes to 21 of their 24 MAC titles, their three regional titles, and 26 of their 28 trips to NCAA competition. In 2008, he coached Kent State to its highest finish ever at the national level, finishing 6th in the country at the NCAA championship as well as a ninth-place NCAA finish in 2000. Page has been named MAC Coach of the Year 20 times through 2017 and NCAA district IV Coach of the Year eight times.

In mid–2007, Kent State opened the Ferrara and Page Golf Training and Learning Facility located in Franklin Township adjacent to the former Kent State Golf Course. The facility includes a 350-yard outdoor practice range, outdoor practice tees, and outdoor short-game practice areas as well as an indoor putting and chipping area, a video analysis room, and a science and motion putt lab. In addition, the rear of the facility features heated stalls which allow team members to access the driving range even during the winter months to provide year-round training for both the men's and women's teams.

- Ohio Athletic Conference titles: 1934, 1950
- MAC titles: 1954^, 1968, 1977, 1984, 1992^, 1993, 1994, 1995, 1997, 1998, 1999, 2000, 2001, 2003, 2005, 2006, 2009, 2010, 2011, 2012, 2013, 2014, 2016, 2017, 2018, 2019, 2021, 2022, 2025
- NCAA appearances: 1947*, 1949*, 1951*, 1954*, 1977, 1984*, 1987*, 1989, 1990*, 1991, 1992*, 1993*, 1994*, 1995*, 1996, 1998*, 1999, 2000*, 2001*, 2003, 2004*, 2005, 2006, 2008*, 2009, 2010*, 2011*, 2012*, 2013*, 2014, 2016, 2017*, 2018*, 2019, 2021, 2022
- NCAA regional titles: 1993, 2001, 2010

^=co-champions
*= advanced to championship round

=== Women's golf ===
The women's golf team, founded in late 1998, has enjoyed success from its beginning. Every year of the program's existence it has won the Mid-American Conference title and is so far the only school to win the Mid-American Conference Women's Golf Championships, which began in April 1999. Through 2026, they have advanced to NCAA play for 25 consecutive seasons, reaching the championship round in five of them. In 2017 and 2018, the Flashes finished in a tie for fifth nationally, their highest finish to date, after advancing to match play in the NCAA Division I Women's Golf Championships. while 2008 saw the Flashes win two regular-season tournaments, gain a national ranking of thirteenth, and win their tenth consecutive MAC title by 51 strokes. Their 18th consecutive MAC championship in 2016 set the conference record for most consecutive championships in a sport.

Along with the men's team, they practice at Windmill Lakes Golf Course in Ravenna and the Ferrara and Page Golf Training and Learning Facility in Franklin Township. The team is coached by Casey VanDamme, who began his tenure in August 2021 as the program's fourth head coach.

- MAC titles: 1999, 2000, 2001, 2002, 2003, 2004, 2005, 2006, 2007, 2008, 2009, 2010, 2011, 2012, 2013, 2014, 2015, 2016, 2017, 2018, 2019, 2021, 2022, 2023, 2024, 2025, 2026
- NCAA regional appearances: 2001*, 2002, 2003*, 2004, 2005, 2006*, 2007, 2008, 2009, 2010*, 2011, 2012, 2013, 2014, 2015, 2016, 2017*, 2018*, 2019, 2021, 2022, 2023, 2024, 2025, 2026

*= advanced to championship round

=== Women's gymnastics ===
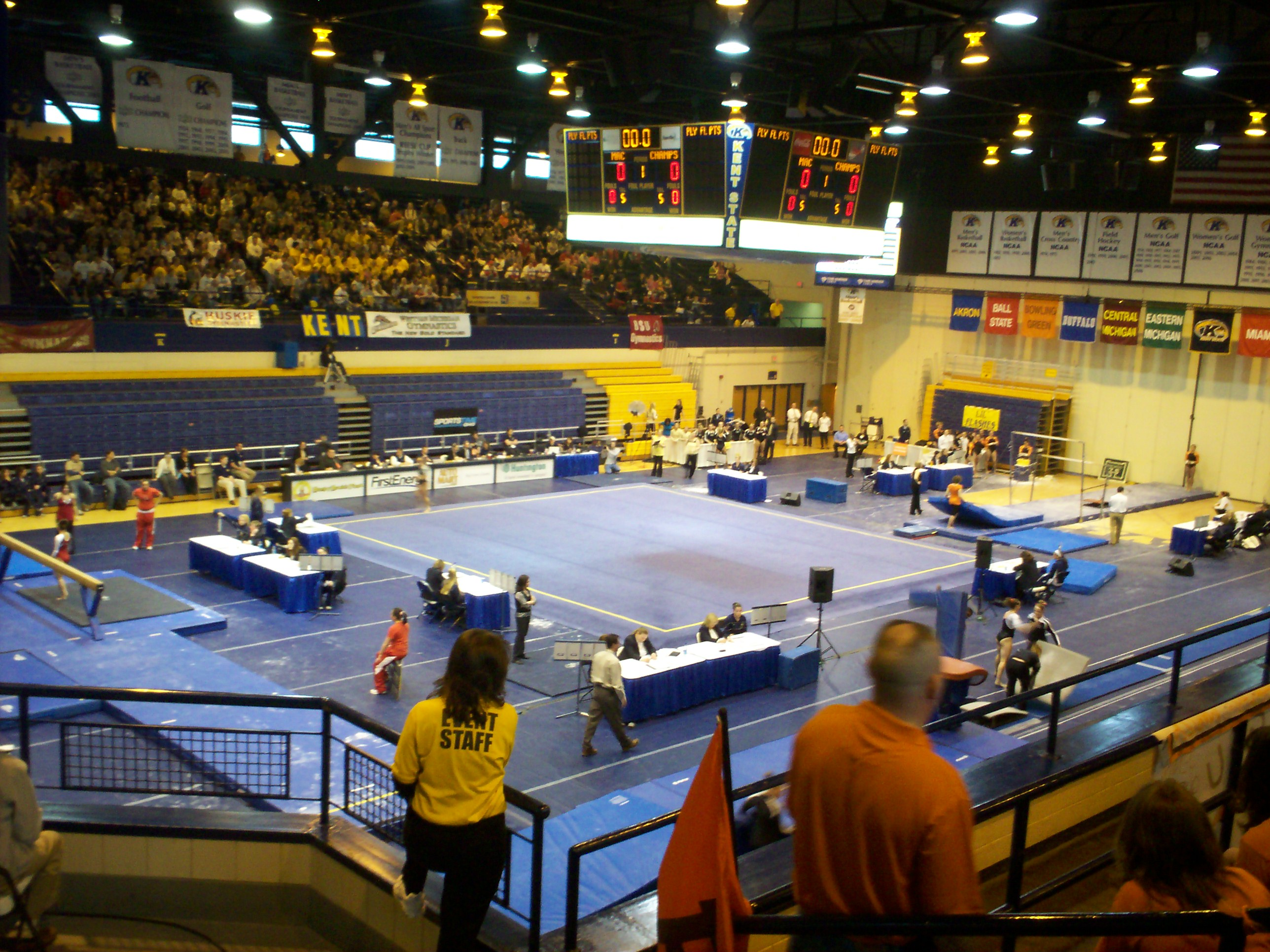
KSU hosted the 2008 MAC Championships, their fifth time hosting and tenth championship meet victory.

First developed in 1959, the Kent State women's gymnastics team was the first women's gymnastics team at the collegiate level. They began intercollegiate competition in 1964 and Mid-American Conference competition in 1981 and have enjoyed consistent success throughout their existence, which includes 11 Mid-American Conference meet championships and 14 regular-season titles. Home meets are held in the MAC Center and the team practices in the MAC Gymnastics Center, an annex on the north side of the building which opened in 1979. The current coach is Brice Biggin, a Kent State alum of the men's gymnastics team who has been coach since 1992. Through the 2013 regular season, he has a record of 342-209 at Kent State. Assistant coaches are Craig Ballard and Josie Angeny.

- Ohio state championships*: 1975, 1976, 1977, 1978
- MAC regular-season titles: 1981, 1984, 1988, 1989, 1994, 1996, 1997, 2001, 2006, 2007, 2008, 2009, 2010, 2013, 2014, 2016, 2024
- MAC championships: 1981, 1984, 1988, 1989, 1994, 1996, 1997, 2001, 2005, 2008, 2009, 2015

* the Ohio state championship was held prior to the Mid-American Conference adding gymnastics as a sport. Occasionally the three remaining Division I teams in Ohio will hold the "All-Ohio Meet".

=== Softball ===
The softball team plays its home games at the Judith K. Devine Diamond, adjacent to Dix Stadium. The team has won six regular season MAC titles and 10 MAC East Division titles, the most recent in 2016, and three MAC Tournament championships, with the most recent in 2017. In 1990, the team went 43–9 en route to their first MAC title, an NCAA regional championship, and a berth in the Women's College World Series. The head coach since August 2015 is Eric Oakley, who came to the program in 2014 as an assistant. The team was established in 1976 and began regular-season play in the Mid-American Conference in 1982 when the MAC added softball as a conference sport.

- MAC East division titles: 1999, 2004, 2006, 2007, 2008, 2009, 2010, 2013, 2015, 2016
- MAC regular-season titles: 1990, 2007, 2008, 2010, 2015, 2016
- MAC tournament titles: 2006, 2008, 2017
- NCAA tournament appearances: 1990, 2006, 2008, 2017
- NCAA regional titles: 1990

=== Men's wrestling ===
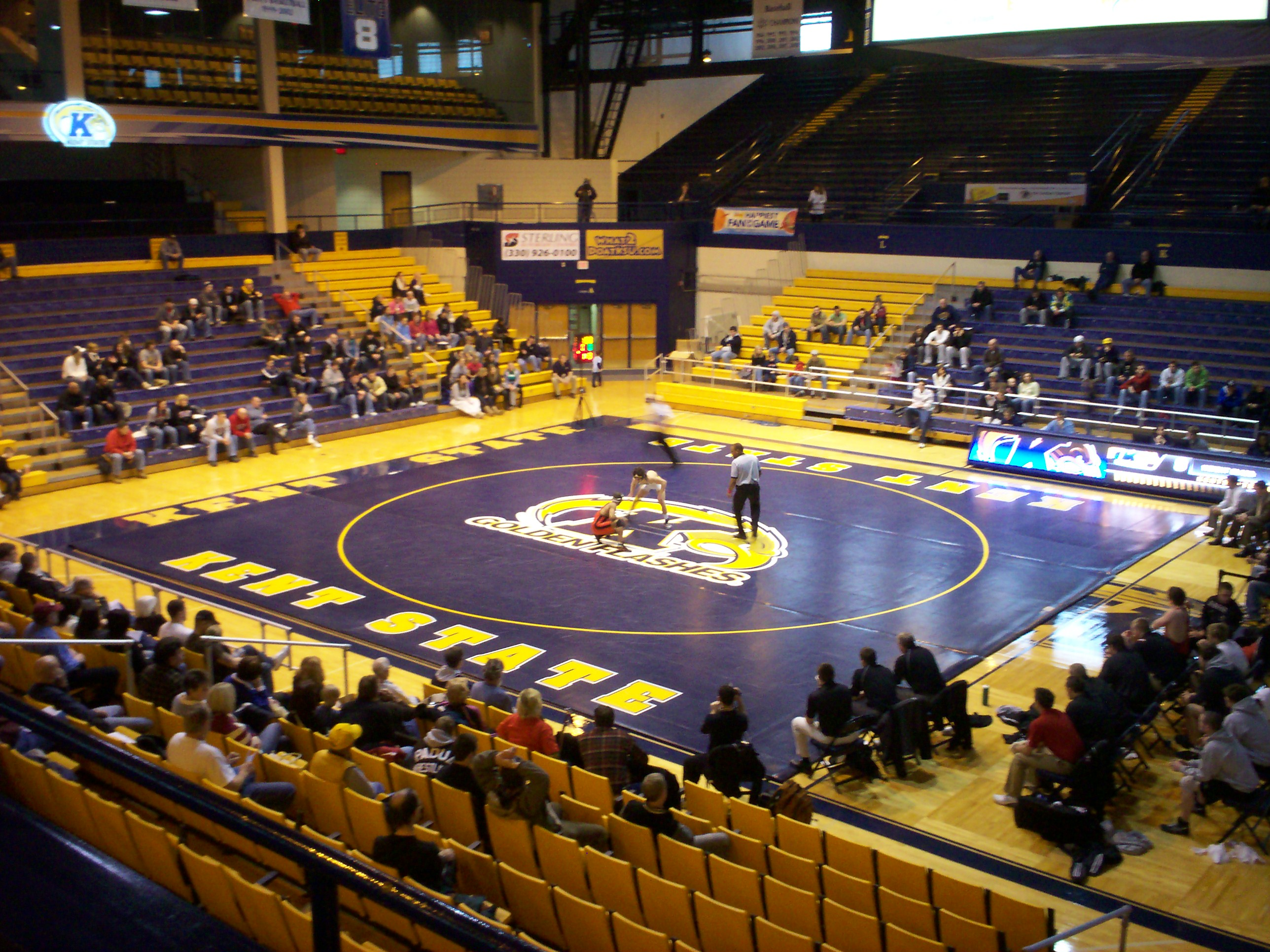
Kent State home wrestling meet on 24 January 2009 versus the Northern Illinois Huskies at the MAC Center.

The men's wrestling team is one of Kent State's oldest sports, going back to its establishment in 1927. It has historically been one of the school's most successful teams, winning multiple conference titles and making a series of appearances in the NCAA tournament, finishing as high as 5th nationally in both 1941 and 1942. For 42 seasons, the team was led by legendary coach Joseph Begala, who compiled a career record of 307-69-5 and the national reputation as the "winningest wrestling coach" coaching Kent State from 1929–1942 and again from 1945 until his retirement in 1971. The team has its home meets at the Memorial Athletic and Convocation Center, its home venue since 1950. More recently, the Flashes have again received national attention appearing in the national top-25 rankings in each of the past three seasons and began the 2008–2009 season ranked 23rd. The wrestling team is currently led by head coach and Kent State alum Jim Andrassy, who has been with the team as a wrestler, graduate assistant, and assistant coach since 1990 and as head coach since 2003. In 2011, Kent State had its first national champion with Dustin Kilgore at the 197-pound class.

- MAC regular-season titles: 1958, 1977, 1979, 1980, 1981, 1982, 1988, 1989, 1990, 2003, 2009
- MAC tournament titles: 1958, 1977, 1978, 1979, 1980, 1981, 1982, 1988, 1989, 1990
- NCAA tournament appearances: 1939, 1940, 1941, 1942, 1946, 1954, 1959, 1960, 1971, 1978, 1981, 1985

=== Former teams ===
Additionally, Kent State used to sponsor the following sports, which were eliminated over the years largely due to budget constraints:

- Ice hockey (now a club sport); 1980–1994
- Men's gymnastics; 1949–1951, 1970–1994
- Men's soccer; 1965–1981
- Men's swimming and diving; 1936–1988
- Women's swimming and diving; 1962–1988
- Men's tennis; 1931–1982
- Women's tennis; 1976–1982

== Facilities ==
Name	Opened	Renovated	Named for	Other names	Capacity	Sports	Image
Dix Stadium	1969	2007–08	Robert C. Dix, KSU trustee	Memorial Stadium (1969–1973); playing surface known as Zoeller Field for soccer games	25,319	Football, women's soccer, women's lacrosse, field hockey (1997–2005), men's soccer (1970s)	
Devine Diamond	1999	2023	Judith Devine, athletic administrator and first female head coach of the women's basketball team		500	Softball	
David and Peggy Edmonds Baseball and Softball Training Facility	2014		Dave and Peggy Edmunds, alumni and philanthropists			Baseball, softball	
Ferrara and Page Golf Training and Learning Center	2007		Herb Page, KSU director of golf; and Emilio and Margaret Ferrara, philanthropists			Men's golf, women's golf	
Field House	1990	2014				Indoor track and field, football (practice facility)	
Ice Arena	1970	2007			2,000	Men's ice hockey (1980–1994), men's ice hockey (club)	
Memorial Athletic and Convocation Center	1950	1992	Memorial for Kent State students and alumni who served in World War II	Men's Physical Education Building (1950–1956); Memorial Gymnasium (1956–1991)	6,327	Men's basketball, women's basketball, women's volleyball, women's gymnastics, wrestling	
Murphy–Mellis Field	2005		Mel Mellis and Susan Murphy, philanthropists		500	Field hockey	
Olga Mural Field at Schoonover Stadium	1966	2005	Hal and Julie Schoonover and Olga Mural, philanthropists	Gene Michael Field (1990–2005)	1,148	Baseball	
Outdoor Track						Outdoor track and field	

== Rivalries ==
The most prominent rival for Kent State is the Akron Zips of the University of Akron, located approximately 10 miles (16 km) to the southwest of Kent in Akron, Ohio. The earliest athletic meeting between the two schools is a men's basketball game on February 19, 1916, in Kent, followed by a baseball game later that year, also in Kent. The two schools first met in football in 1923. They were conference rivals as members of the Ohio Athletic Conference from 1932–1936 and again from 1944–1951. Kent State joined the Mid-American Conference in 1951 and Akron joined the MAC in 1992 after transitioning to the Division I Football Bowl Subdivision (FBS) in football. The Flashes compete with the Zips in baseball, men's and women's basketball, men's and women's indoor and outdoor track and field, women's cross country, women's golf, women's lacrosse, women's soccer, softball, and women's volleyball.

Since 1946, the two football teams have competed for the Wagon Wheel trophy. Through the 2022 meeting, Akron leads the overall series in football 35–28–2, but Kent State leads the series since the Wagon Wheel was contested, 27–24–1. The rivalry in men's basketball is an even closer series with Kent State leading the Zips 83–81 through the 2022–23 season. Since the late 1990s, both teams have been consistent contenders for the MAC overall and MAC Tournament titles, as well as the former MAC East division, so games between the two often have title implications for the regular season or in the tournament. Since Akron's first MAC East title in 1998, the two teams have combined for 11 MAC Tournament championships, 11 MAC regular-season championships, and 16 MAC East division titles.

In 2011, the two schools created the Wagon Wheel Challenge, which counts all athletic contests in the 14 sports where they compete head-to-head. Each sport is worth one point, awarded to the winning team. In sports with multiple meetings per season, whichever team wins the most games takes the full point. If the teams split the season's meetings, each school gets a half-point. For sports that only compete against each other as part of the conference championship meet, such as cross country, golf, and track and field, whichever team finishes higher in the championship meet is awarded the point. Games in the respective conference tournaments can also factor in to which school receives the point if the teams split their regular-season meetings, with the conference tournament meeting acting as a deciding game. Through the 2022–23 season, Kent State leads the challenge series 7–5 having won the first four seasons and the three most recent, with Akron taking five consecutive seasons in between including the shortened 2019–20 season.

Kent State also has a long-standing rivalry with the Bowling Green Falcons from Bowling Green State University in Bowling Green, Ohio. The two are sister schools, created together by the Lowry Bill in 1910, and both have been members of the Mid-American Conference since Bowling Green joined in 1952, the season after Kent State. While both schools have primary rivals in their immediate geographic regions, the two football teams play annually for the Anniversary Award and during the 2009–10 season both schools competed for the Centennial Cup to celebrate the respective centennial anniversaries of each school. Points were awarded for every head-to-head matchup in the 14 sports offered at both schools. Kent State won the cup 13.5–7.5.

Outside the Mid-American Conference, Kent State has established rivalries with the two other NCAA Division I programs in Northeast Ohio, the Cleveland State Vikings from Cleveland State University, and the Youngstown State Penguins from Youngstown State University, both members of the Horizon League. The Flashes and Vikings regularly meet in men's and women's basketball, wrestling, and softball, and previously had a long-standing series in baseball until the CSU baseball program was eliminated in 2011. Kent State and Youngstown State play regularly in men's and women's basketball, baseball, and softball, and have played periodically in football, where YSU competes in the Football Championship Subdivision (FCS). Through 2014, the teams have played 10 times with the last meeting being in 2003.

== Mascot ==
Flash, a golden eagle, is the mascot for the Golden Flashes. He was first created in 1985, and the current costume was designed in 1994. The first mascot was a Golden Retriever named Golden Flasher I, who held the position in 1955 but had to retire after a bone disease. A new retriever named Golden Flasher II was suggested but never became official. It was not until 1968 that Grog, a caveman from the comic B.C. found a place as Kent State's mascot. The mascot was short-lived, however, as it was retired in 1974. In 1971 through 1974, under head coach Don James, a western-themed horse and rider were present at all Dix Stadium games. The horse was an Arabian named Raffstar. Along with Grog, Raffstar and its rider were discontinued in 1974. In 1977, another Golden Retriever became the mascot, this time named Mac the Flash. The dog held the mascot job until 1979. In 1981 through 1983, the mascot went by many different names, including Freddie Flash, Golden Flash, Flashman, and Captain Flash. All of them were costumed people featuring lightning bolts.
