= List of Mountain West Conference champions =

This is a list of conference champions in sports sponsored by the Mountain West Conference, which sponsors eight men's and ten women's sports.

== Member schools ==
=== Current members ===
- Air Force (since 1999)
- Grand Canyon (since 2025; non-football member)
- Hawaii (since 2026)
- Nevada (since 2012)
- New Mexico (since 1999)
- San Jose State (since 2013)
- UC Davis (since 2026; non-football member)
- UNLV (since 1999)
- UTEP (since 2026)
- Wyoming (since 1999)

=== Affiliate members ===
- Colorado College (women's soccer) (since 2014)
- North Dakota State (football) (since 2026)
- Northern Illinois (football and women's gymnastics) (since 2026)
- Utah Tech (baseball and men's soccer) (since 2026)

=== Former members ===
- Boise State: 2011–2026
- BYU: 1999–2010
- Colorado State: 1999–2026
- Fresno State: 2012–2026
- San Diego State: 1999–2026
- TCU: 2005–2011
- Utah: 1999–2010
- Utah State: 2013–2026

Note: All years indicated are through the school year academic term, where it is assumed that a school year begins in fall 1999 and ends in spring 2023.

== Current champions ==
As of July 2, 2026

=== Men's sports ===
Sport	Regular Season Champion	Postseason champion
Baseball	Nevada	Fresno State
Basketball	New Mexico	Colorado State
Cross country	–	New Mexico
Football	–	Boise State
Golf	–	San Diego State
Indoor track & field	–	Colorado State
Outdoor track & field	–	Colorado State
Soccer	To be added in 2026–27	
Swimming & diving	To be added in 2026–27	
Tennis	Boise State	New Mexico

=== Women's sports ===
Sport	Regular Season Champion	Postseason champion
Basketball	UNLV	San Diego State
Cross country	–	New Mexico
Golf	–	UNLV
Gymnastics	Boise State	Utah State
Indoor track & field	–	New Mexico
Outdoor track & field	–	New Mexico
Soccer	Boise State	Utah State
Softball	Nevada	San Diego State
Swimming & diving	–	San Diego State
Tennis	San Diego State	Boise State
Volleyball	Utah State	Utah State

== Men's Basketball ==
=== Champions ===
Men's Basketball Summary
Current Members
School	Last MW Title	# of MW Regular Season Titles	# of MW Tournament Titles	Total # of MW Titles
New Mexico	2025	5	5	10
Nevada	2019	3	1	4
UNLV	2008	1	3	4
Wyoming	2015	2	1	3
Air Force	2004	1	0	1
San Jose State	–	0	0	0
Former Members
School	Last MW Title	# of MW Regular Season Titles	# of MW Tournament Titles	Total # of MW Titles
San Diego State	2023	9	7	16
Utah State	2026	3	3	6
Boise State	2022	2	1	3
Colorado State	2025	0	2	2
BYU	2011	6	1	7
Utah	2009	5	2	7
Fresno State	2016	0	1	1
TCU	–	0	0	0

	Champion(s)
2000	UNLV^{†} Utah
2001	BYU^{†} Utah; Wyoming
2002	San Diego State; Wyoming
2003	BYU; Colorado State; Utah
2004	Air Force; Utah
2005	New Mexico; Utah
2006	San Diego State^{†}
2007	BYU; UNLV
2008	BYU; UNLV
2009	BYU; New Mexico; Utah^{†}
2010	New Mexico; San Diego State
2011	BYU; San Diego State^{†}
2012	New Mexico^{†} San Diego State
2013	New Mexico^{†}
2014	New Mexico; San Diego State
2015	Boise State; San Diego State; Wyoming
2016	Fresno State; San Diego State
2017	Nevada^{†}
2018	Nevada; San Diego State
2019	Nevada; Utah State^{†}
2020	San Diego State; Utah State
2021	San Diego State^{†}
2022	Boise State^{†}
2023	San Diego State^{†}
2024	Utah State; New Mexico
2025	New Mexico; Colorado State
2026	Utah State

^{†} – A champion can claim two championships, where one is from the regular season and the other is from a postseason tournament.

== Women's Basketball ==
=== Champions ===
Women's Basketball Summary
Current Members
School	Last MW Title	# of MW Titles
UNLV	2025	8
New Mexico	2008	7
Wyoming	2021	1
Air Force	–	0
Nevada	–	0
San Jose State	–	0
Former Members
School	Last MW Title	# of MW Titles
Utah	2011	10
Colorado State	2026	8
Boise State	2020	7
San Diego State	2025	6
Fresno State	2020	3
BYU	2011	4
TCU	2010	1
Utah State	–	0

Year	Champion(s)
2000	Utah^{†}
2001	Colorado State; Utah
2002	BYU; Colorado State
2003	New Mexico; Utah
2004	New Mexico^{†} Utah
2005	New Mexico^{†} Utah
2006	BYU; Utah
2007	BYU; New Mexico
2008	New Mexico; Utah
2009	San Diego State; Utah^{†}
2010	San Diego State; TCU
2011	BYU; Utah
2012	San Diego State^{†}
2013	San Diego State; Fresno State
2014	Colorado State; Fresno State
2015	Colorado State; Boise State
2016	Colorado State^{†}
2017	Colorado State; Boise State
2018	Boise State^{†} UNLV
2019	Boise State^{†}
2020	Fresno State; Boise State
2021	New Mexico; Wyoming
2022	UNLV^{†}
2023	UNLV^{†}
2024	UNLV^{†}
2025	UNLV; San Diego State
2026	San Diego State Colorado State

^{†} – A champion can claim two championships, where one is from the regular season and the other is from a postseason tournament.

== Men's Cross Country ==
=== Champions ===
Men's Cross Country Summary
Current Members
School	Last MW Title	# of MW Titles
New Mexico	2025	9
Air Force	2022	5
Nevada	–	0
San Jose State	–	0
UNLV	–	0
Wyoming	–	0
San Diego State	–	0
Former Members
School	Last MW Title	# of MW Titles
BYU	2008	9
Colorado State	2018	2
Boise State	2016	1
Utah State	2019	1
Fresno State	–	0
TCU	–	0
Utah	–	0

Year	Champion(s)
1999	BYU
2000	BYU
2001	BYU
2002	BYU
2003	Air Force
2004	BYU
2005	BYU
2006	BYU
2007	BYU
2008	BYU
2009	New Mexico
2010	New Mexico
2011	New Mexico
2012	New Mexico
2013	New Mexico
2014	New Mexico
2015	Air Force
2016	Boise State
2017	Colorado State
2018	Colorado State
2019	Utah State
2020	Air Force
2021	Air Force
2022	Air Force
2023	New Mexico
2024	New Mexico
2025	New Mexico

== Women's Cross Country ==
=== Champions ===
Women's Cross Country Summary
Current Members
School	Last MW Title	# of MW Titles
New Mexico	2025	17
Air Force	–	0
Nevada	–	0
San Jose State	–	0
UNLV	–	0
Wyoming	–	0
Former Members
School	Last MW Title	# of MW Titles
BYU	2006	8
Colorado State	2023	2
Boise State	–	0
Fresno State	–	0
San Diego State	–	0
TCU	–	0
Utah	–	0
Utah State	–	0

Year	Champion(s)
1999	BYU
2000	BYU
2001	BYU
2002	BYU
2003	BYU
2004	BYU
2005	BYU
2006	BYU
2007	Colorado State
2008	New Mexico
2009	New Mexico
2010	New Mexico
2011	New Mexico
2012	New Mexico
2013	New Mexico
2014	New Mexico
2015	New Mexico
2016	New Mexico
2017	New Mexico
2018	New Mexico
2019	New Mexico
2020	New Mexico
2021	New Mexico
2022	New Mexico
2023	Colorado State
2024	New Mexico
2025	New Mexico

== Football ==
=== Affiliate members ===
- Hawaii (2012–2025; becoming full member in 2026)
- Northern Illinois (2026–present)

Note: All years indicated in this table reflect college football seasons, which are held during the opening fall term of the academic year.

=== Champions ===
Football Summary
Current Members
School	Last MW Title	# of MW Titles
San Jose State	2020	1
Air Force	–	0
Hawaii	–	0
Nevada	–	0
New Mexico	–	0
UNLV	–	0
Wyoming	–	0
Former Members
School	Last MW Title	# of MW Titles
Boise State	2025	7
Fresno State	2022	4
BYU	2007	4
TCU	2011	4
Utah	2008	4
Colorado State	2002	3
San Diego State	2016	3
Utah State	2021	1

Year	Champion(s)
1999	BYU; Colorado State; Utah
2000	Colorado State
2001	BYU
2002	Colorado State
2003	Utah
2004	Utah
2005	TCU
2006	BYU
2007	BYU
2008	Utah
2009	TCU
2010	TCU
2011	TCU
2012	Boise State; Fresno State; San Diego State
2013	Fresno State
2014	Boise State
2015	San Diego State
2016	San Diego State
2017	Boise State
2018	Fresno State
2019	Boise State
2020	San Jose State
2021	Utah State
2022	Fresno State
2023	Boise State
2024	Boise State
2025	Boise State

== Men's Golf ==
=== Champions ===
Men's Golf Summary
Current Members
School	Last MW Title	# of MW Titles
New Mexico	2021	8
UNLV	2026	6
Air Force	–	0
Nevada	–	0
San Jose State	–	0
Wyoming	–	0
Utah State	–	0
Former Members
School	Last MW Title	# of MW Titles
San Diego State	2025	7
BYU	2007	2
Colorado State	2010	2
TCU	2009	1
Boise State	–	0
Fresno State	–	0
Utah	–	0

Year	Champion(s)
2000	UNLV
2001	BYU
2002	UNLV
2003	New Mexico
2004	New Mexico
2005	New Mexico
2006	New Mexico
2007	BYU
2008	Colorado State
2009	TCU
2010	Colorado State
2011	San Diego State
2012	San Diego State
2013	New Mexico
2014	New Mexico
2015	San Diego State
2016	UNLV
2017	UNLV
2018	UNLV
2019	New Mexico
2020	–
2021	New Mexico
2022	San Diego State
2023	San Diego State
2024	San Diego State
2025	San Diego State
2026	UNLV

== Women's Golf ==
=== Champions ===
Women's Golf Summary
Current Members
School	Last MW Title	# of MW Titles
New Mexico	2023	10
UNLV	2026	9
San Jose State	2024	2
Air Force	–	0
Nevada	–	0
Wyoming	–	0
Former Members
School	Last MW Title	# of MW Titles
TCU	2012	3
San Diego State	2019	2
Boise State	–	0
BYU	–	0
Colorado State	–	0
Fresno State	–	0
Utah	–	0
Utah State	–	0

Year	Champion(s)
2000	New Mexico
2001	New Mexico
2002	New Mexico
2003	New Mexico
2004	UNLV
2005	UNLV
2006	UNLV
2007	TCU
2008	New Mexico
2009	New Mexico
2010	New Mexico
2011	TCU
2012	TCU
2013	UNLV
2014	New Mexico
2015	San Diego State
2016	UNLV
2017	UNLV
2018	UNLV
2019	San Diego State
2020	–
2021	New Mexico
2022	San Jose State
2023	New Mexico
2024	San Jose State
2025	UNLV
2026	UNLV

== Men's Indoor Track & Field ==
=== Champions ===
Men's Indoor Track & Field Summary
Current Members
School	Last MW Title	# of MW Titles
Air Force	2023	5
New Mexico	2015	3
Nevada	–	0
San Jose State	–	0
UNLV	–	0
Wyoming	–	0
Former Members
School	Last MW Title	# of MW Titles
BYU	2011	11
Colorado State	2026	7
Boise State	–	0
Fresno State	–	0
San Diego State	–	0
TCU	–	0
Utah	–	0
Utah State	–	0

Year	Champion(s)
2000	BYU
2001	BYU
2002	Colorado State
2003	BYU
2004	BYU
2005	BYU
2006	BYU
2007	BYU
2008	BYU
2009	BYU
2010	BYU
2011	BYU
2012	Air Force
2013	New Mexico
2014	New Mexico
2015	New Mexico
2016	Air Force
2017	Colorado State
2018	Air Force
2019	Colorado State
2020	Colorado State
2021	–
2022	Air Force
2023	Air Force
2024	Colorado State
2025	Colorado State
2026	Colorado State

== Women's Indoor Track & Field ==
=== Champions ===
Women's Indoor Track & Field Summary
Current Members
School	Last MW Title	# of MW Titles
New Mexico	2026	4
UNLV	2020	2
Air Force	–	0
Nevada	–	0
San Jose State	–	0
Wyoming	–	0
Former Members
School	Last MW Title	# of MW Titles
BYU	2011	10
Colorado State	2024	7
TCU	2012	2
San Diego State	2013	1
Boise State	–	0
Fresno State	–	0
Utah	–	0
Utah State	–	0

Year	Champion(s)
2000	BYU
2001	BYU
2002	BYU
2003	BYU
2004	BYU
2005	BYU
2006	Colorado State
2007	BYU
2008	TCU
2009	BYU
2010	BYU
2011	BYU
2012	TCU
2013	San Diego State
2014	New Mexico
2015	New Mexico
2016	Colorado State
2017	Colorado State
2018	UNLV
2019	Colorado State
2020	UNLV
2021	–
2022	Colorado State
2023	Colorado State
2024	Colorado State
2025	New Mexico
2026	New Mexico

== Men's soccer ==
The MW will add men's soccer in the 2026 season.

=== Affiliate members ===
- Utah Tech (2026–present)

== Women's soccer ==
=== Affiliate members ===
- Colorado College (since 2014)

Note: All years indicated in this table reflect college soccer seasons, which are held during the opening fall term of the academic year.

=== Champions ===
Soccer Summary
Current Members
School	Last MW Title	# of MW Titles
New Mexico	2022	8
UNLV	2016	6
San Jose State	2022	5
Wyoming	2022	2
Air Force	–	0
Colorado College	–	0
Grand Canyon	–	0
Nevada	–	0
Former Members
School	Last MW Title	# of MW Titles
BYU	2010	13
San Diego State	2019	11
Utah	2006	6
Boise State	2025	4
Utah State	2025	2
Colorado State	–	0
Fresno State	–	0
TCU	–	0

Year	Regular-Season Champion(s)	Tournament Champion
1999	BYU San Diego State; Utah	BYU
2000	BYU	BYU
2001	BYU	BYU
2002	BYU	BYU
2003	Utah	Utah
2004	UNLV	Utah
2005	Utah	UNLV
2006	Utah	UNLV
2007	UNLV	BYU
2008	BYU	BYU
2009	BYU	San Diego State
2010	New Mexico	BYU
2011	New Mexico	New Mexico
2012	San Diego State	San Diego State
2013	San Diego State	San Diego State
2014	San Diego State	San Diego State
2015	San Diego State	San Jose State
2016	UNLV	UNLV
2017	San Jose State	San Diego State
2018	Boise State; New Mexico; Wyoming	San Jose State
2019	Boise State; San Diego State	Boise State
2020	New Mexico	–
2021	New Mexico	New Mexico
2022	New Mexico; San Jose State; Wyoming	San Jose State
2023	San Diego State	Utah State
2024	Boise State	Utah State
2025	Boise State	Utah State

== Softball ==
=== Champions ===
Softball Summary
Current Members
School	Last MW Title	# of MW Titles
San Jose State	2017	1
Air Force	–	0
Nevada	–	0
New Mexico	–	0
UNLV	–	0
Wyoming	–	0
Former Members
School	Last MW Title	# of MW Titles
San Diego State	2026	13
BYU	2011	7
Utah	2006	5
Fresno State	2021	4
Colorado State	2019	3
Boise State	2018	1
TCU	–	0
Utah State	–	0

Year	Champion(s)
2000	Utah^{†}
2001	BYU; San Diego State
2002	San Diego State; Utah
2003	Colorado State; San Diego State
2004	Colorado State; Utah
2005	BYU^{†}
2006	San Diego State; Utah
2007	BYU
2008	San Diego State
2009	BYU
2010	BYU
2011	BYU
2012	San Diego State
2013	San Diego State
2014	San Diego State
2015	Fresno State
2016	Fresno State
2017	San Jose State
2018	Boise State
2019	Colorado State
2020	Fresno State
2021	Fresno State
2022	San Diego State
2023	San Diego State
2024	San Diego State
2025	San Diego State
2026	San Diego State

^{†} – From the formation of the MW in 1999 (2000 softball season) through 2006, a champion could claim two championships, with one from the regular season and the other from a postseason tournament. The MW abolished its softball tournament after the 2006 season (2005–06 school year).

== Men's swimming & diving ==
The MW will add men's swimming & diving in 2026–27.

== Women's swimming & diving ==
=== Champions ===
Swimming and Diving Summary
Current Members
School	Last MW Title	# of MW Titles
UNLV	2021	3
Nevada	2016	2
Air Force	–	0
New Mexico	–	0
San Jose State	–	0
Wyoming	–	0
Former Members
School	Last MW Title	# of MW Titles
BYU	2010	12
San Diego State	2026	10
Utah	2007	5
Boise State	2018	4
Colorado State	2004	1
Fresno State	–	0
TCU	–	0
Utah State	–	0

Year	Champion(s)
2000	BYU
2001	BYU
2002	BYU
2003	BYU; UNLV
2004	BYU; Colorado State; Utah
2005	UNLV; Utah
2006	Utah^{†}
2007	BYU; Utah
2008	BYU^{†}
2009	BYU^{†}
2010	BYU^{†}
2011	San Diego State^{†}
2012	Boise State
2013	San Diego State
2014	Boise State
2015	Nevada
2016	Nevada
2017	Boise State
2018	Boise State
2019	San Diego State
2020	San Diego State
2021	UNLV
2022	San Diego State
2023	San Diego State
2024	San Diego State
2025	San Diego State
2026	San Diego State

^{†} – A champion can claim two championships, where one is from the regular season and the other is from a postseason tournament. The champion is determined by regular season play prior to the 2002–03 and 2010–11 thereafter.

== Volleyball ==
Note: All years indicated in this table reflect college women's volleyball seasons, which are held during the opening fall term of the academic year. (This contrasts with men's volleyball, a sport not sponsored by the MW, whose season is in the spring term.)

=== Champions ===
Volleyball Summary
Current Members
School	Last MW Title	# of MW Titles
UNLV	2022	3
Air Force	–	0
Nevada	–	0
New Mexico	–	0
San Jose State	–	0
Wyoming	–	0
Former Members
School	Last MW Title	# of MW Titles
Colorado State	2024	24
Utah	2008	6
Utah State	2025	5
BYU	2005	3
Boise State	2021	2
San Diego State	2012	1
Fresno State	2023	1
TCU	–	0

Year	Champion(s)
1999	BYU; Colorado State
2000	BYU; Colorado State
2001	Colorado State; Utah
2002	Colorado State; Utah
2003	Colorado State^{†}
2004	Colorado State^{†} Utah
2005	BYU; Utah
2006	Colorado State; Utah
2007	Colorado State; UNLV
2008	Utah
2009	Colorado State
2010	Colorado State
2011	Colorado State^{†}
2012	Colorado State; San Diego State
2013	Colorado State
2014	Colorado State
2015	Colorado State
2016	Boise State
2017	Colorado State
2018	Colorado State
2019	Colorado State
2020	UNLV
2021	Boise State; Colorado State Utah State
2022	UNLV Utah State
2023	Utah State Fresno State
2024	Colorado State^{†}
2025	Utah State^{†}

^{†} – A school could claim two championships, one from the regular season and the other from a postseason tournament, in three different time periods—first from the formation of the MW in 1999 through the 2007 season (2007–08 school year), then in the 2011 season, and most recently since the 2025 season. The MW abolished its women's volleyball tournament after its 2007 edition, and from that time held it in only one season (2011) until reinstating the tournament in 2025.

== Conference championships ==
=== Men's championship winners ===
	Football	Men's basketball	Baseball	Cross country	Golf	Swimming & Diving	Tennis	Track & Field (Outdoors)	Track & Field (Indoors)
1999–2000	BYU; CSU; Utah	Regular Season; UNLV/Utah; Tournament; UNLV	Regular Season; New Mexico; Tournament; SDSU	BYU	UNLV	BYU	Tournament; New Mexico	BYU	BYU
2000–2001	CSU	Regular Season; BYU/Utah/Wyoming; Tournament; BYU	Regular Season and Tournament; BYU	BYU	BYU	BYU	Regular Season and Tournament; BYU	BYU	BYU
2001–2002	BYU	Regular Season; Wyoming; Tournament; SDSU	Regular Season; SDSU; Tournament; BYU	BYU	UNLV	BYU	Regular Season; BYU/SDSU Tournament; SDSU	BYU	CSU
2002–2003	CSU	Regular Season; BYU/Utah; Tournament; CSU	Regular Season and Tournament; UNLV	Air Force	New Mexico	BYU	Regular Season; BYU/New Mexico/SDSU; Tournament; SDSU	BYU	BYU
2003–2004	Utah	Regular Season; Air Force; Tournament; Utah	Regular Season; SDSU; Tournament; UNLV	BYU	New Mexico	BYU	Regular Season and Tournament; New Mexico	BYU	BYU
2004–2005	Utah	Regular Season; Utah; Tournament; New Mexico	Regular Season and Tournament; UNLV	BYU	New Mexico	UNLV	Regular Season and Tournament; SDSU	BYU	BYU
2005–2006	TCU	Regular Season and Tournament; SDSU	Regular Season and Tournament; TCU	BYU	New Mexico	UNLV	Regular Season; SDSU; Tournament; TCU	BYU	BYU
2006–2007	BYU	Regular Season; BYU; Tournament; UNLV	Regular Season and Tournament; TCU	BYU	BYU	UNLV; BYU	Regular Season; SDSU; Tournament; UNLV	BYU	BYU
2007–2008	BYU	Regular Season; BYU; Tournament; UNLV	Regular Season and Tournament; TCU	BYU	CSU	Regular Season; BYU; Tournament; UNLV	Regular Season; New Mexico/TCU/Utah; Tournament; TCU	BYU	BYU
2008–2009	Utah	Regular Season; BYU/Utah/New Mexico; Tournament; Utah	Regular Season; TCU; Tournament; Utah	New Mexico	TCU	Regular Season and Tournament; UNLV	Regular Season; TCU; Tournament; New Mexico	BYU	BYU
2009–2010	TCU	Regular Season; New Mexico; Tournament; SDSU	Regular Season and Tournament; TCU	New Mexico	CSU	Regular Season; TCU; Tournament; UNLV	Regular Season; BYU; Tournament; TCU	BYU	BYU
2010–2011	TCU	Regular Season; BYU/SDSU; Tournament; SDSU	Regular Season; TCU Tournament; New Mexico	New Mexico	SDSU	Regular Season and Tournament; UNLV	Regular Season and Tournament; BYU	BYU	BYU
2011–2012	TCU	Regular Season; New Mexico/SDSU; Tournament; New Mexico	Regular Season; New Mexico/TCU Tournament; New Mexico	New Mexico	SDSU	No Longer; Sponsored	Regular Season and Tournament; Boise State	Air Force	Air Force
2012–2013	Boise State; Fresno State; SDSU	Regular Season and Tournament; New Mexico	Regular Season; New Mexico; Tournament; SDSU	New Mexico	New Mexico	No Longer; Sponsored	Regular Season; SDSU; Tournament; Boise State	Air Force	New Mexico
2013–2014	Fresno State	Regular Season; SDSU; Tournament; New Mexico	Regular Season; UNLV/New Mexico; Tournament; SDSU	New Mexico	New Mexico	No Longer; Sponsored	Boise State	New Mexico	New Mexico
2014–2015	Boise State	Regular Season; Boise State/SDSU; Tournament; Wyoming	Regular Season; Nevada; Tournament; SDSU	Air Force	SDSU	No Longer; Sponsored	Boise State	CSU	New Mexico
2015–2016	SDSU	Regular Season; SDSU; Tournament; Fresno State	Regular Season; Fresno State; Tournament; New Mexico	Boise State	UNLV	No Longer; Sponsored	Regular Season; Utah State; Tournament; UNLV	Air Force	Air Force
2016–2017	SDSU	Regular Season and Tournament; Nevada	Regular Season; New Mexico; Tournament; SDSU	Colorado State	UNLV	No Longer; Sponsored	Regular Season and Tournament; Utah State	Air Force	CSU
2017–2018	Boise State	Regular Season Nevada Tournament SDSU	Regular Season; Nevada; Tournament; SDSU	Boise State	UNLV	No Longer; Sponsored	Regular Season and Tournament; Utah State	Air Force	Air Force
2018–2019	Fresno State	Regular Season Nevada/Utah State Tournament Utah State	Regular Season and Tournament Fresno State	Utah State	New Mexico	No Longer; Sponsored	Regular Season; New Mexico; Tournament; Fresno State	CSU	CSU
2019–2020	Boise State	Regular Season SDSU Tournament Utah State	–	Air Force	–	No Longer; Sponsored	–	–	CSU
2020–2021	San Jose State	Regular Season and Tournament SDSU	Regular Season; Nevada; Tournament –	Air Force	New Mexico	No Longer; Sponsored	Regular Season; New Mexico; Tournament –	CSU	–
2021–2022	Utah State	Regular Season and Tournament Boise State	Regular Season; UNLV; Tournament; SDSU	Air Force	SDSU	No Longer; Sponsored	Regular Season and Tournament; Nevada	Air Force	Air Force
2022–2023	Fresno State	Regular Season and Tournament SDSU	Regular Season SDSU/SJSU Tournament SJSU	New Mexico	SDSU	No Longer; Sponsored	Regular Season New Mexico Tournament Boise State	Air Force	Air Force
2023–2024	Boise State	Regular Season; Utah State; Tournament; New Mexico	Regular Season; Air Force; Tournament; Fresno State	New Mexico	SDSU	No Longer; Sponsored	Regular Season; Boise State/Utah State; Tournament; Boise State	Air Force	Colorado State
2024–2025	Boise State	Regular Season; New Mexico; Tournament; Colorado State	Regular Season; Nevada; Tournament; Fresno State	New Mexico	SDSU	No Longer; Sponsored	Regular Season; Boise State; Tournament; New Mexico	Colorado State	Colorado State
2025–2026	Boise State	Regular Season; Ongoing; Tournament; March 14	Regular Season; Upcoming; Tournament; May 23	New Mexico	May 5	No Longer; Sponsored	Regular Season; Upcoming; Tournament; April 24	May 16	February 28

Notes

- The regular-season championships in men's and women's tennis were discontinued after the 2012–13 school year, but returned in 2015–16.

=== Women's championship winners ===
	Women's basketball	Softball	Soccer	Volleyball	Cross country	Golf	Swimming & Diving	Tennis	Track & Field (Outdoors)	Indoor Track
1999–2000	Regular Season and Tournament; Utah	Regular Season and Tournament; Utah	Regular Season; SDSU; Tournament; BYU	Regular Season; BYU; Tournament; CSU	BYU	New Mexico	BYU	Regular Season; SDSU; Tournament; UNLV	BYU	BYU
2000–2001	Regular Season; Utah; Tournament; CSU	Regular Season and Tournament; BYU	Regular Season and Tournament; BYU	Regular Season; CSU; Tournament; BYU	BYU	New Mexico	BYU	Regular Season and Tournament; BYU	BYU	BYU
2001–2002	Regular Season; CSU; Tournament; BYU	Regular Season; SDSU; Tournament; Utah	Regular Season and Tournament; BYU	Regular Season; CSU; Tournament; Utah	BYU	New Mexico	BYU	Regular Season; SDSU; Tournament; UNLV	BYU	BYU
2002–2003	Regular Season; Utah; Tournament; New Mexico	Regular Season; SDSU; Tournament; CSU	Regular Season and Tournament; BYU	Regular Season; CSU; Tournament; Utah	BYU	New Mexico	BYU	Regular Season; UNLV; Tournament; SDSU	BYU	BYU
2003–2004	Regular Season; Utah; Tournament; New Mexico	Regular Season; CSU; Tournament; Utah	Regular Season; Utah; Tournament; BYU	Regular Season and Tournament; CSU	BYU	UNLV	BYU	Regular Season; New Mexico; Tournament; BYU	BYU	BYU
2004–2005	Regular Season and Tournament; New Mexico	Regular Season and Tournament; BYU	Regular Season; UNLV; Tournament; Utah	Regular Season and Tournament; CSU	BYU	UNLV	UNLV	Regular Season and Tournament; BYU	BYU	BYU
2005–2006	Regular Season; BYU; Tournament; Utah	Regular Season; SDSU; Tournament; Utah	Regular Season; Utah; Tournament; UNLV	Regular Season; BYU; Tournament; Utah	BYU	UNLV	Utah	Regular Season and Tournament; TCU	BYU	CSU
2006–2007	Regular Season; BYU; Tournament; New Mexico	BYU	Regular Season; Utah; Tournament; UNLV	Regular Season; Utah; Tournament; CSU	BYU	TCU	Regular Season; Utah; Tournament; BYU	Regular Season; BYU/TCU; Tournament; BYU	BYU	BYU
2007–2008	Regular Season; Utah; Tournament; New Mexico	SDSU	Regular Season; UNLV; Tournament; BYU	Regular Season; CSU; Tournament; UNLV	CSU	New Mexico	Regular Season and Tournament; BYU	Regular Season; TCU; Tournament; UNLV	CSU	TCU
2008–2009	Regular Season; Utah/SDSU; Tournament; Utah	BYU	Regular Season and Tournament; BYU	Utah	New Mexico	New Mexico	Regular Season and Tournament; BYU	Regular Season; UNLV; Tournament; TCU	BYU	BYU
2009–2010	Regular Season; TCU; Tournament; SDSU	BYU	Regular Season; BYU Tournament; SDSU	CSU	New Mexico	New Mexico	Regular Season and Tournament; BYU	Regular Season; Utah; Tournament; TCU	BYU	BYU
2010–2011	Regular Season; BYU; Tournament; Utah	BYU	Regular Season; New Mexico Tournament; BYU	CSU	New Mexico	TCU	Regular Season and Tournament; SDSU	Regular Season; UNLV; Tournament; Utah	BYU	BYU
2011–2012	Regular Season and Tournament; SDSU	SDSU	Regular Season and Tournament; New Mexico	Regular Season and Tournament; CSU	New Mexico	TCU	Boise State	Regular Season and Tournament; TCU	TCU	TCU
2012–2013	Regular Season; SDSU; Tournament; Fresno State	SDSU	Regular Season and Tournament; SDSU	CSU; SDSU	New Mexico	UNLV	SDSU	Regular Season; SDSU; Tournament; UNLV	SDSU	SDSU
2013–2014	Regular Season; CSU; Tournament; Fresno State	SDSU	Regular Season and Tournament; SDSU	CSU	New Mexico	New Mexico	Boise State	Fresno State	SDSU	New Mexico
2014–2015	Regular Season; CSU; Tournament; Boise State	Fresno State	Regular Season and Tournament; SDSU	CSU	New Mexico	SDSU	SDSU	New Mexico	SDSU	New Mexico
2015–2016	Regular Season and Tournament; CSU	Fresno State	Regular Season; SDSU Tournament; SJSU	CSU	New Mexico	UNLV	Nevada	Regular Season; Fresno State; Tournament; UNLV	CSU	CSU
2016–2017	Regular Season; CSU; Tournament; Boise State	SJSU	Regular Season and Tournament; UNLV	Boise State	New Mexico	UNLV	Boise State	Regular Season; UNLV; Tournament; SJSU	SDSU	CSU
2017–2018	Regular Season; Boise State/UNLV; Tournament; Boise State	Boise State	Regular Season SJSU Tournament; SDSU	CSU	New Mexico	UNLV	Boise State	Fresno State	SDSU	UNLV
2018–2019	Regular Season and Tournament Boise State	CSU	Regular Season Boise State/New Mexico/Wyoming Tournament SJSU	CSU	New Mexico	SDSU	SDSU	UNLV	CSU	CSU
2019–2020	Regular Season Fresno State Tournament Boise State	Not held	Regular Season Boise State/SDSU Tournament Boise State	CSU	New Mexico	Not held	SDSU	Not held	CSU	UNLV
2020–2021	Regular Season New Mexico Tournament Wyoming	Fresno State	Regular Season New Mexico Tournament Not held	UNLV	New Mexico	New Mexico	UNLV	SJSU	Not held	Not held
2021–2022	Regular Season and Tournament UNLV	SDSU	Regular Season and Tournament New Mexico	Regular Season CSU/Utah State Tournament Boise State	New Mexico	SJSU	SDSU	Regular Season Fresno State Tournament SDSU	SDSU	CSU
2022–2023	Regular Season and Tournament UNLV	Regular Season Boise State Tournament SDSU	Regular Season Wyoming/New Mexico/SJSU Tournament SJSU	Regular Season UNLV Tournament Utah State	New Mexico	New Mexico	SDSU	Regular Season Wyoming Tournament UNLV	SDSU	CSU
2023–2024	Regular Season and Tournament; UNLV	Regular Season and Tournament; SDSU	Regular Season; SDSU; Tournament; Utah State	Regular Season; Utah State; Tournament; Fresno State	CSU	SJSU	SDSU	Regular Season; New Mexico; Tournament; SDSU	CSU	CSU
2024–2025	Regular Season; UNLV; Tournament; SDSU	Regular Season; Nevada; Tournament; SDSU	Regular Season; Boise State; Tournament; Utah State	Regular Season and Tournament; CSU	New Mexico	UNLV	SDSU	Regular Season; SDSU; Tournament; Boise State	New Mexico	New Mexico
2025–2026	Regular Season; Ongoing; Tournament; March 10	Regular Season; Upcoming; Tournament; May 9	Regular Season; Boise State; Tournament; Utah State	Regular Season and Tournament; Utah State	New Mexico	April 23	February 21	Regular Season; Upcoming; Tournament; April 25	May 16	February 28

Notes

- The softball tournament was discontinued after the 2006 season before returning in the 2023 season.
- The regular-season championships in men's and women's tennis were discontinued after the 2012–13 school year, but returned in 2015–16.

== See also ==
- List of Mountain West Conference football standings
