= San Diego State Aztecs =

Intercollegiate sports teams of San Diego State University

Coordinates: 32.77544°N 117.072823°W

- University: San Diego State University
- Nickname: Aztecs
- NCAA: Division I (FBS)
- Conference: Pac-12 (primary); GCC (women's water polo); Big 12 (women's lacrosse)
- Athletic director: John David Wicker
- Location: San Diego, California
- Varsity teams: 17 (6 men's, 11 women's)
- Football stadium: Snapdragon Stadium
- Basketball arena: Viejas Arena
- Baseball stadium: Tony Gwynn Stadium
- Softball stadium: SDSU Softball Stadium
- Soccer stadium: SDSU Sports Deck
- Aquatics center: Aztec Aquaplex
- Lacrosse field: Aztec Lacrosse Field
- Tennis venue: Aztec Tennis Center
- Outdoor track and field venue: SDSU Sports Deck (aka "Aztrack")
- Volleyball arena: Peterson Gymnasium
- Colors: Scarlet and black
- Mascot: Spirit Leader
- Fight song: SDSU Fight Song
- Website: goaztecs.com

The San Diego State Aztecs are the intercollegiate athletic teams that represent San Diego State University (SDSU). The university fields 17 varsity teams (6 men's, 11 women's) in National Collegiate Athletic Association (NCAA) Division I, primarily as a member of the Pac-12 Conference. The Aztecs football team competes in the Football Bowl Subdivision (FBS), the highest level of NCAA football competition.

The women's water polo team participates in the Golden Coast Conference and the women's lacrosse team participates in the Big 12 Conference. The ice hockey team competes in the American Collegiate Hockey Association with other western region club teams.

SDSU's athletic teams are called the "Aztecs". The Aztecs nickname was chosen by students in 1925. The mascot is the Aztec Warrior, formerly referred to as "Monty Montezuma". Team colors are scarlet (red) and black. As of 2021, athletes from the university had won 14 medals at the Olympic Games.

== History ==
San Diego State Aztecs historical logos.

The first major sport on campus was rowing, but it initially had no coaches or tournaments. Other sports that developed early in the campus's history were tennis, basketball, golf, croquet, and baseball. Early on, the school's football program had such a limited selection of players that faculty had to be used to fill the roster. When the college merged with the junior college in 1921, the college became a member of the Junior College Conference. After the school won most of the conference titles in a variety of sports, the league requested that college leave out of fairness to the smaller schools. For its football program, the team outscored its opponents 249 to 52 in ten games, resulting in the first sales of season tickets in 1923. From 1925 to 1926, the college played as an independent. It then joined the Southern California Conference in 1926, where it did not win a football conference championship until 1936. However, in other sports including tennis and basketball, it excelled. The college remained with the conference until 1939, when it joined the California Collegiate Athletic Association.

The basketball team reached and won multiple championship games during the 1930–1940s, including a conference title in 1931, 1934, 1937, and 1939. It reached the national championship in 1939 and 1940, losing in the final rounds. However, in 1941 the college returned and won the college's first national title. In track, the team won conference titles in 1935, 1936, 1937, 1938, and 1939. The football team won conference titles in 1936 and 1937, and the baseball team won three conference titles and placed second three times between 1935 and 1941.

In 1955, the Aztec Club was established and raised $20,000 a year by 1957. The club worked in increasing athletic scholarships, hiring better coaches, and developing the college's intercollegiate athletic programs. In 1956, students approved through a vote of allowing a mandatory student activity fee, with a portion going to athletics. By the end of the decade the budget had doubled to $40,000. The campus's most successful sports program during the 1950s was cross-country, when the team won eight straight conference titles and AAU regional titles and placed high in national competitions. Basketball teams ranged from last in the conference to multiple conference, regional, and national appearances. The football program had its first undefeated team in 1951, but in the last part of the decade earned the worst records in the school's football program under the direction of head coach Paul Governali.

Under Governali, the campus's football program suffered due to Governali's policy of not recruiting players. To improve the program, Love hired in 1961 Don Coryell, who led the program win three consecutive championships (1966–68), and 104 wins, 19 losses, and 2 ties by the time he left SDSU. Coryell was assisted by John Madden, Joe Gibbs, and Rod Dowhower, among others. In Coryell's first year, attendance at home games averaged 8,000 people, but by 1966 it had doubled to 16,000. This later jumped to 26,000–41,000 per game with the addition of the new San Diego Stadium. At some games, attendance was larger than at San Diego Chargers games. There were several undefeated seasons and many players broke records for most catches, touchdowns, and passing yards. In 1969, San Diego State College moved into NCAA Division I, leaving the California Collegiate Athletic Association. In 1972, Coyrell left to pursue coaching in the NFL.

Basketball also did well, with the 1967–68 team being ranked the number one college-level team in the nation, although it did not win a national title. The Aztecs also won the 1960 CCAA baseball title and multiple national championships throughout the 1960s in track, cross country, and swimming.

By 1970–71, the campus had 14 NCAA sports. The 1973 men's volleyball team won the NCAA national championship which was the first NCAA national title since moving to Division I status.

SDSU competes in NCAA Division I (FBS). Its primary conference is the Pac-12 Conference; its women's rowing team competes in the American Athletic Conference, its women's lacrosse team comptes in the Big 12 Conference, and its women's water polo team participates in the Golden Coast Conference. The ice hockey team competes in the ACHA with other western region club teams (www.sdsuhockey.com). The university colors are scarlet (red) and black, SDSU's athletic teams are called the "Aztecs", and its mascot is the Aztec Warrior, formerly referred to as "Monty Montezuma".

== Sports sponsored ==
| Men's sports | Women's sports |
|---|---|
| Baseball | Basketball |
| Football | Cross country |
| Basketball | Golf |
| Golf | Lacrosse |
| Soccer | Soccer |
| Tennis | Softball |
| | Swimming & diving |
| | Tennis |
| | Track & field^{†} |
| | Volleyball |
| | Water Polo |
† – Track and field includes both indoor and outdoor.

=== Men's varsity sports ===
==== Baseball ====
- Head Coach: Shaun Cole
- Stadium: Tony Gwynn Stadium
- Conference regular season championships: 5 (1986 • 1988 • 1990 • 2002 • 2004)
- Conference tournament championships: 8 (1990 • 1991 • 2000 • 2013 • 2014 • 2015 • 2017 • 2018)
- NCAA Division I Baseball Championship appearances: 14 (1979 • 1981 • 1982 • 1983 • 1984 • 1986 • 1990 • 1991 • 2009 • 2013 • 2014 • 2015 • 2017 • 2018)

San Diego State is a member of the Mountain West Conference

| Year | Tournament Record | Notes |
|---|---|---|
| 1979 | 2-2 | Lost in the Mideast Regional finals to Pepperdine. |
| 1981 | 0–2 | Eliminated by Oral Roberts in the Midwest Regional. |
| 1982 | 0–2 | Eliminated by Houston in the West II Regional. |
| 1983 | 1–2 | Eliminated by UC Santa Barbara in the West I Regional semifinals. |
| 1984 | 3–2 | Lost in the West I Regional finals to Cal State Fullerton. |
| 1986 | 0–2 | Eliminated by Texas-Pan American in the Central Regional. |
| 1990 | 3–2 | Lost in the West I Regional finals to Stanford. |
| 1991 | 0–2 | Eliminated by Portland in the West II Regional. |
| 2009 | 1–2 | Eliminated by UC Irvine in the Irvine Regional. |
| 2013 | 0–2 | Eliminated by San Diego in the Los Angeles Regional. |
| 2014 | 0–2 | Eliminated by Louisiana in the Lafayette Regional. |
| 2015 | 1–2 | Eliminated by USC in the Charlottesville Regional. |
| 2017 | 1–2 | Eliminated by Long Beach State in the Long Beach Regional. |
| 2018 | 0–2 | Eliminated by Northwestern State in the Corvallis Regional. |

See: San Diego State baseball and College baseball

==== Football ====
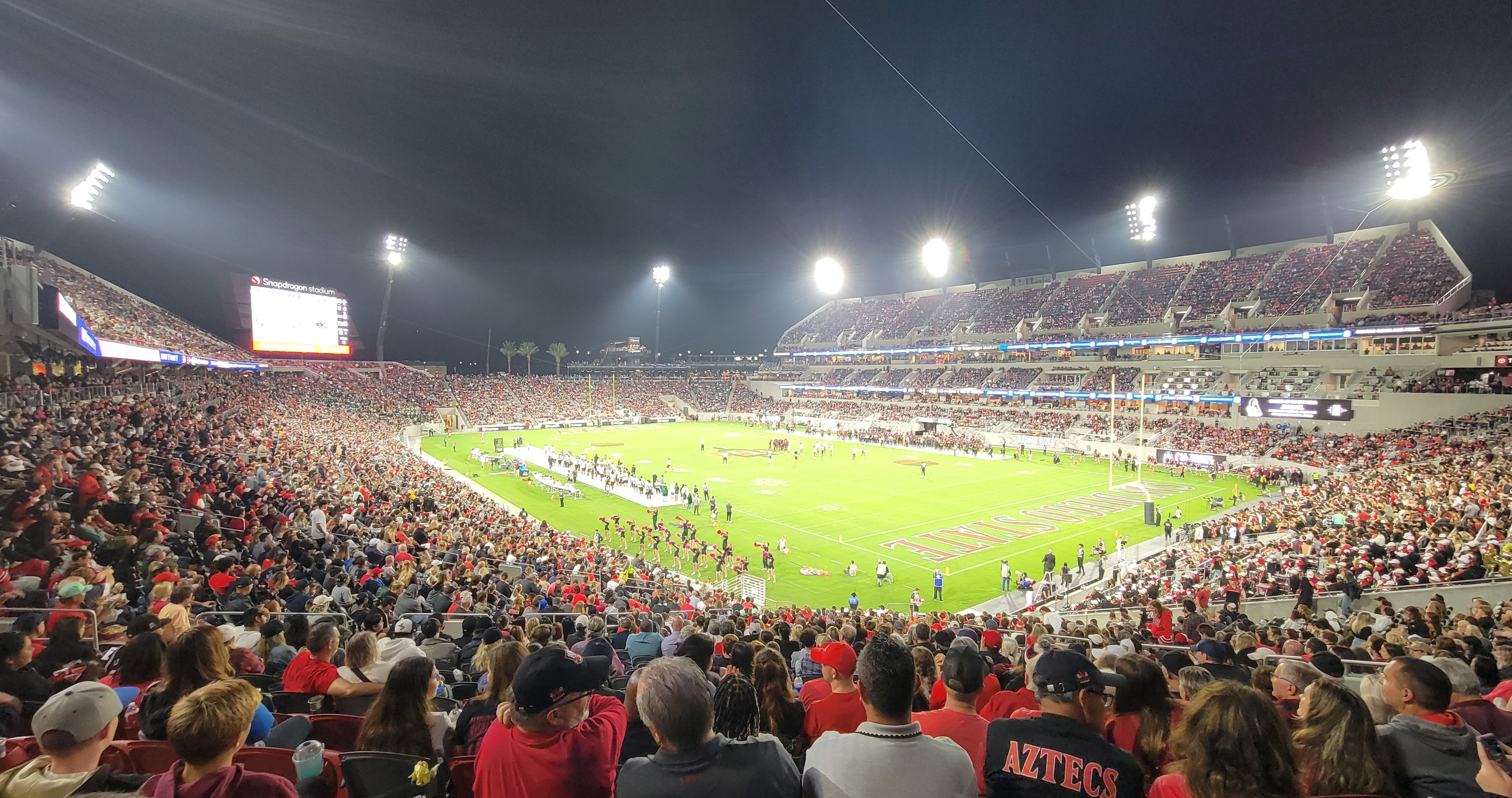
Snapdragon Stadium, home venue

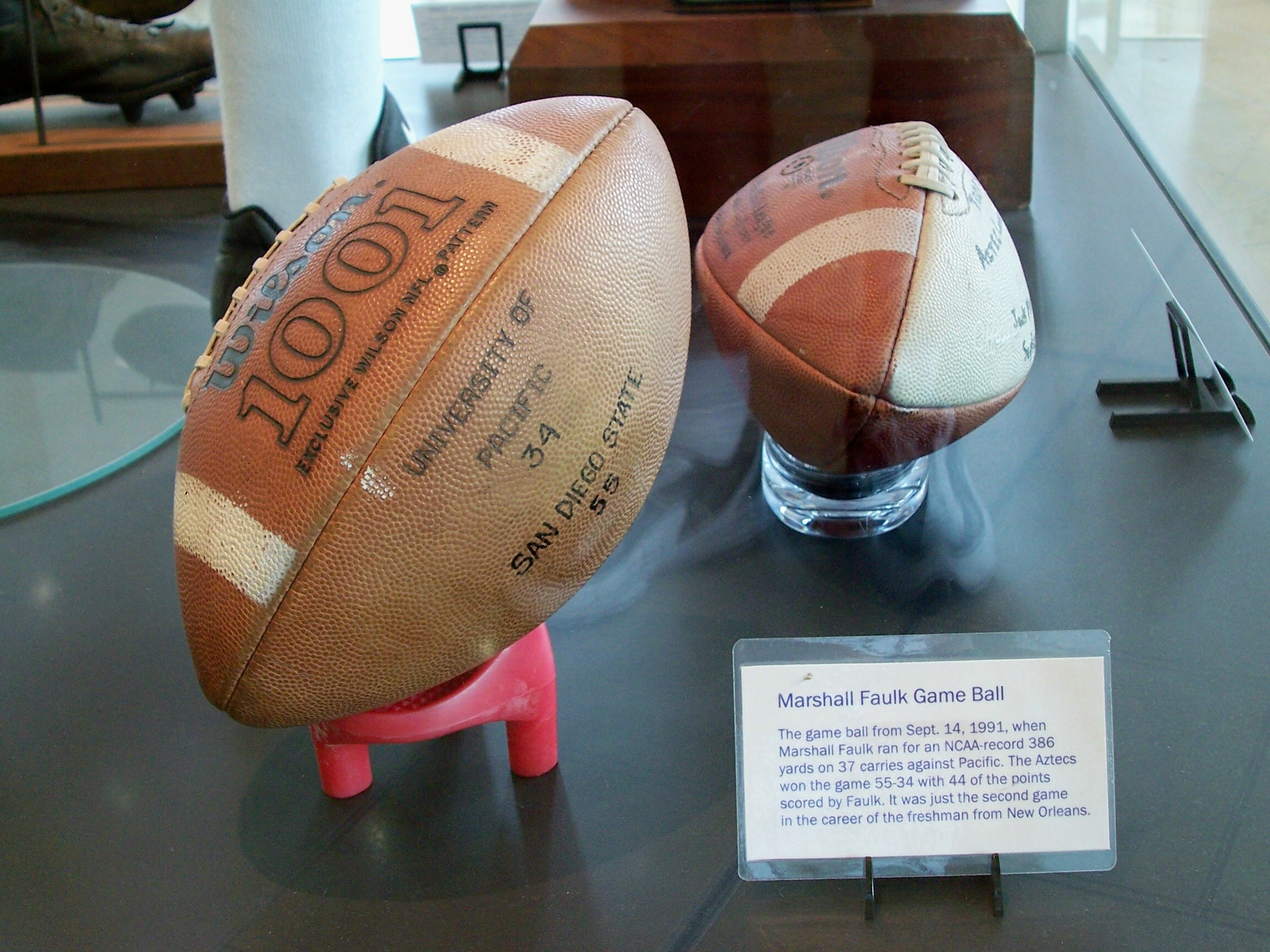
Marshall Faulk's game ball from the September 14, 1991, game, when he ran for an NCAA record 386 yards (353 m) and scored 44 points

- Head Coach: Sean Lewis
- Stadium: Snapdragon Stadium
- Conference championships: 19 (1922 • 1923 • 1924 • 1936 • 1937 • 1950 • 1951 • 1962 • 1966 • 1967 • 1969 • 1970 • 1972 • 1973 • 1974 • 1986 • 2012 • 2015 • 2016)
- NCAA postseason bowl game appearances: 20 (1948 Harbor Bowl • 1952 Pineapple Bowl • 1966 Camellia Bowl • 1967 Camellia Bowl • 1969 Pasadena Bowl • 1986 Holiday Bowl • 1991 Freedom Bowl • 1998 Las Vegas Bowl • 2010 Poinsettia Bowl • 2011 New Orleans Bowl • 2012 Poinsettia Bowl • 2013 Famous Idaho Potato Bowl • 2014 Poinsettia Bowl • 2015 Hawaii Bowl • 2016 Las Vegas Bowl • 2017 Armed Forces Bowl • 2018 Frisco Bowl • 2019 New Mexico Bowl • 2021 Frisco Bowl • 2022 Hawaii Bowl)

San Diego State University's football team is part of the highest level of American collegiate football, the Football Bowl Subdivision of Division I (which was formerly known as Division I-A). SDSU is 10–9 all time in post-season bowl games. They first went to a bowl game in 1948 and first won a major-college bowl game in 1969. Until the 2010 season, the Aztec football team had not won a bowl game in the past 37 years. In 2019, the Aztecs reached their 10th straight bowl game.

The Aztecs moved into the new Snapdragon Stadium, located in what had been the parking lot of the team's former home of San Diego Stadium, (Note: During the Aztecs' tenure in the stadium, the venue was also known as Jack Murphy Stadium, Qualcomm Stadium, and SDCCU Stadium.) for the 2022 season. During the construction of Snapdragon Stadium, the Aztecs played the 2020 and 2021 seasons at Dignity Health Sports Park in Carson, California. The team had played at San Diego Stadium from its opening in 1967 until its closure after the 2019 season; before that, it played in the on-campus Aztec Bowl (now the location of Viejas Arena).

| Date | Coach | Bowl | Opponent | Result |
|---|---|---|---|---|
| January 1, 1948 | Bill Schutte | Harbor Bowl | Hardin–Simmons | L 0–53 |
| January 1, 1952 | Bill Schutte | Pineapple Bowl | Hawaii | W 34–13 |
| December 10, 1966 | Don Coryell | Camellia Bowl | Montana State | W 28–7 |
| December 9, 1967 | Don Coryell | Camellia Bowl | San Francisco State | W 27–6 |
| December 6, 1969 | Don Coryell | Pasadena Bowl | Boston University | W 28–7 |
| December 30, 1986 | Denny Stolz | Holiday Bowl | #16 Iowa | L 38–39 |
| December 30, 1991 | Al Luginbill | Freedom Bowl | #23 Tulsa | L 17–28 |
| December 19, 1998 | Ted Tollner | Las Vegas Bowl | North Carolina | L 13–20 |
| December 23, 2010 | Brady Hoke | Poinsettia Bowl | Navy | W 35–14 |
| December 17, 2011 | Rocky Long | New Orleans Bowl | Louisiana | L 30–32 |
| December 20, 2012 | Rocky Long | Poinsettia Bowl | BYU | L 6–23 |
| December 21, 2013 | Rocky Long | Famous Idaho Potato Bowl | Buffalo | W 49–24 |
| December 23, 2014 | Rocky Long | Poinsettia Bowl | Navy | L 16–17 |
| December 24, 2015 | Rocky Long | Hawaii Bowl | Cincinnati | W 42–7 |
| December 17, 2016 | Rocky Long | Las Vegas Bowl | Houston | W 34–10 |
| December 23, 2017 | Rocky Long | Armed Forces Bowl | Army | L 35–42 |
| December 19, 2018 | Rocky Long | Frisco Bowl | Ohio | L 0–27 |
| December 21, 2019 | Rocky Long | New Mexico Bowl | Central Michigan | W 48–11 |
| December 21, 2021 | Brady Hoke | Frisco Bowl | UTSA | W 38–24 |
| December 24, 2022 | Brady Hoke | Hawaii Bowl | Middle Tennessee | L 25–23 |
| December 27, 2025 | Sean Lewis | New Mexico Bowl | North Texas | L 47–49 |

==== Basketball ====
- Head Coach: Brian Dutcher
- Arena: Viejas Arena
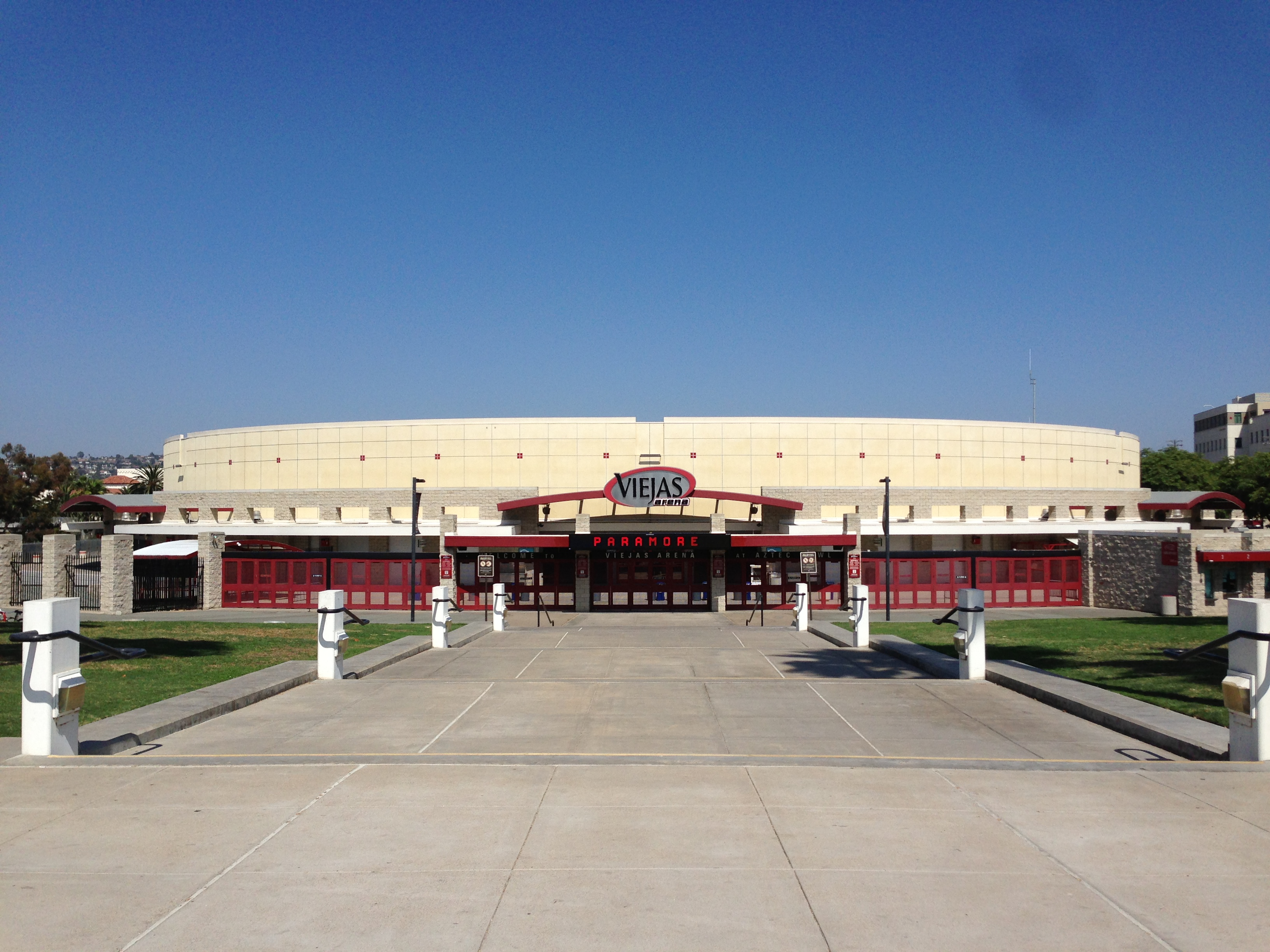
  Viejas Arena
- Conference regular season championships: 24 (1923 • 1925 • 1932 • 1934 • 1937 • 1939 • 1941 • 1942 • 1954 • 1957 • 1958 • 1967 • 1968 • 1977 • 1978 • 2006 • 2011 • 2012 • 2014 • 2015 • 2016 • 2020 • 2021 • 2023)
- Conference tournament championships: 9 (1976 • 1985 • 2002 • 2006 • 2010 • 2011 • 2018 • 2021 • 2023)
- NCAA Division I men's basketball tournament appearances: 16 (1975 • 1976 • 1985 • 2002 • 2006 • 2010 • 2011 • 2012 • 2013 • 2014 • 2015 • 2018 • 2021 • 2022 • 2023 • 2024)

Aztec basketball alumni who became more famous outside the sport include 1930s player Art Linkletter, who went on to an illustrious entertainment career that spanned more than 70 years, and Tony Gwynn, who also played baseball at San Diego State and opted for that sport professionally, ending up in the Baseball Hall of Fame.

In the 2010–11 season, the men's team had a record of 32–2 to capture a share of the Mountain West Conference title. They won the conference tournament outright for the automatic berth to the 2011 NCAA Division I men's basketball tournament. The only losses of the regular season were to another top 10 ranked team, BYU, who the Aztecs later beat to win the conference tournament. They earned a 2nd seed in the NCAA tournament, advancing to the Sweet 16. In the 2013–2014 season, the Aztecs finished 29–4, again reaching the NCAA tournament's Sweet 16 round.

The Aztecs reached the Elite Eight, Final Four, and the National Championship for the first time during the 2022–23 season, where they finished runner-up to UConn. The Aztecs returned to the tournament in 2024, reaching the Sweet Sixteen.

| Year | Seed | Round | Opponent | Result |
|---|---|---|---|---|
| 1975 | | Round of 32 | #16 UNLV | L 80–90 |
| 1976 | | Round of 32 | #5 UCLA | L 64–74 |
| 1985 | 13 W | Round of 64 | (4) #9 UNLV | L 80–85 |
| 2002 | 13 M | Round of 64 | (4) #13 Illinois | L 64–93 |
| 2006 | 11 W | Round of 64 | (6) Indiana | L 83–87 |
| 2010 | 11 M | Round of 64 | (6) #15 Tennessee | L 59–62 |
| 2011 | 2 W | Round of 64; Round of 32; Sweet Sixteen | (15) Northern Colorado (7) Temple (3) #9 Connecticut | W 68–50; W 71–64 ^{2OT} L 67–74 |
| 2012 | 6 M | Round of 64 | (11) NC State | L 65–79 |
| 2013 | 7 S | Round of 64; Round of 32 | (10) Oklahoma (15) Florida Gulf Coast | W 70–55; L 71–81 |
| 2014 | 4 W | Round of 64; Round of 32; Sweet Sixteen | (13) New Mexico State (12) North Dakota State (1) #4 Arizona | W 73–69 ^{OT} W 63–44; L 64–70 |
| 2015 | 8 S | Round of 64; Round of 32 | (9) St. John's (1) #4 Duke | W 76–64; L 49–68 |
| 2018 | 11 W | Round of 64 | (6) #21 Houston | L 65–67 |
| 2021 | 6 MW | Round of 64 | (11) Syracuse | L 62–78 |
| 2022 | 8 MW | Round of 64 | (9) Creighton | L 69–72 ^{OT} |
| 2023 | 5 S | Round of 64; Round of 32; Sweet Sixteen; Elite Eight; Final Four; National Championship | (12) Charleston (13) Furman (1) #1 Alabama (6) Creighton (9) #25 Florida Atlantic (4) #10 UConn | W 63–57; W 75–52; W 71–64; W 57–56; W 72–71; L 59–76 |
| 2024 | 5 E | Round of 64; Round of 32; Sweet Sixteen | (12) UAB (13) Yale (1) #1 UConn | W 69–65; W 85–57; L 82–52 |
| 2025 | 11 | First Four | (11) North Carolina | L 68–95 |

==== Golf ====
- Head Coach: Ryan Donovan
- Mountain West Conference championships: 3 (2011, 2012, 2015, 2022, 2023, 2024, 2025)
- NCAA Division I Men's Golf Championships appearances: 23 (1960, 1962, 1965, 1966, 1967, 1970, 1976, 1977, 1978, 1979, 1980, 1981, 1982, 1983, 1984, 1999, 2003, 2005, 2008, 2011, 2012, 2015, 2016)

The Aztecs men's golf team has more NCAA postseason appearances than any other San Diego State athletic team. Notable alumni include major champions Gene Littler, Xander Schauffele, and J.J. Spaun. In 2017, Schauffele received the 2017 PGA Tour Rookie of the Year award.

| Year | Finish | Score |
|---|---|---|
| 1950 | 10th | 606 |
| 1960 | 14th | 625 |
| 1962 | 15th | 637 |
| 1965 | 24th | 620 |
| 1966 | 6th | 604 |
| 1967 | 23rd | 613 |
| 1970 | 16th | 1,230 |
| 1971 | 20th | 585 |
| 1972 | 16th | 603 |
| 1974 | 17th | 606 |
| 1975 | 19th | 606 |
| 1976 | 18th | 1,205 |
| 1977 | 15th | 1,248 |
| 1978 | 12th | 1,190 |
| 1979 | 26th | 943 |
| 1980 | 22nd | 917 |
| 1981 | 21st | 895 |
| 1982 | 14th | 1,178 |
| 1983 | 23rd | 909 |
| 1984 | 24th | 889 |
| 1999 | 29th | 628 |
| 2003 | 30th | 965 |
| 2005 | 23rd | 893 |
| 2008 | 14th | 1,222 |
| 2011 | 16th | 898 |
| 2012 | 5th | 871 |
| 2015 | 15th | 1,193 |
| 2017 | 25th | 872 |

==== Soccer ====
- Head Coach: Ryan Hopkins
- Home field: SDSU Sports Deck
- NCAA Division I Men's Soccer Championship appearances: 8 (1969 • 1982 • 1987 • 1988 • 1989 • 2005 • 2006 • 2016)

The San Diego State men's soccer team competes in the Western Athletic Conference. In 1987, the Aztecs reached the NCAA Men's Soccer Championship Final, losing in the game by a score of 0–2 to Clemson. The team has an overall NCAA Division Tournament record of 5–8 through eight appearances. Lev Kirshner was head coach for over two decades.

| Year | Round | Opponent | Result |
|---|---|---|---|
| 1969 | Second round | San Francisco | L 1–2 |
| 1982 | First round Second round | Fresno State; San Francisco | W 1–0; L 0–2 |
| 1987 | First round Second round Third round Semifinals; National Championship | Saint Louis; SMU; UCLA; Harvard; Clemson | W 2–1; W 3–2; W 2–1; W 2–1; L 0–2 |
| 1988 | First round | UCLA | L 1–2 |
| 1989 | First round | UCLA | L 1–2 |
| 2005 | First round | UC Santa Barbara | L 0–2 |
| 2006 | First round | UC Santa Barbara | L 1–2 |
| 2016 | First round | UNLV | L 1–2 |

==== Tennis ====
- Head Coach: Gene Carswell
- Home court: Aztec Tennis Center
- Mountain West Conference regular season championships: 6 (2002 • 2003 • 2005 • 2006 • 2007 • 2013)
- Mountain West Conference tournament championships: 3 (2002 • 2003 • 2005)
- NCAA Division I Men's Tennis Championship tournament appearances: 7 (1998 • 1999 • 2000 • 2002 • 2003 • 2005 • 2015)

| Year | Round | Opponent | Result |
|---|---|---|---|
| 1998 | Region VII Regional | New Mexico | L 2–4 |
| 1999 | First round Second round | Tulsa; UCLA | W 4–1; L 1–4 |
| 2000 | First round Second round Round of 16 | Washington; Pepperdine; VCU | W 4–3; W 4–2; L 3–4 |
| 2002 | First round Second round | Hampton; UCLA | W 5–0; L 1–4 |
| 2003 | First round Second round | San Diego; Washington | W 5–0; L 3–4 |
| 2005 | First round | Cal | L 1–4 |
| 2015 | First round Second round | San Diego; USC | W 4–3; L 0–4 |

=== Women's varsity sports ===
==== Basketball ====
- Head Coach: Stacie Terry-Hutson
- Arena: Viejas Arena
- Conference regular season championships: 6 (1994 • 1995 • 1997 • 2009 • 2012 • 2013)
- Conference tournament championships: 4 (1994 • 1997 • 2010 • 2012)
- NCAA Division I women's basketball tournament appearances: 9 (1984 • 1985 • 1993 • 1994 • 1995 • 1997 • 2009 • 2010 • 2012)

| Year | Seed | Round | Opponent | Result |
|---|---|---|---|---|
| 1984 | #6 | First round Regional semifinals | #3 Oregon #2 Long Beach State | W 70–63; L 73–91 |
| 1985 | #5 | First round Regional semifinals | #4 UNLV #1 Louisiana Tech | W 70–68; L 64–94 |
| 1993 | #9 | First round | #8 Georgia | L 68–85 |
| 1994 | #5 | First round Second round | #12 Hawaii #13 Texas A&M | W 81–75; L 72–75 |
| 1995 | #5 | First round | #12 Montana | L 46–57 |
| 1997 | #11 | First round | #6 Oregon | L 62–79 |
| 2009 | #10 | First round Second round | #7 DePaul #2 Stanford | W 76–70; L 49–77 |
| 2010 | #11 | First round Second round Regional semifinals | #6 Texas #3 West Virginia #2 Duke | W 74–63; W 64–55; L 58–66 |
| 2012 | #12 | First round | #5 LSU | L 56–64 |

==== Cross Country ====
- Head Coach: Shelia Burrell
- Home field: Morley Field
- NCAA Women's Division I Cross Country Championship appearances: 1 (1981)

The San Diego State Aztecs women's cross country team has appeared in the NCAA tournament one time, with that appearance resulting in 7th place in the 1981–82 school year.

| Year | Finish | Points |
|---|---|---|
| 1981 | 7th | 169 |

==== Golf ====
- Head Coach: Lauren Dobashi
- Mountain West Conference championships: 2 (2015 • 2019)

Notable alumni include 2015 graduate Paige Spiranac.

==== Lacrosse ====
- Head Coach: Kylee White
- Home field: Aztec Lacrosse Field
- Conference championships: 2 (MPSF) (2018 • 2019)

The women's lacrosse team began play in 2012 and will play its first season in the Big 12 Conference in spring 2025. The Aztecs had played in the Mountain Pacific Sports Federation before that conference dropped the sport after the 2021 season (2020–21 school year) due to a lack of competing members. They then spent the next two seasons as an independent before becoming an affiliate member of the Pac-12 Conference in the 2024 season, the last before that conference's collapse. The Aztecs became one of the six inaugural members of Big 12 women's lacrosse, joined by full members Arizona State, Cincinnati, and Colorado plus fellow affiliates Florida and UC Davis.

==== Soccer ====
- Head Coach: Mike Friesen
- Home field: SDSU Sports Deck
- Mountain West Conference regular season championships: 6 (1999 • 2012 • 2013 • 2014 • 2015 • 2019)
- Mountain West Conference tournament championships: 5 (2009 • 2012 • 2013 • 2014 • 2017)
- NCAA Division I Women's Soccer Championship appearances: 7 (1998 • 1999 • 2009 • 2012 • 2013 • 2014 • 2017)

The Aztecs women's soccer team have an NCAA Division I Tournament record of 4–7 through seven appearances.

| Year | Round | Opponent | Result |
|---|---|---|---|
| 1998 | Second round Third round | USC; Portland | W 1–0; L 0–5 |
| 1999 | First round | San Diego | L 1–2 |
| 2009 | First round Second round | San Diego; UCLA | W 1–0; L 0–5 |
| 2012 | First round Second round Third round | CSU Northridge; Cal; UCLA | W 3–0; W 2–1; L 0–3 |
| 2013 | First round | UCLA | L 0–3 |
| 2014 | First round | Cal | L 2–3 |
| 2017 | First round | UCLA | L 1–3 |

==== Softball ====
- Head Coach: Stacey Nuveman Deniz
- Stadium: SDSU Softball Stadium
- Mountain West Conference championships: 8 (2001 • 2002 • 2003 • 2006 • 2008 • 2012 • 2013 • 2014)
- NCAA Division I softball tournament appearances: 11 (2001 • 2003 • 2006 • 2008 • 2009 • 2010 • 2011 • 2012 • 2013 • 2014 • 2015)

| Year | Tournament Record | Notes |
|---|---|---|
| 2001 | 3–2 | Lost in the Region 2 Regional finals to UCLA. |
| 2003 | 1–2 | Eliminated by Oregon in the Region 6 Regional. |
| 2006 | 2-2 | Lost in the Los Angeles Regional finals to UCLA. |
| 2008 | 1–2 | Eliminated by Fresno State in the Gainesville Regional. |
| 2009 | 0–2 | Eliminated by Cal State Fullerton in the Tempe Regional. |
| 2010 | 1–2 | Eliminated by Fresno State in the Los Angeles Regional. |
| 2011 | 2-2 | Lost in the Tempe Regional finals to Arizona State. |
| 2012 | 2-2 | Lost in the Tampa Regional finals to Hofstra. |
| 2013 | 1–2 | Eliminated by Georgia in the Tempe Regional. |
| 2014 | 1–2 | Eliminated by Michigan in the Tallahassee Regional. |
| 2015 | 2-2 | Lost in the Los Angeles Regional finals to UCLA. |

==== Swimming & Diving ====
- Head Coach: Mike Schrader
- Home pool: Aztec Aquaplex
- Mountain West Conference regular season championships: 1 (2011)
- Mountain West Conference tournament championships: 4 (2011 • 2013 • 2015 • 2019)
- NCAA Division I Women's Swimming and Diving Championships appearances: 8 (1982 • 2010 • 2012 • 2013 • 2014 • 2015 • 2017 • 2019)

| Year | Finish |
|---|---|
| 1982 | 23rd |
| 2010 | 42nd |
| 2012 | 45th |
| 2013 | 41st |
| 2014 | 27th |
| 2015 | 39th |
| 2017 | 46th |
| 2019 | 38th |

==== Tennis ====
- Head Coach: Peter Mattera
- Home court: Aztec Tennis Center
- Mountain West Conference regular season championships: 3 (2002 • 2003 • 2013)
- Mountain West Conference tournament championships: 1 (2003)
- NCAA Division I Women's Tennis Championship appearances: 22 (1982 • 1983 • 1984 • 1985 • 1986 • 1989 • 1990 • 1991 • 1992 • 1993 • 1996 • 1997 • 1998 • 1999 • 2000 • 2002 • 2003 • 2005 • 2006 • 2007 • 2009 • 2013)

| Year | Round | Opponent | Result |
|---|---|---|---|
| 1982 | First round Quarterfinals | Northwestern; Trinity | W 8–1; L 3–6 |
| 1983 | First round Quarterfinals | Miami (FL); Stanford | W 5–4; L 4–5 |
| 1984 | First round Quarterfinals; Semifinals; Third-place game | Cal; Texas; Stanford; Trinity | W 7–2; W 6–3; L 2–7; L 4–5 |
| 1985 | First round Quarterfinals | Northwestern; USC | W 6–3; L 0–9 |
| 1986 | First round | Oklahoma State | L 3–6 |
| 1989 | First round Second round | William & Mary; Stanford | W 6–3; L 0–9 |
| 1990 | First round | Indiana | L 3–5 |
| 1991 | First round Second round | Tennessee; Stanford | W 5–1; L 1–5 |
| 1992 | First round Second round | Kansas; Duke | W 5–4; L 1–5 |
| 1993 | First round | Ole Miss | L 3–5 |
| 1996 | West Regional | Arizona State | L 4–5 |
| 1997 | West Regional; West Regional | Oregon; Pepperdine | W 5–2; L 2–5 |
| 1998 | West Regional; West Regional | San Diego; USC | W 5–2; L 1–5 |
| 1999 | California Regional | Marquette | L 1–5 |
| 2000 | First round Second round | South Florida; Wake Forest | W 5–0; L 0–5 |
| 2002 | First round | Arizona | L 3–4 |
| 2003 | First round | Fresno State | L 0–4 |
| 2005 | First round | Arizona State | L 0–4 |
| 2006 | First round | UCLA | L 0–4 |
| 2007 | First round | Florida State | L 0–4 |
| 2009 | First round | Washington | L 0–4 |
| 2013 | First round | Baylor | L 1–4 |

==== Track & Field (Indoor and Outdoor) ====
- Head Coach: Shelia Burrell
- Home track: Aztrack at SDSU Sports Deck
- Mountain West Conference indoor championships: 1 (2013)
- Mountain West Conference outdoor championships: 5 (2003 • 2013 • 2014 • 2017 • 2018)
- NCAA Women's Division I Indoor Track and Field Championships appearances: 10 (2006 • 2008 • 2009 • 2010 • 2012 • 2013 • 2014 • 2017 • 2018 • 2019)
- NCAA Women's Division I Outdoor Track and Field Championships appearances: 22 (1982 • 1983 • 1984 • 1985 • 1986 • 1998 • 1999 • 2001 • 2003 • 2004 • 2005 • 2007 • 2008 • 2009 • 2011 • 2012 • 2013 • 2014 • 2016 • 2017 • 2018 • 2019)

| Year | Competition | Finish |
|---|---|---|
| 2006 | Indoor | 51st |
| 2008 | Indoor | 33rd |
| 2009 | Indoor | 34th |
| 2010 | Indoor | 21st |
| 2012 | Indoor | 48th |
| 2013 | Indoor | 25th |
| 2014 | Indoor | 19th |
| 2017 | Indoor | 21st |
| 2018 | Indoor | 17th |
| 2019 | Indoor | 27th |

| Year | Competition | Finish |
|---|---|---|
| 1982 | Outdoor | 10th |
| 1983 | Outdoor | 24th |
| 1984 | Outdoor | 11th |
| 1985 | Outdoor | 9th |
| 1986 | Outdoor | 20th |
| 1998 | Outdoor | 51st |
| 1999 | Outdoor | 62nd |
| 2001 | Outdoor | 37th |
| 2003 | Outdoor | 29th |
| 2004 | Outdoor | 27th |
| 2005 | Outdoor | 29th |
| 2007 | Outdoor | 46th |
| 2008 | Outdoor | 31st |
| 2009 | Outdoor | 25th |
| 2011 | Outdoor | 60th |
| 2012 | Outdoor | 9th |
| 2013 | Outdoor | 23rd |
| 2014 | Outdoor | 12th |
| 2016 | Outdoor | 20th |
| 2017 | Outdoor | 32nd |
| 2018 | Outdoor | 46th |
| 2019 | Outdoor | 32nd |

==== Volleyball ====
- Head Coach: Brent Hilliard
- Home arena: Aztec Court at Peterson Gymnasium
- Mountain West Conference regular season championships: 1 (2012)
- NCAA Division I women's volleyball tournament appearances: 14 (1981 • 1982 • 1983 • 1984 • 1985 • 1986 • 1988 • 1989 • 1990 • 1994 • 1995 • 1996 • 2001 • 2012)

The Aztecs women's volleyball team have an NCAA Division I Tournament record of 13–14 through fourteen appearances.

| Year | Round | Opponent | Result |
|---|---|---|---|
| 1981 | Regional semifinals Regional Finals; Semifinals | New Mexico; UC Santa Barbara; UCLA | W 3–0; W 3–0; L 1–3 |
| 1982 | Regional semifinals Regional Finals; Semifinals | Cal; UCLA; USC | W 3–1; W 3–1; L 0–3 |
| 1983 | First round Regional semifinals Regional Finals | Colorado State; Arizona; Stanford | W 3–0; W 3–1; L 0–3 |
| 1984 | First round Regional semifinals | BYU; USC | W 3–0; L 0–3 |
| 1985 | First round | Hawaii | L 1–3 |
| 1986 | First round Regional semifinals | UC Santa Barbara; Pacific | W 3–1; L 0–3 |
| 1988 | First round Regional semifinals | San Jose State; Hawaii | W 3–1; L 0–3 |
| 1989 | First round | Long Beach State | L 0–3 |
| 1990 | First round Regional semifinals | BYU; Stanford | W 3–1; L 1–3 |
| 1994 | First round Second round | Memphis; Arizona State | W 3–1; L 2–3 |
| 1995 | Second round Regional semifinals | Long Beach State; Michigan State | W 3–1; L 0–3 |
| 1996 | First round Second round | Sam Houston State; Texas | W 3–1; L 0–3 |
| 2001 | First round | Long Beach State | L 0–3 |
| 2012 | First round | Saint Mary's | L 2–3 |

==== Water Polo ====
- Head Coach: Carin Crawford
- Home pool: Aztec Aquaplex
- NCAA Women's Water Polo Championship appearances: 3 (2007 • 2008 • 2016)

| Year | Finish |
|---|---|
| 2007 | 4th |
| 2008 | 5th |
| 2016 | 8th |

== Conference affiliations ==
San Diego State has been a member of seven different athletic conferences in its history.

- Southern California Junior College Conference (1921–1924)
- Southern California Intercollegiate Athletic Conference (1926–1938)
- California Collegiate Athletic Association (1939–1967)
- Pacific Coast Athletic Association (1969–1975)
- Independent (1925, 1968, 1976–1977)
- Western Athletic Conference (1978–1998)
- Mountain West Conference (1999–2025)
- Pac-12 Conference (2026–present)

== Former sports ==
In the past, San Diego State, like most American universities, has sponsored several additional varsity sports programs to those currently offered. These programs have since been discontinued. Budgeting and Title IX equity challenges have been cited as the primary reasons for these programs being cut. In some cases (notably men's crew and men's volleyball), club teams have emerged in place of discontinued sports programs.

=== Men's former varsity sports ===
Crew

- Year discontinued: 1976

Cross Country

- Year discontinued: 1993
- NCAA Men's Division I Cross Country Championship team appearances: 3 (1968 • 1970 • 1976)
- NCAA Men's Division II Cross Country Championship team national championships: 3 (1965 • 1966 • 1967)

The Aztecs men's cross country team won three consecutive NCAA Division II national championships in 1965, 1966, and 1967 shortly before the program's ascension to Division I.

| Year | Finish | Points |
|---|---|---|
| 1968 | 6th | 247 |
| 1970 | 9th | 356 |
| 1976 | 8th | 361 |

Gymnastics

- Year discontinued: 1974
- NCAA Men's Gymnastics Championships team appearances: 1 (1959)

| Year | Finish |
|---|---|
| 1959 | 18th |

Swimming & Diving

- Year discontinued: 1985
- NCAA Division I Men's Swimming and Diving Championships team appearances: 1 (1969)
- NCAA Men's Division II Swimming and Diving Championships team national championships: 2 (1965 • 1966)

Men's swimming & diving won back-to-back NCAA Division II national championships in 1965 and 1966 shortly before the program's transition to Division I.

| Year | Finish |
|---|---|
| 1969 | 27th |

Track & Field (Indoor and Outdoor)

- Year discontinued: 1992
- NCAA Division I Men's Indoor Track and Field Championships team appearances: 1 (1979)
- NCAA Division I Men's Outdoor Track and Field Championships team appearances: 14 (1965 • 1966 • 1969 • 1970 • 1971 • 1974 • 1976 • 1977 • 1979 • 1980 • 1982 • 1983 • 1984 • 1989)
- NCAA Division II Men's Outdoor Track and Field Championships team national championships: 2 (1965 • 1966)

The men's track & field team won back-to-back NCAA Division II outdoor national championships in 1965 and 1966 shortly before the program's transition to Division I.

| Year | Competition | Finish |
|---|---|---|
| 1979 | Indoor | 60th |

| Year | Competition | Finish |
|---|---|---|
| 1965 | Outdoor | 25th |
| 1966 | Outdoor | 24th |
| 1969 | Outdoor | 19th |
| 1970 | Outdoor | 12th |
| 1971 | Outdoor | 35th |
| 1974 | Outdoor | 16th |
| 1976 | Outdoor | 19th |
| 1977 | Outdoor | 55th |
| 1979 | Outdoor | 28th |
| 1980 | Outdoor | 41st |
| 1982 | Outdoor | 53rd |
| 1983 | Outdoor | 74th |
| 1984 | Outdoor | 71st |
| 1989 | Outdoor | 67th |

Volleyball

- Year discontinued: 2001
- NCAA men's volleyball tournament appearances: 2 (1972 • 1973)
- NCAA men's volleyball tournament National Championship: 1 (1973)

The men's volleyball team won San Diego State's first (and to-date only) NCAA Division I National Championship in 1973. The team's home court was Peterson Gymnasium.

| Year | Round | Opponent | Result |
|---|---|---|---|
| 1972 | Semifinals; Championship | UC Santa Barbara; UCLA | W 3–2; L 2–3 |
| 1973 | Semifinals; Championship | Ball State; Long Beach State | W 3–0; W 3–1 |

Water Polo

- Year discontinued: 1978

Despite coming off a season in which the team was ranked in the top 10 nationally, the men's water polo team, along with other programs, was cut, due to a combination of a lack in athletic department funding, Proposition 13's passage, and necessity to comply with Title IX.

Wrestling

- Year discontinued: 1992
- NCAA Division I Wrestling Championships team appearances: 3 (1956 • 1969 • 1992)

In 1949, San Diego State wrestler Harold Hensen became the first African-American to compete in an NCAA wrestling championship tournament when he competed in individual competition at the NCAA Division I Wrestling Championships.

| Year | Finish | Points |
|---|---|---|
| 1956 | 33rd | 1 |
| 1969 | 17th | 15 |
| 1992 | 41st | 5 |

=== Women's former varsity sports ===
Field Hockey

- Year discontinued: 1978

Gymnastics

- Year discontinued: 1985

==== Rowing ====
- Year discontinued: 2021

The women's rowing team, which had last competed in the American Athletic Conference, was discontinued following the 2020–21 academic year due to ongoing Title IX gender equity challenges and financial stress on the athletics department brought on by the COVID-19 pandemic. The team's home was the Mission Bay Aquatic Center.

== Athletic facilities ==
=== Venues ===
| Facility | Team(s) | Opened |
|---|---|---|
| Snapdragon Stadium | Football | 2022 |
| Viejas Arena | Basketball (men's) Basketball (women's) | 1997 |
| Tony Gwynn Stadium | Baseball | 1997 |
| Peterson Gymnasium | Volleyball (women's) | 1961 |
| SDSU Sports Deck / Aztrack | Soccer (men's) Soccer (women's) Track & field (women's) | 2000 |
| Aztec Aquaplex | Swimming & diving (women's) Water polo (women's) | 2007 |
| Aztec Lacrosse Field | Lacrosse (women's) | 2011 |
| Aztec Tennis Center | Tennis (men's) Tennis (women's) | 2005 |
| SDSU Softball Stadium | Softball | 2005 |

=== Other facilities ===
| Facility | Description | Opened |
|---|---|---|
| Fowler Athletics Center | Athletics department headquarters and Aztec Hall of Fame | 2001 |
| Jeff Jacobs JAM Center | Practice facility for men's and women's basketball | 2015 |
| Mission Bay Aquatic Center | Facility in Mission Bay co-owned and operated with the University of California, San Diego that provides opportunities for many outdoor activities and water sports for SDSU students. Home to club sports teams such as men's crew and waterskiing and wakesports. | 1974 |

== Non-varsity club sports ==
In addition to the varsity sports officially sponsored by the athletic department, San Diego State also supports several club-level sports, most operating through the Aztec Recreation Center.

Sports with both varsity and club-level teams at the university include baseball and soccer among men's sports, and lacrosse, soccer, volleyball and water polo among women's sports.

=== Co-ed club teams ===
- Cycling
- Sailing
- Skiing & Snowboarding
- Surfing
- Tennis
- Triathlon
- Waterskiing & Wakesports

=== Men's club teams ===
- Baseball
- Crew
- Ice Hockey
- Lacrosse
- Rugby
- Soccer
- Ultimate Frisbee
- Volleyball
- Water Polo

=== Women's club teams ===
- Dance
- Gymnastics
- Lacrosse
- Soccer
- Ultimate Frisbee
- Volleyball
- Water Polo

== Championships ==
=== NCAA tournament appearances ===
The San Diego State Aztecs have competed in the NCAA tournament across 16 active sports (6 men's and 10 women's) 191 times at the Division I FBS level.

- Baseball (14): 1979 • 1981 • 1982 • 1983 • 1984 • 1986 • 1990 • 1991 • 2009 • 2013 • 2014 • 2015 • 2017 • 2018
- Men's basketball (14): 1975 • 1976 • 1985 • 2002 • 2006 • 2010 • 2011 • 2012 • 2013 • 2014 • 2015 • 2018 • 2021 • 2022
- Women's basketball (9): 1984 • 1985 • 1993 • 1994 • 1995 • 1997 • 2009 • 2010 • 2012
- Women's cross country (1): 1981
- Football (18): 1947 • 1951 • 1966 • 1967 • 1969 • 1986 • 1991 • 1998 • 2010 • 2011 • 2012 • 2013 • 2014 • 2015 • 2016 • 2017 • 2018 • 2019
- Men's golf (23): 1960 • 1962 • 1965 • 1966 • 1967 • 1970 • 1976 • 1977 • 1978 • 1979 • 1980 • 1981 • 1982 • 1983 • 1984 • 1999 • 2003 • 2005 • 2008 • 2011 • 2012 • 2015 • 2016
- Men's soccer (8): 1969 • 1982 • 1987 • 1988 • 1989 • 2005 • 2006 • 2016
- Women's soccer (7): 1998 • 1999 • 2009 • 2012 • 2013 • 2014 • 2017
- Softball (11): 2001 • 2003 • 2006 • 2008 • 2009 • 2010 • 2011 • 2012 • 2013 • 2014 • 2015 2022
- Women's swimming and diving (8): 1982 • 2010 • 2012 • 2013 • 2014 • 2015 • 2017 • 2019
- Men's tennis (7): 1998 • 1999 • 2000 • 2002 • 2003 • 2005 • 2015
- Women's tennis (22): 1982 • 1983 • 1984 • 1985 • 1986 • 1989 • 1990 • 1991 • 1992 • 1993 • 1996 • 1997 • 1998 • 1999 • 2000 • 2002 • 2003 • 2005 • 2006 • 2007 • 2009 • 2013
- Women's indoor track and field (10): 2006 • 2008 • 2009 • 2010 • 2012 • 2013 • 2014 • 2017 • 2018 • 2019
- Women's outdoor track and field (22): 1982 • 1983 • 1984 • 1985 • 1986 • 1998 • 1999 • 2001 • 2003 • 2004 • 2005 • 2007 • 2008 • 2009 • 2011 • 2012 • 2013 • 2014 • 2016 • 2017 • 2018 • 2019
- Women's volleyball (14): 1981 • 1982 • 1983 • 1984 • 1985 • 1986 • 1988 • 1989 • 1990 • 1994 • 1995 • 1996 • 2001 • 2012
- Women's water polo (3): 2007 • 2008 • 2016

=== National championships ===
==== Division I championships ====
The Aztecs of San Diego State have earned 1 NCAA national championship at the Division I level.

- Men's Volleyball (1): 1973

| School year | Sport | Opponent | Score |
|---|---|---|---|
| 1972–73 | Men's volleyball | Long Beach State | 3–1 |

==== Division II championships ====
San Diego State won 7 national championships while at the Division II level.

- Men's cross country (3): 1965, 1966, 1967
- Men's track and field (outdoor) (2): 1965, 1966
- Men's swimming and diving (2): 1965, 1966

The Aztecs also claimed 3 national team titles at the varsity level while a member of NCAA Division II that were not bestowed by the NCAA (being awarded instead by sponsors of College Division football polls):

- Football (3): 1966 (both polls), 1967 (both polls), 1968 (coaches' poll) (NCAA College Division)

==== NAIA championship ====
Basketball (1): 1941 (NAIA)

==== Other championships ====
SDSU's cheerleading and dance teams have won national championships.

- Cheerleading (2): 2009, 2011
- Dance (1): 2011

Below are eleven national club team championships:

- Men's badminton (1): 1976 (ABA)
- Flowboarding (1): 2011 (CBS)
- Rugby (1): 1987 (USA Rugby)
- Sailing (2): 1968, 1969 (ICSA)
- Surfing (2): 2007, 2013 (NSSA)
- Men's water polo (2): 2017, 2026 (CWPA)
- Women's water polo (1): 2014 (CWPA)
- Waterskiing (2): 1979, 2006 (NCWSA)

=== Individual Championships ===
San Diego State has had 15 individuals win NCAA individual national championships at the Division I level.

NCAA individual championships
| Order | School year | Athlete(s) | Sport | Source |
|---|---|---|---|---|
| 1 | 1933–34 | Jack Rand | Men's outdoor track and field |
| 2 | 1946–47 | Willie Steele | Men's outdoor track and field |
| 3 | 1947–48 | Willie Steele | Men's outdoor track and field |
| 4 | 1948–49 | Bob Smith | Men's outdoor track and field |
| 5 | 1949–50 | Bob Smith | Men's outdoor track and field |
| 6 | 1964–65 | Larry Godfrey | Men's outdoor track and field |
| 7 | 1969–70 | Arnie Robinson | Men's outdoor track and field |
| 8 | 1975–76 | Quentin Wheeler | Men's outdoor track and field |
| 9 | 1983–84 | Ramona Pagel | Women's outdoor track and field |
| 10 | 1984–85 | Laura De Snoo | Women's outdoor track and field |
| 11 | 1984–85 | LaTanya Sheffield | Women's outdoor track and field |
| 12 | 2011–12 | Whitney Ashley | Women's outdoor track and field |
| 13 | 2012–13 | Shanieka Ricketts | Women's outdoor track and field |
| 14 | 2013–14 | Shanieka Ricketts | Women's indoor track and field |
| 15 | 2013–14 | Shanieka Ricketts | Women's outdoor track and field |

At the NCAA Division II level, San Diego State garnered 14 individual championships. In 1975 Barbara Barrow won the women's national intercollegiate individual golf championship after a tie-breaker playoff (an event conducted by the AIAW, which was succeeded by the current NCAA women's golf championship).

== National Award Winners ==
Corbett Award
| Year | Name | Position |
|---|---|---|
| 2000 | Cedric Dempsey | Athletic Director |
| 2007 | Fred L. Miller | Athletic Director |

== Rivals ==
=== BYU ===
SDSU athletics has had a rivalry with the BYU Cougars of Brigham Young University since at least the 1980s when both programs were members of the Western Athletic Conference. The rivalry intensified after both schools left the conference to become charter members of the Mountain West Conference in 1999. Through their many years in the same conferences, the Aztecs and Cougars were routinely tough competition for conference championships in numerous sports among both the men and women. The Cougars departed the Mountain West in 2011, though the programs continue to compete semi-regularly. Men's basketball and football have represented the most high-profile contests of the rivalry.

=== Fresno State ===
San Diego State has a longtime rivalry with California State University, Fresno, primarily stemming from the American football rivalry dating back to the 1920s. The two schools have competed against each other in over 55 football, 50 men's basketball, and 190 baseball matches.

=== San Diego ===
The Aztecs have a local rivalry with the University of San Diego's San Diego Toreros, emphasizing the competition in college men's basketball. The rivalry has featured many competitions in neutral locations such as Petco Park across many sports.

=== UC San Diego ===
Though more of a rivalry historically outside of sports, the University of California, San Diego, the other major public university in San Diego, represents another local rival of SDSU. The UC San Diego Tritons joined NCAA Division I in 2020. Similar to the way SDSU's student section, The Show, refers to the San Diego Toreros, they often refer to the UC San Diego Tritons as the "little brothers" or "little sisters".

=== San Jose State ===
El Camino Real Rivalry

The rivalry between the two Cal State schools dates back to 1935. The matchup is named after the historic 600-mile Camino Real that connects the 21 Spanish missions in California, stretching from San Diego Bay in the south to San Francisco Bay in the north.

In 2014, there were conversations between the two programs about creating a trophy using an old mission bell or a replica of an old Spanish mission bell to be awarded to the winner of the rivalry game, but no trophy ever materialized.

== Aztec Hall of Fame inductees ==
See: Hall of fame and footnote

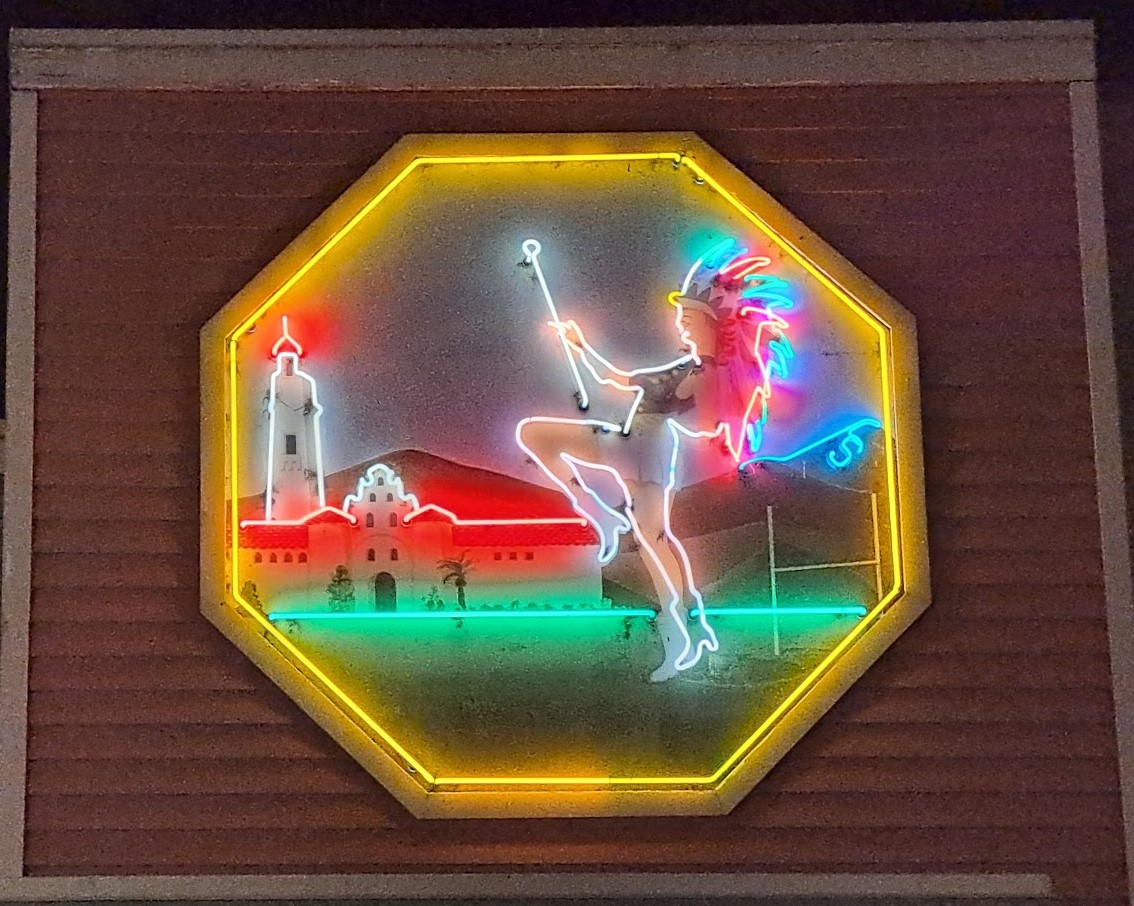
Historic Neon Aztec Majorette at the corner of College Avenue and El Cajon Boulevard

1988
• Chris Gaines - Aztec marching Band Singer (1988)
• Willie Buchanon - Football (1970–71)
• John D. Butler - Football (1933–35)
• Don Coryell - Football Coach (1961–72)
• Fred Dryer - Football (1967–68)
• Gary Garrison - Football (1964–65)
• Gene Littler - M. Golf (1949–52)
• Haven Moses - Football (1966–67)
• Graig Nettles - Baseball (1964–65); M. Basketball (1964–65)
• Charles E. Peterson - Football Coach (1921–29); M. Basketball Coach (1921–26);

Track & Field Coach (1922–46)
• Milton Phelps - M. Basketball (1939–41)
• Art Preston - Football (1949–51); Baseball (1950–52)
• Arnie Robinson - M. Track & Field (1970–71)
• Dennis Shaw - Football (1968–69)
• Brian Sipe - Football (1969–71)
• Willie Steele - M. Track & Field (1947–48); M. Basketball (1947); Baseball (1949)
1989
• Kevin Crow - M. Soccer (1979–82)
• Morris Gross - Baseball, M. Basketball, Football (1922–1924, 1926–1927);

M. Basketball Coach (1929–42); Baseball Coach (1931–1932); Director of Athletics (1935–1941)
• Tony Gwynn - Baseball (1979–81); M. Basketball (1978–81)
• Don Horn - Football (1965–66)
• Jack Rand - M. Track & Field (1934–35); Football (1932–34)
1990
• Tim Delaney - Football (1968–70)
• Art Linkletter - M. Basketball (1932–34); M. Swimming & Diving (1932–34)
• Judy Porter - W. Basketball (1980–83)
• Tom Reynolds - Football (1969–71)
1991
• Steve Copp - M. Basketball (1973–76)
• Chuck Courtney - M. Golf (1960–61)
• Tom Dahms - Football (1947–49)
• Monte Jackson - Football (1973–74)
1992
• Barbara Barrow - W. Golf (1974–77)
• Bud Black - Baseball (1978–79)
• Tony Pinkins - M. Basketball (1955–57)
• Bob Smith - M. Track & Field (1949–50)
• Charlie Smith - Baseball Coach (1934–64)
• Deby LaPlante - W. Track & Field (1979–80)
1993
• Tom Ables - Honorary
• Michael Cage - M. Basketball (1981–84)
• Vidal Fernandez - M. Soccer (1977–79)
• Ann Lebedeff - W. Tennis (1972–74)
• Tom Nettles - Football, M. Track & Field (1966–68)
• LaTanya Sheffield - W. Track & Field (1983–86)
1994
• Patricia Mang - Softball (1987–88)
• Chris Marlowe - M. Volleyball (1972–73); M. Basketball (1970–73)
• Bill Schutte - Football Coach (1947–55)
• Nate Wright - Football (1967–68)
• George Ziegenfuss - M. Basketball Coach (1948–69)
1995
• Marcelo Balboa - M. Soccer (1988–89)
• Bob Brady - M. Basketball (1952–54)
• Claudie Minor - Football (1972–73)
• Micki Schillig - W. Tennis (1980–83)
• Frank Scott - M. Golf Coach (1948–83)
1996
• Paul Mott - Football, M. Basketball, M. Track & Field (1925–28)
• Ramona Pagel - W. Track & Field (1983–84)
• Todd Santos - Football (1984–87)
• Eric Wynalda - M. Soccer (1987–89)
1997
• Vicki Cantrell - W. Volleyball (1980–83)
• Kenny Hale - M. Basketball (1941, 1946–47)
• Joel Kramer - M. Basketball (1974, 1976–78)
• Duncan McFarland - M. Volleyball (1973)
1998
• Marshall Faulk - Football (1991–93)
• Chris Gwynn - Baseball (1983–85)
• Mary Holland - W. Volleyball (1979–82)
• Dick Mitchell - M. Basketball (1940–42)
• Chana Perry - W. Basketball (1988–89)
1999
• Lennie Clements - M. Golf (1976–79)
• Laura De Snoo - W. Track & Field (1983–86)
• Harry Hodgetts - M. Basketball (1937–41)
• Carol Plunkett - W. Tennis Coach (1976–94)
• Wendy Wheat - W. Volleyball (1977–80)
2002
• 1940–41 Men's Basketball Team
• 1987 Men's Soccer Team
• Joe Gibbs - Football (1961–63); Football Coach (1965–66)
• Norm Nygaard - Football (1952–54)
• Falisha Wright - W. Basketball (1992–95)

2003
• 1973 Men's Volleyball National Champions
• Al Skalecky - M. Basketball (1966–67-68)
• Nicole Storto - W. Tennis (1990–93)
• Angela Rock - W. Volleyball (1981–84)
• Marla Runyan - W. Track & Field (1988–91)
2004
• Mike Douglass - Football (1976–77)
• Rod Dowhower - Football (1963–64)
• Claude Gilbert - Football Coach (1967–80, 1995–99)
• Travis Lee - Baseball (1994–96)
• Ron Reina - Broadcaster (1969–86)
• Carrie McLaughlin Stathas - W. Track & Field (1981–83)

2005
• 1987 Men's Rugby National Champion
• Hank Allison - Football (1969–70)
• Kern Carson - Football (1961–63)
• Bernie Finlay - Basketball (1958–60)
• Lynn Kanuka-Williams - W. Cross Country, W. Track & Field (1980–82)
2006
• Bob Breitbard - Football (1938–40 Player, 1945 Coach)
• Kim Goetz - M. Basketball (1978–79)
• Cynthia MacGregor - W. Tennis (1983–86)
• Neal Petties - Football (1961–63)
• Craig Scoggins - Football (1965–66)
2007
• Bob Cluck - Baseball (1966–67)
• Mike Dodd - M. Basketball (1975–79), M. Volleyball (1978–80)
• John "Jake" Duich - Football (1935, 1937–38)
• Steve Duich - Football (1966–67)
• Jay Gutowski - Football (1953–56)
• Bobby Meacham - Baseball (1979–81)
• Rachel Scott - W. Water Polo (1995–98)
2008
• Isaac Curtis - Football (1972)
• John Farris - Football (1962–64)
• Kieishsha Garnes - W. Basketball (1991–92)
• Mark Grace - Baseball (1985)
• Bobby Howard - Football (1965–66)
2009
• 1966 Wire Service College Division Football National Champions
• Toni Himmer - W. Volleyball (1980–83)
• Oliver Maiberger - M. Tennis (2000–03)
• Mario Mendez - Football (1961–63)
• Jeff Staggs - Football (1965–66)
• Ralph Wenzel - Football (1964–65)
2010
• Tonette Dyer - W. Track & Field (2002–05)
• Kabeer Gbaja-Biamila - Football (1996–99)
• La'Roi Glover - Football (1992–95)
• Doug Harvey - Baseball (1955–56)
• John Hyden - M. Volleyball (1992–95)
• Fred Miller - Director of Athletics (1985–95)
2011
• Dick Barnes - M. Basketball (1946, 1948–50)
• Sandra Durazo - Softball (1998–2001)
• Kyle Turley - Football (1994–97)
• Quentin Wheeler - M. Track & Field (1975–76)
• 1958 NAIA Baseball National Champions (1958)
2012
• Dr. O. Kenneth Karr Jr. - Director of Athletics (1969–78)
• Randy Holcomb - M. Basketball (2001–02)
• Mike Malano - Football (1996–99)
• Liane Sato - W. Volleyball (1985–86)
• J. R. Tolver - Football (1999–2002)
2013
• Brandon Heath - M. Basketball (2003–07)
• Mark Reynolds - Sailing (1975–79)
• Choc Sportsman - Track & Field Coach (1947–66)
• Michelle Suman - W. Basketball (1991–95)
• Don Warren - Football (1976–79)
2014
• Kirk Morrison - Football (2000–04)
• Stephen Strasburg - Baseball (2007–09)
• Pete Inge - Football (1976–79)
• Kyle Whittemore - M. Soccer (1984–88)
• Shayla Balentine - W. Track & Field (2002–05)
2015
• Billy Blanton - Football (1994–96)
• Ed Imo - Football (1976–77)
• Larry Godfrey - M. Track & Field (1965)
• Karoline Koehler - W. Track & Field (2007–10)
• Anthony Watson - M. Basketball (1983–86)
2016
• Kawhi Leonard - M. Basketball (2009–11)
• Leon Parma - Football (1948–50)
• Noel Prefontaine - Football (1995–96)
• Miesha McKelvy-Jones - W. Track & Field (1997–99)
• Steve Williams - M. Track & Field (1973–74)
2017
• Steve Fisher - M. Basketball Coach (1999–2017)
• D.J. Gay - M. Basketball (2007–11)
• Whitney Ashley - W. Track & Field (2011–12)
• Craig Penrose - Football (1974–75)
• Whip Walton - Football (1974–77)
2018
• Jamaal Franklin - M. Basketball (2011–13)
• Holly Hartzell - W. Water Polo (2001–04)
• Lon Hinkle - M. Golf (1970–72)
• Travis Hitt - Football (1973–76)
• Larry Ned - Football (1998–2001)
• Ernie Anderson - Photographer
2019
• Jim Dietz - Baseball Coach (1972–2002)
• Tally Hall - M. Soccer (2003–06)
• Jené Morris - W. Basketball (2008–10)
• Xavier Thames - M. Basketball (2011–14)
• Shanieka Ricketts - W. Track & Field (2011–14)

== Notable athletes ==
See also the List of San Diego State University people

- Marcelo Balboa, World Cup and Major League Soccer (MLS) soccer star
- Bud Black, former Major League Baseball (MLB) pitcher and manager of the Colorado Rockies
- Jim Campbell, former MLB pitcher
- Joe Corona, current U.S. international soccer player
- Isaac Curtis, former National Football League (NFL) receiver
- Jeff DaVanon, former MLB player (Arizona Diamondbacks)
- Fred Dryer, actor-producer and former NFL player
- Herm Edwards, Arizona State University head coach
- Marshall Faulk, Pro Football Hall of Fame NFL running back and broadcaster
- John Fox, former Carolina Panthers, Chicago Bears, and Denver Broncos head coach
- Mark Grace, retired MLB player and World Series champion
- Tony Gwynn, Baseball Hall of Famer (and San Diego State baseball head coach at the time of his death in 2014)
- Kabeer Gbaja-Biamila, former NFL player with the Green Bay Packers
- Joe Gibbs, former NFL head coach of the Washington Redskins and current NASCAR team owner
- Az-Zahir Hakim, former NFL wide receiver
- Kameron Kelly, defensive back for the Pittsburgh Steelers
- Armen Keteyian, sports journalist, HBO Sports, Real Sports with Bryant Gumbel
- Travis Lee, former MLB player
- Kawhi Leonard, NBA Small Forward for the Los Angeles Clippers, 2014 and 2019 NBA Finals MVP, 2015 and 2016 NBA Defensive Player of the Year
- Art Linkletter, SDSU basketball player and swimmer who went on to a decades-long career as a radio and TV personality
- Chris Marlowe, Sportscaster, former Olympic volleyball player
- Kirk Morrison, former NFL linebacker with Buffalo Bills
- Haven Moses, former NFL receiver, 2x Pro Bowler
- Kassim Osgood, former NFL receiver
- Rashaad Penny, running back for the Philadelphia Eagles
- Noel Prefontaine, former Canadian Football League kicker
- Donnel Pumphrey, former NFL running back
- Jimmy Raye, former NFL player
- Darnay Scott, former Cincinnati Bengals wide receiver
- Don Shaw, former MLB pitcher
- Brian Sipe, former NFL quarterback
- Xander Schauffele, PGA Tour golfer
- Webster Slaughter, former American football wide receiver
- Dave Smith, former MLB pitcher
- Stephen Strasburg, MLB pitcher for the Washington Nationals
- Carl Weathers, actor/former NFL player most famous for playing Apollo Creed in the Rocky film series
- Eric Wynalda, former World Cup and MLS soccer star, former ABC Sports broadcaster, current head coach of Las Vegas Lights FC
- Jeanne Zelasko, sports journalist, Fox Sports
