= San Diego State Aztecs men's tennis =

College men's tennis team

- University: San Diego State University
- Head coach: Gene Carswell (since 2004 season)
- Conference: Pac-12
- Location: San Diego, California
- Home Court: Aztec Tennis Center
- Nickname: Aztecs
- Colors: Scarlet and black

NCAA Tournament appearances
- 1998, 1999, 2000, 2002, 2003, 2005, 2015

Conference Tournament championships
- Mountain West; 2002, 2003, 2005

Conference regular season champions
- Mountain West; 2002, 2003, 2005, 2006, 2007, 2013

The San Diego State Aztecs men's tennis team is the men's tennis program that represents San Diego State University (SDSU). The Aztecs compete in NCAA Division I as a member of the Pac-12 Conference. The team is based at the Aztec Tennis Center.

The Aztecs have won six regular season conference championships and three conference tournament championships as of 2020.

== Postseason ==
| Year | Round | Opponent | Result |
|---|---|---|---|
| 1998 | Region VII Regional | New Mexico | L 2–4 |
| 1999 | First Round; Second Round | Tulsa; UCLA | W 4–1; L 1–4 |
| 2000 | First Round; Second Round; Round of 16 | Washington; Pepperdine; VCU | W 4–3; W 4–2; L 3–4 |
| 2002 | First Round; Second Round | Hampton; UCLA | W 5–0; L 1–4 |
| 2003 | First Round; Second Round | San Diego; Washington | W 5–0; L 3–4 |
| 2005 | First Round | Cal | L 1–4 |
| 2015 | First Round; Second Round | San Diego; USC | W 4–3; L 0–4 |

== Head coaches ==
*since 1989

- Hugh Bream (1989–1993)
- John Nelson (1994–2003)
- Gene Carswell (2004–present)

== See also ==
- Aztec Hall of Fame
