= San Diego State Aztecs women's cross country =

College women's cross country team

- University: San Diego State University
- Head coach: Shelia Burrell (since 2009 season)
- Conference: Pac-12
- Location: San Diego, California
- Course: Morley Field
- Nickname: Aztecs
- Colors: Scarlet and black

NCAA Championship appearances
- 1981

The San Diego State Aztecs women's cross country team is the women's cross country program that represents San Diego State University (SDSU). The Aztecs compete in NCAA Division I as a member of the Pac-12 Conference.

== Postseason ==
The Aztec women's cross country team has thus far appeared in the NCAA Women's Division I Cross Country Championship one time, with that appearance resulting in 7th place in the 1981–82 school year.

Year	Finish	Points
1981	7th	169

== See also ==
- Aztec Hall of Fame
