= San Diego State Aztecs women's swimming & diving =

College women's swimming & diving team

- University: San Diego State University
- Head coach: Mike Schrader (since 2007–08 season)
- Conference: Pac-12
- Location: San Diego, California
- Home pool: Aztec Aquaplex
- Nickname: Aztecs
- Colors: Scarlet and black

The San Diego State Aztecs women's swimming and diving team is the women's swimming and diving program that represents San Diego State University (SDSU). The Aztecs compete in NCAA Division I as a member of the Pac-12 Conference. The team's home pool is located at the Aztec Aquaplex.

== Postseason ==
The Aztecs have reached the NCAA Division I Women's Swimming and Diving Championships 10 times since becoming a varsity program.

Year	Finish
1982	23rd
2010	42nd
2012	45th
2013	41st
2014	27th
2015	39th
2017	46th
2019	38th
2021	32nd
2022	37th

== See also ==
- Aztec Hall of Fame
