= Colorado State Rams women's volleyball =

American college volleyball team

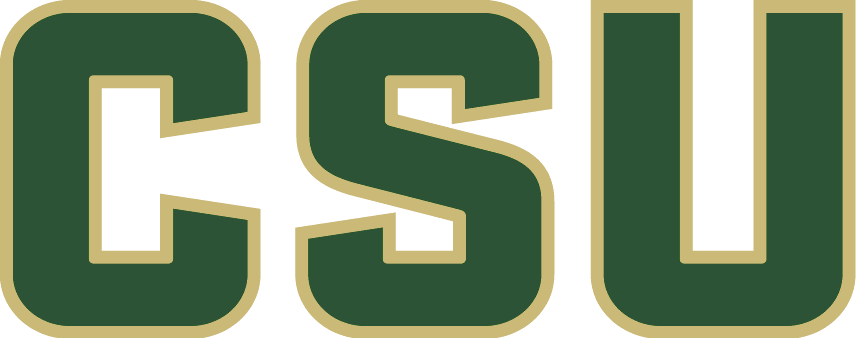
- University: Colorado State University
- Head coach: Emily Kohan (4th season)
- Conference: Pac-12
- Location: Fort Collins, Colorado, US
- Home arena: Moby Arena (capacity: 8,745)
- Nickname: Rams
- Colors: Green and gold

AIAW/NCAA tournament appearance
- 1983, 1984, 1985, 1986, 1987, 1988, 1995, 1996, 1997, 1998, 1999, 2000, 2001, 2002, 2003, 2004, 2005, 2006, 2007, 2008, 2009, 2010, 2011, 2012, 2013, 2014, 2015, 2016, 2017, 2018, 2019, 2024

Conference tournament champion
- 1999, 2003, 2004, 2006, 2011, 2024 (Note: The Mountain West tournament was not held between 2008 and 2010 or from 2012 to 2020. The HCAC and WAC did not have a tournament during Colorado State's membership in either conference.)

Conference regular season champion
- 1984, 1985, 1998, 2000, 2001, 2002, 2003, 2004, 2007, 2009, 2010, 2011, 2012, 2013, 2014, 2015, 2016, 2018, 2019, 2021, 2024

The Colorado State Rams women's volleyball team represents Colorado State University, located in Fort Collins, in the U.S. state of Colorado, in NCAA Division I volleyball competition. They play their home games at the Moby Arena and are members of the Pac-12 Conference.

== Conference affiliations ==
- High Country Athletic Conference, 1983–1989 (Note: The HCAC was an affiliate of the WAC for women's sports before the two conferences merged in 1990.)
- Western Athletic Conference, 1990–1998
- Mountain West Conference, 1999–2025
- Pac-12 Conference, 2026–future

== Head coaches ==
| Coach | G | W | L | T | WPCT | From | To |
|---|---|---|---|---|---|---|---|
| Sandy Caldwell | 37 | 10 | 27 | 0 | .270 | 1976 | 1977 |
| Merri Dwight | 153 | 64 | 85 | 4 | .431 | 1978 | 1982 |
| Rich Feller | 466 | 299 | 167 | 0 | .641 | 1983 | 1996 |
| Tom Hilbert | 801 | 637 | 164 | 0 | .795 | 1997 | 2022 |
| Emily Kohan | 92 | 60 | 32 | 0 | .652 | 2023 | Pres. |

Updated through 2025 season

== Year-by-year results ==
| Season | Coach | Record | | Regular season | Conference tournament | NCAA tournament |
|---|---|---|---|---|---|---|
| Season | Coach | Overall | Conference | Regular season | Conference tournament | NCAA tournament |
NCAA Division I Women's Mountain West
| 1999 | Tom Hilbert | 30–3 | 13–2 | 2nd | Champions | Sweet 16 |
| 2000 | Tom Hilbert | 32–5 | 13–1 | 1st | Runners-Up | Sweet 16 |
| 2001 | Tom Hilbert | 29–4 | 13–1 | 1st | Runners-Up | Sweet 16 |
| 2002 | Tom Hilbert | 22–10 | 12–2 | 1st | Semi-Finalists | 1st Round |
| 2003 | Tom Hilbert | 30–5 | 14–0 | 1st | Champions | Sweet 16 |
| 2004 | Tom Hilbert | 26–4 | 13–1 | T-1st | Champions | 1st Round |
| 2005 | Tom Hilbert | 21–9 | 12–4 | 2nd | Semi-Finalists | 2nd Round |
| 2006 | Tom Hilbert | 20–10 | 11–5 | 3rd | Champions | 1st Round |
| 2007 | Tom Hilbert | 23–8 | 13–3 | 1st | Semi-Finalists | 2nd Round |
| 2008 | Tom Hilbert | 23–7 | 12–4 | 2nd | | 2nd Round |
| 2009 | Tom Hilbert | 25–6 | 15–1 | 1st | | Sweet 16 |
| 2010 | Tom Hilbert | 26–5 | 14–2 | 1st | | 2nd Round |
| 2011 | Tom Hilbert | 25–6 | 12–2 | 1st | Champions | 2nd Round |
| 2012 | Tom Hilbert | 21–8 | 13–3 | T-1st | | 1st Round |
| 2013 | Tom Hilbert | 28–2 | 19–1 | 1st | | 1st Round |
| 2014 | Tom Hilbert | 31–3 | 17–1 | 1st | | Sweet 16 |
| 2015 | Tom Hilbert | 26–4 | 18–0 | 1st | | 1st Round |
| 2016 | Tom Hilbert | 21–9 | 15–3 | 2nd | | 1st Round |
| 2017 | Tom Hilbert | 29–4 | 17–1 | 1st | | 2nd Round |
| 2018 | Tom Hilbert | 23–8 | 15–3 | 1st | | 1st Round |
| 2019 | Tom Hilbert | 29–2 | 18–0 | 1st | | 1st Round |
| 2020 | Tom Hilbert | 9–6 | 9–6 | 3rd | | |
| 2021 | Tom Hilbert | 18–10 | 14–4 | T-1st | Semi-Finalists | |
| 2022 | Tom Hilbert | 19–11 | 12–6 | 3rd | 1st Round | |
| 2023 | Emily Kohan | 19–12 | 12–6 | 2nd | Runners-Up | |
| 2024 | Emily Kohan | 20–11 | 14–4 | 1st | Champions | 1st Round |
| 2025 | Emily Kohan | 21–9 | 15–5 | 2nd | Runners-Up | |

Updated through 2025 season

== AVCA All-Americans ==
First Team:

- Diane Saba (1987)
- Angela Knopf (2000, 2001)

Second Team:

- Sherri Danielson (1984, 1985)
- Angie Knox (1987)
- Catie Vagneur (1999)
- Courtney Cox (2000)
- Soraya Santos (2001)

Third Team:

- Mekana Barnes (2007)
- Katelyn Steffan (2011)
- Megan Plourde (2011)
- Dana Cranston (2012)
- Deedra Foss (2014)
- Adrianna Culbert (2015)

Updated through 2024 season

== Conference awards ==
Mountain West Coach of the Year:

- Tom Hilbert (1999–2003, 2007, 2009, 2011, 2013, 2017–2019)
- Emily Kohan (2024)

Mountain West Player of the Year:

- Angela Knopf (2000, 2001)
- Melissa Courtney (2003, 2004)
- Mekana Barnes (2007)
- Danielle Minch (2009, 2010)
- Katelyn Steffan (2011)
- Dana Cranston (2012)
- Samantha Peters (2013)
- Deedra Foss (2014)
- Adrianna Culbert (2015)
- Katie Oleksak (2017–2019)
- Malaya Jones (2024)

Mountain West Newcomer of the Year:

- Deedra Foss (2011)
- Alex Reid (2015)
- Kirstie Hillyer (2016)
- Breana Runnels (2017)
- Annie Sullivan (2021)
- Emery Herman (2023)

Mountain West Freshman of the Year:

- Tess Rogers (2002)
- Katie Oleksak (2016)

Mountain West Setter of the Year:

- Allison Peckman (1999–2001)
- Melissa Courtney (2003, 2004)
- Ashley Fornstorm (2007, 2008)
- Deedra Foss (2013, 2014)

Mountain West Defensive Specialist of the Year:

- Kristen Vance (1999)
- Lindsey Kerr (2002)
- Katelin Batten (2009)

WAC Coach of the Year:

- Tom Hilbert (1998)

WAC Freshman of the Year:

- Catie Vagneur (1996)
- Angela Knopf (1998)

WAC Defensive Specialist of the Year:

- Kristen Vance (1998)

HCAC Player of the Year:

- Sherri Danielson (1984, 1985)

HCAC Offensive Player of the Year:

- Diane Saba (1987)

Updated through 2025 season

== Current roster ==
2024 Colorado State Rams women's volleyball
| # | Pos. | Name | Class | Ht | Prev. School | Hometown |
| 1 | MB | Malaya Jones | R-JR | 6'0" | Santa Margarita HS | Santa Ana, CA |
| 3 | OH | Brooke Holman | FR | 6'1" | Littleton High School | Aspen, CO |
| 4 | S | Emery Herman | SR | 6'0" | Georgetown HS; Arizona | Georgetown, TX |
| 6 | L/DS | Aine Doty | JR | 5'7" | Doherty High School Idaho | Colorado Springs, CO |
| 7 | MB | Jessica Lawton | FR | 6'3" | Whitnall High School | Hales Corners, Wisconsin |
| 8 | OH | Taylor Pagan | SO | 6'1" | Mater Lakes | Pembroke Pines, FL |
| 9 | MB | Naeemah Weathers | GR | 6'1" | Palmer Ridge HS | Colorado Springs, CO |
| 11 | DS | Jordyn Tynsky | FR | 5'8" | John H. Guyer High School | Denton, Texas |
| 13 | MB | Jazen DeBina | R-SO | 6'0" | Liberty HS | Las Vegas, NV |
| 17 | OH | Kennedy Stanford | GR | 5'10" | Lamar HS | Grand Prairie, TX |
| 18 | DS | Kate Yoshimoto | R-JR | 5'2" | Punahou | Honolulu, HI |
| 22 | DS | Delaney McIntosh | R-SO | 5'10" | Verona Area HS | Madison, WI |
| 23 | S | Erin Debiec | FR | 6'1" | Bishop O'Connell High School | Potomac, Maryland |
| 26 | OH | Maria Brun | FR | 6'1" | CV Sant Cugat Club | Barcelona |
| 33 | MB | Kekua Richards | R-FR | 6'7" | Seabury Hall | Pā'ia, HI |
| 42 | MB | Karina Leber | GR | 6'3" | Wilmot Union HS | Trevor, WI |

Coaches:

- Emily Kohan (head coach)
- Sonja Anderson (assistant coach)
- Ted Kopacz (assistant Coach)
- Bri Olmstead (director of volleyball operations)
