= San Diego State Aztecs women's lacrosse =

College women's lacrosse team

- Founded: 2012
- University: San Diego State University
- Head coach: Kylee White (since 2012 season)
- Stadium: Aztec Lacrosse Field
- Location: San Diego, California
- Conference: Big 12
- Nickname: Aztecs
- Colors: Scarlet and black

Conference Tournament championships
- MPSF; 2018, 2019

The San Diego State Aztecs women's lacrosse team is the women's lacrosse program that represents San Diego State University (SDSU). The Aztecs compete in NCAA Division I as an affiliate member of the Big 12 Conference. The team plays its home games at the Aztec Lacrosse Field.

The Aztecs had played in the Pac-12 Conference in the 2024 season, but with the impending collapse of the Pac-12 as a backdrop, the team announced plans to join the Big 12 as an affiliate member for women's lacrosse on February 21, 2024.

== All-time season results ==
Legend
Conference champions
Conference Tournament Champions

Season	Record		Conference Standing	Conference Tournament
Season	Conference	Overall	Conference Standing	Conference Tournament
Mountain Pacific Sports Federation
2012	2-5	5-10	T-5th	
2013	3-5	8-8	T-5th	
2014	4-5	7-10	6th	Quarterfinals
2015	5-4	9-8	T-4th	Quarterfinals
2016	3-6	4-11	7th	
2017	3-5	10-8	T-5th	Semifinals
2018	1-1	11-8	2nd	Champions
2019	1-1	11-7	2nd	Champions
2020	0-0	3-2	N/A	Canceled due to COVID-19
2021	1-1	5-9	2nd	Semifinals
Independent
2022	N/A	7-8	N/A	N/A
2023	N/A	6-10	N/A	N/A
Pac-12 Conference
2024	1–6	2–14	8th	N/A
2025	0–0	4–0		N/A

== Head coaches ==
Name	Years	Won	Lost	Pct.
Kylee White	2012–Present	92	113	.449
