= 1981 NCAA Division I cross country championships =

1981 cross-country running meet of the NCAA (Division I)

1981 NCAA Division I Cross Country Championships
- Organisers: NCAA
- Edition: 43rd (Men); 1st (Women)
- Date: November 23, 1981
- Host city: Park City, KS; Wichita State University
- Venue: Echo Hills Golf Course
- Distances: 10 km–Men; 5 km–Women
- Participation: 191–Men; 113–Women athletes

The 1981 NCAA Division I Cross Country Championships were the 43rd annual NCAA Men's Division I Cross Country Championship and the 1st annual NCAA Women's Division I Cross Country Championship to determine the team and individual national champions of NCAA Division I men's and women's collegiate cross country running in the United States. For the first time, a women's national championship was held alongside the men's meet. In all, four different titles were contested: men's and women's individual and team championships.

Held on November 23, 1981, the combined meet was hosted for the second consecutive year by Wichita State University at the Echo Hills Golf Course in Park City, Kansas. The distance for the men's race was 10 kilometers (6.21 miles) while the distance for the women's race was 5 kilometers (3.11 miles).

The men's team national championship was retained again by the UTEP Miners, their seventh, and fourth consecutive, overall title. The individual championship was won by South African runner Matthews Motshwarateu, also from UTEP, with a time of 28:45.80. By placing all of their top 5 in the top 8 finishers, UTEP's score remains the best team score in event history.

The UTEP team, composed of African recruits, was a dominant group of talent, but coach Ted Banks, who had assembled the team was criticized for his recruiting practices and scholarship promises. Within a year, he had resigned his position as coach.

The inaugural women's team national championship was won by the Virginia Cavaliers, their first. The individual championship was won by Betty Springs, from NC State, with a time of 16:19.00. Given that this was the first edition of this race, Springs' time set the event's distance record.

== Qualification ==
- All Division I cross country teams were eligible to qualify for the meet through their placement at various regional qualifying meets. In total, 23 teams and 191 runners contested the men's championship while 13 teams and 113 runners contested the women's title.

== Men's title ==
- Distance: 10,000 meters (6.21 miles)

=== Men's Team Result (Top 10) ===
Rank	Team	Points
1st place, gold medalist(s)	UTEP	17
2nd place, silver medalist(s)	Providence	109
3rd place, bronze medalist(s)	Arkansas	175
4	Wisconsin	179
5	UCLA	189
6	East Tennessee State	223
7	Arizona	254
8	Florida State	257
9	Clemson	301
10	Illinois	307

=== Men's Individual Result (Top 10) ===
Rank	Name	Nationality	Time
1st place, gold medalist(s)	(South Africa) Matthews Motshwarateu	UTEP	28:45.80
2nd place, silver medalist(s)	(Kenya) Michael Musyoki	UTEP	28:48.40
3rd place, bronze medalist(s)	(Kenya) Gabriel Kaman	UTEP	29:19.30
4	(United Kingdom) Mark Scrutton	Colorado	29:22.10
5	(United Kingdom) Graeme Fell	San Diego State	29:30.40
6	(United States) Alan Scharsu	Penn State	29:30.50
7	(Tanzania) Suleiman Nyambui	UTEP	29:32.60
8	(Tanzania) Gidamis Shahanga	UTEP	29:33.60
9	(United States) David Taylor	Arkansas	29:35.60
10	(Kenya) Richard Twuei	Washington State	29:36.70

== Women's title ==
- Distance: 5,000 meters (3.11 miles)

=== Women's Team Result (Top 10) ===
Rank	Team	Points
1st place, gold medalist(s)	Virginia	36
2nd place, silver medalist(s)	Oregon	83
3rd place, bronze medalist(s)	Stanford	105
4	Michigan State	122
5	NC State	123
6	Clemson	152
7	San Diego State	169
8	Arizona	182
9	Missouri	234
10	Penn State	249

=== Women's Individual Result (Top 10) ===
Rank	Name	Nationality	Time
1st place, gold medalist(s)	(United States) Betty Springs	NC State	16:19.00
2nd place, silver medalist(s)	(United States) LeAnn Warren	Oregon	16:25.30
3rd place, bronze medalist(s)	(United States) Aileen O'Connor	Virginia	16:27.70
4	(United States) Kelly Cathey	Oklahoma	16:27.90
5	(United States) Lesley Welsh	Virginia	16:27.90
6	(United States) Joan Hansen	Arizona	16:29.60
7	(United States) Bernadette Madigan	Kentucky	16:35.30
8	(United States) Lisa Welsh	Virginia	16:38.20
9	(United States) Kathy Bryant	Tennessee	16:41.50
10	(United States) Cecelia Hopp	Stanford	16:46.00

== See also ==
- NCAA Men's Division II Cross Country Championship
- NCAA Women's Division II Cross Country Championship (began 1981)
- NCAA Men's Division III Cross Country Championship
- NCAA Women's Division III Cross Country Championship (began 1981)
