= San Diego State Aztecs women's water polo =

College women's water polo team

- Founded: 1995
- University: San Diego State University
- Head coach: Carin Crawford (since 1999 season)
- Conference: GCC
- Location: San Diego, California
- Home pool: Aztec Aquaplex
- Nickname: Aztecs
- Colors: Scarlet and black

NCAA Tournament Appearances
- 2007, 2008, 2016

Conference Champions
- GCC; 2016

The San Diego State Aztecs women's water polo team is the women's water polo program that represents San Diego State University (SDSU). The Aztecs compete in NCAA Division I as an affiliate member of the Golden Coast Conference (GCC). The team's home pool is located at the Aztec Aquaplex.

The team became a varsity program in 1995, competing without a conference for its first season before joining the Mountain Pacific Sports Federation (MPSF) for the following season. The Aztecs are a founding member of the Golden Coast Conference, which had its first season in 2014.

== All-time season results ==
Season	Head coach	Record		National ranking (postseason)	Postseason
Season	Head coach	Conference	Overall	National ranking (postseason)	Postseason
1995	Deena Schmidt	N/A	24–8	#2	
Mountain Pacific Sports Federation
1996	Deena Schmidt	4–2	27–8	#3	
1997	Deena Schmidt	4–2	17–12	#3	
1998	Deena Schmidt	5–4	23–14	#7	
1999	Carin Crawford	3–6	23–19	#5	
2000	Carin Crawford	4–5	18–16	#6	
2001	Carin Crawford	4–6	23–16	#7	
2002	Carin Crawford	5–6	20–15	#8	
2003	Carin Crawford	4–6	21–12	#6	
2004	Carin Crawford	8–3	26–9	#7	
2005	Carin Crawford	3–9	16–18	#11	
2006	Carin Crawford	5–7	22–12	#7	
2007	Carin Crawford	8–4	29–10	#5	NCAA championship semifinals (4th place)
2008	Carin Crawford	8–4	31–7	#7	NCAA championship (5th place)
2009	Carin Crawford	1–6	23–11	#8	
2010	Carin Crawford	1–6	21–15	#9	
2011	Carin Crawford	1–6	20–15	#11	
2012	Carin Crawford	1–6	22–11	#8	
Big West Conference
2013	Carin Crawford	5–2	23–11	#10	
Golden Coast Conference
2014	Carin Crawford	6–0	23–12	#17	
2015	Carin Crawford	6–0	17–15	#16	
2016	Carin Crawford	7–0	18–19	#14	NCAA championship (8th place)
2017	Carin Crawford	7–0	18–14	#13	
2018	Carin Crawford	5–2	15–16	#20	
2019	Carin Crawford	5–2	16–16	#18	

== See also ==
- Aztec Hall of Fame
