= San Diego State Aztecs women's golf =

College golf team

- University: San Diego State University
- Conference: Pac-12
- Head coach: Lauren Dobashi (since 2021–22 season)
- Location: San Diego, California
- Nickname: Aztecs
- Colors: Scarlet and black

Conference champions
- Mountain West; 2015, 2019

The San Diego State Aztecs women's golf team is the women's golf program that represents San Diego State University (SDSU). The Aztecs compete in NCAA Division I as a member of the Pac-12 Conference.

The team has been coached by Lauren Dobashi since the 2021–22 season. Former LPGA Tour golfer Leslie Spalding previously coached the team for ten years from the 2011–12 season through the 2020–21 season before retiring in May 2021.

== See also ==
- Aztec Hall of Fame
