= 1948 Harbor Bowl =

Hardin–Simmons Cowboys	San Diego State Aztecs
(7–3)	(7–3–1)
53	0
Head coach: Warren B. Woodson	Head coach: Bill Schulte
	1	2	3	4	Total
Hardin–Simmons	14	13	14	12	53
San Diego State	0	0	0	0	0
- Date: January 1, 1948
- Season: 1947
- Stadium: Balboa Stadium
- Location: San Diego, California

The 1948 Harbor Bowl was an American college football bowl game played on January 1, 1948, at Balboa Stadium in San Diego, California. The game pitted the San Diego State Aztecs and the Hardin–Simmons Cowboys. This was the second edition of the Harbor Bowl.

== Background ==
The Cowboys won games over Trinity (TX), Arizona, New Mexico, Houston, West Texas A&M, Texas Western and Arizona State, while losing games to San Jose State, Mississippi State, and Texas Tech. This was their fifth bowl game in 12 years. This was the first ever bowl game for the Aztecs, who went 2–2–1 in the California Collegiate Athletic Association.

== Game summary ==
In a game played in their own city (and where they used to play in until 1935), the Aztecs were flat out dominated, with the Cowboys having 545 yards on offense, as opposed to San Diego State's 126. Hardin–Simmons had 470 of those on the ground, while the Aztecs had a mere 66 on the ground. Passing was no better, as they went 5-of-20 for 60 yards and an interception (the Cowboys had 3-of-5 for 75 yards). Incidentally, they both had 11 first downs.

== Aftermath ==
The Aztecs did not appear in a bowl game again until the Pasadena Bowl in 1969. The Cowboys appeared in three bowl games in 1948.
