= 2020 NCAA Division I Indoor Track and Field Championships =

College track and field competition

- Dates: March 13–14, 2020 (event cancelled, not held)
- Host city: Albuquerque, New Mexico
- Venue: Albuquerque Convention Center
- Events: 34

The 2020 NCAA Division I Indoor Track and Field Championships was to be the 56th NCAA Men's Division I Indoor Track and Field Championships and the 39th NCAA Women's Division I Indoor Track and Field Championships, held at the Albuquerque Convention Center. In total, thirty-four different men's and women's indoor track and field events were to be contested from March 13 to March 14, 2020. The event (along with all winter championships and spring sports) was cancelled by the NCAA on March 12, 2020 due to the COVID-19 pandemic; the attendance before was to be limited only to coaches, participants and personnel.

== Television Coverage ==
ESPN3 and NCAA.org were to telecast the event.

== See also ==
- NCAA Men's Division I Indoor Track and Field Championships
- NCAA Women's Division I Indoor Track and Field Championships
