= Aztec Aquaplex =

Aquatic complex in San Diego, California

Coordinates: 32.773654°N 117.079861°W

- Interactive map of Aztec Aquaplex
- Location: San Diego, California
- Owner: San Diego State University
- Operator: San Diego State University; Associated Students of SDSU

Construction
- Groundbreaking: 2005
- Opened: 2007
- Cost: $12 million USD by PCL Construction
- Architects: Austin, Veum & Robbins Partners

Tenant
- San Diego State Aztecs (2007–present)

The Aztec Aquaplex is an aquatic complex in San Diego, California, located on the campus of San Diego State University (SDSU). Opened in 2007, the complex comprises two large outdoor pools, a spa and locker rooms. It is the home of the San Diego State Aztecs women's swimming & diving and women's water polo teams. The Aztecs compete in NCAA Division I as a member of the Pac-12 Conference (Pac-12) for swimming & diving and the Golden Coast Conference (GCC) for water polo.

== Facilities ==
Constructed on the west side of campus, the site occupies a total of 125,000 square feet (11,600 m^{2}) of usable space. The facility is situated between Tony Gwynn Stadium, SDSU Softball Stadium, Aztec Tennis Center, three football practice fields and the SDSU Sports Deck.

=== Swimming pools ===
The facility hosts three swimming pools:

Description	Size
Olympic-size pool	50 meter
Recreational pool	7,500 square feet (700 m^{2})
Hydrotherapy spa	20 person

=== Services ===
Adjacent to the pools is a building complex with showers, locker rooms, restrooms, administrative offices, member services, storage, and support facilities.
