= 2001 NCAA Division I women's volleyball tournament =

Volleyball competition

2001 NCAA women's Division I volleyball tournament
- 2001 NCAA Final Four logo
- Champions: Stanford (5th title)
- Runner-up: Long Beach State (5th NCAA (9th national) title match)
- Semifinalists: Arizona (1st Final Four); Nebraska (8th Final Four)
- Winning coach: John Dunning (3rd title)
- Most outstanding player: Logan Tom (Stanford)
- Final Four All-Tournament Team: Ogonna Nnamani (Stanford); Ashley Ivy (Stanford); Robyn Lewis (Stanford); Tayyiba Haneef (Long Beach St.); Brittany Hochevar (Long Beach St.)

The 2001 NCAA Division I women's volleyball tournament began on November 29, 2001, with 64 teams and ended December 15 when Stanford defeated Long Beach State 3 games to 0 in San Diego, California for the program's fifth NCAA title.

Led by future Olympians Logan Tom and Ogonna Nnamani, Stanford stunned previously unbeaten Long Beach State in the title match. Long Beach State was attempting to become the first program to go undefeated in more than one season, as they went 36-0 just 3 years before in 1998.

On their way to the title, Stanford was able to knock off defending champion Nebraska in the national semifinals. The other semifinal participant, Arizona, made the program's first NCAA Final Four appearance.

The win gave Stanford head coach John Dunning, who was in his first year as Stanford's head coach, his third NCAA title as he won two with Pacific in the 1980s.

This was the first year of rally point scoring in the NCAA Division I tournament, with games going to 30 points to win. Previous years used the side out scoring (SOS), with 15 points needed to win. Games became "sets" in 2008 and were reduced to 25 points to win.

== Records ==
Long Beach Regional
Seed	School	Conference	Berth Type	Record
	DePaul	Conference USA	Automatic	24-8
	Eastern Washington	Big Sky	Automatic	20-5
	Fairfield	MAAC	Automatic	19-12
9	Hawaii	WAC	Automatic	26-5
1	Long Beach State	Big West	Automatic	28-0
	Minnesota	Big Ten	At-large	17-12
	Northern Illinois	MAC	Automatic	24-5
16	Northern Iowa	Missouri Valley	Automatic	28-1
	Oregon State	Pac-10	At-large	17-11
	Penn	Ivy League	Automatic	18-4
	Penn State	Big Ten	At-large	21-7
	San Diego	West Coast	At-large	21-8
	San Diego State	Mountain West	At-large	16-12
	UC Santa Barbara	Big West	At-large	17-13
8	UCLA	Pac-10	At-large	18-8
	Washington State	Pac-10	At-large	17-11

Stanford Regional
Seed	School	Conference	Berth Type	Record
	BYU	Mountain West	At-large	20-8
	Michigan State	Big Ten	At-large	20-7
	Milwaukee	Horizon	Automatic	20-7
	Nevada	WAC	At-large	17-7
	Northeastern	America East	Automatic	23-10
	Notre Dame	Big East	Automatic	22-6
	San Jose State	WAC	At-large	24-7
	Santa Clara	West Coast	At-large	19-9
3	Stanford	Pac-10	Automatic	27-2
	Texas	Big 12	At-large	16-12
11	Texas A&M	Big 12	At-large	23-5
	Texas Tech	Big 12	At-large	18-13
	Texas-Arlington	Southland	Automatic	24-11
14	Utah	Mountain West	Automatic	23-6
	Utah State	Big West	At-large	18-11
6	Wisconsin	Big Ten	Automatic	25-3

Los Angeles Regional
Seed	School	Conference	Berth Type	Record
	Alabama A&M	SWAC	Automatic	20-8
5	Arizona	Pac-10	At-large	21-4
	Cincinnati	Conference USA	At-large	22-7
	Duke	ACC	At-large	22-4
	Eastern Illinois	Ohio Valley	Automatic	20-8
	Georgia Tech	ACC	At-large	19-7
	Illinois	Big Ten	At-large	20-8
	Liberty	Big South	Automatic	21-10
	Louisville	Conference USA	At-large	25-6
	Missouri	Big 12	At-large	20-10
13	Ohio State	Big Ten	At-large	25-3
12	Pacific	Big West	At-large	26-7
	Robert Morris	Northeast	Automatic	29-5
4	USC	Pac-10	At-large	22-3
	William & Mary	CAA	Automatic	21-5
	Xavier	Atlantic 10	Automatic	25-5

Lincoln Regional
Seed	School	Conference	Berth Type	Record
	American	Patriot	Automatic	26-3
	Arkansas	SEC	At-large	21-11
	Baylor	Big 12	At-large	18-11
	Colorado	Big 12	At-large	18-10
15	Colorado State	Mountain West	At-large	27-3
	FIU	Sun Belt	Automatic	22-7
10	Florida	SEC	Automatic	25-1
	Florida A&M	MEAC	Automatic	27-2
	Georgia Southern	Southern	Automatic	22-11
	Kansas State	Big 12	At-large	19-7
2	Nebraska	Big 12	Automatic	27-1
	North Carolina	ACC	Automatic	23-8
	Oral Roberts	Mid-Continent	Automatic	19-6
7	Pepperdine	West Coast	Automatic	21-3
	South Carolina	SEC	At-large	20-5
	UCF	Atlantic Sun	Automatic	19-6

== Long Beach Regional ==
First round November 29–30
1	Long Beach State	3
San Diego State	0
Long Beach, CA
UCSB	2
San Diego	3
DePaul	0
Minnesota	3
Cedar Falls, IA
Northern Illinois	0
16	Northern Iowa	3
9	Hawaiʻi	3
Washington State	0
Pullman, WA
Eastern Washington	3
Oregon State	2
Penn State	3
Fairfield	0
University Park, PA
Pennsylvania	0
8	UCLA	3

Second round December 1–2
1	Long Beach State	3
San Diego	0
Minnesota	2
16	Northern Iowa	3
9	Hawaiʻi	3
Eastern Washington	1
Penn State	0
8	UCLA	3

Regional semifinals December 6–7
1	Long Beach State	3
16	Northern Iowa	0
9	Hawaiʻi	1
8	UCLA	3

Regional finals December 8–9
1	Long Beach State	3
8	UCLA	0

== Los Angeles Regional ==
First round November 29–30
5	Arizona	3
Eastern Illinois	0
Champaign, IL
Missouri	1
Illinois	3
Louisville	3
Georgia Tech	2
Louisville, KY
Alabama A&M	0
12	Pacific	3
13	Ohio State	3
Robert Morris	0
Columbus, OH
Cincinnati	3
Xavier	1
Duke	3
William & Mary	0
Los Angeles
Liberty	0
4	Southern California	3

Second round December 1–2
5	Arizona	3
Illinois	1
Louisville	1
12	Pacific	3
13	Ohio State	3
Cincinnati	1
Duke	0
4	Southern California	3

Regional semifinals December 6–7
5	Arizona	3
12	Pacific	0
13	Ohio State	0
4	Southern California	3

Regional finals December 8–9
5	Arizona	3
4	Southern California	2

== Stanford Regional ==
First round November 29–30
3	Stanford	3
Nevada	0
Stanford, CA
San Jose State	3
Santa Clara	2
Utah State	3
BYU	2
Salt Lake City, UT
Texas Tech	0
14	Utah	3
11	Texas A&M	3
UT Arlington	0
College Station, TX
Northeastern	0
Texas	3
Notre Dame	1
Michigan State	3
Madison, WI
UW–Milwaukee	0
6	Wisconsin	3

Second round December 1–2
3	Stanford	3
San Jose State	0
Utah State	1
14	Utah	3
11	Texas A&M	3
Texas	0
Michigan State	0
6	Wisconsin	3

Regional semifinals December 6–7
3	Stanford	3
14	Utah	1
11	Texas A&M	3
6	Wisconsin	0

Regional finals December 8–9
3	Stanford	3
11	Texas A&M	0

== Lincoln Regional ==
First round November 29–30
7	Pepperdine	3
Georgia Southern	0
Chapel Hill, NC
North Carolina	3
South Carolina	1
Florida International	3
Central Florida	0
Gainesville, FL
Florida A&M	0
10	Florida	3
15	Colorado State	3
Baylor	1
Fort Collins, CO
Colorado	3
American	0
Kansas State	3
Arkansas	2
Manhattan, KS
Oral Roberts	0
2	Nebraska	3

Second round December 1–2
7	Pepperdine	3
North Carolina	0
Florida International	0
10	Florida	3
15	Colorado State	3
Colorado	2
Kansas State	1
2	Nebraska	3

Regional semifinals December 6–7
7	Pepperdine	0
10	Florida	3
15	Colorado State	1
2	Nebraska	3

Regional finals December 8–9
10	Florida	2
2	Nebraska	3

== Final Four – Cox Arena, San Diego, CA ==
National Semifinals; December 13
1	Long Beach State	3
5	Arizona	0
3	Stanford	3
2	Nebraska	0

National Championship; December 15
1	Long Beach State	0
3	Stanford	3

== National Semifinals ==
=== Long Beach State vs. Arizona ===
Teams	Game 1	Game 2	Game 3
LBSU	30	30	30
ARIZ	27	25	20

Top ranked and undefeated Long Beach State easily defeated Arizona in three sets. Tayyiba Haneef led Long Beach with 21 kills. Long Beach out-hit Arizona .384 to .216, out-blocked the Wildcats 10 to 8 and had 8 service aces while Arizona had just 3. Arizona was led by Shannon Torregrosas's 14 kills. Arizona ended their season at 25–5 with the program's first ever Final Four appearance. Long Beach upped their record to 33–0.

=== Stanford vs Nebraska ===
Teams	Game 1	Game 2	Game 3
STAN	31	30	30
NEB	29	28	21

Led by Logan Tom's 22 kills, Stanford knocked off defending national champion Nebraska in three sets. Ogonna Nnamani added 13 kills to help the Cardinal sweep. Stanford out-blocked Nebraska, 12 to 9, and hit .270 as a team while Nebraska hit just .186. Nancy Metcalf led Nebraska with 14 kills as Nebraska ended their season at 31–2. Stanford advanced to the program's ninth NCAA title match.

== National Championship: Long Beach State vs. Stanford ==
Teams	Game 1	Game 2	Game 3
LBSU	29	28	25
STAN	31	30	30

In the title match, Stanford stunned top ranked and previously undefeated Long Beach State in three sets.

In game 1, Stanford went up 20–14 before Long Beach State closed the gap to 23–22. Down 26–24, Long Beach State rallied off four straight points, and eventually earned game point at 29–27. The 49'ers squandered both opportunities, with a Logan Tom kill and a Long Beach hitting error tying it up at 29. A Tom kill gave Stanford the game, 31–29. It was the first time all season that Long Beach lost the first game of a match.

In game 2, Stanford went up 11–7, then extended the lead to 20–13. Stanford remained in control, going up 27-20 and earning game point at 29–23. Long Beach State, however, did not go away and reeled off five consecutive points to cut the deficit to 29–28. The comeback ended, however, on a 49er service error giving Stanford the game, 30–28.

Game 3 remained even midway through. Stanford led 15–14 at the media timeout, before a Logan Tom service ace gave the Cardinal some separation at 25–21. Stanford remained ahead, going up 28–24 after an Ogonna Nnamani kill, before earning championship point after a Tom kill. A Stanford block ended the match, 30–25, ending Long Beach State's undefeated season, while Stanford ended their season at 33-2 - with one of the losses coming from Long Beach State earlier in the year.

Stanford won their fifth NCAA title. The win over Long Beach improved Stanford's record to 2–0 against undefeated teams in the national championship, as Stanford beat previously undefeated UCLA in the 1992 final. Stanford head coach John Dunning became the first Division I coach to win the national championship at two different schools, as he led Pacific to back-to-back titles in 1985 and 1986.
