= 2012 NCAA Division I Women's Swimming and Diving Championships =

American college aquatic sports competition

- Host city: Auburn, Alabama
- Date: March 15–17, 2012
- Venue: James E. Martin Aquatics Center

The 2012 NCAA Women's Division I Swimming and Diving Championships were contested at the 31st annual NCAA-sanctioned swim meet to determine the team and individual national champions of Division I women's collegiate swimming and diving in the United States.

This year's events were hosted by Auburn University at the James E. Martin Aquatics Center in Auburn, Alabama.

Defending champions California again topped the team standings, finishing 46.5 points (412.5–366) ahead of Georgia. This was the Golden Bears' third women's team title.

== Team standings ==
- Note: Top 10 only
- (H) = Hosts
- ^{(DC)} = Defending champions
- Full results

Rank	Team	Points
1st place, gold medalist(s)	California ^{(DC)}	412 1/2
2nd place, silver medalist(s)	Georgia	366
3rd place, bronze medalist(s)	USC	325 1/2
4	Stanford	318
5	Arizona	299
6	Texas A&M	262
7	Auburn (H); Tennessee	249
9	Texas	201
10	Florida	160

== Swimming results ==
Event	Gold		Silver		Bronze	
50 freestyle	Liv Jensen; California	21.48	Margo Geer; Arizona	21.64	Arianna Vanderpool-Wallace; Auburn	21.65
100 freestyle	Arianna Vanderpool-Wallace; Auburn	46.88	Megan Romano; Georgia	47.01	Margo Geer; Arizona	47.14
200 freestyle	Megan Romano; Georgia	1:41.21; US, AR	Karlee Bispo; Texas	1:42.78	Liv Jensen; California	1:43.45
500 freestyle	Haley Anderson; USC	4:34.48	Amber McDermott; Georgia	4:35.09	Stephanie Peacock; North Carolina	4:35.95
1650 freestyle	Stephanie Peacock; North Carolina	15:38.79	Wendy Trott; Georgia	15:38.94	Haley Anderson; USC	15:43.44
100 backstroke	Cindy Tran; California	50.31	Megan Romano; Georgia	51.37	Jennifer Connolly; Tennessee	51.58
200 backstroke	Elizabeth Beisel; Florida	1:50.58	Maya DiRado; Stanford	1:51.42	Dominique Bouchard; Missouri	1:51.68
100 breaststroke	Breeja Larson; Texas A&M	57.71; US, AR	Ashley Danner; George Mason	59.02	Rebecca Ejdervik; Arizona State	59.18
200 breaststroke	Caitlin Leverenz; California	2:04.76	Haley Spencer; Minnesota	2:07.24	Breeja Larson; Texas A&M	2:07.44
100 butterfly	Sara Isakovic; California	51.49	Olivia Scott; Auburn	51.61	Kelsey Floyd; Tennessee	51.67
200 butterfly	Katinka Hosszú; USC	1:51.32	Cammile Adams; Texas A&M	1:52.40	Kelsey Floyd; Tennessee	1:54.28
200 IM	Caitlin Leverenz; California	1:51.77; US, AR	Katinka Hosszú; USC	1:51.80	Maya DiRado; Stanford	1:53.89
400 IM	Katinka Hosszú; USC	3:56.54; US	Caitlin Leverenz; California	3:57.89; AR	Elizabeth Beisel; Florida	3:59.37
200 freestyle relay	Stanford; Samantha Woodward (22.07); Madeline Schaefer (21.80); Andrea Murez (21.79); Elizabeth Webb (21.19)	1:26.85	California; Kaylin Bing (22.25); Liv Jensen (21.12); Colleen Fotsch (21.96); Katherine Raatz (21.89)	1:27.22	Arizona; Margo Geer (21.69); Kaitlyn Flederbach (21.88); Emma Darlington (21.85); Aubrey Peacock (22.03)	1:27.45
400 freestyle relay	Stanford; Samantha Woodward (48.25); Madeline Schaefer (47.61); Andrea Murez (47.65); Elizabeth Webb (47.26)	3:10.77; AR	Auburn; Hannah Riordan (48.96); Olivia Scott (47.70); Emily Bos (48.47); Arianna Vanderpool-Wallace (46.36)	3:11.49	Georgia; Madeline Locus (48.32); Shannon Vreeland (47.99); Melanie Margalis (49.14); Megan Romano (46.11)	3:11.56
800 freestyle relay	Georgia; Shannon Vreeland (1:44.53); Jordan Mattern (1:44.75); Amber McDermott (1:44.30); Megan Romano (1:42.38)	6:55.96	California; Sara Isaković (1:43.92); Catherine Breed (1:45.58); Caroline Piehl (1:44.59); Liv Jensen (1:43.41)	6:57.50	Arizona; Alyssa Anderson (1:43.90); Margo Geer (1:43.57); Sarah Denninghoff (1:46.69); Monica Drake (1:44.20)	6:58.36
200 medley relay	California; Cindy Tran (23.44); Caitlin Leverenz (26.63); Colleen Fotsch (22.97); Liv Jensen (21.20)	1:34.24; US, AR	Arizona; Sarah Denninghoff (24.20); Chelsey Salli (27.24); Lauren Smart (23.29); Margo Geer (20.98)	1:35.71	Tennessee; Jennifer Connolly (24.04); Molly Hannis (26.98); Kelsey Floyd (23.02); Caroline Simmons (21.87)	1:35.91
400 medley relay	California; Cindy Tran (50.94); Caitlin Leverenz (57.71); Sara Isaković (51.21); Liv Jensen (48.24)	3:28.10; US	Arizona; Sarah Denninghoff (51.62); Ellyn Baumgardner (59.35); Lauren Smart (51.37); Margo Geer (59.92)	3:29.13	Tennessee; Jennifer Connolly (51.40); Molly Hannis (51.13); Kelsey Floyd (47.50); Lindsay Gendron (21.87)	3:29.92

Legend: US – U.S. Open record; AR – American record;

== Diving Results ==
Event	Gold		Silver		Bronze	
1 m diving	Haley Ishimatsu; USC	354.10	Jaele Patrick; Auburn	348.90	Vennie Dantin; Arizona	337.60
3 m diving	Jaele Patrick; Texas A&M	410.15	Bianca Alvarez; Ohio State	386.30	Samantha Pickens; USC	379.75
Platform diving	Chen Ni; Purdue	343.05	Tori Lamp; Tennessee	333.45	Amy Cozad; Indiana	329.35

== See also ==
- List of college swimming and diving teams
