= Arizona Wildcats men's golf =

College golf team

- Founded: 1934
- University: University of Arizona
- Conference: Big 12
- Athletic director: Dave Heeke
- Head coach: Jim Anderson (10th season)
- Location: Tucson, Arizona
- Course: Tucson Country Club; Par: 72; Yards: 7,022
- Nickname: Arizona
- Colors: Cardinal and Navy

NCAA champions
- 1992

NCAA match play
- 2026

NCAA Championship appearances
- 1941, 1960, 1961, 1963, 1981, 1980, 1982, 1983, 1984, 1987, 1988, 1989, 1990, 1991, 1992, 1993, 1994, 1995, 1996, 1997, 1998, 1999, 2000, 2001, 2002, 2003, 2004, 2005, 2006, 2007, 2009, 2011, 2022, 2024, 2026

Conference champions
- BIA; 1938, 1940, 1941, 1942, 1946, 1947, 1948, 1954, 1960 WAC Pac-10/12; 1987, 1991, 2004, 2021

Individual conference champions
- BIA; Bill Bell (1942) WAC; Drue Johnson (1969) Pac-10/12; Paul Nolen (1984); Larry Silveira (1987); Manny Zerman (1991); Jason Gore (1993); Jason Gore (1994); Ricky Barnes (2001); Henry Liaw (2004); Creighton Honeck (2008); Brad Reeves (2021)

The Arizona Wildcats men's golf team has a strong golf tradition, dating back to their first season in 1934. Since then they have won one national title in 1992.

On August 4, 2023, Arizona announced it would join the Big 12 Conference along with Arizona State, Colorado, and Utah beginning in the 2024–25 academic year.

Wildcats who have won the U.S. Amateur include Eric Meeks and Ricky Barnes. Besides Majors-winner Jim Furyk, a number of other former Wildcat players have gone on to win on the PGA Tour, including: Don Pooley, Dan Pohl, Robert Gamez, Mike Springer, Rory Sabbatini, Ted Purdy and Nate Lashley. Furyk is also a Champions Tour major winner, and the eighth player to win both the U.S. Open and U.S. Senior Open. In addition Wildcat Rory Sabbatini won a Silver Medal at the 2020 Summer Olympics competing for Slovakia.

== Yearly record ==
Season	Coach	Conference	NCAA
BIA
1935	Fred A. Enke	NA	
1936	Fred A. Enke	NA	
1937	Fred A. Enke	NA	
1938	Fred A. Enke	1st	
1939	Fred A. Enke	2nd	
1940	Fred A. Enke	1st	
1941	Fred A. Enke	1st	18th
1942	Fred A. Enke	1st	
1943	Fred A. Enke	DNP	
1944	Fred A. Enke	DNP	
1945	Fred A. Enke	DNP	
1946	Fred A. Enke	1st	
1947	Fred A. Enke	1st	
1948	Fred A. Enke	1st	
1949	Fred A. Enke	2nd	
1950	Fred A. Enke	2nd	
1951	Fred A. Enke	NA	
1952	Fred A. Enke	NA	
1953	Fred A. Enke	3rd	
1954	Fred A. Enke	1st	
1955	Fred A. Enke	2nd	
1956	Fred A. Enke	4th	
1957	Fred A. Enke	2nd	
1958	Fred A. Enke	3rd	
1959	Fred A. Enke	2nd	
1960	Fred A. Enke	1st	7th
1961	Fred A. Enke	2nd	T-7th
WAC
1962	Fred A. Enke	NA	
1963	Fred A. Enke	2nd	25th
1964	Fred A. Enke	4th	
1965	Fred A. Enke	5th	
1966	Fred A. Enke	6th	
1967	Roy Tatum	4th	
1968	Roy Tatum	4th	
1969	Roy Tatum	2nd	
1970	Roy Tatum	4th	
1971	Roy Tatum	4th	
1972	George Schafer	4th	
1973	John Gibson	4th	
1974	John Gibson	4th	
1975	John Gibson	5th	
1976	John Gibson	4th	
1977	John Gibson	4th	
1978	John Gibson	4th	
Pac-10/12
1979	Rick LaRose	2nd	
1980	Rick LaRose	5th	
1981	Rick LaRose	6th	
1982	Rick LaRose	6th	
1983	Rick LaRose	4th	
1984	Rick LaRose	3rd	
1985	Rick LaRose	6th	
1986	Rick LaRose	6th	
1987	Rick LaRose	1st	18th
1988	Rick LaRose	2nd	6th
1989	Rick LaRose	2nd	6th
1990	Rick LaRose	2nd	3rd
1991	Rick LaRose	1st	T–18th
1992	Rick LaRose	4th	1st
1993	Rick LaRose	2nd	16th
1994	Rick LaRose	2nd	14th
1995	Rick LaRose	3rd	10th
1996	Rick LaRose	6th	5th
1997	Rick LaRose	5th	26th
1998	Rick LaRose	3rd	30th
1999	Rick LaRose	8th	T–20th
2000	Rick LaRose	5th	3rd
2001	Rick LaRose	3rd	3rd
2002	Rick LaRose	7th	T–9th
2003	Rick LaRose	2nd	17th
2004	Rick LaRose	1st	3rd
2005	Rick LaRose	3rd	17th
2006	Rick LaRose	5th	13th
2007	Rick LaRose	6th	24th
2008	Rick LaRose	6th	
2009	Rick LaRose	T-8th	30th
2010	Rick LaRose	9th	
2011	Rick LaRose	7th	29th
2012	Rick LaRose	10th	
2013	Jim Anderson	T-8th	
2014	Jim Anderson	9th	
2015	Jim Anderson	9th	
2016	Jim Anderson	10th	
2017	Jim Anderson	9th	
2018	Jim Anderson	9th	
2019	Jim Anderson	8th	
2020	Jim Anderson	Season canceled due to the Coronavirus Pandemic	
2021	Jim Anderson	1st	
2022	Jim Anderson	11th	T–19th
2023	Jim Anderson	7th	
2024	Jim Anderson	9th	15th
2025	Jim Anderson	12th	
2026	Jim Anderson	2nd	T–5
Total		BIA: 9 WAC: 0 Pac-10/12:4	1

== Team tournament wins (79) ==
- 1938 Border Conference Championship
- 1940 Border Conference Championship
- 1941 Border Conference Championship
- 1942 Border Conference Championship
- 1946 Border Conference Championship
- 1947 Border Conference Championship
- 1948 Border Conference Championship
- 1954 Border Conference Championship
- 1960 Border Conference Championship
- 1969 All-America Intercollegiate Two-Ball Invitational
- 1979 United States Collegiate Two-Ball Championship
- 1981 All-America Intercollegiate Two-Ball Invitational
- 1981 Mesa McDonald's Invitational
- 1981 Central Arizona Invitational
- 1982 Arizona Collegiate
- 1982 Pima Invitational
- 1984 USIU Classic
- 1984 University of Pacific Invitational
- 1986 McDonald's Rebel Classic
- 1987 William H. Tucker Intercollegiate
- 1987 Fresno Pepsi Classic
- 1987 Western New Mexico Invitational
- 1987 ASU Thunderbird Intercollegiate
- 1987 All-America Intercollegiate Two-Ball Invitational
- 1987 Pac-10 Conference Championship
- 1988 PING-Arizona Intercollegiate
- 1988 Taylor Made Miami-Doral Intercollegiate
- 1988 United States Intercollegiate
- 1989 UCF Budget Classic
- 1989 NCAA West Regional Championship
- 1990 William H. Tucker Intercollegiate
- 1991 William H. Tucker Intercollegiate
- 1991 PING-International Intercollegiate
- 1991 UCF Budget Classic
- 1991 Rolex/Golf Digest Invitational
- 1991 Fresno Lexus Classic
- 1991 United States Intercollegiate
- 1991 Pac-10 Conference Championship
- 1991 NCAA West Regional Championship
- 1992 John Burns Intercollegiate
- 1992 United States Intercollegiate
- 1992 Golf Word/Palmetto Dunes Intercollegiate
- 1992 Perry Maxwell Intercollegiat
- 1992 NCAA West Regional Championship
- 1992 NCAA National Championship
- 1993 Golf Digest Invitational
- 1993 ASU Thunderbird Intercollegiate
- 1993 NCAA West Regional Championship
- 1996 PING-Arizona Intercollegiate
- 1996 Rolex Match Play Championship
- 1997 Missouri Bluffs Invitational
- 1997 Taylor Made Red River Classic
- 2000 Louisiana Classic
- 2000 NCAA West Regional Championship
- 2001 CGF Match Play Championships
- 2001 United States Intercollegiate
- 2003 PING-Arizona Intercollegiate
- 2003 John Burns Intercollegiate
- 2003 Oregon Duck Invitational
- 2003 Arizona NIT
- 2004 William H. Tucker Intercollegiate
- 2004 PING-Arizona Intercollegiate
- 2004 John Burns Intercollegiate
- 2004 Hall of Fame Invitational
- 2004 Pac-10 Conference Championship
- 2006 ASU Thunderbird Invitational
- 2006 NCAA West Regional Championship
- 2007 Nevada Wolf Pack Classic
- 2010 Braveheart Classic
- 2011 Anteater Invitational
- 2012 Arizona Intercollegiate
- 2018 Arizona Intercollegiate
- 2019 Arizona Intercollegiate
- 2020 Arizona Intercollegiate
- 2021 Arizona Intercollegiate
- 2021 The Prestige
- 2021 Pac-12 Championships
- 2022 Arizona Intercollegiate
- 2022 NCAA Bryan Regional

== Individual champions ==
=== Regional ===
NCAA West Regional Championship
Year	Name
1989	Robert Gamez
1992	Harry Rudolph
1993	Manny Zerman
2002	Ricky Barnes
2004	Chris Nallen

NCAA Southwest Regional Championship
Year	Name
2009	Tarquin MacManus

=== Conference ===
Arizona has had 10 separate golfers win a conference title on 11 separate occasions.

BIA
Year	Name
1942	Bill Bell

WAC
Year	Name
1969	Drue Johnson

Pac-10/12
Year	Name
1984	Paul Nolen
1987	Larry Silveira
1991	Manny Zerman
1993	Jason Gore
1994	Jason Gore
2001	Ricky Barnes
2004	Henry Liaw
2008	Creighton Honeck
2011	Brad Reeves

== National honors ==
NCAA Coach of the Year
- 1992 – Rick LaRose

Pac-10/12 Coach of the Year
- 1989 – Rick LaRose
- 1991 – Rick LaRose
- 2004 – Rick LaRose
- 2021 – Jim Anderson

U.S. Amateur champions
- 1988 – Eric Meeks
- 2002 – Ricky Barnes

Walker Cup Selections
- 1989 – Robert Gamez
- 1989 – Eric Meeks
- 1991 – David Berganio Jr.
- 1993 – David Berganio Jr.
- 1997 – Jason Gore
- 2001 – Chris Nallen

Fred Haskins Award
- 1989 – Robert Gamez

Jack Nicklaus Award
- 1989 – Robert Gamez

Ben Hogan Award
- 2000 – Ricky Barnes

National Freshman of the Year
- 2000 – Ricky Barnes

COSIDA Academic All-American
- 1991 – Trev Anderson (2nd team)
- 2021 – David Laskin (3rd team)

All-American (Selected by GCAA)
- 1967 – Drue Johnson (3rd team)
- 1969 – Drue Johnson (1st team)
- 1976 – Dan Pohl (1st team)
- 1987 – Larry Silveira (1st team)
- 1987 – Mike Springer (2nd team)
- 1988 – Larry Silveira (1st team)
- 1988 – Mike Springer (2nd team)
- 1988 – Robert Gamez (3rd team)
- 1988 – Eric Meeks (3rd team)
- 1989 – Robert Gamez (3rd team)
- 1991 – Christian Pena (1st team)
- 1991 – David Berganio Jr. (3rd team)
- 1992 – Harry Rudolph (1st team)
- 1992 – Manny Zerman (1st team)
- 1992 – David Berganio (3rd team)
- 1993 – David Berganio (1st team)
- 1993 – Manny Zerman (1st team)
- 1994 – David Howser (3rd team)
- 1995 – Ted Purdy (3rd team)
- 1997 – Rory Sabbatini (1st team)
- 1998 – Rory Sabbatini (1st team)
- 1999 – Derek Gillespie (2nd team)
- 2000 – Ricky Barnes (2nd team)
- 2000 – Derek Gillespie (3rd team)
- 2001 – Ricky Barnes (2nd team)
- 2001 – Chris Nallen (3rd team)
- 2003 – Ricky Barnes (1st team)
- 2003 – Chris Nallen (1st team)
- 2004 – Chris Nallen (1st team)
- 2018 – George Cunningham (2nd team)
- 2020 – Trevor Werbylo (3rd team)
- 2021 – Brad Reeves (2nd team)

Freshman All-American (Selected by GCAA)
- 2000 – Ricky Barnes
- 2001 – Chris Nallen
- 2004 – Henry Liaw

Pac-10/12 Player of the Year
- 1988 – Larry Silveira
- 1989 – Robert Gamez
- 1993 – David Berganio
- 1998 – Rory Sabbatini
- 2001 – Ricky Barnes (co-player)
- 2003 – Ricky Barnes
- 2021 – Brad Reeves

Pac-10/12 Freshman of the Year
- 2000 – Ricky Barnes
- 2004 – Henry Liaw

== Individual scoring record ==
Low 18-hole total in relation to par
Player	Date	Score
Trevor Werbylo	Mar 18, 2019	62 (−10)
Chris Nallen	Oct 14, 2003	62 (−9)
Brian Prouty	Jan 29, 2007	62 (−9)
Robert Gamez	Jun 7, 1989	62 (−8)

Low 18-hole aggregate total
Player	Date	Score
Robert Gamez	Jun 7, 1989	62 (−8)
Chris Nallen	Oct 14, 2003	62 (−9)
Brian Prouty	Jan 29, 2007	62 (−9)
Trevor Werbylo	Mar 18, 2019	62 (−10)

Low 72-hole total in relation to par
Player	Date	Score
Ricky Barnes	Apr 27–29, 2001	268 (−16)
Brad Reeves	Apr 26–28, 2021	272 (−16)
Ricky Barnes	May 31 − Jun 3, 2000	275 (−13)
Paul Nolen	May 2–4, 1984	276 (−12)
George Cunningham	Apr 23–25, 2018	272 (−12)

Low 72-hole total in relation to par
Player	Date	Score
Ricky Barnes	Apr 27–29, 2001	268 (−16)
George Cunningham	Apr 23–25, 2018	272 (−12)
Brad Reeves	Apr 26–28, 2021	272 (−16)
Chris Nallen	Jun 1–4, 2004	273 (−7)
Ricky Barnes	May 31 – June 3, 2000	275 (−13)

Career scoring average (min. 36 rounds played)
Player	Average	Years	Rounds
Chris Nallen	71.19	2000–04	167
Trevor Werbylo	71.44	2017–21	126
Ricky Barnes	71.48	1999–03	165
George Cunningham	71.87	2014–18	129
Henry Liaw	71.89	2003–06	123

Single-season scoring average (min. 18 rounds played)
Player		Years	Rounds
Chris Nallen	69.79	2003–04	43
Trevor Werbylo	70.04	2019–20	24
George Cunningham	70.40	2017–18	43
Brad Reeves	70.40	2020–21	25
Trevor Werbylo	70.72	2018–19	40

== Wildcats in the pros ==
Name	Tour	Seasons as Wildcat	Post-Wildcat accomplishment
Trevor Werbylo	PGA Forme Tour	2018–21	Turned pro in 2021
George Cunningham	PGA Tour Canada	2015–18	Won 2018 Golf BC Championship
Jordan Gumberg	PGA Tour Canada	2016–17	Turned pro in 2017
Brian Prouty	Web.com Tour	2004–07	Turned pro in 2007
Nate Lashley	PGA Tour	2002–05	Won 1 PGA Tour event (2019 Rocket Mortgage Classic)
Ricky Barnes	PGA Tour	2000–03	Six-time PGA Tour top-10 finishes including T-2 at 2009 U.S. Open & 2010 Masters Tournament; Set 36-hole scoring record at 2009 U.S. Open; 2002 U.S. Amateur champion
Chris Nallen	Nationwide Tour	2001–04	Won 1 Nationwide Tour event
Rory Sabbatini	PGA Tour	1995–98	Six-time PGA Tour winner (2000 Air Canada Championship, 2003 FBR Capital Open, 2006 Nissan Open, 2007 Crowne Plaza Invitational at Colonial, 2009 HP Byron Nelson Championship, 2011 Honda Classic), 2020 Olympic Silver Medalist, 2003 WGC-World Cup winner
Ted Purdy	PGA Tour	1993–96	Won 1 PGA Tour event (2005 Byron Nelson Championship)
David Berganio Jr.	PGA Tour	1991–93	Four PGA Tour top-10 finishes, 3X Nike Tour winner
Manny Zerman	Foreign tour	1990–93	Turned pro in 1993
Jim Furyk	PGA Tour	1989–92	17-Time PGA Tour winner including 2003 U.S. Open, 2010 FedEx Cup Playoffs Champion, 2002 Memorial Tournament, Las Vegas Invitational (3), Canadian Open (2), RBC Heritage(2); 23 PGA Tour Top-10 Major Finishes including 2006 U.S. Open, 2007 U.S. Open & 2013 PGA Championship Runner-Up; 9 Time Ryder Cup Participant (1997, 1999 (winners), 2002, 2004, 2006, 2008 (winners), 2010, 2012, 2014); Ryder Cup U.S. Team Captain (2018); 7 Time Presidents Cup Participant (1998, 2000 (winners), 2003 (tie), 2005 (winners), 2007 (winners), 2009 (winners), 2011 (winners)); 3x PGA Champions Tour Winner including 2021 U.S. Senior Open; Shot first round of 58 in PGA history in 2016; Ranks 4th All-Time on the PGA Tour Career Money Leaders with $71.5 Million Dollars; Top 50 All-Time in PGA Tour Wins & Most Top-10s in a Career 188 (since 1980)
Christian Pena	Foreign tour	1988–91	Turned pro in 1992
Larry Silveira	PGA Tour	1987–88	Turned pro in 1989, Nike Tour winner
Robert Gamez	PGA Tour	1987–89	3X PGA Tour winner (1990 Northern Telecom Tucson Open, 1990 Nestle Invitational & 2005 Valero Texas Open
Mike Springer	PGA Tour	1985–88	2X PGA Tour winner (1994 KMart Greater Greensboro Open & 1994 Greater Milwaukee Open)
Eric Meeks	Nationwide Tour	1986–88	1998 U.S. Amateur champion
Jerry Foltz	Nike Tour	1984–85	Turned pro in 1984, Nike Tour winner
Mike Cunning	PGA Tour	1979–80	Asian Tour winner (2003 Royal Challenge Indian Open)
Dan Pohl	PGA Tour	1975–76	2X PGA Tour winner (1986 Colonial National Invitation & 1986 NEC World Series of Golf)
Don Pooley	PGA Tour	1970–73	2X PGA Tour winner (1980 B.C. Open & 1987 Memorial Tournament), 2X Champions Tour winner

Source: Arizona 2021-22 Golf Media Guide
