= Tennessee Volunteers men's golf =

University men's golf team

- University: University of Tennessee
- Conference: SEC
- Athletic director: Danny White
- Head coach: Men's: Brennan Webb (7th season)
- Location: Knoxville, Tennessee
- Course: Mack and Jonnie Day Golf Facility
- Nickname: Tennessee Volunteers
- Colors: Orange, white, and smokey gray

NCAA Championship appearances
- 1955, 1965, 1972, 1980, 1981, 1982, 1995, 1996, 1997, 2003, 2005, 2007, 2009, 2010, 2011, 2013, 2021, 2024, 2025, 2026

NCAA regional appearances
- 1990, 1992, 1993, 1995, 1996, 1997, 2000, 2001, 2002, 2003, 2004, 2005, 2006, 2007, 2008, 2009, 2010, 2011, 2012, 2013, 2014, 2016, 2018, 2019, 2021, 2022, 2023, 2024, 2025, 2026

Conference champions
- 1980, 1990, 2007

Individual conference champions
- Bert Greene 1964; Mickey Mabry 1972; Mike Sposa 1990; David Skinns 2005; Caleb Surratt 2023

The Tennessee Volunteers men's golf team represents the University of Tennessee located in Knoxville, Tennessee. The Vols compete at the Division I level of the National Collegiate Athletic Association (NCAA) and the Southeastern Conference (SEC). The Vols currently rotate between 16 different golf courses located in the state of Tennessee, with their main headquarters at the Blackburn-Furrow Golf Clubhouse at Day Golf Practice Facility, less than a mile from campus. The current coach for the Volunteer men is Brennan Webb who is in his 7th season as Tennessee's head coach. Since the Vol's inaugural season in 1934 they have won three SEC championships, competed in 18 NCAA Championships, and participated in 29 NCAA Regionals.

== History ==
The Volunteers men's golf team began play in 1934 under coach James Walls. It would take forty-five years before the Vols would win their first conference title mainly under the terrific play of Jim Gallagher Jr. and Stuart Smith, who both finished in the top five of the tournament. That same year, the Vols reached their highest finish in the NCAA Championships, finishing in 6th place. In 1988, Tennessee had its deepest run in the NCAA singles competition when Tom Carr finished runner-up among the other individuals.

=== Jim Kelson era ===
When Jim Kelson was hired in 1998, the Vols were just coming off a losing season that ended the three-year streak of NCAA Tournament appearances. In his first year, he led his team to 101 wins and a 5th-place finish in the SEC Tournament.

Kelson guided Tennessee to three straight NCAA Championship berths from 2009–2011. It was Tennessee's fifth NCAA Championship berth under Kelson since the 2003 season. He also guided the Vols to regional play for a school-record 15 consecutive seasons from 2000–2014. The 2007 season became a very memorable season for coach Kelson as he helped end a 17-year drought for the Vols in the SEC tournament by beating Alabama by two strokes to claim the SEC title. In the 2010 season, Kelson helped the Volunteers capture the Carpet Capital Collegiate Golf Tournament for the first time in school history. During his tenure, the Vols won 25 tournament championships, as well as several team individual accolades, and made 7 NCAA Championship appearances.

On June 12, 2018, Kelson announced he was retiring and stepped down from his position as head coach. Sean Pacetti served as the interim head coach until Brennan Webb, the former head golf coach at Middle Tennessee University, was hired on June 28, 2018 as the next head golf coach at Tennessee.

=== Brennan Webb era ===
Under current head coach Brennan Webb, the Vols have posted four consecutive seasons with a win percentage above .600. Additionally, under the new SEC Championship match-play structure (which began in 2018), Webb has led the Vols to top 8 SEC finishes and the SEC Quarterfinals each year. The Vols have also made six NCAA Regionals in Webb's seven years (the 2020 regionals were cancelled), and qualified for the 2021 NCAA Championships, ending a 7 year program drought, then returned to the NCAA Championships in 2024. Webb is the all time program leader in terms of winning percentage.

== Head coaches ==
#	Coach	Years	Seasons	Record				SEC; Titles	NCAA; Regionals	NCAA; Championship; Appearances
#	Coach	Years	Seasons	Won	Lost	Tie	%	SEC; Titles	NCAA; Regionals	NCAA; Championship; Appearances
1	James Walls	1934–1953	16	37	53	1	.412	–	–	–
2	Lloyd Foree	1954–1967	14	64	55	4	.537	–	–	2
3	Sid Hatfield	1968–1976	9.5	587	332	3	.638	–	–	1
4	Mike Malarkey	1977–1998	22.5	2273	1811	56	.556	2	6	6
5	Jim Kelson	1998-2018	20	2024	1422	56	.586	1	17	7
6	Brennan Webb	2018-present	7	632	137	10	.818	–	5	2
Total			89	5555	3909	138	.587	3	29	18

Note: Records for coaches James Walls and Lloyd Foree are incomplete for certain seasons.

== Yearly record ==
Season	Coach	Overall				Conference				Conference Championship	NCAA Regional	NCAA Championship
Season	Coach	Won	Lost	Tie	%	Won	Lost	Tie	%	Conference Championship	NCAA Regional	NCAA Championship
Southeastern Conference
1934	James Walls	0	4	–	.000	–	–	–	–	–	–	–
1935	James Walls	12	5	–	.706	–	–	–	–	–	–	–
1936	James Walls	3	3	–	.500	–	–	–	–	–	–	–
1937	James Walls	3	5	1	.333	–	–	–	–	–	–	–
1938	James Walls	1	8	–	.111	–	–	–	–	–	–	–
1939	James Walls	3	5	–	.375	–	–	–		–	–	–
1940	James Walls	3	6	–	.333	–	–	–	–	–	–	–
1941	James Walls	6	5	–	.545	–	–	–	–	–	–	–
1942	James Walls	2	5	–	.286	–	–	–	–	–	–	–
1943–1946	James Walls	No team (WWII)										
1947	James Walls	4	7	–	.364	–	–	–	–	–	–	–
1948–1953	James Walls	Records unavailable										
1954	Lloyd Foree	Records unavailable										
1955	Lloyd Foree	Records unavailable								–	–	30th (639)
1956–1962	Lloyd Foree	Records unavailable										
1963	Lloyd Foree	3	8	–	.273	1	5	–	.167	–	–	–
1964	Lloyd Foree	11	4	1	.688	4	2	–	.667	–	–	–
1965	Lloyd Foree	27	28	1	.482	8	7	–	.533	5th (605)	–	T–15th (607)
1966	Lloyd Foree	7	10	2	.368	5	7	1	.423	T–7th (913)	–	–
1967	Lloyd Foree	16	5	–	.762	10	4	–	.714	4th (914)	–	–
1968	Sid Hatfield	22	4	1	.815	11	2	–	.846	2nd (850)	–	–
1969	Sid Hatfield	28	7	–	.800	7	4	–	.636	4th (1117)	–	–
1969–70	Sid Hatfield	61	31	–	.663	6	3	–	.667	4th (1138)	–	–
1970–71	Sid Hatfield	69	36	–	.657	5	4	–	.556	5th (1158)	–	–
1971–72	Sid Hatfield	64	28	–	.696	8	2	–	.800	3rd (1128)	–	13th (1217)
1972–73	Sid Hatfield	83	28	–	.748	6	4	–	.600	5th (1151)	–	–
1973–74	Sid Hatfield	47	57	–	.452	7	26	–	.212	6th (1161)	–	–
1974–75	Sid Hatfield	76	58	1	.563	10	22	–	.313	6th (1149)	–	–
1975–76	Sid Hatfield	127	61	1	.672	12	27	–	.308	6th (1121)	–	–
1976–77	Hatfield/ Malarkey	60	115	1	.341	3	27	–	.100	8th (1121)	–	–
1977–78	Mike Malarkey	83	116	–	.417	5	25	–	.167	7th (1197)	–	–
1978–79	Mike Malarkey	104	135	–	.425	12	36	–	.250	7th (915)	–	–
1979–80	Mike Malarkey	184	61	1	.748	45	19	1	.700	1st (884)	–	6th (1188)
1980–81	Mike Malarkey	189	76	1	.711	26	16	–	.619	2nd (885)	–	T–7th (1180)
1981–82	Mike Malarkey	156	52	2	.743	44	16	–	.733	5th (887)	–	22nd (893)
1982–83	Mike Malarkey	137	65	1	.675	34	24	1	.585	5th (896)	–	–
1983–84	Mike Malarkey	100	93	2	.513	17	25	1	.407	5th (893)	–	–
1984–85	Mike Malarkey	109	91	3	.537	15	14	1	.517	7th (899)	–	–
1985–86	Mike Malarkey	90	111	4	.439	10	15	1	.404	T–7th (907)	–	–
1986–87	Mike Malarkey	152	54	–	.738	18	14	–	.563	4th (878)	–	–
1987–88	Mike Malarkey	96	35	3	.716	15	12	–	.556	6th (891)	–	–
1988–89	Mike Malarkey	87	74	5	.524	21	20	1	.512	4th (897)	–	–
1989–90	Mike Malarkey	94	86	–	.522	22	25	–	.468	1st (866)	12th (876)	–
1990–91	Mike Malarkey	45	83	5	.338	7	22	–	.241	8th (890)	–	–
1991–92	Mike Malarkey	76	91	8	.434	26	31	4	.459	T–8th (911)	18th (925)	–
1992–93	Mike Malarkey	122	63	3	.649	38	22	2	.629	T–6th (890)	13th (883)	–
1993–94	Mike Malarkey	71	68	1	.507	27	26	1	.509	T–2nd (875)	–	–
1994–95	Mike Malarkey	111	66	7	.603	32	15	1	.677	5th (871)	T–7th (886)	T–16th (592)
1995–96	Mike Malarkey	101	88	5	.521	29	34	2	.462	10th (894)	T–9th (910)	23rd (617)
1996–97	Mike Malarkey	95	97	3	.487	27	41	1	.399	9th (915)	7th (888)	28th (599)
1997–98	Mike Malarkey	31	113	1	.214	11	42	1	.213	T–4th (579)	–	–
1998–99	Jim Kelson	101	68	7	.574	26	25	2	.509	5th (929)	–	–
1999–00	Jim Kelson	94	99	1	.485	23	38	–	.377	10th (905)	T–13th (900)	–
2000–01	Jim Kelson	84	96	5	.454	17	32	2	.353	6th (879)	21st (921)	–
2001–02	Jim Kelson	124	52	1	.701	36	23	–	.610	7th (881)	T–13th (904)	–
2002–03	Jim Kelson	126	98	1	.560	31	23	–	.574	4th (870)	4th (863)	23rd (925)
2003–04	Jim Kelson	99	87	2	.527	20	28	1	.707	6th (868)	18th (891)	–
2004–05	Jim Kelson	121	59	4	.658	27	19	2	.583	5th (889)	2nd (837)	11th (1177)
2005–06	Jim Kelson	77	83	1	.478	19	28	–	.404	9th (875)	18th (901)	–
2006–07	Jim Kelson	142	58	3	.700	28	20	–	.583	1st (869)	5th (904)	T–14th (851)
2007–08	Jim Kelson	121	47	3	.708	19	16	–	.543	6th (881)	11th (902)	–
2008–09	Jim Kelson	134	50	2	.720	23	16	–	.590	11th (888)	2nd (878)	12th (875)
2009–10	Jim Kelson	98	72	7	.554	19	15	–	.559	8th (861)	T–3rd (886)	T–25th (884)
2010–11	Jim Kelson	89	84	4	.503	21	21	1	.500	3rd (846)	T–4th (865)	24th (910)
2011–12	Jim Kelson	79	60	1	.564	12	11	–	.522	8th (868)	6th (837)	–
2012–13	Jim Kelson	116	62	4	.637	7	30	1	.197	14th (895)	4th (892)	T–19th (850)
2013–14	Jim Kelson	71	75	4	.473	6	23	1	.217	T–12th (859)	11th (894)	–
2014–15	Jim Kelson	74	81	1	.474	4	23	–	.148	12th (860)	–	–
2015–16	Jim Kelson	87	66	1	.565	8	24	–	.250	9th (875)	11th (926)	–
2016–17	Jim Kelson	76	68	1	.524	3	21	–	.125	13th (874)	–	–
2017–18	Jim Kelson	111	57	3	.649	9	15	1	.380	9th (854)	T–10th (900)	–
2018–19	Brennan Webb	95	46	3	.660	17	12	3	.578	T–5th (846); Match-Play QF	6th (873)	–
2019–20	Brennan Webb	71	29	3	.689	8	7	–	.533	N/A	N/A	N/A
2020–21	Brennan Webb	110	50	8	.655	67	31	5	.675	T–2nd (850); Match-Play QF	T–2nd (849)	T–17th (873)
2021–22	Brennan Webb	85	40	2	.669	15	19	–	.441	7th (843); Match-Play QF	7th (880)	–
2022–23	Brennan Webb	123	35	3	.764	39	12	1	.760	1st (826) Match-Play SF	8th (889)	–
2023–24	Brennan Webb	143	33	33	.807	31	14	1	.685	1st (826) Match-Play SF	2nd (841)	10th (1180)
Total		5555	3909	138	.587	1113	1241	39	.473	3	29 Regional; Appearances	18 Championship; Appearances

*Note: The 2019–20 season was suspended in mid-March 2020 and later canceled due to the coronavirus (COVID-19) global health crisis.

== Individual honors ==
In the past 76 years of the Vols men's golf program four UT golfers have won SEC individual titles and 38 UT golfers have earned 58 All-SEC honors, in-addition to 20 Vols earning All-American honors.

=== All-Americans ===
- George Cadle – 1971
- Tom Carr – 1988
- Spencer Cross – 2020
- Charlie Ford – 2006
- Jim Gallagher Jr. – 1980, 1982
- Oliver Goss – 2013
- Bert Greene – 1964, 1965
- John Hamarik – 1981
- David Holmes – 2009
- Kevin Janiga – 1980
- Rick Lamb – 2013
- Rhys Nevin – 2020
- Mickey Mabry – 1972
- Ross McGowan – 2005
- Chris Paisley – 2009
- Lorenzo Scalise – 2018
- David Skinns – 2002, 2003, 2005
- Stuart Smith – 1982, 1983
- Mike Sposa – 1990, 1991
- Robin Wingardh – 2011

== Tour professionals ==
Several former University of Tennessee golf players have played on major golf tours.

- PGA Tour
  - George Cadle
  - Mike Emery, Jr.
  - Jim Estes
  - Jim Gallagher Jr.
  - Randy Glover
  - Bert Greene
  - John Hamarik
  - Rick Lamb
  - Tom McGinnis
  - Tad Rhyan
  - Mason Rudolph
  - Stuart Smith
  - Mike Sposa
  - Harry Taylor
- European Tour
  - Ross McGowan
  - Chris Paisley
- Web.com Tour
  - Tom Carr
  - Gibby Gilbert III
  - Andrew Pratt
  - Jake Reeves
- Challenge Tour
  - Charlie Ford

=== Notable amateur victories ===
Garrick Porteous, who played for the Volunteers from 2008–2012, won The Amateur Championship in 2013.

== Mack and Jonnie Day Golf Facility ==
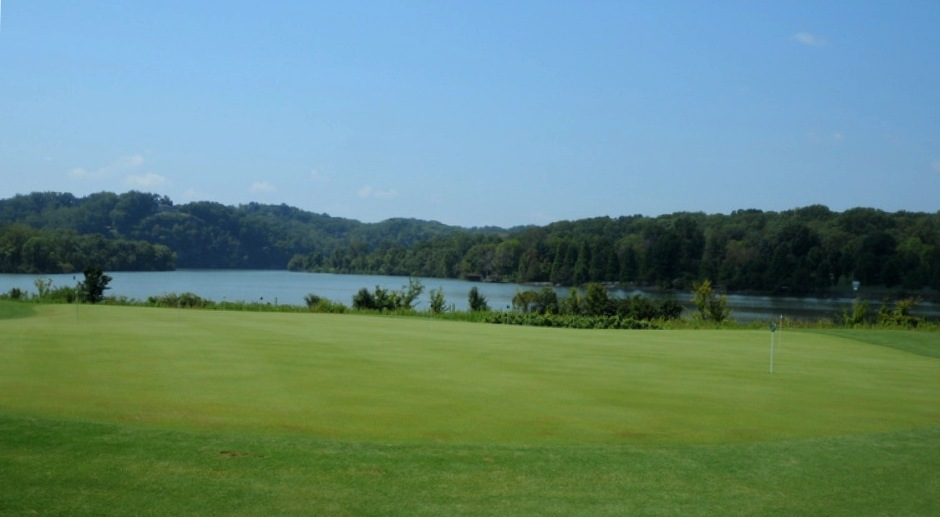
Mack and Jonnie Day Golf Facility course next to the Tennessee River.

Although the Vols men’s and women’s golf teams host their home matches at a variety of different courses in the state of Tennessee they have recently welcomed a new state of the art practice facility on campus where the team can practice all year round. The practice facility resides on a 28-acre lot across from the University's Medical Center and contains a 3-hole course plus putting green. The new facility opened in 2010 and was finished in 2019 with the Blackburn-Furrow Golf Clubhouse. The 8,300 square foot clubhouse features offices for both the men and women's teams, heated hitting bays for year-round practice, video training space, locker rooms, team lounges, over 1,200 square feet of outdoor deck spaces, and a virtual-putting green.

== See also ==
- Tennessee Volunteers
- Tennessee Volunteers women's golf
