= 2001 NCAA Division I men's golf championship =

2001 NCAA Division I Men's Golf Championship
Tournament information
- Location: Durham, North Carolina, U.S. 35.992818°N 78.947240°W
- Course: Duke University Golf Club

Statistics
- Field: 30 teams

Champion
- Team: Florida (4th title); Individual: Nick Gilliam, Florida
- Team: 1,126; Individual: 276

Location map
- Location in the United States Location in North Carolina

The 2001 NCAA Division I Men's Golf Championships were contested at the 63rd annual NCAA-sanctioned golf tournament for determining the individual and team national champions of men's collegiate golf at the Division I level in the United States.

The tournament was held at the Duke University Golf Club in Durham, North Carolina.

Florida won the team championship, the Gators' fourth NCAA title and first since 1993.

Nick Gilliam, also from Florida, won the individual title.

== Qualifying ==
The NCAA held three regional qualifying tournaments, with the top ten teams from each event qualifying for the national championship.

Regional name	Golf course	Dates
East Regional	Golden Horseshoe Golf Club; Williamsburg, Virginia	May 17–19, 2001
Central Regional	Karsten Creek Golf Club; Stillwater, Oklahoma	May 17–19, 2001
West Regional	Trysting Tree Golf Course; Corvallis, Oregon	May 17–19, 2001

== Individual results ==
=== Individual champion ===
- Nick Gilliam, Florida (276)

== Team results ==
=== Finalists ===
Rank	Team	Score
1	Florida	1,126
2	Clemson	1,144
3	Arizona	1,145
4	Georgia Tech	1,148
5	Georgia	1,152
6	Arizona State	1,162
7	Augusta State	1,164
8	Virginia Tech	1,165
9	East Tennessee State	1,167
10	Wake Forest	1,168
11	Pacific	1,177
T12	UAB	1,179
T12	Oklahoma	1,179
T12	Oregon State	1,179
15	SMU	1,190

=== Eliminated after 36 holes ===
Rank	Team	Score
16	College of Charleston	590
17	UCLA	591
T18	Ole Miss	592
T18	Toledo	592
T20	Houston	593
T20	Minnesota	593
T20	South Carolina	593
T20	Stanford	593
T24	Georgia Southern	594
T24	Oklahoma State (DC)	594
26	Washington	598
27	NC State	599
28	Purdue	602
29	UC Irvine	612
30	Kent State	620

- DC = Defending champions
- Debut appearance
