= 1989 NCAA Division I men's golf championship =

Golf tournament

1989 NCAA Division I Men's Golf Championship
Tournament information
- Dates: June 7–10, 1989
- Location: Edmond, Oklahoma, U.S. 35.716454°N 97.493512°W
- Course: Oak Tree Country Club

Statistics
- Par: 70
- Length: 7,087 yards (6,480 m)
- Field: 156 players, 30 teams

Champion
- Team: Oklahoma (1st title); Individual: Phil Mickelson, Arizona State
- Team: 1,139 (+19); Individual: 281 (+1)

Location map
- Location in the United States Location in Oklahoma

The 1989 NCAA Division I Men's Golf Championships were contested at the 51st annual NCAA-sanctioned golf tournament for determining the individual and team national champions of men's collegiate golf at the Division I level in the United States. The tournament was held at the Oak Tree Country Club in Edmond, Oklahoma, a suburb of Oklahoma City from June 7 to 10.

Oklahoma won the team championship, the Sooners' first NCAA title.

Future professional and six-time major champion Phil Mickelson, from Arizona State, won the individual title, his first of three.

== Regional qualifiers ==
This was the first year that three preliminary regional qualifiers were played to select the teams for the NCAA championship. The regionals were played May 25–27.

Regional name	Golf course	Location	Qualified teams
East	Long Bay Club	Myrtle Beach, South Carolina	Florida, Georgia Tech, North Carolina, Clemson, Auburn, Georgia, Florida State, LSU, South Carolina, East Tennessee State, North Carolina State
Central	Stonebridge Country Club	McKinney, Texas	Oklahoma, Oklahoma State, Colorado, Houston, Illinois, Arkansas, Kansas, Texas, Miami (OH), Southwest Louisiana
West	El Paso Country Club	El Paso, Texas	Arizona, Arizona State, Southern California, Fresno State, UNLV, UTEP, Nevada, Washington, UCLA

== Individual results ==
Rank	Player	Team	Score
1	Phil Mickelson	Arizona State	281 (+1)
T2	Robert Gamez	Arizona	285 (+5)
T2	Doug Martin	Oklahoma	285 (+5)
T2	Ricky Bell	Oklahoma	285 (+5)
T2	Kevin Wentworth	Oklahoma State	285 (+5)
T2	Dave Stockton	Southern California	285 (+5)
T2	Brian Nelson	Texas	285 (+5)

== Team results ==
=== Finalists ===
Rank	Team	Score
1	Oklahoma	1,139
2	Texas	1,158
3	Clemson	1,160
4	Oklahoma State	1,162
5	Arizona State	1,166
6	Arizona	1,170
7	Arkansas	1,171
T8	LSU	1,173
T8	UCLA (DC)	1,173
10	Georgia	1,174
11	Florida	1,180
12	East Tennessee State	1,185
13	North Carolina	1,187
14	Fresno State	1,192
15	Southwest Louisiana	1,194
16	Florida State	1,196
17	UTEP	1,197

=== Eliminated after 36 holes ===
Rain on the first day of the championship forced the introduction of a 36-hole cut.

Rank	Team	Score
T18	Georgia Tech	593
T18	South Carolina	593
T18	USC	593
21	Miami (OH)	594
22	Kansas	595
T23	Illinois	596
T23	Washington	596
25	Nevada	598
26	Houston	599
27	UNLV	600
28	NC State	603
T29	Auburn	609
T29	Colorado	609

- DC = Defending champions
- Debut appearance
