= 1998 NCAA Division I men's golf championship =

1998 NCAA Division I Men's Golf Championship
Tournament information
- Location: Albuquerque, New Mexico, U.S. 35.039333°N 106.610778°W
- Course: UNM Golf Course

Statistics
- Field: 30 teams

Champion
- Team: UNLV (1st title); Individual: James McLean, Minnesota
- Team: 1,118 (−3); Individual: 271

Location map
- Location in the United States Location in New Mexico

The 1998 NCAA Division I Men's Golf Championships were contested at the 60th annual NCAA-sanctioned golf tournament for determining the individual and team national champions of men's collegiate golf at the Division I level in the United States.

The tournament was held at the University of New Mexico Golf Course in Albuquerque, New Mexico.

UNLV won the team championship, the Rebels' first NCAA title.

James McLean, from Minnesota, won the individual title.

== Qualifying ==
Three regional qualifying tournaments were held, with the top ten teams qualifying for the national championship from each event.

Regional name	Golf course	Dates
East Regional	Details unavailable	
Central Regional	Oak Hills Country Club; San Antonio, Texas	May 14–16, 1998
West Regional	Karsten Golf Course; Tempe, Arizona	May 14–16, 1998

== Individual results ==
=== Individual champion ===
- James McLean, Minnesota (271)

== Team results ==
=== Finalists ===
Rank	Team	Score
1	UNLV	1,118
2	Clemson	1,121
3	Georgia Tech	1,122
4	Oklahoma State	1,127
5	Arizona State	1,130
6	Ohio State	1,135
7	Minnesota	1,137
T8	Houston	1,142
T8	UCLA	1,142
10	Auburn	1,145
11	South Carolina	1,146
12	TCU	1,148
13	Miami (OH)	1,151
14	Florida	1,154
15	California	1,155

=== Eliminated after 36 holes ===
Rank	Team	Score
16	New Mexico	574
17	Georgia	575
18	NC State	576
19	Northwestern	577
20	Nebraska	578
21	East Tennessee State	579
22	Fresno State	580
23	Southeastern Louisiana	580
24	Kent State	583
25	North Carolina	585
26	UC Santa Barbara	589
T27	Augusta State	590
T27	Oregon	590
29	Oklahoma	592
30	Arizona	593

- DC = Defending champions
- Debut appearance
