= 2005 NCAA Division I men's golf championship =

2005 NCAA Division I Men's Golf Championship
Tournament information
- Location: Owings Mills, Maryland, U.S. 39.451°N 76.744°W
- Course: Caves Valley Golf Club

Statistics
- Field: 30 teams

Champion
- Team: Georgia (2nd title); Individual: James Lepp, Washington
- Team: 1,135; Individual: 276

Location map
- Location in the United States Location in Maryland

The 2005 NCAA Division I Men's Golf Championships were contested at the 67th annual NCAA-sanctioned golf tournament for determining the individual and team national champions of men's collegiate golf at the Division I level in the United States.

The tournament was held at the Caves Valley Golf Club in Owings Mills, Maryland.

Georgia won the team championship, the Bulldogs' second NCAA title and the first since 1999.

James Lepp, from Washington, won the individual title.

== Qualifying ==
The NCAA held three regional qualifying tournaments, with the top ten teams from each event qualifying for the national championship.

Regional name	Golf course	Dates
East Regional	Golf Club of Tennessee; Kingston Springs, Tennessee	May 19–21, 2005
Central Regional	Warren Golf Course; South Bend, Indiana	May 19–21, 2005
West Regional	Stanford Golf Course; Stanford, California	May 19–21, 2005

== Individual results ==
=== Individual champion ===
- James Lepp, Washington (276)

== Team results ==
Rank	Team	Score
1	Georgia	1,135
2	Georgia Tech	1,146
3	Washington	1,153
4	BYU	1,154
5	New Mexico	1,158
6	USC	1,159
7	Kentucky	1,161
T8	Duke	1,162
T8	UNLV	1,162
10	Augusta State	1,164
T11	Arizona State	1,170
T11	Tennessee	1,170
T13	Georgia Southern	1,173
T13	Georgia State	1,173
15	Oklahoma State	1,178

=== Eliminated after 54 holes ===
Rank	Team	Score
16	Wake Forest	884
17	Arizona	885
T18	Florida	888
T18	Stanford	888
T20	Coastal Carolina	890
T20	Missouri	890
22	SMU	892
T23	Purdue	893
T23	San Diego State	893
T23	Texas	893
T26	Arkansas	894
T26	Texas A&M	894
28	Alabama	897
29	Tulsa	899
30	UCLA	904

- DC = Defending champions
- Debut appearance
