= 1992 NCAA Division I men's golf championship =

Golf tournament

1992 NCAA Division I Men's Golf Championship
Tournament information
- Dates: June 3–6, 1992
- Location: Albuquerque, New Mexico, U.S. 35.039333°N 106.610778°W
- Course: University of New Mexico Golf Course

Statistics
- Par: 72
- Length: 7,246 yards (6,626 m)
- Field: 156 players, 30 teams

Champion
- Team: Arizona (1st title); Individual: Phil Mickelson, Arizona State
- Team: 1,129 (−23); Individual: 271 (−18)

Location map
- Location in the United States Location in New Mexico

The 1992 NCAA Division I Men's Golf Championships were contested at the 54th annual NCAA-sanctioned golf tournament for determining the individual and team national champions of men's collegiate golf at the Division I level in the United States. The tournament was held at the University of New Mexico Golf Course in Albuquerque, New Mexico from June 3–6.

Arizona won the team championship, the Wildcats' first NCAA title.

Future professional and six-time major winner Phil Mickelson, from Arizona State, won the individual title, his third of three.

== Regional qualifiers ==
The regionals were played May 21–23.

Regional name	Golf course	Location	Qualified teams
East	Seven Oaks Golf Course	Hamilton, New York	Florida, Alabama, Georgia Tech, Clemson, East Tennessee State, Wake Forest, Central Florida, LSU, South Carolina, North Carolina, Virginia
Central	Stonebridge Country Club	McKinney, Texas	Texas, Arkansas, Oklahoma State, Ohio State, Houston, Oklahoma, Kent State, Wisconsin, Rice, TCU
West	Tucson National	Tucson, Arizona	Arizona, Arizona State, UNLV, Fresno State, New Mexico, San José State, Stanford, BYU, UC Irvine

== Individual results ==
Rank	Player	Team	Score
1	Phil Mickelson	Arizona State	271 (−17)
2	Harry Rudolph	Arizona	278 (−10)
3	Manny Zerman	Arizona	279 (−9)
T4	Jaxon Brigman	Oklahoma State	282 (−6)
T4	Justin Leonard	Texas	282 (−6)

== Team results ==
=== Finalists ===
Rank	Team	Score
1	Arizona	1,129
2	Arizona State	1,136
3	Oklahoma State (DC)	1,144
4	UNLV	1,150
5	Georgia Tech	1,151
6	Texas	1,152
7	Florida	1,155
8	Arkansas	1,156
9	Stanford	1,158
10	New Mexico	1,161
11	Alabama	1,163
12	Clemson	1,166
13	Houston	1,168
14	Oklahoma	1,171
15	Central Florida	1,184

=== Eliminated after 36 holes ===
Rank	Team	Score
T16	Fresno State	586
T16	TCU	586
T16	Virginia	586
T16	Wisconsin	586
T20	BYU	587
T20	San José State	587
22	LSU	588
23	North Carolina	590
24	Wake Forest	591
T25	East Tennessee State	592
T25	Kent State	592
27	Ohio State	594
28	South Carolina	595
29	UC Irvine	606
30	Rice	619

- DC = Defending champions
- Debut appearance
