= 1997 NCAA Division I men's golf championship =

Golf tournament

1997 NCAA Division I Men's Golf Championship
Tournament information
- Dates: May 28–31, 1997
- Location: Lake Forest, Illinois, U.S. 42.233166°N 87.895144°W
- Course: Conway Farms Golf Club

Statistics
- Par: 71
- Length: 6,726 yards (6,150 m)
- Field: 156 players, 30 teams

Champion
- Team: Pepperdine (1st title); Individual: Charles Warren, Clemson
- Team: 1,148 (+12); Individual: 279 (−5)

Location map
- Location in the United States Location in Illinois

The 1997 NCAA Division I Men's Golf Championships were contested at the 58th annual NCAA-sanctioned golf tournament for determining the individual and team national champions of men's collegiate golf at the Division I level in the United States. The tournament was held at the Conway Farms Golf Club in Lake Forest, Illinois, a suburb of Chicago form May 28–31.

Pepperdine won the team championship, the Waves' first NCAA title. Charles Warren, from Clemson, won the individual title through a playoff.

== Regional qualifiers ==
The regionals were played May 16–18.

Regional name	Golf course	Location	Qualified teams
East	The Homestead	Hot Springs, Virginia	Auburn, Clemson, Wake Forest, Duke, North Carolina, Florida, Tennessee, Virginia, South Carolina, East Tennessee State, LSU
Central	Jimmie Austin Golf Club	Norman, Oklahoma	Oklahoma State, TCU, Texas A&M, Arkansas, Houston, Ohio State, Texas, Michigan, Drake, Northwestern
West	Carlton Oaks Country Club	Santee, California	UNLV, Arizona State, Southern California, Arizona, New Mexico, UCLA, San José State, Washington, Pepperdine

== Individual results ==
Rank	Player	Team	Score
1	Charles Warren^	Clemson	279 (−5)
2	Brad Elder	Texas	279 (−5)
T3	Jason Gore	Pepperdine	280 (−4)
T3	Keith Nolan	East Tennessee State	280 (−4)
5	Mike Walton	Pepperdine	281 (−3)

^ Warren won on the first playoff hole.

== Team results ==
=== Finalists ===
Rank	Team	Score
1	Pepperdine	1,148
2	Wake Forest	1,151
3	Clemson	1,153
4	Ohio State	1,154
T5	Arizona State (DC)	1,156
T5	Oklahoma State	1,156
T7	Northwestern	1,158
T7	TCU	1,158
9	Houston	1,160
10	North Carolina	1,167
11	New Mexico	1,169
12	East Tennessee State	1,170
13	Texas A&M	1,172
14	USC	1,173
15	Florida	1,175

=== Eliminated after 36 holes ===
Rank	Team	Score
T16	Arkansas	589
T16	Auburn	589
T18	LSU	590
T18	San José State	590
20	Texas	591
21	South Carolina	592
22	UNLV	593
T23	Drake	594
T23	Virginia	594
25	Michigan	597
T26	Arizona	598
T26	UCLA	598
28	Tennessee	599
29	Duke	605
30	Washington	617

- DC = Defending champions
- Debut appearance
