= Nebraska Cornhuskers men's golf =

University of Nebraska–Lincoln men's golf team

- Founded: 1935; 90 years ago
- University: University of Nebraska–Lincoln
- Conference: Big Ten
- Athletic director: Troy Dannen
- Head coach: Judd Cornell (4th season)
- Location: Lincoln, Nebraska
- Course: Firethorn Golf Course; Par: 71; Yards: 7102
- Nickname: Cornhuskers
- Colors: Scarlet and cream

NCAA Championship appearances
- 1973, 1978, 1998, 1999

Conference champions
- 1936, 1937

The Nebraska Cornhuskers men's golf team competes as part of NCAA Division I, representing the University of Nebraska–Lincoln in the Big Ten Conference. Nebraska primarily uses Firethorn Golf Course as its home course, but also lists ArborLinks Golf Club, Wilderness Ridge, and Hillcrest Country Club as affiliates.

The program was established in 1935 and has reached the NCAA Division I championship four times, most recently in 1999. Steve Friesen, the only men's golfer in the Nebraska Athletic Hall of Fame, won the 1999 Ben Hogan Award as the country's best golfer. The team has been coached by Judd Cornell since 2023.

== Conference affiliations ==
- MVIAA / Big Eight Conference (1935–1996) (Note: In 1928, the ten member schools of the Missouri Valley Intercollegiate Athletic Association agreed to a splintering of the conference – Iowa State, Kansas, Kansas State, Missouri, Nebraska, and Oklahoma retained the MVIAA name and Drake, Grinnell, Oklahoma A&M (now Oklahoma State), and Washington University formed the Missouri Valley Conference. The MVIAA became commonly known as the Big Six, and later the Big Seven and Big Eight. Its name was officially changed to the Big Eight in 1964.)
- Big 12 Conference (1997–2011)
- Big Ten Conference (2012–present)

== Coaches ==
=== Coaching history ===
| No. | Coach | Tenure |
|---|---|---|
| 1 | Dana X. Bible | 1935–1936 |
| 2 | Ed Newkirk | 1937–1941 |
| 3 | Bud Williamson | 1946–1948 |
| 4 | Marvin Franklin Jr. | 1949–1951 |
| 5 | Ed Higgenbotham | 1952 |
| 6 | Bob Hamblet | 1953–1954 |
| 7 | Jerry Bush | 1955–1957 |
| 8 | Bill Smith | 1958–1960 |
| 9 | Harry Good | 1961–1970 |
| 10 | Larry Romjue | 1971–2001 |
| 11 | Bill Spangler | 2002–2018 |
| 12 | Mark Hankins | 2019–2021 |
| 13 | Brett Balak | 2022 |
| 14 | Judd Cornell | 2023–present |

=== Coaching staff ===
| Name | Position | First year | Alma mater |
|---|---|---|---|
| Judd Cornell | Head coach | 2023 | Nebraska |
| Travis Minzel | Assistant coach | 2021 | Nebraska Wesleyan |

== Championships and awards ==
=== Team conference championships ===
- MVIAA: 1936, 1937

=== Individual awards ===
- Ben Hogan Award: Steve Friesen (1999)

== Seasons ==
Tournament champion

| Year (Note: Nebraska typically competes in multiple invitationals in the fall before playing the bulk of its schedule in spring, but references each season by the year of the NCAA Division I championship.) | Coach | Conference | Postseason (Note: The first NCAA Division I championship was held in 1939.) |
|---|---|---|---|
MVIAA / Big Eight Conference (1935–1996)
| 1935 | Dana X. Bible | 2nd | |
| 1936 | Dana X. Bible | 1st | |
| 1937 | Ed Newkirk | 1st | |
| 1938 | Ed Newkirk | 2nd | |
| 1939 | Ed Newkirk | 5th | |
| 1940 | Ed Newkirk | 4th | |
| 1941 | Ed Newkirk | 3rd | |
| 1942 | Did not compete (Note: Nebraska did not field a team from 1942 to 1945 due to World War II.) | | |
| 1943 | Did not compete | | |
| 1944 | Did not compete | | |
| 1945 | Did not compete | | |
| 1946 | Bud Williamson | 6th | |
| 1947 | Bud Williamson | 5th | |
| 1948 | Bud Williamson | 2nd | |
| 1949 | Marvin Franklin Jr. | 6th | |
| 1950 | Marvin Franklin Jr. | 3rd | |
| 1951 | Marvin Franklin Jr. | 2nd | |
| 1952 | Ed Higgenbotham | 2nd | |
| 1953 | Bob Hamblet | 4th | |
| 1954 | Bob Hamblet | 3rd | |
| 1955 | Jerry Bush | 5th | |
| 1956 | Jerry Bush | 5th | |
| 1957 | Jerry Bush | 6th | |
| 1958 | Bill Smith | 7th | |
| 1959 | Bill Smith | 6th | |
| 1960 | Bill Smith | 6th | |
| 1961 | Harry Good | 8th | |
| 1962 | Harry Good | 8th | |
| 1963 | Harry Good | 7th | |
| 1964 | Harry Good | 8th | |
| 1965 | Harry Good | 6th | |
| 1966 | Harry Good | 5th | |
| 1967 | Harry Good | 4th | |
| 1968 | Harry Good | 3rd | |
| 1969 | Harry Good | 8th | |
| 1970 | Harry Good | 3rd | |
| 1971 | Larry Romjue | 4th | |
| 1972 | Larry Romjue | 8th | |
| 1973 | Larry Romjue | 2nd | NCAA University Division 18th |
| 1974 | Larry Romjue | 3rd | |
| 1975 | Larry Romjue | 6th | |
| 1976 | Larry Romjue | 6th | |
| 1977 | Larry Romjue | 5th | |
| 1978 | Larry Romjue | 2nd | NCAA Division I 20th |
| 1979 | Larry Romjue | 4th | |
| 1980 | Larry Romjue | 5th | |
| 1981 | Larry Romjue | 3rd | |
| 1982 | Larry Romjue | 3rd | |
| 1983 | Larry Romjue | 4th | |
| 1984 | Larry Romjue | 7th | |
| 1985 | Larry Romjue | 3rd | |
| 1986 | Larry Romjue | 5th | |
| 1987 | Larry Romjue | 4th | |
| 1988 | Larry Romjue | 6th | |
| 1989 | Larry Romjue | 4th | |
| 1990 | Larry Romjue | 6th | |
| 1991 | Larry Romjue | 5th | |
| 1992 | Larry Romjue | 7th | |
| 1993 | Larry Romjue | 6th | |
| 1994 | Larry Romjue | 5th | |
| 1995 | Larry Romjue | 6th | |
| 1996 | Larry Romjue | 3rd | |
Big 12 Conference (1997–2011)
| 1997 | Larry Romjue | 6th | |
| 1998 | Larry Romjue | 9th | NCAA Division I 20th |
| 1999 | Larry Romjue | 2nd | NCAA Division I 14th |
| 1900 | Larry Romjue | 12th | |
| 2001 | Larry Romjue | 12th | |
| 2002 | Bill Spangler | 12th | |
| 2003 | Bill Spangler | 11th | |
| 2004 | Bill Spangler | 12th | |
| 2005 | Bill Spangler | 12th | |
| 2006 | Bill Spangler | 6th | |
| 2007 | Bill Spangler | 6th | |
| 2008 | Bill Spangler | 11th | |
| 2009 | Bill Spangler | 11th | |
| 2010 | Bill Spangler | T–7th | |
| 2011 | Bill Spangler | 8th | |
Big Ten Conference (2012–present)
| 2012 | Bill Spangler | 12th | |
| 2013 | Bill Spangler | 9th | |
| 2014 | Bill Spangler | 11th | |
| 2015 | Bill Spangler | 13th | |
| 2016 | Bill Spangler | 13th | |
| 2017 | Bill Spangler | 12th | |
| 2018 | Bill Spangler | 11th | |
| 2019 | Mark Hankins | 5th | |
| 2020 | Mark Hankins | Canceled due to the COVID-19 pandemic | |
| 2021 | Mark Hankins | 12th | |
| 2022 | Brett Balak | 14th | |
| 2023 | Judd Cornell | 12th | |
| 2024 | Judd Cornell | T–7th | |
| 2025 | Judd Cornell | 13th | |

== On the PGA Tour ==
Seven former Nebraska golfers have played on the PGA Tour. The longest-tenured was Tom Sieckmann, who spent thirteen years on the Tour and tied for eighth at the 1990 U.S. Open. Sieckmann lettered at NU in his freshman year but finished his collegiate career at national powerhouse Oklahoma State. Along with Steve Friesen, Scott Gutschewski led Nebraska to its most successful season ever in 1999 and turned professional shortly after, earning his PGA Tour card in 2005. After a decade mostly spent on the Korn Ferry Tour, Gutschewski reached the PGA Tour again in 2022.

Steve Gotsche and Mike Schuchart played multiple PGA Tour seasons, while three others (Mark Maness, Jeff Klein, and Brady Schnell) held their PGA Tour cards for a single year.
