= 1984 NCAA Division I men's golf championship =

1984 NCAA Division I Men's Golf Championship
Tournament information
- Location: Houston, Texas, U.S. 29.831580°N 95.641997°W
- Course: Bear Creek Golf World

Statistics
- Field: 32 teams

Champion
- Team: Houston (15th title); Individual: John Inman, North Carolina
- Team: 1,145; Individual: 271

Location map
- Location in the United States Location in Texas

The 1984 NCAA Division I Men's Golf Championships were contested at the 46th annual NCAA-sanctioned golf tournament for determining the individual and team national champions of men's collegiate golf at the Division I level in the United States.

The tournament was held at Bear Creek Golf World in Houston, Texas.

Houston won the team championship, the Cougars' then-record fifteenth NCAA title.

John Inman, from North Carolina, won the individual title with a record 271, 17-under-par, total.

== Individual results ==
=== Individual champion ===
- John Inman, North Carolina

== Team results ==
=== Finalists ===
Rank	Team	Score
1	Houston	1,145
2	Oklahoma State (DC)	1,146
3	Oklahoma	1,149
4	North Carolina	1,154
5	BYU	1,159
6	LSU	1,162
6	San José State	1,162
8	USC	1,163
9	Arizona State	1,164
10	Texas A&M	1,166
11	Florida	1,169
12	Georgia	1,170
12	South Carolina	1,170
14	Missouri	1,171
15	Wake Forest	1,176

=== Missed cut ===
Rank	Team	Score
16	Texas	878
17	Ohio State	879
18	Arkansas	880
19	Clemson	881
20	Ole Miss	883
21	UCLA	884
T22	Fresno State	886
T22	Houston Baptist	886
T24	Kent State	889
T24	San Diego State	889
T26	Stanford	890
T26	Weber State	890
T28	Colorado	895
T28	Illinois	895
30	Rutgers	912
31	Temple	914
32	Yale	920

- DC = Defending champions
- Debut appearance
