= 2002 NCAA Division I men's golf championship =

2002 NCAA Division I Men's Golf Championship
Tournament information
- Location: Columbus, Ohio, U.S. 40.031886°N 83.0523498°W
- Course: Ohio State University Golf Club

Statistics
- Field: 30 teams

Champion
- Team: Minnesota (1st title); Individual: Troy Matteson, Georgia Tech
- Team: 1,134; Individual: 276

Location map
- Location in the United States Location in Ohio

The 2002 NCAA Division I Men's Golf Championships were contested at the 64th annual NCAA-sanctioned golf tournament for determining the individual and team national champions of men's collegiate golf at the Division I level in the United States.

The tournament was held at the Ohio State University Golf Club in Columbus, Ohio.

Minnesota won the team championship, the Golden Gophers' first NCAA title.

Troy Matteson, from Georgia Tech, won the individual title.

== Qualifying ==
The NCAA held three regional qualifying tournaments, with the top ten teams from each event qualifying for the national championship.

Regional name	Golf course	Dates
East Regional	Ansley Golf Club's Settindown Creek; Roswell, Georgia	May 16–18, 2002
Central Regional	Pleasant Valley Country Club; Little Rock, Arkansas	May 16–18, 2002
West Regional	The Championship Course; Albuquerque, New Mexico	May 16–18, 2002

== Individual results ==
=== Individual champion ===
- Troy Matteson, Georgia Tech (276)

== Team results ==
Rank	Team	Score
1	Minnesota	1,134
2	Georgia Tech	1,138
T3	Clemson	1,142
T3	Texas	1,142
5	Augusta State	1,143
6	NC State	1,144
7	Purdue	1,145
8	Pepperdine	1,146
T9	Arizona	1,150
T9	Tulsa	1,150
T11	Florida (DC)	1,152
T11	TCU	1,152
T11	Washington	1,152
T4	Colorado	1,153
T4	Toledo	1,153
16	Oklahoma State	1,154
17	North Carolina	1,155
18	Illinois	1,158
19	Baylor	1,160
20	Virginia Tech	1,161
T21	Fresno State	1,162
T21	Georgia	1,162
23	UNLV	1,167
T24	Pacific	1,169
T24	Texas Tech	1,169
26	New Mexico	1,170
27	UAB	1,176
T28	Auburn	1,182
T28	Georgia Southern	1,182
30	VCU	1,191

- DC = Defending champions
- Debut appearance
