= 1999 NCAA Division I men's golf championship =

1999 NCAA Division I Men's Golf Championship
Tournament information
- Location: Chaska, Minnesota, U.S. 44.834°N 93.591°W
- Course: Hazeltine National Golf Club

Statistics
- Field: 30 teams

Champion
- Team: Georgia (1st title); Individual: Luke Donald, Northwestern
- Team: 1,180 (−3); Individual: 284

Location map
- Location in the United States Location in Minnesota

The 1999 NCAA Division I Men's Golf Championships were contested at the 61st annual NCAA-sanctioned golf tournament for determining the individual and team national champions of men's collegiate golf at the Division I level in the United States.

The tournament was held at the Hazeltine National Golf Club in Chaska, Minnesota from June 2 to 5, 1999.

Georgia won the team championship with a score of +28, the Bulldogs' first NCAA title. Second place was Oklahoma State with a score of +31 and third place was the University of Northwestern with a socre of +36.

Luke Donald, from Northwestern, won the individual title with a final score of 284, which was four under par. This was a seven shot victory over Ryuji Imada of Georgia.

Other future pros who played in this years championship included Paul Casey, Jeff Quinney, Charles Howell III, Lucas Glover, Adam Scott and Charley Hoffman.

== Qualifying ==
The NCAA held three regional qualifying tournaments, with the top ten teams from each event qualifying for the national championship.

Regional name	Golf course	Dates
East Regional	Rhode Island Country Club; Providence, Rhode Island	May 20–22, 1999
Central Regional	Ohio State University Golf Club; Columbus, Ohio	May 20–22, 1999
West Regional	Tucson National Resort; Tucson, Arizona	May 20–22, 1999

== Individual results ==
=== Individual champion ===
- Luke Donald, Northwestern (284)

== Team results ==
=== Finalists ===
Rank	Team	Score
1	Georgia	1,180
2	Oklahoma State	1,183
3	Northwestern	1,188
4	Washington	1,189
5	Arizona State	1,192
6	UNLV (DC)	1,195
7	BYU	1,196
T8	Clemson	1,199
T8	Houston	1,199
10	North Carolina	1,201
11	Minnesota	1,208
12	Florida	1,216
13	East Tennessee State	1,217
14	Nebraska	1,218
15	Illinois	1,219

=== Eliminated after 36 holes ===
Rank	Team	Score
T16	California	613
T16	Toledo	613
T18	Duke	614
T18	Oregon	614
T20	Arizona	615
T20	South Carolina	615
22	Kansas	616
23	Colorado	617
T24	Arkansas	618
T24	Colorado State	618
T24	Ole Miss	618
27	Augusta State	625
28	Georgia Tech	626
29	San Diego State	628
30	Richmond	642

- DC = Defending champions
- Debut appearance
