= 1990 NCAA Division I men's golf championship =

Golf tournament

1990 NCAA Division I Men's Golf Championship
Tournament information
- Dates: June 6–9, 1990
- Location: Tarpon Springs, Florida, U.S. 28.11389°N 82.75298°W
- Course: Innisbrook Resort and Golf Club (Island Course)

Statistics
- Par: 72
- Length: 6,999 yards (6,400 m)
- Field: 156 players, 30 teams

Champion
- Team: Arizona State (1st title); Individual: Phil Mickelson, Arizona State
- Team: 1,155 (+3); Individual: 279 (−9)

Location map
- Location in the United States Location in Florida

The 1990 NCAA Division I Men's Golf Championships were contested at the 52nd annual NCAA-sanctioned golf tournament for determining the individual and team national champions of men's collegiate golf at the Division I level in the United States.

The tournament was held at the Innisbrook Resort and Golf Club, Island Course in Tarpon Springs, Florida on June 6–9.

Arizona State won the team championship, the Sun Devils' first NCAA title.

Future professional, six-time major winner, and defending NCAA champion Phil Mickelson, from Arizona State, won the individual title, his second of three.

== Regional qualifiers ==
The regionals were played May 24–26.

Regional name	Golf course	Location	Qualified teams
East	Savannah Sheraton Resort and CC	Savannah, Georgia	Auburn, Florida State, Georgia Tech, Florida, Miami (FL), Georgia, Clemson, NC State, North Carolina, Duke, Central Florida
Central	Ohio State University Golf Club, Scarlet Course	Columbus, Ohio	Oklahoma State, Ohio State, Miami (OH), Kent State, Southwestern Louisiana, Oklahoma, Wisconsin, Texas, Rice, Arkansas
West	New Mexico State University Golf Course	Las Cruces, New Mexico	UNLV, UTEP, Arizona State, Arizona, USC, Fresno State, Oregon, Nevada, New Mexico

== Individual results ==
Rank	Player	Team	Score
1	Phil Mickelson	Arizona State	279 (−9)
2	Terry Miskell	Fresno State	283 (−5)
T3	John Karcher	Duke	284 (−4)
T3	Manny Zerman	Arizona	284 (−4)
5	Matthew Lane	Oklahoma	286 (−2)

== Team results ==
Rank	Team	Score
1	Arizona State	1,155
2	Florida	1,157
3	Arizona	1,159
4	Oklahoma State	1,163
T5	Fresno State	1,167
T5	Oklahoma (DC)	1,167
7	North Carolina	1,168
8	Florida State	1,169
9	Southwestern Louisiana	1,170
10	Ohio State	1,171
11	Georgia Tech	1,173
12	Clemson	1,174
13	USC	1,179
14	NC State	1,181
15	Georgia	1,183
16	UTEP	1,186
17	Duke	1,195
T18	Kent State	1,196
T18	UNLV	1,196
20	Rice	1,197
21	Central Florida	1,203
22	Texas	1,204
23	Oregon	1,206
24	Miami (OH)	1,207
T25	Auburn	1,208
T25	New Mexico	1,208
27	Miami (FL)	1,213
28	Nevada	1,220
29	Wisconsin	1,221
30	Arkansas	1,228

- DC = Defending champions
- Debut appearance
