= 1991 NCAA Division I men's golf championship =

Golf tournament

1991 NCAA Division I Men's Golf Championship
Tournament information
- Dates: June 5−8, 1991
- Location: Pebble Beach, California, U.S. 36.582368°N 121.938398°W
- Course: Poppy Hills Golf Course

Statistics
- Par: 72
- Length: 6,865 yards (6,277 m)
- Field: 156 players, 30 teams

Champion
- Team: Oklahoma State (7th title); Individual: Warren Schutte, UNLV
- Team: 1,161 (+9); Individual: 283 (−5)

Location map
- Location in the United States Location in California

The 1991 NCAA Division I Men's Golf Championships were contested at the 53rd annual NCAA-sanctioned golf tournament for determining the individual and team national champions of men's collegiate golf at the Division I level in the United States. The tournament was held at the Poppy Hills Golf Course in Pebble Beach, California on June 5−8.

Oklahoma State won the team championship, the Cowboys' seventh NCAA title and first since 1987.

Warren Schutte, from UNLV, won the individual title.

== Regional qualifiers ==
The regionals were played May 23–25.

Regional name	Golf course	Location	Qualified teams
East	Yale Golf Course	New Haven, Connecticut	Auburn, Florida State, Georgia Tech, Florida, Miami (FL), Georgia, Clemson, NC State, North Carolina, Duke, Central Florida
Central	Hillcrest Country Club	Bartlesville, Oklahoma	Georgia Tech, Georgia, Central Florida, Clemson, LSU, NC State, Wake Forest, North Carolina, Florida, Mississippi State, South Carolina
West	University of New Mexico; Championship Course	Albuquerque, New Mexico	Arizona, Arizona State, Stanford, UCLA, UNLV, UTEP, New Mexico, BYU, Southern California

== Individual results ==
Rank	Player	Team	Score
1	Warren Schutte	UNLV	283 (−5)
2	David Duval	Georgia Tech	286 (−2)
3	Franklin Langham	Georgia	287 (−1)
T4	Dave Bishop	UTEP	289 (+1)
T4	Craig Hainline	Oklahoma State	289 (+1)
T4	Phil Mickelson	Arizona State	289 (+1)
T4	Tom Scherrer	North Carolina	289 (+1)
T4	Manny Zerman	Arizona	289 (+1)

== Team results ==
Rank	Team	Score
1	Oklahoma State	1,161
2	North Carolina	1,168
3	Arizona State (DC)	1,175
4	Wake Forest	1,180
5	BYU	1,185
6	Georgia Tech	1,188
7	Southern California	1,190
8	UNLV	1,191
T9	Arkansas	1,192
T9	Texas	1,192
T9	UTEP	1,192
12	Central Florida	1,195
13	Clemson	1,196
14	NC State	1,197
T15	New Mexico	1,200
T15	South Carolina	1,200
T15	Stanford	1,200
T18	Arizona	1,201
T18	Northwestern	1,201
20	Florida	1,206
21	Oklahoma	1,207
22	Georgia	1,210
23	SMU	1,212
T24	Ohio State	1,215
T24	UCLA	1,215
26	TCU	1,216
27	Rice	1,218
28	Miami (OH)	1,225
29	Mississippi State	1,227
30	LSU	1,228

- DC = Defending champions
- Debut appearance
