= 1994 NCAA Division I men's golf championship =

Golf tournament

1994 NCAA Division I Men's Golf Championship
Tournament information
- Dates: June 1–4, 1994
- Location: McKinney, Texas, U.S. 33.195304°N 96.712830°W
- Course: Stonebridge Country Club

Statistics
- Par: 72
- Length: 7,000 yards (6,400 m)
- Field: 156 players, 30 teams

Champion
- Team: Stanford (7th title); Individual: Justin Leonard, Texas
- Team: 1,129 (−23); Individual: 271 (−17)

Location map
- Location in the United States Location in Texas

The 1994 NCAA Division I Men's Golf Championships were contested at the 55th annual NCAA-sanctioned golf tournament for determining the individual and team national champions of men's collegiate golf at the Division I level in the United States. The tournament was held at the Stonebridge Country Club in McKinney, Texas, a suburb of Dallas from June 1–4.

Stanford won the team championship, the Cardinal's seventh NCAA title and first since 1953. Future professional and one-time major winner Justin Leonard, from Texas, won the individual title.

== Regional qualifiers ==
The regionals were played May 19–21.

Regional name	Golf course	Location	Qualified teams
East	Grand National	Auburn, Alabama	Clemson, Florida, Georgia Tech, Wake Forest, East Tennessee State, North Carolina, LSU, Virginia Tech, Auburn, Florida State, Augusta State
Central	Oklahoma Golf and Country Club	Norman, Oklahoma	Texas, Colorado, Oklahoma State, Kent State, Arkansas, Oklahoma, Houston, SMU, TCU, Miami (OH)
West	Tucson National	Tucson, Arizona	UNLV, Arizona State, Fresno State, Arizona, Stanford, UC Santa Barbara, San José State, Oregon State, New Mexico

== Individual results ==
Rank	Player	Team	Score
1	Justin Leonard	Texas	271 (−17)
2	Alan Bratton	Oklahoma State	276 (−12)
T3	Mark Swygert	Clemson	277 (−11)
T3	William Yanagisawa	Texas	277 (−11)
T5	Notah Begay	Stanford	280 (−8)
T5	Stewart Cink	Gerogia Tech	280 (−8)

== Team results ==
=== Finalists ===
Rank	Team	Score
1	Stanford	1,129
2	Texas	1,133
3	Florida (DC)	1,136
4	Arkansas	1,138
5	Oklahoma State	1,140
6	Georgia Tech	1,145
T7	Auburn	1,149
T7	UNLV	1,149
T9	Arizona State	1,151
T9	Clemson	1,151
11	North Carolina	1,184
12	East Tennessee State	1,158
13	Kent State	1,160
14	Arizona	1,165
15	Wake Forest	1,167

=== Eliminated after 36 holes ===
Rank	Team	Score
16	Florida State	582
T17	Fresno State	585
T17	SMU	585
19	Houston	588
20	Virginia Tech	589
21	UC Santa Barbara	590
22	LSU	591
23	New Mexico	592
24	Colorado	593
25	Oregon State	594
26	San José State	595
27	TCU	596
T28	Miami (OH)	598
T28	Oklahoma	598
30	Augusta State	602

- DC = Defending champions
- Debut appearance
