= 1960 NCAA golf championship =

Golf tournament

1960 NCAA Golf Championship
Tournament information
- Location: Colorado Springs, Colorado, U.S. 38.7911°N 104.8502°W
- Course: The Broadmoor

Statistics
- Field: 34 teams

Champion
- Team: Houston (5th title); Individual: Dick Crawford, Houston

Location map
- Location in the United States Location in Colorado

The 1960 NCAA Golf Championship was the 22nd annual NCAA-sanctioned golf tournament to determine the individual and team national champions of men's collegiate golf in the United States.

The tournament was held at The Broadmoor in Colorado Springs, Colorado.

Four-time defending champions Houston won the team title, the Cougars' fifth NCAA team national title.

Houston's Dick Crawford also repeated as individual national champion.

== Individual results ==
=== Individual champion ===
- Dick Crawford, Houston

=== Tournament medalists ===
- Gene Francis, Purdue (143)

== Team results ==
Rank	Team	Score
1	Houston (DC)	603
T2	Oklahoma State	607
T2	Purdue	607
T4	Florida	611
T4	North Carolina	611
6	Texas A&M	612
7	Arizona	617
8	USC	618
T9	Baylor	619
T9	Iowa	619

- Note: Top 10 only
- DC = Defending champions
