= 2004 NCAA Division I men's golf championship =

NCAA men's golf championship

2004 NCAA Division I Men's Golf Championship
Tournament information
- Location: Hot Springs, Virginia, U.S. 37.995472°N 79.829644°W
- Course: The Homestead

Statistics
- Field: 30 teams

Champion
- Team: California (1st title); Individual: Ryan Moore, UNLV
- Team: 1,134; Individual: 267

Location map
- Location in the United States Location in Virginia

The 2004 NCAA Division I Men's Golf Championships were contested at the 66th annual NCAA-sanctioned golf tournament for determining the individual and team national champions of men's collegiate golf at the Division I level in the United States.

The tournament was held at The Homestead in Hot Springs, Virginia.

California won the team championship, the Golden Bears' first NCAA title.

Ryan Moore, from the University of Nevada Las Vegas, won the individual title.

== Qualifying ==
The NCAA held three regional qualifying tournaments, with the top ten teams from each event qualifying for the national championship.

Regional name	Golf course	Dates
East Regional	Yale Golf Club; New Haven, Connecticut	May 20–22, 2004
Central Regional	Birck Boilermaker Golf Complex; West Lafayette, Indiana	May 20–22, 2004
West Regional	Sunriver Resort; Sunriver, Oregon	May 20–22, 2004

== Individual results ==
=== Individual champion ===
- Ryan Moore, UNLV (267)

== Team results ==
Rank	Team	Score
1	California	1,134
2	UCLA	1,140
3	Arizona	1,148
4	Texas	1,149
5	Georgia Tech	1,151
T6	Florida	1,152
T6	Washington	1,152
8	Kentucky	1,155
9	BYU	1,156
10	Pepperdine	1,160
T11	Georgia	1,161
T11	Georgia State	1,161
13	Oklahoma State	1,164
14	Texas A&M	1,167
15	Penn State	1,170

=== Eliminated after 54 holes ===
Rank	Team	Score
T16	Purdue	871
T16	USC	871
18	Clemson	872
19	New Mexico	876
20	TCU	877
T21	Arizona State	879
T21	Auburn	879
T21	Oklahoma	879
24	Kent State	881
25	Toledo	884
T24	SMU	887
T24	Wichita State	887
28	Vanderbilt	891
29	North Carolina	892
30	Rhode Island	912

- DC = Defending champions
- Debut appearance
