= 1988 NCAA Division I men's golf championship =

1988 NCAA Division I Men's Golf Championship
Tournament information
- Location: Thousand Oaks, California, U.S. 34.194635°N 118.808335°W
- Course: North Ranch Country Club

Statistics
- Field: 32 teams

Champion
- Team: UCLA (1st title); Individual: E.J. Pfister, Oklahoma State
- Team: 1,176 (−3); Individual: 284

Location map
- Location in the United States Location in California

The 1988 NCAA Division I Men's Golf Championships were contested at the 50th annual NCAA-sanctioned golf tournament for determining the individual and team national champions of men's collegiate golf at the Division I level in the United States.

The tournament was held at the North Ranch Country Club in Thousand Oaks, California.

UCLA won the team championship, the Bruins' first NCAA title.

E.J. Pfister, from Oklahoma State, won the individual title, the third consecutive win for an OSU golfer.

== Individual results ==
=== Individual champion ===
- E. J. Pfister, Oklahoma State (284)

== Team results ==
=== Finalists ===
Rank	Team	Score
1	UCLA	1,176
T2	Oklahoma	1,179
T2	Oklahoma State (DC)	1,179
T2	UTEP	1,179
5	Florida	1,180
6	Arizona	1,183
7	Georgia Tech	1,184
T8	Georgia	1,186
T8	South Carolina	1,186
10	Arizona State	1,188
11	Texas	1,189
12	Arkansas	1,190
13	USC	1,194
14	Georgia Southern	1,204
15	Washington	1,211

=== Eliminated after 54 holes ===
Rank	Team	Score
16	Houston Baptist	900
17	Clemson	903
18	New Mexico	906
18	NC State	906
20	LSU	907
21	Kentucky	909

=== Eliminated after 36 holes ===
Rank	Team	Score
22	Wake Forest	608
T23	Illinois	609
T23	Ohio State	609
25	Tulsa	610
26	Virginia	614
27	SMU	616
28	Memphis	622
29	Utah	623
30	Hartford	626
31	Temple	635
32	St. John's (NY)	638

- DC = Defending champions
- Debut appearance
