= 1978 NCAA Division I golf championship =

1978 NCAA Division I Golf Championship
Tournament information
- Location: Eugene, Oregon, U.S. 44.064°N 123.087°W
- Course: Eugene Country Club

Statistics
- Field: 21 teams

Champion
- Team: Oklahoma State (2nd title); Individual: David Edwards, Oklahoma State

Location map
- Location in the United States Location in Oregon

The 1978 NCAA Division I Golf Championship was the 40th annual NCAA-sanctioned golf tournament to determine the individual and team national champions of men's collegiate golf at the University Division level in the United States.

The tournament was held at the Eugene Country Club in Eugene, Oregon.

Oklahoma State won the team championship, the Cowboys' second NCAA title.

David Edwards, also from Oklahoma State, won the individual title.

== Individual results ==
=== Individual champion ===
- David Edwards, Oklahoma State

== Team results ==
Rank	Team	Score
1	Oklahoma State	1,140
2	Georgia	1,157
3	Arizona State	1,160
4	BYU	1,166
5	North Carolina	1,174
6	Oral Roberts	1,176
7	Wake Forest	1,177
8	San Jose State	1,181
9	Florida	1,182
10	UCLA	1,186
11	Oregon	1,188
12	San Diego State	1,190
13	USC	1,193
14	Stanford	1,196
T15	Texas A&M	1,199
T15	Weber State	1,199
17	South Carolina	1,201
18	Houston (DC)	1,202
19	Wichita State	1,204
20	Ohio State	1,206
21	Nebraska	1,208

- DC = Defending champions
- Debut appearance
