= 1993 NCAA Division I men's golf championship =

Golf tournament

1993 NCAA Division I Men's Golf Championship
Tournament information
- Dates: June 2–5, 1993
- Location: Lexington, Kentucky, U.S. 37.973484°N 84.634028°W
- Course: The Champion Trace Course at Keene Trace Golf Club

Statistics
- Par: 72
- Length: 7,064 yards (6,459 m)
- Field: 156 players, 30 teams

Champion
- Team: Florida (3rd title); Individual: Todd Demsey, Arizona State
- Team: 1,145 (−7); Individual: 278 (−10)
- Location in the United States Location in Kentucky

The 1993 NCAA Division I Men's Golf Championships were contested at the 54th annual NCAA-sanctioned golf tournament for determining the individual and team national champions of men's collegiate golf at the Division I level in the United States. The tournament was held at The Champion Trace Course at Keene Trace Golf Club in Lexington, Kentucky from June 2–5.

Florida won the team championship, the Gators' third NCAA title and first since 1973. Florida bested second-placed Georgia Tech by a single stroke (1,145–1,146).

Future professional Todd Demsey, from Arizona State, won the individual title, the fourth win in five championships for a Sun Devil golfer.

== Regional qualifiers ==
The regionals were played May 19–21.

Regional name	Golf course	Location	Qualified teams
East	Birdwood Golf Course	Charlottesville, Virginia	Clemson, North Carolina, Augusta State, Florida, Georgia Tech, Auburn, Alabama, Duke, LSU, NC State, Wake Forest
Central	Ohio State University Golf Club, Scarlet Course	Columbus, Ohio	Kent State, Texas, Oklahoma State, Oklahoma, Minnesota, Arkansas, Michigan State, Southwestern Louisiana, Ohio State, Kansas
West	Rivereside Country Club	Provo, Utah	Arizona, Arizona State, BYU, UNLV, New Mexico State, Fresno State, Pepperdine, New Mexico, UCLA

== Individual results ==
Rank	Player	Team	Score
1	Todd Demsey	Arizona State	278 (−10)
2	David Duval	Georgia Tech	279 (−9)
T3	Thump Delk	Clemson	287 (−1)
T3	Jean-Paul Hebert	Texas	287 (−1)
T3	Guy Hill	Florida	287 (−1)
T3	Chris Riley	UNLV	287 (−1)

== Team results ==
=== Finalists ===
Rank	Team	Score
1	Florida	1,145
2	Georgia Tech	1,146
3	North Carolina	1,147
4	Clemson	1,153
5	Texas	1,156
6	Arizona State	1,162
7	Arkansas	1,169
8	UNLV	1,176
9	Oklahoma	1,177
10	Duke	1,179
11	Wake Forest	1,184
12	Oklahoma State	1,188
13	Augusta State	1,189
14	Southwestern Louisiana	1,190
15	Kansas	1,200

=== Eliminated after 36 holes ===
Rank	Team	Score
16	Arizona (DC)	595
T17	Auburn	597
T17	LSU	597
T17	UCLA	597
T20	Minnesota	598
T20	Ohio State	598
T22	Fresno State	599
T22	NC State	599
24	New Mexico	601
25	BYU	605
26	New Mexico State	613
T27	Kent State	616
T27	Michigan State	616
29	Alabama	620
30	Pepperdine	621

- DC = Defending champions
- Debut appearance
