= 2006 NCAA Division I men's golf championship =

2006 NCAA Division I Men's Golf Championship
Tournament information
- Dates: May 31 – June 3, 2006
- Location: Sunriver, Oregon, U.S. 43.853°N 121.447°W
- Course: Crosswater Club

Statistics
- Par: 72
- Field: 156 players 30 teams
- Cut: 215 (individual); 875 (team)

Champion
- Team: Oklahoma State; Individual: Jonathan Moore, Oklahoma State
- Team: 1,143 (−9); Individual: 276 (−12)

Location map
- Location in the United States Location in Oregon

The 2006 NCAA Division I Men's Golf Championship was a golf tournament contested from May 31 to June 3, 2006, at the Crosswater Club in Sunriver, Oregon. It was the 68th NCAA Division I Men's Golf Championship. The team championship was won by the Oklahoma State Cowboys who captured their tenth national championship (and first since 2000) by three strokes over the Florida Gators. The individual national championship was won by Jonathan Moore, also from Oklahoma State.

== Venue ==
This was the first NCAA Division I Men's Golf Championship hosted at the Crosswater Club in Sunriver, Oregon.
