= 1987 NCAA Division I men's golf championship =

1987 NCAA Division I Men's Golf Championship
Tournament information
- Location: Columbus, Ohio, U.S. 40.031886°N 83.0523498°W
- Course: Ohio State University Golf Club

Statistics
- Field: 33 teams

Champion
- Team: Oklahoma State (6th title); Individual: Brian Watts, Oklahoma State
- Team: 1,160 (−16); Individual: 280

Location map
- Location in the United States Location in Ohio

The 1987 NCAA Division I Men's Golf Championships were contested at the 49th annual NCAA-sanctioned golf tournament for determining the individual and team national champions of men's collegiate golf at the Division I level in the United States.

The tournament was held at the Ohio State University Golf Club in Columbus, Ohio.

Oklahoma State won the team championship, the Cowboys' sixth NCAA title and first since 1983.

Future professional Brian Watts, also from Oklahoma State, won the individual title.

== Individual results ==
=== Individual champion ===
- Brian Watts, Oklahoma State (280)

== Team results ==
=== Finalists ===
Rank	Team	Score
1	Oklahoma State	1,160
2	Wake Forest (DC)	1,176
3	Oklahoma	1,177
4	Ohio State	1,185
5	Houston Baptist	1,186
6	Arkansas	1,187
7	Florida State	1,191
8	North Carolina	1,194
9	Fresno State	1,195
10	Houston	1,196
11	Clemson	1,197
T12	San José State	1,199
T12	UTEP	1,199
T14	BYU	1,200
T14	LSU	1,200
16	Arizona State	1,202
17	South Florida	1,204
18	Arizona	1,208
19	Texas A&M	1,209
20	Texas	1,210
21	UCLA	1,213
22	Georgia Tech	1,214

=== Missed cut ===
Rank	Team	Score
23	USC	916
24	Georgia	918
T25	Hartford	919
T25	Kent State	919
T25	Kentucky	919
28	New Mexico	921
29	Florida	925
30	Oregon	926
31	Penn State	942
32	Tulsa	946
33	Temple	947

- DC = Defending champions
- Debut appearance
