= 1996 NCAA Division I men's golf championship =

Golf tournament

1996 NCAA Division I Men's Golf Championship
Tournament information
- Dates: May 29 – June 1, 1996
- Location: Ooltewah, Tennessee, U.S. 35.0867°N 85.0446°W
- Course: Honors Course

Statistics
- Par: 72
- Length: 7,039 yards (6,436 m)
- Field: 156 players 30 teams

Champion
- Team: Arizona State; Individual: Tiger Woods (Stanford)
- Team: 1,186 (+34); Individual: 285 (−3)

Location map
- Location in the United States Location in Tennessee

The 1996 NCAA Division I Men's Golf Championship was the 58th annual NCAA Division I Men's Golf Championship to determine the individual and team national champions of men's collegiate golf. The tournament was held at the Honors Course in Ooltewah, Tennessee from May 29 to June 1, 1996.

The team championship was won by the Arizona State Sun Devils who captured their second national championship by three strokes over the UNLV Rebels. The individual national championship was won by Tiger Woods from Stanford.

== Venue ==
This was the first NCAA Division I men's golf championship hosted at the Honors Course in Ooltewah, Tennessee. The tournament would be played at Ooltewah again in 2010. This was the fourth NCAA golf championship played in Tennessee; the others were in 1934 (at the Cleveland Country Club in Cleveland, Tennessee), 1955 (at the Holston Hills Country Club in Knoxville, Tennessee), and 1965 (again in Knoxville).

== Regional qualifiers ==
The regionals were played May 16–18.

Regional name	Golf course	Location	Qualified teams
East	Concord Resort, Monster Course	Kiamesha Lake, New York	NC State, Florida, Florida State, North Carolina, Wake Forest, South Carolina, East Tennessee State, Clemson, Alabama, Penn State, Tennessee
Central	University of Michigan; Golf Course	Ann Arbor, Michigan	Texas A&M, SMU, Arkansas, Kansas, Texas, Indiana, Oklahoma State, Miami (OH), TCU, Oklahoma
West	Stanford University; Golf Course	Stanford, California	Stanford, Arizona State, UNLV, Pepperdine, Southern California, Arizona, New Mexico, San Jose State, Pacific

== Results ==
=== Team championship ===
Rank	Team	Round totals	To par
1	Arizona State	286-300-295-305=1,186	+34
2	UNLV	291-296-299-303=1,189	+37
3	East Tennessee State	303-294-301-305=1,204	+52
4	Stanford	292-304-303-306=1,205	+53
5	Arizona	303-301-297-306=1,207	+55
T6	Florida	296-300-312-304=1,212	+60
T6	New Mexico	300-304-302-306=1,212	+60
8	Oklahoma State	298-308-299-310=1,215	+63
9	Southern California	303-296-303-314=1,216	+64
10	San Jose State	302-300-303-315=1,220	+68

Other finishers: Arkansas (1,221), SMU (1,222), Texas (1,224), Clemson (1,227), Kansas (1,248)
Eliminated at 36-hole cut: North Carolina (608), NC State (610), TCU (612), Wake Forest (612), Pacific (621), Texas A&M (614), South Carolina (616), Tennessee (617), Pepperdine (618), Miami (OH) (622), Oklahoma (622), Florida State (623), Alabama (627), Penn State (630), Indiana (636)

=== Individual championship ===
Rank	Player	School	Round totals	To par
1	Tiger Woods	Stanford	69-67-69-80=285	−3
2	Rory Sabbatini	Arizona	70-70-74-75=289	+1
T3	Darren Angel	Arizona State	72-74-69-76=291	+3
T3	Mike Ruiz	UNLV	71-74-74-72=291	+3
T5	Tim Clark	NC State	70-77-71-74=292	+4
T5	Brad Elder	Texas	71-68-76-77=292	+4
7	Lewis Chitengwa	Virginia	77-72-68-76=293	+5
8	Rob McMillan	New Mexico	75-71-75-73=294	+6
T9	Joey Maxon	Clemson	74-70-73-78=295	+7
T9	Keith Nolan	East Tennessee State	76-71-76-72=295	+7
T9	Arron Oberholser	San Jose State	73-74-71-77=295	+7
T9	Ted Oh	UNLV	72-74-70-79=295	+7
T9	Steve Scott	Florida	75-73-77-70=295	+7
