= 1995 NCAA Division I men's golf championship =

Golf tournament

1995 NCAA Division I Men's Golf Championship
Tournament information
- Dates: May 31 – June 3, 1995
- Location: Columbus, Ohio, U.S. 40.031886°N 83.0523498°W
- Courses: Ohio State University Golf Club, Scarlet course

Statistics
- Par: 72
- Length: 7,109 yards (6,500 m)
- Field: 156 players, 30 teams

Champion
- Team: Oklahoma State (8th title); Individual: Chip Spratlin, Auburn
- Team: 1,156 (+4); Individual: 283 (−5)

Location map
- Location in the United States Location in Ohio

The 1995 NCAA Division I Men's Golf Championships were contested at the 56th annual NCAA-sanctioned golf tournament for determining the individual and team national champions of men's collegiate golf at the Division I level in the United States. The tournament was held at the Ohio State University Golf Club (Scarlet course) in Columbus, Ohio from May 31 – June 3.

Oklahoma State won the team championship, the Cowboys' eighth NCAA title and first since 1991. Oklahoma State defeated defending champions Stanford in a playoff after the two teams finished tied atop the team standings at 1,156. Chip Spratlin, from Auburn, won the individual title.

== Regional qualifiers ==
The regionals were played May 18–20.

Regional name	Golf course	Location	Qualified teams
East	Yale Golf Course	New Haven, Connecticut	Clemson, North Carolina, NC State, Florida, Wake Forest, Florida State, East Tennessee State, Georgia Tech, Tennessee, Auburn, Augusta State
Central	Bentwater Country Club	Montgomery, Texas	Oklahoma, Oklahoma State, Kent State, Texas, Tulsa, Houston, Iowa, Ohio State, Kansas, TCU
West	University of New Mexico, Championship Course	Albuquerque, New Mexico	Arizona State, New Mexico, New Mexico State, Arizona, UNLV, Stanford, UTEP, California, Southern California

== Individual results ==
Rank	Player	Team	Score
1	Chris Spratlin	Auburn	283 (−5)
T2	Ted Purdy	Arizona	284 (−4)
T2	Chris Tidland	Oklahoma State	
4	Chris Wollmann	Ohio State	285 (−3)
T5	Joey Snyder	Arizona State	286 (−2)
T5	Tiger Woods	Stanford	286 (−2)
T5	Chad Wright	Southern California	286 (−2)

== Team results ==
=== Finalists ===
Rank	Team	Score
1	Oklahoma State	1,156
2	Stanford (DC)	1,156
3	Texas	1,157
4	Arizona State	1,164
5	Southern California	1,165
6	California	1,166
7	Florida State	1,168
T8	NC State	1,170
T8	Ohio State	1,170
10	Arizona	1,171
11	Tulsa	1,176
12	New Mexico	1,182
13	Florida	1,184
14	Houston	1,186
15	UNLV	1,187

=== Eliminated after 36 holes ===
Rank	Team	Score
T16	Auburn	592
T16	Kansas	592
T16	Tennessee	592
19	North Carolina	593
20	Clemson	594
21	TCU	595
T22	Oklahoma	596
T22	Wake Forest	596
24	Augusta State	598
25	East Tennessee State	599
26	Iowa	600
27	Kent State	603
28	New Mexico State	605
29	Georgia Tech	606
30	UTEP	608

- DC = Defending champions
- Debut appearance
