= 2003 NCAA Division I men's golf championship =

Coordinates: 36°06′09″N 97°11′07″W

2003 NCAA Division I Men's Golf Championship
Tournament information
- Dates: May 27–30, 2003
- Location: Stillwater, Oklahoma, U.S.
- Course(s): Karsten Creek Golf Course

Statistics
- Par: 72
- Field: 156 players, 30 teams

Champion
- Team: Clemson; Individual: Alejandro Cañizares, Arizona State
- Team: 1,191 (+39); Individual: 287 (−1)

The 2003 NCAA Division I Men's Golf Championship was a golf tournament contested May 27–30, 2003, at the Karsten Creek Golf Course in Stillwater, Oklahoma. It was the 65th NCAA Division I Men's Golf Championship. The team championship was won by the Clemson Tigers, their first, who won by two strokes over the Oklahoma State Cowboys. The individual national championship was won by Alejandro Cañizares from Arizona State.

== Regional qualifying tournaments ==
Three regional qualifying tournaments were held May 15–17. The ten teams with the lowest team scores from each regional qualified for both the team and individual national championships. The top two individuals in each regional whose teams did not qualify also qualified for the individual national championship.

Regional name	Golf course	Location	Qualified teams
East Regional	Auburn University Club	Auburn, Alabama	Clemson, Georgia Tech, Florida, Tennessee, Duke, Wake Forest, Augusta State, South Carolina, Vanderbilt, Auburn
Central Regional	Colbert Hills Golf Course	Manhattan, Kansas	Oklahoma State, Illinois, North Carolina State, North Carolina, Texas, Kentucky, Southern Methodist, Minnesota, Arkansas, Wichita State
West Regional	Washington National Golf Club	Auburn, Washington	UCLA, Arizona, UNLV, Georgia, Arizona State, New Mexico, Washington, USC, Oregon, San Diego State

== Venue ==
This was the first NCAA Division I Men's Golf Championship held at Karsten Creek in Stillwater, Oklahoma. The course would also host the 2011 championship.

== Team competition ==
- Par, single-round: 288
- Par, total: 1,152

Place	Team	Round 1	Round 2	Round 3	Round 4	Total (To par)
1	Clemson	299	302	287	303	1191 (+39)
2	Oklahoma State	299	300	290	304	1193 (+41)
3	UCLA	303	295	301	298	1197 (+45)
T4	Wake Forest	304	306	290	298	1198 (+46)
T4	Florida	302	300	297	299	1198 (+46)
6	Arizona State	306	308	297	291	1202 (+50)
7	Augusta State	311	306	294	301	1212 (+60)
8	Auburn	299	303	301	312	1215 (+63)
T9	North Carolina	308	308	299	301	1216 (+64)
T9	Texas	306	314	299	297	1216 (+64)
T11	Georgia Tech	310	306	302	300	1218 (+66)
T11	Washington	314	300	301	303	1218 (+66)
13	UNLV	313	300	295	312	1220 (+68)
14	USC	300	311	298	313	1222 (+70)
15	NC State	299	317	296	312	1224 (+72)
16	Georgia	315	306	297	308	1226 (+74)
17	Arizona	307	308	303	311	1229 (+77)
18	Wichita State	308	309	299	316	1232 (+80)

- Eliminated after 54 holes: Duke (920), Minnesota (920), Illinois (921), Oregon (924), Tennessee (925), New Mexico (928), Vanderbilt (930), Kentucky (942), Arkansas (947), SMU (953), South Carolina (955), San Diego State (965)

== Individual competition ==
- Par, single-round: 72
- Par, total: 288

Place	Player	School	Score	To par
1	Alejandro Cañizares	Arizona State	77-70-71-69=287	−1
2	Lee Williams	Auburn	69-72-71-77=289	+1
T3	Matthew Rosenfeld	Texas	71-76-71-72=290	+2
T3	Chris Stroud	Lamar	70-77-70-73=290	+2
5	Brock Mackenzie	Washington	77-71-72-71=291	+3
T6	Ricky Barnes	Arizona	75-74-70-73=292	+4
T6	Jason Hartwick	Texas	77-70-72-73=292	+4
8	Hunter Mahan	Oklahoma State	73-71-73-76=293	+5
9	Chez Reavie	Arizona State	74-77-70-73=294	+6
T10	Andrew Dahl	Arkansas	73-81-71-71=295	+7
T10	Jason Moon	NC State	72-73-75-75=295	+7
