= Honors Course =

Golf course in Tennessee, United States

- Interactive map of Honors Course
- 35.0867°N 85.0446°W

Club information
- Location: near Ooltewah, Tennessee, U.S.
- Established: 1983
- Type: Private
- Total holes: 18
- Tournaments: 1991 U.S. Amateur; 1994 Curtis Cup; 1996 NCAA Div. I C'ship; 2005 U.S. Mid-Amateur; 2010 NCAA Div. I C'ship; 2026 U.S. Women's Amateur
- Website: www.honorscourse.net/Home.aspx
- Designed by: Pete Dye
- Par: 72
- Length: 7,400 yards

The Honors Course is a privately owned golf course located near Ooltewah, Tennessee, just north of Chattanooga. The club was founded by Coca-Cola bottling heir Jack Lupton and designed by Pete Dye in 1983. It has been the number one ranked course in the state, number twenty-eight on Golf Digest's list of the top one-hundred golf courses in America, and has been the site of amateur tournaments as the U.S. Amateur, U.S. Mid-Amateur, NCAA Championships, and U.S. Junior Championship. Jack Lupton's main idea in founding The Honors Course was to create a place to honor amateur golf and amateur golfers. The course is located in an unincorporated area of Hamilton County, Tennessee, just north of the unincorporated community of Ooltewah.

== Tournaments Hosted ==
=== 1991 U.S. Amateur ===
The U.S. Amateur was the first major event held at The Honors Course. A California native, Mitch Voges, won the tournament in convincing fashion—beating his opponent in the final match 7 and 6. His road to the trophy included a few miraculous shots including a holed approach shot and a birdie putt from forty feet.

=== 1994 Curtis Cup ===
The 28th Curtis Cup was held July 30-31. Great Britain & Ireland and USA ended up tied at 9. Since Great Britain & Ireland were the defending champions, they retained the cup.

=== NCAA Championships ===
Two separate NCAA Championships have been hosted at the course. The first, in 1996, was won by Arizona State University. Its individual title makes this one of the most famous NCAA Championships of all time. The trophy was won by a young Tiger Woods, who dominated the field so much in the first days that he finished with a final round 80 and was still able to win by four.

In its second time being hosted at the Honors Course, the team title was claimed by a huge underdog—the Augusta State Jaguars, who took down the number one-ranked Oklahoma State Cowboys. Scott Langley of Illinois won the individual crown.

=== U.S. Mid-Amateur ===
In 2005, the 25th U.S. Mid-Amateur was held at The Honors Course. The final match of the tournament came down to Kevin Marsh and Carlton Forrester and Marsh won without much of a fight from Forrester. The 32-year-old Las Vegas native won the final match 10 and 9 to take the mid-am title.

=== U.S. Women's Amateur ===
In 2026, the 126th U.S. Women's Amateur was held at The Honors Course. The week saw inclement weather suspend play on five consecutive days, but in the end, Asterisk Talley won 8 & 6 in the final match over stroke play medalist Anna Iwanaga of Japan to win her second USGA Championship.

== Honoring Amateur Golf ==
=== Amateur Creed ===
Jack Lupton founded the course with this idea in mind: "The work that I have done has been for amateur sport, and I hope you won’t mind if I leave you with my creed of amateurism. Amateurism, after all, must be the backbone of all sport -- golf or otherwise. In my mind an amateur is one who competes for the joy of playing, for the companionship it affords, for health-giving exercise, and for relaxation from more serious matters. As part of this light-hearted approach to the game, he cheerfully accepts all adverse breaks, is considerate of his opponent, plays the game fairly and squarely in accordance of its rules, maintains self-control, and strives to do his best, not in order to win, but rather as a test of his own skill and ability. These are his only interests, and, in them material considerations have no part. The return which amateur sport will bring to those who play it in this spirit are greater than those any money can possibly buy."

=== Honors Circle ===
Lupton also wanted to honor amateur golfers that have had great success so he created the honors circle. Each hole is named after a golfer and tells of their successes and accolades within amateur golf. Recipients of this honor range from college players to Senior Amateur champions and have been both men and women.
