= 2011 NCAA Division I men's golf championship =

Coordinates: 36°06′09″N 97°11′07″W

2011 NCAA Division I Men's Golf Championship
Tournament information
- Dates: May 31 – June 5, 2011
- Location: Stillwater, Oklahoma, U.S.
- Course(s): Karsten Creek Golf Club

Statistics
- Par: 72
- Field: 156 players, 30 teams

Champion
- Team: Augusta State; Individual: John Peterson, LSU
- Team: 3–2 (def. Georgia); Individual: 211 (−5)

The 2011 NCAA Division I Men's Golf Championship was a golf tournament contested from May 31 to June 5, 2011 at the Karsten Creek Golf Club in Stillwater, Oklahoma and was hosted by Oklahoma State University. It was the 73rd NCAA Division I Men's Golf Championship. The team championship was won by the Augusta State Jaguars who won their second consecutive national championship by defeating the Georgia Bulldogs in the championship match play round 3–2. The individual national championship was won by John Peterson from Louisiana State University.

== Venue ==
This was the second NCAA Division I Men's Golf Championship, and the first since 2003, held at the Karsten Creek Golf Club in Stillwater, Oklahoma. It was the third NCAA tournament hosted by Oklahoma State University in 1973, 2003, 2011.

== Team competition ==
=== Leaderboard ===
- Par, single-round: 288
- Par, total: 864

The top eight teams advanced to the match play portion of the tournament.

Place	Team	Round 1	Round 2	Round 3	Total (To par)
1	UCLA	286	288	298	872 (+8)
2	Georgia Tech	283	290	302	875 (+11)
T3	Oklahoma State	292	293	294	879 (+15)
T3	Illinois	291	287	301	879 (+15)
5	Georgia	291	288	305	884 (+20)
6	Ohio State	291	299	297	887 (+23)
7	Augusta State	294	294	300	888 (+24)
8	Duke	303	293	293	889 (+25)
9	Texas A&M	289	301	300	890 (+26)
T10	Iowa	304	292	296	892 (+28)
T10	Michigan	307	292	293	892 (+28)

- Rest of the Field: USC (895), Texas (895), Alabama (896), Arkansas (897), San Diego (898), San Diego State (898), Arizona State (899), California (902), Kent State (902), LSU (905), Northwestern (906), Florida (908), Tennessee (910), Pepperdine (919), Kennesaw State (921), NC State (921), Oklahoma (930), Arizona (933), Colorado State (937)

=== Match play bracket ===
Quarterfinal; June 3
1	UCLA	1
8	Duke	3
4	Illinois	1
5	Georgia	3
3	Oklahoma State	3
6	Ohio State	1
2	Georgia Tech	2
7	Augusta State	3

Semifinal; June 4
8	Duke	2
5	Georgia	3
3	Oklahoma State	2
7	Augusta State	3

Final; June 5
5	Georgia	2
7	Augusta State	3
