= 1980 NCAA Division I golf championship =

1980 NCAA Division I Golf Championship
Tournament information
- Location: Columbus, Ohio, U.S. 40.031886°N 83.0523498°W
- Course: Ohio State University Golf Club

Statistics
- Field: 30 teams

Champion
- Team: Oklahoma State (3rd title); Individual: Jay Don Blake, Utah State

Location map
- Location in the United States Location in Ohio

The 1980 NCAA Division I Golf Championship was the 42nd annual NCAA-sanctioned golf tournament to determine the individual and team national champions of men's collegiate golf at the Division I level in the United States.

The tournament was held at the Ohio State University Golf Club in Columbus, Ohio.

Oklahoma State won the team championship, the Cowboys' third NCAA title and first since 1981.

Jay Don Blake, from Utah State, won the individual title.

== Individual results ==
=== Individual champion ===
- Jay Don Blake, Utah State

== See also ==
- NAIA Men's Golf Championship
