= 2000 NCAA Division I men's golf championship =

2000 NCAA Division I Men's Golf Championship
Tournament information
- Location: Opelika, Alabama, U.S. 32.675468°N 85.426394°W
- Course: Grand National

Statistics
- Field: 30 teams

Champion
- Team: Oklahoma State (9th title); Individual: Charles Howell III, Oklahoma State
- Team: 1,116; Individual: 265

Location map
- Location in the United States Location in Alabama

The 2000 NCAA Division I Men's Golf Championships were contested at the 62nd annual NCAA-sanctioned golf tournament for determining the individual and team national champions of men's collegiate golf at the Division I level in the United States.

The tournament was held at the Grand National in Opelika, Alabama.

Oklahoma State won the team championship, the Cowboys' ninth NCAA title and first since 1995. Oklahoma State defeated Georgia Tech in a play-off after the two teams finished tied atop the team standings.

Charles Howell III, also from Oklahoma State, won the individual title.

== Qualifying ==
The NCAA held three regional qualifying tournaments, with the top ten teams from each event qualifying for the national championship.

Regional name	Golf course	Dates
East Regional	Glenmaura National Golf Club; Moosic, Pennsylvania	May 18–20, 2000
Central Regional	Victoria Country Club; Victoria, Texas	May 18–20, 2000
West Regional	Riverbend Golf Course; Fresno, California	May 18–20, 2000

== Individual results ==
=== Individual champion ===
- Charles Howell III, Oklahoma State (265)

== Team results ==
=== Finalists ===
Rank	Team	Score
T1	Oklahoma State	1,116
T1	Georgia Tech	1,116
3	Arizona	1,118
4	Houston	1,122
5	Texas	1,125
6	UNLV	1,131
7	Clemson	1,133
8	Northwestern	1,139
9	Kent State	1,141
10	North Carolina	1,143
11	TCU	1,146
12	Minnesota	1,149
13	Fresno State	1,154
14	Auburn	1,161
15	Wake Forest	1,169

=== Eliminated after 36 holes ===
Rank	Team	Score
16	Georgia (DC)	582
T17	California	583
T17	East Tennessee State	583
T19	Mississippi State	584
T19	New Mexico	584
21	Kansas	585
22	Georgia State	587
T23	Oklahoma	588
T23	Pepperdine	588
T25	Arizona State	589
T25	Virginia	589
27	North Florida	590
28	BYU	593
29	USC	599
30	Washington	613

- DC = Defending champions
- Debut appearance
