= Dave Heeke =

American university sports administrator

Biographical details
- Born: October 8, 1963 (age 63); East Lansing, Michigan, U.S.
- Education: Albion College

Administrative career (AD unless noted)
- 1988–2006: Oregon (assistant athletics director)
- 2006–2017: Central Michigan
- 2017–2024: Arizona

Dave Heeke (born October 8, 1963) is an American former university sports administrator who last served as athletic director at the University of Arizona.

== College ==
Heeke earned a bachelor's degree in 1985 from Albion College, where he was a member of the club hockey team and co-captain of the baseball team, then earning a master's degree from Ohio State University in 1987.

== Career ==
Heeke served 18 years at the University of Oregon, initially holding a role boosting the program's support in Portland. He became athletics director of Central Michigan University on January 16, 2006, and served 11 years in the role. Heeke then became director of athletics at the University of Arizona on April 1, 2017. His five-year contract began with a $500,000 annual salary plus incentives, escalating annually. He received a new contract which extended his run as school athletic director through the 2024-25 season but was replaced on February 2, 2024 by former Wildcats Softball coach Mike Candrea, who served as interim athletic director until the hiring of Desireé Reed-Francois which was announced on February 19, 2024.

Hires while at Arizona:

- Augie Busch, Arizona Swimming and Diving
- John Court, Arizona Gymnastics
- Ryan Stotland, Arizona Women's Tennis
- Jedd Fisch, Arizona Football
- Tommy Lloyd, Arizona Basketball
- Caitlin Lowe, Arizona Softball
- Bernard Lagat, Arizona Cross Country
- Becca Moros, Arizona Women's Soccer
- Chip Hale, Arizona Baseball
- Wes Johnson, Arizona Triathlon
- Charita Stubbs, Arizona Volleyball
- Brent Brennan, Arizona Football

== Family ==
Heeke and his wife, Liz, are parents to three boys, Ryan, Max and Zach.

== See also ==
List of NCAA Division I athletic directors
