= 1983 NCAA Division I men's golf championship =

1983 NCAA Division I Men's Golf Championship
Tournament information
- Location: Fresno, California, U.S. 36.851261°N 119.852079°W
- Course: San Joaquin Country Club

Statistics
- Field: 32 teams

Champion
- Team: Oklahoma State (5th title); Individual: Jim Carter, Arizona State
- Team: 1,161; Individual: 287

Location map
- Location in the United States Location in California

The 1983 NCAA Division I Men's Golf Championships was the 45th annual NCAA-sanctioned golf tournament to determine the individual and team national champions of men's collegiate golf at the University Division level in the United States.

The tournament was held at the San Joaquin Country Club in Fresno, California.

Oklahoma Staten won the team championship, the Cowboys' fifth NCAA title.

Jim Carter, from Arizona State, won the individual title.

== Individual results ==
=== Individual champion ===
- Jim Carter, Arizona State

== Team results ==
=== Finalists ===
Rank	Team	Score
1	Oklahoma State	1,161
2	Texas	1,168
3	Houston (DC)	1,170
4	Ohio State	1,173
5	Clemson	1,176
6	Georgia	1,179
7	UCLA	1,181
T8	North Carolina	1,185
T8	Oklahoma	1,185
T10	BYU	1,186
T10	Texas A&M	1,186
12	Fresno State	1,189
T13	Missouri	1,193
T13	Wake Forest	1,193
15	Pacific	1,197

=== Missed cut ===
Rank	Team	Score
16	Florida	896
17	Alabama	898
18	Ball State	900
19	USC	901
20	Florida State	902
21	Lamar	904
22	Oregon	907
T23	Oral Roberts	909
T23	San Diego State	909
T23	Temple	909
26	San José State	910
27	TCU	911
28	Weber State	912
29	Bowling Green	915
30	NC State	922
31	Holy Cross	966
32	Navy	967

- DC = Defending champions
- Debut appearance
