= Steve Friesen =

American professional golfer (born 1977)

Personal information
- Nationality: United States
- Born: April 12, 1977 (age 49) Lincoln, Nebraska, U.S.
- Height: 6 ft 2 in (1.88 m)
- Weight: 185 lb (84 kg; 13.2 st)

Career
- Sport: Golf
- College: University of Nebraska–Lincoln
- Turned professional: 1999
- Former tours: Web.com Tour; Canadian Tour
- Professional wins: 6

Number of wins by tour
- Korn Ferry Tour: 1
- Other: 5

Achievements and awards
- Ben Hogan Award: 1999

Steve Friesen (born April 12, 1977) is an American professional golfer who played on the Web.com Tour.

== Career ==
Friesen attended the University of Nebraska–Lincoln where in 1999 he won the Ben Hogan Award for the nations top scholar-athlete and was also named All-America honorable mention. He turned pro that year.

Friesen played on several mini-tours early in his career and also played on the Canadian Tour. He joined the Nationwide Tour in 2009 but sat out in 2010 due to injury. He returned to the Tour in August 2011 and won his second event of the year at the Price Cutter Charity Championship.

He is currently the Director of Instruction at Firethorn Golf Course in Lincoln, Nebraska.

== Amateur wins ==
- 1998 Nebraska Amateur Stroke Play, Nebraska Amateur Match Play

== Professional wins (6) ==
=== Nationwide Tour wins (1) ===
No.	Date	Tournament	Winning score	Margin of victory	Runner-up
1	Aug 14, 2011	Price Cutter Charity Championship	−26 (62-68-68-64=262)	5 strokes	(Australia) Gavin Coles

=== Other wins (5) ===
- 2001 Baton Rouge Open (Tight Lies Tour)
- 2003 Waterloo Open, Utah Open
- 2005 New Mexico Open, Nevada Open
