= 1953 NCAA golf championship =

1953 NCAA Golf Championship
Tournament information
- Location: Colorado Springs, Colorado, U.S. 38.7911°N 104.8502°W
- Course: The Broadmoor

Statistics
- Field: 19 teams

Champion
- Team: Stanford (6th title); Individual: Earl Moeller (Oklahoma A&M)

Location map
- Location in the United States Location in Colorado

The 1953 NCAA Golf Championship was the 15th annual NCAA-sanctioned golf tournament to determine the individual and team national champions of men's collegiate golf in the United States.

The tournament was held at The Broadmoor in Colorado Springs, Colorado.

Stanford won the team title, the Indians' sixth NCAA team national title.

== Individual results ==
=== Individual champion ===
- Earl Moeller, Oklahoma A&M

=== Tournament medalist ===
- Merle Backlund, Colorado (137)

== Team results ==
Rank	Team	Score
1	Stanford	578
2	North Carolina	580
3	LSU	581
4	Oklahoma A&M	582
5	North Texas State (DC)	583
6	Texas	586
7	Notre Dame	587
8	Houston	592
9	Purdue	594
T10	Colorado	598
T10	Denver	598

- Note: Top 10 only
- DC = Defending champions
