= 2009 NCAA Division I men's golf championship =

2009 NCAA Division I Men's Golf Championship
Tournament information
- Dates: May 26–30, 2009
- Location: Toledo, Ohio, U.S. 41.651848°N 83.650993°W
- Course: Inverness Club

Statistics
- Par: 71
- Field: 156 players, 30 teams

Champion
- Team: Texas A&M; Individual: Matt Hill, NC State
- Team: 3–2 (def. Arkansas); Individual: 207 (−6)

Location map
- Location in the United States Location in Ohio

The 2009 NCAA Division I Men's Golf Championship was a golf tournament contested from May 26 to May 30, 2009 at the Inverness Club in Toledo, Ohio. It was the 71st NCAA Division I Men's Golf Championship. The team championship was won by the Texas A&M Aggies who won their first national championship by defeating the Arkansas Razorbacks in the championship match play round 3–2. This was the first tournament to feature a match play playoff to determine the national champion. The individual national championship was won by Matt Hill from North Carolina State University.

== Venue ==
This was the second NCAA Division I Men's Golf Championship held at the Inverness Club in Toledo, Ohio. The first was won by Notre Dame in 1944.

== Team competition ==
=== Leaderboard ===
- Par, single-round: 288
- Par, total: 864

The top eight teams advanced to the match play portion of the tournament.

Place	Team	Round 1	Round 2	Round 3	Total (To par)
1	Oklahoma State				
2	Arizona State				
3	Southern California				
4	Arkansas				
5	Washington				
6	Michigan				
7	Texas A&M				
8	Georgia				

- Rest of the Field:

Alabama, Florida, UCLA, Tennessee, Georgia Tech, Illinois, Stanford, South Carolina, Central Florida, Texas Tech,Oregon, 19. Texas, Chattanooga, Arizona, Virginia, Ohio State, Northwestern, San Diego, TCU, Wake Forest, Duke, Iowa

=== Match play bracket ===
Quarterfinal round June 4
1	Oklahoma State	2
8	Georgia	3
4	Arkansas	3
5	Washington	2
3	Southern California	2
6	Michigan	3
2	Arizona State	1.5
7	Texas A&M	3.5

Semifinal round June 5
8	Georgia	3.5
4	Arkansas	1.5
6	Michigan	1.5
7	Texas A&M	3.5

Final round June 6
4	Arkansas	2
7	Texas A&M	3
