= Nick Gilliam =

American professional golfer

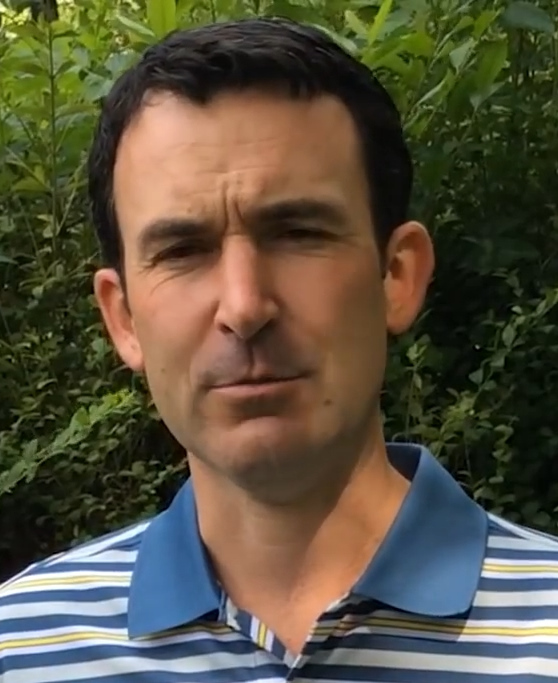
- Gilliam in 2015

Personal information
- Full name: Nick Gilliam
- Nationality: United States
- Born: December 27, 1978 (age 47) Green Bay, Wisconsin, U.S.
- Height: 6 ft 5 in (1.96 m)
- Weight: 205 lb (93 kg; 14.6 st)

Career
- Sport: Golf
- College: University of North Carolina; University of Florida
- Turned professional: 2001
- Former tour: NGA Hooters Tour

Best results in major championships
- Masters Tournament: DNP
- PGA Championship: DNP
- U.S. Open: CUT: 2005
- The Open Championship: DNP

Nick Gilliam (born December 27, 1978) is an American professional golfer. Gilliam is best known for winning the individual NCAA Division I Men's Golf Championship in 2001.

== Early life ==
In 1978, Gilliam was born in Green Bay, Wisconsin. He attended Preble High School in Green Bay until halfway through his junior year, when he moved to Gainesville, Florida to complete his final year and a half of high school. Gilliam was recognized as a Florida Academic Scholar and graduated from Gainesville High School.

== Amateur career ==
Gilliam began his collegiate career at the University of North Carolina in Chapel Hill, North Carolina, where he played for the North Carolina Tar Heels men's golf team for a single semester.

Gilliam transferred to the University of Florida in Gainesville, Florida. He played for coach Buddy Alexander's Florida Gators men's golf team in NCAA competition from 1998 to 2001. As a senior in 2001, he was the captain and statistical leader of the Gators men's golf team that won the NCAA Division I Men's Golf Championship. Gilliam shot a final-round score of 71 to win the individual NCAA championship with a 72-hole total of 276 (-12). He was also a three-time All-Southeastern Conference (SEC) academic selection (1999, 2000, 2001), and was recognized as an All-American in 2001.

== Professional career ==
In 2001, Gilliam turned professional. He played mostly on lower level tours. He has competed in a handful of tournaments on the PGA Tour and the second-tier Nationwide Tour. He qualified for the 2005 U.S. Open but missed the cut.

== Awards and honors ==
- While at the University of Florida, Gilliam earn All-SEC academic selection three times: in 1999, 2000, and 2001.
- In 2001, Gilliam earned All-American honors.

== Results in major championships ==
Tournament	2005
U.S. Open	CUT

CUT = missed the halfway cut
Note: Gilliam only played in the U.S. Open.

== See also ==
- List of Florida Gators golfers
- List of University of Florida alumni
