= 2007 NCAA Division I men's golf championship =

2007 NCAA Division I Men's Golf Championship
Tournament information
- Dates: May 30 – June 2, 2007
- Location: Williamsburg, Virginia, U.S. 37.267649°N 76.699187°W
- Course: Golden Horseshoe Golf Club

Statistics
- Par: 70
- Field: 156 players, 30 teams
- Cut: 209 (individual); 850 (team)

Champion
- Team: Stanford; Individual: Jamie Lovemark, USC
- Team: 1,109 (−11); Individual: 271 (−9)

Location map
- Location in the United States Location in Virginia

The 2007 NCAA Division I Men's Golf Championship was a golf tournament contested from May 30 to June 2, 2007 at the Golden Horseshoe Golf Club in Williamsburg, Virginia. It was the 69th NCAA Division I Men's Golf Championship and was hosted by Virginia Commonwealth University. The team championship was won by the Stanford Cardinal who captured their eighth national championship (and first since 1994) by twelve strokes over the Georgia Bulldogs in stroke play. The individual national championship was won by Jamie Lovemark from USC.

== Venue ==
This was the first NCAA Division I Men's Golf Championship hosted at the Golden Horseshoe Golf Club in Williamsburg, Virginia; the tournament was hosted by Virginia Commonwealth University which is located nearby in Richmond, Virginia.
