= Karsten Creek =

Golf Club in Stillwater, Oklahoma, US

Coordinates: 36°06′09″N 97°11′07″W

Karsten Creek Golf Club is located 6 miles (9.7 km) west on State Highway 51, just outside Stillwater, Oklahoma. It replaced Lakeside Golf Course as the home course of the Oklahoma State University (OSU) Men's and Women's golf teams in 1994. Karsten now stands as one of the most respected college golf courses in America, and is a powerful aid in the recruiting and development of athletes in the 12-time national champion Cowboy golf program.

Mike Holder, a former Cowboy golf coach and athletic director at Oklahoma State, convinced famed golf course architect Tom Fazio to design the course in hopes of creating one of the most challenging courses in the United States on the Oklahoma plains. Fellow golf course architect Andrew Green redesigned the course as part of a renovation completed in 2025.

The original layout stretched over 7,400 yards (6,800 m) with SR1020 bent-grass greens and zoysia fairways that wind through native blackjack oak trees. The redesigned layout stretches over 8,000 yards (7,300 m) with Tahoma-31 Bermuda sod fairways. 110-acre (0.45 km^{2}) Lake Louise comes into play on many holes, with the greens lying just a few yards away from the water on some occasions. Karsten and Lake Louise earned their names to honor Karsten Solheim, founder of Karsten Manufacturing (manufacturer of the PING brand of golf clubs), and his wife Louise, both of whom have been great supporters of the Oklahoma State golf program for many years. The $4.5 million clubhouse was completed in June 2001.

== Honors ==
Karsten Creek Golf Club was opened on May 9, 1994, and earned the distinction of "Best New Public Course for 1994" by Golf Digest and has earned numerous accolades since. Golf Digest honored Karsten again in 1998, this time awarding the course its first five-star rating, giving Karsten the distinction of being among only ten courses in the United States to earn such an honor. Karsten Creek was selected as host site for the NCAA Men's Golf Championship in 2003, 2011, and 2018. Travel & Leisure Golf magazine ranked Karsten as the best college course in the country.

== Scorecard ==
Karsten Score Card (All measurements in yards)
Hole	1	2	3	4	5	6	7	8	9	10	11	12	13	14	15	16	17	18	Totals
Cowboy tees	542	458	198	349	481	350	206	501	623	477	209	351	425	570	217	471	471	551	7449
Member tees	496	400	177	320	456	322	165	412	535	395	169	340	404	522	175	399	428	482	6597
Fazio tees	496	377	155	297	397	286	137	396	490	362	147	303	385	492	152	367	390	440	6069
Par	5	4	3	4	4	4	3	4	5	4	3	4	4	5	3	4	4	5	72
Handicap rating	15	1	7	11	5	9	13	3	17	6	10	18	4	12	16	8	2	14	

Tees	Slope / Rating
Cowboy tees	77.2 / 152
Member tees	73.3 / 141
Fazio tees	71.1 / 134

== Services available ==
- Restaurant: Breakfast (weekends only) Lunch (everyday) Dinners (limited)
- Pro-Shop Merchandise & Apparel
- PING Golf Clubs
- Certified PING Club Fittings
- Individual and Group Instruction
- Junior Golf Instruction
- Meetings & Events
- Lodging
