= South Carolina Gamecocks men's golf =

South Carolina Gamecocks
- University: University of South Carolina
- Conference: SEC
- Head coach: Men's: Vacant
- Location: Columbia, South Carolina
- Course: Cobblestone Park; Par: 71; Yards: 6788
- Nickname: Gamecocks
- Colors: Garnet and black

NCAA match play
- 2016

NCAA Championship appearances
- 1964, 1978, 1984, 1988, 1989, 1991, 1992, 1996, 1997, 1998, 1999, 2001, 2003, 2006, 2007, 2009, 2013, 2014, 2015, 2016, 2019, 2025, 2026

Conference champions
- 1964 ACC; 1991 Metro Conference

Individual conference champions
- Rick Williams (1990 Metro Conference); Carl Paulson (1991 Metro Conference); Eric Ecker (1998 SEC); Matthew NeSmith (2015 SEC)

The South Carolina Gamecocks men's golf team represents the University of South Carolina and competes in the Southeastern Conference in Division I of the NCAA. Major team victories include the 1964 ACC Championship, the 1991 Metro Conference Championship, and the 2007 NCAA West Regional Championship. The Gamecocks also had runner-up finishes in the 1968 ACC Championship; the 1984, 1986, 1988, 1989, and 1990 Metro Conference Championships; and the 1998, 2008, 2013, and 2015 SEC Championships. Under the guidance of head coach Bill McDonald, the South Carolina men's golf program has won or shared 21 tournament titles and made seven NCAA championship appearances. Last season the Gamecocks finished ninth at the NCAA Championship and matched the school record of nine top-five finishes in 12 events, including three tournament wins.

== Coaches ==
- Vacant - Head Coach
- Ben Dietrich - Assistant Coach

== Former head coaches ==
- Puggy Blackmon (1995-2007)
  - GCAA Hall of Fame, 2004
- Steve Liebler (1987-1995)
- Bobby Foster (1977-1987)
  - South Carolina Golf Hall of Fame, 2010

== Conference history ==
The University of South Carolina left the ACC in 1971, following numerous disputes over the ACC's recruiting regulations and the political dominance of the conference's four North Carolina schools. USC then competed as an independent until 1983 when it joined the Metro Conference for all sports except football and men's soccer. In 1991, the Gamecocks joined the SEC when it increased its membership to 12 schools.

== Notable wins and honors ==
- Mark Anderson
  - 2005 Schenkel E-Z-Go Invitational
  - 2005 SEC Freshman of the Year
  - 2005 & 2008 All-American
- George Bryan
  - 2008 Schenkel E-Z-Go Invitational
  - 2010 SEC Championship Runner-Up
  - 2007, 2009 & 2010 All-American
  - Golf Channel "Big Break" Contestant
- Michael Christie
  - 1992 All-American
- Eric Ecker
  - 1998 SEC Championship
  - 1998 & 1999 All-American
- Dykes Harbin
  - 2012 Southeastern Amateur
  - 2012 AutoTrader.com Collegiate Classic
- Webb Heintzelman
  - 1984 All-American
- Mike Holland
  - 1976 South Carolina Amateur
  - 1978 All-American
  - South Carolina Golf Hall of Fame, 2006
- Jeff Hull
  - 1989 All-American
- Eirik Johansen
  - 2003 & 2006 All-American
- Steve Liebler
  - 1979 Guilford College Invitational
  - 1980 Andy Bean Intercollegiate
  - 1981 Southeastern Intercollegiate
  - 1981, 1994 & 2011 Eastern Amateur
  - 1980 & 1981 All-American
- Will Murphy
  - 2014 Azalea Invitational
  - 2014 Sunnehanna Amateur
  - 2014 All-American
- Matthew NeSmith
  - 2012 Azalea Invitational
  - 2013 SEC Freshman of the Year
  - 2013 All-American
  - 2015 Hootie at Bulls Bay Intercollegiate
  - 2015 SEC Championship
- Carl Paulson
  - 1991 Metro Conference Championship
  - 1991 LSU National Invitational
  - 1993 Billy Hitchcock Intercollegiate
  - 1993 Ping Intercollegiate
  - 1993 SEC Player of the Year
  - 1993 All-American
- Allen Powers
  - 1967 South Carolina Intercollegiate
  - 1967 Palmetto Intercollegiate
  - 1968 All-American
  - 1982 South Carolina Amateur
  - South Carolina Golf Hall of Fame, 1996
- Brett Quigley
  - 1989 Metro Conference Tournament Runner-Up
  - 1991 All-American
- David Seawell
  - 1994, 1995 & 1996 All-American
- Mark Silvers
  - 2009 SEC Scholar-Athlete of the Year
  - 2009 All-American
- Will Starke
  - 2014 Seahawk Intercollegiate
- Caleb Sturgeon
  - 2012 Wendy's Kiawah Classic
  - 2014 Badger Invitational
- Kyle Thompson
  - 1997 Palmetto Classic
  - 1999 Seminole Classic
  - 1999 NCAA East Regional
  - 2000 Carpet Capital Collegiate
  - 2001 NCAA West Regional
  - 1999, 2000 & 2001 All-American
- David Tolley
  - 1982 U.S. Amateur Runner-up
  - 1984 All-American
- Fred Wadsworth
  - 1984 Imperial Lakes Invitational
  - 1984 Eastern Amateur
  - 1984 Gamecock Invitational
  - 1984 All-American
- Rick Williams
  - 1988 Wolfpack Invitational
  - 1989 Palmetto Invitational
  - 1990 Metro Conference Championship
  - 1990 All-American

== Gamecocks on the European Tour ==
- Florian Fritsch
- Eirik Johansen
- James Morrison
  - 2010 Madeira Islands Open BPI - Portugal

== Gamecocks on the PGA Tour ==
- Mark Anderson
  - 2013 BMW Charity Pro-Am
- Wesley Bryan
  - 2017 RBC Heritage
  - 2016 Chitimacha Louisiana Open
  - 2016 El Bosque Mexico Championship
  - 2016 Digital Ally Open
  - 2016 Web.com Tour Player of the Year
- Michael Christie
  - 1995 Nike Carolina Classic
  - 1996 Nike Greater Greenville Classic
  - 1996 Nike Permian Basin Open
  - 1996 Nike Utah Classic
- Mike Holland
  - 1981 Walt Disney World National Team Championship with Vance Heafner
- Steve Liebler
- Carl Paulson
  - 1995 PGA Tour Qualifying Tournament - medalist
  - 1999 Nike Utah Classic
  - 1999 Nike Boise Open
- Brett Quigley
  - 1996 NIKE Philadelphia Classic
  - 2001 BUY.COM Arkansas Classic
- Kyle Thompson
  - 2007 Rex Hospital Open
  - 2007 Oregon Classic
  - 2011 Rex Hospital Open
- Fred Wadsworth
  - 1986 Southern Open
  - 1989 South African Open
