= Oklahoma State Cowboys golf =

College golf team

- University: Oklahoma State University
- Conference: Big 12
- Head coach: Men's: Alan Bratton (12th season)
- Location: Stillwater, Oklahoma
- Course: Karsten Creek Golf Club; Par: 72; Yards: 7,449
- Nickname: Cowboys
- Colors: Orange and black

NCAA champions
- 1963, 1976, 1978, 1980, 1983, 1987, 1991, 1995, 2000, 2006, 2018, 2025

NCAA individual champions
- Earl Moeller (1953); Grier Jones (1968); David Edwards (1978); Scott Verplank (1986); Brian Watts (1987); E.J. Pfister (1988); Charles Howell III (2000); Jonathan Moore (2006); Matthew Wolff (2019); Preston Stout (2026)

NCAA runner-up
- 1958, 1960, 1962, 1964, 1973, 1975, 1977, 1979, 1982, 1984, 1985, 1986, 1988, 1999, 2003, 2010, 2014

NCAA match play
- 2009, 2010, 2011, 2014, 2017, 2018, 2019, 2021, 2022, 2025, 2026

NCAA Championship appearances
- 1947, 1948, 1949, 1950, 1951, 1952, 1953, 1954, 1955, 1956, 1957, 1958, 1959, 1960, 1961, 1962, 1963, 1964, 1965, 1966, 1967, 1968, 1969, 1970, 1971, 1972, 1973, 1974, 1975, 1976, 1977, 1978, 1979, 1980, 1981, 1982, 1983, 1984, 1985, 1986, 1987, 1988, 1989, 1990, 1991, 1992, 1993, 1994, 1995, 1996, 1997, 1998 1999, 2000, 2001, 2002, 2003, 2004, 2005, 2006, 2007, 2008, 2009, 2010, 2011, 2013, 2014, 2015, 2016, 2017, 2018, 2019, 2021, 2022, 2024, 2025, 2026

Conference champions
- Missouri Valley; 1947, 1948, 1949, 1950, 1951, 1952, 1953, 1954, 1955 Big Eight; 1958, 1959, 1960, 1961, 1962, 1963, 1964, 1965, 1966, 1967, 1969, 1970, 1971, 1972, 1973, 1974, 1975, 1976, 1977, 1978, 1979, 1980, 1981, 1982, 1983, 1985, 1986, 1987, 1988, 1989, 1990, 1991, 1993, 1994, 1995, 1996 Big 12; 1997, 1998, 2000, 2005, 2007, 2008, 2009, 2010, 2011, 2019, 2021, 2025, 2026

The Oklahoma State Cowboys golf team represents Oklahoma State University in the sport of men's golf. The Cowboys compete in Division I of the National Collegiate Athletic Association (NCAA) and the Big 12. They play their home matches on the Karsten Creek golf course, just outside the university's Stillwater, Oklahoma campus, and are currently led by 12th year head coach Alan Bratton.

The Oklahoma State men's golf program has won 12 NCAA national championships, finished as runner-up 17 times, and won 58 conference titles. Ten golfers from the program have won individual national championships.

== History ==
=== Labron Harris era (1947–1973) ===
Labron Harris, a professional golfer and architect of the Lakeside Memorial Golf Course, took over as head coach for the inaugural years of Oklahoma State golf. He quickly cemented OSU as being one of the strongest programs in the country, and under his leadership Oklahoma State claimed 24 Missouri Valley and Big 8 Conference championships. The Cowboys finished runner-up three times in 1958, 1960 and 1962, but were unable to break through until 1963, when Harris finally delivered Oklahoma State the school's first NCAA national championship. Additionally, he coached two Oklahoma State players to individual national titles, with Earl Moeller in 1953 and Grier Jones in 1968 claiming championships.

=== Mike Holder era (1973–2005) ===
Mike Holder is widely regarded as the most successful head coach in Oklahoma State golf history. As a player previously under Harris, he won the Big 8 individual conference title while leading the Cowboys to the team conference title in 1970. Under his coaching, Oklahoma State dominated the college golf scene in the 70's and 80's, winning five national titles in 1976, 1978, 1980, 1983 and 1987 while embarking on a commanding stretch from 1975–88 that saw Oklahoma State finishing first or second in 13 of the 14 years. Cowboy golfers claimed individual national titles three years in a row, with Scott Verplank in 1986, Brian Watts in 1987, and E.J. Pfister in 1988 all winning championships. The high levels of success carried on into the 1990's, with Oklahoma State winning two more national championships in 1991 and 1995 amid the opening of the Karsten Creek golf course, where the team continues to play their home matches today. The Cowboys won their 9th national title in 2000 in a playoff over Georgia Tech, with Charles Howell III simultaneously winning the school's 7th individual title. In 2005, Oklahoma State became the first school to capture four Big 12 conference titles.

=== Mike McGraw era (2005–2013) ===
Mike McGraw served as the assistant head coach from 1998–2005 before taking over the head coaching duties following the retirement of Holder. The new era was again filled with success, with Oklahoma State quickly winning the program's 10th team national championship in 2006, with Jonathan Moore simultaneously winning the program's 8th individual national title. The Cowboys won a national-record 50th conference title in 2007, but were unable to win any more national titles, only coming as close as 2nd in 2010. McGraw was fired by Holder eight years after being given the job by him, in 2013.

=== Alan Bratton era (2013–present) ===
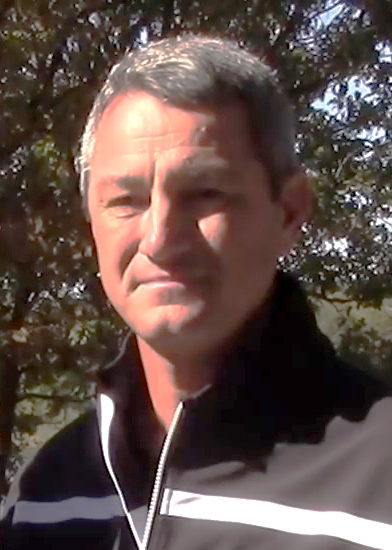
Current head coach, Alan Bratton

Alan Bratton took over as head coach in 2013, previously serving as an assistant coach for both the Oklahoma State men's and women's golf teams, before being selected to lead the women's team in 2011 and 2012. Under Bratton, Oklahoma State won their 11th national title in 2018, shutting out Alabama 5–0 at Karsten Creek to win the title on their home course. They followed the national championship season with a semifinals appearance in 2019, while Matthew Wolff won the school's 9th individual national championship by five strokes. Bratton would lead Oklahoma State to their 12th national championship in 2025, featuring a win over rival Oklahoma in the quarterfinal round before the Cowboys defeated Virginia 4–1 at La Costa to claim the national title. Oklahoma State would have another successful year in 2026, with Preston Stout winning the program's 10th individual national championship by one stroke, while the team advanced to the semifinal round in match play.

== Haskins Award ==
The Haskins Award is presented annually by the Haskins Commission to honor the most outstanding collegiate golfer in the United States. Oklahoma State golfers have won the award eight times, more than any other school in the country. Matthew Wolff most recently won the award in 2019.

- Lindy Miller (1978)
- Bob Tway (1981)
- Willie Wood (1982)
- Scott Verplank (1986)
- Charles Howell III (2000)
- Hunter Mahan (2003)
- Pablo Martín (2006)
- Matthew Wolff (2019)

== PGA Tour professionals ==
Numerous Cowboys from the men's team have gone on to success in professional golf on both the PGA and European Tours, including Bob Tway (8 PGA Tour wins, including 1986 PGA Championship), Hunter Mahan (6 PGA Tour wins, including 3 WGC events), Rickie Fowler (5 PGA Tour wins, including 2015 Players Championship, and 2 European Tour wins), Scott Verplank (5 PGA Tour wins), Danny Edwards (5 PGA Tour wins), Viktor Hovland (6 PGA Tour wins), David Edwards (4 PGA Tour wins), Michael Bradley (4 PGA Tour wins), Mark Hayes (3 PGA Tour wins, including 1977 Players Championship), Doug Tewell (4 PGA Tour wins & 8 Senior PGA Tour wins), Charles Howell III (3 PGA Tour wins), Bob Dickson (2 PGA Tour wins), Bo Van Pelt (one win each on PGA Tour and European Tour), Willie Wood (one PGA Tour win), Kevin Tway (one PGA Tour win), Pablo Martín (3 European Tour wins), Matthew Wolff (1 PGA Tour win), and Peter Uihlein (1 European Tour win). Additionally, Brian Watts went on to great success on the Japan Golf Tour, earning 12 wins.

== Karsten Creek Golf Course ==
Karsten Creek serves as the home course of the Oklahoma State University men's and women's golf teams. The Tom Fazio layout was named Golf Digest's "Best New Public Course" and served as the host site for the NCAA Men's Championship in 2003, 2011, and 2018. Travel & Leisure Golf magazine ranked Karsten Creek as the best college course in the country.

== See also ==
- Oklahoma State Cowboys and Cowgirls
- Oklahoma State University
