= Florida Gators men's golf =

Men's golf team of the University of Florida

- University: University of Florida
- Conference: SEC
- Head coach: J. C. Deacon (9th season)
- Location: Gainesville, Florida
- Course: Mark Bostick Golf Course; Par: 70; Yards: 6,701
- Nickname: Florida Gators
- Colors: Orange and blue

NCAA champions
- 1968, 1973, 1993, 2001, 2023

NCAA individual champions
- Bob Murphy (1966); Nick Gilliam (2001); Fred Biondi (2023)

Conference champions
- 1955, 1956, 1968, 1973, 1974, 1975, 1985, 1989, 1991, 1992, 1993, 1994, 1999, 2003, 2011, 2023, 2025

Individual conference champions
- Dave Ragan (1956); Tommy Aaron (1957, 1958); Steve Melnyk (1968); Jimmy McQuillan (1971); Gary Koch (1973, 1974); Phil Hancock (1975, 1976); Sam Trahan (1977); Larry Rinker (1978); Rick Pearson (1980); Chris DiMarco (1989); Brian Gay (1992, 1994); Guy Hill (1993); Camilo Benedetti (1999, 2002); Brett Stegmaier (2003, 2006); Billy Horschel (2009); Alejandro Tosti (2017); Andy Zhang (2018); John DuBois (2022)

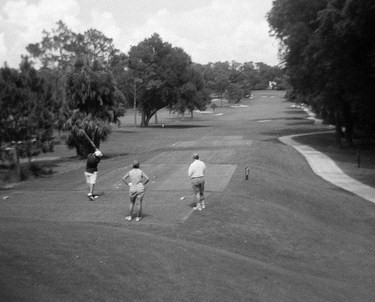
The Mark Bostick Golf Course, home course of the Florida Gators men's and women's golf teams.

The Florida Gators men's golf team represents the University of Florida in the sport of golf. The Gators compete in Division I of the National Collegiate Athletic Association (NCAA) and the Southeastern Conference (SEC). They play their home matches on the Mark Bostick Golf Course on the university's Gainesville, Florida campus, and are currently led by head coach J. C. Deacon. In the eighty-nine-year history of the Gators' men's golf program, they have won seventeen SEC championships and five NCAA national tournament championships.

== History ==
The Gators men's golf program was the fifth intercollegiate sports team established by the University of Florida, having begun competition in 1925. The Gators won their first two Southeastern Conference team championships twenty years later under coach Andrew Bracken in 1955 and coach Conrad Rehling in 1956. Those two SEC championship teams produced future PGA Tour members Doug Sanders, Tommy Aaron and Dave Ragan. Rehling's Gators also produced three back-to-back individual SEC titles: Ragan (1956) and Aaron (1957, 1958).

=== Bishop era: 1964–78 ===
Physical education professor and former high school football coach Buster Bishop became the new head coach of the Gators golf team in 1964. Improvement came quickly for Bishop's Gators, and they finished as the SEC runners-up in 1965. Gator Bob Murphy won the individual NCAA national title in 1966. And in 1967, the team finished second in the conference behind the LSU Tigers, and second in the nation behind the Houston Cougars at the NCAA championship tournament.

The 1968 Gators made history; they not only won the program's third SEC team championship, they won the NCAA championship tournament by edging the defending national champion Houston Cougars by two shots. The Gators' 1968 NCAA men's golf championship, won by John Darr, Steve Melnyk, John Sale, Richard Spears, Robert Baggs and Wendell Coffee, was the first national team championship in any sport ever won by a team from the University of Florida.

Bishop's Gators won another NCAA national team championship 1973, with an all-star team of four future PGA Tour members: Gary Koch, Andy Bean, Ben Duncan, Woody Blackburn and Phil Hancock. The 1973 Gators outpaced the second-place Oklahoma State Cowboys by ten strokes in the NCAA championship tournament. The following year, the Gators finished second by two strokes behind the Wake Forest Demon Deacons at the 1974 NCAA championship tournament.

Bishop's teams also won three back-to-back SEC team championships in 1973, 1974 and 1975. Only once in fifteen seasons did his Gators finish worse than third in the ten-team SEC. Bishop retired from coaching after the 1978 season.

=== Darr and Blevins: 1979–87 ===
John Darr, a junior letterman from the Gators' 1968 national championship team, followed Bishop as the team's coach in 1979 and 1980. In his two seasons, Darr's Gators finished second and third in the SEC, and fifteenth and tenth nationally at the NCAA championship tournament. Gator golfer Rick Pearson won the individual SEC title in 1980. Lynn Blevins served as the Gators' coach from 1981 to 1987; his teams won an SEC team championship in 1985, and were the SEC runners-up in 1986. Blevins' Gators finished third in the nation at the 1985 NCAA championship tournament, which they hosted on their home course.

=== Alexander era: 1988–2014 ===
Buddy Alexander was hired for the 1988 season. Alexander's 1993 team of Guy Hill, Chris Couch, Brian Gay, Bread Lehman and John Pettit won another national championship, besting second-place Georgia Tech Yellow Jackets by a single shot at the NCAA championship tournament. His 2001 team won the program's fourth NCAA national championship, with Gators Nick Gilliam, Camilo Benedetti, Bubba Dickerson, Camilo Villegas and Ben Banks dominating the runner-up Clemson Tigers by eighteen strokes. Team captain Gilliam also won the second individual NCAA men's golf championship in Gators history in 2001, and teammate Benedetti finished second in the NCAA championship tournament, three strokes behind Gilliam.

Alexander's Gators won eight SEC team championships (1989, 1991, 1992, 1993, 1994, 1999, 2003, 2011), and finished second in the conference seven times. Nationally, his teams won two NCAA national championships (1993, 2001), and finished second twice (1990, 2006). The Gators failed to qualify for the NCAA championship tournament only twice in his twenty-six seasons.

== Individual honors ==
In the past fifty-eight years, fifteen Gators golfers have won twenty-one SEC individual titles. Thirty-nine Gators golfers have earned sixty-seven first-team All-SEC honors. Forty-nine Gators have received ninety-three All-American honors. Three Gators have won the individual NCAA national title: Bob Murphy (1966), Nick Gilliam (2001), and Fred Biondi (2023).

Four Gators have won U.S. Amateur: Bob Murphy (1965), Steve Melnyk (1969), Fred Ridley (1975), and Bubba Dickerson (2001). The Gators' former head coach, Buddy Alexander, won the U.S. Amateur in 1986. Melnyk won the British Amateur in 1971.

== PGA Tour professionals ==
Over thirty former University of Florida alumni have represented the university on the PGA Tour, including former Gators golfers Tommy Aaron, winner of the 1973 Masters Tournament and two other Tour events, Mark Calcavecchia, winner of the 1989 British Open and thirteen other Tour events, Andy North, winner of the 1978 and 1985 U.S. Opens and one other Tour event, and Doug Sanders, winner of twenty Tour events.

== Coaching staff ==
J. C. Deacon is the head coach of the Florida Gators men's golf team; 2014–15 will be his first season with the Gators. Deacon previously served as an assistant golf coach for the University of Nevada, Las Vegas (UNLV), where he worked with the UNLV Rebels men's golf team for four years.

== Mark Bostick Golf Course ==
The Gators men's golf team host its home matches at the Mark Bostick Golf Course, located on 110 acres (0.45 km^{2}) of the university's campus in Gainesville, Florida. The university course was originally designed by noted Scottish golfer and golf course architect Donald Ross in 1921. It was partially redesigned and rebuilt by noted golf architect Bobby Weed as part of a $4 million renovation project in 2001. The renovated course is a 6,701-yard par 70, and the facilities include the Guy Bostick club house and dedicated practice areas for the Gators golf teams.

The Mark Bostick Golf Course hosts the annual Gator Invitational, as well as the annual Gator Golf Day alumni event.

== See also ==
- Florida Gators
- Florida Gators women's golf
- History of the University of Florida
- List of University of Florida Athletic Hall of Fame members
- University Athletic Association
