= Mountain West Conference women's soccer tournament =

Collegiate soccer tournament

- Sport: College soccer
- Conference: Mountain West Conference
- Number of teams: 6
- Format: Single-elimination tournament
- Current stadium: Madrid Sports Complex
- Current location: Laramie, Wyoming
- Played: 1999–present
- Last contest: 2026
- Current champion: Air Force (1st title)
- Most championships: BYU (7 titles)
- TV partner: MountainWest Sports Network
- Official website: themw.com/wsoc

The Mountain West Conference women's soccer tournament is the conference championship tournament in soccer for the Mountain West Conference (MW). The tournament has been held every year since the MW began women's soccer competition in 1999. It is a single-elimination tournament and seeding is based on regular season conference records. The winner, declared conference champion, receives the conference's automatic bid to the NCAA Division I women's soccer championship.

== Champions ==
=== Key ===
Key

- (1) — Title number
- a.e.t. — Match went to extra time
- p – Match decided by a penalty shootout after extra time
- – Winning team also won regular season

=== By Year ===
Ed.	Year	Champion	Score	Runner-up	Venue / city	MVP	Ref.
1	1999	BYU (1)	2–1 (a.e.t.)	San Diego State	Olympic Training Center • Chula Vista, CA	Maren Hendershot, BYU	
2	2000	BYU (2)	2–1	Utah	Johann Memorial Field • Las Vegas, NV	Michelle Jensen-Peterson, BYU	
3	2001	BYU (3)	2–1	UNLV	Johann Memorial Field • Las Vegas, NV	Lydia Ojuka, BYU	
4	2002	BYU (4)	5–1	New Mexico	South Field • Provo, UT	Jeni Viernes, BYU	
5	2003	Utah (1)	2–0	BYU	Rice–Eccles Stadium • Salt Lake, UT	Amber Brower, Utah	
6	2004	Utah (2)	1–1 (4–3 p)	San Diego State	South Field • Provo, UT	Sophia Perez, San Diego State	
7	2005	UNLV (1)	1–0 (a.e.t.)	New Mexico	Johann Memorial Field • Las Vegas, NV	Katie Carney, UNLV	
8	2006	UNLV (2)	0–0 (6–5 p)	Utah	Ute Field • Salt Lake, UT	Tanya Roberts, UNLV	
9	2007	BYU (5)	2–1	UNLV	South Field • Provo, UT	Katie Fellows, BYU	
10	2008	BYU (6)	2–0	Utah	Johann Memorial Field • Las Vegas, NV	Katie Larkin, BYU	
11	2009	San Diego State (1)	1–0	BYU	South Field • Provo, UT	Cat Walker, San Diego State	
12	2010	BYU (7)	1–0	New Mexico	SDSU Sports Deck • San Diego, CA	Jessica Ringwood, BYU	
13	2011	New Mexico (1)	2–0	Wyoming	UNM Soccer Complex • Albuquerque, NM	Jennifer Williams, New Mexico	
14	2012	San Diego State (2)	2–0	New Mexico	SDSU Sports Deck • San Diego, CA	Carli Johnson, San Diego State	
15	2013	San Diego State (3)	1–0	Boise State	UNM Soccer Complex • Albuquerque, NM	Hannah Keane, San Diego State	
16	2014	San Diego State (4)	1–0 (a.e.t.)	Wyoming	SDSU Sports Deck • San Diego, California	Katie Perry, San Diego State	
17	2015	San Jose State (1)	1–1 (4–2 p)	San Diego State	SDSU Sports Deck • San Diego, California	Paige Simoneau, San Jose State	
18	2016	UNLV (3)	3–3 (4–3 p)	San Diego State	SDSU Sports Deck • San Diego, California	Dakota Blazak, UNLV	
19	2017	San Diego State (5)	3–0	New Mexico	Johann Memorial Field • Las Vegas, NV	Aliyah Utush, San Diego State	
20	2018	San Jose State (2)	1–0	New Mexico	Spartan Soccer Complex • San Jose, CA	Paige Simoneau, San Jose State	
21	2019	Boise State (1)	2–0	San Diego State	Boas Soccer Complex • Boise, ID		
–	2020	(not held due to COVID-19 pandemic)					
22	2021	New Mexico (2)	2–1 (a.e.t.)	Boise State	Boas Soccer Complex • Boise, Idaho	Zaria Katesigwa, New Mexico	
23	2022	San Jose State (3)	0–0 (6–5 p)	Wyoming	UNM Soccer Complex • Albuquerque, NM	Bente Pernot, San Jose State	
24	2023	Utah State (1)	1–0	Colorado State	Madrid Sports Complex • Laramie, WY	Whitney Lopez, Utah State	
25	2024	Utah State (2)	2–1	Boise State	SDSU Sports Deck • San Diego, CA	Kaylie Chambers, Utah State	
26	2025	Utah State (3)	2–2 (4–2 p)	Boise State	Boas Soccer Complex • Boise, ID	Taylor Rath, Utah State	
27	2026	Air Force (1)	0–0 (4–2 p)	Wyoming	GCU Stadium • Phoenix, AZ	Sydney Nelms, Air Force	

=== By school ===
As of 2026 Tournament

School	Apps.	W	L	T	Pct.	Finals	Titles	Winning years
Air Force	10	5	9	1	.367	1	1	2026
Boise State	12	9	9	3	.500	5	1	2019
BYU	12	19	4	1	.813	9	7	1999, 2000, 2001, 2002, 2007, 2008, 2010
Colorado College	5	2	4	1	.357	0	0	—
Colorado State	5	2	4	2	.375	1	0	—
Fresno State	7	0	5	3	.188	0	0	—
Grand Canyon	0	0	0	0	–	0	0	—
Hawaii	1	0	1	0	.000	0	0	—
Nevada	4	1	4	0	.200	0	0	—
New Mexico	22	17	16	7	.513	8	2	2011, 2021
San Diego State	25	22	14	7	.593	10	5	2009, 2012, 2013, 2014, 2017
San Jose State	6	4	2	5	.591	3	3	2015, 2018, 2022
TCU	5	1	5	0	.167	0	0	—
UC Davis	0	0	0	0	–	0	0	—
UNLV	17	12	12	6	.500	5	3	2005, 2006, 2016
Utah	12	13	9	3	.580	5	2	2003, 2004
Utah State	8	8	4	4	.625	3	3	2023, 2024, 2025
UTEP	0	0	0	0	–	0	0	—
Wyoming	19	5	17	3	.260	4	0	—

Teams in Italics no longer sponsor women's soccer in the Mountain West.
