= 2022 Mountain West Conference women's soccer tournament =

- Classification: Division I
- Teams: 6
- Matches: 5
- Attendance: 1,598
- Site: UNM Soccer Complex; Albuquerque, New Mexico
- Champions: San Jose State (3rd title)
- Winning coach: Tina Estrada (1st title)
- MVP: Bente Pernot (San Jose State)
- Broadcast: MountainWest Sports Network

2022 Mountain West Conference women's soccer standings
	Conf.						Overall
Team	W		L		T	PCT	W		L		T	PCT
Wyoming ‍†‍‍	6	–	3	–	2	.636	8	–	6	–	6	.550
New Mexico ‍‍‍	5	–	1	–	5	.682	7	–	3	–	9	.605
San Jose St ‍‍‡‍^{y}	6	–	3	–	2	.636	8	–	7	–	7	.523
Utah State ‍‍‍	5	–	3	–	3	.591	8	–	5	–	8	.571
San Diego St ‍‍‍	5	–	3	–	3	.591	7	–	6	–	8	.524
Colorado College ‍‍‍	4	–	3	–	4	.545	7	–	7	–	5	.500
Boise St ‍‍‍	4	–	3	–	4	.545	8	–	5	–	7	.575
Air Force ‍‍‍	4	–	4	–	3	.500	7	–	7	–	4	.500
UNLV ‍‍‍	3	–	3	–	5	.500	5	–	9	–	5	.395
Colorado St ‍‍‍	1	–	4	–	6	.364	4	–	7	–	8	.421
Nevada ‍‍‍	2	–	8	–	1	.227	3	–	12	–	3	.250
Fresno St ‍‍‍	1	–	8	–	2	.182	1	–	14	–	4	.158
† – Conference champion ‡ – 2022 MW Tournament champion y – Invited to the NCAA Tournament; As of December 6, 2022; Rankings from United Soccer Coaches Poll; Source:Mountain West Conference

The 2022 Mountain West Conference women's soccer tournament was the postseason women's soccer tournament for the Mountain West Conference held from October 30 through November 5, 2022. The five-match tournament took place at UNM Soccer Complex in Albuquerque, New Mexico. The six-team single-elimination tournament consisted of three rounds based on seeding from regular season conference play. The New Mexico Lobos were the defending champions. The Lobos were unable to defend their crown, losing to San Jose State in penalties in the Semifinals. San Jose State won the title after a second penalty shootout victory over Wyoming in the Final. This was the third tournament championship for San Jose State, their first since 2018. It was the first title for head coach Tina Estrada. As tournament champions, San Jose State earned the Mountain West's automatic berth into the 2022 NCAA Division I Women's Soccer Tournament.

== Seeding ==
The top six teams from regular season play qualified for the 2022 Tournament. Teams were seeded based on their regular season records. Tiebreakers were used to determine seeds if teams were tied on regular season record. There was a three-way tie for the regular season championship between Wyoming, New Mexico, and San Jose State as all three teams finished with 20 points in conference play. The tiebreaker was determined by regular season records amongst the three tied teams. Wyoming earned the first seed finishing with a win over San Jose State and a tie with New Mexico. New Mexico was the second seed after finishing with a tie against both teams. Therefore, San Jose State was the third seed as they lost to Wyoming and tied with New Mexico. Another tiebreaker was required for the third and fourth seeds in the tournament, as Utah State and San Diego State both finished with 5–3–3 records in the regular season. The team's regular season matchup finished tied 0–0, so a second tiebreaker of goal difference in conference matches was used. Utah State earned the forth seed based on this tiebreaker as they finished with a +5 goal difference while San Diego State finished with a +4 goal difference. A final tiebreaker was needed to determine the sixth and final team in the tournament after Colorado College and Boise State finished with identical 4–3–4 conference records. These two teams also tied their regular season matchup 0–0. Colorado College qualified for the tournament based on their +3 goal difference in conference matches, while Boise State finished with a +1 goal difference.

Seed	School	Conference Record	Points
1	Wyoming	6–3–2	20
2	New Mexico	5–1–5	20
3	San Jose State	6–3–2	20
4	Utah State	5–3–3	18
5	San Diego State	5–3–3	18
6	Colorado College	4–3–4	16

== Bracket ==
First Round; Sunday, Oct. 30
4	Utah State	0 (18)
5	San Diego St (pen.)	0 (19)
3	San Jose St	1
6	Colorado College	0

Semifinals; Wednesday, Nov. 2
1	Wyoming	1
5	San Diego St	0
2	New Mexico	0 (2)
3	San Jose St (pen.)	0 (4)

Final; Saturday, Nov. 5
1	Wyoming	0 (5)
3	San Jose St (pen.)	0 (6)

== Schedule ==
=== First round ===
October 30	#4 Utah State	0–0 (a.e.t.) (18–19 p)	#5 San Diego State	Albuquerque, NM
4:00 p.m. MT	London Miller (yellow card) 101'	Report	(yellow card) 44' Denise Castro	Stadium: UNM Soccer Complex; Attendance: 101; Referee: Cuahutemoc Delgadillo; Assistant referees: Amanda Forletta; Xavier Chavez; Fourth official: Nader Khalil
	Penalties
	Sammie Murock (penalty scored); Talia Winder (penalty scored); Tess Werts (penalty scored); Rine Yonaha (penalty scored); Alex Day (penalty scored); Jordan Foraker (penalty scored); Addy Symonds (penalty scored); London Miller (penalty scored); Kelsey Kaufusi (penalty scored); Sara Taylor (penalty missed); Rine Yonaha (penalty scored); Alex Day (penalty missed); Sammie Murdock (penalty scored); Tess Werts (penalty scored); Jordan Foraker (penalty missed); Addy Symonds (penalty scored); Talia Winder (penalty scored); Kelsey Kaufusi (penalty scored); Sara Taylor (penalty scored); Rine Yonaha (penalty scored); Sammie Murdock (penalty missed)		(penalty scored) Oliva Sekimoto; (penalty scored) Emma Gaines-Ramos; (penalty scored) Kiera Utush; (penalty scored) Denise Castro; (penalty scored) Claire Watkins; (penalty scored) Rachelle Elve; (penalty scored) Julia Gomez; (penalty scored) Dori Savage; (penalty scored) Carlin Blake; (penalty missed) Alexa Madueno; (penalty scored) Oliva Sekimoto; (penalty missed) Emma Gaines-Ramos; (penalty scored) Kiera Utush; (penalty scored) Denise Castro; (penalty missed) Claire Watkins; (penalty scored) Julia Gomez; (penalty scored) Rachelle Elve; (penalty scored) Dori Savage; (penalty scored) Carlin Blake; (penalty scored) Alexa Madueno; (penalty scored) Kiera Utush; (penalty scored) Rachelle Elve

October 30	#3 San Jose State	1–0	#6 Colorado College	Albuquerque, NM
7:00 p.m. MT	Taylor Phillips 77'	Report		Stadium: UNM Soccer Complex; Attendance: 116; Referee: Santos Toquinto; Assistant referees: Chris Frazier; Nader Khalil; Fourth official: Cuahutemoc Delgadillo

=== Semifinals ===
November 2	#1 Wyoming	1–0	#5 San Diego State	Albuquerque, NM
4:00 p.m. MT	Maddie Chance 8'; Taylor Brook (yellow card) 66' (yellow-red card) 73'; Jamie Tatum (yellow card) 87'	Report	(yellow card) 61' Trinity Coker	Stadium: UNM Soccer Complex; Attendance: 419; Referee: Cristian Campo Hernandez; Assistant referees: Cuahutemoc Delgadillo; Amanda Forletta; Fourth official: Megan McCain

November 2	#2 New Mexico	0–0 (a.e.t.) (2–4 p)	#3 San Jose State	Albuquerque, NM
7:00 p.m. MT	Paige Satterlee (yellow card) 93'	Report	(yellow card) 57' Isabella Shallou-Enes	Stadium: UNM Soccer Complex; Attendance: 718; Referee: Cristian Campo Hernandez; Assistant referees: Cuahutemoc Delgadillo; Amanda Forletta; Fourth official: Megan McCain
	Penalties
	Molly Myers (penalty missed); Karlee Maes (penalty scored); Jaelyn Hendren (penalty scored); Jadyn Edwards (penalty missed)		(penalty scored) Sabrina Weinman; (penalty scored) Bente Pernot; (penalty scored) Kiana Miyazato; (penalty scored) Bella Flocchini

=== Final ===
November 5	#1 Wyoming	0–0 (a.e.t.) (5–6 p)	#3 San Jose State	Albuquerque, NM
6:00 p.m. MT	Sydney Miller (yellow card) 69'; Eliza-Grace Smith (yellow card) 90'	Report	(yellow card) 102' Tatiana Cunningham	Stadium: UNM Soccer Complex; Attendance: 244; Referee: Megan McCain; Assistant referees: Cuahutemoc Delgadillo; Cristian Campo Hernandez; Fourth official: Amanda Forletta
	Penalties
	Jamie Tatum (penalty scored); Amber Vokoun (penalty missed); Nikayla Copenhaver (penalty scored); Lily Brongo (penalty scored); Ally Beavers (penalty scored); Keelie Wortmann (penalty scored); Alyssa Glover (penalty missed)		(penalty scored) Sabrina Weinman; (penalty scored) Kayla Fortenberry; (penalty missed) Bente Pernot; (penalty scored) Kiana Miyazato; (penalty scored) Bella Flocchini; (penalty scored) Isabella Shallou-Enes; (penalty scored) Cynthia Flores

== Statistics ==
=== Goalscorers ===
There were 2 goals scored in 5 matches, for an average of 0.4 goals per match (as of November 5, 2022).

1 goal

- Taylor Phillips – San Jose State
- Maddie Chance – Wyoming

== All-Tournament team ==
Player	Team
Jadyn Edwards	New Mexico
Myah Isais	New Mexico
Alexa Madueno	San Jose State
Kiera Utush	San Jose State
Kiana Miyazato	San Jose State
**Bente Pernot**	San Jose State
Taylor Phillips	San Jose State
Jada Wilson	San Jose State
Maddi Chance	Wyoming
Miyuki Schoyen	Wyoming
Jamie Tatum	Wyoming

MVP in bold
