= 2024 Mountain West Conference women's soccer tournament =

- Classification: Division I
- Teams: 6
- Matches: 5
- Attendance: 1,893
- Site: SDSU Sports Deck; San Diego, California
- Champions: Utah State (2nd title)
- Winning coach: Manny Martins (2nd title)
- MVP: Kaylie Chambers (Utah State)
- Broadcast: MountainWest Sports Network

2024 Mountain West Conference women's soccer standings
	Conf.						Overall
Team	W		L		T	PCT	W		L		T	PCT
Boise St ‍†‍‍	8	–	1	–	2	.818	16	–	4	–	2	.773
Utah State ‍‍‡‍^{y}	7	–	1	–	3	.773	18	–	1	–	5	.854
Colorado St ‍‍‍	7	–	1	–	3	.773	12	–	5	–	4	.667
San Diego St ‍‍‍	6	–	2	–	3	.682	9	–	7	–	4	.550
UNLV ‍‍‍	5	–	5	–	1	.500	7	–	11	–	2	.400
Colorado College ‍‍‍	4	–	5	–	2	.455	8	–	9	–	3	.475
Nevada ‍‍‍	4	–	5	–	2	.455	6	–	13	–	2	.333
Wyoming ‍‍‍	2	–	3	–	6	.455	4	–	6	–	9	.447
New Mexico ‍‍‍	3	–	5	–	3	.409	7	–	6	–	5	.528
Fresno St ‍‍‍	2	–	7	–	2	.273	7	–	9	–	3	.447
San Jose St ‍‍‍	1	–	7	–	3	.227	1	–	13	–	5	.184
Air Force ‍‍‍	1	–	8	–	2	.182	5	–	10	–	3	.361
† – Conference champion ‡ – 2024 MW Tournament champion y – Invited to the NCAA Tournament; As of December 10, 2024; Rankings from United Soccer Coaches Poll; Source:Mountain West Conference

The 2024 Mountain West Conference women's soccer tournament was the postseason women's soccer tournament for the Mountain West Conference held from November 3 through November 9, 2024. The five-match tournament took place at SDSU Sports Deck in San Diego, California. The six-team single-elimination tournament consisted of three rounds based on seeding from regular season conference play. The Utah State Aggies were the defending champions. The Aggies successfully defended their title by defeating first seed Boise State in the Final, 2–1. This was the second Mountain West tournament championship for Utah State. They previously won two championships in the WAC. It was the second title for head coach Manny Martins. As tournament champions, Utah State earned the Mountain West's automatic berth into the 2024 NCAA Division I women's soccer tournament.

== Seeding ==
The top six Mountain West teams from regular season play qualified for the 2024 Tournament. Teams were seeded based on their regular season records. Tiebreakers were used to determine seeds if teams were tied on regular season record. A tiebreaker was required to determine the second and third seed, which determined the team that earned the second bye in the tournament. Colorado State and Utah State both finished the conference regular season with 7–1–3 records and on 24 points. The two teams tied their October 13 match-up 1–1. The second tiebreaker was goal difference in conference matches. Colorado state finished with a +11 goal difference and Utah State finished with a +20 goal difference. Therefore Utah State earned the second seed and a bye into the semifinals. Another tiebreaker was needed to determine the sixth and final team to qualify for the tournament as Colorado College and Nevada both finished with 4–5–2 records and on 14 points. Nevada earned the sixth and final spot in the tournament by virtue of their 5–0 win over Colorado College on October 6.

Seed	School	Conference Record	Points
1	Boise State	8–1–2	26
2	Utah State	7–1–3	24
3	Colorado State	7–1–3	24
4	San Diego State	6–2–3	21
5	UNLV	5–5–1	16
6	Nevada	4–5–2	14

== Bracket ==
First Round; Sunday, Nov. 3
4	San Diego State	3
5	UNLV	1
3	Colorado State	4
6	Nevada	1

Semifinals; Wednesday, Nov. 6
1	Boise State	3
4	San Diego State	2
2	Utah State	2
3	Colorado State	0

Final; Saturday, Nov. 9
1	Boise State	1
2	Utah State	2

== Schedule ==
=== First round ===
November 3, 2024	#3 Colorado State	4–1	#6 Nevada	San Diego, CA
4:00 p.m. PST	Mia Casey 19', 58'; Bridget Arnold 34'; Kaja Dionne 40'; Taite DeLange (yellow card) 44'; Kacie Laurie (yellow card) 88'	Report	36' Trinity Sandridge	Stadium: SDSU Sports Deck; Referee: Saul Rojas; Assistant referees: Alvaro Baez; Nathan Max; Fourth official: Magic Berenji

November 3, 2024	#4 San Diego St	3–1	#5 UNLV	San Diego, CA
7:00 p.m. PST	Denise Castro 2'; Kali Trevithick 15', 47'	Report	36' Tori Martinez	Stadium: SDSU Sports Deck; Attendance: 603; Referee: Vincent Brizzolara; Assistant referees: Alexandr Netrebchuk; Mehdi Alikasi; Fourth official: Magic Berenji

=== Semifinals ===
November 6, 2024	#2 Utah State	2–0	#3 Colorado State	San Diego, CA
4:00 p.m. PST	Ellie Hendrix 40'; Kate Christian 83'	Report		Stadium: SDSU Sports Deck; Referee: Sean Wright; Assistant referees: Emmanuel Padilla; Pamela Gonzalez; Fourth official: Irving Navarro

November 4, 2024	#1 Boise State	3–2	#4 San Diego State	San Diego, CA
7:00 p.m. PST	Carly Cross 48'; Morgan Padour 69'; Asia Lawyer 75'	Report	31' Grace Goins; 77' Kali Trevithick	Stadium: SDSU Sports Deck; Attendance: 671; Referee: Irving Navarro; Assistant referees: Nok-Hei Man; Marissa Postlewaite; Fourth official: Sean Wright

=== Final ===
November 9, 2024	#1 Boise State	1–2	#2 Utah State	San Diego, CA
6:00 p.m. PST	Jillian Anderson 21'; Avery McBride (yellow card) 66'; Grace Hancock (yellow card) 66'; Asia Lawyer (yellow card) 68'	Report	10', 25', (yellow card) 88' Kaylie Chambers	Stadium: SDSU Sports Deck; Attendance: 619; Referee: Brandon Stevis; Assistant referees: Wale Animashaun; Edwar Hernandez; Fourth official: Felix Granados

== Statistics ==
=== Goalscorers ===
There were 19 goals scored in 5 matches, for an average of 3.8 goals per match (as of November 9, 2024).

3 goals

- Kali Trevithick – San Diego State

2 goals

- Mia Casey – Colorado State
- Kaylie Chambers – Utah State

1 goal

- Jillian Anderson – Boise State
- Bridge Arnold – Colorado State
- Denise Castro – San Diego State
- Kate Christian – Utah State
- Carly Cross – Boise State
- Kaja Dionne – Colorado State
- Grace Goins – San Diego State
- Ellie Hendrix – Utah State
- Asia Lawyer – Boise State
- Tori Martinez – UNLV
- Morgan Padour – Boise State
- Trinity Sandridge – Nevada

== All-Tournament team ==
Player	Team
Genevieve Crenshaw	Boise State
Carly Cross	Boise State
Morgan Padour	Boise State
Mia Casey	Colorado State
Kaja Dionne	Colorado State
Alexa Maduena	San Diego State
Kali Trevithick	San Diego State
**Kaylie Chambers**	Utah State
Alex Day	Utah State
Ellie Hendrix	Utah State
Addy Weichers	Utah State

MVP in bold
