= 2021 Mountain West Conference women's soccer tournament =

- Classification: Division I
- Teams: 6
- Matches: 5
- Attendance: 2,239
- Site: Boas Tennis/Soccer Complex; Boise, Idaho
- Champions: New Mexico (2nd title)
- Winning coach: Rob Baarts (1st title)
- MVP: Zaria Katesigwa (New Mexico)
- Broadcast: MountainWest Sports Network

2021 Mountain West Conference women's soccer standings
	Conf.						Overall
Team	W		L		T	PCT	W		L		T	PCT
New Mexico ‍†‍‡‍^{y}	7	–	2	–	2	.727	14	–	5	–	2	.714
Fresno State ‍‍‍	7	–	3	–	1	.682	9	–	6	–	4	.579
San Diego State ‍‍‍	5	–	4	–	2	.545	7	–	11	–	2	.400
Utah State ‍‍‍	5	–	4	–	2	.545	13	–	6	–	3	.659
Colorado State ‍‍‍	5	–	5	–	1	.500	6	–	8	–	3	.441
Boise State ‍‍‍	4	–	4	–	3	.500	11	–	7	–	4	.591
Colorado College ‍‍‍	4	–	4	–	3	.500	5	–	10	–	3	.361
UNLV ‍‍‍	5	–	6	–	0	.455	12	–	8	–	0	.600
Nevada ‍‍‍	4	–	5	–	2	.455	5	–	11	–	2	.333
San Jose State ‍‍‍	4	–	6	–	1	.409	7	–	11	–	1	.395
Wyoming ‍‍‍	4	–	7	–	0	.364	8	–	10	–	1	.447
Air Force ‍‍‍	3	–	7	–	1	.318	6	–	10	–	2	.389
† – Conference champion ‡ – 2021 MW Tournament champion y – Invited to the NCAA tournament As of December 7, 2021; Rankings from United Soccer Coaches Poll; Source:Mountain West Conference

The 2021 Mountain West Conference women's soccer tournament was the postseason women's soccer tournament for the Mountain West Conference held from November 1 through November 6, 2021. The five-match tournament took place at Boas Tennis/Soccer Complex in Boise, Idaho. The six-team single-elimination tournament consisted of three rounds based on seeding from regular season conference play. Boise State won the tournament in 2019 and are classified as the defending champions because there was no tournament held in 2020 due to the COVID-19 pandemic. New Mexico were the regular season champions in 2020. Boise State was unable to defend their crown, losing to Fresno State on penalties in the Semifinals. New Mexico then defeated Fresno State in the finals 2–1 to win the title. This was the second tournament championship for New Mexico, their first since 2011. It was the first title for head coach Rob Baarts. As tournament champions, New Mexico earned the Mountain West's automatic berth into the 2021 NCAA Division I Women's Soccer Tournament.

== Seeding ==
The top six teams from regular season play qualified for the 2021 Tournament. Teams were seeded based on their regular season records. Tiebreakers were used to determine seeds if teams were tied on regular season record. San Diego State and Utah State tied for third in the regular season standings. San Diego State earned the third seed in the tournament by virtue of their 2–0 win over Utah State on October 3. Boise State and Colorado College tied for sixth during the regular season and the final tournament spot. The teams tied their regular season match-up on October 14. Boise State won the second tiebreaker and earned the final spot in the tournament.

Seed	School	Conference Record	Points
1	New Mexico	7–2–2	23
2	Fresno State	7–3–1	22
3	San Diego State	5–4–2	17
4	Utah State	5–4–2	17
5	Colorado State	5–5–1	16
6	Boise State	4–4–3	15

== Bracket ==
Quarterfinals; Monday, Nov. 1
4	Utah State	1
5	Colorado State	0
3	San Diego State	0
6	Boise State	1

Semifinals; Thursday, Nov. 4
1	New Mexico (a.e.t.)	2
4	Utah State	1
2	Fresno State	1 (5)
6	Boise State (pen.)	1 (6)

Final; Saturday, Nov. 6
1	New Mexico (a.e.t.)	2
6	Boise State	1

== Schedule ==
=== Quarterfinals ===
November 1, 2021	#4 Utah State	1–0	#5 Colorado State	Boise, Idaho
11:00 a.m. MT	Ashley Cardozo 50'; Sammie Murdock (yellow card) 89'	Report	(yellow card) 85' Kenady Leighton	Stadium: Boas Tennis/Soccer Complex; Attendance: 200; Referee: Kali Smith; Assistant referees: Jason Steiner; Robert Farmer; Fourth official: Nicole Steiner

November 1, 2021	#3 San Diego State	0–1	#6 Boise State	Boise, Idaho
2:00 p.m. MT	Anna Toohey (red card) 51'	Report	23', (yellow card) 48' Morgan Miles; (yellow card) 51' Abby Bivens; (yellow card) 73' Macie Nelson; (yellow card) 86' Reese Bodas	Stadium: Boas Tennis/Soccer Complex; Attendance: 350; Referee: Sly Yates; Assistant referees: Nicole Steiner; Brian Weiss; Fourth official: Jason Steiner

=== Semifinals ===
November 4, 2021	#1 New Mexico	2–1 (a.e.t.)	#4 Utah State	Boise, Idaho
11:00 a.m. MT	Myah Isais (yellow card) 44'; Jadyn Edwards 69'; Zaria Katesigwa 102'	Report	(yellow card) 85' Whitney Lopez; 90' Kami Warner	Stadium: Boas Tennis/Soccer Complex; Attendance: 165; Referee: Jamie Padilla; Assistant referees: Brian Weiss; Eli Asanti; Fourth official: Kristin Patterson

November 4, 2021	#2 Fresno State	1–1 (a.e.t.) (5–6 p)	#6 Boise State	Boise, Idaho
2:00 p.m. MT	Kaelyn Miller 17'; Robyn McCarthy (yellow card) 109'	Report	28', (yellow card) 30' Aubree Chatterton; (yellow card) 30' Grace Kaufman-Fuller	Stadium: Boas Tennis/Soccer Complex; Attendance: 324; Referee: Kristin Patterson; Assistant referees: Robert Farmer; Nicole Steiner; Fourth official: Jaime Padilla
	Penalties
	Katie Dohnel (penalty scored); Kassandra Ceja (penalty scored); Jordan Brown (penalty scored); Shantay Tamez (penalty scored); Jaylyn Wright (penalty scored); Kaelyn Miller (penalty missed)		(penalty scored) Morgan Miles; (penalty scored) Sydney Smith; (penalty scored) Morgan Stone; (penalty scored) Abby Bivens; (penalty scored) Jocelyn Stephens; (penalty scored) Michaela Jusitniani

=== Final ===
November 6, 2021	#1 New Mexico	2–1 (a.e.t.)	#6 Boise State	Boise, Idaho
12:00 p.m. MT	Madi Hirschman 33'; Paige Satterlee (yellow card) 62'; Jadyn Edwards 91'	Report	79' Morgan Stone	Stadium: Boas Tennis/Soccer Complex; Attendance: 1,200

== Statistics ==
=== Goalscorers ===
There were 10 goals scored in 5 matches, for an average of 2 goals per match (as of November 6, 2021).

2 goals

- Jadyn Edwards – New Mexico

1 goal

- Aubree Chatterton – Boise State
- Morgan Miles – Boise State
- Morgan Stone – Boise State
- Kaelyn Miller – Fresno State
- Madi Hirschman – New Mexico
- Zaria Katesigwa – New Mexico
- Ashley Cardozo – Utah State
- Kami Warner – Utah State

== All-Tournament team ==
Player	Team
**Zaria Katesigwa**	New Mexico
Jadyn Edwards	New Mexico
Karlee Maes	New Mexico
Alexa Kirton	New Mexico
Aubree Chatterton	Boise State
Macie Nelson	Boise State
Sydney Smith	Boise State
Kaelyn Miller	Fresno State
Robyn McCarthy	Fresno State
Ashley Cardozo	Utah State
Kelsey Steed-Kaufusi	Utah State

MVP in bold
