= 2023 Mountain West Conference women's soccer tournament =

- Classification: Division I
- Teams: 6
- Matches: 5
- Attendance: 524
- Site: Madrid Sports Complex; Laramie, Wyoming
- Champions: Utah State (1st title)
- Winning coach: Manny Martins (1st title)
- MVP: Whitney Lopez (Utah State)
- Broadcast: MountainWest Sports Network

2023 Mountain West Conference women's soccer standings
	Conf.						Overall
Team	W		L		T	PCT	W		L		T	PCT
San Diego State ‍†‍‍	9	–	1	–	1	.864	14	–	3	–	3	.775
Utah State ‍‍‡‍^{y}	9	–	2	–	0	.818	14	–	8	–	1	.630
Boise State ‍‍‍	8	–	2	–	1	.773	11	–	3	–	6	.700
Colorado State ‍‍‍	6	–	3	–	2	.636	12	–	6	–	4	.636
Fresno State ‍‍‍	4	–	4	–	3	.500	5	–	9	–	6	.400
Nevada ‍‍‍	4	–	6	–	1	.409	6	–	10	–	5	.405
UNLV ‍‍‍	3	–	5	–	3	.409	7	–	7	–	6	.500
Air Force ‍‍‍	3	–	5	–	3	.409	6	–	9	–	3	.417
New Mexico ‍‍‍	2	–	5	–	4	.364	5	–	6	–	6	.471
Colorado College ‍‍‍	3	–	7	–	1	.318	3	–	13	–	2	.222
Wyoming ‍‍‍	2	–	7	–	2	.273	6	–	8	–	5	.447
San Jose State ‍‍‍	1	–	7	–	3	.227	3	–	10	–	6	.316
† – Conference champion ‡ – 2023 MW Tournament champion y – Invited to the NCAA Tournament; As of December 5, 2023; Rankings from United Soccer Coaches Poll; Source: Mountain West Conference

The 2023 Mountain West Conference women's soccer tournament was the postseason women's soccer tournament for the Mountain West Conference held from October 29 through November 4, 2023. The five-match tournament took place at Madrid Sports Complex in Laramie, Wyoming. The six-team single-elimination tournament consisted of three rounds based on seeding from regular season conference play. The San Jose State Spartans were the defending champions. The Spartans were unable to defend their crown, as they did not qualify for the tournament and finished last in the regular season. Utah State won the title after defeating Colorado State in the Final, 1–0. This was the first Mountain West tournament championship for Utah State. They previously won two championships in the WAC. It was the first title for head coach Manny Martins. As tournament champions, Utah State earned the Mountain West's automatic berth into the 2023 NCAA Division I Women's Soccer Tournament.

== Seeding ==
The top six teams from regular season play qualified for the 2023 Tournament. Teams were seeded based on their regular season records. Tiebreakers were used to determine seeds if teams were tied on regular season record. However, no teams finished tied at the end of the regular season so no tiebreakers were required.

Seed	School	Conference Record	Points
1	San Diego State	9–1–1	28
2	Utah State	9–2–0	27
3	Boise State	8–2–1	25
4	Colorado State	6–3–2	20
5	Fresno State	4–4–3	15
6	Nevada	4–6–1	13

== Bracket ==
First Round; Sunday, Oct. 29
4	Colorado State	2
5	Fresno State	0
3	Boise State	3
6	Nevada	0

Semifinals; Wednesday, Nov. 1
1	San Diego State	0 (2)
4	Colorado State (pen.)	0 (3)
2	Utah State (a.e.t.)	1
3	Boise State	0

Final; Saturday, Nov. 4
4	Colorado State	0
2	Utah State	1

== Schedule ==
=== First round ===
October 29	#3 Boise State	2–0	#6 Nevada	Laramie, WY
11:00 a.m. MT	Kenzie MacMillan 16'; Sophie Drown 34'; Payton McBride (yellow card) 72'	Report	(yellow card) 64' Gabby Brown	Stadium: Madrid Sports Complex; Attendance: 25; Referee: Karen Abt; Assistant referees: Kevin Lewis; Brian Yip; Fourth official: Bol Abiar

October 29	#4 Colorado State	2–0	#5 Fresno State	Laramie, WY
2:00 p.m. MT	Liv Stutzman 49'; Olivia Fout 57'	Report		Stadium: Madrid Sports Complex; Attendance: 58; Referee: William Knause; Assistant referees: Bol Abiar; Kastriot Baruni; Fourth official: Kevin Lewis

=== Semifinals ===
November 1	#2 Utah State	1–0 (a.e.t.)	#3 Boise State	Laramie, WY
11:00 a.m. MT	Kelsey Kaufusi (yellow card) 63'; Kate Christian (yellow card) 64'; Addy Symonds-Weichers (yellow card) 88'; Team (yellow card) 88'; Whitney Lopez 94'	Report	(yellow card) 94' Kenzie MacMillan; (yellow card) 96' Cindy Conner; (yellow card) 110' Patyon McBride	Stadium: Madrid Sports Complex; Attendance: 78; Referee: Megan McCain; Assistant referees: Andrea Jones; James Mays; Fourth official: Ryan Wilde

November 1	#1 San Diego State	0–0 (a.e.t.) (2–3 p)	#4 Colorado State	Laramie, WY
2:00 p.m. MT		Report		Stadium: Madrid Sports Complex; Attendance: 56; Referee: Mindy Lamboni; Assistant referees: Harlan Grossman; Ryan Wilde; Fourth official: James Mayes
	Penalties
	Kiera Utush (penalty scored); Olivia Sekimoto (penalty missed); Kali Trevithick (penalty scored); Dori Savage (penalty missed); Alexys Ocampo (penalty missed)		(penalty scored) Mia Casey; (penalty scored) Sofia Coulombe; (penalty missed) Mia Massey; (penalty scored) Taite DeLange

=== Final ===
November 4	#2 Utah State	1–0	#4 Colorado State	Laramie, WY
12:00 p.m. MT	Kate Christian 78'	Report		Stadium: Madrid Sports Complex; Attendance: 307; Referee: Jeff Arthurholtz; Assistant referees: Jocab Herold; Jason Hampton; Fourth official: Max Alatorre

== Statistics ==
=== Goalscorers ===
There were 6 goals scored in 5 matches, for an average of 1.2 goals per match (as of November 4, 2023).

1 goal

- Sophie Drown – Boise State
- Kenize MacMillan – Boise State
- Olivia Fout – Colorado State
- Liv Stutzman – Colorado State
- Kate Christian – Utah State
- Whitney Lopez – Utah State

== All-Tournament team ==
Player	Team
Genevieve Crenshaw	Boise State
Teryn Newkirk	Boise State
Mia Casey	Colorado State
Shayna Ross	Colorado State
Liv Stutzman	Colorado State
Carlin Blake	San Diego State
Kiera Utush	San Diego State
**Whitney Lopez**	Utah State
Kaitlyn Richins	Utah State
Addy Symonds-Weichers	Utah State
Diera Walton	Utah State

MVP in bold
