= 2026 Rainbow Wahine volleyball team =

American college women's volleyball season

2026 Hawaii Rainbow Wahine volleyball

Mountain West Regular Season Champions
- Conference: Mountain West Conference
- Record: 22–4 (13-1 Mountain West)
- Head coach: Joshua Walker (1st season)
- Associate head coach: Heather Olmstead (1st season)
- Assistant coaches: Kolby Kanetake (1st season); Will McDonald (1st season)
- Home stadium: Stan Sheriff Center

2026 Mountain West Conference women's volleyball standings
| | Conf. | | | | Overall |
| Team | W | | L | PCT | W | | L | PCT |
|---|---|---|---|---|---|---|---|---|
| Hawaii ‍‍‍ | 2 | – | 0 | 1.000 | 10 | – | 3 | .769 |
| UTEP ‍‍‍ | 2 | – | 0 | 1.000 | 10 | – | 4 | .714 |
| Air Force ‍‍‍ | 2 | – | 0 | 1.000 | 6 | – | 7 | .462 |
| UC Davis ‍‍‍ | 2 | – | 0 | 1.000 | 6 | – | 7 | .462 |
| Grand Canyon ‍‍‍ | 1 | – | 1 | .500 | 7 | – | 6 | .538 |
| Nevada ‍‍‍ | 1 | – | 1 | .500 | 3 | – | 9 | .250 |
| Wyoming ‍‍‍ | 0 | – | 2 | .000 | 7 | – | 6 | .538 |
| San Jose State ‍‍‍ | 0 | – | 2 | .000 | 5 | – | 8 | .385 |
| UNLV ‍‍‍ | 0 | – | 2 | .000 | 4 | – | 9 | .308 |
| New Mexico ‍‍‍ | 0 | – | 2 | .000 | 2 | – | 10 | .167 |
As of September 27, 2026; Rankings from Mountain West

The 2026 Hawaii Rainbow Wahine women's volleyball team is the varsity intercollegiate volleyball program of the University of Hawaii at Mānoa (UH). The Rainbow Wahine, led by head coach Joshua Walker, play their home games in the Stan Sheriff Center located on campus in Honolulu, Hawaii. The University of Hawaii at Mānoa has been a member of the Mountain West Conference since the 2026-27 season.

== Previous season ==
Last season, the University of Hawaii finished with a 12–17 record, going 8–10 in the Big West, and finished second in the conference. Hawaii finished the season unranked.

== Preseason ==
Both the preseason Mountain West team and the Mountain West Preseason Poll were released on August 19, 2026. Hawaii was picked to finish fifth and had one player make the preseason team.

=== Mountain West Preseason Poll ===
Preseason Poll
| Pos. | Team | Points |
|---|---|---|
| 1 | UTEP | 84 (4) |
| 2 | UC Davis | 80 (4) |
| 3 | Grand Canyon | 70 (2) |
| 4 | Wyoming | 69 |
| 5 | Hawai'i | 67 |
| 6 | UNLV | 53 |
| 7 | San Jose | 40 |
| 8 | Air Force | 36 |
| 9 | Nevada | 26 |
| 10 | New Mexico | 25 |

Preseason Mountain West Team
| Player | No. | Position | Class |
| Cha'lei Reid | 10 | Outside Hitter | Sophomore |

== Roster ==
2026 Hawaii Rainbow Wahine Roster
| No. | Name | Position | Height | Year | Hometown |
|---|---|---|---|---|---|
| 1 | Mano Antiga | OH/OPP | 6'0" | Fr. | Lublin, Poland. |
| 2 | Victoria Leyva | L/DS | 5'7" | Jr. | El Paso, Texas |
| 3 | Adrianna Arquette | S | 5'10" | Jr. | Kailua, O'ahu. |
| 4 | Kahea Moriwaki | L/DS | 5'2" | So. | Mililani, O'ahu |
| 5 | Jaci Miyasaki | L/DS | 5'2" | So. | Honolulu, O'ahu |
| 6 | Marnie Ursem | MB | 6'3" | Jr. | Orewa, New Zealand |
| 8 | Manon Baudrillard | S | 6'0" | Fr. | Paris, France |
| 9 | Tali Hakas | OH | 5'11" | Jr. | Kfar Saba, Israel |
| 10 | Cha'lei Reid | OH | 6'0" | So. | La'ie, O'ahu |
| 11 | Maëli Cormier | OH/OPP | 6'2" | So. | Quebec, Canada |
| 12 | Miliana Sylvester | MB | 6'1" | Jr. | Honolulu, O'ahu |
| 15 | Leilani Lopez | L/DS | 5'8" | Sr. | Torrance, Calif. |
| 16 | Cameron Holcomb | L/DS | 5'7" | Fr. | San Diego, Calif. |
| 19 | Rachel Purser | MB | 6'3" | Fr. | Las Vegas, Nev. |
| 22 | Panna Ratkai | OH | 5'10" | Sr. | Budapest, Hungary |

=== Coaches ===
2026 Hawaii Rainbow Wahine Coaching Staff
| Position | Name | Season |
|---|---|---|
| Head Coach | Joshua Walker | 1st |
| Associate Head Coach | Heather Olmstead | 1st |
| Assistant coach 1 | Kolby Kanetake | 1st |
| Assistant coach 2 | Will McDonald | 1st |

== Schedule ==
2026 Hawaii Rainbow Wahine Schedule 16-3 (8-0 MW)
| Date Time | TV Radio | Opponents | Rank | Stadiums | Scores | Sets | Attendance | Overall | Mountain West |
|---|---|---|---|---|---|---|---|---|---|
| Aug. 15 2:00 pm | — | Hawaii Hilo (Exhibition) | — | Stan Sheriff Center Honolulu, HI | Cancelled | | | — | — |
| Aug. 17 7:00 pm | — | Chaminade | — | Stan Sheriff Center Honolulu, HI | W, 3-0 | 25-20 25–16 25–10 | — | — | — |
Hawaiian Airlines Wahine Volleyball Classic
| Aug. 28 7:00 pm | K5/MW+ | Georgia Southern | — | Stan Sheriff Center Honolulu, HI | W, 3-1 | 25-18 25–20 17–25 25-18 | 5542 | 1-0 | — |
| Aug. 29 7:00 pm | K5/MW+ | No. 21 Baylor | — | Stan Sheriff Center Honolulu, HI | L, 2-3 | 17-25 25-14 22-25 25-23 9-15 | 5952 | 1-1 | — |
| Jan. 14 11:00 am | K5/MW+ | San Diego | — | Stan Sheriff Center Honolulu, HI | L, 0-3 | 16-25 17-25 18-25 | 5430 | 1-2 | — |
OUTRIGGER Invitational
| Sep. 3 7:00 pm | K5/MW+ | Utah Tech | — | Stan Sheriff Center Honolulu, HI | W, 3-0 | 25-17 25-11 26-24 | 5148 | 2-2 | — |
| Sep. 4 7:00 pm | K5/MW+ | LMU | — | Stan Sheriff Center Honolulu, HI | W, 3-2 | 25-10 25-18 22-25 26-28 15-11 | 5227 | 3-2 | — |
| Sep. 6 5:00 pm | K5/MW+ | UC San Diego | — | Stan Sheriff Center Honolulu, HI | W, 3-2 | 22-25 25-15 21-25 26-24 15-8 | 6000 | 4-2 | — |
| Sep. 10 7:00 pm | K5/MW+ | Central Arkansas | — | Stan Sheriff Center Honolulu, HI | W, 3-0 | 25-12 25-17 25-18 | 4535 | 5-2 | — |
| Sep. 11 7:00 pm | K5/MW+ | Central Arkansas | — | Stan Sheriff Center Honolulu, HI | W, 3-0 | 25-14 25-20 28-26 | 5096 | 6-2 | — |
Lucky Aces Women's Volleyball Invitational
| Sep 18 3:30 pm | K5/MW+ | Texas A&M - Corpus Christi | — | Orleans Arena Las Vegas, NV | W, 3-0 | 25-17 25-13 25-13 | 780 | 7-2 | — |
| Sep. 19 1:30 pm | K5/MW+ | Iowa State | — | Orleans Arena Las Vegas, NV | W, 3-2 | 25-20 15-25 25-11 19-25 15-11 | — | 8-2 | — |
| Sep. 20 11:30 pm | K5/MW+ | UCLA | — | Orleans Arena Las Vegas, NV | L, 2-3 | 25-19 22-25 25-20 17-25 16-18 | — | 8-3 | — |
Mountain West Conference Matches
| Sep. 25 7:00 pm | K5/MW+ | New Mexico | — | Stan Sheriff Center Honolulu, HI | W, 3-0 | 25-17 25-13 25-21 | 5611 | 9-3 | 1-0 |
| Sep. 26 7:00 pm | K5/MW+ | New Mexico | — | Stan Sheriff Center Honolulu, HI | W, 3-0 | 25-20 25-18 25-18 | 5862 | 10-3 | 2-0 |
| Oct. 2 3:00 pm | MW+ | @ Grand Canyon | — | Global Credit Union Arena Phoenix, AZ | W, 3-0 | 25-23 25-23 25-20 | 1425 | 11-3 | 3-0 |
| Oct. 3 3:00 pm | MW+ | @ Grand Canyon | — | Global Credit Union Arena Phoenix, AZ | W, 3-0 | 25-23 25-21 25-10 | 2561 | 12-3 | 4-0 |
| Oct. 9 7:00 pm | K5/MW+ | San Jose State | — | Stan Sheriff Center Honolulu, HI | W, 3-0 | 25-14 25-14 25-21 | 6083 | 13-3 | 5-0 |
| Oct. 10 7:00 pm | K5/MW+ | San Jose State | — | Stan Sheriff Center Honolulu, HI | W, 3-0 | 25-20 25-13 25-13 | 7009 | 14-3 | 6-0 |
| Oct. 15 2:30 pm | MW+ | @ Wyoming | — | Laramie, WY | W, 3-2 | 25-13 19-25 26-28 25-18 17-15 | 613 | 15-3 | 7-0 |
| Oct. 17 2:30 pm | MW+ | @ Wyoming | — | Laramie, WY | W, 3-1 | 26-28 25-18 25-22 25-12 | 1200 | 16-3 | 8-0 |
| Oct. 23 7:00 pm | K5/MW+ | UNLV | — | Stan Sheriff Center Honolulu, HI | — | — | — | — | — |
| Oct. 24 7:00 pm | K5/MW+ | UNLV | — | Stan Sheriff Center Honolulu, HI | — | — | — | — | — |
| Oct. 30 3:00 pm | MW+ | @ UC Davis | | University Credit Union Center Davis, CA | — | — | — | — | — |
| Oct. 31 3:00 pm | MW+ | @ UC Davis | — | University Credit Union Center Davis, CA | — | — | — | — | — |
| Nov. 5 7:00 pm | K5/MW+ | Nevada | — | Stan Sheriff Center Honolulu, HI | — | — | — | — | — |
| Nov. 7 7:00 pm | K5/MW+ | Nevada | — | Stan Sheriff Center Honolulu, HI | — | — | — | — | — |
| Nov. 12 7:00 pm | K5/MW+ | Air Force | — | Stan Sheriff Center Honolulu, HI | — | — | — | — | — |
| Nov. 13 7:00 pm | K5/MW+ | Air Force | — | Stan Sheriff Center Honolulu, HI | — | — | — | — | — |
| Nov. 18 3:00 pm | MW+ | @ UTEP | — | Memorial Gym El Paso, TX | — | — | — | — | — |
| Nov. 19 3:00 pm | MW+ | @ UTEP | — | Memorial Gym El Paso, TX | — | — | — | — | — |
CU1 Mountain West Women's Volleyball Championship

== Awards ==
=== Post-Season Awards ===
Awards and accolades will be added once the season is finished
