= 2018 Mountain West Conference women's soccer tournament =

- Classification: Division I
- Teams: 6
- Matches: 5
- Attendance: 1,732
- Site: Spartan Soccer Complex; San Jose, California
- Champions: San Jose State (2nd title)
- Winning coach: Lauren Hanson (2nd title)
- MVP: Paige Simoneau (San Jose State)
- Broadcast: Mountain West Network

2018 Mountain West Conference women's soccer standings
	Conf.						Overall
Team	W		L		T	PCT	W		L		T	PCT
Boise State ‍†‍‍	7	–	2	–	2	.727	13	–	4	–	3	.725
Wyoming ‍†‍‍	7	–	2	–	2	.727	12	–	4	–	4	.700
New Mexico ‍†‍‍	7	–	2	–	2	.727	13	–	6	–	2	.667
San Jose St ‍‍‡‍^{y}	6	–	2	–	3	.682	9	–	6	–	6	.571
Fresno State ‍‍‍	5	–	3	–	3	.591	6	–	10	–	4	.400
Colorado College ‍‍‍	5	–	4	–	2	.545	9	–	7	–	2	.556
UNLV ‍‍‍	5	–	4	–	2	.545	11	–	6	–	3	.625
San Diego St ‍‍‍	4	–	4	–	3	.500	6	–	10	–	3	.395
Colorado St ‍‍‍	3	–	6	–	2	.364	6	–	9	–	4	.421
Utah State ‍‍‍	2	–	7	–	2	.273	3	–	13	–	2	.222
Air Force ‍‍‍	1	–	7	–	3	.227	2	–	9	–	6	.294
Nevada ‍‍‍	1	–	10	–	0	.091	4	–	13	–	2	.263
† – Conference champion ‡ – 2018 MW Tournament champion y – Invited to the NCAA Tournament; As of November 14, 2018; Rankings from United Soccer Coaches Poll; Source:Mountain West Conference

The 2018 Mountain West Conference women's soccer tournament was the postseason women's soccer tournament for the Mountain West Conference held from October 30 through November 3, 2018. The five-match tournament took place at Spartan Soccer Complex in San Jose, California. The six-team single-elimination tournament consisted of three rounds based on seeding from regular season conference play. The San Diego State Aztecs were the defending champions but will not defend their title after having failed to qualify for the 2018 tournament. The San Jose State Spartans won the tournament with a 1–0 win over the New Mexico Lobos in the final. This was the second tournament championship for San Jose State, both of which have come under coach Lauren Hanson.

== Bracket ==
Quarterfinals; Tuesday, Oct. 30
3	New Mexico	3
6	Colorado College	2
4	San Jose St	2
5	Fresno State	1

Semifinals; Thursday, Nov. 1
2	Wyoming	1
3	New Mexico	2^{2OT}
1	Boise State	1 (3)
4	San Jose St	1 (4)

Final; Saturday, Nov. 3
3	New Mexico	0
4	San Jose St	1

== Schedule ==
=== Quarterfinals ===
October 30, 2018	#3 New Mexico	3–2	#6 Colorado College	San Jose, California
4:00 p.m. PDT	Jaelyn Hendren 1'; Jennifer Munoz 29'; Jill Olguin 66'	Report	Lauren Millet 21'; Kiley Suter 44'; Lucia Costanza (yellow card) 79'	Stadium: Spartan Soccer Complex; Attendance: 200; Referee: Chris Elliot; Assistant referees: Sarah Corez; Eder Del Angel; Fourth official: Victor Mba

October 30, 2018	#4 San Jose St	2–1	#5 Fresno State	San Jose, California
7:00 p.m. PDT	Kiara Parker (yellow card) 3'; Kristen Amarikwa 12'; Gabriela Herrera (yellow card) 14'; Jamilecxth Becerra 21', (yellow card) 23'; Natalia Nava (yellow card) 43'	Report	Robyn McCarthy 15'	Stadium: Spartan Soccer Complex; Attendance: 353; Referee: Omeed Azadpour; Assistant referees: Victor Mba; Nick Marin; Fourth official: Eder Del Angel

=== Semifinals ===
November 1, 2018	#2 Wyoming	1–2 (a.e.t.)	#3 New Mexico	San Jose, California
4:00 p.m. PDT	Michaela Stark 78'	Report	Jill Olguin 33'; Alesia Garcia 101'	Stadium: Spartan Soccer Complex; Attendance: 107; Referee: Alex Del Angel; Assistant referees: Jamie Padilla; Edgar Del Angel; Fourth official: Devlin Creigton

November 1, 2018	#1 Boise State	1–1 (a.e.t.) (3–4 p)	#4 San Jose St	San Jose, California
7:00 p.m. PDT	Addison Standlee 20'	Report	Gabriela Herrera 42'; Kristen Amarikwa (yellow card) 102'; Lauola Amanoni (yellow card) 103'	Stadium: Spartan Soccer Complex; Attendance: 443; Referee: Rob Hullner; Assistant referees: Devlin Creighton; Ian Johnson; Fourth official: Jamie Padilla
	Penalties
	Raimee Sherle (penalty scored); McKenna Kynett (penalty scored); Eva Herrera (penalty scored); Aubre Chatterton (penalty missed); Mikayl Schachtell (penalty missed)		Kiara Parker (penalty scored); Carlie James (penalty missed); Karlee Pottoroff (penalty scored); Gabriella Hurtado (penalty scored); Darriell Franklin (penalty scored)

=== Final ===
November 3, 2018	#3 New Mexico	0–1	#4 San Jose St	San Jose, California
7:00 p.m. PDT		Report	Haleigh Wynne 22'	Stadium: Spartan Soccer Complex; Attendance: 629; Referee: Jeff Arthurholtz; Assistant referees: Sarah Cortez; Stephen McGonagle; Fourth official: Saul Espinoza

== Statistics ==
=== Goalscorers ===
2 Goals

- Jill Olguin - New Mexico

1 Goal

- Kristen Amarikwa - San Jose St
- Jamilecxth Becerra - San Jose St
- Jaelyn Hendren - New Mexico
- Gabriela Herrera - San Jose St
- Alesia Garcia - New Mexico
- Robyn McCarthy - Fresno State
- Lauren Millet - Colorado College
- Jennifer Munoz - New Mexico
- Addison Standlee - Boise State
- Michaela Stark - Wyoming
- Kiley Suter - Colorado College
- Haleigh Wynne - San Jose St

== All-Tournament team ==
Player	Team
Paige Simoneau	San Jose State (MVP)
Kristen Amarikwa	San Jose State
Jamilecxth Becerra	San Jose State
Natasha Harris	San Jose State
Addison Standlee	Boise State
Allegra Weeks	Boise State
Gwen Maly	New Mexico
Jessica Nelson	New Mexico
Jessie Hix	New Mexico
Brittney Stark	Wyoming
Summer Taube	Wyoming
