= 2026 FIFA World Cup base camps =

Base camps were used by the 48 national squads to stay and train before and during the 2026 FIFA World Cup tournament.

Similar to the prohibition of naming-rights sponsors that apply to the competition venues, the names of some training facilities were also altered by FIFA.

== Map ==
Map of team base camps

== List of team base camps ==
List of team base camps
Team	Hotel		Training site	
Team	Name	City	Name	City
Algeria	DoubleTree by Hilton Hotel Lawrence	Lawrence, Kansas	Rock Chalk Park, University of Kansas	Lawrence, Kansas
Argentina	Origin Kansas City Riverfront	Kansas City, Missouri	Sporting KC Training Center	Kansas City, Kansas
Australia	Claremont Hotel & Spa	Berkeley, California	Oakland Roots/Soul Training Facility	Alameda, California
Austria	Bacara Resort	Goleta, California	Harder Stadium, University of California, Santa Barbara	Santa Barbara, California
Belgium	Hyatt Regency Lake Washington at Seattle's Southport	Renton, Washington	Seattle Sounders FC Performance Center and Clubhouse	Renton, Washington
Bosnia and Herzegovina	Asher Adams, Autograph Collection	Salt Lake City, Utah	Real Salt Lake Stadium	Sandy, Utah
Brazil	The Ridge	Basking Ridge, New Jersey	Columbia Park	Morristown, New Jersey
Canada	The Westin Bayshore	Vancouver, British Columbia	National Soccer Development Centre	Vancouver, British Columbia
Cape Verde	Grand Hyatt Tampa Bay	Tampa, Florida	Waters Sportsplex	Tampa, Florida
Colombia	Grand Fiesta Americana Country Club	Guadalajara, Jalisco	Academia Atlas FC	Zapopan, Jalisco
Croatia	Hotel AKA Alexandria	Alexandria, Virginia	Episcopal High School	Alexandria, Virginia
Curaçao	Boca Raton Marriott at Boca Center	Boca Raton, Florida	FAU Soccer Stadium, Florida Atlantic University	Boca Raton, Florida
Czech Republic	Hilton Garden Inn Dallas-Arlington South	Arlington, Texas	Mansfield Multipurpose Stadium	Mansfield, Texas
DR Congo	Omni Houston Hotel	Houston, Texas	SaberCats Stadium	Houston, Texas
Ecuador	Le Méridien Columbus, The Joseph	Columbus, Ohio	Columbus Crew Performance Center	Columbus, Ohio
Egypt	Northern Quest Resort & Casino	Airway Heights, Washington	Luger Field, Gonzaga University	Spokane, Washington
England	The Inn at Meadowbrook	Prairie Village, Kansas	Swope Soccer Village	Kansas City, Missouri
France	Four Seasons Hotel Boston	Boston, Massachusetts	Bentley Soccer Field, Bentley University	Waltham, Massachusetts
Germany	Graylyn	Winston-Salem, North Carolina	W. Dennie Spry Soccer Stadium, Wake Forest University	Winston-Salem, North Carolina
Ghana	Providence Biltmore	Providence, Rhode Island	Beirne Stadium, Bryant University	Smithfield, Rhode Island
Haiti	Sheraton Atlantic City Convention Center Hotel	Atlantic City, New Jersey	G. Larry James Stadium, Stockton University	Galloway Township, New Jersey
Iran	Tijuana Marriott Hotel	Tijuana, Baja California	Club Tijuana Training Center	Tijuana, Baja California
Iraq	Greenbrier Resort	White Sulphur Springs, West Virginia	The Greenbrier Sports Performance Centre	White Sulphur Springs, West Virginia
Ivory Coast	Hotel Du Pont	Wilmington, Delaware	Philadelphia Union Stadium	Chester, Pennsylvania
Japan	Embassy Suites by Hilton Nashville Downtown	Nashville, Tennessee	Nashville SC Training Center	Nashville, Tennessee
Jordan	The Nines Hotel	Portland, Oregon	Merlo Field, University of Portland	Portland, Oregon
Mexico	Centro de Alto Rendimiento on-site accommodation	Mexico City	Centro de Alto Rendimiento	Mexico City
Morocco	Somerset Hills Hotel, Tapestry Collection by Hilton	Warren, New Jersey	Pingry School	Basking Ridge, New Jersey
Netherlands	Cascade Hotel, Kansas City, a Tribute Portfolio Hotel	Kansas City, Missouri	Kansas City Current Training Facility	Riverside, Missouri
New Zealand	Hyatt Regency La Jolla at Aventine	San Diego, California	Torero Stadium, University of San Diego	San Diego, California
Norway	Grandover Resort & Spa, A Wyndham Grand Hotel	Greensboro, North Carolina	UNCG Soccer Stadium, University of North Carolina at Greensboro	Greensboro, North Carolina
Panama	Nottawasaga Inn Resort & Conference Centre	New Tecumseth, Ontario	Nottawasaga Training Site	New Tecumseth, Ontario
Paraguay	Signia by Hilton San Jose	San Jose, California	Spartan Soccer Complex, San Jose State University	San Jose, California
Portugal	Four Seasons Hotel Palm Beach	Palm Beach, Florida	Gardens North County District Park	Palm Beach Gardens, Florida
Qatar	Courtyard by Marriott Santa Barbara Goleta	Goleta, California	Thorrington Athletic Field, Westmont College	Santa Barbara, California
Saudi Arabia	Four Seasons Hotel Austin	Austin, Texas	Austin FC Stadium	Austin, Texas
Scotland	Renaissance Charlotte SouthPark Hotel	Charlotte, North Carolina	Charlotte FC Training Center	Charlotte, North Carolina
Senegal	The Heldrich Hotel and Conference Center	New Brunswick, New Jersey	Yurcak Field, Rutgers University	Piscataway, New Jersey
South Africa	Camino Real Pachuca	Pachuca, Hidalgo	Universidad del Fútbol y Ciencias del Deporte	San Agustín Tlaxiaca, Hidalgo
South Korea	The Westin Guadalajara	Guadalajara, Jalisco	Chivas Verde Valle	Zapopan, Jalisco
Spain	The Read House Hotel	Chattanooga, Tennessee	Baylor School	Chattanooga, Tennessee
Sweden	The Westin Dallas Stonebriar Golf Resort & Spa	Frisco, Texas	FC Dallas Stadium	Frisco, Texas
Switzerland	Fairmont Grand Del Mar	San Diego, California	San Diego Jewish Academy	San Diego, California
Tunisia	InterContinental Presidente Monterrey	San Pedro Garza García, Nuevo León	Rayados Training Center	Santiago, Nuevo León
Turkey	Courtyard Mesa at Wrigleyville West	Mesa, Arizona	Arizona Athletic Grounds	Mesa, Arizona
United States	Marriott Irvine Spectrum	Irvine, California	Orange County Great Park	Irvine, California
Uruguay	Fairmont Mayakoba	Playa del Carmen, Quintana Roo	Mayakoba Training Centre	Playa del Carmen, Quintana Roo
Uzbekistan	JW Marriott Atlanta Buckhead	Atlanta, Georgia	Atlanta United FC Training Center	Marietta, Georgia
