= Scott Barnes (athletic director) =

American college athletics administrator

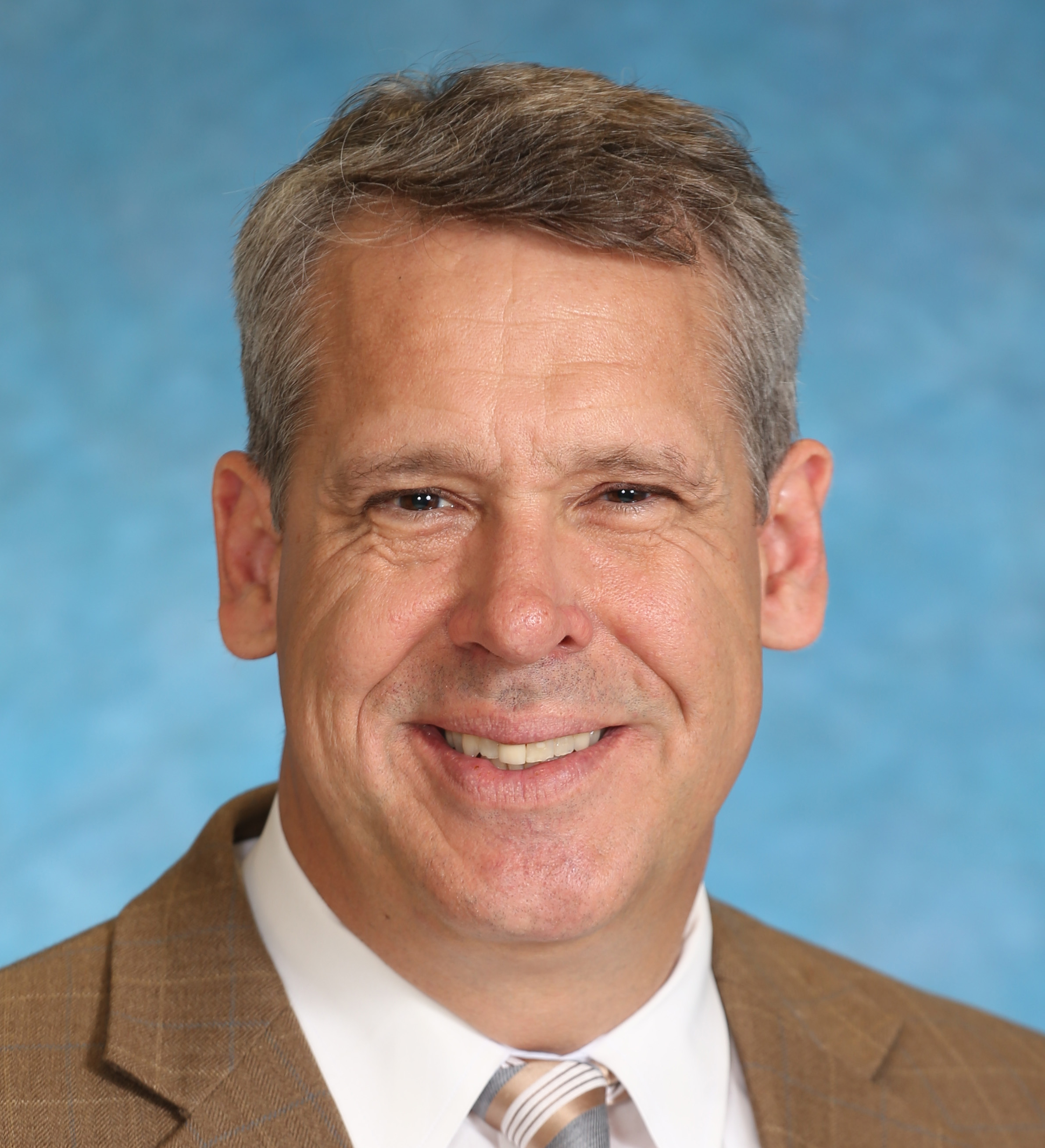
- Barnes in 2015

Current position
- Title: Athletic director
- Team: Oregon State
- Conference: Pac-12

Biographical details
- Born: June 23, 1962 (age 64); Spokane, Washington, U.S.
- Education: Fresno State

Administrative career (AD unless noted)
- 1997–1999: Humboldt State
- 1999–2005: Eastern Washington
- 2005–2008: Washington (sr. assoc. AD)
- 2008–2015: Utah State
- 2015–2017: Pittsburgh
- 2017–2026: Oregon State

Scott Barnes (born June 23, 1962) is a former collegiate sports executive. Until 2026 he was the vice president and athletic director at Oregon State University. He was previously the athletic director at Utah State University and the University of Pittsburgh.

== Career ==
During his tenure at Utah State University, Barnes greatly increased funding for all Aggie sports, and oversaw the hiring of football coach Gary Andersen and the completion of the Jim & Carol Laub Athletics-Academics Complex on campus. He also worked to improve the public image and visibility of Aggie sports, which included inking deals with statewide and national TV stations, as well as a sponsorship deal with the Maverik chain of service stations, resulting in the renaming of the university's football stadium in April 2015.

On May 8, 2013, Barnes was named chairman of the NCAA Men's Basketball Tournament's selection committee.

His work was recognized with the awarding of the 2009 National Champion in the Excellence in Management Cup to USU, an award which is given each year to the university athletics department that wins the most championships with the lowest expenses. The Aggies brought in WAC championships in five sports during the 2008–09 academic year, tied for the most in school history. Barnes was also recently selected as a faculty member in the Division I Athletics Director Association Institute.

As the athletics director, Barnes's work was integral in improving the overall image of Utah State University itself, which image had taken a hit in recent years due to the futility of the football team. The New York Times quoted him as saying "Athletics are the front porch of the university. It's not the most important room in the house, but it is the most visible."

On December 22, 2016, Barnes was reunited with Gary Andersen and named the Athletic Director and Vice President at Oregon State University.

Before going to OSU, Barnes served as athletics director at Utah State University and Eastern Washington University. He has also held positions at the University of Washington and the University of San Diego. He attended Fresno State University, where he played basketball.
