= 2026 Grand Canyon Antelopes women's volleyball team =

American college women's volleyball season

2026 Grand Canyon Antelopes women's volleyball
- Conference: Mountain West Conference
- Record: 11–10 (5-5 Mountain West)
- Head coach: Kendra Potts (3rd season)
- Associate head coach: Casey Shingler (3rd season)
- Assistant coaches: Evan Larson (5th season); Ryan Vorderer (3rd season)
- Home stadium: Global Credit Union Arena

The 2026 Grand Canyon Antelopes women's volleyball team represents Grand Canyon University in the 2026 NCAA Division I women's volleyball season. The Antelopes, led by head coach Kendra Potts, play their home matches in the Global Credit Union Arena located on campus in Phoenix, Arizona. Grand Canyon has been a member of the Mountain West Conference since the 2025-26 season.

2026 Mountain West Conference women's volleyball standings
	Conf.				Overall
Team	W		L	PCT	W		L	PCT
Hawaii ‍‍‍	2	–	0	1.000	10	–	3	.769
UTEP ‍‍‍	2	–	0	1.000	10	–	4	.714
Air Force ‍‍‍	2	–	0	1.000	6	–	7	.462
UC Davis ‍‍‍	2	–	0	1.000	6	–	7	.462
Grand Canyon ‍‍‍	1	–	1	.500	7	–	6	.538
Nevada ‍‍‍	1	–	1	.500	3	–	9	.250
Wyoming ‍‍‍	0	–	2	.000	7	–	6	.538
San Jose State ‍‍‍	0	–	2	.000	5	–	8	.385
UNLV ‍‍‍	0	–	2	.000	4	–	9	.308
New Mexico ‍‍‍	0	–	2	.000	2	–	10	.167
As of September 27, 2026; Rankings from Mountain West

== Previous season ==
Grand Canyon finished the 2025 season with a 17–13 overall record and a 9–9 record in Mountain West Conference play, finishing fifth in the conference standings. The Antelopes advanced to the Mountain West Championship, where they lost to fourth-seeded Boise State in the quarterfinals.

== Preseason ==
The Mountain West released its preseason poll and preseason team on August 19, 2026. Grand Canyon was picked to finish third with 70 points and two first-place votes, while Bella Nunez was named to the preseason team.

=== Mountain West Preseason Poll ===
Preseason Poll
Pos.	Team	Points
1	UTEP	84 (4)
2	UC Davis	80 (4)
3	Grand Canyon	70 (2)
4	Wyoming	69
5	Hawai'i	67
6	UNLV	53
7	San Jose	40
8	Air Force	36
9	Nevada	26
10	New Mexico	25

Preseason Mountain West Team
Player	No.	Position	Class
Bella Nunez	21	Setter	Sophomore

== Roster ==
2026 Grand Canyon Antelopes Roster
No.	Name	Position	Height	Year	Hometown
1	Nika Zupanic	L/DS	5'4"	Fr.	Osijek, Croatia
2	Katie Schulz	OH	6'1"	Sr.	Appleton, Wisc.
3	Alayna Austin	L/DS	5'8"	Fr.	Mesa, Ariz.
4	Taylor Kubacak	S	5'11"	Jr.	Kerrville, Texas
5	Ali Wiest	OH	6'0"	Sr.	Peoria, Ariz.
7	Natalie Guerrero	DS	5'5"	Jr.	Tolleson, Ariz.
8	Bella Anderson	L	5'9"	Sr.	Scottsdale, Ariz.
9	Macey Hughes	OPP	6'1"	So.	San Antonio, Texas
10	Aubrey Bellus	MB	6'2"	So.	Mesa, Ariz.
11	Gentry Oblad	OH	6'0"	Fr.	Henderson, Nev.
12	Starr Williams	OH/OPP	6'3"	5th	Ontario, Calif.
15	Kaela Jenkins	MB	6'2"	Fr.	Tiffin, Ohio
16	Hunter West	LIB	5'8"	Jr.	Wausa, Neb.
17	Audrey Cook	S/DS	5'9"	Fr.	Houston, Texas
18	Milica Zigic	OH	6'2"	Fr.	Belgrade, Serbia
19	Aubrey Goodere	MB	6'3"	Jr.	Buckeye, Ariz.
20	Ana Jaramazovic	OPP	6'4"	So.	Subotica, Serbia
21	Bella Nunez	S	5'11"	So.	El Paso, Texas
22	Logan Strong	L/DS	5'10"	So.	Ontario, Canada
23	Mia Vukic	MB	6'1"	Fr.	Belgrade, Serbia

=== Coaches ===
2026 Grand Canyon Antelopes Coaching Staff
Position	Name	Season
Head Coach	Kendra Potts	3rd
Associate Head Coach	Casey Shingler	3rd
Assistant coach	Evan Larson	5th
Assistant coach	Ryan Vorderer	3rd

== Schedule ==
2026 Grand Canyon Antelopes Schedule 11-10 (5-5 MW)
Date Time	TV Radio	Opponents	Rank	Stadiums	Scores	Sets	Attendance	Overall	Mountain West
Aug. 12 12:00 p.m.	—	Utah State Exhibition	—	Antelope Gymnasium Phoenix, AZ	—	—	—	—	—
Aug. 14 4:00 p.m.	—	Purple-White Scrimmage	—	Antelope Gymnasium Phoenix, AZ	—	—	—	—	—
Texas A&M Invitational
Aug. 28 9:00 a.m.	SEC Network	@ #8 Texas A&M	—	Reed Arena College Station, TX	L, 1-3	15-25 17-25 25-15 13-25	2975	0-1	—
Aug. 28 3:30 p.m.	—	vs Cal Poly	—	Reed Arena College Station, TX	L, 0-3	22-25 21-25 22-25	75	0-2	—
Aug. 29 2:00 p.m.	—	vs Arkansas State	—	Reed Arena College Station, TX	W, 3-0	25-19 25-15 25-23	75	1-2	—
GCU Invitational
Sep. 4 7:00 p.m.	MW+	Louisiana Monroe	—	Global Credit Union Arena Phoenix, AZ	W, 3-0	25-16 25-20 25-21	7207	2-2	—
Sep. 5 6:00 p.m.	MW+	San Francisco	—	Global Credit Union Arena Phoenix, AZ	L, 0-3	20-25 22-25 18-25	1008	2-3	—
Sep. 6 2:00 p.m.	MW+	Temple	—	Global Credit Union Arena Phoenix, AZ	W, 3-1	25-23 25-13 20-25 25-15	1201	3-3	—
Lumberjack Classic
Sep. 10 3:00 p.m.	—	vs UC Riverside	—	Rolle Activity Center Flagstaff, AZ	W, 3-1	25-13 25-17 19-25 25-13	75	4-3	—
Sep. 11 6:00 p.m.	ESPN+	@ Northern Arizona	—	Rolle Activity Center Flagstaff, AZ	W, 3-2	20-25 25-20 25-14 20-25 15-11	572	5-3	—
Sep. 12 11:00 a.m.	—	vs Omaha	—	Rolle Activity Center Flagstaff, AZ	L, 2-3	26-28 25-15 22-25 25-13 12-15	89	5-4	—
Jayhawk Classic
Sep. 19 12:00 p.m.	ESPN+	vs Ole Miss	—	Horejsi Family Volleyball Arena Lawrence, KS	W, 3-1	16-25 25-20 25-14 25-22	—	6-4	—
Sep. 20 12:00 p.m.	ESPN+	@ Kansas	—	Horejsi Family Volleyball Arena Lawrence, KS	L, 0-3	21-25 21-25 15-25	1810	6-5	—
Mountain West Conference Matches
Sep. 24 6:00 p.m.	MW+	@ Nevada	—	Virginia Street Gym Reno, NV	L, 2-3	27-25 25-27 21-25 25-22 14-16	514	6-6	0-1
Sep. 25 6:00 p.m.	MW+	@ Nevada	—	Virginia Street Gym Reno, NV	W, 3-2	19-25 23-25 25-20 25-17 15-10	702	7-6	1-1
Oct. 2 6:00 p.m.	MW+	Hawai'i	—	Global Credit Union Arena Phoenix, AZ	L, 0-3	23-25 23-25 20-25	1425	7-7	1-2
Oct. 3 6:00 p.m.	MW+	Hawai'i	—	Global Credit Union Arena Phoenix, AZ	L, 0-3	23-25 21-25 10-25	2561	7-8	1-3
Oct. 8 6:00 p.m.	MW+	@ UNLV	—	Cox Pavilion Las Vegas, NV	L, 0-3	20-25 18-25 23-25	140	7-9	1-4
Oct. 10 4:00 p.m.	MW+	UNLV	—	Global Credit Union Arena Phoenix, AZ	W, 3-2	21-25 25-22 25-15 23-25 15-8	3005	8-9	2-4
Oct. 15 5:00 p.m.	MW+	@ Air Force	—	Cadet East Gym USAF Academy, CO	W, 3-1	25-22 16-25 25-22 27-25	568	9-9	3-4
Oct. 16 5:00 p.m.	MW+	@ Air Force	—	Cadet East Gym USAF Academy, CO	L, 2-3	22-25 24-26 26-24 26-24 8-15	631	9-10	3-5
Oct. 22 6:00 p.m.	MW+	Wyoming	—	Global Credit Union Arena Phoenix, AZ	W, 3-0	27-25 25-21 25-14	752	10-10	4-5
Oct. 24 1:00 p.m.	MW+	Wyoming	—	Global Credit Union Arena Phoenix, AZ	W, 3-2	25-20 17-25 24-26 30-28 15-9	895	11-10	5-5
Oct. 29 5:30 p.m.	MW+	@ New Mexico	—	The Pit Albuquerque, NM	—	—	—	—	—
Oct. 31 12:00 p.m.	MW+	@ New Mexico	—	The Pit Albuquerque, NM	—	—	—	—	—
Nov. 5 6:00 p.m.	MW+	San Jose State	—	Global Credit Union Arena Phoenix, AZ	—	—	—	—	—
Nov. 7 11:30 a.m.	MW+	San Jose State	—	Global Credit Union Arena Phoenix, AZ	—	—	—	—	—
Nov. 12 6:00 p.m.	MW+	UTEP	—	Global Credit Union Arena Phoenix, AZ	—	—	—	—	—
Nov. 14 1:00 p.m.	MW+	UTEP	—	Global Credit Union Arena Phoenix, AZ	—	—	—	—	—
Nov. 18 7:00 p.m.	MW+	@ UC Davis	—	University Credit Union Center Davis, CA	—	—	—	—	—
Nov. 19 7:00 p.m.	MW+	@ UC Davis	—	University Credit Union Center Davis, CA	—	—	—	—	—
Mountain West Championship

All times listed are Phoenix time — same as Pacific Time through Oct. 31 and same as Mountain Time beginning Nov. 1.
