= Jadyn Edwards =

American soccer player (born 2000)

Personal information
- Full name: Jadyn Grace Edwards
- Date of birth: June 8, 2000 (age 26)
- Height: 5 ft 4 in (1.63 m)
- Position: Forward

Team information
- Current team: Ferencváros
- Number: 27

Youth career
- Greater Seattle Surf

College career
Years	Team	Apps	(Gls)
2018–2022	New Mexico Lobos	94	(31)

Senior career*
Years	Team	Apps	(Gls)
2023	OL Reign	0	(0)
2024–	Ferencváros	61	(29)
- * Club domestic league appearances and goals as of 02:22, June 17, 2026 (UTC)

Jadyn Grace Edwards (born June 8, 2000) is an American professional soccer player who plays as a forward for Hungarian Női NB I club Ferencváros. She played college soccer for the New Mexico Lobos, where she set program records in appearances and assists, before being selected in the 2023 NWSL Draft by Racing Louisville FC.

== Early life ==
Edwards is from Mill Creek, Washington. She started playing soccer at age 5 for her local YMCA recreational league before spending five years with club team Greater Seattle Surf, where she reached one state cup final. She attended Henry M. Jackson High School, where she was a three-time all-league first-team honoree, contributed to four district championships, and led the soccer team to one second-place state finish. In her senior year, she switched positions from midfielder to forward and subsequently recorded 18 goals and 17 assists on the season.

== College career ==
Partially due to the presence of head coach Heather Dyche, Edwards chose to play collegiately for the New Mexico Lobos. She scored back-to-back overtime game-winners in 2020 and 2021 to clinch two consecutive Mountain West regular season titles; in 2021, she was also named the Mountain West Offensive Player of the Year. Edwards was able to return to New Mexico for a fifth year in 2022 due to the extra year of NCAA eligibility offered to athletes resulting from the COVID-19 pandemic. In August 2022, she was named to the Mac Hermann Trophy watchlist, becoming the first Lobo athlete to do so.

Edwards finished her college career with 94 appearances and 24 assists, setting program records in both categories. Her 31 assists ranked third in New Mexico's all-time leaderboard. Across her five years, she had helped the Lobos secure four Mountain West regular season championships and one tournament title. Edwards herself was a two-time Mountain West all-tournament honoree, three-time all-first team Mountain West honoree, and three-time all-region honoree. She also registered three hat tricks and four multi-goal games.

== Club career ==
=== OL Reign ===
Edwards was selected by Racing Louisville FC in the third round of the 2023 NWSL Draft as the 29th overall pick. She became the first-ever Lobo to be drafted into the NWSL. Edwards spent one month training with Louisville's preseason squad before the club waived her rights. In March 2023, she returned to her home state of Washington, joining OL Reign as a non-rostered trialist. The Reign signed Edwards to her first professional contract on June 26, 2023, a national team replacement deal to fill in roster space vacated by players at the 2023 FIFA Women's World Cup. The contract signified a full-circle moment for Edwards, whose first time watching an NWSL match in-person had been at a Seattle Reign FC game when she was in high school. Three days later, she made her professional debut in the NWSL Challenge Cup, playing second-half minutes and recording one shot on target in a victory over rivals Portland Thorns FC. She did not make any further appearances for the Reign before her short-term contract expired.

=== Ferencváros ===
On January 16, 2024, Edwards was announced to have signed a contract with Hungarian club Ferencváros. In her first five months with the team, she helped Ferencváros win its fifth league championship in a row after beating Győri ETO FC in May 2024 to clinch the title. During the match, Edwards tallied a hat-trick to seal the deal.

In the 2024–25 season, Edwards gained experience in the UEFA Women's Champions League. On 4 September 2024, she scored both of Ferencváros's goals in a 2–1 qualifier victory over Estonian champions Flora Tallinn. However, in the following match, Ferencváros was beaten by Vorskla Poltava, dashing the club's hopes of playing in the main Champions League tournament. She finished the campaign with 12 goals in 13 league games en route to yet another league title.

On December 4, 2025, Ferencváros announced the extension of Edwards' contract. The start of Edwards' third season in Hungary was fraught with injury, but she managed to finish the season with 22 appearances nevertheless. In the first match of the Női NB I final, Edwards scored as Ferencváros beat Puskás Akadémia, 6–2.

== Honors and awards ==
New Mexico Lobos

- Mountain West Conference: 2018, 2020, 2021, 2022
- Mountain West women's soccer tournament: 2021

Ferencváros

- Női NB I: 2023–24, 2024–25

Individual

- First-team All-Mountain West: 2020, 2021, 2022
- Second-team All-Mountain West: 2019
- Mountain West tournament all-tournament team: 2021, 2022
- Mountain West Conference Offensive Player of the Year: 2021
