= Denise Castro =

Mexican soccer player (born 2003)

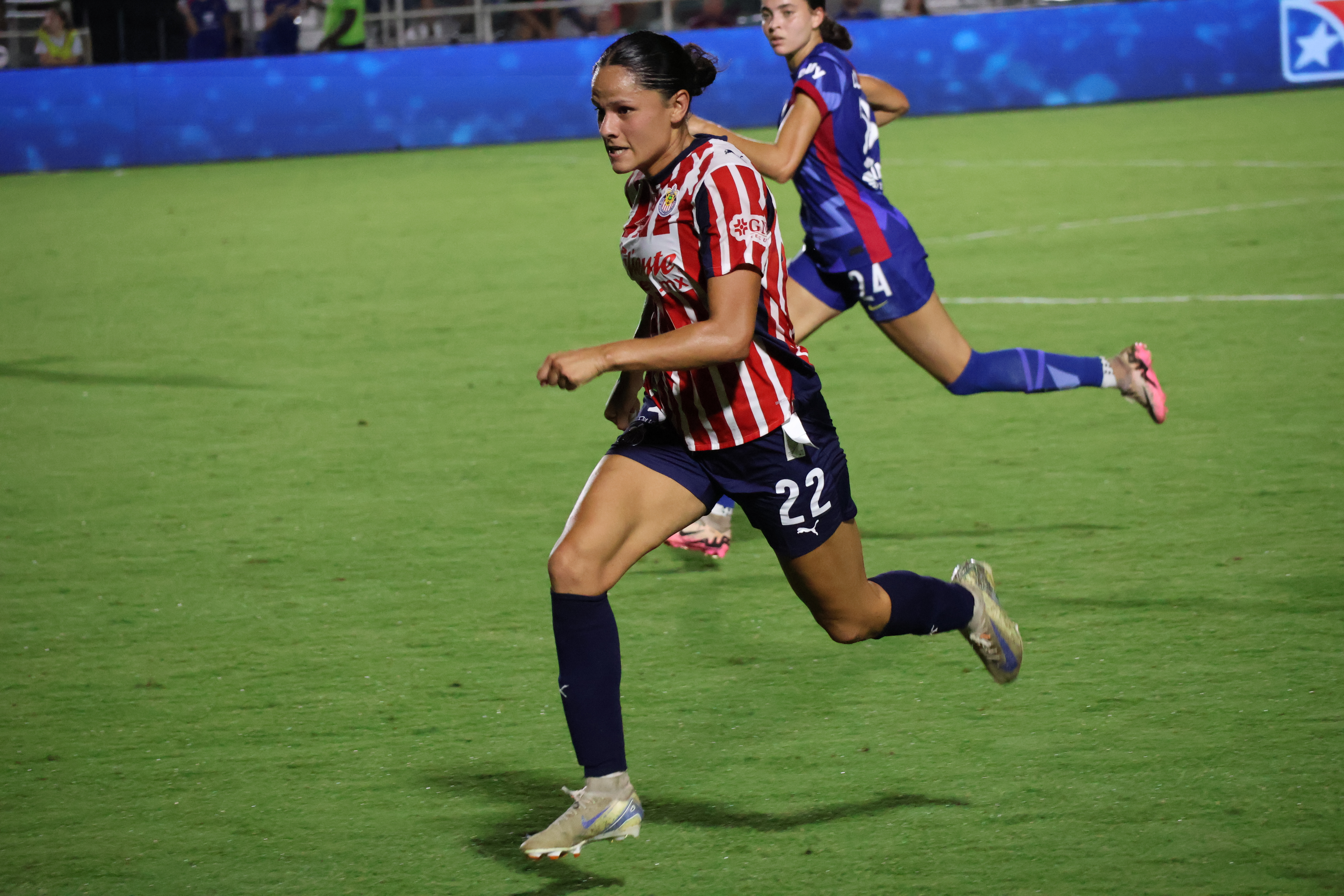

Personal information
- Full name: Denise Castro Ruvalcaba
- Date of birth: April 20, 2003 (age 23)
- Place of birth: California, United States
- Height: 1.71 m (5 ft 7 in)
- Position: Attacking midfielder

Team information
- Current team: Guadalajara
- Number: 22

Youth career
- Albion SC San Diego

College career
Years	Team	Apps	(Gls)
2022–2024	San Diego State Aztecs	79	(35)

Senior career*
Years	Team	Apps	(Gls)
2025–	Guadalajara	21	(7)

International career
2017–2018	Mexico U17		
- * Club domestic league appearances and goals as of February 1, 2026

Denise Castro Ruvalcaba (born April 20, 2003) is a professional soccer player who plays as a midfielder for Liga MX Femenil club Guadalajara. Born in the United States, she has been called up to the Mexican team.

== Early life ==
Castro graduated from San Ysidro High School in San Ysidro, San Diego and played youth soccer for Albion SC San Diego from the 15U to 18U levels. She later played college soccer for the San Diego State Aztecs, where she was named the Mountain West Conference Offensive Player of the Year in 2023.

== Club career ==
In 2025, she started her career in Guadalajara.

== International career ==
Gómez was member of the squad that played the Mexico women's national under-17 football team at the 2018 FIFA U-17 Women's World Cup.
