= Kelsey Kaufusi =

American soccer player (born 2001)

Personal information
- Birth name: Kelsey Steed
- Date of birth: January 22, 2001 (age 25)
- Height: 5 ft 9 in (1.75 m)
- Position: Defender

Youth career
- Crush L30

College career
Years	Team	Apps	(Gls)
2021–2023	Utah State Aggies	76	(0)

Senior career*
Years	Team	Apps	(Gls)
2022	Minnesota Aurora	12	(0)
- * Club domestic league appearances and goals as of 04:01, May 21, 2026 (UTC)

Kelsey Kaufusi (née Steed; born January 22, 2001) is an American former soccer player who played as a defender. She played college soccer for the Utah State Aggies, earning Mountain West Defensive Player of the Year honors in 2023. She was selected in the second round of the 2024 NWSL Draft by Portland Thorns FC .

== Early life ==
Kaufusi was raised in Syracuse, Utah. She played club soccer for Crush L30, winning a Presidents Cup in her latter years. She attended Syracuse High School, participating in soccer, basketball, and track and field. As a member of the track team, Kaufusi reached regional championships across multiple events, in addition to two state third-place finishes in the long jump and one in the 4×100 relay. In soccer, Kaufusi was a varsity letterwinner in all four years. She led the team to respective state runner-up, semifinal, and quarterfinal appearances. She was named first-team all-Utah as a junior.

== College career ==
Kaufusi started all 76 games for the Utah State Aggies across four seasons. In her freshman season in the spring of 2021, she was named second-team all-Mountain West after leading the Aggies with 922 minutes played across the campaign. The following season, Kaufusi once again played every minute of the campaign. She earned Mountain West all-tournament honors as Utah State were eliminated in the semifinals by eventual champions New Mexico. As a junior in 2022, she received her second all-Mountain West second team award.

In her senior year, Kaufusi had her most successful season. She was named Mountain West Defensive Player of the Year and first-team all-Mountain West after helping pilot Utah State to a second-place regular-season finish, in addition to its first-ever Mountain West tournament title. Her efforts, alongside the other players in the Aggies' experienced backline, resulted in Utah State conceding the least goals in the conference. In 2024, Kaufusi was nominated for the NCAA Woman of the Year Award.

== Club career ==
In the offseason before her senior year of college, Kaufusi played for Minnesota Aurora FC in the inaugural season of the pre-professional USL W League. She recorded 2 assists in 15 total appearances. She helped the Aurora reach the championship match and was named second-team all-league at the end of the season.

Kaufusi chose not to return to Utah State for a fifth year, despite the NCAA offering players an extra year of eligibility following the COVID-19 pandemic. Prior to the 2024 NWSL Draft, she attended a pre-draft camp with the San Diego Wave. Once the draft rolled around in January, Kaufusi was selected in the second round by Portland Thorns FC, becoming the 25th overall selection in the NWSL's final college draft. She became the first-ever player from Utah State to be drafted into the NWSL. Kaufusi attended the Thorns' initial training camp, and was named to the squad that attended the Coachella Valley Invitational preseason tournament. However, she did not make the team's final roster.

== Personal life ==
Kaufusi is the oldest of four siblings born to Thomas and Allison Steed. Her mother played soccer collegiately at Weber State.

In 2021, Kaufusi married Nathan Kaufusi, a former Utah State track and field. They had attended high school and college together. The couple welcomed their first child on April 27, 2026.

== Honors and awards ==
Utah State Aggies

- Mountain West tournament: 2023

Individual

- First-team All-Mountain West: 2023
- Second-team All-Mountain West: 2020, 2022
- Mountain West Defensive Player of the Year: 2023
