= Utah State Aggies Handball =

University Club Sports Team

The Utah State Aggies are an American handball team, representing Utah State University, in collegiate tournaments organized by the United States Handball Association.

== History ==
Handball started as a class at Utah State in 2001 by Herm Olsen as a result of, what he felt was, declining participation in the game in younger generations. He coached the team for more than 20 years, instilling a "tradition of winning" in the program, and oversaw the development of 11 individual national champions, two doubles championship teams, and led the Aggies to Men's and Women's national team championships in 2022. Olsen was named the US Handball Association Coach of the year in 2021 and was inducted into the Utah Handball Hall of Fame on September 27, 2025.

In what proved to be his final year, Utah State was co-coached by Olsen and Stacey Marble during the 2022-2023 season. The Aggies won a Combined national team championship and another Men's national team championship. Following Olsen's retirement, Marble assumed full control of the team ahead of the 2023-2024 season.

== Championships ==
=== Team Championships ===
Year	Combined	Men's	Women's	Site
2022		A-Division	A-Division	Missouri State University
2023	A-Division	B-Division		Tucson Racquet Club
Total	1	2	1	

=== Individual Champions ===
Year	Division	Player	Site
2009	Women's C-Division	Krista Allen	University of Minnesota
2011	Women's Division 2	Shyla Sadderwhite	Missouri State University
2012	Men's Division 2-Challenger	Rob Castelton	Missouri State University
2013	Men's Division 1B	Ryan Campbell	Arizona State University
2014	Men's Division 2A	Jonathan Larson	North Carolina State University
2014	Women's Division 2A	Kaneesha Goodworth	North Carolina State University
2015	Men's Division 2-Intermediate	Andy Graves	Pacific University, OR
2016	Women's B1-Division	Jeanne Hancock	University of Minnesota
2017	Men's Division 3C	Jarod Jensen	Arizona State University
2017	Women's A1-Division	Lindsey Boetler	Arizona State University
2018	Men's B3-Division	Jarod Jensen	Missouri State University
2024	Women's B1-Division	Rachael Fisher	University of Minnesota
Total	12		

=== Doubles Championships ===
Year	Division	Player	Player	Site
2013	Men's Division B	Ryan Campbell	Jonathan Larson	Arizona State University
2018	Men's Division B	Jarod Jensen	Logan Jensen	Missouri State University
2024	Women's Division C	Jillian Young	Cambria Cannon	University of Minnesota
Total	3			

== Head coaches ==
Years	Coach	Team Championships	Individual Champions	Doubles Championships
2001–2022	Herm Olsen	2	11	2
2022–2023	Olsen/Marble	2	0	0
2023–Present	Stacey Marble	0	1	1
