= Suzanne Stonebarger =

American beach volleyball player

Suzanne Stonebarger is a professional American beach volleyball player. Stonebarger is an alumna of the University of Nevada-Reno, where she played college volleyball. At Nevada-Reno Stonebarger met and played with her present-day teammate, Michelle More. After graduating from college, Stonebarger traded her uniform in for a bikini and a job in the Association of Volleyball Professionals playing professional beach volleyball. She and her partner are known as "Team Gorgeous". Stonebarger and More both make their homes in Redondo Beach, California. Stonebarger appeared as a "stranger" on the NBC game show Identity, in which her profession as a pro beach volleyball player was eventually identified. She is married to professional golfer, Ricky Barnes.
