= Michelle More =

American beach volleyball player (born 1981)

Michelle More (born June 12, 1981) is a professional American beach volleyball player. Michelle grew up in Southern California and attended the University of Nevada-Reno. At Nevada-Reno, More met fellow volleyball player Suzanne Stonebarger, who is her beach volleyball teammate. After a college volleyball career at Nevada-Reno in which she set several school records, More entered the Association of Volleyball Professionals. A native of Torrance, California, More resides in nearby Redondo Beach.

== Team Gorgeous ==
Prior to joining the AVP, More and her teammate Suzanne Stonebarger were given the nickname "Team Gorgeous". In 2009, the pair appeared in a Playboy magazine spread.
