= Spartan Soccer Complex =

Soccer stadium in San Jose, California

- Interactive map of Spartan Soccer Complex
- Location: San Jose, California
- Coordinates: 37°19′12.93″N 121°51′59.96″W
- Owner: San Jose State University
- Capacity: ~1,560
- Surface: Natural grass
- Scoreboard: Yes
- Record attendance: 1,559 (Sept. 1, 2023 vs Stanford)

Construction
- Opened: 2017; 9 years ago

Tenants
- San Jose State Spartans (NCAA) teams: men's and women's soccer 2017–present; Bay FC (NWSL, training facility) 2024–present

Website
- sjsuspartans.com

Spartan Soccer Complex is a roughly 1,560-seat soccer-specific stadium on the campus of San Jose State University in San Jose, California. It is the home to the San Jose State Spartans men's and women's college soccer teams.

== History ==
After plans fell through in 2007 for a new San Jose State Stadium which would have housed the school's football and soccer teams as well as the San Jose Earthquakes, the site sat unused before eventually serving as practice fields and stadium parking. Both teams played at CEFCU Stadium until the site was developed into the Spartan Soccer Complex and completed ahead of the 2017 NCAA soccer season.

To celebrate the opening of the complex, the Spartans hosted the #1 Stanford Cardinal, losing 0–4. The Spartans' first goal and first win in the complex came a week later with a 3–2 win over the UC Davis Aggies. In 2018, the complex hosted the Mountain West Conference women's soccer tournament, which the Spartans won.

Since 2024, the Bay FC have used the complex as a training site. In 2026, the complex was chosen as the base camp of the Paraguay National Team for the 2026 FIFA men's World Cup.
