= SDSU Sports Deck =

Multi-purpose arena in San Diego, California, United States

- Interactive map of SDSU Sports Deck
- Address: 5490 Montezuma Rd
- Location: San Diego, California
- Coordinates: 32°46′16″N 117°04′36″W
- Owner: San Diego State University
- Operator: San Diego State Athletics
- Capacity: 3,000
- Type: Stadium
- Surface: Natural grass
- Current use: Soccer; Track and field
- Public transit: San Diego MTS bus system San Diego Trolley; Green Line at SDSU Transit Center

Construction
- Opened: 2000
- Cost: $13 million

Tenants
- San Diego State Aztecs (NCAA) teams: men's and women's soccer; women's track and field; San Diego Legion (MLR) (2022)

Website
- goaztecs.com/sdsu-sports-deck

The SDSU Sports Deck is a stadium in San Diego, California, located on the campus of San Diego State University (SDSU). Opened in 2000, it is the home of the men's and women's soccer, and women's track and field teams. The Aztecs compete in NCAA Division I as a member of the Pac-12 Conference for women's soccer and women's track & field, and for men's soccer.

The facility is built atop the university's two-story parking structure (P7). It was the temporary home of the San Diego Legion of Major League Rugby (MLR) in 2022; the Legion moved to Snapdragon Stadium in 2023. It hosted the 2023 U.S. Open Cup second round matchup between San Diego Loyal SC and Albion San Diego.
