= Nevada Wolf Pack =

American athletic program of the University of Nevada, Reno

- University: University of Nevada, Reno
- Nickname: Sagebrushers (1896–1922); Wolf Pack (1923–present)
- NCAA: Division I (FBS)
- Conference: Mountain West Conference
- Athletic director: Stephanie Rempe
- Location: Reno, Nevada, U.S.
- Varsity teams: 15
- Football stadium: Mackay Stadium
- Basketball arena: Lawlor Events Center
- Baseball stadium: William Peccole Park
- Soccer stadium: Mackay Stadium
- Colors: Navy blue and silver
- Mascot: Alphie, Wolfie Jr. and Luna
- Fight song: "Nevada Fight Song"
- Website: nevadawolfpack.com
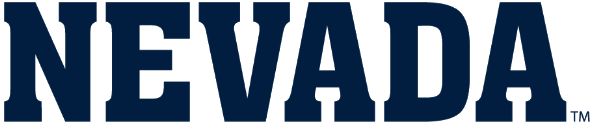

The Nevada Wolf Pack are the athletic teams that represent the University of Nevada, Reno. They are part of NCAA's Division I's Mountain West Conference. It was founded on October 24, 1896 with football as the Sagebrushers in Reno, Nevada.

== History ==
=== Name ===
Nevada's athletic teams were originally known as the Sagebrushers, named after Nevada's state flower. In the 1921–1922 school year, a local writer described the school's athletic teams as a "pack of wolves" which turned into "Desert Wolves." That name stuck until 1923, the student body designated "Wolves" as the school's mascot.

The Wolf Pack is always written as two words in the context of Nevada's sports teams. All media outlets refer to the athletic name as Nevada (except for Clark County and Las Vegas as UNR due to their bitter interstate rivalry) for history purposes.

=== Conference affiliation history ===
From 1925 to 1939 and again from 1954 to 1968, Nevada was a member of a now defunct Northern California Athletic Conference. In 1969, Nevada joined the West Coast Conference, but remained independent in football.

Eventually, this arrangement proved unsatisfactory for Nevada, who by 1975 was the only public school left in the WCC. At the same time, Gonzaga, a charter but non-football member of the Big Sky Conference, was facing pressure from the conference to either leave or add football (which they had dropped in 1941), as they were the only non-football member of the conference (and only private school as well).

Nevada is a member of the Mountain West Conference

A deal was then worked out in which Gonzaga and Nevada would swap conference affiliations in 1979. Gonzaga joined the WCC where it remains to this day, while Nevada moved to the Big Sky. Both new affiliations were the best institutional fits at the time.

By the early 1990s, Nevada had become one of the better football teams in what is now the Football Championship Subdivision of NCAA Division I, advancing to the title game in 1990. Nevada decided to upgrade to FBS in 1992, which required them to leave the Big Sky, which did not accept non-football members at the time (this changed in 2014). Nevada found a home in the Big West Conference, where in-state rival UNLV had been playing since 1982 (they would leave in 1996).

By the late 1990s, the football side of Big West had been unstable due to membership changes, so in 2000, Nevada joined the Western Athletic Conference, where they would remain for 12 years. The WAC itself became unstable in the early 2010s, with the first move being made by Boise State, who moved to the Mountain West Conference in 2011. This influenced Nevada to move there as well, in 2012. As a result of that move, Nevada was once again with the conference rivals along with UNLV (who formed the MWC with 7 other former WAC schools in 1999).

== Sports sponsored ==
Men's sports	Women's sports
Baseball	Softball
Basketball	Basketball
Cross country	Cross country
Football	Soccer
Golf	Golf
Tennis	Tennis
	Swimming & diving
	Track and field^{†}
	Volleyball
† – Track and field includes both indoor and outdoor.

=== Baseball ===
The baseball team plays at William Peccole Park and has made four appearances in the NCAA regionals, in 1994, 1997, 1999 and 2000. They have compiled a record of 5–8 in NCAA games, losing to Stanford in the finals of the Palo Alto Regional in 1999. Nevada finished the 1994 season ranked 19th in the country.

=== Men's basketball ===
The Nevada Men's Basketball program first began in 1913. The program has won 19 conference championships and made ten appearances in the NCAA tournament. The team's current coach is Steve Alford.

The men's basketball program has experienced some success in recent years. In 2004, the Wolf Pack men's basketball team qualified for the NCAA tournament and advanced to the Sweet Sixteen for the first time in school history, where they fell to Georgia Tech. The team earned a repeat trip in 2005 and beat Texas in the first round before falling to eventual national runner-up Illinois. The team returned for 2006 as a #5 seed but was upset in the first round by former Big Sky Conference rival Montana. They began the 2006–07 season ranked #24. The Pack's major star during this recent period of success was Nick Fazekas. In 2007, Nevada was ranked #9 in men's basketball, which is the highest ranking that Nevada has ever held. Guards Ramon Sessions and Marcellus Kemp both flirted with leaving as juniors for the NBA draft, however Kemp decided to remain at Nevada while Sessions was drafted 56th overall in the 2007 NBA draft.

=== Football ===
Jeff Choate is currently the head coach. Chris Ault, who in 2012 was one of two active coaches who were enshrined in the College Football Hall of Fame as coaches (the other was John Gagliardi, who also retired after the 2012 season), spent a total of 28 seasons as head coach in three separate stints. Ault is credited with the creation of the Pistol Offense which he implemented at Nevada in 2004. Ault was also one of four Football Bowl Subdivision coaches active in 2012 with 200 career wins.

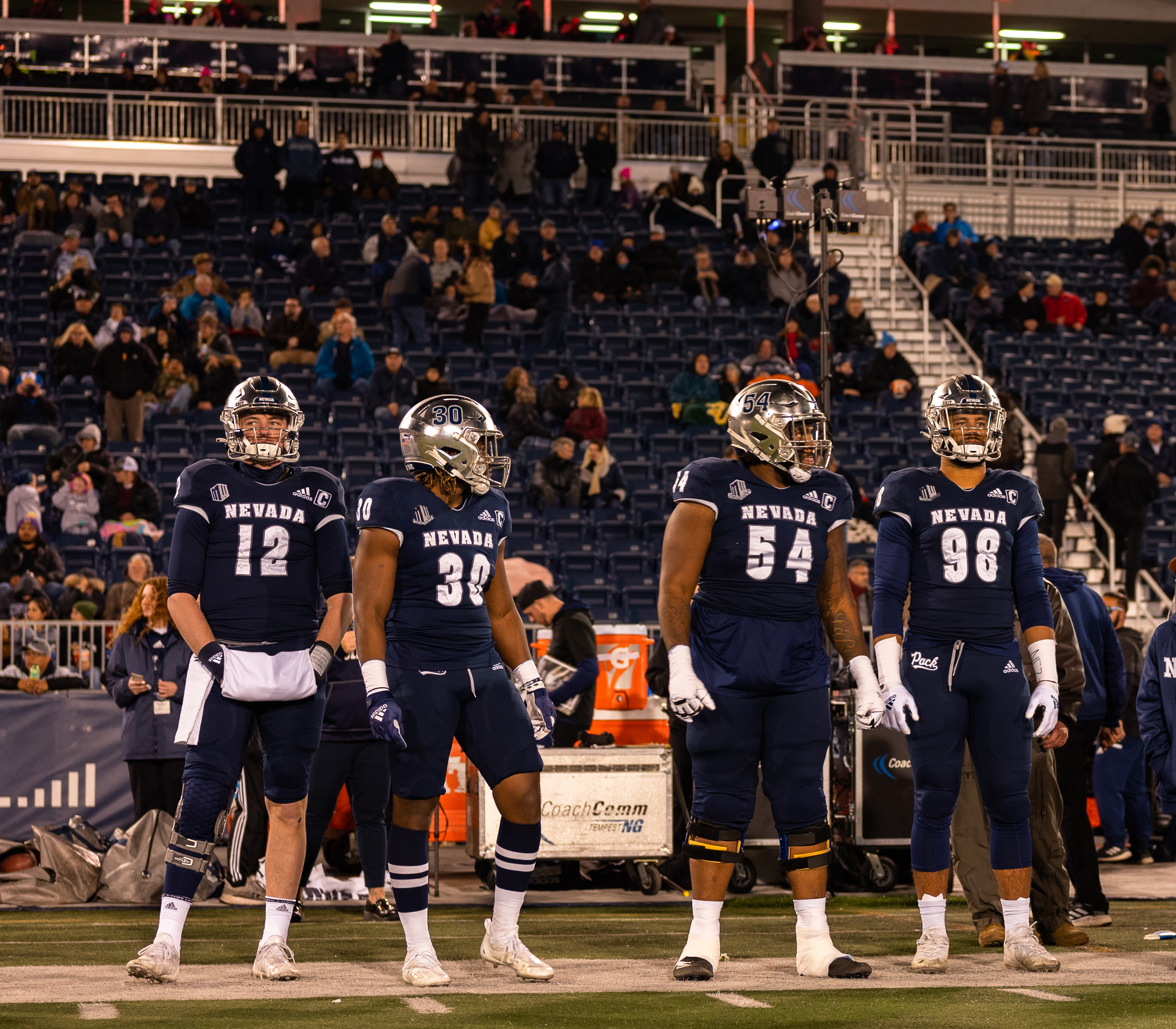
Nevada football players on the sideline before a game at Mackay Stadium in 2021

The football team plays home games at Mackay Stadium. The modern Mackay Stadium replaced its predecessor and was completed in 1966 with a seating capacity of 7,500. The facility has been expanded several times in its history and now seats 30,000.

The 2010 season saw Nevada at its best finishing the season ranked No. 11 in the AP and No. 13 in the BCS. The Pack celebrated their 500th win in school history with a 52–6 win over New Mexico State on November 20, 2010, at Mackay Stadium. On November 26, 2010, the Nevada Wolf Pack upset Boise State in a historic win at Mackay Stadium. In one round of overtime and 2 missed field goals by the Broncos, one at the end of regulation and one in overtime, Nevada Wolf Pack freshman kicker Anthony Martinez kicked a field goal to put Nevada on top for a final of 34–31. The Wolf Pack's win ended Boise State's 24-game winning streak, then the longest winning streak in the nation. It was also the Wolf Pack's first victory against Boise State after losing 10 straight games to the Broncos.

=== Men's cross country ===
On December 15, 2018, it was announced that the Men's cross country athletic team will be added.

=== Men's golf ===
See footnote

=== Men's tennis ===
See footnote

=== Women's basketball ===
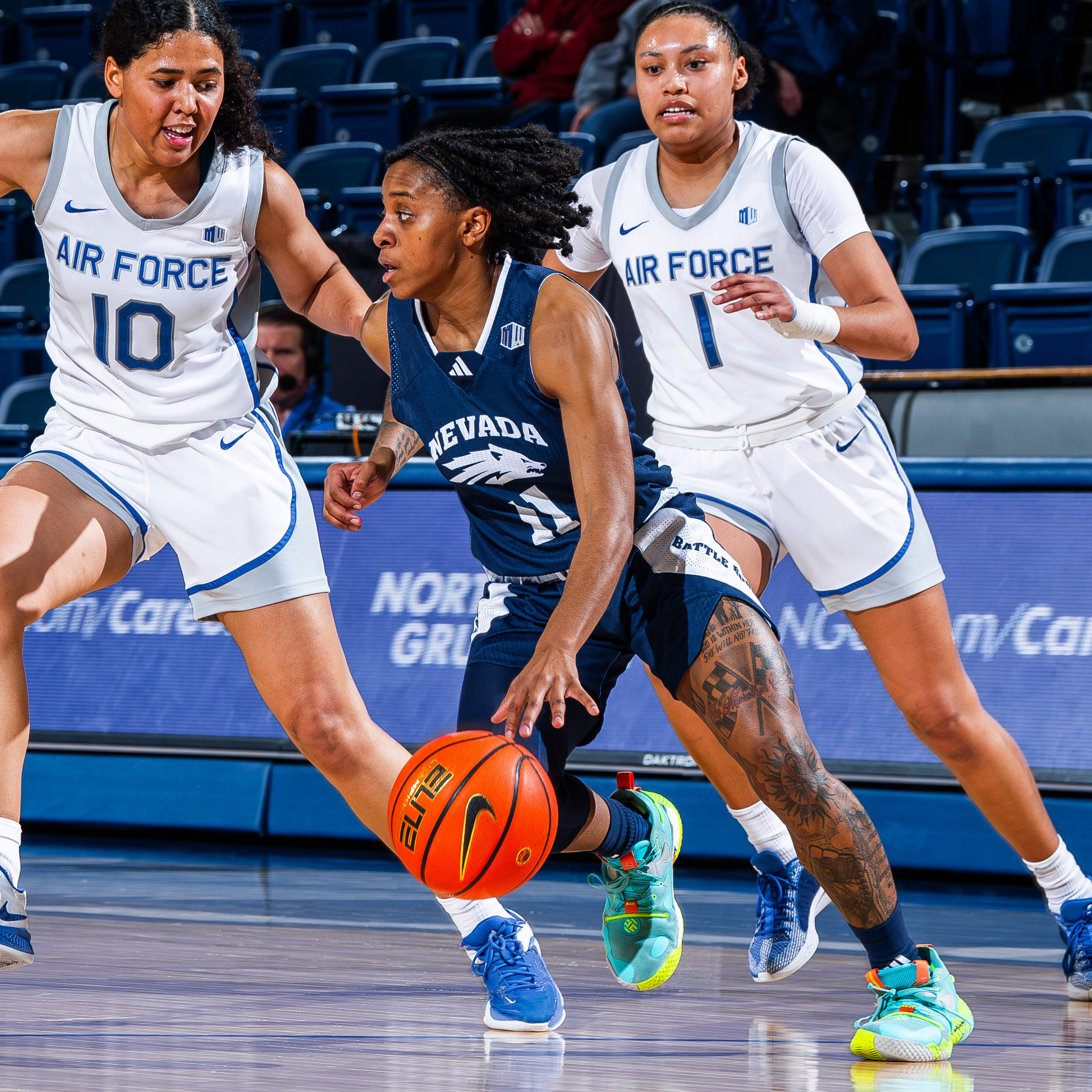
A Wolf Pack women's basketball game against Air Force in 2024

Nevada has played women's basketball since 1899, though records only go back to 1981. They have made Women's National Invitation Tournament appearances in 2007 and 2011. In 2018 they made it to the Semi Finals of the WBI.

=== Women's cross country ===
See footnote

=== Women's golf ===
See footnote

=== Women's soccer ===
Originally, the Nevada women's soccer team played home games for their inaugural 2000 season at Mendive Middle School in Sparks, Nevada. The following 2001 season, The Pack did not host any soccer home games. Mackay Stadium has played home to the women's soccer team since 2002 with occasional home matches being played offsite at the Moana Sports Complex (the previous site of Moana Stadium) in Reno, Nevada.

Nevada won its first WAC tournament title in 2006 and qualified for its first NCAA tournament since the program's inception in 2000. Nevada faced Fresno State in the championship match and after 110 minutes of scoreless play, the two teams went into a shootout where Nevada prevailed 4–2 in penalty kicks.

The 2023 Nevada soccer team tore apart previous home attendance records, averaging 829 fans per game. This was the first time in Nevada's history that two home soccer matches surpassed 1,000 in attendance in the same season. The 2023 Nevada soccer team qualified for the Mountain West Tournament for the first time in a decade.

=== Top 10 home match attendance records for Nevada soccer ===
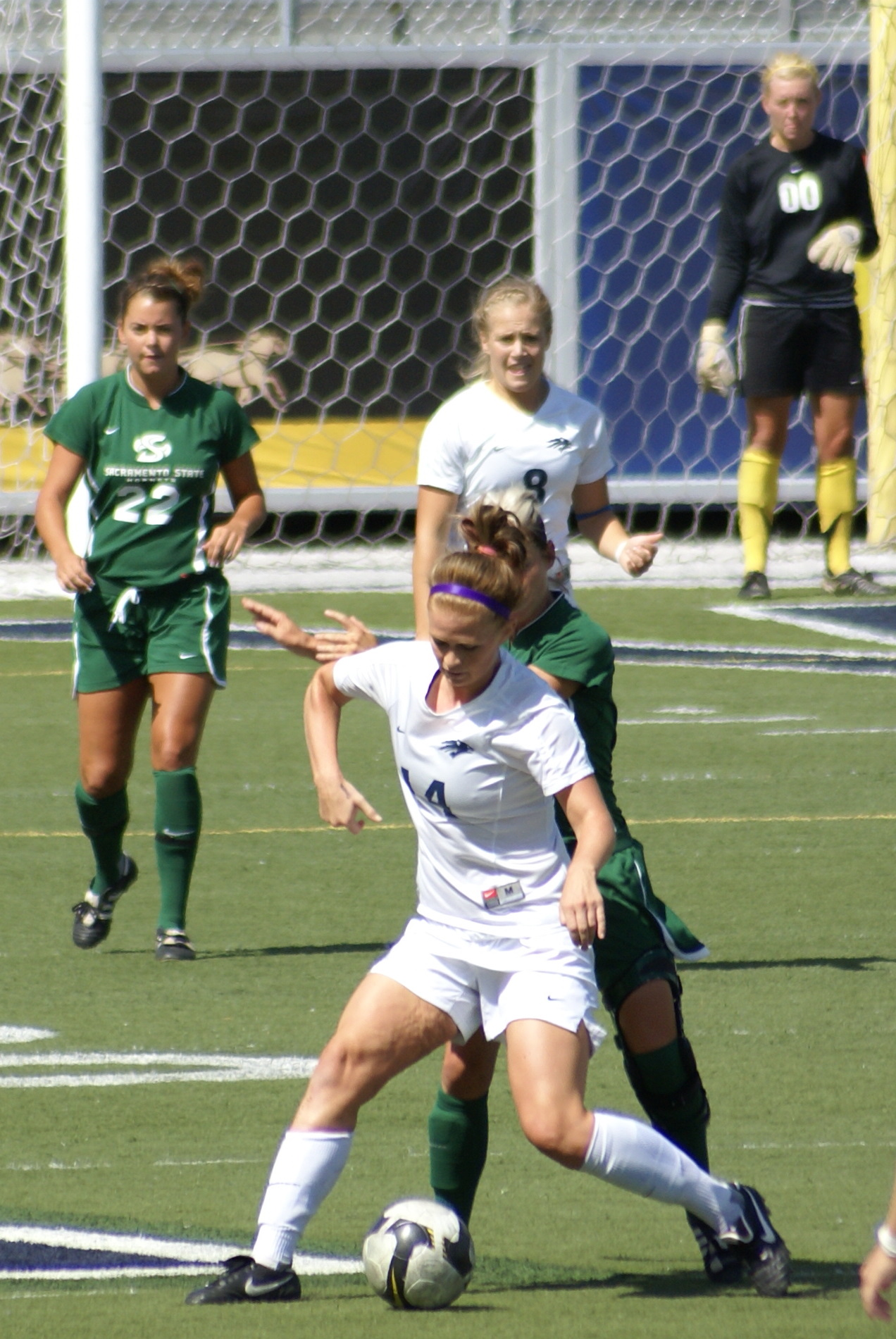
Nevada (in white) v Sacramento State match, 2009

Rank	Attendance	Opponent	Result	Date
1.	1,598	San Jose State	Won, 2-0	October 1, 2023
2.	1,304	UNLV	Loss, 0-1	October 26, 2023
3.	1,050 (Moana Sports Complex, Reno)	Sacramento State	Won, 3-2	September 15, 2013
4.	1,043	Wyoming	Won, 1-0	October 18, 2015
5.	1,007	^{#15} California	Loss, 0-3	September 23, 2012
6.	818	San Diego State	Won, 3-2	October 15, 2023
7.	795	Washington State	Won, 3-0	September 25, 2005
8.	712 (Moana Sports Complex, Reno)	Gonzaga	Tie, 1-1	August 21, 2015
9.	691 (Mendive Middle School, Sparks NV)	Fresno State	Loss, 0-3	September 3, 2000
10.	675	UNLV	Tie, 0-0	September 26, 2004

=== Softball ===
Since the program was reinstated in 2003, the softball team has qualified for the NCAA tournament three times (2006, 2008, 2009) and has compiled a record of 3–6 in tournament play. In 2006, Nevada won its first WAC tournament title as Jordan McPherson pitched all 41 innings for Nevada in the WAC tournament, without giving up a single earned run, while striking out 34 on the way to being named tournament MVP.

The 2008 team finished the season ranked in both national Top 25 polls. The Wolf Pack was ranked No. 21 in the USA Today/NFCA Division I Top 25 Poll and was No. 20 in the ESPN.com/USA Softball Collegiate Top 25. Nevada went 44–18 and won the Western Athletic Conference regular season title. That season, Noelle Micka became the first Nevada softball player to earn second team All American and Vanessa Briones was named WAC Player of the Year. She was the first Wolf Pack player to earn the honor. Briones led the way for a program-record six Nevada players on the All-WAC first team. The senior led the WAC with a .429 batting average, including four home runs and 16 RBI in WAC play. She was joined by fellow outfielder Brittany Puzey, who was named to the first team for the second straight season. Puzey batted .339 with seven extra-base hits in WAC games. The Wolf Pack received an at-large bid to the NCAA Regionals and advanced to the championship game of the Los Angeles Regional, where they lost 6–4 to UCLA.

=== Women's swimming and diving ===
The swimming and diving team won the AIAW–Division II national title in 1979 and has won 10 conference championships since 1992. They won the Pacific Collegiate Swim Conference in 1992 followed by the Big West championship five years in a row from 1996 to 2000 and the WAC title in 2007, 2008 and 2009. Nevada won the Mountain West Conference championship in 2016.

Nevada has produced 14 All-Americans and reached its highest national ranking in 2000 at #13. Ten Olympians have been associated with the program. Jian Li You was the diving coach from 1996 until her retirement in 2025. She was a member of the 1980 Chinese Olympic team and a coach for the U.S. Olympic Diving Team.

Coach	Olympic Games	Medals
Neil Harper	1984, 1988	N/A
Jian Li You	1980	N/A
Swimmer	Olympic Games	Medals
Enkhkhuslen Batbayar	2020, 2024	N/A
Liu Limin	1996, 2000	Silver (1996)
Lise Mackie	1992, 1996	Bronze (1996)
May Ooi	1992	N/A
Krysta Palmer (Diving)	2020	Bronze
Natalia Pulido	1992	N/A
Diana Sokołowska	2012	N/A
Chavisa Thaveesupsoonthorn	2004, 2008	N/A

=== Women's tennis ===
See footnote

=== Women's track and field ===
See footnote

=== Women's volleyball ===
The volleyball team has qualified for the NCAA tournament five times in its history, all coming from at-large selections. (1998, 2001, 2002, 2004, 2005). Nevada produced the beach volleyball team known as Team Gorgeous (Michelle More and Suzanne Stonebarger).

== National Championships ==
=== Individual ===
Association	Division	Sport	Year	Event	Individual(s)	Score
NCAA	N/A	Boxing	1959	Welterweight	Joe Bliss	N/A
NCAA	N/A	Boxing	1960	Welterweight	Mills Lane	N/A
NCAA	Division I	Rifle	2002	Air rifle	Ryan Tanoue	392
NCAA	Division I	Skiing	1954	Downhill	Pat Myers	N/A
NCAA	Division I	Skiing	2001	15K Freestyle	Katerina Hanusova Nash	N/A
NCAA	Division I	Skiing	2001	5K Classical	Katerina Hanusova Nash	N/A
NCAA	Division I	Skiing	2002	15K Freestyle	Katerina Hanusova Nash	N/A
NCAA	Division I	Skiing	2002	Giant Slalom	Tommi Viirret	N/A
NCAA	Division I	Swimming & Diving	1999	200-yard Butterfly	Liu Limin	1:53.36
NCAA	Division I	Swimming & Diving	2000	100-meter Butterfly	Liu Limin	57.97
NCAA	Division I	Swimming & Diving	2000	200-meter Butterfly	Liu Limin	2:06.04
NCAA	Division I	Swimming & Diving	2016	1-meter Diving	Sharae Zheng	344.95
NCAA	Division I	Swimming & Diving	2016	3-meter Diving	Sharae Zheng	404.70
NCAA	Division I	Men's Track & Field	1966	High Jump	Otis Burrell	7-1
NCAA	Division I	Men's Track & Field	1990	Discus	Kamy Keshmiri	207-1
NCAA	Division I	Men's Track & Field	1991	Discus	Kamy Keshmiri	218-5
NCAA	Division I	Men's Track & Field	1992	Discus	Kamy Keshmiri	220-0
NCAA	Division I	Men's Track & Field	1994	Decathlon	Enoch Borozinski	7870
NCAA	Division II	Swimming & Diving	1983	200-meter Backstroke	Robin Thein	N/A
AIAW	Division II	Swimming & Diving	1979	50-meter Breaststroke	Ann Belikow	N/A
AIAW	Division II	Swimming & Diving	1979	100-meter Breaststroke	Ann Belikow	N/A
AIAW	Division II	Swimming & Diving	1979	200-meter Breaststroke	Ann Belikow	N/A

=== Team ===
Association	Division	Sport	Year
AIAW	Division II	Swimming & Diving	1979
ASCE	N/A	Concrete Canoe	2008
ASCE	N/A	Concrete Canoe	2014
CCBC*	N/A	Boxing	1964
CCBC*	N/A	Boxing	1968
NCBA	N/A	Boxing	1976
NCBA	N/A	Boxing	1978
NCBA	N/A	Boxing	1991
NCBA	N/A	Boxing	1993
NCBA	N/A	Boxing	2015
NRA	N/A	Rifle	1956

- Between the time the NCAA dropped collegiate boxing (1960) and the formation of the NCBA (1976), Nevada belonged to the California Collegiate Boxing Conference.

== Mascots ==
The Wolf Pack's mascots are anthropomorphized wolves named Alphie, Wolfie Jr and Luna. Alphie took over the duties of cheering from his uncle, Wolfie, in 1999. In 2007, Alphie was joined by his younger brother, Wolfie Jr. A girl mascot named Luna joined the team in 2013.

== Sports no longer sponsored ==
- Men's Boxing - The NCAA stopped sponsoring collegiate boxing in 1960. The team continues to exist under the auspices of the National Collegiate Boxing Association.
- Men's and Women's Skiing - The ski team was founded in 1936. Its NCAA affiliation ended in 2009 due to budget cuts.
- Men's and Women's Gymnastics
- Men's Track & Field - Nevada's Track & Field team was disbanded in 1994. The Wolf Pack produced seventeen first-team All-Americans.
- Rifle - The Nevada rifle team placed second in the 2004 NCAA Rifle team championship, losing to national champion Alaska Fairbanks. On December 15, 2018, the athletic department announced that the rifle team would be discontinued.
