= Utah State Aggies =

Sports program of Utah State University

- University: Utah State University
- Nickname: Aggies
- NCAA: Division I (FBS)
- Conference: Pac-12
- Athletic director: Cameron Walker
- Location: Logan, Utah
- Varsity teams: 16 (7 men's and 9 women's)
- Football stadium: Maverik Stadium
- Basketball arena: Dee Glen Smith Spectrum
- Softball stadium: LaRee & LeGrand Johnson Field
- Soccer stadium: Chuck & Gloria Bell Soccer Field
- Other venues: Wayne Estes Center; Ralph Maughan Track
- Colors: Blue and White
- Mascot: Big Blue
- Fight song: Hail the Utah Aggies
- Website: utahstateaggies.com/index.aspx

Individual and relay NCAA champions
- 6

The Utah State Aggies are the intercollegiate athletic teams that represent Utah State University, located in Logan, Utah. Utah State fields 16 – seven men and nine women – National Collegiate Athletic Association (NCAA) varsity athletic teams. They compete in the Pac-12 Conference (Pac-12). On September 23, 2024, Utah State accepted an offer to leave the Mountain West and join the Pac-12 Conference on July 1, 2026.

== Sports sponsored ==
Men's sports	Women's sports
Basketball	Basketball
Cross country	Cross country
Football	Gymnastics
Golf	Soccer
Tennis	Softball
Track & field^{1}	Track & field^{1}
	Tennis
	Volleyball
^{1} – Track and field includes both indoor and outdoor.

=== Men's basketball ===
Utah State was a member of the Mountain West Conference

The men's basketball team under coaches Stew Morrill (1998–2015) and Craig Smith (2018–2021), won several conference championships and trips to the NCAA Men's Division I Basketball Championship.

=== Women's basketball ===
The women's basketball program began rebuilding in 2003 after a 16-year absence. At the time, USU was the only Division I school that did not have a women's basketball program besides the mostly male Virginia Military Institute and The Citadel. It took eight years for Utah State to post a winning record, finishing the 2010–11 season at 16–15 after reaching the second round of the WNIT. The 2011–12 team finished 21–10 for the first 20-win season in school history, exiting the WNIT in the first round. Following the season, Raegan Pebley, who had been head coach since the return of the sport, was hired away by Fresno State, with Jerry Finkbeiner being hired as her replacement. In 2020, Kayla Ard was hired as the new head coach of the women's basketball team.

=== Men's cross country ===
The men's cross country team has been impressive in recent years, winning the WAC title for the past five years in a row—each year since joining the WAC. Members of the team have garnered numerous conference and regional awards, and have competed in the NCAA Championships.

=== Football ===
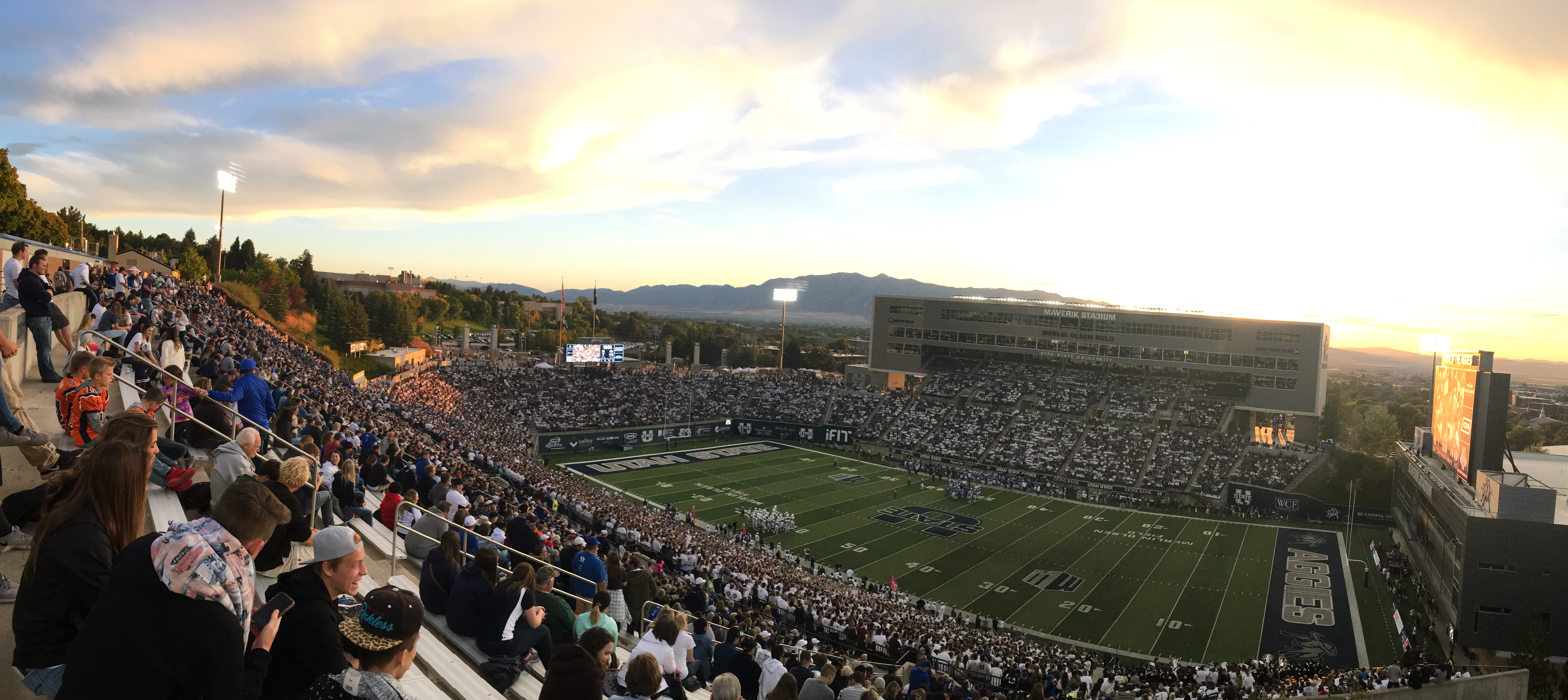
Maverik Stadium during a USU vs. BYU game, September 29, 2017

The football program has a rich history, with distinguished alumni such as Merlin Olsen and Phil Olsen, Bobby Wagner, Nick Vigil, and Jordan Love.

As of January 2016, Aggie football has an overall record of 547–533–31 (.506)

After strong success throughout the mid-20th century, they struggled during most of the next several decades, following two ill-fated stints as an independent program and two more years in the geographically distant Sun Belt Conference after the Big West Conference, which had housed the Aggies since 1978, elected to stop sponsoring football in 2001. USU's other teams remained in that conference until the school was invited to join the Western Athletic Conference (WAC) in 2005. Many attribute the decline to administrators at both Utah and BYU freezing then-superior USU out of the newly formed WAC. They eventually were invited into the WAC after the two other schools had left to help form the Mountain West Conference. Subsequently, both Utah and BYU departed the Mountain West Conference and USU was invited to join that conference, where they currently reside.

From 1980 to 2010, they only had a winning record in three years (all in the '90's). To turn things around, then-athletic director Scott Barnes inked deals with TV stations, replaced the head football coach, raised funds, and accomplished numerous necessary reorganizations, despite the athletics department's financial disadvantages in comparison with other state and conference schools. In large part due to his efforts, USU Athletics was crowned the 2009 National Champion of the Excellence in Management Cup, which seeks to identify the university that wins the most championships with the lowest expenses. The Aggies brought in WAC championships in five sports during the 2008–09 academic year, tied for the most in school history. And since then, the football program has only missed a bowl game twice, winning four bowl games, and finished ranked in the top 25 in the nation twice.

After many years of futility, the Aggies performed better under head coach Gary Andersen, who replaced Brent Guy following the 2008 season. The 2011 campaign was the team's first winning season in many years, resulting in a postseason bowl berth. 2012 has brought the school's first-ever 10-win season and WAC championship (its first outright conference championship since 1936), and national Top 25 rankings in all three major polls. Andersen left USU after the 2012 season and has been replaced by his former offensive coordinator Matt Wells.

The Aggies have played in seventeen bowl games in their history, winning six. The team's first victory came in the 1993 Las Vegas Bowl against Ball State.

USU football is played at Maverik Stadium, which seats 25,100.

=== Golf ===
Golf enjoyed a wealth of success in the early 1980s by alum Jay Don Blake. As a member of the Aggie golf squad, Blake won the NCAA Championship in 1980 and was named NCAA Player of the Year in 1981. He turned pro that year, and in 1987 joined the PGA Tour, where he has one victory and several top-10 finishes, mostly in the early '90s. He has won three times on the Champions Tour.

=== Gymnastics ===
Of the women's sports at USU, gymnastics has probably been most successful historically, heading to the postseason 26 times, including five trips to the national championships. The soccer team finished the 2008 season with a perfect record in conference play, as well as a WAC title. Despite falling in the conference tournament in 2009, Aggie soccer landed three players on the All-WAC first team. The team produced its best record in 2021, finishing the year 13-6-3 and advancing to the semifinals of the conference tournament.

=== Softball ===
The Aggie softball team has appeared in four Women's College World Series, in 1978, 1980, 1981 and 1984, winning the AIAW Division I softball national championship in 1980 and 1981.

=== Men's tennis ===
Men's tennis has advanced to the NCAA Tournament twice over the last five years and has generated multiple all-conference honors. The team has also been highly competitive at ITA Regional competitions, as the Aggies advanced to the finals of the 2021 championship.

=== Men's track and field ===
The USU men's track and field team has long enjoyed success, with a bevy of All-American athletes from decades past. In recent years, the team has also won WAC championships in 2007, 2009, and 2010 (outdoor) and 2008 and 2010 (indoor).

=== Volleyball ===
In 1978, the Aggie volleyball team defeated UCLA to win the AIAW Large College volleyball national championship. The following year in 1979, the team fell to Hawaii in the national championship match. The volleyball team shared the regular-season Mountain West Championship in 2021.

== Athletic facilities ==
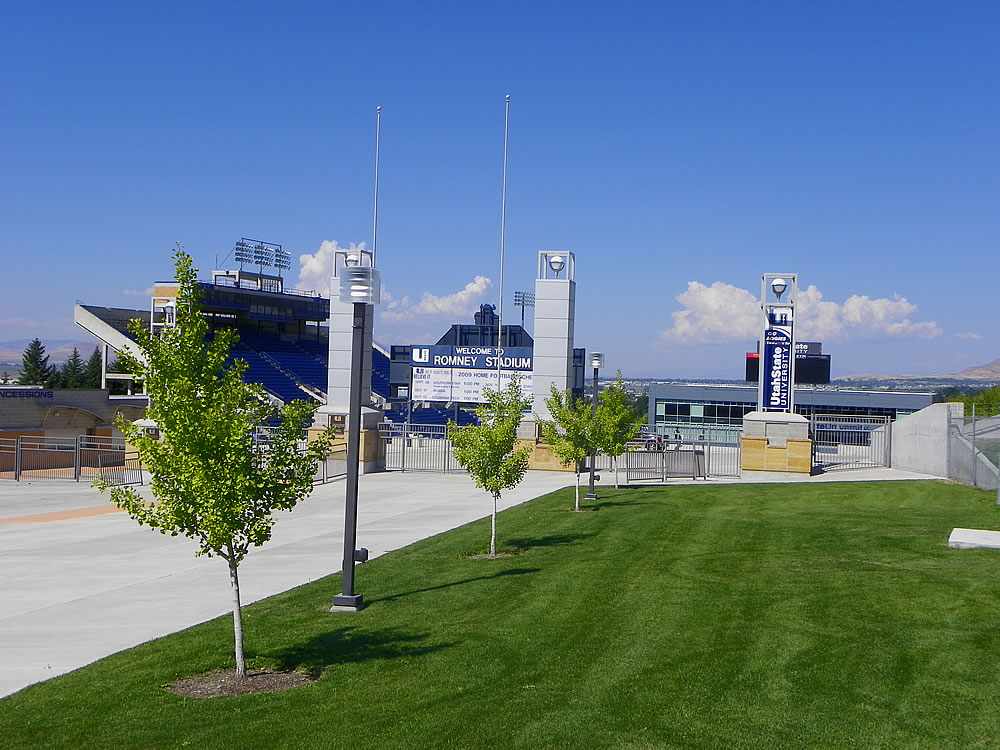
Maverik Stadium from outside the south entrance

The most used sports venue is the Dee Glen Smith Spectrum, where basketball, volleyball, and gymnastics events are held. TV and radio announcers visiting the Smith Spectrum for the first time commonly state that the spectrum is one of the loudest basketball venues in the country with one of the most enthusiastic crowds in the country, rivaling Cameron Indoor Stadium at Duke University. It is a tradition that near the beginning of games the crowd chooses one player from the other team who commits a blatant foul, taunts the crowd, etc., and every time that player touches the ball the entire crowd boos loudly until he passes the ball. This pressure on opposing players created by this tradition has cut many outstanding players down to below average while at the Spectrum.

The football team plays in Maverik Stadium, slightly north and west of the main campus. The stadium had natural grass until 2004, when artificial turf was installed. Romney Stadium is built on a hillside, and appears much smaller from outside than it actually is, as much of the seating and the field are below street level. In 2009, the field at Romney Stadium was named Merlin Olsen Field, in honor of the Hall of Fame alumnus.

== Aggie name and mascot ==
The name Aggies, short for Agriculturalists, is a fixture of many universities that began as land-grant and agricultural colleges. Early USU sports teams were sometimes simply referred to as the "Farmers" as well as the Aggies, though the former name was never official. Beginning in the 1930s, an image of a "bean-pole farmer" with a pitchfork in hand and hay stalk in mouth began to be used to represent the college, though this too was never made official, and disappeared following the transformation into a full-fledged university in 1957.

During the late 1960s and early 1970s, a movement began on campus to shed the Aggie name in favor of the Utah State Highlanders, but the movement met with widespread opposition and was abandoned. The name "Highlanders" was a nod to the university's historic ideological tie to Scotland, which came about very early on in the college's history, mostly due to the university's setting on a hill in a high mountain valley. In fact, for a brief period, USU's teams were indeed nicknamed the "Scotsmen" as well, and a remnant of this era lives on in the current and popular fight song "The Scotsman".

There is a first person account of "The Scotsman" being around during or before 1954. President Dixon sang a solo of “The Scotsman” at frosh orientation in 1954 and the person was present at that orientation.

=== Big Blue ===
A November 7, 1901, meeting decided that the college's official color would be blue. It originated as more of a royal blue, morphing fully into navy by the 1920s. The term "Big Blue" came about in the 1960s simply to refer to the uniform color, as opposed to any particular mascot. The image of a bull first appeared on a football game program in 1975, and the following year it was adopted as USU's mascot.

For a few years, USU used an actual white bull, painted blue, which was brought to sporting events and corralled on the sidelines. However, when the Smith Spectrum was built, there were concerns with the bull ruining the floor. For a short time, the bull was outfitted with red rubber boots, which did not pan out and the bull was retired.

In 1987, USU Student Athletics Vice President John Mortensen decided that Utah State should still have a mascot and spent $750 on a costume for Big Blue. The costume was somewhat of a disappointment because it was royal blue, not navy, had real animal horns, and was not easy to move around in.

The costume has since undergone at least one redesign.

An example of Big Blue's antics is a tradition of rappelling from the JumboTron to kick off team introductions for men's basketball games. It is said the Big Blue enjoys crowdsurfing.

As of 2003, four of the six people who had played the Big Blue role had gone on to become mascots for professional sports teams.

== Utah State traditions ==
=== Hail the Utah Aggies ===
The Aggies' principal fight song is known as "Hail the Utah Aggies" as well as simply "Fight Song". It was composed in 1933 by Mickey Hart, with words by Darwin Jepsen and Mark Hart. The main verse is sung twice, with the chant once in between.

=== The Scotsman ===
The popular Scotsman song was composed by student Ebenezer J. Kirkham, class of 1918. At athletic events, "The Scotsman" is often sung immediately following "Hail the Utah Aggies". The words are sung twice through without a break, accompanied by synchronized arm gestures originally created by a small students in Section K of the Spectrum in the early 90s (thought to represent milking of a cow by hand, but was actually mimicking the WWF Bushwackers entrance to an arena) the gesture eventually spread to the entire student section. The final line of the second repetition typically rises to a full shout.

Show me the Scotsman who doesn't love the thistle.
Show me the Englishman who doesn't love the rose.
Show me the true blooded Aggie from Utah
Who doesn't love the spot . . .
Where the sagebrush grows!

=== The Hurd ===
The HURD is the student section at Utah State University. The HURD started in 2006 and has grown every year since. Beginning as a club in the USU Student Association, the HURD moved to total inclusion of the entire USU student body in the summer of 2012. At capacity, the HURD fills 6,500 seats at Romney Stadium for USU Football and 4,000 seats in the Dee Glen Smith Spectrum for USU Basketball. The HURD helps organize major activities, with leadership and help from the HURD Committee, such as tailgates, camp outs, away game watch parties and more for the student body and community. Drawing from its motto "Be Seen. Be Loud. Be HURD!", the HURD ensures that the teams who visit Utah State University will experience the best atmosphere in the country for collegiate athletics by being known as one of the craziest student sections in the country.

== Championships ==
=== National championships ===
==== Team ====
- Volleyball (AIAW): 1978
- Softball (AIAW WCWS): 1980, 1981
- Handball:
  - Men's Div. 2 Singles: 2013 – Ryan Campbell, 2014 – Jonathan Larson
  - Men's Div. 2 Doubles: 2013 – Ryan Campbell & Jonathan Larson
  - Men's Intermediate: 2015 – Andy Graves
  - Men's Div. 3C: 2017 – Jarod Jensen
  - Women's A: 2017 – Lindsey Boetler
  - Women's B: 2016 – Jeanne Hancock

==== Individual ====
- Men’s Golf: 1
- Men’s Indoor Track: 2
- Men’s Outdoor Track: 3

As of August 31, 2024 Utah State has won 6 NCAA individual national championships.

=== Conference championships ===
Listed here are the conference championships from the founding of Utah State athletics to the present in the Mountain West Conference As of July 1, 2024.

Men

- Baseball: 1919, 1920, 1921
- Basketball: 1918, 1926, 1930, 1935, 1936, 1980, 1995, 1997, 1998, 2000, 2002, 2004, 2008, 2009, 2010, 2011, 2019, 2020, 2024, 2026
- Cross Country: 1992, 1993, 1994, 2002, 2005, 2006, 2007, 2008, 2009, 2011, 2019
- Football: 1921, 1935, 1936, 1946, 1960, 1961, 1978, 1979, 1993, 1996, 1997, 2012, 2021
- Tennis: 2016, 2017, 2018, 2024
- Indoor Track: 1993, 2008, 2010, 2011
- Outdoor Track: 1915, 1924, 1925, 1926, 1927, 1947, 1994, 1995, 1996, 1998, 1999, 2002, 2003, 2007, 2009, 2010, 2011
- Wrestling: 1978, 1979

Women

- Basketball: 1974
- Cross Country: 1998, 2006, 2008
- Gymnastics: 1992, 1996, 1998, 2001, 2005, 2022
- Indoor Track: 1994, 2012
- Outdoor Track: 1993, 1994, 1995, 1996, 1997, 1998, 1999, 2012
- Soccer: 2008, 2010, 2011, 2012, 2023
- Softball: 1981, 1982, 1986, 1987, 1993
- Volleyball: 1977, 1978, 1979, 1980, 1981, 1999, 2010, 2012, 2021, 2022, 2023
