= San Diego State Aztecs women's soccer =

College women's soccer team

- Founded: 1989
- University: San Diego State University
- Head coach: Mike Friesen (20th season)
- Conference: Pac-12
- Location: San Diego, California
- Stadium: SDSU Sports Deck (capacity: 3,000)
- Nickname: Aztecs
- Colors: Scarlet and black

NCAA tournament Round of 16
- 1998, 2012

NCAA tournament Round of 32
- 1998, 2009, 2012

NCAA tournament appearances
- 1998, 1999, 2009, 2012, 2013, 2014, 2017

The San Diego State Aztecs women's soccer is the team that is the women's soccer program that represents San Diego State University (SDSU). The Aztecs compete in NCAA Division I as a member of the Pac-12 Conference. The team plays its home games at the SDSU Sports Deck.

San Diego State's first women's soccer team was fielded in 1989. The Aztecs are coached by Mike Friesen.

== All-time season results ==
Legend
Conference champions
Conference Tournament Champions

Season	Head coach	Record		Conference Standing	Conference Tournament	Postseason
Season	Head coach	Conference	Overall	Conference Standing	Conference Tournament	Postseason
Western Athletic Conference
1989	Chuck Clegg		5–4			
1990	Lesle Gallimore		7–5–1			
1991	Lesle Gallimore		9–6–3			
1992	Lesle Gallimore		6–7–3			
1993	Lesle Gallimore		10–7–2			
1994	Chuck Clegg		10–8			
1995	Chuck Clegg		13–5–3		Champion	
1996	Chuck Clegg	4–1	16–7	T-1st (Pacific)	Runner-up	
1997	Chuck Clegg	2–3	10–6–1	5th (Pacific)		
1998	Chuck Clegg	6–0	19–3–1	1st (Pacific)	Champion	NCAA Sweet 16
Mountain West Conference
1999	Chuck Clegg	5–1	15–7	T-1st	Runner-up	NCAA 1st Round
2000	Chuck Clegg	4–2	8–13	T-2nd	Semi-finals	
2001	Chuck Clegg	2–3–1	6–11–1	5th	1st round	
2002	Chuck Clegg	3–3	13–7	4th	Semi-finals	
2003	Chuck Clegg	2–3–1	7–10–2	4th	1st round	
2004	Mike Giuliano	3–1–2	8–7–6	T-2nd	Runner-up	
2005	Mike Giuliano	2–3–2	11–9–2	6th	Semi-finals	
2006	Mike Giuliano	2–3–2	6–11–3	T-5th	1st round	
2007	Mike Friesen	4–2–1	9–8–3	2nd	Semi-finals	
2008	Mike Friesen	2–4–1	6–10–3	6th	1st round	
2009	Mike Friesen	5–0–2	15–4–5	2nd	Champions	NCAA 2nd Round
2010	Mike Friesen	5–2	8–10–3	3rd	Semi-finals	
2011	Mike Friesen	4–1–1	10–7–3	2nd	Semi-finals	
2012	Mike Friesen	7–0	21–2–1	1st	Champions	NCAA Sweet 16
2013	Mike Friesen	9–1	13–7–2	1st	Champions	NCAA 1st Round
2014	Mike Friesen	9–2	15–5–2	1st	Champions	NCAA 1st Round
2015	Mike Friesen	10–1	15–4–1	1st	Runner-up	
2016	Mike Friesen	6–2–3	10–7–4	3rd	Runner-up	
2017	Mike Friesen	7–2–2	12–8–2	T-2nd	Champions	NCAA 1st Round
2018	Mike Friesen	4–4–2	6–10–3	8th		
2019	Mike Friesen	8–3	10–9–1	T-1st	Runner-up	
2020	Mike Friesen	8–3	8–3	2nd	Cancelled due to COVID-19 pandemic	
2021	Mike Friesen	5–4–2	7–11–2	4th	1st round	
2022	Mike Friesen	5–3–3	7–6–8	T-4th	Semi-finals	
2023	Mike Friesen	9–1–1	14–3–3	1st	Semi-finals	

== Postseason ==
The Aztecs women's soccer team have an NCAA Division I Tournament record of 4–7 through seven appearances.

Year	Round	Opponent	Result
1998	Second round Third round	USC; Portland	W 1–0; L 0–5
1999	First round	San Diego	L 1–2
2009	First round Second round	San Diego; UCLA	W 1–0; L 0–5
2012	First round Second round Third round	CSU Northridge; Cal; UCLA	W 3–0; W 2–1; L 0–3
2013	First round	UCLA	L 0–3
2014	First round	Cal	L 2–3
2017	First round	UCLA	L 1–3

== Head coaches ==
Head coach	Seasons	Overall	Pct.
Chuck Clegg	1989, 1994–2003	122–81–8	.597
Lesle Gallimore	1990–1993	32–25–9	.537
Dr. Mike Giuliano	2004–2006	25–27–11	.400
Mike Friesen	2007–present	186–114–44	.724
