= Abram Salmon Benenson =

American physician

Abram Salmon Benenson (1914 – December 15, 2003) was an authority in public health, preventive medicine, military medicine, and "shoe-leather" epidemiology. He was best known as the editor-in-chief (1970 to 1995) for the Control of Communicable Diseases Manual of the American Public Health Association. His tenure as editor was so lengthy that the manual was often known as the "Benenson Book".

== Biography ==
Benenson graduated from Cornell Medical School in New York City and interned for 3 years before entering the U.S. Army Medical Corps. He earned board certifications in pathology, preventive medicine and public health, and microbiology. His military career included assignments as commanding officer, Tropical Research Medical Laboratory in San Juan, Puerto Rico, and as director of Experimental Medicine, Camp Detrick, Maryland; of Division of Communicable Disease and Immunology at the Walter Reed Army Institute of Research (WRAIR); of the Pakistan–Southeast Asia Treaty Organization (SEATO) Cholera Research Laboratory in Dacca, Bangladesh, and of the Gorgas Memorial Laboratory in Panama. He retired from the military in 1962 as a colonel.

Benenson then served on numerous commissions and committees throughout his long civilian career, for which his expertise in smallpox, cholera, vaccines, and biological warfare was utilized to make public health policy decisions at both state and federal levels. Highlights of his 60-year medical career included involvement in the eradication of smallpox (1979); the development of the jet injector for vaccines and of oral rehydration for the victims of debilitating diarrhea; AIDS, cholera, and laboratory technology. He subsequently held academic positions at the Jefferson Medical College, Philadelphia, Pennsylvania; the Department of Community Medicine, University of Kentucky College of Medicine in Lexington; and the Division of Epidemiology and Biostatistics at the Graduate School of Public Health at San Diego State University in California.

== Awards and honors ==
- Joseph E. Smadel Memorial lecture (1981)
- Commander's Award for Civilian Service (1983)
- K. F. Meyer Gold-Headed Cane from the American Veterinary Epidemiological Society (1984).
- Distinguished Civilian Service Award (1990)
- American Public Health Association's Award for Excellence in (1991)
- American Public Health Association's John Snow Award (1992)
- The Benenson Distinguished Lecture, inaugurated on 13 April 2007, in conjunction with the 25th anniversary of the Graduate School of Public Health, San Diego State University will be an annual lecture series at the GSPH.
