= Hepner Hall =

- U.S. Historic district – Contributing property
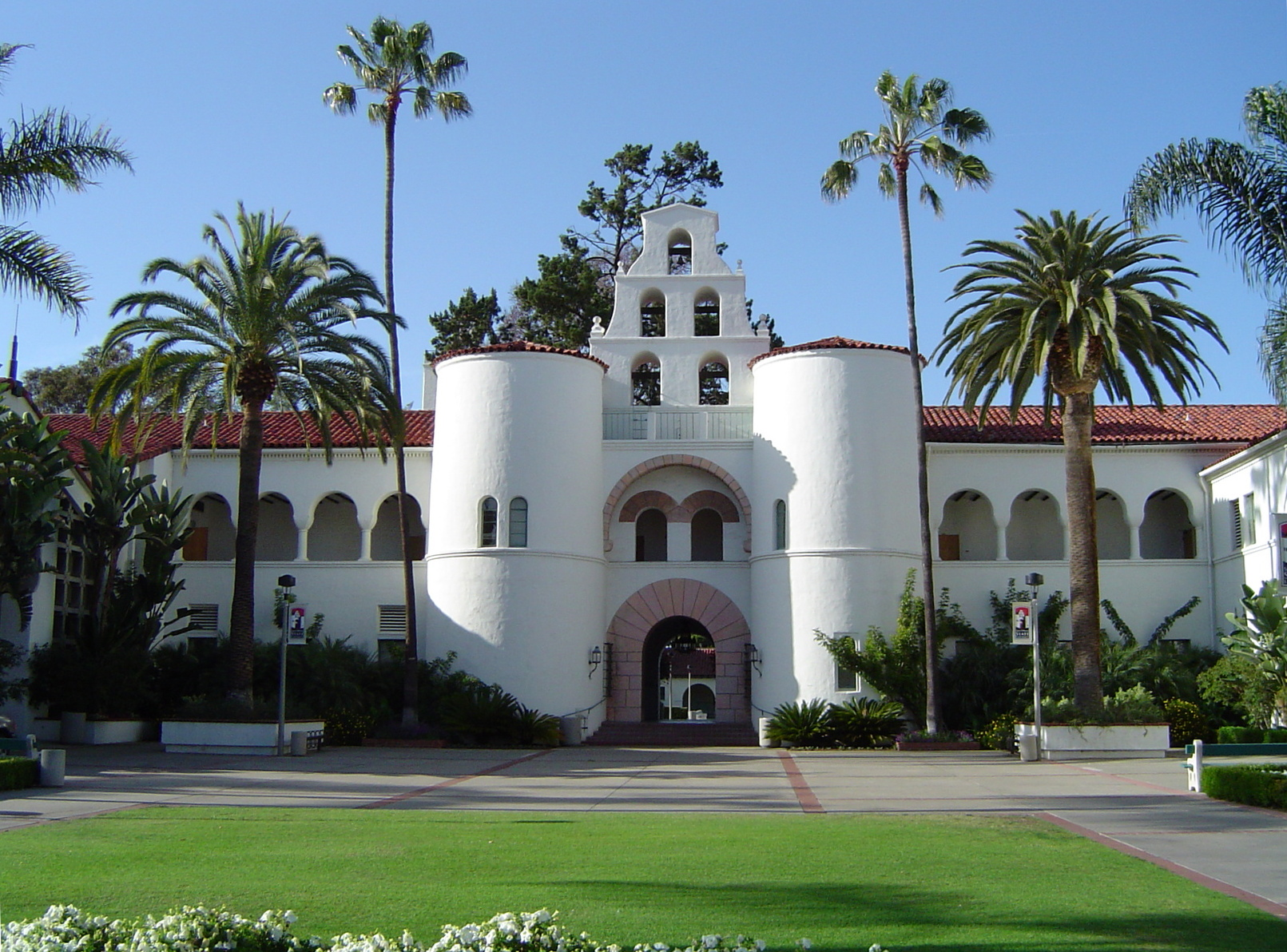
- Hepner Hall on the SDSU campus

- Location within California Location within the United States
- Location: 5300 Campanile Dr., San Diego, California
- Coordinates: 32°46′33″N 117°4′16″W
- Architect: Howard Spencer Hazen
- Architectural style: Mission/Spanish Revival
- Part of: San Diego State College (ID97000924)
- Added to NRHP: September 4, 1997

Hepner Hall is an academic building at San Diego State University (SDSU). The original entrance to the university, it is the oldest building on the campus. It was designed by the senior architectural designer of the California Division of the State Architect, Howard Spencer Hazen, and completed in 1931. Hepner Hall is regarded and commonly used as a symbol of the university and its campus.

The building lies north of Malcolm A. Love Library at the entrance to the Campanile Walkway and main quad. Hepner Hall is home to SDSU's School of Social Work, along with the Department of Gerontology and the University Center on Aging. Several faculty offices and research centers also are housed in Hepner Hall, along with an assortment of classrooms and lecture halls.

== Symbol of the SDSU campus ==
Hepner Hall is the symbol of the campus, with its Mission Revival Style architecture, open-faced bell tower and archway. It is the most photographed building on campus. The tower bells are rung only once a year, during the yearly commencement ceremonies.

=== SDSU logo and seal ===
Hepner Hall is the centerpiece of SDSU's revised logo and presidential seal, which were unveiled in 2004.

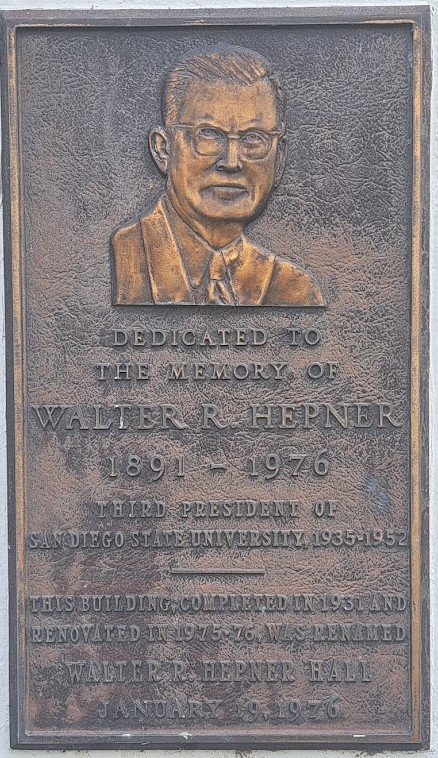
Walter R. Hepner (1897-1976)

== Architecture ==
Entrance to the building is gained through the building's impressive portales, which are framed by turquoise and white tile. Two massive turrets frame the Catalan-style archway, which is topped by a Mission-style bell tower (campanario). Inside the archway is a ribbed Moorish-style arch vaulted ceiling with a simulated Moorish wrought iron lantern hanging from its center.

== History ==
One of the original buildings on the SDSU campus, originally Hepner Hall was the Arts and Letters Building. It was renamed in 1976 in honor of Walter R. Hepner, President of the university from 1935 to 1952. The building is listed on the National Register of Historic Places.

== See also ==
- Aztec Center
- Hardy Memorial Tower
- Malcolm A. Love Library
- San Diego State University
