= Scott Riggs (radio personality) =

American radio personality (born 1969)

Scott Riggs (born September 29, 1969) is an American radio personality. He is the Director of Radio Programming at Slacker, Inc. where he programs the Alternative and Indie Hits radio stations as well as oversees the programming for the entire station line-up.

== Radio background ==
Riggs started his career in radio at KCR (SDSU's College Radio) in 1992 and worked as a DJ on every air shift offered at the station. After less than six months at KCR, Riggs became the Program Director and remained at that position for several years until he advanced to the position of Operations Manager. His tenure at KCR lasted over four years until he left in February 1997.

Riggs secured his first Broadcast radio job in San Diego, California, in 1995, taking the overnight shift at 102.9 KKBH-FM (The Beach). In 1996, he moved over to 92/5 XHRM-FM (The Flash/Independent Radio) co-hosting the local show (The Local Fix) with his younger brother Jason Riggs, producing the morning show and working weekends for Program Director Mike Halloran. He left 92/5 in 1998 when the programming rights of the station were sold to Jacor and the station flipped formats to "Old Skool R&B".

In 2001, Riggs was recruited by Halloran at another independent alternative station in San Diego, 92/1 KFSD-FM (Premium Radio). There he co-hosted the local show (Go Loco) with Rick Savage, a new music show, an interview show (Coup D'état) and work various air shifts throughout the week. In 2003, when 92/1 started negotiations to sell the signal to KSON-FM, Riggs was hired by the popular San Diego rocker, ROCK 105.3 KIOZ-FM where he hosted an alternative/indie rock show (The Inside Track) and a unique interview show (Guerilla Radio) on Sunday nights. In January 2007, Riggs left ROCK 105.3 to concentrate on his job as Director of Radio Programming at Slacker, Inc.
