= SSRL =

SSRL is an acronym that may refer one of two university laboratories in the United States of America:

- Stanford Synchrotron Radiation Lightsource at Stanford University at an off-campus location in Menlo Park, California
- Social Science Research Laboratory at San Diego State University in San Diego, California
