= KCR =

KCR may refer to:

- Kilgore College Rangerettes, the world's first precision dance group
- K. Chengalaraya Reddy, first Chief Minister of the former Indian state of Mysore
- K. Chandrashekar Rao, the first and former Chief Minister of the Indian state of Telangana
- Kansas City Royals, a Major League Baseball team
- Karachi Circular Railway, the proposed metro rail system of Karachi, Pakistan
- Kienning Colloquial Romanized, a romanization system of the Northern Min language
- KCR (San Diego State University), a student-run radio station in San Diego, California, United States
- Kowloon–Canton Railway (disambiguation)
- KCR, a landmark crossroads in Kimmage, Dublin, Ireland
