= Thomas B. Day =

American scientist and academic administrator (1932–2021)

- Born: Thomas Brennock Day; March 7, 1932; New York City, New York, U.S.
- Died: June 15, 2021 (aged 89); San Diego, California, U.S.
- Education: University of Notre Dame; Cornell University
- Occupation: President of San Diego State University
- Spouse: Anne Kohlbrenner (m. 1953; died 2013)
- Children: 9
- Scientific career
- Fields: Theoretical physics
- Thesis: Modes of de-excitation of mu-mesic atoms. (1957)

Thomas Brennock Day (March 7, 1932 – June 15, 2021) was an American scientist and university administrator. He served as the president of San Diego State University (SDSU) from 1978 to 1996.

== Early life ==
Day was born in New York City on March 7, 1932. He was the youngest of six children of an insurance salesman and department-store clerk. His father died when Day was three years old. His interest in mathematics and science was piqued after reading science fiction and listening to stories from his older brother, an engineer who was employed on railroad bridges and tunnels. Day later attended Catholic boarding schools and was awarded a scholarship to attend college. He studied at the University of Notre Dame on the recommendation of his mother, graduating with a Bachelor of Science in Physics in 1952. He went on to obtain a Doctor of Philosophy in Physics from Cornell University in 1957.

== Career ==
Day first worked as a research assistant and later a professor in the physics department at the University of Maryland in College Park, specializing in theoretical and experimental physics. In 1970, Day became the Vice Chancellor for Academic Planning and Policy at the College Park campus and was later appointed Vice Chancellor for Academic Affairs at the Baltimore campus. Eight years later, he was appointed the sixth president of SDSU.

During his tenure, Day was credited with turning SDSU into a major public research university on par with the University of California system by increasing grants and research awards. He was also responsible for expanding the campus infrastructure of SDSU, inaugurating a North County campus in Vista – the precursor of California State University San Marcos – and helping to establish the present-day School of Public Health and the School of Communication. He advocated for affirmative action programs and selected Mary Alice Hill in 1983 to be the first female athletic director at a university with a Division I-A football program. Facing budget shortfalls in 1992, Day proposed sharp cuts that would have eliminated whole departments and laid off faculty. In August 1992, faculty passed a vote of no confidence in Day and asked the California State University Board of Trustees to replace him. An improvement in the budget situation led to the cuts being rescinded, but Day remained unpopular on campus, and was ultimately asked to resign, ostensibly for health reasons.

Day was a member of the National Science Board from 1984 to 1996 and a vice-chairman from 1990 to 1994. He was also a Senior Fellow of the California Council on Science and Technology and a former board member.

== Personal life ==
Day married Anne Kohlbrenner (June 19, 1930 – March 9, 2013) in 1953. They met at a party while attending Notre Dame. Together, they had nine children. They remained married for 60 years until 2013, when she died at the age of 82 due to complications from renal failure.

Day died on the evening of June 15, 2021, at an assisted living center in Rancho Bernardo, San Diego. He was 89 years old.
