= San Diego State University College of Engineering =

Coordinates: 32°46′39″N 117°4′14″W

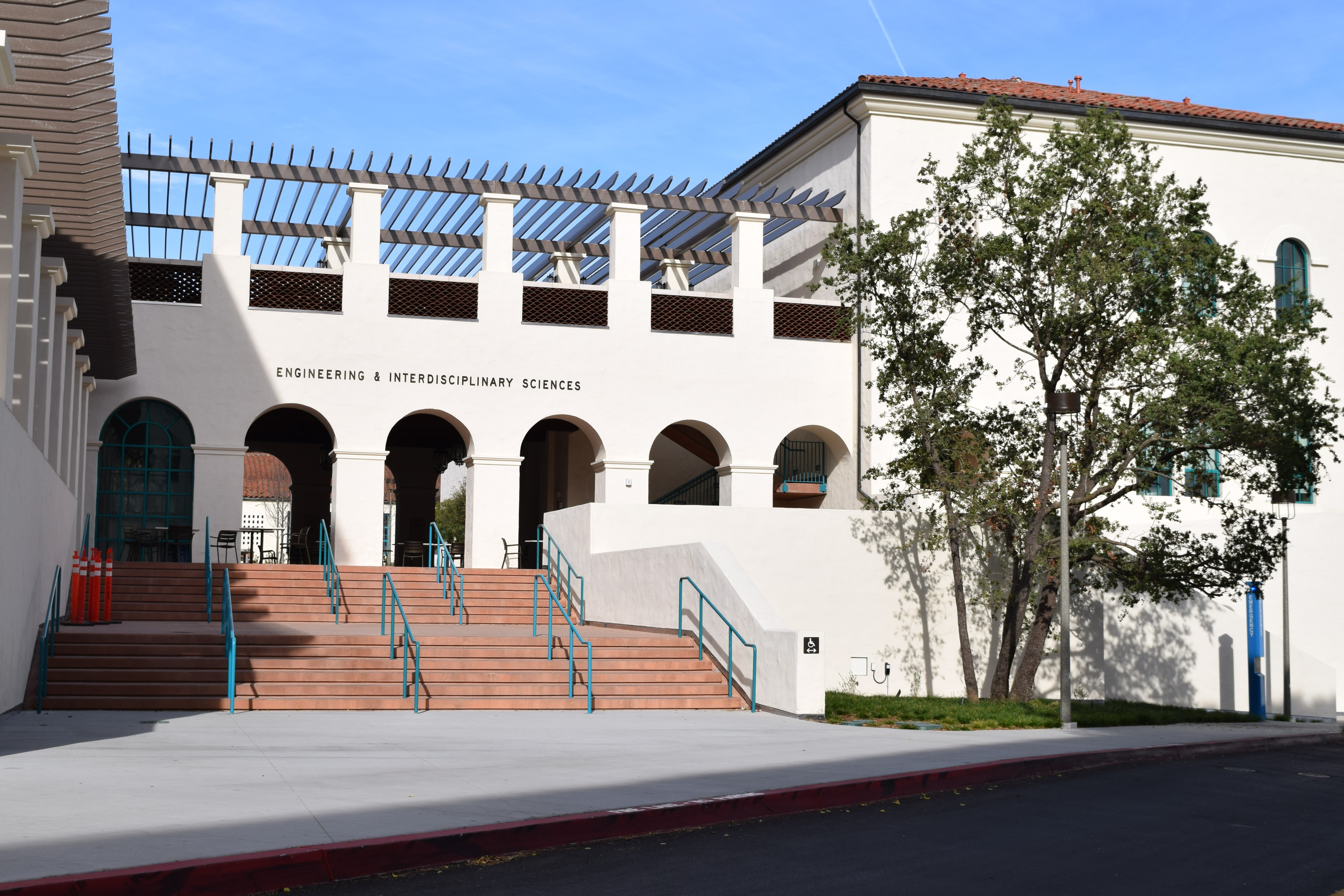
- Motto: "Leadership Starts Here"
- Type: Public
- Established: 1961
- Parent institution: San Diego State University
- Dean: Eugene Olevsky
- Students: 4,103
- Undergraduates: 3,717
- Postgraduates: 386
- Location: San Diego, California, U.S.
- Campus: Urban
- Website: www.engineering.sdsu.edu

The San Diego State University College of Engineering provides San Diego State University (SDSU) students with undergraduate and graduate engineering education. The College of Engineering offers eight degree programs. The aerospace engineering, civil engineering, computer engineering, electrical engineering, environmental engineering, mechanical engineering, and construction engineering programs are accredited by the Engineering Accreditation Commission of ABET.

== Academics ==
=== Degrees ===
The degrees available through the College of Engineering include: Bachelor of Science (BS), MA, Master of Engineering, MS, Ed.D., Ph.D.

== Special Degrees ==
- The Master of Engineering degree is an interdisciplinary program with the College of Engineering and the College of Business Administration.
- A joint doctoral program in Engineering Science/Applied Mechanics is available in conjunction with the University of California, San Diego (UC San Diego).
- As of 2005, several new degree programs have been established in bioengineering and in construction engineering.

=== Departments ===
The College of Engineering includes eight academic departments: Aerospace Engineering, Bioengineering, Civil Engineering, Construction Engineering, Computer Engineering, Electrical Engineering, Environmental Engineering, and Mechanical Engineering. The aerospace engineering program was ranked #37 among graduate aerospace programs in the United States by the U.S. News & World Report in 2017.

==== Institutes/Research Centers ====
- Communication Systems and Signal Processing Institute
- Concrete Materials Research Institute
- Energy Engineering Institute
- Center for Industrial Training and Engineering Research CITER

==== Facilities ====
- Advanced Materials Processing Laboratory (AMPL)
- Combustion and Solar Energy Research Laboratory (CSEL)
- Energy Analysis Diagnostic Center
- Environmental Engineering Research Laboratories
- Experimental Mechanics Laboratory
- Facility for Applied Manufacturing Enterprise (FAME)
- Geo-Innovations Research Laboratory
- High Speed and Low Speed Wind Tunnels
- Powder Technology Laboratory
- Real-Time DSP and FPGA Development Laboratory
