= Malcolm Love =

American university administrator (1904-1990)

Malcolm Andrews Love (March 10, 1904 – May 12, 1990) was the eighth president of the University of Nevada (1950–1952) and the fourth president of San Diego State University (1952–1971).

== Early life and education ==
Love was born in Des Moines, Iowa, and received his bachelor's degree from Simpson College in 1927. The same year he married Maude Hale, and they had a daughter. He worked as a junior high school principal in Mashalltown, Iowa from 1927 to 1929, and Superintendent of Schools in Monroe, Iowa, from 1929 to 1934. In 1933, Love received a Master of Arts degree from the University of Iowa, and in 1937 he received his Ph.D. from the same institution.

After working at the University of Toledo as a professor of education in 1937 and 1938, he accepted a position of Dean of Administration at the College of Liberal Arts at Illinois Wesleyan University in 1938. During World War II Love was executive officer in charge of navy training schools at Ohio State University and at Gulfport, Mississippi. He returned to Illinois Wesleyan University in 1945.

In 1948 Love accepted the position of dean of the College of Arts and Sciences at the University of Denver, where he worked until becoming president of the University of Nevada in 1950.

== University of Nevada ==
Love came to the university with the strongest credentials of any chief administrator thus far. His short tenure at the University of Nevada was fraught with budgetary fights with the Nevada legislature. Love was responsible for establishing the Las Vegas campus in 1951, which would go on to become the University of Nevada, Las Vegas. In 1950 and 1951, enrollment declined at the university as the number of veterans studying on the GI Bill gradually decreased. The 1951 session of the legislature drastically cut funding for the university. In early 1952 Love resigned his presidency, suggesting the board of regents name Minard W. Stout as his successor.

== San Diego State ==
Love arrived at what was then San Diego State College in 1952. His 19-year tenure was transformative. He helped the institution grow from a liberal arts college into a comprehensive university. In 1966, the Carnegie Corporation named Dr. Love one of the best college presidents in the country. His dream of upgrading the school to university status was achieved in 1971. When he retired later that year, student enrollment had reached more than 30,000, and full-time faculty rose to 1,128.

== Legacy ==
Malcolm A. Love Library opened in 1971 at San Diego State University is the primary academic library building on the campus
