= Hardy Memorial Tower =

- U.S. Historic district – Contributing property
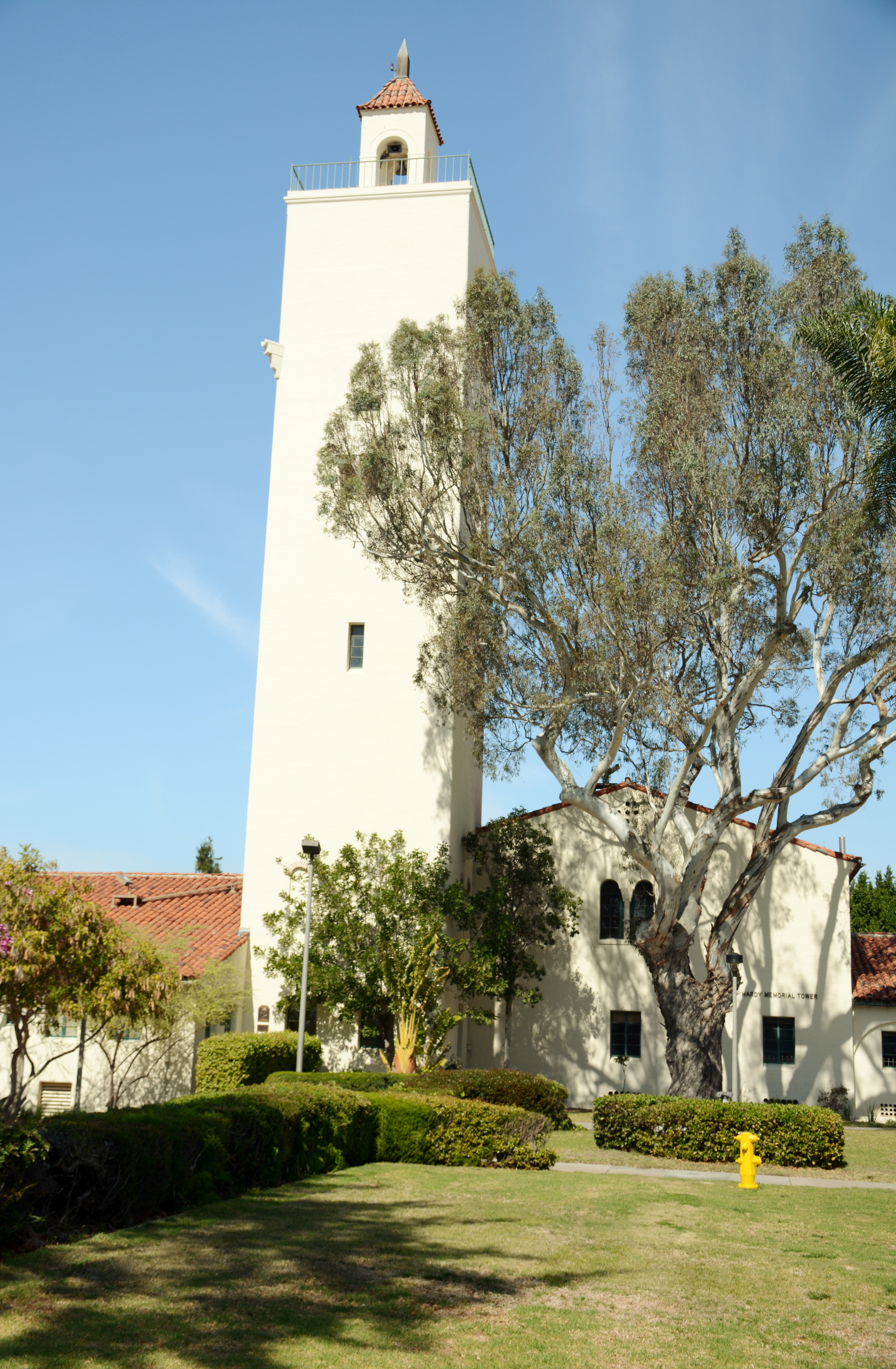
- Hardy Memorial Tower in February 2016

- Location within California Location within the United States
- Location: 5300 Campanile Dr., San Diego, California
- Coordinates: 32°46′33″N 117°4′16″W
- Architect: Howard Spencer Hazen
- Architectural style: Mission/Spanish Revival
- Part of: San Diego State College (ID97000924)
- Added to NRHP: September 4, 1997

Hardy Memorial Tower is a bell tower at San Diego State University (SDSU). Constructed as a Works Progress Administration project in 1931, it is 11 stories (119.1 ft / 36.3 m) tall; it contains the Fletcher Symphonic Carillon (also known as the Fletcher Chimes) (installed 1946), consisting of 204 bells over 6 octaves. Hardy Memorial Tower is part of the original core of the SDSU campus on Montezuma Mesa, and was the university's original library.

== Namesake ==
=== Tower ===
Hardy Memorial Tower is named for Dr. Edward Hardy (1868–1958), who served as President of the State Normal School, SDSU's predecessor institution, from 1910 to 1935. During his tenure the college was relocated to Montezuma Mesa, and its name was changed to San Diego State College. Hardy also served on both the State and City Boards of Education, and in 1936, after his retirement, was appointed executive director of the San Diego Museum (now the Museum of Us). Also named for Dr. Hardy are Hardy Avenue, just south of the present SDSU campus and Hardy Elementary School (located next to the SDSU campus). In 1976, by permission of the statewide Board of Trustees and in gratitude for his contributions to the university, it was named Hardy Memorial Tower. Dr. Hardy's profile graces a bronze plaque designed by San Diego sculptor Donal Hord.

=== Chimes/Bells ===
See also Carillon

The Fletcher Symphonic Carillon was presented as a gift to SDSU by Senator and Mrs. Ed Fletcher in 1946 to commemorate the fiftieth (50th) anniversary of the university and to serve as a memorial to students lost in war.

== Notability ==
Hardy Memorial Tower is recognized as an important symbol of San Diego State University to the greater San Diego community.

In 2004, two historic murals (previously thought to be lost) were uncovered in Hardy Memorial Tower. SDSU received the Governor's Historic Preservation Award in 2008 for efforts in preserving this artwork.

- NRA Packages, a mural painted in 1936 by Genevieve Burgeson Bredo, and for many years thought lost, has been restored and is now on display inside Malcolm A. Love Library. The mural was discovered in 2004 behind ceiling tiles inside SDSU's Hardy Memorial Tower, which was part of the university's first library. Painted in a variety of media, it portrays three men unloading National Recovery Act (NRA) packages from a van near San Diego's Hillcrest neighborhood.
- A second, larger mural, George Sorenson's San Diego Industry, remains in Hardy Memorial Tower. This mural depicts the successive stages of tuna fishing and canning, along with the multi-ethnic work force involved in that industry. The library hopes to remove, restore and relocate this mural.

See Uncovering Local Art and Industry: The Discovery of Hidden WPA-Era Murals at San Diego State University (SDSU Occasional Archeological Paper Series) and SDSU Press Release: Exhibit promises wider exposure for legendary local painter and longtime SDSU art director.

== Location ==
The tower stands in the northwest corner of Hepner Hall Quad. In addition to classrooms and lecture halls, the Hepner Hall Quad houses the offices of the College of Health and Human Services.

== See also ==
- Aztec Student Union
- Hepner Hall
- Malcolm A. Love Library
- List of carillons in the United States
