= San Diego State University College of Arts & Letters =

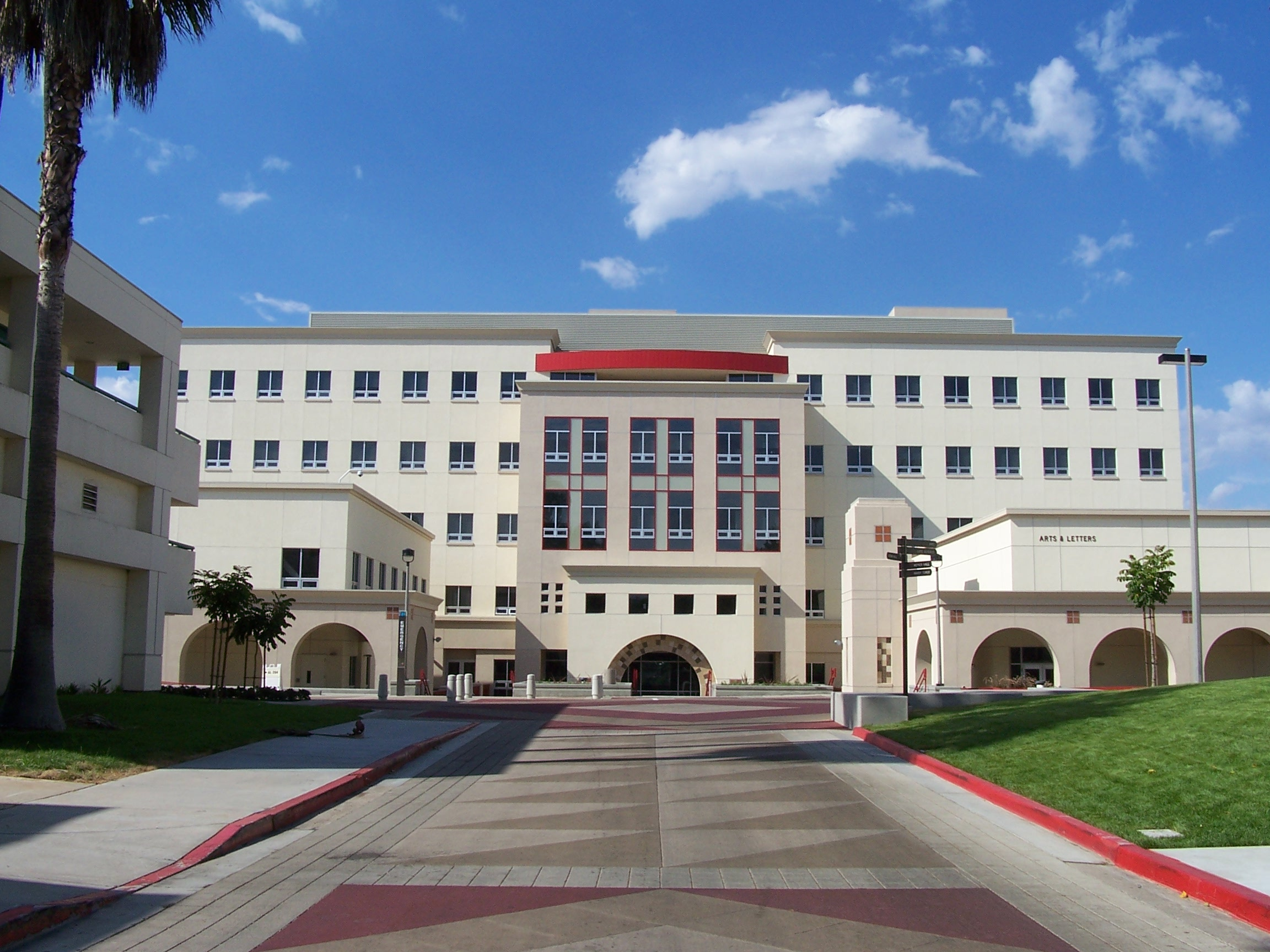
- The Arts & Letters building opened on August 28, 2006.
- Parent institution: San Diego State University
- Location: San Diego, California, U.S. 32.7778°N 117.0735°W
- Website: cal.sdsu.edu

The San Diego State University College of Arts & Letters is a college that provides liberal arts education at San Diego State University (SDSU). Its programs in the humanities and social sciences are offered through nineteen academic departments and a number of interdisciplinary programs, each of which is designed to help students understand their role in society and to develop aesthetic sensibilities. With 300 permanent faculty and many associated lecturers, this is the largest of the seven colleges, and is responsible for over one-third of the instruction at SDSU. Because the college occupies an important role in general education, virtually all SDSU students take courses offered here.

== Academics ==
=== Degrees ===
- Bachelor of Arts (B.A.)
- Master of Arts (M.A.)
- Doctor of Education (Ed.D.)
- Doctor of Philosophy (Ph.D.)

=== Degree programs ===
The College of Arts & Letters includes several degree programs housed in 19 academic departments:

- Africana Studies
- American Indian Studies
- Anthropology
- Asian and Pacific Studies
- Chicana and Chicano Studies
- Classics
- Comparative International Studies
- Comparative Literature
- Economics
- English
- European Studies
- French
- Geography
- German
- History
- Humanities
- International Business
- International Security and Conflict Resolution
- Italian
- Japanese
- Modern Jewish Studies
- Latin American Studies
- Lesbian, Gay, Bisexual, Transsexual, Queer+ Studies
- Liberal Arts and Sciences
- Linguistics
- Philosophy
- Political Science
- Study of Religion
- Rhetoric & Writing Studies
- Russian
- Social Science
- Sociology
- Spanish & Portuguese
- Sustainability
- Urban Studies
- Women's Studies - The first Women's Studies Program in the United States.

=== Special programs ===
- Institute for International Security and Conflict Resolution (ISCOR)

==== Institutes and research centers ====
- Behner Stiefel Center for Brazilian Studies
- Center for International Business Education & Research (CIBER)
- Center for Information Convergence and Strategy (CICS)
- National Center for the Study of Children’s Literature
- Center for War and Society
- Institute for Regional Studies of the Californias (ISRC)
- International Institute for Ethics
- Japan Research Institute (Japan Studies Institute)
- Lipinsky Institute for Judaic Studies
- Chinese Studies Institute

==== Special facilities ====
- Social Science Research Laboratory (SSRL)
- The Stephen and Mary Birch Foundation Center for Earth Systems Analysis Research (CESAR)

==== Publications ====
- San Diego State University Press – the oldest university press in the California State University system, with noted specializations in Border Studies, Critical Theory, Latin American Studies, and Cultural Studies.
- Pacific Review – magazine published by undergraduate and graduate students in the Department of English and Comparative Literature at San Diego State University.

Academic journal

- SDSU Occasional Archaeological Paper series
- Poetry International – literary magazine published annually by San Diego State University Press that was established in 1997. The journal has since its 4th issue included a section focusing on poetry in translation from one nation.
