= Malcolm A. Love Library =

Primary library of San Diego State University

Coordinates: 32°46′31″N 117°4′13″W

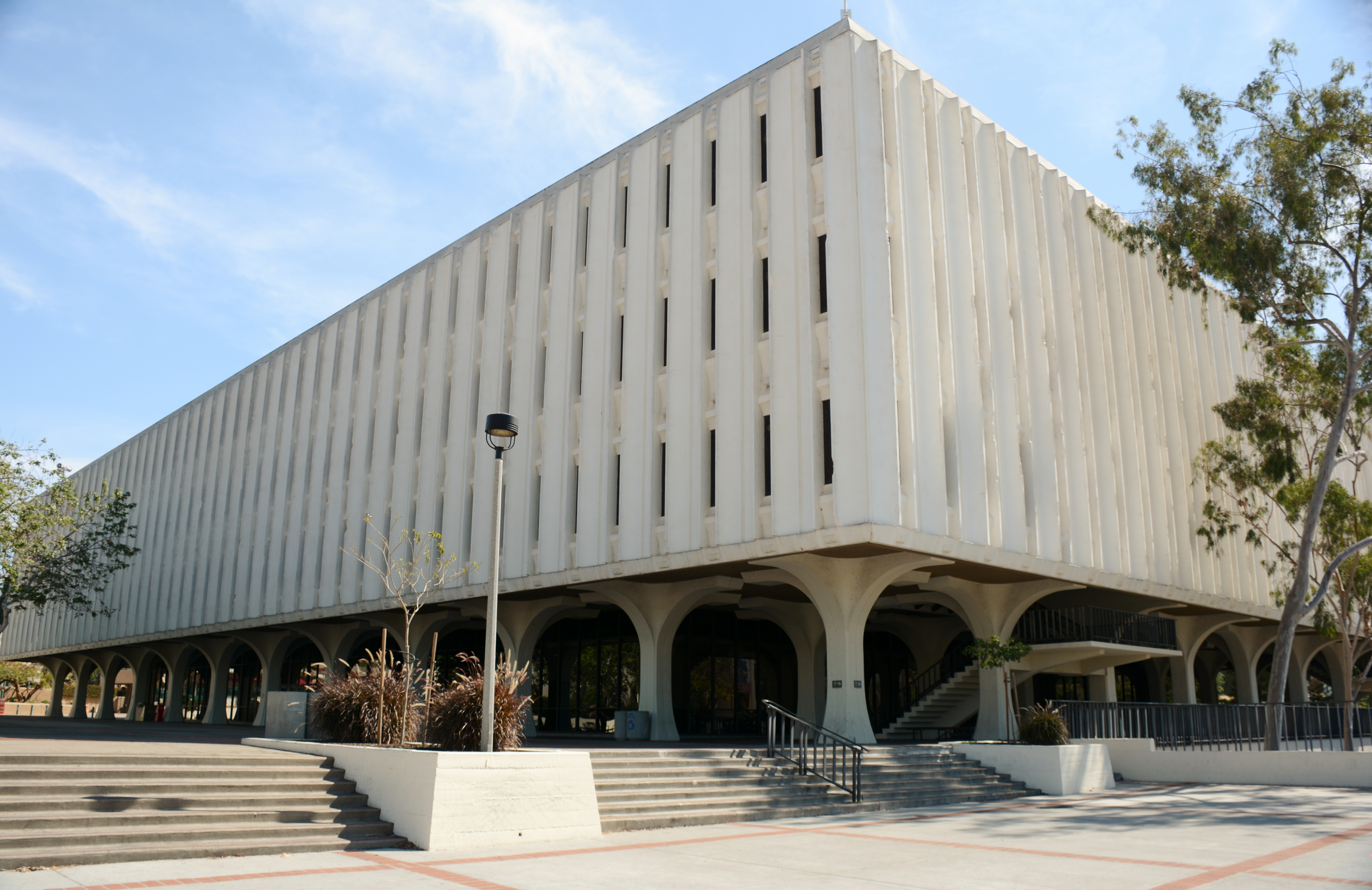
- Established: 1971
- Branches: 1 library

Collection
- Size: 2.2 million (books); 72,697 serials; 4.6 million microfilms 41,000 audio and video, 139,000 E-Books, 6 floors (2 below ground/4 above ground), 500,000-square-feet

Access and use
- Circulation: 488,000

Other information
- Budget: $10.3 million annually
- Director: Scott Walter
- Employees: 133 (18 librarians; 31 library assistants; 27 academic related; 44 student employees)
- Website: http://library.sdsu.edu/

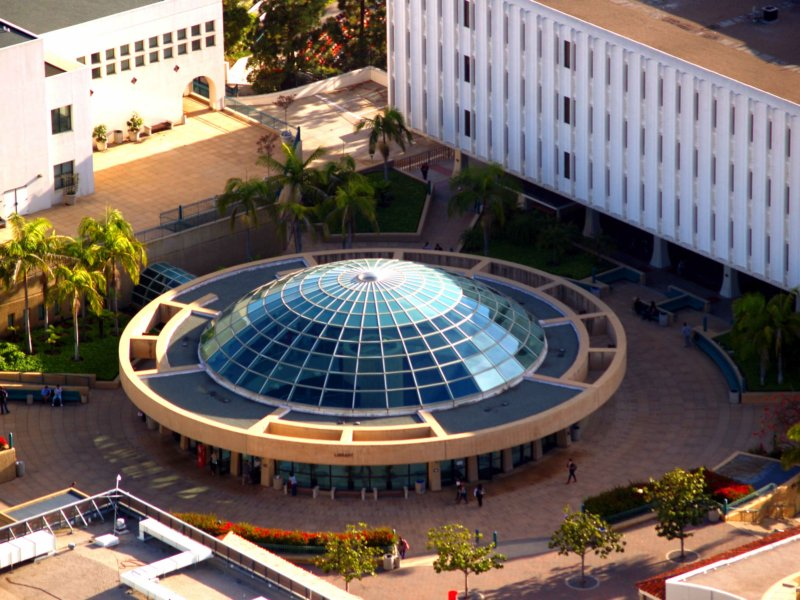
Aerial view of the Library dome

Malcolm A. Love Library (commonly referred to as University Library) is an academic library at San Diego State University (SDSU). The library first opened in 1971. It is named after former university president Malcolm A. Love.

== Library addition ==
The University Library was expanded with the opening of the Library Addition in 1996, including the "Info Dome" as well as "Manchester Hall", which includes the offices of the university's provost and president. The Addition includes the Digital Humanities Center, Writing Center, Esports Engagement Center, as well as study rooms, classrooms, and an extended hours study space.

== Services ==
=== National Center for the Study of Children's Literature ===
In cooperation with SDSU's Department of English and Comparative Literature, the Library is the home to the National Center for the Study of Children's Literature, which received a $1 million gift donation by way of the Christopher D. and Karen Sickels Endowment for Special Collection in Children's Literature.

=== Federal Depository Library ===
The Library has been a selective depository library since 1962, receiving most of the items distributed by the U.S. Government Printing Office through its Federal Depository Library Program (FDLP).

=== State Depository Library ===
The Library is a complete depository library with the California State Depository Library Program.

=== Map library ===
See Map Collection

The Library's Map Collection, consists of over 135,000 sheet maps and more than 1,000 atlases and gazetteers. The collection is worldwide in scope, with an emphasis on San Diego, California, the United States of America, and Baja California. The collection has general, worldwide topographical, nautical, and aeronautical coverage. Most of the collection dates from 1945 to the present.

=== Special Collections ===
See Special Collections and University Archives - Collections

The Library's Special Collections and University Archives (SCUA) houses rare, fine, unique, and valuable books, periodicals, manuscripts, and documents which require security and care in handling. Other valuable historical items such as photographs, prints, postcards, memorabilia, scrapbooks, and oral histories are also held in Special Collections. In addition to archives documenting local and university history, SCUA includes distinctive collections in:

- Alternative Religions
- Comics and Graphic Arts
- History of Science
- Speculative Fiction

== Murals ==
- NRA Packages, a mural painted in 1936 by Genevieve Burgeson Bredo, and for many years thought lost, has been restored and is on display at the foot of the Library Addition stairs. The mural was discovered in 2004 behind ceiling tiles inside SDSU's Hardy Memorial Tower, which was part of the university's first library. Painted in a variety of media, it portrays three men unloading National Recovery Act (NRA) packages from a van near San Diego's Hillcrest neighborhood.
- A second, larger mural, George Sorenson's San Diego Industry, was also restored and relocated from Hardy Tower to the Library Addition. This mural depicts the successive stages of tuna fishing and canning, along with the multi-ethnic work force involved in that industry.
  - See Uncovering Local Art and Industry: The Discovery of Hidden WPA-Era Murals at San Diego State University (SDSU Occasional Archeological Paper Series)
  - See SDSU Press Release: Exhibit promises wider exposure for legendary local painter and longtime SDSU art director

== Namesake ==
Dr. Malcolm A. Love, Ph.D., was the fourth (4th) President of San Diego State University (SDSU), serving from 1952 to 1971. Prior to his Presidency, Dr. Love was President of the University of Nevada for two (2) years. During his nineteen (19) years as President of SDSU, he was able to transform the institution from a teacher's college into a university. In 1966, the Carnegie Corporation named Dr. Love one of the best college Presidents in the country. With the extraordinary growth of students, faculty and facilities, there were plans for new library to be named in honor of Dr. Love. The Library was dedicated to Dr. Love in May 1971.

See N.Y Times obituary for Dr. Malcolm A. Love, Ph.D.

== Other Libraries at San Diego State University ==
Other unofficial libraries on the SDSU campus include:

- Cross-Cultural Center Library
- Science:
  - Edwin C. Allison Center for Historical Science (Geology Library, research center, and collections)
  - Physics Library
- Business:
  - Entrepreneurial Management Center (EMC Resource Library)
- Art, Music & Dance:
  - Audio-Visual Library
  - Slide Library
- Career counseling:
  - Career Center Library
  - Career Resource Library
- Student services:
  - Test Library
- Instructional services:
  - The ITS Media Center collection has been transferred to the Library & Information Access
