= Kowloon–Canton Railway (disambiguation) =

The Kowloon–Canton Railway is a Hong Kong railway network.

Kowloon–Canton Railway may also refer to:

- Kowloon–Canton Railway (British section), now part of the East Rail line of the Hong Kong MTR system
- Kowloon–Canton Railway (Chinese section), now known as the Guangzhou–Shenzhen railway
- Kowloon-Canton Railway Corporation, former Hong Kong railway operator

== See also ==
- KCR (disambiguation)
