= Social Science Research Laboratory =

US research laboratory

Social Science Research Laboratory (SSRL)
- Established: 1974
- Location: San Diego, California, U.S.
- Campus: San Diego State University
- Website: ssrl.sdsu.edu

The Social Science Research Laboratory (SSRL) is a component of the College of Arts & Letters at San Diego State University (SDSU) in San Diego, California.

== Functions ==
The SSRL provide comprehensive survey research and program evaluation services to university faculty, administration, students, and regional government and non-profit organizations, and to provide education and training in current survey research and program evaluation methods to SDSU students. The SSRL also provides information on current best practices in survey research methodology and program evaluation to SDSU students, faculty, staff, and the greater San Diego community.

=== Standards ===
Activities are conducted in accordance with the American Association for Public Opinion Research (AAPOR) Code of Professional Ethics and Practices.

=== Affiliations ===
- AAPOR: All of SSRL’s full-time staff are members of the AAPOR.
- AEA: The SSRL staff specialize in evaluation research, and are members of the American Evaluation Association (AEA).
- CMOR: The SSRL is a member of the Council on Marketing and Opinion Research (CMOR).
- EMPAQ: The SSRL is a certified independent data collection contractor for Employer Measures of Production, Absence, and Quality (EMPAQ).

== See also ==
- Statistical survey
