= The Daily Aztec =

San Diego State University student newspaper

- Type: Student newspaper
- Format: Tabloid
- School: San Diego State University
- Founded: 1913
- Headquarters: San Diego, California, U.S.
- Circulation: 10,000
- Website: thedailyaztec.com

The Daily Aztec is a not-for-profit, independent student newspaper serving San Diego State University (SDSU) and the surrounding College Area in San Diego, California. It was established in 1913. It is named for the Aztecs identity of the university.

The Daily Aztec publishes on a regular basis when the university is in session (excluding holidays). It serves a student population of over 35,000 and a faculty and staff population of over 4,000.

== History ==
In the fall of 1913, the student body of the then-San Diego Normal School voted to begin publishing a four (4) page weekly campus newspaper. The first edition premiered Nov. 26, 1913, as a four-page tabloid, under the name of the Normal News Weekly. In 1921, the paper was renamed the Paper Lantern. In 1960, the paper shifted to daily publication, becoming The Daily Aztec. Over the years the publication's frequency varied; as of fall 2013, it appears twice a week. In 2017, the organization received a first place award for best college newspaper, from the San Diego Society of Professional Journalists. Several staff members also received individual awards.

A former editor in chief, Dave Hasemeyer (1978–79), went on to win a Pulitzer Prize in 2013 while working for Inside Climate News.

== Structure ==
Although previously connected with the SDSU journalism department, The Daily Aztec is now a program of Associated Students of San Diego State University. The paper is student-run and independent, but overseen by the Student Media Advisory Committee (SMAC). SMAC is composed of students, faculty and staff from SDSU and has both permanent and annual members; SMAC hires the editor in chief, approves the paper's budgets, and is responsible for ensuring that paper follows approved advertising and editorial policies.
