= San Diego State University College of Health & Human Services =

Coordinates: 32°46′35″N 117°4′19″W

San Diego State University College of Health and Human Services
- Type: Academic Division
- Dean: Amy Bonomi
- Location: San Diego, California, United States
- Website: Official website

The San Diego State University College of Health and Human Services is a college at San Diego State University (SDSU) that offers students academic study, field placement, clinical experiences, and research opportunities. The college offers professional education in the health and human service disciplines. The college consists of the following group of professional schools, and departments: the School of Speech, Language, and Hearing Sciences, the School of Nursing, the School of Social Work, the Department of Gerontology, and the Graduate School of Public Health.

== Academics ==
- college homepage

=== Degrees ===
- Bachelor of Arts (B.A.)
- Bachelor of Sciences (B.S.)
- Master of Arts (M.A.)
- Master of Public Health (M.P.H.)
- Master of Science (M.S.)
- Master of Social Work (M.S.W.)
- Doctor of Audiology (Au.D.)
- Doctor of Philosophy (Ph.D.)

==== Special Degrees ====
- Master of Social Work (M.S.W.) and Juris Doctor (J.D.) Joint Degree

(Offered in conjunction with California Western School of Law)
Joint MSW-JD home page

=== Departments ===
The College of Health and Human Services includes several schools and academic departments:

See Department Summary and Index

- School of Speech, Language, and Hearing Sciences
- Gerontology
- Health Science (Community Health Education)
- Nursing

School of Nursing

- Public Health

Graduate School of Public Health

- Social Work

School of Social Work

(Note that Pre-Professional Studies in medicine, veterinary medicine, and dentistry are offered by SDSU's College of Sciences.)

==== Institutes/Research Centers ====
- Heart Institute
- Center for Alcohol and Other Drug Studies and Services
- Social Policy Institute
- Consensus Organizing Center
- Institute for Nursing Research
- San Diego Prevention Research Center
- Institute for Public Health
- Center for Behavioral and Community Health Studies
- Center for Behavioral Epidemiology and Community Health
- Center for Injury Prevention Policy and Practice
- Communications Clinic for Speech, Language, Hearing Disorders and Deafness
- University Center on Aging
- Center for Injury Prevention and Research

== See also ==
- San Diego State University
