= Graduate School of Public Health, San Diego State University =

Coordinates: 32°46′38.56″N 117°4′19.14″W

- Type: Public
- Established: 1980
- Dean: Carleen H. Stoskopf
- Location: San Diego, California, U.S.
- Campus: Urban
- Website: publichealth.sdsu.edu

Hepner Hall with Hardy Memorial Tower in the background

The Graduate School of Public Health is one of the professional graduate schools of San Diego State University (SDSU) within its College of Health and Human Services. Located in the College Area neighborhood of San Diego, California, it is part of the Association of Schools of Public Health and is fully accredited by the Council on Education for Public Health.

SDSU is a member of the Western Association of Graduate Schools, the Council of Graduate Schools, and the Consortium of Universities for Global Health. The GSPH also maintains its own chapter in the Delta Omega Honorary Society in Public Health.

The school's mission is "to improve population health and well-being by building a diverse public health workforce to meet the needs of current and future communities."

== History ==
The GSPH began through the efforts of James W. Cobble, Dean of the Graduate Division at SDSU; the late Dr. John J. Hanlon, former Assistant Surgeon General of the U.S. Public Health Service and a father of modern public health; and Thomas B. Day, former President of SDSU. Associated with Dr. Hanlon's early work on the GSPH is the formation of an umbrella organization, the College of Health and Human Services, which would provide collaboration between the GSPH, the Schools of Social Work and Nursing, and the Departments of Health Science and Communicative Disorders.

== Degrees ==
The GSPH offers an undergraduate minor in public health; a Bachelor of Science in Health Sciences; a Master of Public Health; a Preventative Medicine Residency program; and Ph.D.s in Epidemiology, Health Behavior, and Global Health. Ph.D.s awarded by the GSPH are jointly awarded with the University of California, San Diego. The GSPH offers the following dual degrees: MPH/MA in Latin American Studies, MPH/MSW, and MPH/MD. Students pursuing MPH degrees have the option of choosing between five concentrations: Biometry, Environmental Health, Epidemiology, Health Promotion and Behavioral Science, and Health Management and Policy. The GSPH is among only five schools in the United States whose MPH concentration in Management and Policy is accredited by the Commission on the Accreditation of Healthcare Management Education in addition to being accredited by CEPH.

== Affiliated research institutions ==
- Heart Institute
- San Diego Prevention Research Center
- Institute for Public Health
- Institute for Behavioral and Community Health
- Center for Behavioral Epidemiology and Community Health
- Center for Injury Prevention Policy and Practice
