= KCR (San Diego State University) =

- San Diego, California; United States
- Broadcast area: SDSU local campus community, cable & internet
- Frequency: 1610 AM

Programming
- Format: College radio

Ownership
- Owner: San Diego State University

History
- First air date: 1969

Technical information
- Transmitter coordinates: 32°46′25″N 117°4′10″W

Links
- Webcast: Listen Live
- Website: KCR College Radio

KCR College Radio is an American online radio station. Located on the campus of San Diego State University (SDSU), it was established in 1969 as a student-run alternative to the educational radio station that would become KPBS.

== History ==
KCR is the second radio station affiliated with SDSU. In 1960, KEBS-FM was licensed to a California State University campus. KEBS broadcast mostly classical music and educational content a few hours a day and was operated only by students earning credit for courses in the Radio-TV curriculum.

In 1966, Martin Gienke did a feasibility study on setting up a separate volunteer college radio station for his senior project. In 1968, Jerry Zullo, who helped with the feasibility study was charged by KEBS founder Ken Jones with establishing the student-run station "as soon as possible." The signal was broadcast into dormitories using carrier current transmitters and could be picked up several blocks away from campus. The first meeting of the student club "Aztec Broadcasters" drew approximately 500 interested students.

In continuous operation since 1969, KCR's original broadcasts took place over cable systems. This was followed by Carrier Current AM on AM 550 in the Dorms on campus and in the campus area on the hard wired PA systems in the cafeterias and Aztec Center, as well as later analog FM band transmission, before it started broadcasting by way of 1610 AM in the college community area.

In the 1970s, an early slogan was "If you hear it on commercial radio stations, you won't hear it here."

In 2010, the studio moved from the Aztec Student Union building to the Communications building, followed by a student led push to reinstitute the freeform content around the clock in broadcast and digital in 2011 by Joshua Hoffman and Levi Jenkins, securing local ad sponsorship revenue and resonating with the student body.

In an effort to give SDSU students a chance to practice interviewing and production skills, KCR started a YouTube and SoundCloud series called "Secret Sessions" in Fall 2013. Secret Sessions premiered with an interview and acoustic performances by indie folk band Dresses, followed by a session with local San Diego band Uncle Jesse.

== Programming ==
In 2013, KCR moved its programming away from free-form. KCR's current mission is to be the "Sound of State," student designed programming for the SDSU community. Another part of KCR's mission is to provide opportunities for students to share their creativity, explore a career path, and gain broadcast and technical skills. All content is created by and broadcast by students (and some alumni). The station still has free-form shows, called Aztec Originals, where students are allowed to broadcast whatever content they want. Structured talk shows include The KCR Morning Show, #stateproblems, Talkin' Aztec Sports, and Talkin' National Sports.

KCR broadcasts live coverage of SDSU Ice Hockey and Baseball games. KCR talk show hosts have also covered student political events live from the field, such as a student moderated open-forum on the CSU "Student Success Fee," and 2013 A.S. presidential candidate Gabriel Torres' open forum. Music DJs broadcast live from University Towers Kitchen on Friday nights.

As of 2021, KCR can be listened to through the TuneIn app, in residence halls and by subscribers of Cox Digital Cable.

== Accolades ==
In March 2015, KCR won three Golden Microphone awards at the Intercollegiate Broadcasting System for Best Online College Radio Station, Best Play-by-Play and Best Campus News Coverage. In April 2015, the San Diego County Board of Supervisors and the San Diego City Council each presented the station with proclamations declaring KCR College Radio Day.
