= San Diego State University Fowler College of Business =

School at San Diego State University

Coordinates: 32°46′31″N 117°04′20″W

- Type: Public
- Established: 1955
- Dean: Dan Moshavi
- Academic staff: 92 tenure/tenure-track 130 lecturers
- Students: 9,300 (2024)
- Undergraduates: 8,700 (2024)
- Postgraduates: 600
- Location: San Diego, California, U.S.
- Campus: Urban
- Website: business.sdsu.edu

The Fowler College of Business is the business school of San Diego State University (SDSU), a public research university in San Diego, California.

== History ==
The Fowler College of Business was established as the College of Business Administration at what was then San Diego State College in 1955. The college was accredited by the Association to Advance Collegiate Schools of Business (AACSB) in 1959 and was one of the first in the California State University system to earn this distinction.

Charles W. Lamden served as the college’s first dean and, in 2008, the Charles W. Lamden School of Accountancy was named to honor his legacy. Over the years, the college grew to include majors in accounting, general business, finance, financial services, management, management information systems, marketing, and real estate.

The college also offers the MBA and five specialized master’s degree programs (Accountancy, Information Systems, Financial & Tax Planning, Global Business Development, and Cybersecurity Management).

On October 26, 2016 the university announced that the college would be named the Fowler College of Business in honor of Ron Fowler, co-owner and executive chairman of the San Diego Padres, and his wife Alexis, who is a graduate of the university's Charles W. Lamden School of Accountancy. The couple had pledged a $25 million endowment to the college - the largest gift in the university's 119-year history.

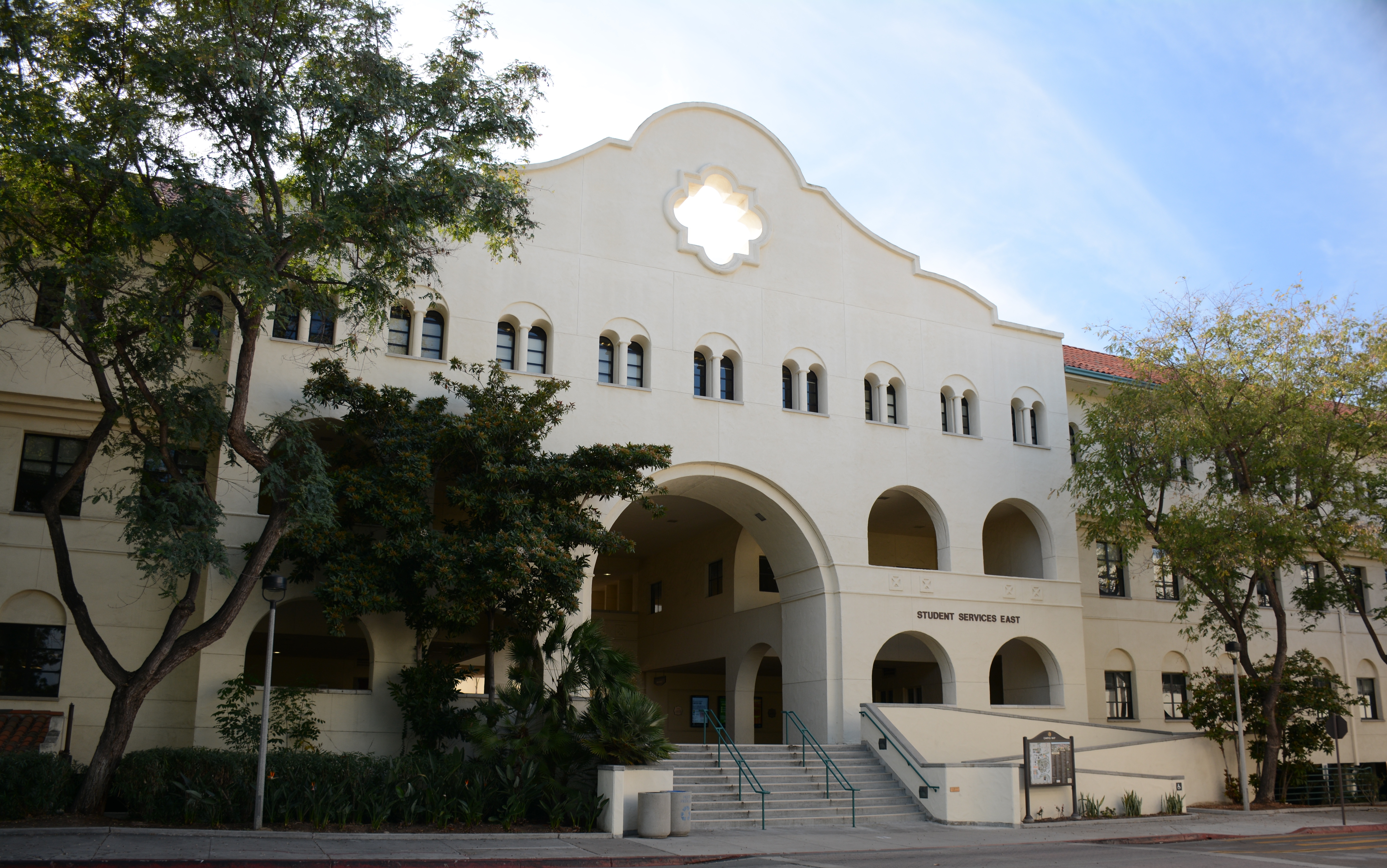
Fowler College of Business building

== Notable alumni ==
- Bud Black ('79, management), former Major League Baseball player and manager
- Will Demps ('01, information systems), former NFL player
- Kabeer Gbaja-Biamila ('00, management), former NFL, player
- Doug Manchester ('65, finance), chairman, the Manchester Group
- Linda Lang ('91, finance MBA), former CEO and president of Jack in the Box
- S. Donley Ritchey (accounting 1955, management M.S. 1963), former CEO and president of Lucky Stores and current director of the McClatchy Company

== See also ==
- List of business schools in the United States
