= Aztec Student Union =

Coordinates: 32°46′25.53″N 117°04′12.02″W

San Diego State University Aztec Student Union
- Interactive map of the San Diego State University; Aztec Student Union area
- Former names: Aztec Center (1960-2011)

General information
- Type: Student union
- Location: San Diego, California
- Completed: 1968
- Renovated: 2013

Design and construction
- Architecture firm: CannonDesign

Other information
- Parking: yes

Website
- http://aztecstudentunion.com/

The Aztec Student Union is a student union on the campus of San Diego State University (SDSU). It was known as the Aztec Center from 1968 to 2011, when it was demolished for the Aztec Student Union. It leads into the heart of the SDSU campus and is located near many classrooms and administrative services.

== Aztec Center ==
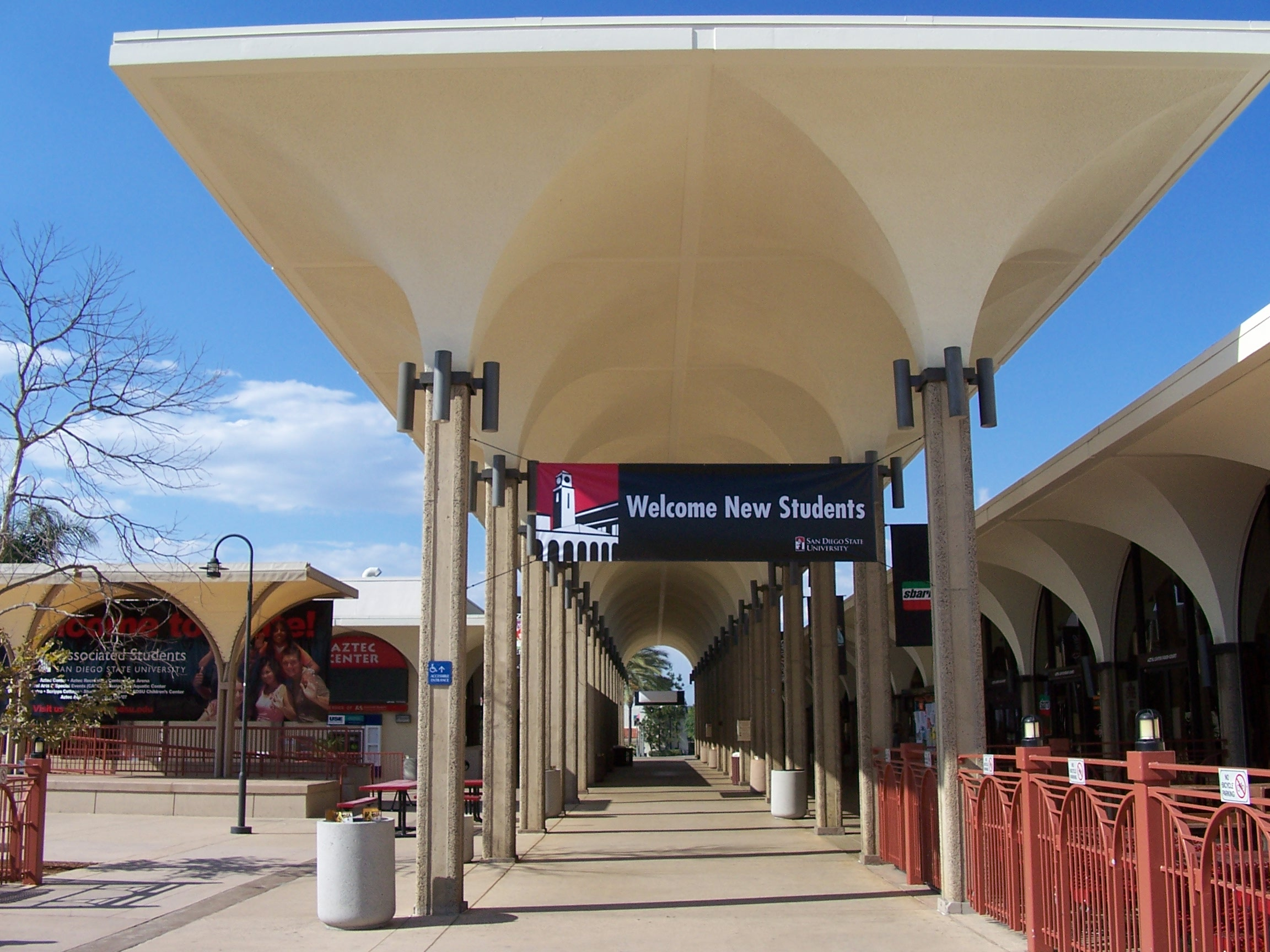
Aztec Center

The Aztec Center, planned in the late 1950s and built in the early 1960s, was the first permanent student union in the California State University system. It offered a variety of services, places, and spaces geared to the needs of students including restaurants, movie theater, meeting rooms, and various student organizations. It was also home to the Associated Students' Government & Business Office, Council Chambers, the Government Affairs Office and Meeting Services. Many student organizations also housed their offices in the Aztec Center.

== See also ==
- Student activity center
