= San Diego State University =

Public research university in California, US

- Former names: San Diego Normal School (1897–1923); San Diego State Teachers College (1923–1935); San Diego State College (1935–1972); California State University, San Diego (1972–1974)
- Motto: "Leadership Starts Here"
- Type: Public research university
- Established: March 13, 1897; 129 years ago
- Parent institution: California State University
- Accreditation: WSCUC
- Academic affiliations: Space-grant; CUIBE
- Endowment: $456.6 million (2023–24)
- Budget: $1.43 billion (2024–25)
- President: Adela de la Torre
- Provost: William Tong
- Faculty: 2,171 (fall 2024)
- Total staff: 4,329 (fall 2024)
- Students: 38,369 (fall 2024)
- Undergraduates: 33,839 (fall 2024)
- Postgraduates: 4,557 (fall 2024)
- Location: San Diego, California, United States; 32°46′31″N 117°04′20″W
- Campus: 280 acres (113.3 ha); Large city
- Newspaper: The Daily Aztec
- Colors: Red and black
- Nickname: Aztecs
- Sporting affiliations: NCAA Division I FBS – Pac-12
- Mascot: Aztec warrior
- Website: sdsu.edu
- San Diego State College
- U.S. National Register of Historic Places
- U.S. Historic district
- California Historical Landmark
- Location: 5500 Campanile Drive, San Diego, California
- Area: 283 acres (114.5 ha)
- Architectural style: Mission/Spanish Revival
- NRHP reference No.: 97000924
- CHISL No.: 798

Significant dates
- Added to NRHP: September 4, 1997
- Designated CHISL: 1964

San Diego State University (SDSU) is a public research university in San Diego, California, United States. Founded in 1897, it is the third-oldest university and southernmost in the 23-member California State University (CSU) system. SDSU is the oldest higher education institution in San Diego; its academic roots were established as a normal school in University Heights, then known as the San Diego Normal School. In the fall of 2025, the university enrolled a record 41,184 students.

SDSU comprises eight colleges and offers over 200 degree programs at the undergraduate and graduate levels. It is accredited by the WASC Senior College and University Commission (WSCUC). The university is classified among "R1: Doctoral Universities – Very high research activity". It is a federally-designated Hispanic-Serving Institution (HSI) and an Asian American and Native American Pacific Islander-Serving Institution (AANAPISI).

SDSU's athletic teams compete as the San Diego State Aztecs; the Aztecs nickname was chosen by students in 1925. They compete in National Collegiate Athletic Association (NCAA) Division I as a member of the Pac-12 Conference. SDSU currently fields varsity teams across 17 NCAA-sanctioned sports. As of 2021, athletes from the university had won 14 medals at the Olympic Games.

== History ==
Established on March 13, 1897, San Diego State University first began as the "San Diego Normal School", and was initially meant to educate local women as elementary school teachers. It was located on a 17-acre (6.9 ha) campus on Park Boulevard in University Heights (now the headquarters of San Diego Unified School District). It opened with 7 faculty members and 91 students; at first, the curriculum was limited to English, history and mathematics. In 1923, the San Diego Normal School became "San Diego State Teachers College", "a four-year public institution controlled by the California State Board of Education."

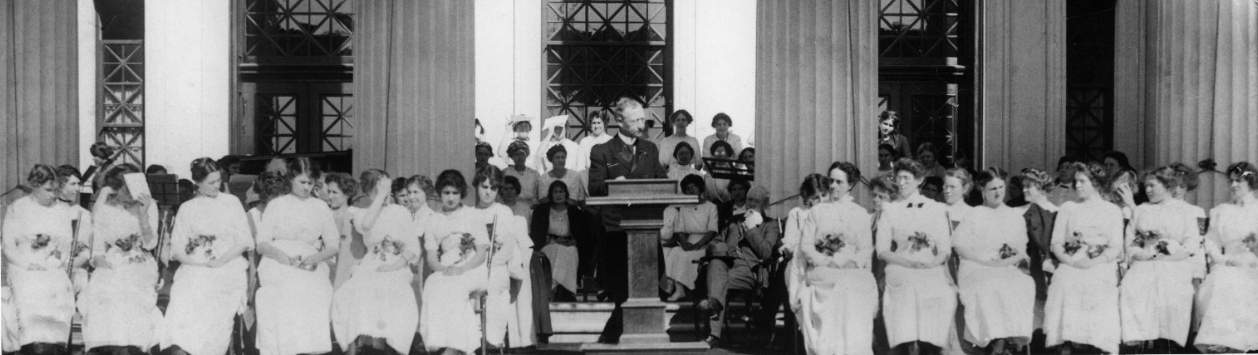
The first graduating class of the opening year of the newly constructed San Diego Normal School, 1899

By the 1930s the school had outgrown its original campus. In 1931 it moved to its current location on Montezuma Mesa at what was then the eastern edge of San Diego. In 1935, the school expanded its offerings beyond teacher education and became "San Diego State College". In 1960, San Diego State College became a part of the California State Colleges system, now known as the California State University. In 1972, San Diego State College became "California State University, San Diego", and finally, in 1974, San Diego State University (SDSU).

John F. Kennedy, then the president of the United States, gave the graduation commencement address at the then-San Diego State College on June 6, 1963. Kennedy was given an honorary doctorate degree in law at the ceremony, making SDSC the first California State College to award an honorary doctorate. In 1964, the event was registered as California Historical Landmark #798.

On May 29, 1964, civil rights leader Martin Luther King Jr. addressed a near-capacity audience in the Open Air Theater. King discussed his vision for the future and called for the passage of the Civil Rights Act of 1964, then being debated in the Senate.

On August 15, 1996, there was a shooting that occurred at the engineering building. Three professors were killed by master's degree student Frederick Martin Davidson. Three months later, a copycat threat flier was sent, with threats against professors and racial insults.

In April 2012, the 14th Dalai Lama spoke at SDSU's Viejas Arena as part of his "Compassion Without Borders" tour.

After the departure of the San Diego Chargers for Los Angeles in 2017, SDSU endeavored to gain control of San Diego Stadium (then called Qualcomm Stadium) and surrounding city property. The stadium hosted the San Diego State Aztecs football team, connected to the SDSU main campus by SDSU Transit Center. The proposal, called SDSU West, was put to city voters in November 2017 where it won approval by 54%, beating out a competing commercial proposal called SoccerCity. Negotiations began for SDSU to purchase the property from the city of San Diego. On May 29, 2020, the city council gave conceptual approval to sell 135 acres, including the stadium, to SDSU for $88 million.

SDSU broke ground for a new 35,000-seat stadium in August 2020. The stadium, which opened in September 2022 as Snapdragon Stadium, hosts SDSU football games and various concerts and events. Snapdragon Stadium is also the home of San Diego FC of Major League Soccer (MLS) and San Diego Wave FC of the National Women's Soccer League (NWSL). The entire $3.5 billion project, now known as SDSU Mission Valley, includes housing, office and retail space, hotels, and 80 acres (32 ha) of parks and open space, including a 34-acre (14 ha) river park on city property; it will be rolled out in phases over 15 years.

=== University presidents ===
SDSU has had eleven presidents, two of whom served in an acting capacity. Several structures on the campus are named in past presidents' honor, such as Hardy Memorial Tower, Hepner Hall (integrated in the university's logo), and Malcolm A. Love Library. In March 2017 President Hirshman announced his resignation for June 30, 2017; he subsequently became the seventh president of Stevenson University in Maryland in July 2017. Sally Roush was the interim president until January 31, 2018. On that date, the CSU Board of Trustees appointed Adela de la Torre to serve as the permanent President. De la Torre is the first woman to serve in the role on a permanent basis.

The following persons had served as president of San Diego State University:

No.	Image	President	Start	End	Notes
1		Samuel T. Black	October 1, 1898	September 8, 1910	
2		Edward L. Hardy	September 9, 1910	August 31, 1935	
3		Walter R. Hepner	September 1, 1935	August 31, 1952	
4		Malcolm Love	September 1, 1952	September 1971	
acting		Donald E. Walker	September 1971	June 30, 1972	
5		Brage Golding	July 1, 1972	August 31, 1977	
acting		Trevor Colbourn	September 1, 1977	July 1, 1978	
6		Thomas B. Day	July 5, 1978	July 4, 1996	
7		Stephen L. Weber	July 5, 1996	July 4, 2011	
8		Elliot Hirshman	July 5, 2011	June 30, 2017	
acting		Sally Roush	July 1, 2017	June 27, 2018	
9		Adela de la Torre	June 28, 2018	present	

== Campus ==
Several buildings are listed on the National Register of Historic Places:

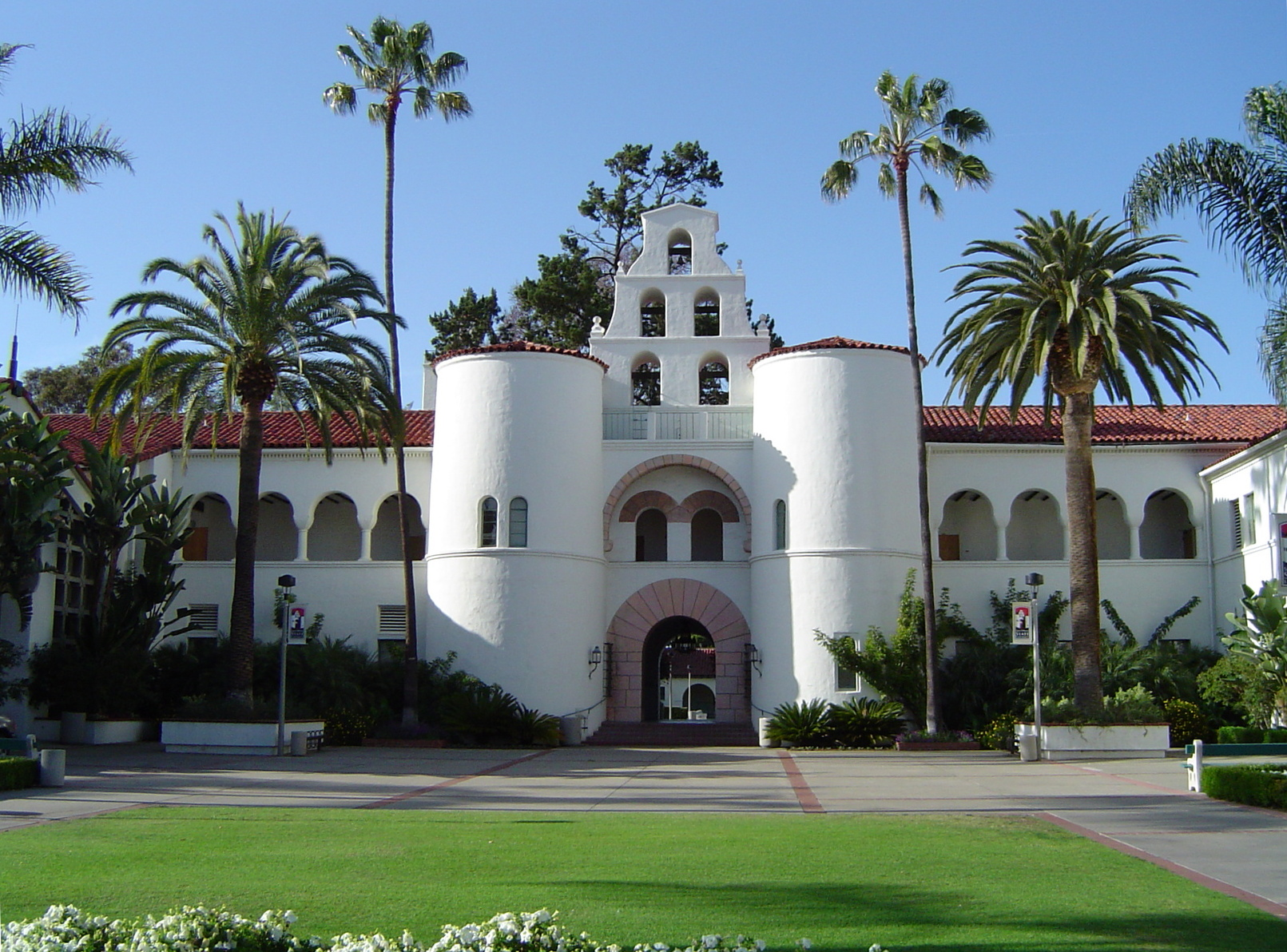
A landmark building (Hepner Hall) featured in the school's logo

- Scripps Cottage was finished in September 1931, funded with a donation of $6,000 from Ellen Browning Scripps matched with $5,000 from the state. It was the headquarters for the Associated Women Students and was used for meetings, women's activities, and served as a lounge. On September 3, 1968, the building was moved to make room for the new school. It was used mainly as a conference and meeting building, and in 1993, began serving as a center for international students.
- The area next to Scripps Cottage is home to a campus famous turtle pond. While this pond is colloquially known among students as the turtle pond, the university actually intended it to be a Koi Pond only, and the turtles are unwelcome guests left abandoned by previous owners.
- Aztec Bowl, costing $500,000 to construct, was dedicated on October 3, 1936, before 7,500 people. The stadium was initially supposed to be expanded to 45,000 seats, but instead was only expanded once with 5,000 seats in 1948.
- Viejas Arena (originally known as Cox Arena) was constructed over part of Aztec Bowl, opening in July 1997.
- The CalCoast Credit Union Open Air Theatre (formerly The Greek Bowl and the Open Air Theatre) was financed by the Works Progress Administration and the state for $200,000 and originally dedicated on May 3, 1941.
- Hepner Hall took on its current name on January 19, 1976, when the Montezuma Mesa building was renamed to honor Walter R. Hepner Hall. On May 1, 1977, the Humanities building was named after John Adams, a professor, administrator, and archivist. The Humanities-Social Sciences building was renamed in 1986 after geographer Alvena Storm and historian Abraham P. Nasatir.
- Peterson Gymnasium was finished in 1961.
- Hardy Memorial Tower, in the Mission Revival style, resembles a Spanish bell tower and is one of the most recognizable buildings on campus. The building housed the university's first library, which featured murals painted by the Works Progress Administration.
- The WPA Mission Revival Communications building, Exercise and Nutritional Sciences building, Faculty-Staff Club, Life Sciences building and Annex, Little Theatre, Physical Plant Boiler Shop, and the Physical Science building are also listed on the National Register.

Other buildings on campus include:

- Malcolm A. Love Library acquired its 100,000th book on May 21, 1944. By the end of World War II it was adding about 8,000 books a year. In 1959, a 40,000 sq ft (3,700 m^{2}). addition to the library was finished, but it was already deemed too small. In 1952, the library had 125,000 books, and state regulations required that old books be eliminated before new ones could be added. By 1965, there were more than 300,000 books housed in a library that could hold 230,000. This was ranked highest in state colleges in terms of library size. In the 1960s, construction of a new library began, which required the relocation of Scripps Cottage. The $8 million building was designed with 300,000 sq ft (28,000 m^{2}). of space to accommodate one million books. In February 1971, the library opened, housing 700,000 books, and was named after President Malcolm A. Love for his popularity on campus and his role in bringing State to university status. Governor Ronald Reagan said the library would "... serve as a lasting memorial to the man who led the college through its growing pains ... to one of the finest state colleges in California". The building was five stories high and was the largest building on campus. A four-story kinetic (and sound) sculpture entitled "Hanging Discus" by sculptor George Baker was specifically designed for the library and added to the interior staircase in November 1973.
- The Conrad Prebys Aztec Student Union (formerly Aztec Center) secured financing in 2010 and was completed in March 2014, replacing and approximately doubling in size from its former structure. The facility is the first student union in the United States to qualify for LEED Platinum distinction.
- The Parma Payne Goodall Alumni Center opened in October 2009, costing $11 million, and is home to the SDSU Alumni Association and the Campanile Foundation.
- Storm and Nasatir Halls opened in 2014. Originally built in 1957, the 137,700 square foot complex received a complete makeover to house eight academic departments from the College of Arts & Letters, newly upgraded classrooms, faculty offices, research facilities, two large lecture halls, and a food service facility. Total cost for the construction neared $74 million, began in 2012, and was completed in 2014. Included in the opening were two new named facilities: Charles Hostler Hall (a 435-seat lecture auditorium) and the J. Keith Behner and Catherine M. Stiefel Auditorium (a 252-seat lecture hall). Storm Hall was named in honor of geography department professor Alvena Storm, who served as department chair, and on the faculty for over 40 years since 1926. Nasatir Hall was named for Abraham P. Nasatir, a professor emeritus of history who taught at SDSU for 46 years (1928–74) and was later internationally recognized for his research on California history, receiving four Fulbright Fellowships.

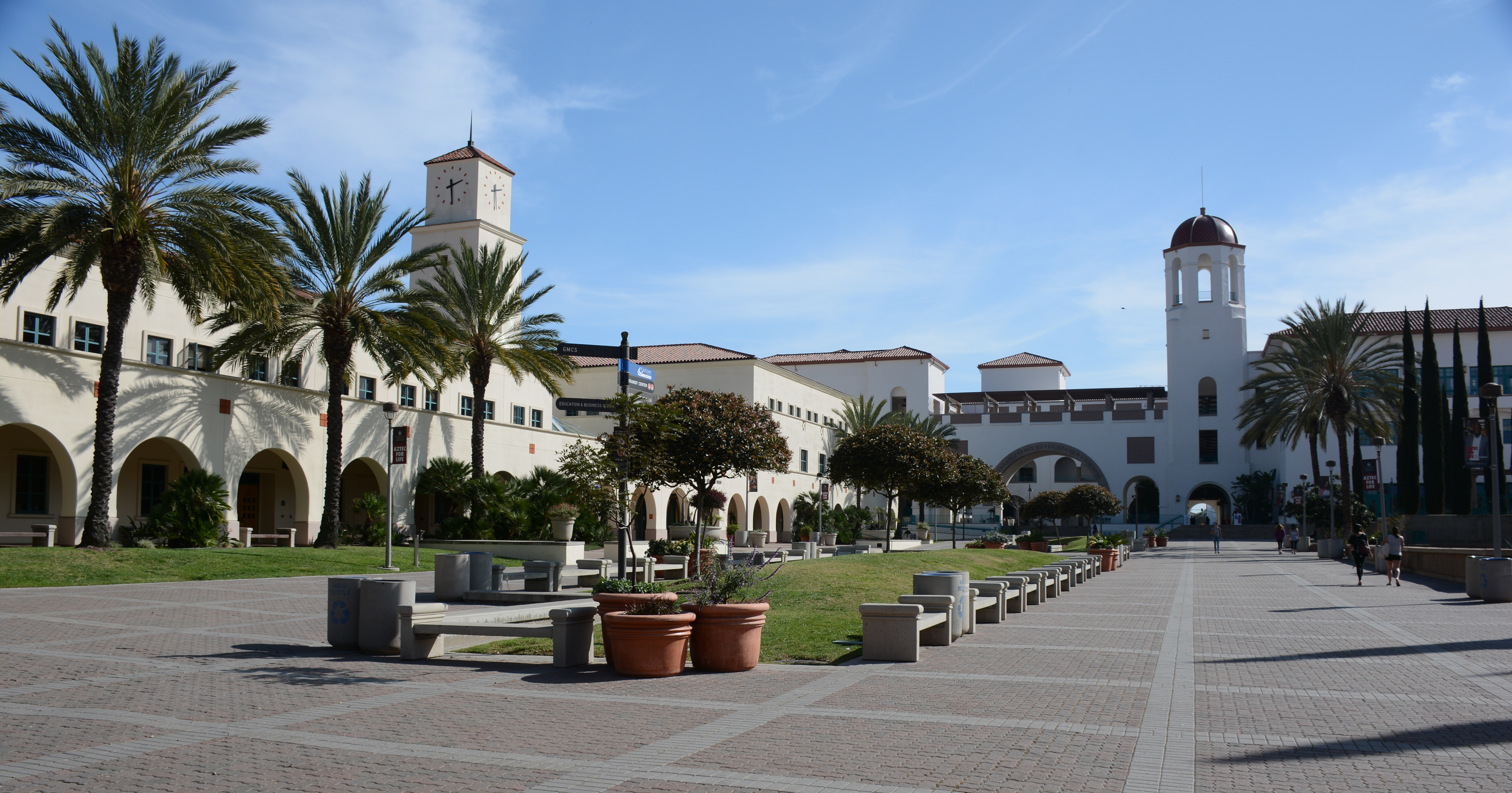
Conrad Prebys Aztec Student Union

=== Residence halls ===
In 1937, Quetzal Hall, the first dormitory, opened for 40 women students and was located off campus. In 1968, the coed dorm Zura Hall was built, and more rooms were added later. Chapultepec Hall held 580 students when first built.

Today, the university owns and operates housing for over 7,600 students in residence halls and student apartments, fraternity row, and language and honors housing. There are 22 dorm buildings located on campus.

Approximately 70 percent of first-time freshmen live in on-campus housing, while about 24 percent of the overall undergraduate student body resides in on-campus housing. SDSU offers themed living communities in the freshman and upperclassman housing, such as "pathways for transfers", "gender-neutral housing", and "explore San Diego".

=== Off-campus facilities ===
==== Mount Laguna Observatory ====
Since 1968, SDSU's Astronomy Department has owned Mount Laguna Observatory located in the Cleveland National Forest.

==== Biological field stations ====
- Operated by the SDSU College of Sciences:
  - Santa Margarita Ecological Reserve
  - Sky Oaks Field Station
  - Fortuna Mountain Research Reserve
  - Tijuana River National Estuarine Research Reserve

==== Coastal and Marine Institute Laboratory (CMIL) ====
The Coastal and Marine Institute Laboratory (CMIL), formerly known as the Coastal Waters Laboratory, is an academic laboratory operated by the SDSU College of Sciences as part of the Coastal Marine Institute. It is located on a coastal site on the grounds of the old San Diego Naval Training Center (now part of Liberty Station).

==== One Water Living Learning Laboratory (OWLLL) ====
Scheduled to open in 2026 on the Mission Valley Campus, the One Water Living Learning Laboratory (OWLLL) serves as a workforce training facility and outreach center, addressing water quality, stormwater treatment, and water reuse with innovative technologies.

=== Branch campuses ===
==== SDSU Imperial Valley ====
SDSU operates a branch campus, Imperial Valley Campus (SDSU Imperial Valley) located in Calexico, California, with an additional campus in Brawley, California. SDSU Imperial Valley includes a research park and related facilities. The campus originally served only upper division, teacher certification, and graduate students but now serves a selective cohort of freshmen and sophomores pursuing degrees in criminal justice, liberal studies, or psychology.

==== SDSU Georgia ====
SDSU Georgia is a branch campus located in Tbilisi, Georgia, in the former Soviet Republic of Georgia. SDSU Georgia is run in conjunction with three Georgian universities: Georgian Technical University (GTU), Ilia State University (ISU), and Tbilisi State University (TSU). The SDSU-Georgia branch campus is offering courses leading to science, technology, engineering, and mathematics (STEM) bachelor's degrees.

==== Former branch campus locations ====
SDSU formerly operated a campus in North County, which was later converted into California State University San Marcos. In the South Bay, SDSU operated a campus in National City, California. This campus shared facilities with Southwestern College. The South Bay Campus is now closed indefinitely.

== Academics and student body ==
Undergraduate admission statistics
	Fall 2025	Fall 2024	Fall 2023	Fall 2022	Fall 2021
First-time Freshmen
Applicants	95,444	90,509	83,274	77,250	67,660
Admits	35,709	32,561	28,517	30,331	25,646
Admit rate	37%	36%	34%	39%	38%
Enrolled	6,911	6,634	6,245	6,573	5,269
Yield rate	19%	20%	22%	22%	21%
Transfers
Applicants	17,595	17,337	17,572	23,594	25,677
Admits	9,761	9,378	10,383	8,733	7,631
Admit rate	55%	54%	59%	37%	30%
Enrolled	4,819	4,637	5,238	4,273	4,038
Yield rate	49%	49%	50%	49%	53%

The university awards 190 bachelor's degrees, 91 master's degrees, and 30 doctoral degrees, including EdD, DPT, JD, AuD, DNP, and PhD programs in collaboration with other universities. SDSU also offers 26 different teaching credentials. The university offers more doctoral degrees than any other campus in the entire California State University, while also enrolling the largest student body of doctoral students in the system. In 2015, SDSU enrolled the most doctoral students in its entire history.

San Diego State University is consistently one of the most applied-to universities in the United States, receiving over 90,000 undergraduate applications (including transfer and first time freshman) for the fall 2024 semester and accepting over 32,000 for an admission rate of 35.8 percent across the university,

In Fall 2022, SDSU hit an all-time high enrollment record student body of nearly 37,000 and an alumni base of more than 400,000.

San Diego State University is a Hispanic-serving institution and an Asian American Native American Pacific Islander serving institution (AANAPISI).

Undergraduate demographics as of Fall 2023
Race and ethnicity	Total
Hispanic	36%
White	34%
Asian	13%
Two or more races	7%
Black	4%
Unknown	3%
Foreign national	2%
Economic diversity
Low-income (Note: The percentage of students who received an income-based federal Pell grant intended for low-income students.)	32%
Affluent (Note: The percentage of students who are a part of the American middle class at the bare minimum.)	68%

The university's 1987 student body of 35,945 FTES (Full-Time Equivalent Students) made it at the time the largest university in California and the tenth largest university in the United States. Due to the overwhelming number of students and lack of facilities and majors, The California State University Board of Trustees voted to cap enrollment for SDSU at 33,000. However, in 1993 enrollment dropped to 26,800 (the lowest since 1973) due to a financial crisis. Nonetheless, enrollment has fluctuated through the years and rose back to nearly 35,000 (exceeding the cap) in 2008. For the fall 2016 semester, the university had a total enrollment of 33,778 students – approximately 29,046 undergraduate and 4,732 postgraduate – making it one of the largest research universities in the state of California. In fall 2013, SDSU had the most doctoral students enrolled in its history at 534 students, also the highest number of doctorate-seeking students enrolled across the 23-campus CSU system.

== Rankings and reputation ==
Academic rankings

National
- Forbes: 77
- U.S. News & World Report: 137
- Washington Monthly: 99
- WSJ/College Pulse: 251

Global
- ARWU: 601-700
- QS: 1001–1200
- THE: 1001-1200
- U.S. News & World Report: 708

2024-2025 USNWR Best Regional Colleges West Rankings
Top Performers on Social Mobility	92
Top Public Schools	52
Best College for Veterans	70
Best Value School	162
Nursing	96
Economics	114
Best Undergraduate Engineering Programs	98 (At schools whose highest degree is a doctorate)

2025 USNWR Graduate School Rankings
Program	Ranking
Rehabilitation Counseling	7
Speech–Language Pathology	11
Audiology	23
Clinical Psychology	27
Public health	27
Education	45
Physical Therapy	50
Social Work	51
Part-time MBA	52
Public Affairs	72
Psychology	81
Fine Arts	89
Earth Sciences	98
Chemistry	108
Biological Sciences	119
Mathematics	133
Engineering	173

Top 10 foreign countries in headcount (Fall 2025)
Country	Headcount
India	268
Japan	72
China	68
Vietnam	67
Mexico	59
Canada	34
Germany	34
Brazil	32
South Korea	31
Turkey	30

San Diego State University ranked 231st in the U.S. for in-state students in PayScale's 2024 "Best Value Colleges", which ranked 1,978 colleges and universities for return on investment (ROI). According to PayScale's projections, SDSU has a 20-year net return on investment of $540,000 for an in-state student.

Money magazine ranked SDSU 79th in the country out of 739 schools evaluated for its 2020 "Best Colleges for Your Money" edition. In 2024, Washington Monthly ranked SDSU 99th among 438 national universities in the U.S. based on Montclair State's contribution to the public good, as measured by social mobility, research, and promoting public service.

U.S. News & World Report 2025 rankings: SDSU is tied for 117th overall among 436 national universities, tied for 57th among 225 "Top Public Schools", tied for 78th out of 174 "Best Colleges for Veterans", and 172nd out of 207 "Best Value Schools" among national universities in the U.S. The College of Engineering's undergraduate program ranks tied for 96th out of 210 schools whose highest engineering degree offered is a doctorate.

The Academic Ranking of World Universities ranked San Diego State University as one of the top 200 world universities for Economics/Business (between 151 and 200).

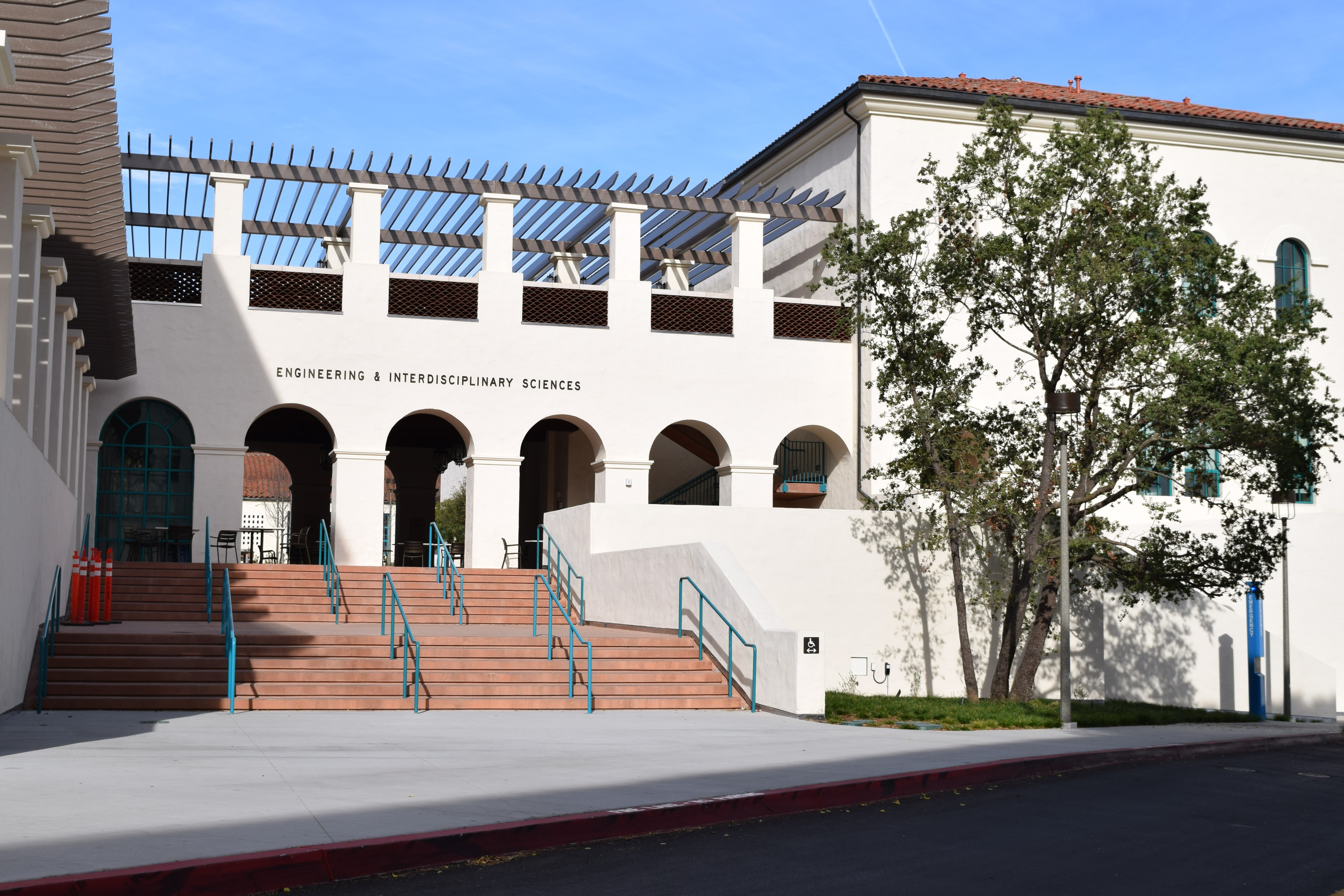
Engineering & Interdisciplinary Science Building

In graduate school rankings, QS Global 200 Business Schools Report ranks SDSU's business college the 80th best in all of North America. Bloomberg Businessweek ranked SDSU as #84 among business colleges in the United States. As there are 1656 schools offering business degree programs in the U.S. (529 of which are accredited by AACSB, the bulk of the others by ACBSP), these rankings would put SDSU in the top 5% of American business schools (or the top 15% of American AACSB schools). Its MBA program is also ranked by QS as between the 151st and 200th best in the world.

The Center For World University Rankings ranks San Diego State University as #376 globally and #126 nationally as of 2017. The CWUR rankings place emphasis on alumni employment and quality of teaching, rather than being purely research-based like ARWU's.

SDSU is also a top producer of U.S. Fulbright Scholars, the U.S. government's flagship international educational exchange program. SDSU has had more than 65 students receive Fulbright Scholarships since 2005. The university ranks No. 30 as the nation's best universities for veterans, according to Military Times Edge. SDSU ranks among the top universities for economic and campus ethnic diversity according to U.S. News & World Report's "America's Best Colleges 2012". Nearly 45 percent of all SDSU graduates are the first in their family to receive a college degree.

Internationally, SDSU offers 335 international education programs in 52 countries. Thirty-four SDSU programs now require international experience for graduation. SDSU ranks first in California among universities of its type in California and third among all universities in California for students studying abroad as part of their college experience. SDSU also ranks 22nd among universities nationwide for the number of students studying abroad (Institute of International Education). Since 2000, nearly 12,000 students have studied abroad: a 900 percent increase in that time. SDSU's undergraduate international business program ranks eleventh in the nation, according to U.S. News & World Report's "America's Best Colleges 2012". SDSU is ranked fifth in Sports Management; 23rd in the MBA/MA in Latin American Studies; and 46th in the MBA/Juris Doctor program by Eduniversal for each programs' international outreach and reputation in 2011. SDSU and Universidad Autónoma de Baja California in Mexico offered the first transnational dual degree between the United States and Mexico, in 1994, through the MEXUS/International Business program. SDSU's international business program also runs transnational dual degree programs with Brazil, Canada, Chile, and Mexico. SDSU's Language Acquisition Resource Center is one of nine sites selected by the U.S. Department of Education to serve as a National Language Resource Center.

SDSU is home to the first-ever MBA program in Global Entrepreneurship. As part of the program, students study at four universities worldwide, including the United States, China, the Middle East, and India. Corporate partners include Qualcomm, Invitrogen, Intel, Microsoft, and KPMG. In 1970, SDSU founded the first women's studies program in the country.

Modern Healthcare ranked SDSU second for graduate schools for physician executives in relation to their Master in Public Health program. SDSU is ranked No. 9 in Fortune Small Business's "America's Best Colleges For Entrepreneurs".

In 2016, San Diego State University's Conrad Prebys Aztec Student Union achieved LEED Double Platinum status, joining an elite group of energy-efficient buildings. The recognition is shared by fewer than two dozen facilities around the world.

== Organization and administration ==
=== Schools and colleges ===
SDSU comprises three liberal arts colleges:

- College of Arts & Letters
- College of Sciences
- College of Professional Studies & Fine Arts

and five vocational colleges,

- Global Campus (and American Language Institute)
- Fowler College of Business
- College of Education
- College of Engineering
- College of Health & Human Services (including the Graduate School of Public Health)

It is also home to the Weber Honors College.

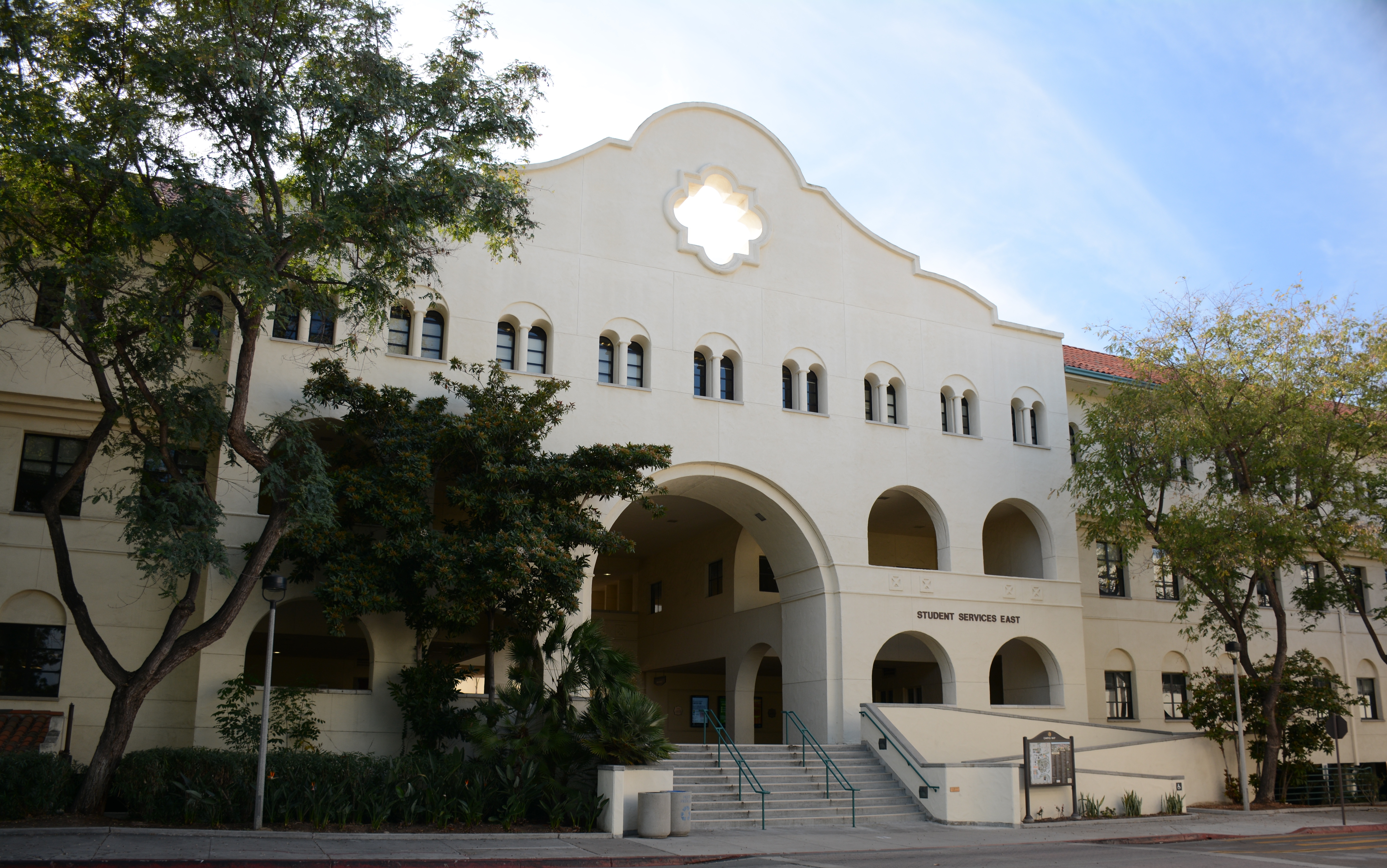
Fowler College of Business

SDSU has two named schools established in the university by permanent endowments:

- L. Robert Payne School of Hospitality and Tourism Management
- Charles W. Lamden School of Accountancy

Additionally, SDSU has 11 focused schools:

- School of Communication
- School of Public Affairs
- School of Music and Dance
- School of Art and Design
- School of Exercise and Nutritional Science
- School of Social Work
- Graduate School of Public Health
- School of Journalism and Media Studies
- School of Nursing
- School of Speech, Language, and Hearing Sciences
- School of Theatre, Television, and Film

=== Endowment ===
The financial endowment of SDSU is valued at $495.6 million as of 2021. The primary philanthropic arm of San Diego State University is the Campanile Foundation, controlled by the University Advancement division of the university. The San Diego State University Research Foundation, an auxiliary corporation owned and controlled by the university, is the manager and administrator of all philanthropic funds and external funding for the university and its affiliated and auxiliary foundations and corporations.

As of June 30, 2021, permanent assets of the SDSU Campanile Foundation totaled over $520 million.

For the 2004–2005 academic year, SDSU received over US$157 million in external funding from grants and contracts, as well as an additional US$57 million in donations and charitable giving. For 2005–2006, SDSU received US$152 million in grants and contracts to support research. This is followed by US$47.7 million in donations, gifts and other charitable giving.

== Athletics ==
San Diego State athletics monogram

SDSU's intercollegiate athletic teams are referred to as the "Aztecs". The university currently sponsors six men's and eleven women's sports programs at the varsity level. SDSU competes in NCAA Division I (FBS). Its primary conference is the Pac-12 Conference; its women's rowing team competes in the American Athletic Conference, its women's water polo team participates in the Golden Coast Conference, and its men's soccer team is a single-sport member of the Pac-12 Conference (Pac-12). The ice hockey team competes in the ACHA with other western region club teams (www.sdsuhockey.com). The university colors are scarlet (red) and black, SDSU's athletic teams are called the "Aztecs", and its mascot is the Aztec Warrior, formerly referred to as "Monty Montezuma".

As of 2021, athletes from the university have won 14 medals at the Olympic Games.

=== Baseball ===
The baseball team plays at Tony Gwynn Stadium, opened in 1997 and named after former SDSU baseball and basketball player, late baseball head coach, and Major League Baseball first ballot Hall of Fame inductee Tony Gwynn, who played his entire professional career with the San Diego Padres. The playing field is officially called Charlie Smith Field, after the longtime SDSU baseball head coach Charles R. Smith.

=== Football ===
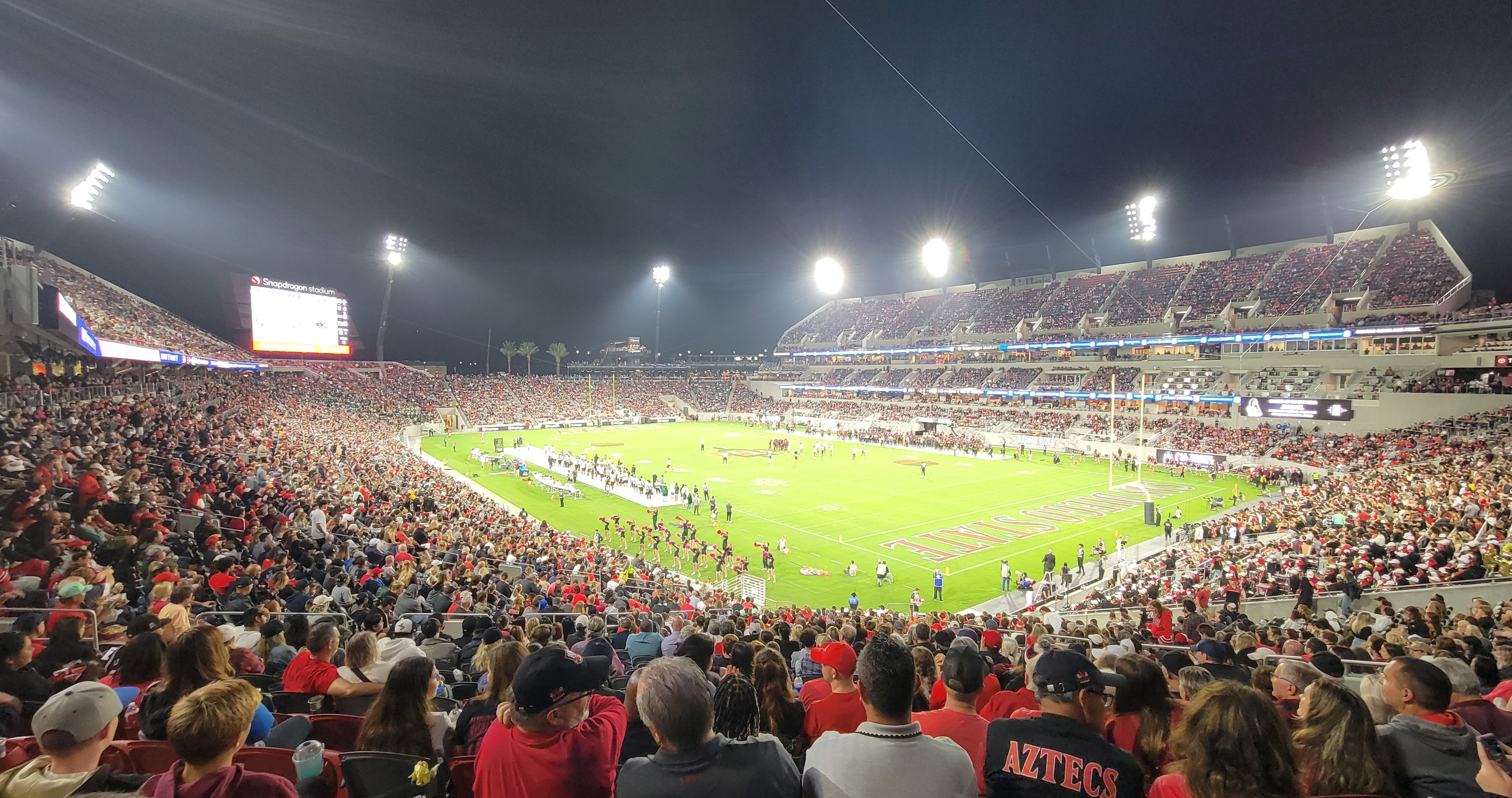
Snapdragon Stadium, home of San Diego State Aztecs football

The football team competes in the Football Bowl Subdivision (FBS) of the National Collegiate Athletic Association (NCAA). The team started playing at the new Snapdragon Stadium in 2022. The Fresno State–San Diego State football rivalry is between the Fresno State Bulldogs and San Diego State Aztecs. The winner of the game receives the "Old Oil Can" trophy.

=== Basketball ===
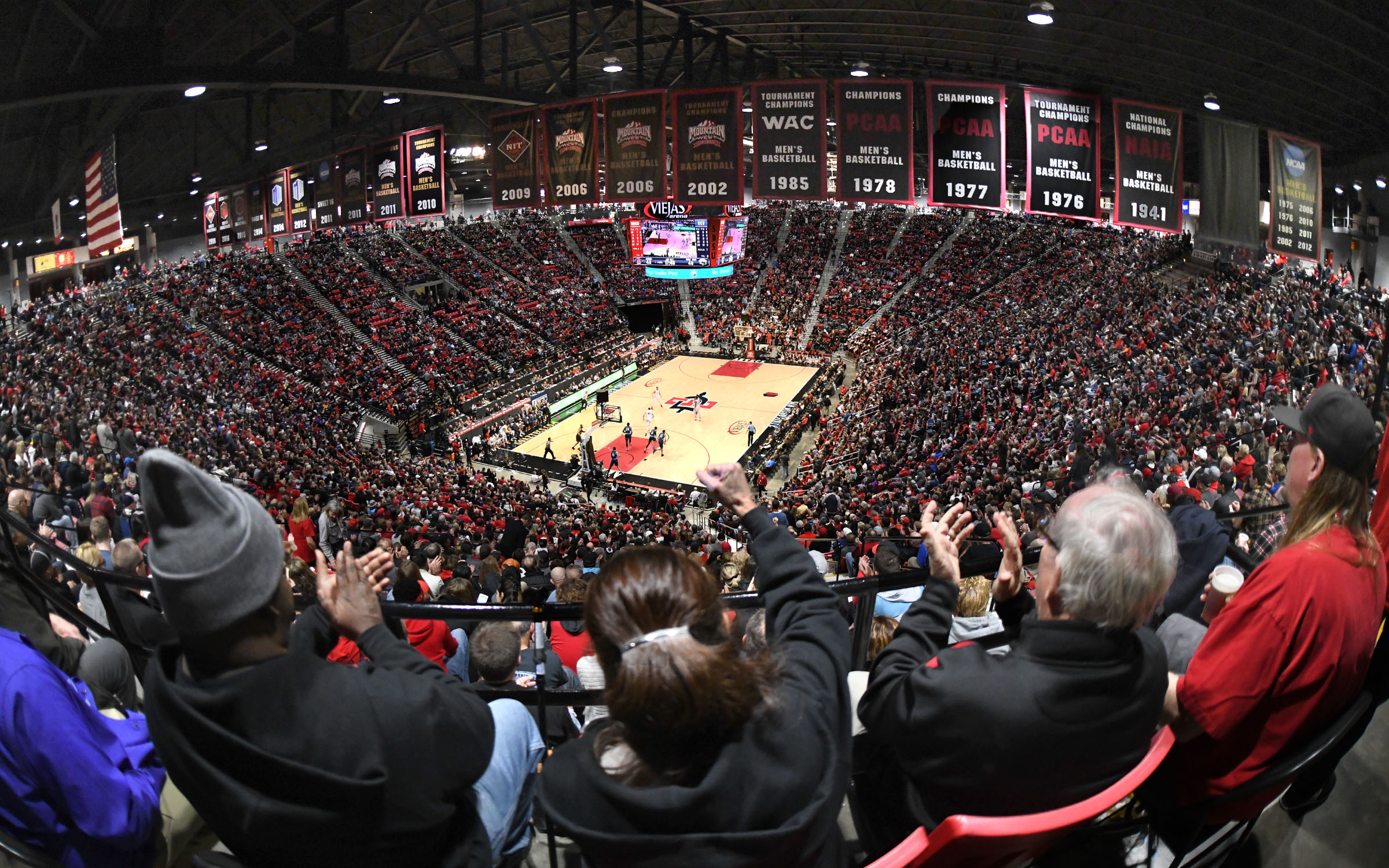
Viejas Arena, home of San Diego State Aztecs men's and women's basketball

The men's and women's basketball teams play at Viejas Arena, opened in 1997, on the SDSU campus. The court is officially named Steve Fisher Court, after longtime SDSU basketball head coach Steve Fisher. Both teams practice at the Jeff Jacobs JAM Center, a basketball practice facility that opened on campus in 2015. The men's Aztecs team began play in 1921 and have been to fifteen NCAA Division I tournaments and six NIT tournaments since joining NCAA Division I in 1969, the best finish coming recently in the 2023 NCAA Division I men's basketball tournament.

=== Soccer ===
The men's and women's soccer teams both play at the SDSU Sports Deck, a facility opened in 2000 that also hosts the women's track and field team. The women compete in the Mountain West Conference while the men compete in the Pac-12 Conference. In 1987, the men's team reached the NCAA Division I Men's Championship final, losing to the Clemson Tigers.

=== Volleyball ===
The women's volleyball team plays at Peterson Gymnasium's Aztec Court. The former men's volleyball team won the 1973 NCAA men's volleyball tournament (SDSU's first and only NCAA Division I national championship to date in any sport), but the program was disbanded in 2000 due to budgetary constraints and necessity to maintain compliance with Title IX regulations.

=== Other sports ===
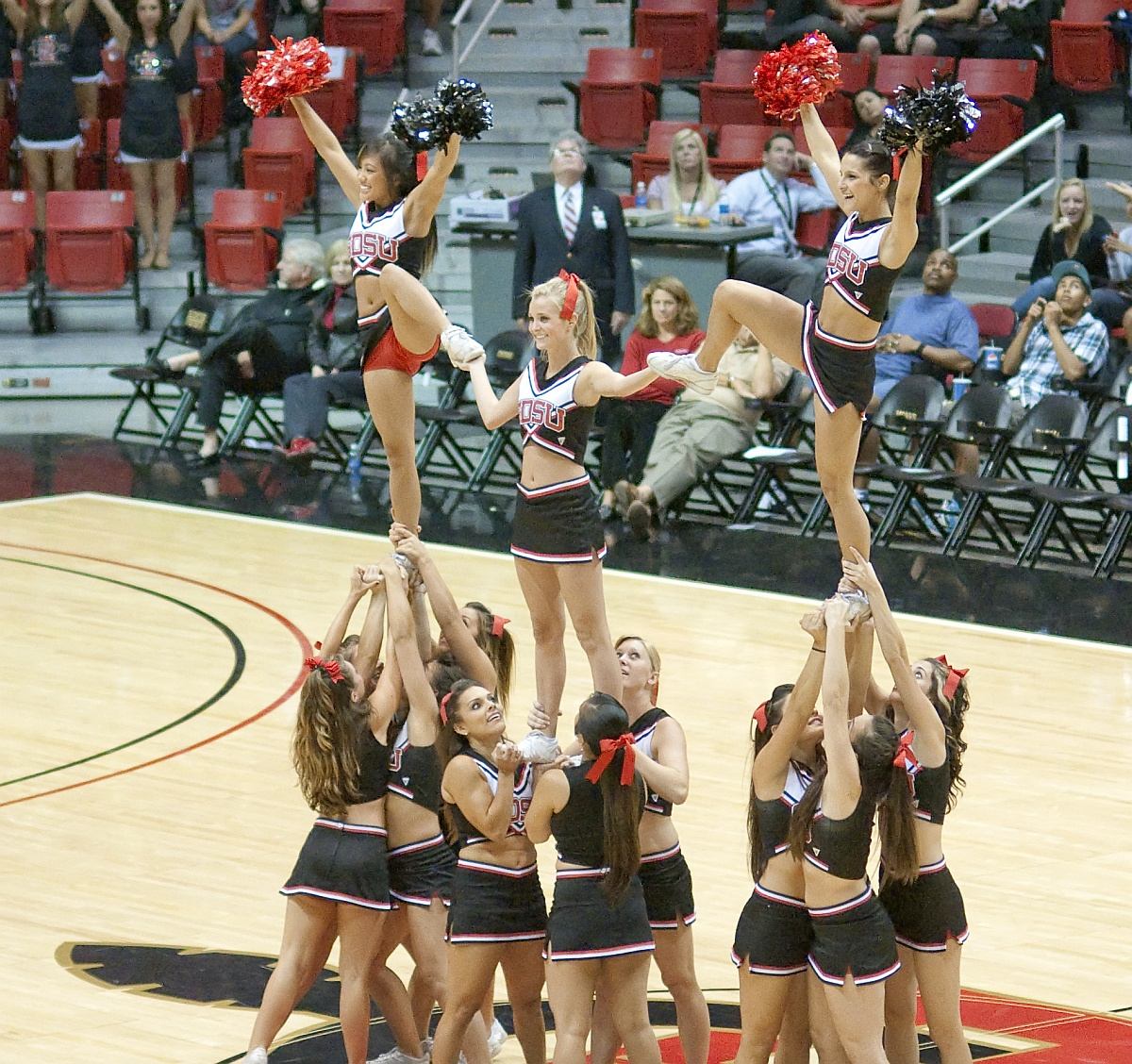
Aztec Cheer Team

- The SDSU Sports Deck is home to both the men's and women's soccer teams as well as the women's track & field team. The facility, opened in 2000, is located atop a two-story university parking structure and includes a natural grass soccer field with a built-in automatic drainage system, surrounded by a track (often dubbed the "Aztrack").
- The softball team plays at the SDSU Softball Stadium, completed in 2005 adjacent to Tony Gwynn Stadium.
- The women's swimming and diving and women's water polo teams are both based at the on-campus aquatic sports complex, known as the Aztec Aquaplex. The facility was opened in 2007 and includes an Olympic-size swimming pool with a moveable bulkhead, a separate recreational pool, and a hydrotherapy spa. It also serves as the recreational pool for SDSU students and community members.
- Both the men's and women's tennis teams play at the Aztec Tennis Center, a 12-court facility opened in 2005 on the western edge of the main campus
- A non-varsity club program, Aztecs rugby was founded in 1958. The rugby club fields both men's and women's teams; the men compete in Division 1-A in the California conference and the women play in the Pacific Desert conference of Division II. The Aztec men's team won the US National Collegiate Rugby Championship in 1987.
- Other non-varsity aquatic sports are based out of the Mission Bay Aquatic Center (MBAC) in Mission Bay, just a few miles west of the main campus. The Associated Students organization of San Diego State University, in conjunction with the University of California, San Diego recreation, owns and operates the MBAC. The facility provides opportunities for many outdoor activities and water sports for SDSU students.

== Student life ==
=== Media, newspapers, and magazines ===
Students began publishing The White and Gold in 1902, which was a literary magazine and newspaper. In 1913, a new newspaper was established entitled Normal News Weekly. The school newspaper Paper Lantern (Normal News Weekly was renamed after the addition of the junior college) became The Aztec in September 1925. It was later expanded to its current name, The Daily Aztec in fall 1959. The school's annual yearbook was named Del Sudoeste (Spanish for "of the southwest") in the early 1920s. The Koala, a comedy newspaper that is widely known around the San Diego State University area, is also distributed monthly on campus but is not directly connected to the school at the moment.

SDSU media and publications

- San Diego State University Press
- KCR (SDSU) College Radio
- KPBS Public Broadcasting TV/FM
- 360 Magazine
- Montezuma Publishing

SDSU campus newspapers

- The Daily Aztec, the largest daily collegiate newspaper in California, publishing daily since 1960
- The Koala, an independent satirical collegiate newspaper distributed on campus

=== Clubs ===
Initial clubs that were first started on campus including the Debating Club, the Associated Student Body, YWCA, and in 1906, An Alumni Association. The oldest club on campus was the Rowing Association.

==== Formula SAE ====
Aztec Racing is SDSU's Society of Automotive Engineers (SAE) student chapter. Every year, SDSU engineering students design and construct an open wheel, open cockpit race car to Formula SAE specifications. Aztec Racing then competes against other universities' Formula SAE teams in an annual competition event, where the cars are raced against each other and judged on design. Attendance at Formula SAE competition is international, with several hundreds of schools competing each year. Students from other majors participate as well, frequently in the areas of management, promotion and other aspects of the project.

=== Greek life ===
Fraternities and sororities have been a part of the San Diego State University campus community for over a century. Today SDSU is home to many recognized Greek-letter organizations, most of which belonging to one of four university-sponsored governing councils.

The Interfraternity Council (IFC) currently consists of 15 active social fraternities. The College Panhellenic Association (CPA) is made up of 8 active social sororities.

=== LGBT-friendly campus ===
San Diego State University was recognized in 2016 among the best universities in the nation for supporting LGBT students. The Campus Pride Index recently ranked SDSU on its 2016 "Best of the Best" Top 30 list of LGBTQ-friendly colleges and universities. SDSU has been included in this ranking for the past seven years along with institutions like Princeton University and Cornell University.

SDSU was recognized in 2014 as one of 20 of the most Lesbian, Gay, Bisexual, Transgender-friendly campuses in all of the U.S. The university attains this recognition through its welcome week LGBT reception, Safe Zone ally training, Big Gay BBQs, participating in Aids Walk San Diego and Pride San Diego, hosting an LGBT college fair, and holding a Lavender Graduation ceremony and several lecture series. The university is one of the few campuses in California that is home to the gay social fraternity, Delta Lambda Phi. Additionally, SDSU was the first university in California to offer a major in LGBT studies, while also offering a minor and graduate degree in the discipline. In 2014, SDSU opened a first-ever Pride Center at the former Student Organization Annex, with the mission to provide resources and help meet the needs and challenges of LGBT students.

=== S Mountain ===
On February 27, 1931, President Hardy permitted 500 students to paint rocks to form a 400-foot (120 m) white S on Cowles Mountain. The idea of "S Mountain" was created by the Council of Twelve and initially supported by Hardy. The giant S was lit at night for the opening football game of a season (performed by the freshman to build school spirit) along with pep rallies, and was repainted throughout its history. At the time, it was the largest collegiate symbol in the world. During World War II, the S was camouflaged to prevent it becoming a reference point for enemy bombing aircraft. It was returned to its normal state in April 1944. In the 1970s students stopped painting it and brush obstructed the symbol. After a 1988 brush fire it was exposed, and students repainted it. In fall 1997, a group of 100 volunteers climbed Cowles Mountain after dusk to commemorate the one hundredth anniversary of the school by using flashlights to once again outline the S on the side of the mountain. In 1990, a high school prank defaced the S to read as "91" in honor of their graduating class.

=== School colors and history of the Aztec mascot ===
The initial colors of the school were white and gold. When the junior college was added to the campus in 1921, its colors of blue and gold were merged, resulting in a blue, gold, and white color scheme. New colors were later chosen as gold and purple, until being replaced by scarlet and black on January 28, 1928.

The school's prior nicknames for its mascot included "Normalites", "Professors", and "Wampus Cats". The origin of the Aztec mascot is disputed among historians of the university but the first reported manifestation of the moniker concerned a student, Frederick Osenberg (Class of 1926), who came up with the idea of the San Diego State Aztecs while walking by the California Tower in Balboa Park, and became inspired by various murals of indigenous people from Latin America.” In 1925, the student body voted to adopt the Aztec moniker. The decision to choose the Aztec as a moniker was in conjunction with preliminary plans to move to a new campus and was done in unison with changing the name of the school newspaper to ‘The Aztec’ and featuring a yearbook with prominent Aztec symbols. The mascot transition was first mentioned in the January 21, 1925, edition of the school's newspaper at the time, The Paper Lantern (1921–1925). In the article, State Adopts New Moniker For Athletes, opens with an improvised fight song, "Rah for the Aztecs! What a name! What a name! Did you say Ash cans? Say I thought those cannibals were all dead! Whaddaya think this is? An Indian reservation? I'll bet Hopis are responsible for this”. The reasoning behind the choice of mascot is also mentioned directly:

"We have been called Aztecs and will be called Aztecs in the future. The 'name has' been used to denote a nation of semi-civilized inhabitants of central Mexico. What it will mean in the future remains for us to say. If we build an institution famous for its scholars, for its athletes, for its faculty; if we build a reputation for broadmindedness, for honesty, and for sportsmanship, these attributes will be incorporated into the same Aztecs. On the other hand – but there is no other hand in this picture. We are going to make the Aztecs mean all these finer things. Tradition will know Aztecs as something more than a tribe of semi-civilized inhabitants of Central Mexico...A name should stand for something more than a combination of letters. It should bear traditions, should call up thoughts of courage and fighting spirit. Such a tribe were the Aztecs. Noted for their fleetness, strength and bravery, they were seldom downed in physical encounters. The Aztecs are gone but their spirit and name remains, waiting all these years for State College to assume its burden. Vive la Aztec!”

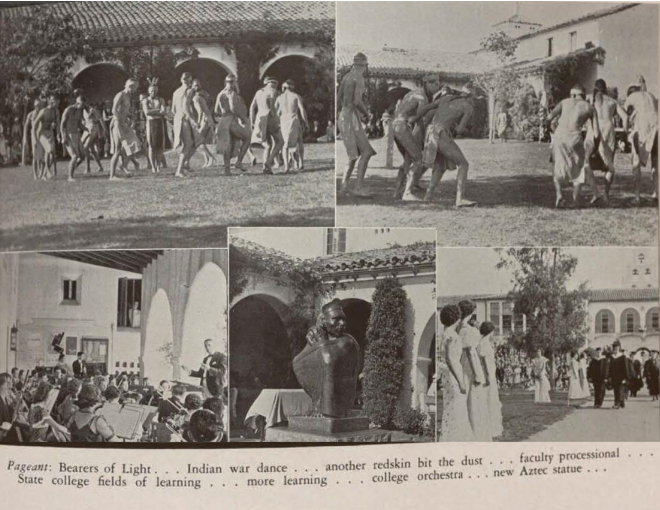
The dedication ceremony for a Donal Hord's sculpture, "Aztec" feature in the 1937 Yearbook, Del Sudoeste.

In 1937, the artist, Donal Hord, completed "Aztec" for San Diego State College as an artistic representation of the Aztec mascot. The Depression-era Works Project Administration (WPA) partially funded the sculpture, created from a single 2.5-ton block of black diorite. The stone base was presented as a gift to the school by the class of 1937. In 2002, the sculpture was moved to the Prospective Student Center and in 2009, the SDSU Alumni Association installed a large concrete replica in the rotunda of the Parma Payne Goodall Alumni Center. The dedication ceremony included an elaborate dance circle with students, bare-chested, dressed in Plains Indian costumes. This style of performance was seen at the school throughout the mid-century.

The mascot continued to evolve and in 1941, for the first time, a student portrayed an Aztec in a football game skit. The character became known as Monty Montezuma. "The first student to dress up as Monty was Art Munzig, who played the role during the opening football game of the 1941 season. He and four scantily clad cheerleaders in Plains Indian costumes secretly hid in a makeshift teepee on the sidelines and emerged at halftime with Montezuma chasing the maidens down the track in front of the stands." In 2000, the SDSU Associated Students’ University Council passed a resolution, backed by the Native American Student Alliance, that called for retiring the Aztec moniker and Montezuma mascot due to racism and culturally insensitivity and President Stephen Weber appoints a task force to make recommendations on the Aztec moniker and Montezuma mascot. This task force recommended updating logos and symbols to be culturally appropriate and historically accurate; defining Montezuma as an ambassador but not as a mascot; educating the university community on Aztec history and culture; and strengthening programs and events that support indigenous communities. The Monty Montezuma mascot was renamed the Ambassador Montezuma in 2002. Ambassador Montezuma debuts to speak on Aztec history and culture at events, but he is poorly received. To keep the tradition of the Montezuma mascot, Alumni form the Aztec Warrior Foundation and unveil an unofficial, more historically accurate Aztec Warrior representation. The school officially retired Ambassador Montezuma shortly after in 2003. During the same year, the Aztec Warrior becomes official through a referendum vote of students and alumni.

In 2010, SDSU briefly debuts Zuma, a jaguar mascot, at football games. The jaguar was retired in 2012.

Throughout the 2010s, the Aztec mascot has continued to be a point of controversy for the school. The last known vote regarding the mascot occurred in 2018. SDSU President Sally Roush appointed a 17-member Aztec Identity Task Force composed of students, faculty, staff, alumni and members at large and reports to the University Senate her decisions to continue the use of the Aztec identity. She also established a governing authority, chaired by the president, to ensure recognition of and reverence for the Aztec civilization become part of daily life at SDSU. President Roush made the decision to discontinue using the Aztec Warrior as a mascot, while retaining it as a "Spirit Leader."

==== Mascot controversy ====
Like other mascots referencing historical tribes and cultures, the Aztec mascot has periodically been the topic of question. It was not cited as "hostile and abusive" by the NCAA in 2005. NCAA spokesman Erik Christianson said the organization "accepted the findings from SDSU that it could not find any organized tribe or group related to Aztecs." Then President Weber explained his findings in a letter written on April 27, 2005, to the NCAA's vice president for education services, Ron Stratten. "As I mentioned in my letter on January 3, 2003, the Aztecs are not a Native American or American Indian culture," Weber wrote. "However, the Aztecs are central to the cultural heritage of Mexico." However, the Aztec Warrior has drawn criticism.

Directly following the NCAA Native American mascot decision, the Native American Student Alliance (NASA) posted an official statement about the university mascot on their Facebook page. The statement said the mascot "embodies the existence of institutionalized racism." A student group leader at the time was quoted voicing concern about the impact of utilizing stereotypical Native clothes, breathing fire and using sacred objects to whip up the crowd. These concerns were also vocalized by NASA in their official statement, where they voiced concern about the impact of the mascot on campus life after a 2009 party hosted by the fraternity Sigma Alpha Epsilon, with the theme “Cowboys and Nava-hoes." Although the school placed the fraternity on probation, President Hirshman's statement about cultural appropriation drew attention to "all of the performances of racialized stereotypes by faculty and students, baton twirlers in feathered headdresses, students dressed as imagined Indians, faux ceremonies, chants, songs, the names of the dorms, the names of the rooms of the new student union, t-shirts and banners proclaiming 'We Are Aztecs'."

Other points of contention have included worry that the mascot teaches the mistaken idea that Aztecs were a local tribe rather than living in Mexico 1,000 miles away.

The SDSU Native American Student Alliance (NASA) continues to support removal of the mascot in an official statements made to the Committee on Diversity, Equity and Outreach. Although that resolution was rejected by the SDSU Associated Students, the University Senate, which represents the administration, faculty, staff and students, had voted to phase out the human depiction of the Aztec Warrior.

In May 2021, the senate of the university opted a vote for commission to replace the human depiction of the Aztec Warrior for at least two animals of the Kumeyaay heritage. The commission would be working alongside local tribe leaders for the decisions leading up to a final replacement mascot.

== Incidents ==
=== 1996 campus shooting ===
A shooting occurred on campus on August 15, 1996. A 36-year-old graduate engineering student, while apparently defending his thesis, shot and killed his three professors, Constantinos Lyrintzis, Cheng Liang, and D. Preston Lowrey III, at San Diego State University. The shooter, who was suffering from certain mental problems, was convicted on July 19, 1997, and was sentenced to life in prison. As a memorial, tables with a plaque with information about each victim have been placed adjacent to the College of Engineering building.

=== 2008 student drug arrests ===
On May 6, 2008, the Drug Enforcement Administration (DEA) announced the arrests of 96 individuals, of whom 33 were San Diego State University students, on a variety of drug charges in a year-long narcotics sting operation dubbed Operation Sudden Fall. It was originally reported that 75 of the arrested were students, but the inflated number included students who had been arrested months earlier, in some cases for simple possession. The bust, which was the largest in the history of San Diego County, drew a mixed reaction from the community.

=== 2014 sexual assault allegation ===
In late 2014, SDSU began an "It's on Us" campaign to combat an alarming pattern of sexual violence. In the fall 2014 semester, there were 14 sexual assault allegations reported on or around the College Area. In early 2015, SDSU was found to have wrongfully accused a male foreign exchange student of sexual assault during the fall 2014 semester and allegedly failing to afford him due process. The student's name was released in a campus-wide email immediately upon his arrest and he was quickly expelled from the university. Alexa Romano, the female student who made the accusation, later admitted to not being truthful about the alleged incident. The male student later successfully sued the university.

== Notable alumni and faculty ==
San Diego State University has over 400,000 alumni worldwide. The university is one of the top producers of U.S. Student Fulbright Scholars in the nation.

== Bibliography ==
- Starr, Raymond; Harry Polkinhorn (1995). San Diego State University: A History in Word and Image. San Diego State University Press. ISBN 1-879691-30-2.
