= 1986 in sports =

1986 in sports describes the year's events in world sport.

== Alpine skiing ==
- Alpine Skiing World Cup –
  - Men's overall season champion: Marc Girardelli, Luxembourg
  - Women's overall season champion: Maria Walliser, Switzerland

== American football ==
- Super Bowl XX – the Chicago Bears (NFC) won 46–10 over the New England Patriots (AFC)
  - Location: Superdome
  - Attendance: 73,818
  - MVP: Richard Dent, DE (Chicago)
- Linebacker Lawrence Taylor of the New York Giants wins the NFL Most Valuable Player Award
- January 1 – Orange Bowl (1985 season):
  - The Oklahoma Sooners won 25–10 over the Penn State Nittany Lions to win the national championship
- Quarterback Vinny Testaverde of the Miami Hurricanes is awarded the Heisman Trophy

== Association football ==
- 1986 FIFA World Cup – In the final, Argentina defeated West Germany 3–2 and won their second World Cup title. It was played for the second time in Mexico City, Azteca Stadium.
- UEFA Champions League – Steaua București 0–0 F.C. Barcelona; Steaua București won 2–0 on penalties
- UEFA Cup –Two legs; 1st leg Real Madrid C.F. 5–1 1. FC Köln; 2nd leg 1.FC Köln 2–0 Real Madrid CF. Real Madrid CF won 5–3 on aggregate
- Cup Winners' Cup – Dinamo Kiev 3–0 Atlético Madrid
- Super Cup – Steaua București 1–0 Dinamo Kiev
- Copa Libertadores de América – Two legs; 1st leg América de Cali 1–2 River Plate; 2nd leg River Plate 1–0 América. River Plate won 3–1 on aggregate
- November 6 – Alex Ferguson is appointed manager of Manchester United F.C.
- Milk Cup Final held at Wembley Stadium – Oxford United 3–0 QPR
- Intercontinental Cup – River Plate 1–0 Steaua București

== Australian rules football ==
- Victorian Football League
  - Hawthorn wins the 90th VFL Premiership (Hawthorn 16.14 (110) d Carlton 9.14 (68))
  - Brownlow Medal awarded to Greg Williams (Sydney Swans) and Robert DiPierdomenico (Hawthorn)
  - The national draft is held for the first time.

== Baseball ==
- Major League Baseball
  - American League defeats the National League 3–2 in the 1986 Major League Baseball All-Star Game played in Houston, Texas. Roger Clemens of the Boston Red Sox is named the game's Most Valuable Player.
  - All-Star Game: American League Manager Dick Howser is diagnosed with brain cancer after mixing up signals during the game.
  - Dave Righetti saves 46 games for the New York Yankees, breaking a record shared by Dan Quisenberry and Bruce Sutter.
  - October 27 – World Series – The New York Mets win 4 games to 3 over the Boston Red Sox. The series is best remembered for Game 6, when the Red Sox were one out away from the Series victory but blew a 2-run lead with the bases empty and 2 outs in the bottom of the 10th inning; the game's final play was a groundball that rolled through the legs of first baseman Bill Buckner.
- Jeff King of the University of Arkansas is the #1 overall pick in the 1986 MLB draft selected by the Pittsburgh Pirates
- Arizona Wildcats defeat Florida State Seminoles 10–2 in College World Series

== Basketball ==
- NCAA Men's Basketball Championship –
  - Louisville Cardinals wins 72–69 over Duke Blue Devils
  - Duke Blue Devils Guard Johnny Dawkins is named Naismith College Player of the Year
- NBA Finals
  - June – Boston Celtics win 4 games to 2 over the Houston Rockets
- Boston Celtics Forward Larry Bird is awarded NBA Most Valuable Player Award
- National Basketball League (Australia) Finals:
  - Adelaide 36ers defeated the Brisbane Bullets 2–1 in the best-of-three final series.
- FIBA World Championship
  - United States World Champion

== Boxing ==
- March 10 in Las Vegas, Nevada – Marvin Hagler retains the World Middleweight Championship with an 11th-round knockout of John Mugabi.
- May 8 to 18 – Fourth World Amateur Boxing Championships are held in Reno, United States
- November 22 – Mike Tyson knocks out Trevor Berbick in round 2 to become the youngest world heavyweight-boxing champion at 20 years and 4 months old

== Canadian football ==
- Grey Cup – Hamilton Tiger-Cats won 39–15 over the Edmonton Eskimos
- Vanier Cup – UBC Thunderbirds won 25–23 over the Western Ontario Mustangs

== Cricket ==
- Sri Lanka defeats Pakistan to win the 1986 Asia Cup, the second edition of the Asia Cup.
- Pakistan national cricket team defeats India in the final to win the 1986 Austral-Asia Cup, the inaugural edition of the Austral-Asia Cup.

== Cycling ==
- Giro d'Italia won by Roberto Visentini of Italy
- Tour de France – Greg LeMond is the first winner from the United States
- UCI Road World Championships – Men's road race – Moreno Argentin of Italy

== Dogsled racing ==
- Iditarod Trail Sled Dog Race Champion –
  - Susan Butcher won with lead dogs: Granite & Mattie

== Field hockey ==
- Men's World Cup held in London won by Australia
- Women's World Cup held in Amstelveen won by the Netherlands
- Men's Champions Trophy held in Karachi won by West Germany

== Figure skating ==
- World Figure Skating Championships –
  - Men's champion: Brian Boitano, United States
  - Ladies' champion: Debi Thomas, United States
  - Pair skating champions: Ekaterina Gordeeva / Sergei Grinkov, Soviet Union
  - Ice dancing champions: Natalia Bestemianova / Andrei Bukin, Soviet Union

== Gaelic Athletic Association ==
- Camogie
  - All-Ireland Camogie Champion: Kilkenny
  - National Camogie League: Cork
- Gaelic football
  - All-Ireland Senior Football Championship – Kerry 2–15 died Tyrone 1–10
  - National Football League – Laois 2–6 died Monaghan 2–5
- Ladies' Gaelic football
  - All-Ireland Senior Football Champion: Kerry
  - National Football League: Wexford
- Hurling
  - All-Ireland Senior Hurling Championship – Cork 4–13 died Galway 2–15
  - National Hurling League – Kilkenny 2–10 beat Galway 2–6

== General ==
- 17 October – The IOC votes that the 1992 Olympic Summer Games will be held in Barcelona, Spain.

== Golf ==
Men's professional

- Masters Tournament – Jack Nicklaus becomes the oldest Masters winner (age 46), and wins his last major golf championship (excluding the Senior PGA Tour).
- U.S. Open – Raymond Floyd
- British Open – Greg Norman
- PGA Championship – Bob Tway
- PGA Tour money leader – Greg Norman – $653,296
- Senior PGA Tour money leader – Bruce Crampton – $454,299

Men's amateur

- British Amateur – David Curry
- U.S. Amateur – Buddy Alexander
- European Amateur – Anders Haglund

Women's professional

- Nabisco Dinah Shore – Pat Bradley
- LPGA Championship – Pat Bradley
- U.S. Women's Open – Jane Geddes
- Classique du Maurier Classic – Pat Bradley
- LPGA Tour money leader – Pat Bradley – $492,021

== Harness racing ==
- North America Cup – Quite A Sensation
- United States Pacing Triple Crown races –
  1. Cane Pace – Barberry Spur
  2. Little Brown Jug – Barberry Spur
  3. Messenger Stakes – Amity Chef
- United States Trotting Triple Crown races –
  1. Hambletonian – Nuclear Kosmos
  2. Yonkers Trot – Gunslinger Spur
  3. Kentucky Futurity – Sugarcane Hanover
- Australian Inter Dominion Harness Racing Championship –
  - Pacers: Village Kid

== Horse racing ==
Steeplechases

- Cheltenham Gold Cup – Dawn Run
- Grand National – West Tip

Flat races

- Australia – Melbourne Cup won by At Talaq
- Canada – Queen's Plate won by Golden Choice
- France – Prix de l'Arc de Triomphe won by Dancing Brave
- Ireland – Irish Derby Stakes won by Shahrastani
- Japan – Japan Cup won by Jupiter Island
- English Triple Crown Races:
  1. 2,000 Guineas Stakes – Dancing Brave
  2. The Derby – Shahrastani
  3. St. Leger Stakes – Moon Madness
- United States Triple Crown Races:
  1. Kentucky Derby – Ferdinand
  2. Preakness Stakes – Snow Chief
  3. Belmont Stakes – Danzig Connection
- Breeders' Cup World Thoroughbred Championships:
  1. Breeders' Cup Classic – Skywalker
  2. Breeders' Cup Distaff – Lady's Secret
  3. Breeders' Cup Juvenile – Capote
  4. Breeders' Cup Juvenile Fillies – Brave Raj
  5. Breeders' Cup Mile – Last Tycoon
  6. Breeders' Cup Sprint – Smile
  7. Breeders' Cup Turf – Manila

== Ice hockey ==
- Art Ross Trophy as the NHL's leading scorer during the regular season: Wayne Gretzky, Edmonton Oilers
- Hart Memorial Trophy for the NHL's Most Valuable Player: Wayne Gretzky, Edmonton Oilers
- Stanley Cup – Montreal Canadiens won 4 games to 1 over the Calgary Flames
- World Hockey Championship –
  - Men's champion: Soviet Union defeated Sweden
  - Junior Men's champion: Soviet Union defeated Canada

== Lacrosse ==
- The 5th World Lacrosse Championship is held in Toronto. The United States win, and Canada is the runner-up.
- The first Japanese lacrosse team is formed at Keio University.
- The Major Indoor Lacrosse League (MILL) is formed as the Eagle Pro Box Lacrosse League.
- The New Westminster Salmonbellies win the Mann Cup.
- Mississauga wins the Founders Cup.
- The Peterborough Maulers win the Minto Cup.

== Radiosport ==
- Third Amateur Radio Direction Finding World Championship held in Sarajevo, Yugoslavia.

== Rugby league ==
- 1986 Kangaroo tour of Great Britain and France
- 1986 National Panasonic Cup
- 1986 New Zealand rugby league season
- 1986 NSWRL season
- 1986 Pacific Cup
- 1986–87 Rugby Football League season / 1985–86 Rugby Football League season
- 1986 State of Origin series
- 1985–1988 Rugby League World Cup

== Rugby union ==
- 92nd Five Nations Championship series is shared by France and Scotland

== Snooker ==
- World Snooker Championship – Joe Johnson beats Steve Davis 18–12
- World rankings – Steve Davis remains world number one for 1986/87

== Swimming ==
- The fifth FINA World Championships held in Madrid, Spain
- June 26 – Matt Biondi clocks 22.33 to take the world record from fellow American Tom Jager (22.40) in the 50m freestyle (long course)

== Tennis ==
- Grand Slam in tennis men's results:
  1. Australian Open – no tournament held
  2. French Open – Ivan Lendl
  3. Wimbledon championships – Boris Becker
  4. U.S. Open – Ivan Lendl
- Grand Slam in tennis women's results:
  1. Australian Open – no tournament held
  2. French Open – Chris Evert
  3. Wimbledon championships – Martina Navratilova
  4. U.S. Open – Martina Navratilova
- Davis Cup – Australia won 3–2 over Sweden in world tennis.

== Volleyball ==
- Men's World Championship held in Paris won by USA
- Women's World Championship held in Prague won by China

== Water polo ==
- Men's World Championship held in Madrid won by Yugoslavia
- Women's World Championship held in Madrid won by Australia

== Multi-sport events ==
- Asian Games held in Seoul, South Korea
- Winter Asian Games held in Sapporo, Japan
- Central American and Caribbean Games held in Santiago de los Caballeros, Dominican Republic
- Commonwealth Games held in Edinburgh, Scotland
- Summer Goodwill Games held in Moscow, Soviet Union

== Awards ==
- ABC Wide World of Sports Athlete of the Year – Debi Thomas, Figure Skating
- Associated Press Male Athlete of the Year – Larry Bird, NBA Finals NBA basketball
- Associated Press Female Athlete of the Year – Martina Navratilova, Tennis
- Joe Paterno is named Sports Illustrated Sportsman of the Year
