= 1986 LPGA Tour =

Golf tour season

1986 LPGA Tour season
- Duration: January 23, 1986 – November 9, 1986
- Number of official events: 33
- Most wins: 5 (United States) Pat Bradley
- Money leader: (United States) Pat Bradley
- Player of the Year: (United States) Pat Bradley
- Vare Trophy: (United States) Pat Bradley
- Rookie of the Year: (United States) Jody Rosenthal

The 1986 LPGA Tour was the 37th season since the LPGA Tour officially began in 1950. The season ran from January 23 to November 9. The season consisted of 33 official money events. Pat Bradley won the most tournaments, five, including three of the four majors. She also led the money list with earnings of $492,021.

There were five first-time winners in 1986: Jane Geddes, Cindy Mackey, Becky Pearson, and Ai-Yu Tu. Tu was the first Taiwanese winner, winning the Mazda Japan Classic.

The tournament results and award winners are listed below.

== Tournament results ==
The following table shows all the official money events for the 1986 season. "Date" is the ending date of the tournament. The numbers in parentheses after the winners' names are the number of wins they had on the tour up to and including that event. Majors are shown in bold.

Date	Tournament	Location	Winner	Score	Purse ($)	1st prize ($)
Jan 26	Mazda Classic	Florida	(United States) Val Skinner (2)	280 (−8)	200,000	30,000
Feb 2	Elizabeth Arden Classic	Florida	(Japan) Ayako Okamoto (6)	280 (−8)	200,000	30,000
Feb 9	Sarasota Classic	Florida	(United States) Patty Sheehan (15)	279 (−9)	200,000	30,000
Feb 23	Standard Register/Samaritan Turquoise Classic	Arizona	(United States) Mary Beth Zimmerman (1)	278 (−10)	250,000	37,500
Mar 2	Uniden LPGA Invitational	California	(United States) Mary Beth Zimmerman (2)	281 (−7)	330,000	49,500
Mar 9	Women's Kemper Open	Hawaii	(United States) Juli Inkster (5)	276 (−12)	300,000	45,000
Mar 16	GNA/Glendale Federal Classic	California	(United States) Christa Johnson (3)	212 (−4)	250,000	37,500
Mar 23	Circle K Tucson Open	Arizona	(Australia) Penny Pulz (2)	276 (−12)	200,000	30,000
Apr 6	**Nabisco Dinah Shore**	California	(United States) **Pat Bradley (17)**	280 (−8)	430,000	75,000
Apr 13	Kyocera Inamori Classic	California	(United States) Patty Sheehan (16)	278 (−10)	200,000	30,000
Apr 27	S&H Golf Classic	Florida	(United States) Pat Bradley (18)	272 (−16)	200,000	30,000
May 11	United Virginia Bank Classic	Virginia	(United States) Muffin Spencer-Devlin (2)	214 (−2)	250,000	37,500
May 18	Chrysler-Plymouth Classic	New Jersey	(United States) Becky Pearson (1)	212 (−7)	200,000	30,000
May 25	LPGA Corning Classic	New York	(United States) Laurie Rinker (2)	278 (−10)	250,000	37,500
Jun 1	**LPGA Championship**	Ohio	(United States) **Pat Bradley (19)**	277 (−11)	300,000	45,000
Jun 8	McDonald's Championship	Pennsylvania	(United States) Juli Inkster (6)	281 (−7)	450,000	67,500
Jun 15	Lady Keystone Open	Pennsylvania	(United States) Juli Inkster (7)	210 (−6)	250,000	37,500
Jun 22	Rochester International	New York	(United States) Judy Dickinson (2)	281 (−7)	255,000	38,250
Jun 29	Mayflower Classic	Indiana	(United States) Sandra Palmer (19)	280 (−8)	350,000	52,500
Jul 6	Mazda Hall of Fame Championship	Texas	(United States) Amy Alcott (25)	284 (−4)	300,000	45,000
Jul 13	**U.S. Women's Open**	Ohio	(United States) **Jane Geddes (1)**	287 (−1)	300,000	50,000
Jul 20	Boston Five Classic	Massachusetts	(United States) Jane Geddes (2)	281 (−7)	275,000	41,250
Jul 27	**du Maurier Classic**	Canada	(United States) **Pat Bradley (20)**	276 (−12)	350,000	52,500
Aug 3	LPGA National Pro-Am	Colorado	(United States) Amy Alcott (26)	283 (−5)	300,000	45,000
Aug 10	Henredon Classic	North Carolina	(United States) Betsy King (6)	277 (−11)	230,000	34,500
Aug 17	MasterCard International Pro-Am	New York	(United States) Cindy Mackey (1)	276 (−12)	200,000	30,000
Aug 17	Nestle World Championship	Georgia	(United States) Pat Bradley (21)	279 (−9)	240,000	78,000
Aug 24	Atlantic City LPGA Classic	New Jersey	(United States) Juli Inkster (8)	209 (−4)	225,000	33,750
Sep 1	Rail Charity Classic	Illinois	(United States) Betsy King (7)	205 (−11)	200,000	30,000
Sep 7	Cellular One-Ping Golf Championship	Oregon	(Japan) Ayako Okamoto (7)	207 (−9)	200,000	30,000
Sep 14	Safeco Classic	Washington	(United States) Judy Dickinson (3)	274 (−14)	200,000	30,000
Sep 21	Konica San Jose Classic	California	(United States) Patty Sheehan (17)	212 (−4)	275,000	41,250
Nov 9	Mazda Japan Classic	Japan	(Taiwan) Ai-Yu Tu (1*)	213 (−6)	300,000	45,000

* - non-member at time of win

== Awards ==
Award	Winner	Country
Money winner	Pat Bradley	United States
Scoring leader (Vare Trophy)	Pat Bradley	United States
Player of the Year	Pat Bradley	United States
Rookie of the Year	Jody Rosenthal	United States
