= 1996 U.S. Women's Open =

Coordinates: 35.197°N 79.392°W

Tournament information
- Dates: May 30 – June 2, 1996
- Location: Southern Pines, North Carolina
- Course: Pine Needles Lodge and Golf Club
- Organized by: USGA
- Tour: LPGA Tour

Statistics
- Par: 70
- Length: 6,207 yards (5,676 m)
- Cut: 148 (+8)
- Prize fund: $1.2 million
- Winner's share: $212,500

Champion
- (Sweden) Annika Sörenstam
- 272 (−8)

Location in the United States
Location in North Carolina

The 1996 U.S. Women's Open was the 51st U.S. Women's Open, held May 30 to June 2 at Pine Needles Lodge and Golf Club in Southern Pines, North Carolina.

Defending champion Annika Sörenstam retained the title, six strokes ahead of runner-up Kris Tschetter. It was the second of her ten major titles; her third came nearly five years later. ESPN and NBC Sports televised the tournament.

Sörenstam was the sixth of seven to win consecutive titles at the U.S. Women's Open, most recently accomplished by Karrie Webb in 2001, also at Pine Needles. The championship returned to the venue for a third time in 2007, won by Cristie Kerr.

This was the first women's major with a winner's share of $200,000 or more; the U.S. Women's Open became the tour's richest major this year, passing the LPGA Championship.

== Round summaries ==
=== First round ===
Thursday, May 30, 1996

Place	Player	Score	To par
T1	(United States) Beth Daniel	69	−1
T1	(United States) Kim Williams	69	−1
T3	(United States) Brandie Burton	70	E
T3	(Japan) Riko Higashio (a)	70	E
T3	(Peru) Jenny Lidback; Sweden	70	E
T3	(United States) Michele Redman	70	E
T3	(Sweden) Annika Sörenstam	70	E
T3	(United States) Kris Tschetter	70	E
T9	(United States) Jane Geddes	71	+1
T9	(England) Trish Johnson	71	+1
T9	(United States) Rosie Jones	71	+1
T9	(United States) Emilee Klein	71	+1
T9	(Scotland) Catriona Matthew	71	+1
T9	(United States) Missie McGeorge	71	+1
T9	(United States) Joan Pitcock	71	+1
T9	(United States) Maggie Will	71	+1

=== Second round ===
Friday, May 31, 1996

Place	Player	Score	To par
1	(Sweden) Annika Sörenstam	70-67=137	−3
T2	(United States) Brandie Burton	70-70=140	E
T2	(United States) Jane Geddes	71-69=140	E
T2	(United States) Emilee Klein	71-69=140	E
5	(United States) Rosie Jones	71-70=141	+1
T6	(Italy) Stefania Croce	72-70=142	+2
T6	(England) Laura Davies	74-68=142	+2
T6	(Canada) Gail Graham	72-70=142	+2
T6	(United States) Tammie Green	72-70=142	+2
T6	(United States) Joan Pitcock	71-71=142	+2
T6	(United States) Val Skinner	74-68=142	+2

=== Third round ===
Saturday, June 1, 1996

Place	Player	Score	To par
1	(Sweden) Annika Sörenstam	70-67-69=206	−4
2	(United States) Brandie Burton	70-70-69=209	−1
3	(United States) Jane Geddes	71-69-70=210	E
T4	(United States) Pat Bradley	74-70-67=211	+1
T4	(United States) Tammie Green	72-70-69=211	+1
T6	(England) Laura Davies	74-68-70=212	+2
T6	(Canada) Nancy Harvey	72-71-69=212	+2
T6	(Japan) Mayumi Hirase	74-69-69=212	+2
T6	(United States) Michele Redman	70-73-69=212	+2
T6	(United States) Kris Tschetter	70-74-68=212	+2

=== Final round ===
Sunday, June 2, 1996

Place	Player	Score	To par	Money ($)
1	(Sweden) Annika Sörenstam	70-67-69-66=272	−8	212,500
2	(United States) Kris Tschetter	70-74-68-66=278	−2	125,000
T3	(United States) Brandie Burton	70-70-69-71=280	E	60,373
T3	(United States) Jane Geddes	71-69-70-70=280	E	60,373
T3	(United States) Pat Bradley	74-70-67-69=280	E	60,373
6	(England) Laura Davies	74-68-70-69=281	+1	40,077
7	(Sweden) Catrin Nilsmark	72-73-68-69=282	+2	35,995
T8	(United States) Cindy Rarick	73-70-72-68=283	+3	29,584
T8	(Sweden) Liselotte Neumann	74-69-70-70=283	+3	29,584
T8	(United States) Tammie Green	72-70-69-72=283	+3	29,584
T8	(United States) Val Skinner	74-68-71-70=283	+3	29,584
