= 1985 du Maurier Classic =

Coordinates: 45.444039°N 73.830811°W

The 1985 du Maurier Classic was contested from July 25–28 at Beaconsfield Golf Club. It was the 13th edition of the du Maurier Classic, and the seventh edition as a major championship on the LPGA Tour.

This event was won by Pat Bradley.

== Final leaderboard ==
Place	Player	Score	To par	Money (US$)
1	(United States) Pat Bradley	70-73-67-68=278	−10	45,000
2	(United States) Jane Geddes	73-64-71-71=279	−9	27,750
3	(United States) Amy Alcott	69-71-72-68=280	−8	20,250
T4	(United States) Sally Little	68-69-74-70=281	−7	14,250
T4	(United States) Val Skinner	74-65-70-72=281	−7	14,250
T6	(United States) Christa Johnson	68-71-73-70=282	−6	9,675
T6	(United States) Jo Ann Washam	74-70-68-70=282	−6	9,675
T8	(United States) Cathy Morse	71-73-70-69=283	−5	7,425
T8	(United States) Laurie Rinker	68-69-74-72=283	−5	7,425
T10	(United States) Lori Garbacz	71-71-71-71=284	−4	5,550
T10	(Canada) Barb Scherbak	71-71-73-69=284	−4	5,550
T10	(United States) Patty Sheehan	70-75-71-68=284	−4	5,550
T10	(United States) Hollis Stacy	72-70-71-71=284	−4	5,550
