= 1987 LPGA Tour =

Golf tour season

1987 LPGA Tour season
- Duration: January 29, 1987 – November 8, 1987
- Number of official events: 33
- Most wins: 5 (United States) Jane Geddes
- Money leader: (Japan) Ayako Okamoto
- Player of the Year: (Japan) Ayako Okamoto
- Vare Trophy: (United States) Betsy King
- Rookie of the Year: (United States) Tammie Green

The 1987 LPGA Tour was the 38th season since the LPGA Tour officially began in 1950. The season ran from January 29 to November 8. The season consisted of 33 official money events. Jane Geddes won the most tournaments, five. Ayako Okamoto led the money list with earnings of $466,034.

There were seven first-time winners in 1987: Laura Davies, Rosie Jones, Yuko Moriguchi, Cindy Rarick, Deb Richard, Jody Rosenthal, and Colleen Walker.

The tournament results and award winners are listed below.

== Tournament results ==
The following table shows all the official money events for the 1987 season. "Date" is the ending date of the tournament. The numbers in parentheses after the winners' names are the number of wins they had on the tour up to and including that event. Majors are shown in bold.

Date	Tournament	Location	Winner	Score	Purse ($)	1st prize ($)
Feb 1	Mazda Classic	Florida	(United States) Kathy Postlewait (2)	286 (−2)	200,000	30,000
Feb 8	Sarasota Classic	Florida	(United States) Nancy Lopez (35)	281 (−7)	200,000	30,000
Feb 21	Tsumura Hawaiian Ladies Open	Hawaii	(United States) Cindy Rarick (1)	207 (−9)	300,000	45,000
Mar 1	Women's Kemper Open	Hawaii	(United States) Jane Geddes (3)	276 (−12)	300,000	45,000
Mar 8	GNA/Glendale Federal Classic	California	(United States) Jane Geddes (4)	286 (−2)	250,000	37,500
Mar 22	Circle K Tucson Open	Arizona	(United States) Betsy King (8)	281 (−7)	200,000	30,000
Mar 29	Standard Register Turquoise Classic	Arizona	(United States) Pat Bradley (22)	286 (−2)	300,000	45,000
Apr 5	**Nabisco Dinah Shore**	California	(United States) **Betsy King (9)**	283 (−5)	500,000	80,000
Apr 12	Kyocera Inamori Golf Classic	California	(Japan) Ayako Okamoto (8)	275 (−13)	200,000	30,000
Apr 19	Santa Barbara Open	California	(Australia) Jan Stephenson (14)	215 (−1)	300,000	45,000
May 3	S&H Golf Classic	Florida	(United States) Cindy Hill (2)	271 (−17)	225,000	33,750
May 10	United Virginia Bank Golf Classic	Virginia	(United States) Jody Rosenthal (1)	209 (−7)	250,000	37,500
May 17	Chrysler-Plymouth Classic	New Jersey	(Japan) Ayako Okamoto (9)	215 (−4)	225,000	33,750
May 24	**Mazda LPGA Championship**	Ohio	(United States) **Jane Geddes (5)**	275 (−13)	350,000	52,500
May 31	LPGA Corning Classic	New York	(United States) Cindy Rarick (2)	275 (−13)	275,000	41,250
Jun 7	McDonald's Championship	Delaware	(United States) Betsy King (10)	278 (−6)	500,000	75,000
Jun 14	Mayflower Classic	Indiana	(United States) Colleen Walker (1)	278 (−10)	350,000	52,500
Jun 21	Lady Keystone Open	Pennsylvania	(Japan) Ayako Okamoto (10)	208 (−8)	300,000	45,000
Jun 28	Rochester International	New York	(United States) Deb Richard (1)	280 (−8)	300,000	45,000
Jul 5	Jamie Farr Toledo Classic	Ohio	(United States) Jane Geddes (6)	280 (−8)	225,000	33,750
Jul 12	**du Maurier Ltd. Classic**	Canada	(United States) **Jody Rosenthal (2)**	272 (−16)	400,000	60,000
Jul 19	Boston Five Classic	Massachusetts	(United States) Jane Geddes (7)	277 (−11)	300,000	45,000
Jul 26	**U.S. Women's Open**	New Jersey	(England) **Laura Davies (1*)**	285 (−3)	325,000	55,000
Aug 2	Columbia Savings LPGA National Pro-Am	Colorado	(United States) Christa Johnson (4)	277 (−11)	250,000	37,500
Aug 9	Henredon Classic	North Carolina	(United States) Mary Beth Zimmerman (3)	206 (−10)	300,000	45,000
Aug 16	MasterCard International Pro-Am	New York	(United States) Val Skinner (3)	212 (−4)	225,000	33,750
Aug 23	Atlantic City LPGA Classic	New Jersey	(United States) Betsy King (11)	207 (−6)	225,000	33,750
Aug 30	Nestle World Championship	Georgia	(Japan) Ayako Okamoto (11)	282 (−6)	250,000	81,500
Sep 7	Rail Charity Classic	Illinois	(United States) Rosie Jones (1)	208 (−8)	200,000	30,000
Sep 13	Cellular One-Ping Golf Championship	Oregon	(United States) Nancy Lopez (36)	210 (−6)	225,000	33,750
Sep 20	Safeco Classic	Washington	(Australia) Jan Stephenson (15)	277 (−11)	225,000	33,750
Sep 27	Konica San Jose Classic	California	(Australia) Jan Stephenson (16)	205 (−11)	300,000	45,000
Nov 8	Mazda Japan Classic	Japan	(Japan) Yuko Moriguchi (1*)	206 (−10)	350,000	52,500

* - non-member at time of win

== Awards ==
Award	Winner	Country
Money winner	Ayako Okamoto	Japan
Scoring leader (Vare Trophy)	Betsy King	United States
Player of the Year	Ayako Okamoto	Japan
Rookie of the Year	Tammie Green	United States
