= Cathy Gerring =

American professional golfer (born 1961)

Personal information
- Full name: Cathy Kratzert Gerring
- Nationality: United States
- Born: April 28, 1961 (age 65) Fort Wayne, Indiana, U.S.
- Height: 5 ft 4 in (1.63 m)
- Spouse: Jim Gerring
- Children: 2

Career
- Sport: Golf
- College: Ohio State University
- Status: Professional
- Former tour: LPGA Tour (1985–2006)
- Professional wins: 3

Number of wins by tour
- LPGA Tour: 3

Best results in LPGA major championships
- Chevron Championship: T8: 1987
- Women's PGA C'ship: T28: 1987
- U.S. Women's Open: T9: 1990
- du Maurier Classic: T19: 1987
- Women's British Open: DNP

Cathy Kratzert Gerring (born April 28, 1961) is an American professional golfer who played on the LPGA Tour.

Born Cathy Kratzert, in Fort Wayne, Indiana, she played college golf at Ohio State University.

Gerring won three times on the LPGA Tour, all in 1990. She played on the 1990 Solheim Cup team.

In April 1992, Gerring was severely burned in a hospitality tent at the LPGA's Sara Lee Classic in Nashville, Tennessee. Due to her injuries, she did not play again on the LPGA Tour until 1996.

Gerring's brother, Billy Kratzert, won four times on the PGA Tour. They are one of only three brother/sister pairs to win on both tours.

In 2004, Gerring became the first woman inducted into the Little League Hall of Excellence. In 2019, she was inducted into the Indiana Golf Hall of Fame.

== Professional wins ==
=== LPGA Tour wins (3) ===
No.	Date	Tournament	Winning score	Margin of victory	Runner(s)-up
1	Jun 3, 1990	Lady Keystone Open	–8 (70-67-71=208)	1 stroke	(United States) Pat Bradley (United States) Elaine Crosby
2	Aug 12, 1990	Stratton Mountain LPGA Classic	–7 (71-70-72-68=281)	Playoff	(United States) Caroline Keggi
3	Oct 14, 1990	Trophee Urban World Championship	–10 (69-69-69-71=278)	1 stroke	(United States) Beth Daniel

LPGA Tour playoff record (1–4)

No.	Year	Tournament	Opponent(s)	Result
1	1986	Rail Charity Classic	(United States) Betsy King (United States) Alice Ritzman	King won with birdie on second extra hole
2	1986	Mazda Japan Classic	(United States) Becky Pearson (Taiwan) Ai-Yu Tu (United States) Mary Beth Zimmerman	Tu won with bogey on fourth extra hole Pearson and Zimmerman eliminated by birdie on first hole
3	1987	Women's Kemper Open	(United States) Jane Geddes	Lost to bogey on first extra hole
4	1990	Stratton Mountain LPGA Classic	(United States) Caroline Keggi	Won with birdie on first extra hole
5	1990	MBS LPGA Classic	(United States) Nancy Lopez	Lost to birdie on first extra hole

== Team appearances ==
Professional

- Solheim Cup (representing the United States): 1990 (winners)
