= Cindy Rarick =

American professional golfer (born 1959)

Personal information
- Nationality: United States
- Born: September 12, 1959 (age 67) Glenwood, Minnesota, U.S.
- Height: 5 ft 4 in (1.63 m)

Career
- Sport: Golf
- College: University of Hawaiʻi at Mānoa
- Status: Professional
- Former tour: LPGA Tour (joined 1985)
- Professional wins: 7

Number of wins by tour
- LPGA Tour: 5
- LPGA of Japan Tour: 1
- Other: 1

Best results in LPGA major championships
- Chevron Championship: 4th: 1990
- Women's PGA C'ship: T5: 1985
- U.S. Women's Open: T8: 1996
- du Maurier Classic: T13: 1992
- Women's British Open: DNP

Cindy Rarick (born September 12, 1959) is an American professional golfer. She competed as Cindy Flom in 1985 and from 1999 to 2001.

== Early life and amateur career ==
In 1959, Rarick was born in Glenwood, Minnesota. Her family moved to Arizona early in her life. In 1977, she graduated from Sahuaro High School. Rarick was the 1977 Arizona State Junior champion.

Rarick attended the University of Hawaiʻi at Mānoa. In 1978, she won the Hawaii Women's Match Play Championship and a year later she captured the Hawaii Stroke Play Championship title.

== Professional career ==
In 1985, Rarick joined the LPGA Tour. She won five tournaments on tour, her first in 1987. She also won the Gatorade Most Improved Player Award that year.

In 1990, she recorded her highest finish on the money list, 10th place. She also finished eleventh on the money list twice, in 1987 and 1989.

== Awards and honors ==
- In 1987, Rarick won the Gatorade Most Improved Player Award.
- In 1994, she was inducted into the Sahuaro High School Hall of Fame.

== Professional wins (7) ==
=== LPGA Tour wins (5) ===
| No. | Date | Tournament | Winning score | Margin of victory | Runner(s)-up |
|---|---|---|---|---|---|
| 1 | Feb 21, 1987 | Tsumura Hawaiian Ladies Open | –9 (69-71-67=207) | 2 strokes | (United States) Jane Geddes |
| 2 | May 31, 1987 | LPGA Corning Classic | –13 (70-69-69-67=275) | 1 stroke | (United States) Jane Geddes (United States) Betsy King (United States) Patty Sheehan |
| 3 | May 14, 1989 | Chrysler-Plymouth Classic | –5 (70-72-72=214) | 2 strokes | (England) Laura Davies |
| 4 | May 20, 1990 | Planters Pat Bradley International | 25 points (3-4-12-6) | 1 point | (United States) Beth Daniel |
| 5 | Aug 18, 1991 | Northgate Computer Classic | –13 (75-68-68=211) | Playoff | (United States) Jody Anschutz (United States) Beth Daniel |

LPGA Tour playoff record (1–2)

| No. | Year | Tournament | Opponent(s) | Result |
|---|---|---|---|---|
| 1 | 1991 | Women's Kemper Open | (United States) Deb Richard | Lost to birdie on second extra hole |
| 2 | 1991 | Northgate Computer Classic | (United States) Jody Anschutz (United States) Beth Daniel | Won with birdie on third extra hole Anschutz eliminated by par on first hole |
| 3 | 1993 | Minnesota LPGA Classic | (Japan) Hiromi Kobayashi | Lost to par on first extra hole |

=== LPGA of Japan Tour wins (1) ===
- 1987 Fujisankei Ladies Classic

=== Legends Tour wins (1) ===
- 2005 BJ's Charity Championship (with Jan Stephenson; tie with Pat Bradley and Patty Sheehan)

== Team appearances ==
Professional

- Handa Cup (representing the United States): 2006 (winners), 2007 (winners), 2008 (winners), 2009 (winners), 2010 (winners), 2011 (winners), 2012 (tie, Cup retained), 2013
