= Alice Ritzman =

American professional golfer (born 1952)

Personal information
- Nationality: United States
- Born: March 1, 1952 (age 74) Kalispell, Montana, U.S.
- Height: 5 ft 5 in (1.65 m)

Career
- Sport: Golf
- College: Eastern Montana College
- Status: Professional
- Former tours: LPGA Tour (1978–1998); Legends Tour

Best results in LPGA major championships
- Chevron Championship: T9: 1983
- Women's PGA C'ship: 2nd: 1994
- U.S. Women's Open: T15: 1987, 1991
- du Maurier Classic: T11: 1986

Alice Ritzman (born March 1, 1952) is an American professional golfer. She played on the LPGA Tour from 1978 to 1998.

== Early life and amateur career ==
Ritzman was born in Kalispell, Montana, on March 1, 1952. Ritzman was coached by Harvey Penick in Austin, Texas, where he worked as the golf coach at the University of Texas. Penick wrote a book on golf in which he refers to Ritzman as "little Alice Ritzman".

According to the LPGA, "Ritzman dominated amateur golf in her home state of Montana before joining the Tour." She won the Montana Junior Championship three times. She also won the Montana State Women's Amateur Championship in 1972 and 1973. In 1973, she graduated from Eastern Montana College in Billings, Montana. She earned a degree in physical education.

== Professional career ==
In 1979, during her first full year on tour, Ritzman established an LPGA all-time record, which still stands, by carding three eagles in one round at the 1979 Colgate European Open. Overall, her best results were three playoff losses she suffered: to Kathy Whitworth at the 1981 Coca-Cola Classic, to Hollis Stacy at the 1981 West Virginia Bank Classic, and to Betsy King at the 1986 Rail Charity Classic. In 1986, she also posted her career-low round of 64 at the Rochester International.

Ritzman crossed the $1 million mark in career earnings in 1992. When she retired in 1998, she had the highest ranking on the career money list (43) as a non-winner with $1,490,016. She became a golf commentator for ESPN. She still plays golf on the Legends Tour.

Ritzman subsequently worked as a realtor. She teaches golf to the boys and girls at Flathead High School. Ritzman is also a member of the Board of Trustees of School District 5 of the Kalispell Public Schools. She has a tournament named after her at Buffalo Hill Golf Club: the Alice Ritzman Golf Tournament.

== Awards and honors ==
In 1991, she was inducted in the Montana State Women's Golf Association's Hall of Fame.

== Playoff record ==
LPGA Tour playoff record (0–3)

No.	Year	Tournament	Opponent(s)	Result
1	1981	Coca-Cola Classic	(United States) Kathy Whitworth	Lost to birdie on second extra hole
2	1981	West Virginia Bank Classic	(United States) Susie McAllister (United States) Kathy Postlewait (Australia) Penny Pulz (United States) Hollis Stacy	Stacy won with birdie on first extra hole
3	1986	Rail Charity Classic	(United States) Cathy Gerring (United States) Betsy King	King won with birdie on second extra hole
