= 1987 LPGA Championship =

Coordinates: 39.349°N 84.278°W

Tournament information
- Dates: May 21–24, 1987
- Location: Mason, Ohio
- Courses: Jack Nicklaus Golf Center; Grizzly Course
- Tour: LPGA Tour
- Format: Stroke play - 72 holes

Statistics
- Par: 72
- Length: 6,202 yards (5,671 m)
- Cut: 145 (+1)
- Prize fund: $350,000
- Winner's share: $52,500

Champion
- (United States) Jane Geddes
- 275 (−13)

Location in the United States
Location in Ohio

The 1987 LPGA Championship was held May 21–24 at Jack Nicklaus Golf Center at Kings Island in Mason, Ohio, a suburb northeast of Cincinnati. Played on the Grizzly Course, this was the 33rd edition of the LPGA Championship.

Jane Geddes won her second major championship, a stroke ahead of runner-up Betsy King.

== Final leaderboard ==
Sunday, May 24, 1987

Place	Player	Score	To par	Money ($)
1	(United States) Jane Geddes	72-68-68-67=275	−13	52,500
2	(United States) Betsy King	72-68-69-67=276	−12	32,375
T3	(United States) Rosie Jones	70-68-72-68=278	−10	18,959
T3	(Japan) Ayako Okamoto	69-69-70-70=278	−10	18,959
T3	(United States) Laurie Rinker	69-67-71-71=278	−10	18,959
6	(United States) Cathy Morse	70-69-67-73=279	−9	12,250
T7	(United States) Patty Sheehan	68-70-74-68=280	−8	7,913
T7	(United States) Muffin Spencer-Devlin	70-72-71-67=280	−8	7,913
T9	(United States) Amy Alcott	73-70-69-69=281	−7	6,844
T9	(United States) Jody Rosenthal	72-68-72-69=281	−7	6,844
T9	(United States) Lori Garbacz	72-66-70-73=281	−7	6,844
T9	(United States) Juli Inkster	72-71-72-66=281	−7	6,844
T9	(United States) Kathy Postlewait	72-69-70-70=281	−7	6,844
