= Mary Beth Zimmerman =

American professional golfer (born 1960)

Personal information
- Nationality: United States
- Born: December 11, 1960 (age 65) Mount Vernon, Illinois, U.S.
- Height: 5 ft 4 in (1.63 m)

Career
- Sport: Golf
- College: Florida International University
- Turned professional: 1983
- Former tour: LPGA Tour (1984–2002)
- Professional wins: 4

Number of wins by tour
- LPGA Tour: 4

Best results in LPGA major championships
- Chevron Championship: 3rd: 1986
- Women's PGA C'ship: T17: 1984
- U.S. Women's Open: T24: 1995
- du Maurier Classic: T14: 1985
- Women's British Open: DNP

Mary Beth Zimmerman (born December 11, 1960) is an American professional golfer. She played on the LPGA Tour and won four times.

== Career ==
Zimmerman won four times on the LPGA Tour between 1986 and 1995.

== Professional wins (4) ==
=== LPGA Tour wins (4) ===
No.	Date	Tournament	Winning score	Margin of victory	Runner(s)-up
1	Feb 23, 1986	Standard Register/Samaritan Turquoise Classic	–10 (68-69-70-71=278)	1 stroke	(United States) Donna Caponi (United States) Cathy Gerring
2	Mar 2, 1986	Uniden LPGA Invitational	–7 (70-70-70-71=281)	1 stroke	(United States) Laura Baugh (United States) Pat Bradley
3	Aug 9, 1987	Henredon Classic	–10 (72-68-66=206)	3 strokes	(United States) Beth Daniel (United States) Nancy Lopez (United States) Laurie Rinker
4	Sep 4, 1995	State Farm Rail Classic	–10 (72-69-65=206)	Playoff	(United States) Emilee Klein

LPGA Tour playoff record (1–2)

No.	Year	Tournament	Opponent(s)	Result
1	1986	Mazda Japan Classic	(United States) Cathy Gerring (United States) Becky Pearson (Taiwan) Ai-Yu Tu	Tu won with bogey on fourth extra hole Pearson and Zimmerman eliminated by birdie on first hole
2	1995	State Farm Rail Classic	(United States) Emilee Klein	Won with birdie on second extra hole
