= Bonnie Bryant (golfer) =

American professional golfer (born 1943)

Personal information
- Nationality: United States
- Born: October 5, 1943 (age 83) Tulare, California, U.S.
- Height: 5 ft 4 in (1.63 m)

Career
- Sport: Golf
- College: College of the Sequoias
- Status: Professional
- Former tour: LPGA Tour (1971–1983)
- Professional wins: 1

Number of wins by tour
- LPGA Tour: 1

Best results in LPGA major championships
- Titleholders C'ship: DNP
- Chevron Championship: T52: 1983
- Women's PGA C'ship: T10: 1974
- U.S. Women's Open: T14: 1974
- du Maurier Classic: 77th: 1980

Bonnie Bryant (born October 5, 1943) is an American professional golfer who played on the LPGA Tour. She is the only player in LPGA Tour history to win a tournament left-handed.

== Career ==
Bryant was born in Tulare, California. She did not take up golf until age 20, learning from Vic Lombardi, a National League pitcher for Brooklyn and Pittsburgh. Prior to taking up golf, she played five years of AAA-fast pitch softball.

Bryant joined the LPGA Tour in 1971. She won once on the LPGA Tour. Her win came at the 1974 Bill Branch LPGA Classic in Fort Myers, Florida. She shot a 7-under-par, 209 to claim the $5,700 first prize. She also lost to Nancy Lopez in a five-way sudden death playoff at the 1979 Coca-Cola Classic.

== Professional wins (1) ==
=== LPGA Tour wins (1) ===
No.	Date	Tournament	Winning score	Margin of victory	Runners-up
1	Nov 17, 1974	Bill Branch LPGA Classic	−7 (71-71-67=209)	3 strokes	(United States) Maria Astrologes (United States) Jane Blalock (United States) Shelley Hamlin (United States) Hollis Stacy

LPGA Tour playoff record (0–1)

No.	Year	Tournament	Opponents	Result
1	1979	Coca-Cola Classic	(United States) Nancy Lopez (United States) Hollis Stacy (United States) Jo Ann Washam (United States) Mickey Wright	Lopez won with birdie on second extra hole Bryant, Stacy, and Washam eliminated by birdie on first hole
