= 1983 U.S. Women's Open =

Coordinates: 36.013°N 95.853°W

Tournament information
- Dates: July 28–31, 1983
- Location: Broken Arrow, Oklahoma
- Course: Cedar Ridge Country Club
- Organized by: USGA
- Tour: LPGA Tour

Statistics
- Par: 71
- Length: 6,298 yards (5,759 m)
- Prize fund: $200,000
- Winner's share: $32,780

Champion
- (Australia) Jan Stephenson
- 290 (+6)

Location in the United States
Location in Oklahoma

The 1983 U.S. Women's Open was the 38th U.S. Women's Open, held July 28–31 at Cedar Ridge Country Club in Broken Arrow, Oklahoma, a suburb southeast of Tulsa.

In oppressive heat, Jan Stephenson won her third and final major championship with a score of 290 (+6), a stroke ahead of runners-up JoAnne Carner and Patty Sheehan.

The low amateur was 18-year-old Heather Farr of Phoenix, who tied for eleventh place at 296 (+12).

== Final leaderboard ==
Sunday, July 31, 1983

Place	Player	Score	To par	Money ($)
1	(Australia) Jan Stephenson	72-73-71-74=290	+6	32,780
T2	(United States) JoAnne Carner	81-70-72-68=291	+7	15,400
T2	(United States) Patty Sheehan	71-71-76-73=291	+7	15,400
4	(United States) Patti Rizzo	75-74-73-70=292	+8	9,659
5	(United States) Cathy Morse	76-71-77-69=293	+9	7,708
T6	(United States) Dot Germain	73-72-76-73=294	+10	5,998
T6	(United States) Myra Blackwelder	77-72-72-73=294	+10	5,998
T8	(Japan) Ayako Okamoto	77-73-75-70=295	+11	4,714
T8	(Australia) Jane Lock	75-73-72-75=295	+11	4,714
T8	(United States) Pat Bradley	72-76-71-76=295	+11	4,714
