= Cindy Mackey =

American professional golfer (born 1961)

Personal information
- Full name: Cindy Pleger Mackey
- Nationality: American
- Born: April 2, 1961 (age 65) Athens, Georgia, U.S.
- Height: 5 ft 9 in (1.75 m)

Career
- Sport: Golf
- College: University of Georgia
- Status: Professional
- Former tour: LPGA Tour (1983–1996)
- Professional wins: 1

Number of wins by tour
- LPGA Tour: 1

Best results in LPGA major championships
- Chevron Championship: T31: 1989
- Women's PGA C'ship: 6th: 1986
- U.S. Women's Open: T35: 1986
- du Maurier Classic: T44: 1991

Cindy Mackey (born April 2, 1961) is an American professional golfer who played on the LPGA Tour. She also played under her maiden name, Cindy Pleger, before her marriage in 1984.

Mackey won once on the LPGA Tour in 1986.

== Amateur wins ==
This list may be incomplete.

- 1982 Canadian Women's Amateur

== Professional wins ==
=== LPGA Tour wins (1) ===
No.	Date	Tournament	Winning score	Margin of victory	Runners-up
1	Aug 17, 1986	MasterCard International Pro-Am	−12 (71-70-65-70=276)	14 strokes	(United States) Cathy Johnston (United States) Jody Rosenthal
