= 1986 Nabisco Dinah Shore =

Coordinates: 33.798°N 116.433°W

Tournament information
- Dates: April 3–6, 1986
- Location: Rancho Mirage, California
- Course: Mission Hills Country Club
- Tour: LPGA Tour
- Format: Stroke play - 72 holes

Statistics
- Par: 72
- Length: 6,275 yards (5,738 m)
- Field: 104 players, 79 after cut
- Cut: 154 (+10)
- Prize fund: $430,000
- Winner's share: $75,000

Champion
- (United States) Pat Bradley
- 280 (−8)

Location in the United States
Location in California

The 1986 Nabisco Dinah Shore was a women's professional golf tournament, held April 3–6 at Mission Hills Country Club in Rancho Mirage, California. This was the 15th edition of the Nabisco Dinah Shore, and the fourth as a major championship.

Pat Bradley won the fourth of her six major titles, two strokes ahead of runner-up Val Skinner. Bradley held the 54-hole lead, three strokes ahead of 1984 champion Juli Inkster. Defending champion Alice Miller finished 22 strokes back, in a tie for 54th place.

Bradley won three of the four majors in 1986, narrowly missing the grand slam with a fifth place in the U.S. Women's Open.

== Final leaderboard ==
Sunday, April 6, 1986

Place	Player	Score	To par	Money ($)
1	(United States) Pat Bradley	68-72-69-71=280	−8	75,000
2	(United States) Val Skinner	71-72-70-69=282	−6	40,000
3	(United States) Mary Beth Zimmerman	70-73-72-70=285	−3	25,000
4	(United States) Betsy King	70-71-74-72=287	−1	17,385
T5	(United States) Jane Geddes	75-73-70-70=288	E	12,980
T5	(United States) Juli Inkster	69-71-72-76=288	E	12,980
T5	(Australia) Jan Stephenson	71-72-76-69=288	E	12,980
T8	(United States) Penny Hammel	72-74-73-70=289	+1	9,379
T8	(United States) Patti Rizzo	74-70-71-74=289	+1	9,379
T10	(United States) Myra Blackwelder	72-72-72-74=290	+2	7,010
T10	(United States) Jerilyn Britz	72-74-75-69=290	+2	7,010
T10	(United States) Sandra Palmer	72-70-73-75=290	+2	7,010
T10	(United States) Becky Pearson	72-76-67-75=290	+2	7,010
