= 1986 U.S. Women's Open =

Coordinates: 39.680°N 84.196°W

Tournament information
- Dates: July 10–13, 1986
- Location: Kettering, Ohio
- Courses: NCR Country Club, South Course
- Organized by: USGA
- Tour: LPGA Tour

Statistics
- Par: 72
- Length: 6,243 yards (5,709 m)
- Field: 150 players, 78 after cut
- Cut: 153 (+9)
- Prize fund: $300,000
- Winner's share: $50,000

Champion
- (United States) Jane Geddes
- 287 (−1), playoff

Location in the United States
Location in Ohio

The 1986 U.S. Women's Open was the 41st U.S. Women's Open, held July 10–13 at the South Course of NCR Country Club in Kettering, Ohio, a suburb south of Dayton.

Jane Geddes won the first of her two major titles in an 18-hole Monday playoff, winning by two strokes over Sally Little. It was the fifth playoff at the U.S. Women's Open and the first in ten years.

This was the only of the four majors in 1986 that was not won by Pat Bradley; she narrowly missed the grand slam with a fifth-place finish, three strokes back.

NCR's South Course previously hosted the PGA Championship in 1969.

== Final leaderboard ==
Sunday, July 13, 1986

Place	Player	Score	To par	Money ($)
T1	(United States) Jane Geddes	74-74-70-69=287	−1	Playoff
T1	(United States) Sally Little	73-72-72-70=287	−1	Playoff
T3	(Japan) Ayako Okamoto	76-69-69-74=288	E	16,534
T3	(United States) Betsy King	72-71-70-75=288	E	16,534
T5	(United States) Amy Alcott	75-69-74-72=290	+2	9,196
T5	(United States) Jody Rosenthal	72-76-71-71=290	+2	9,196
T5	(United States) Judy Dickinson	72-71-74-73=290	+2	9,196
T5	(United States) Pat Bradley	76-71-74-69=290	+2	9,196
T9	(United States) Cathy Morse	75-71-75-70=291	+3	6,801
T9	(United States) Deb Richard	76-69-72-74=291	+3	6,801

=== Playoff ===
Monday, July 14, 1986

Place	Player	Score	To par	Money ($)
1	(United States) Jane Geddes	35-36=71	−1	50,000
2	(United States) Sally Little	36-37=73	+1	25,000

==== Scorecard ====
Hole	1	2	3	4	5	6	7	8	9	10	11	12	13	14	15	16	17	18
Par	4	3	4	4	5	5	4	3	4	5	4	5	3	4	3	4	4	4
(United States) Geddes	E	−1	E	E	E	E	E	−1	−1	−1	−1	−2	−2	−3	−2	−2	−2	−1
(South Africa) (United States) Little	E	E	E	−1	−2	−3	−3	−2	E	−1	−1	−2	−2	−2	−1	−1	E	+1
