= PING/Welch's Championship =

Golf tournament formerly on the LPGA Tour

The PING/Welch's Championship was an annual golf tournament for professional female golfers on the LPGA Tour. Founded in 1980 as the Boston Five Classic, it took place every year in the Greater Boston area from 1980 through 1997. It was played at the Ferncroft Country Club in Danvers from 1980 to 1990 and at the Blue Hill Country Club in Canton from 1991 to 1997.

The tournament has had a variety of sponsors during its history. Its last title sponsors were Ping, a brand of golf equipment and Welch's, a North American producer of fruit juices.

Tournament names through the years:

- 1980–1990: Boston Five Classic
- 1991: LPGA Bay State Classic
- 1992: Welch's Classic
- 1993–1996: PING/Welch's Championship
- 1997: Welch's Championship

== Winners ==
Year	Champion	Country	Score	Venue	Purse ($)	Winner's share ($)
1997	Liselotte Neumann	Sweden	276 (−12)	Blue Hill Country Club	550,000	82,500
1996	Emilee Klein	United States	277 (−15)	Blue Hill Country Club	500,000	75,000
1995	Beth Daniel	United States	271 (−17)	Blue Hill Country Club	450,000	67,500
1994	Helen Alfredsson	Sweden	274 (−14)	Blue Hill Country Club	450,000	67,500
1993	Missie Berteotti	United States	276 (−12)	Blue Hill Country Club	450,000	67,500
1992	Dottie Pepper	United States	278 (−10)	Blue Hill Country Club	425,000	63,750
1991	Juli Inkster	United States	275 (−13)	Blue Hill Country Club	400,000	60,000
1990	Barb Mucha	United States	277 (−11)	Ferncroft Country Club	350,000	52,500
1989	Amy Alcott	United States	272 (−16)	Ferncroft Country Club	350,000	52,500
1988	Colleen Walker	United States	274 (−14)	Ferncroft Country Club	300,000	45,000
1987	Jane Geddes	United States	277 (−11)	Ferncroft Country Club	300,000	45,000
1986	Jane Geddes	United States	281 (−17)	Ferncroft Country Club	275,000	41,250
1985	Judy Clark	United States	280 (−8)	Ferncroft Country Club	225,000	33,750
1984	Laurie Rinker	United States	286 (−2)	Ferncroft Country Club	225,000	33,750
1983	Patti Rizzo	United States	277 (−11)	Ferncroft Country Club	175,000	26,250
1982	Sandra Palmer	United States	281 (−7)	Ferncroft Country Club	175,000	26,250
1981	Donna Caponi	United States	276 (−12)	Ferncroft Country Club	150,000	22,500
1980	Dale Lundquist	United States	276 (−12)	Ferncroft Country Club	150,000	22,500
