= Konica San Jose Classic =

Golf tournament formerly on the LPGA Tour

The Konica San Jose Classic was a golf tournament on the LPGA Tour from 1983 to 1989. It was played at the Almaden Golf & Country Club in San Jose, California.

== Winners ==
Year	Winner	Score	To par	Margin of victory	Runner(s)-up	Purse ($)	Winner's share ($)	Ref.
Konica San Jose Classic
1989	(United States) Beth Daniel	205	−11	1 stroke	(United States) Pat Bradley	325,000	48,750	
1988	(United States) Kathy Guadagnino	207	−9	1 stroke	(United States) Cathy Marino	300,000	45,000	
1987	(Australia) Jan Stephenson	205	−11	1 stroke	(United States) Amy Alcott	300,000	45,000	
1986	(United States) Patty Sheehan	212	−4	Playoff	(United States) Amy Alcott (United States) Betsy King (Japan) Ayako Okamoto	275,000	41,250	
1985	(United States) Val Skinner	209	−7	Playoff	(United States) Pat Bradley	250,000	37,250	
San Jose Classic
1984	(United States) Amy Alcott	211	−8	2 strokes	(United States) Betsy King (United States) Beverly Klass (United States) Pat Meyers (United States) Kathy Whitworth	175,000	26,250	
1983	(United States) Kathy Postlewait	213	−5	1 stroke	(Sweden) Charlotte Montgomery	175,000	26,250	
