= Kathy Postlewait =

American professional golfer (born 1949)

Personal information
- Nationality: United States
- Born: November 11, 1949 (age 76) Norfolk, Virginia, U.S.
- Height: 5 ft 8 in (1.73 m)

Career
- Sport: Golf
- College: East Carolina University
- Turned professional: 1972
- Former tour: LPGA Tour (1974-1999)
- Professional wins: 4

Number of wins by tour
- LPGA Tour: 4

Best results in LPGA major championships
- Chevron Championship: T2: 1990
- Women's PGA C'ship: T3: 1988
- U.S. Women's Open: T9: 1987
- du Maurier Classic: 6th: 1987

Kathy Postlewait (born November 11, 1949) is an American professional golfer who played on the LPGA Tour.

Postlewait won four times on the LPGA Tour between 1983 and 1989.

== Professional wins ==
=== LPGA Tour wins (4) ===
No.	Date	Tournament	Winning score	Margin of Victory	Runner-up
1	Oct 2, 1983	San Jose Classic	−6 (73-72-68=213)	1 stroke	(Sweden) Charlotte Montgomery
2	Feb 1, 1987	Mazda Classic	−2 (73-72-72-69=286)	Playoff	(United States) Betsy King
3	Jun 26, 1988	McDonald's Championship	−8 (69-68-69-70=276)	1 stroke	(United States) Patty Sheehan
4	Apr 30, 1989	Sara Lee Classic	−13 (68-66-69=203)	1 stroke	(United States) Val Skinner

LPGA Tour playoff record (1–4)

No.	Year	Tournament	Opponent(s)	Result
1	1981	West Virginia Bank Classic	(United States) Susie McAllister (Australia) Penny Pulz (United States) Alice Ritzman (United States) Hollis Stacy	Stacy won with birdie on first extra hole
2	1982	Orlando Lady Classic	(United States) Patty Sheehan	Sheehan won with par on fourth extra hole
3	1982	West Virginia LPGA Classic	(United States) Hollis Stacy	Lost to par on first extra hole
4	1987	Mazda Classic	(United States) Betsy King	Won with par on first extra hole
5	1988	USX Golf Classic	(United States) Rosie Jones	Lost to birdie on first extra hole
