= Greater Ft. Myers Classic =

Golf tournament formerly on the LPGA Tour

The Greater Ft. Myers Classic was a golf tournament on the LPGA Tour from 1974 to 1975. It was played at the Lochmoor Country Club in North Fort Myers, Florida.

In 1974, it was played as the Bill Branch LPGA Classic. Left-handed golfer Bonnie Bryant won the event by three strokes over Maria Astrologes, Jane Blalock, Shelley Hamlin, and Hollis Stacy.

In 1975, it was played as the Greater Ft. Myers Classic. Sandra Haynie won the event on the second hole of a sudden-death playoff with Pat Bradley.

== Winners ==
Greater Ft. Myers Classic

- 1975 Sandra Haynie

Bill Branch LPGA Classic

- 1974 Bonnie Bryant
