= Barb Bunkowsky =

Canadian professional golfer (born 1958)

Personal information
- Full name: Barbara Bunkowsky-Scherbak
- Nationality: Canada
- Born: October 13, 1958 (age 68) Toronto, Ontario, Canada
- Height: 5 ft 7 in (1.70 m)

Career
- Sport: Golf
- College: Florida State University
- Status: Professional
- Former tour: LPGA Tour (1983–2000)
- Professional wins: 1

Number of wins by tour
- LPGA Tour: 1

Best results in LPGA major championships
- Chevron Championship: T28: 1986
- Women's PGA C'ship: 3rd: 1993
- U.S. Women's Open: 19th: 1985
- du Maurier Classic: T4: 1987

Barbara Bunkowsky-Scherbak (born October 13, 1958) is a Canadian professional golfer who played on the LPGA Tour. She also played under her maiden name, Barb Bunkowsky, and her married name, Barb Scherbak.

== Career ==
Bunkowsky played college golf at Florida State University and helped her team win the 1981 AIAW Championship. She was inducted into the FSU Hall of Fame in 1994.

Bunkowsky won once on the LPGA Tour in 1984.

== Professional wins (1) ==
=== LPGA Tour wins (1) ===
| No. | Date | Tournament | Winning score | Margin of victory | Runner-up |
|---|---|---|---|---|---|
| 1 | May 20, 1984 | Chrysler-Plymouth Charity Classic | −10 (71-72-66=209) | 4 strokes | (United States) Muffin Spencer-Devlin |

== Team appearances ==
Professional

- Handa Cup (representing World team): 2006, 2007, 2008
