= 1990 Solheim Cup =

Women's team golf competition

- Dates: November 16–18, 1990
- Venue: Lake Nona Golf & Country Club
- Location: Orlando, Florida, United States
- Captains: Kathy Whitworth (USA); Mickey Walker (Europe)
(United States)	11 1/2	4 1/2	(Europe)
- United States wins the Solheim Cup

Location map
- Location within the United States Location within Florida

The inaugural Solheim Cup competition took place in Orlando, Florida, United States at Lake Nona Golf & Country Club from November 16 to November 18, 1990. The United States team beat the European team 11 1/2 points to 4 1/2.

== Teams ==
Europe

- Mickey Walker (Captain) - England
- Helen Alfredsson - Gothenburg, Sweden
- Laura Davies - Coventry, England
- Marie-Laure de Lorenzi - Biarritz, France
- Trish Johnson - Bristol, England
- Liselotte Neumann - Finspång, Sweden
- (England) Alison Nicholas - Gibraltar
- Dale Reid - Ladybank, Scotland
- Pam Wright - Torphins, Scotland

United States

- Kathy Whitworth (Captain) - Monahans, Texas
- Pat Bradley - Westford, Massachusetts
- Beth Daniel - Charleston, South Carolina
- Cathy Gerring - Fort Wayne, Indiana
- Rosie Jones - Santa Ana, California
- Betsy King - Reading, Pennsylvania
- Nancy Lopez - Torrance, California
- Dottie Mochrie - Saratoga Springs, New York
- Patty Sheehan - Middlebury, Vermont

== Format ==
A total of 16 points were available. Day 1 was four rounds of foursomes. Day 2 was four rounds of fourball matches. The final 8 points were decided in a round of singles matchplay. All eight golfers from each team played on each day.

== Day one foursomes ==
Friday, November 16, 1990

	Results
Davies/Nicholas	(Europe) 2 & 1	Bradley/Lopez
Wright/Neumann	(United States) 6 & 5	Gerring/Mochrie
Reid/Alfredsson	(United States) 6 & 5	Sheehan/Jones
Johnson/de Lorenzi	(United States) 5 & 4	King/Daniel
1	Session	3
1	Overall	3

== Day two fourball ==
Saturday, November 17, 1990

	Results
Davies/Nicholas	(United States) 4 & 3	King/Daniel
Wright/Neumann	(Europe) 4 & 2	Gerring/Mochrie
Johnson/de Lorenzi	(United States) 2 & 1	Sheehan/Jones
Reid/Alfredsson	(United States) 2 & 1	Bradley/Lopez
1	Session	3
2	Overall	6

== Day three singles ==
Sunday, November 18, 1990

	Results
Trish Johnson	(United States) 8 & 7	Pat Bradley
Liselotte Neumann	(United States) 7 & 6	Beth Daniel
Alison Nicholas	(United States) 6 & 4	Nancy Lopez
Helen Alfredsson	(United States) 4 & 3	Cathy Gerring
Marie-Laure de Lorenzi	(United States) 4 & 2	Dottie Mochrie
Laura Davies	(Europe) 3 & 2	Rosie Jones
Dale Reid	(Europe) 2 & 1	Patty Sheehan
Pam Wright	halved	Betsy King
2 1/2	Session	5 1/2
4 1/2	Overall	11 1/2
