= Tu Ai-yu =

Taiwanese professional golfer (born 1954)

Tu Ai-yu 涂阿玉
Personal information
- Nationality: Chinese Taipei
- Born: 29 September 1954 (age 72) Fengyuan, Taichung County, Taiwan
- Height: 1.68 m (5 ft 6 in)

Career
- Sport: Golf
- Turned professional: 1974
- Former tours: LPGA of Japan Tour; LPGA Tour
- Professional wins: 70

Number of wins by tour
- LPGA Tour: 1
- LPGA of Japan Tour: 69
- Other: 1

Best results in LPGA major championships
- Chevron Championship: DNP
- Women's PGA C'ship: T15: 1978
- U.S. Women's Open: T23: 1976, 1980
- du Maurier Classic: DNP

Achievements and awards
- LPGA of Japan Tour Player of the Year: 1991
- LPGA of Japan Tour leading money winner: 1982, 1983, 1984, 1985, 1986, 1989, 1991

Tu Ai-yu (Chinese: 涂阿玉; pinyin: Tú ā-yù, born 29 September 1954) is a Taiwanese professional golfer who played on the LPGA of Japan Tour (JLPGA) and the LPGA Tour.

== Career ==
Tu won 71 times on the LPGA of Japan Tour between 1974 and 2002, 11 times before becoming a member in 1981, and 58 times afterward. She was the leading money winner on the LPGA of Japan Tour seven times (1982, 1983, 1984, 1985, 1986, 1989, 1991).

One of Tu's JLPGA wins was co-sanctioned with the LPGA Tour, the 1986 Mazda Japan Classic.

Tu won the LPGA Tour's qualifying school tournament in January 1976 and played on the LPGA Tour from 1976 to 1981. Her 1986 win was as a non-member.

== Professional wins (70) ==
=== LPGA of Japan Tour (69) ===
- 1974 (1) Tokai Classic
- 1975 (1) Hiroshima Women's Open
- 1976 (2) Hiroshima Women's Open, Toyotomi Ladies
- 1977 (2) Chinese Women's Open, Hiroshima Women's Open
- 1978 (1) Tokai Classic
- 1979 (3) Lake Suwa Women's Open, Sanyo Queens, **JLPGA Lady Borden Cup**
- 1980 (1) Junon Women's Open
- 1981 (1) Lake Suwa Women's Open
- 1982 (9) Mitsukoshi Ladies Open, Nasu Ogawa Ladies, World Ladies Golf Tournament, Mitsubishi Fanta Database Ladies, Hokkaido Women's Open, Lady Isuzu Cup, Miyagi TV Cup Ladies Open, **JLPGA Lady Borden Cup**, Sanyo Queens
- 1983 (9) Mizuno Golf, Dunlop Ladies Open, **Japan Women's Open**, Kumamoto Cyuoh Ladies, Sanin Ladies, Hokuriku Queens, Tsumura Itsuki Classic, **JLPGA Lady Borden Cup**, Saikai National Park Ladies Open
- 1984 (7) Okinawa Makiminato Ladies, Uniden Hiroshima Women's Open, Sanin Ladies, Mitsubishi Fanta Database Ladies, Takara Shuzo Invitational, Kosaido Asahi Golf Cup, Sanyo Queens
- 1985 (7) Tokushima Tsukinomiya Ladies Open, Nasu Ogawa Ladies, Roku Konishi Cup World Ladies, Junon Women's Open, Fujisankei Ladies Classic, Itoen Ladies, **Japan LPGA Championship**
- 1986 (9) Kibun Ladies Classic, Yamaha Cup Ladies, Nasu Ogawa Ladies, Yakult Mirumiru Ladies, Sanin Ladies, **Japan Women's Open**, Hokkaido Women's Open, Mazda Japan Classic (co-sanctioned with LPGA Tour), Saikai National Park Ladies Open
- 1987 (1) Hokkaido Women's Open
- 1988 (2) Marukoh Cyuoh Ladies, Qtai Queens
- 1989 (5) Tohato Ladies, Nasu Ogawa Ladies, Toyo Suisan Ladies Open, Itoen Ladies, Kosaido Asahi Golf Cup
- 1990 (1) Kibun Ladies Classic
- 1991 (2) Toto Motors Ladies, **Japan Women's Open**
- 1992 (3) Yamaha Cup Ladies, Yonex Ladies Open, Karasuyamajo-Itsuki Classic
- 1993 (1) Tohato Ladies
- 2002 (1) Saishunkan Ladies Hinokuni Open

Tournament in bold denotes major championships in LPGA of Japan Tour.

=== LPGA Tour (1) ===
No.	Date	Tournament	Winning score	Margin of victory	Runners-up
1	8 Nov 1986	Mazda Japan Classic	−3 (68-69-76=213)	Playoff	(United States) Cathy Gerring (United States) Becky Pearson (United States) Mary Beth Zimmerman

LPGA Tour playoff record (1–0)

No.	Year	Tournament	Opponents	Result
1	1986	Mazda Japan Classic	(United States) Cathy Gerring (United States) Becky Pearson (United States) Mary Beth Zimmerman	Won with bogey on fourth extra hole Pearson and Zimmerman eliminated by birdie on first hole

=== Legends Tour (1) ===
- 2005 World Ladies Senior Open
