= Becky Pearson =

American professional golfer (born 1956)

Personal information
- Nationality: United States
- Born: January 22, 1956 (age 70)
- Height: 5 ft 6 in (1.68 m)

Career
- Sport: Golf
- College: Florida International University
- Status: Professional
- Former tour: LPGA Tour
- Professional wins: 1

Number of wins by tour
- LPGA Tour: 1

Best results in LPGA major championships
- Chevron Championship: T10: 1986
- Women's PGA C'ship: T20: 1984
- U.S. Women's Open: T21: 1983
- du Maurier Classic: T31: 1987

Becky Pearson (born January 22, 1956) is an American professional golfer who played on the LPGA Tour.

== Career ==
In 1956, Pearson was born. She won the Minnesota Junior Girls State Championship twice. While living in North Branch, Minnesota, she reached the quarter-finals at the United States Girls' Junior Golf Championship in 1973 after defeating defending champion Nancy Lopez in the second round.

Pearson earned All-American honors twice while attending Florida International University and was the runner-up to Lori Castillo at the 1979 U.S. Women's Amateur Public Links.

Pearson won once on the LPGA Tour at the 1986 Chrysler-Plymouth Classic.

== Awards and honors ==
In 2008, Pearson earned a Women in History Award from the North Chisago Historical Society.

== Professional wins (1) ==
=== LPGA Tour wins (1) ===
No.	Date	Tournament	Winning score	Margin of Victory	Runners-up
1	May 18, 1986	Chrysler-Plymouth Classic	–7 (71-70-71=212)	1 stroke	(United States) Betsy King (United States) Deb Richard

LPGA Tour playoff record (0–1)

No.	Year	Tournament	Opponents	Result
1	1986	Mazda Japan Classic	(United States) Cathy Gerring (Taiwan) Ai-Yu Tu (United States) Mary Beth Zimmerman	Tu won with bogey on fourth extra hole Pearson and Zimmerman eliminated by birdie on first hole
