= 1981 U.S. Women's Open =

Coordinates: 41.801°N 87.881°W

Tournament information
- Dates: July 23–26, 1981
- Location: LaGrange, Illinois
- Course: La Grange Country Club
- Organized by: USGA
- Tour: LPGA Tour

Statistics
- Par: 72
- Length: 6,204 yards (5,673 m)
- Field: 150 players, 70 after cut
- Cut: 153 (+9)
- Prize fund: $150,000
- Winner's share: $22,000

Champion
- (United States) Pat Bradley
- 279 (−9)

Location in the United States
Location in Illinois

The 1981 U.S. Women's Open was the 36th U.S. Women's Open, held July 23–26 at La Grange Country Club in LaGrange, Illinois, a suburb west of Chicago.

Three strokes back after 54 holes, Pat Bradley shot a final round 66 (−6) to win her only U.S. Women's Open, one stroke ahead of runner-up Beth Daniel. It was the second of Bradley's six major titles.

Kathy Whitworth had her best chance to win the U.S. Women's Open, the only major championship to elude her. She co-led after 18 and 36 holes, and led by a stroke over Bonnie Lauer after the third round. Both faded on Sunday as Whitworth carded a 74 (+2) to finish five strokes back in solo third. With that, she became the first to exceed one million dollars in career earnings on the LPGA Tour.

The course hosted the championship seven years earlier in 1974.

== Final leaderboard ==
Sunday, July 26, 1981

Place	Player	Score	To par	Money ($)
1	(United States) Pat Bradley	71-74-68-66=279	−9	22,000
2	(United States) Beth Daniel	69-74-69-68=280	−8	12,500
3	(United States) Kathy Whitworth	69-70-71-74=284	−4	9,500
T4	(United States) Bonnie Lauer	72-67-72-76=287	−1	7,000
T4	(United States) Cindy Hill	76-70-69-72=287	−1	7,000
T6	(United States) Donna Caponi	71-74-72-73=290	+2	4,562
T6	(United States) JoAnne Carner	73-71-72-74=290	+2	4,562
T6	(United States) Marlene Floyd	71-72-73-74=290	+2	4,562
T6	(United States) Patty Sheehan	74-74-72-70=290	+2	4,562
T10	(United States) Amelia Rorer	73-77-69-73=292	+4	2,967
T10	(United States) Debbie Massey	71-72-72-77=292	+4	2,967
T10	(United States) Hollis Stacy	73-75-71-73=292	+4	2,967
T10	(South Africa) Sally Little	74-72-76-70=292	+4	2,967
T10	(United States) Sandra Haynie	75-73-73-71=292	+4	2,967
T10	(United States) Shelley Hamlin	70-75-75-72=292	+4	2,967
