= Emilee Klein =

American professional golfer and coach (born 1974)

Personal information
- Nationality: United States
- Born: June 11, 1974 (age 52) Santa Monica, California, U.S.
- Height: 5 ft 4 in (1.63 m)

Career
- Sport: Golf
- College: Arizona State University
- Turned professional: 1994
- Former tour: LPGA Tour (1995–2005)
- Professional wins: 3

Number of wins by tour
- LPGA Tour: 3
- Ladies European Tour: 1

Best results in LPGA major championships
- Chevron Championship: T24: 1998
- Women's PGA C'ship: T6: 1998
- U.S. Women's Open: T16: 2001
- du Maurier Classic: T7: 1997
- Women's British Open: T21: 2001

Emilee Klein (born June 11, 1974) is an American professional golfer and college golf coach who played on the LPGA Tour.

Klein was born in Santa Monica, California and grew up in Sherman Oaks, California, where she attended Notre Dame High School. She had a successful amateur career winning several tournaments including the 1991 U.S. Girls' Junior. She played college golf at Arizona State University and won the 1994 NCAA Division I Championship as well as being on the winning team in 1993 and 1994. She was a member of the U.S. Curtis Cup team in 1994.

Klein qualified for the LPGA Tour in the LPGA Final Qualifying Tournament in 1994. She won three times on the LPGA Tour between 1996 and 2001. She was a member of the 2002 Solheim Cup team.

Since retiring from the LPGA Tour, Klein has been head golf coach at University of Central Florida (2005–2009), San Diego State University (2009–2011), and University of Tulsa (2014–present). Klein resigned from her position as head golf coach at San Diego State University in May 2011 to begin a career in the insurance industry. Klein became an insurance agent for State Farms Insurance in Beverly Hills, California, in June 2011. She was announced as the women's golf head coach at University of Tulsa on June 20, 2014.

== Amateur wins ==
- 1988 California Women's Amateur Championship
- 1991 U.S. Girls' Junior
- 1992 AJGA Tournament of Champions
- 1993 Broadmoor Invitational, North and South Amateur
- 1994 NCAA Division I Championship

== Professional wins ==
=== LPGA Tour (3) ===
No.	Date	Tournament	Winning score	Margin of victory	Runner(s)-up
1	Aug 11, 1996	PING/Welch's Championship (Boston)	−15 (71-69-68-65=273)	2 strokes	(Australia) Karrie Webb
2	Aug 18, 1996	Women's British Open	−15 (68-66-71-72=277)	7 strokes	(United States) Amy Alcott (United States) Penny Hammel
3	Jul 15, 2001	Michelob Light Classic	−11 (64-72-69=205)	6 strokes	(Sweden) Annika Sörenstam

Note: Klein won the Weetabix Women's British Open before it became recognized as a major championship by the LPGA Tour in 2001.

LPGA Tour playoff record (0–2)

No.	Year	Tournament	Opponent(s)	Result
1	1995	State Farm Rail Classic	(United States) Mary Beth Zimmerman	Lost to birdie on second extra hole
2	1997	Diet Dr Pepper National Pro-Am	(United States) Kelly Robbins	Lost to par on second extra hole

=== Ladies European Tour (1) ===
- 1996 (1) Weetabix Women's British Open (co-sanctioned by the LPGA Tour)

== Team appearances ==
Amateur

- Curtis Cup (representing the United States): 1994 (tie)

Professional

- Solheim Cup (representing the United States): 2002 (winners)
