= Bonnie Lauer =

American professional golfer (born 1951)

Personal information
- Nationality: United States
- Born: February 20, 1951 (age 75)
- Height: 5 ft 5 in (1.65 m)

Career
- Sport: Golf
- College: Michigan State University
- Turned professional: 1975
- Former tour: LPGA Tour (1975–1991)
- Professional wins: 2

Number of wins by tour
- LPGA Tour: 2

Best results in LPGA major championships
- Chevron Championship: T25: 1988
- Women's PGA C'ship: T12: 1985
- U.S. Women's Open: T4: 1981
- du Maurier Classic: T11: 1987
- Women's British Open: DNP

Achievements and awards
- LPGA Rookie of the Year: 1976

Bonnie Lauer (born February 20, 1951) is an American professional golfer. She is currently retired from the LPGA Tour.

== Early life and amateur career ==
Lauer was born in 1951. In 1973, Lauer graduated cum laude from Michigan State University. She won the national individual intercollegiate golf championship her senior year.

== Professional career ==
Lauer turned professional in 1975. She won the LPGA Rookie of the Year award in 1976.

Lauer had individual victories in both 1977 and 1985. She had her best finish in a major championship at the 1981 U.S. Women's Open where she finished T-4 after being tied for the lead after 36 holes.

Lauer was the President of the LPGA in 1988.

== Awards and honors ==
In 1976, she won the LPGA Rookie of the Year award.

== Professional wins ==
=== LPGA Tour wins (2) ===
No.	Date	Tournament	Winning score	Margin of victory	Runner-up
1	Aug 28, 1977	Patty Berg Classic	–7 (70-75-67=212)	2 strokes	(United States) Laura Baugh
2	Mar 10, 1985	Uniden LPGA Invitational	–11 (70-71-68-68=277)	5 strokes	(United States) Alice Miller

LPGA Tour playoff record (0–1)

No.	Year	Tournament	Opponents	Result
1	1976	Girl Talk Classic	(United States) Pat Bradley (Canada) Sandra Post (United States) Judy Rankin	Bradley won with par on second extra hole Lauer and Post eliminated by birdie on first hole

== Team appearances ==
Amateur

- Curtis Cup (representing the United States): 1974 (winners)
