= 1996 Solheim Cup =

Women's team golf competition

- Dates: 20–22 September 1996
- Venue: St. Pierre Hotel & Country Club
- Location: Chepstow, Wales
- Captains: Mickey Walker (Europe); Judy Rankin (USA)
(Europe)	11	17	(United States)
- United States wins the Solheim Cup

Location map
- Location within Europe Location within Wales

The fourth Solheim Cup took place from 20 September to 22 September 1996 at St. Pierre Hotel & Country Club, Chepstow, Wales. The United States team retained the cup beating the European team by 17 points to 11.

== Teams ==
Europe

- Mickey Walker (Captain) - England
- Helen Alfredsson - Gothenburg, Sweden
- Laura Davies - Coventry, England
- Marie-Laure de Lorenzi - Biarritz, France
- Lisa Hackney - England
- Trish Johnson - Bristol, England
- Kathryn Marshall - Dundee, Scotland
- Joanne Morley - Sale, England
- Liselotte Neumann - Finspang, Sweden
- (England) Alison Nicholas - Gibraltar
- Catrin Nilsmark - Gothenburg, Sweden
- Dale Reid - Ladybank, Scotland
- Annika Sörenstam - Stockholm, Sweden

United States

- Judy Rankin (Captain) - St Louis, Missouri
- Pat Bradley - Westford, Massachusetts
- Brandie Burton - San Bernardino, California
- Beth Daniel - Charleston, South Carolina
- Jane Geddes - Huntington, New York
- Rosie Jones - Santa Ana, California
- Betsy King - Reading, Pennsylvania
- Meg Mallon - Natick, Massachusetts
- Michelle McGann - West Palm Beach, Florida
- Dottie Pepper - Saratoga Springs, New York
- Kelly Robbins - Mt. Pleasant, Michigan
- Patty Sheehan - Middlebury, Vermont
- Val Skinner - Hamilton, Montana

== Format ==
A total of 28 points were available, divided among four periods of team play, followed by one period of singles play. The first period, on Friday morning, was four rounds of foursomes. This was followed in the afternoon by four rounds of fourballs. This schedule was repeated on the Saturday morning and afternoon. The four periods on Friday and Saturday accounted for 16 points. During these team periods, the players played in teams of two. The final 12 points were decided in a round of singles matchplay, in which all 24 players (12 from each team) took part.

== Day one ==
Friday, 20 September 1996

=== Morning foursomes ===
	Results
Sörenstam/Nilsmark	halved	Robbins/McGann
Davies/Nicholas	(United States) 1 up	Sheehan/Jones
Reid/de Lorenzi	(United States) 1 up	Daniel/Skinner
Alfredsson/Neumann	(United States) 2 & 1	Pepper/Burton
1/2	Session	3 1/2
1/2	Overall	3 1/2

=== Afternoon fourball ===
	Results
Davies/Johnson	(Europe) 6 & 5	Robbins/Bradley
Sörenstam/Marshall	(Europe) 1 up	Skinner/Geddes
Neumann/Nilsmark	(United States) 1 up	Pepper/King
Alfredsson/Nicholas	halved	Mallon/Daniel
2 1/2	Session	1 1/2
3	Overall	5

== Day two ==
Saturday, 21 September 1996

=== Morning foursomes ===
	Results
Davies/Johnson	(Europe) 4 & 3	Sheehan/Jones
Sörenstam/Nilsmark	(Europe) 1 up	Pepper/Burton
Neumann/Marshall	halved	Mallon/Geddes
Alfredsson/de Lorenzi	(Europe) 4 & 3	Robbins/McGann
3 1/2	Session	1/2
6 1/2	Overall	5 1/2

=== Afternoon fourball ===
	Results
Davies/Hackney	(Europe) 6 & 5	Daniel/Skinner
Sörenstam/Johnson	halved	Mallon/McGann
de Lorenzi/Morley	(United States) 2 & 1	Robbins/King
Nilsmark/Neumann	(Europe) 3 & 1	Sheehan/Geddes
2 1/2	Session	1 1/2
9	Overall	7

== Day three ==
Sunday, 22 September 1996

=== Singles ===
	Results
Annika Sörenstam	(Europe) 2 & 1	Pat Bradley
Kathryn Marshall	(United States) 2 & 1	Val Skinner
Laura Davies	(United States) 3 & 2	Michelle McGann
Liselotte Neumann	halved	Beth Daniel
Lisa Hackney	(United States) 1 up	Brandie Burton
Trish Johnson	(United States) 3 & 2	Dottie Pepper
Alison Nicholas	halved	Kelly Robbins
Marie-Laure de Lorenzi	(United States) 5 & 4	Betsy King
Joanne Morley	(United States) 5 & 4	Rosie Jones
Dale Reid	(United States) 2 up	Jane Geddes
Catrin Nilsmark	(United States) 2 & 1	Patty Sheehan
Helen Alfredsson	(United States) 4 & 2	Meg Mallon
2	Session	10
11	Overall	17
