= Susie McAllister =

American professional golfer (born 1947)

Personal information
- Full name: Mary H. McAllister
- Nationality: United States
- Born: August 27, 1947 (age 79) Beaumont, Texas, U.S.
- Height: 5 ft 8 in (1.73 m)
- Spouse: Gary Morton

Career
- Sport: Golf
- College: Lamar University
- Turned professional: 1971
- Former tour: LPGA Tour
- Professional wins: 1

Number of wins by tour
- LPGA Tour: 1

Best results in LPGA major championships
- Chevron Championship: T20: 1983
- Women's PGA C'ship: T12: 1976
- U.S. Women's Open: 4th: 1976
- du Maurier Classic: T33: 1982

Mary H. "Susie" McAllister (born August 27, 1947) is an American professional golfer who played on the LPGA Tour.

McAllister won once on the LPGA Tour in 1975.

She was married to comedian Gary Morton from 1996 until his death in 1999.

== Professional wins ==
=== LPGA Tour wins (1) ===
No.	Date	Tournament	Winning score	Margin of victory	Runner-up
1	Jul 6, 1975	Wheeling Ladies Classic	−4 (72-70-70=212)	1 stroke	(United States) Jan Ferraris

LPGA Tour playoff record (0–1)

No.	Year	Tournament	Opponents	Result
1	1981	West Virginia Bank Classic	(United States) Kathy Postlewait (Australia) Penny Pulz (United States) Alice Ritzman (United States) Hollis Stacy	Stacy won with birdie on first extra hole
