= Gary Morton =

American comedian (1924–1999)

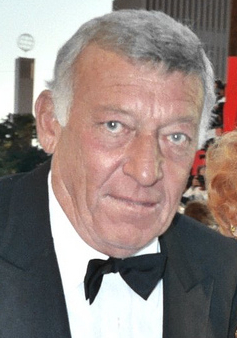
- Morton at the 61st Academy Awards in 1989
- Born: Morton Gary Goldaper; December 19, 1924; New York City, U.S.
- Died: March 30, 1999 (aged 74); Palm Springs, California, U.S.
- Occupation(s): Actor, comedian, producer
- Years active: 1965–1990
- Spouses: Susan Morrow (m. 1953; ann. 1957) Lucille Ball (m. 1961; died 1989) Susie McAllister (m. 1996)

Gary Morton (born Morton Gary Goldaper; December 19, 1924 – March 30, 1999) was an American stand-up comedian whose primary venues were hotels and resorts of the Borscht Belt in upstate New York. He was born in New York City, the son of Morris Goldaper and Rose Greenfeder Goldaper, and had a sister, Helen. Later, he was a producer and studio executive, in association with his second wife, Lucille Ball.

== Personal life ==
Morton married actress Susan Morrow on December 17, 1953. They separated in August 1954 and the marriage was annulled in Los Angeles on July 11, 1957.

In 1960, Morton met Lucille Ball in New York City a few months before she opened on Broadway in the musical Wildcat. Morton said he was always busy working nights and had therefore not seen the popular series I Love Lucy. They were married on November 19, 1961, at the Marble Collegiate Church in New York City by Dr. Norman Vincent Peale. Morton, 13 years younger than Ball, signed a prenuptial agreement to stifle rumors that he was a gold digger.

Morton became closely involved in the management of his wife's career, from the time of their marriage in 1961 throughout the remainder of her career. During Ball's solo years as the titular head of Desilu Productions, Morton and his brother-in-law, Fred Ball, served on the studio's board of directors in various capacities.

Later, Morton's effectiveness in his duties came under some scrutiny and criticism. Most notable of these denouncements came from Herbert F. Solow and Robert H. Justman, whose dealings with Morton during the production of the original Star Trek television series are documented in their 1996 book Inside Star Trek: The Real Story. Others, including Grant Tinker, came forward with their own recollections of Morton's tenure at Desilu.

Most critics cite Morton's construction of a "European Street"—a 3/4-scale replica of a European-styled business district street—as being a wasteful use of studio funds at a time when frugality was a necessity. According to Desilu and Paramount financial records, and as reported by Solow and Justman, not one television or theatrical production was filmed on this set before it was demolished in 1977.

After the sale of Desilu to Gulf+Western in 1967, Morton helped Ball form Lucille Ball Productions to allow her to have more of a free hand in television production. Morton served as executive producer of Ball's third series Here's Lucy (1968–1974) and was a co-executive producer of her ill-fated 1986 series Life with Lucy. Aside from producing tasks, he warmed up Ball's audiences before her entrance. He also played bit parts in Ball's various series and acted occasionally in films. He played the fictional Borscht Belt comedian Sherman Hart in Lenny (1974). On February 15, 1983, Ball and Morton launched a film-and-television partnership with film studio 20th Century-Fox, where Fox gave Ball access to theatrical films, plays, made-for-television movies, a 20-hour mini-series and a sitcom.

Morton was married to Ball until her death in 1989. In 1996, Morton married Susie McAllister. On March 30, 1999, he died of lung cancer at the age of 74 in Palm Springs, California.
