= Crestar-Farm Fresh Classic =

Golf tournament formerly on the LPGA Tour

The Crestar-Farm Fresh Classic was a golf tournament on the LPGA Tour from 1979 to 1992. It was played at three different courses in Hampton Roads area of Virginia.

== Tournament locations ==
Year	Venue	Location
1979–1980	Elizabeth Manor Golf & Country Club	Portsmouth, Virginia
1981–1988	Sleepy Hole Golf Course	Suffolk, Virginia
1989–1992	Greenbrier Country Club	Chesapeake, Virginia

== Winners ==
Year	Dates	Champion	Country	Score	To par	Margin of victory	Venue	Purse ($)	Winner's share
Crestar-Farm Fresh Classic
1992	May 8–10	Jennifer Wyatt	Canada	70-68-70=208	−8	3 strokes	Greenbrier Country Club	425,000	63,750
1991	May 9–12	Hollis Stacy	United States	70-71-72-69=282	−6	1 stroke	Greenbrier Country Club	400,000	60,000
Crestar Classic
1990	May 11–13	Dottie Mochrie	United States	67-65-68=200	−16	9 strokes	Greenbrier Country Club	350,000	52,500
1989	May 5–7	Juli Inkster (2)	United States	69-72-69=210	−6	5 strokes	Greenbrier Country Club	300,000	45,000
1988	May 6–8	Juli Inkster	United States	70-70-69=209	−7	Playoff	Sleepy Hole Golf Course	300,000	45,000
United Virginia Bank Golf Classic
1987	May 8–10	Jody Rosenthal	United States	71-72-66=209	−7	1 stroke	Sleepy Hole Golf Course	250,000	37,500
United Virginia Bank Classic
1986	May 9–11	Muffin Spencer-Devlin	United States	76-69-69=214	−2	1 stroke	Sleepy Hole Golf Course	250,000	37,500
1985	May 10–12	Kathy Whitworth	United States	69-66-72=207	−9	1 stroke	Sleepy Hole Golf Course	200,000	30,000
1984	May 11–13	Amy Alcott (2)	United States	71-70-69=210	−6	2 strokes	Sleepy Hole Golf Course	175,000	26,250
1983	May 13–15	Lenore Muraoka	United States	70-73-69=212	−4	3 strokes	Sleepy Hole Golf Course	150,000	22,500
1982	May 7–9	Sally Little	South Africa	72-69-67=208	−11	Playoff	Sleepy Hole Golf Course	125,000	18,750
1981	Sep 11–13	Jan Stephenson	Australia	66-71-68=205	−14	3 strokes	Sleepy Hole Golf Course	125,000	18,750
1980	Sep 11–14	Donna Caponi	United States	70-67-66-74=277	−11	4 strokes	Elizabeth Manor Golf & Country Club	100,000	15,000
1979	Oct 11–14	Amy Alcott	United States	70-70-73-73=286	−2	1 stroke	Elizabeth Manor Golf & Country Club	100,000	15,000

== Multiple winners ==
Two players have won this tournament more than once.

- 2 wins
  - Amy Alcott: 1979, 1984
  - Juli Inkster: 1988, 1989
