= 1986 LPGA Championship =

LPGA Championship

Coordinates: 39.349°N 84.278°W

Tournament information
- Dates: May 29 – June 1, 1986
- Location: Mason, Ohio
- Courses: Jack Nicklaus Golf Center; Grizzly Course
- Tour: LPGA Tour
- Format: Stroke play - 72 holes

Statistics
- Par: 72
- Length: 6,242 yards (5,708 m)
- Cut: 148 (+4)
- Prize fund: $300,000
- Winner's share: $45,000

Champion
- (United States) Pat Bradley
- 277 (−11)

Location in the United States
Location in Ohio

The 1986 LPGA Championship was held May 29 to June 1 at Jack Nicklaus Golf Center at Kings Island in Mason, Ohio, a suburb northeast of Cincinnati. Played on the Grizzly Course, this was the 32nd edition of the LPGA Championship.

Entering the final round four strokes behind, Pat Bradley birdied the last hole for a 68 to win by a stroke over runner-up Patty Sheehan. It was the fifth of her six major championships, the second of three in 1986, and completed the career grand slam. With the win, Bradley became the first to surpass $2 million in earnings on the LPGA Tour.

Defending champion Nancy Lopez did not compete; she gave birth to her second daughter a few days earlier.

== Final leaderboard ==
Sunday, June 1, 1986

Place	Player	Score	To par	Money ($)
1	(United States) Pat Bradley	67-72-70-68=277	−11	45,000
2	(United States) Patty Sheehan	72-70-69-67=278	−10	27,750
T3	(United States) Juli Inkster	70-72-68-69=279	−9	18,000
T3	(Japan) Ayako Okamoto	66-70-69-74=279	−9	18,000
5	(United States) Muffin Spencer-Devlin	72-67-74-68=281	−7	12,750
6	(United States) Cindy Mackey	70-70-68-74=282	−6	10,500
7	(United States) Myra Blackwelder	71-71-71-70=283	−5	8,850
8	(Australia) Penny Pulz	71-71-70-72=284	−4	7,800
T9	(United States) Sharon Barrett	72-70-69-74=285	−3	6,353
T9	(United States) Connie Chillemi	68-74-75-68=285	−3	6,353
T9	(United States) Lori Garbacz	65-74-74-72=285	−3	6,353
