= Jane Geddes =

American professional golfer (born 1960)

Personal information
- Nationality: United States
- Born: February 5, 1960 (age 66) Huntington, New York, U.S.
- Height: 5 ft 5 in (1.65 m)
- Life partner: Gigi Fernández
- Children: 2

Career
- Sport: Golf
- College: Florida State University
- Turned professional: 1983
- Former tour: LPGA Tour (1983–2003)
- Professional wins: 15

Number of wins by tour
- LPGA Tour: 11
- Ladies European Tour: 1
- LPGA of Japan Tour: 1
- WPGA Tour of Australasia: 2

Best results in LPGA major championships (wins: 2)
- Chevron Championship: T5: 1986
- Women's PGA C'ship: Won: 1987
- U.S. Women's Open: Won: 1986
- du Maurier Classic: 2nd: 1985
- Women's British Open: T18: 2002

Jane Geddes (born February 5, 1960) is an American retired professional golfer. She joined the LPGA Tour in 1983 and won two major championships and 11 LPGA Tour events overall. Geddes was the Vice President of Talent Relations of WWE.

== Career ==
Geddes was born in Huntington, New York. She played college golf at Florida State University and was a member of the school's national championship team in 1981. She joined the LPGA Tour in 1983, posting runner-up finishes three times from 1984 to 1985.

Geddes broke through for her first professional victory when she won the 1986 U.S. Women's Open by defeating Sally Little in an 18-hole playoff. Then she won again the very next week. The year 1987 was her best, as she posted five victories, including the Mazda LPGA Championship, and four second-place finishes, finishing third on the money list. In all, seven of Geddes' 11 career wins came from 1986 to 1987.

Geddes won twice in 1991 and her last win was at the 1994 Chicago Challenge. Geddes finished in the top-20 on the money list nine times, and posted 14 top-10 finishes in majors in addition to her two major championship wins. In 2000, she was recognized during the LPGA's 50th Anniversary in 2000 as one of the LPGA's top-50 players and teachers. She retired from the LPGA Tour following the 2003 season.

Geddes co-founded an Internet e-commerce company named Planesia, which she sold in 2001. She received a degree in criminology from the University of South Florida in 2003, and later received a Juris Doctor degree from Stetson University College of Law in Florida. She also served as assistant captain of the U.S. Solheim Cup team in 2002 and 2003. In January 2007, she joined the LPGA Tour as Senior Director of Tournament Business Affairs. She was later promoted to vice-president of Competition. In 2009, she was promoted again to Senior Vice President of Tournament Operations and Players Services.

In September 2011, Geddes left the LPGA to become VP of Talent Relations for World Wrestling Entertainment. On March 4, 2015, it was reported that Geddes had parted ways with the WWE.

In April 2017, Geddes was named CEO of Executive Women's Golf Association (EWGA), a Florida not-for-profit corporation whose mission is to connect women to learn, play and enjoy golf for business and for fun. The EWGA was acquired by the LPGA and she became the executive director of the LPGA Amateur Golf Association.

From 2016 to 2019 she served as the executive director of the International Association of Golf Administrators.

In 2019 she left both positions in the LPGA Amateur Golf Association and International Association of Golf Administrators.

== Personal life ==
She currently resides near Stamford, Connecticut, with her partner, former professional tennis player Gigi Fernández, and their twins, Karson Xavier and Madison Jane.

== Professional wins (15) ==
=== LPGA Tour wins (11) ===
Legend
LPGA Tour major championships (2)
Other LPGA Tour (9)

No.	Date	Tournament	Winning score	Margin of victory	Runner(s)-up
1	Jul 14, 1986	U.S. Women's Open	−1 (74-74-70-69=287)	Playoff	(United States) Sally Little
2	Jul 20, 1986	Boston Five Classic	−7 (71-70-72-68=281)	1 stroke	(United States) Deb Richard
3	Mar 1, 1987	Women's Kemper Open	−12 (67-70-69-70=276)	Playoff	(United States) Cathy Gerring
4	Mar 8, 1987	GNA/Glendale Federal Classic	−2 (74-74-71-67=286)	Playoff	(United States) Robin Walton
5	May 24, 1987	Mazda LPGA Championship	−13 (72-68-68-67=275)	1 stroke	(United States) Betsy King
6	Jul 5, 1987	Jamie Farr Toledo Classic	−8 (71-73-69-67=280)	2 strokes	(United States) Jill Briles-Hinton (United States) Nancy Taylor
7	Jul 19, 1987	Boston Five Classic	−11 (73-70-67-67=277)	1 stroke	(United States) Jody Rosenthal (United States) Donna White
8	Jan 20, 1991	The Jamaica Classic	−6 (71-72-64=207)	3 strokes	(United States) Patty Sheehan
9	Jun 9, 1991	Atlantic City Classic	−8 (71-68-69=208)	1 stroke	(United States) Amy Alcott (United States) Cindy Schreyer
10	Jun 6, 1993	Oldsmobile Classic	−11 (72-68-68-69=277)	1 stroke	(United States) Tammie Green (England) Trish Johnson (United States) Alice Ritzman
11	Aug 21, 1994	Chicago Challenge	−16 (68-69-68-67=272)	3 strokes	(United States) Dale Eggeling (United States) Robin Walton

LPGA Tour playoff record (3–2)

No.	Year	Tournament	Opponent(s)	Result
1	1986	U.S. Women's Open	(United States) Sally Little	Won 18-hole playoff (Geddes:71, Little:73)
2	1987	Women's Kemper Open	(United States) Cathy Gerring	Won with bogey on first extra hole
3	1987	GNA/Glendale Federal Classic	(United States) Robin Walton	Won with birdie on first extra hole
4	1991	The Phar-Mor in Youngstown	(United States) Deb Richard	Lost to birdie on first extra hole
5	1996	HealthSouth Inaugural	(United States) Martha Nause (Australia) Karrie Webb	Webb won with par on fourth extra hole Nause eliminated by par on first hole

=== Ladies European Tour wins (1) ===
- 1989 Weetabix Women's British Open

Note: Geddes won the Women's British Open once before it became co-sanctioned by the LPGA Tour in 1994 and recognized as a major championship by the LPGA Tour in 2001.

=== LPGA of Japan Tour wins (1) ===
- 1987 Treasure Invitational

=== ALPG Tour wins (2) ===
- 1990 Daikyo Australian Ladies Masters
- 1991 Daikyo Australian Ladies Masters

== Major championships ==
=== Wins (2) ===
Year	Championship	Winning score	Margin	Runner-up
1986	U.S. Women's Open	−1 (74-74-70-69=287)	Playoff^{1}	(United States) Sally Little
1987	Mazda LPGA Championship	−13 (72-68-68-67=275)	1 stroke	(United States) Betsy King

^{1} In an 18-hole playoff, Geddes 71, Little 73.

=== Results timeline ===
Tournament	1984	1985	1986	1987	1988	1989
Kraft Nabisco Championship		T7	T5	T8	T7	T58
LPGA Championship	T33	T49	T61	1	T9	6
U.S. Women's Open		T8	1	WD	T41	T9
du Maurier Classic	T28	2	T14	T8	CUT	T10

Tournament	1990	1991	1992	1993	1994	1995	1996	1997	1998	1999	2000
Kraft Nabisco Championship	T34	T17	T17	T49	T19	T27	T23	T11	T33	T33	T27
LPGA Championship	T36	T15	T22	T17	CUT	T29	T26	T67	T11	CUT	T17
U.S. Women's Open	T19	T28	T9	T50	T35	T40	T3	WD	CUT	CUT	
du Maurier Classic	T10	T15	T25	CUT	T4	T5	T56	T11	CUT		CUT

Tournament	2001	2002	2003	2004	2005
Kraft Nabisco Championship					
LPGA Championship	CUT	CUT	WD		CUT
U.S. Women's Open	CUT				
Women's British Open ^		T18			

^ The Women's British Open replaced the du Maurier Classic as an LPGA major in 2001.

Win
Top 10
Did not play

CUT = missed the half-way cut
WD = withdrew
"T" = tied

=== Summary ===
Tournament	Wins	2nd	3rd	Top-5	Top-10	Top-25	Events	Cuts made
Kraft Nabisco Championship	0	0	0	1	4	9	16	16
LPGA Championship	1	0	0	1	3	8	21	15
U.S. Women's Open	1	0	1	2	5	6	16	11
du Maurier Classic	0	1	0	3	6	10	16	12
Women's British Open	0	0	0	0	0	1	1	1
Totals	2	1	1	7	18	34	70	55

- Most consecutive cuts made – 20 (1988 U.S. Open – 1993 U.S. Open)
- Longest streak of top-10s – 3 (three times)

== Team appearances ==
Professional

- Solheim Cup (representing the United States): 1996 (winners)
- Handa Cup (representing the United States): 2006 (winners)

== See also ==
- List of golfers with most LPGA Tour wins
- List of golfers with most LPGA major championship wins
