= Val Skinner =

American professional golfer (born 1960)

Personal information
- Nationality: United States
- Born: October 16, 1960 (age 66) Hamilton, Montana, U.S.
- Height: 5 ft 6 in (1.68 m)

Career
- Sport: Golf
- College: Oklahoma State University
- Turned professional: 1982
- Current tour: Legends Tour
- Former tours: LPGA Tour (1983–2003); Women's Professional Golf Tour
- Professional wins: 10

Number of wins by tour
- LPGA Tour: 6
- Other: 4

Best results in LPGA major championships
- Chevron Championship: 2nd: 1986
- Women's PGA C'ship: T5: 1996
- U.S. Women's Open: T8: 1996
- du Maurier Classic: T4: 1985
- Women's British Open: DNP

Achievements and awards
- LPGA Komen Award: 1999

Val Skinner (born October 16, 1960) is an American professional golfer who played on the LPGA Tour.

== Early life and amateur career ==
Skinner was born in Hamilton, Montana in 1960. Her family later moved to Nebraska. Skinner was the 1974 Nebraska Junior Girls champion and the 1976 Nebraska High School State champion and won both these titles in 1978. She was also the 1980 Nebraska Match Play champion.

Skinner played her collegiate golf at Oklahoma State University. She was 1980 and 1982 Big Eight Conference champion and the 1982 Big Eight Outstanding Female Athlete of the Year.

== Professional career ==
In 1982, Skinner turned professional. She began her professional career on the Women's Professional Golf Tour (WPGT), a women's min-tour. She won four times and earned rookie of the year honors for the fall season.

In 1983, Skinner gained exempt status for the LPGA Tour in 1983 by finishing tied for third at the LPGA Final Qualifying Tournament. She has six LPGA career victories and was a member of the 1996 U.S. Solheim Cup team and Captain of the 2003 U.S. PING Junior Solheim Cup team.

She has established the Val Skinner Foundation to promote awareness of breast cancer risks and early breast cancer detection.

== Awards and honors ==
In 1999, she earned the LPGA's Komen Award, bestowed to individuals who provoke breast cancer awareness.

== Professional wins (10) ==
=== LPGA Tour wins (6) ===
| No. | Date | Tournament | Winning score | Margin of Victory | Runner-up |
|---|---|---|---|---|---|
| 1 | Sep 22, 1985 | Konica San Jose Classic | −7 (71-71-67=209) | Playoff | (United States) Pat Bradley |
| 2 | Jan 26, 1986 | Mazda Classic | −8 (74-69-68-69=280) | 1 stroke | (United States) Sandra Palmer |
| 3 | Aug 16, 1987 | MasterCard International Pro-Am | −4 (67-70-75=212) | 1 stroke | (United States) Shelley Hamlin |
| 4 | May 23, 1993 | Lady Keystone Open | −6 (70-73-67=210) | 2 strokes | (United States) Betsy King |
| 5 | Apr 17, 1994 | Atlanta Women's Championship | −10 (70-68-68=206) | 1 stroke | (Sweden) Liselotte Neumann |
| 6 | Apr 30, 1995 | Sprint Championship | −15 (71-65-70-67=273) | 2 strokes | (United States) Kris Tschetter |

LPGA Tour playoff record (1–1)

| No. | Year | Tournament | Opponent | Result |
|---|---|---|---|---|
| 1 | 1985 | Konica San Jose Classic | (United States) Pat Bradley | Won with par on first extra hole |
| 2 | 1996 | Twelve Bridges LPGA Classic | (United States) Kelly Robbins | Lost to birdie on fifth extra hole |

=== Women's Professional Golf Tour wins (4) ===
- 1982 Tropicana Open, WPGT Team Championship (with Nanette Circo), Don McCullough Chrysler Open, Bakersfield Classic

== Team appearances ==
Professional

- Solheim Cup (representing the United States): 1996 (winners)
- Handa Cup (representing the United States): 2014 (winners)
