= Penny Pulz =

Australian professional golfer (born 1953)

Personal information
- Nationality: Australia
- Born: 2 February 1953 (age 73) Melbourne, Australia
- Height: 5 ft 4 in (1.63 m)
- Spouse: June Schwertfager

Career
- Sport: Golf
- Status: Professional
- Former tour: LPGA Tour (1974–1992)
- Professional wins: 2

Number of wins by tour
- LPGA Tour: 2

Best results in LPGA major championships
- Chevron Championship: T34: 1985, 1986
- Women's PGA C'ship: 6th/T6: 1979, 1984
- U.S. Women's Open: T5: 1984
- du Maurier Classic: T14: 1985

Penny Pulz (born 2 February 1953) is an Australian professional golfer who played on the LPGA Tour.

Pulz won twice on the LPGA Tour in 1979 and 1986.

== LPGA Tour wins (2) ==
No.	Date	Tournament	Winning score	Margin of victory	Runner-up
1	27 May 1979	Corning Classic	+4 (75-71-70-68=284)	2 strokes	(United States) Judy Rankin
2	23 Mar 1986	Circle K Tucson Open	−12 (72-71-69-64=276)	4 strokes	(United States) Betsy King

LPGA Tour playoff record (0–2)

No.	Year	Tournament	Opponent(s)	Result
1	1978	Colgate-Dinah Shore Winner's Circle	(Canada) Sandra Post	Lost to par on second extra hole
2	1981	West Virginia Bank Classic	(United States) Susie McAllister (United States) Kathy Postlewait (United States) Alice Ritzman (United States) Hollis Stacy	Stacy won with birdie on first extra hole

== Team appearances ==
Amateur

- Tasman Cup (representing Australia): 1972 (winners)
