= Cindy Hill (golfer) =

American professional golfer (born 1948)

Personal information
- Full name: Cynthia Hill
- Nationality: United States
- Born: February 12, 1948 (age 78) South Haven, Michigan, U.S.
- Height: 5 ft 6 in (1.68 m)

Career
- Sport: Golf
- College: University of Miami
- Turned professional: 1979
- Former tour: LPGA Tour (1979–1992)
- Professional wins: 2

Number of wins by tour
- LPGA Tour: 2

Best results in LPGA major championships
- Titleholders C'ship: T24: 1972
- Chevron Championship: T23: 1983
- Women's PGA C'ship: T14: 1984
- U.S. Women's Open: T4: 1981
- du Maurier Classic: T14: 1980

Cynthia Hill (born February 12, 1948) is an American professional golfer who played on the LPGA Tour.

Hill won the U.S. Women's Amateur in 1974 after having lost the final twice before (1970 and 1972). She won the 1975 North and South Women's Amateur. She represented the U.S. in the Curtis Cup four times (1970, 1974, 1976, 1978) and the Espirito Santo Trophy three times (1970, 1974, 1978). She played college golf at the University of Miami and was an All-American in 1969 and 1970. Her team won the AIAW Championship in 1970. She turned pro at age 31.

Hill won twice on the LPGA Tour: in 1984 and 1987.

== Professional wins ==
=== LPGA Tour wins (2) ===
No.	Date	Tournament	Winning score	Margin of victory	Runner(s)-up
1	Sep 3, 1984	Rail Charity Classic	−9 (68-68-71=207)	2 strokes	(Australia) Jane Crafter (United States) Lori Garbacz (United States) Betsy King
2	May 3, 1987	S&H Golf Classic	−17 (70-66-69-66=271)	3 strokes	(Australia) Jane Crafter

LPGA Tour playoff record (0–2)

No.	Year	Tournament	Opponents	Result
1	1981	Florida Lady Citrus	(United States) Donna Caponi (United States) Beth Daniel (United States) Patty Sheehan (United States) Patti Rizzo	Daniel won with birdie on second extra hole Hill, Rizzo, and Sheehan eliminated by par on first hole
2	1986	Lady Keystone Open	(United States) Juli Inkster (United States) Debbie Massey	Inkster won with par on first extra hole

== U.S. national team appearances ==
Amateur

- Curtis Cup: 1970 (winners), 1974 (winners), 1976 (winners), 1978 (winners)
- Espirito Santo Trophy: 1970 (winners), 1974 (winners), 1978
