= Muffin Spencer-Devlin =

American professional golfer (born 1953)

Personal information
- Nationality: United States
- Born: October 25, 1953 (age 73) Piqua, Ohio, U.S.
- Height: 5 ft 11 in (1.80 m)

Career
- Sport: Golf
- College: American College of Switzerland; Rollins College
- Status: Professional
- Former tour: LPGA Tour (1979–2000)
- Professional wins: 3

Number of wins by tour
- LPGA Tour: 3

Best results in LPGA major championships
- Chevron Championship: T12: 1988, 1992
- Women's PGA C'ship: 5th: 1986
- U.S. Women's Open: T10: 1982
- du Maurier Classic: T25: 1982

Muffin Spencer-Devlin (born October 25, 1953) is an American retired professional golfer who played on the LPGA Tour and a glass artist.

== Career ==
She was born in Piqua, Ohio and joined the LPGA in 1979. She won the times on the tour between 1985 and 1989.

She is openly gay and, in 1996, became the first LPGA player to come out as gay.

Spencer-Devlin retired from the LPGA tour in 2001. She briefly made a return to golf in 2004 and 2005. Since retiring from golf, Spencer-Devlin became a glassblower.

== Personal life ==
Spencer-Devlin made a cameo appearance as a member of Starfleet Medical in the feature film Star Trek Generations that was released in 1994, and made a brief appearance in "The Chute", the third episode of the 1995 series Star Trek: Voyager.

== Awards and honors ==
In 2015, she was awarded the IMAGINE Award, an honor for those living and excelling with bipolar disorder.

== Professional wins (3) ==
=== LPGA Tour wins (3) ===
No.	Date	Tournament	Winning score	Margin of victory	Runners-up
1	Aug 18, 1985	MasterCard International Pro-Am	−7 (70-75-64=209)	2 strokes	(United States) Deedee Lasker (United States) Kim Shipman
2	May 11, 1986	United Virginia Bank Classic	−2 (76-69-69=214)	1 stroke	(United States) Debbie Massey (United States) Jody Rosenthal (United States) Barb Thomas
3	Sep 10, 1989	Cellular One-Ping Golf Championship	−2 (74-69-71=214)	1 stroke	(Canada) Dawn Coe (United States) Nancy Lopez (United States) Susan Sanders
