= Myra Blackwelder =

American professional golfer (born 1995)

Personal information
- Full name: Myra VanHoose Blackwelder
- Nationality: United States
- Born: May 9, 1955 (age 71) Lexington, Kentucky, U.S.
- Height: 5 ft 4 in (1.63 m)
- Spouse: Worth Blackwelder
- Children: 2

Career
- Sport: Golf
- College: University of Kentucky
- Turned professional: 1980
- Former tours: LPGA Tour (1980–1992); Legends Tour (2001–2006)

Best results in LPGA major championships
- Chevron Championship: T7: 1985
- Women's PGA C'ship: 7th: 1986
- U.S. Women's Open: T6: 1983
- du Maurier Classic: T21: 1989

Achievements and awards
- LPGA Rookie of the Year: 1980

Myra VanHoose Blackwelder (born May 9, 1955) is an American professional golfer who played on the LPGA Tour and the Legends Tour. She turned professional in 1980 at age 24. She now resides in Lexington, Kentucky where she is an instructor of golf at the High Performance Golf Academy at Keene Run Golf Course.

== Family and education ==
Blackwelder has two children, Myles and Mallory Blackwelder, who have both become successful in the field of golf. Her husband, Worth Blackwelder, has been a caddie for numerous professional players including Myra herself. Blackwelder graduated from the University of Kentucky with a degree in agronomy.

== Amateur career ==
Blackwelder started playing golf when she was 13. She quickly picked up the sport and joined the Lafayette High School team her 8th grade year. During her high school career, Blackwelder won the KHSAA State Golf Tournament four consecutive years. At age 15, she won her first amateur title. During her time at the University of Kentucky, Myra received the first full athletic scholarship given to a female due to the Title IX legislation. While a Wildcat, she won 10 invitational tournaments and two Kentucky State Amateur tournaments. She earned her LPGA Tour Card in January 1980 by playing on the Symetra Tour.

== Professional career ==
Blackwelder won the title LPGA Rookie of the Year in 1980 after she placed second at an LPGA tournament. She continued playing on the LPGA Tour for 13 seasons. She retired in 1992 at age 37, though she continued to play a few events each year through 1997, and now plays on the Legends Tour. Her total career earnings are $634,522.

== Instructional career ==
Blackwelder began teaching in 1992, shortly after she retired from the LPGA. She has had numerous students go on to compete at the collegiate level and beyond. From 1999 to 2001, Myra coached both the boys and girls golf teams at Woodford County High School which overlapped with her coaching position at Transylvania University from 2000 to 2001. She held the position of head coach of the Kentucky Wildcats women's golf program from 2007 to 2010 where the team beat the previous scoring record.

== Achievements and awards ==
- Won the title Rookie of the Year in 1980 after her successful first LPGA season.
- Her family won "Golf Family of the Year" in 2014 for her family's contributions to the game
- Myra and her daughter, Mallory, became the first mother and daughter to have LPGA membership at the same time 2009.
- She is the founder and co-owner of America's Golf Team which provides grants for junior golfers and young professionals.
