= 1986 du Maurier Classic =

Coordinates: 43.793402°N 79.588323°W

The 1986 du Maurier Classic was contested from July 24–27 at Board of Trade Country Club. It was the 14th edition of the du Maurier Classic, and the eighth edition as a major championship on the LPGA Tour.

This event was won by Pat Bradley in a sudden-death playoff over Ayako Okamoto with a birdie on the first extra hole.

== Final leaderboard ==
Place	Player	Score	To par	Money (US$)
1	(United States) Pat Bradley	73-70-67-66=276	−12	52,500
2	(Japan) Ayako Okamoto	73-70-69-64=276	−12	32,375
T3	(United States) Betsy King	72-67-71-71=281	−7	21,000
T3	(United States) Nancy Scranton	70-64-78-69=281	−7	21,000
T5	(United States) Christa Johnson	67-68-74-73=282	−6	13,563
T5	(United States) Cathy Morse	70-73-68-71=282	−6	13,563
7	(United States) Rosie Jones	72-72-71-68=283	−5	10,325
T8	(United States) Amy Alcott	75-72-68-69=284	−4	8,225
T8	(United States) Patti Rizzo	74-69-70-71=284	−4	8,225
T8	(United States) Sherri Turner	71-71-73-69=284	−4	8,225
