= Uniden LPGA Invitational =

Golf tournament formerly on the LPGA Tour

The Uniden LPGA Invitational was a golf tournament on the LPGA Tour from 1984 to 1986. It was played at the Mesa Verde Country Club in Costa Mesa, California.

== Winners ==
- 1986 Mary Beth Zimmerman
- 1985 Bonnie Lauer
- 1984 Nancy Lopez
