= MasterCard International Pro-Am =

Golf tournament formerly on the LPGA Tour

The MasterCard International Pro-Am was a golf tournament on the LPGA Tour from 1984 to 1987. It was played at several different courses in Westchester County, New York.

== Tournament locations ==
Years	Venue	Location
1984	Wykagyl Country Club	New Rochelle, New York
1985-87	Westchester Hills Golf Club	White Plains, New York
1985-86	Knollwood Country Club	Elmsford, New York
1986-87	Ridgeway Country Club	White Plains, New York

== Winners ==
- 1987 Val Skinner
- 1986 Cindy Mackey
- 1985 Muffin Spencer-Devlin
- 1984 Sally Quinlan
