= Women's Kemper Open =

Golf tournament formerly on the LPGA Tour

The Women's Kemper Open was a golf tournament on the LPGA Tour from 1979 to 1992. It was played at several different courses in California and Hawaii.

== Tournament locations ==
Years	Venue	Location
1979–1981	Mesa Verde Country Club	Costa Mesa, California
1982–1985	Royal Kaanapali North	Lahaina, Hawaii
1986–1990	Princeville Makai Golf Course	Princeville, Hawaii
1990–1992	Wailea Golf Club, Blue Course	Wailea, Hawaii

== Winners ==
Year	Winner	Score	To par	Margin of victory	Runner(s)-up	Purse ($)	Winner's share ($)	Ref.
1992	(United States) Dawn Coe							
1991	(United States) Deb Richard							
1990	(United States) Beth Daniel							
1989	(United States) Betsy King							
1988	(United States) Betsy King	280	−8	1 stroke	(United States) Beth Daniel	300,000	45,000	
1987	(United States) Jane Geddes							
1986	(United States) Juli Inkster							
1985	(United States) Jane Blalock							
1984	(United States) Betsy King							
1983	(United States) Kathy Whitworth							
1982	(United States) Amy Alcott							
1981	(United States) Pat Bradley							
1980	(United States) Nancy Lopez							
1979	(United States) JoAnne Carner							

== Tournament highlights ==
- 1979: For the first time ever, an LPGA Tour event ends regulation play with five golfers tied for the lead. JoAnne Carner goes on to par the second sudden-death playoff hole to defeat Hisako Higuchi, Nancy Lopez, Donna Caponi, and Jan Stephenson.
- 1984: Future World Golf Hall of Fame member Betsy King wins for the first time on the LPGA Tour. She finishes two shots ahead of Pat Bradley.
- 1985: Jane Blalock notches her first LPGA Tour win in nearly five years when Pat Bradley makes double bogey on the tournament's 72nd hole to lose by one shot.
- 1990: Beth Daniel birdies the final two holes to complete a seven-shot comeback and win by one shot over Laura Davies and Rosie Jones.
