= Laurie Rinker =

American professional golfer (born 1962)

Personal information
- Full name: Laurie Anne Rinker
- Nationality: United States
- Born: September 28, 1962 (age 64) Stuart, Florida, U.S.
- Height: 5 ft 6 in (1.68 m)

Career
- Sport: Golf
- College: University of Florida
- Turned professional: 1982
- Former tour: LPGA Tour
- Professional wins: 8

Number of wins by tour
- LPGA Tour: 2
- LPGA of Japan Tour: 1
- Other: 5

Best results in LPGA major championships
- Chevron Championship: 7th: 1984
- Women's PGA C'ship: T3: 1987
- U.S. Women's Open: T21: 1986
- du Maurier Classic: T7: 1995
- Women's British Open: CUT: 2005

Laurie Anne Rinker (born September 28, 1962) is an American professional golfer who played on the LPGA Tour in the 1980s, 1990s and early 2000s.

== Early life and amateur career ==
In 1962, Rinker was born in Stuart, Florida. She was also raised in the town. Rinker's two brothers, Larry and Lee, have played on the PGA Tour.

Rinker attended the University of Florida in Gainesville, Florida, where she played for coach Mimi Ryan's Florida Gators women's golf team from 1980 to 1982. She was recognized as an All-American in 1980 and 1982.

Rinker qualified for the LPGA Tour in the summer between her junior and senior year of college. She completed her education by traveling to the University of Florida during off weeks, and graduated with a bachelor's degree in finance in 1983.

== Professional career ==
Rinker's best years in professional golf came in the mid-1980s, and included two LPGA Tour wins: the 1984 Boston Five Classic and the 1986 LPGA Corning Classic. Her best finishes in the LPGA majors included a seventh place in the 1984 Nabisco Dinah Shore, a tie for third in the 1987 LPGA Championship, and a tie for seventh in the 1995 du Maurier Classic. The most lucrative year of her career was 1987, when she earned $158,916 and had nine top-10 finishes. To date, she has won over $1,200,000 as a professional golfer.

As the winner of the 2015 LPGA Teaching and Club Professionals Championship, she is qualified for the inaugural U.S. Senior Women's Open in 2018 through 2020 as an eligible winner of the past five editions of the said tournament.

== Personal life ==
Rinker competed under her married name, Laurie Rinker-Graham, from 1992 to 2003. She has two sons, Brent and Timothy.

== Amateur wins ==
- 1980 U.S. Girls' Junior
- 1982 Doherty Challenge Cup

== Professional wins (8) ==
=== LPGA Tour wins (2) ===
No.	Date	Tournament	Winning score	Margin of victory	Runners-up
1	Jun 24, 1984	Boston Five Classic	−2 (65-68-76-77=286)	3 strokes	(United States) Jackie Bertsch (Japan) Ayako Okamoto
2	May 25, 1986	LPGA Corning Classic	−10 (72-70-70-66=278)	3 strokes	(United States) Pat Bradley (United States) Beth Daniel

=== LPGA of Japan Tour wins (1) ===
- 1984 Chukyo TV Bridgestone Ladies Open

=== Other regular wins (2) ===
- 1985 JCPenney Classic (with brother Larry Rinker)
- 2015 LPGA Teaching and Club Professionals Championship.

=== Legends Tour wins (4) ===
- 2011 Women's Senior National Invitational
- 2013 ISPS Handa Legends Open Championship
- 2014 The Legends Championship
- 2015 Chico's Patty Berg Memorial

== Team appearances ==
Professional

- Handa Cup (representing the United States): 2013, 2014 (winners), 2015 (winners)

== See also ==
- List of Florida Gators women's golfers on the LPGA Tour
- List of University of Florida alumni
