= Cathy Morse =

American professional golfer (born 1955)

Personal information
- Full name: Catherine C. Morse
- Nationality: United States
- Born: June 15, 1955 (age 71) Rochester, New York, U.S.
- Height: 5 ft 8 in (1.73 m)

Career
- Sport: Golf
- College: University of Miami
- Status: Professional
- Former tour: LPGA Tour
- Professional wins: 1

Number of wins by tour
- LPGA Tour: 1

Best results in LPGA major championships
- Chevron Championship: T6: 1989
- Women's PGA C'ship: 6th: 1987
- U.S. Women's Open: 5th: 1983
- du Maurier Classic: T5: 1986

Catherine C. Morse (born June 15, 1955) is an American professional golfer who played on the LPGA Tour.

Morse was born in Rochester, New York. She won the 1972 New York State Junior Amateur, and the New York State Women's Amateur in 1974 and 1976. She was runner-up to Nancy Lopez in the 1972 U.S. Girls' Junior.

Morse played college golf at the University of Miami. In 1977, she won the AIAW national individual intercollegiate golf championship and led her team to the team title. She was inducted into the university's Sports Hall of Fame in 2009.

Morse joined the LPGA Tour in 1978 and won just once, at the 1982 Chrysler-Plymouth Charity Classic. She dedicated the win to her late fiancé, Jim Meyer, who died four months earlier.

== Professional wins ==
=== LPGA Tour wins (1) ===
No.	Date	Tournament	Winning score	Margin of victory	Runner-up
1	May 23, 1982	Chrysler-Plymouth Charity Classic	Even (70-72-74=216)	3 strokes	(South Africa) Sally Little
