= GNA/Glendale Federal Classic =

Golf tournament formerly on the LPGA Tour

The GNA/Glendale Federal Classic was a golf tournament on the LPGA Tour from 1985 to 1987. It was played at the Oakmont Country Club in Glendale, California.

== Winners ==
GNA/Glendale Federal Classic

- 1987 Jane Geddes
- 1986 Christa Johnson

GNA Classic

- 1985 Jan Stephenson
