= Chrysler-Plymouth Classic =

Golf tournament formerly on the LPGA Tour

The Chrysler-Plymouth Classic was a golf tournament on the LPGA Tour from 1976 to 1989. It was played at several courses, mostly in New Jersey.

== Tournament locations ==
Years	Venue	Location
1989	Bamm Hollow Country Club	Lincroft, New Jersey
1987–88	Navesink Country Club	Middletown, New Jersey
1985–86	Fairmount Country Club	Chatham, New Jersey
1983–84	Upper Montclair Country Club	Clifton, New Jersey
1982	Wykagyl Country Club	New Rochelle, New York
1981	Ridgewood Country Club	Paramus, New Jersey
1979–80	Upper Montclair Country Club	Clifton, New Jersey
1976–78	Forsgate Country Club	Monroe Township, New Jersey

== Winners ==
Year	Dates	Champion	Country	Score	Margin of victory	Purse ($)	Winner's share ($)
Chrysler-Plymouth Classic
1989	May 12–24	Cindy Rarick	United States	214 (−5)	2 strokes	275,000	41,250
1988	May 13–15	Nancy Lopez	United States	204 (−12)	8 strokes	250,000	37,500
1987	May 15–17	Ayako Okamoto	Japan	215 (−4)	2 strokes	225,000	33,750
1986	May 16–18	Becky Pearson	United States	212 (−7)	1 stroke	200,000	30,000
1985	May 17–19	Nancy Lopez	United States	210 (−9)	3 strokes	175,000	26,250
Chrysler-Plymouth Charity Classic
1984	May 18–20	Barb Bunkowsky	Canada	209 (−10)	4 strokes	175,000	26,250
1983	May 20–22	Pat Bradley	United States	212 (−7)	1 stroke	125,000	18,750
1982	May 21–23	Cathy Morse	United States	216 (E)	3 strokes	125,000	18,750
Coca-Cola Classic
1981	May 15–17	Kathy Whitworth	United States	211 (−8)	Playoff	125,000	18,750
1980	May 16–18	Donna White	United States	217 (−2)	Playoff	125,000	18,750
1979	May 18–20	Nancy Lopez	United States	216 (−3)	Playoff	100,000	15,000
1978	May 19–21	Nancy Lopez	United States	210 (−3)	Playoff	100,000	15,000
LPGA Coca-Cola Classic
1977	May 13–15	Kathy Whitworth	United States	202 (−11)	3 strokes	77,000	11,500
'76 LPGA Classic
1976	May 14–16	Amy Alcott	United States	209 (−4)	1 stroke	76,000	14,000
