= LPGA State Farm Classic =

Golf tournament formerly on the LPGA Tour

Coordinates: 39.7288°N 89.7115°W

Tournament information
- Location: Springfield, Illinois, U.S.
- Established: 1976
- Courses: Panther Creek Country Club (2007-2011)
- Par: 72
- Length: 6,746 yards (6,169 m)
- Tour: LPGA Tour
- Format: Stroke play - 72 holes
- Prize fund: $1,700,000
- Final year: 2011

Tournament record score
- Aggregate: 264 Cristie Kerr (2004)
- To par: –24 Cristie Kerr (2004)

Final champion
- (Taiwan) Yani Tseng

The LPGA State Farm Classic was a women's professional golf tournament on the LPGA Tour. It was played annually from 1976 to 2011 in the Springfield, Illinois metropolitan area. From 1976 through 2006, the tournament was held at The Rail Golf Course. In 2007 it moved to Panther Creek Country Club.

Originally known as the Jerry Lewis Muscular Dystrophy Golf Classic, the tournament was underwritten solely by the owners of The Rail Golf Course for its first two years. A community-based not-for-profit organization took over the tournament in 1978. State Farm Insurance became the title sponsor in 1993. From 1980 until cancellation in 2011, over $2.5 million was contributed from tournament proceeds to medical and children's charities.

On December 9, 2011, it was announced the tournament was being cancelled due to organizers failing to find a new sponsor. It had been announced earlier in the year that State Farm would be dropping its sponsorship after 2011.

Tournament names through the years:

- 1976: Jerry Lewis Muscular Dystrophy Classic
- 1977: Rail Muscular Dystrophy Classic
- 1978–1992: Rail Charity (Golf) Classic
- 1993–2000: State Farm Rail Classic
- 2001–2006: State Farm Classic
- 2007–2011: LPGA State Farm Classic

== Winners ==
Year	Dates	Champion	Country	Score	Tournament Location	Purse ($)	Winner's share ($)
2011	Jun 9–12	Yani Tseng	Taiwan	267 (−21)	Panther Creek Country Club	1,700,000	255,000
2010	Jun 10–14	Cristie Kerr (2)	United States	266 (−22)	Panther Creek Country Club	1,700,000	255,000
2009	Jun 4–7	In-Kyung Kim	South Korea	271 (−17)	Panther Creek Country Club	1,700,000	255,000
2008	Jul 17–20	Ji Young Oh	South Korea	270 (−18)*	Panther Creek Country Club	1,700,000	255,000
2007	Aug 30 – Sep 2	Sherri Steinhauer	United States	271 (−17)	Panther Creek Country Club	1,300,000	195,000
2006	Aug 31 – Sep 3	Annika Sörenstam	Sweden	269 (−19)	The Rail Golf Course	1,300,000	195,000
2005	Sep 1–4	Pat Hurst	United States	271 (−17)	The Rail Golf Course	1,300,000	195,000
2004	Sep 2–5	Cristie Kerr	United States	264 (−24)	The Rail Golf Course	1,200,000	180,000
2003	Aug 28–31	Candie Kung	Taiwan	202 (−14)	The Rail Golf Course	1,200,000	180,000
2002	Aug 29 – Sep 1	Patricia Meunier-Lebouc	France	270 (−18)	The Rail Golf Course	1,100,000	165,000
2001	Aug 30 – Sep 2	Kate Golden	United States	267 (−21)	The Rail Golf Course	1,000,000	150,000
2000	Sep 1–3	Laurel Kean	United States	198 (−19)	The Rail Golf Course	900,000	135,000
1999	Sep 4–6	Mi Hyun Kim	South Korea	204 (−12)	The Rail Golf Course	775,000	116,500
1998	Aug 28–30	Pearl Sinn	United States	200 (−16)	The Rail Golf Course	775,000	116,500
1997	Aug 30 – Sep 1	Cindy Figg-Currier	United States	200 (−16)*	The Rail Golf Course	600,000	90,000
1996	Aug 31 – Sep 2	Michelle McGann	United States	202 (−14)*	The Rail Golf Course	575,000	86,250
1995	Sep 2–4	Mary Beth Zimmerman	United States	206 (−10)*	The Rail Golf Course	550,000	82,500
1994	Sep 3–5	Barb Mucha	United States	203 (−13)	The Rail Golf Course	525,000	78,750
1993	Sep 4–6	Helen Dobson	England	203 (−13)*	The Rail Golf Course	500,000	82,500
1992	Sep 5–7	Nancy Lopez (2)	United States	199 (−17)*	The Rail Golf Course	450,000	67,500
1991		Pat Bradley (2)	United States	197 (−19)	The Rail Golf Course	400,000	60,000
1990		Beth Daniel (2)	United States	203 (−13)	The Rail Golf Course	300,000	45,000
1989		Beth Daniel	United States	203 (−13)	The Rail Golf Course	250,000	41,250
1988		Betsy King (3)	United States	207 (−9)	The Rail Golf Course	500,000	33,750
1987		Rosie Jones	United States	208 (−8)	The Rail Golf Course	200,000	30,000
1986		Betsy King	United States	205 (−11)*	The Rail Golf Course	200,000	30,000
1985		Betsy King	United States	205 (−11)	The Rail Golf Course	185,000	27,750
1984		Cindy Hill	United States	207 (−9)	The Rail Golf Course	175,000	26,250
1983		Lauri Peterson	United States	210 (−6)	The Rail Golf Course	150,000	22,500
1982		JoAnne Carner (2)	United States	202 (−14)	The Rail Golf Course	125,000	18,750
1981		JoAnne Carner	United States	205 (−11)	The Rail Golf Course	125,000	18,750
1980		Nancy Lopez	United States	275 (−13)	The Rail Golf Course	125,000	18,750
1979		Jo Ann Washam	United States	275 (−13)	The Rail Golf Course	100,000	15,000
1978	Sep 1–4	Pat Bradley	United States	276 (−12)	The Rail Golf Course	100,000	15,000
1977		Hollis Stacy	United States	271 (−17)	The Rail Golf Course	100,000	15,000
1976	Sep 3–5	Sandra Palmer	United States	213 (−3)*	The Rail Golf Course	100,000	15,000

* Championship won in sudden-death playoff.

- 1976 and 1981–2000 — 54-hole tournament
- 1977–1980 and 2001–2011 — 72-hole tournament, although the tournament in 2003 was shortened to 54 holes due to rain.

== Tournament records ==
Year	Player	Score	Round	Course
1991	Laura Davies	62 (−10)	1st	The Rail Golf Course
1997	Kathryn Marshall	62 (−10)	2nd	The Rail Golf Course
2004	Christina Kim	62 (−10)	1st	The Rail Golf Course
2006	Annika Sörenstam	62 (−10)	4th	The Rail Golf Course
2008	Hee-Won Han	61 (−11)	3rd	Panther Creek Country Club
