= HealthSouth Inaugural =

Golf tournament formerly on the LPGA Tour

The HealthSouth Inaugural was a golf tournament on the LPGA Tour from 1980 to 1999. It was played at several courses in Florida. HealthSouth Corporation sponsored the event from 1993 to 1999.

== Tournaments venues ==
Year	Venue	Location
1980–1985	Deer Creek Country Club	Deerfield Beach, Florida
1986–1989	Stonebridge Golf & Country Club	Boca Raton, Florida
1990–1994	Wycliffe Golf & Country Club	Lake Worth, Florida
1995	Eagle Pines at Walt Disney World Resort	Kissimmee, Florida
1996–1997	Walt Disney World Lake Buena Vista Course	Lake Buena Vista, Florida
1998–1999	Grand Cypress Resort	Orlando, Florida

== Winners ==
HEALTHSOUTH Inaugural

- 1999 Kelly Robbins
- 1998 Kelly Robbins
- 1997 Michelle McGann
- 1996 Karrie Webb
- 1995 Pat Bradley

HEALTHSOUTH Palm Beach Classic

- 1994 Dawn Coe-Jones
- 1993 Tammie Green

Oldsmobile LPGA Classic

- 1992 Colleen Walker
- 1991 Meg Mallon
- 1990 Pat Bradley
- 1989 Dottie Mochrie

Mazda Classic

- 1988 Nancy Lopez
- 1987 Kathy Postlewait
- 1986 Val Skinner

Mazda Classic of Deer Creek

- 1985 Hollis Stacy
- 1984 Silvia Bertolaccini
- 1983 Pat Bradley

Whirlpool Championship of Deer Creek

- 1982 Hollis Stacy
- 1981 Sandra Palmer
- 1980 JoAnne Carner
