= Pat Bradley (golfer) =

American professional golfer (born 1951)

Personal information
- Nationality: United States
- Born: March 24, 1951 (age 75) Westford, Massachusetts, U.S.
- Height: 5 ft 6 in (1.68 m)

Career
- Sport: Golf
- College: Florida International
- Turned professional: 1974
- Former tour: LPGA Tour
- Professional wins: 36

Number of wins by tour
- LPGA Tour: 31
- LPGA of Japan Tour: 1
- Other: 5

Best results in LPGA major championships (wins: 6)
- Chevron Championship: Won: 1986
- Women's PGA C'ship: Won: 1986
- U.S. Women's Open: Won: 1981
- du Maurier Classic: Won: 1980, 1985, 1986
- Women's British Open: DNP

Achievements and awards
- World Golf Hall of Fame: 1991 (member page)
- LPGA Tour Money Winner: 1986, 1991
- LPGA Tour Player of the Year: 1986, 1991
- LPGA Tour Vare Trophy: 1986, 1991
- GWAA Female Player of the Year: 1986
- LPGA William and Mousie Powell Award: 1991
- LPGA Patty Berg Award: 2001
- NH Golf Hall of Fame: 2018

Pat Bradley (born March 24, 1951) is an American professional golfer. She became a member of the LPGA Tour in 1974 and won 31 tour events, including six major championships. She is a member of the World Golf Hall of Fame.

== Early life ==
Bradley was born on March 24, 1951, in Westford, Massachusetts. She was the only daughter among six children of Richard and Kay Bradley. Her father was an avid golfer. In 1967 and 1969, Bradley won the New Hampshire Amateur. As a teenager, she was also an accomplished alpine ski racer.

Her brothers include Mark, a PGA club professional in Jackson Hole, Wyoming, whose son Keegan Bradley won the PGA Championship in 2011. The Bradleys were named "Golf Family of the Year" in 1989 by the National Golf Foundation.

== Amateur career ==
As a member of the golf team of Florida International University in Miami, she was named an All-American in 1970. In early 1973, Bradley tied for twelfth as an amateur at the Burdine's Invitational on the LPGA Tour.

In 1972 and 1973, Bradley also won the New England Amateur.

== Professional career ==
In 1974, Bradley joined the LPGA Tour. She earned her first win at the 1976 Girl Talk Classic (she also finished second six times that year). Her breakout year was 1978, when she won three times. Her most fertile years came in the early to mid-1980s. She led the LPGA in wins in 1983 (4) and 1986 (5). Her first major came at the 1980 Peter Jackson Classic, followed by the U.S. Women's Open in 1981, and the du Maurier Classic in 1985.

In 1986, Bradley won three of the four LPGA majors - the du Maurier Classic, Nabisco Dinah Shore, and LPGA Championship. She finished fifth in the U.S. Women's Open, three strokes back, to narrowly miss the grand slam. Bradley won the money title and Vare Trophy that year, as well. In 1988, she was diagnosed with Graves' disease, and she played in 17 tournaments but made the cut in only eight. But she returned to form in 1989, winning once. Three more wins followed in 1990.

In 1991, Bradley won four times and captured her second money and scoring titles, and was also named LPGA Tour Player of the Year for a second time. She was also inducted into the World Golf Hall of Fame that year. A New York Times survey of other LPGA Tour players published July 22, 1992 ranked Bradley as the tour's best long putter and best course manager as well as the best player on tour. The last of her LPGA victories came in 1995.

Sports psychologist Bob Rotella wrote in his 1996 book, Golf Is a Game of Confidence, that Bradley was the most mentally tough athlete he knew. She won a total of 31 tournaments on the LPGA Tour. She was the third woman, behind Mickey Wright and Louise Suggs, to have completed the LPGA "Career Grand Slam". Bradley played on three U.S. Solheim Cup teams (1990, 1992, 1996) and captained the team in 2000.

== Awards and honors ==
- In 1986 and 1991 she won the LPGA's money title, Player of the Year award, and Vare Trophy, bestowed to the player with the lowest scoring average.
- In 1991, she was inducted into the World Golf Hall of Fame.
- In 2018, she was inducted into the New Hampshire Golf Hall of Fame.

== Professional wins (36) ==
=== LPGA Tour wins (31) ===
Legend
LPGA Tour major championships (6)
Other LPGA Tour (25)

No.	Date	Tournament	Winning score	Margin of victory	Runner(s)-up
1	Jun 6, 1976	Girl Talk Classic	+1 (72-73-72=217)	Playoff	(United States) Bonnie Lauer (Canada) Sandra Post (United States) Judy Rankin
2	Jul 10, 1977	Bankers Trust Classic	−6 (75-68-70=213)	2 strokes	(United States) JoAnne Carner (United States) Carol Mann (United States) Kathy Whitworth
3	Jun 25, 1978	Lady Keystone Open	−10 (70-69-67=206)	4 strokes	(United States) Jane Blalock
4	Jul 30, 1978	Hoosier Classic	−10 (69-69-68=206)	3 strokes	(United States) JoAnne Carner
5	Sep 4, 1978	Rail Charity Classic	−12 (67-66-73-71=276)	4 strokes	(United States) Sharon Miller
6	Jul 20, 1980	Greater Baltimore Golf Classic	−13 (69-70-67=206)	1 stroke	(United States) Nancy Lopez
7	Aug 10, 1980	Peter Jackson Classic	−15 (65-72-69-71=277)	1 stroke	(United States) JoAnne Carner
8	Mar 29, 1981	Women's Kemper Open	E (71-75-68-70=284)	5 strokes	(United States) Debbie Massey
9	Jul 26, 1981	U.S. Women's Open	−9 (71-74-68-66=279)	1 stroke	(United States) Beth Daniel
10	Jan 30, 1983	Mazda Classic of Deer Creek	−16 (68-69-69-66=272)	7 strokes	(United States) Beth Daniel
11	May 22, 1983	Chrysler-Plymouth Charity Classic	−7 (73-73-66=212)	1 stroke	(United States) Stephanie Farwig
12	Aug 28, 1983	Columbia Savings Classic	−11 (71-69-70-67=277)	Playoff	(United States) Beth Daniel
13	Nov 13, 1983	Mazda Japan Classic^{1}	−10 (72-70-64=206)	7 strokes	(United States) Laurie Rinker
14	Jun 16, 1985	Rochester International	−8 (74-67-67-72=280)	2 strokes	(United States) Nancy Lopez
15	Jul 28, 1985	du Maurier Classic	−10 (70-73-67-68=278)	1 stroke	(United States) Jane Geddes
16	Aug 25, 1985	LPGA National Pro-Am	−4 (71-74-71-68=284)	Playoff	(United States) Amy Alcott
17	Apr 6, 1986	Nabisco Dinah Shore	−8 (68-72-69-71=280)	2 strokes	(United States) Val Skinner
18	Apr 27, 1986	S&H Golf Classic	−16 (69-67-71-65=272)	1 stroke	(United States) Janet Coles
19	Jun 1, 1986	LPGA Championship	−11 (67-72-70-68=277)	1 stroke	(United States) Patty Sheehan
20	Jul 27, 1986	du Maurier Classic	−12 (73-70-67-66=276)	Playoff	(Japan) Ayako Okamoto
21	Aug 17, 1986	Nestle World Championship	−9 (72-72-72-63=279)	2 strokes	(United States) Betsy King (United States) Nancy Lopez
22	Mar 29, 1987	Standard Register Turquoise Classic	−6 (75-74-67-70=286)	2 strokes	(United States) Christa Johnson
23	Apr 16, 1989	AI Star/Centinela Hospital Classic	−8 (72 69-67=208)	1 stroke	(United States) Nancy Lopez (United States) Hollis Stacy
24	Feb 4, 1990	Oldsmobile LPGA Classic	−7 (66-65-74-76=281)	Playoff	(United States) Dale Eggeling
25	Mar 25, 1990	Standard Register Turquoise Classic	−12 (70-71-68-71=280)	1 stroke	(Japan) Ayako Okamoto
26	May 27, 1990	LPGA Corning Classic	−10 (69-70-66-69=274)	3 strokes	(United States) Patty Sheehan
27	May 19, 1991	Centel Classic	−10 (70-68-69-71=278)	1 stroke	(Japan) Ayako Okamoto
28	Sep 3, 1991	Rail Charity Golf Classic	−19 (67-65-65=197)	6 strokes	(United States) Danielle Ammaccapane
29	Sep 22, 1991	Safeco Classic	−8 69-67-72-72=280)	Playoff	(United States) Rosie Jones
30	Sep 29, 1991	MBS LPGA Classic	−11 (72-70-67-68=277)	1 stroke	(United States) Michelle Estill
31	Jan 22, 1995	HealthSouth Inaugural	−5 (71-72-68=211)	1 stroke	(United States) Beth Daniel

^{1} Co-sanctioned by the LPGA of Japan Tour

LPGA Tour playoff record (6–4)

No.	Year	Tournament	Opponent(s)	Result
1	1975	Greater Ft. Myers Classic	(United States) Sandra Haynie	Lost to par on second extra hole
2	1976	Girl Talk Classic	(United States) Bonnie Lauer (Canada) Sandra Post (United States) Judy Rankin	Won with par on second extra hole Lauer and Post eliminated by birdie on first hole
3	1976	Wheeling Classic	(United States) Jane Blalock	Lost to par on first extra hole
4	1983	Columbia Savings Classic	(United States) Beth Daniel	Won with birdie on first extra hole
5	1984	Nabisco Dinah Shore	(United States) Juli Inkster	Lost to par on first extra hole
6	1985	LPGA National Pro-Am	(United States) Amy Alcott	Won with birdie on second extra hole
7	1985	Konica San Jose Classic	(United States) Val Skinner	Lost to par on first extra hole
8	1986	du Maurier Classic	(Japan) Ayako Okamoto	Won with birdie on first extra hole
9	1990	Oldsmobile LPGA Classic	(United States) Dale Eggeling	Won with birdie on first extra hole
10	1991	Safeco Classic	(United States) Rosie Jones	Won with birdie on second extra hole

=== Legends Tour (1) ===
- 2005 BJ's Charity Championship (with Patty Sheehan; tie with Cindy Rarick and Jan Stephenson)

=== Other (4) ===
- 1975 Colgate Far East Ladies Tournament
- 1978 JCPenney Mixed Team Classic (with Lon Hinkle)
- 1989 JCPenney Classic (with Bill Glasson)
- 1992 JCPenney/LPGA Skins Game

== Major championships ==
=== Wins (6) ===
Year	Championship	Winning score	Margin	Runner-up
1980	Peter Jackson Classic	−15 (65-72-69-71=277)	1 stroke	(United States) JoAnne Carner
1981	U.S. Women's Open	−9 (71-74-68-66=279)	1 stroke	(United States) Beth Daniel
1985	du Maurier Classic	−10 (70-73-67-68=278)	1 stroke	(United States) Jane Geddes
1986	Nabisco Dinah Shore	−8 (68-72-69-71=280)	2 strokes	(United States) Val Skinner
1986	LPGA Championship	−11 (67-72-70-68=277)	1 stroke	(United States) Patty Sheehan
1986	du Maurier Classic	−12 (73-70-67-66=276)	Playoff^{1}	(Japan) Ayako Okamoto

^{1}Won in a sudden-death playoff on the first playoff hole with a birdie.

=== Results timeline ===
Tournament	1971	1972	1973	1974	1975	1976	1977	1978	1979	1980
LPGA Championship				T22	T26		T2	T54	T10	T15
U.S. Women's Open	CUT				T16	T17	T4	T16	T26	T16
du Maurier Classic	...	...	...	...	...	...	...	...	T18	1

Tournament	1981	1982	1983	1984	1985	1986	1987	1988	1989	1990
Kraft Nabisco Championship	...	...	T15	2	6	1	3	T74	T6	T9
LPGA Championship	T24	T12	T6	T2	T3	1	T21		T4	T9
U.S. Women's Open	1	T21	T8	T13	T12	T5	CUT	CUT	T3	T19
du Maurier Classic	T2	T38	T5	T19	1	1	T25	T39	T2	T8

Tournament	1991	1992	1993	1994	1995	1996	1997	1998	1999	2000
Kraft Nabisco Championship	T3	T17	T12	T19	T16	T23	T35	T42	T13	CUT
LPGA Championship	T2	T15	CUT	T3	T8	T51	T11	T44	65	T23
U.S. Women's Open	2	T29	T4	T25	T3	T3	T28	T46		CUT
du Maurier Classic	T23		CUT	T52	CUT	T53	CUT	CUT	T66	T33

Tournament	2001	2002	2003	2004	2005
Kraft Nabisco Championship			77	CUT	CUT
LPGA Championship			DQ	T56	CUT
U.S. Women's Open					
Women's British Open ^					

^ The Women's British Open replaced the du Maurier Classic as an LPGA major in 2001.

Win
Top 10
Did not play

CUT = missed the half-way cut.
DQ = disqualified
"T" = tied

=== Summary ===
Tournament	Wins	2nd	3rd	Top-5	Top-10	Top-25	Events	Cuts made
Kraft Nabisco Championship	1	1	2	4	7	14	21	18
LPGA Championship	1	3	2	7	10	19	28	25
U.S. Women's Open	1	1	3	8	10	18	26	22
du Maurier Classic	3	2	0	6	7	11	21	17
Women's British Open	0	0	0	0	0	0	0	0
Totals	6	7	7	25	34	63	96	82

- Most consecutive cuts made – 38 (1974 LPGA – 1987 LPGA)
- Longest streak of top-10s – 11 (1989 Kraft Nabisco – 1991 U.S. Open)

== Team appearances ==
Professional

- Solheim Cup (representing the United States): 1990 (winners), 1992, 1996 (winners), 2000 (non-playing captain)
- Handa Cup (representing the United States): 2006 (winners), 2007 (winners), 2008 (winners), 2009 (winners), 2010 (winners), 2011 (winners), 2012 (tie, Cup retained), 2013, 2014 (winners), 2015 (winners)

=== Solheim Cup record ===
Year	Total matches	Total W-L-H	Singles W-L-H	Foursomes W-L-H	Fourballs W-L-H	Points won	Points %
Career	8	2-5-1	1-2-0	0-2-0	1-1-1	3.0	37.5%
1990	3	2-1-0	1-0-0 def. T. Johnson 8&7	0-1-0 lost w/ N. Lopez 2&1	1-0-0 won w/ N. Lopez 2&1	2.0	66.6%
1992	3	0-2-1	0-1-0 lost to P. Wright 4&3	0-1-0 lost w/ D. Mochrie 2&1	0-0-1 halved w/ D. Mochrie	0.5	16.6%
1996	2	0-2-0	0-1-0 lost to A. Sörenstam 2&1	0-0-0	0-1-0 lost w/ K. Robbins 6&5	0.0	0.0%

== See also ==
- List of golfers with most LPGA Tour wins
- List of golfers with most LPGA major championship wins
- Women's career grand slam
