= Jody Anschutz =

American professional golfer (born 1962)

Judy Anschutz
Personal information
- Full name: Judy Rosenthal Anschutz
- Nationality: United States
- Born: October 18, 1962 (age 64) Minneapolis, Minnesota, U.S.
- Height: 5 ft 6 in (1.68 m)

Career
- Sport: Golf
- College: University of Tulsa
- Turned professional: 1985
- Former tour: LPGA Tour (joined 1986)
- Professional wins: 3

Number of wins by tour
- LPGA Tour: 2
- LPGA of Japan Tour: 1

Best results in LPGA major championships (wins: 1)
- Chevron Championship: T4: 1989
- Women's PGA C'ship: T9: 1987
- U.S. Women's Open: T4: 1987
- du Maurier Classic: Won: 1987
- Women's British Open: DNP

Achievements and awards
- LPGA Tour Rookie of the Year: 1986

Jody Anschutz (née Rosenthal; born October 18, 1962) is an American professional golfer.

== Early life and amateur career ==
Rosenthal was born in Minneapolis, Minnesota in 1962.

Rosenthal attended the University of Tulsa. As an amateur she won the 1984 British Ladies Amateur and played for the United States in the 1984 Curtis Cup.

== Professional career ==
In 1986, Rosenthal had her debut season on the LPGA Tour. She won Rookie of the Year honors. In her second season, she won two tournaments including the du Maurier Classic, which was then one of the LPGA's major championships, and finished in the top ten in the other three majors on her way to fifth in the money list.

However, from that time on however her career followed a downwards trajectory. She did not win again and did not make the top one hundred on the money list after 1992. She last played on the LPGA Tour in 2002.

== Personal life ==
She married Fred Anschutz on October 14, 1989.

== Awards and honors ==
In 1986, Rosenthal won the LPGA's Rookie of the Year honors.

== Professional wins (3) ==
=== LPGA Tour wins (2) ===
Legend
LPGA Tour major championships (1)
Other LPGA Tour (1)

No.	Date	Tournament	Winning score	Margin of victory	Runner-up
1	May 10, 1987	United Virginia Bank Golf Classic	−7 (71-72-66=209)	1 stroke	(United States) Cindy Hill
2	Jul 12, 1987	du Maurier Classic	−16 (68-70-68-66=272)	2 strokes	(Japan) Ayako Okamoto

LPGA Tour playoff record (0–1)

No.	Year	Tournament	Opponents	Result
1	1991	Northgate Computer Classic	(United States) Beth Daniel (United States) Cindy Rarick	Rarick won with birdie on third extra hole Anschutz eliminated by par on first hole

=== LPGA of Japan Tour wins (1) ===
- 1986 Daio Paper Elleair Ladies Open

== Major championships ==
=== Wins (1) ===
Year	Championship	Winning score	Margin	Runner-up
1987	du Maurier Classic	−16 (68-70-68-66=272)	2 strokes	(Japan) Ayako Okamoto

== U.S. national team appearances ==
Amateur

- Curtis Cup: 1984 (winners)
- Espirito Santo Trophy: 1984 (winners)
