= 1982 LPGA Tour =

Golf tour season

1982 LPGA Tour season
- Duration: January 28, 1982 – November 7, 1982
- Number of official events: 35
- Most wins: 5 (United States) JoAnne Carner, (United States) Beth Daniel
- Money leader: (United States) JoAnne Carner
- Player of the Year: (United States) JoAnne Carner
- Vare Trophy: (United States) JoAnne Carner
- Rookie of the Year: (United States) Patti Rizzo

The 1982 LPGA Tour was the 33rd season since the LPGA Tour officially began in 1950. The season ran from January 28 to November 7. The season consisted of 35 official money events. JoAnne Carner and Beth Daniel won the most tournaments, five each. Carner led the money list with earnings of $310,400.

There were three first-time winners in 1982: Janet Alex, Cathy Morse, and Ayako Okamoto. Sandra Haynie won the last of her 42 LPGA events in 1982.

The tournament results and award winners are listed below.

== Tournament results ==
The following table shows all the official money events for the 1982 season. "Date" is the ending date of the tournament. The numbers in parentheses after the winners' names are the number of wins they had on the tour up to and including that event. Majors are shown in bold.

Date	Tournament	Location	Winner	Score	Purse ($)	1st prize ($)
Jan 31	Whirlpool Championship of Deer Creek	Florida	(United States) Hollis Stacy (10)	282 (−6)	125,000	18,750
Feb 7	Elizabeth Arden Classic	Florida	(United States) JoAnne Carner (34)	283 (−5)	125,000	18,750
Feb 14	S&H Golf Classic	Florida	(United States) Hollis Stacy (11)	204 (−12)	125,000	18,750
Feb 21	Bent Tree Ladies Classic	Florida	(United States) Beth Daniel (8)	276 (−12)	150,000	22,500
Feb 28	Arizona Copper Classic	Arizona	(Japan) Ayako Okamoto (1)	281 (−7)	125,000	18,750
Mar 7	American Express Sun City Classic	Arizona	(United States) Beth Daniel (9)	278 (−10)	100,000	15,000
Mar 15	Olympia Gold Classic	California	(South Africa) Sally Little (11)	288 (−4)	150,000	22,500
Mar 21	J&B Scotch Pro-Am	Nevada	(United States) Nancy Lopez (24)	279 (−10)	200,000	30,000
Mar 28	Women's Kemper Open	Hawaii	(United States) Amy Alcott (16)	286 (−6)	175,000	26,250
Apr 4	Nabisco Dinah Shore Invitational	California	(South Africa) Sally Little (12)	278 (−10)	300,000	45,000
Apr 18	CPC Women's International	South Carolina	(United States) Kathy Whitworth (82)	281 (−7)	150,000	22,500
Apr 25	Orlando Lady Classic	Florida	(United States) Patty Sheehan (2)	209 (−7)	150,000	22,500
May 2	Birmingham Classic	Alabama	(United States) Beth Daniel (10)	203 (−13)	100,000	15,000
May 9	United Virginia Bank Classic	Virginia	(South Africa) Sally Little (13)	208 (−11)	125,000	18,750
May 16	Lady Michelob	Georgia	(United States) Kathy Whitworth (83)	207 (−9)	150,000	22,500
May 23	Chrysler-Plymouth Charity Classic	New York	(United States) Cathy Morse (1)	216 (E)	125,000	18,750
May 30	Corning Classic	New York	(United States) Sandra Spuzich (6)	280 (−8)	125,000	18,750
Jun 6	McDonald's Classic	Pennsylvania	(United States) JoAnne Carner (35)	276 (−12)	250,000	37,500
Jun 13	**LPGA Championship**	Ohio	(Australia) **Jan Stephenson (8)**	279 (−9)	200,000	30,000
Jun 20	Lady Keystone Open	Pennsylvania	(Australia) Jan Stephenson (9)	211 (−5)	200,000	30,000
Jun 27	Rochester International	New York	(United States) Sandra Haynie (41)	276 (−12)	200,000	30,000
Jul 4	**Peter Jackson Classic**	Canada	(United States) **Sandra Haynie (42)**	280 (−8)	200,000	30,000
Jul 11	West Virginia LPGA Classic	West Virginia	(United States) Hollis Stacy (12)	209 (−7)	125,000	18,750
Jul 18	Mayflower Classic	Indiana	(South Africa) Sally Little (14)	275 (−13)	200,000	30,000
Jul 25	**U.S. Women's Open**	California	(United States) **Janet Alex (1)**	283 (−5)	175,000	27,315
Aug 1	Columbia Savings Classic	Colorado	(United States) Beth Daniel (11)	276 (−12)	200,000	30,000
Aug 8	Boston Five Classic	Massachusetts	(United States) Sandra Palmer (18)	281 (−7)	175,000	26,250
Aug 15	WUI Classic	New York	(United States) Beth Daniel (12)	276 (−12)	125,000	18,750
Aug 22	Chevrolet World Championship of Women's Golf	Ohio	(United States) JoAnne Carner (36)	284 (−4)	125,000	50,000
Aug 29	Henredon Classic	North Carolina	(United States) JoAnne Carner (37)	282 (−6)	165,000	24,750
Sep 6	Rail Charity Golf Classic	Illinois	(United States) JoAnne Carner (38)	202 (−14)	125,000	18,750
Sep 12	Mary Kay Classic	Texas	(United States) Sandra Spuzich (7)	206 (−10)	155,000	23,250
Sep 26	Safeco Classic	Washington	(United States) Patty Sheehan (3)	276 (−12)	175,000	26,250
Oct 3	Inamori Classic	California	(United States) Patty Sheehan (4)	277 (−15)	150,000	22,500
Nov 7	Mazda Japan Classic	Japan	(United States) Nancy Lopez (25)	207 (−9)	250,000	30,000

== Awards ==
Award	Winner	Country
Money winner	JoAnne Carner (2)	United States
Scoring leader (Vare Trophy)	JoAnne Carner (4)	United States
Player of the Year	JoAnne Carner (3)	United States
Rookie of the Year	Patti Rizzo	United States
