= 1984 LPGA Tour =

Golf tour season

1984 LPGA Tour season
- Duration: January 26, 1984 – November 4, 1984
- Number of official events: 36
- Most wins: 4 (United States) Amy Alcott, (United States) Patty Sheehan
- Money leader: (United States) Betsy King
- Player of the Year: (United States) Betsy King
- Vare Trophy: (United States) Patty Sheehan
- Rookie of the Year: (United States) Juli Inkster

The 1984 LPGA Tour was the 35th season since the LPGA Tour officially began in 1950. The season ran from January 26 to November 4. The season consisted of 36 official money events. Amy Alcott and Patty Sheehan won the most tournaments, four each. Betsy King led the money list with earnings of $266,771.

There were eight first-time winners in 1984: Sharon Barrett, Barb Bunkowsky, Cindy Hill, Christa Johnson, Betsy King, Sally Quinlan, Laurie Rinker, and Nayoko Yoshikawa.

The tournament results and award winners are listed below.

== Tournament results ==
The following table shows all the official money events for the 1984 season. "Date" is the ending date of the tournament. The numbers in parentheses after the winners' names are the number of wins they had on the tour up to and including that event. Majors are shown in bold.

Date	Tournament	Location	Winner	Score	Purse ($)	1st prize ($)
Jan 29	Mazda Classic of Deer Creek	Florida	(Argentina) Silvia Bertolaccini (4)	280 (−8)	200,000	30,000
Feb 5	Elizabeth Arden Classic	Florida	(United States) Patty Sheehan (9)	280 (−8)	175,000	26,250
Feb 12	Sarasota Classic	Florida	(United States) Alice Miller (2)	280 (−8)	175,000	26,250
Mar 4	Uniden LPGA Invitational	California	(United States) Nancy Lopez (28)	284 (E)	300,000	45,000
Mar 11	Samaritan Turquoise Classic	Arizona	(United States) Christa Johnson (1)	276 (−12)	150,000	22,500
Mar 18	Tucson Conquistadores Open	Arizona	(United States) Christa Johnson (2)	272 (−16)	150,000	22,500
Mar 25	Women's Kemper Open	Hawaii	(United States) Betsy King (1)	283 (−9)	200,000	30,000
Apr 8	**Nabisco Dinah Shore**	California	(United States) **Juli Inkster (2)**	280 (−8)	400,000	55,000
Apr 15	J&B Scotch Pro-Am	Nevada	(Japan) Ayako Okamoto (3)	275 (−14)	200,000	30,000
Apr 22	S&H Golf Classic	Florida	(United States) Vicki Fergon (2)	275 (−14)	150,000	22,500
Apr 29	Freedom/Orlando Classic	Florida	(United States) Betsy King (2)	202 (−14)	150,000	22,500
May 7	Potamkin Cadillac Classic	Georgia	(United States) Sharon Barrett (1)	213 (−3)	200,000	30,000
May 13	United Virginia Bank Classic	Virginia	(United States) Amy Alcott (18)	210 (−6)	175,000	26,250
May 20	Chrysler-Plymouth Charity Classic	New Jersey	(Canada) Barb Bunkowsky (1)	209 (−10)	175,000	26,250
May 27	LPGA Corning Classic	New York	(United States) JoAnne Carner (41)	281 (−7)	150,000	22,500
Jun 3	**LPGA Championship**	Ohio	(United States) **Patty Sheehan (10)**	272 (−16)	250,000	37,500
Jun 10	McDonald's Kids Classic	Pennsylvania	(United States) Patty Sheehan (11)	281 (−7)	350,000	52,500
Jun 17	Mayflower Classic	Indiana	(Japan) Ayako Okamoto (4)	281 (−7)	250,000	37,500
Jun 24	Boston Five Classic	Massachusetts	(United States) Laurie Rinker (1)	286 (−2)	225,000	33,750
Jul 1	Lady Keystone Open	Pennsylvania	(United States) Amy Alcott (19)	208 (−8)	200,000	30,000
Jul 8	Jamie Farr Toledo Classic	Ohio	(United States) Lauri Peterson (2)	278 (−10)	175,000	26,250
Jul 15	**U.S. Women's Open**	Massachusetts	(United States) **Hollis Stacy (16)**	290 (+2)	225,000	36,000
Jul 22	Rochester International	New York	(United States) Kathy Whitworth (85)	281 (−7)	200,000	30,000
Jul 29	**du Maurier Classic**	Canada	(United States) **Juli Inkster (3)**	279 (−9)	275,000	41,250
Aug 5	West Virginia LPGA Classic	West Virginia	(United States) Alice Miller (3)	209 (−7)	150,000	22,500
Aug 12	Henredon Classic	North Carolina	(United States) Patty Sheehan (12)	277 (−11)	180,000	27,000
Aug 19	Chevrolet World Championship of Women's Golf	Ohio	(United States) Nancy Lopez (29)	281 (−7)	200,000	65,000
Aug 19	MasterCard International Pro-Am	New York	(United States) Sally Quinlan (1)	284 (−4)	100,000	15,287
Aug 26	Columbia Savings Classic	Colorado	(United States) Betsy King (3)	281 (−3)	200,000	30,000
Sep 3	Rail Charity Classic	Illinois	(United States) Cindy Hill (1)	207 (−9)	175,000	26,250
Sep 9	Portland Ping Championship	Oregon	(United States) Amy Alcott (20)	212 (−4)	150,000	22,500
Sep 16	Safeco Classic	Washington	(United States) Kathy Whitworth (86)	279 (−9)	175,000	26,250
Sep 23	San Jose Classic	California	(United States) Amy Alcott (21)	211 (−8)	175,000	26,250
Oct 6	Hitachi Ladies British Open	England	(Japan) Ayako Okamoto (5)	289 (−3)	200,000	30,039
Oct 14	Smirnoff Ladies Irish Open	Northern Ireland	(United States) Kathy Whitworth (87)	285 (−3)	150,000	22,500
Nov 4	Mazda Japan Classic	Japan	(Japan) Nayoko Yoshikawa (1*)	210 (−6)	300,000	41,250

* - non-member at time of win

== Awards ==
Award	Winner	Country
Money winner	Betsy King	United States
Scoring leader (Vare Trophy)	Patty Sheehan	United States
Player of the Year	Betsy King	United States
Rookie of the Year	Juli Inkster	United States
