= Patty Sheehan =

American professional golfer (born 1956)

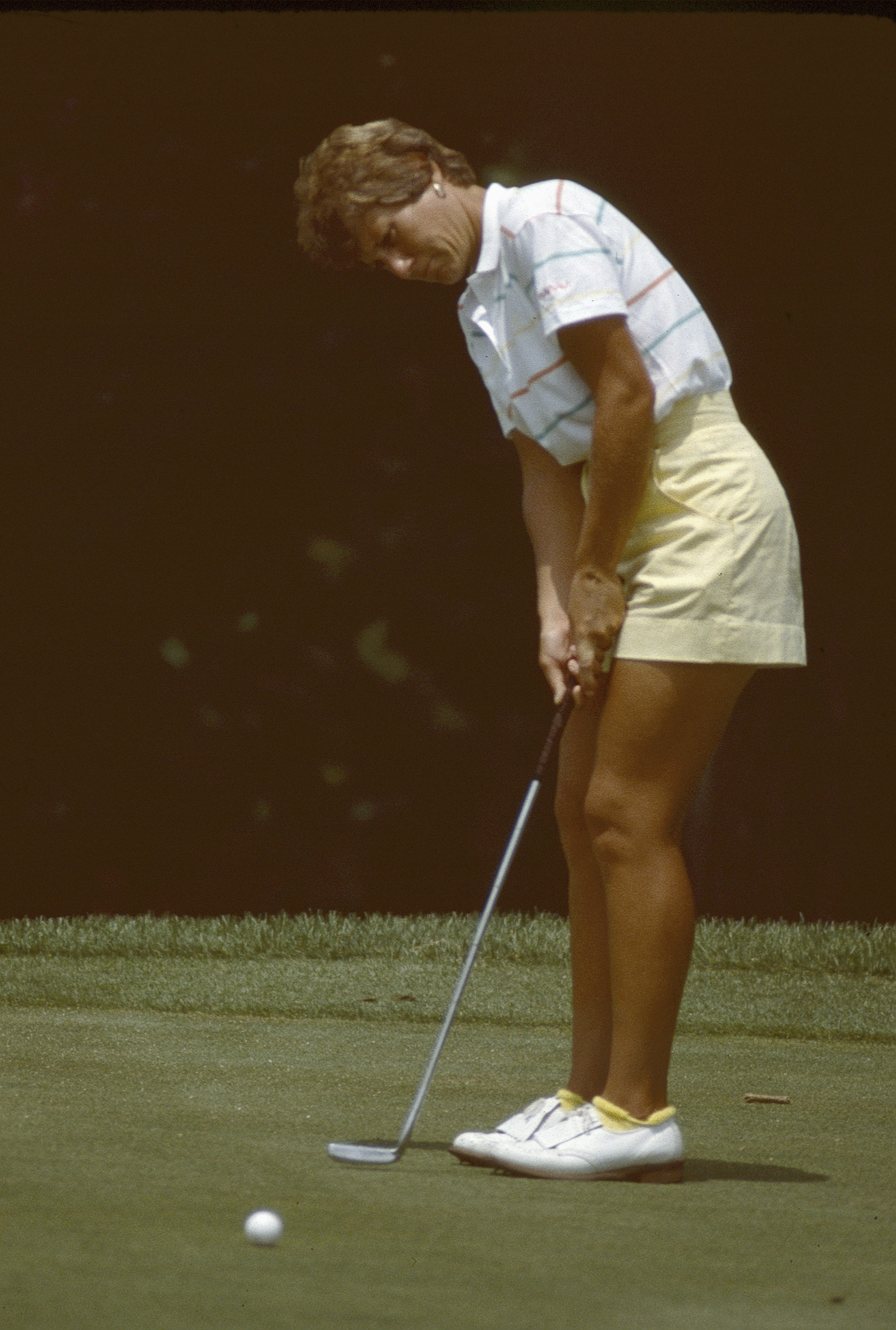
- Sheehan in 2008

Personal information
- Full name: Patty Sheehan
- Nationality: United States
- Born: October 27, 1956 (age 70) Middlebury, Vermont, U.S.
- Height: 5 ft 3 in (1.60 m)
- Spouse: Rebecca Gaston

Career
- Sport: Golf
- College: University of Nevada; San Jose State University
- Turned professional: 1980
- Current tour: Legends Tour
- Former tour: LPGA Tour (1980–2006)
- Professional wins: 41

Number of wins by tour
- LPGA Tour: 35
- Ladies European Tour: 1
- LPGA of Japan Tour: 3
- Other: 4

Best results in LPGA major championships (wins: 6)
- Chevron Championship: Won: 1996
- Women's PGA C'ship: Won: 1983, 1984, 1993
- U.S. Women's Open: Won: 1992, 1994
- du Maurier Classic: 2nd: 1990
- Women's British Open: DNP

Achievements and awards
- World Golf Hall of Fame: 1993 (member page)
- LPGA Rookie of the Year: 1981
- LPGA Tour Player of the Year: 1983
- LPGA Vare Trophy: 1984
- GWAA Female Player of the Year: 1984, 1993
- LPGA Patty Berg Award: 2002
- Sports Illustrated Sportsman of the Year: 1987
- Broderick Award: 1980

Patty Sheehan (born October 27, 1956) is an American professional golfer. She became a member of the LPGA Tour in 1980 and won six major championships and 35 LPGA Tour events in all. She is a member of the World Golf Hall of Fame.

== Early life ==
In 1956, Sheehan was born in Middlebury, Vermont. She was rated one of the top junior snow skiers in the country as a 13-year-old.

Shortly thereafter, her family moved to Nevada. Sheehan attended Earl Wooster High School in Reno, Nevada. She won three straight Nevada high school championships (1972–74).

== Amateur career ==
Sheehan attended University of Nevada and San Jose State University. During this era, she won three straight Nevada State Amateurs (1975–78) and two straight California Women's Amateur Championships (1977–78).

She was the runner-up at the 1979 U.S. Women's Amateur, then was the 1980 AIAW national individual intercollegiate golf champion. She went 4–0 as a member of the 1980 U.S. Curtis Cup team. She won the Broderick Award in 1980.

== Professional career ==
In 1980, Sheehan turned professional and joined the LPGA Tour. She won LPGA Rookie of the Year honors in 1981 with her first professional victory coming at the Mazda Japan Classic. She was strong throughout the 1980s, winning four times in both 1983 and 1984, and winning the LPGA Championship in both seasons. She won LPGA Tour Player of the Year in 1983 and was one of several athletes named Sports Illustrated Sportsman of the Year in 1987.

She suffered a professional loss in 1990, when after holding an 11-shot lead during the third round of the U.S. Women's Open, she lost the tournament to Betsy King.

Sheehan started off the 1990s with five wins in 1990. She won the U.S. Women's Open in 1992 and 1994, the Mazda LPGA Championship in 1995, and the Nabisco Dinah Shore (now known as the Kraft Nabisco Championship) in 1996. That would be her final LPGA victory. She qualified for the LPGA Hall of Fame by winning her 30th tournament in 1993. She finished in the Top 10 on the LPGA money list every year from 1982 to 1993. While she never led, she did finish second five times in that span. When she won the U.S. Women's Open and the Women's British Open in 1992, she became the first golfer to win both in the same year.

Sheehan played on the U.S. Solheim Cup team five times (1990, 1992, 1994, 1996, 2002) and captained the team in 2002 and 2003.

Sheehan also hosts the Patty Sheehan & Friends, which is a tournament on the Legends Tour. Patty Sheehan & Friends helps aid women and children's charities all across Northern Nevada.

== Personal life ==
In 1989, Sheehan suffered a loss personally when her home and possessions were destroyed in the Loma Prieta earthquake.

Sheehan became one of the first LPGA players to publicly announce that she was a lesbian. Sheehan and her partner Rebecca Gaston have two children.

In June 2020, in honor of the 50th anniversary of the first LGBTQ Pride parade, Queerty named her among the fifty heroes "leading the nation toward equality, acceptance, and dignity for all people".

== Awards and honors ==
- Sheehan is a member of the National High School Hall of Fame.
- In 1980, Sheehan earned the Honda Sports Award in the golf category. The award is bestowed to the top female collegiate golfer.
- Sheehan is also a member of the Collegiate Golf Hall of Fame.
- In 1981, Sheehan earned LPGA Rookie of the Year honors.
- In 1983, she won LPGA Tour Player of the Year award.
- In 1984, Sheehan earned the LPGA's Vare Trophy, given to the player with the lowest scoring average over the course of the season.
- In 1987, she was one of several athletes named Sports Illustrated Sportsman of the Year.
- In 1993, Sheehan was inducted into the World Golf Hall of Fame.
- In 2002, Sheehan earned the LPGA's Patty Berg Award, bestowed to an individual who "exemplifies diplomacy, sportsmanship, goodwill and contributions to the game of golf."

== Professional wins (41) ==
=== LPGA Tour wins (35) ===
Legend
LPGA Tour major championships (6)
Other LPGA Tour (29)

No.	Date	Tournament	Winning score	Margin of victory	Runner(s)-up
1	Nov 8, 1981	Mazda Japan Classic	−9 (73-69-71=213)	4 strokes	(United States) Beth Daniel
2	Apr 25, 1982	Orlando Lady Classic	−7 (70-69-70=209)	Playoff	(United States) Kathy Postlewait
3	Sep 26, 1982	Safeco Classic	−12 (68-69-69-70=276)	1 stroke	(United States) JoAnne Carner
4	Oct 3, 1982	Inamori Classic	−12 (68-70-69-69=276)	4 strokes	(United States) Joyce Kazmierski
5	May 29, 1983	Corning Classic	−16 (70-70-69-63=272)	8 strokes	(United States) Cindy Hill
6	Jun 12, 1983	**LPGA Championship**	−9 (68-71-74-66=279)	2 strokes	(United States) Sandra Haynie
7	Aug 14, 1983	Henredon Classic	−16 (65-70-71-66=272)	4 strokes	(United States) JoAnne Carner
8	Sep 26, 1983	Inamori Classic	−7 (68-70-71=209)	2 strokes	(United States) Juli Inkster
9	Feb 5, 1984	Elizabeth Arden Classic	−8 (71-68-69-72=280)	2 strokes	(United States) Sherri Turner
10	Jun 3, 1984	**LPGA Championship**	−16 (71-70-63-68=272)	10 strokes	(United States) Pat Bradley (United States) Beth Daniel
11	Jun 10, 1984	McDonald's Kids Classic	−7 (65-72-74-70=281)	2 strokes	(United States) Amy Alcott
12	Aug 12, 1984	Henredon Classic	−11 (67-70-72-68=277)	1 stroke	(United States) JoAnne Carner (United States) Dot Germain
13	Feb 10, 1985	Sarasota Classic	−10 (69-71-72-66=278)	1 stroke	(United States) Nancy Lopez
14	Apr 21, 1985	J&B Scotch Pro-Am	−13 (67-65-71-72=275)	2 strokes	(United States) Alice Miller
15	Feb 9, 1986	Sarasota Classic	−9 (68-69-71-71=279)	3 strokes	(United States) Pat Bradley (United States) Juli Inkster
16	Feb 26, 1986	Kyocera Inamori Classic	−10 (69-71-68-70=278)	1 stroke	(United States) Pat Bradley
17	Apr 23, 1986	Konica San Jose Classic	−4 (71-70-71=212)	Playoff	(United States) Amy Alcott (United States) Betsy King (Japan) Ayako Okamoto
18	Feb 14, 1988	Sarasota Classic	−6 (71-72-72-67=282)	3 strokes	(United States) JoAnne Carner
19	Nov 2, 1988	Mazda Japan Classic	−10 (72-67-67=206)	Playoff	(Sweden) Liselotte Neumann
20	Jun 4, 1989	Rochester International	−10 (68-73-66-71=278)	Playoff	(Japan) Ayako Okamoto
21	Jan 21, 1990	The Jamaica Classic	−1 (69-68-75=212)	3 strokes	(United States) Pat Bradley (United States) Lynn Connelly (United States) Jane Geddes
22	Jun 10, 1990	McDonald's Championship	−9 (70-67-68-70=275)	1 stroke	(United States) Pat Bradley (United States) Elaine Crosby
23	Jun 24, 1990	Rochester International	−17 (72-64-68-67=271)	4 strokes	(United States) Amy Alcott
24	Sep 9, 1990	Ping-Cellular One Golf Championship	−8 (70-71-67=208)	1 stroke	(United States) Danielle Ammaccapane
25	Sep 16, 1990	Safeco Classic	−18 (69-65-66-70=270)	9 strokes	(United States) Deb Richard
26	Feb 23, 1991	Orix Hawaiian Ladies Open	−9 (68-69-70=207)	3 strokes	(United States) Pat Bradley
27	Jun 28, 1992	Rochester International	−19 (70-65-63-71=269)	9 strokes	(United States) Nancy Lopez
28	Jul 5, 1992	Jamie Farr Toledo Classic	−4 (70-73-66=209)	1 stroke	(United States) Brandie Burton (United States) Heather Drew (United States) Tammie Green (United States) Deb Richard
29	Jul 26, 1992	**U.S. Women's Open**	−4 (69-72-70-69=280)	Playoff	(United States) Juli Inkster
30	Mar 21, 1993	Standard Register PING	−17 (70-70-65-70=275)	5 strokes	(Canada) Dawn Coe-Jones (United States) Kris Tschetter
31	Jun 13, 1993	**Mazda LPGA Championship**	−9 (70-72-69-68=279)	1 stroke	(United States) Lauri Merten
32	Jul 21, 1994	**U.S. Women's Open**	−7 (66-71-69-71=277)	1 stroke	(United States) Tammie Green
33	Jun 18, 1995	Rochester International	−10 (73-66-69-70=278)	4 strokes	(United States) Sherri Steinhauer
34	Sep 17, 1995	Safeco Classic	−14 (68-65-70-71=274)	2 strokes	(United States) Emilee Klein
35	Mar 31, 1996	**Nabisco Dinah Shore**	−7 (71-72-67-71=281)	1 stroke	(United States) Meg Mallon (United States) Kelly Robbins (Sweden) Annika Sörenstam

LPGA Tour playoff record (5–7)

No.	Year	Tournament	Opponent(s)	Result
1	1981	Florida Lady Citrus	(United States) Donna Caponi (United States) Beth Daniel (United States) Cindy Hill (United States) Patti Rizzo	Daniel won with birdie on second extra hole Hill, Rizzo, and Sheehan eliminated by par on first hole
2	1982	Orlando Lady Classic	(United States) Kathy Postlewait	Won with par on fourth extra hole
3	1982	Corning Classic	(United States) Sandra Spuzich	Lost to par on first extra hole
4	1985	Samaritan Turquoise Classic	(United States) Betsy King	Lost to eagle on first extra hole
6	1985	Nestle World Championship of Women's Golf	(United States) Amy Alcott	Lost to birdie on second extra hole
6	1986	Konica San Jose Classic	(United States) Amy Alcott (United States) Betsy King (Japan) Ayako Okamoto	Sheehan won with birdie on first extra hole
7	1987	**Nabisco Dinah Shore**	(United States) Betsy King	Lost to par on second extra hole
8	1988	Rochester International	(Taiwan) Mei-Chi Cheng (United States) Nancy Lopez	Cheng won with birdie on second extra hole Sheehan eliminated by par on first hole
9	1988	Mazda Japan Classic	(Sweden) Liselotte Neumann	Won with birdie on first extra hole
10	1989	Rochester International	(Japan) Ayako Okamoto	Won with birdie on first extra hole
11	1990	The Phar-Mor in Youngstown	(United States) Beth Daniel	Lost to birdie on first extra hole
12	1992	**U.S. Women's Open**	(United States) Juli Inkster	Won 18-hole playoff (Sheehan:72, Inkster:74)

LPGA majors are shown in bold.

=== Ladies European Tour wins (1) ===
- 1992 (1) Weetabix Women's British Open

Note: Sheehan won the Women's British Open once before it became co-sanctioned by the LPGA Tour in 1994 and recognized as a major championship by the LPGA Tour in 2001.

=== LPGA of Japan Tour wins (3) ===
- 1981 (1) Mazda Japan Classic^{1}
- 1988 (1) Mazda Japan Classic^{1}
- 1992 (1) Daikin Orchid Ladies

^{1}Co-sanctioned by the LPGA Tour

=== Legends Tour wins (3) ===
- 2002 Copps Great Lakes Classic
- 2005 BJ's Charity Championship (with Pat Bradley; tie with Cindy Rarick and Jan Stephenson)
- 2006 World Ladies Senior Open

=== Other wins (1) ===
- 1994 JCPenney/LPGA Skins Game

== Major championships ==
=== Wins (6) ===
Year	Championship	Winning score	Margin	Runner(s)-up
1983	LPGA Championship	−9 (68-71-74-66=279)	2 strokes	(United States) Sandra Haynie
1984	LPGA Championship	−16 (71-70-63-68=272)	10 strokes	(United States) Pat Bradley, (United States) Beth Daniel
1992	U.S. Women's Open	−4 (69-72-70-69=280)	Playoff^{1}	(United States) Juli Inkster
1993	Mazda LPGA Championship	−9 (70-72-69-68=279)	1 stroke	(United States) Lauri Merten
1994	U.S. Women's Open	−7 (66-71-69-71=277)	1 stroke	(United States) Tammie Green
1996	Nabisco Dinah Shore	−7 (71-72-67-71=281)	1 stroke	(United States) Meg Mallon, (United States) Kelly Robbins, (Sweden) Annika Sörenstam

^{1}In an 18-hole playoff, Sheehan 72, Inkster 74.

== Team appearances ==
Amateur

- Curtis Cup (representing the United States): 1980 (winners)

Professional

- Solheim Cup (representing the United States): 1990 (winners), 1992, 1994 (winners), 1996 (winners), 2002 (non-playing captain, winners), 2003 (non-playing captain)
- Handa Cup (representing the United States): 2006 (winners), 2007 (winners), 2008 (winners), 2009 (winners), 2010 (winners), 2011 (winners), 2012 (tie, Cup retained)

== See also ==
- List of golfers with most LPGA Tour wins
- List of golfers with most LPGA major championship wins

Awards
Preceded by Lynette Woodard	Flo Hyman Memorial Award; 1994	Succeeded by Mary Lou Retton
