= 2009 LPGA Tour =

Golf tour season

2009 LPGA Tour season
- Duration: January 24, 2009 – November 23, 2009
- Number of official events: 28
- Most wins: 3 (Mexico) Lorena Ochoa, (South Korea) Jiyai Shin
- Money leader: (South Korea) Jiyai Shin
- Rolex Player of the Year: (Mexico) Lorena Ochoa
- Vare Trophy: (Mexico) Lorena Ochoa
- Rookie of the Year: (South Korea) Jiyai Shin

The 2009 LPGA Tour was a series of weekly golf tournaments for elite female golfers from around the world that took place from February through November 2009. The tournaments were sanctioned by the United States–based Ladies Professional Golf Association (LPGA).

2009 saw a reduction in both the number of tournaments and the total prize money on the Tour. Official prize money was $47.6 million, the lowest total in since 2005. There were 28 official tournaments, the lowest number since at least 2004.

Rookie Jiyai Shin topped the money list, earning $1,807,334. In addition Shin took Rookie of the Year honors. Shin and Lorena Ochoa each won three tournaments during the season. Ochoa also won the Player of the Year trophy for the fourth consecutive year and the Vare Trophy for the lowest scoring average, also for the fourth consecutive year.

Anna Nordqvist was runner-up in the Rookie of the Year race, topping off a season that began with her having only conditional status on the LPGA Tour. She won the fifth tournament in which she played in 2009, the McDonald's LPGA Championship, a major, and also won the season-ending LPGA Tour Championship, ending the season 15th on the official money list.

The four major championships were won by: Brittany Lincicome (Kraft Nabisco Championship), Anna Nordqvist (LPGA Championship), Eun-Hee Ji (U.S. Women's Open), and Catriona Matthew (Women's British Open). All major winners were first-time major winners. Matthew won her the British Open 10 weeks after giving birth to her second child.

The LPGA experienced a turn-over in leadership in 2009, when commissioner Carolyn Bivens resigned under pressure from players in July. At the time of Bivens' resignation, the tour had only 14 events committed for the 2010 schedule, having failed to sign key long-term tournaments, notably the LPGA Corning Classic. On October 28, the LPGA board of directors announced that marketing executive Michael Whan had been hired as the permanent replacement for Bivens and would assume his duties in January 2010.

== Tournament schedule and results ==
The number in parentheses after winners' names show the player's total number wins in official money individual events on the LPGA Tour, including that event.

Date	Tournament	Location	Winner	1st prize ($)
Jan 25	HSBC LPGA Brasil Cup*	Brazil	(Scotland) Catriona Matthew (n/a)	100,000
Feb 14	SBS Open at Turtle Bay	Hawaii	(United States) Angela Stanford (4)	180,000
Mar 1	Honda LPGA Thailand	Thailand	(Mexico) Lorena Ochoa (25)	217,500
Mar 8	HSBC Women's Champions	Singapore	(South Korea) Jiyai Shin (4)	300,000
Mar 22	MasterCard Classic	Mexico	(United States) Pat Hurst (6)	195,000
Mar 29	J Golf Phoenix LPGA International	Arizona	(Australia) Karrie Webb (36)	225,000
Apr 5	**Kraft Nabisco Championship**	California	(United States) Brittany Lincicome (3)	300,000
Apr 26	Corona Championship	Mexico	(Mexico) Lorena Ochoa (26)	195,000
May 10	Michelob ULTRA Open at Kingsmill	Virginia	(United States) Cristie Kerr (12)	330,000
May 17	Sybase Classic	New Jersey	(South Korea) Ji Young Oh (2)	300,000
May 24	LPGA Corning Classic	New York	(Taiwan) Yani Tseng (2)	225,000
Jun 7	LPGA State Farm Classic	Illinois	(South Korea) In-Kyung Kim (2)	255,000
Jun 14	**McDonald's LPGA Championship**	Maryland	(Sweden) Anna Nordqvist (1)	300,000
Jun 28	Wegmans LPGA	New York	(South Korea) Jiyai Shin (5)	300,000
Jul 5	Jamie Farr Owens Corning Classic	Ohio	(South Korea) Eunjung Yi (1)	210,000
Jul 12	**U.S. Women's Open**	Pennsylvania	(South Korea) Eun-Hee Ji (2)	585,000
Jul 26	Evian Masters	France	(Japan) Ai Miyazato (1)	487,500
Aug 2	**Ricoh Women's British Open**	England	(Scotland) Catriona Matthew (3)	335,000
Aug 23	Solheim Cup	Illinois	United States	n/a
Aug 30	Safeway Classic	Oregon	(South Korea) M. J. Hur (1)	255,000
Sep 6	CN Canadian Women's Open	Alberta	(Norway) Suzann Pettersen (6)	412,500
Sep 13	P&G Beauty NW Arkansas Championship	Arkansas	(South Korea) Jiyai Shin (6)	270,000
Sep 20	Samsung World Championship	California	(South Korea) Na Yeon Choi (1)	250,000
Sep 27	CVS/pharmacy LPGA Challenge	California	(Sweden) Sophie Gustafson (5)	165,000
Oct 4	Navistar LPGA Classic	Alabama	(Mexico) Lorena Ochoa (27)	195,000
Nov 1	Hana Bank-KOLON Championship	South Korea	(South Korea) Na Yeon Choi (2)	255,000
Nov 8	Mizuno Classic	Japan	(South Korea) Bo Bae Song (1) (Note: Song was not an LPGA member in 2009.)	210,000
Nov 10	Wendy's 3-Tour Challenge*	Nevada	LPGA Team	500,000
Nov 15	Lorena Ochoa Invitational	Mexico	(United States) Michelle Wie (1)	220,000
Nov 23 (Note: Due to inclement weather, the event was shortened to 54 holes, and the final round was delayed a day from its scheduled date of November 22.)	LPGA Tour Championship	Texas	(Sweden) Anna Nordqvist (2)	225,000

An asterisk next to a tournament name means that the event is unofficial.
Tournaments in bold are majors.

== Leaders ==
Money List leaders

Rank	Player	Country	Earnings ($)	Events
1	Jiyai Shin	South Korea	1,807,334	25
2	Cristie Kerr	United States	1,519,722	25
3	Ai Miyazato	Japan	1,517,149	22
4	Lorena Ochoa	Mexico	1,489,395	22
5	Suzann Pettersen	Norway	1,369,717	23
6	Na Yeon Choi	South Korea	1,341,078	26
7	Yani Tseng	Taiwan	1,293,755	27
8	In-Kyung Kim	South Korea	1,238,396	25
9	Paula Creamer	United States	1,151,864	24
10	Angela Stanford	United States	1,081,916	21

Full 2009 Official Money List - navigate to "2009"

Scoring Average leaders

Rank	Player	Country	Average
1	Lorena Ochoa	Mexico	70.16
2	Jiyai Shin	South Korea	70.26
3	Cristie Kerr	United States	70.28
4	Ai Miyazato	Japan	70.33
5	Yani Tseng	Taiwan	70.44

Full 2009 Scoring Average List - navigate to "2009", then "Scoring Average"

== Award winners ==
The three competitive awards given out by the LPGA each year are:

- The Rolex Player of the Year is awarded based on a formula in which points are awarded for top-10 finishes and are doubled at the LPGA's four major championships. The points system is: 30 points for first; 12 points for second; nine points for third; seven points for fourth; six points for fifth; five points for sixth; four points for seventh; three points for eighth; two points for ninth and one point for 10th.
  - 2009 Winner: (Mexico) Lorena Ochoa. Runner-up: (South Korea) Jiyai Shin
- The Vare Trophy, named for Glenna Collett-Vare, is given to the player with the lowest scoring average for the season.
  - 2009 Winner: (Mexico) Lorena Ochoa. Runner-up: (South Korea) Jiyai Shin
- The Louis Suggs Rolex Rooke of the Year Award is awarded to the first-year player on the LPGA Tour who scores the highest in a points competition in which points are awarded at all full-field domestic events and doubled at the LPGA's four major championships. The points system is: 150 points for first; 80 points for second; 75 points for third; 70 points for fourth; and 65 points for fifth. After fifth place, points are awarded in increments of three, beginning at sixth place with 62 points. Rookies who make the cut in an event and finish below 41st each receive five points. The award is named after Louise Suggs, one of the founders of the LPGA.
  - 2009 Winner: (South Korea) Jiyai Shin. Runner-up: (Sweden) Anna Nordqvist

== See also ==
- 2009 in golf
- 2009 Duramed Futures Tour
- 2009 Ladies European Tour
