= 1993 LPGA Championship =

Coordinates: 39.015°N 77.152°W

Tournament information
- Dates: June 10–13, 1993
- Location: Bethesda, Maryland
- Course: Bethesda Country Club
- Tour: LPGA Tour
- Format: Stroke play - 72 holes

Statistics
- Par: 71
- Length: 6,261 yards (5,725 m)
- Cut: 145 (+3)
- Prize fund: $1.0 million
- Winner's share: $150,000

Champion
- (United States) Patty Sheehan
- 275 (−9)

Location in the United States
Location in Maryland

The 1993 LPGA Championship was the 39th LPGA Championship, played June 10–13 at Bethesda Country Club in Bethesda, Maryland, a suburb northwest of Washington, D.C.

Patty Sheehan won the fourth of her six major titles, one stroke ahead of runner-up Lauri Merten. She trailed by two strokes after entering the final round, and it was her third and final win at the LPGA Championship, with previous victories in 1983 and 1984.

This was the last of four consecutive LPGA Championships at Bethesda Country Club.

== Final leaderboard ==
Sunday, June 13, 1993

Place	Player	Score	To par	Money ($)
1	(United States) Patty Sheehan	68-68-70-69=275	−9	150,000
2	(United States) Lauri Merten	73-70-66-67=276	−8	93,093
3	(United States) Barb Bunkowsky	68-70-69-70=277	−7	67,933
T4	(United States) Tammie Green	71-69-69-70=279	−5	40,130
T4	(United States) Betsy King	72-66-72-69=279	−5	40,130
T4	(United States) Michelle McGann	73-68-68-70=279	−5	40,130
T4	(United States) Patti Rizzo	72-69-67-71=279	−5	40,130
T8	(United States) Trish Johnson	68-73-69-70=280	−4	23,651
T8	(United States) Cathy Johnston-Forbes	68-68-70-74=280	−4	23,651
T8	(United States) Nancy Scranton	74-68-72-66=280	−4	23,651
