= 1989 du Maurier Classic =

Coordinates: 45.444039°N 73.830811°W

The 1989 du Maurier Classic was contested from June 29 to July 2 at Beaconsfield Golf Club. It was the 17th edition of the du Maurier Classic, and the 11th edition as a major championship on the LPGA Tour.

This event was won by Tammie Green.

== Final leaderboard ==
| Place | Player | Score | To par | Money (US$) |
|---|---|---|---|---|
| 1 | (United States) Tammie Green | 68-69-70-72=279 | −9 | 90,000 |
| T2 | (United States) Pat Bradley | 69-75-69-67=280 | −8 | 48,000 |
| T2 | (United States) Betsy King | 67-69-74-70=280 | −8 | 48,000 |
| T4 | (United States) Amy Alcott | 70-70-72-69=281 | −7 | 26,000 |
| T4 | (United States) Penny Hammel | 71-71-68-71=281 | −7 | 26,000 |
| T4 | (United States) Patty Sheehan | 69-74-69-69=281 | −7 | 26,000 |
| T7 | (United States) Beth Daniel | 71-69-71-71=282 | −6 | 16,650 |
| T7 | (United States) Nancy Scranton | 70-74-70-68=282 | −6 | 16,650 |
| 9 | (United States) Nancy Lopez | 72-67-72-72=283 | −5 | 14,100 |
| T10 | (United States) JoAnne Carner | 73-71-72-68=284 | −4 | 10,740 |
| T10 | (Canada) Dawn Coe | 71-73-73-67=284 | −4 | 10,740 |
| T10 | (United States) Nina Foust | 75-73-68-68=284 | −4 | 10,740 |
| T10 | (United States) Jane Geddes | 69-71-70-74=284 | −4 | 10,740 |
| T10 | (United States) Colleen Walker | 71-70-73-70=284 | −4 | 10,740 |
