= 1996 Nabisco Dinah Shore =

Coordinates: 33.798°N 116.433°W

Tournament information
- Dates: March 28–31, 1996
- Location: Rancho Mirage, California
- Courses: Mission Hills Country Club; Dinah Shore Tourn. Course
- Tour: LPGA Tour
- Format: Stroke play - 72 holes

Statistics
- Par: 72
- Length: 6,460 yards (5,907 m)
- Field: 126 players, 80 after cut
- Cut: 149 (+5)
- Prize fund: $900,000
- Winner's share: $135,000

Champion
- (United States) Patty Sheehan
- 281 (−7)

Location in the United States
Location in California

The 1996 Nabisco Dinah Shore was a women's professional golf tournament, held March 28–31 at Mission Hills Country Club in Rancho Mirage, California. This was the 25th edition of the Nabisco Dinah Shore, and the fourteenth as a major championship.

Patty Sheehan won her only Nabisco Dinah Shore, one stroke ahead of runners-up Meg Mallon, Kelly Robbins, and Annika Sörenstam. She sank a 7-foot (2 m) putt for par on the final hole to avoid a four-way playoff and win the last of her six major titles.

== Final leaderboard ==
Sunday, March 31, 1996

Place	Player	Score	To par	Money ($)
1	(United States) Patty Sheehan	71-72-67-71=281	−7	135,000
T2	(United States) Meg Mallon	71-70-71-70=282	−6	64,158
T2	(United States) Kelly Robbins	71-72-71-68=282	−6	64,158
T2	(Sweden) Annika Sörenstam	67-72-73-70=282	−6	64,158
T5	(United States) Brandie Burton	75-67-68-73=283	−5	32,305
T5	(United States) Amy Fruhwirth	71-73-68-71=283	−5	32,305
T5	(Australia) Karrie Webb	72-70-70-71=283	−5	32,305
8	(United States) Hollis Stacy	69-71-74-70=284	−4	23,550
9	(United States) Kris Tschetter	71-74-70-70=285	−3	21,285
T10	(United States) Tracy Hanson	69-69-74-74=286	−2	16,212
T10	(United States) Rosie Jones	72-67-75-72=286	−2	16,212
T10	(Sweden) Liselotte Neumann	73-69-75-69=286	−2	16,212
T10	(United States) Deb Richard	73-71-73-69=286	−2	16,212
T10	(United States) Val Skinner	71-71-71-70=286	−2	16,212
