= 1996 LPGA Tour =

Golf tour season

1996 LPGA Tour season
- Duration: January 11, 1996 – November 24, 1996
- Number of official events: 34
- Most wins: 4 (England) Laura Davies, (United States) Dottie Pepper, (Australia) Karrie Webb
- Money leader: (Australia) Karrie Webb
- Player of the Year: (England) Laura Davies
- Vare Trophy: (Sweden) Annika Sörenstam
- Rookie of the Year: (Australia) Karrie Webb

The 1996 LPGA Tour was the 47th season since the LPGA Tour officially began in 1950. The season ran from January 11 to November 24. The season consisted of 34 official money events. Laura Davies, Dottie Pepper and Karrie Webb won the most tournaments, four each. Webb led the money list with earnings of $1,002,000, the first player to win over $1 million in a season.

The season saw the first winner's share over $200,000, at the U.S. Women's Open. There were four first-time winners in 1996: Mayumi Hirase, Emilee Klein, Caroline Pierce, and Joan Pitcock.

The tournament results and award winners are listed below.

== Tournament results ==
The following table shows all the official money events for the 1996 season. "Date" is the ending date of the tournament. The numbers in parentheses after the winners' names are the number of wins they had on the tour up to and including that event. Majors are shown in bold.

Date	Tournament	Location	Winner	Score	Purse ($)	1st prize ($)
Jan 14	Chrysler-Plymouth Tournament of Champions	Florida	(Sweden) Liselotte Neumann (6)	275 (−13)	725,000	117,500
Jan 21	HealthSouth Inaugural	Florida	(Australia) Karrie Webb (2)	209 (−7)	450,000	67,500
Feb 24	Cup Noodles Hawaiian Ladies Open	Hawaii	(United States) Meg Mallon (7)	212 (−4)	600,000	90,000
Mar 17	Ping/Welch's Championship	Arizona	(Sweden) Liselotte Neumann (7)	276 (−12)	450,000	67,500
Mar 24	Standard Register PING	Arizona	(England) Laura Davies (12)	284 (−8)	700,000	105,000
Mar 31	**Nabisco Dinah Shore**	California	(United States) **Patty Sheehan (35)**	281 (−7)	900,000	135,000
Apr 7	Twelve Bridges LPGA Classic	California	(United States) Kelly Robbins (4)	273 (−11)	500,000	75,000
Apr 21	Chick-fil-A Charity Championship	Georgia	(United States) Barb Mucha (4)	208 (−8)	550,000	82,500
Apr 28	Sara Lee Classic	Tennessee	(United States) Meg Mallon (8)	210 (−6)	600,000	90,000
May 5	Sprint Titleholders Championship	Florida	(Australia) Karrie Webb (3)	272 (−16)	1,200,000	180,000
May 12	**McDonald's LPGA Championship**	Delaware	(England) **Laura Davies (13)**	213 (E)	1,200,000	180,000
May 26	LPGA Corning Classic	New York	(United States) Rosie Jones (7)	276 (−12)	600,000	90,000
Jun 2	**U.S. Women's Open**	North Carolina	(Sweden) **Annika Sörenstam (4)**	272 (−8)	1,200,000	212,500
Jun 9	Oldsmobile Classic	Michigan	(United States) Michelle McGann (3)	272 (−16)	600,000	90,000
Jun 16	Edina Realty LPGA Classic	Minnesota	(Sweden) Liselotte Neumann (8)	207 (−9)	550,000	82,500
Jun 23	Rochester International	New York	(United States) Dottie Pepper (11)	206 (−10)	600,000	90,000
Jun 30	ShopRite LPGA Classic	New Jersey	(United States) Dottie Pepper (12)	202 (−11)	750,000	112,500
Jul 7	Jamie Farr Kroger Classic	Ohio	(United States) Joan Pitcock (1)	204 (−9)	575,000	86,250
Jul 14	Youngstown-Warren LPGA Classic	Ohio	(United States) Michelle McGann (4)	200 (−16)	600,000	90,000
Jul 21	Friendly's Classic	Massachusetts	(United States) Dottie Pepper (13)	279 (−9)	500,000	75,000
Jul 28	Michelob Light Heartland Classic	Missouri	(United States) Vicki Fergon (3)	276 (−12)	550,000	82,500
Aug 4	**du Maurier Classic**	Canada	(England) **Laura Davies (14)**	277 (−11)	1,000,000	150,000
Aug 11	PING/Welch's Championship	Massachusetts	(United States) Emilee Klein (1)	277 (−15)	500,000	75,000
Aug 18	Weetabix Women's British Open	England	(United States) Emilee Klein (2)	277 (−15)	850,000	124,000
Aug 25	Star Bank LPGA Classic	Ohio	(England) Laura Davies (15)	204 (−12)	550,000	82,500
Sep 2	State Farm Rail Classic	Illinois	(United States) Michelle McGann (5)	202 (−14)	575,000	86,250
Sep 8	Safeway LPGA Golf Championship	Oregon	(United States) Dottie Pepper (14)	202 (−14)	550,000	82,500
Sep 15	Safeco Classic	Washington	(Australia) Karrie Webb (4)	277 (−11)	550,000	82,500
Sep 29	Fieldcrest Cannon Classic	North Carolina	(England) Trish Johnson (3)	270 (−18)	500,000	75,000
Oct 5	JAL Big Apple Classic	New York	(England) Caroline Pierce (1)	211 (−2)	725,000	108,750
Oct 13	CoreStates Betsy King Classic	Pennsylvania	(Sweden) Annika Sörenstam (5)	270 (−18)	600,000	90,000
Oct 20	Samsung World Championship of Women's Golf	South Korea	(Sweden) Annika Sörenstam (6)	274 (−14)	500,000	125,000
Nov 3	Toray Japan Queens Cup	Japan	(Japan) Mayumi Hirase (1)	212 (−4)	750,000	112,500
Nov 24	ITT LPGA Tour Championship	Nevada	(Australia) Karrie Webb (5)	272 (−16)	700,000	150,000

== Awards ==
Award	Winner	Country
Money winner	Karrie Webb	Australia
Scoring leader (Vare Trophy)	Annika Sörenstam (2)	Sweden
Player of the Year	Laura Davies	England
Rookie of the Year	Karrie Webb	Australia
