= 1984 LPGA Championship =

Coordinates: 39.349°N 84.278°W

Tournament information
- Dates: May 31 – June 3, 1984
- Location: Mason, Ohio
- Courses: Jack Nicklaus Golf Center; Grizzly Course
- Tour: LPGA Tour
- Format: Stroke play - 72 holes

Statistics
- Par: 72
- Length: 6,298 yards (5,759 m)
- Cut: 151 (+7)
- Prize fund: $250,000
- Winner's share: $37,500

Champion
- (United States) Patty Sheehan
- 272 (−16)

Location in the United States
Location in Ohio

The 1984 LPGA Championship was the 30th LPGA Championship, played May 31 to June 3 at Jack Nicklaus Golf Center at Kings Island in Mason, Ohio, a suburb northeast of Cincinnati.

Defending champion Patty Sheehan shot 131 (−13) on the weekend to win the second of her three LPGA Championships, ten strokes ahead of runners-up Pat Bradley and Beth Daniel.

== Final leaderboard ==
Sunday, June 3, 1984

Place	Player	Score	To par	Money ($)
1	(United States) Patty Sheehan	71-70-63-68=272	−16	37,500
T2	(United States) Pat Bradley	71-72-70-69=282	−6	19,375
T2	(United States) Beth Daniel	71-73-70-68=282	−6	19,375
4	(United States) Patti Rizzo	74-71-68-70=283	−5	13,750
5	(Canada) Lisa Walters	72-72-71-69=284	−4	11,250
6	(Australia) Penny Pulz	72-72-70-72=286	−2	9,375
T7	(United States) Juli Inkster	75-71-72-69=287	−1	5,811
T7	(United States) Betsy King	72-67-76-72=287	−1	5,811
T7	(Japan) Ayako Okamoto	72-71-74-70=287	−1	5,811
T7	(United States) Alice Ritzman	73-69-74-71=287	−1	5,811
T7	(United States) Robin Walton	73-69-75-70=287	−1	5,811
