= Meg Mallon =

American professional golfer (born 1963)

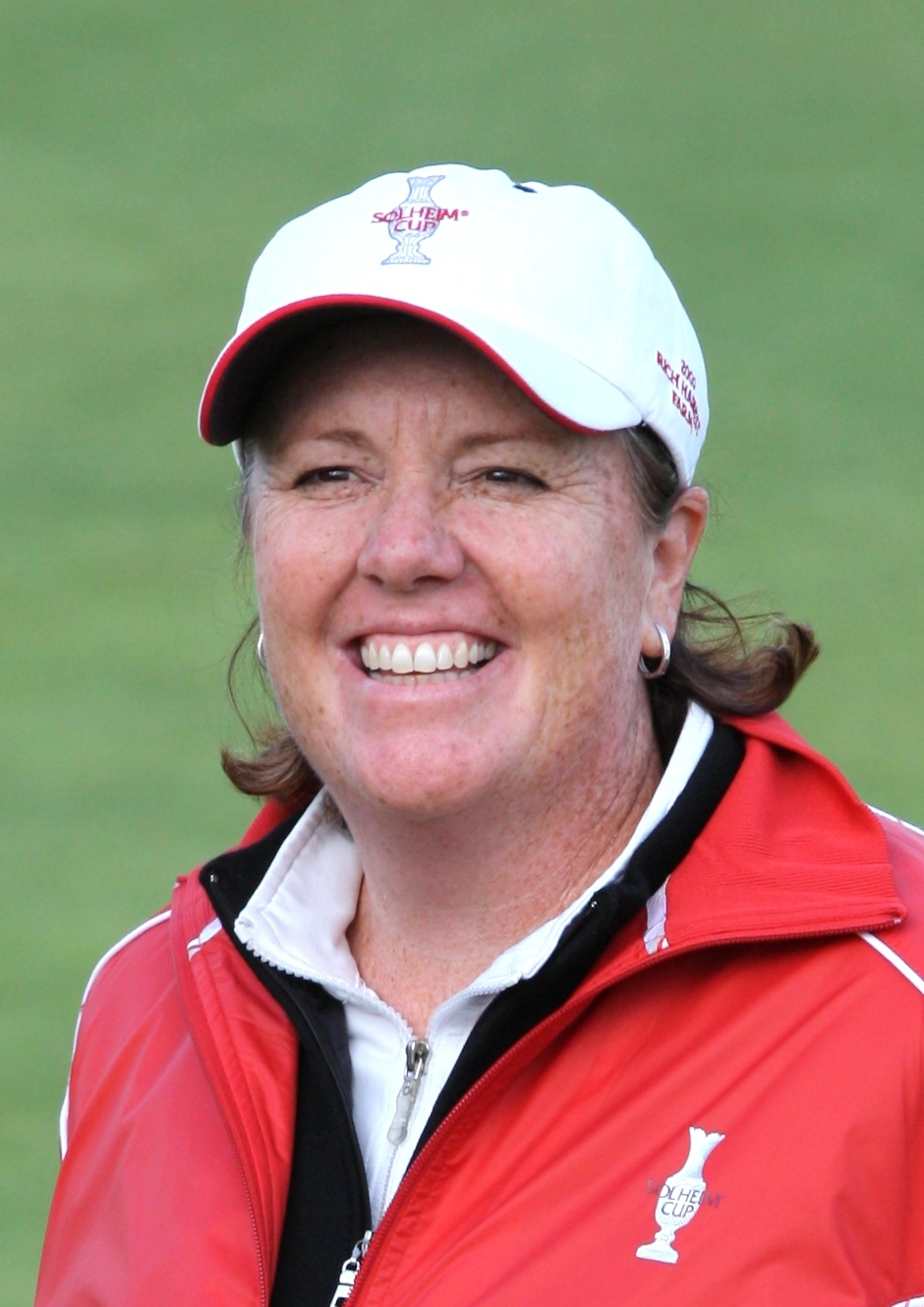
- Mallon in 2009

Personal information
- Nationality: United States
- Born: April 14, 1963 (age 63) Natick, Massachusetts, U.S.
- Height: 5 ft 6 in (1.68 m)
- Life partner: Beth Daniel

Career
- Sport: Golf
- College: Ohio State University
- Turned professional: 1987
- Former tour: LPGA Tour (1987–2010)
- Professional wins: 20

Number of wins by tour
- LPGA Tour: 18
- Other: 2

Best results in LPGA major championships (wins: 4)
- Chevron Championship: 2nd/T2: 1996, 1999
- Women's PGA C'ship: Won: 1991
- U.S. Women's Open: Won: 1991, 2004
- du Maurier Classic: Won: 2000
- Women's British Open: T8: 2002

Achievements and awards
- World Golf Hall of Fame: 2017 (member page)
- GWAA Female Player of the Year: 1991
- LPGA William and Mousie Powell Award: 1999

Meg Mallon (born April 14, 1963) is an American professional golfer. She became a member of the LPGA Tour in 1987 and won 18 LPGA Tour events, including four major championships, during her career. Mallon was inducted into the World Golf Hall of Fame in 2017.

== Early life and amateur career ==
Mallon was born on April 14, 1963, in Natick, Massachusetts. She started playing golf at the age of 7. She won the Michigan Amateur Championship title in 1983. She attended Mercy High School in Farmington Hills, Michigan.

Mallon attended Ohio State University, where she earned All-Conference honors from 1984 to 1985 and was the runner-up at the 1985 Big Ten Championship.

== Professional career ==
Mallon joined the LPGA Tour in 1987. Her breakthrough year was 1991, when she won four times. Two of her victories were majors, the Mazda LPGA Championship and the U.S. Women's Open. She was also named Female Player of the Year by the Golf Writers Association of America and Most Improved Player by Golf Digest. She would win two more majors, the du Maurier Classic in 2000 and her second U.S. Women's Open in 2004. She also won the season-ending ADT Championship in 2003.

Mallon won a total of 18 events on the tour, including four major championships. She also had nine top-10 placings on the money list, her best being second in 1991.

Mallon played for the United States in the Solheim Cup eight times: in 1992, 1994, 1996, 1998, 2000, 2002, 2003, and 2005. She served as an assistant team captain in 2009. She is the team captain in 2013.

Mallon was inducted into the Ohio State Athletic Hall of Fame in 1996, the Michigan Golf Hall of Fame in 2002, and the Michigan Sports Hall of Fame in 2008. She was recognized during the LPGA's 50th Anniversary in 2000 as one of the LPGA's top-50 players and teachers. She was a non-voting member of the LPGA Tour Player Executive Committee in 1999, 2004, and 2008.

Mallon announced her retirement from professional golf on July 7, 2010, shortly before the start of the 2010 U.S. Women's Open. She was inducted into the Palm Beach County Hall of Fame in 2011.

In 2003 during the second round of the Welch's/Fry's Championship, Mallon became the first player in LPGA history to shoot a 60, one stroke off the LPGA Tour's all-time record of 59 set by Annika Sörenstam in 2001. She is tied for second in the LPGA's all-time records for most career aces.

== Professional wins (20) ==
=== LPGA Tour wins (18) ===
Legend
LPGA Tour major championships (4)
Other LPGA Tour (14)

No.	Date	Tournament	Winning score	Margin of victory	Runner(s)-up
1	Feb 4, 1991	Oldsmobile LPGA Classic	−12 (66-70-69-71=276)	2 strokes	(United States) Dana Lofland
2	Jun 30, 1991	Mazda LPGA Championship	−10 (68-68-71-67=274)	1 stroke	(United States) Pat Bradley (Japan) Ayako Okamoto
3	Jul 14, 1991	U.S. Women's Open	−1 (70-75-71-67=283)	2 strokes	(United States) Pat Bradley
4	Oct 6, 1991	Daikyo World Championship	−3 (73-72-71=216)	5 strokes	(United States) Dottie Mochrie
5	Mar 14, 1993	PING/Welch's Championship (Tucson)	−16 (67-66-70-69=272)	1 stroke	(United States) Betsy King
6	May 9, 1993	Sara Lee Classic	−11 (70-71-64=205)	Playoff	(Canada) Tina Tombs
7	Feb 24, 1996	Cup Noodles Hawaiian Ladies Open	−4 (74-70-68=212)	1 stroke	(Australia) Karrie Webb
8	Apr 28, 1996	Sara Lee Classic	−6 (70-71-69=210)	2 strokes	(United States) Stephanie Farwig (Scotland) Pamela Wright
9	Aug 9, 1998	Star Bank LPGA Classic	−17 (64-66-68=199)	Playoff	(United States) Dottie Pepper
10	Jan 24, 1999	Naples LPGA Memorial	−16 (69-67-69-67=272)	1 stroke	(Sweden) Helen Alfredsson (United States) Kelly Robbins
11	May 16, 1999	Sara Lee Classic	−17 (66-65-68=199)	1 stroke	(Sweden) Annika Sörenstam (United States) Kris Tschetter
12	Jun 11, 2000	Wegmans Rochester International	−8 (74-67-72-67=280)	2 strokes	(Australia) Wendy Doolan
13	Aug 13, 2000	du Maurier Classic	−6 (73-68-72-69=282)	1 stroke	(United States) Rosie Jones
14	Aug 18, 2002	Bank of Montreal Canadian Women's Open	−4 (71-71-69-73=284)	3 strokes	(Australia) Michelle Ellis (Scotland) Catriona Matthew (United States) Michele Redman
15	Nov 23, 2003	ADT Championship	−7 (71-71-72-67=281)	1 stroke	(Sweden) Annika Sörenstam
16	Jul 4, 2004	U.S. Women's Open	−10 (73-69-67-65=274)	2 strokes	(Sweden) Annika Sörenstam
17	Jul 11, 2004	BMO Financial Group Canadian Women's Open	−18 (65-70-65-70=270)	4 strokes	(United States) Beth Daniel
18	Aug 8, 2004	Jamie Farr Owens Corning Classic	−7 (66-69-74-68=277)	1 stroke	(South Korea) Se Ri Pak (England) Karen Stupples

LPGA Tour playoff record (2–1)

No.	Year	Tournament	Opponent(s)	Result
1	1992	The Phar-Mor in Youngstown	(United States) Donna Andrews (United States) Beth Daniel (United States) Betsy King	King won with birdie on first extra hole
2	1993	Sara Lee Classic	(Canada) Tina Tombs	Won with birdie on third extra hole
3	1998	Star Bank LPGA Classic	(United States) Dottie Pepper	Won with par on first extra hole

=== Other wins (1) ===
- 1998 JCPenney Classic (with Steve Pate)

=== Legends Tour wins (1) ===
- 2014 Walgreens Charity Championship

== Major championships ==
=== Wins (4) ===
Year	Championship	Winning score	Margin	Runner(s)-up
1991	LPGA Championship	−10 (68-68-71-67=274)	1 stroke	(United States) Pat Bradley, (Japan) Ayako Okamoto
1991	U.S. Women's Open	−1 (70-75-71-67=283)	2 strokes	(United States) Pat Bradley
2000	du Maurier Classic	−6 (73-68-72-69=282)	1 stroke	(United States) Rosie Jones
2004	U.S. Women's Open	−10 (73-69-67-65=274)	2 strokes	(Sweden) Annika Sörenstam

=== Results timeline ===
Tournament	1986	1987	1988	1989
Kraft Nabisco Championship				
LPGA Championship			T61	T29
U.S. Women's Open	CUT		T44	CUT
du Maurier Classic				T59

Tournament	1990	1991	1992	1993	1994	1995	1996	1997	1998	1999	2000
Kraft Nabisco Championship	T9	T30	5	T49	T11	T16	T2	CUT	T16	2	3
LPGA Championship	T20	1	T26	T45	T11	T15	T10	T22	T6	T11	T17
U.S. Women's Open	T9	1	4	21	T6	2	T19	T43	CUT	T5	T2
du Maurier Classic	CUT	T23	T13	T64	T4	T12	4	T30	T4	T66	1

Tournament	2001	2002	2003	2004	2005	2006	2007	2008	2009	2010
Kraft Nabisco Championship	T28	T36	T33	T48	T50	T66	73	T15		CUT
LPGA Championship	T17	T12	T27	16	T33		CUT	CUT	CUT	CUT
U.S. Women's Open	T30	T22	CUT	1	T13	CUT	CUT	T58	CUT	
Women's British Open ^	CUT	T8	T37	CUT	CUT	CUT	68			

^ The Women's British Open replaced the du Maurier Classic as an LPGA major in 2001.

Win
Top 10
Did not play

CUT = missed the half-way cut.
"T" indicates a tie for a place.

=== Summary ===
Tournament	Wins	2nd	3rd	Top-5	Top-10	Top-25	Events	Cuts made
Kraft Nabisco Championship	0	2	1	4	5	9	20	18
LPGA Championship	1	0	0	1	3	12	22	18
U.S. Women's Open	2	2	0	6	8	12	23	16
du Maurier Classic	1	0	0	4	4	7	12	11
Women's British Open	0	0	0	0	1	1	7	3
Totals	4	4	1	15	21	41	84	66

- Most consecutive cuts made – 26 (1990 U.S. Open – 1996 du Maurier Classic)
- Longest streak of top-10s – 3 (1998 du Maurier Classic – 1999 U.S. Open)

== U.S. national team appearances ==
Professional

- Solheim Cup: 1992, 1994 (winners), 1996 (winners), 1998 (winners), 2000, 2002 (winners), 2003, 2005 (winners), 2013 (non-playing captain)
- World Cup: 2005
- Handa Cup: 2010 (winners), 2011 (winners), 2014 (winners), 2015 (winners)

== See also ==
- List of golfers with most LPGA Tour wins
- List of golfers with most LPGA major championship wins
