= 2000 du Maurier Classic =

Coordinates: 45.4154°N 75.7655°W

The 2000 du Maurier Classic was contested from August 10–13 at Royal Ottawa Golf Club. It was the 28th edition of the du Maurier Classic, first held in 1973, and the 22nd and final edition as a major championship on the LPGA Tour. Following Imperial Tobacco Canada being forced to withdraw its sponsorship of the tournament because of Tobacco Act regulations in the country, the LPGA stripped the tournament of major status and replaced it with the Women's British Open in the UK.

This event was won by Meg Mallon.

== Final leaderboard ==
Place	Player	Score	To par	Money (US$)
1	(United States) Meg Mallon	73-68-72-69=282	−6	180,000
2	(United States) Rosie Jones	74-70-71-68=283	−5	111,711
3	(Sweden) Annika Sörenstam	69-69-72-74=284	−4	81,519
4	(United States) Diana D'Alessio	67-73-73-72=285	−3	63,404
T5	(United States) Juli Inkster	72-68-74-72=286	−2	46,797
T5	(Canada) Lorie Kane	72-67-71-76=286	−2	46,797
T7	(United States) Laura Diaz	71-69-77-72=289	+1	30,192
T7	(United States) Becky Iverson	74-74-71-70=289	+1	30,192
T7	(South Korea) Se Ri Pak	69-76-72-72=289	+1	30,192
T7	(Australia) Karrie Webb	71-72-76-70=289	+1	30,192
