= Kelly Robbins =

American professional golfer (born 1969)

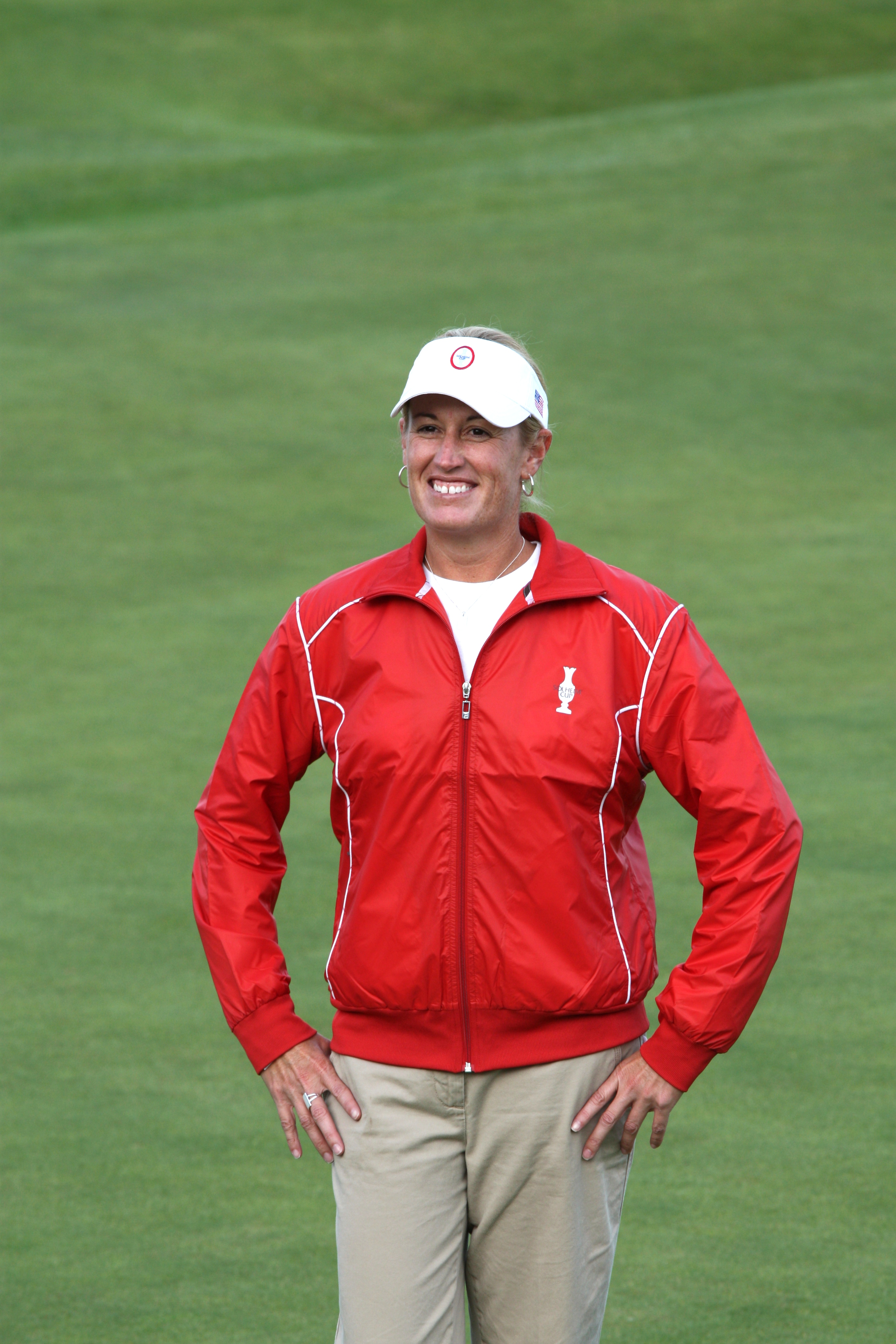

Personal information
- Full name: Kelly Robbins
- Nationality: United States
- Born: September 29, 1969 (age 57) Mount Pleasant, Michigan, U.S.
- Height: 5 ft 9 in (1.75 m)

Career
- Sport: Golf
- College: University of Tulsa
- Turned professional: 1992
- Former tour: LPGA Tour (joined 1992)
- Professional wins: 12

Number of wins by tour
- LPGA Tour: 9
- Other: 3

Best results in LPGA major championships (wins: 1)
- Chevron Championship: T2: 1996
- Women's PGA C'ship: Won: 1995
- U.S. Women's Open: T2: 2003
- du Maurier Classic: T3: 1997
- Women's British Open: T32: 2001

Kelly Robbins (born September 29, 1969) is an American former professional golfer. She became a member of the LPGA Tour in 1992 and won nine LPGA Tour events, including one major championship, during her career.

== Early life and amateur career ==
In 1969, Robbins was born in Mount Pleasant, Michigan. She started playing golf at the age of 8.

Robbins attended the University of Tulsa where she was a member of the NCAA Championship team in 1988. Throughout her collegiate career, she won seven individual titles and twice was named a First-Team All-American. In 1991, she was honored as the NCAA Co-Player of the Year along with Annika Sörenstam and was the North and South Women's Amateur winner.

== Professional career ==
In 1992, Robbins joined the LPGA Tour. She qualified for the tour on her first attempt. She won nine tournaments on the tour, including one major, the 1995 McDonald's LPGA Championship. She was most successful in the mid-1990s, finishing in the top-10 on the money list four years in a row, from 1994 to 1997. In 2005, she only played two LPGA Tour events due to a back injury. She retired from competitive golf in 2007.

In 2008, was named co-assistant captain of the 2009 U.S. Solheim Cup team.

== Professional wins (12) ==
=== LPGA Tour wins (9) ===
Legend
LPGA Tour major championships (1)
Other LPGA Tour (8)

No.	Date	Tournament	Winning score	Margin of victory	Runner(s)-up
1	May 30, 1993	LPGA Corning Classic	−11 (70-68-70-69=277)	Playoff	(England) Alison Nicholas
2	Jul 10, 1994	Jamie Farr Toledo Classic	−9 (69-70-65=204)	Playoff	(United States) Tammie Green
3	May 14, 1995	McDonald's LPGA Championship	−10 (66-68-72-68=274)	1 stroke	(England) Laura Davies
4	Apr 7, 1996	Twelve Bridges LPGA Classic	−11 (73-68-68-64=273)	Playoff	(United States) Val Skinner
5	Feb 9, 1997	Diet Dr Pepper National Pro-Am	−17 (66-69-69-67=271)	Playoff	(United States) Emilee Klein
6	Jul 6, 1997	Jamie Farr Kroger Classic	−19 (67-64-67-67=265)	8 strokes	(United States) Tammie Green
7	Jan 18, 1998	HealthSouth Inaugural	−7 (76-67-66=209)	2 strokes	(United States) Meg Mallon
8	Oct 11, 1998	Lifetime's AFLAC Tournament of Champions	−12 (66-73-67-70=276)	4 strokes	(United States) Juli Inkster
9	Jan 17, 1999	HealthSouth Inaugural	−11 (70-71-64=205)	1 stroke	(United States) Tina Barrett (Australia) Karrie Webb

LPGA Tour playoff record (4–3)

No.	Year	Tournament	Opponent(s)	Result
1	1993	LPGA Corning Classic	(England) Alison Nicholas	Won with par on first extra hole
2	1994	Jamie Farr Toledo Classic	(United States) Tammie Green	Won with birdie on first extra hole
3	1996	Twelve Bridges LPGA Classic	(United States) Val Skinner	Won with birdie on fifth extra hole
4	1997	Diet Dr Pepper National Pro-Am	(United States) Emilee Klein	Won with par on second extra hole
5	1997	Standard Register PING	(England) Laura Davies	Lost to par on first extra hole
6	1997	Samsung World Championship of Women's Golf	(Sweden) Helen Alfredsson (United States) Juli Inkster	Inkster won with birdie on first extra hole
7	2003	U.S. Women's Open	(United States) Hilary Lunke (United States) Angela Stanford	Lunke won 18-hole playoff (Lunke:70, Stanford:71, Robbins:73)

=== Other wins (3) ===
- 1994 Diner's Club Matches (with Tammie Green)
- 1995 Diner's Club Matches (with Tammie Green)
- 1997 Gillette Tour Challenge Championship (with Jim Colbert and Nick Price)

== Major championships ==
=== Wins (1) ===
Year	Championship	Winning score	Margin	Runner-up
1995	McDonald's LPGA Championship	−10 (66-68-72-68=274)	1 stroke	(England) Laura Davies

=== Results timeline ===
Tournament	1991	1992	1993	1994	1995	1996	1997	1998	1999	2000
Kraft Nabisco Championship				T6	T27	T2	T3	T42	4	T17
LPGA Championship		T22	T50	CUT	1	T18	T11	T9	66	T12
U.S. Women's Open	T59	T55	T26	T9	T13	T58	3	CUT	T30	T9
du Maurier Classic		T13	T30	T7	CUT	CUT	T3	CUT	T31	T40

Tournament	2001	2002	2003	2004	2005	2006	2007
Kraft Nabisco Championship	T24	T58	T42	T33	WD	CUT	
LPGA Championship	T17	T22	CUT	T49		CUT	CUT
U.S. Women's Open	T12	T12	T2	3		CUT	
Women's British Open ^	T32	T35	T50	CUT			

^ The Women's British Open replaced the du Maurier Classic as an LPGA major in 2001

Win
Top 10
Did not play

CUT = missed the half-way cut
WD = withdrew
"T" = tied for place

=== Summary ===
Tournament	Wins	2nd	3rd	Top-5	Top-10	Top-25	Events	Cuts made
Kraft Nabisco Championship	0	1	1	3	4	6	13	11
LPGA Championship	1	0	0	1	2	8	15	11
U.S. Women's Open	0	1	2	3	5	8	15	13
du Maurier Classic	0	0	1	1	2	3	9	6
Women's British Open	0	0	0	0	0	0	4	3
Totals	1	2	4	8	13	25	56	44

- Most consecutive cuts made – 17 (1999 Nabisco – 2003 Nabisco)
- Longest streak of top-10s – 2 (twice)

== Team appearances ==
Professional

- Solheim Cup (representing the United States): 1994 (winners), 1996 (winners), 1998 (winners), 2000, 2002 (winners), 2003
