= Greater Washington Open =

Golf tournament formerly on the LPGA Tour

The Greater Washington Open was a golf tournament on the LPGA Tour from 1988 to 1989. It was played at the Bethesda Country Club in Bethesda, Maryland.

== Winners ==
- 1989 Beth Daniel
- 1988 Ayako Okamoto
