= Cheng Mei-chi =

Taiwanese professional golfer (born 1959)

Personal information
- Nickname: Magic
- Nationality: Taiwan
- Born: 1 November 1959 (age 67) Tainan, Taiwan
- Height: 5 ft 6 in (1.68 m)

Career
- Sport: Golf
- Turned professional: 1984
- Former tours: LPGA of Japan Tour (1985–2002); LPGA Tour (1988–1991)
- Professional wins: 9

Number of wins by tour
- LPGA Tour: 1
- LPGA of Japan Tour: 2
- Ladies Asian Golf Tour: 2

Best results in LPGA major championships
- Chevron Championship: CUT: 1989, 1990, 1991
- Women's PGA C'ship: T15: 1988
- U.S. Women's Open: T19: 1988
- du Maurier Classic: T19: 1988

Cheng Mei-chi (born 1 November 1959) is a Taiwanese former professional golfer who played on the LPGA of Japan Tour and the LPGA Tour.

== Career ==
Cheng won twice on the LPGA of Japan Tour and once on the LPGA Tour in 1988.

== Professional wins (9) ==
this list is incomplete

=== LPGA Tour wins (1) ===
No.	Date	Tournament	Winning score	Margin of victory	Runners-up
1	12 Jun 1988	Rochester International	−1 (71-77-66-73=287)	Playoff	(United States) Nancy Lopez (United States) Patty Sheehan

LPGA Tour playoff record (1–0)

No.	Year	Tournament	Opponents	Result
1	1988	Rochester International	(United States) Nancy Lopez (United States) Patty Sheehan	Won with birdie on second extra hole Sheehan eliminated by par on first hole

=== LPGA of Japan Tour wins (2) ===
- 1996 Mitsubishi Electric Ladies Golf Tournament
- 1999 Sankyo Lady Cup

=== Ladies Asian Golf Tour wins (2) ===
- 1986 Tainan Open
- 1995 Taiwan Open
