= Safeco Classic =

Golf tournament formerly on the LPGA Tour

Coordinates: 47.378°N 122.157°W

Tournament information
- Location: Kent, Washington, U.S.
- Established: 1982
- Course: Meridian Valley C.C.
- Par: 72
- Length: 6,241 yards (5,707 m)
- Tour: LPGA Tour
- Format: Stroke play - 72 holes
- Prize fund: $650,000
- Month played: September
- Final year: 1999

Tournament record score
- Aggregate: 270 Patty Sheehan (1990)
- To par: –18 as above

Final champion
- (Sweden) Maria Hjorth

Location in the United States
Location in Washington

The Safeco Classic (often styled as the SAFECO Classic) was a women's professional golf tournament on the LPGA Tour in the Seattle area, sponsored by Safeco Insurance. It was played 18 times, from 1982 to 1999, at Meridian Valley Country Club in Kent, Washington, usually in mid-September, the week following the Safeway Classic in Portland.

With the opening of the Seattle Mariners' Safeco Field in Seattle in July 1999, Safeco entered a 20-year, $40 million agreement for the naming rights of the new major league baseball stadium. Safeco ended its sponsorship of the LPGA event in October 1999 and a new sponsor did not emerge.

Multiple winners of the 72-hole event were Patty Sheehan (1982, 1990, 1995), Juli Inkster (1983, 1988), and Karrie Webb (1996, 1997).

== Winners ==
| Year | Dates | Champion | Country | Winning score | To par | Margin of victory | Purse ($) | Winner's share ($) |
|---|---|---|---|---|---|---|---|---|
| 1999 | Sep 16–19 | Maria Hjorth | Sweden | 271 | −17 | 2 strokes | 650,000 | 97,500 |
| 1998 | Sep 10–13 | Annika Sörenstam | Sweden | 273 | −15 | 5 strokes | 600,000 | 90,000 |
| 1997 | Sep 11–14 | Karrie Webb (2) | Australia | 272 | −16 | 1 stroke | 550,000 | 82,500 |
| 1996 | Sep 12–15 | Karrie Webb | Australia | 277 | −11 | 2 strokes | 550,000 | 82,500 |
| 1995 | Sep 14–17 | Patty Sheehan (3) | United States | 274 | −14 | 2 strokes | 500,000 | 75,000 |
| 1994 | Sep 15–18 | Deb Richard | United States | 276 | −12 | 1 stroke | 500,000 | 75,000 |
| 1993 | Sep 16–19 | Brandie Burton | United States | 274 | −14 | 1 stroke | 450,000 | 67,500 |
| 1992 | Sep 17–20 | Colleen Walker | United States | 277 | −11 | 2 strokes | 450,000 | 67,500 |
| 1991 | Sep 19–22 | Pat Bradley | United States | 280 | −8 | Playoff | 400,000 | 60,000 |
| 1990 | Sep 13–16 | Patty Sheehan (2) | United States | 270 | −18 | 9 strokes | 300,000 | 45,000 |
| 1989 | Sep 14–17 | Beth Daniel | United States | 273 | −15 | 6 strokes | 300,000 | 45,000 |
| 1988 | Sep 15–18 | Juli Inkster (2) | United States | 278 | −10 | 3 strokes | 225,000 | 33,750 |
| 1987 | Sep 17–20 | Jan Stephenson | Australia | 277 | −11 | 1 stroke | 225,000 | 33,750 |
| 1986 | Sep 11–14 | Judy Dickinson | United States | 274 | −14 | 4 strokes | 200,000 | 30,000 |
| 1985 | Sep 12–15 | Joanne Carner | United States | 279 | −9 | 2 strokes | 200,000 | 30,000 |
| 1984 | Sep 13–16 | Kathy Whitworth | United States | 279 | −9 | 2 strokes | 175,000 | 26,250 |
| 1983 | Sep 15–18 | Juli Inkster | United States | 283 | −6 | 1 stroke | 175,000 | 26,250 |
| 1982 | Sep 23–26 | Patty Sheehan | United States | 276 | −12 | 1 stroke | 175,000 | 26,250 |

=== Multiple winners ===
Three women won this tournament more than once; all three are members of the World Golf Hall of Fame.

- 3 wins
  - Patty Sheehan: 1982, 1990, 1995
- 2 wins
  - Juli Inkster: 1983, 1988
  - Karrie Webb: 1996, 1997
