= Sharon Barrett =

American professional golfer (born 1961)

Personal information
- Nationality: United States
- Born: September 18, 1961 (age 65) San Diego, California, U.S.
- Height: 5 ft 6 in (1.68 m)

Career
- Sport: Golf
- College: University of Tulsa
- Turned professional: 1980
- Former tour: LPGA Tour (1980-2000)
- Professional wins: 1

Number of wins by tour
- LPGA Tour: 1

Best results in LPGA major championships
- Chevron Championship: T19: 1985
- Women's PGA C'ship: T9: 1986
- U.S. Women's Open: CUT: 1983-86, 1993, 1995, 1997
- du Maurier Classic: T18: 1983

Sharon Barrett (born September 18, 1961) is an American professional golfer who played on the LPGA Tour.

== Career ==
In 1961, Barrett was born in San Diego, California. She won several amateur tournaments, including the Junior World Golf Championships (Girls 15–17) in 1978 and 1979.

Barrett played college golf at the University of Tulsa. She won her first five tournaments and led her team to the AIAW championship. She left after her freshman year and joined the LPGA Tour.

Barrett won once on the LPGA Tour in 1984.

== Professional wins (1) ==
=== LPGA Tour wins (1) ===
No.	Date	Tournament	Winning score	Margin of Victory	Runner-up
1	May 7, 1984	Potamkin Cadillac Classic	-3 (68-75-70=213)	1 stroke	(South Africa) Sally Little
