= LPGA Corning Classic =

Golf tournament formerly on the LPGA Tour

Tournament information
- Location: Corning, New York
- Established: 1979
- Course: Corning Country Club
- Par: 72
- Length: 6,223 yards
- Tour: LPGA Tour
- Format: Stroke play
- Prize fund: $1,500,000 (2009)
- Final year: 2009

Tournament record score
- Aggregate: 264 Juli Inkster (2003)
- To par: -24 Juli Inkster (2003)

Final champion
- (Taiwan) Yani Tseng

The LPGA Corning Classic was an annual golf tournament for professional female golfers on the LPGA Tour. It took place every year from 1979 through 2009 at the Corning Country Club in Corning, New York.

It was one of the longest running tournaments on the LPGA Tour and the longest with a single sponsor. The title sponsor since the beginning was Corning Incorporated, an American manufacturer of glass, ceramics and related materials, primarily for industrial and scientific applications.

Production and operation of the tournament was a large community effort by the citizens of Corning. As with most tournaments on the LPGA Tour, proceeds went to charity. Beneficiaries of the Corning Classic were local hospitals and camps for disabled children. Net charitable proceeds since 1979 exceeded $5 million.

On April 20, 2009, the Classic's title sponsor, Corning Incorporated, announced it would not be able to sponsor the tournament after the 2009 tournament. The tournament's executives confirmed that efforts to secure additional sponsors had been unsuccessful and that the tournament would not continue after 2009.

Tournament names through the years:

- 1979-1983: Corning Classic
- 1984-2009: LPGA Corning Classic

== Winners ==
Year	Dates	Champion	Country	Score	Purse ($)	Winner's share ($)
2009	May 21–24	Yani Tseng	Taiwan	267 (−21)	1,500,000	225,000
2008*	May 22–25	Leta Lindley	United States	277 (−11)	1,500,000	225,000
2007	May 24–27	Young Kim	South Korea	268 (−20)	1,300,000	195,000
2006*	May 25–28	Hee-Won Han	South Korea	273 (−15)	1,200,000	180,000
2005	May 26–29	Jimin Kang	South Korea	273 (−15)	1,100,000	165,000
2004	May 27–30	Annika Sörenstam	Sweden	270 (−18)	1,000,000	150,000
2003	May 22–25	Juli Inkster	United States	264 (−24)	1,000,000	150,000
2002	May 23–26	Laura Diaz	United States	274 (−14)	1,000,000	150,000
2001	May 24–27	Carin Koch	Sweden	270 (−18)	900,000	135,000
2000*	May 25–28	Betsy King	United States	276 (−12	800,000	120,000
1999	May 27–30	Kelli Kuehne	United States	278 (−10)	750,000	112,500
1998	May 21–24	Tammie Green	United States	268 (−20)	700,000	105,000
1997*	May 22–25	Rosie Jones	United States	277 (−11)	650,000	97,500
1996	May 23–26	Rosie Jones	United States	276 (−12)	600,000	90,000
1995	May 25–28	Alison Nicholas	England	275 (−13)	550,000	82,500
1994	May 26–29	Beth Daniel	United States	278 (−10)	500,000	75,000
1993*	May 27–30	Kelly Robbins	United States	277 (−11)	500,000	75,000
1992	May 21–24	Colleen Walker	United States	276 (−12)	450,000	67,500
1991	May 23–26	Betsy King	United States	273 (−15)	400,000	60,000
1990	May 24–27	Pat Bradley	United States	274 (−10)	350,000	52,500
1989	May 25–28	Ayako Okamoto	Japan	272 (−12)	325,000	48,750
1988	May 26–29	Sherri Turner	United States	273 (−15)	325,000	48,750
1987	May 28–31	Cindy Rarick	United States	275 (−13)	275,000	41,250
1986	May 22–25	Laurie Rinker	United States	278 (−10)	250,000	37,500
1985	May 23–36	Patti Rizzo	United States	272 (−16)	250,000	37,500
1984	May 24–27	JoAnne Carner	United States	281 (−7)	150,000	22,500
1983	May 26–29	Patty Sheehan	United States	272 (−16)	150,000	22,500
1982*	May 27–30	Sandra Spuzich	United States	280 (−8)	200,000	30,000
1981	May 21–24	Kathy Hite	United States	282 (−6)	125,000	18,750
1980	May 22–25	Donna Caponi	United States	281 (−7)	125,000	18,750
1979	May 24–27	Penny Pulz	Australia	281 (−7)	100,000	15,000

* Championship won in sudden-death playoff.

== Tournament record ==
Year	Player	Score	Round
2003	Juli Inkster	62 (−10)	4th round
2009	Yani Tseng	62 (−10)	3rd round
2009	Mika Miyazato	62 (−10)	3rd round
