= Tammie Green =

American professional golfer (born 1959)

Personal information
- Nationality: United States
- Born: December 17, 1959 (age 66) Somerset, Ohio, U.S.
- Height: 5 ft 8 in (1.73 m)

Career
- Sport: Golf
- College: Marshall University
- Status: Professional
- Former tours: LPGA Tour (joined 1987); Futures Tour
- Professional wins: 21

Number of wins by tour
- LPGA Tour: 7
- LPGA of Japan Tour: 1
- Epson Tour: 11
- Other: 2

Best results in LPGA major championships (wins: 1)
- Chevron Championship: T2: 1989
- Women's PGA C'ship: T4: 1993
- U.S. Women's Open: 2nd: 1994
- du Maurier Classic: Won: 1989
- Women's British Open: DNP

Achievements and awards
- Futures Tour Player of the Year: 1985, 1986
- LPGA Tour Rookie of the Year: 1987

Tammie Green (born December 17, 1959) is an American professional golfer.

== Amateur career ==
Green was born in Somerset, Ohio. She attended Marshall University, where she played golf and basketball. She won four collegiate events, three during her senior year. She earned low-amateur honors at the 1981 LPGA Wheeling Classic.

== Professional career ==
She started her professional career on the Futures Tour, on which she won 11 tournaments and was Player of the Year in 1985 and 1986. In 1986, she qualified for the LPGA Tour by finishing tied for second at the LPGA Final Qualifying Tournament. She was LPGA Tour Rookie of the Year in 1987. She was named Most Improved Player by Golf Digest in 1989. She won seven times on the LPGA Tour, including one major championship, the 1989 du Maurier Classic. Her best placing on the money list was 5th in 1997, which was one of four top ten seasons. She played for the United States in the Solheim Cup in 1994 and 1998. She was a member of the LPGA Tour Player Executive Committee from 1992 to 1994. In 2004, she was inducted into the Ohio Golf Hall of Fame.

== Professional wins (21) ==
=== LPGA Tour wins (7) ===
Legend
LPGA Tour major championships (1)
Other LPGA Tour (6)

No.	Date	Tournament	Winning score	Margin of victory	Runner(s)-up
1	Jul 2, 1989	du Maurier Classic	−9 (68-69-70-72=279)	1 stroke	(United States) Pat Bradley (United States) Betsy King
2	Feb 7, 1993	HealthSouth Palm Beach Classic	−8 (70-69-69=208)	Playoff	(United States) JoAnne Carner
3	Jun 20, 1993	Rochester International	−12 (74-69-63-70=276)	1 stroke	(United States) Patty Sheehan
4	Jul 3, 1994	Youngstown-Warren LPGA Classic	−9 (67-69-70=206)	2 strokes	(United States) Colleen Walker
5	May 4, 1997	Sprint Titleholders Championship	−14 (66-67-69-72=274)	2 strokes	(Sweden) Annika Sörenstam
6	Jul 27, 1997	Giant Eagle LPGA Classic	−13 (64-71-68=203)	Playoff	(England) Laura Davies
7	May 24, 1998	LPGA Corning Classic	−20 (67-70-66-65=268)	7 strokes	(United States) Brandie Burton (United States) Emilee Klein

LPGA Tour playoff record (2–3)

No.	Year	Tournament	Opponent(s)	Result
1	1988	Sara Lee Classic	(United States) Patti Rizzo (United States) Sherri Turner (United States) Kim Williams	Rizzo won with birdie on fifth extra hole Green and Williams eliminated by par on first hole
2	1993	HealthSouth Palm Beach Classic	(United States) JoAnne Carner	Won with birdie on first extra hole
3	1994	Jamie Farr Toledo Classic	(United States) Kelly Robbins	Lost to birdie on first extra hole
4	1997	LPGA Corning Classic	(United States) Rosie Jones	Lost to birdie on first extra hole
5	1997	Giant Eagle LPGA Classic	(England) Laura Davies	Won with eagle on fifth extra hole

=== LPGA of Japan Tour wins (1) ===
- 1988 Karuizawa 72 Tokyu Ladies Open

=== Futures Tour wins (11) ===
- 1985 (4) Prescott Open, Decatur Visitors Bureau Classic, Seven-up Classic, Salisbury Classic
- 1986 (7) Bonita Bay Classic, Jupiter West Classic, Tapatio Springs Classic, St. George Open, Western Colorado Classic, Magna/Millikin Bank Classic, Salisbury Classic

=== Other wins (2) ===
- 1994 Diner's Club Matches (with Kelly Robbins)
- 1995 Diner's Club Matches (with Kelly Robbins)

== Major championships ==
=== Wins (1) ===
Year	Championship	Winning score	Margin	Runners-up
1989	du Maurier Classic	−9 (68-69-70-72=279)	1 stroke	(United States) Pat Bradley, (United States) Betsy King

=== Results timeline ===
Tournament	1985	1986	1987	1988	1989
Kraft Nabisco Championship				T35	T2
LPGA Championship			T41	T33	T10
U.S. Women's Open	CUT	T14	T15	T19	T43
du Maurier Classic			T53		1

Tournament	1990	1991	1992	1993	1994	1995	1996	1997	1998	1999	2000
Kraft Nabisco Championship	CUT	T11	16	T12	3	T7		T16	T24	T33	T62
LPGA Championship	T5	T56	T26	T4	T17	T8	T63	CUT	T14	T11	
U.S. Women's Open	T6	T49	T9	CUT	2	T7	T8	T7	T7	63	
du Maurier Classic	T12	T23	T6	T14	CUT	4	T44	T37	T11	T20	CUT

Tournament	2001	2002	2003	2004	2005
Kraft Nabisco Championship	T24	72	T28	T24	CUT
LPGA Championship	CUT	T25	CUT	T64	
U.S. Women's Open		CUT	CUT		
Women's British Open ^					

^ The Women's British Open replaced the du Maurier Classic as an LPGA major in 2001.

Win
Top 10
Did not play

CUT = missed the half-way cut
"T" = tied

=== Summary ===
Tournament	Wins	2nd	3rd	Top-5	Top-10	Top-25	Events	Cuts made
Kraft Nabisco Championship	0	1	1	2	3	10	17	15
LPGA Championship	0	0	0	2	4	8	17	14
U.S. Women's Open	0	1	0	1	7	10	17	13
du Maurier Classic	1	0	0	2	3	8	13	11
Women's British Open	0	0	0	0	0	0	0	0
Totals	1	2	1	7	17	36	64	53

- Most consecutive cuts made – 13 (1990 du Maurier Classic – 1993 LPGA)
- Longest streak of top-10s – 4 (1995 Nabisco – 1995 du Maurier Classic)

== Team appearances ==
Professional

- Solheim Cup (representing the United States): 1994 (winners), 1998 (winners)
