= Caroline Pierce =

English professional golfer (born 1963)

Personal information
- Full name: Caroline Pierce McMillan
- Nationality: England
- Born: 2 August 1963 (age 63) Cheshire, England
- Height: 5 ft 3.5 in (1.61 m)

Career
- Sport: Golf
- College: Houston Baptist University
- Status: Professional
- Former tours: LPGA Tour (1988–2001); Futures Tour (1987–1994)
- Professional wins: 3

Number of wins by tour
- LPGA Tour: 1
- Epson Tour: 2

Best results in LPGA major championships
- Chevron Championship: 10th: 1995
- Women's PGA C'ship: T26: 1996
- U.S. Women's Open: T21: 1997
- du Maurier Classic: T6: 1991
- Women's British Open: CUT: 2001

Caroline Pierce McMillan (born 2 August 1963) is an English professional golfer. She has played under both her maiden name, Caroline Pierce, and her married name, Caroline McMillan.

== Career ==
In 1988, she began playing on the LPGA Tour after she won the Qualifying School.

Pierce won once on the LPGA Tour< in 1996.

== Professional wins (3) ==
=== LPGA Tour wins (1) ===
No.	Date	Tournament	Winning score	Margin of victory	Runners-up
1	5 Oct 1996	JAL Big Apple Classic	–2 (72-67-72=211)	5 strokes	(United States) Tina Barrett (Australia) Karrie Webb

=== Futures Tour wins (2) ===
- 1987 First Union Classic, Lynx-Tigress Open
