= Wegmans LPGA =

Former women's golf tournament

Tournament information
- Location: Pittsford, New York, U.S.
- Established: 1977
- Course: Locust Hill Country Club
- Par: 72
- Length: 6,365 yards (5,820 m)
- Tour: LPGA Tour
- Format: Stroke play - 72 holes
- Prize fund: $2,000,000
- Month played: June
- Final year: 2009

Tournament record score
- Aggregate: 269 Patty Sheehan (1992)
- To par: –19 Patty Sheehan (1992)

Final champion
- (South Korea) Jiyai Shin

Wegmans LPGA was women's professional golf tournament on the LPGA Tour. It was played from 1977 to 2009 at the Locust Hill Country Club in Pittsford, New York.

== History ==
The tournament was originally known as the Bankers Trust Classic, a 54-hole event. From 1979 to 1981, Sarah Coventry took over sponsorship of the tournament, changed its title and extended it to 72 holes. While the tournament was The Sarah Coventry, the tournament didn't recognize the Bankers Trust as part of the tournament's history. Today it does and The Sarah Coventry prior to 1979 was held in Florida and California is regarded as the separate tournament. Nancy Lopez won the tournament for a third time at age 24 in 1981, with Locust Hill set as a par-73 at 6,155 yards (5,628 m). Wegmans Food Markets took over as the title sponsor in 1998.

Working with the Monroe County Rotary Clubs, tournament proceeds are donated to support local summer camps for disabled children. Through 2005, more than $6.6 million had been raised for these charities through the Wegmans LPGA Tournament.

In 2010, the tournament was replaced by the LPGA Championship, a major championship. Wegmans served as presenting sponsor instead of Coca-Cola in 2010, as ownership of the championship reverted from McDonald's back to the LPGA. Wegmans took over as title sponsor in 2011, with the regular (non-major) tour stop continuing on hiatus, at least through 2014. The LPGA Championship stayed in Rochester and left Locust Hill for Monroe Golf Club where it stayed until 2015. Since 2014, there has been no LPGA tournament in Rochester. In 2015 it was announced that the Symetra Tour was coming to town with the creation of the Toyota Danielle Downey Classic.

== Tournament names ==
- 1977–1978: Bankers Trust Classic
- 1979–1981: The Sarah Coventry
- 1982–1997: Rochester International
- 1998–2001: Wegmans Rochester International
- 2002–2005: Wegmans Rochester LPGA
- 2006–2009: Wegmans LPGA

== Winners ==
Year	Dates	Champion	Country	Score	To par	Purse ($)	Winner's share ($)
2009	Jun 25–28	Jiyai Shin	South Korea	271	–17	2,000,000	300,000
2008	Jun 19–22	Eun-Hee Ji	South Korea	272	–16	2,000,000	300,000
2007*	Jun 21–24	Lorena Ochoa (2)	Mexico	280	–8	1,800,000	270,000
2006	Jun 22–25	Jeong Jang	South Korea	275	–13	1,800,000	270,000
2005	Jun 16–19	Lorena Ochoa	Mexico	273	–15	1,500,000	225,000
2004	Jun 24–27	Kim Saiki	United States	274	–14	1,500,000	225,000
2003	Jun 19–22	Rachel Teske	Australia	277	–11	1,200,000	180,000
2002	Jun 20–23	Karrie Webb (2)	Australia	276	–12	1,200,000	180,000
2001	Jun 7–10	Laura Davies	England	279	–9	1,000,000	150,000
2000	Jun 8–11	Meg Mallon	United States	280	–8	1,000,000	150,000
1999	Jun 10–13	Karrie Webb	Australia	280	–8	1,000,000	150,000
1998	May 28–31	Rosie Jones (2)	United States	279	–9	700,000	105,000
1997	Jun 19–22	Penny Hammel	United States	279	–9	600,000	90,000
1996	Jun 20–23	Dottie Pepper	United States	206	–10	600,000	90,000
1995	Jun 15–18	Patty Sheehan (4)	United States	278	–10	550,000	82,500
1994	Jun 16–19	Lisa Kiggens	United States	273	–15	500,000	75,000
1993	Jun 17–20	Tammie Green	United States	276	–12	500,000	75,000
1992	Jun 25–28	Patty Sheehan (3)	United States	269	–19	400,000	60,000
1991	May 30–Jun 2	Rosie Jones	United States	276	–12	400,000	60,000
1990	Jun 21–24	Patty Sheehan (2)	United States	271	–17	400,000	60,000
1989*	Jun 1–4	Patty Sheehan	United States	278	–10	300,000	45,000
1988*	Jun 9–12	Mei-Chi Cheng	Taiwan	287	–1	300,000	45,000
1987	Jun 25–28	Deb Richard	United States	280	–8	300,000	45,000
1986	Jun 19–22	Judy Dickinson	United States	281	–7	255,000	38,250
1985	Jun 13–16	Pat Bradley (2)	United States	280	–8	255,000	38,250
1984*	Jul 19–22	Kathy Whitworth	United States	281	–7	200,000	30,000
1983*	Jun 23–26	Ayako Okamoto	Japan	282	–6	200,000	30,000
1982	Jun 24–27	Sandra Haynie	United States	276	–12	200,000	30,000
1981	Jun 25–28	Nancy Lopez (3)	United States	285	–7	125,000	18,750
1980	Jun 26–29	Nancy Lopez (2)	United States	283	–9	125,000	18,750
1979	Jun 14–17	Jane Blalock	United States	280	–12	100,000	15,000
1978	Jun 16–18	Nancy Lopez	United States	214	–5	75,000	11,250
1977	Jul 8–10	Pat Bradley	United States	213	–6	75,000	11,000

*Championship won in sudden-death playoff.

== Tournament record ==
Year	Player	Score	Round
1992	Patty Sheehan	63 (–9)	3rd
1993	Tammie Green	63 (–9)	3rd
