= 2009 in golf =

This article summarizes the highlights of professional and amateur golf in the year 2009.

== Men's professional golf ==
Major championships

- 9–12 April: The Masters - Argentina's Ángel Cabrera won his second major in a sudden death playoff over Kenny Perry (second hole) and Chad Campbell (eliminated on first playoff hole).
- 18–22 June: U.S. Open - In a tournament plagued by rain, causing most of the final round to be played on Monday, American Lucas Glover won his first major by two shots over fellow Americans Ricky Barnes, David Duval, and Phil Mickelson.
- 16–19 July: The Open Championship - In a return to Turnberry, the site of one of his legendary 1977 win, 59-year-old Tom Watson led for much of the tournament before losing to fellow-American Stewart Cink in a four hole playoff. Tiger Woods missed the cut — his second missed cut in a major as a professional.
- 13–16 August: PGA Championship - South Korean Y.E. Yang became the first Asian-born player to win a men's major championship, winning by three shots over Tiger Woods. This marked the first (and only) time that Woods failed to win a major after holding the third-round lead.

World Golf Championships

- 26 February-1 March: WGC-Accenture Match Play Championship - Australian Geoff Ogilvy defeated Paul Casey of England 4&3
- 12–15 March WGC-CA Championship - Phil Mickelson from the USA won at -19, one stroke ahead of fellow American Nick Watney.
- 6–9 August: WGC-Bridgestone Invitational - American Tiger Woods won his 7th Bridgestone Invitational and 16th WGC.
- 3–6 November: WGC-HSBC Champions - Phil Mickelson won the HSBC Champions for the second time and his second WGC of the year.

FedEx Cup playoff events - see 2009 FedEx Cup Playoffs

- 27–30 August: The Barclays - American Heath Slocum, who barely qualified for the playoffs, sank a 20-foot (6 m) par putt on the final hole to secure a one-shot win over a distinguished group made up of Ernie Els, Pádraig Harrington, Steve Stricker, and Tiger Woods.
- 4–7 September: Deutsche Bank Championship - American Steve Stricker won for the third time this season, edging out countrymen Jason Dufner and Scott Verplank by one shot.
- 10–13 September: BMW Championship - Tiger Woods won for the sixth time this season. He won by eight strokes to take the lead in the points standings into The Tour Championship.
- 24–27 September: The Tour Championship - Phil Mickelson won by three shots over Tiger Woods, whose second-place finish gave him the FedEx Cup.

Other leading PGA Tour events

- 7–10 May: The Players Championship - Henrik Stenson from Sweden won at -12, four strokes ahead of Ian Poulter.

For a complete list of PGA Tour results see 2009 PGA Tour.

Other Leading European Tour events

- 21–24 May: BMW PGA Championship - Paul Casey birdied the final two holes to capture his third win of the year and move into third place in the world rankings.
- 19–22 November: Dubai World Championship - Lee Westwood won the inaugural contest, setting a course record of 64 in the final round to win by six strokes.

For a complete list of European Tour results see 2009 European Tour.

Team events

- 24–27 September: Vivendi Trophy with Seve Ballesteros - Team Great Britain & Ireland defeated Team Continental Europe 16½–11½. This was the fifth consecutive win for Team GB&I.
- 8–11 October: Presidents Cup - The U.S. Team defeated the International Team 19½–14½. This was the Americans' third consecutive win.

Tour leaders

- PGA Tour - (United States) Tiger Woods ($10,508,163)
  - Woods also earned a $10 million bonus ($9 million up front and $1 million deferred) for winning the FedEx Cup points race.
- European Tour - (England) Lee Westwood (€4,237,762)
  - This total includes the bonus of US$1.5 million (€996,810) earned for winning the Race to Dubai.
- Japan Golf Tour - Ryo Ishikawa (¥183,524,051)
- Asian Tour - (Thailand) Thongchai Jaidee ($981,932)
- PGA Tour of Australasia - (Australia) Michael Sim (A$315,087.66)
- Sunshine Tour - (Denmark) Anders Hansen (R4,286,038.20)
- OneAsia Tour – (Australia) Scott Strange ($505,783.76)

Awards

- PGA Tour
  - FedEx Cup – Tiger Woods
  - PGA Player of the Year - Tiger Woods
  - Player of the Year (Jack Nicklaus Trophy) - Tiger Woods
  - Leading money winner (Arnold Palmer Award) - Tiger Woods
  - Vardon Trophy - Tiger Woods
  - Byron Nelson Award - Tiger Woods
  - Rookie of the Year - Marc Leishman
  - Comeback Player of the Year - Not awarded
  - Payne Stewart Award - Kenny Perry
- European Tour
  - Player of the Year - Lee Westwood
  - Rookie of the Year - Chris Wood
- Champions Tour
  - Charles Schwab Cup – Loren Roberts
  - Player of the Year - Bernhard Langer
  - Rookie of the Year - Russ Cochran
  - Comeback Player of the Year -
  - Leading money winner (Arnold Palmer Award) - (Germany) Bernhard Langer ($2,139,451)
- Nationwide Tour
  - Leading money winner - (Australia) Michael Sim ($644,142)
  - Player of the Year - (Australia) Michael Sim

Other tour results

- 2009 Asian Tour
- 2009 PGA Tour of Australasia
- 2009 Canadian Tour
- 2009 Challenge Tour
- 2009 Japan Golf Tour
- 2009 Nationwide Tour
- 2009 Sunshine Tour
- 2009 Tour de las Américas

Other happenings

- 22 February: 18-year-old New Zealander Danny Lee became the second amateur golfer to win a European Tour event, at the Johnnie Walker Classic. Lee also became the youngest ever winner on the European Tour.
- 8 September: 17-year-old Japanese golfer Ryo Ishikawa beat Rory McIlroy's record as the youngest ever golfer to reach the top 50 of the Official World Golf Rankings.
- 27 November: Tiger Woods was involved in an early morning car accident close to his Orlando, Florida home. A media storm subsequently developed around the circumstances of the accident and newspaper allegations that Woods had been having an extra-marital affair. Woods pulled out of his Chevron World Challenge tournament and admitted to 'transgressions' and apologised for letting his family down. Subsequently, after multiple women came forward alleging to have had affairs with Woods, he announced on 11 December that he would be taking an indefinite leave from competitive golf, and admitted to marital infidelity.

== Women's professional golf ==
LPGA majors

- 2–5 April: Kraft Nabisco Championship - American Brittany Lincicome won her third LPGA tournament and first major after scoring an eagle on the last hole.
- 11–14 June: LPGA Championship - Swedish rookie Anna Nordqvist won her first major and first LPGA tournament by four strokes over Lindsey Wright.
- 9–12 July: U.S. Women's Open - A birdie on the 72nd hole gave Korean Eun-Hee Ji a one-shot win over Candie Kung for her first major and second LPGA tournament title.
- 30 July-2 August: Ricoh Women's British Open - Catriona Matthew became the first Scottish woman to win a major, competing 11 weeks after giving birth to her second child.

Ladies European Tour major (in addition to the Women's British Open)

- 23–26 July: Evian Masters - Japan's Ai Miyazato defeated Sweden's Sophie Gustafson on the first hole of a sudden-death playoff for her first LPGA Tour win.

For a complete list of Ladies European Tour results see Ladies European Tour.

Additional LPGA Tour events

- 17–20 September: Samsung World Championship - Korean Na Yeon Choi won her first LPGA Tour title by one shot over Ai Miyazato of Japan.
- 19–23 November: LPGA Tour Championship - Rookie Anna Nordqvist won the rain-shortened championship, her second win of the 2009 season.

For a complete list of LPGA Tour results see LPGA Tour.

Team events

- 21–23 August: Solheim Cup - Team USA won the Cup for the third straight meeting with a 16–12 victory over Team Europe.

Money list leaders

- LPGA Tour – (South Korea) Jiyai Shin ($1,807,334)
- Ladies European Tour – (Sweden) Sophie Gustafson (€281,315)
- Duramed Futures Tour – (United States) Mina Harigae ($88,386)
- LPGA of Korea Tour – (South Korea) Hee Kyung Seo (₩663,759,286)
- LPGA of Japan Tour – Sakura Yokomine (¥175,016,384)
- Ladies Asian Golf Tour – (South Korea) Bo-Mi Suh ($48,500)
- ALPG Tour – (Australia) Katherine Hull (A$125,980)

Awards

- LPGA Tour Player of the Year – (Mexico) Lorena Ochoa claimed the title for the fourth consecutive year
- LPGA Tour Rookie of the Year – (South Korea) Jiyai Shin won over second-place finisher Anna Nordqvist
- LPGA Tour Vare Trophy – (Mexico) Lorena Ochoa won the title with a scoring average of 70.16.
- LET Player of the Year – (Scotland) Catriona Matthew
- LET Rookie of the Year – (Sweden) Anna Nordqvist clinched the title while playing only six events on the tour.

Other happenings

- 13 July: LPGA commissioner Carolyn Bivens resigned under pressure from players after four years in the job. Marsha Evans was named interim commissioner while a search was undertaken for a permanent replacement.
- 28 October: The LPGA Tour announced that Michael Whan had been hired as its new commissioner.
- 18 November: The LPGA announced that the 2010 LPGA Championship will be sponsored by Wegmans in Rochester, New York, in place of that city's annual Wegmans LPGA tour stop. The LPGA Championship used to be sponsored by McDonald's and took place in eastern Maryland.

== Senior men's professional golf ==
Senior majors

- 21–24 May: Senior PGA Championship - Playing in his first Champions Tour event, Michael Allen won by two shots over Larry Mize, becoming the first player since Jack Nicklaus in 1990 to win a major in his Champions Tour debut.
- 23–26 July: Senior British Open - American Loren Roberts won his second Senior British Open and fourth senior major in a playoff with Fred Funk and Mark McNulty.
- 30 July-2 August: U.S. Senior Open - American Fred Funk won his second senior major by six strokes over Joey Sindelar.
- 20–23 August: JELD-WEN Tradition - American Mike Reid won his second senior major in a playoff with John Cook.
- 1–4 October: Senior Players Championship - American Jay Haas won his third senior major, shooting six-under 64 in the final round to chase down Tom Watson by one shot.

Full results

- 2009 Champions Tour
- 2009 European Senior Tour

Money list leaders

- Champions Tour - German Bernhard Langer topped the money list for the second straight year with earnings of $2,139,451.
- European Senior Tour - Scotsman Sam Torrance topped the Order of Merit with earnings of €170,696.

== Amateur golf ==
- 19–22 May: NCAA Division I Women's Golf Championships - Arizona State won its seventh team championship. María Hernández of Purdue won the individual title.
- 27–30 May: NCAA Division I Men's Golf Championships - Texas A&M won its first team championship. Arkansas finished strong, coming in as a runner-up. Matt Hill of North Carolina State won the individual title.
- 14–20 June: The Amateur Championship - Sixteen-year-old Matteo Manassero of Italy became the youngest person and first Italian ever to win the event.
- 3–9 August: U.S. Women's Amateur - Korean-American Jennifer Song defeated American Jennifer Johnson 3 & 1.
- 24–30 August: U.S. Amateur - Seventeen-year-old Korean An Byeong-hun became the youngest person and first from his country to win the event.
- 12–13 September: Walker Cup - Team USA won the Cup for the third straight time, defeating Team Great Britain & Ireland 16½–9½.

== World Golf Hall of Fame inductees ==
- (United States) Dwight D. Eisenhower (Lifetime Achievement)
- (Republic of Ireland) Christy O'Connor Snr (Veterans)
- (Spain) José María Olazábal (International)
- (United States) Lanny Wadkins (PGA Tour)

== Table of results ==
This table summarizes all the results referred to above in date order.

Dates	Tournament	Status or tour	Winner
26 Feb-1 Mar	WGC-Accenture Match Play Championship	World Golf Championships	(Australia) Geoff Ogilvy
12-15 Mar	WGC-CA Championship	World Golf Championships	(United States) Phil Mickelson
2-5 Apr	Kraft Nabisco Championship	LPGA major	(United States) Brittany Lincicome
9-12 Apr	The Masters	Men's major	(Argentina) Ángel Cabrera
7–10 May	The Players Championship	PGA Tour	(Sweden) Henrik Stenson
19–22 May	NCAA Division I Women's Golf Championships	U.S. college championship	Arizona St. / María Hernández
21–24 May	BMW PGA Championship	European Tour	(England) Paul Casey
21–24 May	Senior PGA Championship	Senior major	(United States) Michael Allen
27–30 May	NCAA Division I Men's Golf Championships	U.S. college championship	Texas A&M / Matt Hill
11-14 Jun	LPGA Championship	LPGA major	(Sweden) Anna Nordqvist
14-20 Jun	The Amateur Championship	Amateur men's individual tournament	(Italy) Matteo Manassero
18-21 Jun	U.S. Open	Men's major	(United States) Lucas Glover
9-12 Jul	U.S. Women's Open	LPGA major	(South Korea) Eun-Hee Ji
16-19 Jul	The Open Championship	Men's major	(United States) Stewart Cink
23-26 Jul	Evian Masters	Ladies European Tour major and LPGA Tour regular event	(Japan) Ai Miyazato
23-26 Jul	Senior British Open	Senior major	(United States) Loren Roberts
30 Jul-2 Aug	Women's British Open	LPGA and Ladies European Tour major	(Scotland) Catriona Matthew
30 Jul-2 Aug	U.S. Senior Open	Senior major	(United States) Fred Funk
3-9 Aug	U.S. Women's Amateur	Amateur women's individual tournament	(United States) (South Korea) Jennifer Song
6-9 Aug	WGC-Bridgestone Invitational	World Golf Championships	(United States) Tiger Woods
13-16 Aug	PGA Championship	Men's major	(South Korea) Y.E. Yang
20-23 Aug	JELD-WEN Tradition	Senior major	(United States) Mike Reid
21-23 Aug	Solheim Cup	United States v Europe women's professional team event	Team USA
24-30 Aug	U.S. Amateur	Amateur men's individual tournament	(South Korea) An Byeong-hun
27-30 Aug	The Barclays	PGA Tour FedEx Cup playoff	(United States) Heath Slocum
4-7 Sep	Deutsche Bank Championship	PGA Tour FedEx Cup playoff	(United States) Steve Stricker
10-13 Sep	BMW Championship	PGA Tour FedEx Cup playoff	(United States) Tiger Woods
12-13 Sep	Walker Cup	Great Britain & Ireland v United States men's amateur team event	Team USA
17-20 Sep	Samsung World Championship	LPGA Tour	(South Korea) Na Yeon Choi
24-27 Sep	The Tour Championship	PGA Tour FedEx Cup playoff	(United States) Phil Mickelson
24-27 Sep	Vivendi Trophy with Seve Ballesteros	Great Britain & Ireland v Europe men's professional team event	(United Kingdom) (Republic of Ireland) Team Great Britain & Ireland
1-4 Oct	Senior Players Championship	Senior major	(United States) Jay Haas
8-11 Oct	Presidents Cup	USA v International men's professional team event	U.S. Team
3-6 Nov	WGC-HSBC Champions	World Golf Championships	(United States) Phil Mickelson
19-22 Nov	Dubai World Championship	European Tour	(England) Lee Westwood
19-23 Nov	LPGA Tour Championship	LPGA Tour	(Sweden) Anna Nordqvist

The following biennial events will next be played in 2010: Ryder Cup, Curtis Cup, Espirito Santo Trophy.
