= J Golf Phoenix LPGA International =

Golf tournament formerly on the LPGA Tour

Tournament information
- Location: Phoenix, Arizona, U.S.
- Established: 1980
- Tour: LPGA Tour
- Format: Stroke play - 72 holes
- Prize fund: $1.5 million
- Month played: March
- Final year: 2009

Tournament record score
- Aggregate: 261 Annika Sörenstam (2001)
- To par: −27 Annika Sörenstam (2001)

Final champion
- (Australia) Karrie Webb

Location in the United States
Location in Arizona

The J Golf Phoenix LPGA International, in full the J Golf Phoenix LPGA International Presented by Mirassou Winery, was a women's professional golf tournament in Arizona on the LPGA Tour. Founded as the "Sun City Classic" in 1980, it was held annually in the Phoenix area through 2009, making it one of the longest-lasting events on the LPGA Tour.

Tournament Golf Foundation managed the tournament since its start and continues to manage the Safeway Classic tournament on the LPGA Tour. Proceeds from the event were donated to local medical charities; over $12 million was raised during the course of the tournament.

The tournament had a variety of sponsors during its history, including Safeway Inc., a California-based supermarket chain.

It was at this tournament that Annika Sörenstam shot 59 in the second round in 2001, which stands as the record for the lowest scoring round ever shot for 18 holes in an LPGA Tour event. With thirteen birdies and no bogeys, she began the round with eight birdies, added four more over the next five holes, but managed only one over the final five. Sörenstam won the event with 261 (–27), two strokes ahead of runner-up Se Ri Pak.

The LPGA Tour returned to the Phoenix area in 2011 with the Founders Cup.

== Tournament names ==
- 1980–1981: Sun City Classic
- 1982: American Express Sun City Classic
- 1983–1985: Samaritan Turquoise Classic
- 1986: Standard Register/Samaritan Turquoise Classic
- 1987–1990: Standard Register Turquoise Classic
- 1991–2001: Standard Register PING
- 2002: PING Banner Health
- 2003 Safeway PING Presented by Yoplait
- 2004–2008: Safeway International
- 2009: J Golf Phoenix LPGA International Presented by Mirassou Winery

== Winners ==
Year	Dates	Champion	Country	Score	Venue	Purse ($)	Winner's share ($)
2009	Mar 26-29	Karrie Webb (2)	Australia	274 (−14)	Papago Golf Course	1,500,000	220,000
2008	Mar 27-30	Lorena Ochoa (2)	Mexico	266 (−22)	Superstition Mountain Golf and Country Club	1,500,000	220,000
2007	Mar 22-25	Lorena Ochoa	Mexico	270 (−18)	Superstition Mountain Golf and Country Club	1,500,000	220,000
2006	Mar 16-19	Juli Inkster	United States	273 (−15)	Superstition Mountain Golf and Country Club	1,400,000	210,000
2005	Mar 17-20	Annika Sörenstam (3)	Sweden	277 (−11)	Superstition Mountain Golf and Country Club	1,400,000	210,000
2004	Mar 18-21	Annika Sörenstam (2)	Sweden	270 (−18)	Superstition Mountain Golf and Country Club	1,200,000	180,000
2003	Mar 20-23	Se Ri Pak	South Korea	265 (−23)	Moon Valley Country Club	1,000,000	150,000
2002	Mar 14-17	Rachel Teske	Australia	281 (−7)	Moon Valley Country Club	1,000,000	150,000
2001	Mar 15-18	Annika Sörenstam	Sweden	261 (−27)	Moon Valley Country Club	1,000,000	150,000
2000	Mar 16-19	Charlotta Sörenstam	Sweden	276 (−12)	The Legacy Golf Resort	850,000	127,500
1999	Mar 18-21	Karrie Webb	Australia	274 (−14)	Moon Valley Country Club	850,000	127,500
1998	Mar 19-22	Liselotte Neumann	Sweden	279 (−13)	Moon Valley Country Club	850,000	127,500
1997	Mar 20-23	Laura Davies (4)	England	277 (−15)	Moon Valley Country Club	850,000	127,500
1996	Mar 21-24	Laura Davies (3)	England	284 (−8)	Moon Valley Country Club	700,000	105,000
1995	Mar 16-19	Laura Davies (2)	England	280 (−12)	Moon Valley Country Club	700,000	105,000
1994	Mar 17-20	Laura Davies	England	277 (−15)	Moon Valley Country Club	700,000	105,000
1993	Mar 18-21	Patty Sheehan	United States	275 (−17)	Moon Valley Country Club	700,000	105,000
1992	Mar 19-22	Danielle Ammaccapane (2)	United States	279 (−13)	Moon Valley Country Club	550,000	82,500
1991	Mar 21-24	Danielle Ammaccapane	United States	283 (−9)	Moon Valley Country Club	550,000	82,500
1990	Mar 22-25	Pat Bradley (2)	United States	280 (−12)	Moon Valley Country Club	500,000	75,000
1989	Mar 23-26	Allison Finney	United States	282 (−6)	Moon Valley Country Club	400,000	60,000
1988	Mar 24-27	Ok-Hee Ku	South Korea	281 (−7)	Moon Valley Country Club	350,000	52,500
1987	Mar 26-29	Pat Bradley	United States	286 (−6)	Moon Valley Country Club	300,000	45,000
1986	Feb 20-23	Mary Beth Zimmerman	United States	278 (−10)	Arizona Biltmore Country Club	250,000	37,500
1985	Feb 28-Mar 3	Betsy King	United States	280 (−8)	Arizona Biltmore Country Club	150,000	22,500
1984	Mar 8-11	Christa Johnson	United States	276 (−12)	Arizona Biltmore Country Club	150,000	22,500
1983 ^	Mar 3-7	Anne Marie Palli	France	205 (−14)	Arizona Biltmore Country Club	150,000	22,500
1982	Mar 4-7	Beth Daniel	United States	278 (−10)	Hillcrest Country Club	100,000	15,000
1981	Mar 12-15	Patty Hayes	United States	277 (−15)	Hillcrest Country Club	100,000	15,000
1980	Feb 28-Mar 2	Jan Stephenson	Australia	275 (−13)	Hillcrest Country Club	100,000	15,000

^ The 1983 edition was shortened to 54 holes due to rain and concluded on Monday.

== Multiple winners ==
Six players won the event more than once:

- 4 wins: Laura Davies (1994, 1995, 1996, 1997)
- 3 wins: Annika Sörenstam (2001, 2004, 2005)
- 2 wins: Pat Bradley (1987, 1990), Danielle Ammaccapane (1991, 1992), Lorena Ochoa (2007, 2008), Karrie Webb (1999, 2009)

== Course records ==
Year	Player	Score	Round	Course
2001	Annika Sörenstam	59 (−13)	2nd	Moon Valley Country Club
2008	Angela Stanford	62 (−10)	1st	Superstition Mountain Golf and Country Club - Prospector Course
2009	Jiyai Shin	66 (−6)	3rd	Papago Golf Course
