= 1983 LPGA Championship =

Coordinates: 39.349°N 84.278°W

Tournament information
- Dates: June 9–12, 1983
- Location: Mason, Ohio
- Courses: Jack Nicklaus Golf Center; Grizzly Course
- Tour: LPGA Tour
- Format: Stroke play - 72 holes

Statistics
- Par: 72
- Length: 6,277 yards (5,740 m)
- Cut: 151 (+7)
- Prize fund: $200,000
- Winner's share: $30,000

Champion
- (United States) Patty Sheehan
- 279 (−9)

Location in the United States
Location in Ohio

The 1983 LPGA Championship was the 29th LPGA Championship, played June 9–12 at Jack Nicklaus Golf Center at Kings Island in Mason, Ohio, a suburb northeast of Cincinnati.

Seven strokes back after the third round, Patty Sheehan shot a 66 (−6) to win the first of her six major titles, two strokes ahead of runner-up Sandra Haynie, the 54-hole leader.

== Final leaderboard ==
Sunday, June 12, 1983

Place	Player	Score	To par	Money ($)
1	(United States) Patty Sheehan	68-71-74-66=279	−9	30,000
2	(United States) Sandra Haynie	70-69-67-75=281	−7	19,600
3	(United States) Debbie Massey	68-74-71-70=283	−5	14,000
T4	(United States) JoAnne Carner	68-74-70-72=284	−4	9,000
T4	(United States) Christa Johnson	70-70-75-69=284	−4	9,000
T6	(United States) Pat Bradley	73-71-71-70=285	−3	6,700
T6	(United States) Vicki Tabor	71-70-71-73=285	−3	6,700
T8	(United States) Dale Eggeling	73-71-73-69=286	−2	5,400
T8	(United States) Alice Miller	70-72-73-71=286	−2	5,400
T8	(United States) Alexandra Reinhardt	67-68-75-76=286	−2	5,400
