= Patti Rizzo =

American golfer and golf instructor (born 1960)

Personal information
- Full name: Patrice M. Rizzo
- Nationality: United States
- Born: June 19, 1960 (age 66) Hollywood, Florida, U.S.
- Height: 5 ft 8 in (1.73 m)

Career
- Sport: Golf
- College: University of Miami
- Status: Professional
- Former tour: LPGA Tour (1982–1999)
- Professional wins: 15

Number of wins by tour
- LPGA Tour: 4
- LPGA of Japan Tour: 9
- Other: 2

Best results in LPGA major championships
- Chevron Championship: T8: 1986
- Women's PGA C'ship: 4th/T4: 1984, 1993
- U.S. Women's Open: 4th: 1983
- du Maurier Classic: T8: 1986, 1990

Achievements and awards
- LPGA Rookie of the Year: 1982

Patrice M. "Patti" Rizzo (born June 19, 1960) is an American professional golfer and golf instructor.

== Amateur career ==
In 1960, Rizzo was born in Hollywood, Florida. A collegiate All-American at the University of Miami, among her significant victories as an amateur were the Eastern Women's Amateur and Mexican Amateur in 1980, a year when she was also runner-up to Juli Inkster at the U.S. Women's Amateur and individual winner when the U.S. team won the 1980 Espirito Santo Trophy. Her performance in the 1980 season resulted in Golf Digest ranking her the No.1 female amateur in the U.S.

The following year, in 1981, her wins included the North and South Women's Amateur at Pinehurst and she earned medalist honors at the U.S. Women's Amateur. Golf Magazine ranked her the No. 1 collegiate player for 1981.

== Professional career ==
In 1982, Rizzo joined the LPGA Tour where she earned Rookie of the Year honors. She played on the Tour regularly for 10 years during which time she won four tournaments.

In 1991, growing disenchanted with pro golf, Rizzo quit the LPGA. After not playing any golf at all for several months, Rizzo accepted an invitation to play in a LPGA of Japan Tour event. Rizzo won it and soon afterwards accepted a one-year exemption to play the LPGA of Japan Tour. Rizzo won three tournaments in Japan in 1992, bringing her total victories there to nine.

Rizzo was the head coach of the Barry University women's golf program from 2004 until 2010 when she became coach at the University of Miami.

== Awards and honors ==
- While a student-athlete at University of Miami, Rizzo earned All-American honors multiple times.
- In 1982, she earned LPGA Rookie of the Year honors.

== Amateur wins ==
- 1980 Trans-National, Eastern Amateur, Mexican Amateur, Espirito Santo Trophy (individual winner)
- 1981 North and South Women's Amateur, South Atlantic Harder Hall Invitational

== Professional wins (15) ==
=== LPGA Tour wins (4) ===
No.	Date	Tournament	Winning score	Margin of Victory	Runner(s)-up
1	Aug 7, 1983	Boston Five Classic	−11 (66-70-73-68=277)	2 strokes	(Australia) Jane Lock
2	May 26, 1985	LPGA Corning Classic	−16 (69-68-64-71=272)	1 stroke	(Australia) Jane Crafter
3	May 1, 1988	Sara Lee Classic	−9 (70-70-67=207)	Playoff	(United States) Tammie Green (United States) Sherri Turner (United States) Kim Williams
4	Apr 9, 1989	Red Robin Kyocera Inamori Classic	−7 (73-67-68-69=277)	2 strokes	(United States) Martha Nause

LPGA Tour playoff record (1–0)

No.	Year	Tournament	Opponents	Result
1	1988	Sara Lee Classic	(United States) Tammie Green (United States) Sherri Turner (United States) Kim Williams	Won with birdie on fifth extra hole Green and Williams eliminated by par on first hole

=== LPGA of Japan Tour wins (9) ===
- 1985 (1) Daio Paper Elleair Ladies Open
- 1986 (1) Takara Invitational
- 1988 (2) Takara Invitational, Daio Paper Elleair Ladies Open
- 1989 (1) Daikin Orchid Ladies
- 1991 (1) Yukijirushi Ladies Tokai Classic
- 1992 (3) Nasu Ogawa Ladies Pro, Takara World Invitational, Fujitsu Ladies

=== Other wins (2) ===
- 1985 (1) Sun City International
- 1989 (1) Mazda Champions (with Mike Hill)

== U.S. national team appearances ==
Amateur

- Espirito Santo Trophy: 1980 (winners)
