= J&B Scotch Pro-Am =

Former golf tournament in Las Vegas, Nevada

The J&B Scotch Pro-Am was a golf tournament on the LPGA Tour from 1979 to 1985. It was played at several courses in the Las Vegas, Nevada area.

== Tournament locations ==
Years	Venue	Location
1979	Sahara Country Club	Las Vegas, Nevada
1979	Las Vegas Country Club	Las Vegas, Nevada
1980–1985	Desert Inn Golf & Country Club	Las Vegas, Nevada
1980	Paradise Valley Country Club	Henderson, Nevada

== Winners ==
J&B Scotch Pro-Am

- 1985 Patty Sheehan
- 1984 Ayako Okamoto
- 1983 Nancy Lopez
- 1982 Nancy Lopez

LPGA Desert Inn Pro-Am

- 1981 Donna Caponi

LPGA National Pro-Am

- 1980 Donna Caponi

Sahara National Pro-Am

- 1979 Nancy Lopez
