= Freedom/Orlando Classic =

Golf tournament formerly on the LPGA Tour

The Freedom/Orlando Classic was a golf tournament on the LPGA Tour from 1979 to 1984. It was played in the Orlando, Florida area: at the Rio Pinar Country Club from 1979 to 1982 and at the Cypress Creek Country Club from 1983 to 1984.

== Winners ==
Freedom/Orlando Classic

- 1984 Betsy King

Combanks Orlando Classic

- 1983 Lynn Adams

Orlando Lady Classic

- 1982 Patty Sheehan

Florida Lady Citrus

- 1981 Beth Daniel
- 1980 Donna White
- 1979 Jane Blalock
