= Planters Pat Bradley International =

Golf tournament formerly on the LPGA Tour

The Planters Pat Bradley International was a golf tournament on the LPGA Tour from 1981 to 1990. It was played at Willow Creek Country Club in High Point, North Carolina.

== Winners ==
Planters Pat Bradley International

- 1990 Cindy Rarick
- 1989 Robin Hood
- 1988 Martha Nause

Henredon Classic

- 1987 Mary Beth Zimmerman
- 1986 Betsy King
- 1985 Nancy Lopez
- 1984 Patty Sheehan
- 1983 Patty Sheehan
- 1982 JoAnne Carner
- 1981 Sandra Haynie
