= Ayako Okamoto =

Japanese professional golfer (born 1951)

Ayako Okamoto 岡本 綾子
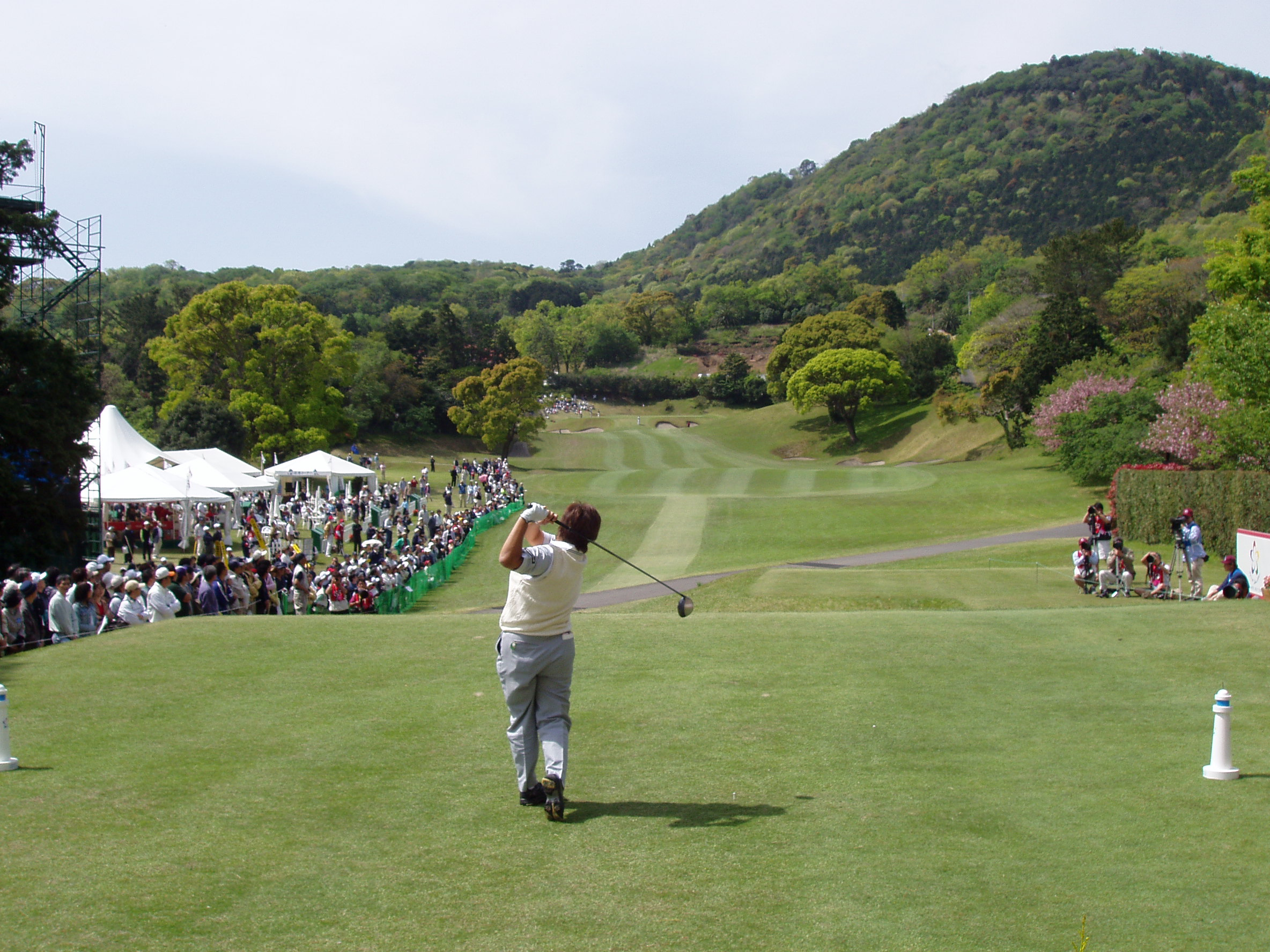

Personal information
- Nationality: Japan
- Born: 2 April 1951 (age 75) Akitsu, Hiroshima
- Height: 5 ft 5 in (1.65 m)

Career
- Sport: Golf
- Turned professional: 1975
- Former tours: LPGA of Japan Tour (1975–2005); LPGA Tour (1981–1995)
- Professional wins: 62

Number of wins by tour
- LPGA Tour: 17
- Ladies European Tour: 2
- LPGA of Japan Tour: 44

Best results in LPGA major championships
- Chevron Championship: T5: 1987
- Women's PGA C'ship: 2nd/T2: 1989, 1991
- U.S. Women's Open: T2: 1987
- du Maurier Classic: 2nd: 1984, 1986, 1987

Achievements and awards
- World Golf Hall of Fame: 2005 (member page)
- LPGA of Japan Tour leading money winner: 1981
- LPGA Tour leading money winner: 1987
- LPGA Tour Player of the Year: 1987

Ayako Okamoto (岡本 綾子, Okamoto Ayako; born 2 April 1951) is a Japanese professional golfer. She won 62 tournaments internationally, including 17 on the U.S.-based LPGA Tour in the 1980s and 1990s. She is a member of the World Golf Hall of Fame.

== Early life ==
In 1951, Okamoto was born in Akitsu, Hiroshima, now part of Higashihiroshima, Hiroshima, Japan. In her youth and early 20s she was a softball player. She was the star pitcher on the Japanese national champion in 1971. Her club team was owned by the textile company Daiwabo, where Okamoto worked.

Her employer, Daiwabo, owned a golf facility next door, and when she was 22, Okamoto finally decided to start playing golf. Although she pitched softball left-handed, she learned golf right-handed.

== Professional career ==
In 1975, Okamoto joined the LPGA of Japan Tour. Three years later, at age 25, she won the Mizuno Corporation Tournament. In 1979, at the age of 28, Okamoto won the Japan LPGA Championship and in 1981 she won eight times in Japan and topped the LPGA of Japan money list.

Okamoto was a superstar in Japan, but she decided to branch out and joined the American LPGA Tour in 1981. From 1982 through 1992, Okamoto won 17 times, her first coming at the 1982 Arizona Copper Classic. Okamoto was a consistent winner on the LPGA Tour, claiming four wins in 1987 (plus four runners-up and 17 top-10s) and three wins each in 1984 and 1988. In 1987, she led the tour's money list and earned the LPGA Tour Player of the Year award, the first non-American to do either.

The only thing Okamoto did not do in the United States was win a major. She finished as runner-up six times in major championships. Her best opportunities came in 1986, when she lost a sudden death playoff to Pat Bradley at the du Maurier Classic and in 1987 when she lost an 18-hole playoff to Laura Davies for the U.S. Women's Open crown (JoAnne Carner was also in the playoff). She was in the top-10 at the Open every year from 1983 to 1987, and in the top-10 at the LPGA Championship every year from 1984 to 1991.

Okamoto's last LPGA victory was in 1992, and 1993 was her last year to play a full or half schedule in the U.S. Okamoto returned to Japan after 1993, where she played until 2005. In addition to her 17 LPGA wins, Okamoto also won 44 times on the LPGA of Japan Tour, and twice on the Ladies European Tour.

== Awards and honors ==
- In 1981, she led the money list for the LPGA of Japan Tour
- In 1987, she led the LPGA money list and was awarded the LPGA Player of the Year.
- In 2005, she entered the World Golf Hall of Fame.
- In 2026, she was honored as a Person of Cultural Merit.

== Professional wins (62) ==
=== LPGA Tour wins (17) ===
No.	Date	Tournament	Winning score	Margin of victory	Runner(s)-up
1	28 Feb 1982	Arizona Copper Classic	−7 (70-72-70-69=281)	Playoff	(South Africa) Sally Little
2	26 Jun 1983	Rochester International	−6 (68-71-67-76=282)	Playoff	(United States) Donna White (United States) Kathy Whitworth
3	15 Apr 1984	J&B Scotch Pro-Am	−14 (70-67-71-67=275)	5 strokes	(United States) Donna White
4	17 Jun 1984	Mayflower Classic	−7 (73-67-71-70=281)	2 strokes	(United States) Judy Dickinson (United States) Donna White
5	6 Oct 1984	Hitachi Ladies British Open	−3 (71-71-70-77=289)	11 strokes	(United States) Betsy King (Scotland) Dale Reid
6	2 Feb 1986	Elizabeth Arden Classic	−8 (69-67-73-71=280)	1 stroke	(United States) Muffin Spencer-Devlin
7	7 Sep 1986	Cellular One-Ping Golf Championship	−9 (70-71-66=207)	6 strokes	(United States) Nancy Lopez (United States) Colleen Walker
8	12 Apr 1987	Kyocera Inamori Golf Classic	−13 (66-70-69-70=275)	1 stroke	(United States) Betsy King
9	17 May 1987	Chrysler-Plymouth Classic	−4 (70-74-71=215)	2 strokes	(United States) Jane Geddes (United States) Colleen Walker
10	21 Jun 1987	Lady Keystone Open	−8 (70-74-64=208)	1 stroke	(United States) Laurie Rinker
11	30 Aug 1987	Nestle World Championship	−6 (70-68-73-71=282)	1 stroke	(United States) Betsy King
12	27 Feb 1988	Orient Leasing Hawaiian Ladies Open	−3 (69-72-72=213)	1 stroke	(United States) JoAnne Carner (United States) Deb Richard
13	10 Apr 1988	San Diego Inamori Golf Classic	−12 (69-71-63-69=272)	1 stroke	(United States) Colleen Walker
14	31 Jul 1988	Greater Washington Open	−7 (69-70-67=206)	1 stroke	(United States) Connie Chillemi (United States) Beth Daniel
15	28 May 1989	LPGA Corning Classic	−12 (69-66-67-70=272)	6 strokes	(United States) Beth Daniel
16	6 May 1990	Sara Lee Classic	−6 (71-71-68=210)	1 stroke	(United States) Pat Bradley (United States) JoAnne Carner (Canada) Dawn Coe (United States) Betsy King (United States) Colleen Walker
17	7 Jun 1992	McDonald's Championship	−8 (67-69-69=205)	3 strokes	(United States) Pat Bradley (United States) Brandie Burton (United States) Deb Richard

Note: Okamoto won the Hitachi Ladies British Open (now known as the Women's British Open) before it became recognized as a major championship by the LPGA Tour in 2001.

LPGA Tour playoff record (2–4)

No.	Year	Tournament	Opponent(s)	Result
1	1982	Arizona Copper Classic	(South Africa) Sally Little	Won with birdie on second extra hole
2	1983	Rochester International	(United States) Donna White (United States) Kathy Whitworth	Won with birdie on third extra hole
3	1986	**du Maurier Classic**	(United States) Pat Bradley	Lost to birdie on first extra hole
4	1986	Konica San Jose Classic	(United States) Amy Alcott (United States) Betsy King (United States) Patty Sheehan	Sheehan won with birdie on first extra hole
5	1987	**U.S. Women's Open**	(United States) JoAnne Carner (England) Laura Davies	Lost 18-hole playoff (Davies:71, Okamoto:73, Carner:74)
6	1989	Rochester International	(United States) Patty Sheehan	Lost to par on first extra hole

LPGA majors are shown in bold.

=== LPGA of Japan Tour wins (44) ===
- 1975 (1) Mizuno Golf
- 1976 (1) All-Star
- 1977 (4) World Ladies, Tohoku Queens, Asahi Toys, Japan Ladies Professional East vs. West
- 1978 (1) KTV Ladies Classic
- 1979 (2) **Japan LPGA Championship**, Tokai Classic
- 1980 (3) Kumamoto Cyuoh Ladies, Hokuriku Queens, Saikai National Park Ladies Open
- 1981 (8) Sanin Ladies Golf, KBS Ladies, Fuji Ladies Classic, Hokuriku Queens, Stanley Ladies, Japan Ladies Professional East vs West, Miyagi TV Women's Open, Sanyo Queens
- 1982 (4) Tohato Ladies, Dunlop Ladies, **Japan LPGA Championship**, Tokai Classic
- 1983 (1) Sanyo Queens
- 1984 (1) Tsumura Itsuki Classic
- 1986 (1) Nichirei Ladies Cup
- 1987 (1) Konica Cup World Ladies
- 1989 (2) Tokai Classic, Itoki Classic
- 1990 (1) **Japan LPGA Championship**
- 1991 (3) Yamaha Cup Ladies, Karuizawa 72 Tokyu Ladies Open, Kosaido Asahi Cup
- 1992 (2) Tohato Ladies, Fujisankei Ladies Classic
- 1993 (2) **Japan Women's Open Golf Championship**, Itoen Ladies
- 1994 (3) Tohato Ladies, Itoki Classic, Kosaido Asahi Cup
- 1996 (1) Fujisankei Ladies Classic
- 1997 (1) **Japan Women's Open Golf Championship**
- 1999 (1) Katokichi Queens

Tournament in bold denotes major championships on LPGA of Japan Tour.

=== Ladies European Tour wins (2) ===
- 1984 (1) Hitachi Ladies British Open (co-sanctioned by the LPGA Tour)
- 1990 (1) Lufthansa Ladies' German Open

== Results in LPGA majors ==
Tournament	1982	1983	1984	1985	1986	1987	1988	1989	1990	1991
Nabisco Championship	–	T40	T64	T34	WD	T5	T35	CUT	T6	T6
LPGA Championship		T44	T7	T5	T3	T3	T3	2	T9	T2
U.S. Women's Open	T38	T8	T8	T8	T3	T2	T12	T11	T32	T15
du Maurier Classic		T10	2	T69	2	2	T13	T24	T31	

Tournament	1992	1993	1994	1995	1996	1997	1998	1999	2000
Nabisco Championship	T12	79	T19	T37	T48	64		CUT	T67
LPGA Championship	T15	T37	T28	CUT					
U.S. Women's Open	CUT	T7	T49	T21					
du Maurier Classic									

Top 10
Did not play

CUT = missed the half-way cut.
WD = withdrew
"T" = tied

=== Summary ===
Tournament	Wins	2nd	3rd	Top-5	Top-10	Top-25	Events	Cuts made
Nabisco Championship	0	0	0	1	3	5	17	15
LPGA Championship	0	2	3	6	8	9	13	12
U.S. Women's Open	0	1	1	2	6	10	14	13
du Maurier Classic	0	3	0	3	4	6	8	8
Totals	0	6	4	12	21	30	52	48

- Most consecutive cuts made – 25 (1982 U.S. Open – 1988 U.S. Open)
- Longest streak of top-10s – 7 (1986 LPGA – 1987 U.S. Open)

== See also ==
- List of golfers with most LPGA Tour wins
