= Samsung World Championship =

Golf tournament formerly on the LPGA Tour

Tournament information
- Location: La Jolla, California
- Established: 1980
- Courses: Torrey Pines, South Course
- Tour: LPGA Tour
- Format: Stroke play
- Prize fund: US $1,000,000 (in 2009)
- Month played: September

Current champion
- Na Yeon Choi

The Samsung World Championship was an annual golf tournament played between 1980 and 2009, for professional female golfers on the LPGA Tour. It was a limited field event, open by invitation only.

The tournament was founded in 1980 by Mark McCormack, founder of the sports management firm IMG, originally with the world's top-12 LPGA players. The field was increased to 16 players in 1996 and to 20 in 1999. Electronics manufacturer Samsung became the title sponsor in 1995.

Tournament names through the years:

- 1980: World Series of Women's Golf
- 1981: World Championship of Women's Golf
- 1982-1984: Chevrolet World Championship of Women's Golf
- 1985: Nestle World Championship of Women's Golf
- 1986-1989: Nestle World Championship
- 1990: Trophee Urban-World Championship
- 1991: Daikyo World Championship
- 1992: no tournament
- 1993-1994: World Championship of Women's Golf
- 1995-1999: Samsung World Championship of Women's Golf
- 2000-2009: Samsung World Championship

== 2009 participants ==
The 2009 championship included 20 players: the previous year's defending champion; the 2008 Vare Trophy winner; the 2008 LPGA Money Winner; the winners of the four 2009 women's major golf championships: the Kraft Nabisco Championship, McDonald's LPGA Championship, U.S. Women's Open, and Women's British Open; the leading player from the Ladies European Tour in 2009; one sponsor's exemption selected by the championship selection committee; the leading "active" LPGA Hall of Fame member on the LPGA Official Money List in 2009; and the top money winners on the LPGA Tour from the 2009 season.

The 2009 participants listed in order of qualification or invitation:

1. Paula Creamer - Defending Champion
2. Lorena Ochoa - 2008 Vare Trophy Winner, 2008 LPGA Money Leader
3. Brittany Lincicome - Winner of 2009 Kraft Nabisco Championship
4. Anna Nordqvist - Winner of 2009 LPGA Championship
5. Eun-Hee Ji - Winner of 2009 U.S. Women's Open
6. Catriona Matthew - Winner of 2009 Ricoh Women's British Open
7. Juli Inkster - Sponsor's Exemption
8. Cristie Kerr - LPGA Money Leader
9. Sophie Gustafson - LET Order of Merit Leader
10. Karrie Webb - Leading Active LPGA Hall of Fame Member
11. Jiyai Shin - Qualified from LPGA Money List
12. Ai Miyazato - Qualified from LPGA Money List
13. In-Kyung Kim - Qualified from LPGA Money List
14. Yani Tseng - Qualified from LPGA Money List
15. Suzann Pettersen - Qualified from LPGA Money List
16. Angela Stanford - Qualified from LPGA Money List
17. Kristy McPherson - Qualified from LPGA Money List
18. Na Yeon Choi - Qualified from LPGA Money List
19. Lindsey Wright - Qualified from LPGA Money List
20. Song-Hee Kim - Qualified from LPGA Money List

== Winners ==
Year	Champion	Country	Score	Tournament Location	Purse	Winner's Share
2009	Na Yeon Choi	South Korea	272 (-16)	Torrey Pines Golf Course, South Course	$1,000,000	$250,000
2008	Paula Creamer	United States	279	Half Moon Bay Golf Links, Ocean Course	$1,000,000	$250,000
2007	Lorena Ochoa	Mexico	270	Bighorn Golf Club, Canyons Course	$1,000,000	$250,000
2006	Lorena Ochoa	Mexico	272	Bighorn Golf Club, Canyons Course	$875,000	$218,750
2005	Annika Sörenstam	Sweden	270	Bighorn Golf Club, Canyons Course	$850,000	$212,500
2004	Annika Sörenstam	Sweden	270	Bighorn Golf Club, Canyons Course	$825,000	$206,250
2003	Sophie Gustafson	Sweden	274	The Players Club at the Woodlands	$800,000	$200,000
2002	Annika Sörenstam	Sweden	266	Hiddenbrooke Golf Club	$775,000	$162,000
2001	Dorothy Delasin	Philippines	277	Hiddenbrooke Golf Club	$750,000	$157,000
2000	Juli Inkster	United States	274	Hiddenbrooke Golf Club	$725,000	$152,000
1999	Se Ri Pak	South Korea	280	Rush Creek Golf Club	$700,000	$150,000
1998	Juli Inkster	United States	275	Villages in Lady Lake	$550,000	$137,000
1997	Juli Inkster	United States	280	Lakeside Country Club	$525,000	$131,000
1996	Annika Sörenstam	Sweden	274	Ildong Lakes Golf Club	$500,000	$125,000
1995	Annika Sörenstam	Sweden	282	Paradise Golf Club	$475,000	$117,500
1994	Beth Daniel	United States	274	Naples National Golf Club	$425,000	$105,000
1993	Dottie Mochrie	United States	283	Naples National Golf Club	$400,000	$102,500
1992	No tournament					
1991	Meg Mallon	United States	216	Paradise Palms Golf Club	$325,000	$100,000
1990	Cathy Gerring	United States	278	Cely Golf Club	$325,000	$100,000
1989	Betsy King	United States	275	Stouffer Pineisle Resort	$265,000	$83,500
1988	Rosie Jones	United States	270	Stouffer Pineisle Resort	$265,000	$81,500
1987	Ayako Okamoto	Japan	282	Stouffer Pineisle Resort	$250,000	$81,500
1986	Pat Bradley	United States	279	Stouffer Pineisle Resort	$240,000	$78,000
1985	Amy Alcott	United States	274	Stouffer Pineisle Resort	$200,000	$65,000
1984	Nancy Lopez	United States	281	Shaker Heights Country Club	$200,000	$65,000
1983	JoAnne Carner	United States	282	Shaker Heights Country Club	$200,000	$65,000
1982	JoAnne Carner	United States	284	Shaker Heights Country Club	$150,000	$50,000
1981	Beth Daniel	United States	284	Shaker Heights Country Club	$150,000	$50,000
1980	Beth Daniel	United States	280	The Country Club	$150,000	$46,500

== Tournament records ==
Year	Player	Score	Round	Course
2004	Grace Park	62 (-10)	1st round	Bighorn Golf Club, Canyons Course
2009	Na Yeon Choi	63 (-9)	3rd round	Torrey Pines Golf Course
