= 2013 Women's British Open =

Coordinates: 56.343°N 2.803°W

2013 Ricoh Women's British Open
Tournament information
- Dates: 1–4 August 2013
- Location: St Andrews, Scotland
- Course: Old Course
- Organized by: Ladies' Golf Union
- Tours: Ladies European Tour; LPGA Tour

Statistics
- Par: 72
- Length: 6,672 yards (6,101 m)
- Field: 144 players, 69 after cut
- Cut: 145 (+1)
- Prize fund: $2,750,000 €2,069,631 £1,803,275
- Winner's share: $402,584 €302,982 £263,989

Champion
- (United States) Stacy Lewis
- 280 (−8)

Location in Scotland
Location in Fife, Scotland

The 2013 Ricoh Women's British Open was played 1–4 August at the Old Course at St Andrews in St Andrews, Scotland. It was the 37th Women's British Open, and the 13th as a major championship on the LPGA Tour. It was the second Women's British Open at St Andrews, the first was six years earlier in 2007. ESPN televised the tournament in the United States and BBC Sport broadcast the event in the United Kingdom.

Stacy Lewis won her second major, two shots ahead of runners-up Na Yeon Choi and Hee Young Park. High winds on Saturday caused a suspension of play at mid-day until Sunday morning; the leaders played 36 holes on Sunday under clear skies and breezy conditions. It was Lewis' first win at the Women's British Open.

The win snapped at ten the longest streak in history without an American winning a women's major title. Lewis was the last American to win, at the Kraft Nabisco Championship in April 2011, 28 months earlier. In between, the ten majors had all been won by Asian-born competitors.

Five years earlier, Lewis was a member of the winning Curtis Cup team in 2008, played at St Andrews. She won all five of her matches at the Old Course in her final amateur competition.

Inbee Park's pursuit of a fourth straight major came up short as she faded in the final two rounds to finish at 294 (+6), fourteen strokes back, in a tie for 42nd place.

== Field ==
The field for the tournament was set at 144, and most earned exemptions based on past performance on the Ladies European Tour, the LPGA Tour, previous major championships, or with a high ranking in the Women's World Golf Rankings. The rest of the field earned entry by successfully competing in qualifying tournaments open to any female golfer, professional or amateur, with a low handicap.

There were 15 exemption categories for the 2013 Women's British Open.

1. The top 15 finishers (and ties) from the 2012 Women's British Open.
2. The top 10 Ladies European Tour members in the Women's World Golf Rankings not already exempt under category 1.
3. The top 30 LPGA Tour members in the Women's World Golf Rankings not already exempt under category 1.
4. The top 25 on the current LET money list not already exempt under category 1 or 2.
5. The top 40 on the current LPGA Tour money list not already exempt under category 1 or 3.
6. The top five on the current LPGA of Japan Tour (JLPGA) money list not already exempt under category 1, 2, 3 or 11.
7. Winners of any recognised LET or LPGA Tour events in the calendar year 2013.
8. Winners of the 2012 LET, LPGA, JLPGA and KLPGA money lists.
9. Winners of the last 10 editions of the Women's British Open.
10. Winners of the last five editions of one of the other three LPGA majors.
11. Winner of the 2012 Japan LPGA Tour Championship Ricoh Cup.
12. The leading five LPGA Tour members upon completion of 36 holes in the 2013 Manulife Financial LPGA Classic who have entered the Championship and who are not otherwise exempt.
13. The leading three LET members in the 2013 ISPS Handa Ladies European Masters, who have entered the Championship and who are not otherwise exempt.
14. The 2013 British Ladies Amateur champion, 2012 Ladies' British Open Amateur Stroke Play champion, 2012 U.S. Women's Amateur champion, 2012 International European Ladies Amateur Championship champion, and the Mark H. McCormack Medal holder provided they are still amateurs at the time of the Championship and a maximum of two other leading amateurs at the discretion of the Ladies' Golf Union.
15. Any players granted special exemptions from qualifying by the Championship Committee.

== Course ==
Hole	Name	Yards	Par	Hole	Name	Yards	Par
1	Burn	376	4	10	Bobby Jones	340	4
2	Dyke	400	4	11	High (In)	160	3
3	Cartgate (Out)	370	4	12	Heathery (In)	314	4
4	Ginger Beer	406	4	13	Hole O'Cross (In)	407	4
5	Hole O'Cross (Out)	561	5	14	Long	520	5
6	Heathery (Out)	369	4	15	Cartgate (In)	414	4
7	High (Out)	353	4	16	Corner of the Dyke	381	4
8	Short	154	3	17	Road	443	4
9	End	347	4	18	Tom Morris	357	4
Out		3,336	36	In		3,336	36
Source:				Total		6,672	72

Previous length of the course for the Women's British Open:

- 2007: 6,638 yards (6,070 m), par 73 (#17 Road was played as a par 5)

== Round summaries ==
=== First round ===
Thursday, 1 August 2013

Place	Player	Score	To par
T1	(Sweden) Camilla Lennarth	66	−6
T1	(United States) Morgan Pressel	66	−6
T3	(United States) Nicole Castrale	67	−5
T3	(South Korea) Na Yeon Choi	67	−5
T3	(South Korea) Eun-Hee Ji	67	−5
T3	(South Korea) Jeon Mi-jeong	67	−5
T3	(United States) Stacy Lewis	67	−5
T3	(United States) Sydnee Michaels	67	−5
T3	(United States) Ryann O'Toole	67	−5
T10	(United States) Dori Carter	68	−4
T10	(United States) Paula Creamer	68	−4
T10	(England) Georgia Hall (a)	68	−4
T10	(United States) Danielle Kang	68	−4
T10	(Sweden) Pernilla Lindberg	68	−4
T10	(Scotland) Catriona Matthew	68	−4
T10	(United States) Lizette Salas	68	−4
T10	(England) Liz Young	68	−4

=== Second round ===
Friday, 2 August 2013

Place	Player	Score	To par
1	(South Korea) Na Yeon Choi	67-67=134	−10
2	(Japan) Miki Saiki	69-66=135	−9
3	(United States) Morgan Pressel	66-70=136	−8
T4	(United States) Nicole Castrale	67-70=137	−7
T4	(South Korea) Jee Young Lee	70-67=137	−7
T4	(Norway) Suzann Pettersen	70-67=137	−7
7	(Sweden) Mikaela Parmlid	69-69=138	−6
T8	(Japan) Mamiko Higa	70-69=139	−5
T8	(United States) Stacy Lewis	67-72=139	−5
T8	(South Korea) Hee Young Park	70-69=139	−5
T8	(South Korea) So Yeon Ryu	69-70=139	−5
T8	(United States) Angela Stanford	69-70=139	−5

=== Third round ===
Saturday, 3 August 2013
Sunday, 4 August 2013

Sunny skies for Saturday, but very high winds caused suspension of play just after noon, with those on the first page of the leaderboard yet to tee off. Play was not restarted, and the third round resumed early Sunday morning.

Place	Player	Score	To par
1	(United States) Morgan Pressel	66-70-71=207	−9
2	(United States) Stacy Lewis	67-72-69=208	−8
T3	(South Korea) Na Yeon Choi	67-67-75=209	−7
T3	(South Korea) Hee Young Park	70-69-70=209	−7
T3	(Norway) Suzann Pettersen	70-67-72=209	−7
T3	(Japan) Miki Saiki	69-66-74=209	−7
T7	(South Korea) Meena Lee	71-69-70=210	−6
T7	(Scotland) Catriona Matthew	68-74-68=210	−6
9	(Japan) Mamiko Higa	70-69-72=211	−5
T10	(United States) Dori Carter	68-72-72=212	−4
T10	(United States) Paula Creamer	68-72-72=212	−4
T10	(South Korea) So Yeon Ryu	69-70-73=212	−4
T10	(United States) Lizette Salas	68-72-72=212	−4

=== Final round ===
Sunday, 4 August 2013

The competitors kept their same pairing from the third round to expedite play, as the leaders had to complete 36 holes on Sunday. Lewis birdied the final two holes and waited for nearly an hour for the final pairing to finish. Her five-iron approach shot at the #17 Road Hole rolled to 3 feet (0.9 m) at the most difficult hole on the Old Course. On the final hole, Lewis used a putter for her approach from 40 yards (37 m) and then sank the birdie putt from 25 feet (8 m).

Place	Player	Score	To par	Money ($)
1	(United States) Stacy Lewis	67-72-69-72=280	−8	402,584
T2	(South Korea) Na Yeon Choi	67-67-75-73=282	−6	198,296
T2	(South Korea) Hee Young Park	70-69-70-73=282	−6	198,296
T4	(Norway) Suzann Pettersen	70-67-72-74=283	−5	116,089
T4	(United States) Morgan Pressel	66-70-71-76=283	−5	116,089
6	(United States) Lizette Salas	68-72-72-73=285	−3	91,094
T7	(Japan) Mamiko Higa	70-69-72-75=286	−2	78,318
T7	(Japan) Miki Saiki	69-66-74-77=286	−2	78,318
T9	(United States) Nicole Castrale	67-70-76-74=287	−1	64,432
T9	(United States) Natalie Gulbis	71-72-74-70=287	−1	64,432

==== Scorecard ====
Final round

Hole	1	2	3	4	5	6	7	8	9	10	11	12	13	14	15	16	17	18
Par	4	4	4	4	5	4	4	3	4	4	3	4	4	5	4	4	4	4
(United States) Lewis	−8	−7	−7	−6	−6	−7	−8	−8	−8	−8	−7	−6	−6	−7	−6	−6	−7	−8
(South Korea) Choi	−7	−7	−8	−7	−8	−8	−8	−8	−8	−9	−9	−9	−8	−7	−7	−7	−6	−6
(South Korea) Park	−8	−8	−8	−7	−7	−7	−7	−7	−8	−8	−8	−7	−6	−5	−5	−6	−6	−6
(Norway) Pettersen	−7	−6	−6	−6	−6	−6	−7	−7	−7	−7	−6	−6	−5	−6	−5	−5	−4	−5
(United States) Pressel	−9	−8	−8	−8	−8	−8	−8	−7	−8	−8	−8	−6	−6	−6	−6	−6	−5	−5

Cumulative tournament scores, relative to par

Birdie	Bogey	Double bogey
