= 1997 U.S. Women's Open =

Coordinates: 45.614°N 123.002°W

Tournament information
- Dates: July 10–13, 1997
- Location: North Plains, Oregon
- Courses: Pumpkin Ridge Golf Club; Witch Hollow Course
- Organized by: USGA
- Tour: LPGA Tour

Statistics
- Par: 71
- Length: 6,365 yards (5,820 m)
- Field: 156 players, 64 after cut
- Cut: 147 (+5)
- Prize fund: $1.3 million
- Winner's share: $232,500

Champion
- (England) Alison Nicholas
- 274 (−10)

Location in the United States
Location in Oregon

The 1997 U.S. Women's Open was the 52nd U.S. Women's Open, held July 10–13 at the Witch Hollow course of Pumpkin Ridge Golf Club near North Plains, Oregon, northwest of Portland.

Alison Nicholas entered the final round with a three stroke lead and shot an even-par 71 to win her only major title, one stroke ahead of runner-up Nancy Lopez. In the final pairing, Lopez slid a 15-foot (4.6 m) downhill birdie putt past the 72nd hole while Nicholas sank a three-footer (0.9 m) for par to win at 274 (−10). Lopez, age 40 and in search of the title that eluded her, was the first-ever player to shoot four rounds in the 60s in the U.S. Women's Open.

Two-time defending champion Annika Sörenstam's attempt for an unprecedented third straight title came up short. Five-over-par after her first nine holes on Thursday, she carded 77-73 for 150 (+8) and missed the 36-hole cut by three strokes, fourteen strokes behind the lead. Through 2021, no one has won three consecutive U.S. Women's Opens.

The final round attendance on Sunday was a record 31,700 and the seven-day total was 123,850.

This was the first U.S. Women's Open at Pumpkin Ridge; the championship returned just six years later in 2003. It previously hosted the U.S. Amateur in 1996, the third straight victory by 20-year-old Tiger Woods in his final competition as an amateur.

== Round summaries ==
=== First round ===
Thursday, July 10, 1997

Place	Player	Score	To par
1	(Sweden) Liselotte Neumann	67	−4
T2	(South Korea) Se Ri Pak	68	−3
T2	(United States) Susie Redman	68	−3
T2	(United States) Deb Richard	68	−3
T2	(United States) Kelly Robbins	68	−3
T6	(England) Trish Johnson	69	−2
T6	(Canada) Lorie Kane	69	−2
T6	(United States) Nancy Lopez	69	−2
T6	(United States) Muffin Spencer-Devlin	69	−2
T10	(United States) Jenny Chuasiriporn (a)	70	−1
T10	(Peru) Alicia Dibos	70	−1
T10	(United States) Rosie Jones	70	−1
T10	(England) Alison Nicholas	70	−1
T10	(United States) Pearl Sinn	70	−1

=== Second round ===
Friday, July 11, 1997

Place	Player	Score	To par
1	(England) Alison Nicholas	70-66=136	−6
T2	(United States) Nancy Lopez	69-68=137	−5
T2	(Sweden) Liselotte Neumann	67-70=137	−5
T2	(United States) Kelly Robbins	68-69=137	−5
T5	(United States) Juli Inkster	72-66=138	−4
T5	(United States) Deb Richard	68-70=138	−4
7	(Canada) Dawn Coe-Jones	72-67=139	−3
T8	(United States) Chris Johnson	72-68=140	−2
T8	(United States) Joan Pitcock	71-69=140	−2
T10	(Italy) Stefania Croce	72-69=141	−1
T10	(England) Lisa Hackney	71-70=141	−1
T10	(United States) Michele Redman	74-67=141	−1
T10	(United States) Muffin Spencer-Devlin	69-72=141	−1

=== Third round ===
Saturday, July 12, 1997

Place	Player	Score	To par
1	(England) Alison Nicholas	70-66-67=203	−10
2	(United States) Nancy Lopez	69-68-69=206	−7
3	(England) Lisa Hackney	71-70-67=208	−5
4	(United States) Kim Williams	71-71-67=209	−4
5	(Australia) Karrie Webb	73-72-65=210	−3
T6	(United States) Donna Andrews	74-71-66=211	−2
T6	(Japan) Akiko Fukushima	71-71-69=211	−2
T6	(United States) Michele Redman	74-67-70=211	−2
T6	(United States) Deb Richard	68-70-73=211	−2
T6	(United States) Kelly Robbins	68-69-74=211	−2

=== Final round ===
Sunday, July 13, 1997

Place	Player	Score	To par	Money ($)
1	(England) Alison Nicholas	70-66-67-71=274	−10	232,500
2	(United States) Nancy Lopez	69-68-69-69=275	−9	137,500
3	(United States) Kelly Robbins	68-69-74-66=277	−7	86,708
4	(Australia) Karrie Webb	73-72-65-68=278	−6	60,432
T5	(England) Lisa Hackney	71-70-67-71=279	−5	46,159
T5	(Italy) Stefania Croce	72-69-71-67=279	−5	46,159
T7	(United States) Michele Redman	74-67-70-69=280	−4	37,542
T7	(United States) Tammie Green	74-70-71-65=280	−4	37,542
T9	(Japan) Akiko Fukushima	71-71-69-71=282	−2	28,769
T9	(United States) Chris Johnson	72-68-73-69=282	−2	28,769
T9	(Canada) Dawn Coe-Jones	72-67-73-70=282	−2	28,769
T9	(United States) Donna Andrews	74-71-66-71=282	−2	28,769
T9	(United States) Patty Sheehan	72-71-71-68=282	−2	28,769
