= Bob Cupp =

American golf course designer (1939-2016)

- Born: Robert Erhard Cupp; December 27, 1939; Lewistown, Pennsylvania, U.S.
- Died: August 19, 2016 (aged 76); Atlanta, Georgia, U.S.
- Education: University of Miami; University of Alaska (MFA); Miami Dade College
- Occupation: Golf course designer
- Spouse: Pamela Amy-Cupp
- Children: 2

Bob Cupp (December 27, 1939 – August 19, 2016) was an American golf course designer. He designed many golf courses worldwide and was the president of the American Society of Golf Course Architects in 2012–13.

== Early life ==
Cupp was born on December 27, 1939, in Lewistown, Pennsylvania. He graduated from the University of Miami with a Bachelor of Arts degree, and he earned a Master of Fine Arts degree from the University of Alaska, followed by an associate degree in golf turf management at Miami Dade College.

== Career ==
Cupp designed many golf courses around the world. Among them are the Shoal Creek Club in Alabama, Desert Highlands Golf Club in Arizona, and the Glen Abbey Golf Course in Ontario, Canada.

Cupp helped design courses for Jack Nicklaus from 1976 to 1982. He also designed the Old Waverly Golf Club in West Point, Mississippi, with Jerry Pate, the Savannah Quarters Country Club in Pooler, Georgia, with Greg Norman, and the Witch Hollow Golf Course at the Pumpkin Ridge Golf Club in North Plains, Oregon, with John Fought. With Tom Kite, Cupp designed the Liberty National Golf Club in Jersey City, New Jersey, and the 36-hole Legends Club in Franklin, Tennessee.

Cupp served as the president of the American Society of Golf Course Architects in 2012–13. He authored a novel about golf in 2007 and co-authored a non-fiction book about golf with Ron Whitten in 2012.

== Personal life and death ==
Cupp married Pamela Amy-Cupp. They had two children, and they resided in the Buckhead neighborhood of Atlanta.

Cupp died on August 19, 2016, in Atlanta.

== Works ==
- Cupp, Bob (2007). The Edict: A Novel from the Beginnings of Golf. New York: Vintage Books. ISBN 9780307385925. OCLC 181599861.
- Cupp, Bob; Whitten, Rob (2012). Golf's Grand Design: The Evolution of Golf Architecture in America. ISBN 9781478176381. OCLC 894127123.

== Golf courses (original design) ==
- Angel Park (Short Course), Las Vegas, Nevada
- Beacon Hall, Aurora, Ontario, Canada
- Big Sky Golf and Country Club, Pemberton, British Columbia
- Bradford Creek Golf Club, Greeneville, North Carolina
- Costa del Sol, Miami, Florida
- Cheeca Lodge, Islamorada, Florida
- Council Fire Country Club, Chattanooga, Tennessee
- Crosswater Golf Course, Sunriver, Oregon
- Cumming’s Cove Club, Hendersonville, North Carolina
- Deerhurst Inn and Country Club, Ontario, Canada
- Eagle Ridge Golf Club, Raleigh, North Carolina
- East Sussex National (East), London, England
- East Sussex National (West), London, England
- Emerald Bay Plantation, Destin, Florida
- Estancia de Cafayate, Salta Province, Argentina
- Estuary at Grey Oaks, Naples, Florida
- Four Bridges, Cincinnati, Ohio
- Frenchman’s Creek (South), West Palm Beach, Florida
- Frenchman’s Creek (North), West Palm Beach, Florida
- Grasslands at Oakbridge, Lakeland, Florida
- Greystone Country Club, Birmingham, Alabama
- Grizzly Ranch, Portola, California
- Hawk’s Ridge, Ball Ground, Georgia
- Homestead Air Force Base, Homestead, Florida
- Indianwood (New), Lake Orion, Michigan
- Jennings Mill Country Club, Athens, Georgia
- John Kyle State Park, Saris, Mississippi
- Kelly Plantation, Destin, Florida
- Kiokawa Golf Club, Kiyokawa, Japan
- La Playa Resort, Naples, Florida
- Laurel Ridge Country Club, Waynesville, North Carolina
- Legends Club of Tennessee North Course, Franklin, TN
- Legends Club of Tennessee South Course, Franklin, TN
- Langdon Farms, Clackamas County, Oregon
- Liberty National Golf Club, Jersey City, New Jersey
- Little Course at Aspen Grove, Franklin, Tennessee
- Mad River Golf Club, Nottawasaga, Ontario, Canada
- Marietta Country Club, Kennesaw, Georgia
- Mountain Spa Resort, Las Vegas, Nevada
- Newcastle (Coal Creek), Newcastle, Washington
- Newcastle (China Creek), Newcastle, Washington
- Old Waverly Golf Club, West Point, Mississippi
- Pumpkin Ridge (Ghost Creek), Cornelius, Oregon
- Pumpkin Ridge (Witch Hollow), Cornelius, Oregon
- Port Armor Golf Club, Greensboro, Georgia
- Pelham Municipal, Pelham, Alabama
- Palmetto Hall Plantation, Hilton Head Island, South Carolina
- Rarity Pointe, Knoxville, Tennessee
- Reunion Golf Club, Jackson, Mississippi
- Reynold’s Plantation, Greensboro, Georgia
- Royal Kenfield, Henderson, Nevada
- Rush Creek Golf Club, Minneapolis, Minnesota
- Savannah Harbor, Savannah, Georgia
- Settindown Creek, Roswell, Georgia
- Shadow Wood (North), Bonita Springs, Florida
- Shadow Wood (South), Bonita Springs, Florida
- Sonnenalp (Singletree), Edwards, Colorado
- Spanish Hills, Camarillo, California
- Stowe Mountain Resort, Stowe, Vermont
- Tatum Ranch, Phoenix, Arizona
- Tierra Rejada Golf Club, Moorpark, California
- The Reserve North Course, Hillsboro, Oregon
- Thousand Hills Golf Club, Branson, Missouri
- TPC at Starr Pass, Tucson, Arizona
- Walden Lake Country Club, Plant City, Florida
- Water’s Edge Par Three, San Francisco, California
- Woodside Plantation, Aiken, South Carolina

== Golf courses – rebuild ==
- Alamance Country Club, Burlington, North Carolina
- Augusta Country Club, Augusta, Georgia
- Baltimore Country Club West, Baltimore, Maryland
- Bobby Jones Golf Course, Atlanta, Georgia
- Capital City Club Brookhaven, Atlanta, Georgia
- Druid Hills Golf Club, Atlanta, Georgia
- Frenchman’s Creek South, West Palm Beach, Florida
- Forest Height’s Country Club, Statesboro, Georgia
- Fiddlesticks Country Club, Ft. Myers, Florida
- Feathersound Country Club, Clearwater, Florida
- Grand Geneva Resort and Spa, Lake Geneva, Wisconsin
- Highland Park Country Club, Birmingham, Alabama
- Hawk’s Landing Golf Club, Orlando, Florida
- John A White Park, Atlanta, Georgia
- Moon Valley Country Club, Phoenix, Arizona
- North River Yacht & Country Club, Tuscaloosa, Alabama
- Oak Ridge Golf Club, Oak Ridge, Tennessee
- Pecan Valley Golf Club, San Antonio, Texas
- Swan Point, Charles County, Maryland
- The Greenbrier (Meadows), White Sulphur Springs, WV
- The Rookery, Marco Island, Florida
- University or Oklahoma Golf Club, Norman, Oklahoma
- Vinny Links at Shelby Park, Franklin, TN
- Woodfield Country Club, Boca Raton, Florida

== Golf courses – renovation ==
- Atlanta Country Club, Marietta, Georgia
- Augusta National Golf Club, Augusta Georgia
- Bluegrass Yacht & Country Club, Bluegrass, Tennessee
- Brook-Lea Country Club, Rochester, New York
- Bryn Mawr Country Club, Chicago, Illinois
- Cartersville Country Club, Cartersville, Georgia
- Clarksville Country Club, Clarksville, Tennessee
- Colonial Country Club, Ft. Worth, Texas
- Columbia Edgewater Country Club, Greenville, South Carolina
- Evanston Golf Club, Skokie, Illinois
- Emerald Bay Plantation, Destin, Florida
- Gaston Country Club, Gastonia, North Carolina
- Gatlinburg Country Club, Gatlinburg, Tennessee
- Glen Arven Country Club, Thomasville, Georgia
- Hillendale Country Club, Baltimore, Maryland
- Indianwood Old Course, Lake Orion, Michigan
- Indian Hills Country Club, Bowling Green, Kentucky
- Indian Hills Country Club, Marietta, Georgia
- Lago Mar Country Club, Plantation, Florida
- Marrietta Country Club, Kennesaw, Georgia
- Nassau Country Club, Glen Cove, New York
- Olde Town Club, Winston-Salem, North Carolina
- Palm River Golf Club, Naples, Florida
- Peachtree Golf Club, Atlanta, Georgia
- Preston Trail Golf Club, Dallas, Texas
- Rosedale Country Club, Toronto, Canada
- Santa Barbara Golf Club, Santa Barbara, CA
- Summit Golf and Country Club, Richmond Hill, Ontario, Canada
- Tualatin Country Club, Tualatin, Oregon
- The Country Club, Farmington, Connecticut
- The Golf Club of Avon, Avon, Connecticut
- The Palm Course at Grey Oaks, Naples, Florida
- Wanakah Country Club, Hamburg, New York
- Woodmont Country Club, Rockdale, Maryland
- Weston Golf Club, Weston, Massachusetts

== Golf courses – restoration ==
- Leatherstocking Country Club, Cooperstown, New York
- Oakhurst Links, White Sulphur Springs, West Virginia
- Seaview Resort(Bay), Absecon, New Jersey
- Seaview Resort(Pines), Absecon, New Jersey

== Golf courses (closed/no longer exist – NLE) ==
- Hidden Valley (defunct), Miami, Florida
- Ironwood Golf Club (defunct), Naples, Florida
- The Woodyard (defunct), Savannah, Georgia
