= 2003 U.S. Women's Open =

Coordinates: 45.614°N 123.002°W

Tournament information
- Dates: July 3–7, 2003
- Location: North Plains, Oregon
- Courses: Pumpkin Ridge Golf Club; Witch Hollow Course
- Organized by: USGA
- Tour: LPGA Tour

Statistics
- Par: 71
- Length: 6,550 yards (5,989 m)
- Field: 156 players, 60 after cut
- Cut: 149 (+7)
- Prize fund: $3.1 million
- Winner's share: $560,000

Champion
- (United States) Hilary Lunke
- 283 (−1), playoff

Location in the United States
Location in Oregon

The 2003 U.S. Women's Open was the 58th U.S. Women's Open, held July 3–7 at the Witch Hollow course of Pumpkin Ridge Golf Club near North Plains, Oregon, northwest of Portland.

Hilary Lunke won her only major (and only LPGA) title in an 18-hole Monday playoff over Angela Stanford and Kelly Robbins, and became the first qualifier to win the championship. The three Americans finished the fourth round at 283 (−1), one stroke ahead of two-time champion Annika Sörenstam, who bogeyed the par-5 72nd hole after putting her tee shot in the fairway. The last playoff was five years earlier in 1998 and it had been sixteen years since three players were involved. In the playoff round, all three players birdied the final (90th) hole, and Lunke clinched the title by one stroke over Stanford.

This was the second U.S. Women's Open at the Witch Hollow course; it hosted six years earlier in 1997, won by Alison Nicholas. It was also the site of the U.S. Amateur in 1996, the third straight victory by 20-year-old Tiger Woods in his final competition as an amateur.

== Course layout ==
Witch Hollow Course

| Hole | 1 | 2 | 3 | 4 | 5 | 6 | 7 | 8 | 9 | Out | 10 | 11 | 12 | 13 | 14 | 15 | 16 | 17 | 18 | In | Total |
|---|---|---|---|---|---|---|---|---|---|---|---|---|---|---|---|---|---|---|---|---|---|
| Yardage | 383 | 169 | 386 | 531 | 163 | 411 | 559 | 379 | 427 | 3,408 | 197 | 534 | 127 | 387 | 394 | 175 | 407 | 419 | 502 | 3,142 | 6,550 |
| Par | 4 | 3 | 4 | 5 | 3 | 4 | 5 | 4 | 4 | 36 | 3 | 5 | 3 | 4 | 4 | 3 | 4 | 4 | 5 | 35 | 71 |

== Round summaries ==
=== First round ===
Thursday, July 3, 2003

| Place | Player | Score | To par |
|---|---|---|---|
| 1 | (Scotland) Mhairi McKay | 66 | −5 |
| T2 | (United States) Donna Andrews | 69 | −2 |
| T2 | (United States) Juli Inkster | 69 | −2 |
| T4 | (United States) Rosie Jones | 70 | −1 |
| T4 | (United States) Morgan Pressel (a) | 70 | −1 |
| T4 | (Italy) Giulia Sergas | 70 | −1 |
| T4 | (South Korea) Aree Song (a) | 70 | −1 |
| T4 | (United States) Angela Stanford | 70 | −1 |
| T9 | (United States) Ashli Bunch | 71 | E |
| T9 | (United States) Michele Redman | 71 | E |
| T9 | (United States) Irene Cho (a) | 71 | E |
| T9 | (Australia) Rachel Teske | 71 | E |
| T9 | (Mexico) Lorena Ochoa | 71 | E |
| T9 | (United States) Kirsty Taylor | 71 | E |
| T9 | (United States) Jamie Hullett | 71 | E |
| T9 | (United States) Stephanie Louden | 71 | E |
| T9 | (United States) Laura Diaz | 71 | E |
| T9 | (England) Karen Stupples | 71 | E |
| T9 | (United States) Hilary Lunke | 71 | E |
| T9 | (Spain) Paula Martí | 71 | E |
| T9 | (United States) Annette DeLuca | 71 | E |

=== Second round ===
Friday, July 4, 2003

| Place | Player | Score | To par |
|---|---|---|---|
| 1 | (Scotland) Mhairi McKay | 66-70=136 | −6 |
| T2 | (United States) Juli Inkster | 69-71=140 | −2 |
| T2 | (United States) Hilary Lunke | 71-69=140 | −2 |
| T2 | (United States) Angela Stanford | 70-70=140 | −2 |
| 5 | (United States) Donna Andrews | 69-72=141 | −1 |
| T6 | (United States) Beth Daniel | 73-69=142 | E |
| T6 | (United States) Laura Diaz | 71-71=142 | E |
| T6 | (United States) Natalie Gulbis | 73-69=142 | E |
| T6 | (South Korea) Jeong Jang | 73-69=142 | E |
| T6 | (United States) Rosie Jones | 73-69=142 | E |
| T6 | (United States) Leta Lindley | 73-69=142 | E |
| T6 | (France) Patricia Meunier-Lebouc | 73-69=142 | E |
| T6 | (England) Alison Nicholas | 75-67=142 | E |
| T6 | (United States) Dottie Pepper | 72-70=142 | E |

=== Third round ===
Saturday, July 5, 2003

| Place | Player | Score | To par |
|---|---|---|---|
| 1 | (United States) Hilary Lunke | 71-69-68=208 | −5 |
| 2 | (United States) Angela Stanford | 70-70-69=209 | −4 |
| T3 | (South Korea) Jeong Jang | 73-69-69=211 | −2 |
| T3 | (Scotland) Mhairi McKay | 66-70-75=211 | −2 |
| T3 | (South Korea) Aree Song (a) | 70-73-68=211 | −2 |
| T3 | (Sweden) Annika Sörenstam | 72-72-67=211 | −2 |
| 7 | (United States) Donna Andrews | 69-72-72=213 | E |
| T8 | (United States) Natalie Gulbis | 73-69-72=214 | +1 |
| T8 | (United States) Juli Inkster | 69-71-74=214 | +1 |
| T8 | (Norway) Suzann Pettersen | 76-69-69=214 | +1 |
| T8 | (United States) Kelly Robbins | 74-69-71=214 | +1 |

=== Final round ===
Sunday, July 6, 2003

| Place | Player | Score | To par | Money ($) |
|---|---|---|---|---|
| T1 | (United States) Hilary Lunke | 71-69-68-75=283 | −1 | Playoff |
| T1 | (United States) Angela Stanford | 70-70-69-74=283 | −1 | Playoff |
| T1 | (United States) Kelly Robbins | 74-69-71-69=283 | −1 | Playoff |
| 4 | (Sweden) Annika Sörenstam | 72-72-67-73=284 | E | 150,994 |
| 5 | (South Korea) Aree Song (a) | 70-73-68-74=285 | +1 | 0 |
| T6 | (South Korea) Jeong Jang | 73-69-69-75=286 | +2 | 115,333 |
| T6 | (Scotland) Mhairi McKay | 66-70-75-75=286 | +2 | 115,333 |
| 8 | (United States) Juli Inkster | 69-71-74-73=287 | +3 | 97,363 |
| 9 | (United States) Rosie Jones | 70-72-73-73=288 | +4 | 90,241 |
| T10 | (South Korea) Grace Park | 72-76-73-68=289 | +5 | 79,243 |
| T10 | (Norway) Suzann Pettersen | 76-69-69-75=289 | +5 | 79,243 |

==== Scorecard ====
| Hole | 1 | 2 | 3 | 4 | 5 | 6 | 7 | 8 | 9 | 10 | 11 | 12 | 13 | 14 | 15 | 16 | 17 | 18 |
|---|---|---|---|---|---|---|---|---|---|---|---|---|---|---|---|---|---|---|
| Par | 4 | 3 | 4 | 5 | 3 | 4 | 5 | 4 | 4 | 3 | 5 | 3 | 4 | 4 | 3 | 4 | 4 | 5 |
| (United States) Lunke | −6 | −6 | −5 | −5 | −4 | −3 | −2 | −2 | −2 | −2 | −3 | −3 | −2 | −1 | −1 | −1 | −1 | −1 |
| (United States) Stanford | −4 | −4 | −4 | −5 | −4 | −3 | −3 | −2 | −2 | −2 | −1 | −1 | −1 | E | E | E | E | −1 |
| (United States) Robbins | +1 | +1 | +1 | +1 | +1 | +2 | +2 | +3 | +2 | +2 | +1 | +1 | +1 | +1 | +1 | E | E | −1 |
| (Sweden) Sörenstam | −2 | −2 | −2 | −2 | −1 | −1 | E | E | E | E | E | E | E | E | −1 | −1 | −1 | E |
| (South Korea) Song | −2 | −1 | −1 | −1 | −1 | +1 | +2 | +2 | +3 | +3 | +2 | +2 | +3 | +2 | +2 | +2 | +2 | +1 |
| (South Korea) Jang | −3 | −3 | −4 | −4 | +1 | +1 | E | E | E | E | E | +1 | +2 | +2 | +2 | +2 | +2 | +2 |
| (Scotland) McKay | −2 | −2 | −1 | −1 | E | +1 | +1 | +2 | +2 | +2 | +2 | +2 | +2 | +3 | +3 | +2 | +2 | +2 |
| (United States) Inkster | +1 | +1 | +1 | E | +2 | +3 | +3 | +3 | +3 | +3 | +2 | +2 | +3 | +3 | +3 | +3 | +2 | +3 |
| (United States) Jones | +2 | +3 | +2 | +1 | +2 | +1 | +1 | +2 | +2 | +1 | +1 | +3 | +4 | +3 | +3 | +3 | +3 | +4 |
| (South Korea) Park | +8 | +8 | +7 | +7 | +9 | +8 | +8 | +7 | +7 | +6 | +6 | +6 | +6 | +7 | +7 | +6 | +6 | +5 |
| (Norway) Pettersen | E | E | E | E | +2 | +2 | +3 | +3 | +3 | +3 | +4 | +4 | +5 | +5 | +5 | +5 | +5 | +5 |

| Birdie | Bogey | Double bogey | Triple bogey+ |

=== Playoff ===
Monday, July 7, 2003

| Place | Player | Score | To par | Money ($) |
|---|---|---|---|---|
| 1 | (United States) Hilary Lunke | 35-35=70 | −1 | 560,000 |
| T2 | (United States) Angela Stanford | 39-32=71 | E | 275,839 |
| T2 | (United States) Kelly Robbins | 37-36=73 | +2 | 275,839 |

==== Scorecard ====
| Hole | 1 | 2 | 3 | 4 | 5 | 6 | 7 | 8 | 9 | 10 | 11 | 12 | 13 | 14 | 15 | 16 | 17 | 18 |
|---|---|---|---|---|---|---|---|---|---|---|---|---|---|---|---|---|---|---|
| Par | 4 | 3 | 4 | 5 | 3 | 4 | 5 | 4 | 4 | 3 | 5 | 3 | 4 | 4 | 3 | 4 | 4 | 5 |
| (United States) Lunke | E | E | E | −1 | −1 | −2 | −1 | −1 | −1 | −1 | −1 | E | E | E | E | E | E | −1 |
| (United States) Stanford | +1 | +2 | +2 | +2 | +2 | +2 | +2 | +3 | +3 | +3 | +2 | +1 | +1 | E | E | E | +1 | E |
| (United States) Robbins | +1 | +1 | +2 | +3 | +3 | +2 | +1 | +1 | +1 | E | +1 | +1 | +3 | +3 | +3 | +3 | +3 | +2 |
