= Volunteers of America Classic =

Golf tournament

Coordinates: 33.102°N 96.925°W

Tournament information
- Location: The Colony, Texas, U.S.
- Established: 2013
- Course: Old American Golf Club
- Par: 71
- Length: 6,475 yards (5,921 m)
- Tour: LPGA Tour
- Format: Stroke play - 72 holes
- Prize fund: $1.8 million
- Final year: 2023

Tournament record score
- Aggregate: 266 Cheyenne Knight (2019); 266 Charley Hull (2022)
- To par: −18 as above

Final champion
- (South Korea) Kim Hyo-joo

Location in the United States
Location in Texas

The Volunteers of America Classic was a women's professional golf tournament in Texas on the LPGA Tour. It debuted in April 2013 at Las Colinas Country Club in Irving, northwest of downtown Dallas.

Volunteers of America, the title sponsor, is a faith-based nonprofit organization that provides affordable housing and other assistance, primarily to low-income people, throughout the United States.

Inbee Park won the inaugural event, one stroke ahead of Carlota Ciganda, and became its first multiple winner in 2015. In between, Stacy Lewis won by six strokes in 2014 and set the tournament record at 268 (−16).

In 2018, the tournament moved north to the Old American Golf Club in The Colony, along Lewisville Lake.

== Tournament names ==
- 2013–2014: North Texas LPGA Shootout
- 2015: Volunteers of America North Texas Shootout Presented by JTBC
- 2016–2017: Volunteers of America Texas Shootout Presented by JTBC
- 2018: Volunteers of America LPGA Texas Classic
- 2019–2021: Volunteers of America Classic
- 2022–2023: The Ascendant LPGA benefitting Volunteers of America

== Winners ==
Year	Date	Champion	Country	Winning score	To par	Margin of victory	Purse ($)	Winner's share ($)
2023	Oct 8	Kim Hyo-joo	South Korea	64-68-70-69=271	−13	4 strokes	1,800,000	270,000
2022	Oct 2	Charley Hull	England	67-64-71-64=266	−18	1 stroke	1,700,000	255,000
2021	Jul 4	Ko Jin-young	South Korea	63-70-66-69=268	−16	1 stroke	1,500,000	225,000
2020	Dec 6	Angela Stanford	United States	71-69-70-67=277	−7	2 strokes	1,750,000	262,500
2019	Oct 6	Cheyenne Knight	United States	66-67-67-66=266	−18	2 strokes	1,300,000	195,000
2018	May 6	Park Sung-hyun	South Korea	65-66=131	−11	1 stroke	1,300,000	195,000
2017	Apr 30	Haru Nomura	Japan	68-65-72-76=281	−3	Playoff	1,300,000	195,000
2016	May 1	Jenny Shin	South Korea	68-70-65-67=270	−14	2 strokes	1,300,000	195,000
2015	May 3	Inbee Park (2)	South Korea	69-66-69-65=269	−15	3 strokes	1,300,000	195,000
2014	May 4	Stacy Lewis	United States	71-64-69-64=268	−16	6 strokes	1,300,000	195,000
2013	Apr 28	Inbee Park	South Korea	67-70-67-67=271	−13	1 stroke	1,300,000	195,000

== Tournament records ==
Year	Player	Score	Round
2017	Dori Carter	63 (−8)	2nd
2019	Stephanie Meadow	63 (−8)	1st
2021	Ko Jin-young	63 (−8)	1st
2022	Cheyenne Knight	63 (−8)	4th
2022	Lilia Vu	63 (−8)	4th
2023	Cheyenne Knight	63 (–8)	4th
