= Grey Silo Golf Course =

Public golf course located in Waterloo, Ontario

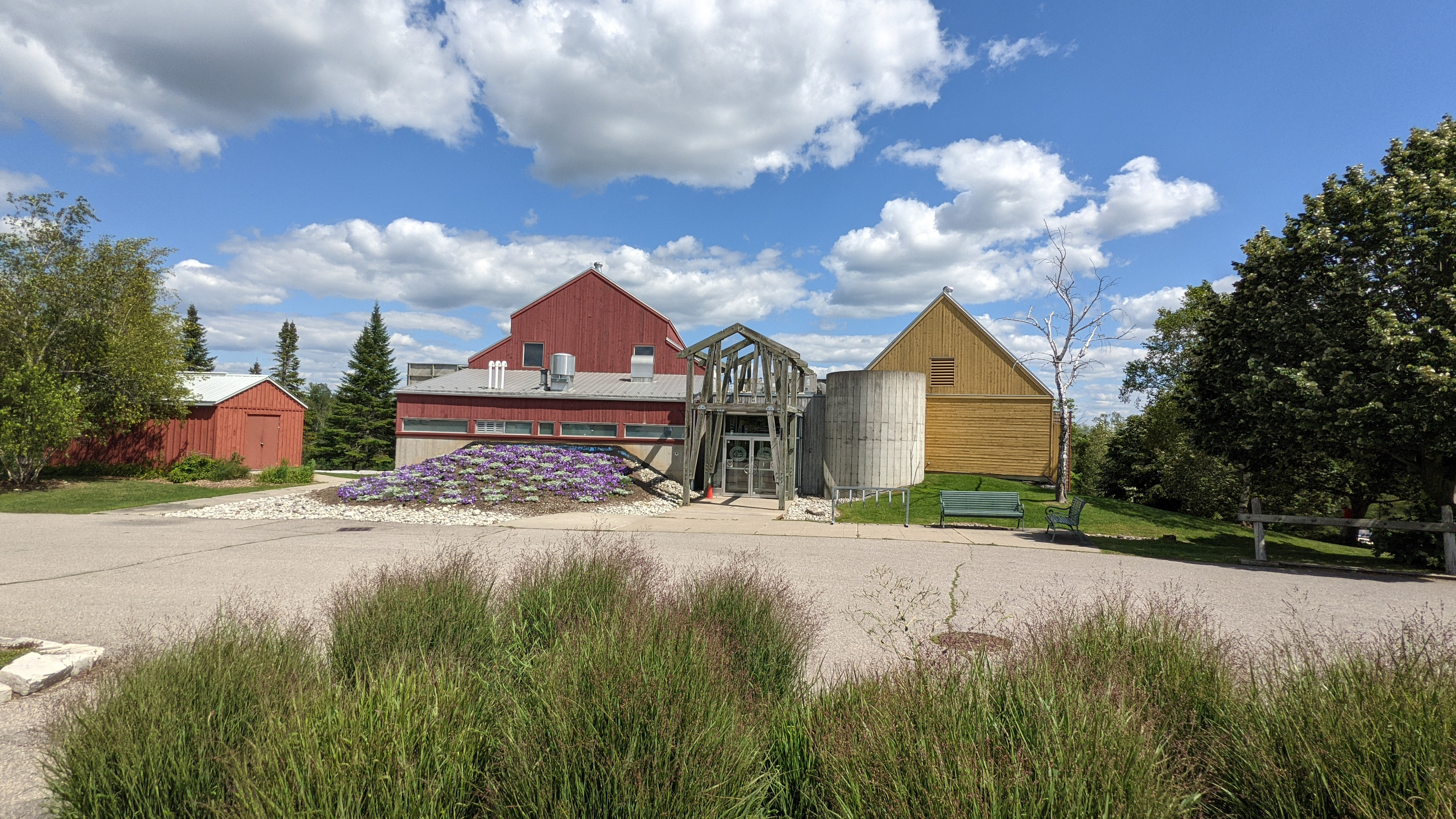
- Club House
- Interactive map of Grey Silo Golf Course
- 43.517°N 80.492°W

Club information
- Location: Waterloo, Ontario, Canada
- Established: 2000
- Type: Public
- Owner: City of Waterloo
- Operator: Golf North Properties
- Tota holes: 18
- Tournaments: Manulife Financial LPGA Classic
- Website: www.golfgreysilo.ca
- Designed by: Steve Young
- Par: 71
- Length: 6,532 yards (5,973 m)
- Course rating: 71.2
- Slope rating: 131

Grey Silo Golf Course is an 18-hole public golf course located in Waterloo, Ontario, Canada. Opened in 2000 and owned by the city of Waterloo, the course is within RIM Park along the Grand River. Designed by Steve Young, it was the host course of the Manulife Financial LPGA Classic, a 72-hole event on the LPGA Tour, from 2012 to 2014.

== Scorecard ==
Grey Silo Golf Course
| Tee | Rating/Slope | 1 | 2 | 3 | 4 | 5 | 6 | 7 | 8 | 9 | Out | 10 | 11 | 12 | 13 | 14 | 15 | 16 | 17 | 18 | In | Total |
| Black | 71.2 / 131 | 414 | 166 | 432 | 563 | 519 | 436 | 324 | 176 | 339 | 3369 | 351 | 156 | 410 | 425 | 377 | 408 | 179 | 468 | 389 | 3163 | 6532 |
| Gold | 69.4 / 128 | 379 | 160 | 398 | 496 | 487 | 412 | 291 | 168 | 317 | 3108 | 331 | 141 | 388 | 398 | 357 | 378 | 159 | 442 | 379 | 2973 | 6081 |
| Silver | 67.2 / 126 | 350 | 137 | 366 | 490 | 463 | 385 | 265 | 145 | 312 | 2913 | 311 | 124 | 361 | 366 | 329 | 350 | 139 | 419 | 341 | 2740 | 5653 |
| Bronze | 70.2 / 124 | 320 | 113 | 338 | 440 | 439 | 365 | 233 | 121 | 286 | 2655 | 299 | 101 | 336 | 340 | 305 | 323 | 122 | 391 | 325 | 2542 | 5197 |
| Par | | 4 | 3 | 4 | 5 | 5 | 4 | 4 | 3 | 4 | 36 | 4 | 3 | 4 | 4 | 4 | 4 | 3 | 5 | 4 | 35 | 71 |
| SI | | 3 | 17 | 9 | 1 | 11 | 5 | 15 | 7 | 13 | | 10 | 18 | 6 | 2 | 16 | 14 | 8 | 12 | 4 |
