= Old American Golf Club =

Golf club in the United States

- Location within the United States Location within Texas
- 33.102°N 96.925°W

Club information
- Location: The Colony, Texas, U.S.
- Elevation: 530 feet (160 m)
- Established: 2010; 16 years ago
- Type: Semi-private
- Tota holes: 18
- Tournaments: Volunteers of America LPGA Texas Classic (2018)
- Website: theoldamericangolfclub.com
- Designed by: Tripp Davis, Justin Leonard
- Par: 71
- Length: 7,084 yards (6,478 m)
- Course rating: 75.2
- Slope rating: 145

Old American Golf Club is an 18-hole semi-private golf club in the southern United States, located in The Colony, Texas, a suburb north of Dallas. Along Lewisville Lake in Denton County, the course opened for play in 2010, designed by Tripp Davis and tour professional Justin Leonard.

== Tour events ==
Old American is scheduled to host its first LPGA Tour event, the Volunteers of America LPGA Texas Classic, in May 2018. The tournament was previously held in Irving at Las Colinas Country Club.

== Course ==
Back (Leonard) tees

Hole	Yards	Par	Hole	Yards	Par
1	441	4	10	442	4
2	482	4	11	484	4
3	556	5	12	229	3
4	175	3	13	409	4
5	469	4	14	571	5
6	202	3	15	489	4
7	500	5	16	346	4
8	216	3	17	154	3
9	368	4	18	551	5
Out	3,409	35	In	3,675	36
Source:			Total	7,084	71
