= Sentosa Golf Club =

Golf course in Singapore

Coordinates: 1°14′38″N 103°49′46″E

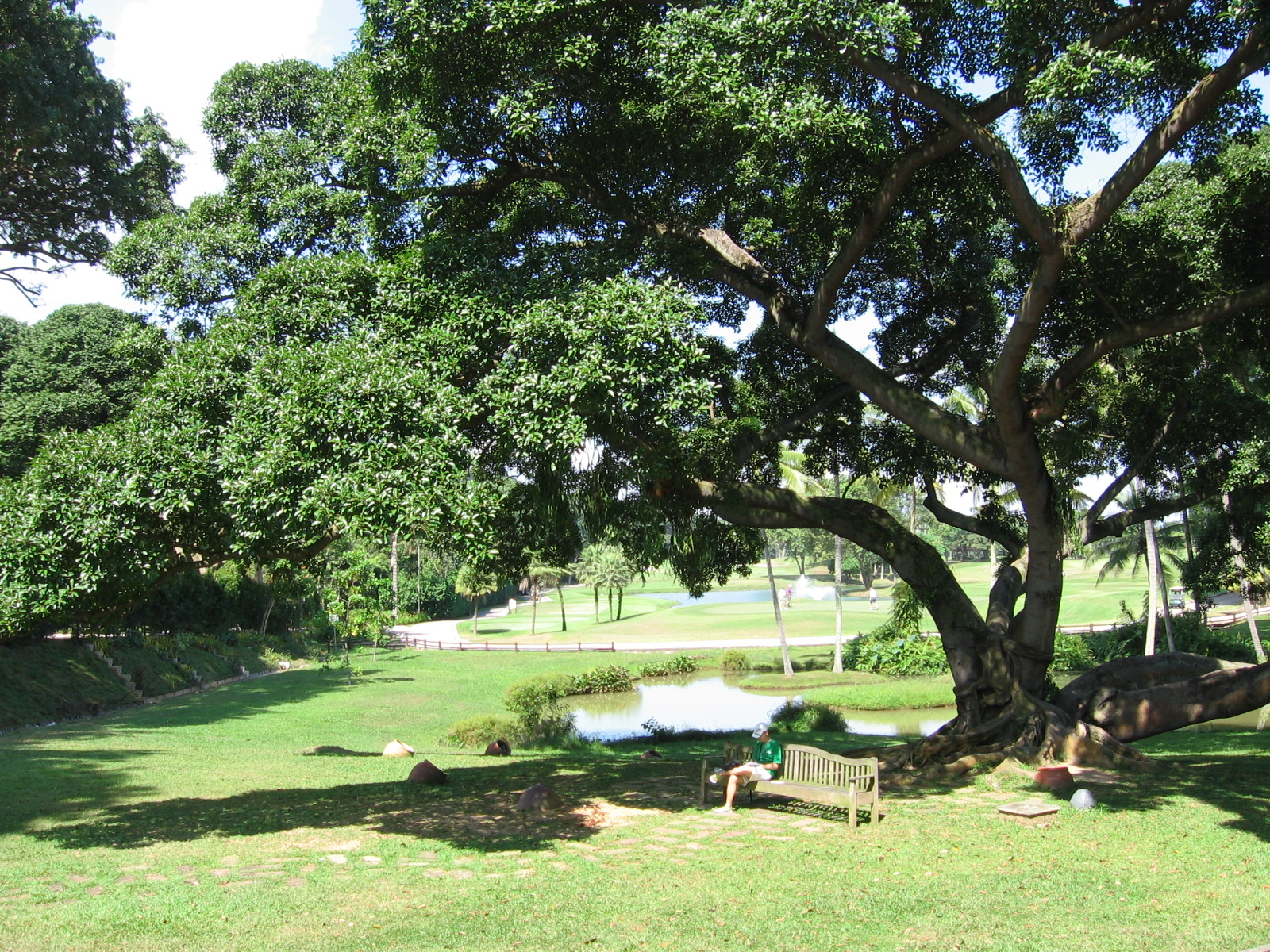
- Tanjong course, pictured 2006
- Interactive map of Sentosa Golf Club

Club information
- Established: 1974
- Type: Private
- Owner: Sentosa Development Corporation
- Operator: Sentosa Development Corporation
- Tota holes: 36
- Tournaments: HSBC Women's Champions
- Website: https://sentosagolf.com

Sentosa Golf Club is a golf course on Sentosa Island, Singapore. The club hosts the LIV Golf Singapore and the HSBC Women's Champions event on the LPGA tour.

== History ==
The Sentosa Golf Club was opened in 1974 by Singaporean Prime Minister Lee Kuan Yew. Today, the club has two courses, the Serapong Course and the Tanjong Course. The Serapong Course has been named the best course in Singapore at the World's Best Golf Course awards. The Serapong course opened in 1982 and was designed by Ron Fream. In March 2020, the Serapong course underwent renovations. Maintenance work was completed in December 2020. The Serapong course has a Par 72 and extends 6794 metres. The New Tanjong course is also a Par 72 and has a length of 6479 metres. The Women's Champions event is held on the Tanjong Course.

In 2024, the club celebrated its 50th anniversary.

Sentosa is known for their commitment to environmental initiatives. In 2023, the course claimed to have become the world's first carbon neutral golf course. In 2024, the club acquired an all-electric, no emissions cart range to further reduce their carbon footprint. That year, Sentosa was named Asia's Best Golf Course’, ‘Asia’s Best Eco-Friendly Golf Facility’ and ‘Singapore’s Best Golf Course’ at the 2024 World Golf Awards.

=== Controversies ===
In November 2024, the club became involved in a money laundering investigation by the Singapore Police Force. Five members of the club were arrested and $1B in assets were seized.
