= Hilary Lunke =

American professional golfer (born 1979)

Personal information
- Full name: Hilary Laura Lunke
- Nationality: United States
- Born: June 7, 1979 (age 47) Edina, Minnesota, U.S.
- Height: 5 ft 7 in (1.70 m)
- Spouse: Tylar Lunke
- Children: 3

Career
- Sport: Golf
- College: Stanford University
- Turned professional: 2002
- Former tour: LPGA Tour (2002–2008)
- Professional wins: 1

Number of wins by tour
- LPGA Tour: 1

Best results in LPGA major championships (wins: 1)
- Chevron Championship: T68: 2005
- Women's PGA C'ship: T37: 2003
- U.S. Women's Open: Won: 2003
- du Maurier Classic: DNP
- Women's British Open: CUT: 2002–2006

Achievements and awards
- William and Mousie Powell Award: 2008

Hilary Laura Lunke (née: Homeyer; born June 7, 1979) is an American former professional golfer. She is best known for winning the 2003 U.S. Women's Open.

== Career ==
In 1979, Homeyer was born in Edina, Minnesota. She attended Stanford University and became a member of the LPGA Tour in 2002. On July 7, 2003, Lunke defeated Kelly Robbins and Angela Stanford in an 18-hole playoff to win the U.S. Women's Open for her first and only LPGA win. Lunke was also the first player to win the U.S. Open after advancing through local and sectional qualifying. Lunke's husband, Tylar, was her caddie on that July day.

Lunke joined the LPGA Player Executive Committee in 2006 and was selected vice president in 2007 and president in 2008. She retired at the end of the 2008 season.

== Personal life ==
She married her husband, Tyler, on November 2, 2002. Lunke gave birth to her first child, Greta, in November 2007. She had her second child, daughter Marin, in October 2009. Then she had her third child in 2012, Linnea.

== Awards and honors ==
In 2008, she was bestowed with the William and Mousie Powell Award, given to an LPGA member "who, in the opinion of her playing peers, by her behavior and deeds, best exemplifies the spirits, ideals and values of the LPGA."

== Professional wins ==
=== LPGA Tour wins (1) ===
Legend
LPGA Tour major championships (1)
Other LPGA Tour (0)

No.	Date	Tournament	Winning score	Margin of victory	Runners-up
1	Jul 6, 2003	U.S. Women's Open	−1 (71-69-68-75=283)	Playoff	(United States) Kelly Robbins (United States) Angela Stanford

LPGA Tour playoff record (1–0)

No.	Year	Tournament	Opponents	Result
1	2003	U.S. Women's Open	(United States) Kelly Robbins (United States) Angela Stanford	Won 18-hole playoff (Lunke:70, Stanford:71, Robbins:73)

== Major championships ==
=== Wins (1) ===
Year	Championship	Winning score	Margin	Runners-up
2003	U.S. Women's Open	−1 (71-69-68-75=283)	Playoff^{1}	(United States) Kelly Robbins, (United States) Angela Stanford

^{1}Defeated Stanford and Robbins in an 18-hole playoff: Lunke 70, Stanford 71, and Robbins 73.

=== Results timeline ===
Tournament	1997	1998	1999	2000
Kraft Nabisco Championship				
LPGA Championship				
U.S. Women's Open	CUT			56
du Maurier Classic ^				

Tournament	2001	2002	2003	2004	2005	2006	2007	2008
Kraft Nabisco Championship				69	T68	CUT	CUT	CUT
LPGA Championship			T37	CUT	T42	CUT	CUT	
U.S. Women's Open	WD		1	T64	CUT	CUT	CUT	CUT
Women's British Open		CUT	CUT	CUT	CUT	CUT		

^ The Women's British Open replaced the du Maurier Classic as an LPGA major in 2001.

Win
Top 10
Did not play

CUT = missed the half-way cut
WD = withdrew
"T" = tied for place

=== Summary ===
Tournament	Wins	2nd	3rd	Top-5	Top-10	Top-25	Events	Cuts made
Kraft Nabisco Championship	0	0	0	0	0	0	5	2
LPGA Championship	0	0	0	0	0	0	5	2
U.S. Women's Open	1	0	0	1	1	1	9	3
Women's British Open	0	0	0	0	0	0	5	0
Totals	1	0	0	1	1	1	24	7

- Most consecutive cuts made – 2 (twice)
- Longest streak of top-10s – 1 (once)

== U.S. national team appearances ==
Amateur

- Espirito Santo Trophy: 2000
- Curtis Cup: 2000 (winners)
