= Angela Stanford =

American professional golfer (born 1977)

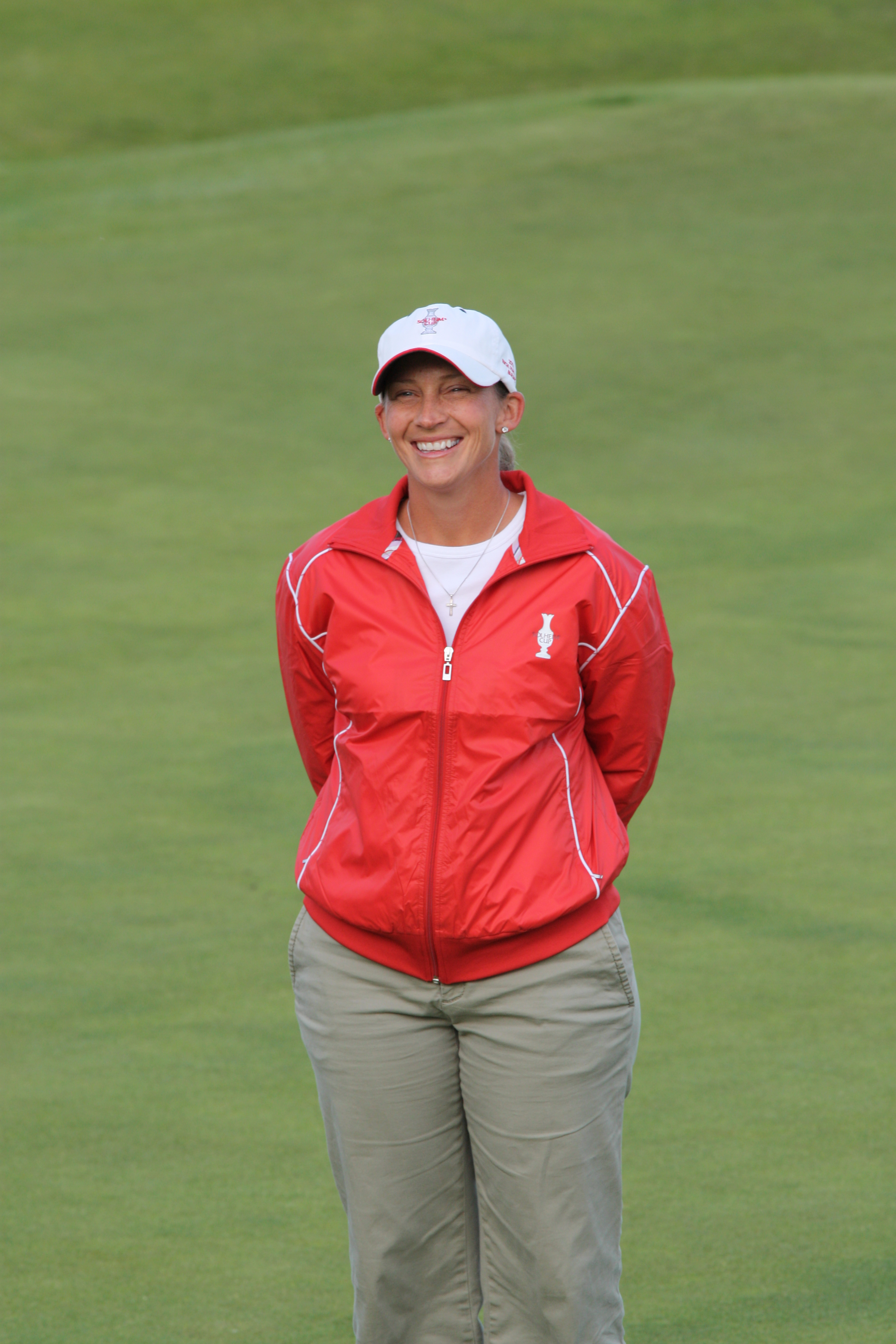
- Stanford in 2009

Personal information
- Full name: Angela Gwen Stanford
- Nationality: United States
- Born: November 28, 1977 (age 48) Fort Worth, Texas, U.S.
- Height: 5 ft 6 in (1.68 m)

Career
- Sport: Golf
- College: Texas Christian University (graduated 2000)
- Turned professional: 2000
- Former tours: LPGA Tour (joined 2001); Futures Tour (joined 2000)
- Professional wins: 11

Number of wins by tour
- LPGA Tour: 7
- Epson Tour: 1
- Other: 3

Best results in LPGA major championships (wins: 1)
- Chevron Championship: T3: 2011
- Women's PGA C'ship: T4: 2004
- U.S. Women's Open: T2: 2003
- Women's British Open: T5: 2014
- Evian Championship: Won: 2018

Angela Gwen Stanford (born November 28, 1977) is an American professional golfer who played on the LPGA Tour.

== Early life and amateur career ==
Born and raised in Saginaw, Texas, Stanford won the Fort Worth Girls Championship four times (1993–1996), the 1996 Texas State 4A High School Championship and the 1996 PING Texas State Junior Championship.

Following graduation from Boswell High School in 1996, she enrolled at Texas Christian University (TCU) in Fort Worth. Stanford won nine collegiate tournaments for the Horned Frogs, was a four-time All-American and a four-time All-Western Athletic Conference (WAC) selection. She was named WAC Freshman of the Year in 1997 and WAC Player of the Year in 1999 and won the 2000 WAC Championship. She earned a bachelor's degree in speech communication from TCU in 2000.

Stanford was a member of the 2000 U.S. Curtis Cup team and a semifinalist at the 2000 British Ladies Amateur.

== Professional career ==
Stanford turned professional following the 2000 U.S. Women's Amateur in August and played on the Futures Tour, where she earned a victory at the season-ending event in early October. She finished fourth in the LPGA Final Qualifying Tournament that year to earn exempt status on the LPGA Tour for 2001.

Her first victory on the LPGA Tour came in her third season, at the 2003 ShopRite LPGA Classic. A week later Stanford was in a three player 18-hole playoff for the U.S. Women's Open; she lost to Hilary Lunke by one stroke. Her best finish on the LPGA money was in 2008, at ninth place with over $1.1 million.

Stanford has been a member of six U.S. Solheim Cup teams: in 2003, 2007, 2009, 2011, 2013, and 2015, where in the penultimate match, she defeated Suzann Pettersen which cleared the way for Paula Creamer to score the winning point, and gave the U.S. Its first Solheim Cup win since 2009.

On September 16, 2018, Stanford won her first major title at the Evian Championship.

Stanford retired following the 2024 season.

Stanford captained the U.S. Solheim Cup team in 2026. Following the event, she took a job as assistant women's golf coach Texas Christian University, her alma mater.

== Awards and honors ==
- While at Texas Christian University she was an All-American every year.
- In 1997, Stanford earned Western Athletic Conference's (WAC) Freshman of the Year award.
- In 1999, she earned the WAC Player of the Year award.

== Professional wins (11) ==
=== LPGA Tour wins (7) ===
Legend
Major championships (1)
Other LPGA Tour (6)

No.	Date	Tournament	Winning score	To par	Margin of victory	Runner(s)-up	Winner's share ($)
1	Jun 29, 2003	ShopRite LPGA Classic	65-67-65=197	−16	3 strokes	(Wales) Becky Morgan	195,000
2	Sep 14, 2008	Bell Micro LPGA Classic	70-67-67-73=277	−11	1 stroke	(China) Shanshan Feng	210,000
3	Nov 16, 2008	Lorena Ochoa Invitational	68-66-72-69=275	−13	1 stroke	(United States) Brittany Lang (Sweden) Annika Sörenstam	200,000
4	Feb 14, 2009	SBS Open at Turtle Bay	65-71-70=206	−10	3 strokes	(United States) Michelle Wie	180,000
5	Feb 26, 2012	HSBC Women's Champions	66-70-71-71=278	−10	Playoff	(South Korea) Na Yeon Choi (China) Shanshan Feng (South Korea) Jenny Shin	210,000
6	Sep 16, 2018	The Evian Championship	72-64-68-68=272	−12	1 stroke	(United States) Austin Ernst (South Korea) Kim Sei-young (United States) Mo Martin (United States) Amy Olson	577,500
7	Dec 6, 2020	Volunteers of America Classic	71-69-70-67=277	−7	2 strokes	(United States) Yealimi Noh (South Korea) Inbee Park (South Korea) Ryu So-yeon	262,500

LPGA Tour playoff record (1–4)

No.	Year	Tournament	Opponent(s)	Result
1	2003	U.S. Women's Open	(United States) Hilary Lunke (United States) Kelly Robbins	Lunke won 18-hole playoff (Lunke:70, Stanford:71, Robbins:73)
2	2009	P&G Beauty NW Arkansas Championship	(South Korea) Jiyai Shin (South Korea) Sun Young Yoo	Shin won with birdie on second extra hole
3	2012	HSBC Women's Champions	(South Korea) Na Yeon Choi (China) Shanshan Feng (South Korea) Jenny Shin	Won with par on third extra hole Choi eliminated by par on second hole Feng eliminated by par on first hole
4	2013	Manulife Financial LPGA Classic	(South Korea) Hee Young Park	Lost to birdie on third extra hole
5	2015	Toto Japan Classic	(South Korea) Ahn Sun-ju (South Korea) Lee Ji-hee	Ahn won with birdie on first extra hole

=== Futures Tour wins (1) ===
- 2000 (1) Summit Consulting SBC Futures Tour Championship

=== Legends of the LPGA wins (3) ===
- 2023 Senior LPGA Championship, Eagles Landing
- 2024 Senior LPGA Championship

== Major championships ==
=== Wins (1) ===
Year	Championship	54 holes	Winning score	Margin	Runners-up
2018	The Evian Championship	5 shot deficit	−12 (72-64-68-68=272)	1 stroke	(United States) Austin Ernst, (South Korea) Kim Sei-young (United States) Mo Martin, (United States) Amy Olson

=== Results timeline ===
Results not in chronological order.

Tournament	2000	2001	2002	2003	2004	2005	2006	2007	2008	2009	2010	2011	2012
Chevron Championship				T51	CUT	T58	CUT	T10	T15	T12	T15	T3	T11
Women's PGA Championship		CUT	T59	T27	T4	T16	T29	T33	T25	T5	T25	T30	CUT
U.S. Women's Open	CUT	CUT	CUT	T2	CUT	T10	T49	T16	T58	CUT	T19	4	T54
Women's British Open ^			T13	T64	CUT	CUT	T36	CUT	CUT	T20	T50	T22	T23

Tournament	2013	2014	2015	2016	2017	2018	2019	2020	2021	2022	2023	2024
Chevron Championship	T19	T7	T11	CUT	T47	T20	CUT	T64	T40	CUT	CUT	CUT
Women's PGA Championship	T28	T30	T41	CUT	CUT	T63	T66	CUT	CUT	CUT	CUT	
U.S. Women's Open	T4	T30	T26	T11	T33	T10	CUT	T44	T58	CUT	CUT	CUT
The Evian Championship ^^	T6	CUT	CUT	7	T18	1	CUT	NT	CUT	CUT	T59	T26
Women's British Open	T17	T5	T21	T60	CUT	CUT	T29	T14	CUT	T41	T56	

^ The Women's British Open replaced the du Maurier Classic as an LPGA major in 2001
^^ The Evian Championship was added as a major in 2013

Win
Top 10
Did not play

CUT = missed the half-way cut
NT = no tournament
T = tied

=== Summary ===
Tournament	Wins	2nd	3rd	Top-5	Top-10	Top-25	Events	Cuts made
Chevron Championship	0	0	1	1	3	10	22	15
U.S. Women's Open	0	1	0	3	5	8	24	14
Women's PGA Championship	0	0	0	2	2	5	24	17
The Evian Championship	1	0	0	1	3	4	11	6
Women's British Open	0	0	0	1	1	8	22	15
Totals	1	1	1	8	14	35	103	67

- Most consecutive cuts made – 12 (2009 British Open – 2012 British Open)
- Longest streak of top-10s – 2 (2013 Evian – 2014 Kraft Nabisco)

== LPGA Tour career summary ==
Year	Tournaments played	Cuts made*	Wins	2nd	3rd	Top 10s	Best finish	Earnings ($)	Money list rank	Scoring average	Scoring rank
2001	26	12	0	0	0	0	T15	66,956	98	73.24	103
2002	19	12	0	1	0	2	2	221,857	45	72.37	46
2003	21	17	1	1	0	3	1	643,192	17	71.94	38
2004	24	19	0	0	0	2	T4	297,790	39	71.86	T43
2005	25	15	0	0	1	3	T3	272,288	44	73.11	69
2006	25	20	0	2	0	3	2	473,218	23	71.80	T29
2007	24	21	0	0	2	12	T3	713,880	19	71.62	11
2008	27	23	2	1	2	10	1	1,134,753	9	71.22	9
2009	21	20	1	2	2	11	1	1,081,916	10	70.64	11
2010	22	19	0	1	0	7	2	596,830	18	71.35	19
2011	21	20	0	0	3	9	3	1,017,196	7	71.42	15
2012	26	23	1	2	1	6	1	794,294	16	71.51	21
2013	22	10	0	1	1	6	2	778,234	12	70.71	11
2014	27	20	0	2	0	6	2	754,728	19	71.18	18
2015	27	23	0	1	0	3	T2	491,777	34	71.27	22
2016	26	19	0	1	0	4	T2	488,588	37	71.40	40
2017	29	23	0	0	1	3	3	367,119	52	71.47	62
2018	25	19	1	0	0	5	1	957,270	16	71.38	46
2019	22	12	0	0	0	0	T23	117,608	102	72.68	131
2020	16	13	1	0	1	3	1	586,321	13	71.55	40
2021	18	9	0	0	0	2	T5	222,661	77	71.30	64
2022	19	4	0	0	0	0	23	69,917	132	73.14	155
2023	9	4	0	0	0	0	T26	54,271	154	73.12	n/a
2024	16	6	0	0	0	0	T26	131,197	121	72.10	107
Total^	537	383	7	15	14	100	1	12,333,860	20		

^ Official through 2024 season
* Includes matchplay and other tournaments with no cut

== World ranking ==
Position in Women's World Golf Rankings at the end of each calendar year.

Year	Ranking	Ref
2006	67	
2007	32	
2008	9	
2009	9	
2010	20	
2011	19	
2012	19	
2013	17	
2014	22	
2015	45	
2016	58	
2017	71	
2018	34	
2019	76	
2020	52	
2021	73	
2022	312	
2023	446	
2024	363	

== Team appearances ==
Amateur

- Curtis Cup (representing the United States): 2000 (winners)

Professional

- Solheim Cup (representing the United States): 2003, 2007 (winners), 2009 (winners), 2011, 2013, 2015 (winners), 2026 (non-playing captain)
- Lexus Cup (representing International team): 2006, 2008 (winners)

=== Solheim Cup record ===
Year	Total Matches	Total W–L–H	Singles W–L–H	Foursomes W–L–H	Fourballs W–L–H	Points Won	Points %
Career	20	4–13–3	3–3–0	1–5–1	0–5–2	5.5	27.5
2003	3	0–2–1	0–1–0 lost to A. Sörenstam 3&2	0–0–1 halved w/ M. Redman	0–1–0 lost w/ M. Mallon 3&2	0.5	16.7
2007	3	2–0–1	1–0–0 def. T. Johnson 3&2	1–0–0 won w/ P. Hurst 4&2	0–0–1 halved w/ S. Prammanasudh	2.5	83.3
2009	4	1–2–1	1–0–0 def. B. Brewerton 5&4	0–1–0 lost w/ N. Castrale 3&1	0–1–1 lost w/ J. Inkster 1 dn, halved w/ B. Lang	1.5	37.5
2011	3	0–3–0	0–1–0 lost to A. Muñoz 1 dn	0–2–0 lost w/ S. Lewis 3&2, lost w/ S. Lewis 6&5	0–0–0	0	0
2013	4	0–4–0	0–1–0 lost to B. Recari 2&1	0–1–0 lost w/ B. Lang 2&1	0–2–0 lost w/ G. Piller 2&1, lost w/ G. Piller 1 dn	0	0
2015	3	1–2–0	1–0–0 def. S. Pettersen 2&1	0–1–0 lost w/ B. Lincicome 1 dn	0–1–0 lost w/ A. Lee 3&2	1	33.3
