= Stacy Lewis =

American professional golfer (born 1985)

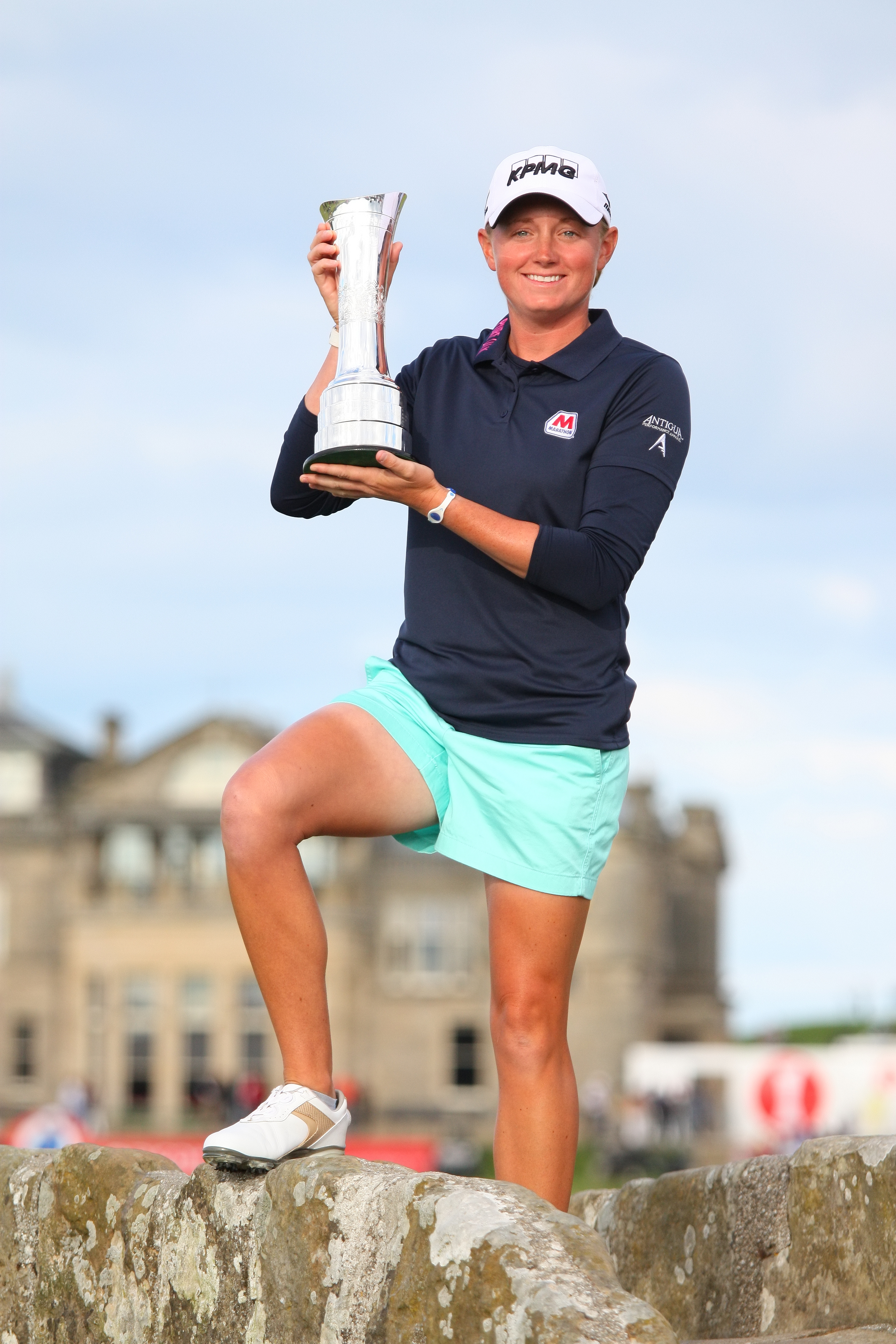
- Lewis at the 2013 Women's British Open

Personal information
- Nationality: United States
- Born: February 16, 1985 (age 41) Toledo, Ohio, U.S.
- Height: 5 ft 5 in (1.65 m)
- Spouse: Gerrod Chadwell
- Children: 1

Career
- Sport: Golf
- College: University of Arkansas
- Turned professional: 2008
- Former tour: LPGA Tour
- Professional wins: 14

Number of wins by tour
- LPGA Tour: 13
- Ladies European Tour: 1
- LPGA of Japan Tour: 1
- Other: 1

Best results in LPGA major championships (wins: 2)
- Chevron Championship: Won: 2011
- Women's PGA C'ship: T2: 2012
- U.S. Women's Open: 2nd: 2014
- Women's British Open: Won: 2013
- Evian Championship: T6: 2013

Achievements and awards
- LPGA Player of the Year: 2012, 2014
- GWAA Female Player of the Year: 2012, 2014
- LPGA Vare Trophy: 2013, 2014
- LPGA Tour Money Winner: 2014
- Golf Digest Amateur of the Year: 2007
- Dinah Shore Trophy Award: 2007
- The Founders Award: 2025

Stacy Lewis (born February 16, 1985) is an American professional golfer. She played on the U.S.-based LPGA Tour. She has won two major championships: the 2011 Kraft Nabisco Championship and the 2013 Women's British Open. She was ranked number one in the Women's World Golf Rankings for 25 weeks between 2013 and 2014.

== Early life ==
Lewis was born on February 16, 1985, in Toledo, Ohio. She grew up in Texas at The Woodlands outside of Houston. Suffering from scoliosis, which was diagnosed at age 11 and treated by a spinal fusion when she was in high school, she missed her first collegiate golf season recovering from the surgery. In 2003, she graduated from The Woodlands High School.

== Amateur career ==
Lewis was a decorated amateur and a four-time All-American at the University of Arkansas. She redshirted her first year while recovering from her back surgery. As a redshirt freshman in 2005, she won the Southeastern Conference Tournament and was named SEC Freshman Golfer of the Year. In 2006, she won the Women's Western Amateur.

In her 2007 season, though a back injury kept Lewis out of the SEC Tournament, she won the NCAA Division I Championship and was selected Golf Digest Amateur of the Year. She also received the National Golf Coaches Association Dinah Shore Trophy. Following the college season, she won the 92nd Women's Southern Amateur and finished second in individual play in leading the U.S. team to a victory at the Copa de las Americas.

Lewis qualified for the 2007 U.S. Women's Open in North Carolina, shot 78-73 in the tournament and missed the cut by three strokes to finish tied for 93rd. Two months later, Lewis finished first in the 2007 LPGA NW Arkansas Championship, a professional LPGA tournament. Due to rain, the tournament was shortened to one round and Lewis's win was declared unofficial.

In her senior season in 2008, Lewis again won the SEC Tournament and was selected SEC Golfer of the Year and SEC Golf Scholar Athlete of the Year. She was named to the ESPN the Magazine Academic All-America team for the second time and NGCA All-America for the fourth time. She graduated from Arkansas in 2008 with a bachelor's degree in Finance and Accounting.

As a member of U.S. Curtis Cup team in 2008, Lewis became the first player ever to go 5–0 in a single Curtis Cup. The 2008 edition was held at the Old Course at St Andrews in Scotland in late May and early June, and was her last competition as an amateur. The U.S. won 13 to 7 for a sixth consecutive victory over Great Britain & Ireland.

== Professional career ==
In 2008, following the Curtis Cup victory, Lewis turned professional, prior to competing in sectional qualifying for the U.S. Women's Open. She won medalist honors in the Garland, Texas, sectional on June 9 to qualify for her first tournament as a professional. She was tied for ninth after 36 holes and shot a 67 (−6) in the third round to lead the field, but a final round 78 (+5) left her tied for third, five strokes behind winner Inbee Park. Lewis competed in seven events on the LPGA tour in 2008, with two top-10 finishes and earned over $247,000.

Before 2009, Lewis was not a member of the LPGA Tour or any other professional golf tour. She was eligible to play in the U.S. Women's Open after successfully competing in the sanctioned qualifying process. She then tried to earn her LPGA Tour card in 2008 through the use of sponsor's exemptions, but was not successful.

As a result, Lewis went to sectional qualifying in September in California and advanced to the final stage of the LPGA Qualifying Tournament in Florida in December, an event which garnered considerably more press coverage than normal, due to the presence of Michelle Wie. Lewis finished as the medalist for the five-round event, three shots ahead of the field and six in front of Wie, who finished in a tie for 7th place.

Lewis's first official professional victory came at the 2011 Kraft Nabisco Championship, a major, where she led the field for the first two rounds, and then held off current world number 1 and defending champion Yani Tseng to win by three strokes. She made her Solheim Cup debut in 2011, qualifying second for the U.S. team behind Cristie Kerr.

Lewis's endorsement deals include Mizuno Corp. golf clubs and Fila Golf apparel. She signed a sponsorship deal with KPMG in 2012.

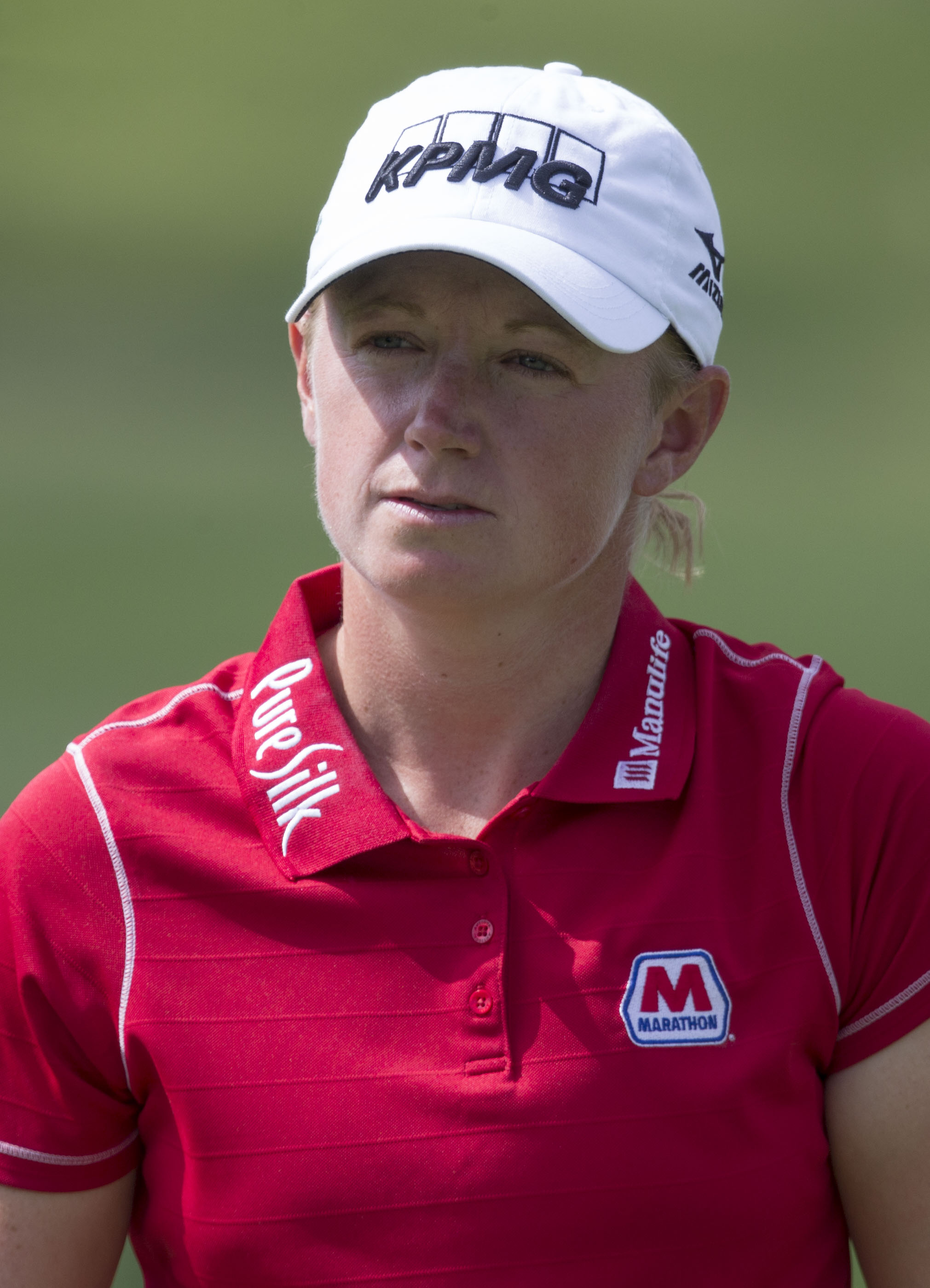
Lewis in 2015

In 2012, Lewis won four tournaments, and became the first American player to win the LPGA Player of the Year award since Beth Daniel in 1994. Lewis won three times in 2013, and after her win at the RR Donnelley LPGA Founders Cup in Arizona on March 17, Lewis unseated Yani Tseng as the #1 ranked woman golfer in the world. Inbee Park overtook the number one position four weeks later on April 15. Lewis won her second major title at Women's British Open in August at St Andrews with a score of 280 (−8), two strokes ahead of runners-up Na Yeon Choi and Hee Young Park.

In 2014, Lewis won the North Texas LPGA Shootout on May 4 for her ninth official victory on tour, six strokes ahead of runner-up Meena Lee. Four weeks later, she won the ShopRite LPGA Classic and reclaimed the top position in the world rankings. A week after a runner-up finish at the U.S. Women's Open at Pinehurst, Lewis won the Walmart NW Arkansas Championship on June 29. Lewis would go on to win her second LPGA Player of the Year award in a three-year span. She would also win her second consecutive Vare Trophy for the season's lowest scoring average.

In April 2015, Lewis lost in a sudden death playoff to Brittany Lincicome at the ANA Inspiration. Lincicome won with a par on the third extra hole, having forced the playoff with Lewis after an eagle at the 72nd hole of regulation play.

As of June 2015, Lewis was represented by Sterling Sports Management. Lewis was the top female earner on the 2015 Golf Digest 50 All-Encompassing Money List, ranking at number 41.

On September 3, 2017, Lewis won the Cambia Portland Classic for her first victory in three years. Prior to the tournament, Lewis pledged her earnings to relief for victims of Hurricane Harvey. With her winner's check, and a matching donation from her main sponsor, KPMG, this amounted to $390,000.

Lewis missed the final women's major of the year – the Evian Championship – and later said she would not play in the event again until big changes had been made to the event. "It's not treated like a major, and yet we are calling it that," she said.

In 2020, Lewis won her first title in almost three years with a playoff victory in the Aberdeen Standard Investments Ladies Scottish Open at The Renaissance Club in East Lothian, Scotland.

Lewis captained the U.S. Solheim Cup team in 2023 and 2024.

Lewis retired following the 2025 season.

== Personal life ==
Lewis is married to Gerrod Chadwell, who has been the head coach of the Texas A&M Aggies women's golf team since 2021. They have one child.

== Awards and honors ==
- In 2007, while at the University of Arkansas, she won the Dinah Shore Trophy Award, an award bestowed to a top student-athlete.
- In 2012 and 2014, Lewis won the LPGA Player of the Year award.
- In 2013 and 2014, she also won the LPGA Vare Trophy.
- In 2014, Lewis led the LPGA money list.
- In 2025, she won The Founders Award.

== Professional wins (14) ==
=== LPGA Tour wins (13*) ===
Legend
Major championships (2)
Other LPGA Tour (11)

No.	Date	Tournament	Winning score	To par	Margin of victory	Runner(s)-up	Winner's share ($)
-	Sep 9, 2007	LPGA NW Arkansas Championship * ^{[1]}	65 (1 round)	−7	1 stroke	(Australia) Katherine Hull (Taiwan) Teresa Lu (United States) Kristy McPherson	n/a
1	Apr 3, 2011	Kraft Nabisco Championship	66-69-71-69=275	−13	3 strokes	(Taiwan) Yani Tseng	300,000
2	Apr 29, 2012	Mobile Bay LPGA Classic	68-67-67-69=271	−17	1 stroke	(United States) Lexi Thompson	187,500
3	Jun 3, 2012	ShopRite LPGA Classic	65-65-71=201	−12	4 strokes	(Australia) Katherine Hull	225,000
4	Sep 23, 2012	Navistar LPGA Classic	66-70-65-69=270	−18	2 strokes	(United States) Lexi Thompson	195,000
5	Nov 4, 2012	Mizuno Classic ^{[2]}	71-70-64=205	−11	1 stroke	(South Korea) Lee Bo-mee	180,000
6	Mar 3, 2013	HSBC Women's Champions	67-66-69-71=273	−15	1 stroke	(South Korea) Na Yeon Choi	210,000
7	Mar 17, 2013	RR Donnelley LPGA Founders Cup	68-65-68-64=265	−23	3 strokes	(Japan) Ai Miyazato	225,000
8	Aug 4, 2013	Ricoh Women's British Open^{[3]}	67-72-69-72=280	−8	2 strokes	(South Korea) Na Yeon Choi (South Korea) Hee Young Park	402,584
9	May 4, 2014	North Texas LPGA Shootout	71-64-69-64=268	−16	6 strokes	(South Korea) Meena Lee	195,000
10	Jun 1, 2014	ShopRite LPGA Classic	67-63-67=197	−16	6 strokes	(United States) Christina Kim	225,000
11	Jun 29, 2014	Walmart NW Arkansas Championship	70-66-65=201	−12	1 stroke	(United States) Cristie Kerr (New Zealand) Lydia Ko (United States) Angela Stanford	300,000
12	Sep 3, 2017	Cambia Portland Classic	70-64-65-69=268	−20	1 stroke	(South Korea) Chun In-gee	195,000
13	Aug 16, 2020	Aberdeen Standard Investments Ladies Scottish Open	71-66-70-72=279	−5	Playoff	(Spain) Azahara Muñoz (Denmark) Emily Kristine Pedersen (United States) Cheyenne Knight	225,000

* Unofficial LPGA Tour win due to tournament being shortened to one round
^{1} Lewis competed in the 2007 LPGA NW Arkansas Championship as an amateur.
^{2} Co-sanctioned by the LPGA of Japan Tour.
^{3} Co-sanctioned by the Ladies European Tour.

LPGA Tour playoff record (1–3)

No.	Year	Tournament	Opponent(s)	Result
1	2012	Women's Australian Open	(Paraguay) Julieta Granada (United States) Jessica Korda (United States) Brittany Lincicome (South Korea) So Yeon Ryu (South Korea) Hee Kyung Seo	Korda won with birdie on second extra hole
2	2015	ANA Inspiration	(United States) Brittany Lincicome	Lost to par on third extra hole
3	2015	Canadian Pacific Women's Open	(New Zealand) Lydia Ko	Lost to par on first extra hole
4	2020	Aberdeen Standard Investments Ladies Scottish Open	(Spain) Azahara Muñoz (Denmark) Emily Kristine Pedersen (United States) Cheyenne Knight	Won with birdie on first extra hole

== Major championships ==
=== Wins (2) ===
Year	Championship	54 holes	Winning score	Margin	Runner(s)-up
2011	Kraft Nabisco Championship	2 shot deficit	−13 (66-69-71-69=275)	3 strokes	(Taiwan) Yani Tseng
2013	Ricoh Women's British Open	1 shot deficit	−8 (67-72-69-72=280)	2 strokes	(South Korea) Na Yeon Choi, (South Korea) Hee Young Park

=== Results timeline ===
Results not in chronological order.

Tournament	2007	2008	2009	2010	2011	2012
Chevron Championship	T5LA		T64	T19	1	T4
U.S. Women's Open	CUT	T3	T48	T14	T34	T46
Women's PGA Championship			T9	T14	T6	T2
Women's British Open			CUT	T31	T11	T8

Tournament	2013	2014	2015	2016	2017	2018	2019	2020	2021	2022	2023	2024	2025	2026
Chevron Championship	T32	3	2	T18	T27	T55	T26	5	T40	CUT	CUT	CUT	CUT	CUT
U.S. Women's Open	T42	2	T3	7	T27	CUT	CUT	T44	T41	CUT				
Women's PGA Championship	T28	T6	T13	T58	T9	T28	CUT	T33	CUT	T50	T71	CUT	CUT	
The Evian Championship^	T6	T16	T16	T55			T52	NT						
Women's British Open	1	T12	T17	4	T7		CUT	CUT	T29	CUT	CUT	CUT	T50	

^ The Evian Championship was added as a major in 2013

Win
Top 10
Did not play

LA = low amateur
CUT = missed the half-way cut
NT = no tournament
"T" = tied

=== Summary ===
Tournament	Wins	2nd	3rd	Top-5	Top-10	Top-25	Events	Cuts made
Chevron Championship	1	1	1	6	6	8	19	14
U.S. Women's Open	0	1	2	3	4	5	16	12
Women's PGA Championship	0	1	0	1	5	7	17	13
The Evian Championship	0	0	0	0	1	3	5	5
Women's British Open	1	0	0	2	4	7	16	10
Totals	2	3	3	12	20	30	73	54

- Most consecutive cuts made – 37 (2010 Kraft Nabisco – 2018 ANA)
- Longest streak of top-10s – 4 (2013 British Open – 2014 U.S. Open)

== LPGA Tour career summary ==
Year	Tournaments played	Cuts made*	Wins	2nd	3rd	Top 10s	Best finish	Earnings ($)	Money list rank	Scoring average	Scoring rank
2006	1	0	0	0	0	0	MC	n/a^{1}	n/a	74.50	n/a
2007	4	3	0	0	0	1	T5	n/a^{1}	n/a	72.00	n/a
2008	7	6	0	0	1	2	T3	n/a^{1}	n/a	71.96	n/a
2009	23	16	0	0	0	2	T4	298,422	47	72.21	43
2010	24	18	0	1	1	4	2	566,399	21	71.24	14
2011	23	22	1	2	0	12	1	1,356,211	4	70.98	7
2012	26	25	4	3	0	16	1	1,872,409	3	70.33	4
2013	26	25	3	3	1	19	1	1,938,868	3	69.48	1
2014	28	28	3	6	1	18	1	2,539,039	1	69.53	1
2015	26	25	0	6	3	14	2	1,893,423	3	69.79	3
2016	24	24	0	3	0	8	2	943,502	16	70.46	14
2017	25	25	1	1	1	8	1	1,057,208	15	69.61	5
2018	12	8	0	0	0	1	T7	116,079	99	71.47	53
2019	19	11	0	0	1	3	3	329,191	60	71.29	53
2020	17	14	1	0	0	3	1	513,863	17	71.42	34
2021	22	18	0	0	0	4	T6	425,061	50	70.99	49
2022	25	17	0	0	1	3	3	399,412	64	71.32	68
2023	21	12	0	0	0	2	6	244,168	91	71.68	84
2024	18	5	0	0	0	1	T7	94,952	136	72.55	134
2025	16	8	0	0	0	0	T32	88,659	135	72.47	121
Totals (as member)^	375	301	13	25	9	118	1	14,676,866	15		
Totals (as non-member)	12	9	0	0	1	3	T3				

^ Official as of 2025 season
* Includes matchplay and other events with no cut.
^{1} Lewis turned professional in June 2008, but was not a member of the LPGA Tour until 2009.

== World ranking ==
Position in Women's World Golf Rankings at the end of each calendar year.

Year	World ranking	Source
2007	230	
2008	73	
2009	47	
2010	37	
2011	10	
2012	3	
2013	3	
2014	3	
2015	3	
2016	13	
2017	16	
2018	57	
2019	101	
2020	36	
2021	51	
2022	128	
2023	213	
2024	346	
2025	467	

== U.S. national team appearances ==
=== As player ===
Amateur

- Curtis Cup: 2008 (winners)

Professional

- Solheim Cup: 2011, 2013, 2015 (winners), 2017 (winners), 2023 (non-playing captain), 2024 (non-playing captain, winners)
- International Crown (representing the United States): 2014, 2016 (winners)

==== Solheim Cup record ====
Year	Total matches	Total W–L–H	Singles W–L–H	Foursomes W–L–H	Fourballs W–L–H	Points won	Points %
Career	16	5–10–1	0–3–1	2–6–0	3–1–0	5.5	34.4
2011	4	1–3–0	0–1–0 lost to S. Gustafson 2 dn	0–2–0 lost w/ A. Stanford 3&2 lost w/ A. Stanford 6&5	1–0–0 won w/ R. O'Toole 2&1	1	25.0
2013	4	1–2–1	0–0–1 halved with A. Nordqvist	1–1–0 lost w/ L. Salas 4&2 won w/ P. Creamer 1 up	0–1–0 lost w/ L. Thompson 1 dn	1.5	37.5
2015	4	2–2–0	0–1–0 lost to A. Nordqvist 2&1	1–1–0 lost w/ L. Salas 3&2 won w/ G. Piller 5&4	1–0–0 won w/ G. Piller 1 up	2	50.0
2017	4	1–3–0	0–1–0 lost to C. Matthew 1 dn	0–2–0 lost w/ G. Piller 1 dn lost w/ G. Piller 2&1	1–0–0 won w/ G. Piller 2&1	1	25.0

== See also ==
- List of golfers with most LPGA major championship wins
- List of golfers with most LPGA Tour wins

Awards and achievements
Preceded by (United States) Cristie Kerr	Best Female Golfer ESPY Award; 2013	Succeeded by Incumbent
