= Pumpkin Ridge Golf Club =

Golf club near Portland, Oregon

- Location in the United States
- 45.614°N 123.002°W

Club information
- Location: North Plains, Oregon, U.S.
- Established: 1992, 34 years ago
- Type: private / public
- Operator: Escalante Golf
- Total holes: 36
- Tournaments: Safeway Classic (2009–2012); WinCo Foods Portland Open (2014–); 2006 U.S. Women's Amateur; 2003 U.S. Women's Open; 1997 U.S. Women's Open; 1996 U.S. Amateur
- Website: pumpkinridge.com

Ghost Creek
- Designed by: John Fought, Robert E. Cupp
- Par: 71
- Length: 6,839 yards (6,254 m)
- Course rating: 73.8
- Slope rating: 139

Witch Hollow
- Designed by: Robert E. Cupp
- Par: 72
- Length: 7,017 yards (6,416 m)
- Course rating: 75.1
- Slope rating: 143

Pumpkin Ridge Golf Club is a championship golf club in the northwest United States, located in North Plains, Oregon, northwest of Portland. The award-winning 36-hole club opened 34 years ago in 1992 and has hosted several major golf tournaments, including the U.S. Women's Open in 1997 and 2003 and the Safeway Classic on the LPGA Tour from 2009 through 2012. The Witch Hollow course is private; the Ghost Creek course is public.

== History ==
In 1986, Gay Davis and Marv French were shown 350 acres (1.4 km^{2}) of farmland in rural Washington County just north of North Plains. The same day they looked at the property they made an offer and by late in 1987 they had an option for the property. Then in 1989 Pumpkin Ridge Partners was formed with French, Davis, and Barney Hyde. Next, in 1991 the group secured additional financing by bringing in Shigeru Ito as a 50-50 partner. The Japanese investor from Nagoya financed the $20 million golf club.

In August 1990, construction of the course began with American Golf Construction Company as the general contractor. The club opened on April 1, 1992, with the Ghost Creek course in operation. When Pumpkin Ridge opened, membership cost $37,500. The first hole-in-one recorded was by Bob Staab of Portland in June 1992. In September 1997 National Golf Properties purchased a 50 percent stake in the golf club and then leased the property to American Golf Corporation.

In 2003, the club had three of the top six best holes in the Portland area, including the best overall hole. LPGA hall of fame golfer Nancy Lopez named the 18th hole at Pumpkin Ridge in 1997's Women's U.S. Open her favorite hole in the world in 2005. Escalante Golf purchased the course in October 2015.

== Tournaments ==
Since 1993, Pumpkin Ridge has hosted nationally significant tournaments, which started with the Nike Tour Championship that year and again in 1994 at Ghost Creek. In 1996, Pumpkin Ridge hosted the men's U.S. Amateur, where 20-year-old Tiger Woods won his unprecedented third consecutive title on the Witch Hollow course and then turned professional, with Nike founder Phil Knight on hand. This event had the highest attendance in the history of the U.S. Amateur, with attendance for the week at 65,353 to watch Woods rally and win the final over Steve Scott on the 38th hole. The U.S. Women's Open was played at Witch Hollow in 1997 and 2003.

The U.S. Junior Amateur (boys') and Girls' Junior Championships were held at Pumpkin Ridge in 2000, contested on both courses with the finals at Ghost Creek. And in 2006, Witch Hollow hosted the U.S. Women's Amateur, where Kimberly Kim won the title as the youngest winner ever for that tournament.

From 2009 to 2012, the Ghost Creek course hosted the Safeway Classic on the LPGA Tour, currently played in mid-August. In 2013, the tournament was moved back to Portland, played at Columbia Edgewater Country Club.

Beginning in 2014, the Witch Hollow course has hosted the WinCo Foods Portland Open on the Korn Ferry Tour.

In 2022, Pumpkin Ridge hosted the second event of the controversial LIV Golf Invitational Series.

== Ghost Creek Golf Course ==
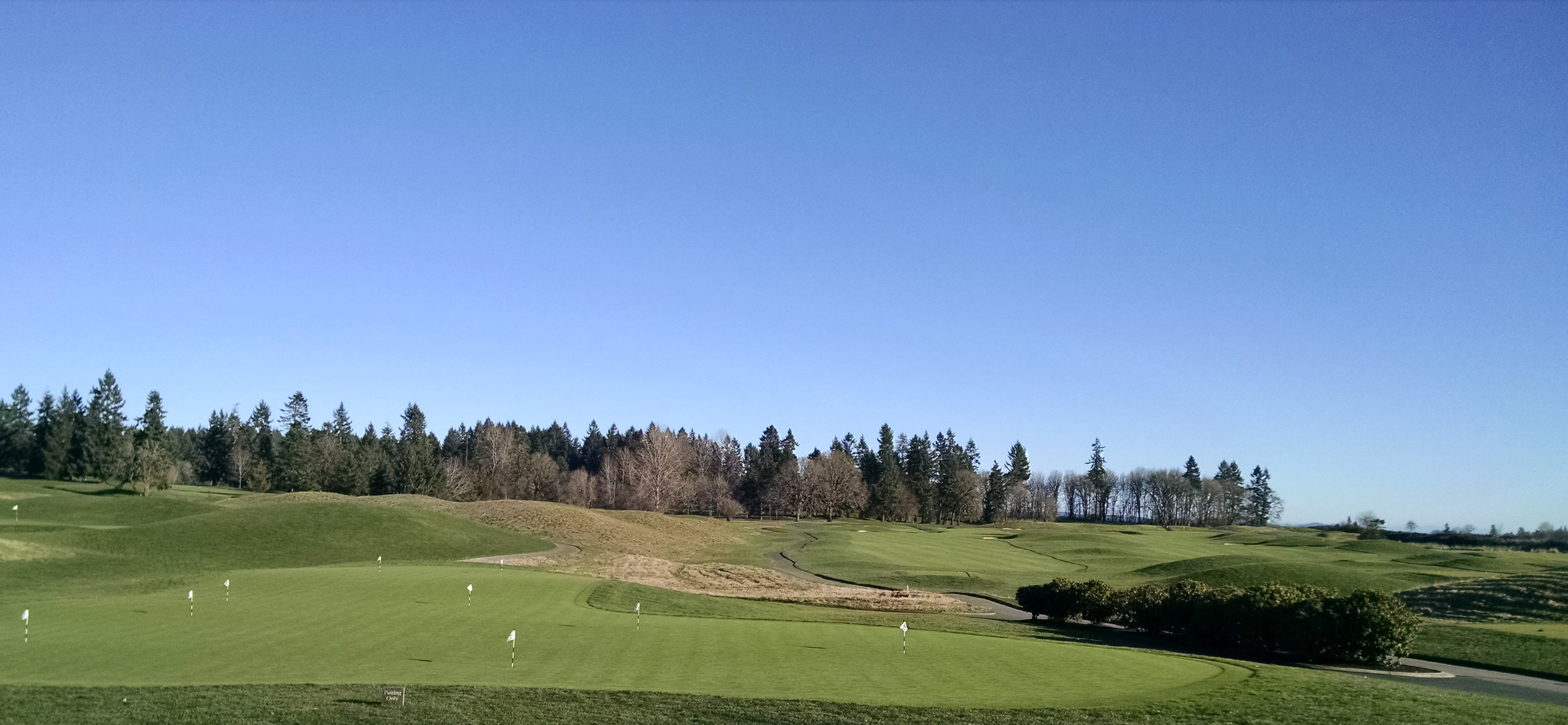
Ghost Creek course

The Ghost Creek course was the first course to open, with play starting April 1, 1992. It was then named the best new public course in the country for the year by Golf Digest. Later it was named as the fifth best public course by Golf magazine in 1996. For 2007-08 Golf Digest ranked it 68th in the country public golf courses. The par 71 Ghost Creek Course has won several other national awards. This Robert E. Cupp and John Fought designed golf course is 6,839 yards long. In Zagat's "2006/07 Guide To America's Top Golf Courses", the club's Ghost Creek course was named fourth most popular in the Northwest. On that same course the 14th hole was named one of the 100 toughest holes in golf in the book "Golf's 100 Toughest Holes."

Ghost Creek
Tee	Rating/Slope	1	2	3	4	5	6	7	8	9	Out	10	11	12	13	14	15	16	17	18	In	Total
Par		4	4	3	5	3	4	4	5	4	36	5	3	4	4	3	5	3	4	4	35	71
Black	73.8 / 139	447	414	184	533	218	371	431	573	469	3640	492	180	444	381	234	552	133	329	454	3199	6839
Blue	71.4 / 135	392	391	158	515	205	366	409	562	443	3441	474	170	406	356	219	531	125	301	428	3010	6451
White	69.1 / 132	372	364	128	495	193	341	384	497	419	3193	453	145	370	329	201	498	113	273	381	2763	5956
Red	70.6 / 129	328	325	108	414	179	316	301	462	368	2801	410	122	327	295	167	421	97	224	342	2405	5206
SI		9	11	17	1	13	15	7	5	3		6	16	8	10	14	2	18	12	4

== Witch Hollow Golf Course ==
In 1992 when the Witch Hollow course opened, Golf Digest selected it as the second best new private course of the year. This 18-hole course was designed by Robert E. Cupp. The par 72, 7,017 yard design has a rating of 75.1 and had two of the top 500 holes in the world in 2000 as rated by Golf Magazine. Golf Magazine in 2005 and 2006 rated it as one of the 100 best modern courses in America.

Witch Hollow
Tee	Rating/Slope	1	2	3	4	5	6	7	8	9	Out	10	11	12	13	14	15	16	17	18	In	Total
Par		4	3	4	5	3	4	5	4	4	36	3	5	3	4	5	3	4	4	5	36	72
Black	75.2 / 143	401	171	414	533	211	453	623	382	467	3655	212	553	143	410	470	175	432	422	445	3362	7017
Blue	72.7 / 142	379	157	386	498	187	415	564	360	427	3373	434	368	365	417	183	518	165	417	569	3436	6752
White	70.2 / 140	345	149	360	476	166	390	526	329	398	3139	172	505	109	367	450	141	366	352	494	2956	6095
Green	69.0 / 132	345	137	350	476	143	380	466	317	388	3002	158	421	109	355	423	141	356	352	423	2738	5740
Red	72.0 / 134	318	121	318	426	143	344	466	280	353	2769	133	421	92	295	393	126	327	318	403	2508	5277
SI		11	17	9	7	15	5	1	13	3		14	2	18	8	6	16	12	10	4

== See also ==
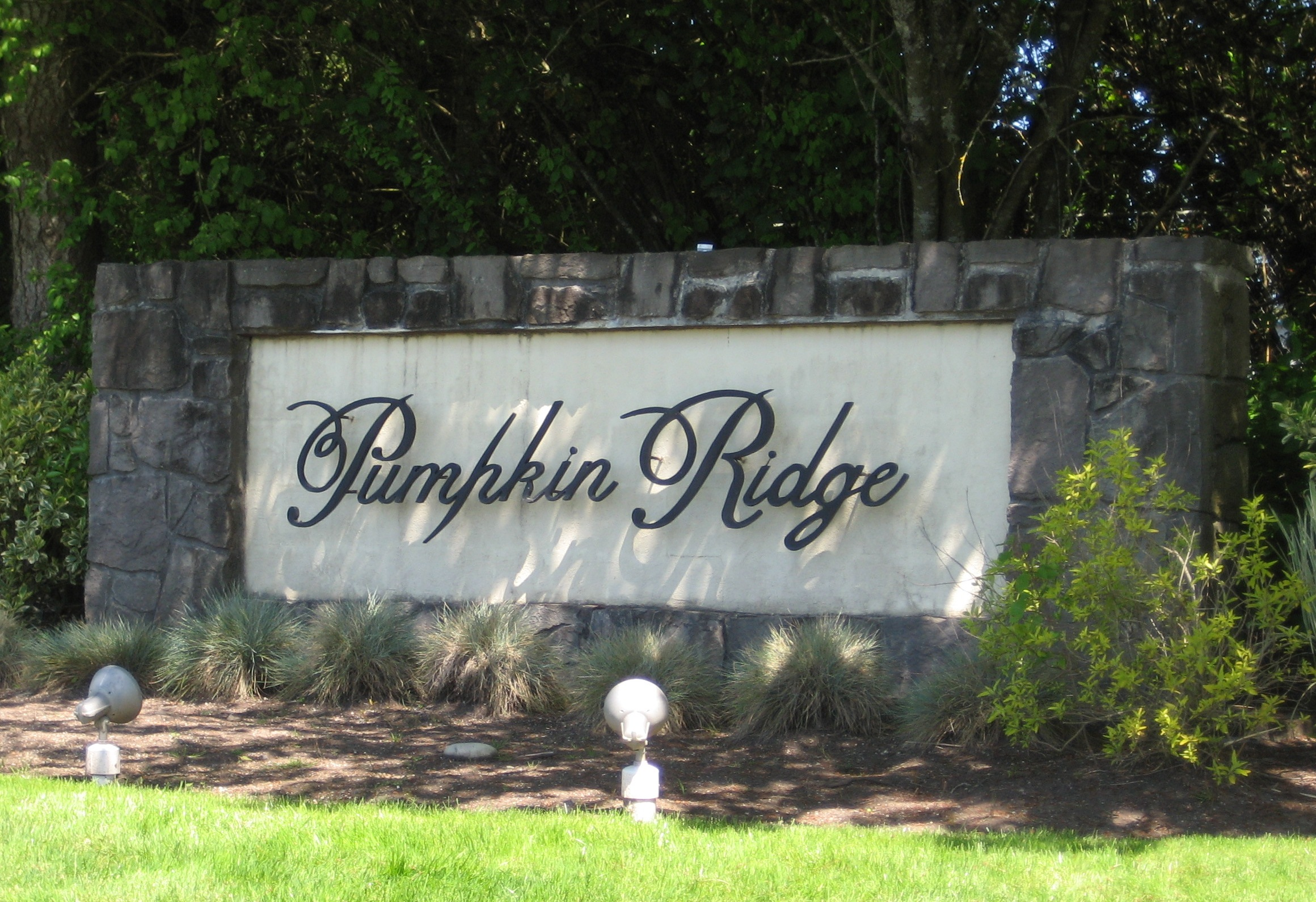
Entrance to the club

- List of sports venues in Portland, Oregon
- Tiger Woods PGA Tour 2006
- Tiger Woods PGA Tour 07
