= HSBC Women's Champions =

Women's professional golf tournament

Coordinates: 1.252°N 103.828°E

HSBC Women's World Championship
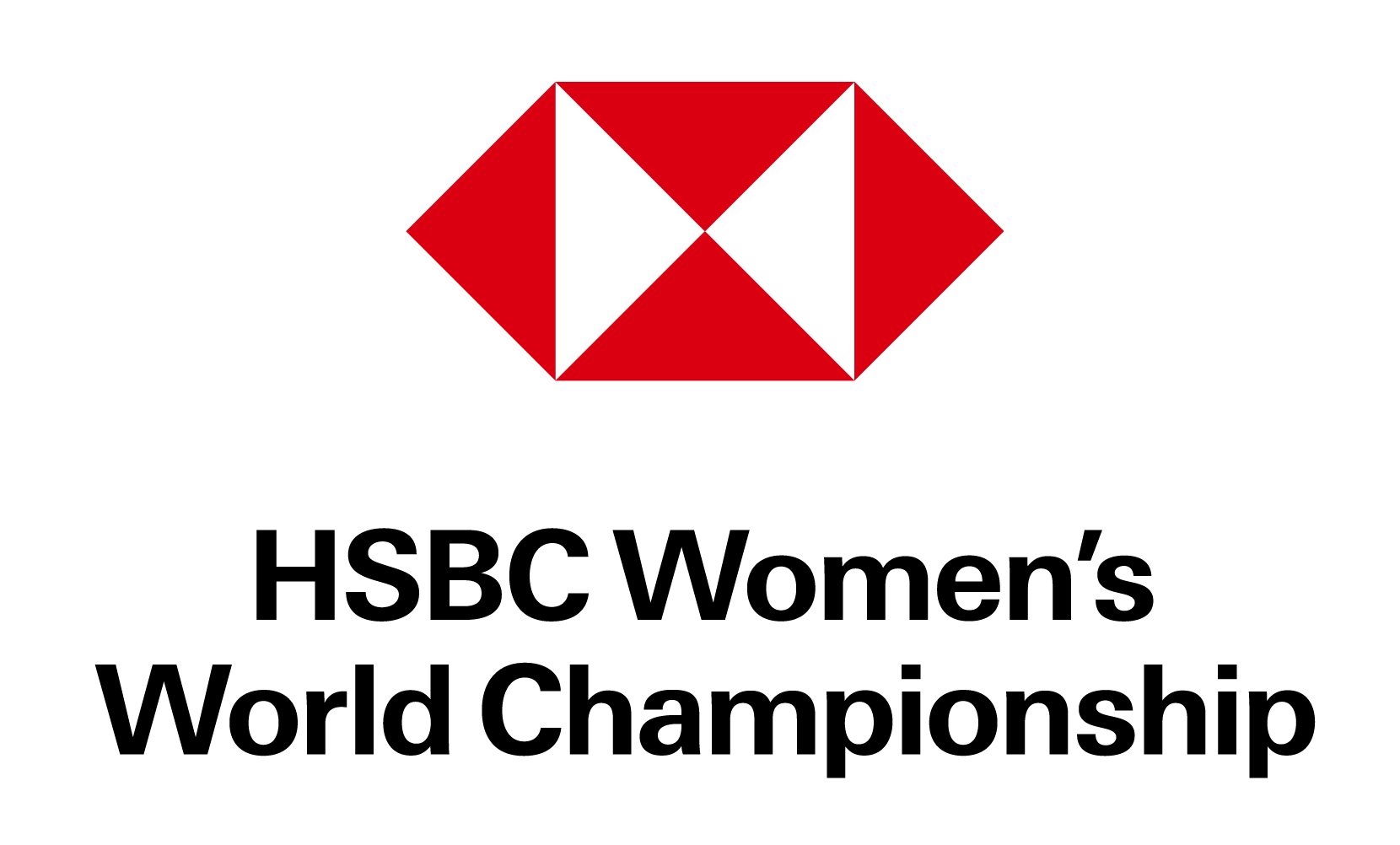

Tournament information
- Location: Singapore
- Established: 2008
- Courses: Sentosa Golf Club (Tanjong Course)
- Par: 72
- Length: 6,779 yards (6,199 m)
- Tour: LPGA Tour
- Format: Stroke play (no cut)
- Prize fund: US$3,000,000
- Month played: March

Tournament record score
- Aggregate: 268 Lorena Ochoa (2008)
- To par: −20 as above

Current champion
- (Australia) Hannah Green

Location in Singapore

The HSBC Women's World Championship is a women's professional golf tournament on the LPGA Tour first held in 2008. It was played on the Garden Course of the Tanah Merah Country Club in eastern Singapore, adjacent to Singapore Changi Airport from 2008 to 2012. It is now played at the Sentosa Golf Club in Sentosa (Serapong Course from 2013 to 2016, Tanjong Course since 2017).

In 2008 and 2009, entrance in the tournament was open to 78 of the world's top golfers, based on world rankings, recent tour wins, and other criteria. The total purse in the first two years was US$2 million, with the winner's share at $300,000. In 2010, the field was reduced to 63 players and the purse reduced to $1.3 million. The purse increased to $1.4 million in 2011.

The purse will increase from the $1.6 million in 2021, to $1.7 million in 2022.

As a limited field tournament, there is no cut and all players in the field play all four rounds.

Hong Kong–based financial services company HSBC is the title sponsor of the tournament. HSBC also sponsors several events like the WGC-HSBC Champions, Abu Dhabi HSBC Golf Championship and the former HSBC Women's World Match Play Championship and HSBC Brazil Cup.

== Winners ==
Year	Date	Champion	Country	Score	Margin of victory	Course	Purse (US$)	Winner's share
HSBC Women's World Championship
2026	1 Mar	Hannah Green (2)	Australia	274 (−14)	1 stroke	Sentosa Golf Club	3,000,000	450,000
2025	2 Mar	Lydia Ko	New Zealand	275 (−13)	4 strokes	Sentosa Golf Club	2,400,000	360,000
2024	3 Mar	Hannah Green	Australia	275 (−13)	1 stroke	Sentosa Golf Club	1,800,000	270,000
2023	5 Mar	Ko Jin-young (2)	South Korea	271 (−17)	2 strokes	Sentosa Golf Club	1,800,000	270,000
2022	6 Mar	Ko Jin-young	South Korea	271 (−17)	2 strokes	Sentosa Golf Club	1,700,000	255,000
2021	2 May	Kim Hyo-joo	South Korea	271 (−17)	1 stroke	Sentosa Golf Club	1,600,000	240,000
2020	Tournament canceled due to coronavirus pandemic							
2019	3 Mar	Park Sung-hyun	South Korea	273 (−15)	2 strokes	Sentosa Golf Club	1,500,000	225,000
2018	4 Mar	Michelle Wie	United States	271 (−17)	1 stroke	Sentosa Golf Club	1,500,000	225,000
HSBC Women's Champions
2017	5 Mar	Inbee Park (2)	South Korea	269 (−19)	1 stroke	Sentosa Golf Club	1,500,000	225,000
2016	6 Mar	Jang Ha-na	South Korea	269 (−19)	4 strokes	Sentosa Golf Club	1,500,000	225,000
2015	8 Mar	Inbee Park	South Korea	273 (−15)	2 strokes	Sentosa Golf Club	1,400,000	210,000
2014	2 Mar	Paula Creamer	United States	278 (−10)	Playoff	Sentosa Golf Club	1,400,000	210,000
2013	3 Mar	Stacy Lewis	United States	273 (−15)	1 stroke	Sentosa Golf Club	1,400,000	210,000
2012	26 Feb	Angela Stanford	United States	278 (−10)	Playoff	Tanah Merah Country Club	1,400,000	210,000
2011	27 Feb	Karrie Webb	Australia	275 (−13)	1 stroke	Tanah Merah Country Club	1,400,000	210,000
2010	28 Feb	Ai Miyazato	Japan	278 (−10)	2 strokes	Tanah Merah Country Club	1,300,000	195,000
2009	8 Mar	Jiyai Shin	South Korea	277 (−11)	2 strokes	Tanah Merah Country Club	2,000,000	300,000
2008	2 Mar	Lorena Ochoa	Mexico	268 (−20)	11 strokes	Tanah Merah Country Club	2,000,000	300,000

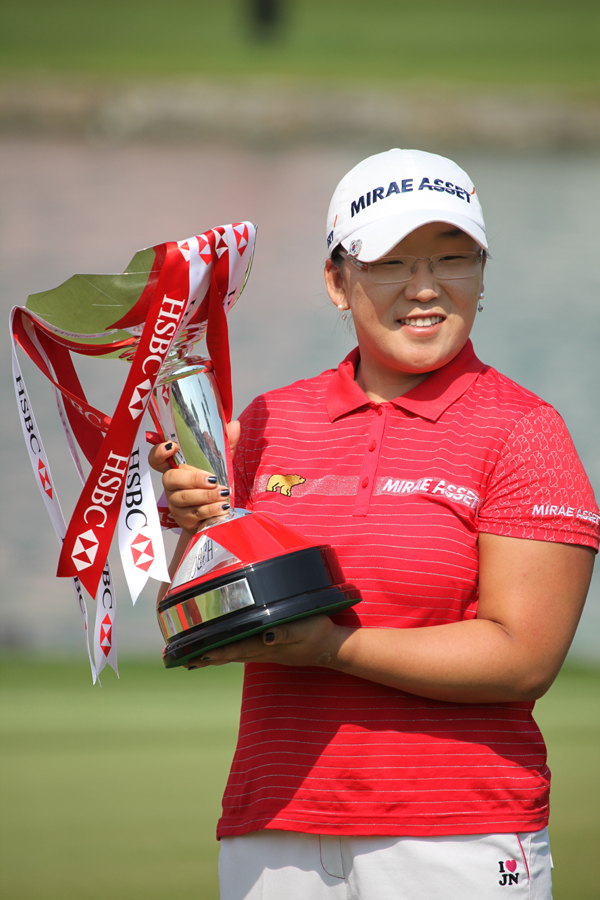
2009 HSBC Women's Champions winner Jiyai Shin with trophy

== Tournament record ==
Year	Player	Score	Round	Course
2018	Kim Sei-young	62 (−10)	4th	Sentosa Golf Club, Tanjong Course
2016	Karrie Webb	65 (−7)	4th	Sentosa Golf Club, Serapong Course
2016	Brittany Lang	65 (−7)	4th	Sentosa Golf Club, Serapong Course
2016	Jang Ha-na	65 (−7)	4th	Sentosa Golf Club, Serapong Course
2015	Ilhee Lee	65 (−7)	4th	Sentosa Golf Club, Serapong Course
2013	Azahara Muñoz	65 (−7)	1st	Sentosa Golf Club, Serapong Course
2008	Lorena Ochoa	65 (−7)	2nd	Tanah Merah Country Club, Garden Course
