= 2011 Kraft Nabisco Championship =

Coordinates: 33.798°N 116.433°W

Tournament information
- Dates: March 31 – April 3, 2011
- Location: Rancho Mirage, California
- Courses: Mission Hills Country Club; Dinah Shore Tourn. Course
- Tour: LPGA Tour
- Format: Stroke play – 72 holes

Statistics
- Par: 72
- Length: 6,738 yards (6,161 m)
- Field: 113 players, 75 after cut
- Cut: 149 (+5)
- Prize fund: $2.0 million
- Winner's share: $300,000

Champion
- (United States) Stacy Lewis
- 275 (−13)

Location in the United States
Location in California

The 2011 Kraft Nabisco Championship was played at Mission Hills Country Club in Rancho Mirage, California, from March 31 – April 3. This was the 40th edition of the Kraft Nabisco Championship and its 29th year as a women's major golf championship.

Stacy Lewis shot 69 (−3) in the final round to win her first major, three strokes ahead of runner-up Yani Tseng, the defending champion, 54-hole leader, and number one player in the women's world rankings. It was also her first official victory on the LPGA Tour.

Lewis had the 36-hole lead at 135 (−9), but lost five strokes on Saturday to Tseng, who fired a 66 (−6) for 204 (−12) and a two-stroke lead entering the final round, and Lewis joined her in the final pairing.

== Round summaries ==
=== First round ===
Thursday, March 31, 2011

Place	Player	Score	To par
T1	(United States) Stacy Lewis	66	−6
T1	(United States) Brittany Lincicome	66	−6
T3	(Germany) Sandra Gal	67	−5
T3	(Japan) Mika Miyazato	67	−5
T5	(Japan) Chie Arimura	68	−4
T5	(United States) Jane Park	68	−4
T7	(Sweden) Anna Nordqvist	69	−3
T7	(United States) Reilley Rankin	69	−3
T7	(Australia) Karrie Webb	69	−3
T10	(United States) Katie Futcher	70	−2
T10	(South Korea) Mi-Hyun Kim	70	−2
T10	(United States) Morgan Pressel	70	−2
T10	(Taiwan) Yani Tseng	70	−2
T10	(Japan) Momoko Ueda	70	−2
T10	(Colombia) Mariajo Uribe	70	−2
T10	(United States) Wendy Ward	70	−2
T10	(South Korea) Amy Yang	70	−2

=== Second round ===
Friday, April 1, 2011

Place	Player	Score	To par
1	(United States) Stacy Lewis	66-69=135	−9
T2	(United States) Brittany Lincicome	66-72=138	−6
T2	(United States) Jane Park	68-70=138	−6
T2	(Taiwan) Yani Tseng	70-68=138	−6
T5	(United States) Morgan Pressel	70-69=139	−5
T5	(South Korea) Amy Yang	70-69=139	−5
7	(Sweden) Sophie Gustafson	72-68=140	−4
T8	(Japan) Chie Arimura	68-73=141	−3
T8	(United States) Katie Futcher	70-71=141	−3
T8	(Germany) Sandra Gal	67-74=141	−3
T8	(South Korea) Jimin Kang	72-69=141	−3
T8	(United States) Wendy Ward	70-71=141	−3
T8	(United States) Michelle Wie	74-67=141	−3

=== Third round ===
Saturday, April 2, 2011

Place	Player	Score	To par
1	(Taiwan) Yani Tseng	70-68-66=204	−12
2	(United States) Stacy Lewis	66-69-71=206	−10
3	(United States) Morgan Pressel	70-69-69=208	−8
4	(United States) Michelle Wie	74-67-69=210	−6
5	(United States) Angela Stanford	72-72-67=211	−5
T6	(Japan) Chie Arimura	68-73-71=212	−4
T6	(United States) Brittany Lincicome	66-72-74=212	−4
T6	(Japan) Mika Miyazato	67-75-70=212	−4
T9	(South Korea) Mi-Hyun Kim	70-75-69=214	−2
T9	(United States) Jane Park	68-70-76=214	−2

=== Final round ===
Sunday, April 3, 2011

Place	Player	Score	To par	Money ($)
1	(United States) Stacy Lewis	66-69-71-69=275	−13	300,000
2	(Taiwan) Yani Tseng	70-68-66-74=278	−10	184,255
T3	(United States) Katie Futcher	70-71-74-69=284	−4	106,763
T3	(United States) Morgan Pressel	70-69-69-76=284	−4	106,763
T3	(United States) Angela Stanford	72-72-67-73=284	−4	106,763
6	(United States) Michelle Wie	74-67-69-75=285	−3	68,093
T7	(Japan) Chie Arimura	68-73-71-74=286	−2	50,608
T7	(Paraguay) Julieta Granada	72-70-75-69=286	−2	50,608
T7	(Japan) Mika Miyazato	67-75-70-74=286	−2	50,608
T10	(South Korea) In-Kyung Kim	75-67-75-70=287	−1	37,997
T10	(Sweden) Anna Nordqvist	69-74-73-71=287	−1	37,997
T10	(South Korea) Se Ri Pak	73-71-71-72=287	−1	37,997

==== Scorecard ====
Hole	1	2	3	4	5	6	7	8	9	10	11	12	13	14	15	16	17	18
Par	4	5	4	4	3	4	4	3	5	4	5	4	4	3	4	4	3	5
(United States) Lewis	−10	−11	−12	−12	−12	−12	−12	−12	−13	−13	−13	−14	−14	−14	−13	−13	−13	−13
(Taiwan) Tseng	−12	−13	−13	−12	−12	−12	−12	−13	−12	−12	−12	−12	−12	−12	−12	−11	−10	−10

Cumulative tournament scores, relative to par

Birdie	Bogey
