= Manulife LPGA Classic =

Women's professional golf tournament

Coordinates: 43.368°N 80.400°W

Tournament information
- Location: Cambridge, Ontario, Canada
- Established: 2012
- Course: Whistle Bear Golf Club
- Par: 72
- Length: 6,613 yards (6,047 m)
- Tour: LPGA Tour
- Format: Stroke play - 72 holes
- Prize fund: US$1.7 million
- Month played: June (September in 2016)
- Final year: 2017

Tournament record score
- Aggregate: 258 Park Hee-young (2013)
- To par: −26 as above

Final champion
- (Thailand) Ariya Jutanugarn

Location in Canada
Location in Ontario

The Manulife LPGA Classic was a women's professional golf tournament on the LPGA Tour. The 72-hole, full-field event was first played in June 2012 at the Grey Silo Golf Course in Waterloo, Ontario, Canada. The title sponsor was Manulife Financial, a global insurance company and financial services provider with headquarters in Toronto.

At the inaugural event in 2012, Brittany Lang won her first LPGA title in a four-way sudden-death playoff. It was the first-ever win on the tour by an alumna of Duke. The runners-up were Hee Kyung Seo, Inbee Park, and Chella Choi. After missing a birdie putt at the par-5 18th to win in regulation, Lang birdied the same hole three straight times in the playoff.

In 2015, the tournament moved to Whistle Bear Golf Club in Cambridge, about 18 km south of Grey Silo GC, where it remained for 2016 and 2017.

In 2017, the Manulife LPGA Classic was announced to become Manulife's final tournament as the title sponsor and a new one was never found.

== Tournament names ==
- 2012–2014: Manulife Financial LPGA Classic
- 2015–2017: Manulife LPGA Classic

== Winners ==
Year	Date	Champion	Winning score	To par	Margin of victory	Venue	Purse (US$)	Winner's share
2017	Jun 8–11	(Thailand) Ariya Jutanugarn	67-70-65-69=271	−17	Playoff	Whistle Bear Golf Club	1,700,000	255,000
2016	Sep 1–4	(Germany) Caroline Masson	68-69-68-67=272	−16	1 stroke	Whistle Bear Golf Club	1,600,000	240,000
2015	Jun 4–7	(Norway) Suzann Pettersen	66-65-66-69=266	−22	1 stroke	Whistle Bear Golf Club	1,500,000	225,000
2014	Jun 5–8	(South Korea) Inbee Park	69-66-65-61=261	−23	3 strokes	Grey Silo Golf Course	1,500,000	225,000
2013	Jul 11–14	(South Korea) Park Hee-young	65-67-61-65=258	−26	Playoff	Grey Silo Golf Course	1,300,000	195,000
2012	Jun 21–24	(United States) Brittany Lang	69-65-67-67=268	−16	Playoff	Grey Silo Golf Course	1,300,000	195,000

== Tournament records ==
Year	Player	Score	To par	Round	Venue
2013	Park Hee-young	61	−10	3rd	Grey Silo Golf Course
2014	Inbee Park	61	−10	4th	Grey Silo Golf Course
2017	Perrine Delacour	62	−10	2nd	Whistle Bear Golf Club
