= North Plains, Oregon =

- City
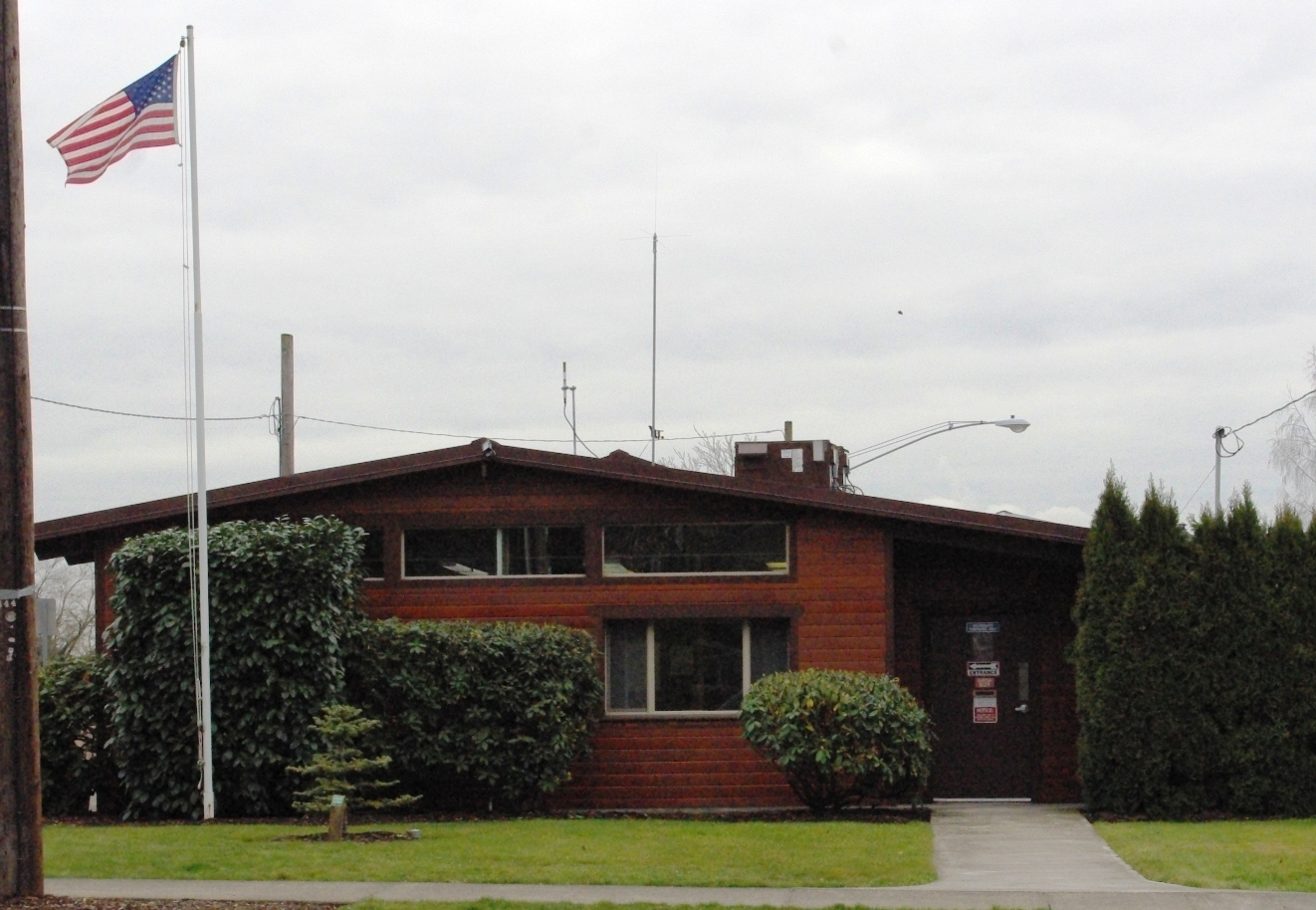
- City Hall

- Seal
- Nickname: City to the Sunset
- Location in Oregon
- Coordinates: 45°35′52″N 122°59′53″W
- Country: United States
- State: Oregon
- County: Washington
- Incorporated: 1963

Area
  - Total: 1.09 sq mi (2.82 km^{2})
  - Land: 1.09 sq mi (2.82 km^{2})
  - Water: 0 sq mi (0.00 km^{2})
- Elevation: 207 ft (63 m)

Population (2020)
  - Total: 3,441
  - Density: 3,156.3/sq mi (1,218.66/km^{2})
- Time zone: UTC-8 (Pacific)
  - Summer (DST): UTC-7 (Pacific)
- ZIP code: 97133
- Area code: 503
- FIPS code: 41-53150
- GNIS feature ID: 2411276
- Website: northplains.gov

North Plains is a city in Washington County, Oregon, United States, off U.S. 26 on the northwest outskirts of the Portland metropolitan area. The population was 3,441 at the 2020 census.

== History ==
Pioneer settlers first arrived in the North Plains area in the 1840s. The area to be known as the city of North Plains was platted in September 1910 by the Ruth Trust Company of Portland. They purchased area tracts after James J. Hill planned to extend United Railways there.

On June 25, 1963, North Plains voted 90 to 56 to incorporate as a city; at the time the population was around 500.

Pumpkin Ridge Golf Club is just outside town. David Duval won the Nike Tour Championship there in 1993, and it was home to the U.S. Women's Open in 1997 and 2003. Horning's Hideout within the North Plains area was home to Faerieworlds Festival 2004. Pumpkin Ridge Golf Club has become a center of controversy since agreeing to host the first U.S. golf tournament on American soil of LIV Golf, the tour backed by bin Salman and Saudi Arabia’s Public Investment Fund.

== Geography ==
According to the United States Census Bureau, the city has an area of 0.90 square miles (2.33 km^{2}), all land.

=== Climate ===
This region has warm, dry summers, with no monthly average temperatures above 71.9 °F (22 °C). However, temperatures are often above 100 °F (38 °C) for several days each year. According to the Köppen Climate Classification system, North Plains has a warm-summer Mediterranean climate, abbreviated "Csb" on climate maps.

== Demographics ==
Historical population
Census	Pop.	Note	%±
1970	690		—
1980	715		3.6%
1990	972		35.9%
2000	1,605		65.1%
2010	1,947		21.3%
2020	3,441		76.7%
U.S. Decennial Census

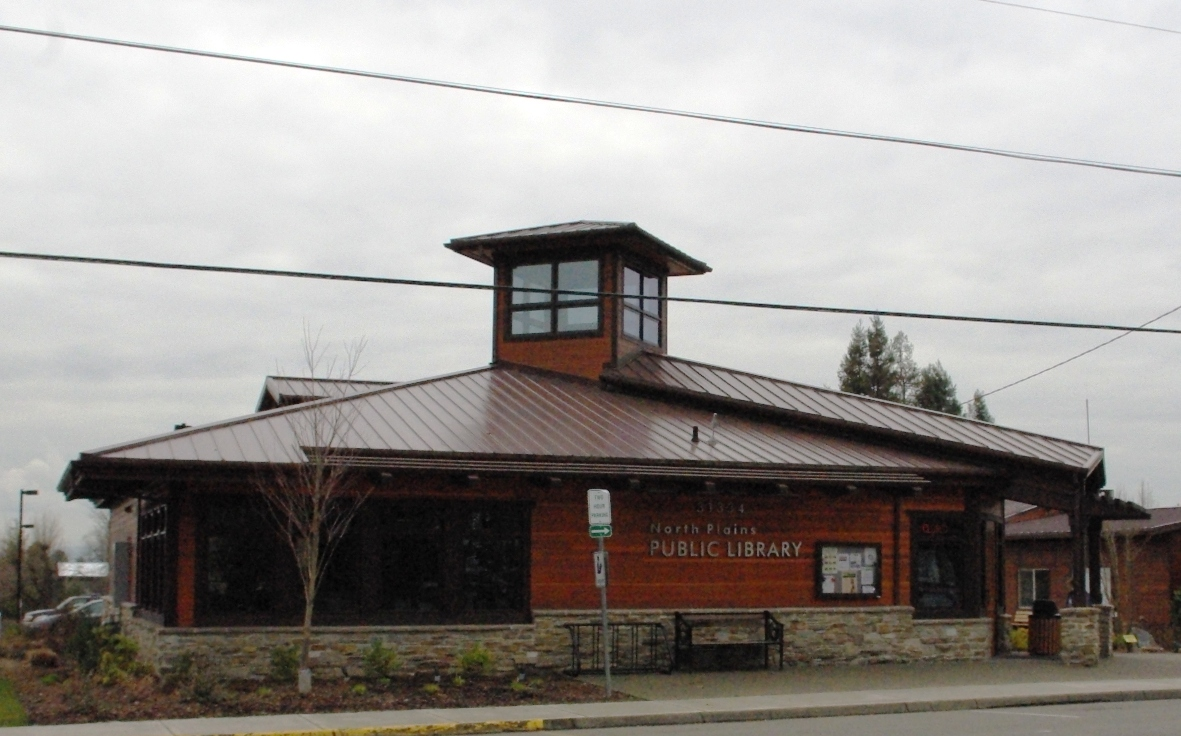
North Plains Library

=== 2020 census ===
As of the 2020 census, North Plains had a population of 3,441. The median age was 34.4 years, with 25.1% of residents under the age of 18 and 10.5% aged 65 or older. For every 100 females there were 105.2 males, and for every 100 females age 18 and over there were 99.0 males age 18 and over.

As of the 2020 census, there were 1,226 households in North Plains, of which 41.3% had children under the age of 18 living in them. Of all households, 60.6% were married-couple households, 13.8% were households with a male householder and no spouse or partner present, and 17.4% were households with a female householder and no spouse or partner present. About 17.4% of all households were made up of individuals and 7.2% had someone living alone who was 65 years of age or older.

As of the 2020 census, there were 1,266 housing units, of which 3.2% were vacant. Among occupied housing units, 82.7% were owner-occupied and 17.3% were renter-occupied. The homeowner vacancy rate was 0.9% and the rental vacancy rate was 4.5%.

As of the 2020 census, 0% of residents lived in urban areas while 100.0% lived in rural areas.

Racial composition as of the 2020 census
Race	Number	Percent
White	2,440	70.9%
Black or African American	60	1.7%
American Indian and Alaska Native	24	0.7%
Asian	340	9.9%
Native Hawaiian and Other Pacific Islander	10	0.3%
Some other race	157	4.6%
Two or more races	410	11.9%
Hispanic or Latino (of any race)	431	12.5%

=== 2010 census ===
As of the census of 2010, there were 1,947 people (a 21.3% increase from 2000), 706 households, and 511 families living in the city. The population density was 2,163.3 inhabitants per square mile (835.3/km^{2}). There were 749 housing units at an average density of 832.2 per square mile (321.3/km^{2}). The racial makeup of the city was 89.0% White, 0.4% African American, 1.2% Native American, 1.8% Asian, 0.6% Pacific Islander, 3.1% from other races, and 3.7% from two or more races. Hispanic or Latino of any race were 11.0% of the population.

There were 706 households, of which 40.8% had children under the age of 18 living with them, 58.5% were married couples living together, 9.3% had a female householder with no husband present, 4.5% had a male householder with no wife present, and 27.6% were non-families. 21.8% of all households were made up of individuals, and 9.2% had someone living alone who was 65 years of age or older. The average household size was 2.75 and the average family size was 3.21.

The median age in the city was 36.5 years. 27.5% of residents were under the age of 18; 7.2% were between the ages of 18 and 24; 28.6% were from 25 to 44; 27.3% were from 45 to 64; and 9.2% were 65 years of age or older. The gender makeup of the city was 49.6% male and 50.4% female.

=== 2000 census ===
As of the census of 2000, there were 1,605 people, 594 households, and 422 families living in the city. The population density was 2,044.7 inhabitants per square mile (789.5/km^{2}). There were 633 housing units at an average density of 806.4 per square mile (311.4/km^{2}). The racial makeup of the city was 90.78% White, 1.87% Asian, 1.68% Native American, 0.12% African American, 0.12% Pacific Islander, 2.74% from other races, and 2.68% from two or more races. Hispanic or Latino of any race were 7.10% of the population. On a percentage basis, North Plains is among the top 100 locations (with at least 500 residents) home to Panamanian Americans.

There were 594 households, out of which 40.9% had children under the age of 18 living with them, 58.8% were married couples living together, 8.8% had a female householder with no husband present, and 28.8% were non-families. 25.6% of all households were made up of individuals, and 12.1% had someone living alone who was 65 years of age or older. The average household size was 2.70 and the average family size was 3.24.

In the city, the population was spread out, with 30.0% under the age of 18, 5.6% from 18 to 24, 35.0% from 25 to 44, 18.8% from 45 to 64, and 10.7% who were 65 years of age or older. The median age was 34 years. For every 100 females, there were 97.7 males. For every 100 females age 18 and over, there were 92.3 males.

The median income for a household in the city was $49,563, and the median income for a family was $55,156. Males had a median income of $42,237 versus $27,857 for females. The per capita income for the city was $18,794. About 4.8% of families and 5.3% of the population were below the poverty line, including 3.8% of those under age 18 and 15.8% of those age 65 or over.

Presidential election results
Year	DEM	GOP	Others
2020	52.1% 1,006	44.3% 855	3.6% 69
2016	40.9% 559	44.0% 602	15.1% 207
2012	48.3% 457	47.4% 449	4.3% 41
2008	52.1% 503	43.5% 420	4.5% 43
2004	44.4% 362	54.2% 442	1.3% 11
2000	49.0% 329	45.6% 309	5.1% 34

== Politics ==
Politically, North Plains is competitive. Precinct 330, which comprises the entirety of the city, voted 52% to 44% for Democrat Joe Biden over Republican Donald Trump in the 2020 election, after voting for Trump over Hillary Clinton 44% to 41% in 2016.

== See also ==
- Washington County Fire District 2
