= 2013 U.S. Women's Open =

Coordinates: 40.911°N 72.455°W

Tournament information
- Dates: June 27–30, 2013
- Location: Southampton, New York
- Course: Sebonack Golf Club
- Organized by: USGA
- Tour: LPGA Tour

Statistics
- Par: 72
- Length: 6,821 yards (6,237 m)
- Field: 156 players, 68 after cut
- Cut: 150 (+6)
- Prize fund: $3.25 million
- Winner's share: $585,000

Champion
- (South Korea) Inbee Park
- 280 (−8)

Location in the United States
Location in New York

The 2013 U.S. Women's Open was the 68th U.S. Women's Open, held June 27–30 at Sebonack Golf Club in Southampton, New York. It was first time the championship was played on Long Island and marked a return to the greater New York City area, which last hosted the U.S. Women's Open in 1987. Inbee Park won her second U.S. Women's Open title, four strokes ahead of runner-up I.K. Kim. It was Park's fourth major title and third consecutive in 2013. She is the first to win the opening three majors of a season since Babe Zaharias in 1950. The event was televised by ESPN and NBC Sports.

The U.S. Women's Open is the oldest of the five current major championships and was the third of the 2013 season. Along with The Evian Championship, it had the largest purse in women's golf in 2013, at $3.25 million. It is one of 16 individual or team championships conducted by the United States Golf Association (USGA).

== Qualifying and field ==
The championship was open to any female professional or amateur golfer with a USGA handicap index not exceeding 4.4. Players qualified by competing in one of twenty 36-hole qualifying tournaments that were held between May 7 and May 30 at sites across the United States. Additional players were exempt from qualifying because of past performances in professional or amateur tournaments around the world.

A record 1,420 entries were received for the championship, surpassing the previous record of 1,364 in 2012.

=== Exempt from qualifying ===
Many players were exempt in multiple categories. Players are listed only once, in the first category in which they became exempt, with additional categories in parentheses ( ) next to their names. Golfers qualifying in Category 12 who qualify by more than one method are also denoted with the tour by which they qualified.

1. Winners of the U.S. Women's Open for the last ten years (2003–2012)
Birdie Kim, Cristie Kerr (4,8,9,11,13,14), Inbee Park (5,7,8,9,10,11,13,14), Eun-Hee Ji (9), Paula Creamer (8,9,13,14), So Yeon Ryu (9,10,11,13,14), Na Yeon Choi (8,9,10,11,13,14)

- Exempt but did not enter tournament: Hilary Lunke, Meg Mallon, Annika Sörenstam

2. Winner and runner-up from the 2012 U.S. Women's Amateur (must be an amateur)
Lydia Ko (4,11,13,14) (winner). The runner-up, Jaye Marie Green, turned professional in August 2012 and was no longer exempt from qualifying. She attempted, and failed, to qualify at the Heathrow, Florida qualifying tournament on May 28.

3. Winner of the 2013 British Ladies Amateur (must be an amateur)
Georgia Hall (declined to participate)

4. Winner of the 2012 Mark H. McCormack Medal (Women's World Amateur Golf Ranking) (must be an amateur)
The winner, Lydia Ko, is already qualified in Category 2.

5. Winners of the LPGA Championship for the last five years (2009–2013)
Anna Nordqvist (9,14), Yani Tseng (6,7,9,10,13,14), Shanshan Feng (8,9, 12-LET,13,14)

6. Winners of the Ricoh Women's British Open for the last five years (2008–2012)
Jiyai Shin (9,10,11,13,14), Catriona Matthew (9,13,14)

7. Winners of the Kraft Nabisco Championship for the last five years (2009–2013)
Brittany Lincicome (9,13), Stacy Lewis (9,10,11,13,14), Sun Young Yoo (9)

8. Ten lowest scorers and anyone tying for 10th place from the 2012 U.S. Women's Open Championship
Amy Yang (9,13,14), Sandra Gal (9), Ilhee Lee (9,11), Giulia Sergas (9), Mika Miyazato (9,11,13,14), Se Ri Pak (9), Suzann Pettersen (9,10,11,13.14), Nicole Castrale (9)

9. Top 70 money leaders from the 2012 final official LPGA money list
Ai Miyazato (13,14), Azahara Muñoz (13,14), Karrie Webb (11,13,14), Angela Stanford (13,14), Chella Choi, Lexi Thompson (13), Hee Kyung Seo, Brittany Lang, I.K. Kim (10,13,14), Karine Icher (14), Candie Kung, Haeji Kang, Jenny Shin, Julieta Granada (12-LET), Beatriz Recari (10,11,14), Hee Young Park, Vicky Hurst, Katherine Hull-Kirk, Meena Lee, Jessica Korda, Natalie Gulbis, Karin Sjödin (withdrew), Mina Harigae, Morgan Pressel, Hee-Won Han, Katie Futcher, Gerina Piller, Lindsey Wright, Jennifer Johnson (11), Lizette Salas (10,13,14), Danielle Kang, Cindy LaCrosse, Pornanong Phatlum, Jodi Ewart Shadoff, Caroline Hedwall, Momoko Ueda, Mi Jung Hur, Mariajo Uribe, Alison Walshe, Sydnee Michaels, Mo Martin, Michelle Wie, Sophie Gustafson, Dewi Claire Schreefel, Sarah Jane Smith, Belén Mozo, Jimin Kang (withdrew), Pernilla Lindberg

10. Top 10 money leaders from the 2013 official LPGA money list, through the close of entries on May 1.
All players already qualified in other categories.

11. Winners of LPGA co-sponsored events, whose victories are considered official, from the conclusion of the 2012 U.S. Women's Open Championship to the initiation of the 2013 U.S. Women's Open Championship
All players already qualified in other categories.

12. Top five money leaders from the 2012 Japan LPGA Tour, Korea LPGA Tour and Ladies European Tour

- Japan LPGA Tour: Jeon Mi-jeong (13,14) (declined to participate), Bo-Mee Lee (declined to participate), Chie Arimura, Sun-Ju Ahn (13) (declined to participate), Miki Saiki
- Korea LPGA Tour: Heo Yoon-kyung, Kim Ha-Neul, Char Young Kim, Yang Je-yoon, Yang Soo-jin
- Ladies European Tour: Carlota Ciganda, Caroline Masson, Carly Booth

13. Top 25 point leaders from the current Rolex Rankings and anyone tying for 25th place as of May 1, 2013
Ariya Jutanugarn (13,14) (withdrew from tournament on June 25)

14. Top 25 point leaders from the current Rolex Rankings and anyone tying for 25th place as of June 24, 2013
All players already qualified in other categories.

15. Special exemptions selected by the USGA
Juli Inkster

=== Qualifiers ===
Additional players qualified for the 2013 U.S. Women's Open through one of the sectional qualifying tournaments. At sites with multiple qualifiers, players are listed in order of qualifying scores, from lowest score to highest.

May 7 at The Eldridge Club, Baltimore, Maryland
Christina Kim, Irene Cho, Thidapa Suwannapura, Maude-Aimee Leblanc, Taylore Karle, Nicole Jeray, Felicity Johnson, Paz Echeverria, Tiffany Joh, Janice Moodie, Stephanie Sherlock

May 13 at Druid Hills Golf Club, Atlanta, Georgia
Jane Park, Macarena Silva, Laura Diaz, Austin Ernst, Amelia Lewis, Kristy McPherson, Jennifer Rosales, Kris Tamulis

May 13 at Mount Pleasant Country Club, Boylston, Massachusetts
Becky Morgan

May 13 at Butler Country Club, Butler, Pennsylvania
Erica Herr (a), Rachel Rohanna

May 14 at Cantigny Golf, Wheaton, Illinois
Caroline Powers (a), Chelsea Harris

May 15 at Oak Valley Golf Club, Beaumont, California
Tiffany Lua (a), Gabriella Then (a), Stacey Keating

May 20 at Arrowhead Country Club, Glendale, Arizona
Alexandra Kaui (a), Elena Robles

May 20 at Lake Merced Golf Club, Daly City, California
Casie Cathrea (a), Emily Childs, Elizabeth Schultz (a)

May 20 at Waialae Country Club, Honolulu, Hawaii
Mariel Galdiano (a)

May 20 at Waverley Country Club, Portland, Oregon
Karinn Dickinson (a), Kelli Bowers (a)

May 21 at The Woodlands Country Club, The Woodlands, Texas
Katy Harris, Jessica Shepley, Christi Cano

May 28 at Industry Hills Golf Club, City of Industry, California
Mariah Stackhouse (a), Alice Kim, Aimee Cho (a)

May 28 at Heathrow Country Club, Heathrow, Florida
Lorie Kane, Yueer Feng (a), Caroline Westrup, Doris Chen (a)

May 28 at Minneapolis Golf Club, St. Louis Park, Minnesota
Ayako Uehara, Kirby Dreher

May 29 at Broadmoor Golf Club, Colorado Springs, Colorado
Nicole Zhang (a), Sally Watson

May 29 at Bear Lakes Country Club, West Palm Beach, Florida
Nelly Korda (a), Shannon Aubert (a), Emily Tubert (a), Jackie Barenborg Stoelting

May 30 at Algonquin Golf Club, St. Louis, Missouri
Izzy Beisiegel, Megan Grehan

May 30 at Carolina Trace Country Club, Sanford, North Carolina
Patcharajutar Kongkraphan, Tiffany Tavee, Christine Song

May 30 at Edgewood Country Club, River Vale, New Jersey
Brooke Henderson (a), Annie Park (a), Kendra Little

May 30 at Bent Tree Country Club, Dallas, Texas
Jamie Hullett, Catherine Matranga, Kyung Kim (a)

(a) denotes amateur

=== Alternates added to field ===
The following players were added to the field on June 10 when spots reserved for players qualifying in various categories, including 5, 10, 12, and 13, were not used.

- Moira Dunn, the first alternate from the Heathrow, Florida qualifier
- Ji Young Oh, the first alternate from the Baltimore qualifier
- Brooke Pancake, the first alternate from the Atlanta qualifier
- Karen Stupples, the second alternate from the Atlanta qualifier

Danah Bordner, the second alternate from the Baltimore qualifier, was added to the field on June 12 when Jimin Kang, who qualified in category 9, withdrew from the tournament.

Ryann O'Toole, the first alternate from the Boylston, Massachusetts qualifier, was added to the field on June 24 when Karin Sjödin who qualified in category 9, withdrew from the tournament citing a shoulder injury.

Christel Boeljon, the first alternate from the River Vale, New Jersey qualifier, was added to the field on June 24 when the space reserved for the winner of the Walmart NW Arkansas Championship was not used because the winner, Inbee Park, had already qualified in multiple categories.

Amy Meier, the first alternate from the St. Louis qualifier, Lindy Duncan, the first alternate from the West Palm Beach, Florida qualifier, and Mikayla Harmon, an amateur and the first alternate from the Glendale Arizona qualifier, were added to the field when Jeon Mi-jeong, Bo-Mee Lee, and Sun-Ju Ahn, who all qualified in category 12, declined to participate in the tournament.

Hannah Suh, an amateur and the first alternate from the Daly City, California qualifier, was added to the field on June 25 when Ariya Jutanugarn, who qualified in category 13, withdrew with a shoulder injury.

== Course layout ==
Hole	1	2	3	4	5	6	7	8	9	Out	10	11	12	13	14	15	16	17	18	In	Total
Yards	396	421	205	341	381	423	167	500	334	3,168	380	434	161	549	428	574	403	176	548	3,653	6,821
Par	4	4	3	4	4	4	3	5	4	35	4	4	3	5	4	5	4	3	5	37	72

The front nine was slightly altered for the championship, starting at the members' second hole and concluding at the first. The back nine was unchanged.

== Round summaries ==
=== First round ===
Thursday, June 27, 2013

Kim Ha-Neul shot a bogey-free 6-under-par 66 to lead by one stroke over Inbee Park. Park won the first two majors of the 2013 season, only Babe Zaharias in 1950 has won the first three majors in a season. Defending champion Na Yeon Choi shot 71 to tie for 17th.

Place	Player	Score	To par
1	(South Korea) Kim Ha-Neul	66	−6
2	(South Korea) Inbee Park	67	−5
T3	(Sweden) Caroline Hedwall	68	−4
T3	(South Korea) I.K. Kim	68	−4
T3	(Sweden) Anna Nordqvist	68	−4
T3	(United States) Lizette Salas	68	−4
T7	(Chile) Paz Echeverria	69	−3
T7	(Canada) Maude-Aimee Leblanc	69	−3
T9	(England) Jodi Ewart Shadoff	70	−2
T9	(United States) Natalie Gulbis	70	−2
T9	(France) Karine Icher	70	−2
T9	(United States) Jessica Korda	70	−2
T9	(Scotland) Catriona Matthew	70	−2
T9	(Philippines) Jennifer Rosales	70	−2
T9	(Colombia) Mariajo Uribe	70	−2
T9	(South Korea) Yang Je-yoon	70	−2

=== Second round ===
Friday, June 28, 2013
Saturday, June 29, 2013

The second round was interrupted by fog on Friday afternoon with only 114 players completing their second rounds. Inbee Park, in the last group to finish Friday, was the clubhouse leader at 9-under-par.

Place	Player	Score	To par
1	(South Korea) Inbee Park	67-68=135	−9
2	(South Korea) I.K. Kim	68-69=137	−7
3	(England) Jodi Ewart Shadoff	70-69=139	−5
4	(United States) Lizette Salas	68-72=140	−4
T5	(United States) Jessica Korda	70-71=141	−3
T5	(United States) Angela Stanford	73-68=141	−3
T7	(France) Karine Icher	70-72=142	−2
T7	(Sweden) Anna Nordqvist	68-74=142	−2
T7	(South Korea) So Yeon Ryu	73-69=142	−2
T10	(Sweden) Caroline Hedwall	68-75=143	−1
T10	(South Korea) Kim Ha-Neul	66-77=143	−1

=== Third round ===
Saturday, June 29, 2013

Place	Player	Score	To par
1	(South Korea) Inbee Park	67-68-71=206	−10
2	(South Korea) I.K. Kim	68-69-73=210	−6
3	(England) Jodi Ewart Shadoff	70-69-74=213	−3
T4	(South Korea) So Yeon Ryu	73-69-73=215	−1
T4	(United States) Angela Stanford	73-68-74=215	−1
T6	(United States) Paula Creamer	72-73-72=217	+1
T6	(United States) Jessica Korda	70-71-76=217	+1
T8	(United States) Cristie Kerr	72-72-74=218	+2
T8	(United States) Brittany Lang	76-69-73=218	+2
T8	(United States) Brittany Lincicome	72-72-74=218	+2
T8	(Japan) Ai Miyazato	76-70-72=218	+2

=== Final round ===
Sunday, June 30, 2013

Place	Player	Score	To par	Money ($)
1	(South Korea) Inbee Park	67-68-71-74=280	−8	585,000
2	(South Korea) I.K. Kim	68-69-73-74=284	−4	350,000
3	(South Korea) So Yeon Ryu	73-69-73-72=287	−1	217,958
T4	(United States) Paula Creamer	72-73-72-72=289	+1	127,972
T4	(England) Jodi Ewart Shadoff	70-69-74-76=289	+1	127,972
T4	(United States) Angela Stanford	73-68-74-74=289	+1	127,972
T7	(United States) Jessica Korda	70-71-76-73=290	+2	94,357
T7	(United States) Brittany Lang	76-69-73-72=290	+2	94,357
T9	(China) Shanshan Feng	71-75-75-70=291	+3	79,711
T9	(United States) Brittany Lincicome	72-72-74-73=291	+3	79,711

==== Scorecard ====
Final round

Hole	1	2	3	4	5	6	7	8	9	10	11	12	13	14	15	16	17	18
Par	4	4	3	4	4	4	3	5	4	4	4	3	5	4	5	4	3	5
(South Korea) Park	−10	−10	−10	−10	−10	−9	−8	−8	−9	−10	−10	−10	−10	−9	−8	−8	−8	−8
(South Korea) Kim	−6	−7	−7	−6	−6	−5	−4	−4	−4	−4	−4	−4	−4	−4	−4	−4	−4	−4

Cumulative tournament scores, relative to par
