= TPC Scottsdale =

36-hole golf complex located in Scottsdale, Arizona

- Location within the United States Location within Arizona
- 33.64°N 111.91°W

Club information
- Location: 17020 North Hayden Road; Scottsdale, Arizona, U.S.
- Established: 1986, 40 years ago
- Type: Public resort
- Operator: PGA Tour TPC Network
- Total holes: 36
- Tournaments: Phoenix Open
- Website: Official website

Stadium Course
- Designed by: Tom Weiskopf, Jay Morrish
- Par: 71
- Length: 7,266 yards (6,644 m)
- Course rating: 74.7
- Slope rating: 142

Champions Course
- Designed by: Randy Heckenkemper
- Par: 71
- Length: 7,115 yards (6,506 m)
- Course rating: 73.4
- Slope rating: 137

TPC Scottsdale is a 36-hole golf complex in the southwestern United States, located in Scottsdale, Arizona, northeast of Phoenix.

Opened in 1986, the resort is part of the Tournament Players Club network of golf courses operated by the PGA Tour. The Stadium Course has been home to the tour's annual Phoenix Open since 1987.

== Stadium Course ==
Tom Weiskopf and Jay Morrish were commissioned by the PGA Tour to build a course to host the Phoenix Open starting in 1987. The Stadium Course was the result, at an approximate average elevation of 1,530 feet (470 m) above sea level.

The par-3 16th hole on the Stadium Course is the only fully enclosed hole on the PGA Tour. The temporary grandstands used for the Phoenix Open, that surround the 16th, which have a capacity of 20,000, are home to one of the most enthusiastic crowds on the PGA Tour. A shot that lands on the green will generally result in cheers from the crowd, while a shot that misses the green will usually result in boos. Tiger Woods scored an ace (hole in one) on this hole during the 1997 Phoenix Open, sending the crowd in attendance into a frenzy. A hole-in-one has been made on the 16th hole by 11 other golfers in the history of the Phoenix Open, with Emiliano Grillo being the most recent to do so in 2025.

=== Grass Types ===
The TPC Scottsdale golf course utilizes a variety of grass types to maintain playing conditions:

- Fairways: TifDwarf Grass
- Greens: TifDwarf Grass

=== Scorecard ===
TPC Scottsdale – Stadium Course
Tee	Rating/Slope	1	2	3	4	5	6	7	8	9	Out	10	11	12	13	14	15	16	17	18	In	Total
Black	74.7 / 142	403	442	558	183	470	432	215	475	453	3631	428	472	192	558	490	553	163	332	442	3630	7261
Blue	71.5 / 131	355	410	530	157	417	386	188	445	405	3293	402	446	170	508	461	498	140	294	402	3321	6614
White	68.4 / 123	339	386	510	141	373	348	164	418	381	3060	373	416	149	482	426	459	119	255	371	3050	6110
Red	70.8 / 122	314	357	470	114	350	316	138	322	334	2715	342	379	122	454	401	407	98	228	318	2749	5464
Par		4	4	5	3	4	4	3	4	4	35	4	4	3	5	4	5	3	4	4	36	71
SI		14	8	4	18	6	12	16	2	10		11	1	15	5	7	9	17	13	3

== Champions Course ==
The second course at TPC Scottsdale is the Champions Course, which was designed by Randy Heckenkemper, and completed in 2007. This course replaced the original Weiskopf and Morrish designed Desert Course.

=== Scorecard ===
TPC Scottsdale – Champions Course
Tee	Rating/Slope	1	2	3	4	5	6	7	8	9	Out	10	11	12	13	14	15	16	17	18	In	Total
Black	73.4 / 137	371	461	174	556	477	202	393	212	575	3421	542	474	446	164	429	359	215	605	460	3694	7115
Blue	71.1 / 131	338	428	144	521	442	188	383	191	532	3167	514	456	423	148	410	334	189	583	429	3486	6653
White	68.5 / 120	323	373	134	495	385	145	355	166	516	2892	484	433	395	117	399	313	157	552	385	3235	6127
Red	69.8 / 120	278	325	113	459	289	121	313	137	451	2486	464	384	353	106	350	289	118	462	330	2856	5342
Par		4	4	3	5	4	3	4	3	5	35	5	4	4	3	4	4	3	5	4	36	71
SI		16	8	18	6	2	12	14	10	4		11	7	5	17	13	15	9	3	1
