= 2014 Texas Wild season =

- Conference: 4th Western

Record
- 2014 record: 6 wins, 8 losses
- Home record: 2 wins, 5 losses
- Road record: 4 wins, 3 losses
- Games won–lost: 263–274

Team info
- Owner(s): Jeff Launius; Mel Launius
- General manager: Jeff Launius
- Coach: Brent Haygarth
- Stadium: Four Seasons Resort and Club Dallas at Las Colinas (capacity: 2,000)

The 2014 Texas Wild season was the 22nd season of the franchise in World TeamTennis (WTT) and its second and final season in Texas.

The Wild had 6 wins and 8 losses and finished last in the Western Conference. It failed to qualify for the playoffs.

On February 23, 2015, WTT announced that a new ownership group had taken control of the Wild and moved the team to Citrus Heights, California, renaming it the California Dream.

== Season recap ==
=== Bryan Brothers traded ===
On January 23, 2014, the Wild traded Bob and Mike Bryan to the San Diego Aviators in exchange for undisclosed financial consideration.

=== Drafts ===
Since the Wild had the better record of the two conference championship match losers in 2013 at 9 wins and 5 losses, it had the third-to-last (sixth) selection in each round of the WTT Marquee Player Draft and moved up to fifth in the Roster Player Draft after the contraction of the Las Vegas Neon. The Wild passed on making any selections at the marquee player draft. The Wild protected Aisam Qureshi, Alex Bogomolov, Jr. and Darija Jurak and drafted Anabel Medina Garrigues in the roster player draft.

=== Free agent player signings ===
On July 16, 2014, the Wild signed Tim Smyczek as a substitute player.

=== Early season success ===
The Wild opened its season with a road victory against the Boston Lobsters on July 6, 2014. It won the first four sets of the match to take a 20–9 lead. The Wild was led by Anabel Medina Garrigues who won the women's singles set and paired with Darija Jurak to take the women's doubles and with Aisam Qureshi to win the mixed doubles. Alex Bogomolov, Jr. got the Wid started with a set win in men's singles. The Lobsters won the final set of men's doubles to send the match to overtime. But Bogomolov and Qureshi won the first game of overtime to seal a 23–14 victory.

The following night, the Wild visited the Springfield Lasers in a rematch of the 2013 Western Conference Championship Match. After the Wild won the first two sets to take a 10–4 lead, the Lasers cut the deficit at halftime to 10–9 by sweeping five straight games of mixed doubles. Medina Garrigues won the women's singles set, 5–2, to extend the Wild's lead to 15–11. But the Lasers took the fifth set of men's singles, 5–1, to tie the match at 16 and send it to a super tiebreaker. After struggling in the final set, Bogomolov was able to redeem himself by taking the tiebreaker, 7–5, to secure a 17–16 victory.

The Wild met the three-time defending WTT Champion Washington Kastles in its home opener on July 8, 2014. The Wild won only one of the five sets in a 24–15 loss.

The Wild won another thrilling road match on July 10, 2014, against the San Diego Aviators. Trailing 18–14 after four sets, Bogomolov and Qureshi took the men's doubles set, 5–1, to tie the match at 19 and send it to a super tiebreaker which they won, 7–6, on a match-deciding point to secure a 20–19 victory.

The following night, the Wild returned home to meet the Philadelphia Freedoms. It found itself behind again, 18–16, after four sets. Once again, Bogomolov and Qureshi produced a dramatic comeback. They won the final set of men's doubles, 5–3, to tie the match at 21 and send it to a super tiebreaker. Bogomolov and Qureshi dominated the tiebreaker, 7–1, to give the Wild a 22–21 victory and a record of 4 wins and 1 loss.

=== Mid-season struggle ===
After starting the season strong, the Wild lost four of its next five matches to drop its record to 5 wins and 5 losses. The run started with a road loss against the Springfield Lasers. Alex Bogomolov, Jr. won the fifth set of men's singles to tie the match at 18. But the Lasers won the super tiebreaker, 7–6, on a match-deciding point to earn a 19–18 victory.

The struggling Wild hosted the Austin Aces on July 17, 2014, in the first-ever match between the in-state rivals after the Aces moved to Greater Austin from Orange County, California. The Wild had an 18–16 lead after four sets. The Aces won the final set of mixed doubles, 5–4, to force overtime and then won an overtime game to tie the match at 22. The Aces took the tiebreaker, 7–4, to earn a 23–22 victory.

=== Late season collapse ===
After losing to the Aces at home the previous night, the Wild traveled to Cedar Park for a rematch on July 18, 2014. The Wild won four of the five sets in a dominant 23–12 victory. Anabel Medina Garrigues closed out the match with a set win in women's singles after earlier recording set wins in mixed doubles with Aisam Qureshi and in women's doubles with Darija Jurak. Alex Bogomolov, Jr. got the Wild started with a win in the opening set of men's singles. The win gave the Wild 6 wins and 5 losses and control over its playoff destiny. At the point, the San Diego Aviators led the conference with 6 wins and 4 losses, the Springfield Lasers were third at 5 wins and 5 losses, ½ match behind the Wild, and the Aces had 4 wins and 6 losses.

The following evening, the Wild lost a critical match at home to the Lasers to drop to third place in the standings. The Wild dropped all five sets in the 25–16 defeat.

In what would prove to be the final home match for the franchise in Irving, the Wild dropped four of the five sets in falling to the Aces, 22–16.

In the final match for the franchise as the Texas Wild, the team dropped four of the five sets in a 22–13 road loss to the Aviators.

Despite closing the season with three straight defeats and finishing with a losing record at 6 wins and 8 losses, the Wild remained mathematically alive in the playoff race on the season's final day. It needed losses by both the Lasers and the Aces to create a three-way tie for second place in the Western Conference. For the Wild to win the standings tiebreaker, the Lasers had to win 17 or fewer games in their final match. Once the Lasers took a 17–3 lead on their way to a 25–7 victory over the Boston Lobsters, the Wild's season came to an end.

=== Move to California ===
On February 23, 2015, WTT announced that a new ownership group had taken control of the Wild and moved the team to Citrus Heights, California, renaming it the California Dream.

== Event chronology ==
- January 23, 2014: The Wild traded Bob and Mike Bryan to the San Diego Aviators in exchange for undisclosed financial consideration.
- March 11, 2014: The Wild protected Aisam Qureshi, Alex Bogomolov, Jr. and Darija Jurak and drafted Anabel Medina Garrigues in the WTT Roster Player Draft.
- July 16, 2014: The Wild signed Tim Smyczek as a substitute player.
- July 20, 2014: The Wild lost its final home match in Irving to the Austin Aces, 22–16.
- July 22, 2014: The franchise lost its final match as the Texas Wild to the San Diego Aviators, 22–13.
- July 23, 2014: With a record of 6 wins and 8 losses, the Wild was eliminated from playoff contention when the Springfield Lasers defeated the Boston Lobsters, 25–7.
- February 23, 2015: WTT announced that a new ownership group had taken control of the Wild and moved the team to Citrus Heights, California, renaming it the California Dream.

== Draft picks ==
Since the Wild had the better record of the two conference championship match losers in 2013 at 9 wins and 5 losses, it had the third-to-last (sixth) selection in each round of the WTT Marquee Player Draft and moved up to fifth in the Roster Player Draft after the contraction of the Las Vegas Neon.

=== Marquee player draft ===
The Wild passed on making any selections at the WTT Marquee Player Draft.

Round	No.	Overall	Player chosen	Prot?
1	6	6	Pass	–
2	6	14	Pass	–

=== Roster player draft ===
The Wild protected Aisam Qureshi, Alex Bogomolov, Jr. and Darija Jurak and drafted Anabel Medina Garrigues in the WTT Roster Player Draft. The selections made by the Wild are shown in the table below.

Round	No.	Overall	Player chosen	Prot?
1	5	5	Anabel Medina Garrigues	N
2	5	12	Aisam Qureshi	Y
3	5	19	Alex Bogomolov, Jr.	Y
4	5	26	Darija Jurak	Y

== Match log ==
Legend
Wild Win	Wild Loss
Home team in CAPS

Match	Date	Venue and location	Result and details	Record
1	July 6	Boston Lobsters Tennis Center at the Manchester Athletic Club; Manchester-by-the-Sea, Massachusetts	Texas Wild 23, BOSTON LOBSTERS 14 (overtime) * MS: Alex Bogomolov, Jr. (Wild) 5, Rik de Voest (Lobsters) 2 * WD: Darija Jurak/Anabel Medina Garrigues (Wild) 5, Sharon Fichman/Megan Moulton-Levy (Lobsters) 4 * XD: Anabel Medina Garrigues/Aisam Qureshi (Wild) 5, Megan Moulton-Levy/Eric Butorac (Lobsters) 2 * WS: Anabel Medina Garrigues (Wild) 5, Megan Moulton-Levy (Lobsters) 1 *** Megan Moulton-Levy substituted for Sharon Fichman at 0–1 * MD: Eric Butorac/Rik de Voest (Lobsters) 5, Alex Bogomolov, Jr./Aisam Qureshi (Wild) 2 * OT – MD: Alex Bogomolov, Jr./Aisam Qureshi (Wild) 1, Eric Butorac/Rik de Voest (Lobsters) 0	1–0
2	July 7	Mediacom Stadium at Cooper Tennis Complex; Springfield, Missouri	Texas Wild 17, SPRINGFIELD LASERS 16 (super tiebreaker, 7–5) * MD: Alex Bogomolov, Jr./Aisam Qureshi (Wild) 5, Ross Hutchins/Michael Russell (Lasers) 2 * WD: Darija Jurak/Anabel Medina Garrigues (Wild) 5, Olga Govortsova/Anna-Lena Grönefeld (Lasers) 2 * XD: Olga Govortsova/Ross Hutchins (Lasers) 5, Anabel Medina Garrigues/Aisam Qureshi (Wild) 0 * WS: Anabel Medina Garrigues (Wild) 5, Olga Govortsova (Lasers) 2 * MS: Michael Russell (Lasers) 5, Alex Bogomolov, Jr. (Wild) 1 * STB - MS: Alex Bogomolov, Jr. (Wild) 7, Michael Russell (Lasers) 5	2–0
3	July 8	Four Seasons Resort and Club Dallas at Las Colinas; Irving, Texas	Washington Kastles 24, TEXAS WILD 15 * MS: Bobby Reynolds (Kastles) 5, Alex Bogomolov, Jr. (Wild) 2 * WS: Anabel Medina Garrigues (Wild) 5, Jarmila Gajdošová (Kastles) 4 * XD: Jarmila Gajdošová/Leander Paes (Kastles) 5, Anabel Medina Garrigues/Aisam Qureshi (Wild) 4 * WD: Jarmila Gajdošová/Anastasia Rodionova (Kastles) 5, Darija Jurak/Anabel Medina Garrigues (Wild) 1 * MD: Leander Paes/Bobby Reynolds (Kastles) 5, Alex Bogomolov, Jr./Aisam Qureshi (Wild) 3	2–1
4	July 10	Valley View Casino Center; San Diego, California	Texas Wild 20, SAN DIEGO AVIATORS 19 (super tiebreaker, 7–6) * MS: Alex Bogomolov, Jr. (Wild) 5, Somdev Devvarman (Aviators) 3 * WS: Daniela Hantuchová (Aviators) 5, Anabel Medina Garrigues (Wild) 2 * XD: Květa Peschke/Raven Klaasen (Aviators) 5, Anabel Medina Garrigues/Aisam Qureshi (Wild) 4 * WD: Daniela Hantuchová/Květa Peschke (Aviators) 5, Darija Jurak/Anabel Medina Garrigues (Wild) 3 * MD: Alex Bogomolov, Jr./Aisam Qureshi (Wild) 5, Somdev Devvarman/Raven Klaasen (Aviators) 1 * STB – MD: Alex Bogomolov, Jr./Aisam Qureshi (Wild) 7, Somdev Devvarman/Raven Klaasen (Aviators) 6	3–1
5	July 11	Four Seasons Resort and Club Dallas at Las Colinas; Irving, Texas	TEXAS WILD 22, Philadelphia Freedoms 21 (super tiebreaker, 7–1) * XD: Liezel Huber/Marcelo Melo (Freedoms) 5, Anabel Medina Garrigues/Aisam Qureshi (Wild) 3 * MS: Alex Bogomolov, Jr. (Wild) 5, Frank Dancevic (Freedoms) 4 * WD: Darija Jurak/Anabel Medina Garrigues (Wild) 5, Liezel Huber/Taylor Townsend (Freedoms) 4 * WS: Taylor Townsend (Freedoms) 5, Anabel Medina Garrigues (Wild) 3 * MD: Alex Bogomolov, Jr./Aisam Qureshi (Wild) 5, Frank Dancevic/Marcelo Melo (Freedoms) 3 * STB – MD: Alex Bogomolov, Jr./Aisam Qureshi (Wild) 7, Frank Dancevic/Marcelo Melo (Freedoms) 1	4–1
6	July 12	Mediacom Stadium at Cooper Tennis Complex; Springfield, Missouri	SPRINGFIELD LASERS 19, Texas Wild 18 (super tiebreaker, 7–6) * MD: Alex Bogomolov, Jr./Aisam Qureshi (Wild) 5, James Blake/Michael Russell (Lasers) 2 * WS: Anabel Medina Garrigues (Wild) 5, Olga Govortsova (Lasers) 3 * XD: Olga Govortsova/James Blake (Lasers) 5, Darija Jurak/Aisam Qureshi (Wild) 2 * WD: Līga Dekmeijere/Olga Govortsova (Lasers) 5, Darija Jurak/Anabel Medina Garrigues (Wild) 1 * MS: Alex Bogomolov, Jr. (Wild) 5, Michael Russell (Lasers) 3 * STB - MS: Michael Russell (Lasers) 7, Alex Bogomolov, Jr. (Wild) 6	4–2
7	July 13	Four Seasons Resort and Club Dallas at Las Colinas; Irving, Texas	San Diego Aviators 21, TEXAS WILD 18 * XD: Anabel Medina Garrigues/Aisam Qureshi (Wild) 5, Květa Peschke/Raven Klaasen (Aviators) 3 * WD: Darija Jurak/Anabel Medina Garrigues (Wild) 5, Daniela Hantuchová/Květa Peschke (Aviators) 3 * MS: Somdev Devvarman (Aviators) 5, Aisam Qureshi (Wild) 3 *** Aisam Qureshi substituted for Alex Bogomolov, Jr. at 3–3 * WS: Daniela Hantuchová (Aviators) 5, Anabel Medina Garrigues (Wild) 1 * MD: Somdev Devvarman/Raven Klaasen (Aviators) 5, Alex Bogomolov, Jr./Aisam Qureshi (Wild) 4	4–3
8	July 15	Four Seasons Resort and Club Dallas at Las Colinas; Irving, Texas	TEXAS WILD 22, Springfield Lasers 13 * XD: Darija Jurak/Aisam Qureshi (Wild) 5, Olga Govortsova/Ross Hutchins (Lasers) 2 * WD: Darija Jurak/Anabel Medina Garrigues (Wild) 5, Olga Govortsova/Raquel Kops-Jones (Lasers) 3 * MS: Michael Russell (Lasers) 5, Alex Bogomolov, Jr. (Wild) 2 * WS: Anabel Medina Garrigues (Wild) 5, Olga Govortsova (Lasers) 1 * MD: Alex Bogomolov, Jr./Aisam Qureshi (Wild) 5, Ross Hutchins/Michael Russell (Lasers) 2	5–3
9	July 16	Kastles Stadium at the Charles E. Smith Center; Washington, District of Columbia	WASHINGTON KASTLES 23, Texas Wild 18 * MS: Bobby Reynolds (Kastles) 5, Tim Smyczek (Wild) 4 * WD: Martina Hingis/Venus Williams (Kastles) 5, Anabel Medina Garrigues/Darija Jurak (Wild) 2 * XD: Anabel Medina Garrigues/Aisam Qureshi (Wild) 5, Martina Hingis/Leander Paes (Kastles) 4; ***Anabel Medina Garrigues substituted for Darija Jurak at 1–2 * WS: Anabel Medina Garrigues (Wild) 5, Venus Williams (Kastles) 4 * MD: Bobby Reynolds/Leander Paes (Kastles) 5, Aisam Qureshi/Tim Smyczek (Wild) 2	5–4
10	July 17	Four Seasons Resort and Club Dallas at Las Colinas; Irving, Texas	Austin Aces 23, TEXAS WILD 22 (super tiebreaker, 7–4) * MS: John-Patrick Smith (Aces) 5, Alex Bogomolov, Jr. (Wild) 4 * WD: Eva Hrdinová/Vera Zvonareva (Aces) 5, Darija Jurak/Anabel Medina Garrigues (Wild) 4 * MD: Alex Bogomolov, Jr./Aisam Qureshi (Wild) 5, Treat Huey/John-Patrick Smith (Aces) 2 * WS: Anabel Medina Garrigues (Wild) 5, Vera Zvonareva (Aces) 4 * XD: Eva Hrdinová/Treat Huey (Aces) 5, Anabel Medina Garrigues/Aisam Qureshi (Wild) 4 *** Anabel Medina Garrigues substituted for Darija Jurak at 1–2 * OT – XD: Eva Hrdinová/Treat Huey (Aces) 1, Anabel Medina Garrigues/Aisam Qureshi (Wild) 0 * STB – XD: Eva Hrdinová/Treat Huey (Aces) 7, Anabel Medina Garrigues/Aisam Qureshi (Wild) 4	5–5
11	July 18	Cedar Park Center; Cedar Park, Texas	Texas Wild 23, AUSTIN ACES 12 * MS: Alex Bogomolov, Jr. (Wild) 5, Andy Roddick (Aces) 3 * MD: Treat Huey/Andy Roddick (Aces) 5, Alex Bogomolov, Jr./Aisam Qureshi (Wild) 3 * XD: Anabel Medina Garrigues/Aisam Qureshi (Wild) 5, Marion Bartoli/Treat Huey (Aces) 1 * WD: Darija Jurak/Anabel Medina Garrigues (Wild) 5, Marion Bartoli/Vera Zvonareva (Aces) 2 * WS: Anabel Medina Garrigues (Wild) 5, Vera Zvonareva (Aces) 1	6–5
12	July 19	Four Seasons Resort and Club Dallas at Las Colinas; Irving, Texas	Springfield Lasers 25, TEXAS WILD 16 * XD: Olga Govortsova/Ross Hutchins (Lasers) 5, Anabel Medina Garrigues/Aisam Qureshi (Wild) 4 * WD: Olga Govortsova/Abigail Spears (Lasers) 5, Darija Jurak/Anabel Medina Garrigues (Wild) 2 * MS: Michael Russell (Lasers) 5, Alex Bogomolov, Jr. (Wild) 2 * WS: Olga Govortsova (Lasers) 5, Anabel Medina Garrigues (Wild) 4 * MD: Ross Hutchins/Michael Russell (Lasers) 5, Alex Bogomolov, Jr./Aisam Qureshi (Wild) 4	6–6
13	July 20	Four Seasons Resort and Club Dallas at Las Colinas; Irving, Texas	Austin Aces 22, TEXAS WILD 16 * XD: Eva Hrdinová/Treat Huey (Aces) 5, Anabel Medina Garrigues/Alex Bogomolov, Jr. (Wild) 3 *** Alex Bogomolov, Jr. substituted for Aisam Qureshi at 3–4 * WD: Eva Hrdinová/Vera Zvonareva (Aces) 5, Darija Jurak/Anabel Medina Garrigues (Wild) 3 * MS: Alex Bogomolov, Jr. (Wild) 5, Jesse Witten (Aces) 2 * WS: Vera Zvonareva (Aces) 5, Anabel Medina Garrigues (Wild) 2 * MD: Treat Huey/Jesse Witten (Aces) 5, Alex Bogomolov, Jr./Aisam Qureshi (Wild) 3	6–7
14	July 22	Valley View Casino Center; San Diego, California	SAN DIEGO AVIATORS 22, Texas Wild 13 * MS: Somdev Devvarman (Aviators) 5, Alex Bogomolov, Jr. (Wild) 2 * WD: Anabel Medina Garrigues/Darija Jurak (Wild) 5, Daniela Hantuchová/Květa Peschke (Aviators) 2 * XD: Mike Bryan/Květa Peschke (Aviators) 5, Aisam Qureshi/Anabel Medina Garrigues (Wild) 3 * WS: Daniela Hantuchová (Aviators) 5, Anabel Medina Garrigues (Wild) 1 * MD: Bob Bryan/Mike Bryan (Aviators) 5, Alex Bogomolov, Jr./Aisam Qureshi (Wild) 2	6–8

== Team personnel ==
=== On-court personnel ===
- (South Africa) Brent Haygarth – Head Coach
- (Russia) Alex Bogomolov, Jr.
- (Croatia) Darija Jurak
- (Spain) Anabel Medina Garrigues
- (Pakistan) Aisam Qureshi
- (United States) Tim Smyczek (Note: Player appeared in fewer than three matches during the season as a substitute player and was not eligible to be protected in the following year's draft.)

=== Front office ===
- Jeff Launius – Owner and General Manager
- Mel Launius – Owner

== Statistics ==
Players are listed in order of their game-winning percentage provided they played in at least 40% of the Wild's games in that event, which is the WTT minimum for qualification for league leaders in individual statistical categories.

Men's singles

Player	GP	GW	GL	PCT	A	DF	BPW	BPP	BP%	3APW	3APP	3AP%
Alex Bogomolov, Jr.	98	47	51	.480	4	17	15	42	.357	12	25	.480
Tim Smyczek	9	4	5	.444	3	0	2	3	.667	2	4	.500
Aisam Qureshi	2	0	2	.000	0	0	0	0	–	0	0	–
Total	109	51	58	.468	7	17	17	45	.378	14	29	.483

Women's singles

Player	GP	GW	GL	PCT	A	DF	BPW	BPP	BP%	3APW	3APP	3AP%
Anabel Medina Garrigues	103	53	50	.515	9	6	17	39	.436	11	22	.500
Total	103	53	50	.515	9	6	17	39	.436	11	22	.500

Men's doubles

Player	GP	GW	GL	PCT	A	DF	BPW	BPP	BP%	3APW	3APP	3AP%
Alex Bogomolov, Jr.	101	54	47	.535	1	7	17	37	.459	16	25	.640
Aisam Qureshi	108	56	52	.519	4	8	17	37	.459	17	27	.630
Tim Smyczek	7	2	5	.286	1	0	0	0	–	1	2	.500
Total	108	56	52	.519	6	15	17	37	.459	17	27	.630

Women's doubles

Player	GP	GW	GL	PCT	A	DF	BPW	BPP	BP%	3APW	3APP	3AP%
Darija Jurak	106	51	55	.481	2	9	20	54	.370	15	30	.500
Anabel Medina Garrigues	106	51	55	.481	3	5	20	54	.370	15	30	.500
Total	106	51	55	.481	5	14	20	54	.370	15	30	.500

Mixed doubles

Player	GP	GW	GL	PCT	A	DF	BPW	BPP	BP%	3APW	3APP	3AP%
Aisam Qureshi	110	52	58	.473	26	4	11	26	.423	9	22	.409
Anabel Medina Garrigues	93	43	50	.462	2	6	10	24	.417	9	20	.450
Darija Jurak	18	9	9	.500	0	1	1	2	.500	0	2	.000
Alex Bogomolov, Jr.	1	0	1	.000	0	0	0	0	–	0	0	–
Total	111	52	59	.468	28	11	11	26	.423	9	22	.409

Team totals

Event	GP	GW	GL	PCT	A	DF	BPW	BPP	BP%	3APW	3APP	3AP%
Men's singles	109	51	58	.468	7	17	17	45	.378	14	29	.483
Women's singles	103	53	50	.515	9	6	17	39	.436	11	22	.500
Men's doubles	108	56	52	.519	6	15	17	37	.459	17	27	.630
Women's doubles	106	51	55	.481	5	14	20	54	.370	15	30	.500
Mixed doubles	111	52	59	.468	28	11	11	26	.423	9	22	.409
Total	537	263	274	.490	55	63	82	201	.408	66	130	.508

== Transactions ==
- January 23, 2014: The Wild traded Bob and Mike Bryan to the San Diego Aviators in exchange for undisclosed financial consideration.
- March 11, 2014: The Wild protected Aisam Qureshi, Alex Bogomolov, Jr. and Darija Jurak and drafted Anabel Medina Garrigues in the WTT Roster Player Draft.
- March 11, 2014: The Wild left Eugenie Bouchard, Elena Bovina and Tara Snyder unprotected in the WTT Roster Player Draft, effectively making them free agents.
- March 26, 2014: The Wild left Jim Courier unprotected at the end of the wildcard player protection window, effectively making him a free agent.
- July 16, 2014: The Wild signed Tim Smyczek as a substitute player.

== Individual honors and achievements ==
Anabel Medina Garrigues was named WTT Female Rookie of the Year.

Alex Bogomolov, Jr. was third in WTT in game-winning percentage in men's doubles. Aisam Qureshi was sixth.

== Charitable support ==
During each night of the 2014 season, the WTT team with the most aces received US$1,000 toward a local charity of the team's choice as part of a program called Mylan Aces. In the case of a tie, the award was split accordingly. The Wild earned $1,500 for Emily's Place through the program.
