= WLNY-TV =

Television station in Riverhead, New York

- Riverhead, New York; United States
- Channels: Digital: 29 (UHF); Virtual: 55
- Branding: New York 55; CBS News New York

Programming
- Affiliations: 55.1: Independent / CBS (alternate); for others, see § Subchannels

Ownership
- Owner: CBS Television Stations; (CBS LITV LLC)
- Sister stations: WCBS-TV

History
- Founded: November 9, 1982
- First air date: April 28, 1985
- Former call signs: WLIG (1985–1996); WLNY (1996–2009)
- Former channel numbers: Analog: 55 (UHF, 1985–2005); Digital: 57 (UHF, 2002–2009), 47 (UHF, 2009–2018), 27 (UHF, 2018–2019)
- Call sign meaning: Long Island, New York

Technical information
- Licensing authority: FCC
- Facility ID: 73206
- ERP: 1,000 kW
- HAAT: 193.9 m (636 ft)
- Transmitter coordinates: 40°53′50.3″N 72°54′54.2″W

Links
- Public license information: Public file; LMS
- Website: www.cbsnews.com/newyork/wlny/

WLNY-TV (channel 55), branded as New York 55, is an independent television station licensed to Riverhead, New York, United States. It is owned by the CBS Television Stations group alongside CBS flagship WCBS-TV (channel 2), with both stations sharing studios within the CBS Broadcast Center on West 57th Street in Midtown Manhattan. WLNY-TV's transmitter is located in Ridge, New York. Its over-the-air signal covers most of Long Island, and it is available on cable and satellite systems throughout the New York City television market.

Channel 55 went on air on April 28, 1985, as WLIG. For its first 26 years of existence, it was owned by Long Island businessman Michael Pascucci; it primarily offered older movies and syndicated shows, though it also featured a 10 p.m. newscast. It spent seven years fighting with Cablevision of Long Island for a channel on the cable system, a battle which sapped the station of potential viewers and was only resolved with the reinstatement of must-carry regulations. Those rules allowed WLNY to gain access to cable systems throughout the New York area, even while its location at some distance from New York City enabled it to carry popular syndicated shows also sold to the New York stations. In 1993, the station reinstated its local news department, which by 2011 was airing one Long Island–focused newscast each night.

CBS agreed to purchase WLNY in 2011 and took control in 2012, dissolving its existing news division for newscasts from the Broadcast Center which vary between WCBS newscast extensions and shows which air nationwide on fellow CBS-owned independents, but have no Long Island-specific focus. Since 2023, WLNY offers morning and 8 p.m. newscasts from WCBS-TV.

In 2021, the Los Angeles Times revealed that the purchase came with a membership to the exclusive Sebonack Golf Club in Southampton, built by Pascucci, which CBS Television Stations president Peter Dunn treated as his own; another executive joked in a call that the acquisition of WLNY represented the purchase of a golf membership, not a TV station. This was among several allegations against Dunn that led to his termination from the company.

== History ==
In 1965, the Island Broadcasting System, owner of WRIV in Riverhead and WALK in Patchogue, applied for a construction permit for channel 55. NBC newscaster Chet Huntley was a part-owner, and the company believed the station could obtain affiliation with that network. Huntley withdrew from ownership in the television station, possibly due to NBC company policy, before approval was given in 1967. The station would have primarily served Suffolk County. The station was never built, and in 1968 the Federal Communications Commission (FCC) sent WRIV-TV and seven other unbuilt ultra high frequency (UHF) stations orders to build or lose their permit.

=== WLIG (1985–1996) ===
Life Broadcasting Network, Inc., applied to the FCC in October 1979 seeking a construction permit to build channel 55. Life Broadcasting Network was owned by local businessman Michael Pascucci, who proposed to program channel 55 with "nondenominational religious and family programming". The FCC granted the permit in 1982. The station, WLIG, would broadcast from a transmitter in Ridge, and be loosely aligned with the Roman Catholic Diocese of Rockville Centre; its programming would be family-friendly, relying on old sitcoms and movies plus a 10 p.m. newscast covering Long Island. The Ridge site was further west than the original location, which was approved by the FCC but rejected by the Navy.

WLIG began broadcasting on April 28, 1985. It hoped to avoid the struggle that befell the previous attempt at Long Island–oriented commercial television, WSNL-TV (channel 67), which left the air after 20 months. The nightly newscast, News 55 Long Island, had three full-time staff and two camera crews; the station also aired a public affairs show, Focus on Long Island.

The defining struggle of WLIG's early years of operation was its battle to get on local cable systems, especially Cablevision of Long Island. In April 1985, when channel 55 took to the air, the system had 240,000 subscribers. At the time the station signed on, must-carry rules were in effect requiring cable systems to carry local stations within 35 miles (56 km) to subscribers, but only about 4,000 of the 240,000 subscribers to Cablevision of Long Island were within 35 miles of Riverhead. The must-carry rule was struck down by a federal appeals court in July 1985, but Cablevision did not add WLIG at launch, saying it was a distant station that would have required copyright fees and that it lacked channel capacity. By June 1987, WLIG was estimated to reach 200,000 viewers and was carried on eight of nine cable television providers on Long Island; Cablevision, the lone holdout, claimed that WLIG added nothing to the service they already offered and therefore refused to carry it. While it offered at one point to place the WLIG newscast on a public access channel, Pascucci wanted some of the station's entertainment programming—dismissed by a Cablevision spokesman as more duplicative "syndicated reruns and old movies"—to be carried as well and refused the offer. A cable subscriber advocacy group, New Yorkers for Fair Cable, claimed that the real reason was that WLIG competed with services that Cablevision owned and offered, specifically News 12 Long Island. In October 1987, BQ Cable Company began offering WLIG to subscribers in Brooklyn and Queens.

Pascucci entered into a deal to sell WLIG to First Century Broadcasting, a consortium headed by Ronn Haus, in 1988; Haus's Coast to Coast syndicated religious program aired on WLIG. In announcing the transaction, Pascucci acknowledged the station had made a loss since its construction, though he noted he would continue to operate channel 55 and characterized the sale as a method of raising capital. The deal then fell through; as a consequence, WLIG dropped its local news broadcasts in April 1989. It fired all but one of its news staff, who was kept on to anchor a five-minute local newscast, inserted into an early evening half-hour feed of CNN Headline News.

The early 1990s brought significant programming and cable carriage improvements for WLIG. It scored a major victory in early 1991 when it landed Wheel of Fortune, Jeopardy! and The Oprah Winfrey Show, which at that time were the top three syndicated programs on television; it was able to broadcast them because the station's Riverhead transmitter was outside of the radius of exclusivity of the major New York TV stations. The movie selection was improved with newer feature films. In 1992, after a much-awaited false start two years prior, Cablevision finally brought WLIG to its Long Island systems, adding more than 300,000 subscribers to the station's potential audience; by this time, it was breaking even. Pascucci hailed the development as the best news for ownership since putting channel 55 on the air. The station then relocated its main studios to a site on South Service Road in Melville, which also housed Pascucci-owned Oxford Resources Corporation, and in January 1994—after the reinstatement of must-carry laws put it on all remaining Long Island cable systems—it returned to the news business with a new 10 p.m. newscast.

The station was forced off the air when a 1995 wildfire in the Long Island Central Pine Barrens threatened its transmission facilities.

=== WLNY (1996–present) ===
The implications of must-carry and the consequent expansion of its reach continued to transform channel 55. In early 1996, the station opened news bureaus in Wayne, New Jersey, and Fairfield, Connecticut, and it obtained press credentials in New York City. The station cemented its broader reach and sought to distinguish itself from the multiple stations using "LI" in their call sign when it changed its call letters to WLNY, representing Long Island and New York, on September 1, 1996. The sale of Pascucci's auto leasing business, Pascucci Oxford Resources, in 1997 brought an additional cash infusion to the television station.

Despite its introduction to hundreds of thousands more cable homes as a result of must-carry, its location on the fringes of the New York City television market made cable television coverage of the station an ongoing concern. In 1997, the FCC allowed some cable providers in New Jersey to exclude WLNY from carriage. WLNY, along with WRNN-TV (channel 48) and WPXN-TV (channel 31), appealed, but the courts upheld the FCC decision. In 2003, the station moved to channel 10 on all Cablevision systems on Long Island, though in the rest of the metropolitan area, it continued to be seen on a variety of other, higher numbers. By 2008, the station was described as a "moneymaker" in a profile of Pascucci in The New York Times. Employees noted its quirky but friendly office culture and fewer resources than its New York City counterparts. For instance, the station lacked remote trucks to broadcast stories live; reporters had to hurry back to Melville to get their stories to air.

WLNY's TV 10/55 logo from October 2007 to March 2012, prior to its sale to CBS

The station began broadcasting in digital in May 2002. Three years later, it struck a deal with Qualcomm to surrender its analog license and build out full digital television transmission facilities on channel 57, allowing Qualcomm to use the channel 55 frequency for its MediaFLO service. At the time, approximately 92% of Long Island's population received television service by cable or satellite, and the station had several repeaters that would remain in analog, so the FCC approved the request, and on December 31, 2005, WLNY shut down its analog signal and became a digital-only station. On June 12, 2009, when all remaining full-service stations converted to digital, WLNY switched from channel 57 to channel 47, which until the switchover date had been occupied by the analog signal of WNJU. Local programming remained in standard definition until April 9, 2012, when WLNY started broadcasting in high definition for the first time.

=== CBS ownership ===
WLNY TV 10/55 logo from 2012 to 2023

On December 12, 2011, CBS Television Stations announced its intent to purchase WLNY-TV, creating a duopoly with the CBS network's flagship station, WCBS-TV. The terms of the purchase were originally not made public, though an FCC application for the purchase later revealed that CBS had purchased WLNY for $55 million. The company announced that it would add additional on-air staff and expand WLNY's local news programming outside the 11 p.m. newscast that the station had at the time. The FCC approved the sale, and CBS took control of the station on June 29, 2012, giving the company its tenth television station duopoly—as well as its largest duopoly by market size. The sale to CBS did not include repeaters WLNY-CD (channel 45) in Mineola, New York, WLIG-LD (channel 17) in Morristown, New Jersey, and W27CD in Stamford, Connecticut, which were sold separately to Local Media TV Holdings, LLC.

Ahead of CBS assuming control of WLNY, the station discontinued its local newscasts in March 2012; about 30 of the station's 55 employees were to be retained by CBS. Only one on-air personality, Richard Rose, remained with WLNY as it transitioned to CBS ownership. After the acquisition, the station resumed airing local news programs, this time originating from the CBS Broadcast Center in Manhattan. Even though the station's local programs continued to originate from Manhattan, not Melville, CBS leased the facility from Pascucci for about eight years. WLNY continues to carry the Midnight Mass on Christmas Eve from St. Agnes Cathedral in Rockville Centre, New York.

In early July 2018, WLNY-TV completed its move to UHF channel 27 under special temporary authority, allowing T-Mobile to deploy cellular service in the 600 MHz band sooner; T-Mobile had been reaching deals with other stations to accelerate its use of the spectrum it had obtained in the 2016 wireless spectrum auction. The station then moved to UHF channel 29 in early August 2019 in phase 4 of the ensuing repack, which cleared the 600 MHz band nationally.

A January 2021 investigation by the Los Angeles Times based on complaints to the Pennsylvania Human Relations Commission revealed that, as part of the 2011 transaction by which Pascucci sold WLNY-TV to CBS, Peter Dunn, the head of CBS Television Stations, gained the use of a CBS-paid membership to the exclusive Sebonack Golf Club in Southampton, which Pascucci built and owns. The membership allowed Dunn to make connections to billionaires such as fellow member Stephen Ross. Dunn was revealed to have treated this membership as a personal perk of the sale; per the Los Angeles Times, a colleague, CBS Entertainment Group chief operating officer Bryon Rubin joked about the WLNY purchase as "the acquisition of our golf membership ... I mean TV station" on a private call in December 2020. The investigation, which also raised concerns about alleged racist, sexist and homophobic comments and the work environment at CBS-owned KYW-TV in Philadelphia, led to the network placing Dunn and Steve Friend, the senior vice president of news for the station group, on administrative leave and eventually to their termination.

In 2025, WLNY began airing a limited amount of Brooklyn Nets games due to Yankees conflicts on YES Network.

== Newscasts ==
After the acquisition by CBS, on July 2, 2012, the station debuted an hour-long 9 p.m. newscast and a two-hour morning show, Live from the Couch. The morning show was hosted by Carolina Bermudez, who left New York City radio station WHTZ after seven years co-hosting mornings with Elvis Duran.

David Friend, the news director for WCBS-TV, believed a 9 p.m. newscast could attract a new audience, particularly among people who did not make it in home in time to watch the news at 6 p.m. The new news offering was criticized for not focusing on Long Island, instead providing area-wide news coverage. Claude Solnik, writing for Long Island Business News, highlighted the use of Manhattan as a background and the airing of just one to two Long Island–related stories in the news program. This drew criticism from the Long Island Fair Media Council, accusing the station of abandoning its focus on Long Island. CBS management defended the lack of coverage as related to ongoing work at the WLNY Long Island facility in Melville. The facility, which was converted into a news bureau set up to cover Long Island news stories, was completed in July 2012; it also housed a separate sales force. On May 23, 2014, WLNY canceled Live from the Couch.

On April 8, 2019, the newscast was replaced by CBSN New York on WLNY, a rebroadcast of a prime time newscast produced by WCBS's local version of CBSN. In 2022, WLNY's newscast was replaced with CBS News New York Now, part of a series of new prime time newscasts on the company's The CW affiliates and independent stations. These programs combined local segments with national content produced at the CBS News and Innovation Lab in Fort Worth, Texas. The station rebranded as New York 55 in September 2023, coinciding with the eight CBS-owned CW affiliates leaving the network and adopting similar brands. The Now news format was discontinued and replaced with an 8 p.m. newscast airing on weeknights. Later in 2023, the station began airing the 7 and 8 a.m. CBS News New York newscasts originally created for streaming.

== Subchannels ==
WLNY-TV's transmitter is located in Ridge, New York. Its signal is multiplexed:

Subchannels of WLNY-TV
Subchannel	Res.	Short name	Programming
55.1	1080i	WLNY-DT	Main WLNY-TV programming
55.2	480i	QVC2	QVC2
55.3	480i	HSN2	HSN2
55.4	480i	HSN	HSN
55.5	480i	Nosey	Nosey
55.6	480i	Defy	Defy
