= Pinnacle Country Club =

Private country club in Arkansas, United States

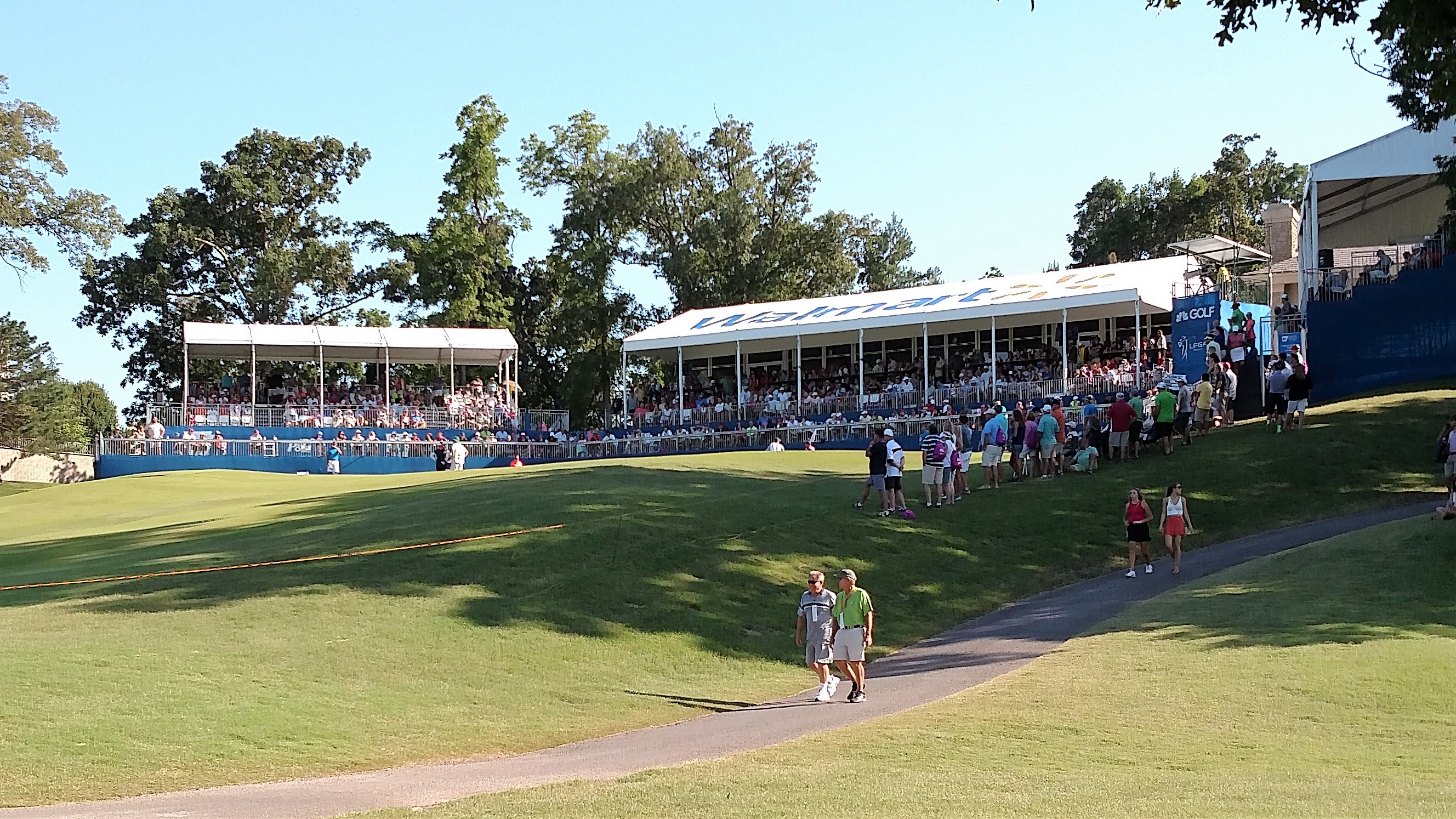
- 18th Hole viewing box in 2015

- Location within the United States Location within Arkansas
- 36.297°N 94.199°W

Club information
- Location: Rogers, Arkansas, U.S.
- Elevation: 1,250 feet (380 m)
- Established: 1988; 38 years ago
- Type: Private
- Tota holes: 18
- Tournaments: Walmart NW Arkansas Championship (since 2007)
- Greens: Tyee Creeping Bentgrass
- Fairways: Zorro Zoysia
- Website: pinnaclecc.com
- Designed by: Don Seachrest, Bruce Lietzke (1989, original); Randy Heckenkemper (2008 redesign)
- Par: 71
- Length: 7,001 yards (6,402 m)
- Course rating: 74.4
- Slope rating: 142

Pinnacle Country Club is a private country club and golf course in the Southern United States, located in Rogers, Arkansas, within the Northwest Arkansas metro.

Founded 38 years ago in 1988 as Champions Country Club, the course opened in 1990. Originally designed by Don Sechrest and tour pro Bruce Lietzke, it was redesigned by Randy Heckenkemper in 2008.

== Tour events ==
Pinnacle has hosted the Walmart NW Arkansas Championship on the LPGA Tour since its debut in 2007.

== Amenities ==
The club includes six tennis courts (five clay, one hardcourt) and a swimming pool.

== Course ==
Back tees

| Hole | Yards | Par | Hole | Yards | Par |
|---|---|---|---|---|---|
| 1 | 336 | 4 | 10 | 363 | 4 |
| 2 | 578 | 5 | 11 | 192 | 3 |
| 3 | 194 | 3 | 12 | 392 | 4 |
| 4 | 443 | 4 | 13 | 471 | 4 |
| 5 | 376 | 4 | 14 | 625 | 5 |
| 6 | 229 | 3 | 15 | 161 | 3 |
| 7 | 581 | 5 | 16 | 418 | 4 |
| 8 | 426 | 4 | 17 | 217 | 3 |
| 9 | 405 | 4 | 18 | 594 | 5 |
| Out | 3,568 | 36 | In | 3,433 | 35 |
| Source: | | | Total | 7,001 | 71 |
