= 1987 U.S. Women's Open =

Coordinates: 40.595°N 74.390°W

Tournament information
- Dates: July 23–28, 1987
- Location: Edison, New Jersey
- Course: Plainfield Country Club
- Organized by: USGA
- Tour: LPGA Tour

Statistics
- Par: 72
- Length: 6,284 yards (5,746 m)
- Field: 153 players, 68 after cut
- Cut: 152 (+8)
- Prize fund: $325,000
- Winner's share: $55,000

Champion
- (England) Laura Davies
- 285 (−3), playoff

Location in the United States
Location in New Jersey

The 1987 U.S. Women's Open was the 42nd U.S. Women's Open, held July 23–28 at Plainfield Country Club in Edison, New Jersey, a suburb southwest of New York City.

Laura Davies won the first of her four major titles in an 18-hole Tuesday playoff over runners-up Ayako Okamoto and Joanne Carner. The final round concluded on Monday after rain delays. It was Davies' first victory in the United States, and she became the fourth international winner of the championship.

Following this year, the Women's Open was not played in the New York City area for over a quarter century, returning in 2013 at Sebonack on eastern Long Island. In that time, the winner's share of the purse grew over tenfold, from $55,000 to $585,000.

== Round summaries ==
=== First round ===
Thursday, July 23, 1987

Place	Player	Score	To par
T1	(United States) Dot Germain	69	−3
T1	(United States) Bonnie Lauer	69	−3
3	(United States) Kathy Postlewait	70	−2
T4	(Japan) Ayako Okamoto	71	−1
T4	(United States) Sandra Palmer	71	−1
T4	(United States) Jody Rosenthal	71	−1
T7	(United States) Amy Alcott	72	E
T7	(United States) Marci Bozarth	72	E
T7	(England) Laura Davies	72	E
T7	(United States) Tammie Green	72	E
T7	(United States) Deb Richard	72	E

=== Second round ===
Friday, July 24, 1987

Place	Player	Score	To par
1	(England) Laura Davies	72-70=142	−2
T2	(Japan) Ayako Okamoto	71-72=143	−1
T2	(United States) Sandra Palmer	71-72=143	−1
T2	(United States) Jody Rosenthal	71-72=143	−1
T5	(United States) Dot Germain	69-75=144	E
T5	(United States) Nancy Lopez	71-72=144	E
T7	(United States) Marci Bozarth	72-73=145	+1
T7	(United States) Debbie Massey	76-69=145	+1
T7	(United States) Bonnie Lauer	69-76=145	+1
T7	(United States) Martha Nause	76-69=145	+1
T7	(United States) Dottie Pepper	73-72=145	+1
T7	(United States) Cindy Rarick	74-71=145	+1
T7	(United States) Deb Richard	72-73=145	+1

=== Third round ===
Saturday, July 25, 1987

Place	Player	Score	To par
1	(Japan) Ayako Okamoto	71-72-70=213	−3
2	(England) Laura Davies	72-70-72=214	−2
3	(United States) Martha Nause	76-69-70=215	−1
T4	(United States) JoAnne Carner	74-70-72=216	E
T4	(United States) Deedee Roberts	74-73-69=216	E
T6	(United States) Rosie Jones	75-71-71=217	+1
T6	(United States) Sally Quinlan	75-71-71=217	+1
T6	(United States) Jody Rosenthal	71-72-74=217	+1
T9	(United States) Tammie Green	72-74-72=218	+2
T9	(United States) Betsy King	75-73-70=218	+2
T9	(United States) Sandra Palmer	71-72-75=218	+2

=== Final round ===
Monday, July 27, 1987

Play on Sunday was postponed due to heavy rain.

Place	Player	Score	To par	Money ($)
T1	(England) Laura Davies	72-70-72-71=285	−3	Playoff
T1	(Japan) Ayako Okamoto	71-72-70-72=285	−3	Playoff
T1	(United States) JoAnne Carner	74-70-72-69=285	−3	Playoff
T4	(United States) Betsy King	75-73-70-71=289	+1	13,461
T4	(United States) Jody Rosenthal	71-72-74-72=289	+1	13,461
T6	(United States) Debbie Massey	76-69-74-71=290	+2	9,741
T6	(United States) Deedee Roberts	74-73-69-74=290	+2	9,741
8	(United States) Martha Nause	76-69-70-76=291	+3	8,390
T9	(United States) Kathy Postlewait	70-79-73-70=292	+4	7,111
T9	(United States) Rosie Jones	75-71-71-75=292	+4	7,111
T9	(United States) Sally Quinlan	75-71-71-75=292	+4	7,111

=== Playoff ===
Tuesday, July 28, 1987

Place	Player	Score	To par	Money ($)
1	(England) Laura Davies	71	−1	55,000
T2	(Japan) Ayako Okamoto	73	+1	23,824
T2	(United States) JoAnne Carner	74	+2	23,824
