= The Ritz-Carlton Dallas, Las Colinas =

Golf resort in Irving, Texas, United States

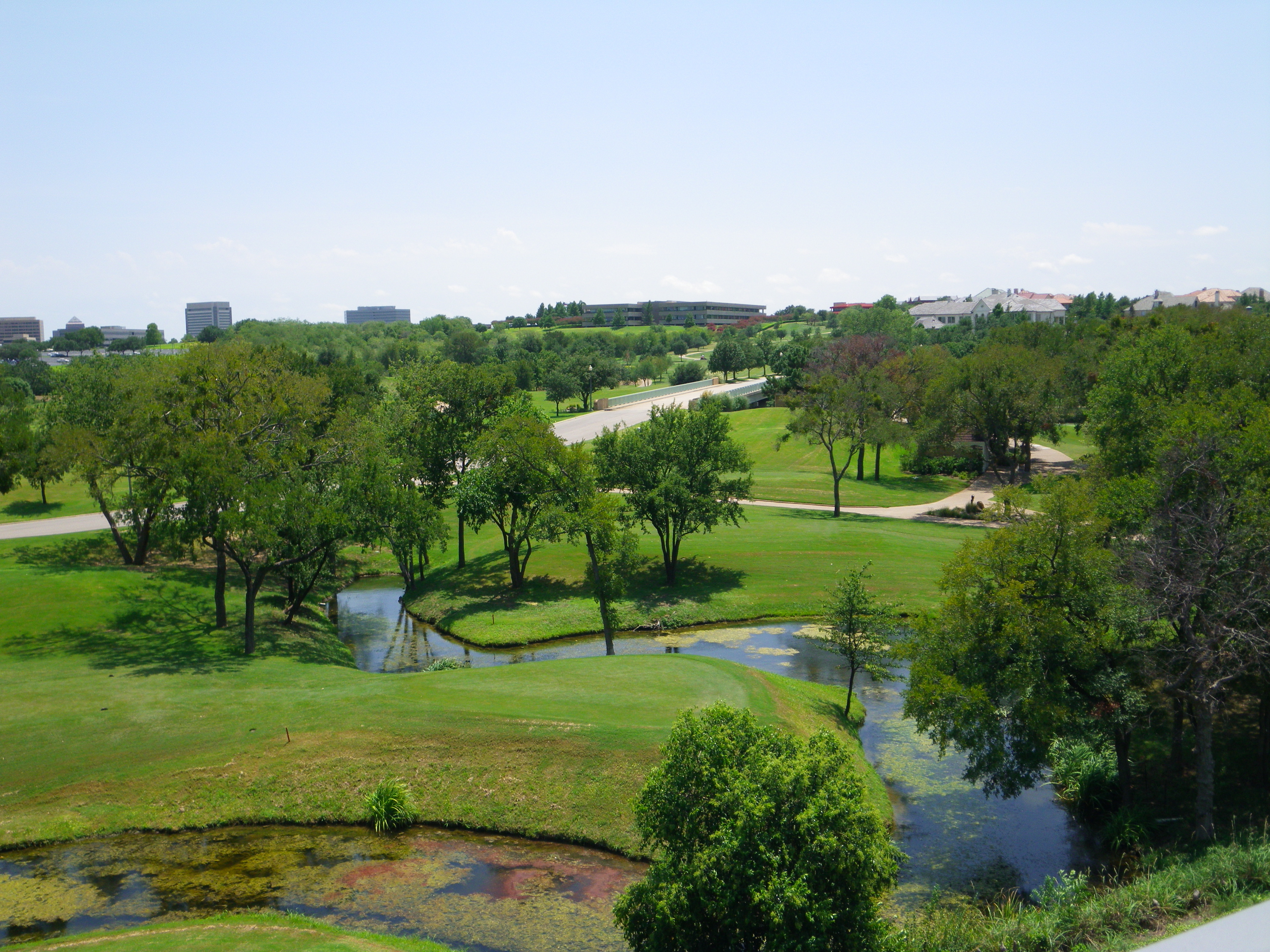
- TPC Las Colinas in 2009

- Location within the United States Location within Texas
- 32.864°N 96.958°W

Club information
- Location: Irving, Texas
- Elevation: 500 feet (150 m)
- Established: 1983; 43 years ago
- Type: Resort
- Owner: Partners Group and Trinity Fund Advisors
- Operator: Marriott International
- Tota holes: 36
- Tournaments: AT&T Byron Nelson (1983–2017)
- Greens: Creeping Bentgrass
- Fairways: 419 Bermuda
- Website: lascolinasresortdallas.com

TPC Las Colinas
- Designed by: Jay Morrish; Byron Nelson
- Par: 70
- Length: 7,166 yards (6,553 m)
- Course rating: 76.0
- Slope rating: 142

Cottonwood Valley
- Designed by: Jay Morrish; Robert Trent Jones, Jr.
- Par: 71
- Length: 7,120 yards (6,511 m)
- Course rating: 74.9
- Slope rating: 136

The Ritz-Carlton Dallas, Las Colinas is a golf resort in Irving, Texas, United States. The resort contains a 431-room hotel, two restaurants, lounge bars, a spa, swimming pool, gym, tennis courts and two golf courses, featuring a Tournament Players Club course, TPC Las Colinas, that hosted the PGA Tour's annual AT&T Byron Nelson from 1983 to 2017.

== History ==
The Four Seasons Resort and Club Dallas at Las Colinas was originally developed and owned by USAA Real Estate Company. The golf club opened first, in 1983, while the adjoining Four Seasons Hotel opened in 1986.

California-based investment firm BentleyForbes bought the resort from USAA in 2006 for $200 million. BentleyForbes borrowed $175 million against the hotel that same year and invested $60 million in renovations, right before the 2008 financial crisis and the Great Recession caused business at the hotel to drop significantly. BentleyForbes's lenders foreclosed on the hotel in 2010 and sold it at auction on June 1, 2010, after BentleyForbes missed multiple mortgage payments. The lenders themselves bought the property, for $122 million, placing it under the control of CW Capital Asset Management.

CW sold the resort to Blackstone Inc. in 2014 for $150 million. Blackstone sold it to Extell Development Co. in 2018 for $235 million. Extell sold it to Partners Group and Trinity Fund Advisors in 2022.

Marriott International assumed management on December 15, 2022, and the resort was rebranded The Las Colinas Resort, Dallas as a temporary name during a $55 million renovation. The Interior was done by Jeffrey Beers International and Leo A Daly. It was renamed The Ritz-Carlton Dallas, Las Colinas on January 23, 2024.

== Golf ==
The resort is known for its golf facilities, which includes the TPC Las Colinas championship course that was designed by Jay Morrish in consultation with Byron Nelson and Ben Crenshaw. The course was constructed as a TPC stadium course, incorporating nine holes from the original Las Colinas Sports Club layout. Since it opened in 1983 (Crenshaw won the 1st event in 1983, see wall of champions inside the sports club), it hosted the PGA Tour's Byron Nelson event from 1983 to 2017.

Starting in 1994, the PGA Tour also made use of the resort's second course, Cottonwood Valley, for the first two rounds of the Byron Nelson Championship in order to lessen the impact of weather delays. This course was also designed by Jay Morrish this time alongside renowned golf course architect Robert Trent Jones, Jr.

The resort also includes the Byron Nelson Golf School, a driving range and other practice facilities.

== Rating ==
The resort is the only AAA Five Diamond Award resort in Texas.
