= Sally Quinlan =

American professional golfer (born 1961)

Personal information
- Nationality: United States
- Born: May 20, 1961 (age 65)
- Height: 5 ft 8 in (1.73 m)

Career
- Sport: Golf
- College: University of Miami
- Turned professional: 1983
- Former tour: LPGA Tour (1983–1990)
- Professional wins: 1

Number of wins by tour
- LPGA Tour: 1

Best results in LPGA major championships
- Chevron Championship: T26: 1987
- Women's PGA C'ship: T9: 1988
- U.S. Women's Open: T9: 1987
- du Maurier Classic: T39: 1987

Sally Quinlan (born May 20, 1961) is an American professional golfer who played on the LPGA Tour.

== Career ==
Quinlan was runner-up in the 1983 U.S. Women's Amateur. She won once on the LPGA Tour in 1984.

== Professional wins ==
=== LPGA Tour wins (1) ===
No.	Date	Tournament	Winning score	Margin of victory	Runner-up
1	Aug 19, 1984	MasterCard International Pro-Am	−4 (72-71-67-74=284)	5 strokes	(United States) Jane Geddes
