= Plainfield Country Club =

Country club and golf course in New Jersey, US

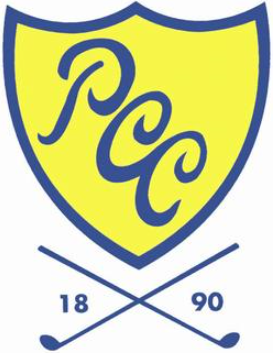
- Interactive map of Plainfield Country Club
- 40°35′40″N 74°23′22″W

Club information
- Location: Edison, New Jersey, US
- Established: 1890
- Type: Parkland (private)
- Total holes: 18
- Tournaments: The Barclays; 1978 U.S. Amateur; 1987 U.S. Women's Open
- Website: plainfieldcc.com
- Designed by: Donald Ross (1921) Gil Hanse & Jim Wagner (1999 renovation)
- Par: 70 (for the 2015 Barclays), 72 normally
- Length: 7,091 yd (6,484 m)
- Course rating: 75.3
- Slope rating: 146

Plainfield Country Club is a private country club and golf course located in Edison in Middlesex County, New Jersey, United States. It was founded in 1890 as the Hillside Tennis Club. Its golf course was designed in 1916 by golf course designer Donald Ross, and opened BC for play in 1921. The architect of the clubhouse was Roger Bullard.

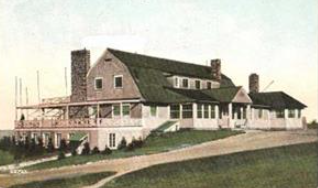
The clubhouse, as shown on a postcard, of Plainfield Country Club in 1909.

== Handicap system ==
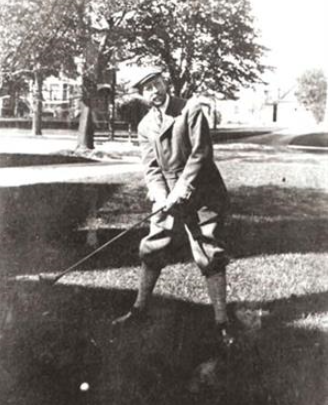
Calkins in 1909

In 1904, Leighton Calkins—who served as the mayor of Plainfield, New Jersey, from 1915 through 1920—created the handicap system currently used in golf today. In honor of Calkins, a set of tees at the Plainfield Country Club bears his name.

== Later history ==
Plainfield Country Club has been home to the 1978 U.S. Amateur, the 1987 U.S. Women's Open, several state and regional championships, and has been ranked among the best in the country. In 2011, it was home to The Barclays golf tournament, the first PGA Tour FedEx Cup playoff event. In August 2015, Plainfield Country Club again hosted the Barclays PGA golf tournament.
