= Sebonack Golf Club =

Golf course in Southampton, New York

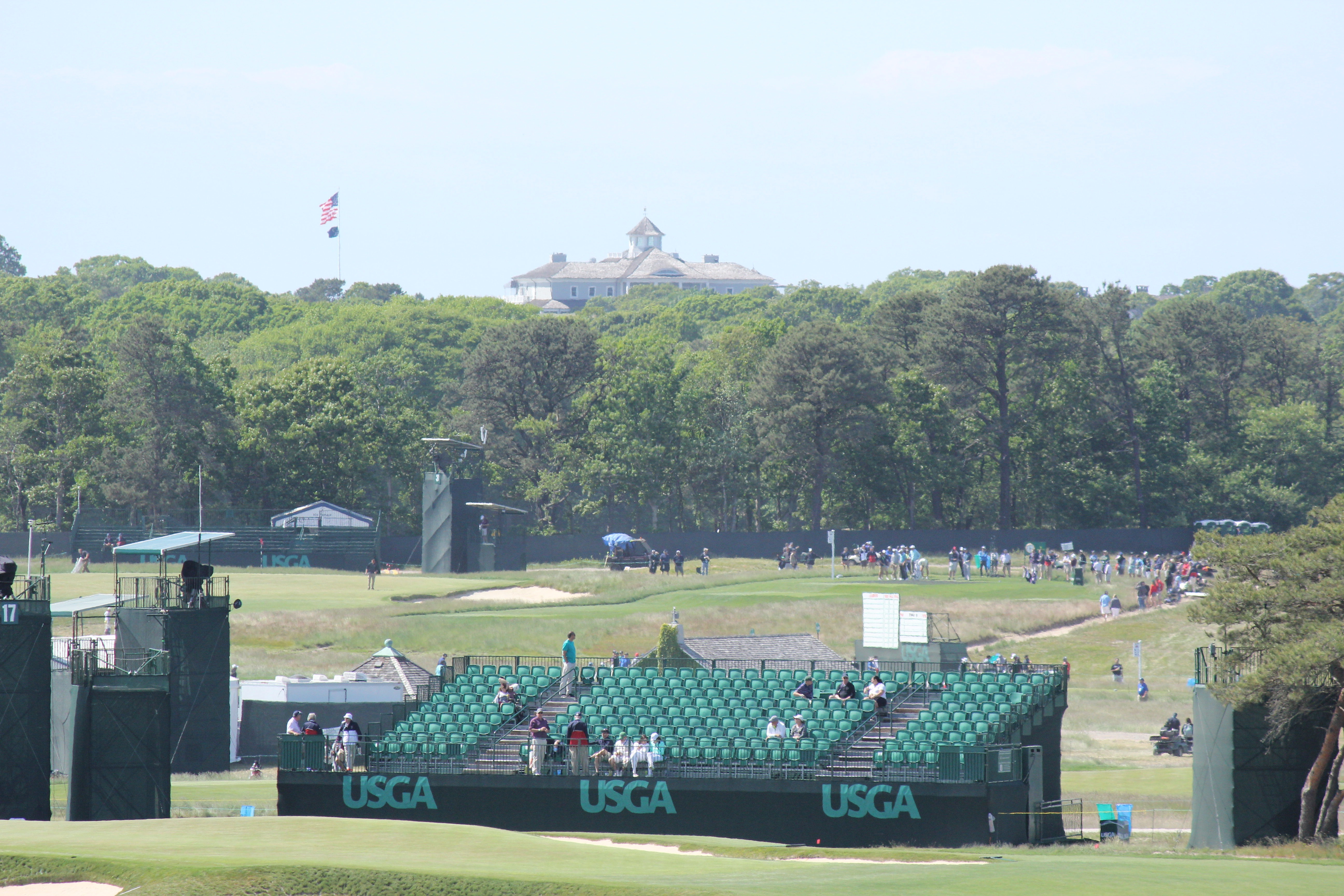
- Sebonack clubhouse as viewed from Shinnecock Hills.

- Location in the United States Location in New York
- 40°54′40″N 72°27′20″W

Club information
- Location: Southampton, New York
- Established: 2006
- Type: Private
- Owner: Michael Pascucci
- Total holes: 18
- Tournaments: 2013 U.S. Women's Open
- Designed by: Jack Nicklaus & Tom Doak
- Par: 72
- Length: 7,220 yd (6,600 m)
- Course rating: 77.3
- Slope rating: 148

Sebonack Golf Club is a private golf course in Southampton, New York, located on the Great Peconic Bay on Long Island. Opened in 2006, the course was designed by Jack Nicklaus and Tom Doak and is adjacent to the National Golf Links of America and Shinnecock Hills Golf Club. The Clubhouse and guest cottages were designed by Hart Howerton.

When it opened, Sebonack was noted as one of the priciest private clubs, with membership starting at half a million dollars. It is owned by Michael Pascucci.

Sebonack was the host of the 2013 U.S. Women's Open, the first time the championship had been played on Long Island and the first in the greater New York City area since 1987.It features a 19th hole par 3 and players/members have been known for playing a unique putting game on the extra practice green next to the clubhouse overlooking the Great Peconic Bay.

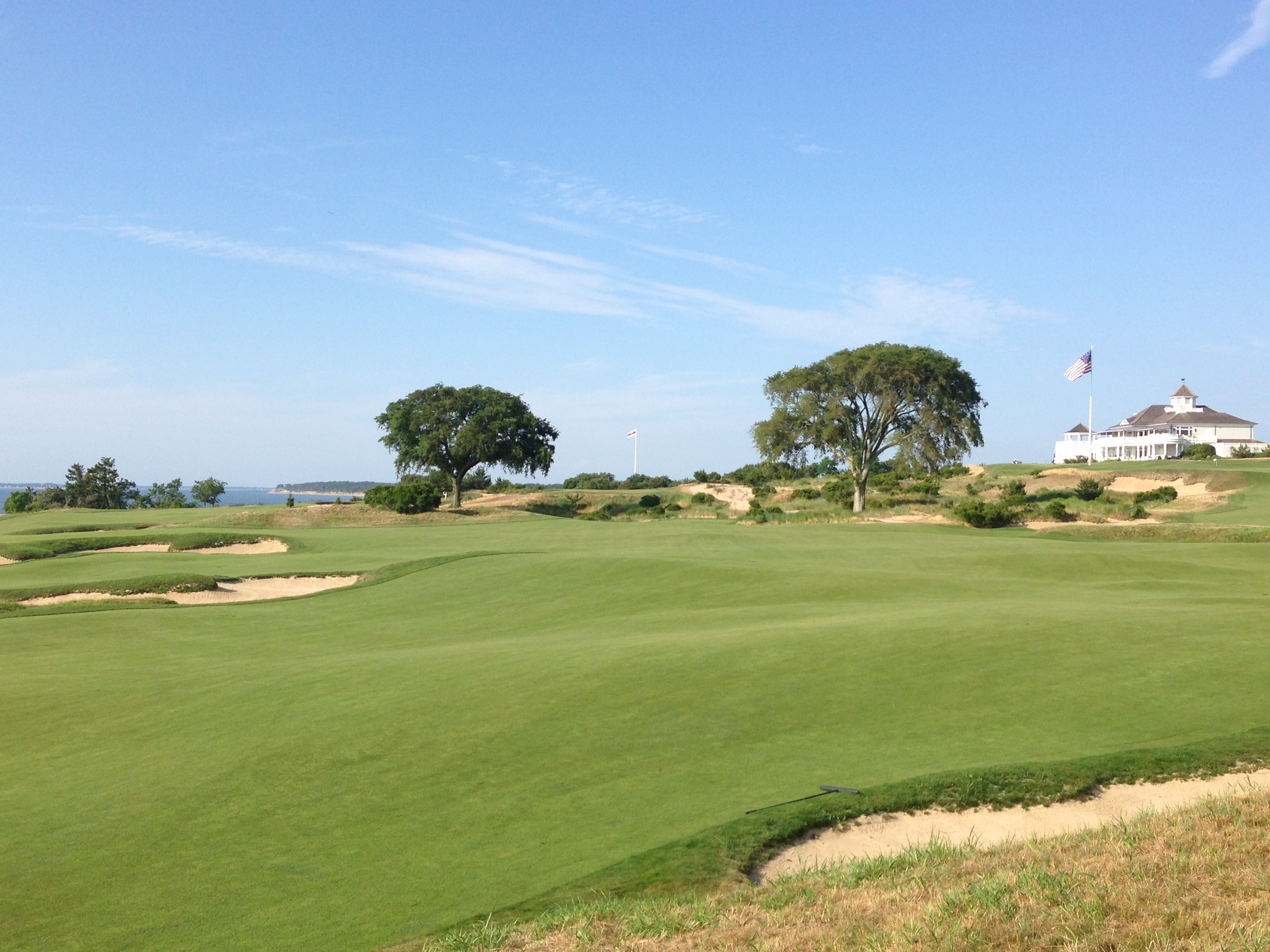
Sebonack - View of the clubhouse

Sebonack Golf Club
Tee	Rating/Slope	1	2	3	4	5	6	7	8	9	Out	10	11	12	13	14	15	16	17	18	In	Total
Black	77.3 / 148	355	454	442	235	345	418	475	189	549	3463	383	466	165	550	432	616	376	210	560	3757	7220
Blue	74.6 / 140	337	414	416	205	330	386	438	165	532	3240	360	430	136	529	398	580	353	183	525	3706	6946
White	71.8 / 135	316	391	377	183	309	341	402	144	483	3005	324	401	121	495	357	536	331	152	501	3404	6409
Red	73.5 / 132	306	315	318	112	273	270	321	130	445	2490	339	349	120	457	320	494	347	130	428	2984	5474
Par		4	4	4	3	4	4	4	3	5	35	4	4	3	5	4	5	4	3	5	37	72
SI		15	1	5	13	17	7	3	11	9		14	2	18	6	10	8	4	16	12
