= Walmart NW Arkansas Championship =

Golf tournament

Tournament information
- Location: Rogers, Arkansas
- Established: 2007, 19 years ago
- Course: Pinnacle Country Club
- Par: 71
- Length: 6,438 yards (5,887 m)
- Tour: LPGA Tour
- Format: Stroke play – 54 holes
- Prize fund: $3.0 million
- Month played: September

Tournament record score
- Aggregate: 192 Nasa Hataoka (2018); 192 Yuna Nishimura (2026)
- To par: −21 as above

Current champion
- (Japan) Yuna Nishimura

Location map
- Location within the United States Location within Arkansas

The Walmart NW Arkansas Championship is an annual women's professional golf tournament on the LPGA Tour in Rogers, Arkansas, north of Fayetteville. First played nineteen years ago in 2007, all editions of the tournament have been played at Pinnacle Country Club.

Procter & Gamble (P&G), a manufacturer of a wide range of consumer goods, became the title sponsor in 2008. The 2008 and 2009 editions were prefaced with "P&G Beauty", with the word "Beauty" dropped starting in 2010. Walmart, based in nearby Bentonville and the world's largest public corporation, became the presenting sponsor in 2010. Walmart became the title sponsor in 2011, with P&G as the presenting sponsor.

== History ==
Due to inclement weather in 2007, only the first round on Friday was completed which classified it as an "unofficial tournament." An LPGA event must be at least 36 holes to qualify as official. Stacy Lewis, then a senior at the University of Arkansas, led after 18 holes and was declared the unofficial winner. The tournament purse was cut in half and all professionals received winnings based on 50% of what they would have earned had the tournament been completed. Because Lewis was an amateur she received no earnings, and all earnings by LPGA members were considered unofficial. In 2025, heavy rain also resulted in only one round being completed. Similar to 2007, the win was considered unofficial, however, the players received two-thirds ($2 million of $3 million) the original purse payout.

Tournament names through the years:

- 2007: LPGA NW Arkansas Championship Presented by John Q. Hammons
- 2008–2009: P&G Beauty NW Arkansas Championship Presented by John Q. Hammons
- 2010: P&G NW Arkansas Championship Presented by Walmart
- 2011–present: Walmart NW Arkansas Championship Presented by P&G

== Winners ==
Year	Date	Champion	Score	To par	Margin of victory	Purse ($)	Winner's share ($)
2026	Sep 27	(Japan) Yuna Nishimura	192	−21	5 strokes	3,000,000	450,000
2025†	Sep 21	(Japan) Minami Katsu (United States) Sarah Schmelzel (tie)	63	−8	n/a	2,000,000	183,095 (each)
2024	Sep 29	(Thailand) Thidapa Suwannapura	196	−17	Playoff	3,000,000	450,000
2023	Oct 1	(South Korea) Ryu Hae-ran	194	−19	3 strokes	2,300,000	345,000
2022	Sep 25	(Thailand) Atthaya Thitikul	196	−17	Playoff	2,300,000	345,000
2021	Sep 26	(Japan) Nasa Hataoka (2)	197	−16	1 stroke	2,300,000	345,000
2020	Aug 30	(United States) Austin Ernst	193	−20	2 strokes	2,300,000	345,000
2019	Jun 30	(South Korea) Park Sung-hyun	195	−18	1 stroke	2,000,000	300,000
2018	Jun 24	(Japan) Nasa Hataoka	192	−21	6 strokes	2,000,000	300,000
2017	Jun 25	(South Korea) Ryu So-yeon	195	−18	2 strokes	2,000,000	300,000
2016	Jun 26	(New Zealand) Lydia Ko	196	−17	3 strokes	2,000,000	300,000
2015	Jun 28	(South Korea) Na Yeon Choi	198	−15	2 strokes	2,000,000	300,000
2014	Jun 29	(United States) Stacy Lewis (2)	201	−12	1 stroke	2,000,000	300,000
2013	Jun 23	(South Korea) Inbee Park	201	−12	Playoff	2,000,000	300,000
2012	Jul 1	(Japan) Ai Miyazato	201	−12	1 stroke	2,000,000	300,000
2011	Sep 11	(Taiwan) Yani Tseng (2)	201	−12	Playoff	2,000,000	300,000
2010	Sep 12	(Taiwan) Yani Tseng	200	−13	1 stroke	2,000,000	300,000
2009	Sep 13	(South Korea) Jiyai Shin	204	−9	Playoff	1,800,000	270,000
2008	Jul 6	(South Korea) Seon Hwa Lee	201	−15	1 stroke	1,700,000	255,000
2007*	Sep 7	(United States) Stacy Lewis (a)	65	−7	1 stroke	625,000	0

* The 2007 tournament was reduced to 18 holes and declared unofficial because of multiple rain delays; the $1.25 million purse was halved. Lewis was an amateur; three professionals at 66 tied for the top money spot. The original tournament dates in 2007 were September 7–9.
† The 2025 tournament was reduced to 18 holes and declared unofficial because of multiple rain delays. The $3.0 million purse was reduced to $2.0 million. No CME points were awarded and the money was considered unofficial.

== Tournament records ==
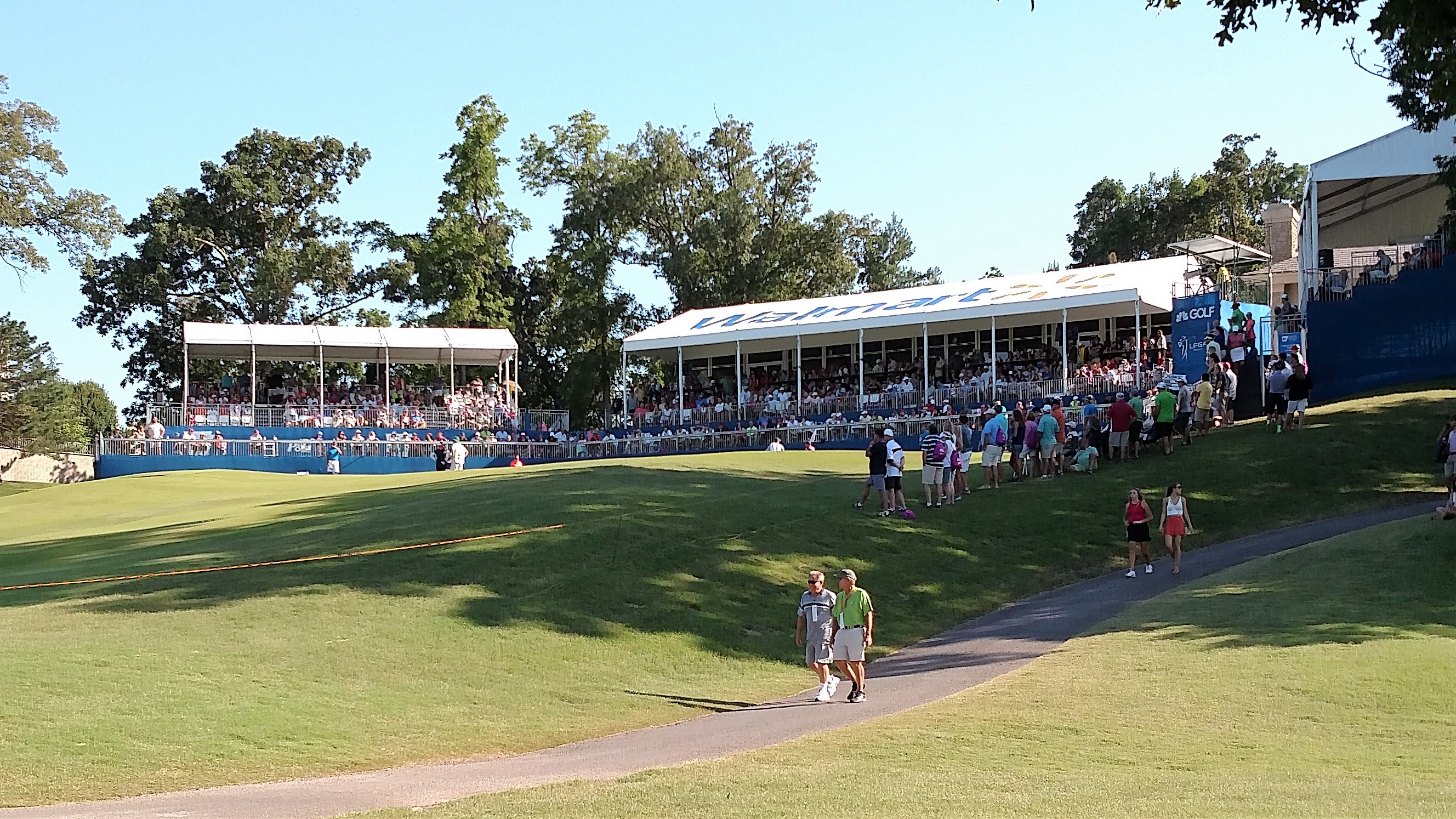
18th Hole viewing box in 2015

Year	Player	Score	To par	Round
2024	Lucy Li	60	−11	3rd
