= Paz Echeverría =

Chilean golfer

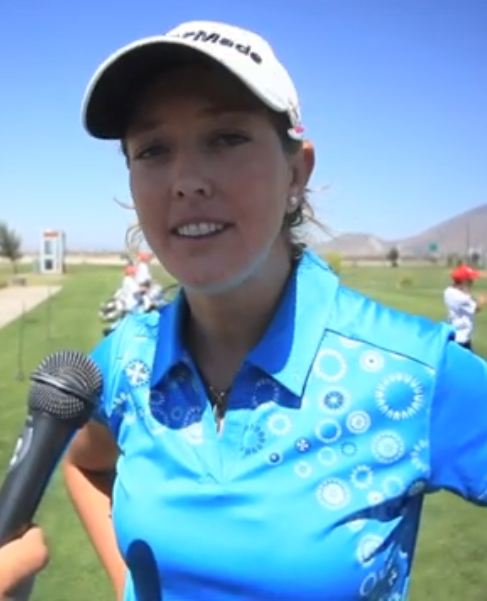
- In a 2012 interview

Personal information
- Nationality: Chile
- Born: 7 May 1985 (age 41) Santiago, Chile
- Height: 5 ft 10 in (178 cm)

Career
- Sport: Golf
- Turned professional: 2011
- Former tours: LPGA Tour; Symetra Tour

Best results in LPGA major championships
- Chevron Championship: CUT: 2015
- Women's PGA C'ship: CUT: 2013, 2014, 2015
- U.S. Women's Open: CUT: 2013
- Women's British Open: CUT: 2014
- Evian Championship: CUT: 2014

Paz Echeverría (born 7 May 1985) is a Chilean professional golfer.

She is only the second golfer from Chile to have a tour card on the LPGA Tour after Nicole Perrot.

For the 2016 season, she is playing on the second-tier Symetra Tour since she only earned conditional status on the LPGA Tour and hopes to earn enough world ranking points to qualify for the 2016 Olympics.

== Team appearances ==
Amateur

- Espirito Santo Trophy (representing Chile): 2002, 2004, 2006, 2008, 2010
