= Randy Heckenkemper =

Golf course architect and solar energy entrepreneur

Randall J. Heckenkemper (born 1958) is an American golf course architect and solar energy entrepreneur.

== Background and career ==
Heckenkemper was born in Tulsa, Oklahoma and graduated from Oklahoma State University with a Bachelor of Science in Landscape Design. In 1980, Heckenkemper began his career working for Poe and Associates as a senior land planner that included a partnership with Jack Nicklaus and Associates. Their work included large-scale Master Planned communities throughout the United States.

In 1983, Heckenkemper assisted the partnership of Tom Weiskopf and Jay Morrish, where he participated in several high-profile golf courses including Troon Country Club and TPC Scottsdale in Arizona. In 1985, Heckenkemper went into business as the owner of Heckenkemper Golf Course Design.

Several of Heckenkemper's courses have received commendations, including The Territory Golf and CC and Forest Ridge Golf Club in Oklahoma, and Pinnacle Country Club in Arkansas, which hosts the Walmart NW Arkansas Championship for the LPGA. Another of Heckenkemper's courses, McDowell Mountain Golf Club, was the first in Arizona to be awarded Audubon Signature Status.

In 2016, inspired by years of working outdoors and with environmental and landscape construction professionals, Heckenkemper co-founded and is a partner in Site Solar, which designs and manufactures solar-powered, portable light towers and generators. Solar light towers are an alternative to diesel light towers and protect the environment by eliminating carbon emissions. Site Solar, which has locations and distributors throughout the southwest U.S., specializes in short- and long-term rental of portable, clean, renewable, bright, quiet light through solar power generation, and is especially suitable for the oil & gas industry, construction, public safety, mining, landfills, airports, events, and law enforcement/border patrol.
