= Jay Morrish =

American golf course designer (1936–2015)

- Born: 1936; Grand Junction, Colorado, U.S.
- Died: March 2, 2015 (aged 78); Highland Village, Texas, U.S.
- Education: Colorado State University (BS)
- Occupation: Architect
- Projects: Glen Abbey Golf Club (Oakville, Canada); Northwood Club (Dallas, Texas); TPC Scottsdale (Scottsdale, Arizona)

Jay Morrish (c. 1936 – March 2, 2015) was an American golf course designer. He graduated from Colorado State University with a degree in Landscape and Nursery Management. In 1964, he taught Horticulture at that university while pursuing graduate degrees.

== Career ==
Morrish served a four-year apprenticeship with Robert Trent Jones, and subsequently two years with George Fazio.

From 1972–1982, he worked for Jack Nicklaus as a member of his golf course design support staff. In 1983, Morrish left the Nicklaus organization and formed a partnership with PGA Tour professional Tom Weiskopf. The Morrish/Weiskopf partnership resulted in the design or updating of more than twenty golf courses. Carter Morrish, Jay Morrish's son, joined in 1998 to form Jay Morrish and Associates in 1988 where they designed the 2 courses at Boulders Resort & Spa. Pine Canyon Club Golf Course was the last golf course Morrish designed.

Morrish was a member of the American Society of Golf Course Architects, and was president of that body from 2002–2004. In 2007, Morrish was inducted into the Colorado Golf Hall of Fame in a ceremony at Columbine Country Club. He died at the age of 78 on March 2, 2015.

== Courses designed ==
The following is a partial list of courses designed by Jay Morrish:

- OD denotes courses for which Morrish is the original designer
- R denotes courses reconstructed by Morrish
- A denotes courses for which Morrish made substantial additions
- E denotes courses that Morrish examined and on the construction of which he consulted

Name	Contribution	Year built	City / Town	State / Province / Prefecture	Country	Comments
Shoal Greek GC	OD	1977	Birmingham	Alabama	United States	with Jack Nicklaus
Boulders R&S Scottsdale	OD	1984	Carefree	Arizona	United States	North Course (built 1985), South Course (built 1984), with Carter Morrish
Desert Highlands GC	OD	1984	Scottsdale	Arizona	United States	with Jack Nicklaus
Forest Highlands GC	OD	1986	Flagstaff	Arizona	United States	private, with Tom Weiskopf
Bent Creek Country Club	OD	1991	Lititz	Pennsylvania	United States	private. 2025 renovation by Andrew Green
Pine Canyon Club	OD	2004	Flagstaff	Arizona	United States	private, with Carter Morrish
TPC Scottsdale	OD	1986	Scottsdale	Arizona	United States	with Tom Weiskopf
Pine Canyon Club	OD	2004	Flagstaff	Arizona	United States	private, with Carter Morrish
The Reserve Club	OD	1998	Indian Wells	California	United States	with Tom Weiskopf
Troon North GC	OD	1990	Scottsdale	Arizona	United States	Monument and Pinnacle Courses, with Tom Weiskopf
Bear Creek GC	OD	1982	Murrieta	California	United States	with Jack Nicklaus
Marbella CC	OD	1989	San Juan Capistrano	California	United States	with Jack Nicklaus
Blackstone CC	OD	2007	Aurora	Colorado	United States	private, with Tom Weiskopf
Castle Pines GC	OD	1981	Castle Rock	Colorado	United States	with Jack Nicklaus
Colorado National GC	OD	2003	Erie	Colorado	United States	with Jack Nicklaus, originally named Vista Ridge GC
CC of the Rockies	OD	1984	Edwards	Colorado	United States	with Jack Nicklaus
Sonnenalp Club	OD	1980	Edwards	Colorado	United States	private, with Bob Cupp
The Club at Ravenna	OD	2006	Littleton	Colorado	United States	private, with Jack Nicklaus
Bear's Paw CC	OD	1980	Naples	Florida	United States	with Jack Nicklaus
Sailfish Point CC	OD	1981	Stuart	Florida	United States	with Jack Nicklaus
Walden Lake G&CC	OD	1978	Plant City	Florida	United States	with Jack Nicklaus
Annandale GC	OD	1981	Madison	Mississippi	United States	with Jack Nicklaus
CC of St. Albans	OD	1981	St. Albans	Missouri	United States	with Jack Nicklaus
CC at Muirfield Village	OD	1982	Dublin	Ohio	United States	with Jack Nicklaus
Double Eagle Club	OD	1992	Galena	Ohio	United States	with Tom Weiskopf
Muirfield Village GC	OD	1974	Dublin	Ohio	United States	with Jack Nicklaus
Lochinvar GC	OD	1980	Houston	Texas	United States	with Jack Nicklaus
Pine Dunes Resort & GC	OD	2001	Frankston	Texas	United States	with Carter Morrish
Northwood Club	R/A	1946	Dallas	Texas	United States	with Tom Weiskopf, redesigned in 1990
Glen Abbey GC	OD	1976	Oakville	Ontario	Canada	with Jack Nicklaus
New St. Andrews GC	OD	1976	Ōtawara	Tochigi	Japan	with Jack Nicklaus
The Wilds Golf Club	OD	1996	Prior Lake	Minnesota	United States	with Tom Weiskopf
