= Dave Williams (golf coach) =

American college golf coach

Biographical details
- Born: October 14, 1918; Randolph, Texas, U.S.
- Died: December 16, 1998 (aged 80); Wharton, Texas, U.S.
- Education: East Texas State

Coaching career (HC unless noted)
- 1951–1987: Houston

Accomplishments and honors

Championships
- 16 NCAA Championship (1956–1960, 1962, 1964–1967, 1969, 1970, 1977, 1982, 1984, 1985); 5 MVC (1956–1960); 9 SWC (1974–1980, 1984, 1985)

Awards
- GCAA Hall of Fame (1980)

David Glenwood Williams (October 14, 1918 – December 16, 1998) was an American college golf coach. He is known as "The Father of College Golf" due to how he revolutionized the sport in the United States. As head coach of the Houston Cougars men's golf program, he won 16 National Collegiate Athletic Association (NCAA) team national championships and coached eight individual national champions.

== Life ==
Williams was born in Randolph, Texas. Before becoming head coach at Houston, he was a professor in the engineering department at the university, having earned degrees from East Texas State Teachers College and the United States Naval Academy. After he began to beat then-UH athletic director Harry Fouke at golf on a regular basis, Fouke made him the head golf coach. He served in that position from 1951 to 1987.

In addition to winning 16 team national championships and eight individual ones, Williams' teams won 14 conference championships and 342 tournaments overall. Several of his players would go on to have professional golf careers, including Fred Couples, Steve Elkington, Nick Faldo, Butch Harmon, Bruce Lietzke, John Mahaffey, Dave Marr, Phil Rodgers, Bill Rogers and Fuzzy Zoeller. Future broadcaster Jim Nantz also played under him.

Williams' contributions to the sport live on to this day, as the scoring system he devised is used at the high school level all the way up to Division I. He was also the first coach to start outfitting his teams in the same uniforms featuring the school colors.

Williams died in Wharton, Texas in 1998. The Dave Williams Golf Academy at the Golf Club of Houston is named after him.

== Head coaching record ==
Record table
| Season | Team | Overall | Conference | Standing | Postseason |
|---|---|---|---|---|---|
Houston Cougars (Missouri Valley Conference) (1951–1960)
| 1951–52 | Houston | | | 2nd | NCAA 11th place |
| 1952–53 | Houston | | | 3rd | NCAA 8th place |
| 1953–54 | Houston | | | 2nd | NCAA 5th place |
| 1954–55 | Houston | | | 2nd | NCAA T–4th place |
| 1955–56 | Houston | | | 1st | NCAA Champion |
| 1956–57 | Houston | | | 1st | NCAA Champion |
| 1957–58 | Houston | | | 1st | NCAA Champion |
| 1958–59 | Houston | | | 1st | NCAA Champion |
| 1959–60 | Houston | | | 1st | NCAA Champion |
Houston Cougars (Independent) (1960–1972)
| 1960–61 | Houston | | | | NCAA 12th place |
| 1961–62 | Houston | | | | NCAA Champion |
| 1962–63 | Houston | | | | NCAA University Division Runner-up |
| 1963–64 | Houston | | | | NCAA University Division Champion |
| 1964–65 | Houston | | | | NCAA University Division Champion |
| 1965–66 | Houston | | | | NCAA University Division Champion |
| 1966–67 | Houston | | | | NCAA University Division Champion |
| 1967–68 | Houston | | | | NCAA University Division Runner-up |
| 1968–69 | Houston | | | | NCAA University Division Champion |
| 1969–70 | Houston | | | | NCAA University Division Champion |
| 1970–71 | Houston | | | | NCAA University Division Runner-up |
| 1971–72 | Houston | | | | NCAA University Division Runner-up |
Houston Cougars (Southwest Conference) (1972–1987)
| 1972–73 | Houston | | | 2nd | NCAA University Division 6th place |
| 1973–74 | Houston | | | T–1st | NCAA Division I 3rd place |
| 1974–75 | Houston | | | T–1st | NCAA Division I 12th place |
| 1975–76 | Houston | | | 1st | NCAA Division I 3rd place |
| 1976–77 | Houston | | | 1st | NCAA Division I Champion |
| 1977–78 | Houston | | | 1st | NCAA Division I 18th place |
| 1978–79 | Houston | | | 1st | NCAA Division I T–9th place |
| 1979–80 | Houston | | | 1st | NCAA Division I 18th place |
| 1980–81 | Houston | | | 2nd | NCAA Division I 3rd place |
| 1981–82 | Houston | | | 2nd | NCAA Division I Champion |
| 1982–83 | Houston | | | 2nd | NCAA Division I 3rd place |
| 1983–84 | Houston | | | 1st | NCAA Division I Champion |
| 1984–85 | Houston | | | 1st | NCAA Division I Champion |
| 1985–86 | Houston | | | T–2nd | NCAA Division I 5th place |
| 1986–87 | Houston | | | T–2nd | NCAA Division I 10th place |
| Houston: | | | | MVC: 5 SWC: 9 National: 16 | |
| Total: | | | | | |
National champion Postseason invitational champion Conference regular season champion Conference regular season and conference tournament champion Division regular season champion Division regular season and conference tournament champion Conference tournament champion
