= Texas A&M Aggies Men's golf =

College golf program

Texas A&M Men's Golf
- Founded: 1926
- University: Texas A&M University
- Conference: SEC
- Athletic director: Trev Alberts
- Head coach: Brian Kortan (7th season)
- Location: College Station, Texas
- Course: Traditions Club; Par: 72; Yards: 7,250
- Nickname: Aggies
- Colors: Maroon and White

NCAA champions
- 2009

NCAA match play
- 2009, 2018, 2019

NCAA Championship appearances
- 1955, 1957, 1960, 1961, 1967, 1969, 1971, 1972, 1975, 1977, 1978, 1979, 1980, 1981, 1982, 1983, 1984, 1985, 1986, 1987, 1994, 1996, 1997, 2004, 2005, 2006, 2008, 2009, 2010, 2011, 2012, 2013, 2014, 2016, 2017, 2018, 2019, 2022, 2023, 2024, 2025, 2026

Conference champions
- SWC; 1926, 1948, 1960, 1961, 1962, 1963, 1967, 1969, 1982, 1987 Big 12; 2012

Individual conference champions
- SWC; Bobby Nichols (1956)

The Texas A&M Aggies men's golf team represents Texas A&M University in the NCAA Division I intercollegiate men's golf competition. The Aggies compete in the Southeastern Conference (SEC).

Texas A&M has won eleven Conference Team Championships. The Aggies have also won one national championship in 2009.

For the first decade of the program the Aggies did not a have full time head coach. The duties of coach were overseen by either the pro at Bryan country club or a member of the faculty. Some notable faculty members who coached the team include hall of fame football coach Dana X. Bible and Walter L. Penberthy, who founded The schools intramural program. Texas A&M's first full time head coach was Frank Anderson who had previously lead the track & field team.

Texas A&M's longest serving head coach was Bob Ellis who served for twenty-seven seasons. Under Ellis, the Aggies captured two Conference titles and made thirteen NCAA championship appearances. After retiring as head coach in 2000, Ellis continued as a golf instructor with the schools kinesiology department.

The programs only national championship came in 2009 under the leadership of JT Higgins. During Higgins tenure, the program also won their only Big 12 championship in 2012.

The Aggies are currently headed by Brian Kortan. During his tenure, the Aggies have made the NCAA championship in all but Kortan's first season.

== Head coach ==
#	Coach	Years	Seasons	Conference championships	National championships
1	Frank G. Anderson	1938 – 1942	5	0	0
2	Marty Karow	1946 – 1947	2	0	0
3	Gayther Nowell	1947 – 1951	4	1	0
4	Joe Fagan	1951 – 1960	10	1	0
5	Henry Ransom	1960 – 1974	14	5	0
6	Bob Ellis	1974 – 2001	27	2	0
7	JT Higgins	2001 – 2020	19	1	1
8	Brian Kortan	2021 – Present	6	0	0

== Yearly record ==
Legend
Team champions
Individual champions
Both team and individual champions

Season	Coach	Conference	NCAA
No Full Time Coach (SWC) (1926–1936)
1926	No Full Time Coach	1	X
1927	No Full Time Coach		X
1928	No Full Time Coach		X
1929	No Full Time Coach		X
1930	No Full Time Coach		X
1931	No Full Time Coach		X
1932	No Full Time Coach		X
1933	No Full Time Coach		X
1934	No Full Time Coach		X
1935	No Full Time Coach		X
1936	No Full Time Coach		X
1937	No Full Time Coach		X
Frank G. Anderson (SWC) (1937–1941)
1938	Frank G. Anderson		X
1939	Frank G. Anderson	3	X
1940	Frank G. Anderson		X
1941	Frank G. Anderson	3	X
1942	Frank G. Anderson	3	X
Vacant (SWC) (1942–1945)
1943	Vacant	Did Not Participate due to World War II	
1944	Vacant	Did Not Participate due to World War II	
1945	Vacant	Did Not Participate due to World War II	
Marty Karow (SWC) (1946–1947)
1946	Marty Karow		X
1947	Marty Karow	4	X
Gayther Nowell (SWC) (1947–1950)
1948	Gayther Nowell	1	X
1949	Gayther Nowell	2	X
1950	Gayther Nowell		X
Joe Fagan (SWC) (1950–1959)
1951	Joe Fagan	4	X
1952	Joe Fagan	4	X
1953	Joe Fagan	5	X
1954	Joe Fagan	5	X
1955	Joe Fagan	2	T27
1956	Joe Fagan	2	X
1957	Joe Fagan	2	X
1958	Joe Fagan	2	X
1959	Joe Fagan	3	X
Henry Ransom (SWC) (1959–1974)
1960	Henry Ransom	1	6
1961	Henry Ransom	1	5
1962	Henry Ransom	1	X
1963	Henry Ransom	1	X
1964	Henry Ransom	3	X
1965	Henry Ransom		X
1966	Henry Ransom		X
1967	Henry Ransom	1	17
1968	Henry Ransom		X
1969	Henry Ransom	1	22
1970	Henry Ransom	2	X
1971	Henry Ransom		X
1972	Henry Ransom		X
1973	Henry Ransom	6	X
1974	Henry Ransom	4	X
Bob Ellis (SWC) (1974–1996)
1975	Bob Ellis	6	33
1976	Bob Ellis	4	X
1977	Bob Ellis	2	11
1978	Bob Ellis	3	15
1979	Bob Ellis	2	T21
1980	Bob Ellis	4	15
1981	Bob Ellis	4	10
1982	Bob Ellis	1	4
1983	Bob Ellis	3	10
1984	Bob Ellis	4	10
1985	Bob Ellis	4	22
1986	Bob Ellis	4	24
1987	Bob Ellis	1	19
1988	Bob Ellis	4	X
1989	Bob Ellis	6	X
1990	Bob Ellis	5	X
1991	Bob Ellis	7	X
1992	Bob Ellis	4	X
1993	Bob Ellis	T6	X
1994	Bob Ellis	2	X
1995	Bob Ellis	2	X
1996	Bob Ellis	3	21
Bob Ellis (Big 12) (1996–2001)
1997	Bob Ellis	8	13
1998	Bob Ellis	5	X
1999	Bob Ellis	7	X
2000	Bob Ellis	5	X
2001	Bob Ellis	6	X
JT Higgins (SEC) (2001–2020)
2002	JT Higgins	9	X
2003	JT Higgins	4	X
2004	JT Higgins	10	14
2005	JT Higgins	5	26
2006	JT Higgins	3	14
2007	JT Higgins	2	X
2008	JT Higgins	4	12th
2009	JT Higgins	3	1
2010	JT Higgins	2	13
2011	JT Higgins	2	9
2012	JT Higgins	1	14
2013	JT Higgins	4	T6
2014	JT Higgins	T9	29
2015	JT Higgins	10	X
2016	JT Higgins	2	X
2017	JT Higgins	2	X
2018	JT Higgins	T5	T5
2019	JT Higgins	T3	T5
2020	JT Higgins	Cancelled due to COVID-19 pandemic	
Brian Kortan (SEC) (2020–Present)
2021	Brian Kortan	T3	X
2022	Brian Kortan	T3	16
2023	Brian Kortan	T3	13
2024	Brian Kortan	T3	T20
2025	Brian Kortan	2	11
2026	Brian Kortan	T5	25

== Individual honors ==
=== All-Americans ===
- Since 1958

Player	Team	Year
Bobby Nichols	Third Team	1958
Eugene Byrd	Honorable Mention	1963
Lee McDowell	Honorable Mention	1967
David Ogrin	Honorable Mention	1977
David Ogrin	Third Team	1978
David Ogrin	Third Team	1979
David Ogrin	Third Team	1980
Monte Shauer	Honorable Mention	1977
Richard Cromwell	Honorable Mention	1978
Richard Cromwell	Second Team	1980
Steve Bowman	Honorable Mention	1979
Brad Jones	Third Team	1981
Danny Briggs	Honorable Mention	1981
Danny Briggs	Second Team	1982
Danny Briggs	Honorable Mention	1983
Gary Krueger	Honorable Mention	1982
Gary Krueger	Honorable Mention	1983
Paul Oglesby	Honorable Mention	1983
Philip Parkin	First Team	1984
Jorge Coghlan	Honorable Mention	1984
Paul Mayo	Honorable Mention	1985
Jeff Maggert	Third Team	1986
Roy Mackenzie	Honorable Mention	1987
Roy Mackenzie	Honorable Mention	1989
Neil Hickerson	Honorable Mention	1988
Marco Gortana	Second Team	1993
Anthony Rodriguez	Honorable Mention	1994
Anthony Rodriguez	First Team	1995
Dru Fenimore	Honorable Mention	1996
Miguel del Angel	Honorable Mention	1997
Andrew Parr	Honorable Mention	2006
Bronson Burgoon	Third Team	2007
Bronson Burgoon	Second Team	2009
Nacho Elvira	Honorable Mention	2008
Nacho Elvira	Third Team	2011
Conrad Shindler	Honorable Mention	2009
Andrea Pavan	First Team	2010
Cameron Peck	Honorable Mention	2010
Cameron Peck	Honorable Mention	2011
Cameron Peck	Honorable Mention	2012
Jordan Russell	Honorable Mention	2010
Jordan Russell	Second Team	2011
Ty Dunlap	Honorable Mention	2013
Ben Crancer	Honorable Mention	2014
Cameron Champ	Second Team	2017
Chandler Phillips	Third Team	2017
Chandler Phillips	First Team	2018
Chandler Phillips	Second Team	2019
Brandon Smith	Honorable Mention	2018
William Paysse	Honorable Mention	2020
Walker Lee	Third Team	2020
Walker Lee	Third Team	2022
Sam Bennett	Honorable Mention	2020
Sam Bennett	First Team	2021
Sam Bennett	First Team	2022
Phichaksn Maichon	Honorable Mention	2023
Phichaksn Maichon	Third Team	2024
Phichaksn Maichon	Second Team	2025
Daniel Rodrigues	Honorable Mention	2023
Daniel Rodrigues	Honorable Mention	2024
Wheaton Ennis	Third Team	2026

== See also ==
- Texas A&M Aggies women's golf
