= Texas Longhorns men's golf =

College golf team

- Founded: 1927
- University: University of Texas at Austin
- Conference: SEC
- Athletic director: Chris Del Conte
- Head coach: John Fields (27th season)
- Location: Austin, Texas
- Course: University of Texas Golf Club; Par: 71; Yards: 7,412
- Nickname: Longhorns
- Colors: Burnt Orange and White

NCAA champions
- 1971, 1972, 2012, 2022

NCAA individual champions
- Ed White (1935); Ben Crenshaw (1971, 1972, 1973); Tom Kite (1972); Justin Leonard (1994)

NCAA runner-up
- 1949, 1983, 1989, 1994, 2016, 2019

NCAA match play
- 2012, 2013, 2015, 2016, 2018, 2019, 2022, 2025

NCAA Championship appearances
- 1933, 1934, 1939, 1940, 1941, 1947, 1948, 1949, 1950, 1951, 1952, 1953, 1954, 1955, 1957, 1960, 1961, 1963, 1964, 1965, 1966, 1967, 1968, 1969, 1970, 1971, 1972, 1973, 1974, 1975, 1976, 1980, 1981, 1982, 1983, 1984, 1985, 1986, 1987, 1988, 1989, 1990, 1991, 1992, 1993, 1994, 1995, 1996, 2000, 2002, 2003, 2004, 2005, 2007, 2008, 2009, 2010, 2011, 2012, 2013, 2014, 2015, 2016, 2017, 2018, 2019, 2022, 2023, 2024, 2025, 2026

Conference champions
- SWC; 1927, 1928, 1932, 1933, 1934, 1935, 1936, 1937, 1938, 1940, 1941, 1942, 1943, 1944, 1945, 1946, 1947, 1949, 1950, 1951, 1952, 1954, 1964, 1965, 1968, 1970, 1972, 1973, 1974, 1975, 1981, 1983, 1989, 1990, 1991, 1992, 1993, 1994, 1995 Big 12; 2002, 2003, 2004, 2013, 2014, 2015, 2016, 2017, 2024

Individual conference champions
- SWC; Gib Payne (1928); Ed White (1933, 1934, 1935); Bill Welch (1936, 1937); Buck Luce (1940); Leonard Spitzer (1941); John Russell (1942); Bill Roden (1943); Frank Hoover (1944); Joe Ruby (1945); Hugh Dahlberg (1946); Ed Hopkins (1947); Bob Watson (1948, 1949); Wes Ellis (1952); Julian Oates (1953); Joe Golden (1954); Terry Dill (1960); Pat Thompson (1964); Randy Geiselman (1965); Mason Adkins (1966); Rik Massengale (1969); Dean Overturf (1970); Ben Crenshaw (1972, 1973); Lance Ten Broeck (1975); Brandel Chamblee (1983); Justin Leonard (1991, 1992, 1993, 1994) Big 12; David Gossett (1999); Jason Hartwick (2004); Matt Rosenfeld (2006); Brandon Stone (2013); Scottie Scheffler (2015); Doug Ghim (2018); Cole Hammer (2021)

The Texas Longhorns men's golf team represents the University of Texas at Austin in NCAA Division I intercollegiate men's golf competition. The Longhorns competed in the Big 12 Conference through the 2024 season and moved to the Southeastern Conference (SEC) on July 1, 2024.

The program has a strong golf tradition, dating back to its first season in 1927. Since then the Longhorns have won national titles back-to-back in 1971 and 1972, again in 2012 and the most recent in 2022, and finished runner-up six other times (1949, 1983, 1989, 1994, 2016, 2019). Individual national champions were Ed White (1935), Ben Crenshaw (1971, 1972, and 1973), Tom Kite (1972), and Justin Leonard (1994).

Longhorns who have won the U.S. Amateur include Justin Leonard and David Gossett. Longhorn golfers have gone on to win 12 major championships as professionals: Crenshaw (2), Kite (1), Leonard (1), Mark Brooks (1), Jordan Spieth (3), and Scottie Scheffler (4). Both Spieth and Scheffler have also reached the number one position in the Official World Golf Ranking.

Legendary golf instructor Harvey Penick was a long-time coach at Texas. The team has been coached by John Fields since 1998.

== Yearly record ==
Season	Coach	Conference	NCAA
Southwest Conference
1927	Tom Penick	1st	
1928	Tom Penick	1st	
1929	Tom Penick	3rd	
1930	Tom Penick	2nd	
1931	Harvey Penick	3rd	
1932	Harvey Penick	1st	
1933	Harvey Penick	1st	4th
1934	Harvey Penick	1st	5th
1935	Harvey Penick	1st	
1936	Harvey Penick	1st	
1937	Harvey Penick	1st	
1938	Harvey Penick	1st	
1939	Harvey Penick	2nd	14th
1940	Harvey Penick	1st	17th
1941	Harvey Penick	1st	6th
1942	Harvey Penick	1st	
1943	Harvey Penick	1st	
1944	Harvey Penick	1st	
1945	Harvey Penick	1st	
1946	Harvey Penick	1st	
1947	Harvey Penick	1st	30th
1948	Harvey Penick	2nd	12th
1949	Harvey Penick	1st	2nd
1950	Harvey Penick	1st	11th
1951	Harvey Penick	1st	13th
1952	Harvey Penick	1st	4th
1953	Harvey Penick	2nd	6th
1954	Harvey Penick	1st	8th
1955	Harvey Penick	6th	23rd
1956	Harvey Penick	3rd	
1957	Harvey Penick	3rd	18th
1958	Harvey Penick	5th	
1959	Harvey Penick	5th	
1960	Harvey Penick	6th	34th
1961	Harvey Penick	6th	20th
1962	Harvey Penick	4th	
1963	Harvey Penick	3rd	6th
1964	George Hannon	1st	27th
1965	George Hannon	1st	T-17th
1966	George Hannon	3rd	T-27th
1967	George Hannon	3rd	T-13th
1968	George Hannon	1st	T-4th
1969	George Hannon	2nd	8th
1970	George Hannon	1st	T-6th
1971	George Hannon	DNP	1st
1972	George Hannon	1st	1st
1973	George Hannon	1st	3rd
1974	George Hannon	T-1st	15th
1975	George Hannon	T-1st	T-17th
1976	George Hannon	2nd	6th
1977	George Hannon	4th	
1978	George Hannon	2nd	
1979	George Hannon	T-3rd	
1980	George Hannon	3rd	T-12th
1981	George Hannon	1st	16th
1982	Jimmy Clayton	3rd	7th
1983	Jimmy Clayton	1st	2nd
1984	Jimmy Clayton	3rd	T-16th
1985	Jimmy Clayton	3rd	5th
1986	Jimmy Clayton	5th	17th
1987	Jimmy Clayton	4th	20th
1988	Jimmy Clayton	2nd	11th
1989	Jimmy Clayton	1st	2nd
1990	Jimmy Clayton	1st	22nd
1991	Jimmy Clayton	1st	T-9th
1992	Jimmy Clayton	1st	6th
1993	Jimmy Clayton	1st	5th
1994	Jimmy Clayton	1st	2nd
1995	Jimmy Clayton	1st	3rd
1996	Jimmy Clayton	5th	13th
Big 12 Conference
1997	Jimmy Clayton	2nd	
1998	John Fields	2nd	
1999	John Fields	3rd	
2000	John Fields	4th	5th
2001	John Fields	T-2nd	
2002	John Fields	1st	T-3rd
2003	John Fields	1st	T-9th
2004	John Fields	1st	4th
2005	John Fields	4th	23rd
2006	John Fields	2nd	
2007	John Fields	4th	T-11th
2008	John Fields	2nd	19th
2009	John Fields	8th	26th
2010	John Fields	3rd	T-21st
2011	John Fields	3rd	T-12th
2012	John Fields	2nd	1st
2013	John Fields	1st	5th
2014	John Fields	1st	13th
2015	John Fields	1st	T-5th
2016	John Fields	1st	2nd
2017	John Fields	1st	12th
2018	John Fields	2nd	T-5th
2019	John Fields	T-3rd	2nd
2020	John Fields	Season canceled due to the Coronavirus Pandemic	
2021	John Fields	3rd	T-25th
2022	John Fields	3rd	1st
2023	John Fields	4th	19th
2024	John Fields	1st	13th
Southeastern Conference
2025	John Fields	T-7th	T-5th
2026	John Fields	3rd	TBD
Total		SWC: 39; Big 12: 9 SEC: 0	4

== Individual champions ==
=== NCAA ===
Texas has had 4 individuals claim the NCAA Individual Championship on 5 occasions, with a tie in 1972.

Year	Name
1935	Ed White
1971	Ben Crenshaw
1972	Ben Crenshaw, Tom Kite
1973	Ben Crenshaw
1994	Justin Leonard

=== Conference ===
Texas has had 32 separate golfers win a conference title on 40 separate occasions, 3 of which were a shared title.

Southwest Conference
Year	Name
1928	Gib Payne
1933	Ed White
1934	Ed White
1935	Ed White
1936	Bill Welch
1937	Bill Welch
1940	Buck Luce
1941	Leonard Spitzer
1942	John Russell
1943	Bill Roden
1944	Frank Hoover
1945	Joe Ruby
1946	Hugh Dahlberg
1947	Ed Hopkins
1948	Bob Watson
1949	Bob Watson
1952	Wes Ellis
1953	Julian Oates
1954	Joe Golden
1960	Terry Dill (tie)
1964	Pat Thompson
1965	Randy Geiselman
1966	Mason Adkins
1969	Rik Massengale
1970	Dean Overturf
1972	Ben Crenshaw
1973	Ben Crenshaw
1975	Lance Ten Broeck
1983	Brandel Chamblee
1991	Justin Leonard
1992	Justin Leonard (tie)
1993	Justin Leonard
1994	Justin Leonard

Big 12 Conference
Year	Name
1999	David Gossett
2004	Jason Hartwick
2006	Matt Rosenfeld
2013	Brandon Stone
2015	Scottie Scheffler
2018	Doug Ghim (tie)
2021	Cole Hammer

== National honors ==
U.S. Amateur champions
- 1992 – Justin Leonard
- 1999 – David Gossett

U.S. Junior Amateur champions
- 2000 – Matt Rosenfeld
- 2009 – Jordan Spieth
- 2011 – Jordan Spieth

Western Amateur champions
- 1968 – Rik Massengale
- 1973 – Ben Crenshaw
- 1992 – Justin Leonard
- 1993 – Justin Leonard
- 2002 – John Klauk
- 2018 – Cole Hammer

Walker Cup selections
- 1936 – Ed White
- 1971 – Tom Kite
- 1993 – Justin Leonard
- 1997 – Brad Elder
- 1999 – David Gossett
- 2011 – Jordan Spieth
- 2015 – Beau Hossler
- 2017 – Doug Ghim, Scottie Scheffler

Arnold Palmer Cup selections
- 1997 – Brad Elder
- 2002 – John Klauk
- 2003 – Jason Hartwick
- 2004 – Jason Hartwick
- 2005 – Matt Rosenfeld
- 2015 – Beau Hossler
- 2016 – Doug Ghim
- 2017 – Doug Ghim
- 2018 – Cole Hammer

Fred Haskins Award
- 1971 – Ben Crenshaw
- 1972 – Ben Crenshaw
- 1973 – Ben Crenshaw
- 1987 – Bob Estes
- 1994 – Justin Leonard
- 1997 – Brad Elder
- 2016 – Beau Hossler

Phil Mickelson Award
- 2013 – Brandon Stone
- 2015 – Scottie Scheffler

Byron Nelson Award
- 2012 – Dylan Frittelli

Jack Nicklaus Award
- 1988 – Bob Estes
- 1994 – Justin Leonard
- 1997 – Brad Elder
- 2015 – Beau Hossler

Ben Hogan Award
- 1997 – Jeff Fahrenbruch
- 2018 – Doug Ghim

Arnold Palmer Award
- 1994 – Justin Leonard

COSIDA Academic All-American
- 1996 – Jeff Fahrenbruch (1st team)
- 1997 – Jeff Fahrenbruch (2nd team)
- 2012 – Dylan Frittelli (3rd team)

== See also ==
- Texas Longhorns women's golf
