= San Diego State Aztecs men's golf =

American university golf team

- University: San Diego State University
- Conference: Pac-12
- Head coach: Ryan Donovan (since 2004 season)
- Location: San Diego, California
- Nickname: Aztecs
- Colors: Scarlet and black

NCAA Championship appearances
- 1950, 1960, 1962, 1965, 1966, 1967, 1970, 1971, 1972, 1974, 1975, 1976, 1977, 1978, 1979, 1980, 1981, 1982, 1983, 1984, 1999, 2003, 2005, 2008, 2011, 2012, 2015, 2016

Conference champions
- Mountain West; 2011, 2012, 2015, 2022, 2023, 2024

The San Diego State Aztecs men's golf team is the men's golf program that represents San Diego State University (SDSU). The Aztecs compete in NCAA Division I as a member of the Pac-12 Conference.

The Aztecs have reached the NCAA Division I men's golf championship 28 times, a record for championship berths for San Diego State's athletic programs.

== Postseason results ==
Year	Finish	Score
1950	10th	606
1960	14th	625
1962	15th	637
1965	24th	620
1966	6th	604
1967	23rd	613
1970	16th	1,230
1971	20th	585
1972	16th	603
1974	17th	606
1975	19th	606
1976	18th	1,205
1977	15th	1,248
1978	12th	1,190
1979	26th	943
1980	22nd	917
1981	21st	895
1982	14th	1,178
1983	23rd	909
1984	24th	889
1999	29th	628
2003	30th	965
2005	23rd	893
2008	14th	1,222
2011	16th	898
2012	5th	871
2015	15th	1,193
2017	25th	872

== See also ==
- Aztec Hall of Fame
