= Iowa State Cyclones men's golf =

Iowa State Cyclones golf
- Founded: 1935; 91 years ago
- University: Iowa State University
- Conference: Big 12
- Head coach: Andrew Tank (7th season)
- Location: Ames, Iowa
- Course: The Harvester Club; Par: 72; Yards: 7463
- Nickname: Cyclones
- Colors: Cardinal and gold

NCAA Championship appearances
- 1939, 1940, 1947, 1949, 1952, 1953, 1991, 1992, 1993, 1995, 1996, 1997, 1999, 2012, 2014, 2015, 2017, 2018

Conference champions
- 1940, 1947, 1953

Individual conference champions
- Billy Hall (1939), Max Hall (1941), Dan Molyneaux (1953)

The Iowa State Cyclones men's golf team represents Iowa State University (ISU) and competes in the Big 12 Conference of NCAA Division I. The team is coached by Andrew Tank, he is in his 7th year at Iowa State. The Cyclones play their home meets at Veenker Memorial Golf Course on Iowa State's campus.

== History ==
The Iowa State men's golf team first got it start in 1923 in the Missouri Valley Intercollegiate Athletic Association conference. After three years the MVIAA dropped men's golf as a sponsored sport. When the Big Six sponsored golf in 1935, Iowa State joined once again. The early Cyclone squad were led by Coach Hugo Otopalik who split his time between Iowa State golf and wrestling. As a pioneer in the field of collegiate golf, OtopaliK was tournament director at the first NCAA golf championship held at the Wakonda Country Club in Des Moines in 1939 and was the first chairman of the NCAA golf committee. His best squads were headlined by brothers Billy and Max Hall; culminating with Big Six conference titles for Billy and Max in 1939 and 1941 respectively and a seventh-place finish in the 1940 NCAA Championship.

After struggling to find success for almost half a century the Cyclones were able to reach the NCAA Regionals in seven out of nine years from 1991 to 1999. Several of those 1990s were led by Jason Knutzon who would go on to play in both the U.S. Open and The Open Championship.

Under current head coach, Andrew Tank, Iowa State is experiencing success both individually and as a team. Nate McCoy finished tied for 29th at the 2012 NCAA Championship, the highest individual finish in program history. In 2014 the team would reach the NCAA Finals for the first time in over 50 years, they finished tied for 25th

== Record ==
Record by Year
Year	Conference	Finish	National Tournament	Finish
1923	MVIAA	4th		
1924	MVIAA	4th		
1925	MVIAA	4th		
1926	Golf Dropped by MVIAA			
1927	Golf Dropped by MVIAA			
1928	Golf Dropped by MVIAA			
1929	Golf Dropped by MVIAA			
1930	Golf Dropped by MVIAA			
1931	Golf Dropped by MVIAA			
1932	Golf Dropped by MVIAA			
1933	Golf Dropped by MVIAA			
1934	Golf Dropped by MVIAA			
1935	Big Six	4th		
1936	Big Six	4th		
1937	Big Six	4th		
1938	Big Six	3rd		
1939	Big Six	4th	NCAA Finals	4th
1940	Big Six	1st	NCAA Finals	8th
1941	Big Six	2nd		
1942	No Meet Due to WWII			
1943	No Meet Due to WWII			
1944	No Meet Due to WWII			
1945	No Meet Due to WWII			
1946	Big Six	4th		
1947	Big Six	1st	NCAA Finals	34th
1948	Big Seven	4th		
1949	Big Seven	3rd	NCAA Finals	12th
1950	Big Seven	6th		
1951	Big Seven	7th		
1952	Big Seven	5th	NCAA Finals	22nd
1953	Big Seven	1st	NCAA Finals	19th
1954	Big Seven	4th		
1955	Big Seven	3rd		
1956	Big Seven	6th		
1957	Big Eight	5th		
1958	Big Eight	4th		
1959	Big Eight	8th		
1960	Big Eight	3rd		
1961	Big Eight	5th		
1962	Big Eight	7th		
1963	Big Eight	8th		
1964	Big Eight	7th		
1965	Big Eight	7th		
1966	Big Eight	8th		
1967	Big Eight	6th		
1968	Big Eight	7th		
1969	Big Eight	3rd		
1970	Big Eight	8th		
1971	Big Eight	7th		
1972	Big Eight	6th		
1973	Big Eight	8th		
1974	Big Eight	5th		

Record by Year
Year	Conference	Finish	National Tournament	Finish
1975	Big Eight	5th		
1976	Big Eight	5th		
1977	Big Eight	8th		
1978	Big Eight	6th		
1979	Big Eight	6th		
1980	Big Eight	6th		
1981	Big Eight	7th		
1982	Big Eight	7th		
1983	Big Eight	7th		
1984	Big Eight	6th		
1985	Big Eight	DNP		
1986	Big Eight	7th		
1987	Big Eight	6th		
1988	Big Eight	7th		
1989	Big Eight	7th		
1990	Big Eight	4th		
1991	Big Eight	4th	NCAA Regional	19th
1992	Big Eight	3rd	NCAA Regional	T-17th
1993	Big Eight	5th	NCAA Regional	19th
1994	Big Eight	8th		
1995	Big Eight	4th	NCAA Regional	20th
1996	Big Eight	4th	NCAA Regional	15th
1997	Big 12	3rd	NCAA Regional	14th
1998	Big 12	10th		
1999	Big 12	T-8th	NCAA Regional	20th
2000	Big 12	11th		
2001	Big 12	11th		
2002	Big 12	11th		
2003	Big 12	12th		
2004	Big 12	8th		
2005	Big 12	9th		
2006	Big 12	12th		
2007	Big 12	12th		
2008	Big 12	9th		
2009	Big 12	12th		
2010	Big 12	10th		
2011	Big 12	T-11th		
2012	Big 12	7th	NCAA Regional	T-9th
2013	Big 12	9th		
2014	Big 12	4th	NCAA Finals	T-25th
2015	Big 12	4th	NCAA Regional	8th
2016	Big 12	9th		
2017	Big 12	9th	NCAA Finals	T-18th
2018	Big 12	4th	NCAA Finals	T-19th

== Individual honors ==
NCAA Appearances
Year	Name	Tournament	Finish
1969	John Benda	NCAA Finals	CUT
1974	Dick Stuntz	NCAA Finals	CUT
1980	Clay Davis	NCAA Finals	CUT
1990	Jim Webb	NCAA Regional	T-61st
2004	Jeremy Lyons	NCAA Regional	T-17th
2008	Chris Baker	NCAA Regional	T-12th
2010	Ben Herrera	NCAA Regional	T-16th
2012	Nate McCoy	NCAA Finals	T-29th
2013	Scott Fernandez	NCAA Regional	T-13th
2016	Nick Voke	NCAA Regional	T-22nd

All-America Team
Year	Name
2008	Chris Baker (HM)
2012	Nate McCoy (HM)
2013	Scott Fernandez (2nd)

PING All-Region Team
Year	Name
2008	Chris Baker
2012	Nate McCoy
2013	Scott Fernandez
2014	Scott Fernandez
2015	Scott Fernandez
2016	Nick Voke

All-Conference Selections
Year	Name
1969	John Benda
1974	Dick Stuntz
1979	Dana Kain
1980	Clay Davis
1991	Pat McCormick
1992	Rich Balla
1993	Mark Hankins
1995	Travis Korver
1997	Jason Knutzon
1997	Donnie Teeter
1998	Matt Lewis
2005	Chris Baker
2008	Chris Baker
2012	Nate McCoy
2013	Scott Fernandez
2014	Sam Daley
2014	Nick Voke
2014	Ruben Sondjaja
2015	Scott Fernandez
2015	Nick Voke
2016	Nick Voke

== Veenker Memorial Golf Course ==
Named for George F. Veenker, head football coach at Iowa State from 1931 to 1936. He was also athletic director from 1933 until 1945. The golf course was completed in 1938 and given its current name in 1959.

The 6,543-yard, par-72, George Veenker Memorial Golf Course is located just two blocks north of the Iowa State campus. The 18-hole course was constructed in 1938 from the design of golf course architect, Perry Maxwell (re-designer of the seventh and 10th holes at Augusta National Golf Club in 1937). The golf course was built with WPA and Athletic Council funds, and cost $122,373. The course hosted the conference championships in 1982 and 1989, two regional AIAW championships, and hosts the annual Iowa Masters Championship. It also hosted the 1949 NCAA national championship, in which Arnold Palmer was a participant.

The team practices at the newly opened $2 million Golf Performance Center located three miles from campus. The 16-acre facility was designed by world renowned architech Keith Foster to be used exclusively by the Iowa State men's and women's golf team.
