= 1941 NCAA golf championship =

1941 NCAA Golf Championship
Tournament information
- Location: Columbus, Ohio, U.S.
- Course: Ohio State University Golf Club

Statistics
- Field: 19 teams

Champion
- Team: Stanford (2); Individual: Earl Stewart (LSU)
- Team: 580

The 1941 NCAA Golf Championship was the third annual NCAA-sanctioned golf tournament to determine the individual and team national champions of men's collegiate golf in the United States. The tournament was held at the Ohio State University Golf Club in Columbus, Ohio.

Stanford won the team championship, the second title for the Indians. Earl Stewart from LSU captured the individual title.

== Team results ==
| Rank | Team | Score |
|---|---|---|
| 1 | Stanford | 580 |
| 2 | LSU (DC) | 599 |
| 3 | Duke | 603 |
| 4 | Illinois | 606 |
| 5 | Ohio State (H) | 609 |
| 6 | Texas | 611 |
| T7 | Michigan State College | 615 |
| T7 | Northwestern | 615 |
| 9 | Notre Dame | 616 |
| 10 | Minnesota | 618 |

- Note: Top 10 only
- DC = Defending champions
- H = Hosts
