= 2018 NCAA Division I men's golf championship =

2018 NCAA Division I Men's Golf Championship
Tournament information
- Dates: May 25–30, 2018
- Location: Stillwater, Oklahoma, U.S. 36°06′09″N 97°11′07″W
- Course: Karsten Creek

Statistics
- Par: 72
- Length: 7,460 yards (6,820 m)
- Field: 156 players, 30 teams

Champion
- Team: Oklahoma State; Individual: Broc Everett (Augusta)
- Team: 5–0 (def. Alabama); Individual: 281 (−7)

Location map
- Location in Oklahoma

The 2018 NCAA Division I Men's Golf Championship was the 80th annual tournament to determine the national champions of NCAA Division I men's golf. It was contested from May 25 to 30 at the Karsten Creek in Stillwater, Oklahoma and hosted by Oklahoma State.

Oklahoma State won its 11th team championship, defeating Alabama 5–0 in the finals. Broc Everett of Augusta won the individual championship in a sudden-death playoff over Brandon Mancheno of Auburn.

== Qualifying ==
- The five teams with the lowest team scores qualified from each of the six regional tournaments for both the team and individual national championships.
- The lowest scoring individual not affiliated with one of the qualified teams in their regional also qualified for the individual national championship.

=== Regional tournaments ===
Regional name	Golf course	Location	Qualified teams	Additionally qualified
Reunion Regional	Reunion Resort, Watson Course	Kissimmee, Florida	UCF, Florida, Kent State, North Carolina, Vanderbilt	George Cunningham, Arizona
Raleigh Regional	Lonnie Poole Golf Course	Raleigh, North Carolina	Augusta, Arizona State, Duke, NC State, Texas	Pontus Nyholm, Campbell
Columbus Regional	OSU Golf Club, Scarlet Course	Columbus, Ohio	Illinois, Northwestern, Oklahoma State, Texas Tech, UNLV	Kyle Mueller, Michigan
Norman Regional	Jimmie Austin OU Golf Club	Norman, Oklahoma	Arkansas, Auburn, BYU, North Florida, Oklahoma	Joshua McCarthy, Pepperdine
Pacific Regional	The Reserve at Spanos Park	Stockton, California	Alabama, Iowa State, Kansas, Oregon, Stanford	Charles Corner, UTEP
Bryan Regional	Traditions Club	Bryan, Texas	Baylor, Clemson, Kentucky, Texas A&M, UCLA	Braden Thornberry, Ole Miss

== Team competition ==
=== Leaderboard ===
After 54 holes, the field of 30 teams was cut to the top 15.

Place	Team	Round 1	Round 2	Round 3	Round 4	Total	To par
1	Oklahoma State	287	285	285	295	1152	E
2	Duke	291	287	276	306	1160	+8
3	Texas Tech	284	287	290	300	1161	+9
4	Oklahoma	285	293	290	295	1163	+11
5	Auburn	300	280	290	297	1167	+15
T6	Alabama	294	279	301	294	1168	+16
T6	Texas	289	291	295	293	1168	+16
8	Texas A&M	293	289	289	298	1169	+17
9	Vanderbilt	287	292	287	304	1170	+18
10	Kent State	288	291	293	299	1171	+19
11	Illinois	289	291	301	295	1176	+24
12	Arkansas	296	289	291	303	1179	+27
T13	Arizona State	296	289	295	302	1182	+30
T13	Clemson	285	294	299	304	1182	+30
15	North Carolina	296	289	297	305	1187	+35

Remaining teams: Northwestern (884), Stanford (884), Florida (886), Iowa State (891), UNLV (891), Kentucky (892), UCLA (892), Kansas (894), BYU (897), NC State (897), UCF (897), Oregon (899), North Florida (902), Augusta (904), Baylor (910).

=== Match play bracket ===
The eight teams with the lowest total scores advanced to the match play bracket.

Quarterfinals; May 29, morning
1	Oklahoma State	3.5
8	Texas A&M	1.5
4	Oklahoma	2
5	Auburn	3
3	Texas Tech	2
6	Alabama	3
2	Duke	3
7	Texas	2

Semifinals; May 29, afternoon
1	Oklahoma State	3
5	Auburn	2
6	Alabama	5
2	Duke	0

Final; May 30
1	Oklahoma State	5
6	Alabama	0

== Individual competition ==
The field was cut after 54 holes to the top 15 teams and the top nine individuals not on a top 15 team. These 84 players competed for the individual championship.

Place	Player	University	Score	To par
1	Broc Everett^	Augusta	70-70-70-71=281	−7
2	Brandon Mancheno	Auburn	72-66-71-72=281	−7
3	Doug Ghim	Texas	71-69-70-72=282	−6
T4	Dylan Meyer	Illinois	72-69-73-69=283	−5
T4	Iván Ramírez	Texas Tech	67-72-71-73=283	−5
6	Scottie Scheffler	Texas	67-74-70-73=284	−4
T7	Bryson Nimmer	Clemson	64-75-68-78=285	−3
T7	Matthew Wolff	Oklahoma State	71-73-69-72=285	−3
T9	John Augenstein	Vanderbilt	70-69-73-74=286	−2
T9	Philip Knowles	North Florida	73-73-68-72=286	−2

^ Everett won on the first hole of a sudden-death playoff.
