= 1976 NCAA Division I golf championship =

1976 NCAA Division I Golf Championship
Tournament information
- Location: Albuquerque, New Mexico, U.S. 35.039333°N 106.610778°W
- Courses: University of New Mexico Golf Course, Championship Course

Statistics
- Field: 29 teams

Champion
- Team: Oklahoma State (1st title); Individual: Scott Simpson, USC

Location map
- Location in the United States Location in New Mexico

The 1976 NCAA Division I Golf Championship was the 38th annual NCAA-sanctioned golf tournament to determine the individual and team national champions of men's collegiate golf at the University Division level in the United States.

The tournament was held at the University of New Mexico Golf Course in Albuquerque, New Mexico.

Oklahoma State won the team championship, the Cowboys' first NCAA title.

Future U.S. Open champion Scott Simpson, from USC, won the individual title.

== Individual results ==
=== Individual champion ===
- Scott Simpson, USC

== Team results ==
Rank	Team	Score
1	Oklahoma State	1,166
2	BYU	1,173
3	Houston	1,174
4	Wake Forest (DC)	1,175
5	New Mexico	1,176
6	Texas	1,183
T7	East Tennessee State	1,184
T7	USC	1,184
9	Maryland	1,186
10	Oregon	1,194
T11	Arizona State	1,196
T11	Ohio State	1,196
13	San Jose State	1,197
14	Georgia	1,198
T15	Georgia Southern	1,203
T15	Texas Tech	1,203
17	Marshall	1,204
18	San Diego State	1,205
19	New Mexico State	1,211
T20	Oklahoma	1,212
T20	Stanford	1,212
22	North Texas State	1,213
23	Indiana	1,215
24	Northern Illinois	1,217
T25	Temple	1,219
T25	Weber State	1,219
27	LSU	1,225
28	Auburn	1,226
29	Massachusetts	1,257

- DC = Defending champions
- Debut appearance
