= 2019 NCAA Division I men's golf championship =

American golf tournament

2019 NCAA Division I Men's Golf Championship
Tournament information
- Dates: May 24–29, 2019
- Location: Fayetteville, Arkansas, U.S. 36.13288°N 94.20128°W
- Course: Blessings Golf Club

Statistics
- Field: 156 players, 30 teams

Champion
- Team: Stanford; Individual: Matthew Wolff (Oklahoma State)
- Team: 3–2 (def. Texas); Individual: 278 (−10)

Location map
- Location in Arkansas

The 2019 NCAA Division I Men's Golf Championship was the 81st annual tournament to determine the national champions of NCAA Division I men's golf. It was contested from May 24 to 29 at the Blessings Golf Club in Fayetteville, Arkansas and hosted by the University of Arkansas.

Stanford won its 9th team title with at 3–2 win over Texas in the finals. Matthew Wolff of Oklahoma State won the individual title by five strokes.

== Qualifying ==
- The five teams with the lowest team scores qualified from each of the six regional tournaments for both the team and individual national championships.
- The lowest scoring individual not affiliated with one of the qualified teams in their regional also qualified for the individual national championship.

=== Regional tournaments ===
Regional name	Golf course	Location	Qualified teams	Additionally qualified
Myrtle Beach Regional	TPC Myrtle Beach	Murrells Inlet, South Carolina	California, Illinois, Ohio State, UNLV, Wake Forest	Edwin Yi, Oregon
Athens Regional	University of Georgia Golf Course	Athens, Georgia	Duke, Georgia, Liberty, Vanderbilt, SMU	Billy Tom Sargent, Western Kentucky
Louisville Regional	University of Louisville Golf Club	Simpsonville, Kentucky	Auburn, Baylor, Louisville, North Florida, Oklahoma State	Tripp Kinney, Iowa State
Stanford Regional	Stanford Golf Course	Stanford, California	Arizona State, Georgia Southern, LSU, North Carolina, Stanford	Kyler Dunkle, Utah
Austin Regional	University of Texas Golf Club	Austin, Texas	Clemson, Pepperdine, Southern California, TCU, Texas	Julián Périco, Arkansas
Washington Regional	Palouse Ridge Golf Club	Pullman, Washington	BYU, Georgia Tech, Oklahoma, South Carolina, Texas A&M	Zach Smith, UC Santa Barbara

== Team competition ==
=== Leaderboard ===
After 54 holes, the field of 30 teams was cut to the top 15.

Place	Team	Round 1	Round 2	Round 3	Round 4	Total	To par
1	Oklahoma State	290	276	286	284	1136	−16
2	Vanderbilt	307	288	287	285	1167	+15
3	Wake Forest	296	297	288	291	1172	+20
T4	Oklahoma	298	290	289	303	1180	+28
T4	Texas	305	287	288	300	1180	+28
6	Stanford	291	287	299	312	1189	+37
7	Texas A&M	296	287	301	308	1192	+40
T8	SMU	308	293	292	303	1196	+44
T8	Clemson	302	292	298	304	1196	+44
10	California	292	301	306	298	1197	+45
11	Pepperdine	312	291	293	303	1199	+47
12	Auburn	292	294	312	302	1200	+48
13	Ohio State	297	296	302	306	1201	+49
14	Southern California	304	304	292	302	1202	+50
15	TCU	311	295	288	311	1205	+53

SMU defeated Clemson in a sudden-death playoff to advance to match play.

Remaining teams: Arizona State (901), South Carolina (902), Georgia Tech (903), North Carolina (904), Liberty (906), UNLV (906), LSU (907), North Florida (907), Georgia (911), Duke (912), Georgia Southern (913), Baylor (915), Illinois (915), Louisville (932), BYU (938).

=== Match play bracket ===
The eight teams with the lowest total scores advanced to the match play bracket.

Quarterfinals; May 28, morning
1	Oklahoma State	4
8	SMU	1
4	Oklahoma	2
5	Texas	3
3	Wake Forest	2
6	Stanford	3
2	Vanderbilt	3
7	Texas A&M	2

Semifinals; May 28, afternoon
1	Oklahoma State	2
5	Texas	3
6	Stanford	3
2	Vanderbilt	2

Final; May 29
5	Texas	2
6	Stanford	3

== Individual competition ==
The field was cut after 54 holes to the top 15 teams and the top nine individuals not on a top 15 team. These 84 players competed for the individual championship.

Place	Player	University	Score	To par
1	Matthew Wolff	Oklahoma State	73-66-70-69=278	−10
2	Steven Fisk	Georgia Southern	76-68-68-71=283	−5
3	Kevin Yu	Arizona State	69-74-70-72=285	−3
T4	Lee Detmer	Wake Forest	72-74-71-69=286	−2
T4	Justin Suh	Southern California	71-75-68-72=286	−2
T6	Collin Morikawa	California	67-72-76-73=288	E
T6	Isaiah Salinda	Stanford	70-70-74-74=288	E
T8	Zach Bauchou	Oklahoma State	73-71-70-75=289	+1
T8	Austin Eckroat	Oklahoma State	69-69-73-78=289	+1
T8	Trent Phillips	Georgia	73-71-77-68=289	+1
