= 1970 NCAA University Division golf championship =

1970 NCAA University Division Golf Championship
Tournament information
- Location: Columbus, Ohio, U.S. 40.031886°N 83.0523498°W
- Course: Ohio State University Golf Club

Statistics
- Field: 16 teams

Champion
- Team: Houston (12th title); Individual: John Mahaffey, Houston

Location map
- Location in the United States Location in Ohio

The 1970 NCAA University Division Golf Championship was the 32nd annual NCAA-sanctioned golf tournament to determine the individual and team national champions of men's collegiate golf in the United States.

The tournament was held at the Ohio State University Golf Club in Columbus, Ohio.

Defending champions Houston won the team title, the Cougars' twelfth NCAA team national title.

== Individual results ==
=== Individual champion ===
- John Mahaffey, Houston

== Team results ==
Rank	Team	Score
1	Houston (DC)	1,172
2	Wake Forest	1,182
3	BYU	1,189
4	Oklahoma State	1,190
5	Cal State Los Angeles	1,196
T6	Ohio State	1,199
T6	Texas	1,199
8	Georgia	1,200
9	Stanford	1,201
10	Purdue	1,202

- Note: Top 10 only
- DC = Defending champions
