= 2022 NCAA Division I men's golf championship =

2022 NCAA Division I Men's Golf Championship
Tournament information
- Dates: May 27 – June 1, 2022
- Location: Scottsdale, Arizona, U.S. 33.4942°N 111.9261°W
- Course: Grayhawk Golf Club
- Organized by: NCAA

Statistics
- Par: 70
- Length: 7,289 yards (6,665 m)
- Field: 156 players, 30 teams

Champion
- Team: Texas Longhorns; Individual: Gordon Sargent (Vanderbilt)
- Team: 3–2 (def. Arizona State); Individual: 280 (E)

Location map
- Location in Arizona

The 2022 NCAA Division I Men's Golf Championship was a golf tournament contested from May 27 – June 1 at the Grayhawk Golf Club in Scottsdale, Arizona. It was the 83rd NCAA Division I Men's Golf Championship. The team championship was won by the Texas Longhorns who won their fourth national championship by defeating the Arizona State Sun Devils in the championship match play round 3–2. The individual national championship was won by Gordon Sargent from Vanderbilt University.

== Regional qualifying tournaments ==
- Five teams qualified from each of the six regional tournaments held around the country May 16–18, 2022.
- The lowest scoring individual not affiliated with one of the qualified teams in their regional also qualified for the individual national championship.

Regional name	Golf course	Location	Host team	Teams advancing	Individual advancing (school)
Palm Beach Gardens Regional	PGA National Resort and Spa	Palm Beach Gardens, Florida	Florida Atlantic	1. Vanderbilt; 2. Florida State; 3. Florida; 4. South Florida; 5. College of Charleston	Zack Byers (Gardner-Webb)
Stockton Regional	The Reserve at Spanos Park	Stockton, California	Pacific	1. Arizona State; 2. Stanford; 3. BYU; 4. Oregon; 5. Liberty	RJ Manke (Washington)
Bryan Regional	Traditions Club	Bryan, Texas	Texas A&M	1. Arizona; 2. Pepperdine; 3. Texas A&M; 4. Georgia; 5. Kansas	Carson Barry (Oregon State)
Columbus Regional	Ohio State University Golf Club	Upper Arlington, Ohio	Ohio State	1. Oklahoma State; 2. Georgia Tech; 3. Ohio State; 4. Arkansas; 5. East Tennessee State	Thomas Giroux (Oakland)
New Haven Regional	Yale Golf Course	New Haven, Connecticut	Yale	1. Wake Forest; 2. North Carolina; 3. Texas Tech; 4. North Florida; 5. Georgia Southern	Adrian Vagberg (VCU)
Norman Regional	Jimmie Austin OU Golf Club	Norman, Oklahoma	Oklahoma	1. Oklahoma; 2. Auburn; 3. Ole Miss; 4. Texas; 5. Utah	Evans Lewis (South Carolina)

== Venue ==
This was the second consecutive NCAA Division I Men's Golf Championship held at the Grayhawk Golf Club in Scottsdale, Arizona. This would have been the third year of a planned three year stretch for Grayhawk hosting both men's and women's NCAA golf championships had the 2020 championship not been cancelled due to the COVID-19 pandemic. In October, 2020, the NCAA announced that Grayhawk would host the 2023 NCAA Division I Women's and Men's Golf Championship.

== Team competition ==
=== Leaderboard ===
- Par, single-round: 280
- Par, total: 1,120
- After 54 holes, the field of 30 teams was cut to the top 15.

Place	Team	Round 1	Round 2	Round 3	Round 4	Total	To par
T1	Vanderbilt	282	282	281	289	1134	+14
T1	Oklahoma	287	275	277	295	1134	+14
T1	North Carolina	288	281	280	285	1134	+14
4	Texas	291	291	278	277	1137	+17
5	Oklahoma State	289	277	277	298	1141	+21
6	Pepperdine	294	282	277	293	1146	+26
7	Arizona State	290	292	277	289	1148	+28
8	Texas Tech	297	287	285	284	1153	+33
9	Arkansas	294	286	286	293	1159	+39
T10	Auburn	285	296	288	291	1160	+40
T10	Florida	300	285	286	289	1160	+40
T12	Georgia	291	292	289	299	1171	+51
T12	Georgia Tech	298	289	290	294	1171	+51
14	Ole Miss	297	287	293	300	1177	+57
15	Oregon	285	300	291	306	1182	+62

- Remaining teams: Texas A&M (879), Kansas (880), Stanford (882), Arizona (883), Wake Forest (883), Florida State (887), BYU (887), Ohio State (893), North Florida (895), Georgia Southern (897), Liberty (898), Utah (904), South Florida (907), East Tennessee State (911), College of Charleston (913)

=== Match play bracket ===
Quarterfinal round May 31
1	Vanderbilt	3
8	Texas Tech	2
4	Texas	3
5	Oklahoma State	2
3	North Carolina	2
6	Pepperdine	3
2	Oklahoma	2
7	Arizona State	3

Semifinal round May 31
1	Vanderbilt	1.5
4	Texas	3.5
6	Pepperdine	1
7	Arizona State	4

Final round June 1
4	Texas	3
7	Arizona State	2

== Individual competition ==
- Par, single-round: 70
- Par, total: 280
- The field was cut after 54 holes to the top 15 teams and the top nine individuals not on a top 15 team. These 84 players competed for the individual championship

Place	Player	University	Score	To par
1	Gordon Sargent†	Vanderbilt	70-68-68-74=280	E
T2	Parker Coody	Texas	72-70-68-70=280	E
T2	Ryan Burnett	North Carolina	71-69-70-70=280	E
T2	Eugenio Lopez-Chacarra	Oklahoma State	73-70-65-72=280	E
T5	Cameron Sisk	Arizona State	70-73-68-70=281	+1
T5	William Mouw	Pepperdine	71-70-70-70=281	+1
T5	David Ford	North Carolina	71-70-69-71=281	+1
T5	Chris Gotterup	Oklahoma	73-66-68-74=281	+1
9	Mateo Fernandez De Oliveira	Arkansas	71-71-68-72=282	+2
10	Sam Bennett	Texas A&M	77-70-72-64=283	+3

- † Gordon Sargent won on the first hole of a sudden-death playoff
