= 1973 NCAA University Division golf championship =

1973 NCAA University Division Golf Championship
Tournament information
- Location: Stillwater, Oklahoma, U.S. 36.10709°N 97.12686°W
- Course: Stillwater Country Club

Statistics
- Field: 16 teams

Champion
- Team: Florida (2nd title); Individual: Ben Crenshaw, Texas (3rd title)

Location map
- Location in the United States Location in Oklahoma

The 1973 NCAA University Division Golf Championship was the 35th annual NCAA-sanctioned golf tournament to determine the individual and team national champions of men's collegiate golf at the University Division level in the United States.

The tournament was held at the Stillwater Country Club in Stillwater, Oklahoma.

Florida won the team championship, the Gators' second NCAA title.

Future Masters champion Ben Crenshaw, from Texas, won his third consecutive individual title. Crenshaw is one of only two players, alongside Phil Mickelson (1989, 1990, and 1992), to win three NCAA individual championships.

== Individual results ==
=== Individual champion ===
- Ben Crenshaw, Texas

== Team results ==
Rank	Team	Score
1	Florida	1,149
2	Oklahoma State	1,159
3	Texas (DC)	1,166
T4	New Mexico	1,170
T4	San Jose State	1,170
6	Houston	1,172
7	USC	1,175
8	Georgia	1,177
9	BYU	1,180
10	SMU	1,188

- Note: Top 10 only
- DC = Defending champions
