= 1949 NCAA golf championship =

1949 NCAA Golf Championship
Tournament information
- Location: Ames, Iowa, U.S. 42.039722°N 93.6525°W
- Course: Veenker Memorial Golf Course

Statistics
- Field: 31 teams

Champion
- Team: North Texas State (1st title); Individual: Harvie Ward (North Carolina)

Location map
- Location in the United States Location in Iowa

The 1949 NCAA Golf Championship was the 11th annual NCAA-sanctioned golf tournament. It was conducted to determine the individual and team national champions of men's collegiate golf in the United States.

The tournament was held at the Veenker Memorial Golf Course at the Iowa State College in Ames, Iowa.

North Texas State won the team title by ten strokes, the Eagles' first NCAA team national title.

== Individual results ==
=== Individual champion ===
- Harvie Ward, North Carolina

=== Tournament medalist ===
- Arnold Palmer, Wake Forest (141)

== Team results ==
Rank	Team	Score
1	North Texas State	590
T2	Purdue	600
T2	Texas	600
4	Michigan	602
5	San Jose State (DC)	603
6	Oklahoma A&M	606
7	Wake Forest	608
T8	North Carolina	610
T8	Ohio State	610
10	Miami (FL)	613

- Note: Top 10 only
- DC = Defending champions
