= 2015 NCAA Division I men's golf championship =

2015 NCAA Division I Men's Golf Championship
Tournament information
- Dates: May 29 – June 3, 2015
- Location: Bradenton, Florida, U.S.
- Course(s): The Concession Golf Club (University of South Florida)

Statistics
- Field: 156 players, 30 teams

Champion
- Team: LSU; Individual: Bryson DeChambeau, SMU
- Team: 4–1 (def. Southern California); Individual: 280 (−8)

The 2015 NCAA Division I Men's Golf Championship was the 77th annual tournament to determine the national champions of NCAA Division I collegiate golf. It was contested from May 29 – June 3, 2015 at the Concession Golf Club in Bradenton, Florida. The tournament was hosted by the University of South Florida. Two championships were awarded: team and individual. The LSU Tigers won their fifth national title and first since 1955.

This was also the first time that the men's and women's Division I golf tournaments were played at the same location and time.

== Regional qualifying tournaments ==
- The five teams with the lowest team scores qualified from each of the six regional tournaments for both the team and individual national championships.
- The lowest scoring individual not affiliated with one of the qualified teams in their regional also qualified for the individual national championship.

Regional name	Golf course	Location	Qualified teams^
Ball State Regional	The Sagamore Club	Noblesville, Indiana	Illinois, SMU, UNLV, UCLA, Oregon
North Carolina Regional	University of North Carolina Finley Golf Course	Chapel Hill, North Carolina	Charlotte, Stanford, Florida State, Florida, Clemson
San Diego Regional	The Farms Golf Club	Rancho Santa Fe, California	Oklahoma, Arizona State, Georgia Tech, Georgia, Virginia
Texas Tech Regional	The Rawls Course	Lubbock, Texas	Texas, Texas Tech, Duke, Auburn, Houston
Washington Regional	Gold Mountain Golf Club	Bremerton, Washington	UAB, South Carolina, Southern California, TCU, Washington
Yale Regional	The Course at Yale	New Haven, Connecticut	South Florida, San Diego State, Oklahoma State, Vanderbilt, LSU

^ – Teams listed in qualifying order.

== Venue ==
This was the first NCAA Division I Men's Golf Championship held at The Concession Golf Club in Bradenton, Florida, and the first time the tournament was hosted by the University of South Florida.

== Team competition ==
=== Leaderboard ===
Place	Team	Round 1	Round 2	Round 3	Round 4	Total	To par
1	Illinois	286	291	296	282	1155	+3
2	Vanderbilt	301	284	287	285	1157	+5
T3	Georgia	288	293	286	291	1158	+6
T3	Texas	294	300	280	284	1158	+6
5	Southern California	289	285	296	291	1161	+9
6	South Florida	294	291	292	291	1168	+16
7	LSU	292	289	290	298	1169	+17
8	UCLA	294	304	280	294	1172	+20
9	Georgia Tech	293	295	290	297	1175	+23
10	TCU	296	293	291	299	1179	+27
11	Florida State	298	292	293	298	1181	+29
12	Auburn	301	290	296	296	1183	+31
13	South Carolina	301	298	288	300	1187	+35
14	SMU	296	303	291	302	1192	+40
15	San Diego State	290	299	298	306	1193	+41

Remaining teams: Washington (890), Texas Tech (891), Virginia (893), Oklahoma State (896), UAB (896), Stanford (899), Charlotte (901), Oregon (902), Arizona State (903), Duke (903), Houston (906), UNLV (906), Florida (910), Oklahoma (910), Clemson (915).

After 54 holes, the field of 30 teams was cut to the top 15. SMU beat Washington on the first hole of a sudden-death playoff for the 15th spot.

=== Match play bracket ===
- The eight teams with the lowest total scores advanced to the match play bracket.

Quarterfinals; June 2, morning
1	Illinois	3
8	UCLA	2
4	Texas	1
5	Southern California	4
3	Georgia	4
6	South Florida	1
2	Vanderbilt	1.5
7	LSU	3.5

Semifinals; June 2, afternoon
1	Illinois	1.5
5	Southern California	3.5
3	Georgia	1.5
7	LSU	3.5

Final; June 3
5	Southern California	1
7	LSU	4

== Individual competition ==
Place	Player	University	Score	To par
1	Bryson DeChambeau	SMU	70-67-72-71=280	−8
2	Pan Cheng-tsung	Washington	72-70-72-67=281	−7
T3	Hunter Stewart	Vanderbilt	74-69-71-68=282	−6
T3	Thomas Detry	Illinois	68-71-73-70=282	−6
5	Paul Dunne	UAB	72-69-69-73=283	−5
6	Claudio Correa	South Florida	68-75-69-72=284	−4
7	Andrew Presley	TCU	73-70-72-70=285	−3
T8	Doug Ghim	Texas	72-73-70-71=286	−2
T8	Riley Davenport	Charlotte	70-74-72-70=286	−2
10	Beau Hossler	Texas	72-75-69-71=287	−1

The field was cut after 54 holes to the top 15 teams and the top nine individuals not on a top 15 team. These 84 players competed for the individual championship.

== See also ==
- 2015 NCAA Division I Women's Golf Championship
