= 1969 NCAA University Division golf championship =

1969 NCAA University Division Golf Championship
Tournament information
- Location: Colorado Springs, Colorado, U.S. 38.7911°N 104.8502°W
- Course: Broadmoor Golf Club

Statistics
- Field: 16 teams

Champion
- Team: Houston (11th title); Individual: Bob Clark, Cal State Los Angeles

Location map
- Location in the United States Location in Colorado

The 1969 NCAA University Division Golf Championship was the 31st annual NCAA-sanctioned golf tournament to determine the individual and team national champions of men's collegiate golf in the United States.

The tournament was held at the Broadmoor Golf Club at The Broadmoor resort in Colorado Springs, Colorado.

Houston won the team title, the Cougars' eleventh NCAA team national title.

== Individual results ==
=== Individual champion ===
- Bob Clark, Cal State Los Angeles

== Team results ==
Rank	Team	Score
1	Houston	1,223
2	Wake Forest	1,232
T3	Arizona State	1,240
T3	BYU	1,240
T5	Florida (DC)	1,241
T5	Georgia	1,241
7	North Texas State	1,245
8	Texas	1,250
9	Stanford	1,253
10	Oklahoma State	1,255

- Note: Top 10 only
- DC = Defending champions
