= 1940 NCAA golf championship =

1940 NCAA Golf Championship
Tournament information
- Location: Manchester, Vermont, U.S.
- Course: Ekwanok Country Club

Statistics
- Length: 6,082 yards
- Field: 20 teams

Champion
- Team: LSU and Princeton; Individual: Dixon Brooke (Virginia)
- Team: 601

The 1940 NCAA Golf Championship was the second annual NCAA-sanctioned golf tournament to determine the individual and team national champions of men's collegiate golf in the United States. The tournament was held at the Ekwanok Country Club in Manchester, Vermont.

LSU and Princeton shared the team championship, the first for both programs. Dixon Brooke from Virginia captured the individual title. The Tigers from LSU were coached by Mike Donahue and the Tigers from Princeton by Walter Bourne.

John P. Burke (Georgetown), with a score of 143, was the tournament's medalist.

== Team results ==
Rank	Team	Score
T1	LSU	601
T1	Princeton	601
3	Georgetown	606
4	Duke	612
5	Illinois	616
T6	USC	617
T6	Stanford	617
8	Iowa State A&M	618
9	Michigan State College	620
T10	Northwestern	621
T10	Yale	621

- Note: Top 10 only
