= 1939 NCAA golf championship =

1939 NCAA Golf Championship
Tournament information
- Dates: June 24–29, 1939
- Location: Des Moines, Iowa, U.S.
- Course: Wakonda Country Club

Statistics
- Field: 23 teams

Champion
- Team: Stanford; Individual: Vincent D'Antoni (Tulane)
- Team: 612

The 1939 NCAA Golf Championship was the first annual NCAA-sanctioned golf tournament to determine the individual and team national champions of men's collegiate golf in the United States. The tournament was held at the Wakonda Country Club in Des Moines, Iowa.

Stanford captured in the inaugural team championship and Vincent D'Antoni, from Tulane, won the individual title. The Indians were coached by Eddie Twiggs. The Indians had also won the last collegiate golf championship, held at Oakmont Country Club in 1938, before the beginning of NCAA sponsorship.

Sid Richardson of Northwestern, with a score of 144, was the tournament's medalist.

== Team results ==
Rank	Team	Score
1	Stanford	612
T2	Northwestern	614
T2	Princeton	614
4	Iowa Agricultural	615
T5	Duke	617
T5	LSU	617
7	Iowa	623
8	Michigan	624
9	Oklahoma	627
10	Georgetown	630
T11	Minnesota	633
T11	Notre Dame	633
13	Yale	635
14	Texas	640
15	USC	641
16	California	643
17	Amherst	644
T18	Harvard	645
T18	Ohio State	645
20	Missouri	653
21	Michigan State	657
22	Kansas	660
23	Chicago	687
