= 1968 NCAA University Division golf championship =

1968 NCAA University Division Golf Championship
Tournament information
- Location: Las Cruces, New Mexico, U.S. 32.286°N 106.731°W
- Course: NMSU Golf Course

Statistics
- Field: 15 teams

Champion
- Team: Florida (1st title); Individual: Grier Jones, Oklahoma State

Location map
- Location in the United States Location in New Mexico

The 1968 NCAA University Division Golf Championship was the 30th annual NCAA-sanctioned golf tournament to determine the individual and team national champions of men's collegiate golf in the United States.

The tournament was held at the New Mexico State University Golf Course in Las Cruces, New Mexico.

Florida won the team title, the Gators' first NCAA team national title.

== Individual results ==
=== Individual champion ===
- Grier Jones, Oklahoma State

== Team results ==
Rank	Team	Score
1	Florida	1,154
2	Houston (DC)	1,156
3	Wake Forest	1,160
T4	Oklahoma State	1,162
T4	Texas	1,162
6	Arizona State	1,166
7	New Mexico	1,171
8	Colorado	1,172
9	Michigan State	1,175
10	Florida State	1,180

- Note: Top 10 only
- DC = Defending champions
