= 1975 NCAA Division I golf championship =

1975 NCAA Division I Golf Championship
Tournament information
- Location: Columbus, Ohio, U.S. 40.031886°N 83.0523498°W
- Course: Ohio State University Golf Club

Statistics
- Field: 17 teams

Champion
- Team: Wake Forest (2nd title); Individual: Jay Haas, Wake Forest

Location map
- Location in the United States Location in Ohio

The 1975 NCAA Division I Golf Championship was the 37th annual NCAA-sanctioned golf tournament to determine the individual and team national champions of men's collegiate golf at the University Division level in the United States.

The tournament was held at the Ohio State University Golf Club in Columbus, Ohio.

Defending champions Wake Forest won the team championship, the Demon Deacons' second NCAA title.

Wake Forest's thirty-three stroke advantage over second-placed Oklahoma State would remain the largest team margin of victory until the switch to championship match play in 2009.

Jay Haas, also from Wake Forest, won the individual title.

== Individual results ==
=== Individual champion ===
- Jay Haas, Wake Forest

== Team results ==
Rank	Team	Score
1	Wake Forest (DC)	1,156
2	Oklahoma State	1,189
T3	Alabama	1,190
T3	USC	1,190
5	BYU	1,194
6	East Tennessee State	1,202
T7	Indiana	1,204
T7	Texas	1,204
9	Arizona State	1,205
10	Florida	1,206
11	Ohio State	1,207
12	Houston	1,208
13	LSU	1,212
14	NC State	1,213
15	Georgia Southern	1,214
16	Oregon	1,208
17	SMU	1,225

- DC = Defending champions
- Debut appearance
