= 1974 NCAA Division I golf championship =

1974 NCAA Division I Golf Championship
Tournament information
- Location: Santee, California, U.S. 32.842824°N 117.009842°W
- Course: Carlton Oaks Country Club

Statistics
- Field: 15 teams

Champion
- Team: Wake Forest (1st title); Individual: Curtis Strange, Wake Forest

Location map
- Location in the United States Location in California

The 1974 NCAA Division I Golf Championship was the 36th annual NCAA-sanctioned golf tournament to determine the individual and team national champions of men's collegiate golf at the University Division level in the United States.

The tournament was held at the Carlton Oaks Country Club in Santee, California, a suburb of San Diego.

Wake Forest won the team championship, the Demon Deacons' first NCAA title.

Curtis Strange, also from Wake Forest, won the individual title.

Wake Forest staged the largest comeback in NCAA Championship history and Curtis Strange won the title with one of the greatest shots in championship golf history. The Demon Deacons erased a 33-shot deficit after the second round to go into the final round only three shots out of the lead. On the 72nd and final hole, Strange teed off on a par-5 with Wake Forest tied for the team lead. On his second shot, he hit a one-iron to within three feet and rolled in the putt for a championship-clinching eagle.

== Individual results ==
=== Individual champion ===
- Curtis Strange, Wake Forest

== Team results ==
Rank	Team	Score
1	Wake Forest	1,158
2	Florida (DC)	1,160
3	Houston	1,176
4	USC	1,177
5	Oklahoma State	1,178
T6	Indiana	1,186
T6	New Mexico	1,186
8	Long Beach State	1,193
T9	BYU	1,194
T9	San Jose State	1,194
T11	Arizona State	1,196
T11	Oklahoma	1,196
13	North Texas State	1,200
14	Alabama	1,205
15	Texas	1,208

- DC = Defending champions
- Debut appearance
