= 1963 NCAA University Division golf championship =

1963 NCAA University Division Golf Championship
Tournament information
- Location: Wichita, Kansas, U.S. 37.7056°N 97.2365°W
- Course: Wichita Country Club

Statistics
- Field: 30 teams

Champion
- Team: Oklahoma State (1st title); Individual: R. H. Sikes, Arkansas

Location map
- Location in the United States Location in Kansas

The 1963 NCAA University Division Golf Championship was the 25th annual NCAA-sanctioned golf tournament to determine the individual and team national champions of men's collegiate golf in the United States.

This was the first tournament held exclusively for University Division, now Division I, programs. College Division programs, which now comprise Division II and Division III took part in their own championship, held in Springfield, Missouri and won by Southwest Missouri State. The tournament was held at the Wichita Country Club at the then-Municipal University of Wichita in Wichita, Kansas. Oklahoma State won the team title, the Cowboys' first NCAA team national title.

== Individual results ==
=== Individual champion ===
- R. H. Sikes, Arkansas

=== Tournament medalist ===
- R. H. Sikes, Arkansas (139)

== Team results ==
| Rank | Team | Score |
|---|---|---|
| 1 | Oklahoma State | 581 |
| 2 | Houston (DC) | 582 |
| 3 | North Texas State | 585 |
| 4 | USC | 587 |
| 5 | Georgia | 590 |
| T6 | Texas | 591 |
| T6 | Wake Forest | 591 |
| 8 | Navy | 595 |
| 9 | Stanford | 596 |
| 10 | Washington | 597 |

- Note: Top 10 only
- DC = Defending champions
