= 2014 NCAA Division I men's golf championship =

Coordinates: 38.091°N 97.848°W

2014 NCAA Division I Men's Golf Championship
Tournament information
- Dates: May 23–28, 2014
- Location: Hutchinson, Kansas, U.S.
- Course: Prairie Dunes Country Club

Statistics
- Par: 70
- Length: 6,598 yards (6,033 m)
- Field: 156 players, 30 teams

Champion
- Team: Alabama; Individual: Cameron Wilson, Stanford
- Team: 4–1 (def. Oklahoma State); Individual: 204 (−6)

The 2014 NCAA Division I Men's Golf Championship was a golf tournament contested from May 23–28, 2014 at the Prairie Dunes Country Club in Hutchinson, Kansas. It was the 76th NCAA Division I Men's Golf Championship. The tournament was hosted by Wichita State University. The Alabama Crimson Tide won their second consecutive championship.

== Regional qualifying tournaments ==
- The five teams with the lowest team scores qualified from each of the six regional tournaments for both the team and individual national championships.
- The lowest scoring individual not affiliated with one of the qualified teams in their regional also qualified for the individual national championship.

Regional name	Golf course	Location	Qualified teams
Auburn Regional	Auburn University Club	Auburn, Alabama	Alabama, Auburn, Kennesaw State, Texas, Virginia Tech
Columbia Regional	The Club at Old Hawthorne	Columbia, Missouri	Arkansas, Iowa State, LSU, Missouri, Oklahoma State
Raleigh Regional	Lonnie Poole Golf Course	Raleigh, North Carolina	Florida State, Georgia Tech, Kentucky, Texas A&M, Washington
Sugar Grove Regional	Rich Harvest Farms	Sugar Grove, Illinois	California, Illinois, Purdue, Southern California, UAB
Eugene Regional	Eugene Country Club	Eugene, Oregon	Houston, Oklahoma, Oregon, South Carolina, Stanford
San Antonio Regional	Briggs Ranch Golf Course	San Antonio, Texas	Georgia, Georgia State, SMU, UCLA, Vanderbilt

== Venue ==
This is the first NCAA Division I Men's Golf Championship held at the Prairie Dunes Country Club in Hutchinson, Kansas, located about an hour north of Wichita. This is the second time the tournament has been hosted by Wichita State University; the last time the Shockers hosted was in 1963.

== Team competition ==
=== Leaderboard ===
- Par, single-round: 280
- Par, total: 840

Place	Team	Round 1	Round 2	Round 3	Total	To par
1	Stanford	281	267	279	827	−13
T2	Alabama	274	278	284	836	−4
T2	LSU	279	278	279	836	−4
4	Oklahoma State	277	279	284	840	E
5	Georgia Tech	277	282	282	841	+1
6	UCLA	279	284	281	844	+4
T7	SMU	275	285	285	845	+5
T7	Illinois	285	280	280	845	+5
9	South Carolina	272	292	282	846	+6
10	Houston	284	285	279	848	+8

- Remaining teams: California (850), Georgia (850), Texas (851), Oregon (852), Washington (853), Oklahoma (854), Vanderbilt (854), Arkansas (857), Kentucky (857), Missouri (859), UAB (862), Georgia State (863), Auburn (866), Florida State (870), Iowa State (871), Kennesaw State (872), Purdue (873), Virginia Tech (876), Texas A&M (881), Southern California (889)

=== Match play bracket ===
- The eight teams with the lowest total scores after the first three rounds of play advanced to the match play bracket.

Quarterfinals; May 27, morning
1	Stanford	3
8	Illinois	2
4	Oklahoma State	4
5	Georgia Tech	0
3	LSU	4
6	UCLA	1
2	Alabama	3
7	SMU	2

Semifinals; May 27, afternoon
1	Stanford	2
4	Oklahoma State	3
3	LSU	1
2	Alabama	4

Final; May 28
4	Oklahoma State	1
2	Alabama	4

== Individual competition ==
- Par, single-round: 70
- Par, total: 210*

Place	Player	University	Score	To par
1	Cameron Wilson^	Stanford	71-63-70=204	−6
2	Ollie Schniederjans	Georgia Tech	71-65-68=204	−6
T3	David Boote	Stanford	73-67-65=205	−5
T3	James Ross	Houston	70-69-66=205	−5
T3	Robby Shelton	Alabama	72-65-68=205	−5
T6	Denny McCarthy	Virginia	65-71-70=206	−4
T6	Seth Reeves	Georgia Tech	66-72-68=206	−4
T6	Benjamin Taylor	LSU	71-67-68=206	−4
T9	Brian Campbell	Illinois	70-74-63=207	−3
T9	Sebastian Cappelen	Arkansas	68-71-68=207	−3
T9	Lorens Chan	UCLA	70-70-67=207	−3
T9	Bryson DeChambeau	SMU	69-69-69=207	−3
T9	Toni Hakula	Texas	72-68-67=207	−3
T9	Ryan Zech	Missouri	70-69-68=207	−3

* Originally scheduled for four rounds (72 holes), shortened to 54 holes due to weather delays.
^ Wilson won on third hole of sudden-death playoff.
