= 1950 NCAA golf championship =

1950 NCAA Golf Championship
Tournament information
- Location: Albuquerque, New Mexico, U.S. 35.039333°N 106.610778°W
- Courses: University of New Mexico Golf Course, Championship Course

Statistics
- Field: 23 teams

Champion
- Team: North Texas State (2nd title); Individual: Fred Wampler (Purdue)

Location map
- Location in the United States Location in New Mexico

The 1950 NCAA Golf Championship was the 12th annual NCAA-sanctioned golf tournament to determine the individual and team national champions of men's collegiate golf in the United States.

The tournament was held at the University of New Mexico Golf Course in Albuquerque, New Mexico.

Defending champions North Texas State again won the team title, the Eagles' second NCAA team national title.

== Individual results ==
=== Individual champion ===
- Fred Wampler, Purdue

=== Tournament medalist ===
- Arnold Palmer, Wake Forest (138)

== Team results ==
Rank	Team	Score
1	North Texas State (DC)	573
2	Purdue	577
3	Stanford	587
4	Oklahoma	590
5	Wake Forest	591
T6	North Carolina	592
T6	Ohio State	592
8	Illinois	596
9	Utah	597
10	San Diego State	599

- Note: Top 10 only
- DC = Defending champions
