= 1951 NCAA golf championship =

1951 NCAA Golf Championship
Tournament information
- Location: Columbus, Ohio, U.S. 40.031886°N 83.0523498°W
- Course: Ohio State University Golf Club

Statistics
- Field: 23 teams

Champion
- Team: North Texas State (3rd title); Individual: Tom Nieporte (Ohio State)

Location map
- Location in the United States Location in Ohio

The 1951 NCAA Golf Championship was the 13th annual NCAA-sanctioned golf tournament to determine the individual and team national champions of men's collegiate golf in the United States.

The tournament was held at the Ohio State University Golf Club in Columbus, Ohio.

Two-time defending champions North Texas State again won the team title, the Eagles' third NCAA team national title.

== Individual results ==
=== Individual champion ===
- Tom Nieporte, Ohio State

=== Tournament medalist ===
- Sam Kocsis, Detroit (141)

== Team results ==
Rank	Team	Score
1	North Texas State (DC)	588
2	Ohio State	589
3	Notre Dame	604
4	Detroit	605
5	Purdue	611
6	Wisconsin	612
T7	North Carolina	613
T7	Northwestern	613
9	Stanford	614
10	USC	616

- Note: Top 10 only
- DC = Defending champions
