= Aaron Wise (golfer) =

American professional golfer (born 1996)

Personal information
- Full name: Aaron Kyle Wise
- Nationality: United States
- Born: June 21, 1996 (age 30) Cape Town, South Africa
- Height: 6 ft 1 in (1.85 m)
- Weight: 175 lb (79 kg; 12.5 st)

Career
- Sport: Golf
- College: University of Oregon
- Turned professional: 2016
- Current tour: PGA Tour
- Former tours: PGA Tour Canada; Web.com Tour
- Professional wins: 3
- Highest ranking: 33 (December 11, 2022) (as of October 25, 2026)

Number of wins by tour
- PGA Tour: 1
- Korn Ferry Tour: 1
- Other: 1

Best results in major championships
- Masters Tournament: 17th: 2019
- PGA Championship: T17: 2021
- U.S. Open: T27: 2022
- The Open Championship: T34: 2022

Achievements and awards
- PGA Tour Rookie of the Year: 2017–18

Aaron Kyle Wise (born June 21, 1996) is an American professional golfer who plays on the PGA Tour. In 2018 he earned his inaugural win on the PGA Tour at the AT&T Byron Nelson and was named the 2018 Rookie of the Year.

== Amateur career ==
Born in Cape Town, South Africa, Wise moved to the U.S. with his family when he was three. Raised in Lake Elsinore, California, he attended Santiago High School in Corona and graduated in 2014. Highly recruited, he chose to play college golf at the University of Oregon in Eugene, where he helped the host Ducks win the NCAA title in 2016, and also won the NCAA individual title.

== Professional career ==
After two years at Oregon, Wise turned professional after the NCAA championship. He made his professional debut after qualifying for the U.S. Open, also his first major championship appearance. He missed the cut after shooting rounds of 74-76. In his third start as a professional, he won the Syncrude Oil Country Championship on the PGA Tour Canada. He finished fourth on the Order of Merit and earned a Web.com Tour card for the 2017 season.

On June 18, 2017, Wise won the Air Capital Classic in Wichita, Kansas, five strokes ahead of runner-up Beau Hossler. This win allowed him to earn a PGA Tour card for the 2018 season; he finished 18th on the Web.com regular season money list and was promoted.

At age 21 in May 2018, Wise gained his first PGA Tour win at the AT&T Byron Nelson in Texas; it was his 18th start as a member of the tour. He shot a final round 65 for 261 (−23) at the new Trinity Forest Golf Club in Dallas, three strokes ahead of runner-up Marc Leishman, a co-leader after 54 holes. The win moved Wise from 99th to a career-best 66th in the world rankings. Wise won the 2018 PGA Tour Rookie of the Year award.

== Amateur wins ==
- 2014 San Diego Junior Amateur, Inland Empire Amateur, Ka'anapali Collegiate Classic
- 2015 Desert Mountain Intercollegiate, Pacific Coast Amateur
- 2016 Amer Ari Invitational, Australian Master of the Amateurs, NCAA Division I Men's Golf Championship

== Professional wins (3) ==
=== PGA Tour wins (1) ===
No.	Date	Tournament	Winning score	To par	Margin of victory	Runner-up
1	May 20, 2018	AT&T Byron Nelson	65-63-68-65=261	−23	3 strokes	(Australia) Marc Leishman

=== Web.com Tour wins (1) ===
No.	Date	Tournament	Winning score	To par	Margin of victory	Runner-up
1	Jun 18, 2017	Air Capital Classic	62-62-67-68=259	−21	5 strokes	(United States) Beau Hossler

=== PGA Tour Canada wins (1) ===
No.	Date	Tournament	Winning score	To par	Margin of victory	Runners-up
1	Jul 31, 2016	Syncrude Oil Country Championship	67-66-66-70=269	−19	5 strokes	(Argentina) Emilio Domínguez, (United States) Brock Mackenzie

== Results in major championships ==
Results not in chronological order in 2020.

Tournament	2016	2017	2018
Masters Tournament			
U.S. Open	CUT		CUT
The Open Championship			
PGA Championship			CUT

Tournament	2019	2020	2021	2022	2023
Masters Tournament	17				
PGA Championship	T41		T17	T23	CUT
U.S. Open	T35			T27	CUT
The Open Championship	T41	NT		T34	

Did not play

CUT = missed the half-way cut
"T" = tied
NT = No tournament due to COVID-19 pandemic

=== Summary ===
Tournament	Wins	2nd	3rd	Top-5	Top-10	Top-25	Events	Cuts made
Masters Tournament	0	0	0	0	0	1	1	1
PGA Championship	0	0	0	0	0	2	5	3
U.S. Open	0	0	0	0	0	0	5	2
The Open Championship	0	0	0	0	0	0	2	2
Totals	0	0	0	0	0	3	13	8

- Most consecutive cuts made – 8 (2019 Masters – 2022 Open Championship)
- Longest streak of top-10s – n/a

== Results in The Players Championship ==
Tournament	2019	2020	2021	2022	2023
The Players Championship	CUT	C	T65	T50	CUT

CUT = missed the halfway cut
"T" indicates a tie for a place
C = Canceled after the first round due to the COVID-19 pandemic

== Results in World Golf Championships ==
Tournament	2018	2019	2020	2021	2022	2023
Championship		T19				
Match Play		T40	NT^{1}			T31
Invitational	T6					
Champions			NT^{1}	NT^{1}	NT^{1}	

^{1}Cancelled due to COVID-19 pandemic

Top 10
Did not play

"T" = Tied
NT = No tournament
Note that the Championship and Invitational were discontinued from 2022. The Champions was discontinued from 2023.

== See also ==
- 2017 Web.com Tour Finals graduates
