= 2016 NCAA Division I men's golf championship =

2016 NCAA Division I Men's Golf Championship
Tournament information
- Dates: May 27 – June 1, 2016
- Location: Eugene, Oregon, U.S.
- Course(s): Eugene Country Club (University of Oregon)

Statistics
- Field: 156 players, 30 teams

Champion
- Team: Oregon; Individual: Aaron Wise, Oregon
- Team: 3–2 (def. Texas); Individual: 275 (−5)

The 2016 NCAA Division I Men's Golf Championship was the 78th annual tournament to determine the national champions of NCAA Division I men's collegiate golf. It was contested from May 27 to June 1 at the Eugene Country Club in Eugene, Oregon. Host team Oregon won 3–2 over Texas and Aaron Wise of Oregon won the individual competition.

== Qualifying ==
- The five teams with the lowest team scores qualified from each of the six regional tournaments for both the team and individual national championships.
- The lowest scoring individual not affiliated with one of the qualified teams in their regional also qualified for the individual national championship.

=== Regional tournaments ===
Regional name	Golf course	Location	Qualified teams
Alabama Regional	Ol' Colony Golf Complex	Tuscaloosa, Alabama	Alabama, Auburn, Georgia, Kentucky, South Carolina
Arizona Regional	Gallery Golf Club	Marana, Arizona	UAB, California, Oregon, Stanford, Wake Forest
Marquette Regional	Blackwolf Run, Meadow Valleys Course	Kohler, Wisconsin	Arkansas, Baylor, Florida, Florida State, Illinois
New Mexico Regional	Championship Course at University of New Mexico	Albuquerque, New Mexico	Arizona State, South Florida, Southern California, TCU, San Diego State
Oklahoma State Regional	Karsten Creek Golf Club	Stillwater, Oklahoma	Clemson, Louisville, Oklahoma, Oklahoma State, Purdue
Vanderbilt Regional	Vanderbilt Legends Club	Franklin, Tennessee	Houston, LSU, Texas, Vanderbilt, Virginia

== Team competition ==
=== Leaderboard ===
Place	Team	Round 1	Round 2	Round 3	Round 4	Total	To par
1	Texas	289	281	277	287	1134	+14
2	Illinois	290	280	289	276	1135	+15
3	LSU	286	282	283	285	1136	+16
T4	Southern California	283	282	285	287	1137	+17
T4	Vanderbilt	283	280	282	292	1137	+17
6	Oregon	291	277	284	287	1139	+19
7	South Carolina	287	285	293	277	1142	+22
8	Oklahoma	290	288	289	277	1144	+24
9	Arizona State	290	281	286	291	1148	+28
T10	California	287	284	287	292	1150	+30
T10	Oklahoma State	285	289	285	291	1150	+30
12	Arkansas	282	284	289	298	1153	+33
13	Kentucky	289	286	288	294	1157	+37
14	Louisville	291	282	294	291	1158	+38
15	Florida	286	287	293	297	1163	+43

Remaining teams: Clemson (867), Georgia (867), TCU (867), Auburn (868), Florida State (868), Houston (868), Virginia (869), Alabama (871), Wake Forest (871), San Diego State (872), South Florida (876), Baylor (880), Stanford (884), Purdue (898), UAB (902).

After 54 holes, the field of 30 teams was cut to the top 15. Five teams were tied for 14th place and Louisville and Oklahoma advanced over Clemson, Georgia, and TCU based on fifth player scorecards, a new tie-break system.

=== Match play bracket ===
- The eight teams with the lowest total scores advanced to the match play bracket.

Quarterfinals; May 31, morning
1	Texas	4
8	Oklahoma	1
4	Southern California	4
5	Vanderbilt	1
3	LSU	1.5
6	Oregon	3.5
2	Illinois	4
7	South Carolina	1

Semifinals; May 31, afternoon
1	Texas	4
4	Southern California	1
6	Oregon	3
2	Illinois	2

Final; June 1
1	Texas	2
6	Oregon	3

== Individual competition ==
Place	Player	University	Score	To par
1	Aaron Wise	Oregon	70-70-64-71=275	−5
2	Rico Hoey	Southern California	70-69-69-69=277	−3
T3	Jon Rahm	Arizona State	71-68-69-71=279	−1
T3	Matthias Schwab	Vanderbilt	71-68-67-73=279	−1
5	Beau Hossler	Texas	70-70-67-73=280	E
T6	Lee McCoy	Georgia	69-70-70-72=281	+1
T6	Robby Shelton	Alabama	70-66-72-73=281	+1
T8	Charlie Danielson	Illinois	72-69-70-71=282	+2
T8	Antoine Rozner	Missouri - Kansas City	70-72-70-70=282	+2
T10	Thomas Detry	Illinois	73-70-73-67=283	+3
T10	Collin Morikawa	California	73-69-70-71=283	+3
T10	Justin Suh	Southern California	68-67-75-73=283	+3

The field was cut after 54 holes to the top 15 teams and the top nine individuals not on a top 15 team. These 84 players competed for the individual championship.
