= 1982 NCAA Division I men's golf championship =

1982 NCAA Division I Men's Golf Championship
Tournament information
- Location: Pinehurst, North Carolina, U.S. 35.1895°N 79.4678°W
- Course: Pinehurst Resort

Statistics
- Field: 31 teams

Champion
- Team: Houston (14th title); Individual: Billy Ray Brown, Houston

Location map
- Location in the United States Location in North Carolina

The 1982 NCAA Division I Men's Golf Championships was the 44th annual NCAA-sanctioned golf tournament to determine the individual and team national champions of men's collegiate golf at the University Division level in the United States.

The tournament was held at the Pinehurst Resort in Pinehurst, North Carolina.

Houston won the team championship, the Cougars' fourteenth NCAA title.

Billy Ray Brown, also from Houston, won the individual title.

== Individual results ==
=== Individual champion ===
- Billy Ray Brown, Houston

== Team results ==
Rank	Team	Score
1	Houston	1,141
2	Oklahoma State	1,151
3	Arizona State	1,156
4	Texas A&M	1,161
5	BYU (DC)	1,162
6	UCLA	1,163
7	Texas	1,165
8	NC State	1,167
9	North Carolina	1,170
T10	Miami (FL)	1,173
T10	Wake Forest	1,173
12	Weber State	1,175
13	San José State	1,176
14	San Diego State	1,178
15	Ohio State	1,180

- Missed cut: Clemson, Oklahoma, Georgia, USC, Ball State, North Texas State, Tennessee, Oral Roberts, Long Beach State, New Mexico, Florida State, ETSU, American, Temple, Indiana, Holy Cross
- DC = Defending champions
- Debut appearance
