= 2013 NCAA Division I men's golf championship =

2013 NCAA Division I Men's Golf Championship
Tournament information
- Dates: May 28 – June 2, 2013
- Location: Atlanta, Georgia, U.S.
- Course(s): Capital City Club, Crabapple Course

Statistics
- Par: 70
- Length: 7,319 yards (6,692 m)
- Field: 156 players, 30 teams

Champion
- Team: Alabama; Individual: Max Homa, California
- Team: 4–1 (def. Illinois); Individual: 201 (−9)

The 2013 NCAA Division I Men's Golf Championship was a golf tournament contested from May 28 to June 2 at the Crabapple Course of the Capital City Club in Atlanta, Georgia. It was the 75th NCAA Division I Men's Golf Championship, and the tournament was hosted by the Georgia Institute of Technology. The tournament was won by the Alabama Crimson Tide who won their first championship by defeating the Illinois Fighting Illini in the match-play championship round. The individual national championship was won by Max Homa of the California Golden Bears who won by three strokes.

The seedings for the regional tournaments were released on May 6, 2013, and the regional rounds were held around the country from May 16 to May 18, 2013.

== Regional qualifying tournaments ==
- The five teams with the lowest team scores qualified from each of the six regional tournaments for both the team and individual national championships in Atlanta.
- The lowest scoring individual not affiliated with one of the qualified teams in their regional also qualified for the individual national championship in Atlanta.

Regional name	Golf course	Location	Qualified teams
Baton Rouge Regional	University Club of Baton Rouge	Baton Rouge, Louisiana	Alabama, Florida, LSU, Tennessee, Coastal Carolina
Columbus Regional	Ohio State University Golf Club	Columbus, Ohio	New Mexico, Auburn, South Carolina, UNLV, Texas Tech
Fayetteville Regional	Blessings Golf Club	Fayetteville, Arkansas	Illinois, Arkansas, Texas, Oklahoma State, Kent State
Pullman Regional	Palouse Ridge Golf Club	Pullman, Washington	California, TCU, Saint Mary's (CA), Southern California, Ball State
Tallahassee Regional	Golden Eagle Golf and Country Club	Tallahassee, Florida	North Florida, Washington, Florida State, Georgia Tech, Oklahoma
Tempe Regional	Arizona State University Karsten Golf Course	Tempe, Arizona	UCLA, Georgia, UCF, Texas A&M, Arizona State

== Venue ==
This will be the first NCAA Division I Men's Golf Championship held at the Capital City Club in Atlanta, Georgia.

== Team competition ==
=== Leaderboard ===
- Par, single-round: 280
- Par, total: 840

Place	Team	Round 1	Round 2	Round 3	Total	To par
1	California	277	272	275	824	−16
2	Georgia Tech	274	274	282	830	−10
T3	Alabama	275	276	282	833	−7
T3	Texas	279	271	283	833	−7
5	Illinois	276	281	278	835	−5
T6	New Mexico	292	274	276	842	+2
T6	UNLV	286	284	272	842	+2
T6	Arizona State	270	288	284	842	+2
9	Texas A&M	285	275	282	842	+2
10	Arkansas	286	271	286	843	+3

- Note: Texas A&M (+1) eliminated in playoff for last three spots in match play, Arizona State (E), New Mexico (E), and UNLV (E) advanced.
- Remaining teams: Florida State (845), Oklahoma (845), Auburn (846), Oklahoma State (847), Texas Tech (847), UCF (848), Washington (848), North Florida (849), Georgia (850), TCU (850), Tennessee (850), Coastal Carolina (851), LSU (854), Southern California (854), Florida (857), UCLA (858), Kent State (868), South Carolina (868), Saint Mary's (869), Ball State (872)

=== Match play bracket ===
- The eight teams with the lowest total scores after the first three rounds of play will advance to the match play bracket.

Quarterfinals; May 31
1	California	3
8	Arizona State	2
4	Texas	2
5	Illinois	3
3	Alabama	4
6	New Mexico	1
2	Georgia Tech	3
7	UNLV	2

Semifinals; June 1
1	California	2
5	Illinois	3
3	Alabama	4
2	Georgia Tech	1

Final; June 2
5	Illinois	1
3	Alabama	4

== Individual competition ==
- Par, single-round: 70
- Par, total: 210

Place	Player	University	Score	To par
1	Max Homa	California	70-65-66=201	−9
T2	Daniel Berger	Florida State	69-67-68=204	−6
T2	Dominic Bozzelli	Auburn	71-67-66=204	−6
T2	Rick Lamb	Tennessee	68-67-69=204	−6
T2	Kevin Penner	UNLV	69-67-68=204	−6
T2	Jon Rahm	Arizona State	61-72-71=204	−6
T2	Brandon Stone	Texas	68-68-68=204	−6
T8	Ian Davis	Oklahoma State	67-70-68=205	−5
T8	Tyler Dunlap	Texas A&M	69-68-68=205	−5
T8	Greg Eason	UCF	68-66-71=205	−5
T8	Brandon Hagy	California	66-69-70=205	−5
T8	Ollie Schniederjans	Georgia Tech	67-68-70=205	−5
