= 1954 NCAA golf championship =

1954 NCAA Golf Championship
Tournament information
- Location: Houston, Texas, U.S. 29.68°N 95.51°W
- Course: Braeburn Country Club

Statistics
- Field: 20 teams

Champion
- Team: SMU (1st title); Individual: Hillman Robbins, Memphis State

Location map
- Location in the United States Location in Texas

The 1954 NCAA Golf Championship was the 16th annual NCAA-sanctioned golf tournament to determine the individual and team national champions of men's collegiate golf in the United States.

The tournament was held at the Braeburn Country Club in Houston, Texas, co-hosted by the University of Houston and Rice University.

SMU won the team title, the Mustangs' NCAA team national title.

== Individual results ==
=== Individual champion ===
- Hillman Robbins, Memphis State

=== Tournament medalist ===
- Don Albert, Purdue (136)

== Team results ==
Rank	Team	Score
1	SMU	572
2	North Texas State	573
3	Oklahoma A&M	578
4	LSU	582
5	Houston	590
6	Stanford (DC)	595
7	Ohio State	596
T8	USC	597
T8	Texas	597
10	Purdue	599

- Note: Top 10 only
- DC = Defending champions
