= Texas Tech Red Raiders golf =

Texas Tech Red Raiders Golf
- University: Texas Tech University
- Conference: Big 12
- Athletic director: Kirby Hocutt
- Head coach: Men's: Greg Sands; Women's: JoJo Robertson
- Location: Lubbock, Texas
- Course: The Rawls Course; Par: 72; Yards: 7,207
- Nickname: Red Raiders
- Colors: Scarlet and black

NCAA match play
- Men: 2010, 2018, 2022; Women: 2015

NCAA Championship appearances
- Men: 1956, 1959, 1960, 1976, 2002, 2006, 2007, 2009, 2010, 2011, 2013, 2014, 2015, 2018, 2021, 2022, 2023, 2024, 2025 Women: 1993, 1994, 1996, 1997, 1999, 2000, 2001, 2004, 2005, 2008, 2010, 2011, 2012, 2013, 2023

Conference champions
- Men: 1936, 1937, 1939, 1955, 1959, 1971, 1996

The Texas Tech Red Raiders men's and women's golf teams represents Texas Tech University, often referred to as Texas Tech. The teams compete as members of the Big 12 Conference in the National Collegiate Athletic Association (NCAA).

== Head coaches ==
=== Men ===
- Jay McClure 1959- 1964
- Gene Mitchell (1967–70 and 1981–83)
- Danny Mason (1971–78)
- Richard Whittenburg (1979–80)
- Greg Reynolds (1984–85)
- Tommy Wilson (1986–98)
- Jeff Mitchell (1999–2000)
- Greg Sands (2001–present)

=== Women ===
- Jay McClure (1977–90)
- Jeff Mitchell (1990–2000)
- Stacy Totman (2000–09)
- JoJo Robertson (2010–present)

== Championships ==
=== Men ===
- Border Intercollegiate Athletic Association (Border Conference): 1936, 1937, 1939, 1955
- Southwest Conference (SWC): 1959, 1971, 1996

== Individual champions ==
=== Conference ===
Big 12 Conference
Year	Name
2022	Ludvig Åberg
2023	Ludvig Åberg

Åberg was also a two-time winner (2022, 2023) of the Ben Hogan Award, the award given to the best men's collegiate golfer. He is the school's only winner of that award.

== The Rawls Course ==
The Rawls Course, home of the Red Raiders golf teams, is located on the Texas Tech campus. Alumnus Jerry S. Rawls donated $8.6 million toward the total cost of approximately $15 million course. Completed in September 2003, the course features an 18-hole course, 60-acre (240,000 m^{2}) driving range, pitching and chipping areas and an indoor facility containing three hitting bays. The Rawls Course was designed by Tom Doak of Renaissance Golf Design, Inc., Traverse City, Michigan. Starting from just a cotton field, the course was created to imitate the land east and south of Lubbock, where the Great Plains suddenly begin falling into the valleys and canyons that lead to the Caprock region. Lubbock's strong prevailing winds figured prominently in the course's final design. Both Golf Week and Turfnet magazines ranked The Rawls Course as the third best collegiate course in the United States. Golf Magazine ranked it as the second most affordable U.S. course and placed it twenty-third on their list of top 50 golf courses in the nation for $50 or less.
