= 2017 NCAA Division I men's golf championship =

2017 NCAA Division I Men's Golf Championship
Tournament information
- Dates: May 26–31, 2017
- Location: Sugar Grove, Illinois, U.S.
- Course(s): Rich Harvest Farms (Northern Illinois University)

Statistics
- Field: 156 players, 30 teams

Champion
- Team: Oklahoma; Individual: Braden Thornberry (Mississippi)
- Team: 3.5–1.5 (def. Oregon); Individual: 277 (−11)

The 2017 NCAA Division I Men's Golf Championship was the 79th annual tournament to determine the national champions of NCAA Division I men's golf. It was contested from May 26 to 31 at the Rich Harvest Farms course in Sugar Grove, Illinois and hosted by Northern Illinois University. Oklahoma defeated defending champions Oregon, 3.5–1.5 and Braden Thornberry of Mississippi won the individual competition.

== Qualifying ==
- The five teams with the lowest team scores qualified from each of the six regional tournaments for both the team and individual national championships.
- The lowest scoring individual not affiliated with one of the qualified teams in their regional also qualified for the individual national championship.

=== Regional tournaments ===
Regional name	Golf course	Location	Qualified teams
Texas Regional	University of Texas Golf Club	Austin, Texas	Arizona State, Iowa State, Mississippi, Oklahoma State, Texas
Louisiana Regional	University Club	Baton Rouge, Louisiana	Duke, LSU, Jacksonville, Oregon, Virginia
Tennessee Regional	The Grove	College Grove, Tennessee	Central Florida, Clemson, Kennesaw State, Lipscomb, Vanderbilt
Washington Regional	Aldarra Golf Club	Sammamish, Washington	Alabama, Florida State, Kent State, Penn State, Southern California
California Regional	Stanford Golf Course	Stanford, California	Baylor, North Carolina, Oklahoma, Pepperdine, Stanford
Indiana Regional	Birck Boilermaker Golf Complex, Kampen Course	West Lafayette, Indiana	Auburn, Illinois, New Mexico, Purdue, UNLV

== Team competition ==
=== Leaderboard ===
Place	Team	Round 1	Round 2	Round 3	Round 4	Total	To par
1	Vanderbilt	278	288	280	293	1139	−13
2	Oklahoma	284	279	284	304	1151	−1
3	Illinois	282	283	285	304	1154	+2
4	Oklahoma State	282	287	283	303	1155	+3
T5	Oregon	294	282	289	293	1158	+6
T5	Southern California	284	283	280	311	1158	+6
T7	Baylor	288	280	287	304	1159	+7
T7	UNLV	283	279	285	312	1159	+7
9	LSU	291	277	290	303	1161	+9
10	Virginia	288	283	284	307	1162	+10
11	Auburn	282	284	290	308	1164	+12
12	Texas	293	283	283	307	1166	+14
13	Pepperdine	289	293	287	311	1180	+28
T14	Florida State	289	285	286	321	1181	+29
T14	Central Florida	294	284	293	310	1181	+29

Remaining teams: Arizona State (872), Alabama (873), Iowa State (875), North Carolina (875), Stanford (879), Kent State (881), Duke (888), Mississippi (888), Penn State (891), Lipscomb (891), Jacksonville (892), New Mexico (892), Purdue (902), Kennesaw State (904), Clemson (905).

After 54 holes, the field of 30 teams was cut to the top 15.

=== Match play bracket ===
- The eight teams with the lowest total scores advanced to the match play bracket.

Quarterfinals; May 30, morning
1	Vanderbilt	3
8	UNLV	2
4	Oklahoma State	2
5	Oregon	3
3	Illinois	3.5
6	Southern California	1.5
2	Oklahoma	3
7	Baylor	2

Semifinals; May 30, afternoon
1	Vanderbilt	2
5	Oregon	3
3	Illinois	1.5
2	Oklahoma	3.5

Final; May 31
5	Oregon	1.5
2	Oklahoma	3.5

== Individual competition ==
Place	Player	University	Score	To par
1	Braden Thornberry	Mississippi	66-71-69-71=277	−11
2	Mason Overstreet	Arkansas	70-68-72-71=281	−7
T3	Theo Humphrey	Vanderbilt	71-72-69-70=282	−6
T3	Scottie Scheffler	Texas	68-68-68-78=282	−6
T3	Matthias Schwab	Vanderbilt	67-70-70-75=282	−6
T6	Rico Hoey	USC	74-68-66-76=284	−4
T6	Dylan Meyer	Illinois	71-67-69-77=284	−4
T8	John Augenstein	Vanderbilt	74-70-69-72=285	−3
T8	Viktor Hovland	Oklahoma State	68-74-68-75=285	−3
T8	John Oda	UNLV	69-69-72-75=285	−3

The field was cut after 54 holes to the top 15 teams and the top nine individuals not on a top 15 team. These 84 players competed for the individual championship.
