= 1981 NCAA Division I golf championship =

1981 NCAA Division I Golf Championship
Tournament information
- Location: Stanford, California, U.S. 37.4216°N 122.1837°W
- Course: Stanford Golf Course

Statistics
- Field: 31 teams

Champion
- Team: BYU (1st title); Individual: Ron Commans, USC

Location map
- Location in the United States Location in California

The 1981 NCAA Division I Golf Championship was the 43rd annual NCAA-sanctioned golf tournament to determine the individual and team national champions of men's collegiate golf at the University Division level in the United States.

The tournament was held at the Stanford Golf Course in Stanford, California, hosted by Stanford University.

BYU won the team championship, the Cougars' first NCAA title.

Ron Commans, from USC, won the individual title.

== Individual results ==
=== Individual champion ===
- Ron Commans, USC

== Team results ==
| Rank | Team | Score |
|---|---|---|
| 1 | BYU | 1,161 |
| 2 | Oral Roberts | 1,163 |
| 3 | Houston | 1,170 |
| 4 | Oklahoma State | 1,171 |
| 5 | Arizona State | 1,172 |
| 6 | Georgia | 1,176 |
| T7 | New Mexico | 1,180 |
| T7 | Tennessee | 1,180 |
| 9 | Wake Forest | 1,182 |
| 10 | Texas A&M | 1,183 |
| T11 | Colorado | 1,185 |
| T11 | USC | 1,185 |
| 13 | Utah State | 1,186 |
| 14 | Florida | 1,188 |
| 15 | Florida State | 1,189 |
| 16 | Texas | 1,191 |

- DC = Defending champions
- Missed cut: Alabama, Fresno State, North Carolina, San Jose State, San Diego State, Centenary (LA), Stanford, Ohio State, LSU, Purdue, Oregon, New Mexico State, Temple, Oklahoma, Dartmouth
- Debut appearance
