= Matthias Schwab =

Austrian professional golfer

Personal information
- Nationality: Austria
- Born: 9 December 1994 (age 31) Schladming, Austria
- Height: 5 ft 11 in (180 cm)
- Weight: 161 lb (73 kg)

Career
- Sport: Golf
- College: Vanderbilt University
- Turned professional: 2017
- Current tour: European Tour
- Former tours: PGA Tour; Challenge Tour
- Highest ranking: 78 (26 January 2020) (as of 25 October 2026)

Best results in major championships
- Masters Tournament: DNP
- PGA Championship: CUT: 2020
- U.S. Open: CUT: 2020
- The Open Championship: CUT: 2021

Matthias Schwab (born 9 December 1994) is an Austrian professional golfer who plays on the European Tour and the PGA Tour. As a 17 year old, he finished runner-up at the 2012 Amateur Championship. On the 2019 European Tour, he finished 17th on the Race to Dubai rankings after 10 top-10 finishes, including two second-place finishes.

== Amateur career ==
Schwab had a successful amateur career. He reached the final of the 2012 Amateur Championship at Royal Troon Golf Club, losing to Alan Dunbar by 1 hole. He attended Vanderbilt University from 2013 to 2017. While at Vanderbilt he was joint third in the individual competition in both the 2016 and 2017 NCAA Division I Men's Golf Championships.

== Professional career ==
Schwab turned professional in June 2017 and played on the Challenge Tour for the rest of the year, finishing 33rd in the Order of Merit. In November 2017 Schwab became one of 33 players to earn 2018 European Tour cards through Q School.

Schwab played on the European Tour during 2018. He tied for fourth place in the Hero Indian Open in March and ended his rookie year 72nd on the Race to Dubai with seven top-10 finishes. On the 2019 European Tour, he finished second at the Porsche European Open, tied fourth at the Italian Open and lost in a playoff at the Turkish Airlines Open event to end 17th in the 2019 Race to Dubai rankings and moved to 80th on the Official World Golf Ranking. On 3 November 2019, at the WGC-HSBC Champions at the Sheshan International GC, Shanghai, China, he finished tied fourth, four strokes behind winner Rory McIlroy.

Schwab competed in the Men's individual event at the 2020 Summer Olympics, finishing tied-27th overall.

== Personal life ==
Schwab's father Andreas represented Austria in the bobsleigh event at the 1976 Winter Olympics.

== Amateur wins ==
- 2010 Austrian Amateur, Italian Under 16 Championship
- 2012 Slovenian International Amateur
- 2015 Mason Rudolph Championship, Swiss International Championship

== Playoff record ==
European Tour playoff record (0–1)

| No. | Year | Tournament | Opponents | Result |
|---|---|---|---|---|
| 1 | 2019 | Turkish Airlines Open | (England) Tyrrell Hatton, (France) Benjamin Hébert, (United States) Kurt Kitayama, (France) Victor Perez, (South Africa) Erik van Rooyen | Hatton won with par on fourth extra hole Kitayama eliminated by birdie on third hole Hébert, Perez and van Rooyen eliminated by birdie on first hole |

== Results in major championships ==
Results not in chronological order in 2020.

| Tournament | 2020 | 2021 |
|---|---|---|
| Masters Tournament | | |
| PGA Championship | CUT | |
| U.S. Open | CUT | |
| The Open Championship | NT | CUT |

Did not play

CUT = missed the half-way cut
NT = No tournament due to COVID-19 pandemic

== Results in The Players Championship ==
| Tournament | 2023 |
|---|---|
| The Players Championship | T54 |

"T" indicates a tie for a place

== Results in World Golf Championships ==
| Tournament | 2019 | 2020 |
|---|---|---|
| Championship | | T42 |
| Match Play | | NT^{1} |
| Invitational | | |
| Champions | T4 | NT^{1} |

^{1}Cancelled due to COVID-19 pandemic

Top 10
Did not play

NT = No tournament
"T" = Tied

== Team appearances ==
Amateur

- European Boys' Team Championship (representing Austria): 2010, 2011, 2012
- Jacques Léglise Trophy (representing the Continent of Europe): 2012
- Junior Ryder Cup (representing Europe): 2012
- European Amateur Team Championship (representing Austria): 2013, 2016
- Arnold Palmer Cup (representing Europe): 2015, 2016 (winners)
- St Andrews Trophy (representing the Continent of Europe): 2016
- Eisenhower Trophy (representing Austria): 2016

== See also ==
- 2017 European Tour Qualifying School graduates
- 2021 Korn Ferry Tour Finals graduates
