= 1971 NCAA University Division golf championship =

1971 NCAA University Division Golf Championship
Tournament information
- Location: Tucson, Arizona, U.S. 32.3583°N 111.0253°W
- Course: Tucson National Golf Club

Statistics
- Field: 16 teams

Champion
- Team: Texas (1st title); Individual: Ben Crenshaw, Texas

Location map
- Location in the United States Location in Arizona

The 1971 NCAA University Division Golf Championship was the 33rd annual NCAA-sanctioned golf tournament to determine the individual and team national champions of men's collegiate golf in the United States.

The tournament was held at the Tucson National Golf Club in Tucson, Arizona.

Texas won the team title, the Longhorns' first NCAA team national title.

== Individual results ==
=== Individual champion ===
- Ben Crenshaw, Texas

== Team results ==
Rank	Team	Score
1	Texas	1,144
2	Houston (DC)	1,151
3	Florida	1,154
4	Wake Forest	1,155
5	Oklahoma State	1,170
6	USC	1,171
7	BYU	1,173
8	Stanford	1,174
T9	Georgia	1,176
T9	Maryland	1,176

- Note: Top 10 only
- DC = Defending champions
- First time qualifiers: Long Beach State
