= 1962 NCAA golf championship =

1962 NCAA Golf Championship
Tournament information
- Location: Durham, North Carolina, U.S. 35.9927°N 78.9471°W
- Course: Duke Golf Club

Statistics
- Field: 15 teams

Champion
- Team: Houston (6th title); Individual: Kermit Zarley, Houston

Location map
- Location in the United States Location in North Carolina

The 1962 NCAA Golf Championship was the 24th annual NCAA-sanctioned golf tournament to determine the individual and team national champions of men's collegiate golf in the United States.

The tournament was held at the Duke Golf Club at Duke University in Durham, North Carolina.

Houston won the team title, the Cougars' sixth NCAA team national title and sixth in seven years.

== Individual results ==
=== Individual champion ===
- Kermit Zarley, Houston

=== Tournament medalist ===
- Kermit Zarley, Houston (140)

== Team results ==
Rank	Team	Score
1	Houston	588
2	Oklahoma State	598
3	Duke	603
4	North Texas State	606
5	Georgia	607
6	Purdue (DC)	611
7	Stanford	617
8	Wake Forest	619
9	Minnesota	620
10	USC	622

- Note: Top 10 only
- DC = Defending champions
