= 1966 NCAA University Division golf championship =

1966 NCAA University Division Golf Championship
Tournament information
- Location: Stanford, California, U.S. 37.4216°N 122.1837°W
- Course: Stanford Golf Course

Statistics
- Field: 31 teams

Champion
- Team: Houston (9th title); Individual: Bob Murphy, Florida

Location map
- Location in the United States Location in California

The 1966 NCAA University Division Golf Championship was the 28th annual NCAA-sanctioned golf tournament to determine the individual and team national champions of men's collegiate golf in the United States.

The tournament was held at the Stanford Golf Course in Stanford, California, hosted by Stanford University.

Two-time defending champions Houston won the team title, the Cougars' ninth NCAA team national title.

== Individual results ==
=== Individual champion ===
- Bob Murphy, Florida

== Team results ==
Rank	Team	Score
1	Houston (DC)	582
2	San José State	586
3	USC	595
4	Oklahoma State	598
5	Arizona State	599
6	San Diego State	604
7	Stanford	606
T8	Cal State Los Angeles	607
T8	LSU	607
T8	UCLA	607

- Note: Top 10 only
- DC = Defending champions
