= 1964 NCAA University Division golf championship =

1964 NCAA University Division Golf Championship
Tournament information
- Location: Colorado Springs, Colorado, U.S. 38.7911°N 104.8502°W
- Course: Broadmoor Golf Club

Statistics
- Field: 41 teams

Champion
- Team: Houston (7th title); Individual: Terry Small, San José State

Location map
- Location in the United States Location in Colorado

The 1964 NCAA University Division Golf Championship was the 26th annual NCAA-sanctioned golf tournament to determine the individual and team national champions of men's collegiate golf in the United States.

The tournament was held at the Broadmoor Golf Club at The Broadmoor resort in Colorado Springs, Colorado.

Houston won the team title, the Cougars' seventh NCAA team national title.

After 1964, the NCAA would switch the tournament format from match play to stroke play. The NCAA would also stop awarding a tournament medalist.

== Individual results ==
=== Individual champion ===
- Terry Small, San José State

=== Tournament medalist ===
- Jerry Potter, Miami (FL) (139)

== Team results ==
| Rank | Team | Score |
|---|---|---|
| 1 | Houston | 580 |
| 2 | Oklahoma State (DC) | 587 |
| 3 | USC | 596 |
| T4 | Notre Dame | 600 |
| T4 | San José State | 600 |
| 6 | Miami (FL) | 603 |
| 7 | Wake Forest | 607 |
| 8 | Stanford | 610 |
| 9 | Indiana | 611 |
| 10 | UCLA | 612 |

- Note: Top 10 only
- DC = Defending champions
