= 1957 NCAA golf championship =

1957 NCAA Golf Championship
Tournament information
- Location: Colorado Springs, Colorado, U.S. 38.7911°N 104.8502°W
- Course: The Broadmoor

Statistics
- Field: 26 teams

Champion
- Team: Houston (2nd title); Individual: Rex Baxter, Houston

Location map
- Location in the United States Location in Colorado

The 1957 NCAA Golf Championship was the 19th annual NCAA-sanctioned golf tournament to determine the individual and team national champions of men's collegiate golf in the United States.

The tournament was held at The Broadmoor in Colorado Springs, Colorado.

Defending champions Houston won the team title, the Cougars' second NCAA team national title.

== Individual results ==
=== Individual champion ===
- Rex Baxter, Houston

=== Tournament medalists ===
- Roger Rubendall, Wisconsin (139)
- Warren Simmons, Syracuse (139)

== Team results ==
Rank	Team	Score
1	Houston (DC)	602
2	Stanford	603
3	North Texas State	606
4	Florida State	607
5	Arizona State	609
6	SMU	610
7	North Carolina	611
T8	Iowa	614
T8	Navy	614
T8	San Jose State	614

- Note: Top 10 only
- DC = Defending champions
