= Veenker Memorial Golf Course =

Golf course in Ames, Iowa

Coordinates: 42°02′23″N 93°39′09″W

Veenker Memorial Golf Course is a public golf course which is owned and operated by Iowa State University. The golf course was completed in 1938 and it has hosted the Iowa Master's golf tournament since then. In 1959 the course was renamed for George F. Veenker, who was the head football coach at Iowa State from 1931 to 1936. In 2003 Veenker was ranked among "America's Best State Public Access Courses" by Golfweek magazine.
