= 1965 NCAA University Division golf championship =

1965 NCAA University Division Golf Championship
Tournament information
- Location: Knoxville, Tennessee, U.S. 35.992222°N 83.835278°W
- Courses: Holston Hills Country Club (University of Tennessee)

Statistics
- Field: 33 teams

Champion
- Team: Houston (8th title); Individual: Marty Fleckman, Houston

Location map
- Location in the United States Location in Tennessee

The 1965 NCAA University Division Golf Championship was the 27th annual NCAA-sanctioned golf tournament to determine the individual and team national champions of men's collegiate golf in the United States.

The tournament was held at the Holston Hills Country Club in Knoxville, Tennessee, hosted by the University of Tennessee.

Defending champions Houston won the team title, the Cougars' eighth NCAA team national title.

This was the first NCAA tournament decided by stroke play and the first without a tournament medalist.

== Individual results ==
=== Individual champion ===
- Marty Fleckman, Houston

== Team results ==
Rank	Team	Score
1	Houston (DC)	577
2	Cal State Los Angeles	587
3	USC	590
T4	Florida	594
T4	Purdue	594
6	Florida State	595
T7	Georgia	596
T7	San José State	596
T9	Arizona State	597
T9	Oklahoma State	597

- Note: Top 10 only
- DC = Defending champions
