= 1952 NCAA golf championship =

1952 NCAA Golf Championship
Tournament information
- Location: West Lafayette, Indiana, U.S. 40.441944°N 86.9125°W
- Course: Purdue University Golf Course

Statistics
- Field: 24 teams

Champion
- Team: North Texas State (4th title); Individual: Jim Vickers (Oklahoma)

Location map
- Location in the United States Location in Indiana

The 1952 NCAA Golf Championship was the 14th annual NCAA-sanctioned golf tournament to determine the individual and team national champions of men's collegiate golf in the United States.

The tournament was held at the Purdue University Golf Course in West Lafayette, Indiana.

Three-time defending champions North Texas State again won the team title, the Eagles' fourth NCAA team national title.

== Individual results ==
=== Individual champion ===
- Jim Vickers, Oklahoma

=== Tournament medalist ===
- Paul Harney, Holy Cross (140)

== Team results ==
Rank	Team	Score
1	North Texas State (DC)	587
2	Michigan	593
T3	Purdue	598
T3	Texas	598
5	Oklahoma A&M	600
6	USC	601
7	LSU	602
8	Stanford	608
9	Florida	610
10	North Carolina	611

- Note: Top 10 only
- DC = Defending champions
