= 1972 NCAA University Division golf championship =

1972 NCAA University Division Golf Championship
Tournament information
- Location: Cape Coral, Florida, U.S. 26.622595°N 82.035448°W
- Course: Cape Coral Golf Club

Statistics
- Field: 15 teams

Champion
- Team: Texas (2nd title); Individual: Ben Crenshaw, Texas and Tom Kite, Texas

Location map
- Location in the United States Location in Florida

The 1972 NCAA University Division Golf Championship was the 34th annual NCAA-sanctioned golf tournament to determine the individual and team national champions of men's collegiate golf in the United States.

The tournament was held at the Cape Coral Golf Club in Cape Coral, Florida.

Defending champions Texas won the team championship, the Longhorns' second NCAA title.

== Individual results ==
=== Individual champions ===
- Ben Crenshaw, Texas
- Tom Kite, Texas

== Team results ==
Rank	Team	Score
1	Texas (DC)	1,146
2	Houston	1,159
3	Florida	1,167
4	Oklahoma State	1,174
5	Arizona State	1,176
T6	Georgia	1,185
T6	Wake Forest	1,185
8	SMU	1,193
9	San Jose State	1,200
T10	Maryland	1,207
T10	Miami (FL)	1,207

- Note: Top 10 only
- DC = Defending champions
- First time qualifiers: Georgia Southern
