= 2008 NCAA Division I men's golf championship =

2008 NCAA Division I Men's Golf Championship
Tournament information
- Dates: May 28–31, 2008
- Location: West Lafayette, Indiana, U.S. 40.438219°N 86.926209°W
- Courses: Birck Boilermaker Golf Complex; Kampen Course

Statistics
- Par: 72
- Length: 7,450 yards
- Field: 156 players, 30 teams
- Cut: 224 (individual); 913 (team)

Champion
- Team: UCLA; Individual: Kevin Chappell, UCLA
- Team: 1,194 (+42); Individual: 286 (−2)

Location map
- Location in the United States Location in Indiana

The 2008 NCAA Division I Men's Golf Championship was a golf tournament contested from May 28 to May 31, 2008, at the Birck Boilermaker Golf Complex in West Lafayette, Indiana. It was the 70th NCAA Division I Men's Golf Championship, and was hosted by Purdue University. The team championship was won by the UCLA Bruins who captured their second national championship by one stroke over the defending champion Stanford Cardinal in stroke play. The individual national championship was won by Kevin Chappell, also from UCLA.

== Venue ==
The tournament was played on the Kampen Course of the Birck Boilermaker Golf Complex. This was the third NCAA Division I Men's Golf Championship hosted by Purdue University on their campus golf courses in West Lafayette, Indiana; Purdue previously hosted in 1952 and 1961. The Kampen Course was redesigned in 1998 by golf course architect Pete Dye.
