= 2012 NCAA Division I men's golf championship =

Coordinates: 34.0500°N 118.5015°W

2012 NCAA Division I Men's Golf Championship
Tournament information
- Dates: May 29 – June 3, 2012
- Location: Pacific Palisades, California, U.S.
- Course(s): Riviera Country Club

Statistics
- Par: 71
- Length: 7,292 yards (6,668 m)
- Field: 156 players, 30 teams

Champion
- Team: Texas; Individual: Thomas Pieters, Illinois
- Team: 3–2 (def. Alabama); Individual: 208 (−5)

The 2012 NCAA Division I Men's Golf Championship was a golf tournament contested from May 29–June 3 at the Riviera Country Club in Pacific Palisades, California. It was the 74th NCAA Division I Men's Golf Championship. The team championship was won by the Texas Longhorns who won their third national championship by defeating the Alabama Crimson Tide in the championship match play round 3–2. The individual national championship was won by Thomas Pieters from the University of Illinois.

== Regional qualifying tournaments ==
- Five teams qualified from each of the six regional tournaments held around the country from May 17 to May 19, 2012.

Regional name	Golf course	Location
Southeast Regional	University of Georgia Golf Course	Athens, Georgia
East Regional	Grandover Resort, East Course	Greensboro, North Carolina
Central Regional	University of Michigan Golf Course	Ann Arbor, Michigan
South Central Regional	The Club at Olde Stone	Bowling Green, Kentucky
South Regional	Jimmie Austin Oklahoma University Golf Club	Norman, Oklahoma
West Regional	Stanford University Golf Course	Stanford, California

== Venue ==
This was the first NCAA Division I Men's Golf Championship held at the Riviera Country Club in Pacific Palisades, California.

== Team competition ==
=== Leaderboard ===
- Par, single-round: 284
- Par, total: 852

Place	Team	Round 1	Round 2	Round 3	Total
1	Alabama	285	287	287	859
2	UCLA	289	287	285	861
3	Texas	290	295	284	869
T4	California	295	289	287	871
T4	San Diego State	292	295	284	871
6	Washington	296	286	290	872
7	Oregon	291	294	288	873
T8	Kent State	293	291	291	875
T8	Florida State	290	290	295	875
10	Liberty	295	288	293	876

- Kent State won the eighth place playoff tie-breaker with Florida State, +2 to +3.
- Remaining Teams: Oklahoma (877), Florida (878), North Florida (878), Texas A&M (879), Auburn (880), USC (880), Georgia (881), Chattanooga (884), UCF (885), Stanford (885), Illinois (887), Iowa (888), Virginia (888), Virginia Tech (890), Lamar (892), East Carolina (895), TCU (897), Memphis (901), UAB (902), Tulsa (918)

=== Match play bracket ===
Quarterfinal round June 1
1	Alabama	3
8	Kent State	1
4	California	3
5	San Diego State	2
3	Texas	5
6	Washington	0
2	UCLA	2
7	Oregon	3

Semifinal round June 2
1	Alabama	3
4	California	2
3	Texas	3
7	Oregon	2

Final round June 3
1	Alabama	2
3	Texas	3

== Individual competition ==
- Par, single-round: 71
- Par, total: 213

Place	Player	University	Score	To par
1	Thomas Pieters	Illinois	69-68-71=208	−5
T2	Julien Brun	TCU	72-72-67=211	−2
T2	Tyler McCumber	Florida	68-71-72=211	−2
T4	Patrick Cantlay	UCLA	74-72-66=212	−1
T4	Corey Conners	Kent State	68-75-69=212	−1
T4	Cory Whitsett	Alabama	73-68-71=212	−1
T7	Blayne Barber	Auburn	69-74-70=213	E
T7	Justin Thomas	Alabama	70-70-73=213	E
T9	Max Homa	California	76-70-68=214	+1
T9	William Kropp	Oklahoma	69-75-70=214	+1
T9	Keith Mitchell	Georgia	73-72-69=214	+1
T9	Patrick Rodgers	Stanford	69-72-73=214	+1
