= Ohio State University Golf Club =

Golf club in Columbus, Ohio, United States

Coordinates: 40.031886°N 83.052349°W

The Ohio State University Golf Club
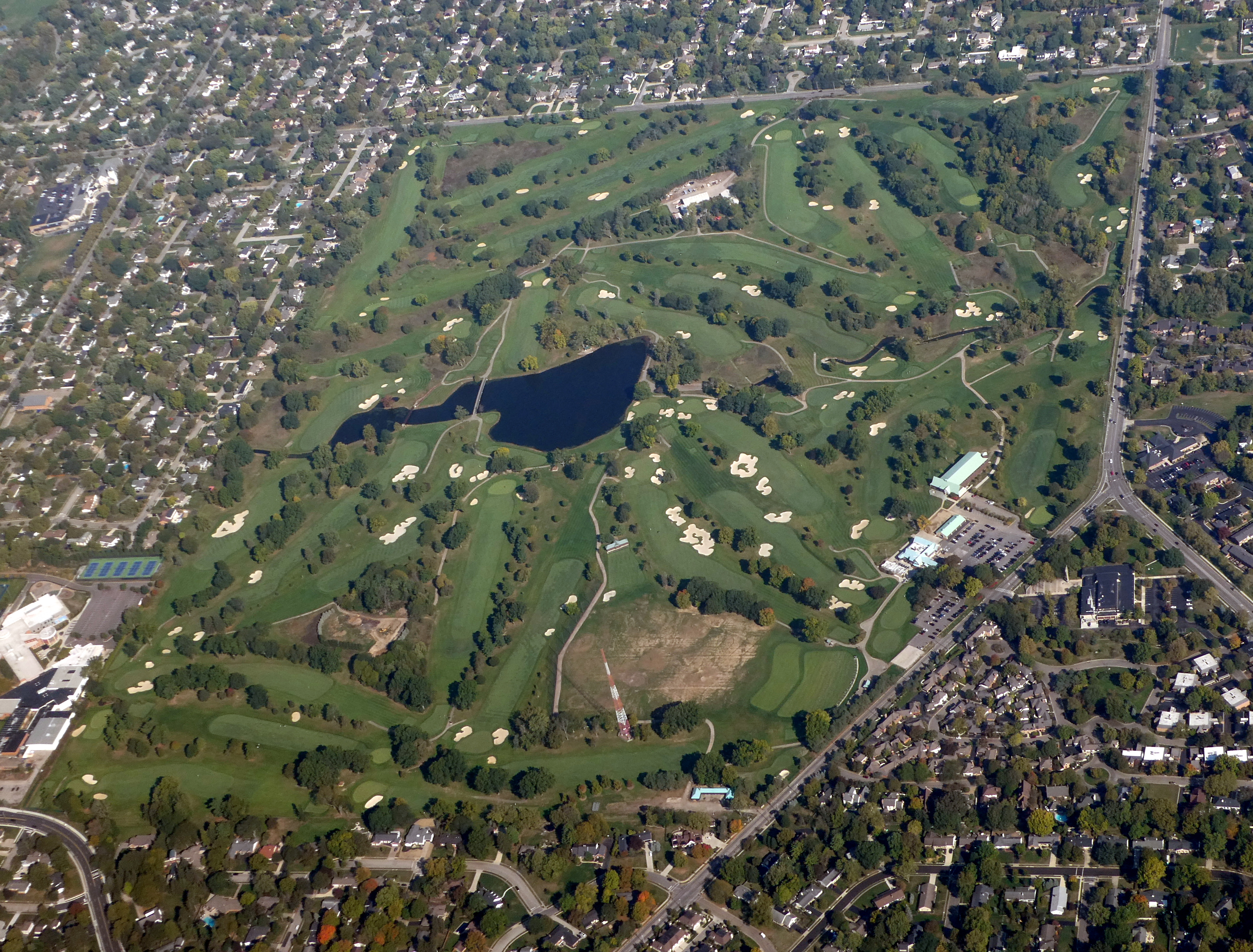

Club information
- Location: Upper Arlington, near Columbus, Ohio (United States)
- Established: 1940
- Type: Private
- Owner: Ohio State University
- Tota holes: 36
- Tournaments: Nationwide Children's Hospital Invitational
- Website: Official site

Scarlet
- Designed by: Alister MacKenzie
- Par: 71
- Length: 7455
- Course rating: 76.2
- Slope rating: 138

Gray
- Designed by: Alister MacKenzie
- Par: 71
- Length: 5800
- Course rating: 66.6
- Slope rating: 111

The Ohio State University Golf Club is located in Upper Arlington, Ohio, a suburb of Columbus. It was founded by L.W. St. John, (Ohio State University Athletic Director, 1912–1947). The golf club has two 18-hole golf courses: Scarlet and Gray. The Scarlet was completed in 1938 and the Gray was finished later in 1940. The dedication ceremony was held on May 18, 1940, when Bob Kepler (golf coach from 1938 to 1965), Chick Evans, Blanche Sohl, and Patty Berg played 18 holes on the Scarlet course.

Both the Scarlet and the much shorter Gray golf courses were designed by golf course architect Alister MacKenzie. In 2005 and 2006, the Scarlet Course underwent a major restoration project overseen by Jack Nicklaus that was intended to restore play on the Scarlet course to the way that MacKenzie had envisioned it.

In 1941, the first women's collegiate golf championship was played on the Scarlet course. In 1982, Ohio State hosted the final Association for Intercollegiate Athletics for Women (AIAW) Division I National Championship. In 1991, Ohio State hosted the NCAA Women's Championship, commemorating the 50th Anniversary of the national tournament for women on the course on which it was conceived. The women's program later went on to host the 1997 and 2006 tournaments as well. The Scarlet Course has also played host to 10 men's National Championships. The Scarlet course has been the site of several U.S. Open qualifiers, U.S. Amateur qualifiers and the 1977 USGA Junior Championship.
