= Illinois Fighting Illini men's golf =

- Founded: 1908
- University: University of Illinois at Urbana–Champaign
- Conference: Big Ten
- Head coach: Men's: Mike Small (22nd season)
- Location: Urbana, Illinois
- Course: Atkins Golf Club; Par: 72; Yards: 7,118
- Nickname: Fighting Illini
- Colors: Orange and blue

NCAA individual champions
- Scott Langley (2010); Thomas Pieters (2012)

NCAA runner-up
- 2013

NCAA match play
- 2011, 2013, 2014, 2015, 2016, 2017, 2021, 2023, 2024

NCAA Championship appearances
- 1940, 1941, 1949, 1950, 1951, 1956, 1957, 1961, 1984, 1988, 1989, 1999, 2002, 2003, 2008, 2009, 2010, 2011, 2012, 2013, 2014, 2015, 2016, 2017, 2018, 2019, 2021, 2023, 2024, 2025

Conference champions
- 1923, 1927, 1930, 1931, 1940, 1941, 1988, 2009, 2010, 2011, 2012, 2013, 2015, 2016, 2017, 2018, 2019, 2021, 2022, 2023

Individual conference champions
- R.E. Rolfe (1923); Richard Martin (1930, 1931); Alex Welsh (1941); James McCarthy (1942); Mike Toluiuszis (1962); Mike Chadwick (1982); Steve Stricker (1986, 1988, 1989); Jamie Fairbanks (1993); Larry Nuger (1999); Luke Guthrie (2011, 2012); Thomas Pieters (2013); Charlie Danielson (2014); Nick Hardy (2015, 2018); Thomas Detry (2016); Dylan Meyer (2017); Adrien Dumont de Chassart (2019)

The Illinois Fighting Illini men's golf team represents the University of Illinois at Urbana–Champaign in the sport of golf. The Fighting Illini compete in Division I of the National Collegiate Athletic Association (NCAA) and the Big Ten Conference (Big Ten). They play their home matches at the Atkins Golf Club, which is located five miles from the university's campus. The Fighting Illini are currently led by head coach Mike Small. The Fighting Illini men's golf program has won 20 Big Ten championships and in 2013 finished as national runner-up at the NCAA Division I Men's Golf Championships, which was the highest finish in the program's history. The Fighting Illini have qualified for the match play portion of the NCAA Championship 9 times since the stroke play/match play format was introduced in 2009, and reached the Final Four in 2013, 2015, 2016 and 2017.

The Fighting Illini have won 13 of the last 16 Big Ten Golf Championships. Illinois golfers won the Big Ten Individual Conference Title for nine consecutive seasons (2011−2019).

== Individual honors ==
=== National champions ===
- Scott Langley − 2010
- Thomas Pieters − 2012

=== All-Americans ===
- Joe Burden – 1972 (HM)
- Marty Schiene – 1979 (HM)
- Mike Chadwick – 1983 (HM)
- Steve Stricker – 1987 (HM), 1988 (1st), 1989 (1st)
- D. A. Points – 1999 (3rd)
- James Lepp – 2002 (HM), 2003 (2nd)
- Patrick Nagle – 2003 (3rd)
- Scott Langley – 2009 (2nd), 2010 (1st), 2011 (HM)
- Chris DeForest – 2011 (HM)
- Luke Guthrie – 2011 (1st), 2012 (2nd)
- Thomas Pieters – 2012 (1st), 2013 (HM)
- Charlie Danielson – 2013 (HM), 2014 (HM), 2015 (2nd), 2016 (1st)
- Thomas Detry – 2014 (HM), 2015 (2nd), 2016 (2nd)
- Brian Campbell – 2014 (2nd), 2015 (2nd)
- Dylan Meyer – 2016 (HM), 2017 (1st), 2018 (2nd)
- Nick Hardy – 2017 (2nd), 2018 (1st)
- Michael Feagles – 2019 (HM), 2021 (2nd)
- Jerry Ji – 2021 (HM)
- Adrien Dumont de Chassart – 2021 (2nd), 2022 (2nd), 2023 (1st)
- Tommy Kuhl - 2023 (1st)
- Jackson Buchanan - 2023 (1st)

Note: 1st = first team, 2nd = second team, 3rd = third team, HM = honorable mention

=== Other ===
Since 1923, sixteen Fighting Illini golfers have won twenty-one Big Ten individual titles. Thirty-nine Fighting Illini golfers have received All-Big Ten honors.

== Coaching staff ==
Mike Small is the head coach of the Illinois Fighting Illini men's golf team, and 2022-2023 will be his 22nd season with the Fighting Illini. He has been named Big Ten Conference Coach of the Year a record thirteen times and is also an eleven time NCAA Regional Coach of the Year as named by the Golf Coaches Association of America. As a professional, Small is a record-tying three time PGA Professional National Champion and has won the Illinois PGA Championship a record-setting twelve times.

== Notable alumni ==
- Adrien Dumont de Chassart
- Luke Guthrie
- Nick Hardy
- Scott Langley
- Dylan Meyer
- Thomas Pieters
- D. A. Points
- Steve Stricker
- Thomas Detry

== Facilities ==
=== Demirjian Indoor Golf Practice Facility ===
Opened in 2007, the university's $5.2 million, 14,150-square-foot Demirjian Indoor Golf Practice Facility features a 6,300-square-foot putting, chipping, and pitching area that includes sand bunkers and different strains of artificial grass, six heated hitting bays which open onto the range, team locker rooms, coaches offices and a team lounge. Prior to the completion of the Demirjian Indoor Golf Practice Facility, indoor practice's were typically held in the basement of Huff Hall on an old handball court. In 2008, the facility received an Honor Award from the American Institute of Architects Illinois Chapter in the Architecture Design Award Category.

=== Lauritsen/Wohlers Outdoor Golf Practice Facility ===
Construction on the $2 million, 24 acre facility began during the summer of 2014, with a completion date in fall of 2014. Taking inspiration from the Augusta National Golf Club practice facility, the Lauritsen/Wohlers Outdoor Golf Practice Facility was designed by Fighting Illini head coach Mike Small, former Fighting Illini and PGA Tour professional Steve Stricker, and golf course architect Jeff Brauer. Training center with target fairways, target greens, fairway and greenside bunkers, putting greens, chipping greens and a wedge area The outdoor facility is located directly adjacent to the Demirjian Indoor Practice Building.

=== Atkins Golf Club ===
The Fighting Illini men's golf team host its home matches at the Atkins Golf Club, located in Urbana, Illinois 5 miles (8.0 km) southeast of the university's campus. The university course was originally designed by noted golf course architect Dick Nugent and his son Tim in 1999. The course is a 7,118-yard par 72, and the facilities include a practice and teaching center for the surrounding community. The Atkins Golf Club has hosted several Big Ten Conference men's and women's golf championships. Originally named Stone Creek Golf Club, the course was gifted to the University of Illinois Division of Intercollegiate Athletics by The Atkins Group and renamed to the Atkins Golf Club on June 30, 2020.
