= BYU Cougars men's golf =

NCAA Division I team

- University: Brigham Young University
- Conference: Big 12 Conference
- Athletic director: Brian Santiago
- Head coach: Bruce Brockbank (27th season)
- Location: Provo, Utah
- Course: Riverside Country Club; Par: 72; Yards: 7,001
- Nickname: Cougars
- Colors: Blue and white

NCAA champions
- 1981

NCAA runner-up
- 1976, 1980

NCAA Championship appearances
- 1966, 1969, 1970, 1971, 1972, 1973, 1974, 1975, 1976, 1977, 1978, 1979, 1980, 1981, 1982, 1983, 1984, 1985, 1986, 1987, 1991, 1993, 1999, 2000, 2004, 2005, 2006, 2018, 2019, 2022, 2023, 2025

Conference champions
- Western Athletic Conference; 1966, 1968, 1970, 1972, 1973, 1974, 1975, 1976, 1977, 1980, 1981, 1982, 1983, 1984, 1986, 1987, 1990, 1991, 1992, 1995, 1999; Mountain West Conference; 2001, 2007; West Coast Conference; 2014, 2017, 2023

Individual conference champions
- Mike Taylor (1966); Chip Garris (1970); Joey Dills (1972); Jimmy Blair (1974, 1976); Mike Reid (1975); Jamie Edman (1977); Bobby Clampett (1979, 1980); Rick Fehr (1982, 1984); Robert Meyer (1983); Dean Wilson (1991); Todd Pence (1995); Andy Miller (1997); Manuel Merizalde (1999); Nick Becker (2005); Peter Kuest (2017); Zac Jones (2023)

The BYU Cougars men's golf team represents the Brigham Young University in the sport of golf. The Cougars compete in Division I of the National Collegiate Athletic Association (NCAA) and the Big 12 Conference. They play their home matches on the Riverside Country Club Golf Course, and are currently led by head coach Bruce Brockbank. The Cougars men's golf program has won 26 conference championships: 21 Western Athletic Conference, two Mountain West Conference, and three West Coast Conference. In 1981, they won the NCAA Division I Championship.

== Individual honors ==
=== All-Americans ===
- Mike Taylor – 1966 (HM)
- Johnny Miller – 1966 (HM), 1967 (1st)
- Lane Bennett – 1969 (HM)
- Ray Leach – 1969 (3rd)
- Chip Garriss – 1970 (HM)
- Ray Leach – 1970 (2nd), 1971 (1st), 1972 (2nd)
- Dave Shipley – 1971 (3rd)
- Joey Dills – 1972 (HM), 1973 (HM), 1974 (HM)
- Mike Reid – 1973 (HM), 1974 (1st), 1975 (1st), 1976 (2nd)
- Lance Suzuki – 1973 (1st)
- Jimmy Blair – 1974 (HM), 1976 (HM)
- Mike Brannan – 1975 (3rd), 1976 (1st), 1977 (3rd), 1978 (3rd)
- John Fought – 1976 (3rd)
- Jim Nelford – 1976 (2nd), 1977 (2nd)
- Jamie Edman – 1977 (HM)
- Pat McGowan – 1977 (2nd)
- Stan Souza – 1978 (HM)
- Bobby Clampett – 1978 (1st), 1979 (1st), 1980 (1st)
- Dave DeSantis – 1979 (HM)
- Richard Zokol – 1980 (HM), 1981 (2nd)
- Tom Costello – 1980 (HM)
- Barry Willardson – 1980 (3rd), 1981 (3rd), 1982 (3rd)
- Keith Clearwater – 1981 (1st), 1982 (2nd)
- Rick Fehr – 1982 (1st), 1983 (2nd), 1984 (1st)
- Keith Goyan – 1983 (HM)
- Robert Meyer – 1983 (3rd), 1984 (2nd)
- Eduardo Herrera – 1984 (HM), 1986 (2nd), 1987 (2nd)
- Rick Gibson – 1984 (3rd)
- Brent Franklin – 1985 (HM), 1986 (1st), 1987 (2nd)
- Steve Schneiter – 1987 (HM)
- Bruce Brockbank – 1988 (3rd)
- Ramon Brobio – 1990 (HM)
- Mike Weir – 1992 (2nd)
- Eric S. Rustand – 1994 (HM)
- Todd Pence – 1995 (HM)
- Andy Miller – 1997 (3rd), 1998 (2nd), 1999 (2nd), 2000 (2nd)
- Bill Harvey – 1999 (HM)
- Jose Garrido – 1999 (HM)
- Manuel Merizalde – 2000 (HM), 2001 (3rd)
- Jake Ellison – 2004 (HM)
- Todd Miller – 2004 (HM)
- Óscar David Álvarez – 2004 (HM), 2005 (2nd)
- Daniel Summerhays – 2006 (HM), 2007 (1st)
- Jake Ellison – 2006 (HM)
- Robbie Fillmore – 2010 (HM)
- Zac Blair – 2012 (3rd)
- Patrick Fishburn – 2018 (3rd)
- Rhett Rasmussen – 2019 (HM)
- Peter Kuest – 2019 (2nd)
- Carson Lundell – 2021 (HM)
- Carson Lundell – 2022 (HM)

Note: 1st = first team, 2nd = second team, 3rd = third team, HM = honorable mention

=== Haskins Award ===
- Bobby Clampett — 1979, 1980

== Other notable alumni ==
- Buddy Allin
- Brad Sutterfield
- Mitch Voges
- Dean Wilson
