= Houston Cougars golf =

Golf team of the University of Houston

- University: University of Houston
- Conference: Big 12 Conference
- Head coach: Men's: Andrew Danna (1st season); Women's: Rachel Pollock (1st season)
- Location: Houston, Texas
- Course: Golf Club of Houston; Par: 72; Yards: 7,422
- Nickname: Cougars
- Colors: Scarlet and white

NCAA champions
- Men: 1956, 1957, 1958, 1959, 1960, 1962, 1964, 1965, 1966, 1967, 1969, 1970, 1977, 1982, 1984, 1985

NCAA individual champions
- Men: Rex Baxter (1957); Phil Rodgers (1958); Richard Crawford (1959, 1960); Kermit Zarley (1962); Marty Fleckman (1965); John Mahaffey (1970); Billy Ray Brown (1982)

NCAA runner-up
- Men: 1963, 1968, 1971, 1972

NCAA Championship appearances
- Men: 1952, 1953, 1954, 1955, 1956, 1957, 1958, 1959, 1960, 1961, 1962, 1963, 1964, 1965, 1966, 1967, 1968, 1969, 1970, 1971, 1972, 1973, 1974, 1975, 1976, 1977, 1978, 1979, 1980, 1981, 1982, 1983, 1984, 1985, 1986, 1987, 1989, 1992, 1994, 1995, 1997, 1998, 1999, 2000, 2001, 2014, 2015, 2016; Women: 2026

Conference champions
- Men: Missouri Valley: 1956, 1957, 1958, 1959, 1960; Southwest: 1974, 1975, 1976, 1977, 1978, 1979, 1980, 1984, 1985; C-USA: 1997, 1998, 1999, 2000, 2001, 2013; The American: 2023 Women: The American: 2016, 2018, 2019

Individual conference champions
- Missouri Valley; Men: Rex Baxter (1956, 1957); Phil Rodgers (1958); Jacky Cupit (1959, 1960) Southwest; Men: Keith Fergus (1974, 1976); Ed Fiori (1977); Terry Snodgrass (1978); Fred Couples (1979); Ray Barr (1980, 1981); John Slaughter (1984); Steve Elkington (1984, 1985); Tray Tyner (1987); Lance Combrink (1995) C-USA; Men: Andy Sanders (1999, 2000); Brad McIntosh (2001); Roman Robledo (2013) The American; Men: Michael Perras (2017); Santiago de la Fuente (2023); Women: Leonie Harm (2019)

The Houston Cougars golf program is an NCAA Division I golf program at the University of Houston. The men's program, under head coach Andrew Danna, and the women's program, coached by Rachel Pollock, both compete in the Big 12 Conference.

The men's golf program is one of the oldest sports played at the University of Houston, as it began in 1946 along with the football program. The team is one of the most successful college programs in history, with 16 team national championships and eight individual national championships. This makes the team the second-most successful team of all time, behind only Yale. The team also holds 21 conference championships and has produced 44 All-Americans.

Team members who went on to professional golf careers include Fuzzy Zoeller, Fred Couples, Steve Elkington, Nick Faldo, Butch Harmon, Bruce Lietzke, Billy Tuten, John Mahaffey, Bill Rogers, Blaine McCallister, Dave Marr, Fred Marti and Billy Ray Brown. Future broadcaster Jim Nantz was also a member of the team.

The women's golf program began in 2013.
