= Kent State Golden Flashes men's golf =

Intercollegiate men's golf team from Kent State University

- University: Kent State University
- Conference: Mid-American Conference
- Head coach: Jon Mills (6th season)
- Location: Kent, Ohio, U.S.
- Course: Windmill Lakes
- Nickname: Golden Flashes
- Colors: Navy blue and gold

NCAA match play
- 2012

NCAA Championship appearances
- 1947, 1949, 1951, 1954, 1984, 1987, 1990, 1992, 1993, 1994, 1995, 1998, 2000, 2001, 2004, 2008, 2010, 2011, 2012, 2013, 2017, 2018

Conference champions
- Ohio Athletic Conference; 1934, 1950 Mid-American Conference; 1954, 1968, 1977, 1984, 1992, 1993, 1994, 1995, 1997, 1998, 1999, 2000, 2001, 2003, 2005, 2006, 2009, 2010, 2011, 2012, 2013, 2014, 2016, 2017, 2018, 2019, 2021, 2022, 2025

Individual conference champions
- 1954, 1971, 1973, 1977, 1985, 1988, 1991, 1993, 1995, 1999, 2000, 2001, 2005 (2), 2006 (2), 2009, 2010 (2), 2011, 2012, 2013, 2014, 2017, 2018, 2021, 2022, 2025

The Kent State Golden Flashes men's golf team is an intercollegiate sport at Kent State University in Kent, Ohio, United States. The program was established in 1934 and competes in the National Collegiate Athletic Association at the Division I level as a member of the Mid-American Conference. Through the 2021–22 season, the Flashes have won 30 conference titles, which includes two championships won as a member of the Ohio Athletic Conference prior to 1951. The 29 MAC titles are the most men's golf titles in conference history and the most conference titles among any sport at Kent State. Through 2025, Kent State has produced 28 MAC medalists. In addition to their conference titles, Kent State has made 36 total appearances in the NCAA Division I Men's Golf Championships, winning three regional championships and advancing to the championship rounds 22 times. The program's highest national finishes are a tie for 5th in 2012, 6th in 2008, and 9th in 2000.

Windmill Lakes Golf Club in Ravenna serves as the program's home course and occasionally hosts matches. The main practice facility is the Page and Ferrara Golf Training and Learning Center, a 10,000-square-foot (930 m^{2}) building located in Franklin Township, which the team shares with the women's golf team. The facility includes a 350-yard (320 m) outdoor practice range, outdoor practice tees, and outdoor short-game practice areas as well as an indoor putting and chipping area, a video analysis room, and a Science and Motion Putt lab. In addition, the rear of the facility features heated stalls which allow team members to access the driving range year-round.

KSU alumnus Jon Mills serves as head coach, after succeeding Herb Page in 2019. Under Page, who coached Kent State for 41 seasons, the Flashes won 23 MAC titles and made 29 appearances in the NCAA tournament. He was named MAC Coach of the Year 21 times and NCAA District IV Coach of the Year nine times. Notable players from the program include 2003 British Open champion Ben Curtis, and Canadian professional golfers Corey Conners, Mackenzie Hughes, Bryan DeCorso, Taylor Pendrith, and Ryan Yip.

== History ==
The team was founded in late 1934 and initially competed only in the fall sports season. Kent State had joined the Ohio Athletic Conference in 1931, so the new golf team began play in the OAC their first season. They were first coached by Joe Begala, a physical education instructor who was also coaching the KSU football team, wrestling team, and men's tennis team that season. In their inaugural season, the Flashes went undefeated in dual match play to claim the school's first conference championship in any sport, going 6–0. The following season, Kent State went 1–5. Until 1936, the OAC used a dual meet format to determine its golf champion and did not have a conference championship meet at the end of the season. The Flashes made their first appearance in the NCAA Men's Golf Championships in 1947, finishing 38th. Kent State went undefeated in OAC dual meets again in 1949, but finished seventh at the OAC meet. However, they again qualified for the NCAA championships, where they finished 28th. Kent State claimed their first and only OAC meet championship in their final OAC tournament appearance in 1950, after finishing the regular season with an 8–1 record in dual matches. KSU was ineligible for the 1951 OAC tournament after the conference passed a resolution barring the Flashes from competing for the conference title. At the Ohio Intercollegiate Golf Championship held a week after the OAC championship, however, Kent State finished 23 and 24 strokes ahead of the OAC co-champions. They also qualified for the NCAA Championships that season, finishing 17th.

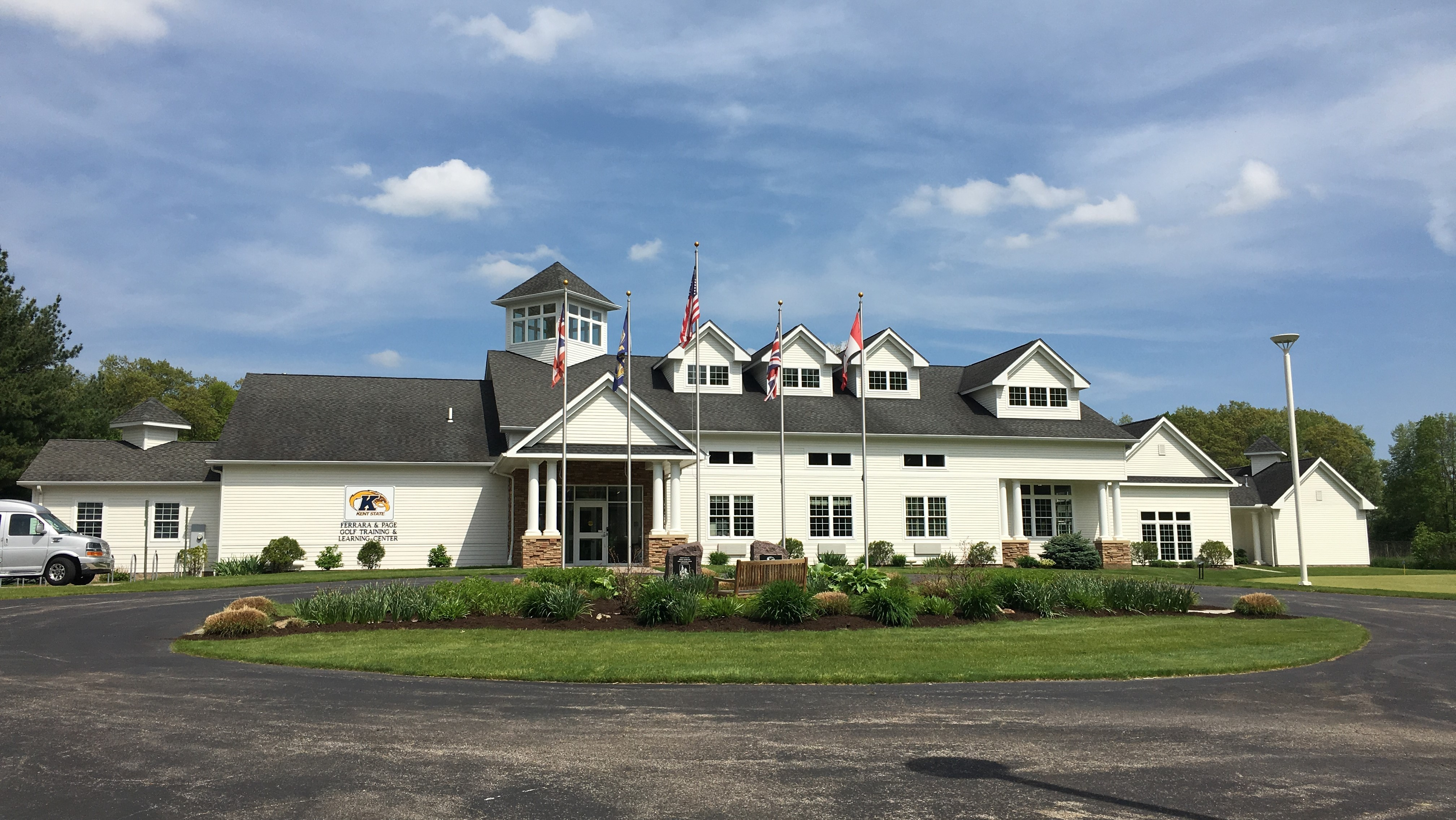
Kent State Golf clubhouse

The Flashes began competition in the Mid-American Conference in 1952 and hosted the championship meet at Meadowview Golf Course just east of campus in Franklin Township. The MAC Golf Championship was part of the MAC's "sports carnival", which included the tennis and track championships. KSU finished third in both their first and second MAC appearances. They claimed their first MAC team and individual titles in 1954 as co-champions with the Ohio Bobcats, and qualified for their fourth NCAA Men's Golf Championships appearance. After a tie for second at the MAC Championships in 1955, the Flashes finished no better than 4th until a 3rd place showing in 1967. The following season, they won their second overall and first outright conference title, again played at Meadowview.

Because of the Kent State shootings on May 4, 1970, the university was closed and all activities suspended. As such, the Flashes did not participate in that year's MAC championship meet. They returned in 1971 with a team runner-up finish and their second individual title, followed by another individual title in 1973. They claimed their third MAC title in 1977 and qualified for that season's NCAA championships, but were unable to attend.

Herb Page began his tenure as head coach in 1978 and has made Kent State a regular contender in both the Mid-American Conference and at the NCAA tournament. He led the Flashes to their fourth MAC championship in 1984 and their first appearance in the NCAA championship round since 1954, followed in 1987 with another NCAA championship round appearance. Beginning with their 1989 regional appearance, Kent State has qualified for the NCAA regionals in 25 of 29 seasons, including eight consecutive from 1989 through 1996 and seven consecutive from 2008 through 2014. They have advanced to the championship round in 14 of those years, winning regional championships in 1993, 2001, and 2010. In the championship round, Kent State has finished as high as a tie for 5th in 2012, 6th in 2008, and 9th in 2000. In the Mid-American Conference, since their fifth MAC title in 1992, the Flashes have won 21 additional MAC championships in 27 seasons, including four in a row from 1992 through 1995, five consecutive titles from 1997 through 2001, and six consecutive from 2009 through 2014. Additionally, under Page, Kent State has had 20 MAC medalists, 16 MAC Golfer of the Year recipients, and he has been named MAC Coach of the Year 20 times, all of which are the most in conference history.

== Conference championships ==
Kent State has won 29 Mid-American Conference Men's Golf Championships since joining the conference in 1951 and has had 28 individual MAC medalists, including co-champions in 2005, 2006, and 2010. Prior to joining the MAC, Kent State competed as a member of the Ohio Athletic Conference from 1934 to 1951, where they won two titles. The Flashes won their first conference title in any sport in 1934 in their first season of play and won the OAC again in 1950. They won their first MAC title in 1954 when they shared the championship with the Ohio Bobcats. After titles in 1968, 1977, and 1984, Kent State won four in a row beginning in 1992, followed by five consecutive MAC titles beginning in 1994, and six consecutive beginning in 2009. Kent State's 29 MAC championships are the most in conference history.

Mid-American Conference championship
Year	Location	Finish	Top individual (place)
1952	Meadowview Golf Course • Kent, Ohio	3rd	R. Johnston (5th)
1953	Kalamazoo, Michigan	3rd	
1954	Oxford Country Club • Oxford, Ohio	T-1st	Danny Forlani (T-1st)
1955	Athens Country Club • Athens, Ohio	T-2nd	Joe Lazor (4th)
1956	Bowling Green Country Club • Bowling Green, Ohio	4th	Fran Chionchio, Ed Zofko (T-10th)
1957	Meadowview Golf Course • Kent, Ohio	5th	Ed Zofko (T-8th)
1958	Kalamazoo, Michigan	6th	
1959	Oxford Country Club •Oxford, Ohio	6th	
1960	Athens Country Club • Athens, Ohio	5th	
1961	Bowling Green, Ohio	7th	
1962	Meadowview Golf Course • Kent, Ohio	6th	
1963	Kalamazoo, Michigan	6th	
1964	Oxford Country Club • Oxford, Ohio	7th	
1965	Athens Country Club • Athens, Ohio	7th	
1966	Toledo Country Club • Toledo, Ohio	7th	
1967	Bowling Green, Ohio	3rd	Rick Meeker (T-6th)
1968	Meadowview Golf Course • Kent, Ohio	1st	Larry Homer (T-6th)
1969	Kalamazoo, Michigan	3rd	Dale Krusoe (5th)
1970	Did not participate		
1971	Athens Country Club • Athens, Ohio	2nd	Dan Strimple (1st)
1972	Belmont Country Club • Toledo, Ohio	4th	Neal Detter (7th)
1973	Belmont Country Club • Toledo, Ohio; Bowling Green State University Golf Course • Bowling Green, Ohio	4th	Mike Morrow (1st)
1974	Bowling Green State University Golf Course • Bowling Green, Ohio; Meadowview Golf Course • Kent, Ohio	2nd	Mike Morrow (4th)
1975	Meadowview Golf Course • Kent, Ohio; Lake Dostral Country Club • Kalamazoo, Michigan	T-7th	Mike Morrow (2nd)
1976	Lake Dostral Country Club • Kalamazoo, Michigan; Hueston Woods • Oxford, Ohio	7th	Art Nash (7th)
1977	Hueston Woods • Oxford, Ohio; Athens Country Club • Athens, Ohio	1st	Ned Weaver (1st)
1978	Ohio University Country Club • Athens, Ohio; Central Michigan University Golf Course • Mount Pleasant, Michigan	5th	Doug Hanzel (T-8th)
1979	Ypsilanti, Michigan	8th	Doug Hanzel (2nd)
1980	DeKalb, Illinois	9th	
1981	Muncie, Indiana	9th	
1982	Toledo, Ohio	8th	
1983	Bowling Green, Ohio	4th	Karl Zoller (T-7th)
1984	Windmill Lakes Golf Club • Ravenna, Ohio	T-1st	Karl Zoller (4th)
1985	Kishwaukee Country Club • DeKalb, Illinois	2nd	Karl Zoller (1st)
1986	Moors Golf Club • Portage, Michigan	4th	Chuck Crawford (2nd)
1987	Hueston Woods Golf Course • Oxford, Ohio	3rd	Chuck Crawford (2nd)
1988	Athens Country Club • Athens, Ohio	2nd	Rob Moss (1st)
1989	Delaware Country Club • Muncie, Indiana	3rd	Rob Moss (2nd)
1990	Huron Golf Club • Ypsilanti, Michigan	2nd	Brian Bridges (2nd)
1991	Toledo Country Club • Toledo, Ohio	2nd	Dave Moreland (1st)
1992	Forrest Creason Golf Course • Bowling Green, Ohio	T-1st	Eric Frishette (T-3rd)
1993	Windmill Lakes • Ravenna, Ohio	1st	Eric Frishette (1st)
1994	Firestone Country Club • Akron, Ohio	1st	Donnie Darr, Bryan DeCorso (T-5th)
1995	Firestone Country Club • Akron, Ohio	1st	Bryan DeCorso (1st)
1996	Firestone Country Club • Akron, Ohio	2nd	Bill Curtis (T-3rd)
1997	Quail Hollow Country Club • Concord, Ohio	1st	Todd Lancaster (3rd)
1998	Quail Hollow Country Club • Concord, Ohio	1st	Danny Sahl (3rd)
1999	Medallion Club • Westerville, Ohio	1st	Danny Sahl (1st)
2000	Medallion Club • Westerville, Ohio	1st	Ben Curtis (1st)
2001	Medallion Club • Westerville, Ohio	1st	Jon Mills (1st)
2002	Medallion Club • Westerville, Ohio	2nd	Steve Lohmeyer (5th)
2003	Rich Harvest Farms • Sugar Grove, Illinois	1st	Peter Laws, Steve Lohmeyer (T-3rd)
2004	Medallion Club • Westerville, Ohio	3rd	Marc Bourgeois (T-6th)
2005	Medallion Club • Westerville, Ohio	1st	Ryan Yip, Tommy Wiegand (1st)
2006	Brickyard Crossing • Indianapolis	1st	Marc Bourgeois, Tommy Wiegand (1st)
2007	Medallion Club • Westerville, Ohio	3rd	Peter Ahn (3rd)
2008	Longaberger Golf Club • Nashport, Ohio	2nd	John Hahn (3rd)
2009	Brickyard Crossing • Indianapolis	1st	John Hahn (1st)
2010	Longaberger Golf Club • Nashport, Ohio	1st	Brett Cairns, John Hawn (1st)
2011	TPC River's Bend • Maineville, Ohio	1st	Mackenzie Hughes (1st)
2012	Rich Harvest Farms • Sugar Grove, Illinois	1st	Corey Conners (1st)
2013	Longaberger Golf Club • Nashport, Ohio	1st	Taylor Pendrith (1st)
2014	Prairie View Golf Club • Carmel, Indiana	1st	Corey Conners (1st)
2015	The Mayfield Sand Ridge Club • Chardon, Ohio	5th	Ian Holt (2nd)
2016	Highland Meadows Golf Club • Sylvania, Ohio	1st	Ian Holt (T-2nd)
2017	Virtues Golf Club • Nashport, Ohio	1st	Gisli Sveinbergsson (1st)
2018	Sycamore Hills Golf Club • Fort Wayne, Indiana	1st	Ian Holt (1st)
2019	Club Walden • Aurora, Ohio	T-1st	Gisli Sveinbergsson (2nd)
2020	Sycamore Hills Golf Club • Fort Wayne, Indiana	Cancelled due to the coronavirus pandemic	
2021	Sycamore Hills Golf Club • Fort Wayne, Indiana	1st	Chris Vandette (1st)
2022	White Eagle Golf Club • Naperville, Illinois	1st	Josh Gilkison (1st)
2023	Canebrake Golf Club • Athens, Alabama	4th	Cade Breitenstine (3rd)
2024	The Club at Chatham Hills • Westfield, Indiana	T-3rd	Bryce Reed (2nd)
2025	Pinnacle Golf Club • Grove City, Ohio	1st	Jordan Gilkison (1st)
2026	Holliday Farms • Zionsville, Indiana	4th	Liam Curtis (T-3rd)
Totals: 29 MAC Championships; 28 MAC medalists

== NCAA tournament ==
The NCAA Division I men's golf championship debuted in 1939 and the Flashes made their first appearance in 1947. Initially, the tournament consisted of only the championship rounds, with regional rounds added in 1989. Through the 2024–25 season, Kent State has 37 total appearances in the tournament with 22 appearances in the championship round. Since the start of regional play, Kent State has advanced to the championship round 15 times and won three regional titles through 2020. They have three top-ten finishes in the championship round: a tie for 5th in 2012, 6th in 2008, and 9th in 2000.

Year	Round	Location	Finish
1947	Championship	University of Michigan Golf Course • Ann Arbor, Michigan	38th
1949	Championship	Veenker Memorial Golf Course • Ames, Iowa	28th
1951	Championship	Ohio State University Golf Club • Upper Arlington, Ohio	17th
1954	Championship	Braeburn Country Club • Houston	18th
1968	Championship	NMSU Golf Course • Las Cruces, New Mexico	NA‡
1977	Championship	Seven Oaks Golf Course • Hamilton, New York	NA‡
1984	Championship	Bear Creek Golf World • Houston	24th
1987	Championship	Ohio State University Golf Club • Upper Arlington, Ohio	T-25th
1989	Regional	Stonebridge Ranch Country Club • McKinney, Texas	12th
1990	Regional	Ohio State University Golf Club • Upper Arlington, Ohio	4th
1990	Championship	Innisbrook Island Course • Tarpon Springs, Florida	T-18th
1991	Regional	Hillcrest Country Club • Boise, Idaho	12th
1992	Regional	Stonebridge Ranch Country Club • McKinney, Texas	7th
1992	Championship	Championship Golf Course • Albuquerque, New Mexico	26th
1993	Regional	•	1st
1993	Championship	Champions Golf Course • Lexington, Kentucky	27th
1994	Regional	Oklahoma City Golf Club • Oklahoma City	4th
1994	Championship	Stonebridge Country Club • McKinney, Texas	13th
1995	Regional	Bentwater Country Club • Montgomery, Texas	3rd
1995	Championship	Ohio State University Golf Club • Upper Arlington, Ohio	27th
1996	Regional	University of Michigan Golf Course • Ann Arbor, Michigan	14th
1998	Regional	Texas Oak Hill Country Club • San Antonio, Texas	10th
1998	Championship	Championship Golf Course • Albuquerque, New Mexico	24th
1999	Regional	Ohio State University Golf Club • Upper Arlington, Ohio	11th
2000	Regional	Victoria Country Club • Victoria, Texas	2nd
2000	Championship	Grand National • Opelika, Alabama	9th
2001	Regional	Karsten Creek Golf Club • Stillwater, Oklahoma	T-1st
2001	Championship	Duke Golf Club • Durham, North Carolina	30th
2003	Regional	Colbert Hills Golf Course • Manhattan, Kansas	17th
2004	Regional	Birck Boilermaker Golf Club • West Lafayette, Indiana	10th
2004	Championship	The Homestead • Hot Springs, Virginia	24th
2005	Regional	Warren Golf Course • South Bend, Indiana	T-17th
2006	Regional	Sand Ridge Golf Club • Chardon, Ohio	20th
2008	Regional	Ohio State University Golf CLub • Upper Arlington, Ohio	T-8th
2008	Championship	Birck Boilermaker Golf Club • West Lafayette, Indiana	6th
2009	Regional	Galloway National Golf Club • Galloway Township, New Jersey	8th
2010	Regional	The Course at Yale • New Haven, Connecticut	T-1st
2010	Championship	Honors Course • Chattanooga, Tennessee	20th
2011	Regional	Pete Dye River Course • Radford, Virginia	5th
2011	Championship	Karsten Creek Golf Club • Stillwater, Oklahoma	T-19th
2012	Regional	University of Michigan Golf Course • Ann Arbor, Michigan	3rd
2012	Championship	Riviera Country Club • Pacific Palisades, California	T-5th
2013	Regional	Blessings Golf Club • Fayetteville, Arkansas	5th
2013	Championship	Capital City Club • Alpharetta, Georgia	T-27th
2014	Regional	Rich Harvest Farms • Sugar Grove, Illinois	7th
2016	Regional	Meadow Valleys Course at Blackwolf Run • Kohler, Wisconsin	12th
2017	Regional	Aldarra Golf Club • Sammamish, Washington	2nd
2017	Championship	Rich Harvest Farms • Sugar Grove, Illinois	21st
2018	Regional	Watson Course • Reunion, Florida	5th
2018	Championship	Karsten Creek Golf Club • Stillwater, Oklahoma	10th
2019	Regional	Palouse Ridge Golf Club • Pullman, Washington	T-9th
2021	Regional	The Golf Club of Tennessee • Kingston Springs, Tennessee	10th
2022	Regional	Jimmie Austin OU Golf Club • Norman, Oklahoma	11th
2025	Regional	Poplar Grove Golf Course • Amherst, Virginia	10th
Totals: 36 total NCAA appearances; 22 championship round appearances

Regional titles shaded in ██ yellow. Championship round qualifying finishes shaded in ██ light yellow.
‡ = Qualified and invited as MAC champions; results not listed in NCAA records

== Coaches ==
Name	Years	Seasons	Events	Team titles	Conference titles	NCAA appearances
Joe Begala	1933–1935	2	0	0	1934^{†‡}	—
Cliff Thompson	1938–1942	4	1	0	0	—
Harry Adams	1946–1948	2	2	0	0	Championship: 1947
Charles Wipperman	1948–1949	1	2	1	0	Championship: 1949
Howard Morrette	1949–1960	11	21	2	1950^{†}, 1954	Championship: 1951
Jay Fischer	1960–1968	8	20	2	1968	Championship: 1968^{#}
Jim Brown	1968–1973	5	31	3	0	—
Frank Truitt	1973–1978	5	45	2	1977	Championship: 1977^{#}
Herb Page	1978–2019	41	515	90	1984, 1992, 1993, 1994, 1995, 1997, 1998, 1999, 2000, 2001, 2003, 2005, 2006, 2009, 2010, 2011, 2012, 2013, 2014, 2016, 2017, 2018, 2019	Regional: 1989, 1990, 1991, 1992, 1993, 1994, 1995, 1996, 1998, 1999, 2000, 2001, 2003, 2004, 2005, 2006, 2008, 2009, 2010, 2011, 2012, 2013, 2014, 2016, 2017, 2018, 2019; Championship: 1987, 1990, 1992, 1993, 1994, 1995, 1998, 2000, 2001, 2004, 2008, 2010, 2011, 2012, 2013, 2017, 2018
Jon Mills	2019–present	6	62	5	2021, 2022, 2025	Regional: 2021, 2022, 2025

† – Ohio Athletic Conference titles
‡ – regular season title, prior to creation of conference tournament
# – qualified, but did not attend

== Facilities ==
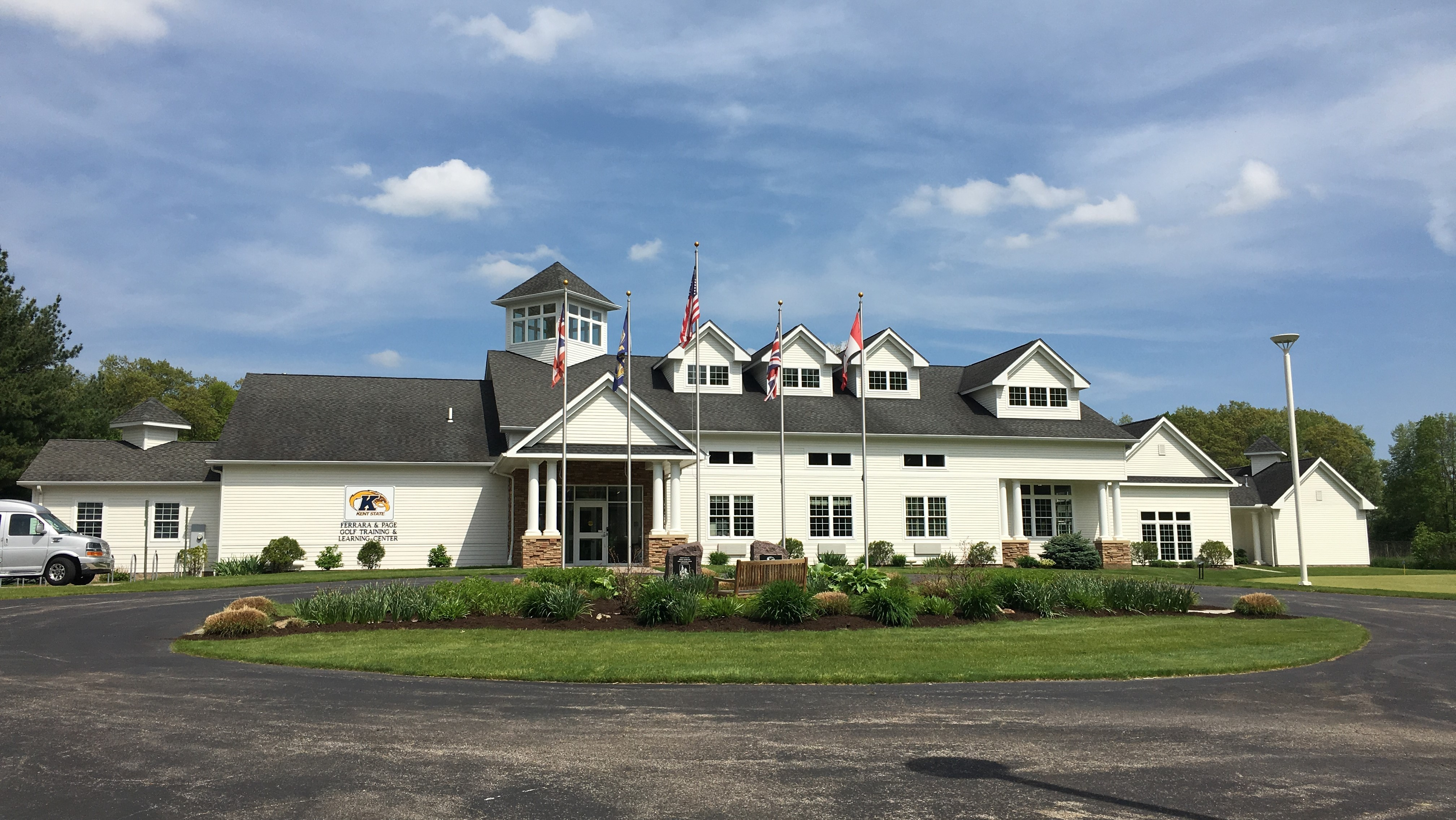
Ferra and Page Golf Training and Learning Center in Franklin Township

The team's home course is Windmill Lakes Golf Club, located approximately 6 miles (9.7 km) east of Kent in Ravenna, which has also been used by the women's golf team since their inception in 1999. Kent State began using the course regularly in 1978 after Herb Page, the head professional and part-owner at Windmill Lakes, was hired as head coach. Windmill Lakes is a par 70 course measuring 6,936 yards (6,342 m). It is mainly used for practices and occasional tournaments, hosting the Mid-American Conference Men's Golf Championships in 1984 and 1993. It was most recently used for a tournament in 2008 when KSU hosted the FirstEnergy Intercollegiate.

At their founding in 1934, the Flashes had two home courses, both of which were located just outside the city of Kent in Franklin Township: Twin Lakes Country Club in the Twin Lakes area just north of Kent, and Meadowview Golf Course, just east of campus. The university bought Meadowview in January 1966 and eventually renamed in the Kent State University Golf Course. Kent State hosted the Mid-American Conference Men's Golf Championships at Meadowview on five occasions between 1952 and 1975. After moving to Windmill Lakes, the Flashes continued using the Kent State University Golf Course for occasional practice until it was closed at the end of 2016.

The main training facility for both the men's and women's golf teams is the Ferrara and Page Golf Training and Learning Center, located in Franklin Township adjacent to the southern boundary of the former KSU Golf Course, less than one mile (1.6 km) north of Dix Stadium. The facility, named after head coach Herb Page and philanthropists Emilio and Margaret Ferrara, includes a 10,000 square feet (930 m^{2}) outdoor putting green, a 350-yard (320 m) practice range, along with practice fairways and tee areas, and heated bays that allow outdoor practice during winter months. Inside is a 3,000 square feet (280 m^{2}) practice green, team locker rooms, video room, offices, weight room, and a lounge and study area.

== Awards ==
The Mid-American Conference has four awards, which are selected at the conference championship: Sportsman of the Year, Golfer of the Year, Freshman of the Year, and Coach of the Year. Both the Golfer of the Year and Freshman of the Year awards started in 1994, while Coach of the Year began in 1973. The Sportsman of the Year award, started in 1981 is voted on by players.

MAC Golfer of the Year
Name	Year(s)
Eric Frischette	1994
Bryan DeCorso	1995
Ben Curtis	2000
Jon Mills	2001
Peter Laws	2005
Ryan Yip	2005
John Hahn	2008, 2009, 2011
Brett Cairns	2010
Corey Conners	2012, 2014
Taylor Pendrith	2013, 2014
Chase Johnson	2016
Ian Holt	2017, 2018
Cade Breitenstine	2021
Jordan Gilkison	2025

MAC Freshman of the Year
Name	Year(s)
Todd Lancaster	1995
Ben Curtis	1997
Jon Mills	1998
Steve Lohmeyer	2002
Ryan Yip	2003
Marc Bourgeois	2004
Tommy Wiegand	2005
John Hahn	2008
Mackenzie Hughes	2009
Kevin Miller	2010
Gisli Sveinbergsson	2016
Ben MacLean	2023
Isaiah Ibit	2025

MAC Sportsman of the Year
Name	Year(s)
Joe Lombradi	1987
Chuck Crawford	1988
Paul DeCorso	1989
Rob Moss	1990
Bryan DeCorso	1995
Donnie Darr	1996
Ben Curtis	2000
Jon Mills	2001
Marc Bourgeois	2007

MAC Coach of the Year
Name	Year(s)
Frank Truitt	1977
Herb Page	1983, 1984, 1990, 1992, 1993, 1994, 1995, 1998, 1999, 2000, 2001, 2005, 2006, 2009, 2010, 2012, 2013, 2014, 2016, 2017, 2018
Jon Mills	2021, 2025

== Notable alumni ==
- Corey Conners, 2010–2014, Canadian professional golfer on PGA Tour who won the 2019 and 2023 Valero Texas Open; played previously on PGA Tour Canada, PGA Tour Latinoamérica, and Web.com Tour
- Ben Curtis, 1996–2000, American professional golfer on the PGA Tour since 2000 and 2003 British Open champion
- Bryan DeCorso, 1991–1995, Canadian professional golfer on the PGA Tour since 1995
- John Hahn, 2008–2011, American professional golfer on the European Tour since 2011
- Mackenzie Hughes, 2008–2012, Canadian professional golfer on the PGA Tour, where he won the 2016 RSM Classic
- Jon Mills, 1998–2002, Canadian professional golfer on the PGA Tour since 2003
- David Morland IV, 1987–1991, Canadian professional golfer on the Canadian Tour, Nationwide Tour, and PGA Tour since 1991
- Taylor Pendrith, 2010–2014, Canadian professional golfer on the PGA Tour Canada and Korn Ferry Tour since 2014
- Ryan Yip, 2002–2006, Canadian professional golfer on the PGA Tour Canada since 2006
- Karl Zoller, 1981–1985, American professional golfer on the Nationwide Tour, beginning in 1986
