= Mid-American Conference Men's Golf Championships =

Mid-American Conference Men's golf championships
- Conference golf championship
- Sport: Men's golf
- Conference: Mid-American Conference
- Number of teams: 8
- Played: 1947–present
- Last contest: 2026
- Current champion: Miami (14)
- Most championships: Kent State (29)
- Official website: mac-sports.com/index.aspx?path=mgolf

The Mid-American Conference men's golf championships is the conference championship tournament for men's golf in the Mid-American Conference, a Division I member of the National Collegiate Athletic Association (NCAA). All eight conference members qualify for the championship meet, which is played in stroke play format and held in three rounds over a three-day period in late April or early May. The winning team receives a regional berth to the NCAA Division I Men's Golf Championships. The tournament began in 1947 and is rotated to different courses each year, with the various conference members acting as host. Through the 2022 championship, Kent State has won the most conference titles with 29, followed by Ohio with 18.

== History and format ==
The championship was organized in 1947, the first season of play for the conference after it had formed in late 1946. The initial championship, held in Detroit and won by the Wayne Tartans, had the original four conference members. For many years, the men's golf championship, along with the men's track and field championship and tennis championship, were rotated together amongst conference members as part of a two-day MAC "sports carnival" in late May. Beginning in 1973, the championship was held at two sites, with the opening rounds in one location and the concluding rounds at another. The location of the final rounds in one year would serve as the host for the opening rounds the following year. This format continued through 1978 and then returned to a single-site host in 1979.

The number of participating schools stood at nine in 2006 and was as high as 10 between 1977 and 1985 and again from 1998 through 2005. It was reduced to eight following the announcement in May 2020 that Akron was eliminating its men's golf team. Although the championship is no longer held in conjunction with the tennis and track and field championships, until 1993, the conference rotated the tournament to the home courses of each conference member. Since the 1994 championship, held at the Firestone Country Club in Akron, Ohio, the championship has rotated to neutral-site courses in Ohio, Indiana, and Illinois. After three years at Firestone, the tournament was held for two years at Quail Hollow Country Club in Concord, Ohio, and then began a four-year run at The Medallion Club in Westerville, Ohio from 1999 through 2002. After the 2003 championship was held at Rich Harvest Farms in Sugar Grove, Illinois, the tournament returned to The Medallion Club for two more years in 2004 and 2005. Since 2006, the tournament has been held at a different course each year in Ohio, Illinois, and Indiana. The Medallion Club hosted again in 2007 and Rich Harvest Farms in 2012, while courses such as Virtues Golf Club in Nashport, Ohio, and Brickyard Crossing in Indianapolis have also hosted multiple times. Virtues Golf Club, previously known as Longaberger Golf Club, hosted for the fourth time in 2017, followed by Sycamore Hills Golf Club in Fort Wayne, Indiana, in 2018, and Club Walden in Aurora, Ohio, in 2019.

The tournament has always used stroke play as its competition format, and was initially a two-round tournament through 1967, with a third round added in 1968. Since 1973 the tournament has been played over four rounds with few exceptions. The last tournament to include only three rounds was the 2012 championship, after the final round was canceled due to rain. The 2019 tournament was only two rounds after rain forced cancellation of the final two rounds. An individual conference champion is also determined by the tournament. If two or more golfers finish tied for medalist honors, they are all awarded. The exception for this was the 1980 and 1982 MAC Medalists where a playoff was held to break the tie. At the conclusion of the tournament, the MAC season awards are given out, including Coach of the Year, Golfer of the Year, Freshman of the Year, and the naming of All-MAC teams.

=== By year ===
| Year | Venue | Location | Team champion | Medalist (school) |
|---|---|---|---|---|
| 1947 | | Detroit, Michigan | Wayne | Clyde McEntyre (Butler); Gordon Verville (Wayne) |
| 1948 | Athens Country Club | Athens, Ohio | Miami | Bob Ludlow (Butler) |
| 1949 | | Kalamazoo, Michigan | Western Michigan | Clyde McEntyre (Butler) |
| 1950 | Oxford Country Club | Oxford, Ohio | Miami | Clyde McEntyre (Butler) |
| 1951 | Athens Country Club | Athens, Ohio | Ohio | Dave Rambo (Ohio) |
| 1952 | Meadowview Golf Course | Kent, Ohio | Ohio | Roger Pedigo (Ohio) |
| 1953 | | Kalamazoo, Michigan | Ohio | Don Kelly (Western Michigan) |
| 1954 | Oxford Country Club | Oxford, Ohio | Kent State; Ohio | Danny Forlani (Kent State); Dick Smail (Ohio) |
| 1955 | Athens Country Club | Athens, Ohio | Ohio | Dave Moore (Ohio); Dick Smail (Ohio) |
| 1956 | Bowling Green Country Club | Bowling Green, Ohio | Bowling Green | Ray Bovee (Western Michigan) |
| 1957 | Meadowview Golf Course | Kent, Ohio | Ohio | Jack Freeman (Marshall) |
| 1958 | | Kalamazoo, Michigan | Ohio | Linden Meade (Marshall) |
| 1959 | Oxford Country Club | Oxford, Ohio | Ohio | Charles Vandlik (Ohio) |
| 1960 | Athens Country Club | Athens, Ohio | Ohio | Bill Santor (Ohio) |
| 1961 | | Bowling Green, Ohio | Ohio | Pete Byer (Marshall) |
| 1962 | Meadowview Golf Course | Kent, Ohio | Marshall | Jim Ward (Marshall); Pete Byer (Marshall) |
| 1963 | | Kalamazoo, Michigan | Ohio | Nick Karl (Ohio) |
| 1964 | Oxford Country Club | Oxford, Ohio | Ohio | Stu Hughes (Bowling Green) |
| 1965 | Athens Country Club | Athens, Ohio | Ohio | Dick Shepard (Marshall) |
| 1966 | Toledo Country Club | Toledo, Ohio | Marshall | Jon Feaganes (Marshall) |
| 1967 | | Bowling Green, Ohio | Ohio | Tome Bohardt (Bowling Green); Terry Beard (Ohio) |
| 1968 | Meadowview Golf Course | Kent, Ohio | Kent State | Herm Kaiser (Marshall) |
| 1969 | | Kalamazoo, Michigan | Ohio | Chris Roderick (Miami) |
| 1970 | Hueston Woods | Oxford, Ohio | Miami | Chris Roberick (Miami); Bill Schumaker (Miami) |
| 1971 | Athens Country Club | Athens, Ohio | Ohio | Dan Strimple (Kent State) |
| 1972 | Belmont Country Club | Toledo, Ohio | Bowling Green | Steve Blowers (Bowling Green) |
| 1973 | Belmont Country Club; Bowling Green State University Golf Course | Toledo, Ohio; Bowling Green, Ohio | Bowling Green | Mike Morrow (Kent State) |
| 1974 | Bowling Green State University Golf Course; Meadowview Golf Course | Bowling Green, Ohio; Kent, Ohio | Miami | Kent Walters (Bowling Green) |
| 1975 | Meadowview Golf Course; Lake Dostral Country Club | Kent, Ohio; Kalamazoo, Michigan | Ball State | Mike Soli (Northern Illinois) |
| 1976 | Lake Dostral Country Club; Hueston Woods | Kalamazoo, Michigan; Oxford, Ohio | Northern Illinois | Mike Soli (Northern Illinois) |
| 1977 | Hueston Woods; Athens Country Club | Oxford, Ohio; Athens, Ohio | Kent State | Ned Weaver (Kent State) |
| 1978 | Ohio University Country Club; Central Michigan University Golf Course | Athens, Ohio; Mount Pleasant, Michigan | Bowling Green | Greg Dick (Northern Illinois) |
| 1979 | | Ypsilanti, Michigan | Ohio | Tim Hirt (Toledo) |
| 1980 | | DeKalb, Illinois | Ohio | Tim Hirt (Toledo) |
| 1981 | | Muncie, Indiana | Miami | Tim Hirt (Toledo) |
| 1982 | | Toledo, Ohio | Ball State | Mark Chapleski (Miami) |
| 1983 | | Bowling Green, Ohio | Bowling Green | Kirk Schooley (Ball State) |
| 1984 | Windmill Lakes Golf Club | Ravenna, Ohio | Kent State | Jim Muething (Miami) |
| 1985 | Kishwaukee Country Club | DeKalb, Illinois | Northern Illinois | Karl Zoller (Kent State) |
| 1986 | Moors Golf Club | Portage, Michigan | Ball State | Mark Brewer (Miami) |
| 1987 | Hueston Woods Golf Course | Oxford, Ohio | Miami | Mark Brewer (Miami) |
| 1988 | Athens Country Club | Athens, Ohio | Miami | Rob Moss (Kent State) |
| 1989 | Delaware Country Club | Muncie, Indiana | Miami | Sean Gorgone (Miami) |
| 1990 | Huron Golf Club | Ypsilanti, Michigan | Miami | Sean Gorgone (Miami) |
| 1991 | Toledo Country Club | Toledo, Ohio | Miami | Dave Moreland (Kent State) |
| 1992 | Forrest Creason Golf Course | Bowling Green, Ohio | Kent State; Miami | Mike Stone (Toledo) |
| 1993 | Windmill Lakes | Ravenna, Ohio | Kent State | Eric Frishette (Kent State) |
| 1994 | Firestone Country Club | Akron, Ohio | Kent State | Maarten van den Berg (Miami) |
| 1995 | Firestone Country Club | Akron, Ohio | Kent State | Bryan DeCorso (Kent State) |
| 1996 | Firestone Country Club | Akron, Ohio | Miami | Maarten van den Berg (Miami) |
| 1997 | Quail Hollow Country Club | Concord, Ohio | Kent State | Jamie Broce (Ball State); Tim Rice (Toledo) |
| 1998 | Quail Hollow Country Club | Concord, Ohio | Kent State | Kyle Voska (Miami) |
| 1999 | Medallion Club | Westerville, Ohio | Kent State | Danny Sahl (Kent State) |
| 2000 | Medallion Club | Westerville, Ohio | Kent State | Ben Curtis (Kent State) |
| 2001 | Medallion Club | Westerville, Ohio | Kent State | Jon Mills (Kent State) |
| 2002 | Medallion Club | Westerville, Ohio | Toledo | Eric Phipps (Miami) |
| 2003 | Rich Harvest Farms | Sugar Grove, Illinois | Kent State | Mark Weghorst (Miami) |
| 2004 | Medallion Club | Westerville, Ohio | Toledo | Brad Heaven (Toledo) |
| 2005 | Medallion Club | Westerville, Ohio | Kent State | Ryan Yip (Kent State); Tommy Wiegand (Kent State) |
| 2006 | Brickyard Crossing | Indianapolis, Indiana | Kent State | Marc Bourgeois (Kent State); Tommy Wiegand (Kent State) |
| 2007 | Medallion Club | Westerville, Ohio | Eastern Michigan | Graham Hill (Eastern Michigan) |
| 2008 | Longaberger Golf Club | Nashport, Ohio | Eastern Michigan | Ciaran McAleavey (Toledo) |
| 2009 | Brickyard Crossing | Indianapolis, Indiana | Kent State | John Hahn (Kent State) |
| 2010 | Longaberger Golf Club | Nashport, Ohio | Kent State | Brett Cairns (Kent State); John Hawn (Kent State) |
| 2011 | TPC River's Bend | Maineville, Ohio | Kent State | Mackenzie Hughes (Kent State) |
| 2012 | Rich Harvest Farms | Sugar Grove, Illinois | Kent State | Corey Conners (Kent State) |
| 2013 | Longaberger Golf Club | Nashport, Ohio | Kent State | Taylor Pendrith (Kent State) |
| 2014 | Prairie View Golf Club | Carmel, Indiana | Kent State | Corey Conners (Kent State) |
| 2015 | The Mayfield Sand Ridge Club | Chardon, Ohio | Miami | Johnny Watts (Ball State) |
| 2016 | Highland Meadows Golf Club | Sylvania, Ohio | Kent State | George Baylis (Akron) |
| 2017 | Virtues Golf Club | Nashport, Ohio | Kent State | Gisli Sveinbergsson (Kent State) |
| 2018 | Sycamore Hills Golf Club | Fort Wayne, Indiana | Kent State | Ian Holt (Kent State) |
| 2019 | Club Walden | Aurora, Ohio | Eastern Michigan; Kent State | Duncan McNeill (Toledo) |
| 2020 | Sycamore Hills Golf Club | Fort Wayne, Indiana | Cancelled due to the coronavirus pandemic | |
| 2021 | Sycamore Hills Golf Club | Fort Wayne, Indiana | Kent State | Chris Vandette (Kent State) |
| 2022 | White Eagle Golf Club | Naperville, Illinois | Kent State | Josh Gilkison (Kent State) |
| 2023 | Canebrake Golf Club | Athens, Alabama | Northern Illinois | Barend Botha (Toledo) |
| 2024 | The Club at Chatham Hills | Westfield, Indiana | Ball State | Barend Botha (Toledo) |
| 2025 | Pinnacle Golf Club | Grove City, Ohio | Kent State | Jordan Gilkison (Kent State) |
| 2026 | Holliday Farms | Zionsville, Indiana | Miami | Liam Nelson (Miami) |

=== By school ===
Of the 13 full-time members of the MAC, eight schools compete in men's golf as of 2020. Central Michigan dropped men's golf after the 1985 season followed by Western Michigan in 1988 and Akron in 2020. Northern Illinois was the most recent addition to the championship, beginning play in 1998 after having previously competed in the MAC from 1975 through 1986.

| Program | Tenure | Titles | Years won |
|---|---|---|---|
| Kent State | 1952–present | 29 | 1954^{†}, 1968, 1977, 1984, 1992^{†}, 1993, 1994, 1995, 1997, 1998, 1999, 2000, 2001, 2003, 2005, 2006, 2009, 2010, 2011, 2012, 2013, 2014, 2016, 2017, 2018, 2019^{†}, 2021, 2022, 2025 |
| Ohio | 1947–present | 18 | 1951, 1952, 1953, 1954^{†}, 1955, 1957, 1958, 1959, 1960, 1961, 1963, 1964, 1965, 1967, 1969, 1971, 1979, 1980 |
| Miami | 1948–present | 14 | 1948, 1950, 1970, 1974, 1981, 1987, 1988, 1989, 1990, 1991, 1992^{†}, 1996, 2015, 2026 |
| Bowling Green | 1953–present | 5 | 1956, 1972, 1973, 1978, 1983 |
| Ball State | 1975–present | 4 | 1975, 1982, 1986, 2024 |
| Eastern Michigan | 1973–present | 3 | 2007, 2008, 2019^{†} |
| Northern Illinois | 1975–1986; 1998–present | 3 | 1976, 1985, 2023 |
| Toledo | 1951–present | 2 | 2002, 2004 |
| Marshall | 1953–1969; 1998–2005 | 2 | 1962, 1966 |
| Western Michigan | 1948–1988 | 1 | 1949 |
| Wayne | 1947 | 1 | 1947 |
| Akron | 1993–2020 | 0 | |
| Butler | 1947–1950 | 0 | |
| Central Michigan | 1973–1985 | 0 | |
| Cincinnati | 1948–1952 | 0 | |
| Western Reserve | 1947–1955 | 0 | |

Former conference members shaded in ██ silver
^{†} – shared title
