= John Hahn =

John Hahn may refer to:

- John Hahn (politician), member of the U.S. House of Representatives from Pennsylvania
- John Hahn (golfer), American golfer
- John David Hahn, German educator
