= 2022 Masters Tournament =

American golf tournament

- Front cover of the 2022 Masters Journal

Tournament information
- Dates: April 7–10, 2022
- Location: Augusta, Georgia, U.S. 33.503°N 82.020°W
- Course: Augusta National Golf Club
- Tours: PGA Tour; European Tour; Japan Golf Tour

Statistics
- Par: 72
- Length: 7,510 yards (6,867 m)
- Field: 90 players, 52 after cut
- Cut: 148 (+4)
- Prize fund: $15,000,000
- Winner's share: $2,700,000

Champion
- (United States) Scottie Scheffler
- 278 (−10)
- Location in the United States Location in Georgia

The 2022 Masters Tournament was the 86th edition of the Masters Tournament, the first of the four major golf championships of 2022, held April 7–10 at Augusta National Golf Club in Augusta, Georgia.

For the first time since the 2019 tournament, attendance returned to full capacity with maximum of 40,000 spectators per day; the traditional par-3 contest also returned.

Scottie Scheffler won his first major by three strokes over Rory McIlroy. Scheffler had achieved his first PGA Tour win at the WM Phoenix Open two months earlier, and after also winning the Arnold Palmer Invitational and WGC-Dell Technologies Match Play he entered the Masters as world number one.

Scheffler led by a record-tying five strokes after the second round, and held the lead from then on. His main challenger was Cameron Smith, who narrowed the lead to one stroke after the second hole of the final round. On the subsequent hole, Scheffler and Smith found themselves in the same tricky position, with Scheffler chipping in for a birdie, and Smith only managing a bogey, extending the lead to 3 strokes. Smith made a triple bogey on the 12th hole after his ball went into the water, leaving Scheffler relatively unchallenged for the rest of the round.

Entering the final round 10 strokes back from Scheffler, Rory McIlroy shot a 8-under-par 64 to finish second, his best major finish since 2014. Much attention was given to Tiger Woods, who made his first PGA Tour start since the 2020 Masters after suffering severe injuries to his right leg and ankle in a February 2021 car accident. Woods made the cut and finished the tournament 47th, visibly limping for much of the last two rounds. Defending champion Hideki Matsuyama finished tied for 14th.

There was no winner of the Silver Cup (prize for low amateur), as no amateur made the cut. This year's purse was increased over thirty percent to $15 million, with a winner's share of $2.7 million.

== Course ==
Hole	Name	Yards	Par	Hole	Name	Yards	Par
1	Tea Olive	445	4	10	Camellia	495	4
2	Pink Dogwood	575	5	11	White Dogwood	520	4
3	Flowering Peach	350	4	12	Golden Bell	155	3
4	Flowering Crab Apple	240	3	13	Azalea	510	5
5	Magnolia	495	4	14	Chinese Fir	440	4
6	Juniper	180	3	15	Firethorn	550	5
7	Pampas	450	4	16	Redbud	170	3
8	Yellow Jasmine	570	5	17	Nandina	440	4
9	Carolina Cherry	460	4	18	Holly	465	4
Out		3,765	36	In		3,745	36
Source:				Total		7,510	72

- Holes 11 and 15 were lengthened by 15 and 20 yards, respectively, for this edition.

== Field ==
Participation in the Masters Tournament is by invitation only, and the tournament has the smallest field of the major championships. There are a number of criteria by which invites were awarded, including all past winners, recent major champions, leading finishers in the previous years' majors, leading players on the PGA Tour in the previous season, winners of full-point tournaments on the PGA Tour during the previous 12 months, leading players in the Official World Golf Ranking and some leading amateurs.

=== Criteria ===
This list details the qualification criteria for the 2022 Masters Tournament and the players who qualified under them; any additional criteria under which players qualified is indicated in parentheses.

1. All past winners of the Masters Tournament

- Fred Couples
- Sergio García (17,18,19)
- Dustin Johnson (17,18,19)
- Zach Johnson
- Bernhard Langer
- Sandy Lyle
- Hideki Matsuyama (12,16,17,18,19)
- Larry Mize
- José María Olazábal
- Patrick Reed (12,17,18,19)
- Charl Schwartzel
- Adam Scott (18,19)
- Vijay Singh
- Jordan Spieth (3,12,14,17,18,19)
- Bubba Watson
- Mike Weir
- Danny Willett
- Tiger Woods
- Past winners not playing: Tommy Aaron, Jack Burke Jr., Ángel Cabrera, Charles Coody, Ben Crenshaw, Nick Faldo, Raymond Floyd, Trevor Immelman, Phil Mickelson (4,15,16,18,19), Jack Nicklaus, Mark O'Meara, Gary Player, Craig Stadler, Tom Watson, Ian Woosnam, Fuzzy Zoeller

2. Recent winners of the U.S. Open (2017–2021)

- Bryson DeChambeau (17,18,19)
- Brooks Koepka (4,13,15,17,18,19)
- Jon Rahm (12,13,14,16,17,18,19)
- Gary Woodland

3. Recent winners of The Open Championship (2017–2021)

- Shane Lowry (15,18,19)
- Francesco Molinari
- Collin Morikawa (4,13,14,16,17,18,19)

4. Recent winners of the PGA Championship (2017–2021)

- Justin Thomas (5,12,17,18,19)

5. Recent winners of The Players Championship (2020–2022)

- Cameron Smith (12,16,17,18,19)

6. The winner of the gold medal at the Olympic Games

- Xander Schauffele (12,17,18,19)

7. The winner and runner-up in the 2021 U.S. Amateur

- Austin Greaser (a)
- James Piot (a)

8. The winner of the 2021 Amateur Championship

- Laird Shepherd (a)

9. The winner of the 2021 Asia-Pacific Amateur Championship

- Keita Nakajima (a)

10. The winner of the 2022 Latin America Amateur Championship

- Aaron Jarvis (a)

11. The winner of the 2021 U.S. Mid-Amateur Golf Championship

- Stewart Hagestad (a)

12. The leading 12 players, and those tying for 12th place, from the 2021 Masters Tournament

- Stewart Cink (16,17)
- Corey Conners (17,18,19)
- Tony Finau (16,17,18,19)
- Brian Harman
- Kim Si-woo
- Marc Leishman (18,19)
- Robert MacIntyre
- Kevin Na (17,18,19)
- Justin Rose (18)
- Webb Simpson (18,19)
- Will Zalatoris (18,19)

13. The leading four players, and those tying for fourth place, in the 2021 U.S. Open

- Guido Migliozzi
- Louis Oosthuizen (14,15,17,18,19)
- Harris English (16,17,18,19) did not play due to an injury.

14. The leading four players, and those tying for fourth place, in the 2021 Open Championship

15. The leading four players, and those tying for fourth place, in the 2021 PGA Championship

- Pádraig Harrington
- Harry Higgs
- Paul Casey (18,19) did not play due to an injury.

16. Winners of PGA Tour events (Note: Events must carry full-point allocation towards the FedEx Cup.) between the 2021 Masters Tournament and the 2022 Masters Tournament

- Abraham Ancer (17,18,19)
- Sam Burns (17,18,19)
- Patrick Cantlay (17,18,19)
- Cameron Champ
- Cameron Davis
- Lucas Glover
- Talor Gooch (18,19)
- Lucas Herbert (18,19)
- Garrick Higgo
- Tom Hoge (19)
- Max Homa (18,19)
- Viktor Hovland (17,18,19)
- Im Sung-jae (17,18,19)
- Kevin Kisner (18,19)
- Jason Kokrak (17,18,19)
- Lee Kyoung-hoon
- Luke List
- Rory McIlroy (17,18,19)
- Joaquín Niemann (17,18,19)
- Scottie Scheffler (17,18,19)
- J. J. Spaun
- Sepp Straka
- Hudson Swafford

17. All players who qualified for the 2021 Tour Championship

- Daniel Berger (18,19)
- Billy Horschel (18,19)
- Erik van Rooyen

18. The leading 50 players on the Official World Golf Ranking as of December 31, 2021

- Christiaan Bezuidenhout
- Matt Fitzpatrick (19)
- Tommy Fleetwood (19)
- Tyrrell Hatton (19)
- Mackenzie Hughes
- Takumi Kanaya (19)
- Min Woo Lee
- Ryan Palmer
- Lee Westwood
- Matthew Wolff (19)

19. The leading 50 players on the Official World Golf Ranking as of March 28, 2022

- Russell Henley
- Thomas Pieters
- Séamus Power
- Harold Varner III
- Cameron Young

20. Invited international players

- None

== Par 3 contest ==
Wednesday, April 6, 2022

The Par-3 contest was held for the first time since 2019. Play was halted at 3:44 pm ET with 26 players still on the course. Mike Weir and Mackenzie Hughes, co-leaders at four-under, were declared co-champions. Jason Kokrak recorded the only hole-in-one on the fourth hole.

== Weather ==
Thursday: Mostly sunny with morning thunderstorms. High of 74 °F (23 °C). Wind W 10–15 mph (16–24 km/h), with gusts to 25 mph (40 km/h). Due to thunderstorms, all starting times were delayed 30 minutes.

Friday: Mostly sunny. High of 66 °F (19 °C). Wind WSW 15–20 mph (24–32 km/h), with gusts to 30 mph (48 km/h).

Saturday: Cloudy. High of 56 °F (13 °C). Wind W 12–16 mph (19–26 km/h), with gusts to 25 mph (40 km/h).

Sunday: Sunny. High of 73 °F (23 °C). Wind W 6–12 mph (9.7–19.3 km/h).

== Round summaries ==
=== First round ===
Thursday, April 7, 2022

Im Sung-jae became the first Korean player to hold the lead after a round at the Masters following a five-under-par 67. Im birdied his first three holes and was four-under after seven holes before consecutive bogeys on holes 10 and 11. At the par-5 13th, Im hit his approach shot to 12 feet and made the putt for eagle before also birdieing the par-5 15th to take sole possession of the lead.

Cameron Smith, who finished tied for second with Im in 2020, opened with a double-bogey at the first hole. Beginning with a chip-in for birdie at the fifth, however, Smith went eight-under-par over a span of 14 holes. At the par-3 16th, Smith hit his tee shot to five feet and made the putt to get to six-under for the round before another double-bogey on the 18th dropped him back to four-under and a round of 68.

Scottie Scheffler, playing his first tournament as World No. 1, did not make a bogey until the 18th hole in a 3-under-par round of 69. He was in a group tied for third place that also included past champions Dustin Johnson and Danny Willett, as well as Joaquín Niemann, who holed out for an eagle on the par-4 ninth hole.

Harold Varner III, in his Masters debut, went four-under-par in a 4-hole stretch from the 13th to the 16th hole, including a near albatross from the pine straw at the 13th. He finished with a one-under-par 71.

Tiger Woods was playing in his first tournament since the 2020 Masters and opened with a one-under-par 71, tied for 10th place after 18 holes. Defending champion Hideki Matsuyama shot an even-par 72.

Overnight rain meant that the start was delayed by 30 minutes, with the first players teeing off at 8:30 a.m. local time.

Place	Player	Score	To par
1	(South Korea) Im Sung-jae	67	−5
2	(Australia) Cameron Smith	68	−4
T3	(United States) Dustin Johnson	69	−3
T3	(Chile) Joaquín Niemann	69	−3
T3	(United States) Scottie Scheffler	69	−3
T3	(England) Danny Willett	69	−3
T7	(United States) Patrick Cantlay	70	−2
T7	(Canada) Corey Conners	70	−2
T7	(United States) Jason Kokrak	70	−2
T10	(United States) Daniel Berger	71	−1
T10	(United States) Tony Finau	71	−1
T10	(England) Matt Fitzpatrick	71	−1
T10	(United States) Harry Higgs	71	−1
T10	(United States) Kevin Na	71	−1
T10	(United States) Webb Simpson	71	−1
T10	(United States) Harold Varner III	71	−1
T10	(United States) Tiger Woods	71	−1
T10	(United States) Will Zalatoris	71	−1

=== Second round ===
Friday, April 8, 2022

World No. 1 Scottie Scheffler added a five-under-par round of 67 to his first round 69, for an aggregate score of 136, 8-under-par. Four players, including first-round leader Im Sung-jae and defending champion Hideki Matsuyama, were in second place. Scheffler's five-stroke lead tied the 36-hole tournament record, with 4 of the 5 previous record holders going on to win.

Tiger Woods shot a 74, and had an aggregate score of 145, one-over-par, tying him for 19th place nine strokes behind the leader. Stewart Cink made a hole-in-one at the par-3 16th hole.

52 players made the cut of 148, 4-over-par. None of the six amateurs made the cut. Other notable players to miss the cut include 2015 Masters champion Jordan Spieth, 2019 Masters runner-ups Brooks Koepka and Xander Schauffele, and 2020 U.S. Open champion Bryson DeChambeau.

Place	Player	Score	To par
1	(United States) Scottie Scheffler	69-67=136	−8
T2	(South Korea) Im Sung-jae	67-74=141	−3
T2	(Republic of Ireland) Shane Lowry	73-68=141	−3
T2	(Japan) Hideki Matsuyama	72-69=141	−3
T2	(South Africa) Charl Schwartzel	72-69=141	−3
T6	(United States) Dustin Johnson	69-73=142	−2
T6	(United States) Kevin Na	71-71=142	−2
T6	(Australia) Cameron Smith	68-74=142	−2
T6	(United States) Harold Varner III	71-71=142	−2
T10	(Canada) Corey Conners	70-73=143	−1
T10	(United States) Collin Morikawa	73-70=143	−1
T10	(Chile) Joaquín Niemann	69-74=143	−1
T10	(United States) Justin Thomas	76-67=143	−1
T10	(England) Danny Willett	69-74=143	−1
T10	(United States) Will Zalatoris	71-72=143	−1

=== Third round ===
Saturday, April 9, 2022

Scottie Scheffler, beginning the round with a five-shot lead, made four birdies on the front-nine to get to 11-under and open a six-shot advantage at the turn. On the par-3 12th hole, Scheffler hit his tee shot into the bunker in front of the green and had his second roll over the green, leading to a bogey. After an up-and-down for birdie on the par-5 13th, his approach on the 14th spun off the green and led to another bogey. He found the green on the par-5 15th hole in three shots but three-putted for his third bogey over his last four holes.

With his lead now cut to just three shots, Scheffler played his approach on the 17th to five feet and made the birdie to get back to 10-under. At the 18th, he was forced to take a drop from underneath a tree after a drive well to the left, but was able to hit his third shot from the pine straw over the green and salvage a bogey to finish at nine-under following a round of 71.

Cameron Smith began the round six shots behind but went five-under from the sixth to 15th holes. Despite a bogey at the par-3 16th after failing to get up-and-down from a greenside bunker, Smith shot a four-under 68, the best round of the day by two shots, to finish at six-under, three behind Scheffler.

First-round leader Im Sung-jae double-bogeyed his first hole and was four-over through six holes, but played the remainder of his round in five-under to finish with a 71 and jump up to solo third place at four-under. 2011 champion Charl Schwartzel, playing in the final group with Scheffler, holed out from the fairway on the 10th for an eagle to get within three of the lead but made four bogeys over his final eight holes to drop back to two-under, tied for fourth with Shane Lowry.

Five-time champion Tiger Woods had four three-putts and a four-putt, his first in this tournament since 2005, in a six-over round of 78, the worst score of his career at the Masters.

Place	Player	Score	To par
1	(United States) Scottie Scheffler	69-67-71=207	−9
2	(Australia) Cameron Smith	68-74-68=210	−6
3	(South Korea) Im Sung-jae	67-74-71=212	−4
T4	(Republic of Ireland) Shane Lowry	73-68-73=214	−2
T4	(South Africa) Charl Schwartzel	72-69-73=214	−2
T6	(Canada) Corey Conners	70-73-72=215	−1
T6	(United States) Justin Thomas	76-67-72=215	−1
8	(England) Danny Willett	69-74-73=216	E
T9	(England) Tommy Fleetwood	75-72-70=217	+1
T9	(United States) Dustin Johnson	69-73-75=217	+1
T9	(United States) Jason Kokrak	70-76-71=217	+1
T9	(Northern Ireland) Rory McIlroy	73-73-71=217	+1
T9	(United States) Collin Morikawa	73-70-74=217	+1

=== Final round ===
Sunday, April 10, 2022

==== Summary ====
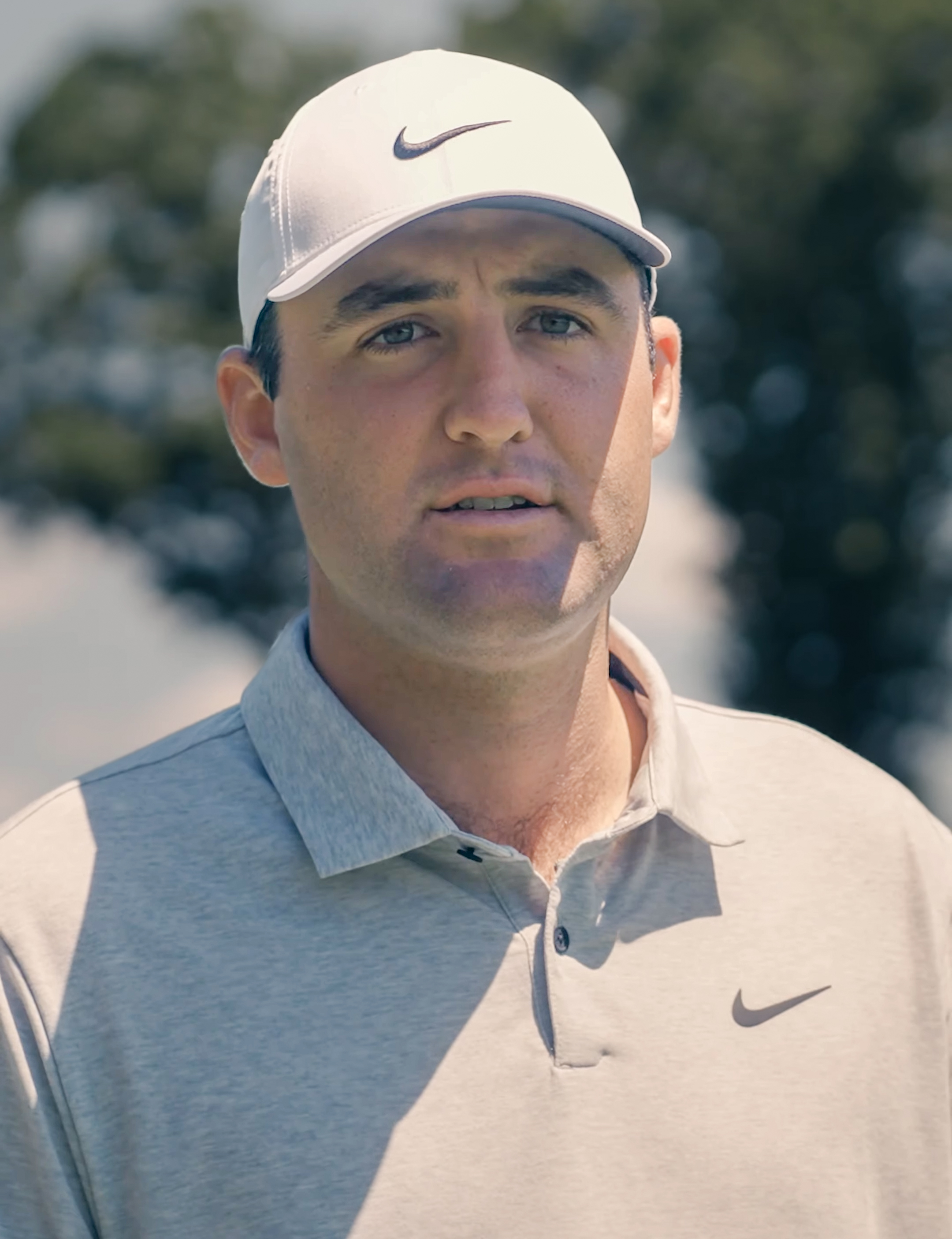
Scottie Scheffler won his first Masters title

External videos
- Full final round coverage on CBS on YouTube

Scottie Scheffler shot a one-under round of 71 to win his first Masters and major championship by three shots.

Scheffler began the final round with a three-shot lead but saw his advantage cut to one after Cameron Smith birdied his first two holes. Both players missed their drives left on the par-4 third hole and came up short on their second shots. Scheffler, playing first, hit a low shot that rolled into the hole for a birdie. Smith chipped past the hole and missed his par putt to fall back to three behind. Smith also bogeyed the par-3 fourth from the front greenside bunker. They both birdied the seventh after close approaches and Scheffler made the turn with a four-shot lead at 11-under.

On the 10th, Smith hooked his drive well left and was forced to pitch back out into the fairway, then missed a close putt for par. Scheffler, meanwhile, was in the middle of the fairway off the tee but hit his approach off the green to the left and failed to get up-and down. When Smith birdied the 11th hole by making a 15-foot putt, only the second birdie on the hole during the round, he cut the deficit to three heading to the 12th.

Smith's approach on the par-3 12th came up short and landed in Rae's Creek. Taking a drop and now playing his third shot, he hit over the green and ended up with a triple-bogey to fall out of contention. Scheffler also missed the green with his tee shot but was able to scramble and save par. After laying up on the par-5 13th and making par, Scheffler knocked his approach on 14 to five feet and made another birdie to get to 11-under. He also got up-and-down from over the green on the par-5 15th to increase his lead to five.

Rory McIlroy began the round 10 shots behind Scheffler before making four birdies on his front-nine. He then chipped in for birdie from over the green on the 10th, eagled the par-5 13th, and holed a shot from a greenside bunker on the 18th to shoot 64 (−8), tying a Masters record for the lowest final-round score. He finished at seven-under and moved up to solo second place, his best finish at the Masters. McIlroy shot the only bogey-free round of any player during the tournament in his final round.

With a five-shot lead playing 18th, Scheffler missed a birdie putt from the top shelf of the green, then missed two short putts and tapped in for double-bogey to finish at 10-under, three ahead of McIlroy. Smith recovered from another bogey on the 14th with two straight birdies on the 15th and 16th to finish at five-under and in a tie for third with Shane Lowry.

==== Final leaderboard ====
Champion
(a) = amateur
(c) = past champion

Top 10
Place	Player	Score	To par	Money (US$)
1	(United States) Scottie Scheffler	69-67-71-71=278	−10	2,700,000
2	(Northern Ireland) Rory McIlroy	73-73-71-64=281	−7	1,620,000
T3	(Republic of Ireland) Shane Lowry	73-68-73-69=283	−5	870,000
T3	(Australia) Cameron Smith	68-74-68-73=283	−5	870,000
5	(United States) Collin Morikawa	73-70-74-67=284	−4	600,000
T6	(Canada) Corey Conners	70-73-72-70=285	−3	521,250
T6	(United States) Will Zalatoris	71-72-75-67=285	−3	521,250
T8	(South Korea) Im Sung-jae	67-74-71-75=287	−1	450,000
T8	(United States) Justin Thomas	76-67-72-72=287	−1	450,000
T10	(United States) Cameron Champ	72-75-71-70=288	E	390,000
T10	(South Africa) Charl Schwartzel (c)	72-69-73-74=288	E	390,000

Leaderboard below the top 10
Place	Player	Score	To par	Money ($)
T12	(United States) Dustin Johnson (c)	69-73-75-72=289	+1	330,000
T12	(England) Danny Willett (c)	69-74-73-73=289	+1	330,000
T14	(England) Matt Fitzpatrick	71-73-76-70=290	+2	225,333
T14	(England) Tommy Fleetwood	75-72-70-73=290	+2	225,333
T14	(United States) Talor Gooch	72-74-73-71=290	+2	225,333
T14	(United States) Harry Higgs	71-75-73-71=290	+2	225,333
T14	(United States) Jason Kokrak	70-76-71-73=290	+2	225,333
T14	(Australia) Min Woo Lee	73-75-72-70=290	+2	225,333
T14	(Japan) Hideki Matsuyama (c)	72-69-77-72=290	+2	225,333
T14	(United States) Kevin Na	71-71-79-69=290	+2	225,333
T14	(England) Lee Westwood	72-74-73-71=290	+2	225,333
T23	(Spain) Sergio García (c)	72-74-74-71=291	+3	138,000
T23	(Scotland) Robert MacIntyre	73-73-76-69=291	+3	138,000
T23	(United States) J. J. Spaun	74-70-75-72=291	+3	138,000
T23	(United States) Harold Varner III	71-71-80-69=291	+3	138,000
T27	(Norway) Viktor Hovland	72-76-71-73=292	+4	111,000
T27	(Republic of Ireland) Séamus Power	74-74-74-70=292	+4	111,000
T27	(Spain) Jon Rahm	74-72-77-69=292	+4	111,000
T30	(United States) Lucas Glover	72-76-72-73=293	+5	93,150
T30	(United States) Russell Henley	73-74-76-70=293	+5	93,150
T30	(Australia) Marc Leishman	73-75-71-74=293	+5	93,150
T30	(Austria) Sepp Straka	74-72-76-71=293	+5	93,150
T30	(United States) Hudson Swafford	77-69-73-74=293	+5	93,150
T35	(United States) Tony Finau	71-75-74-74=294	+6	75,563
T35	(Chile) Joaquín Niemann	69-74-77-74=294	+6	75,563
T35	(United States) Patrick Reed (c)	74-73-73-74=294	+6	75,563
T35	(United States) Webb Simpson	71-74-73-76=294	+6	75,563
T39	(United States) Patrick Cantlay	70-75-79-71=295	+7	63,000
T39	(United States) Tom Hoge	73-74-75-73=295	+7	63,000
T39	(South Korea) Kim Si-woo	76-70-73-76=295	+7	63,000
T39	(United States) Bubba Watson (c)	73-73-78-71=295	+7	63,000
43	(United States) Billy Horschel	74-73-79-70=296	+8	55,500
T44	(South Africa) Christiaan Bezuidenhout	73-71-77-76=297	+9	51,000
T44	(United States) Kevin Kisner	75-70-75-77=297	+9	51,000
46	(Australia) Cameron Davis	75-73-79-73=300	+12	46,500
47	(United States) Tiger Woods (c)	71-74-78-78=301	+13	43,500
T48	(United States) Max Homa	74-73-77-78=302	+14	40,050
T48	(Australia) Adam Scott (c)	74-74-80-74=302	+14	40,050
T50	(United States) Daniel Berger	71-75-77-80=303	+15	37,350
T50	(Canada) Mackenzie Hughes	73-75-77-78=303	+15	37,350
52	(England) Tyrrell Hatton	72-74-79-80=305	+17	36,000
CUT	(United States) Sam Burns	75-74=149	+5	
CUT	(United States) Brian Harman	74-75=149	+5	
CUT	(Republic of Ireland) Pádraig Harrington	74-75=149	+5	
CUT	(United States) Zach Johnson (c)	74-75=149	+5	
CUT	(Japan) Takumi Kanaya	75-74=149	+5	
CUT	(South Korea) Lee Kyoung-hoon	74-75=149	+5	
CUT	(Australia) Lucas Herbert	74-76=150	+6	
CUT	(United States) Brooks Koepka	75-75=150	+6	
CUT	(United States) Ryan Palmer	75-75=150	+6	
CUT	(United States) Jordan Spieth (c)	74-76=150	+6	
CUT	(Canada) Mike Weir (c)	74-76=150	+6	
CUT	(Mexico) Abraham Ancer	72-79=151	+7	
CUT	(United States) Stewart Cink	76-75=151	+7	
CUT	(United States) Austin Greaser (a)	74-77=151	+7	
CUT	(Japan) Keita Nakajima (a)	72-79=151	+7	
CUT	(United States) Xander Schauffele	74-77=151	+7	
CUT	(Germany) Bernhard Langer (c)	76-76=152	+8	
CUT	(United States) Luke List	77-75=152	+8	
CUT	(Italy) Guido Migliozzi	75-77=152	+8	
CUT	(Italy) Francesco Molinari	78-74=152	+8	
CUT	(England) Justin Rose	76-76=152	+8	
CUT	(South Africa) Erik van Rooyen	73-79=152	+8	
CUT	(United States) Gary Woodland	75-77=152	+8	
CUT	(United States) Fred Couples (c)	75-79=154	+10	
CUT	(United States) Cameron Young	77-77=154	+10	
CUT	(South Africa) Garrick Higgo	72-83=155	+11	
CUT	(Cayman Islands) Aaron Jarvis (a)	81-74=155	+11	
CUT	(United States) Larry Mize (c)	77-78=155	+11	
CUT	(United States) James Piot (a)	81-74=155	+11	
CUT	(United States) Bryson DeChambeau	76-80=156	+12	
CUT	(Scotland) Sandy Lyle (c)	82-76=158	+14	
CUT	(Fiji) Vijay Singh (c)	78-80=158	+14	
CUT	(Belgium) Thomas Pieters	79-80=159	+15	
CUT	(United States) Matthew Wolff	81-78=159	+15	
CUT	(United States) Stewart Hagestad (a)	79-81=160	+16	
CUT	(Spain) José María Olazábal (c)	77-84=161	+17	
CUT	(England) Laird Shepherd (a)	81-85=166	+22	
WD	(South Africa) Louis Oosthuizen	76	+4	

==== Scorecard ====
Hole	Prior	1	2	3	4	5	6	7	8	9	10	11	12	13	14	15	16	17	18
Par		4	5	4	3	4	3	4	5	4	4	4	3	5	4	5	3	4	4
(United States) Scheffler	−9	−9	−9	−10	−10	−10	−10	−11	−11	−11	−10	−10	−10	−10	−11	−12	−12	−12	−10
(Northern Ireland) McIlroy	+1	E	E	−1	−1	−1	−1	−2	−3	−3	−4	−4	−4	−6	−6	−6	−6	−6	−7
(Republic of Ireland) Lowry	−2	−2	−3	−3	E	E	−1	−1	−2	−3	−3	−3	−2	−3	−3	−4	−4	−4	−5
(Australia) Smith	−6	−7	−8	−7	−6	−6	−6	−7	−7	−7	−6	−7	−4	−4	−3	−4	−5	−5	−5
(United States) Morikawa	+1	+1	E	E	+1	+2	+2	+1	E	−1	−1	E	E	−2	−2	−3	−3	−3	−4
(Canada) Conners	−1	−1	−2	−1	−1	−1	−2	−1	−2	−2	−1	−1	E	E	−1	−1	−1	−2	−3
(United States) Zalatoris	+2	+2	+3	+3	+3	+2	+2	+3	+2	+1	E	E	E	−1	−1	−2	−3	−3	−3
(South Korea) Im	−4	−4	−4	−4	−3	−3	−3	−4	−4	−3	−3	−2	−1	−2	−3	−2	−2	−2	−1
(United States) Thomas	−1	−1	−2	−1	−1	−2	−2	−3	−3	−3	−2	−1	+1	+1	E	−1	−2	−2	−1

Cumulative tournament scores, relative to par

Eagle	Birdie	Bogey	Double bogey	Triple bogey+

== Aftermath ==
=== Reaction from Scheffler ===
As is traditional, Scheffler was interviewed in Butler Cabin, where he discussed his victory:

"The shot on 3 was not one I expected to go in. It didn’t change the complexion of the day but it definitely got things rolling for me and I played some good golf after that. I can’t put into words what it means to be able to come back here for a lifetime. We’re going to go home and celebrate a little bit. I’m kind of glad I had a little hiccup on the last hole that made me a little less emotional so I can get through this interview!"
