= Derek Gillespie =

Canadian professional golfer (born 1978)

Personal information
- Nickname: D
- Nationality: Canada
- Born: 6 July 1978 (age 48) Oshawa, Ontario, Canada
- Height: 5 ft 9 in (1.75 m)
- Weight: 175 lb (79 kg; 12.5 st)

Career
- Sport: Golf
- College: University of Arizona
- Turned professional: 2000
- Current tour: Web.com Tour
- Former tour: Canadian Tour
- Professional wins: 3

Derek Gillespie (born 6 July 1978) is a Canadian professional golfer who has played on the Canadian Tour, where he has won twice and the Web.com Tour.

== Early life ==
In 1978, Gillespie was born in Oshawa, Ontario. He was a heralded junior golfer in Canada, playing in the 1995 and 1996 Canadian Junior National Teams and was named the top Canadian golfer for those two years.

== Amateur career ==
Gillespie attended the University of Arizona and was the only freshman to play in every tournament. His teammates included Rory Sabbatini and Camilo Villegas' caddie Gary Mathwes. He was named to the Pac-10 Conference Team twice and inducted into the University of Arizona Golf Hall of Fame in 2000.

== Professional career ==
In 2000, Gillespie turned professional the week of the Bell Canadian Open. In 2002, Gillespie started playing events on the Canadian Tour but did not find immediate success. He won two events there, the most recent in 2003 at the Corona Ixtapa Classic by 8 strokes. He missed getting to the final stage of PGA Tour qualifying school in 2006 and considered quitting his golf career. He then re-dedicated himself and made 13 of 14 cuts on the Canadian Tour in 2007, with three 2nd place finishes and a 3rd place finish on the Order of Merit. He has made only 1 of 4 cuts on the Canadian Tour in 2008.

He won The Big Break Prince Edward Island, a golf reality television show on the Golf Channel.

Gillespie played on the Web.com Tour in 2014 after earning his tour card through qualifying school.

== Awards and honors ==
- Gillespie earned Pac-10 Conference Team honors twice while at the University of Arizona.
- In 2000, he was and inducted into the University of Arizona Golf Hall of Fame.

== Professional wins (3) ==
=== Canadian Tour wins (2) ===
No.	Date	Tournament	Winning score	Margin of victory	Runner-up
1	May 5, 2002	Myrtle Beach Barefoot Championship	−5 (69-72-69-69=279)	3 strokes	(Australia) Scott Hend
2	May 17, 2003	Corona Ixtapa Classic	−23 (66-67-67-65=265)	8 strokes	(United States) Jim Salinetti

=== Other wins (1) ===
- 2016 Quebec Open

== Team appearances ==
Amateur

- Eisenhower Trophy (representing Canada): 2000
