= 2003 Canadian Tour =

Golf tour season

2003 Canadian Tour season
- Duration: February 13, 2003 – August 24, 2003
- Number of official events: 11
- Most wins: (United States) Rob Johnson (2)
- Order of Merit: (Canada) Jon Mills

The 2003 Canadian Tour was the 18th season of the Canadian Tour, the main professional golf tour in Canada since it was formed in 1986.

== Schedule ==
The following table lists official events during the 2003 season.

Date	Tournament	Location	Purse (C$)	Winner (Note: The number in parentheses after each winner's name is the number of Canadian Tour events they had won up to and including that tournament.)	OWGR points
Feb 16	TravelTex.com Canadian Tour Classic	United States	150,000	(Sweden) Anders Hultman (1)	6
Feb 23	TravelTex.com Canadian Tour Challenge	United States	150,000	(United States) Rob Johnson (1)	6
May 11	Michelin Guadalajara Classic	Mexico	150,000	(United States) Erik Compton (1)	6
May 17	Corona Ixtapa Classic	Mexico	150,000	(Canada) Derek Gillespie (2)	6
Jun 29	Northern Ontario Open	Ontario	175,000	(United States) Mario Tiziani (1)	6
Jul 13	MTS Classic	Manitoba	150,000	(Canada) Jon Mills (1)	6
Jul 20	Telus Edmonton Open	Alberta	150,000	(United States) Rob Johnson (2)	6
Jul 27	Victoria Open	British Columbia	175,000	(United States) Patrick Damron (1)	6
Aug 3	Greater Vancouver Classic	British Columbia	175,000	(Canada) James Lepp (a) (1)	6
Aug 17	Lewis Chitengwa Memorial Championship	United States	150,000	(United States) Nick Watney (1)	6
Aug 24	Bay Mills Open Players Championship	United States	235,000	(United States) Rodney Butcher (1)	6

== Order of Merit ==
The Order of Merit was based on prize money won during the season, calculated in Canadian dollars.

Position	Player	Prize money (C$)
1	(Canada) Jon Mills	55,321
2	(United States) Rob Johnson	54,164
3	(Canada) Derek Gillespie	47,844
4	(United States) Mark Johnson	47,451
5	(United States) Michael Harris	47,012
