= Taylor Pendrith =

Canadian professional golfer (born 1991)

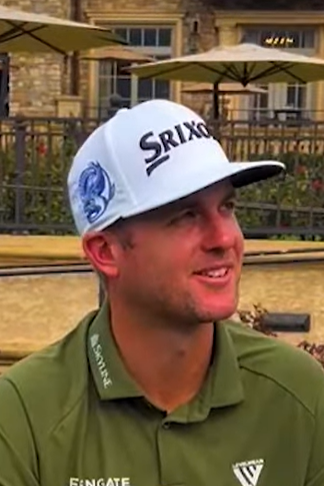

Personal information
- Nickname: Pendy
- Nationality: Canada
- Born: May 30, 1991 (age 35) Richmond Hill, Ontario, Canada

Career
- Sport: Golf
- College: Kent State University
- Turned professional: 2014
- Current tour: PGA Tour
- Former tours: Korn Ferry Tour; PGA Tour Canada
- Professional wins: 3
- Highest ranking: 35 (July 13, 2025) (as of October 25, 2026)

Number of wins by tour
- PGA Tour: 1
- Other: 2

Best results in major championships
- Masters Tournament: CUT: 2025
- PGA Championship: T5: 2025
- U.S. Open: T16: 2024
- The Open Championship: CUT: 2025

Taylor Pendrith (born May 30, 1991) is a Canadian professional golfer who plays on the PGA Tour. He has one PGA Tour victory which came in the May 2024 CJ Cup Byron Nelson. Previously, he won twice on PGA Tour Canada in 2019.

== Amateur career ==
While attending Bayview Secondary School in his hometown, Pendrith was awarded baseball MVP and 2008 Athlete of the year. Pendrith attended Kent State University from 2010 to 2014, where he was teammates with fellow Canadian PGA Tour pro golfers Corey Conners and Mackenzie Hughes. He made the cut in the 2014 Canadian Open and was the low amateur. He was part of the Canadian team that finished second, behind the United States, in the 2014 Eisenhower Trophy.

== Professional career ==
Pendrith turned professional in late 2014, after the Eisenhower Trophy. In 2015 he played mostly on PGA Tour Canada. He was runner-up three times and finished third in the Order of Merit to earn a place on the Web.com Tour. He finished tied for fourth place in the Club Colombia Championship, his second event on the 2016 Web.com Tour, but this was his only top-10 finish of the season and he missed the cut 14 times.

Pendrith played primarily on the Canadian Tour from 2017 to 2019. He had little success in 2017 and 2018, however in 2019 was runner-up in the Osprey Valley Open, then won the 1932 by Bateman Open and Mackenzie Investments Open to finish second in the Order of Merit and earn a place on the Korn Ferry Tour. Playing on the 2020 Korn Ferry Tour, Pendrith was runner-up in three consecutive tournaments in July and runner-up again in the Wichita Open in September. His performances on the Korn Ferry Tour earned him a place at the 2020 U.S. Open where he finished tied for 23rd place after a final round of 70.

Pendrith earned a promotion to the PGA Tour from the Korn Ferry Tour at the conclusion of the 2020–21 season.

In July 2022, Pendrith had his best finish to date on the PGA Tour with a T2 at the 2022 Rocket Mortgage Classic.

In September 2022, Pendrith was selected for the International team in the 2022 Presidents Cup, although he lost all four of the matches he played.

In May 2024, Pendrith won the CJ Cup Byron Nelson for his first PGA Tour win, in his 74th career PGA Tour start.

At the 2025 PGA Championship at the Quail Hollow Club in Charlotte, North Carolina, Pendrith tied for fifth, the highest finishing Canadian in the tournament, earning more than $600,000 in the process. It was only the fourth time in his career he made the cut in a major championship.

== Amateur wins ==
- 2013 Porter Cup, Mid-American Conference Championship
- 2014 Monroe Invitational

== Professional wins (3) ==
=== PGA Tour wins (1) ===
No.	Date	Tournament	Winning score	Margin of victory	Runner-up
1	May 5, 2024	CJ Cup Byron Nelson	−23 (64-67-63-67=261)	1 stroke	(United States) Ben Kohles

PGA Tour playoff record (0–1)

No.	Year	Tournament	Opponent	Result
1	2026	ISCO Championship	(United States) Steven Fisk	Lost to par on third extra hole

=== PGA Tour Canada wins (2) ===
No.	Date	Tournament	Winning score	Margin of victory	Runner-up
1	Aug 4, 2019	1932byBateman Open	−17 (69-67-69-62=267)	3 strokes	(United States) Lorens Chan
2	Sep 8, 2019	Mackenzie Investments Open	−28 (69-62-62-67=260)	8 strokes	(United States) Kyle Mueller

== Results in major championships ==
Results not in chronological order in 2020.

Tournament	2020	2021	2022	2023	2024	2025	2026
Masters Tournament						CUT	
PGA Championship				T29	CUT	T5	T44
U.S. Open	T23	CUT		CUT	T16	T38	
The Open Championship	NT					CUT	

Top 10
Did not play

CUT = missed the half-way cut
"T" = tied
NT = no tournament due to COVID-19 pandemic

=== Summary ===
Tournament	Wins	2nd	3rd	Top-5	Top-10	Top-25	Events	Cuts made
Masters Tournament	0	0	0	0	0	0	1	0
PGA Championship	0	0	0	1	1	1	4	3
U.S. Open	0	0	0	0	0	2	5	3
The Open Championship	0	0	0	0	0	0	1	0
Totals	0	0	0	1	1	3	11	6

- Most consecutive cuts made – 2 (2025 PGA Championship – 2025 U.S. Open)
- Longest streak of top-10s – 1 (once)

== Results in The Players Championship ==
Tournament	2022	2023	2024	2025	2026
The Players Championship	T13	T69	CUT	T38	T46

CUT = missed the halfway cut
"T" indicates a tie for a place

== Team appearances ==
Amateur

- Eisenhower Trophy (representing Canada): 2014

Professional

- Presidents Cup (representing the International team): 2022, 2024

== See also ==
- 2021 Korn Ferry Tour Finals graduates
