= John David Hahn =

German educator

Johann David Hahn (9 July 1729–9 March 1784) was a German educator.

Born in Heidelberg, Holy Roman Empire, he relocated to the Dutch Republic to pursue medicine and philosophy at Leiden University. After graduating with his doctorate, he began teaching at Utrecht University, working as Professor of philosophy, astronomy, and experimental physics (1753-1775), and then Professor of botany of chemistry (1759-1775). He was elected as a member of the American Philosophical Society in 1770.

After his time at Utrecht, he returned to Leiden and served as Professor of medicine at Leiden University, where he remained for the rest of his life. Hahn wrote prolifically on chemistry and toxicology and held public experiments and lectures on experimental physics and astronomy. He corresponded with many of his contemporary natural philosophers, including Benjamin Waterhouse and Benjamin Franklin. After nearly a decade in Leiden, his health began to fail and he died.
