= Corey Conners =

Canadian professional golfer (born 1992)

Personal information
- Full name: Corey Michael Conners
- Nationality: Canada
- Born: January 6, 1992 (age 34) Listowel, Ontario, Canada
- Height: 6 ft 0 in (183 cm)
- Weight: 190 lb (86 kg)
- Spouse: Malory Conners (m. 2018)

Career
- Sport: Golf
- College: Kent State University
- Turned professional: 2015
- Current tour: PGA Tour
- Former tours: Web.com Tour; PGA Tour Canada; PGA Tour Latinoamérica
- Professional wins: 2
- Highest ranking: 19 (May 18, 2025) (as of October 25, 2026)

Number of wins by tour
- PGA Tour: 2

Best results in major championships
- Masters Tournament: T6: 2022
- PGA Championship: T12: 2023
- U.S. Open: T9: 2024
- The Open Championship: T10: 2025

Corey Michael Conners (born January 6, 1992) is a Canadian professional golfer who currently plays on the PGA Tour. Conners has also played on the PGA Tour Canada, PGA Tour Latinoamérica and the Web.com Tour.

== Amateur career ==
Conners was raised in Listowel, Ontario. He won the 2010 Ontario Amateur. Conners played for Kent State University golf team between 2010 and 2014, where he was teammates with fellow Canadian PGA Tour pro golfers Mackenzie Hughes and Taylor Pendrith. He was runner-up to Gunn Yang at the 2014 U.S. Amateur at Atlanta Athletic Club, which earned him a spot in the field for the 2015 Masters Tournament. Though Conners missed the cut at the Masters, he was still the best scoring amateur at +5.

== Professional career ==
Following the 2015 Masters Conners turned professional, and played in the RBC Canadian Open in 2016. In December 2016, Conners tied for 42nd at the Web.com Tour qualifying tournament. By making the top 45, he earned a place on the Web.com Tour in 2017.

In March 2018, Conners held the 54-hole lead at the Valspar Championship in Florida, one stroke ahead of Justin Rose, Brandt Snedeker and Tiger Woods. In the fourth round, Conners shot 77 and finished T16. Conners ended the season 130th in the FedEx Cup, five spots out of full status for the 2019 season.

In October 2018, Conners finished second to Cameron Champ in the PGA Tour's Sanderson Farms Championship in Jackson, Mississippi, winning $475,200.

On April 7, 2019, Conners won the PGA Tour's Valero Texas Open by two strokes over Charley Hoffman, earning the final place in the 2019 Masters Tournament. Due to his conditional status, Conners had to play in a Monday qualifying event, where he earned the final spot after a six-man playoff. He became the first Monday qualifier to win on the PGA Tour since Arjun Atwal at the 2010 Wyndham Championship. The first place prize was $1,350,000. Conners finished the 2019 regular season in 31st place. He finished 21st at The Northern Trust and 7th at the BMW Championship, which earned him a spot at the Tour Championship.

Conners continued his strong play into the 2019–20 PGA season with 10 top-25 finishes, and one top-10 finish at the Zozo Championship. He finished the season with a FedEx Cup ranking of 53rd. Through the first 20 events of the 2021 season Conners had finished top-10 on seven occasions, and top-25 13 times: Most notably a 7th-place finish at the Players Championship and 8th place at the Masters. Conners was the leader after the first round of the 2021 PGA Championship with a first round score of 67 (five under par). However, Conners fell out of contention in the second round shooting a 3-over-par 75. He finished tied for 17th.

Conners qualified for the 2020 Summer Olympics in Tokyo.

Conners qualified for the International team at the 2022 Presidents Cup; he lost all four of the matches he played.

In April 2023, he won the Valero Texas Open for the second time and his second PGA Tour victory.

== Personal life ==
Conners is the son of Mike and Janet Conners. He has a twin sister, Nicole, and a younger sister, Sarah. He is married to Malory (Martin) Conners. He lives with his wife in Jupiter, Florida.

== Amateur wins ==
- 2010 Toyota Junior World Cup (tie), Ontario Amateur
- 2012 Mid-American Conference Championship, Gopher Invitational
- 2013 Gopher Invitational
- 2014 Jones Cup Invitational, General Hackler Championship (tie), Mid-American Conference Championship, Tailhade Cup (Argentina)
- 2015 Lake Macquarie Amateur

== Professional wins (2) ==
=== PGA Tour wins (2) ===
No.	Date	Tournament	Winning score	To par	Margin of victory	Runner-up
1	Apr 7, 2019	Valero Texas Open	69-67-66-66=268	−20	2 strokes	(United States) Charley Hoffman
2	Apr 2, 2023	Valero Texas Open (2)	64-72-69-68=273	−15	1 stroke	(United States) Sam Stevens

== Results in major championships ==
Results not in chronological order in 2020.

Tournament	2015	2016	2017	2018
Masters Tournament	CUT			
U.S. Open			CUT	
The Open Championship				
PGA Championship				

Tournament	2019	2020	2021	2022	2023	2024	2025	2026
Masters Tournament	T46	T10	T8	T6	CUT	T38	T8	T49
PGA Championship	T64	CUT	T17	CUT	T12	T26	T19	T55
U.S. Open		CUT	CUT	CUT	CUT	T9	WD	T23
The Open Championship	CUT	NT	T15	T28	T52	T25	T10	T14

Top 10
Did not play

CUT = missed the half-way cut
WD = withdrew
"T" indicates a tie for a place
NT = no tournament due to COVID-19 pandemic

=== Summary ===
Tournament	Wins	2nd	3rd	Top-5	Top-10	Top-25	Events	Cuts made
Masters Tournament	0	0	0	0	4	4	9	7
PGA Championship	0	0	0	0	0	3	8	6
U.S. Open	0	0	0	0	1	2	8	3
The Open Championship	0	0	0	0	1	4	7	6
Totals	0	0	0	0	6	13	32	22

- Most consecutive cuts made – 13 (2023 Open Championship – 2026 Open Championship, current)
- Longest streak of top-10s – 1 (six times)

== Results in The Players Championship ==
Tournament	2019	2020	2021	2022	2023	2024	2025	2026
The Players Championship	T41	C	7	T26	CUT	T13	T6	T13

Top 10
Did not play

CUT = missed the halfway cut
"T" indicates a tie for a place
C = canceled after the first round due to the COVID-19 pandemic

== Results in World Golf Championships ==
Tournament	2019	2020	2021	2022	2023
Championship		50			
Match Play		NT^{1}	T61	3	T17
Invitational	T27	T30	T36		
Champions	T20	NT^{1}	NT^{1}	NT^{1}	

^{1}Cancelled due to COVID-19 pandemic

Top 10
Did not play

NT = No tournament
"T" = Tied
Note that the Championship and Invitational were discontinued from 2022. The Champions was discontinued from 2023.

== Team appearances ==
Amateur

- Eisenhower Trophy (representing Canada): 2012, 2014

Professional

- Aruba Cup (representing PGA Tour Canada): 2016
- Presidents Cup (representing the International team): 2022, 2024, 2026

== See also ==
- 2017 Web.com Tour Finals graduates
