= Jon Mills =

Canadian professional golfer (born 1978)

Personal information
- Nationality: Canada
- Born: March 6, 1978 (age 48) Oshawa, Ontario, Canada
- Height: 5 ft 11 in (1.80 m)
- Weight: 184 lb (83 kg; 13.1 st)

Career
- Sport: Golf
- College: Kent State University
- Turned professional: 2002
- Former tours: Canadian Tour; PGA Tour; Web.com Tour
- Professional wins: 5

Number of wins by tour
- Korn Ferry Tour: 2
- Other: 3

Best results in major championships
- Masters Tournament: DNP
- PGA Championship: DNP
- U.S. Open: T36: 2008
- The Open Championship: DNP

Achievements and awards
- Canadian Tour Order of Merit winner: 2003

Jon Mills (born March 6, 1978) is a Canadian professional golfer.

== Early life ==
In 1978, Mills was born in Oshawa, Ontario. He spent most of his childhood in Belleville, Ontario. His father David Mills was involved with the game of golf and served as executive director for Golf Ontario. Mills' competitive game on the St. Lawrence Junior Tour in southeastern Ontario and won the Ontario Junior Championship in 1996.

== Amateur career ==
He earned a four-year golf scholarship to Kent State University. One of his teammates was future British Open champion Ben Curtis. Kent State team won the conference championship all four years he was there, from 1998 through 2001. In 2001, Mills finished in 6th place at the NCAA Championship. In 2001, he also won the Ontario Amateur Championship.

== Professional career ==
In 2001, Mills turned professional. Mills was a member of the PGA Tour's developmental tour early in his career. He also played on the PGA Tour Canada in 2002 and 2003. He won his first professional event on the Canadian Tour in 2003, and it helped him win the Order of Merit for the 2003 season.

In 2005, he earned a place on the PGA Tour by finishing 5th on the 2005 Nationwide Tour's money list.

In 2006, he did not have much success on the PGA Tour, making only 6 of 27 cuts. He returned to the Nationwide Tour once more. In 2007, however, he had much success on the developmental tour once again, finishing fourth on the money list among Nationwide Tour professionals. He earned right to play on the PGA Tour again. Mills played on the PGA Tour once more but did not finish high enough on the money list to retain his card for 2009.

Mills was appointed as the Men's Head Golf Coach at Kent State University in 2019. In 2021, he coached the team to a Mid-American Conference Championship victory. In 2021, he was also the Mid-American Conference's Coach of the Year.

== Personal life ==
Mills' brother, Jeff, played the PGA Tour Canada and is the Director of Golf at the Wildfire Golf Club in Ontario. His sister, Jennifer, is the Head Women's Volleyball Coach at Clarion University in Pennsylvania.

== Awards and honors ==
- In 1998, Mills was awarded the Mid-American Conference Freshman of the Year award.
- From 1999 through 2001, Mills earned All-Conference Team honors
- In 2000 and 2001, Mills earned All-American honors
- In 2001, his senior year, Mills earned with the Mid-American Golfer of the Year.
- In 2003, Mills won the Canadian Tour's Order of Merit.
- In 2021, Mills awarded the Kermit Blosser the Mid-American Conference Coach of the Year.
- Score Canadian Male Golfer of the Year - 2007.
- Inducted into Centennial High School Sports Hall of Fame - 2007.
- Inducted into Kent State University Sports Hall of Fame - 2007.
- 2021 Kermit Blosser Mid American Conference Coach of the Year

== Amateur wins ==
- 1996 Ontario Junior Championship
- 2001 NCAA Central Region Championship, Ontario Amateur Championship

== Professional wins (5) ==
=== Nationwide Tour wins (2) ===
No.	Date	Tournament	Winning score	Margin of victory	Runner-up
1	Jul 24, 2005	Canadian PGA Championship	−19 (68-67-63-71=269)	3 strokes	(United States) Ken Duke
2	Sep 23, 2007	Albertsons Boise Open	−21 (65-68-66-64=263)	1 stroke	(United States) D. A. Points

=== Canadian Tour wins (1) ===
No.	Date	Tournament	Winning score	Margin of victory	Runner-up
1	Jul 13, 2003	MTS Classic	−9 (67-65-72-71=275)	3 strokes	(Canada) Bryan DeCorso

=== Other wins (2) ===
- 2003 Toledo Open
- 2014 West Penn Open

== Results in major championships ==
Tournament	2007	2008	2009	2010	2011
U.S. Open	CUT	T36			CUT

Did not play

CUT = missed the half-way cut
"T" indicates a tie for a place
Note: Mills only played in the U.S. Open.

== Team appearances ==
Amateur

- 1996 Ontario Provincial Junior Team.
- 2001 Ontario Willingdon Cup Team.
- Golf Canada National Team - 1999 to 2001.
- 1999 Canadian Amateur Team - World Amateur Preview, Germany
- Eisenhower Trophy World Amateur(representing Canada): 2000
- 2001 Canadian 4 Nations Cup - Won (Australia, New Zealand, Japan.)

== See also ==
- 2005 Nationwide Tour graduates
- 2007 Nationwide Tour graduates
