= Mackenzie Hughes =

Canadian professional golfer (born 1990)

Personal information
- Full name: Mackenzie Robert Hughes
- Nationality: Canada
- Born: November 23, 1990 (age 35) Hamilton, Ontario, Canada
- Height: 6 ft 0 in (1.83 m)
- Weight: 170 lb (77 kg; 12 st)
- Spouse: Jenna Shaw (m. 2016)
- Children: 3

Career
- Sport: Golf
- College: Kent State University
- Turned professional: 2012
- Current tour: PGA Tour
- Former tours: PGA Tour Canada; Web.com Tour
- Professional wins: 4
- Highest ranking: 39 (November 21, 2020) (as of November 15, 2026)

Number of wins by tour
- PGA Tour: 2
- Korn Ferry Tour: 1
- Other: 1

Best results in major championships
- Masters Tournament: T29: 2023
- PGA Championship: T58: 2020
- U.S. Open: T15: 2021
- The Open Championship: T6: 2021

Achievements and awards
- PGA Tour Canada Order of Merit winner: 2013

Mackenzie Robert Hughes (born November 23, 1990) is a Canadian professional golfer.

== Early life and amateur career ==
Hughes was born in Hamilton, Ontario. He is a graduate of Kent State University, where he played on the golf team with fellow Canadian PGA Tour pro golfers Taylor Pendrith and Corey Conners. Hughes won the 2011 and 2012 Canadian Amateur Championship.

Hughes was the number one Canadian Amateur in 2011. He was a member of Team Canada's National Squad in 2008, 2011, and 2012.

== Professional career ==
Hughes turned professional in 2012 and played on the eGolf Professional Tour and PGA Tour Canada. He played in 2012 and 2013 Canadian Opens but missed the cut in both events.

In June 2013, Hughes qualified for the U.S. Open, winning a playoff at his sectional qualifying site. He won his first professional tournament at the 2013 Cape Breton Celtic Classic on PGA Tour Canada. He would go on to win the 2013 PGA Tour Canada Order of Merit and earn a Web.com Tour card for 2014, fully exempt as the money leader. Hughes made seven cuts in twenty events, finishing well outside retaining any status. After spending the 2015 season on PGA Tour Canada, he earned Web.com Tour status for 2016 through Q School. In August 2016, he won the Price Cutter Charity Championship en route to graduating to the PGA Tour for the 2016–17 season.

In November 2016, in his fifth PGA Tour start as a member, Hughes won the RSM Classic, becoming the first Canadian-born golfer to win on the PGA Tour since Nick Taylor at the 2014 Sanderson Farms Championship, and the first to win a non-alternate event since Mike Weir at the 2007 Fry's Electronics Open. He was also the first rookie in over 20 years (Tim Herron at the 1996 Honda Classic) to win wire-to-wire.

In 2017, he finished 10th at the AT&T Pebble Beach Pro-Am, 16th at The Players Championship, and 13th at the Dell Technologies Championship.

In March 2019, Hughes finished tied for second at the PGA Tour's Corales Puntacana Resort and Club Championship. He lost by one stroke to winner Graeme McDowell.

In March 2020, Hughes finished second at The Honda Classic finishing one stroke behind champion Im Sung-jae. He shot 66-66 on the weekend. In June he finished tied for third place in the Travelers Championship and entered the top 100 in the world rankings for the first time.

Hughes held the lead after the third round at the 2021 U.S. Open but finished T15. He was also in contention at the 2021 Open Championship, eventually finishing T6 and recording the best ever finish for a Canadian at The Open Championship.

In October 2022, Hughes won his second PGA Tour title at the Sanderson Farms Championship in a playoff over Sepp Straka.

== Amateur wins ==
- 2010 Fireline Towson Invitational, Bank of Tennessee
- 2011 Canadian Amateur, Glencoe Invitational, Mid-American Conference Championship
- 2012 Canadian Amateur

== Professional wins (4) ==
=== PGA Tour wins (2) ===
No.	Date	Tournament	Winning score	To par	Margin of victory	Runner(s)-up
1	Nov 21, 2016	RSM Classic	61-67-68-69=265	−17	Playoff	(United States) Blayne Barber, (United States) Billy Horschel, (Sweden) Henrik Norlander, (Colombia) Camilo Villegas
2	Oct 2, 2022	Sanderson Farms Championship	71-63-68-69=271	−17	Playoff	(Austria) Sepp Straka

PGA Tour playoff record (2–1)

No.	Year	Tournament	Opponent(s)	Result
1	2016	RSM Classic	(United States) Blayne Barber, (United States) Billy Horschel, (Sweden) Henrik Norlander, (Colombia) Camilo Villegas	Won with par on third extra hole Horschel eliminated by par on first hole
2	2022	Sanderson Farms Championship	(Austria) Sepp Straka	Won with birdie on second extra hole
3	2025	Oneflight Myrtle Beach Classic	(New Zealand) Ryan Fox, (United States) Harry Higgs	Fox won with birdie on first extra hole

=== Web.com Tour wins (1) ===
No.	Date	Tournament	Winning score	To par	Margin of victory	Runner-up
1	Aug 14, 2016	Price Cutter Charity Championship	67-67-64-66=264	−24	1 stroke	(United States) Richy Werenski

=== PGA Tour Canada wins (1) ===
No.	Date	Tournament	Winning score	To par	Margin of victory	Runner-up
1	Sep 8, 2013	Cape Breton Celtic Classic	68-69-71-66=274	−14	1 stroke	(Canada) Ryan Williams

== Results in major championships ==
Results not in chronological order in 2020.

Tournament	2013	2014	2015	2016	2017	2018
Masters Tournament					CUT	
U.S. Open	CUT					CUT
The Open Championship						
PGA Championship					CUT	

Tournament	2019	2020	2021	2022	2023	2024	2025
Masters Tournament			T40	T50	T29		
PGA Championship		T58	CUT	CUT	CUT	CUT	CUT
U.S. Open		CUT	T15	T24	T49	CUT	T50
The Open Championship		NT	T6	CUT		T16	CUT

Top 10
Did not play

CUT = missed the half-way cut
"T" = tied
NT = no tournament due to COVID-19 pandemic

=== Summary ===
Tournament	Wins	2nd	3rd	Top-5	Top-10	Top-25	Events	Cuts made
Masters Tournament	0	0	0	0	0	0	4	3
PGA Championship	0	0	0	0	0	0	7	1
U.S. Open	0	0	0	0	0	2	8	4
The Open Championship	0	0	0	0	1	2	4	2
Totals	0	0	0	0	1	4	23	10

- Most consecutive cuts made – 3 (2021 U.S. Open – 2022 Masters)
- Longest streak of top-10s – 1 (2021 Open)

== Results in The Players Championship ==
Tournament	2017	2018	2019	2020	2021	2022	2023	2024	2025	2026
The Players Championship	T16	T57		C	CUT	CUT	CUT	T26	CUT	CUT

Did not play

CUT = missed the halfway cut
"T" indicates a tie for a place
C = canceled after the first round due to the COVID-19 pandemic

== Results in World Golf Championships ==
Tournament	2017	2018	2019	2020	2021	2022	2023
Championship	T32				T44		
Match Play				NT^{1}	R16	T18	QF
Invitational	T66			T44			
Champions				NT^{1}	NT^{1}	NT^{1}	

^{1}Canceled due to COVID-19 pandemic

Top 10
Did not play

QF, R16, R32, R64 = Round in which player lost in match play
NT = No tournament
"T" = Tied
Note that the Championship and Invitational were discontinued from 2022. The Champions was discontinued from 2023.

== Team appearances ==
Amateur

- Eisenhower Trophy (representing Canada): 2012

Professional

- Presidents Cup (representing the International team): 2024

== See also ==
- 2016 Web.com Tour Finals graduates
