= Ryan Yip =

Canadian golfer

Personal information
- Nationality: Canada
- Born: December 7, 1984 (age 41) Calgary, Alberta, Canada
- Height: 5 ft 10 in (1.78 m)
- Weight: 175 lb (79 kg; 12.5 st)

Career
- Sport: Golf
- College: Kent State University
- Turned professional: 2006
- Current tour: Web.com Tour
- Former tours: PGA Tour Canada; Asian Tour
- Professional wins: 3

Best results in major championships
- Masters Tournament: DNP
- PGA Championship: DNP
- U.S. Open: CUT: 2013
- The Open Championship: DNP

Ryan Yip (born December 7, 1984) is a Canadian professional golfer who currently plays on the Web.com Tour.

== Amateur career ==
Yip was born in Calgary, Alberta. He won the 2002 Alberta Amateur and in 2006 was a semifinalist at the U.S. Amateur and the Canadian Amateur. He played college golf at Kent State University where he won three tournaments. While at Kent State he was named the Mid-American Conference Freshman of the Year in 2003 and the MAC Co-Golfer of the year in 2005. He was also named to the All MAC first team from 2003 to 2006 and was named to the All Mid-West team in 2005 and 2006. He turned professional in 2006.

== Professional career ==
Yip has played on PGA Tour Canada since 2007, when it was known as the Canadian Tour. He picked up his first professional win in a non-tour event at the Alberta Open in May 2009. In August he picked up his first Canadian Tour victory at the Jane Rogers Championship.

Yip played on the Web.com Tour in 2012 but made only four cuts in 17 tournaments and lost his tour card.

== Amateur wins ==
- 2002 Alberta Amateur

== Professional wins (3) ==
=== Canadian Tour wins (1) ===
No.	Date	Tournament	Winning score	To par	Margin of victory	Runners-up
1	Aug 9, 2009	Roxul Jane Rogers Championship	73-68-68-69=278	−6	Playoff	(United States) Jeff Cuzzort, (United States) Trey Denton

=== Asian Development Tour wins (1) ===
No.	Date	Tournament	Winning score	To par	Margin of victory	Runner-up
1	Sep 27, 2014	Port Dickson Championship I^{1}	69-67-65-63=264	−20	1 stroke	(Malaysia) Khor Kheng Hwai

^{1}Co-sanctioned by the Professional Golf of Malaysia Tour

=== Other wins (1) ===
- 2009 Alberta Open

== Results in major championships ==
Tournament	2013
U.S. Open	CUT

CUT = missed the halfway cut
Note: Yip only played in the U.S. Open.
