= Rich Harvest Farms =

Private golf course in Illinois, United States

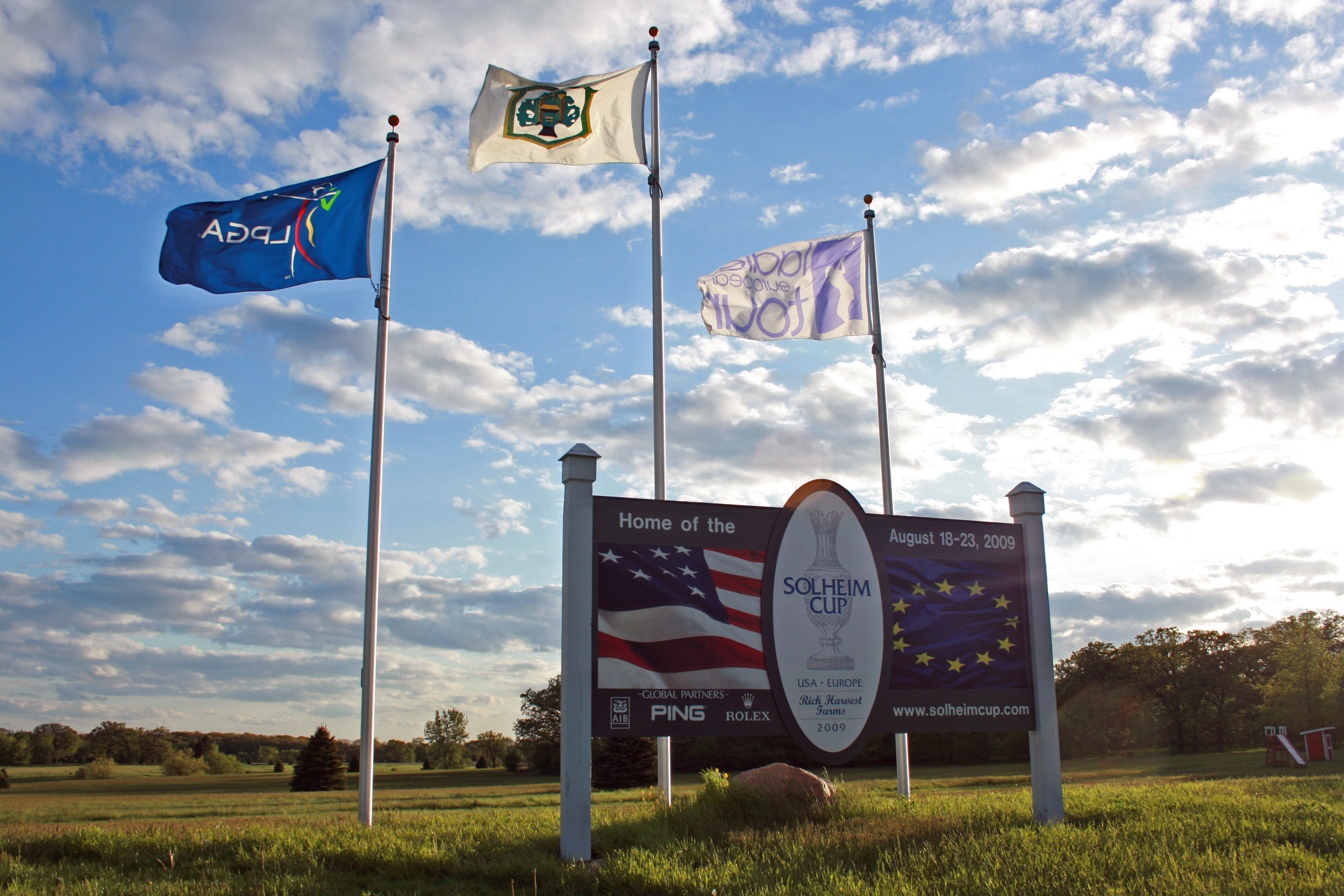
- Solheim Cup sign in 2009

- Location in the United States
- 41.754°N 88.487°W

Club information
- Location: Big Rock Township, near Sugar Grove, Illinois
- Established: 1989
- Type: Private
- Owner: Mr. Jerry Rich
- Total holes: 18
- Tournaments: Western Junior (2003, 2019); NCAA Men's & Women's Championships (2017); Arnold Palmer Cup (2015); Western Amateur (2015); Solheim Cup (2009); NCAA Regional Men's Golf Championships(2007,2014); Ryder Cup Captain's Challenge (2012); LIV Golf Chicago (2022-2023)
- Website: richharvestfarms.com

Rich Harvest Links
- Designed by: Jerry Rich
- Par: 72
- Length: 7,735 yards (7,073 m)
- Course rating: 79.1
- Slope rating: 155

Rich Harvest Farms is a private golf course and country club near Sugar Grove, Illinois, about 50 miles (80 km) west of downtown Chicago. Built in 1989 and expanded in 1999, the 18-hole championship golf course is on an expansive 1,800 acres (7.3 km^{2}).

== Owner ==
Jerome "Jerry" Rich, the estate's owner and president, is a businessman and alumnus of Northern Illinois University. Rich's father, Anthony "AJ" Rich started his own company – Rich Inc – where Jerry went to work after graduation. Not long after he started working for his father's company, he invented a method to incorporate many separate stock exchange software programs into one, putting Rich Inc. on the map.

== Course accolades ==
In 1999, Rich Harvest Links was named the fifth-best new private course in the U.S. by Golf Digest. The course made its debut on Golf Digest's list of "America's Top 100 Golf Courses" in 2003. Measuring over 7,700 yards (7,000 m) from the professional tees, the course requires precision with every shot. The famous fourth hole, Devil's Elbow, has one of the most intimidating tree-lined tee boxes and fairways of any golf course. Rich Harvest Farms is also the home course of the Northern Illinois University Huskies men's and women's golf teams of Northern Illinois University in nearby DeKalb. In addition to a golf course and several private residences, the 2,200-acre (8.9 km^{2}) rural site houses several antique stage coaches and a collection of vintage and modern vehicles.

== Public events ==
Rich Harvest Farms hosted the Solheim Cup in 2009. The course was used for the Ryder Cup Captain's Challenge in 2012. The primary competition was held at Medinah Country Club in Medinah, Illinois.

Rich Harvest Farms hosted the fifth event in 2022 of the LIV Golf Invitational Series.

=== Past events ===
- 2003 Mid-American Conference Championship
- 2007 NCAA Regional
- 2009 Solheim Cup
- 2011-2018 Northern Intercollegiate
- 2012 Mid-American Conference Championship
- 2013 Chip Beck #59 Charity Pro-Am
- 2014 NCAA Regional
- 2015 Palmer Cup
- 2015 Western Amateur
- 2017 NCAA Men's & Women's Championships
- 2019 Western Junior Championship
- 2020 Big Ten Men's Golf Championships
- 2021 Arnold Palmer Cup
- 2022-2023 LIV Golf Chicago

== Gallery ==
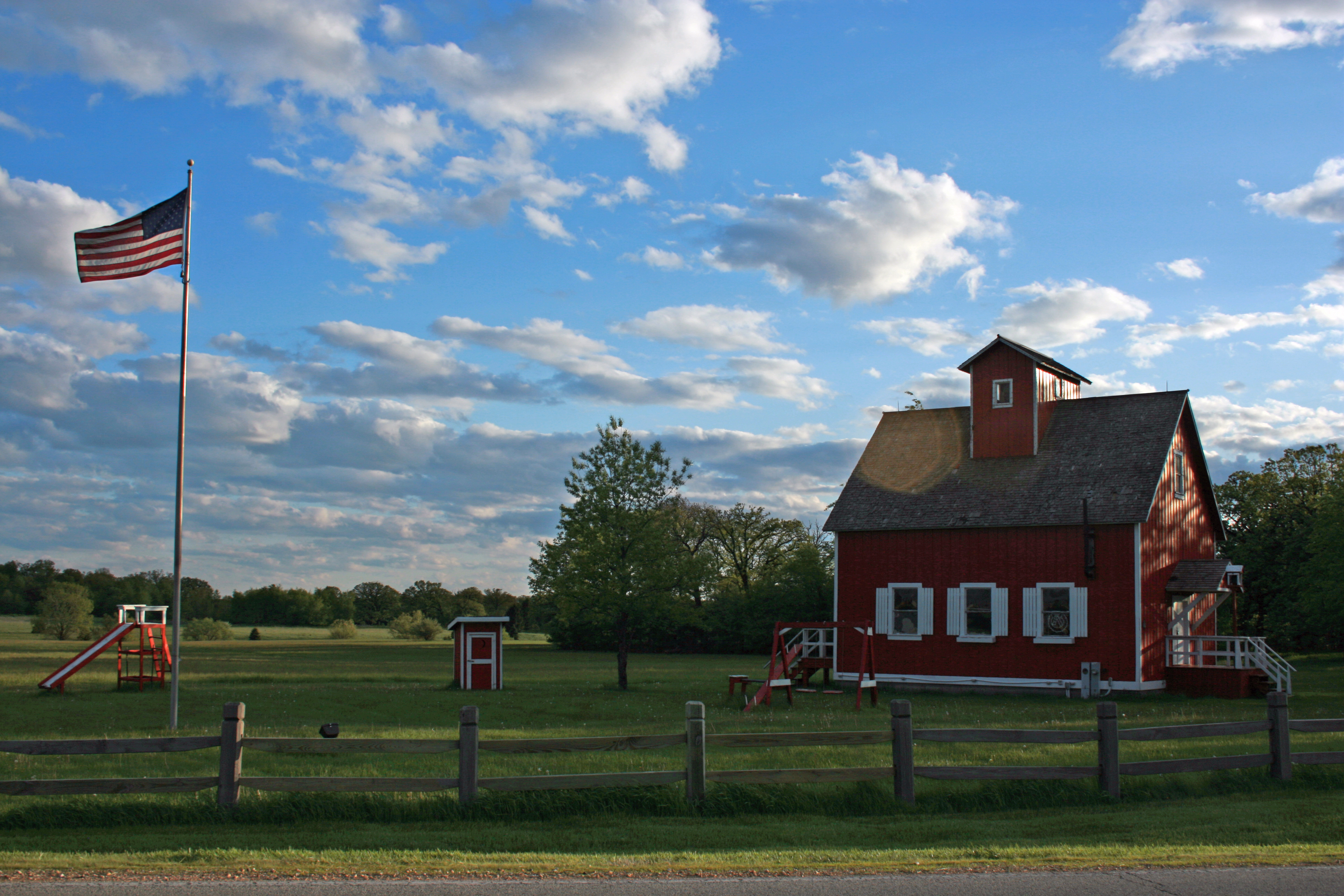
Schoolhouse display

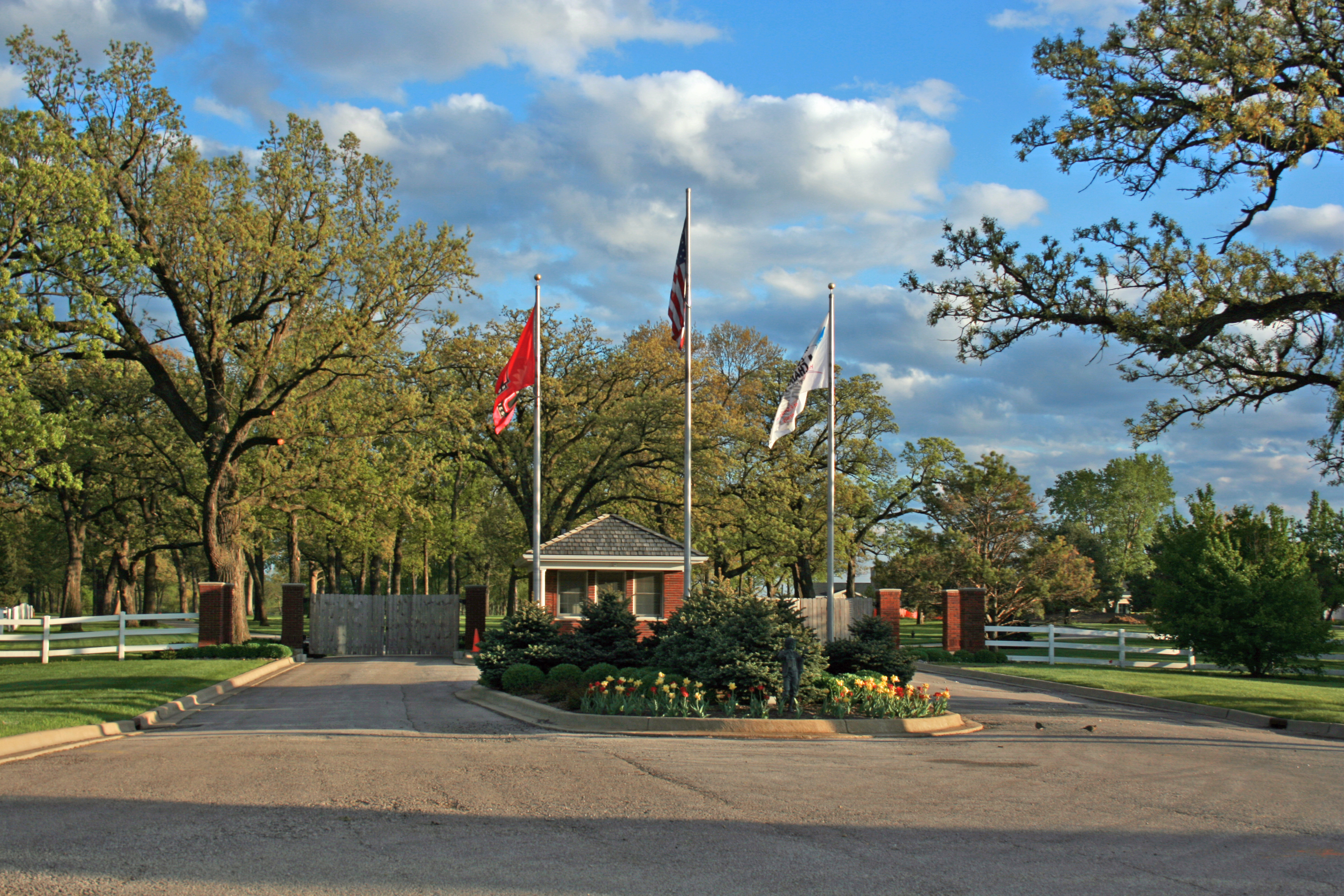
Entrance to golf course

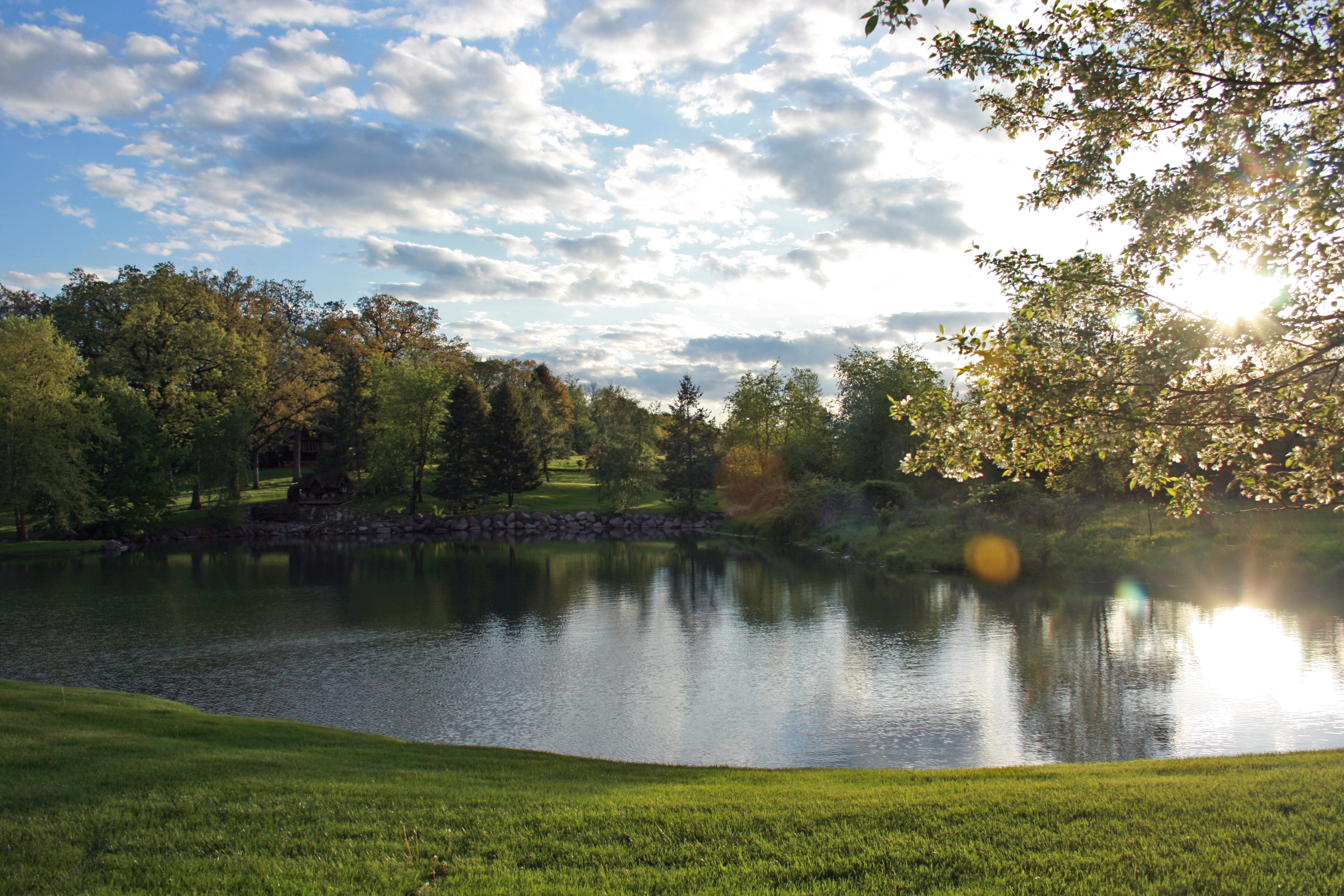
East side of golf course

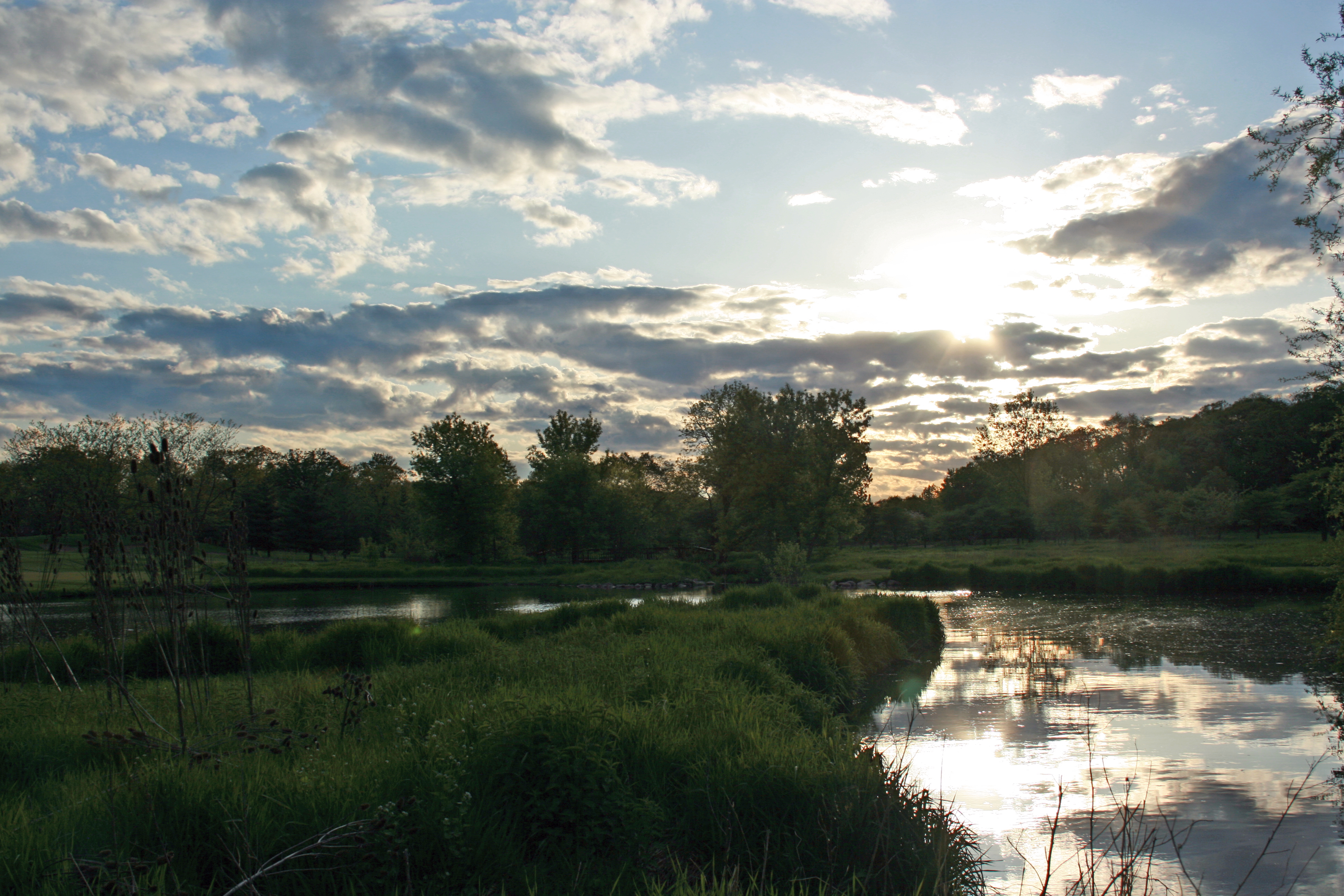
East side of golf course
