= John Hahn (golfer) =

American professional golfer (born 1989)

Personal information
- Nationality: United States
- Born: February 6, 1989 (age 37) Columbus, Ohio, U.S.
- Height: 5 ft 11 in (1.80 m)
- Weight: 187 lb (85 kg; 13.4 st)

Career
- Sport: Golf
- College: Kent State University
- Turned professional: 2011
- Current tour: Challenge Tour
- Former tour: European Tour

Best results in major championships
- Masters Tournament: DNP
- PGA Championship: DNP
- U.S. Open: CUT: 2013
- The Open Championship: DNP

John Hahn (born February 6, 1989) is an American professional golfer who previously competed on the European Tour.

== Amateur career ==
Hahn played college golf at Kent State University. He was a three-time All-American and two-time Academic All-American. He also won the 2009 Western Amateur.

== Professional career ==
Hahn qualified for the 2013 U.S. Open where he missed the cut.

Hahn earned his 2014 European Tour via qualifying school. After finishing 120th in the Race to Dubai, he had to re-qualify again in 2014. In the fourth round of a six-round qualifying school tournament, Hahn became one of four golfers in history to shoot a round of 58 in a professional tournament. Hahn's 58 came on the Tour Course at the PGA Catalunya Resort. The following day, Hahn shot a 78 at the nearby Stadium Course, taking him out of contention for the tournament. He finished the tournament in 50th place at 2-under-par. His best professional finish is third, which he achieved at the 2014 Africa Open.

== Awards and honors ==
Hahn was a three-time All-American and two-time Academic All-American at Kent State University.

== Amateur wins ==
- 2009 Towson University Invitational, Mid-American Conference Championship, Western Amateur
- 2010 Mid-American Conference Championship (tie), The Gopher Invitational
- 2011 Annual Louisiana Classics, Fireline Towson Invitational, Robert Kepler Intercollegiate (tie)

== Results in major championships ==
Tournament	2013
Masters Tournament	
U.S. Open	CUT
The Open Championship	
PGA Championship	

Did not play

CUT = missed the half-way cut

== See also ==
- 2013 European Tour Qualifying School graduates
