= Bryan DeCorso =

Canadian professional golfer

Personal information
- Nationality: Canada
- Born: May 29, 1971 (age 55) Guelph, Ontario, Canada
- Height: 6 ft 0 in (1.83 m)
- Weight: 180 lb (82 kg; 13 st)

Career
- Sport: Golf
- College: Kent State University
- Turned professional: 1995
- Former tours: Web.com Tour; Canadian Tour
- Professional wins: 2

Number of wins by tour
- Korn Ferry Tour: 1
- Other: 1

Bryan DeCorso (born May 29, 1971) is a Canadian professional golfer.

== Early life and amateur career ==
DeCorso was born in Guelph, Ontario. He got started in golf with his father, playing at the Victoria Park East course in Guelph. He earned a golf scholarship to Kent State University. He finished as runner-up to Warren Sye at the 1994 Canadian Amateur Championship.

== Professional career ==
In 1994, DeCorso turned professional and won an event during his 1996 rookie season on the Canadian Professional Golf Tour.

Struggles with his form led DeCorso to take a job as an on-course commentator during Canadian Tour coverage on The Golf Channel from 2001 to 2003, and he left golf altogether for nine months in 2004, working with his father as a building contractor. He returned to pro golf on mini-tours based in Florida, and gradually regained his form and interest.

DeCorso earned full Nationwide Tour playing privileges in the 2007 PGA Tour qualifying process. Working with a new instructor, Greg Towne, he finished fourth at the Henrico County Open in late April 2008, and then won the 2008 South Georgia Classic the next week. He had a good chance to qualify for the 2009 PGA Tour, but finished 50th in the Nationwide Tour Championship, and failed to make it into the top 25. The top 25 money leaders on the Nationwide Tour money list at the end of the season automatically receive PGA Tour cards.

== Professional wins (2) ==
=== Nationwide Tour wins (1) ===
| No. | Date | Tournament | Winning score | Margin of victory | Runners-up |
|---|---|---|---|---|---|
| 1 | May 5, 2008 | South Georgia Classic | −14 (68-69-68-69=274) | 4 strokes | (United States) Bryce Molder, (England) Greg Owen |

=== Canadian Tour wins (1) ===
| No. | Date | Tournament | Winning score | Margin of victory | Runner-up |
|---|---|---|---|---|---|
| 1 | Jun 16, 1996 | Morningstar Classic | −11 (70-65-74-68=277) | 2 strokes | (United States) Notah Begay III |

== Team appearances ==
Amateur

- Eisenhower Trophy (representing Canada): 1994
