= NCAA Division I men's golf tournament all-time team records =

The following is a list of National Collegiate Athletic Association (NCAA) Division I college golf team statistics and records through the 2026 NCAA Division I men's golf championship. The NCAA began sponsoring the national collegiate championship in 1939. Before that year the event was conducted by the National Intercollegiate Golf Association.

== Tournament match play records, since 2009 ==
| School | Playoffs | Matches won | Matches lost | Percentage | Years |
|---|---|---|---|---|---|
| Alabama | 4 | 9 | 2 | 0.818 | 2012, 2013, 2014, 2018 |
| Arizona | 1 | 1 | 1 | 0.500 | 2026 |
| Arizona State | 6 | 3 | 6 | 0.333 | 2009, 2013, 2021, 2022, 2023, 2025 |
| Arkansas | 1 | 2 | 1 | 0.667 | 2009 |
| Auburn | 4 | 7 | 2 | 0.778 | 2018, 2024, 2025, 2026 |
| Augusta | 2 | 6 | 0 | 1.000 | 2010, 2011 |
| Baylor | 1 | 0 | 1 | 0.000 | 2017 |
| California | 2 | 2 | 2 | 0.500 | 2012, 2013 |
| Duke | 2 | 2 | 2 | 0.500 | 2011, 2018 |
| Florida | 3 | 4 | 2 | 0.667 | 2023, 2025, 2026 |
| Florida State | 4 | 1 | 1 | 0.500 | 2010, 2021, 2023, 2024 |
| Georgia | 3 | 4 | 3 | 0.571 | 2009, 2011, 2015 |
| Georgia Tech | 6 | 4 | 6 | 0.400 | 2010, 2011, 2013, 2014, 2023, 2024 |
| Illinois | 9 | 5 | 9 | 0.357 | 2011, 2013, 2014, 2015, 2016, 2017, 2021, 2023, 2024 |
| Kent State | 1 | 0 | 1 | 0.000 | 2012 |
| LSU | 3 | 3 | 2 | 0.600 | 2014, 2015, 2016 |
| Michigan | 1 | 1 | 1 | 0.500 | 2009 |
| Mississippi | 1 | 1 | 1 | 0.500 | 2025 |
| New Mexico | 1 | 0 | 1 | 0.000 | 2013 |
| North Carolina | 4 | 1 | 4 | 0.200 | 2021, 2022, 2023, 2024 |
| Ohio State | 2 | 1 | 2 | 0.333 | 2011, 2024 |
| Oklahoma | 7 | 5 | 6 | 0.455 | 2016, 2017, 2018, 2019, 2021, 2022, 2025 |
| Oklahoma State | 11 | 13 | 9 | 0.591 | 2009, 2010, 2011, 2014, 2017, 2018, 2019, 2021, 2022, 2025, 2026 |
| Oregon | 4 | 7 | 3 | 0.700 | 2010, 2012, 2016, 2017 |
| Pepperdine | 3 | 4 | 2 | 0.667 | 2021, 2022, 2023 |
| San Diego State | 1 | 0 | 1 | 0.000 | 2012 |
| South Carolina | 1 | 0 | 1 | 0.000 | 2016 |
| South Florida | 1 | 0 | 1 | 0.000 | 2015 |
| Southern California | 4 | 3 | 4 | 0.429 | 2009, 2015, 2016, 2017 |
| SMU | 2 | 0 | 2 | 0.000 | 2014, 2019 |
| Stanford | 4 | 3 | 3 | 0.500 | 2010, 2014, 2019, 2026 |
| Texas | 9 | 10 | 7 | 0.588 | 2012, 2013, 2015, 2016, 2018, 2019, 2022, 2025, 2026 |
| Texas A&M | 3 | 3 | 2 | 0.600 | 2009, 2018, 2019 |
| Texas Tech | 3 | 0 | 3 | 0.000 | 2010, 2018, 2022 |
| UCLA | 5 | 2 | 5 | 0.286 | 2011, 2012, 2014, 2015, 2026 |
| UNLV | 2 | 0 | 2 | 0.000 | 2013, 2017 |
| Vanderbilt | 8 | 3 | 8 | 0.273 | 2015, 2016, 2017, 2019, 2021, 2022, 2024, 2026 |
| Virginia | 2 | 0 | 2 | 0.000 | 2023, 2024 |
| Wake Forest | 1 | 0 | 1 | 0.000 | 2019 |
| Washington | 3 | 0 | 3 | 0.000 | 2009, 2010, 2012 |

== Team records ==
through 2026

- Most consecutive team appearances, NCAA Regionals: 37
  - Oklahoma State (1989–2026)
- Most consecutive team appearances, NCAA Championships: 65
  - Oklahoma State (1947–2011)
- Best team score (in relation to par), two rounds: 553 (−23)
  - UNLV, 1998 (Chris Berry–138, Bill Lunde–138, Charley Hoffman–138, Jeremy Anderson–139, Scott Lander–143)
- Best team score (in relation to par), three rounds: 824 (−16)
  - California, 2013 (Max Homa–201, Brandon Hagy–205, Michael Kim–212, Michael Weaver–214)
- Best team score (in relation to par), four rounds: 1,116 (−36)
  - Oklahoma State, 2000 (Charles Howell III–265, Landry Mahan–281, Andres Hultman–288, Edward Loar–288, J. C. DeLeon–295)
  - Georgia Tech, 2000 (Matt Weibring–276, Carlton Forrester–282, Bryce Molder–282, Matt Kuchar–283, Troy Matteson–285)
- Greatest margin of victory, strokes: 33
  - Wake Forest, 1975
