= 1979 NCAA Division I golf championship =

1979 NCAA Division I Golf Championship
Tournament information
- Location: Winston-Salem, North Carolina, U.S. 36.003759°N 80.422124°W
- Course: Bermuda Run Country Club

Statistics
- Field: 28 teams

Champion
- Team: Ohio State (2nd title); Individual: Gary Hallberg, Wake Forest

Location map
- Location in the United States Location in North Carolina

The 1979 NCAA Division I Golf Championship was the 41st annual NCAA-sanctioned golf tournament to determine the individual and team national champions of men's collegiate golf at the University Division level in the United States.

The tournament was held at the Bermuda Run Country Club in Winston-Salem, North Carolina, hosted by Wake Forest University.

Ohio State won the team championship, the Buckeyes' second NCAA title and first since 1945.

Gary Hallberg, from Wake Forest, won the individual title.

For the first time, teams needed to be in the top fifteen after three rounds of play to qualify for the fourth and final championship round; all other team were cut.

== Individual results ==
=== Individual champion ===
- Gary Hallberg, Wake Forest

== Team results ==
Rank	Team	Score
1	Ohio State	1,189
2	Oklahoma State (DC)	1,191
3	Wake Forest	1,196
4	BYU	1,198
5	New Mexico	1,202
T6	North Carolina	1,206
T6	Oral Roberts	1,206
8	Arizona State	1,213
T9	Houston	1,215
T9	USC	1,215
11	Georgia Southern	1,226
12	Fresno State	1,229
13	UCLA	1,230
14	San Jose State	1,234
15	Florida	1,236

- DC = Defending champions
- Missed cut: LSU, Temple, Florida State, Georgia, NC State, Texas, Weber State, Texas A&M, Auburn, Wichita State, San Diego State, Indiana, Connecticut
- Debut appearance
