= 2024 NCAA Division I men's golf championship =

2024 NCAA Division I Men's Golf Championship
Tournament information
- Dates: May 24–29, 2024
- Location: Carlsbad, California, U.S. 33.092267°N 117.267036°W
- Courses: Omni La Costa Resort & Spa (University of Texas)
- Organized by: NCAA

Statistics
- Field: 156 players, 30 teams

Champion
- Team: Auburn; Individual: Hiroshi Tai (Georgia Tech)
- Team: 3–2 (def. Florida State); Individual: 285 (–3)

The 2024 NCAA Division I Men's Golf Championship was a golf tournament contested May 24–29 at Omni La Costa Resort & Spa in Carlsbad, California. It was the 85th NCAA Division I Men's Golf Championship and included both team and individual championships.

== Regional qualifying tournaments ==
- Five teams qualified from each of the six regional tournaments held around the country May 13–15, 2024.
- The lowest scoring individual not affiliated with one of the qualified teams in their regional also qualified for the individual national championship.

| Regional name | Golf course | Location | Host team | Teams advancing | Individual advancing (school) |
|---|---|---|---|---|---|
| Austin Regional | The University of Texas Golf Club | Austin, TX | University of Texas | 1. Texas; 2. Tennessee; 3. Notre Dame; 4. Utah; T5. Wake Forest† | Kelvin Hernandez, UNC Greensboro |
| Baton Rouge Regional | University Club of Baton Rouge | Baton Rouge, LA | Louisiana State University | 1. Auburn; 2. Virginia; 3. Texas Tech; 4. Ohio State; 5. LSU | Ethan Evans, Duke |
| Chapel Hill Regional | UNC Finley Golf Course | Chapel Hill, NC | University of North Carolina | 1. Clemson; 2. East Tennessee State; 3. North Carolina; 4. Georgia Tech; 5. Baylor | Nick Mathews, NC State |
| Rancho Santa Fe Regional | The Farms Golf Club | Rancho Santa Fe, CA | University of San Diego | 1. Oklahoma; T2. Oklahoma State; T2. California; 4. West Virginia; 5. North Florida | Andi Xu, San Diego |
| Stanford Regional | Stanford Golf Course | Stanford, CA | Stanford University | 1. Illinois; 2. Florida State; 3. Texas A&M; T4. SMU; T4. Stanford | Ben Warian, Minnesota |
| West Lafayette Regional | Birck Boilermaker Golf Complex | West Lafayette, IN | Purdue University | 1. Vanderbilt; 2. Purdue; 3. Florida; 4. Arizona; 5. New Mexico | Cameron Huss‡, Wisconsin |

† Team advanced via playoff

‡ Player advanced via playoff

== Venue ==
This is the first time the NCAA Division I Men's Golf Championship was held at Omni La Costa Resort & Spa and the first time the tournament was hosted by the University of Texas.

== Team competition ==
=== Leaderboard ===
- Par, single-round: 288
- Par, total: 1,152
- After 54 holes, the field of 30 teams was cut to the top 15.

| Place | Team | Round 1 | Round 2 | Round 3 | Round 4 | Total | To par |
|---|---|---|---|---|---|---|---|
| 1 | Illinois | 293 | 287 | 282 | 284 | 1146 | −6 |
| 2 | Vanderbilt | 297 | 286 | 290 | 289 | 1162 | +10 |
| T3 | Virginia | 290 | 287 | 291 | 295 | 1163 | +11 |
| T3 | North Carolina | 291 | 296 | 292 | 284 | 1163 | +11 |
| 5 | Florida State | 299 | 289 | 286 | 290 | 1164 | +12 |
| 6 | Auburn | 293 | 293 | 293 | 292 | 1171 | +19 |
| 7 | Ohio State | 294 | 294 | 289 | 297 | 1174 | +22 |
| 8 | Georgia Tech | 292 | 301 | 292 | 292 | 1177 | +25 |
| 9 | Oklahoma | 301 | 302 | 286 | 289 | 1178 | +26 |
| 10 | Tennessee | 305 | 292 | 294 | 289 | 1180 | +28 |
| 11 | Florida | 295 | 302 | 287 | 297 | 1181 | +29 |
| 12 | East Tennessee State | 296 | 297 | 298 | 291 | 1182 | +30 |
| 13 | Texas | 296 | 301 | 290 | 296 | 1183 | +31 |
| 14 | Baylor | 297 | 299 | 292 | 301 | 1189 | +37 |
| 15 | Arizona | 290 | 298 | 297 | 308 | 1193 | +41 |

- Remaining teams: Wake Forest (893), Texas Tech (895), LSU (903), California (904), Texas A&M (905), Stanford (905), Clemson (906), Oklahoma State (907), Notre Dame (907), Utah (909), SMU (910), West Virginia (911), New Mexico (912), North Florida (921), Purdue (924)

=== Match play bracket ===
Quarterfinal round May 28, morning
1 | Illinois | 1
8 | Georgia Tech | 3
4 | North Carolina | 1
5 | Florida State | 3
3 | Virginia | 1
6 | Auburn | 3
2 | Vanderbilt | 1
7 | Ohio State | 3

Semifinal round May 28, afternoon
8 | Georgia Tech | 2
5 | Florida State | 3
6 | Auburn | 3
7 | Ohio State | 2

Final round May 29
5 | Florida State | 2
6 | Auburn | 3

== Individual competition ==
- Par, single-round: 72
- Par, total: 288
- The field was cut after 54 holes to the top 15 teams and the top nine individuals not on a top 15 team. These 84 players competed for the individual championship

| Place | Player | University | Score | To par |
|---|---|---|---|---|
| 1 | Hiroshi Tai | Georgia Tech | 67-77-70-71=285 | −3 |
| T2 | Luke Clanton | Florida State | 71-74-70-71=286 | −2 |
| T2 | Tyler Goecke | Illinois | 73-73-69-71=286 | −2 |
| T2 | Max Herendeen | Illinois | 73-70-71-72=286 | −2 |
| T2 | Ben James | Virginia | 73-71-69-73=286 | −2 |
| T2 | Jackson Koivun | Auburn | 71-72-72-71=286 | −2 |
| T2 | Gordon Sargent | Vanderbilt | 75-69-70-72=286 | −2 |
| T8 | Palmer Jackson | Notre Dame | 77-68-72-70=287 | −1 |
| T8 | Karl Vilips | Stanford | 69-68-76-74=287 | −1 |
| T8 | Adam Wallin | Ohio State | 68-74-69-76=287 | −1 |
