= 1943 NCAA golf championship =

1943 NCAA Golf Championship
Tournament information
- Location: Olympia Fields, Illinois, U.S.
- Course: Olympia Fields Country Club

Statistics
- Field: 7 teams

Champion
- Team: Yale; Individual: Wally Ulrich (Carleton)
- Team: 614

The 1943 NCAA Golf Championship was the fifth annual NCAA-sanctioned golf tournament to determine the individual and team national champions of men's collegiate golf in the United States. The tournament was held at the Olympia Fields Country Club in Olympia Fields, Illinois, a suburb of Chicago.

Yale claimed the team title, the Bulldogs' first national championship (at an NCAA-sponsored event). The individual title was won by Wally Ulrich from Carleton College.

Contested during the midst of World War II, only seven teams contested the 1943 tournament, a decrease of six from the previous year.

== Team results ==
Rank	Team	Score
1	Yale	614
2	Michigan	618
3	LSU (DC)	621
4	Minnesota	635
5	Northwestern	641
6	Princeton	650
7	Notre Dame	652

- Note: Top 10 only
- DC = Defending co-champions
- Note: Defending co-champion Stanford did not qualify.
