= Garrett Runion =

American golfer and coach

Current position
- Title: Head coach
- Team: LSU
- Conference: Southeastern Conference

Biographical details
- Born: Orlando, Florida, U.S.

Playing career
- 2003–2008: LSU

Coaching career (HC unless noted)
- 2010–2011: Nova Southeastern (men's asst.)
- 2011–2012: Nova Southeastern (men's)
- 2012–2018: LSU (men's asst.)
- 2018–present: LSU (women's)

Accomplishments and honors

Championships
- NCAA Division II men's national championship, Nova Southeastern (2012); NCAA Division I men's national championship, LSU (2015)

Awards
- NCAA Division II National Coach of the Year (2011–2012); Sunshine State Conference Coach of the Year (2011–2012); Eaton Golf Pride South Region Coach of the Year (2011–2012)

Garrett Runion is an American college golf coach and former player. He is currently the head coach of the women's golf team at Louisiana State University.

== Coaching career ==
=== LSU ===
Runion moved to LSU as an assistant coach for the LSU Tigers golf team for the 2012–2013 season. As an assistant coach under men's head coach Chuck Winstead, the team won the 2015 NCAA Division I Men's Golf Championship. Runion stayed in that role through the 2017–2018 season.

In 2018, Runion was named head women's golf coach for the LSU Lady Tigers golf team upon the retirement of Karen Bahnsen. The 2018–2019 season will be his first season as women's head coach.

=== Nova Southeastern ===
Runion began his coaching career as an assistant coach at Nova Southeastern during the 2010–2011 season. The next year, he was promoted to head coach at Nova Southeastern for the 2011–2012 season. During his lone season as head coach, Runion won the NCAA Division II Men's Golf Championship.

== Playing career ==
Runion is an Orlando, Florida native and member of the LSU men's golf team from 2003 to 2008. He was co-captain from 2006 to 2008 and competed in two NCAA Regionals Tournaments.
