= 1942 NCAA golf championship =

1942 NCAA Golf Championship
Tournament information
- Location: South Bend, Indiana, U.S.
- Course: South Bend Country Club

Statistics
- Field: 13 teams

Champion
- Team: Stanford (3) & LSU (2); Individual: Sandy Tatum (Stanford)
- Team: 590

The 1942 NCAA Golf Championship was the fourth annual NCAA-sanctioned golf tournament to determine the individual and team national champions of men's collegiate golf in the United States. The tournament was held at the South Bend Country Club in South Bend, Indiana, hosted by the University of Notre Dame .

LSU and Stanford, the defending champions, finished tied in the standings and shared the team championship, the second for the Tigers and the third for the Indians. The individual title was won by Sandy Tatum, also from Stanford.

== Team results ==
Rank	Team	Score
T1	LSU	590
T1	Stanford (DC)	590
3	Northwestern	597
4	Washington	604
5	Yale	605
6	Minnesota	608
7	Ohio State	610
8	Notre Dame (H)	612
9	Michigan	614
10	Navy	615

- Note: Top 10 only
- DC = Defending champions
- H = Hosts
