= NCAA Division I men's golf championship =

American collegiate golf competition

NCAA Division I Men's Golf Championship

Tournament information
- Location: 2026: Carlsbad, California
- Established: 1939
- Course: 2026: Omni La Costa Resort & Spa
- Par: 2026: 72
- Format: 72-hole stroke play 8-team match play
- Month played: May

Current champion
- Team: Auburn; Individual: Michael La Sasso (Ole Miss)

Final champion
- 2026 NCAA Division I men's golf championship

The NCAA Division I Men's Golf Championship, played in late May or early June, is the top annual competition in U.S. men's collegiate golf.

The teams that win their respective Division I conference championships are given automatic spots in the regionals. A selection committee decides which other teams play in the regionals. The top teams in each regional advance to the championship. In addition, the best player in each tournament from teams not qualified also advance to the next round as individual competitors.

Formerly, it was a stroke play team competition, but starting in 2009, the competition was changed to a stroke play/match play competition with the top eight teams after 54 holes of stroke play being seeded and concluding with an eight-team match play playoff. An award is also given for the lowest-scoring individual competitor.

Many individual winners have gone on to have successful careers on the PGA Tour, including 1961 champion Jack Nicklaus, 1967 champion Hale Irwin, 1996 champion Tiger Woods, and three-time champions Ben Crenshaw and Phil Mickelson.

As of 2024, the individual champion receives an invitation to that year's U.S. Open and the following year's Masters Tournament, in both cases on the condition that he is still an amateur.

== Results ==
Note: The NCAA was founded in 1906. The first championship sponsored by the NCAA was in 1939.

=== Pre-NCAA era, match play (1897–1938) ===
The NCAA started sponsoring the golf championship in 1939; the previous 41 championships were conferred by the National Intercollegiate Golf Association.

- Team scores, individual scores, and course pars are not kept in official NCAA records before 1939.

Year	Site	Host course	Team champion	Individual champion
1897	Ardsley-on-Hudson, NY	Ardsley Club	Yale	Louis Bayard, Jr. (Princeton)
1898	Ardsley-on-Hudson, NY	Ardsley Club	Yale (spring)	James Curtis (Harvard)
1898	Ardsley-on-Hudson, NY	Ardsley Club	Harvard (fall)	John Reid, Jr. (Yale)
1899	Garden City, NY	Garden City Golf Club	Harvard	Percy Pyne (Princeton)
1900	No tournament			
1901	Atlantic City, NJ	Atlantic City Country Club	Harvard	Halstead Lindsley (Harvard)
1902	Garden City, NY	Garden City Golf Club	Yale (spring)	Charles Hitchcock, Jr. (Yale)
1902	Morristown, NJ	Morris County Golf Club	Harvard (fall)	Chandler Egan (Harvard)
1903	Garden City, NY	Garden City Golf Club	Harvard	F. O. Reinhart (Princeton)
1904	South Hamilton, MA	Myopia Hunt Club	Harvard	A. L. White (Harvard)
1905	Garden City, NY	Garden City Golf Club	Yale	Robert Abbott (Yale)
1906	Garden City, NY	Garden City Golf Club	Yale	W. E. Clow, Jr. (Yale)
1907	Glen Cove, NY	Nassau Country Club	Yale	Ellis Knowles (Yale)
1908	West Newton, MA	Brae Burn Country Club	Yale	H. H. Wilder (Harvard)
1909	Rye, NY	Apawamis Golf Club	Yale	Albert Seckel (Princeton)
1910	West Orange, NJ	Essex County Country Club	Yale	Robert Hunter (Yale)
1911	Springfield, NJ	Baltusrol Golf Club	Yale	George Stanley (Yale)
1912	Manchester, VT	Ekwanok Country Club	Yale	F. C. Davison (Harvard)
1913	Huntingdon Valley, PA	Huntingdon Valley Country Club	Yale	Nathaniel Wheeler (Yale)
1914	Garden City, NY	Garden City Golf Club	Princeton	Edward Allis (Harvard)
1915	Greenwich, CT	Greenwich Country Club	Yale	Francis Blossom (Yale)
1916	Oakmont, PA	Oakmont Country Club	Princeton	J. W. Hubbell (Harvard)
1917	No tournament			
1918	No tournament due to World War I			
1919	Haverford Township, PA	Merion Golf Club	Columbia	A. L. Walker, Jr. (Columbia)
1920	Glen Cove, NY	Nassau Country Club	Princeton	Jess Sweetser (Yale)
1921	Greenwich, CT	Greenwich Country Club	Dartmouth	Simpson Dean (Princeton)
1922	Garden City, NY	Garden City Golf Club	Princeton	Pollack Boyd (Dartmouth)
1923	Bronxville, NY	Siwanoy Country Club	Princeton	Dexter Cummings (Yale)
1924	Greenwich, CT	Greenwich Country Club	Yale	Dexter Cummings (Yale)
1925	Montclair, VA	Montclair Country Club	Yale	Fred Lamprecht (Tulane)
1926	Haverford Township, PA	Merion Golf Club	Yale	Fred Lamprecht (Tulane)
1927	Garden City, NY	Garden City Golf Club	Princeton	Watts Gunn (Georgia Tech)
1928	Rye, NY	Apawamis Golf Club	Princeton	Maurice McCarthy (Georgetown)
1929	Deal, NJ	Hollywood Golf Club	Princeton	Tom Aycock (Yale)
1930	Oakmont, PA	Oakmont Country Club	Princeton	George Dunlap (Princeton)
1931	Olympia Fields, IL	Olympia Fields Country Club	Yale	George Dunlap (Princeton)
1932	Hot Springs, VA	The Homestead	Yale	Johnny Fischer (Michigan)
1933	Williamsville, NY	Country Club of Buffalo	Yale	Walter Emery (Oklahoma)
1934	Cleveland, TN	Cleveland Country Club	Michigan	Charlie Yates (Georgia Tech)
1935	Bethesda, MD	Congressional Country Club	Michigan	Ed White (Texas)
1936	Glenview, IL	North Shore Country Club	Yale	Charles Kocsis (Michigan)
1937	Oakmont, PA	Oakmont Country Club	Princeton	Fred Haas (LSU)
1938	Louisville, KY	Louisville Country Club	Stanford	John P. Burke (Georgetown)

=== NCAA era, match play (1939–1964) ===
Year	Site	Host course	Team championship				Individual champion
Year	Site	Host course	Champion	Score	Runner-up	Score	Individual champion
1939; Details	Des Moines, IA	Wakonda Club	Stanford	612	Northwestern; Princeton	614	Vincent D'Antoni (Tulane)
1940; Details	Manchester, VT	Ekwanok Country Club	Princeton; LSU	601			Dixon Brooke (Virginia)
1941; Details	Columbus, OH	Ohio State University Golf Club	Stanford	580	LSU	599	Earl Stewart (LSU)
1942; Details	South Bend, IN	South Bend Country Club	LSU; Stanford	590			Frank Tatum (Stanford)
1943; Details	Olympia Fields, IL	Olympia Fields Country Club	Yale	614	Michigan	618	Wally Ulrich (Carleton)
1944; Details	Toledo, OH	Inverness Club	Notre Dame	311	Minnesota	312	Louis Lick (Minnesota)
1945; Details	Columbus, OH	Ohio State University Golf Club	Ohio State	602	Northwestern	621	John Lorms (Ohio State)
1946; Details	Princeton, NJ	Springdale Golf Club	Stanford	619	Michigan	624	George Hamer (Georgia)
1947; Details	Ann Arbor, MI	University of Michigan Golf Course	LSU	606	Duke	614	Dave Barclay (Michigan)
1948; Details	Stanford, CA	Stanford University Golf Course	San Jose State	579	LSU	588	Bob Harris (San Jose State)
1949; Details	Ames, IA	Veenker Memorial Golf Course	North Texas State	590	Purdue; Texas	600	Harvie Ward (North Carolina)
1950; Details	Albuquerque, NM	Championship Golf Course at University of New Mexico	North Texas State	573	Purdue	577	Fred Wampler (Purdue)
1951; Details	Columbus, OH	Ohio State University Golf Club	North Texas State	588	Ohio State	589	Tom Nieporte (Ohio State)
1952; Details	West Lafayette, IN	Purdue University Golf Course	North Texas State	587	Michigan	593	Jim Vickers (Oklahoma)
1953; Details	Colorado Springs, CO	Broadmoor Golf Club	Stanford	578	North Carolina	580	Earl Moeller (Oklahoma A&M)
1954; Details	Houston, TX	Braeburn Country Club	SMU	572	North Texas State	573	Hillman Robbins (Memphis State)
1955; Details	Knoxville, TN	Holston Hills Country Club	LSU	574	North Texas State	583	Joe Campbell (Purdue)
1956; Details	Columbus, OH	Ohio State University Golf Club	Houston	601	North Texas State; Purdue	602	Rick Jones (Ohio State)
1957; Details	Colorado Springs, CO	Broadmoor Golf Club	Houston	602	Stanford	603	Rex Baxter (Houston)
1958; Details	Williamstown, MA	Taconic Golf Club	Houston	570	Oklahoma State	582	Phil Rodgers (Houston)
1959; Details	Eugene, OR	Eugene Country Club	Houston	561	Purdue	571	Richard Crawford (Houston)
1960; Details	Colorado Springs, CO	Broadmoor Golf Club	Houston	603	Purdue	607	Richard Crawford (Houston)
1961; Details	West Lafayette, IN	Purdue University Golf Course	Purdue	584	Arizona State	595	Jack Nicklaus (Ohio State)
1962; Details	Durham, NC	Duke Golf Club	Houston	588	Oklahoma State	598	Kermit Zarley (Houston)
1963; Details	Wichita, KS	Wichita Country Club	Oklahoma State	581	Houston	582	R. H. Sikes (Arkansas)
1964; Details	Colorado Springs, CO	Broadmoor Golf Club	Houston	580	Oklahoma State	587	Terry Small (San Jose State)

=== NCAA era, stroke play (1965–2008) ===
Year	Site	Host course	Par	Team championship				Individual champion	Score
Year	Site	Host course	Par	Champion	Score	Runner-up	Score	Individual champion	Score
1965; Details	Knoxville, TN	Holston Hills Country Club	72 (288)	Houston	577	Cal State Los Angeles	587	Marty Fleckman (Houston)	281 (−7)
1966; Details	Stanford, CA	Stanford University Golf Course	72 (288)	Houston	582	San Jose State	586	Bob Murphy (Florida)	283 (−5)
1967; Details	Shawnee on Delaware, PA	Shawnee Golf Course	72 (288)	Houston	585	Florida	588	Hale Irwin (Colorado)	283 (−5)
1968; Details	Las Cruces, NM	NMSU Golf Course	71 (284)	Florida	1,154	Houston	1,156	Grier Jones (Oklahoma State)	276 (−8)
1969; Details	Colorado Springs, CO	Broadmoor Golf Club	70 (280)	Houston	1,223	Wake Forest	1,232	Bob Clark (Cal State Los Angeles)	298 (+18)
1970; Details	Columbus, OH	OSU Golf Course	72 (288)	Houston	1,172	Wake Forest	1,182	John Mahaffey (Houston)	284 (−4)
1971; Details	Tucson, AZ	Tucson National Golf Club	72 (288)	Texas	1,144	Houston	1,151	Ben Crenshaw (Texas)	273 (−15)
1972; Details	Cape Coral, FL	Cape Coral Golf Club	72 (288)	Texas	1,146	Houston	1,159	Ben Crenshaw & Tom Kite (Texas)	279 (−9)
1973; Details	Stillwater, OK	Stillwater Country Club	70 (280)	Florida	1,149	Oklahoma State	1,159	Ben Crenshaw (Texas)	282 (+2)
1974; Details	Santee, CA	Carlton Oaks Country Club	72 (288)	Wake Forest	1,158	Florida	1,160	Curtis Strange (Wake Forest)	282 (−6)
1975; Details	Columbus, OH	OSU Golf Course	72 (288)	Wake Forest	1,156	Oklahoma State	1,189	Jay Haas (Wake Forest)	282 (−6)
1976; Details	Albuquerque, NM	UNM Championship Golf Course	72 (288)	Oklahoma State	1,166	BYU	1,173	Scott Simpson (USC)	283 (−5)
1977; Details	Hamilton, NY	Seven Oaks Golf Course	72 (288)	Houston	1,197	Oklahoma State	1,205	Scott Simpson (USC)	289 (+1)
1978; Details	Eugene, OR	Eugene Country Club	72 (288)	Oklahoma State	1,140	Georgia	1,157	David Edwards (Oklahoma State)	209 (−7)
1979; Details	Winston-Salem, NC	Bermuda Run Country Club	72 (288)	Ohio State	1,189	Oklahoma State	1,191	Gary Hallberg (Wake Forest)	287 (−1)
1980; Details	Columbus, OH	OSU Golf Course	72 (288)	Oklahoma State	1,173	BYU	1,177	Jay Don Blake (Utah State)	283 (−5)
1981; Details	Stanford, CA	Stanford University Golf Course	71 (284)	BYU	1,161	Oral Roberts	1,163	Ron Commans (USC)	283 (−1)
1982; Details	Pinehurst, NC	Pinehurst Resort	72 (288)	Houston	1,141	Oklahoma State	1,151	Billy Ray Brown (Houston)	280 (−8)
1983; Details	Fresno, CA	San Joaquin Country Club	72 (288)	Oklahoma State	1,161	Texas	1,168	Jim Carter (Arizona State)	287 (−1)
1984; Details	Houston, TX	Bear Creek Golf World	72 (288)	Houston	1,145	Oklahoma State	1,146	John Inman (North Carolina)	271 (−17)
1985; Details	Haines City, FL	Grenelefe Country Club	72 (288)	Houston	1,172	Oklahoma State	1,175	Clark Burroughs (Ohio State)	285 (−3)
1986; Details	Winston-Salem, NC	Bermuda Run Country Club	72 (288)	Wake Forest	1,156	Oklahoma State	1,160	Scott Verplank (Oklahoma State)	282 (−6)
1987; Details	Columbus, OH	OSU Golf Course	72 (288)	Oklahoma State	1,160	Wake Forest	1,176	Brian Watts (Oklahoma State)	280 (−8)
1988; Details	Thousand Oaks, CA	North Ranch Country Club	71 (284)	UCLA	1,176	UTEP; Oklahoma; Oklahoma State	1,179	E. J. Pfister (Oklahoma State)	284 (E)
1989; Details	Edmond, OK	Oak Tree Country Club	70 (280)	Oklahoma	1,139	Texas	1,179	Phil Mickelson (Arizona State)	281 (+1)
1990; Details	Tarpon Springs, FL	Innisbrook Island Course	72 (288)	Arizona State	1,155	Florida	1,157	Phil Mickelson (Arizona State)	279 (−9)
1991; Details	Pebble Beach, CA	Poppy Hills Golf Course	72 (288)	Oklahoma State	1,161	North Carolina	1,168	Warren Schutte (UNLV)	283 (−5)
1992; Details	Albuquerque, NM	UNM Championship Golf Course	72 (288)	Arizona	1,129	Arizona State	1,136	Phil Mickelson (Arizona State)	271 (−17)
1993; Details	Lexington, KY	Keene Trace Golf Club	72 (288)	Florida	1,145	Georgia Tech	1,146	Todd Demsey (Arizona State)	278 (−10)
1994; Details	McKinney, TX	Stonebridge Country Club	72 (288)	Stanford	1,129	Texas	1,133	Justin Leonard (Texas)	271 (−17)
1995; Details	Columbus, OH	OSU Golf Course	72 (288)	Oklahoma State	1,156§	Stanford	1,156	Chip Spratlin (Auburn)	283 (−5)
1996; Details	Ooltewah, TN	Honors Course	72 (288)	Arizona State	1,186	UNLV	1,189	Tiger Woods (Stanford)	285 (−3)
1997; Details	Lake Forest, IL	Conway Farms Golf Club	71 (284)	Pepperdine	1,148	Wake Forest	1,151	Charles Warren (Clemson)	279 (−5)§
1998; Details	Albuquerque, NM	UNM Championship Golf Course	72 (288)	UNLV	1,118	Clemson	1,121	James McLean (Minnesota)	271 (−17)
1999; Details	Chaska, MN	Hazeltine National Golf Club	72 (288)	Georgia	1,180	Oklahoma State	1,183	Luke Donald (Northwestern)	284 (−4)
2000; Details	Opelika, AL	Grand National	72 (288)	Oklahoma State	1,116§	Georgia Tech	1,116	Charles Howell III (Oklahoma State)	265 (−23)
2001; Details	Durham, NC	Duke Golf Club	72 (288)	Florida	1,126	Clemson	1,144	Nick Gilliam (Florida)	276 (−12)
2002; Details	Columbus, OH	OSU Golf Course	71 (284)	Minnesota	1,134	Georgia Tech	1,140	Troy Matteson (Georgia Tech)	276 (−8)
2003; Details	Stillwater, OK	Karsten Creek Golf Course	72 (288)	Clemson	1,191	Oklahoma State	1,193	Alejandro Cañizares (Arizona State)	287 (−1)
2004; Details	Hot Springs, VA	The Homestead	70 (280)	California	1,134	UCLA	1,140	Ryan Moore (UNLV)	267 (−13)
2005; Details	Owings Mills, MD	Caves Valley Golf Club	70 (280)	Georgia	1,135	Georgia Tech	1,146	James Lepp (Washington)	276 (−4)§
2006; Details	Sunriver, OR	Crosswater Club	72 (288)	Oklahoma State	1,143	Florida	1,146	Jonathan Moore (Oklahoma State)	276 (−12)§
2007; Details	Williamsburg, VA	Golden Horseshoe Golf Club	70 (280)	Stanford	1,109	Georgia	1,121	Jamie Lovemark (USC)	271 (−9)
2008; Details	West Lafayette, IN	Birck Boilermaker Golf Complex	72 (288)	UCLA	1,194	Stanford	1,195	Kevin Chappell (UCLA)	286 (−2)

=== NCAA era, stroke and match play (2009–present) ===
Year	Site	Host course	Par	Team championship			Individual champion	Score
Year	Site	Host course	Par	Champion	Score	Runner-up	Individual champion	Score
2009; Details	Toledo, OH	Inverness Club	71 (210)	Texas A&M	3–2	Arkansas	Matt Hill (NC State)	207 (−3)
2010; Details	Ooltewah, TN	Honors Course	72 (214)	Augusta State	3 1/2–1 1/2	Oklahoma State	Scott Langley (Illinois)	206 (−8)
2011; Details	Stillwater, OK	Karsten Creek Golf Course	72 (214)	Augusta State	3–2	Georgia	John Peterson (LSU)	211 (−3)
2012; Details	Pacific Palisades, CA	Riviera Country Club	71 (212)	Texas	3–2	Alabama	Thomas Pieters (Illinois)	208 (−4)
2013; Details	Atlanta, GA	Capital City Club	70 (210)	Alabama	4–1	Illinois	Max Homa (California)	201 (−9)
2014; Details	Hutchinson, KS	Prairie Dunes Country Club	70 (210)	Alabama	4–1	Oklahoma State	Cameron Wilson (Stanford)	204 (−6)§
2015; Details	Bradenton, FL	The Concession Golf Club	72 (288)	LSU	4–1	Southern California	Bryson DeChambeau (SMU)	280 (−8)
2016; Details	Eugene, OR	Eugene Country Club	70 (280)	Oregon	3–2	Texas	Aaron Wise (Oregon)	275 (−5)
2017; Details	Sugar Grove, IL	Rich Harvest Farms	72 (288)	Oklahoma	3 1/2–1 1/2	Oregon	Braden Thornberry (Mississippi)	277 (−11)
2018; Details	Stillwater, OK	Karsten Creek	72 (288)	Oklahoma State	5–0	Alabama	Broc Everett (Augusta)	281 (−7)§
2019; Details	Fayetteville, AR	Blessings Golf Club	72 (288)	Stanford	3–2	Texas	Matthew Wolff (Oklahoma State)	278 (−10)
2020	Cancelled due to the COVID-19 pandemic							
2021; Details	Scottsdale, AZ	Grayhawk Golf Club	70 (280)	Pepperdine	3–2	Oklahoma	Turk Pettit (Clemson)	273 (−7)
2022; Details	Scottsdale, AZ	Grayhawk Golf Club	70 (280)	Texas	3–2	Arizona State	Gordon Sargent (Vanderbilt)	280 (E)§
2023; Details	Scottsdale, AZ	Grayhawk Golf Club	70 (280)	Florida	3–1	Georgia Tech	Fred Biondi (Florida)	273 (−7)
2024; Details	Carlsbad, CA	Omni La Costa Resort & Spa	72 (288)	Auburn	3–2	Florida State	Hiroshi Tai (Georgia Tech)	285 (−3)
2025; Details	Carlsbad, CA	Omni La Costa Resort & Spa	72 (288)	Oklahoma State	4–1	Virginia	Michael La Sasso (Mississippi)	277 (−11)
2026; Details	Carlsbad, CA	Omni La Costa Resort & Spa	72 (288)	Auburn	4–1	UCLA	Preston Stout (Oklahoma State)	274 (−14)

- § Won via a playoff.

== Non-American winners ==
Americans had captured all of the titles from the tournament's inception, until James McLean of Australia won in 1998. Luke Donald of England won in 1999. Alejandro Cañizares of Spain won in 2003, followed by James Lepp (2005) and Matt Hill (2009), both from Canada, Thomas Pieters of Belgium in 2012, Fred Biondi of Brazil in 2023 and Hiroshi Tai of Singapore in 2024.

== Team titles ==
The Intercollegiate Golf Association (later named the National Intercollegiate Golf Association) sponsored the annual tournament and awarded titles from 1897 through 1938. In 1939, the NCAA assumed tournament sponsorship and began awarding championship titles.

Schools are listed by their current names, which do not necessarily match those used when schools won their titles.

Team	# NIGA titles	# NCAA titles	Years won
Yale	20	1	1897, 1898, 1902, 1905, 1906, 1907, 1908, 1909, 1910, 1911, 1912, 1913, 1915, 1924, 1925, 1926, 1931, 1932, 1933, 1936, 1943
Houston	0	16	1956, 1957, 1958, 1959, 1960, 1962, 1964, 1965, 1966, 1967, 1969, 1970, 1977, 1982, 1984, 1985
Oklahoma State	0	12	1963, 1976, 1978, 1980, 1983, 1987, 1991, 1995, 2000, 2006, 2018, 2025
Princeton	11	1	1914, 1916, 1919, 1920, 1922, 1923, 1927, 1928, 1929, 1930, 1937, 1940
Stanford	1	8	1938, 1939, 1941, 1942, 1946, 1953, 1994, 2007, 2019
Harvard	6	0	1898, 1899, 1901, 1902, 1903, 1904
LSU	0	5	1940, 1942, 1947, 1955, 2015
Florida	0	5	1968, 1973, 1993, 2001, 2023
North Texas	0	4	1949, 1950, 1951, 1952
Texas	0	4	1971, 1972, 2012, 2022
Wake Forest	0	3	1974, 1975, 1986
Alabama	0	2	2013, 2014
Arizona State	0	2	1990, 1996
Auburn	0	2	2024, 2026
Augusta	0	2	2010, 2011
Georgia	0	2	1999, 2005
Michigan	2	0	1934, 1935
Ohio State	0	2	1945, 1979
Oklahoma	0	2	1989, 2017
Pepperdine	0	2	1997, 2021
UCLA	0	2	1988, 2008
Arizona	0	1	1992
BYU	0	1	1981
California	0	1	2004
Clemson	0	1	2003
Dartmouth	1	0	1921
Minnesota	0	1	2002
Notre Dame	0	1	1944
Oregon	0	1	2016
Purdue	0	1	1961
San Jose State	0	1	1948
SMU	0	1	1954
Texas A&M	0	1	2009
UNLV	0	1	1998

== Multiple winners ==
=== Individual champion ===
These men have won more than one individual championship:

- 3: Ben Crenshaw, Phil Mickelson
- 2: Richard Crawford, Dexter Cummings, George Dunlap, Fred Lamprecht, Scott Simpson

=== Individual champion's school ===
These schools have produced more than one individual champion:

- 13 champions: Yale
- 10 champions: Oklahoma State
- 8 champions: Harvard, Houston
- 7 champions: Princeton
- 6 champions: Arizona State, Texas
- 5 champions: Ohio State
- 4 champions: Southern California, Georgia Tech
- 3 champions: Florida, LSU, Michigan, Stanford, Tulane, Wake Forest
- 2 champions: Clemson, Georgetown, Illinois, Minnesota, Mississippi, North Carolina, Oklahoma, Purdue, San Jose State, UNLV

== Winners of both U.S. Amateur and collegiate titles ==
These men have won both the collegiate individual championship and the U.S. Amateur. Only Jack Nicklaus (1961), Phil Mickelson (1990), Tiger Woods (1996), Ryan Moore (2004), and Bryson DeChambeau (2015) have managed the feat in the same year.

Player	U.S. Amateur	Collegiate
Bryson DeChambeau	2015	2015
George Dunlap	1933	1930, 1931
Chandler Egan	1904, 1905	1902
Johnny Fischer	1936	1932
Justin Leonard	1992	1994
Phil Mickelson	1990	1989, 1990, 1992
Ryan Moore	2004	2004
Bob Murphy	1965	1966
Jack Nicklaus	1959, 1961	1961
Hillman Robbins	1957	1954
Jess Sweetser	1922	1920
Scott Verplank	1984	1986
Harvie Ward	1955, 1956	1949
Tiger Woods	1994, 1995, 1996	1996

== See also ==
- Arnold Palmer Cup
- NAIA Men's Golf Championship
