= 1947 NCAA golf championship =

1947 NCAA Golf Championship
Tournament information
- Location: Ann Arbor, Michigan, U.S. 42.2628°N 83.7438°W
- Course: University of Michigan Golf Course

Statistics
- Field: 39 teams

Champion
- Team: LSU (3rd title); Individual: Dave Barclay (Michigan)
- Team: 606

Location map
- Location in the United States Location in Michigan

The 1947 NCAA Golf Championship was the ninth annual NCAA-sanctioned golf tournament to determine the individual and team national champions of men's collegiate golf in the United States.

This year's tournament was held at the University of Michigan Golf Course in Ann Arbor, Michigan.

LSU won the team title, eight strokes ahead of second-place Duke. Coached by T.P. Heard, this was the Tigers' third NCAA team national title.

The individual championship was won by Dave Barclay, from Michigan.

== Team results ==
Rank	Team	Score
1	LSU	606
2	Duke	614
3	Stanford (DC)	616
4	San Jose State	617
T5	Michigan	618
T5	Oklahoma A&M	618
7	Ohio State	620
8	Oklahoma	622
9	Northwestern	623
10	Miami (FL)	627

- Note: Top 10 only
- DC = Defending champions
