= 1986 NCAA Division I men's golf championship =

1986 NCAA Division I Men's Golf Championship
Tournament information
- Location: Winston-Salem, North Carolina, U.S. 36.003759°N 80.422124°W
- Course: Bermuda Run Country Club

Statistics
- Field: 31 teams

Champion
- Team: Wake Forest (3rd title); Individual: Scott Verplank, Oklahoma State
- Team: 1,156 (−4); Individual: 282

Location map
- Location in the United States Location in North Carolina

The 1986 NCAA Division I Men's Golf Championships were contested at the 48th annual NCAA-sanctioned golf tournament for determining the individual and team national champions of men's collegiate golf at the Division I level in the United States.

The tournament was held at the Bermuda Run Country Club in Winston-Salem, North Carolina, hosted by Wake Forest University.

Home team Wake Forest won the team championship, the Demon Deacons' third NCAA title and first since 1975.

Future professional Scott Verplank, from Oklahoma State, won the individual title.

== Individual results ==
=== Individual champion ===
- Scott Verplank, Oklahoma State (282)

== Team results ==
=== Finalists ===
Rank	Team	Score
1	Wake Forest	1,156
2	Oklahoma State	1,160
3	Oklahoma	1,163
4	BYU	1,167
5	Houston (DC)	1,169
6	Miami (FL)	1,170
7	Lamar	1,172
T8	Arizona State	1,174
T8	USC	1,174
10	LSU	1,175
11	Florida	1,176
12	North Carolina	1,177
T13	Fresno State	1,180
T13	Georgia Tech	1,180
T13	Ohio State	1,180
16	Arkansas	1,183
17	Texas	1,187
18	Oregon	1,192
T19	Furman	1,202
T19	TCU	1,202

=== Missed cut ===
Rank	Team	Score
21	Clemson	898
22	Auburn	900
T23	Missouri	901
T23	Texas A&M	901
25	Stanford	905
26	New Mexico	907
27	Ball State	908
28	Temple	917
29	Hartford	920
30	UTEP	924
31	Army	951

- DC = Defending champions
- Debut appearance
