= 1946 NCAA golf championship =

1946 NCAA Golf Championship
Tournament information
- Location: Princeton, New Jersey, U.S. 40.3421°N 74.6589°W
- Course: Springdale Golf Club

Statistics
- Field: 18 teams

Champion
- Team: Stanford (4th title); Individual: George Hamer (Georgia)
- Team: 619

Location map
- Location in the United States Location in New Jersey

The 1946 NCAA Golf Championship was the eighth annual NCAA-sanctioned golf tournament to determine the individual and team national champions of men's collegiate golf in the United States.

This year's tournament was held at the Springdale Golf Club in Princeton, New Jersey.

Stanford won the team title, five strokes ahead of second-place Michigan. Coached by Eddie Twiggs, this was the Stanford's fourth NCAA golf title.

The individual championship was won by George Hamer of Georgia.

With the culmination of World War II, the field expanded from five to 18 teams.

== Team results ==
Rank	Team	Score
1	Stanford	619
2	Michigan	624
3	Ohio State (DC)	625
4	Princeton	628
5	LSU	629
6	Notre Dame	631
7	Iowa	634
8	Northwestern	639
9	Minnesota	640
10	Michigan State College	644

- Note: Top 10 only
- DC = Defending champions
