= 2021 NCAA Division I men's golf championship =

2021 NCAA Division I Men's Golf Championship
Tournament information
- Dates: May 28 – June 2, 2021
- Location: Scottsdale, Arizona, U.S. 33.4942°N 111.9261°W
- Course: Grayhawk Golf Club
- Organized by: NCAA

Statistics
- Par: 70
- Length: 7,289 yards (6,665 m)
- Field: 156 players, 30 teams

Champion
- Team: Pepperdine; Individual: Turk Pettit (Clemson)
- Team: 3–2 (def. Oklahoma); Individual: 273 (−7)

Location map
- Location in Arizona

The 2021 NCAA Division I Men's Golf Championship was a golf tournament contested from May 28 – June 2 at the Grayhawk Golf Club in Scottsdale, Arizona. It was the 82nd NCAA Division I Men's Golf Championship. The team championship was won by the Pepperdine Waves who won their second national championship by defeating the Oklahoma Sooners in the championship match play round 3–2. The individual national championship was won by Turk Pettit from Clemson University.

== Regional qualifying tournaments ==
- Five teams qualified from each of the six regional tournaments held around the country May 17–19, 2021.
- The lowest scoring individual not affiliated with one of the qualified teams in their regional also qualified for the individual national championship.

Regional name	Golf course	Location	Host team	Teams advancing	Individual advancing (school)
Noblesville Regional	The Sagamore Club	Noblesville, Indiana	Ball State	1. Texas; 2. North Carolina; 3. Tennessee; 4. Louisville; 5. UAB	Cole Bradley (Purdue)
Tallahassee Regional	Seminole Legacy Golf Club	Tallahassee, Florida	Florida State	1. Florida State; 2. Georgia; 3. Georgia Tech; 4. Liberty; 5. TCU	Michael Sakane (Jacksonville)
Stillwater Regional	Karsten Creek Golf Club	Stillwater, Oklahoma	Oklahoma State	1. Oklahoma State; 2. Illinois; 3. SMU; 4. Sam Houston; 5. Little Rock	AJ Ott (Colorado State)
Kingston Springs Regional	The Golf Club of Tennessee	Kingston Springs, Tennessee	Vanderbilt	1. Vanderbilt; 2. Arkansas; 3. San Diego State; 4. NC State; 5. Clemson	James Piot (Michigan State)
Albuquerque Regional	Championship Course at UNM	Albuquerque, New Mexico	New Mexico	1. Texas Tech; 2. Arizona State; 3. Oregon State; 4. Oklahoma; 5. San Diego	Ryan Hall (South Carolina)
Cle Elum Regional	Tumble Creek Golf & Country Club	Cle Elum, Washington	Washington	1. East Tennessee State; 2. San Francisco; 3. Wake Forest; 4. Pepperdine; 5. Florida	Tristan Mandur (Utah)

== Venue ==
This was the first NCAA Division I Men's Golf Championship held at the Grayhawk Golf Club in Scottsdale, Arizona. This would have been the second year of a planned three year stretch for Grayhawk hosting both men's and women's NCAA golf championships had the 2020 championship not been cancelled due to the COVID-19 pandemic. In October, 2020, the NCAA announced that Grayhawk would host the 2023 NCAA Division I Women's and Men's Golf Championship.

== Team competition ==
=== Leaderboard ===
- Par, single-round: 280
- Par, total: 1,120
- After 54 holes, the field of 30 teams was cut to the top 15.

Place	Team	Round 1	Round 2	Round 3	Round 4	Total	To par
1	Arizona State	284	278	280	275	1117	−3
2	Oklahoma State	280	274	274	292	1120	E
3	Pepperdine	279	286	289	271	1125	+5
4	Oklahoma	280	279	282	289	1130	+10
5	Illinois	287	279	278	290	1134	+14
6	Florida State	281	294	274	287	1136	+16
7	Vanderbilt	293	280	280	291	1144	+24
8	North Carolina	288	278	287	292	1145	+25
T9	Louisville	289	288	287	288	1152	+32
T9	Sam Houston	278	292	288	294	1152	+32
T11	Arkansas	287	293	288	285	1153	+33
T11	Texas Tech	276	304	288	285	1153	+33
T13	Clemson	287	284	285	300	1156	+36
T13	Wake Forest	287	284	282	303	1156	+36
15	Georgia Tech	289	288	295	297	1169	+49

- Georgia Tech (+1) beat TCU (+4) in a one-hole playoff to advance to the final round of stroke play.
- Remaining teams: TCU (872), Tennessee (873), SMU (873), Georgia (873), NC State (876), Liberty (879), Florida (880), Oregon State (882), UAB (885), Texas (886), San Diego State (886), San Diego (887), East Tennessee State (893), San Francisco (896), Little Rock (905)

=== Match play bracket ===
Quarterfinal round June 1
1	Arizona State	3.5
8	North Carolina	1.5
4	Oklahoma	3
5	Illinois	2
3	Pepperdine	3.5
6	Florida State	1.5
2	Oklahoma State	4
7	Vanderbilt	1

Semifinal round June 1
1	Arizona State	2
4	Oklahoma	3
3	Pepperdine	4
2	Oklahoma State	1

Final round June 2
4	Oklahoma	2
3	Pepperdine	3

== Individual competition ==
- Par, single-round: 70
- Par, total: 280
- The field was cut after 54 holes to the top 15 teams and the top nine individuals not on a top 15 team. These 84 players competed for the individual championship

Place	Player	University	Score	To par
1	Turk Pettit	Clemson	68-67-68-70=273	−7
2	Bo Jin	Oklahoma State	67-65-69-73=274	−6
3	Ryggs Johnston	Arizona State	72-63-71-69=275	−5
4	Michael Feagles	Illinois	72-67-67-70=276	−4
5	John Pak	Florida State	68-72-68-69=277	−3
T6	Jonathan Brightwell	Oklahoma	68-69-69-72=278	−2
T6	Quade Cummins	Oklahoma	69-68-68-73=278	−2
T8	Ludvig Åberg	Texas Tech	68-76-69-66=279	−1
T8	Cameron Sisk	Arizona State	70-73-67-69=279	−1
T8	Eugenio Lopez-Chacarra	Oklahoma State	70-69-68-72=279	−1
T8	William Holcomb	Sam Houston	67-71-69-72=279	−1

- Spencer Tibbits (E, Oregon State) beat Benjamin Shipp (+1, NC State) in a one-hole playoff for the final individual spot to advance to the final round of stroke play.
