= Runion =

Runion is a surname. Notable people with the surname include:

- Chris Runion (born 1958), American politician
- Garrett Runion (fl. 2003), American collegiate golf coach
