= Chuck Winstead =

American golfer and coach

Current position
- Title: Head coach
- Team: LSU
- Conference: Southeastern Conference

Biographical details
- Born: Ruston, Louisiana, U.S.

Playing career
- 1989–1991: LSU

Coaching career (HC unless noted)
- 2006–Present: LSU

Accomplishments and honors

Championships
- 2015 Men's National Champion

Awards
- National Coach of the Year (Golfweek): 2015; SEC Coach of the Year (Golfweek): 2015

Chuck Winstead is an American college golf coach and former player. He is currently the head coach of the men's golf team at Louisiana State University.

== Coaching career ==
Winstead has been the head coach of the LSU since 2006. During his time leading the Tigers, Winstead has produced seven All-American selections, six All-SEC selections, four SEC All-Freshman Team selections. LSU Men's Golf team earned NCAA Regional berths from 2008-2015 and competed at the NCAA Division I Men's Golf Championships in 2010, 2011, 2013 and 2015.

In 2013, Winstead coached John Peterson to the NCAA Division I Men's Golf Championship. Peterson claimed LSU's first national championship in 70 years with his title-clinching play at Karsten Creek Golf Club in Stillwater, Oklahoma. He joined former Tiger champions Fred Haas, Jr. (1937) and Earl Stewart (1941) as national champions.

In 2015, Winstead coached the Tigers to the NCAA Division I Men's Golf Championship and SEC Championship.

== Club Professional ==
Winstead has been associated with the University Club of Baton Rouge since 2000, where he has served as the Director of Instruction and owner of the Chuck Winstead Golf Academy. He also provided oversight on the multimillion-dollar renovation project to the University Club of Baton Rouge and LSU's Bilyeu Golf Practice Facility in 2010.

Prior to The University Club and LSU, Winstead was Director of Instruction at English Turn Golf & Country Club in New Orleans, Louisiana from 1998-2000. He was also head instructor for the Bob Toski Learning Center in Sunrise, Florida, from 1993-95. In the mid-to-late 1990s, Winstead served as Director of Instruction for Golden Beach Golf at Jack Nicklaus' Golden Bear Golf, Inc. He was part of the senior management team developing, managing and initiating the launch of Jack Nicklaus Golf Academies worldwide.

His instructional skills have been recognized by many of the leading golf publications nationally during his career, including the honor of being named a Golf Magazine Top 100 Instructor in America since 2005.

== Playing career ==
Winstead is a Ruston, Louisiana native and member of the LSU men's golf team from 1989-91. Winstead's career as a professional golfer was as a member of the South American tour.
