= Seminole Legacy Golf Club =

Golf course in Tallahassee, Florida, US

Coordinates: 30.4176°N 84.3231°W

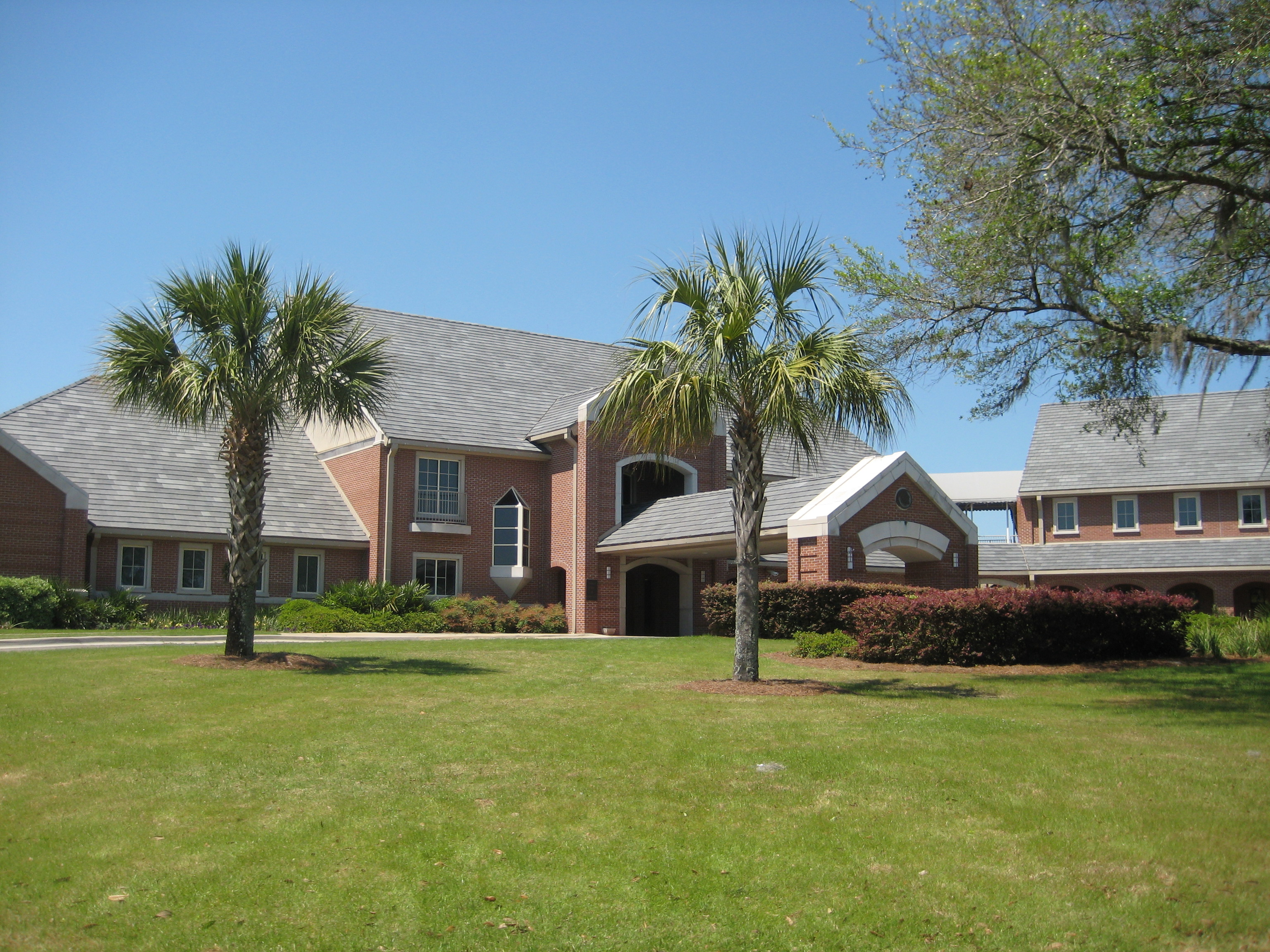
- Interactive map of Seminole Legacy Golf Club

Club information
- Location: Tallahassee, Florida
- Established: 1962
- Type: Public / University
- Owner: Florida State University
- Operator: Troon
- Tota holes: 18
- Website: www.seminolelegacygolfclub.com

Original Design
- Designed by: Bill Amick

Redesign 2020
- Designed by: Nicklaus Design Company
- Par: 72
- Length: 7,240
- Course rating: 74.3

The Seminole Legacy Golf Club, known in the past as the Don Veller Seminole Golf Course and Club is located in Tallahassee, Florida and is the home of the Florida State Seminoles men's golf and Florida State Seminoles women's golf teams. It was constructed in 1962 by the architect Bill Amick. Bob Walker renovated the course to a 7,147-yard (6,535 m) par 73 course. In 2020 the course opened after a 10 million dollar renovation designed by famed Nicklaus Design Company. Course was renovated into a 7,240 yard par 72 course.

The Seminole Legacy Golf Club on the Florida State University campus in Tallahassee and the Don Middleton Golf Complex was home to the school's Professional Golf Management program. The two-story brick building has two wings that houses offices, classrooms, clubhouse, pro shop and the Burr Family Renegade Grill.

In 2007 a new 21,000-square-foot (2,000 m^{2}) chipping green was added in the southeast corner near the 29 driving range boxes. A 10-acre (40,000 m^{2}) practice facility is used by the FSU golf team. At its height, the par-73 old course was open to the public, enjoyed a membership of 800 and hosted approximately 42,000 rounds annually.

== 2018-2020 redesign ==
In September 2018, Florida State University began an $8 million renovation project of the club, including a course redesign by Nicklaus Design. Only the 18th hole was kept from the original course routing, as well as some of the corridors. The course opened in March 2020, and became the first Jack Nicklaus Legacy Course in North America. (Note: Jack Nicklaus Legacy Courses are those designed by Jack Nicklaus and his son Jack II) Sports Illustrated described the club as "the perfect mix of neo-classical, Golden Age architecture, and the accuracy based parkland-style golf that Jack most notably favors." The combination of long yardage with Tallahassee's rolling hilly terrain, large trees, and greens with no flat surfaces, were noted by critics as appropriate for challenging modern collegiate golfers capable of driving 330 yards.

Initially the club was managed by ClubCorp; however Florida State opted not to extend their initial contract and in 2021 hired Troon, the world's largest golf management company, to take over duties. In 2021, the club's membership had declined from its Walker-era heights, with a membership of 448, no longer open to the public (though still accessible for FSU students) and hosted approximately 20,000 rounds annually. However that year, it hosted the NCAA Men's Regional Championship.

The course was ranked #15 in Golf.com’s Top 30 Golf Courses in Florida for 2022–2023. Golf.com noted that “The renovation of the Club has effectively repositioned Seminole Legacy as one of the top collegiate golf clubs in the U.S.”

Since 2024, the club has been the site of the American Junior Golf Association championship tournament.

== Scorecard ==
#	1	2	3	4	5	6	7	8	9	Out
Par	4	4	3	5	3	5	4	4	4	36
Yds	440	370	200	515	185	575	350	320	485	3,440

#	10	11	12	13	14	15	16	17	18	In
Par	4	5	4	3	5	3	4	4	4	36
Yds	470	535	435	220	600	150	480	420	490	3,800

== See also ==
- Florida State Seminoles
- Golf
- Golf course
