= 2025 NCAA Division I men's golf championship =

2025 NCAA Division I Men's Golf Championship
Tournament information
- Dates: May 23–28, 2025
- Location: Carlsbad, California, U.S. 33.092267°N 117.267036°W
- Courses: Omni La Costa Resort & Spa (University of Texas)
- Organized by: NCAA

Statistics
- Field: 156 players, 30 teams

Champion
- Team: Oklahoma State; Individual: Michael La Sasso (Ole Miss)
- Team: 4–1 (def. Virginia); Individual: 277 (−11)

The 2025 NCAA Division I Men's Golf Championship was a golf tournament that was contested May 23–28 at Omni La Costa Resort & Spa in Carlsbad, California. It was the 86th NCAA Division I Men's Golf Championship and included both team and individual championships.

== Regional qualifying tournaments ==
- Five teams qualified from each of the six regional tournaments held around the country May 12–14, 2025.
- The lowest scoring individual not affiliated with one of the qualified teams in their regional also qualified for the individual national championship.

Regional name	Golf course	Location	Host team	Teams advancing	Individual advancing (school)
Amherst Regional	Poplar Grove Golf Course	Amherst, Virginia	Liberty University	1. Oklahoma; 2. Vanderbilt; 3. Tennessee; 4. Wake Forest; 5. Pepperdine	Sakke Siltala, Texas State
Urbana Regional	Atkins Golf Club	Urbana, Illinois	University of Illinois	T1. Illinois; T1. Oklahoma State; 3. UNLV; 4. Troy; 5. Texas Tech	Hunter Thomson, Michigan
Auburn Regional	Auburn University Club	Auburn, Alabama	Auburn University	1. Auburn; 2. Texas A&M; 3. UCLA; 4. Purdue; 5. Georgia Tech	Claes Borregaard, Kennesaw State
Bremerton Regional	Gold Mountain Golf Club	Bremerton, Washington	University of Washington	1. Florida; 2. Arizona State; 3. Colorado; 4. South Florida; 5. South Carolina	Braxton Watts, Utah
Reno Regional	Montreux Golf and Country Club	Reno, Nevada	University of Nevada Reno	1. BYU; 2. Virginia; 3. Texas; 4. San Diego; 5. California	Dane Huddleston, Utah Valley
Tallahassee Regional	Seminole Legacy Golf Club	Tallahassee, Florida	Florida State University	1. Florida State; 2. Ole Miss; 3. New Mexico; 4. Georgia; 5. Augusta	Jacob Modleski, Notre Dame

== Venue ==
This is the second time the NCAA Division I Men's Golf Championship was held at Omni La Costa Resort & Spa and hosted by the University of Texas.

== Team competition ==
=== Leaderboard ===
- Par, single-round: 288
- Par, total: 1,152
- After 54 holes, the field of 30 teams was cut to the top 15. Wake Forest defeated Georgia Tech in a playoff for the 15th advancing place.

Place	Team	Round 1	Round 2	Round 3	Round 4	Total	To par
1	Arizona State	286	277	295	280	1138	−14
2	Auburn	286	282	286	286	1140	−12
3	Florida	285	286	292	280	1143	−9
4	Oklahoma State	293	285	291	282	1151	−1
5	Oklahoma	280	286	295	291	1152	E
6	Texas	285	291	293	288	1157	+5
7	Virginia	299	287	291	284	1161	+9
8	Ole Miss	293	287	296	287	1163	+11
9	Florida State	285	290	298	291	1164	+12
10	Texas Tech	292	298	286	290	1166	+14
11	Texas A&M	297	291	288	292	1168	+16
12	Pepperdine	293	294	292	290	1169	+17
T13	Vanderbilt	294	294	292	290	1170	+18
T13	BYU	289	300	289	292	1170	+18
15	Wake Forest	296	292	293	302	1183	+31

- Remaining teams: Georgia Tech (881), California (884), Illinois (887), South Carolina (890), UCLA (894), Tennessee (894), Georgia (895), UNLV (896), Colorado (896), South Florida (897), New Mexico (900), Purdue (901), Augusta (903), Troy (906), San Diego (919)

=== Match play bracket ===
Quarterfinal round May 27, morning
1	Arizona State	2
8	Ole Miss	3
4	Oklahoma State	3.5
5	Oklahoma	1.5
3	Florida	3
6	Texas	2
2	Auburn	2
7	Virginia	3

Semifinal round May 27, afternoon
8	Ole Miss	2
4	Oklahoma State	3
3	Florida	1
7	Virginia	4

Final round May 28
4	Oklahoma State	4
7	Virginia	1

== Individual competition ==
- Par, single-round: 72
- Par, total: 288
- The field was cut after 54 holes to the top 15 teams and the top nine individuals not on a top 15 team. These 84 players competed for the individual championship

Place	Player	University	Score	To par
1	Michael La Sasso	Ole Miss	68-67-70-72=277	−11
2	Phichaksn Maichon	Texas A&M	66-73-68-72=279	−9
3	Preston Stout	Oklahoma State	71-70-70-70=281	−7
T4	José Luis Ballester	Arizona State	70-70-74-68=282	−6
T4	Jackson Koivun	Auburn	71-70-71-70=282	−6
6	Pablo Ereño	UCLA	74-71-69-69=283	−5
7	Paul Chang	Virginia	75-71-69-69=284	−4
7	Connor Williams	Arizona State	68-67-75-74=284	−4
9	Supapon Amornchaichan	Purdue	73-69-72-71=285	−3
9	Mahanth Chirravuri	Pepperdine	71-73-70-71=285	−3
9	Matthew Kress	Florida	75-71-69-70=285	−3
9	Preston Summerhays	Arizona State	74-70-71-68=285	−3
