= Dave Barclay =

American amateur golfer (1920–2009)

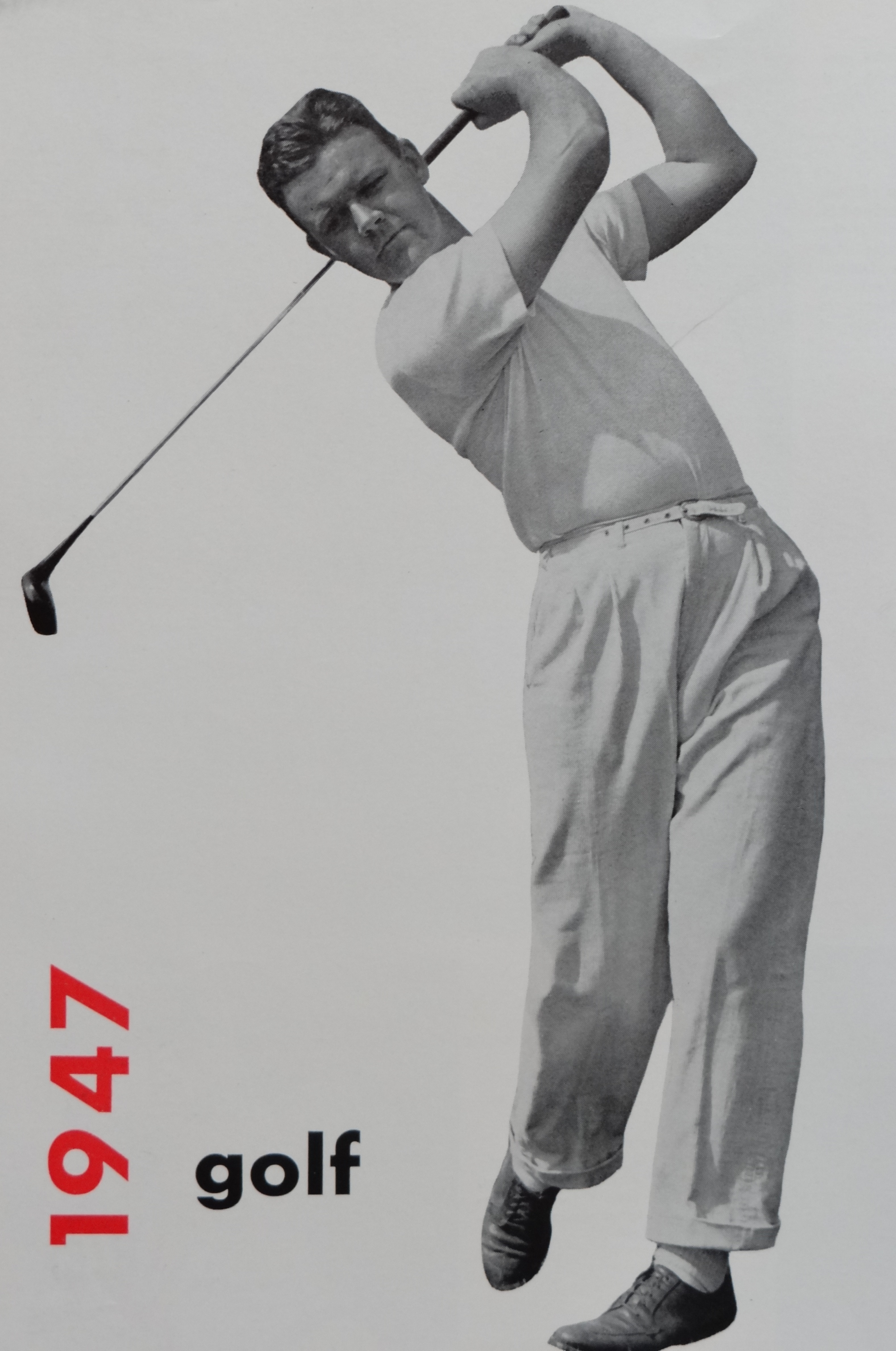
- Barclay from the 1948 Michiganensian

Personal information
- Full name: David Barclay
- Nationality: United States
- Born: July 5, 1920 Rockford, Illinois, U.S.
- Died: October 28, 2009 (aged 89) Mayfield, Kentucky, U.S.

Career
- Sport: Golf
- College: University of Michigan
- Status: Amateur

David Barclay (July 5, 1920 – October 28, 2009) was an American amateur golfer in the 1940s. He played for the Michigan Wolverines golf team and won the 1947 NCAA golf championship held in Ann Arbor, Michigan.

== Early life ==
Barclay was a native of Rockford, Illinois. In 1938, he helped lead Rockford High School's golf team to a tie for third place in Illinois. In 1941, he enlisted in the United States Army Air Forces and flew 54 combat missions as a bomber navigator during World War II.

== Amateur career ==
After being discharged from the military, Barclay enrolled at the University of Michigan. While attending Michigan, he played on the Michigan Wolverines golf team. He finished tied for eighth place in the 1946 NCAA tournament. The following year, the NCAA's intercollegiate golf tournament was held at the University of Michigan Golf Course in Ann Arbor, Michigan. He defeated LSU's Jack Coyle in the championship match to become the 1947 NCAA golf champion. Barclay was the third Michigan Wolverines golfer to win the NCAA championship, following Johnny Fischer (1932) and Chuck Kocsis (1936). No Michigan golfer has achieved the feat since then.

== Later years ==
Barclay moved to Mayfield, Kentucky, in 1951. He lived there until his death in 2009. For more than 30 years, he was an employee of Union Carbide at the Paducah Gaseous Diffusion Plant, producing enriched uranium to fuel nuclear reactors and for use in nuclear weapons. Barclay became the head of the finance and materials division. He retired in 1983 and died in 2009.

== Awards and honors ==
Barclay was inducted into the University of Michigan Athletic Hall of Honor in 1987.
