= 1977 NCAA Division I golf championship =

1977 NCAA Division I Golf Championship
Tournament information
- Location: Hamilton, New York, U.S. 42.829484°N 75.534557°W
- Course: Seven Oaks Golf Course

Statistics
- Field: 20 teams

Champion
- Team: Houston (13th title); Individual: Scott Simpson, USC (2nd title)

Location map
- Location in the United States Location in New York

The 1977 NCAA Division I Golf Championship was the 39th annual NCAA-sanctioned golf tournament to determine the individual and team national champions of men's collegiate golf at the University Division level in the United States.

The tournament was held at the Seven Oaks Golf Course in Hamilton, New York.

Houston won the team championship, the Cougars' 13th NCAA title.

Defending NCAA champion and future U.S. Open champion Scott Simpson, USC, won the individual title, his second.

== Individual results ==
=== Individual champion ===
- Scott Simpson, USC

== Team results ==
Rank	Team	Score
1	Houston	1,197
2	Oklahoma State (DC)	1,205
T3	Arizona State	1,211
T3	Georgia	1,211
5	USC	1,212
6	BYU	1,219
7	Oregon	1,228
8	Florida	1,230
9	Ohio State	1,232
10	Wake Forest	1,233
11	Texas A&M	1,234
12	North Carolina	1,240
13	San Jose State	1,241
14	Georgia Southern	1,247
T15	San Diego State	1,248
T15	Stanford	1,248
17	SMU	1,252
18	Furman	1,253
T19	Fresno State	1,259
T19	Indiana	1,259

- DC = Defending champions
- Debut appearance
