= 2023 NCAA Division I men's golf championship =

2023 NCAA Division I Men's Golf Championship
Tournament information
- Dates: May 26–31, 2023
- Location: Scottsdale, Arizona, U.S. 33.4942°N 111.9261°W
- Course: Grayhawk Golf Club
- Organized by: NCAA

Statistics
- Par: 70
- Length: 7,289 yards (6,665 m)
- Field: 156 players, 30 teams

Champion
- Team: Florida; Individual: Fred Biondi (Florida)
- Team: 3–1 (def. Georgia Tech); Individual: 273 (–6)
- Location in Arizona

The 2023 NCAA Division I Men's Golf Championship was a golf tournament contested from May 26–31 at the Grayhawk Golf Club in Scottsdale, Arizona. It was the 84th NCAA Division I Men's Golf Championship. It included both team and individual championships.

== Regional qualifying tournaments ==
- Five teams qualified from each of the six regional tournaments held around the country May 15–17, 2023.
- The lowest scoring individual not affiliated with one of the qualified teams in their regional also qualified for the individual national championship.

Regional name	Golf course	Location	Host team	Teams advancing	Individual advancing (school)
Auburn Regional	Auburn University Club	Auburn, Alabama	Auburn University	1. Auburn; 2. Vanderbilt; 3. Chattanooga; 4. Ohio State; 5. Colorado State	Drew Salyers, Indiana
Bath Regional	Eagle Eye Golf Club	East Lansing, Michigan	Michigan State University	1. Georgia; 2. Illinois; 3. Oregon; 4. Florida; 5. Texas	Luke O'Neill, Kansas State
Las Vegas Regional	Bear's Best Las Vegas	Las Vegas, Nevada	University of Nevada, Las Vegas	1. Arizona State; 2. Stanford; 3. Virginia; 4. San Francisco; 5. East Tennessee State	Jonas Baumgartner, Oklahoma State
Morgan Hill Regional	The Institute Golf Club	Morgan Hill, California	San Jose State University	1. Mississippi State; 2. BYU; 3. Florida State; 4. Baylor; 5. Pepperdine	Riley Lewis, Loyola Marymount
Norman Regional	Jimmie Austin OU Golf Club	Norman, Oklahoma	University of Oklahoma	1. Alabama; 2. Oklahoma; 3. Colorado; 4. Texas Tech; 5. Duke	Will King, Kansas
Salem Regional	The Cliffs at Keowee Falls	Salem, South Carolina	Clemson University	1. Georgia Tech; 2. Arkansas; 3. North Carolina; 4. New Mexico; 5. Texas A&M	Sam Lape, Furman

== Venue ==
This was the third consecutive NCAA Division I Men's Golf Championship held at the Grayhawk Golf Club in Scottsdale, Arizona. This would have been the third year and final year of a planned three year stretch for Grayhawk hosting both men's and women's NCAA golf championships had the 2020 championship not been cancelled due to the COVID-19 pandemic. In October 2020, the NCAA announced that Grayhawk would host the 2023 NCAA Division I Women's and Men's Golf Championship.

== Team competition ==
=== Leaderboard ===
- Par, single-round: 280
- Par, total: 1,120
- After 54 holes, the field of 30 teams was cut to the top 15.

Place	Team	Round 1	Round 2	Round 3	Round 4	Total	To par
1	North Carolina	282	284	275	273	1114	−6
T2	Florida	283	278	278	279	1118	−2
T2	Illinois	285	273	276	284	1118	−2
4	Pepperdine	281	287	269	283	1120	E
T5	Georgia Tech	280	286	276	284	1126	+6
T5	Florida State	284	287	282	273	1126	+6
7	Virginia	290	281	283	277	1131	+11
8	Arizona State†	291	281	279	281	1132	+12
9	Stanford	290	286	274	282	1132	+12
10	Auburn	288	286	282	282	1138	+18
T11	Vanderbilt	282	288	283	288	1141	+21
T11	Alabama	290	282	289	280	1141	+21
13	Texas A&M	289	285	283	287	1144	+24
14	Georgia	285	291	288	285	1149	+29
15	Ohio State	287	295	284	294	1160	+40

- † Arizona State (–1) beat Stanford (E) in a two-hole playoff to advance to match play.
- Ohio State (E) beat Texas Tech (+1) in a one-hole playoff to advance to the final round of stroke play.
- Remaining teams: Texas Tech (866), Oklahoma (867), Arkansas (870), Texas (872), San Francisco (873), Colorado (874), Duke (878), Chattanooga (879), BYU (879), New Mexico (880), Mississippi State (880), Oregon (882), Colorado State (885), East Tennessee State (886), Baylor (893)

=== Match play bracket ===
Quarterfinal round May 30
1	North Carolina	3
8	Arizona State	1
4	Pepperdine	2
5	Georgia Tech	3
3	Illinois	2
6	Florida State	3
2	Florida	3
7	Virginia	2

Semifinal round May 30
1	North Carolina	2
5	Georgia Tech	3
6	Florida State	2
2	Florida	3

Final round May 31
5	Georgia Tech	1
2	Florida	3

== Individual competition ==
- Par, single-round: 70
- Par, total: 280
- The field was cut after 54 holes to the top 15 teams and the top nine individuals not on a top 15 team. These 84 players competed for the individual championship

Place	Player	University	Score	To par
1	Fred Biondi	Florida	69-68-69-67=273	−7
T2	Jackson Buchanan	Illinois	71-68-68-67=274	−6
T2	Ross Steelman	Georgia Tech	64-69-68-73=274	−6
T4	Barclay Brown	Stanford	68-71-67-69=275	−5
T4	Dylan Menante	North Carolina	68-70-67-70=275	−5
6	Ben James	Virginia	71-68-69-68=276	−4
T7	Sam Choi	Pepperdine	70-72-67-70=279	−1
T7	Adrien Dumont de Chassart	Illinois	68-68-70-73=279	−1
T7	Tommy Kuhl	Illinois	72-69-67-71=279	−1
T7	Brett Roberts	Florida State	69-73-70-67=279	−1
