= 2010 NCAA Division I men's golf championship =

Coordinates: 35.0867°N 85.0446°W

2010 NCAA Division I Men's Golf Championship
Tournament information
- Dates: June 1–6, 2010
- Location: Ooltewah, Tennessee, U.S.
- Course(s): Honors Course

Statistics
- Par: 72
- Field: 156 players, 30 teams

Champion
- Team: Augusta State; Individual: Scott Langley, Illinois
- Team: 3 1/2–1 1/2 (def. Oklahoma State); Individual: 216 (−10)

The 2010 NCAA Division I Men's Golf Championship was a golf tournament contested from June 1–6, 2010 at the Honors Course in Ooltewah, Tennessee. It was the 72nd NCAA Division I Men's Golf Championship. The team championship was won by the Augusta State Jaguars, their first, who defeated the Oklahoma State Cowboys in the championship match play round 3 1/2 to 2 1/2. The individual national championship was won by Scott Langley from the University of Illinois.

== Venue ==
This was the second NCAA Division I Men's Golf Championship held at the Honors Course in Ooltewah, Tennessee just to the north of Chattanooga; the course previously hosted in 1996.

== Team competition ==
=== Leaderboard ===
- Par, single-round: 288
- Par, total: 864

The top eight teams advanced to the match play portion of the tournament.

Place	Team	Round 1	Round 2	Round 3	Total (To par)
1	Oklahoma State	283	284	283	850 (−14)
2	Florida State	283	279	292	854 (−10)
3	Georgia Tech	290	288	283	858 (−6)
4	Washington	289	288	283	860 (−4)
5	Oregon	284	294	283	861 (−3)
6	Augusta State	287	288	288	863 (−1)
7	Texas Tech	302	285	280	867 (+3)
8	Stanford	292	288	288	868 (+4)
T9	San Diego	294	282	292	868 (+4)
T9	Arizona State	286	292	290	868 (+4)

- Stanford (−3) won the eighth place playoff tie-breaker with San Diego (−2) and Arizona State (−1).
- Rest of the Field: Florida (869), Virginia (869), Texas A&M (871), North Florida (872), USC (874), Clemson (875), Oregon State (875), UCLA (875), Illinois (876), Kent State (877), UNLV (879), Texas (879), California (880), LSU (883), Baylor (884), Tennessee (884), Duke (889), TCU (889), Penn State (898), Georgia Southern (905)

=== Match play bracket ===
Quarterfinal round June 4
1	Oklahoma State	4
8	Stanford	1
4	Washington	2
5	Oregon	3
3	Georgia Tech	2
6	Augusta State	3
2	Florida State	4
7	Texas Tech	1

Semifinal round June 5
1	Oklahoma State	3.5
5	Oregon	1.5
6	Augusta State	4
2	Florida State	1

Final round June 6
1	Oklahoma State	1.5
6	Augusta State	3.5

==== Championship match play ====
Match	Oklahoma State golfer	Augusta State golfer	Score	Tally
5	Sean Einhaus	Carter Newman	2 & 1	OSU 1–0
4	Trent Whitekiller	Taylor Floyd	Halved	OSU 1 1/2–1/2
3	Kevin Tway	Mitch Krywulycz	19 holes	Tied 1 1/2–1 1/2
2	Peter Uihlein	Patrick Reed	2 & 4	ASU 2 1/2–1 1/2
1	Morgan Hoffmann	Henrik Norlander	4 & 5	ASU 3 1/2–1 1/2
