= Greenwich Country Club =

Private country club in Greenwich, Connecticut

Coordinates: 41.0568°N 73.6112°W

- Formation: 1892
- Location: Greenwich, Connecticut, United States

Greenwich Country Club is a country club in Greenwich, Connecticut, United States that was founded in 1892. A wing of the clubhouse was rebuilt in brick following a fire in 1928.

== See also ==
- Golf in the United States
- List of golf courses in the United States § Connecticut
- Julian Wheeler Curtiss
