= 1945 NCAA golf championship =

1945 NCAA Golf Championship
Tournament information
- Location: Columbus, Ohio, U.S.
- Course: Ohio State University Golf Club

Statistics
- Field: 5 teams

Champion
- Team: Ohio State (1st); Individual: John Lorms (Ohio State)
- Team: 602

The 1945 NCAA Golf Championship was the seventh annual NCAA-sanctioned golf tournament to determine the individual and team national champions of men's collegiate golf in the United States.

The tournament was held at the Ohio State University Golf Club in Columbus, Ohio.

Host Ohio State won the team title, finishing 19 strokes ahead of second-place finishers Michigan and Northwestern. This was the Buckeyes' first NCAA golf title.

The individual championship was won by John Lorms, also from Ohio State.

Contested during the midst of World War II, only five teams contested the tournament.

== Team results ==
Rank	Team	Score
1	Ohio State	602
T2	Michigan	621
T2	Northwestern	621
4	Notre Dame (DC)	633
5	Minnesota	638

- DC = Defending champions
