= University Club of Baton Rouge =

Golf course in Baton Rouge, Louisiana

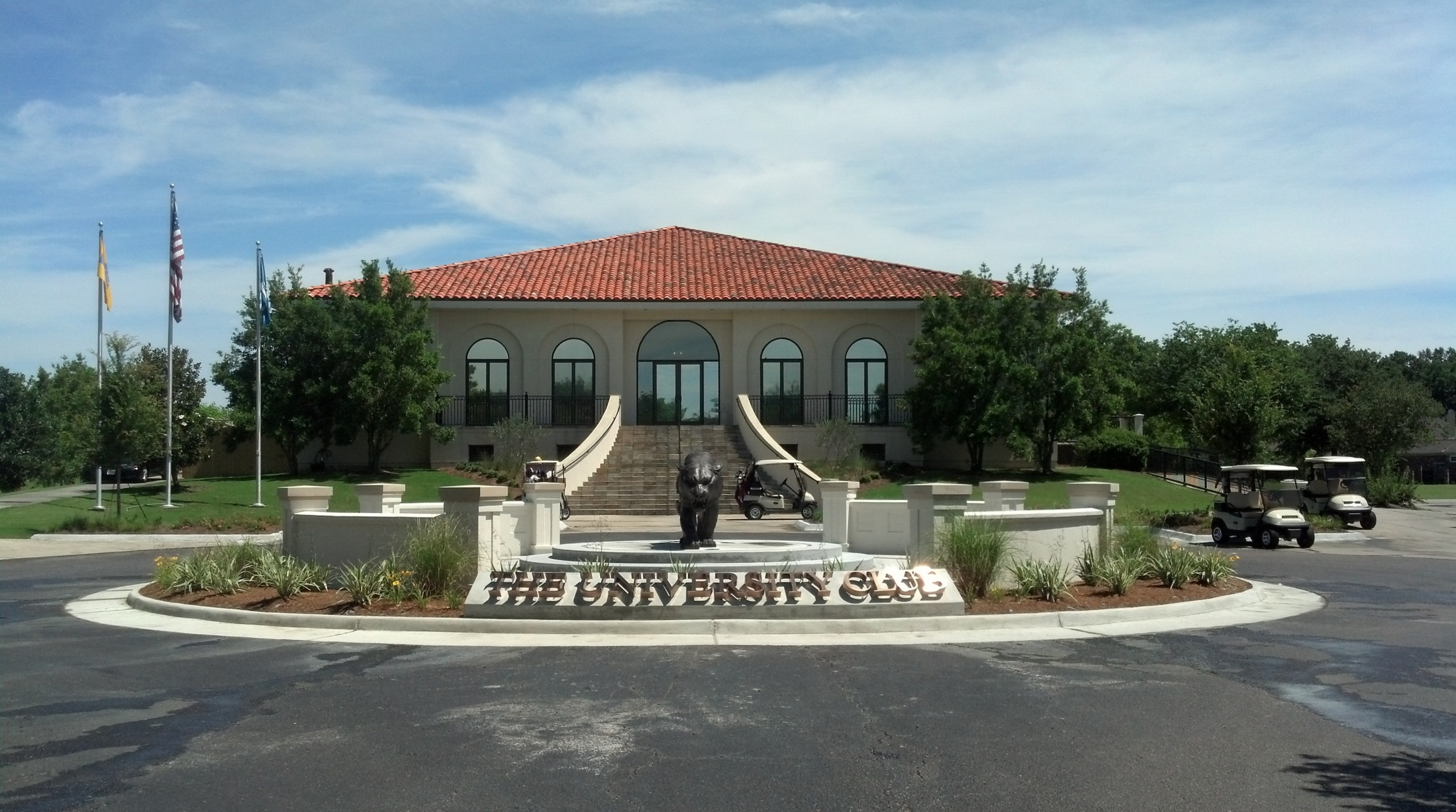
- Interactive map of University Club of Baton Rouge
- 30°19′11.5″N 91°7′5.5″W

Club information
- Location: Baton Rouge, Louisiana, U.S.
- Established: October 22, 1998; 27 years ago
- Type: Private
- Owner: Private corporation
- Operator: Private corporation
- Tota holes: 18
- Tournaments: 2013 NCAA Division I Men's Golf Championship Regional, 2015 L’Auberge Pro-Am of Baton Rouge
- Website: University Club of Baton Rouge
- Designed by: Jim Lipe and David Toms
- Par: 72
- Length: 7,700 yds

The University Club of Baton Rouge in Baton Rouge, Louisiana, is the home of the LSU Tigers and LSU Lady Tigers golf teams and serves as the host site for all of LSU's tournaments.

The University Club is a private facility that was built to be the permanent home of LSU Golf. It has a 7,700 yard, Par 72 Championship-Caliber, 300-acre course.

The University Club was developed on land donated to the Tiger Athletic Foundation (TAF) and subsequently leased to the University Club. The Tiger Athletic Foundation is a private, non-profit corporation which serves as the fund-raising and development arm of the LSU Athletics Department. Membership in the club is offered to members of the Tiger Athletic Foundation and then extended to the general public, who first must become members of the Tiger Athletic Foundation. The club is owned and managed by a corporation made up of LSU supporters. The Tiger Athletic Foundation also supports the club.

== Course history ==
The course was originally designed by Jim Lipe and opened in 1998. The course was later redesigned by former LSU All-American golfer David Toms and the original designer, Jim Lipe in 2010. Its redesign took advantage of the natural topography keeping in mind the Louisiana wetlands that surround the golf course.

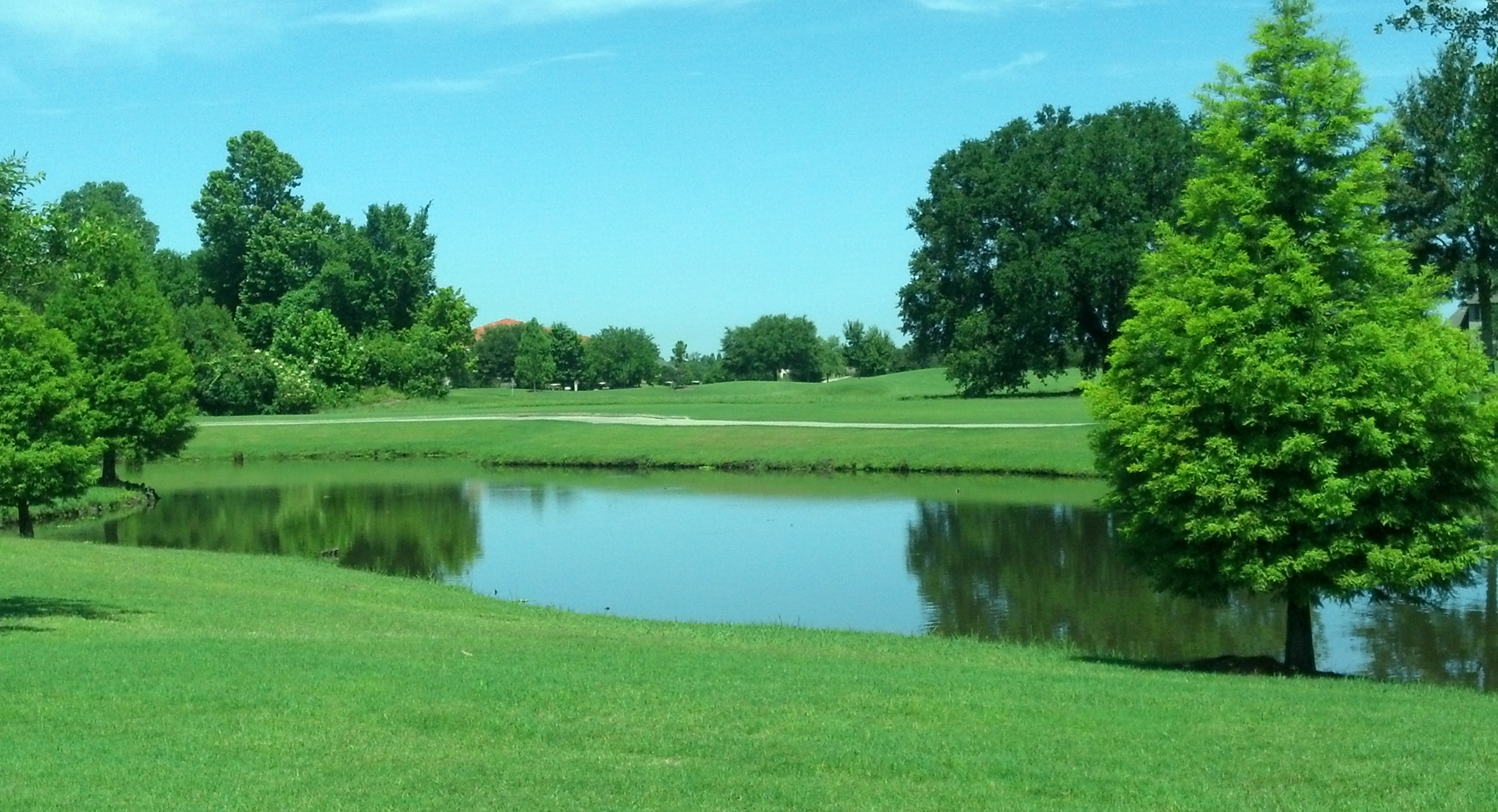
University Club of Baton Rouge golf course

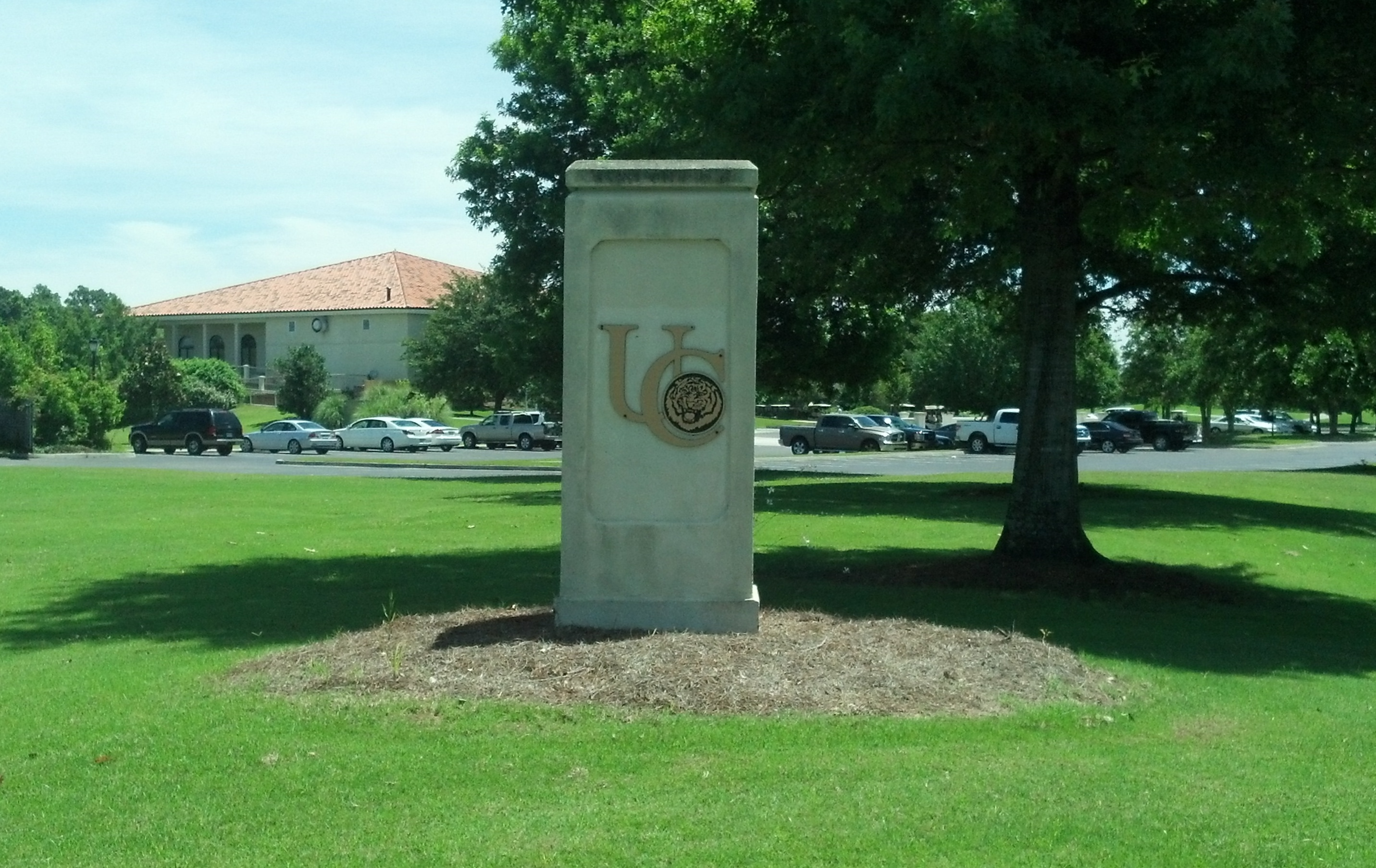
Sign for the University Club of Baton Rouge

== Tournaments ==
The University Club hosted a Regional Tournament for the 2013 NCAA Division I Men's Golf Championship. The PGA L’Auberge Pro-Am of Baton Rouge was held on April 22, 2015. The University Club will host a 2016 NCAA Division I Women's Golf Championship Regional and 2017 NCAA Division I Men's Golf Championship Regional.

== Mary and Woody Bilyeu Golf Practice Facility ==
The Mary and Woody Bilyeu Golf Practice Facility functions as the golf-learning center for the LSU Tigers and Lady Tigers golf teams. The clubhouse lobby and team meeting room showcases the history of both the men’s and women’s golf programs at LSU. The facility also contains locker rooms for the men's and women's teams and an office for each coach. The practice facility features a 100-yard-long tee box and 10,000-square-foot putting green with bunkers around it.

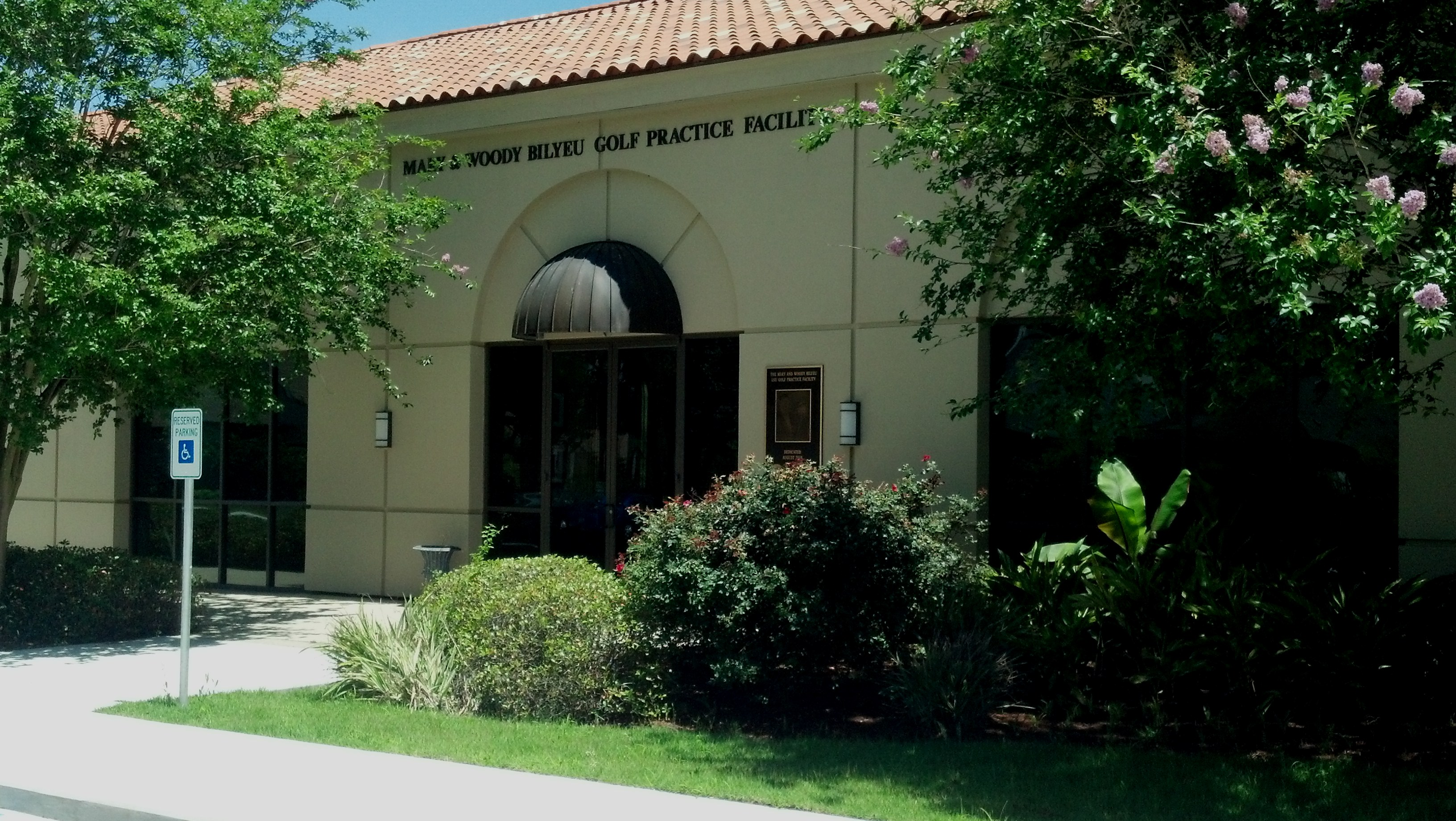
Mary and Woody Bilyeu golf practice facility

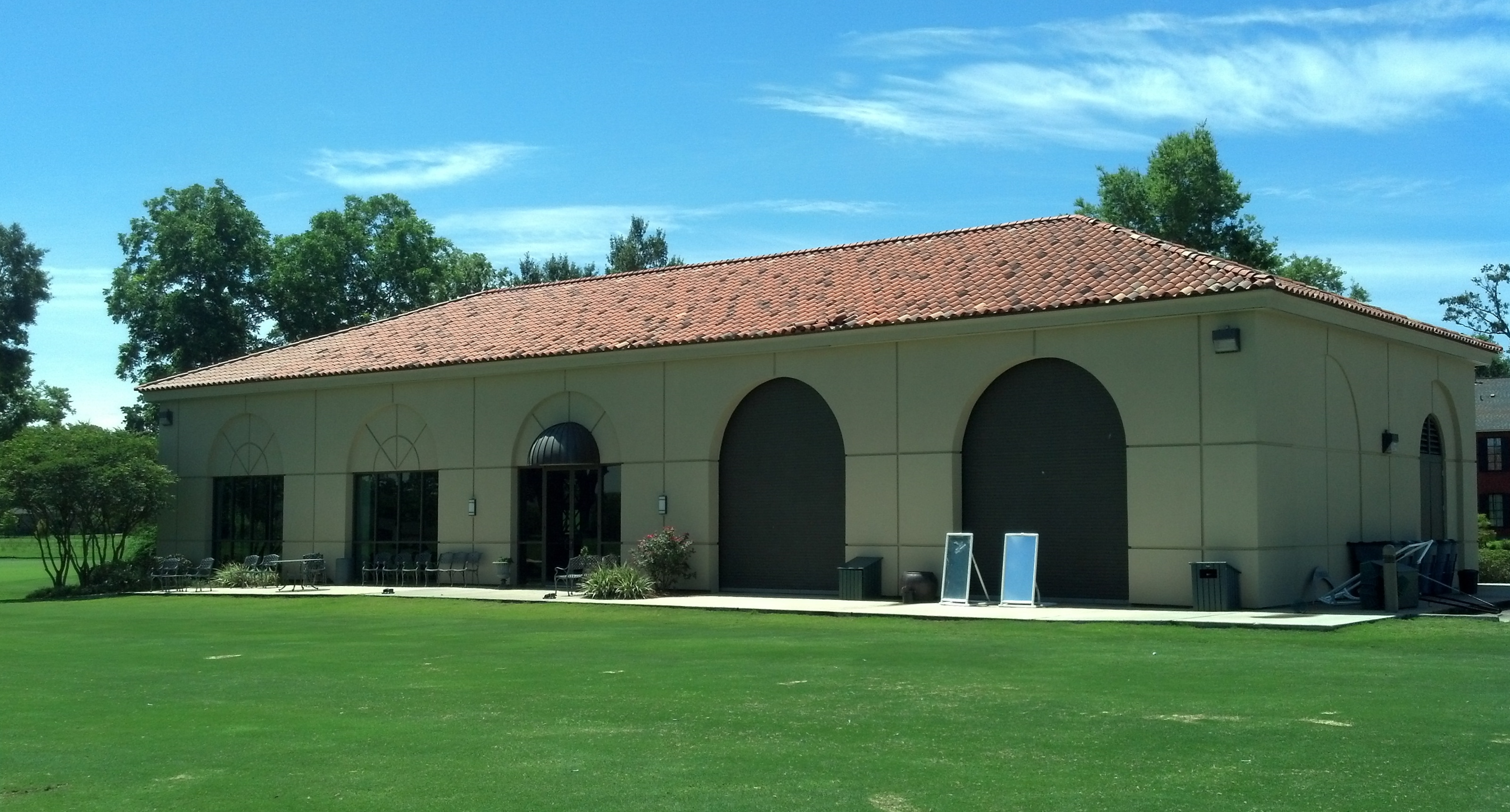
Mary and Woody Bilyeu golf practice facility course

== Club Amenities ==
The University Club is also home to the Chuck Winstead Golf Academy, which is considered to be a state-of-the-art indoor/outdoor instructional facility. The Academy is located on the University Club's driving range and is the largest practice facility in Louisiana.

Besides being the home of the LSU men's and women's golf teams, the private club offers its members other amentiites. The University Club is equipped with a five lane swimming pool. A covered cabana includes snack bar services, restrooms and shower facilities. The pool caters to all members of the club offering lap swimming, open swim and pool parties. In addition to the pool, The University Club has four clay tennis courts and offers tennis lessons. A full-service grill/restaurant named the UC Grill is located on the property.

== See also ==
- LSU Tigers and Lady Tigers
