= Florida State Seminoles men's golf =

- University: Florida State University
- Conference: ACC
- Head coach: Men's: Trey Jones (20th season)
- Location: Tallahassee, Florida
- Course: Don A. Veller Seminole Golf Course; Par: 73; Yards: 7,147
- Nickname: Florida State Seminoles
- Colors: Garnet and gold

NCAA runner-up
- 2024

NCAA match play
- 2010, 2021, 2023, 2024

NCAA Championship appearances
- 1956, 1957, 1958, 1965, 1968, 1969, 1971, 1977, 1979, 1980, 1981, 1982, 1983, 1987, 1989, 1990, 1991, 1993, 1994, 1995, 1996, 1998, 2006, 2007, 2008, 2009, 2010, 2011, 2012, 2013, 2014, 2015, 2016, 2017, 2018, 2021, 2022, 2023, 2024, 2025

Conference champions
- Dixie; 1950 Metro; 1978, 1979, 1980, 1981, 1982, 1984, 1985, 1986, 1987, 1989, 1990 ACC; 2008

Individual conference champions
- Sonny Tinney (1949, 1950); Grant Turner (1979); Paul Azinger (1981); Brian Kamm (1984); Jeremy Robinson (1985, 1986); Nolan Henke (1987); Roger Winchester (1989); Jonas Blixt (2007); John Pak (2019); Frederik Kjettrup (2024)

The Florida State Seminoles men's golf team represents Florida State University (variously Florida State or FSU) in the sport of golf. The Seminoles compete in Division I of the National Collegiate Athletic Association (NCAA) and the Atlantic Coast Conference (ACC). They play their home matches on the Don A. Veller Seminole Golf Course on the university's Tallahassee, Florida campus, and are currently led by head coach Trey Jones.

Some notable alumni of the program are Paul Azinger, Hubert Green, Jeff Sluman, George McNeill, Jonas Blixt, Daniel Berger, and Brooks Koepka.

== History ==
In the 69-year history of the Seminoles' men's golf program, they have won 13 conference championships and 10 Seminoles have won 12 individual conference titles. Two Seminoles, John Pak and Luke Clanton, have won the Ben Hogan Award. The Seminoles finished as national runner-up in 2024.

Florida State is one of just five universities to have had four alumni win the major championships and Florida State alums have won a total of 58 PGA Tour events.

== PGA Tour professionals ==
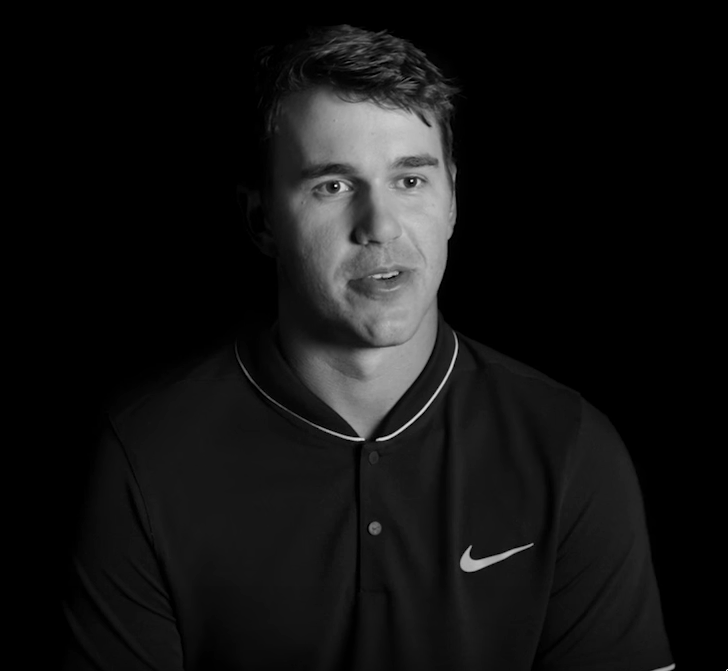
FSU alum Brooks Koepka won consecutive U.S. Open titles in 2017 and 2018 as well as consecutive PGA Championships in 2018 and 2019.

Ten different Florida State alumni have represented the University with wins on the PGA Tour, including former Seminole golfers Hubert Green, winner of the 1977 U.S. Open and the 1985 PGA Championship, Jeff Sluman, winner of the 1988 PGA Championship, Paul Azinger, winner of the 1993 PGA Championship, and Brooks Koepka, winner of the 2017 and 2018 U.S. Open as well as the 2018 and 2019 PGA Championship.

== Don A. Veller Seminole Golf Course ==
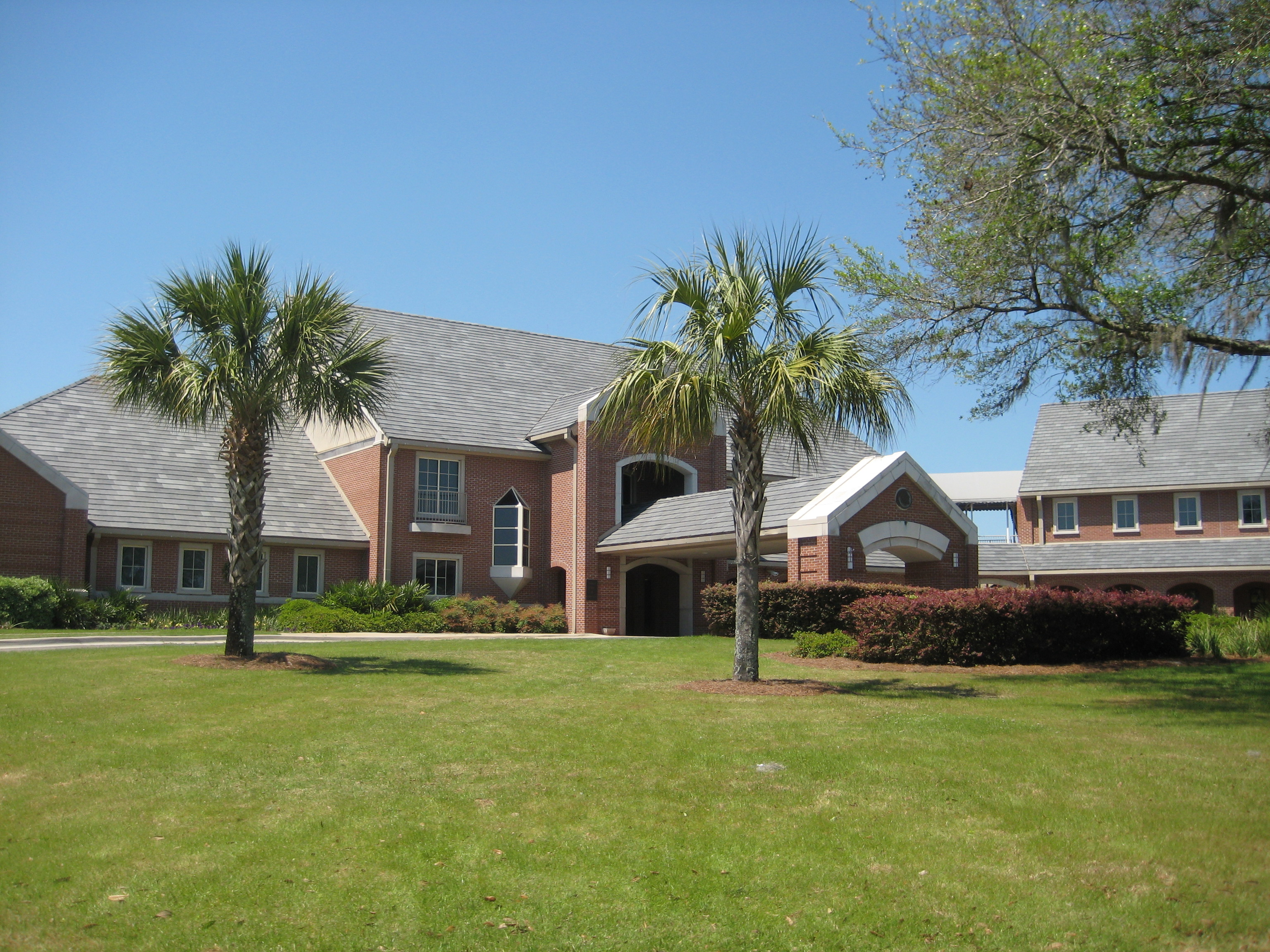
The Don A. Veller Seminole Golf Course, home course of the Florida State Seminoles men's and women's golf teams

The Dave Middleton Golf Complex and the Don Veller Seminole Golf Course are home to the PGA Golf Management Program. In 2017, the University announced that Nicklaus Design had been hired to renovate the course at a cost of $4–6 million.

== See also ==
- Florida State Seminoles
- Florida State Seminoles women's golf
