= LSU Tigers golf =

- University: Louisiana State University
- Conference: SEC
- Head coach: Jake Amos (1st season)
- Location: Baton Rouge, Louisiana
- Course: University Club of Baton Rouge; Par: 72; Yards: 7,700
- Nickname: LSU Tigers
- Colors: Purple and gold

NCAA champions
- 1940, 1942, 1947, 1955, 2015

NCAA individual champions
- Fred Haas (1937); Earl Stewart (1941); John Peterson (2011)

NCAA match play
- 2014, 2015, 2016

NCAA Championship appearances
- 1939, 1940, 1941, 1942, 1943, 1946, 1947, 1948, 1952, 1953, 1954, 1955, 1956, 1966, 1967, 1984, 1985, 1986, 1987, 1988, 1989, 1991, 1992, 1993, 1994, 1997, 2010, 2011, 2013, 2014, 2015, 2016, 2017, 2019 (only top-10 finishes listed before 1984)

Conference champions
- 1937, 1938, 1939, 1940, 1942, 1946, 1947, 1948, 1953, 1954, 1960, 1966, 1967, 1986, 1987, 2015

Individual conference champions
- Fred Haas (1937); Henry Castillo (1939, 1939, 1940); Earl Stewart (1941); Joe Moore (1947); Eddie Merrins (1953, 1954); Don Essig (1960); Howard Fraser (1961); B.R. McLendon (1965, 1966, 1967); Vaughn Moise (1969); Wayne DeFrancesco (1979); John Salamone (1981); Emlyn Aubrey (1984); David Toms (1987)

The LSU Tigers golf team represents the Louisiana State University in the sport of golf. The Tigers compete in Division I of the National Collegiate Athletic Association (NCAA) and the Southeastern Conference (SEC). They play their home matches on the University Club of Baton Rouge in Baton Rouge, Louisiana and are currently coached by Jake Amos. The LSU Tigers golf program has won five NCAA national tournament championships and sixteen SEC championships.

== Team honors ==
The LSU Tigers golf program begun competition in 1932. The Tigers have won five NCAA tournament national championships in 1940 (co-champion with Princeton), 1942 (co-champion with Stanford), 1947, 1955 and 2015.

The Tigers have won sixteen SEC conference championships in 1937, 1938, 1939, 1940, 1942, 1946, 1947, 1948, 1953, 1954, 1960, 1966, 1967, 1986, 1987 and 2015.

== Individual honors ==
Three LSU Tigers have won three NCAA individual national championships. They are Fred Haas (1937), Earl Stewart (1941) and John Peterson (2011).

Thirteen LSU Tigers have won eighteen SEC individual titles. They are Fred Haas (1937), Henry Castillo (1939, 39, 40), Earl Stewart (1941), Joe Moore (1947), Eddie Merrins (1953, 54), Don Essig (1960), Howard Fraser (1961), B.R. McLendon (1965, 66, 67), Vaughn Moise (1969), Wayne DeFrancesco (1979), John Salamon (1981), Emlyn Aubrey (1984) and David Toms (1987)

== Notable players ==
- Brian Bateman, 1 career PGA tour victory
- Gardner Dickinson, 7 career PGA tour victories
- Fred Haas, 5 career PGA tour victories
- Jay Hebert, winner of 1960 PGA Championship, 7 career PGA tour victories
- Smylie Kaufman, 1 career PGA tour victory
- Mac McLendon, 4 career PGA tour victories
- Johnny Pott, 5 career PGA tour victories
- Earl Stewart, 3 career PGA tour victories
- David Toms, winner of 2001 PGA Championship, 2018 U.S. Senior Open, 13 career PGA tour victories

== Coaching staff ==
Chuck Winstead is the head coach of the LSU Tigers golf team. He has been head coach since 2006. He was also a member of the LSU golf team from 1989-1991.

== Facilities ==
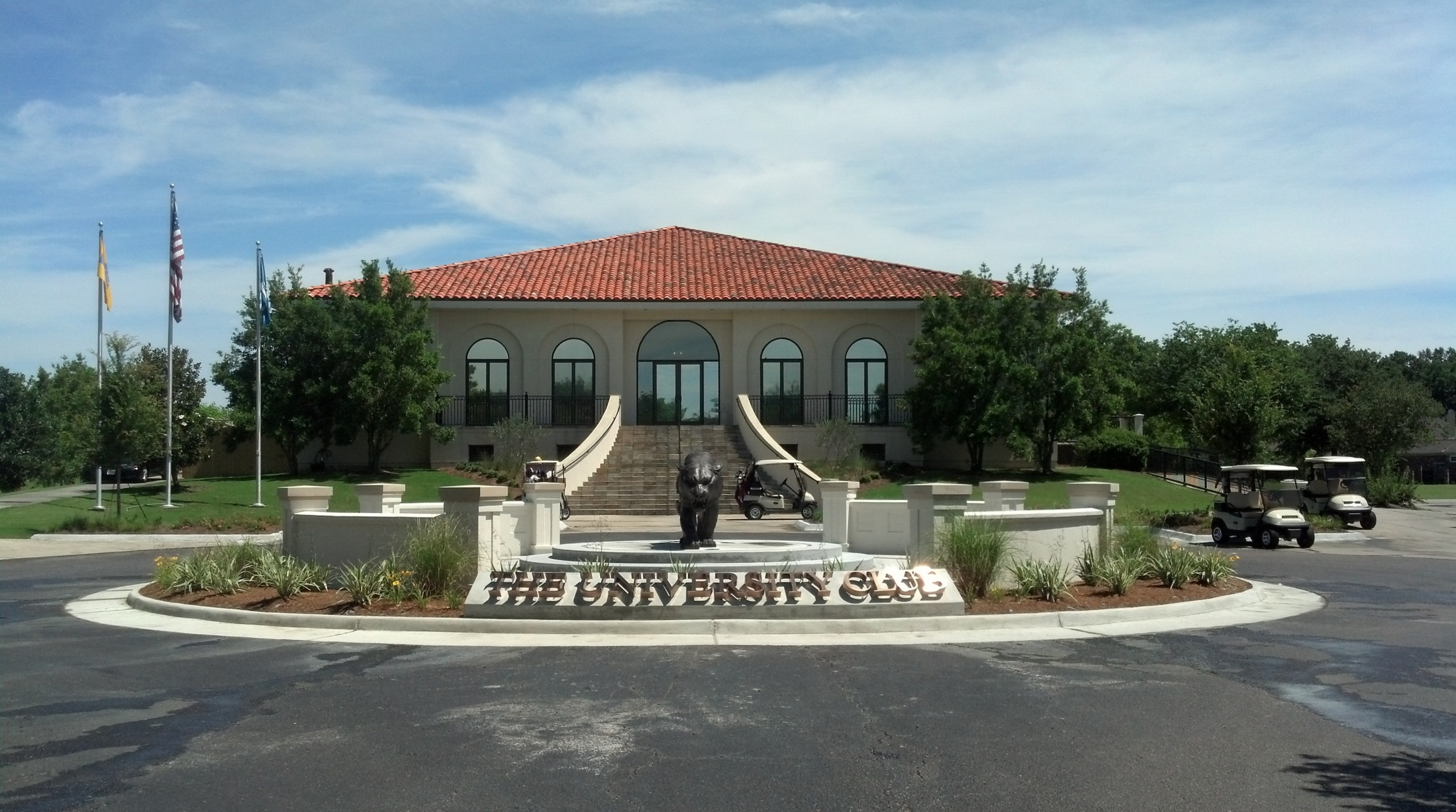
University Club of Baton Rouge

=== University Club of Baton Rouge ===
The University Club of Baton Rouge in Baton Rouge, Louisiana, is the home of the LSU Tigers and LSU Lady Tigers golf teams and serves as the host site for all of LSU's tournaments. The University Club is a private facility that was built to be the permanent home of LSU Golf. It has a 7,700 yard, par-72 championship-caliber, 300-acre course.

=== Mary and Woody Bilyeu Golf Practice Facility ===
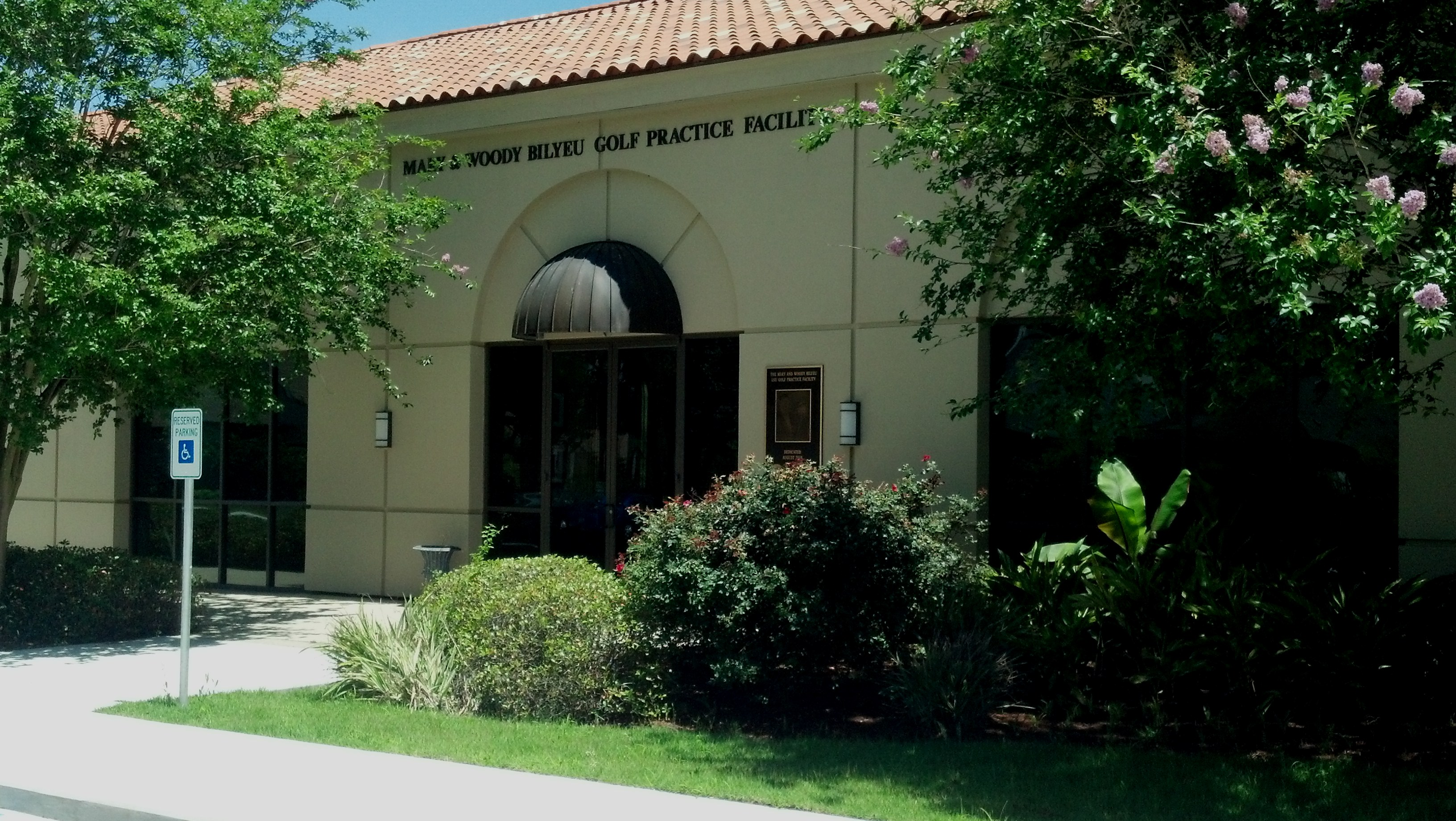
Mary and Woody Bilyeu Golf Practice Facility

The Mary and Woody Bilyeu Golf Practice Facility functions as the golf-learning center for the LSU Tigers and Lady Tigers golf teams. The clubhouse lobby and team meeting room showcases the history of both the men’s and women’s golf programs at LSU. The facility also contains locker rooms for the men's and women's teams and an office for each coach. The practice facility features a 100-yard-long tee box and 10,000-square-foot putting green with bunkers around it.

== See also ==
- LSU Tigers and Lady Tigers
