= Sam Voinoff =

American football and golf coach (1907–1989)

Biographical details
- Born: February 22, 1907; Bulgaria
- Died: November 17, 1989 (aged 82); Lee County, Florida
- Education: Purdue University

Coaching career (HC unless noted)
- 1944–1945: Purdue
- 1950–1974: Purdue

Accomplishments and honors

Championships
- 10× Big Ten championships (1953, 1955, 1956, 1958, 1959, 1960, 1964, 1965, 1967, 1971); NCAA Championship (1961)

Samuel Voinoff (February 22, 1907 – November 17, 1989) was an American college football and golf coach at Purdue University. He coached Purdue to 10 Big Ten titles and one NCAA national championship in golf. He was the president of the Golf Coaches Association of America from 1962 to 1964 and 1970 to 1971. He is a 1995 Boilermaker Hall of Fame inductee.

== Head coaching record ==
Record table
Season	Team	Overall	Conference	Standing	Postseason
Purdue (Big Ten Conference) (1944–1945)
1944–45	Purdue			8th	
Purdue (Big Ten Conference) (1950–1974)
1950–51	Purdue			2nd	NCAA, 5th
1951–52	Purdue			2nd	NCAA, T–3rd
1952–53	Purdue			1st	NCAA, 9th
1953–54	Purdue			4th	NCAA, 10th
1954–55	Purdue			1st	NCAA, T–9th
1955–56	Purdue			1st	NCAA, T–2nd
1956–57	Purdue			5th	NCAA, 11th
1957–58	Purdue			1st	NCAA, T–10th
1958–59	Purdue			1st	NCAA, 2nd
1959–60	Purdue			1st	NCAA, T–2nd
1960–61	Purdue			4th	NCAA, 1st
1961–62	Purdue			2nd	NCAA, 6th
1962–63	Purdue			3rd	NCAA, T–11th
1963–64	Purdue			1st	NCAA, 22nd
1964–65	Purdue			1st	NCAA, T–4th
1965–66	Purdue			7th	NCAA, T–18th
1966–67	Purdue			1st	NCAA, 4th
1967–68	Purdue			4th	
1968–69	Purdue			2nd	
1969–70	Purdue			5th	NCAA, 10th
1970–71	Purdue			1st	
1971–72	Purdue			7th	
1972–73	Purdue			4th	
1973–74	Purdue			6th	
Purdue:		977–294–10			
Total:		977–294–10			
National champion Postseason invitational champion Conference regular season champion Conference regular season and conference tournament champion Division regular season champion Division regular season and conference tournament champion Conference tournament champion
