= Big Ten Conference Men's Golf Championship =

American collegiate golf competition

Tournament information
- Location: 2026: North Plains, Oregon
- Established: 1920
- Course: 2026: Pumpkin Ridge Golf Club
- Par: 2026: 72
- Format: 54-hole stroke play 4-team stroke play
- Month played: May

Current champion
- Team: UCLA; Individual: Josh Kim (UCLA)

The Big Ten Men's Golf Championship, played in late April or early May, is an annual 54-hole, stroke-play collegiate tournament for all eighteen teams in the Big Ten Conference. Teams play 18 holes daily over three days to determine both a team champion and an individual medalist. Five players compete for each team, with the lowest four individual scores counting toward the team's daily total. The school with the lowest 54-hole cumulative total secures the conference championship and earns an automatic bid to the NCAA Division I men's golf championship.

The first championship, held in 1920, was a match play team competition, but since 1921, the competition has been a stroke play format, changing number of holes and contributing number of players over the years.

== Results ==
Year	Site	Host course	Team championship				Individual champion	Score
Year	Site	Host course	Champion	Score	Runner-up	Score	Individual champion	Score
72 holes, match play
1920	Olympia Fields, IL	Olympia Fields Country Club	Drake (Note: Invited non-conference participant.)	28 down	Chicago	37 down	B. Knepper (Chicago)	303
36 hole team medal play with top four individual scores
1921	Winnetka, IL	Indian Hills	Drake	684	Chicago	698	Robert McKee (Drake)	1 up
1922	Chicago, IL	Midlothian Country Club	Chicago	639	Michigan	665	B.E. Ford (Chicago)	1 up
1923	Evanston, IL	Evanston Golf Club	Illinois	643	Chicago	648	R.E. Rolfe (Illinois)	5 & 3
1924	Deerfield, IL	Briargate Gold Club	Chicago	663	Michigan	669	M.J. Holdsworth (Michigan)	3 & 1
1925	Wilmette, IL	Sunset Ridge Country Club	Northwestern	669	Michigan	673	K.E. Hisert (Chicago)	3 & 2
Individual 72 hole medal
1926	Lake Forest, IL	Lake Shore Country Club	Chicago	659	Illinois	662	K.E. Hisert (Chicago)	316
72 hole team play
1927	Evanston, IL	Tam O'Shanter Golf Course	Illinois	1305	Chicago & Michigan	1327	Les Bolstad (Minnesota)	313
1928	Columbus, OH	Scioto Country Club	Ohio State	1323	Michigan	1348	John Lehman (Purdue)	314
1929	Minneapolis, MN	University Golf Course	Minnesota	1331	Michigan	1338	Les Bolstad (Minnesota)	313
1930	Wilmette, IL	Wilmette Country Club	Illinois	1247	Michigan	1258	Richard Martin (Illinois)	305
1931	Ann Arbor, MI	University Golf Course	Illinois	1293	Michigan	1298	Richard Martin (Illinois)	311
1932	Minneapolis, MN	University Golf Course	Michigan	1248	Minnesota	1272	Johnny Fischer (Michigan)	303
1933	Carmel, IN	Prairie View Golf Club	Michigan	1291	Minnesota	1306	Johnny Fischer (Michigan)	301
1934	Carmel, IN	Prairie View Golf Club	Michigan	1228	Minnesota	1268	Chuck Kocsis (Michigan)	283
1935	Carmel, IN	Prairie View Golf Club	Michigan	1163	Northwestern	1223	Johnny Fischer (Michigan)	281
1936	Carmel, IN	Prairie View Golf Club	Michigan	1190	Northwestern	1240	Chuck Kocsis (Michigan)	286
1937	Carmel, IN	Prairie View Golf Club	Northwestern	1244	Michigan	1253	Sid Richardson (Northwestern)	301
1938	Minneapolis, MN	University Golf Course	Minnesota	1255	Northwestern	1260	Sid Richardson (Northwestern)	305
1939	Carmel, IN	Prairie View Golf Club	Northwestern	1197	Michigan	1226	Chase Fannon (Northwestern)	295
1940	Columbus, OH	Ohio State University Golf Club	Illinois	1245	Michigan	1254	William Gilbert (Ohio State)	298
1941	Lake Forest, IL	Lake Forest Country Club	Illinois	1228	Michigan & Ohio State	1268	Alex Welsh (Illinois)	297
1942	Ann Arbor, MI	University Golf Course	Michigan	1255	Minnesota	1258	James McCarthy (Illinois)	301
1943	Wilmette, IL	Wilmette Country Club	Michigan	1289	Northwestern	1292	Ben Smith (Michigan) & James Teale (Minnesota)	311
1944	Medinah, IL	Medinah Country Club	Michigan	623	Purdue	650	John Jenswold (Michigan)	153
1945	Evanston, IL	Northwestern University Golf Club	Ohio State	603	Northwestern	626	Howard Baker (Ohio State) & John Lorms (Ohio State)	148
1946	Minneapolis, MN	University Golf Course	Michigan	1220	Ohio State	1237	John Jacobs (Iowa)	294
1947	Lafayette, IN	Lafayette Country Club	Michigan	1237	Ohio State	1242	Ed Schalon (Michigan) & Howard B. Saunders (Ohio State)	297
Top five individual scores
1948	Evanston, IL	Northwestern University Golf Club	Northwestern	1531	Purdue	1544	Fred Wampler (Purdue)	296
1949	Ann Arbor, MI	University Golf Course	Michigan	1499	Ohio State	1557	Ed Schalon (Michigan) & Fred Wampler (Purdue)	297
1950	Columbus, OH	Ohio State University Golf Club	Purdue	1464	Ohio State	1510	Fred Wampler (Purdue)	284
1951	Evanston, IL	Northwestern University Golf Club	Ohio State	1528	Purdue	1540	Gene Coulter (Purdue)	290
1952	Champaign, IL	University Golf Course	Michigan	1559	Purdue	1575	Doug Koepke (Wisconsin)	306
1953	Madison, WI	University Golf Course	Purdue	1514	Michigan	1532	Don Albert (Purdue)	290
1954	Minneapolis, MN	University Golf Course	Ohio State	1527	Iowa	1549	Bob Benning (Purdue)	298
1955	Lafayette, IN	Purdue Golf Course	Purdue	1141	Ohio State	1147	Roger Rubendall (Wisconsin)	216
1956	Wilmette, IL	Wilmette Country Club	Purdue	1501	Michigan	1508	Joe Campbell (Purdue)	281
1957	Iowa City, IA	University Golf Course	Wisconsin	1512	Iowa	1520	Joe Campbell (Purdue)	290
1958	Columbus, OH	Ohio State University Golf Club	Purdue	1522	Indiana	1544	John Konsek (Purdue)	293
1959	Ann Arbor, MI	University Golf Course	Purdue	1555	Michigan	1575	John Konsek (Purdue)	301
1960	East Lansing, MI	Forest Akers Golf Courses	Purdue	1520	Michigan State	1531	John Konsek (Purdue)	282
1961	Bloomington, IN	Indiana Universtiy Golf Course	Ohio State	1527	Minnesota	1536	Jack Nicklaus (Ohio State)	283
1962	Champaign, IL	University Golf Course	Indiana	1509	Purdue	1514	Mike Toliuszis (Illinois)	288
1963	Madison, WI	University Golf Course	Minnesota	1523	Wisconsin	1524	Roger Eberhardt (Wisconsin)	292
1964	Minneapolis, MN	University Golf Course	Purdue	1487	Indiana	1505	Byron Comstock (Indiana)	290
1965	West Lafayette, IN	Purdue University Golf Course	Purdue	1472	Michigan	1486	Bill Newton (Michigan)	287
1966	Iowa City, IA	University Golf Course	Ohio State	1480	Michigan	1502	John Seehausen (Northwestern)	286
1967	Ann Arbor, MI	University Golf Course	Purdue	1554	Michigan	1562	Steve Mayhew (Purdue)	298
1968	Bloomington, IN	Indiana Universtiy Golf Course	Indiana	1511	Michigan State	1523	Bill Brask (Minnesota)	293
1969	East Lansing, MI	Forest Akers Golf Courses	Michigan State	1501	Purdue	1507	Don Padgett (Indiana)	290
1970	Champaign, IL	University Golf Course	Indiana	1542	Minnesota	1555	Randy Erskine (Michigan)	302
1971	Columbus, OH	Ohio State University Golf Club	Purdue	1501	Michigan State	1510	Dave Haberle (Minnesota)	293
1972	Minneapolis, MN	University Ridge Golf Course	Minnesota	1440	Indiana	1456	Jim Bergeson (Minnesota)	281
1973	West Lafayette, IN	Purdue University Golf Course	Indiana	1484	Ohio State	1492	Steve Groves (Ohio State)	289
1974	Iowa City, IA	Finkbine Golf Course	Indiana	1471	Ohio State	1499	John Harris (Minnesota)	285
1975	Bloomington, IN	Indiana Universtiy Golf Course	Indiana	1484	Ohio State	1501	Bob Ackerman (Indiana) & Gary Biddinger (Indiana)	294
1976	Ann Arbor, MI	University Golf Course	Ohio State	1510	Indiana	1542	Ralph Guarsci (Ohio State)	298
1977	East Lansing, MI	Forest Akers West Golf Course	Ohio State	1434	Indiana	1461	Mark Balen (Ohio State)	285
1978	Columbus, OH	Ohio State University Golf Club	Ohio State	1483	Indiana	1542	John Cook (Ohio State)	290
1979	Champaign, IL	University Golf Course	Ohio State	1489	Indiana	1497	John Cook (Ohio State) & Rick Borg (Ohio State)	290
1980	Madison, WI	University Golf Course	Ohio State	1471	Michigan	1488	John Morse (Michigan)	288
1981	Minneapolis, MN	University Ridge Golf Course	Purdue	1417	Ohio State	1419	Joey Sindelar (Ohio State)	271
1982	West Lafayette, IN	Purdue University Golf Course	Ohio State	1452	Indiana	1468	Mike Chadwick (Illinois)	284
1983	Iowa City, IA	Finkbine Golf Course	Ohio State	1440	Indiana	1484	Chris Perry (Ohio State)	283
1984	Bloomington, IN	Indiana Universtiy Golf Course	Ohio State	1475	Indiana	1492	Mike Ingram (Indiana)	286
1985	Ann Arbor, MI	University Golf Course	Ohio State	1474	Purdue	1516	Clark Burroughs (Ohio State)	280
Top four individual scores
1986	East Lansing, MI	Forest Akers West Golf Course	Ohio State	1159	Illinois	1168	Jim Benepe (Northwestern) & Steve Stricker (Illinois)	283
1987	Columbus, OH	Ohio State University Golf Club	Ohio State	1155	Northwestern	1211	Robert Huxtable (Ohio State)	283
1988	Champaign, IL	University Golf Course	Illinois	1166	Ohio State	1186	Steve Stricker (Illinois)	279
1989	Madison, WI	University Golf Course	Ohio State	1155	Illinois	1162	Steve Stricker (Illinois)	277
1990	Minneapolis, MN	University Golf Course	Ohio State	1160	Illinois	1171	Chris Smith (Ohio State)	282
1991	West Lafayette, IN	Purdue University Golf Course	Indiana	1138	Ohio State	1149	Shaun Micheel (Indiana)	276
1992	Iowa City, IA	Finkbine Golf Course	Iowa	1139	Ohio State	1152	Brad Klapprott (Iowa)	282
1993	Bloomington, IN	Bloomington Country Club	Wisconsin	1159	Ohio State	1166	Jamie Fairbanks (Illinois)	286
1994	Ann Arbor, MI	University Golf Course	Wisconsin	1151	Northwestern	1154	Ben Walter (Wisconsin)	274
1995	Verona, WI	University Ridge Golf Course	Ohio State	1175	Purdue	1197	Scott Rowe (Northwestern)	284
1996	University Park, PA	Penn State Golf Courses	Ohio State	1173	Wisconsin	1187	Jon Loosemore (Northwestern)	288
1997	Columbus, OH	Ohio State University Golf Club	Ohio State	1185	Northwestern	1187	Kyle Dobbs (Michigan)	287
1998	East Lansing, MI	Forest Akers Golf Courses	Indiana	1177	Ohio State	1180	Ryan Armour (Ohio State)	287
1999	Minneapolis, MN	Les Bolstad Golf Course	Northwestern	1131	Minnesota	1134	Michael Harris (Michigan) & Larry Nuger (Illinois)	278
2000	West Lafayette, IN	Birck Boilermaker Golf Complex	Northwestern	1160	Purdue	1193	Luke Donald (Northwestern)	287
2001	Champaign, IL	University Golf Course	Northwestern	1132	Purdue	1145	Luke Donald (Northwestern)	279
2002	Iowa City, IA	Finkbine Golf Course	Minnesota	1152	Illinois	1156	Eric Jorgensen (Michigan State)	280
2003	Bloomington, IN	Indiana Universtiy Golf Course	Minnesota	1122	Illinois	1128	Matt Anderson (Minnesota)	276
54-hole team play
2004	Ann Arbor, MI	University Golf Course	Ohio State	842	Illinois	847	Kevin Hall (Ohio State)	199
2005	Verona, WI	University Ridge Golf Course	Michigan State	847	Indiana	852	Jeff Overton (Indiana)	199
72-hole team play
2006	Verona, WI	University Ridge Golf Course	Northwestern	1160	Minnesota	1169	Chris Wilson (Northwestern)	280
2007	Columbus, OH	Ohio State University Golf Club	Minnesota & Michigan State	1192			Pariya Junhasavasdikul (Purdue)	285
2008	East Lansing, MI	Forest Akers West Golf Course	Michigan State	1173	Minnesota	1177	Jorge Campillo (Indiana)	278
2009	East Lansing, MI	Forest Akers West Golf Course	Illinois	1149	Minnesota	1162	Eric Chun (Northwestern)	283
2010	Maple Plain, MN	Windsong Farm Golf Club	Illinois	1157	Iowa	1160	David Lipsky (Northwestern)	281
2011	West Lafayette, IN	Birck Boilermaker Golf Complex	Illinois	1160	Northwestern	1179	Luke Guthrie (Illinois)	287
2012	French Lick, IN	Pete Dye Course at French Lick	Illinois	1175	Indiana	1178	Luke Guthrie (Illinois)	283
2013	French Lick, IN	Pete Dye Course at French Lick	Illinois	1163	Minnesota	1172	Thomas Pieters (Illinois)	284
2014	French Lick, IN	Pete Dye Course at French Lick	Minnesota	1186	Illinois	1190	Charlie Danielson (Illinois) & Jose Mendez (Minnesota)	289
2015	Newburgh, IN	Victoria National Golf Club	Illinois	1138	Iowa	1170	Nick Hardy (Illinois) & Carson Schaake (Iowa)	284
54-hole team play
2016	Newburgh, IN	Victoria National Golf Club	Illinois	838	Iowa	851	Thomas Detry (Illinois)	206
2017	Baltimore, MD	Baltimore Country Club	Illinois	829	Northwestern	845	Dylan Meyer (Illinois)	205
2018	Baltimore, MD	Baltimore Country Club	Illinois	836	Ohio State	851	Nick Hardy (Illinois)	204
2019	Flourtown, PA	Philadelphia Cricket Club	Illinois	868	Purdue	873	Adrien Dumont de Chassart (Illinois) & Angus Flanagan (Minnesota)	212
2020	Cancelled due to COVID-19							
2021	Carmel, IN	Crooked Stick Golf Club	Illinois	883	Iowa	884	Mac McClear (Iowa)	215
2022	French Lick, IN	Pete Dye Course at French Lick	Illinois	885	Michigan State	886	David Nyfjäll(Northwestern)	215
2023	Galloway, NJ	Galloway National Golf Club	Illinois	560 (Note: Tournament shortened due to weather.)	Northwestern	577	Mac McClear (Iowa) & Daniel Svärd (Northwestern)	139
2024	Columbus, OH	Scioto Country Club	Northwestern	863	Illinois	878	Daniel Svärd (Northwestern)	211
2025	Baltimore, MD	Baltimore Country Club	UCLA	842	Illinois	843	Omar Morales (UCLA)	203
2026	North Plains, OR	Pumpkin Ridge Golf Club	UCLA	832	Illinois	836	Josh Kim (UCLA)	202

== Team titles ==
Team	Ttitles	Years won
Ohio State	23	1928, 1945, 1951, 1954, 1961, 1966, 1976, 1977, 1978, 1979, 1980, 1982, 1983, 1984, 1985, 1986, 1987, 1989, 1990, 1995, 1996, 1997, 2004
Illinois	20	1923, 1927, 1930, 1931, 1940, 1941, 1988, 2009, 2010, 2011, 2012, 2013, 2015, 2016, 2017, 2018, 2019, 2021, 2022, 2023
Michigan	12	1932, 1933, 1934, 1935, 1936, 1942, 1943, 1944, 1946, 1947, 1949, 1952
Purdue	12	1950, 1953, 1955, 1956, 1958, 1959, 1960, 1964, 1965, 1967, 1971, 1981
Northwestern	9	1925, 1937, 1939, 1948, 1999, 2000, 2001, 2006, 2024
Minnesota	8	1929, 1938, 1973, 1972, 2002, 2003, 2007c, 2014
Indiana	8	1962, 1968, 1970, 1973, 1974, 1975, 1991, 1998
Michigan State	4	1969, 2005, 2007c, 2008
Chicago	3	1922, 1924, 1926
Wisconsin	3	1957, 1993, 1994
UCLA	2	2025, 2026
Iowa	1	1992

== Individual champions ==
These men have won more than one individual championship:

- 3: Johnny Fischer, Fred Wampler, John Konsek, Steve Stricker
- 2: K.E. Hisert, Les Bolstad, Richard Martin, Chuck Kocsis, Sid Richardson, Ed Schalon, Joe Campbell, John Cook, Luke Donald, Luke Guthrie, Nick Hardy, Mac McClear, Daniel Svärd

== See also ==
- NCAA Division I Men's Golf Championship
