= Purdue Boilermakers men's golf =

American golf team

- University: Purdue University
- Conference: Big Ten
- Head coach: Men's: Andrew Sapp (3rd season)
- Location: West Lafayette, Indiana
- Course: Birck Boilermaker Golf Complex; Par: 72; Yards: 7,465
- Nickname: Boilermakers
- Colors: Old gold and black

NCAA champions
- 1961

NCAA individual champions
- Fred Wampler (1950); Joe Campbell (1955)

NCAA Championship appearances
- 1947, 1949, 1950, 1951, 1952, 1953, 1954, 1955, 1956, 1957, 1958, 1959, 1960, 1961, 1962, 1963, 1964, 1965, 1966, 1967, 1970, 1981, 2001, 2002, 2004, 2005, 2014, 2016, 2017, 2024, 2025, 2026

Conference champions
- 1950, 1953, 1955, 1956, 1958, 1959, 1960, 1964, 1965, 1967, 1971, 1981

Individual conference champions
- John Lehman (1928); Fred Wampler (1948); Fred Wampler (1949); Fred Wampler (1950); Gene Coulter (1951); Don Albert (1953); Bob Benning (1954); Joe Campbell (1956); Joe Campbell (1957); John Konsek (1958); John Konsek (1959); John Konsek (1960); Steve Mayhew (1967); Pariya Junhasavasdikul (2007)

The Purdue Boilermakers men's golf team represents the Purdue University in the sport of golf. The Boilermakers compete in Division I of the National Collegiate Athletic Association (NCAA) and the Big Ten Conference. They are currently led by head coach Rob Bradley. The Purdue Boilermakers men's golf program has won 12 Big Ten Conference championships and one NCAA national team championship in 1961. The first year of golf at Purdue was in 1921.

== Championships ==
Purdue's 1921 golf team

- NCAA National Champions: 1961
- Big Ten Team Championships: 1950, 1953, 1955, 1956, 1958, 1959, 1960, 1964, 1965, 1967, 1971, 1981
- NCAA Championship (Individual): 1950 – Fred Wampler
- NCAA Championship (Individual): 1955 – Joe Campbell

== Facilities ==
The Purdue men's golf team practices and plays at the Birck Boilermaker Golf Complex located on Cherry Lane. The golf complex consists of two, 18-hole Pete Dye golf courses, the Tom Spurgeon Training Center, a range, two putting greens, and two chipping greens.

=== Ackerman-Allen Golf Course ===
Ackerman-Allen was originally called the "Purdue South Course" due to its location just south of Cherry Lane. The course was built in 1934 by Indiana Golf Hall of Famer Bill Diddle. Purdue South Course was modified in 1968 by Larry Packard and again in 1996 with the opening of the Birck Boilermaker Golf Complex. The name of the course was changed to Ackerman Hills Golf Course after receiving donations by the Ackerman Family. Ackerman Hills underwent extreme renovations in 2014 by golf course architect Pete Dye with goals of creating a championship-caliber golf course while maintaining its parkland style. The renovations not only expanded the course to nearly 7600 yards from the championship tees, but also incorporated improvements in drainage, irrigation, and pace of play. Modifications to the old, severe-sloping greens were made to accommodate for the faster green speeds demanded nowadays. Tee boxes and tree placement and replacement were also parts of the renovations. These renovations were finished in 2016 and were made possible due to donations by the Ackerman family as well as Samuel R Allen. After renovations, the name was changed to the Ackerman-Allen Golf Course. The finalized, par-72 course features rolling hills, white sand bunkers, and tree lined fairways. The course uses bent grass for its fairways, tees, and greens and offers five tee sets.

Ackerman-Allen Course
Tee	Rating/Slope	1	2	3	4	5	6	7	8	9	Out	10	11	12	13	14	15	16	17	18	In	Total
Black	76.8 / 137	461	605	390	370	300	543	180	401	478	3728	376	434	434	187	560	487	574	253	513	3818	7546
Blue	73.2 / 128	398	580	360	360	192	531	171	394	415	3401	363	390	402	161	457	446	545	204	469	3437	6838
White	70.9 / 125	361	490	343	350	167	521	154	376	401	3163	351	382	379	144	449	436	515	172	372	3200	6363
Gold	69.2 / 121	345	479	334	339	146	497	136	359	380	3015	308	354	363	127	441	409	479	155	352	2988	6003
Silver	65.9 / 114	313	439	305	285	123	420	112	300	357	2654	278	300	332	92	399	349	426	102	323	2601	5255
Par		4	5	4	4	3	5	3	4	4	36	4	4	4	3	5	4	5	3	4	36	72
SI		10	8	14	12	16	6	18	4	2		11	5	17	13	9	1	7	15	3

=== Kampen Course ===
Kampen Course, originally called the "Purdue North Course," was renovated by Pete Dye in 1996. Dye collaborated with Purdue students in the departments of forestry, entomology, water quality testing, agronomy as well as the superintendent to create a challenging championship course. The renovations included a water reclamation process which allows for the water used on the course to be recycled. The course was renamed to honor Emerson Kampen for his support of Purdue athletics. The Kampen Course is a links-style course featuring vast sand bunkers, native grasslands, ponds and a natural celery bog. The par-72 course has four tee sets and measures over 7400 yards from the championship tees. It uses bent grass for its fairways, tees, and greens. Kampen has been rated one of the top collegiate courses in the nation and was awarded 4.5 stars on Golf Digest's "Places to Play." Kampen has also been rated as one of the hardest golf courses in Indiana. Each year, Purdue holds the Boilermaker Invitational at the Kampen course.

Due to its notoriety, Kampen has hosted these golf tournaments:

- 1999 Big Ten Women's Championship
- 2000 Big Ten Men's Championship
- 2000 Western Junior Championship
- 2001 NCAA Women's Central Regional
- 2003 NCAA Women's Championships
- 2004 NCAA Men's Regional
- 2004 Indiana Open
- 2005 Women's Western Amateur
- 2005 Trusted Choice Big 'I' Junior Classic
- 2008 NCAA Men's Championships
- 2009 Big Ten Women's Championship
- 2011 Big Ten Men's Championship
- 2017 NCAA Men's Regional
- 2017, 2020 Indiana Open
- 2021 Boilermaker Classic (Forme Tour)
- 2024 NCAA Men's Regional Championship
- 2025 Dye Junior Invitational
- 2025 Junior PGA Championship

Kampen Course
Tee	Rating/Slope	1	2	3	4	5	6	7	8	9	Out	10	11	12	13	14	15	16	17	18	In	Total
Black	76.5 / 146	392	185	482	534	230	598	365	406	478	3670	607	483	477	183	385	362	608	206	484	3795	7465
Blue	73.8 / 141	380	165	437	494	194	581	309	383	426	3369	558	413	414	173	385	355	554	184	469	3505	6874
White	71.6 / 135	365	150	422	478	168	553	290	367	392	3185	515	396	387	153	327	342	524	167	415	3226	6411
Gold	M:70.5 / 130 W:74.9 / 130	353	134	402	466	142	489	272	355	374	2987	492	380	373	137	317	327	510	148	396	3080	6067
Silver	M:66.7 / 121 W:70.5 / 121	280	122	324	399	122	439	231	316	355	2588	443	296	321	116	294	292	453	117	340	2672	5260
Par		4	3	4	5	3	5	4	4	4	36	5	4	4	3	4	4	5	3	4	36	72
SI		10	12	2	16	14	6	18	8	4		13	5	3	15	9	17	11	7	1

=== Tom Spurgeon Training Center ===
This 11,400 square foot training center features heated hitting bays where players can hit balls off artificial turf out onto the range from inside. The hitting bays are equipped with down-the-line and face-on cameras for the Purdue golf team to take videos on and analyze their swings. The training center also has a large, indoor, turf putting room to practice putting during the winter. Also included in the training center are locker rooms for the men's and women's golf team, a lounge area with a TV, and a club repair room.

== Individual honors ==
=== All-Americans ===
- John Konsek – 1958 (1st), 1959 (1st), 1960 (1st)
- Gene Francis – 1958 (3rd), 1959 (2nd), 1960 (3rd)
- Mike Darnell – 1961 (HM)
- Jerry Jackson – 1961 (HM). 1962 (HM)
- Terry Winter – 1963 (3rd). 1964 (1st)
- Bob Zender – 1965 (2nd)
- Rick Radder – 1966 (HM)
- Steve Meyhew – 1967 (2nd)
- Jim Duffy – 1967 (HM)
- Don Klenk – 1968 (HM)
- Jeff Radder – 1969 (2nd), 1970 (HM)
- Fred Clark – 1970 (2nd)
- Bill Hoffer – 1971 (1st)
- Tom Fox – 1974 (HM)
- Rick Dalpos – 1981 (3rd)
- Lenny Hartlage – 1984 (HM)
- Chris Kite – 1984 (HM)
- Lee Williamson – 2001 (HM), 2002 (1st)
- Shiv Kapur – 2002 (HM), 2004 (HM)
- Cole Bradley – 2021 (HM)
- Herman Sekne – 2023 (3rd), 2024 (HM)
- Supapon Amornchaichan – 2025 (HM)

Note: 1st = first team, 2nd = second team, 3rd = third team, HM = honorable mention

== Record by year ==
Tournament champion	National champion

Year	Coach	Conference	Postseason (Note: The first NCAA Division I championship was held in 1939.)
Big Ten (1921–present)
1920–21	No Coach	—	
1921–22	G. A. Young	6th	
1922–23	Burr Swezey	6th	
1923–24	Burr Swezey	—	
1924–25	Burr Swezey	—	
1925–26	Burr Swezey	—	
1926–27	Burr Swezey	4th	
1927–28	Burr Swezey	—	
1928–29	Jack Bixler	—	
1929–30	Jack Bixler	8th	
1930–31	Jack Bixler	7th	
1931–32	Jack Bixler	—	
1932–33	Jack Bixler	—	
1933–34	Jack Bixler	5th	
1934–35	Jack Bixler	9th	
1935–36	Jack Bixler	9th	
1936–37	Jack Bixler	7th	
1937–38	Harry Allspaw	8th	
1938–39	Harry Allspaw	T-7th	
1939–40	Harry Allspaw	9th	
1940–41	Harry Allspaw	9th	
1941–42	Harry Allspaw	8th	
1942–43	Harry Allspaw	—	
1943–44	Harry Allspaw	2nd	
1944–45	Sam Voinoff	8th	
1945–46	Loomis Heston	8th	
1946–47	Loomis Heston	3rd	NCAA, T–14th
1947–48	Loomis Heston	2nd	
1948–49	Loomis Heston	3rd	NCAA, T–2nd
1949–50	Loomis Heston	1st	NCAA, 2nd
1950–51	Sam Voinoff	2nd	NCAA, 5th
1951–52	Sam Voinoff	2nd	NCAA, T–3rd
1952–53	Sam Voinoff	1st	NCAA, 9th
1953–54	Sam Voinoff	4th	NCAA, 10th
1954–55	Sam Voinoff	1st	NCAA, T–9th
1955–56	Sam Voinoff	1st	NCAA, T–2nd
1956–57	Sam Voinoff	5th	NCAA, 11th
1957–58	Sam Voinoff	1st	NCAA, T–10th
1958–59	Sam Voinoff	1st	NCAA, 2nd
1959–60	Sam Voinoff	1st	NCAA, T–2nd
1960–61	Sam Voinoff	4th	NCAA, 1st
1961–62	Sam Voinoff	2nd	NCAA, 6th
1962–63	Sam Voinoff	3rd	NCAA, T–11th
1963–64	Sam Voinoff	1st	NCAA, 22nd
1964–65	Sam Voinoff	1st	NCAA, T–4th
1965–66	Sam Voinoff	7th	NCAA, T–18th
1966–67	Sam Voinoff	1st	NCAA, 4th
1967–68	Sam Voinoff	4th	
1968–69	Sam Voinoff	2nd	
1969–70	Sam Voinoff	5th	
1970–71	Sam Voinoff	1st	
1971–72	Sam Voinoff	7th	
1972–73	Sam Voinoff	4th	
1973–74	Sam Voinoff	6th	
1974–75	Joe Campbell	T–5th	
1975–76	Joe Campbell	3rd	
1976–77	Joe Campbell	T–8th	
1977–78	Joe Campbell	5th	
1978–79	Joe Campbell	9th	
1979–80	Joe Campbell	4th	
1980–81	Joe Campbell	1st	NCAA, T–25th
1981–82	Joe Campbell	T–3rd	
1982–83	Joe Campbell	T–8th	
1983–84	Joe Campbell	4th	
1984–85	Joe Campbell	2nd	
1985–86	Joe Campbell	7th	
1986–87	Joe Campbell	7th	
1987–88	Joe Campbell	9th	
1988–89	Joe Campbell	6th	
1989–90	Joe Campbell	10th	
1990–91	Joe Campbell	9th	
1991–92	Joe Campbell	11th	
1992–93	Joe Campbell	11th	
1993–94	Bob Prange	11th	
1994–95	Bob Prange	2nd	
1995–96	Bob Prange	8th	
1996–97	Bob Prange	8th	
1997–98	Bob Prange	9th	
1998–99	Devon Brouse	11th	
1999–2000	Devon Brouse	2nd	
2000–01	Devon Brouse	2nd	NCAA, 28th
2001–02	Devon Brouse	3rd	NCAA, 7th
2002–03	Devon Brouse	5th	
2003–04	Devon Brouse	4th	NCAA, T–16th
2004–05	Devon Brouse	5th	NCAA, T–23rd
2005–06	Devon Brouse	3rd	
2006–07	Devon Brouse	3rd	
2007–08	Devon Brouse	9th	
2008–09	Devon Brouse	T-8th	
2009–10	Devon Brouse	5th	
2010–11	Devon Brouse	T-6th	
2011–12	Devon Brouse	5th	
2012–13	Devon Brouse	7th	
2013–14	Rob Bradley	5th	NCAA, 27th
2014–15	Rob Bradley	8th	
2015–16	Rob Bradley	T-6th	NCAA, 29th
2016–17	Rob Bradley	T-4th	NCAA, 28th
2017–18	Rob Bradley	8th	
2018–19	Rob Bradley	2nd	
2019–20	Rob Bradley		
2020–21	Rob Bradley	7th	
2021–22	Rob Bradley	6th	
2022–23	Rob Bradley	T-7th	
2023–24	Rob Bradley	3rd	NCAA, 30th
2024–25	Andrew Sapp	9th	NCAA, 27th
2025–26	Andrew Sapp	T-6th	NCAA, 23rd

- Totals updated through the end of the 2025–2026 school year.
