= 1958 NCAA golf championship =

1958 NCAA Golf Championship
Tournament information
- Location: Williamstown, Massachusetts, U.S. 42.706°N 73.202°W
- Course: Taconic Golf Club

Statistics
- Field: 34 teams

Champion
- Team: Houston (3rd title); Individual: Phil Rodgers, Houston

Location map
- Location in the United States Location in Massachusetts

The 1958 NCAA Golf Championship was the 20th annual NCAA-sanctioned golf tournament to determine the individual and team national champions of men's collegiate golf in the United States.

The tournament was held at Taconic Golf Club in Williamstown, Massachusetts, hosted by Williams College.

Two-time defending champions Houston won the team title, the Cougars' third NCAA team national title.

== Individual results ==
=== Individual champion ===
- Phil Rodgers, Houston

=== Tournament medalists ===
- Phil Rodgers, Houston (139)
- Ab Justice, Oklahoma State (139)

== Team results ==
| Rank | Team | Score |
|---|---|---|
| 1 | Houston (DC) | 570 |
| 2 | Oklahoma State | 582 |
| 3 | USC | 583 |
| 4 | Maryland | 584 |
| 5 | North Texas State | 591 |
| 6 | Rollins | 593 |
| T7 | SMU | 596 |
| T7 | Stanford | 596 |
| 9 | Georgia | 597 |
| T10 | Arizona State | 602 |
| T10 | Fresno State | 602 |
| T10 | Purdue | 602 |

- Note: Top 10 only
- DC = Defending champions
