= Purdue Boilermakers =

Intercollegiate athletics teams of Purdue University, West Lafayette, Indiana

- University: Purdue University
- Nickname: Boilermakers
- NCAA: Division I (FBS)
- Conference: Big Ten Conference
- Athletic director: Tommy McClelland
- Location: West Lafayette, Indiana
- Varsity teams: 18
- Football stadium: Ross–Ade Stadium
- Basketball arena: Mackey Arena
- Baseball stadium: Alexander Field
- Softball stadium: Bittinger Stadium
- Soccer stadium: Folk Field
- Other venues: Birck Boilermaker Golf Complex; Boilermaker Cross Country Course; Burke Aquatic Center; Holloway Gymnasium; Lambert Fieldhouse; Rankin Track & Field; Schwartz Tennis Center
- Colors: Old gold and black
- Mascot: Boilermaker Special; Purdue Pete
- Fight song: Hail Purdue!
- Website: purduesports.com

The Purdue Boilermakers are the official intercollegiate athletics teams representing Purdue University, located in West Lafayette, Indiana. As is common with athletic nicknames, the Boilermakers nickname is also used as colloquial designation of Purdue's students and alumni at large. The nickname is often shortened to "Boilers" by fans. Purdue is one of the few college athletic programs that is not funded by student fees or subsidized by the university.

== Origin of "Boilermakers" nickname ==
In 1889, the Purdue football team played Wabash College in Crawfordsville, Indiana, and won the game 18–4. Students from the college and citizens of Crawfordsville began calling the Purdue players "a great big burly gang of corn-huskers", "grangers", "pumpkin-shuckers", "railsplitters", "blacksmiths," "cornfield sailors", and "foundry hands". The Purdue students experienced hands-on education at the university, including the maintenance of a fully operational steam locomotive.

Purdue defeated Wabash College again in 1891, 44–0. An account of the game in the Crawfordsville Daily Argus News of October 26, 1891, was headlined, "Slaughter of Innocents: Wabash Snowed Completely Under by the Burly Boiler Makers from Purdue". Purdue became known as the Boilermakers the next year.

Several of the local schools added to the boilermaker tradition by suggesting that Purdue was going up the Wabash River and hiring workers from the nearby Monon railroad yards to play football. Purdue's official mascot is a locomotive, the Boilermaker Special. The Monon Railroad had its main locomotive shops in Lafayette, not far from campus.

Purdue's athletic teams wear a combination of old-gold, black, and white, colors that have identified Purdue since 1887.

== Varsity sports ==
Big Ten logo in Purdue's colors

Men's sports	Women's sports
Baseball	Softball
Basketball	Basketball
Cross country	Cross country
Football	Soccer
Golf	Golf
Swimming & diving	Swimming & diving
Tennis	Tennis
Track and field^{†}	Track and field^{†}
Wrestling	Volleyball
† – Track and field includes both indoor and outdoor.

=== Baseball ===
The Purdue Boilermakers baseball team have been conference champions twice, in 1909 and 2012. In 1987, 2012 and 2018 they appeared in the NCAA tournament.

=== Basketball ===
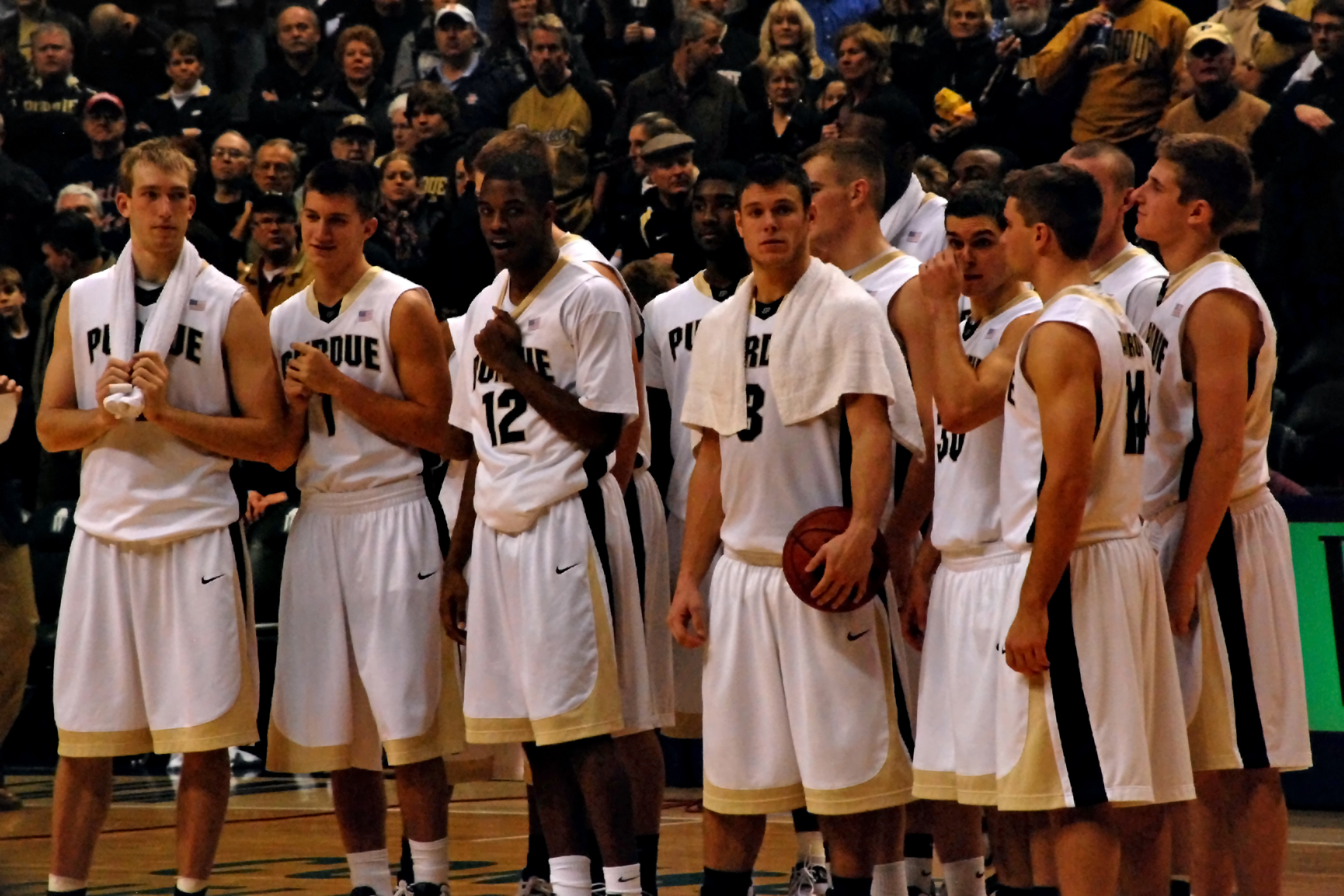
Purdue men's basketball team in 2009

The Boilermaker men's and women's basketball teams have won more Big Ten Championships (regular season and tournament) than any other conference school, with 37 conference banners, including a league-leading 24 for the men's team. Men's former head coach Gene Keady coached his final season with the Boilermakers in the 2004–2005 season after 25 years with the Boilermakers. Coach Keady became Purdue's all-time-winningest coach on December 6, 1997. In his years at Purdue, Keady led the Boilermakers to a 512–270 record and a .655 winning percentage.

The current coach of the Boilermaker men's basketball team is Matt Painter. A former player and Purdue Alum under Keady, Painter is now in his 20th season as the head coach and is currently second on the school's all-time wins list.

In the 2024 NCAA Tournament, Painter guided Purdue to their first Final Four in 44 years, and first National Championship game since 1969.

=== Football ===
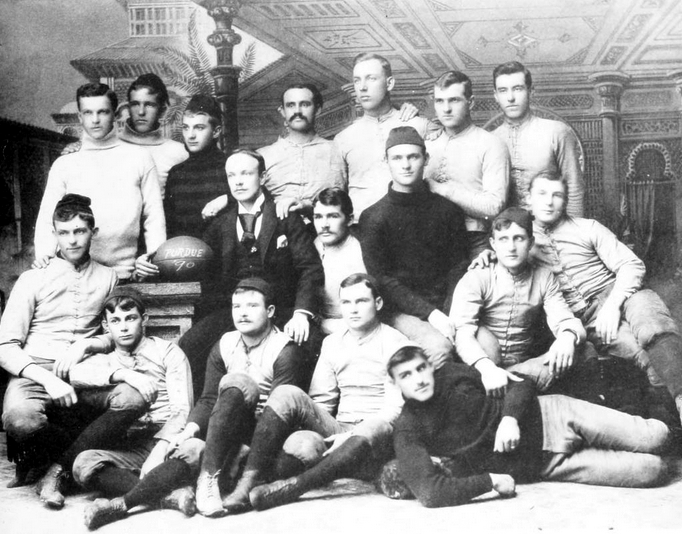
Purdue's 1890 team

In the early 1890s Purdue fielded dominating football teams. In 1891 Purdue went 4–0, outscoring opponents 192–0. In 1892 Purdue went 8–0, outscoring opponents 320–24. In 1893 Purdue went 5–2–1, outscoring opponents 334–144. In 1894 Purdue went 9–1, outscoring opponents 288–36. Over these four years, Purdue's combined record was 26–3–1, outscoring opponents 1134–204. Purdue beat in-state rival Indiana University 60–0, 68–0, 64–0, and 6–0 by an understandable forfeit. Purdue went 2–1 against Illinois, 2–1 Wisconsin, 3–0 against Chicago and split 2 games with Michigan.

The Purdue Boilermakers competed as an independent until 1889. In 1890, they joined the Indiana Intercollegiate Athletic Association and, finally, was a founding member of the Big Ten Conference in 1896. The Purdue Boilermakers were Big Ten Conference Champions in 1918, 1929, 1931, 1932, 1943, 1952, 1967, and 2000. However, they made their first appearance in the Rose Bowl – the "grand-daddy of them all" – with a 1966 second-place finish in the Big Ten; conference rules at that time prevented Michigan State from appearing in consecutive Rose Bowls. The Boilermakers, under NFL hall-of-famer Bob Griese, defeated the University of Southern California Trojans 14–13 to win the 1967 Rose Bowl. When the Boilermakers shared the Big Ten title the following season, the consecutive-appearance rule kept them out of the 1968 Rose Bowl. Purdue did not return to the Rose Bowl until 2001, under future New Orleans Saints quarterback, Drew Brees, losing to the University of Washington Huskies 34–24.

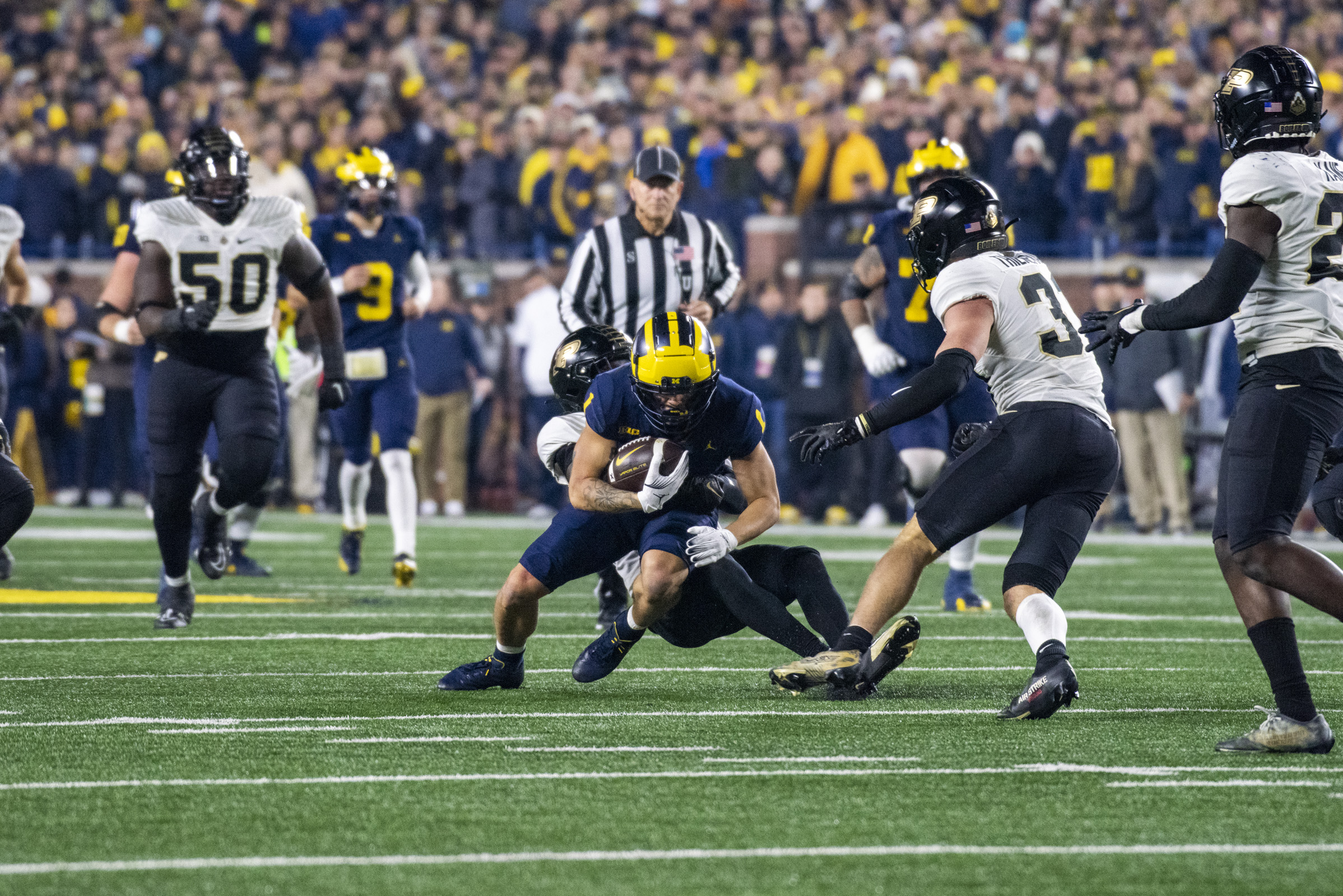
Purdue v Michigan game in 2023

The Boilermakers have appeared in a total of 21 post-season bowl games, compiling a record of 11–10. Their most recent victory was a 48–45 victory over the University of Tennessee Volunteers in the 2021 Music City Bowl, with their most recent appearance being a 63–7 defeat dealt by the LSU Tigers at the 2023 Citrus Bowl.

Purdue has traditionally been called the "Cradle of Quarterbacks", having produced NFL stars Cecil Isbell, Dale Samuels, Bob DeMoss, NFL Hall of Famer and Super Bowl MVP Len Dawson, NFL Hall of Famer Bob Griese, Mike Phipps, Gary Danielson, Mark Herrmann, Scott Campbell, Jim Everett, Eric Hunter, Billy Dicken, Kyle Orton, and Super Bowl MVP Drew Brees. Purdue QBs have thrown more touchdowns in the NFL than those from any other university, 1,754 at the end of the 2023 season. In 2011, there were three starting quarterbacks in the NFL from Purdue: Drew Brees of the New Orleans Saints, Kyle Orton of the Denver Broncos, and Curtis Painter of the Indianapolis Colts. Current NFL QBs are David Blough of the Detroit Lions and Aidan O'Connell of the Las Vegas Raiders. The team is currently coached by Barry Odom.

=== Men's golf ===
Men's golf team of 1921

The Purdue golf team inaugural season was in 1921. The team earned a national championship in 1961, and have been Big Ten champions twelve times. The team has had two NCAA individual champions: Fred Wampler in 1950 and Joe Campbell in 1955. The team has also earned 12 Big Ten championships through 2017.

=== Women's soccer ===
The Boilermakers' first season of soccer was in 1998, but began Big Ten play in 1999. The team has achieved eight NCAA tournament berths, their first being in 2002 and their most recent being in the 2026 season. The Boilermakers furthest run in the NCAA tournament was in 2003, advancing to the third round. The Boilermakers have also reached the Big Ten tournament in eleven different seasons, with two tournament wins: one in 2007 under coach Jack Warner, and most recently in 2026 under head coach Richard Moodie.

=== Softball ===
The Boilermaker softball team began play in 1994. The team has made two NCAA Tournament appearances in 2008 and 2009. The current head coach is Magali Frezzotti.

=== Women's volleyball ===
The Purdue Boilermakers Women's Volleyball team started play in 1975 and has made the AIAW/NCAA tournament 27 times since. This includes five trips to the regional finals. The team has been coached by Dave Shondell since 2003.

=== Wrestling ===
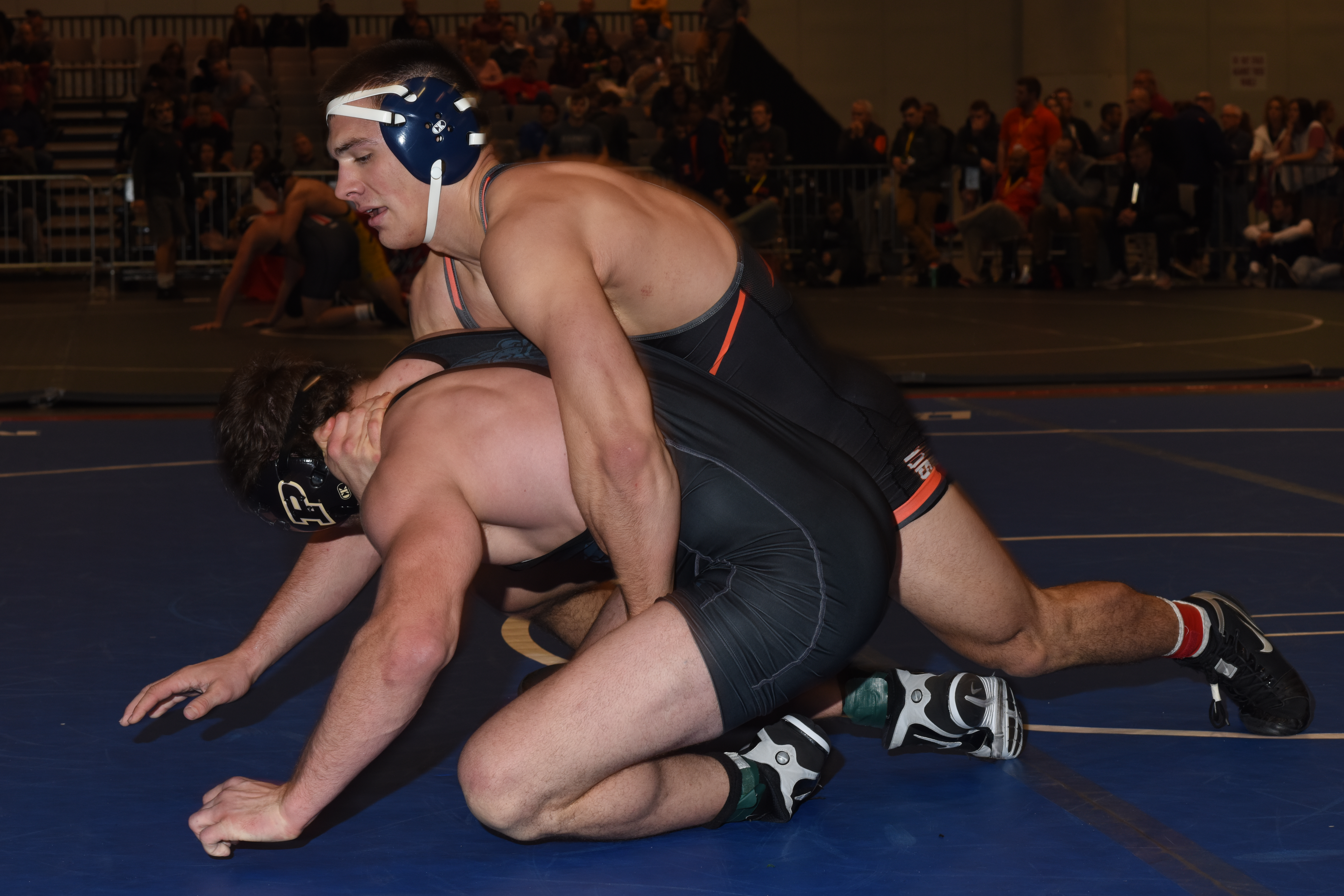
Wrestling in 2018

The Purdue Boilermaker wrestling team started in the 1913–1914 season. As a team, the Boilermakers have placed as high as 2nd at the NCAA National Championships, and have had individual wrestlers qualify for the NCAA tournament for over 25 years straight. The team is coached by Tony Ersland, who wrestled for the University of Iowa under legendary coach Dan Gable. He is assisted by Tyrel Todd, Kendric Maple, and Jake Sueflohn. The team competes in the Big Ten Conference. Purdue Wrestling practices in the Blake Wrestling Training Center and competes on campus in the Holloway Gymnasium (2,288).

== Championships ==
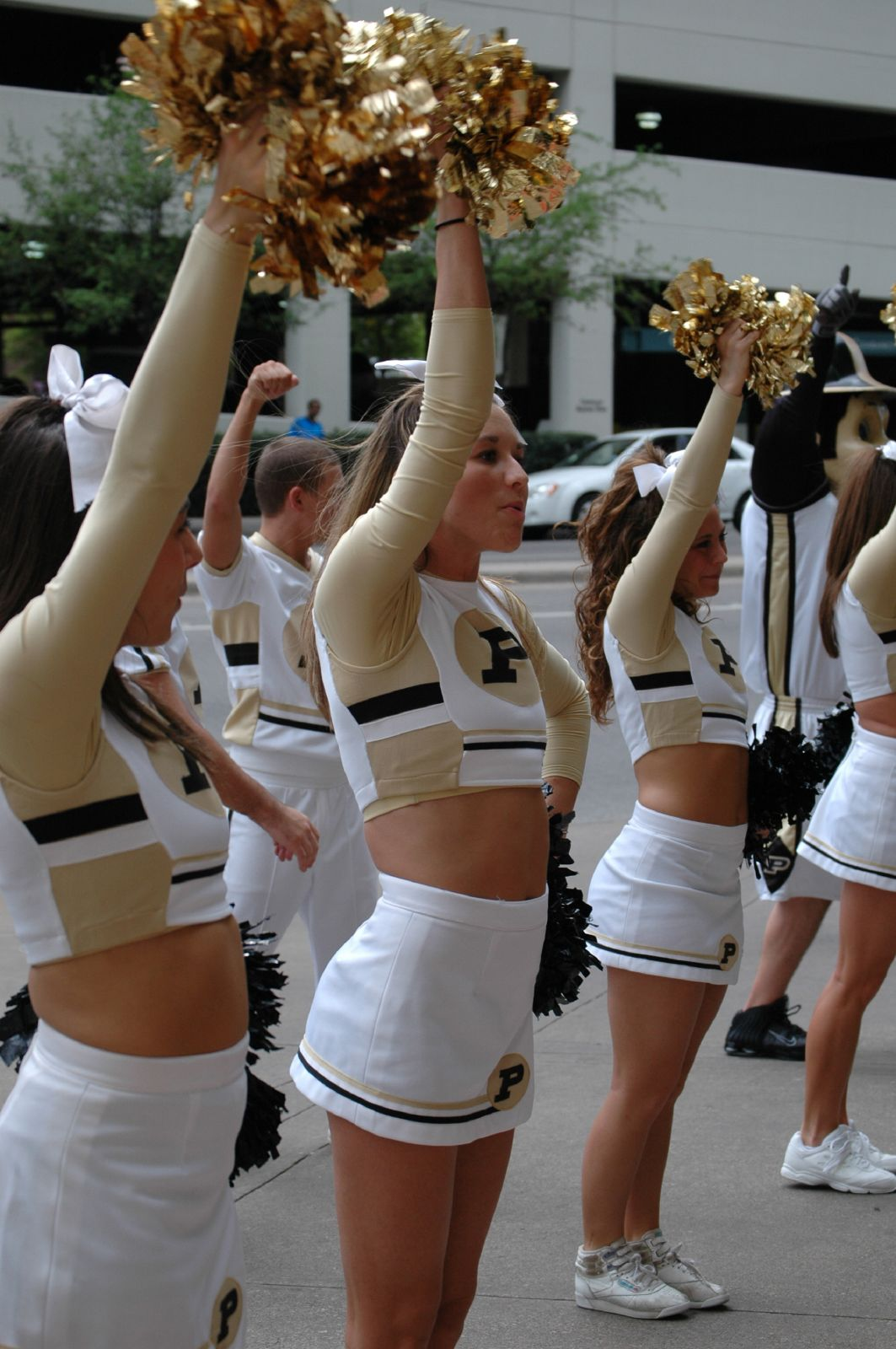
Purdue Cheer Squad

=== NCAA team championships ===
Purdue University has won 3 NCAA national championships:

- Men's (1)
  - Golf (1): 1961
- Women's (2)
  - Basketball (1): 1999
  - Golf (1): 2010

=== Other national team titles ===
- Not bestowed by the NCAA:
  - Men's basketball (1): 1932 (retroactive Helms and Premo-Porretta selections)
  - Football (1): 1931 (Parke Davis)

== Athletic accomplishments ==
=== Baseball ===
- Big Ten Champions: 1909, 2012

=== Basketball ===
==== Men's ====
- NCAA Championship Runner-Up: 1969, 2024
- NCAA Final Four: 1969, 1980, 2024
- NIT Champions: 1974
- NIT Championship Runner-Up: 1979, 1982
- Big Ten Champions: 1911, 1912c, 1921c, 1922, 1926c, 1928c, 1930, 1932, 1934, 1935c, 1936c, 1938, 1940, 1969, 1979c, 1984c, 1987c, 1988, 1994, 1995, 1996, 2010c, 2017, 2019c, 2023, 2024
- Big Ten tournament Champions: 2009, 2023, 2026
- Helms National Champions: 1932
- Premo-Porretta Champions: 1932

==== Women's ====
- NCAA National Champions: 1999
- NCAA Championship Runner-Up: 2001
- NCAA Final Four: 1994, 1999, 2001
- Big Ten Champions: 1991, 1994c, 1995c, 1997c, 1999, 2001, 2002
- Big Ten tournament Champions: 1998, 1999, 2000, 2003, 2004, 2007, 2008, 2012, 2013

=== Cross country: men ===
- Big Ten Champions: 1916, 1941, 1943

=== Cross country: women ===
- Big Ten Champions: 1980†

=== Football ===
- Bowl Game Victories: 1967 Rose Bowl, 1978 Peach Bowl, 1979 Bluebonnet Bowl, 1980 Liberty Bowl, 1997 Alamo Bowl, 1998 Alamo Bowl, 2002 Sun Bowl, 2007 Motor City Bowl, 2011 Little Caesars Pizza Bowl, 2017 Foster Farms Bowl, 2021 Music City Bowl
- Big Ten Champions: 1918c, 1929, 1931c, 1932c, 1943c, 1952c, 1967c, 2000c
- National Championship: 1931 – Parke Davis

=== Field hockey ===
- Big Ten Champions: 1978†, 1979†

=== Golf: men ===
- NCAA Championship (Individual): 1950 – Fred Wampler, 1955 – Joe Campbell
- NCAA National Champions (Team): 1961
- Big Ten Champions: 1950, 1953, 1955, 1956, 1958, 1959, 1960, 1964, 1965, 1967, 1971, 1981

=== Golf: women ===
- NCAA Championship (Individual): 2009 – María Hernández
- NCAA National Champions: 2010
- Big Ten Champions: 2000, 2006, 2008, 2009, 2010, 2013

=== Soccer: women ===
- Big Ten tournament Champions: 2007, 2026

=== Softball ===
- Women's College World Series appearance: 1972

=== Swimming and diving: men ===
- NCAA Men's Championship 1-meter (Individual): David Boudia - 2010, 2011; Steele Johnson - 2015, 2017
- NCAA Men's Championship 3-meter (Individual): David Boudia – 2009, 2010, 2011; Steele Johnson – 2017
- NCAA Men's Championship Platform (Individual): David Boudia – 2009; Steele Johnson – 2015; Brandon Loschiavo – 2021; Tyler Downs – 2022

=== Tennis: women ===
- Big Ten Champions: 2012

=== Track and field: women ===
Indoor

- Big Ten Champions: 2001

Outdoor

- Big Ten Champions: 1987, 1999, 2017

=== Volleyball ===
- Big Ten Champions: 1979†, 1980†, 1982, 1985

=== Wrestling ===
- Big Ten Champions: 1942, 1945, 1948, 1949, 1950, 1954

c = Co-Champions

† = Women's championships were not fully sanctioned with the Big Ten Conference until the 1981–1982 season.

== Non-varsity sports ==
=== Crew ===
The Purdue Crew is a student athletic rowing club established in 1949. It is the largest such club on campus with an average of 130 members throughout the season. The program competes nationwide against both club and D1 programs. As a club, the crew is supported by Purdue University's Department of Recreational Sports by employing the head and assistant coach positions. Strong alumni support has allowed for much of the growth and success of the program by financing equipment and facilities. The club sponsors or supports several annual events, including the Hunger Hike and the Feast of the Hunter's Moon. Notably, Amanda Elmore from Purdue Crew's class of 2013 won an Olympic gold medal in 2016 in the Women's 8+ category.

=== Equestrian ===
Purdue is home to both an English and Western riding program. Their English team specializes in Hunt Seat and is a member of the Intercollegiate Horse Show Association. The Purdue Equestrian team was founded in 1980 by Jerry Steinmetz, who coached the team until 2017. His daughter, Krista Steinmetz, became the coach in that year. The team has reached the Intercollegiate Horse Show Association (IHSA) Nationals twenty times, placing in the top 10 ten times. The team has a student-run executive board in which current Purdue students help run the club.

=== Gymnastics ===
Purdue gymnastics competes in National Association of Intercollegiate Gymnastics Clubs (NAIGC) with a 2nd place men's finish in both 2015 and 2016. In 2019, the team placed 1st in the modified NCAA division.

=== Men's ice hockey ===
The Purdue University Hockey Club was founded in the 1960s and currently competes in the Division III Indiana Collegiate Hockey Conference of the American Collegiate Hockey Association. As the Lafayette metropolitan area does not have an ice rink, they play their home games the Fishers Fuel Tank and the Carmel Ice Skadium.

=== Men's lacrosse ===
The men's club lacrosse team was founded in 1971 by David Hoof. The team currently competes in the MCLA's Upper Midwest Lacrosse Conference. In 2013, the team played in the Great Rivers Lacrosse Conference's East division, which they won with a 9–5 record, going on to win the conference championship, earning a bid to the MCLA tournament where they lost in the first round to top ranked Colorado State. They had similar success in the 2015 season, going 9–6 and winning the conference championship, then losing to top ranked Grand Canyon in the first round. Their next season went the same, ending 9–6, winning the conference championship, and losing in the first round of the MCLA tournament, this time to Chapman. The team's current coach is Dan Sahm, former Boilermaker captain, defensive player of the year, and HM All-American.

=== Men's soccer ===
Since at least the 1930s, Purdue has fielded a club soccer team. The club team reached the 1951 Soccer Bowl, which predated the NCAA Division I Men's Soccer Tournament as the national championship for men's soccer. There, Purdue lost to Penn State. The team has won the Club Soccer National Championship 3 times, in 1991, 1994, and 2019.

=== Men's volleyball ===
Purdue has a successful men's volleyball program that competes in the National Collegiate Volleyball Federation (NCVF). Purdue won the Big Ten Championship tournament in 2014.

=== Rugby ===
Founded in 1970, Purdue plays college rugby in the Big Ten Universities conference against its traditional Big 10 rivals such as Indiana, and also plays in the annual Big 10 rugby sevens tournament each fall. Purdue men's rugby is led by head coach Casey Doten, and Purdue women's rugby is led by head coach Lake Paul.

=== Water skiing ===
The Purdue Water Ski Team was formed in 1980 and qualified for their first national championships in 1984. Purdue represented the Midwest Region at the National Championships for 15 straight years from 1996 to 2012, with their best team finish in 2007, taking 4th place in the nation. Purdue has had two individual event National Champions with Cale Burdick winning the men's slalom national title in 2004 and again in 2006, his freshman and junior years respectively.

== Facilities ==
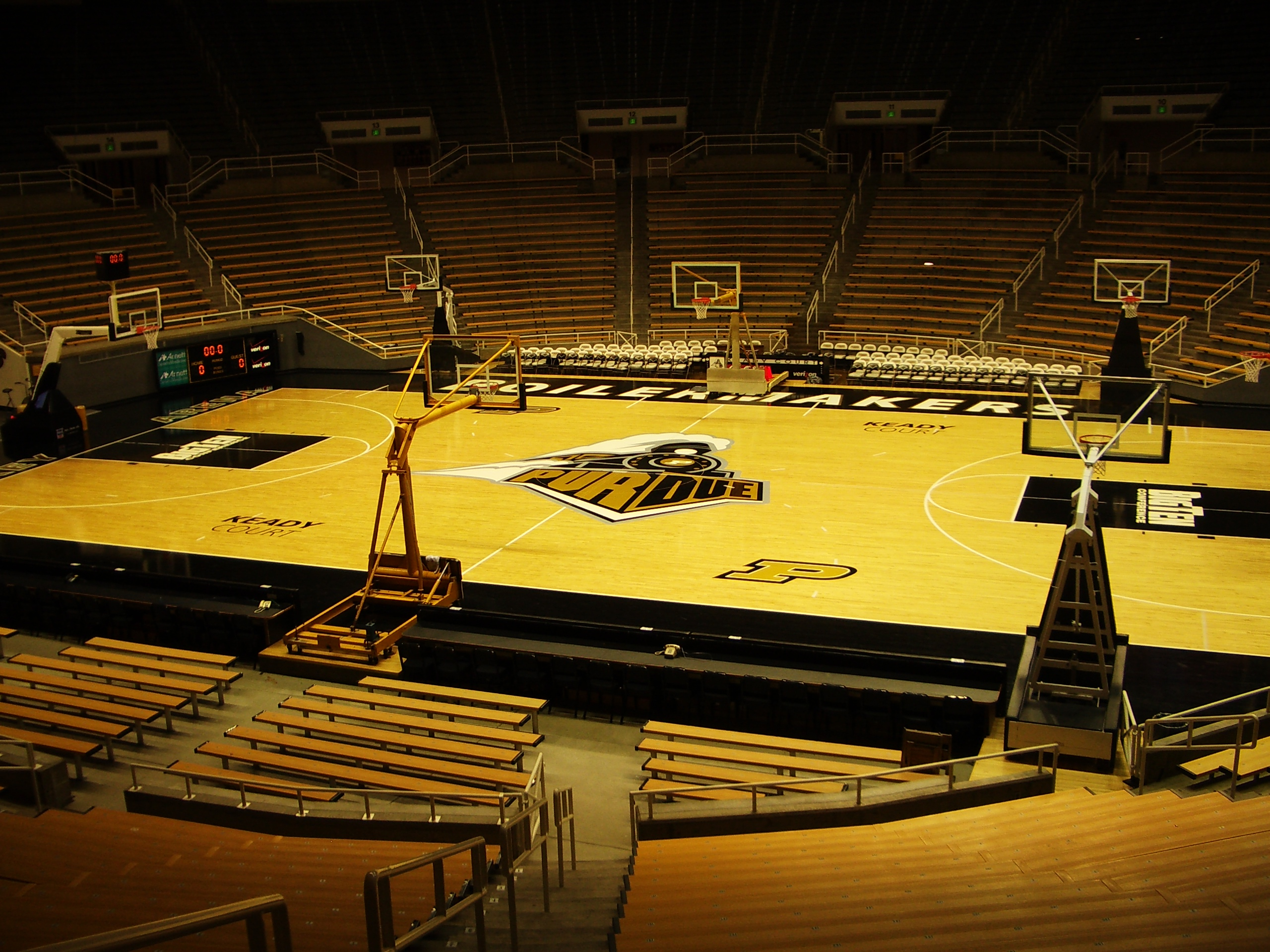
Mackey Arena

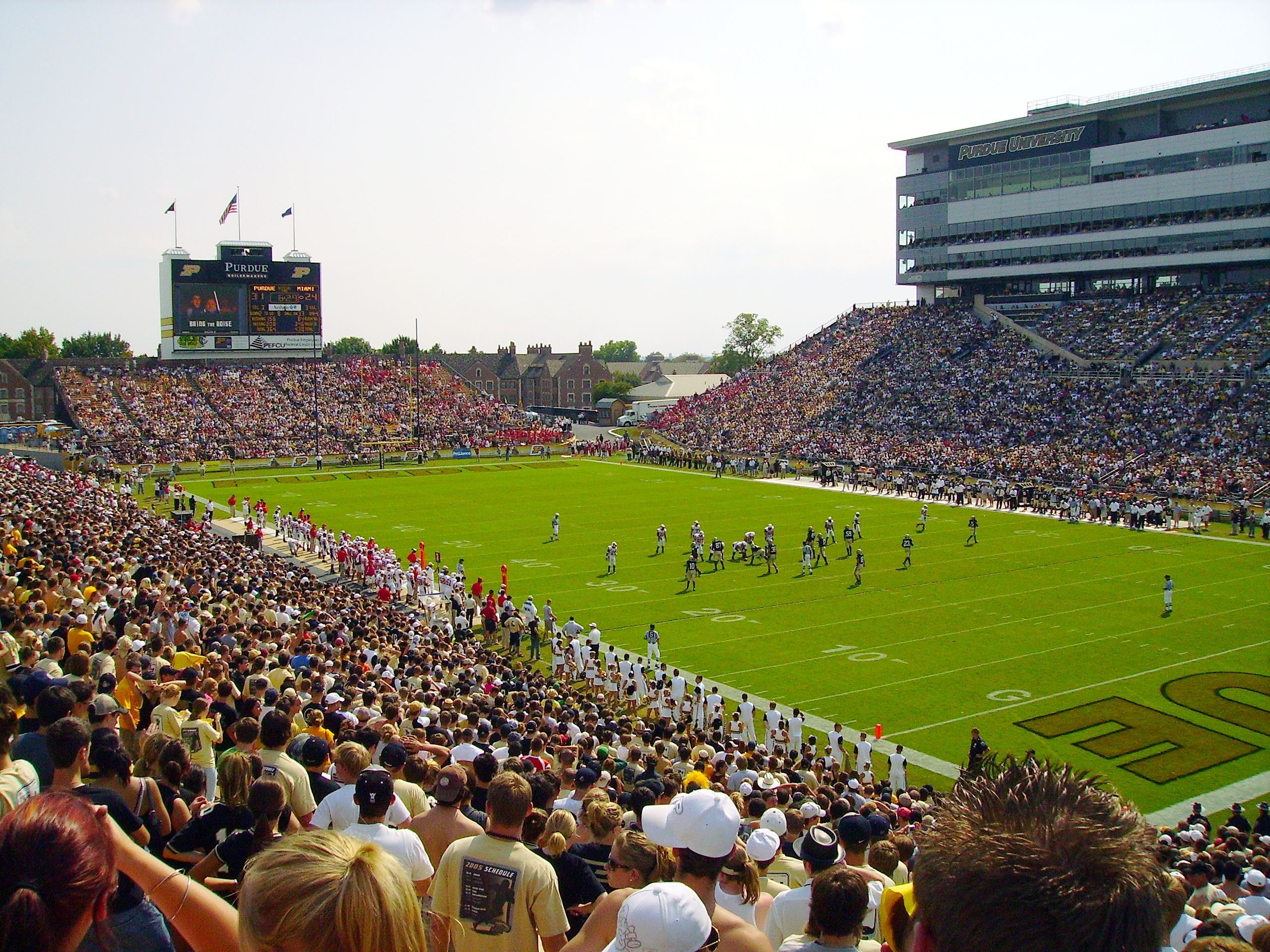
Ross-Ade Stadium

- Alexander Field – Baseball
- Birck Boilermaker Golf Complex – Men's and Women's Golf

The golf complex houses 2 distinct 18 hole courses, The Ackerman Hills Course and the Kampen Course. The golf complex also includes the Pete Dye Clubhouse, Tom Spurgeon Golf Training Center, short game areas and a driving range. The Kampen Course hosted the Women's NCAA golf championship in 2003 and the Men's NCAA championship in 2008.

- Boilermaker Cross Country Course – Men's and Women's Cross Country
- Boilermaker Softball Stadium – Softball
- Dennis J. and Mary Lou Schwartz Tennis Center – Men's and Women's Tennis

The facility is home to 12 outdoor and 6 indoor tennis courts.

- Folk Field – Women's Soccer
- Holloway Gymnasium – Volleyball, Wrestling

In addition to holding Belin Court as a dedicated surface for Volleyball and primary competition arena for Wrestling, the building is also the location of the Brees Academic Performance Center, home to several other athletic facilities. The Athletic Ticket Office, Jane P. Beering Academic Learning Center, and large weightroom are also inside the Brees building. Additionally, the football game day locker rooms are located in Brees.

- Lambert Fieldhouse – Men's and Women's Indoor Track

Originally home to the Boilermaker basketball team and the Boilermaker Swimming Team, the fieldhouse now is used solely by the Men's and Women's Track teams for indoor competitions. The pool has been filled in to make way for a training center for the wrestling team.

- Mackey Arena – Men's and Women's Basketball
- Mollenkopf Athletic Center – An indoor training facility used primarily for the football team. It includes a full practice football field, extensive weight room, and offices for the football program. Also housed in Mollenkopf is the Purdue Football Hall of Glory. Mollenkopf was expanded in 2017 with the addition of the Football Performance Complex. The expansion includes new team meeting and film rooms, new coach's offices, a state of the art weight room and new locker room.
- Morgan J. Burke Aquatic Center – Men's and Women's Diving, Men's and Women's Swimming

The Aquatic center was an addition to the Purdue Recreational Services Center in 2001. The aquatic center includes an Olympic sized pool, diving well, dressing facilities, hot tub, and spectator areas.

- Rankin Track & Field – Men's and Women's Outdoor Track and Field
- Ross–Ade Stadium – Football

== Rivalries ==
Purdue shares an all-sports rivalry with Indiana University Hoosiers, against whom the Purdue football team plays annually for the Old Oaken Bucket. The Purdue football team also competes against the Fighting Irish from the University of Notre Dame for the Shillelagh Trophy and the University of Illinois Fighting Illini for the Purdue Cannon trophy. They historically competed against the University of Chicago Maroons, but that rivalry ended when Chicago abolished its original football program in 1939.

== Athletic bands ==
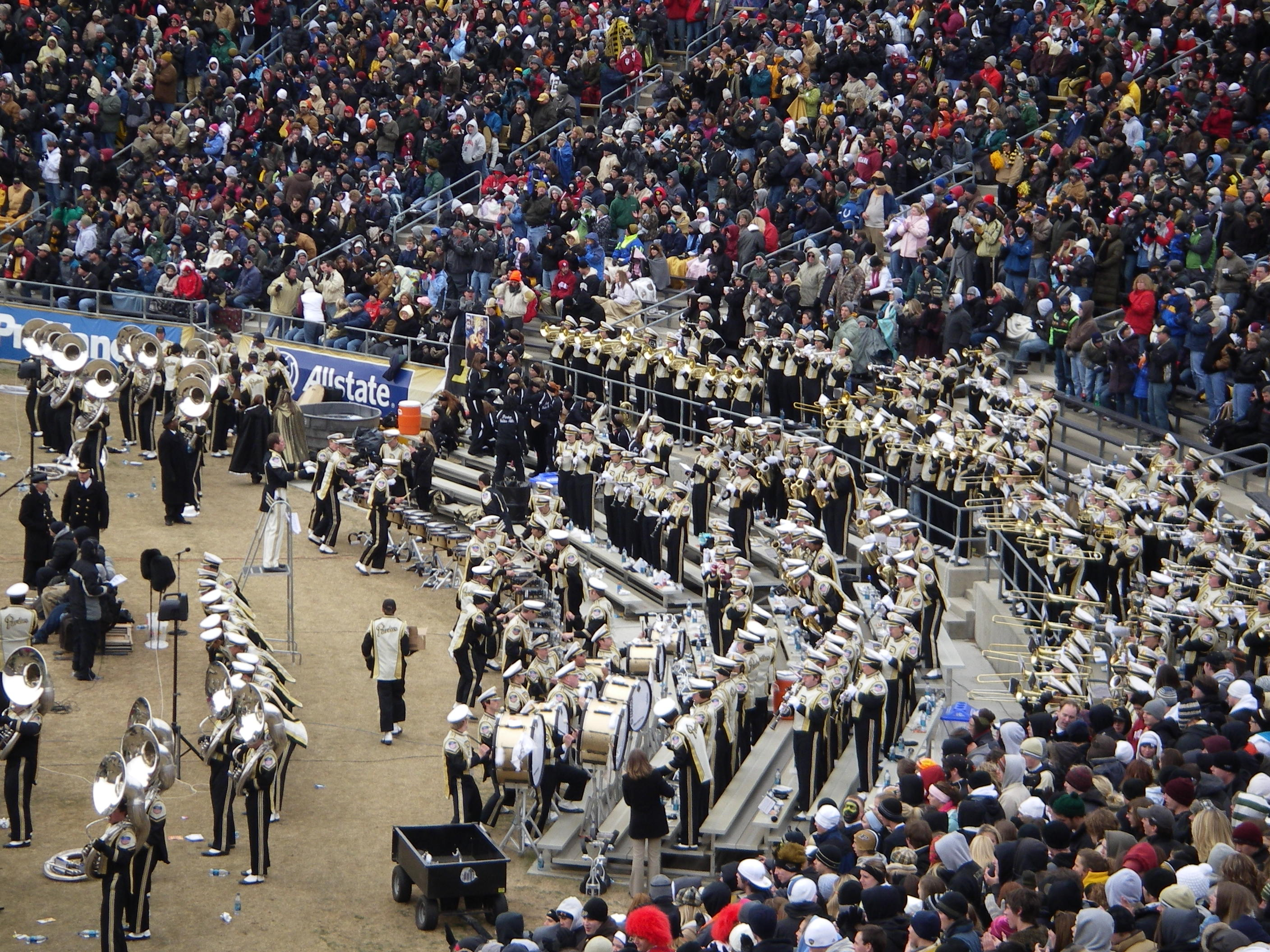
The Purdue All-American Marching Band perform Hail Purdue at the 2008 Purdue-Indiana football game.

Purdue's Band was formed in 1886 and named the 'All-American' Marching Band in 1935. The AAMB has made 99 consecutive appearances as the host band for the Indianapolis 500. The AAMB performs at all home football games where they play the university fight songs, Hail Purdue! being the most famous, and other songs ranging from jazz to rock.

Gold and Black Sound (GABS) is the athletic band for women's basketball. They are among the largest pep bands in the country, with more than 250 members.

Boiler Brass is the athletic band for men's basketball.

Boiler Box Band is the athletic band for the volleyball team.

== Mascots ==
=== Boilermaker Special ===
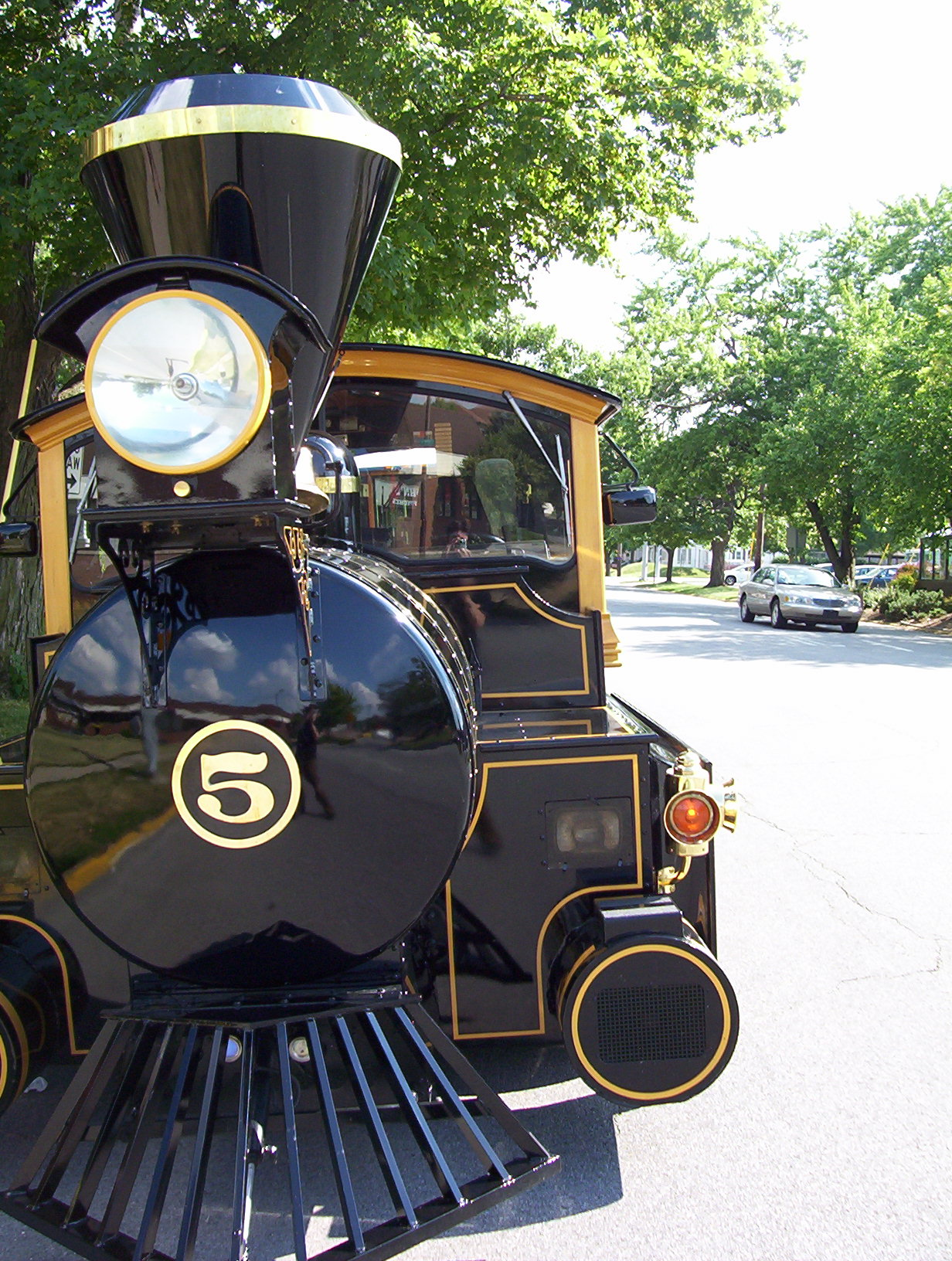
Boilermaker Special 5

The Boilermaker Special has been the official mascot of Purdue since the 1930s. The 'Specials' are Victorian era locomotives. The Boilermaker Special I made its debut on the first day of classes in 1940. Alumni, faculty and students have since then raised funds to replace the Special as it has worn out. The Boilermaker Special V was unveiled in 1993 at the Purdue–Notre Dame game.

=== Purdue Pete ===
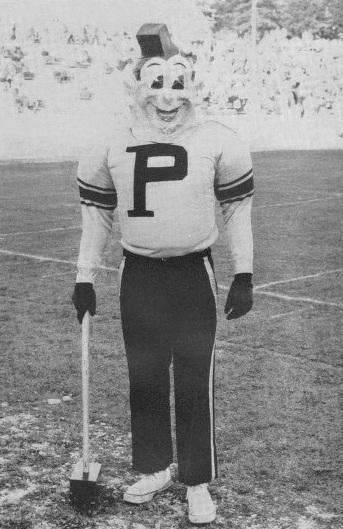
Purdue Pete, circa 1956

In 1940, the then owners of the University Bookstore, Doc Epple and Red Sammons, hired local artist Art Evans to draw a boilermaker to use as an advertising icon for the bookstore. A modernized version is still used in that capacity at University Bookstore. In 1944, the editors of the university's Debris yearbook sought, and obtained, permission from University Bookstore to use Purdue Pete on the cover of the 1944 edition of the Debris yearbook. When asked the name of the boilermaker depicted in the advertising drawing, Epple coined the name "Pete". Since 1956, Purdue Pete has been a regular at Purdue games – usually wearing the head with a football or basketball uniform and portrayed by one of four selected members of the spirit squad. Originally, the head costume was made of chicken wire and papier-mâché, but in later years has been made of fiberglass for better durability during rainy football games. Bradley-Bourbonnais Community High School in north-east Illinois also uses a mascot similar to Pete called "Bruno the Boilermaker".

=== The Boilermaker ===
The Boilermaker is a statue located adjacent to Ross Ade Stadium that was dedicated on Friday, November 4, 2005, as a monument commemorating the "indomitable spirit of the boilermaker".
