= 1960–61 Purdue Boilermakers men's golf team =

1960–61 Purdue Boilermakers men's golf

NCAA, National Champions
- Conference: Big Ten Conference
- Head coach: Sam Voinoff

The 1960–61 Purdue Boilermakers men's golf team represented Purdue University. The head coach was Sam Voinoff, then in his twelfth season with the Boilers. The team was a member of the Big Ten Conference. They finished fourth in the Big Ten Conference and went on to win the NCAA national championship.

== Roster ==
- Mark Darnell
- Jim Farlander
- Jerry Jackson
- Joe Kack
- Howard Klein
- Bill Templin
- John Thorington
- Steve Wilkinson
- Source

== Schedule ==
- Memphis State L, 24–12
- Vanderbilt W, 19–17
- Tennessee W, 20–7
- Louisville W, 26.5–9.5
- Ball State W, 25–11
- Quad Meet 1st, 912
- Northern Illinois W, 24–12
- Eastern Illinois W, 31.5–4.5
- Quad Meet 3rd, 467
- Quad Meet 1st, 917
- Notre Dame L, 18.5–17.5
- Ball State W, 25–11
- Indiana W, 23–13
- Indiana Intercollegiate, 1st of 4
- Big Ten Championships, 4th of 10
- NCAA Championships, 1st of 28
