= 1954–55 Purdue Boilermakers men's golf team =

1954–55 Purdue Boilermakers men's golf

Big Ten Conference Champions

NCAA, T–9th
- Conference: Big Ten Conference
- Head coach: Sam Voinoff

The 1954–55 Purdue Boilermakers men's golf team represented Purdue University. The head coach was Sam Voinoff, then in his sixth season with the Boilermakers. The team was a member of the Big Ten Conference. They won the Big Ten Conference championship and finished in a tie for ninth at the NCAA championships with SMU.

== Roster ==
- Don Albert
- Joe Campbell
- Wayne Etherton
- Don Granger
- Bob Krueger
- Ed McCallum
- Bill Redding
- Ron Pierce
- Tom Schaefer
- Source

== Schedule ==
- Tennessee W, 17–10
- Vanderbilt W, 21–15
- Tennessee W, 23.5–12.5
- Michigan State W, 28.5–7.5
- Detroit W, 30–6
- Ohio State W, 26.5–9.5
- Michigan L, 19–17
- Indiana W, 27–9
- Ohio State L, 26.5–9.5
- Michigan W, 27.5–8.5
- Illinois W, 30–18
- Ohio State W, 20–16
- Michigan W, 23.5–18.5
- Indiana W, 29–9
- Notre Dame W, 25–7
- Illinois W, 33.5–14.5
- Indiana W, 28.5–7.5
- Northwestern W, 29–7
- Wisconsin W, 23.5–12.5
- Big Ten Championships, 1st of 10
- NCAA Championships, T–9th of 33

== Big Ten Championship results ==
=== Team results ===
- May 1955 in Lafayette, Indiana
- 1. Purdue 1,141
- 2. Ohio State 1,147
- 3. Wisconsin 1,166
- 4. Michigan 1,170
- 5. Minnesota 1,191
- 6. Iowa 1,192
- 7. Michigan State 1,204
- 8. Illinois 1,205
- 9. Northwestern 1,209
- 10. Indiana 1,213

=== Individual results ===
The championship was shortened for the first time ever from 72 holes to 54 as a result of storms.

Player	1st	2nd	3rd	Total
Joe Campbell	73	75	72	220
Wayne Etherton	78	75	75	228
Tom Schafer	79	76	73	228
Bill Redding	76	78	78	232
Ed McCallum	76	73	84	233
Don Albert	79	83	81	243

The top five player scores counted towards the championship.
