= 1959 NCAA golf championship =

American golf tournament

1959 NCAA Golf Championship
Tournament information
- Location: Eugene, Oregon, U.S. 44.064°N 123.087°W
- Course: Eugene Country Club

Statistics
- Field: 20 teams

Champion
- Team: Houston (4th title); Individual: Dick Crawford, Houston

Location map
- Location in the United States Location in Oregon

The 1959 NCAA Golf Championship was the 21st annual NCAA-sanctioned golf tournament to determine the individual and team national champions of men's collegiate golf in the United States.

The tournament was held at Eugene Country Club in Eugene, Oregon, hosted by the University of Oregon.

Three-time defending champions Houston won the team title, the Cougars' fourth NCAA team national title.

== Individual results ==
=== Individual champion ===
- Dick Crawford, Houston

=== Tournament medalists ===
- Bob Pratt, Houston (136)
- Jacky Cupit, Houston (136)

== Team results ==
Rank	Team	Score
1	Houston (DC)	561
2	Purdue	571
3	Stanford	573
4	Oregon	574
5	Oklahoma State	579
6	Seattle	581
T7	Florida	586
T7	Texas Tech	586
9	Rollins	587
10	Duke	592

- Note: Top 10 only
- DC = Defending champions
