= 1921 Big Ten Conference Men's Golf Championship =

Tournament information
- Dates: 1921
- Course: Indian Hills

Statistics
- Field: 5 schools

Champion
- Team: Drake; Individual: Robert McKee, Drake

The 1921 Big Ten Conference Men's Golf Championship was held in 1921 at Indian Hills. The team champion was Drake with a score of 684. It was also the first year of 36-hole medal play with the top four individual scores from each school counting towards the championship.

== Team results ==
Place	Team	Score
1	Drake	684
2	Chicago	698
T3	Illinois	709
T3	Northwestern	709
5	Lewis Institute	755
