= 2001–02 Purdue Boilermakers men's golf team =

2001–02 Purdue Boilermakers men's golf

NCAA Championship, 7th
- Conference: Big Ten Conference
- Head coach: Devon Brouse (4th season)

The 2001–02 Purdue Boilermakers men's golf team represented Purdue University. The head coach was Devon Brouse, then in his fourth season with the Boilers. The team was a member of the Big Ten Conference. They finished third in the Big Ten Conference and went on place seventh in the NCAA national championship.

== Roster ==
- Ryan Barauskas, Plano, TX
- Jason Bukowski, Senior, Austin, IN
- Dustin Cone, Freshman, Bennington, VT
- Shiv Kapur, Sophomore, New Delhi, India
- Peter Karmis, Junior, Simon's Town, South Africa
- Chris Mayson, Junior, Milton Keynes, England
- Lee Williamson, Senior, Crawfordsville, IN

== Schedule ==
2001–02 Purdue Men's Golf Schedule
Dates	Name	Location	Finish	Teams	Score
Sept. 8–9	Badger Invitational	Madison, WI	3rd	15	293-281-291=865
Oct. 8–9	Purina Classic at Missouri Bluffs	St. Louis, MO	3rd	15	295-281-285=861
Oct. 26–28	The Nelson Invitational	Palo Alto, CA	7th	15	280-288-291=859
Nov. 9–11	Long Cove Invitational	Hilton Head, SC	12th	15	293-305-296=894
Feb. 9–10	Gator Invitational	Gainesville, FL	T-2nd	15	292-285-270=847
Feb. 24–26	Puerto Rico Classic	Rio Grande, Puerto Rico	3rd	15	293-278-286=857
Mar. 15–17	Conrad Rehling Invitational	Tuscaloosa, AL	10th	14	293-299-282=874
Mar. 29–30	Johnny Owens Invitational	Lexington, KY	1st	18	294-285-278=857
Apr. 12–13	Robert Kepler Intercollegiate	Columbus, OH	3rd	17	293-289=582
May 3–5	Big Ten Championships	Iowa City, IA	3rd	11	279-289-293-296=1,157
May 16–18	NCAA Central Regional	Little Rock, AR	T-1st	26	290-279-296=865
May 29–June 1	NCAA Championships	Columbus, OH	7th	30	284-287-293-281=1,145
