= 1920 Big Ten Conference Men's Golf Championship =

Tournament information
- Dates: October 22–23, 1920
- Location: Olympia Fields, Illinois
- Course: Olympia Fields Country Club

Statistics
- Field: 7 schools

Champion
- Team: Drake; Individual: Rudolph Knepper, Chicago

The 1920 Big Ten Conference Men's Golf Championship was held October 22–23, 1920 at the Olympia Fields Country Club in Olympia Fields, Illinois. The team champion was Drake with a match play score of 28 down.

== Team results ==
- 72 holes of match play was used to determine the team champion.

Place	Team	Score
1	Drake	28 down
2	Chicago	37 down
T3	Ohio State	70 down
T3	Illinois	70 down
5	Michigan	73 down
6	Northwestern	81 down
7	Wisconsin	85 down
