= Daniel Svärd (golfer) =

Swedish professional golfer (born 2003)

Personal information
- Nationality: Sweden
- Born: 7 February 2003 (age 23) Järfalla, Stockholm County, Sweden
- Height: 6 ft 5 in (1.96 m)
- Weight: 181 lb (82 kg)

Career
- Sport: Golf
- College: Northwestern University
- Turned professional: 2026
- Current tour: PGA Tour Americas
- Professional wins: 1

Achievements and awards
- Annika Sörenstam Trophy: 2020
- Big Ten Freshman of the Year: 2023

Daniel Svärd (born 7 February 2003) is a Swedish professional golfer. He won the 2024 European Amateur Team Championship, and the 2021 Jacques Léglise Trophy with the continental European team.

== Early life ==
Svärd was born in 2003 and is attached to Viksjö Golf Club in his native Järfälla Municipality. He was educated at the Celsius School in Uppsala.

== Amateur career ==
In 2020, Svärd won the Swedish Junior Strokeplay Championship, a stroke ahead of William Wistrand, and topped the Swedish Teen Tour Order of Merit, earning the Annika Sörenstam Trophy. In 2021, he was selected to represent Europe in the Jacques Léglise Trophy, in which the Europeans prevailed 16 1/2 to 8 1/2 over the British at Falsterbo Golf Club, Sweden. He secured two points in foursomes paired with Tim Wiedemeyer.

Svärd joined the National Team in 2021. He won bronze in the 2021 European Boys' Team Championship in Denmark after Sweden lost the semi-final to Germany 3–4, where he beat Tim Wiedemeyer, 2 and 1. He secured gold for Sweden at the 2024 European Amateur Team Championship in Italy after he won his Sunday singles match against Benjamin Reuter, 2 and 1, for a score of 3–2 in the final against the Netherlands.

== College career ==
Svärd enrolled at Northwestern University in 2022 as an economics major and started playing with the Northwestern Wildcats men's golf team.

He earned Big Ten Conference Freshman of the Year honors and won the Big Ten Championship both as a freshman and sophomore, joining only Luke Donald and Sid Richardson as two-time individual conference champions for the Wildcats.

== Professional career ==
Svärd placed 19th in the final 2026 PGA Tour University rankings and earned membership of the PGA Tour Americas for the remainder of the 2026 season.

He made his professional debut at the Explore NB Open in New Brunswick, Canada, where he shot an opening round 64. In his fourth start, he won the Manitoba Open with a par on the first playoff hole.

== Amateur wins ==
- 2018 Teen Tour Future #5
- 2019 Teen Tour Future #3, Carin Koch Junior Open, Swedish Junior Classics, Teen Tour Future #5, Evolve Spanish Junior Championship
- 2020 Swedish Panoramica Open, Swedish Junior Strokeplay Championship
- 2021 Swedish Junior Classics
- 2023 Big Ten Championship
- 2024 Big Ten Championship
- 2025 The Goodwin

== Professional wins (1) ==
=== PGA Tour Americas wins (1) ===
No.	Date	Tournament	Winning score	Margin of victory	Runner-up
1	23 Aug 2026	Manitoba Open	−14 (67-65-64-70=266)	Playoff	(United States) Adam Duncan

== Team appearances ==
Amateur

- European Boys' Team Championship (representing Sweden): 2021
- Jacques Léglise Trophy (representing Continental Europe): 2021 (winners)
- Eisenhower Trophy (representing Europe): 2023
- European Amateur Team Championship (representing Sweden): 2023, 2024 (winners), 2025
