= 1955–56 Purdue Boilermakers men's golf team =

1955–56 Purdue Boilermakers men's golf

Big Ten conference Champions

NCAA, T–2nd
- Conference: Big Ten Conference
- Head coach: Sam Voinoff

The 1955–56 Purdue Boilermakers men's golf team represented Purdue University. The head coach was Sam Voinoff, then in his seventh season with the Boilermakers. The team was a member of the Big Ten Conference. They won the Big Ten Conference championship and finished in a tie for second at the NCAA championships with North Texas. The co-captains of the team were Ed McCallum and Wayne Etherton.

== Roster ==
Name	Year	High school	Hometown
Joe Campbell	Junior	Anderson High School	Anderson, Indiana
Art Lemon			
Bill Redding	Junior		Logansport, Indiana
Wayne Etherton	Senior		
Ed "Eddie" McCallum	Senior	Crawfordsville High School	Crawfordsville, Indiana
Tom Shaffer	Junior		
Don Granger	Junior	Anderson High School	Anderson, Indiana

- Source

== Schedule ==
- Tennessee W, 17–10
- Tennessee W, 15.5–11.5
- Vanderbilt W, 15.5–11.5
- Illinois W, 28–8
- Michigan State W, 24–12
- Detroit W, 34.5–1.5
- Indiana W, 27.5–8.5
- Notre Dame W, 29.5–6.5
- Ohio State L, 27.5–14.5
- Michigan L, 21.5–14.5
- Indiana W, 29.5–6.5
- Michigan W, 23–19
- Ohio State L, 23–13
- Northwestern W, 28.5–7.5
- Ohio State W, 29–7
- Michigan W, 19.5–6.5
- Notre Dame W, 25–11
- Detroit W, 33–3
- Wisconsin W, 24–12
- Northwestern W, 29.5–9.5
- Illinois W, 24–12
- Indiana W, 29.5–9.5
- Big Ten Championships, 1st of 10
- NCAA Championships, T–2nd of 31

== Big Ten Championship results ==
=== Team results ===
- May 25–26, 1956 in Wilmette, Illinois and Northwestern was the host school.
- 1. Purdue 1,501
- 2. Michigan 1,508
- 3. Ohio State 1,509
- 4. Wisconsin 1,520
- 5. Northwestern 1,526
- 6. Illinois 1,549
- Michigan State 1,549
- Minnesota 1,549
- 9. Iowa 1,569
- 10. Indiana 1,590

=== Individual results ===
Joe Campbell won the Big Ten Conference individual title.

Player	1st	2nd	3rd	4th	Total
Joe Campbell	71	72	67	71	281
Bill Redding	76	74	77	75	303
Wayne Etherton	74	73	76	81	304
Tom Schafer	77	72	75	85	305
Don Granger	81	73	78	76	308
Ed McCallum	83	80	81	74	318

The top five player scores counted towards the championship.
