= University Ridge Golf Course =

Golf course in Wisconsin, United States

- Location within the United States Location within Wisconsin
- 43.023°N 89.545°W

Club information
- Location: Verona and Madison, Wisconsin, U.S.
- Elevation: 1,130 feet (340 m)
- Established: 1991; 35 years ago
- Type: Public
- Tota holes: 18
- Tournaments: American Family Insurance Championship (2016–)
- Greens: 007 Bentgrass
- Fairways: Bentgrass / Poa annua
- Website: universityridge.com

University Ridge Golf Course
- Designed by: Robert Trent Jones, Jr.
- Par: 72
- Length: 7,259 yards (6,638 m)
- Course rating: 74.9
- Slope rating: 144

University Ridge Golf Course is a public golf course in the central United States, located in Verona and Madison, Wisconsin. It is the home course to both the men's and women's golf teams for the University of Wisconsin. Also, since 1994, it has been home to both the boys' and girls' WIAA state golf championships for all divisions. Beginning in 2016, Steve Stricker, a Wisconsin native, has hosted an event on the PGA Tour Champions every June at University Ridge. The Thomas Zimmer Championship Cross Country Course is also located on the property.

== History ==
University Ridge was designed to be the home course of the men's and women's golf teams for the University of Wisconsin. Southwest of campus, the course was designed by Robert Trent Jones, Jr. and opened in 1991. In 1994, it also became home to both the boys' and girls' WIAA state golf championships for all divisions.

Through 2008, the black tees (then the gold tees), measured only 6,888 yards (6,298 m). Other than holes 1, 8, 13, and 18, all holes had new tee boxes built for the then gold tees. In many cases when the holes were extended, the blue tees were moved to where the former gold tees were, and the white tees moved to where the blue tees used to stand. In fact, the blue tees used to measure 6,429 yards (5,879 m), and the white tees were 5,853 yards (5,352 m), while the red tees have remained constant.

In 2012, University Ridge began its "20-Year Tune Up" project in August. All eighteen greens were burned and resurfaced, which temporarily closed the course, but the practice facility remained open during the project.

A result of the Tune Up was the addition of a new set of tees; the green tees are set up between the blue and white tees.

On June 1, 2015, PGA Tour player and Wisconsin native Steve Stricker announced that he will be hosting the American Family Insurance Championship in 2016, a new event on the PGA Tour Champions, in late June at University Ridge. The first two days were a pro-am event, followed by the 54-hole event on Friday through Sunday, without a cut. Kirk Triplett was the event's inaugural winner in 2016; Fred Couples and Scott McCarron won in 2017 and 2018 respectively.

== Golf course ==
The front nine is in a more open space with minimal trees, while the back nine is much more forested. Holes 10 through 15 are surrounded by trees, while holes 16 through 18 have trees, but not on all sides.

=== Scorecard ===
University Ridge Golf Course
Tee	Rating/Slope	1	2	3	4	5	6	7	8	9	Out	10	11	12	13	14	15	16	17	18	In	Total
Black	75.8 / 142	396	555	242	467	198	623	429	207	587	3704	483	569	200	336	398	352	554	250	440	3582	7286
Blue	73.4 / 139	376	546	195	398	172	608	379	162	554	3390	456	537	174	330	377	321	533	192	408	3328	6718
Green	70.4 / 134	370	515	174	354	169	570	345	151	475	3123	424	504	159	316	358	312	514	164	371	3122	6245
White	68.6 / 129	355	461	170	332	140	534	325	144	442	2903	375	462	124	294	322	280	471	155	366	2849	5752
Red	65.3 / 116	293	428	135	304	126	442	298	83	421	2530	342	412	95	222	309	245	434	130	286	2475	5005
Par		4	5	3	4	3	5	4	3	5	36	4	5	3	4	4	4	5	3	4	36	72
SI		11	7	13	1	15	3	9	17	5		6	8	18	12	10	16	4	14	2

=== Course tour ===
The first hole at University Ridge (named Verona) is a par 4 that measures 396 yards from the back tees. A relatively easy opening hole, the tee shot plays from a slightly elevated tee. The green is protected on the right side by a relatively deep bunker.

The second hole (named ZigZag) is a risk-reward par 5 playing to 555 yards. A carry over a rocky creek and bunkers leaves players with a great chance of reaching the green in two. The safe play is to the wider part of the fairway, followed by a layup, and then a downhill approach over a depression to a small green, protected by numerous bunkers and a large tree short left.

The third hole (Floodplain) is a long, downhill par 3, coming in at 242 yards. This large green is fronted by a deep bunker, leaving for a difficult up and down.

The fourth hole (Morse Pond) is one of the most demanding holes at University Ridge. This par 4 that plays 467 yards requires a carryover Morse Pond off of the tee. On the uphill approach to the long narrow green, a collection of deep bunkers short right of the green must be taken into account.

The fifth hole (Noer's View) is a par 3 playing to 198 yards. The tee shot on this hole plays over a ravine to a green surrounded by 5 bunkers.

The sixth hole (Kettle Pond) is another one of the most demanding holes on the course. This par 5 measures 623 yards from the back tees, making it the longest hole on the golf course. The tee shot plays over Kettle Pond. After laying up, players must avoid a deep bunker short and left of the green. This leaves players with a very difficult up and down. A bunker sits to the right of the green as well.

The seventh hole (Drumlin) plays to 429 yards. This par 4 is a dogleg left to an elevated green. On the uphill approach, players must account for 5 bunkers to the right and long of the green.

The eighth hole (On the Rocks) is a downhill par 3 that measures 207 yards. The large green is fronted by a rocky creek.

The ninth hole (Hedgerow) is an uphill, double dogleg par 5 playing to 587 yards from the back tees. The landing area is protected on the left side by a row of trees and on the right by 3 large bunkers. The fairway then doglegs left, as well as slightly uphill. The hole finally doglegs right. The elevated green has a long bunker left, and a deep bunker right.

The front nine plays to 3,704 yards (3,387 m) from the back tees.

The tenth hole (Elm Valley) is a long, difficult par 4. This hole plays to 483 yards from the back tees. Unlike the front nine, the next six holes play through a thick hardwood forest. After a tee shot from the elevated tee, players must negotiate with difficult bunkers on both sides of this long, narrow, two-tiered green.

The eleventh hole (Ridgeline) is an uphill par 5. Again, surrounded by trees, this dogleg right measures 569 yards. To the right of the landing area are deep bunkers. The green is surrounded by numerous bunkers, making for an accurate approach.

The twelfth hole (Dropshot) is a significantly downhill par 3, playing 200 yards from the back tees. The green is surrounded by 2 bunkers, both of which make for difficult up and downs.

The thirteenth hole (Halfpipe) is a short, but uphill, par 4, coming in at only 336 yards. In front of this large green is a large bunker, catching any shot coming in short.

The fourteenth hole (Hickory Hill) is a par 4 playing to 398 yards. A collection of bunkers surrounding the green demands an accurate approach.

The fifteenth hole (Lone Elm) is another short par 4, this one being 352 yards. On this dogleg right, longer hitters may attempt to cut off the dogleg and try to drive the green. However, a large elm tree between the tee and green will make many players think twice. A number of bunkers around the green require players to hit an accurate, slightly downhill, approach.

The sixteenth hole (Bunkered) is another risk-reward par 5. University Ridge's signature hole measures 554 yards from the back tees and begins a great three-hole finishing stretch. Players have two options off of the tee: play it safe down the left fairway or play down a line of trees to the right fairway, in hopes of reaching the green in two. This hole contains a total of 16 bunkers, making for accurate shots from tee to green.

The seventeenth hole (Reflections) is an extremely difficult par 3. This hole measures 250 yards from the back tees, the longest par 3 on the course. The tee shot plays over a pond to a narrow green. A bunker right of the green makes for an even more accurate tee shot, leaving nearly no place to put the ball except for the center of the green.

The eighteenth hole at University Ridge (Capitol Climb) is an uphill dogleg left par 4. This hole, which measures 440 yards from the back tees, is flanked by trees all along its right side, as well as thick grass to the left. A total of 3 bunkers borders the left side of the landing zone, giving players a difficult tee shot. On the uphill approach to the large green, players must account for a drop off left, as well as a large bunker right. The final three holes at University Ridge provide a great finish to a great round on a championship caliber golf course.

The back nine measures 3,582 yards (3,275 m) from the back tees.

From the back tees, University Ridge measures 7,286 yards (6,662 m), with a course rating of 75.8 and a slope rating of 142.
