= Ab Justice =

American professional golfer

Donald Max "Ab" Justice (January 23, 1934 – October 7, 2013) was an American professional golfer.

== Career ==
Justice played college at Oklahoma State University, where he was the school's first All-American. He enjoyed a brief stint on the PGA Tour, and was the club pro at various golf courses in Oklahoma and Kansas.

He died in 2013, aged 79.
