= 1961 NCAA golf championship =

1961 NCAA Division I Men's Golf Championship
Tournament information
- Dates: 1961
- Location: Lafayette, Indiana, U.S. 40.441944°N 86.9125°W
- Courses: Purdue University Golf Course (Purdue University)

Statistics
- Par: 71
- Field: 28 teams

Champion
- Team: Purdue; Individual: Jack Nicklaus, Ohio State
- Team: 584 (+16)

Location map
- Location in the United States Location in Indiana

The 1961 NCAA Golf Championship was the 23rd annual tournament to determine the national champions of NCAA men's collegiate golf.

It was contested in 1961 at the Purdue University Golf Course in Lafayette, Indiana.

Host team Purdue won the team title and Jack Nicklaus from Ohio State won the individual title over Purdue's Mark Darnell.

== Team competition ==
=== Leaderboard ===
Place	Team	Total
1	Purdue	584
2	Arizona State	595
3	Southern California	596
4	Oklahoma State	597
5	Texas A&M	602
6	Michigan State	603
