= 1956 NCAA golf championship =

1956 NCAA Golf Championship
Tournament information
- Dates: June 24–30, 1956
- Location: Columbus, Ohio, U.S. 40.031886°N 83.0523498°W
- Courses: Ohio State University Golf Club (Ohio State University)

Statistics
- Field: 31 teams

Champion
- Team: Houston; Individual: Rick Jones, Ohio State
- Team: 601

Location map
- Location in the United States Location in Ohio

The 1956 NCAA Men's Golf Championship was the 18th annual tournament to determine the national champions of NCAA men's collegiate golf.

The tournament was held at the Ohio State University Golf Club in Columbus, Ohio.

Houston won the team title and Rick Jones from Ohio State won the individual title over Houston's Rex Baxter Jr.

== Team competition ==
=== Leaderboard ===
Place	Team	Total
1	Houston	601
T2	Purdue	602
T2	West Texas State	602
4	Oklahoma A&M	605
5	Florida State	606
6	Notre Dame	607
