= 1955 Big Ten Conference Men's Golf Championship =

Tournament information
- Dates: May 27–28, 1955
- Location: Lafayette, Indiana
- Course: Purdue Golf Course (South)

Statistics
- Par: 71
- Length: 6,392 yards (5,845 m)
- Field: 10 schools, 60 players

Champion
- Team: Purdue; Individual: Roger Rubendall, Wisconsin

The 1955 Big Ten Conference Men's Golf Championship was held on May 27–28, 1955 at the Purdue Golf Course (South) in Lafayette, Indiana. The team champion was Purdue with a score of 1,141 and the individual champion was Roger Rubendall of Wisconsin who shot a 216.

== Team results ==
Place	Team	Score
1	Purdue	1,141
2	Ohio State	1,147
3	Wisconsin	1,166
4	Michigan	1,170
5	Minnesota	1,191
6	Iowa	1,192
7	Michigan State	1,204
8	Illinois	1,205
9	Northwestern	1,209
10	Indiana	1,213

== Individual results ==
The championship was shortened for the first time ever from 72 holes to 54 as a result of storms canceling a morning round on Saturday.

=== Purdue ===
Player	1st	2nd	3rd	Total
Joe Campbell	73	75	72	220
Wayne Etherton	78	75	75	228
Tom Schafer	79	76	73	228
Bill Redding	76	78	78	232
Ed McCallum	76	73	84	233
Don Albert	79	83	81	243

=== Ohio State ===
Player	1st	2nd	3rd	Total
Francis Cardi	74	72	77	223
Francis Schmidt	77	74	75	226
Fred Jones	76	75	78	229
Larry Harper	77	77	77	231
Larry Munsie	80	79	79	238
Jim Ross	81	79	86	246

=== Wisconsin ===
Player	1st	2nd	3rd	Total
Roger Rubendall	72	71	73	216
James McDonald	77	80	76	233
David Forbes	81	72	81	234
Paul Kaste	77	83	79	239
Martin Rammer	79	79	86	244
Peter Angelbeck	75	88	86	249

=== Michigan ===
Player	1st	2nd	3rd	Total
Steve Uzelac	77	74	76	227
Fred Micklow	77	78	74	229
Henry S. Loeb	77	76	81	234
Rob McMasters	73	79	85	237
Harold P. Andrews	80	81	82	243
John Schubeck	78	85	82	245

=== Minnesota ===
Player	1st	2nd	3rd	Total
Ted Vickerman	75	80	79	234
Norbert Anderson	80	76	79	235
Donald Dosen	78	82	79	239
Herbert Howe	81	76	84	241
Robert Nordstrom	85	77	80	242
James Lucius	81	79	83	243

=== Iowa ===
Player	1st	2nd	3rd	Total
Herbert Klontz	79	79	73	231
Edmund A. McCardell	86	75	74	235
Jack Sutton	79	78	82	239
John Marschall	76	83	81	240
Robert A. Rasley	83	81	83	247
Tom Davis	86	85	81	252

=== Michigan State ===
Player	1st	2nd	3rd	Total
Jim Sullivan	82	76	76	234
James Raymond	78	82	78	238
Martin A. Hurd	79	78	84	241
Robert J. Nodus	83	82	79	244
Lanny L. Johnson	85	88	74	247
John E. Steimle	77	84	87	248

=== Illinois ===
Scores don't add up to 1,205.

Player	1st	2nd	3rd	Total
Byron Connell	80	73	76	229
Robert Reitsch	80	78	83	241
Henry J. Foley	86	80	78	244
Byron Kenneth West	80	83	81	244
Roger Mueller	82	81	82	245
Richard Davies	86	87	89	262

=== Northwestern ===
Player	1st	2nd	3rd	Total
Rudy Boyd	76	78	79	233
Howie W.	81	76	80	237
Tull M.	82	79	77	238
Arthur Baller	86	83	81	250
Dick Aultman	81	87	83	251
John (unknown)	86	80	85	251

=== Indiana ===
Player	1st	2nd	3rd	Total
Richard Cardwell	78	75	83	236
Donald R. Schieve	77	79	82	238
James F. Balch	83	79	82	244
Richard Williams	77	84	86	247
Robert W. Dyar	84	84	80	248
Philip (unknown)	85	82	86	253

The top five player scores counted towards the championship.

== Round summaries ==
The 1955 Big Ten Championship was played over two days with two 18-hole rounds played on the first day and an 18-hole round played on the final day, for a total of 54 holes.

=== First round ===
Friday, May 27, 1955

Place	Player	School	Score	To par
1	Roger Rubendall	Wisconsin	72	+1
T2	Joe Campbell	Purdue	73	+2
T2	Rob McMasters	Michigan	73	+2
4	Francis Cardi	Ohio State	74	+3
T5	Peter Angelbeck	Wisconsin	75	+4
T5	Ted Vickerman	Minnesota	75	+4
T7	Ed McCallum	Purdue	76	+5
T7	Bill Redding	Purdue	76	+5
T7	Fred Jones	Ohio State	76	+5
T7	John Marschall	Iowa	76	+5
T7	Rudy Boyd	Northwestern	76	+5
T12	Francis Schmidt	Ohio State	77	+6
T12	Larry Harper	Ohio State	77	+6
T12	James McDonald	Wisconsin	77	+6
T12	Paul Kaste	Iowa	77	+6
T12	Steve Uzelac	Michigan	77	+6
T12	Fred Micklow	Michigan	77	+6
T12	Henry S. Loeb	Michigan	77	+6
T12	John E. Steimle	Michigan State	77	+6
T12	Donald R. Schieve	Indiana	77	+6
T12	Richard Williams	Indiana	77	+6

=== Second round ===
Friday, May 27, 1955

Place	Player	School	Score	To par
1	Roger Rubendall	Wisconsin	72-71=143	+1
2	Francis Cardi	Ohio State	74-72=146	+4
3	Joe Campbell	Purdue	73-75=148	+6
4	Ed McCallum	Purdue	76-73=149	+7
T5	Francis Schmidt	Ohio State	77-74=151	+9
T5	Fred Jones	Ohio State	76-75=151	+9
T5	Steve Uzelac	Michigan	77-74=151	+9
8	Rob McMasters	Michigan	73-79=152	+10
T9	Wayne Etherton	Purdue	78-75=153	+11
T9	David Forbes	Wisconsin	81-72=153	+11
T9	Henry S. Loeb	Michigan	77-74=153	+11
T9	Byron Connell	Illinois	80-73=153	+11
T9	Richard Cardwell	Indiana	78-75=153	+11
T14	Bill Redding	Purdue	76-78=154	+12
T14	Larry Harper	Ohio State	77-77=154	+12
T14	Rudy Boyd	Northwestern	76-78=154	+12

=== Final round ===
Saturday, May 28, 1955

Place	Player	School	Score	To par
1	Roger Rubendall	Wisconsin	72-71-73=216	+3
2	Joe Campbell	Purdue	73-75-72=220	+7
3	Francis Cardi	Ohio State	74-72-77=223	+10
4	Francis Schmidt	Ohio State	77-74-75=226	+13
5	Steve Uzelac	Michigan	77-74-76=227	+14
T6	Wayne Etherton	Purdue	78-75-75=228	+15
T6	Tom Schafer	Purdue	79-76-73=228	+15
T8	Byron Connell	Illinois	80-73-76=229	+16
T8	Fred Micklow	Michigan	77-78-74=229	+16
T8	Fred Jones	Ohio State	76-75-78=229	+16
T11	Herbert Klontz	Iowa	79-79-73=231	+18
T11	Larry Harper	Ohio State	77-77-77=231	+18
13	Bill Redding	Purdue	76-78-78=232	+19
T14	Ed McCallum	Purdue	76-73-84=233	+20
T14	James McDonald	Wisconsin	77-80-76=233	+20
T14	Rudy Boyd	Northwestern	76-78-79=233	+20
