= 1956 Big Ten Conference Men's Golf Championship =

Tournament information
- Dates: May 25–26, 1956
- Location: Wilmette, Illinois

Statistics
- Par: 71
- Field: 10 schools, 60 players

Champion
- Team: Purdue; Individual: Joe Campbell, Purdue

The 1956 Big Ten Conference Men's Golf Championship was held on May 25–26, 1956 in Wilmette, Illinois and Northwestern was the host school. The team champion was Purdue with a score of 1,501 and the individual champion was Joe Campbell of Purdue who shot a 281.

== Team results ==
Place	School	Score
1	Purdue	1,501
2	Michigan	1,508
3	Ohio State	1,509
4	Wisconsin	1,520
5	Northwestern	1,526
T6	Illinois	1,549
T6	Michigan State	1,549
T6	Minnesota	1,549
9	Iowa	1,569
10	Indiana	1,590

== Individual results ==
=== Purdue ===
Joe Campbell won the Big Ten Conference individual title.

Player	1st	2nd	3rd	4th	Total
Joe Campbell	71	72	67	71	281
Bill Redding	76	74	77	75	303
Wayne Etherton	74	73	76	81	304
Tom Schafer	77	72	75	85	305
Don Granger	81	73	78	76	308
Ed McCallum	83	80	81	74	318

The top five player scores counted towards the championship.

== Round summaries ==
The 1956 Big Ten Championship was played over two days with two 18-hole rounds played on each day, for a total of 72 holes.

=== First round ===
Friday, May 25, 1955

=== Second round ===
Friday, May 25, 1955

=== Third round ===
Saturday, May 26, 1955

=== Final round ===
Saturday, May 26, 1955

Place	Player	School	Score	To par
1	Joe Campbell	Purdue	71-72-67-71=281	−3
2	Rudy Boyd	Northwestern	70-74-73-72=289	+5
3	Roger Rubendall	Wisconsin	72-77-70-77=296	+12
T4	Ken Rodewald	Michigan State	76-69-76-76=297	+13
T4	Joe Schubeck	Michigan	74-76-73-74=297	+13
6	Dave Forbes	Wisconsin	74-79-75-72=300	+16
T7	Frank Judish	Iowa	76-73-73-79=301	+17
T7	Bob McMasters	Michigan	72-77-77-75=301	+17
T7	Mike Mural	Ohio State	73-77-76-75=301	+17
T7	Fred Michlow	Michigan	78-74-74-75=301	+17
