= 1955 NCAA golf championship =

1955 NCAA Men's Golf Championship
Tournament information
- Dates: June 1955
- Location: Knoxville, Tennessee, U.S. 35.992222°N 83.835278°W
- Courses: Holston Hills Country Club (University of Tennessee)

Statistics
- Field: 33 teams

Champion
- Team: LSU; Individual: Joe Campbell, Purdue
- Team: 574

Location map
- Location in the United States Location in Tennessee

The 1955 NCAA Men's Golf Championship was the 17th annual tournament to determine the national champions of NCAA men's collegiate golf. It was contested in June 1955 at the Holston Hills Country Club in Knoxville, Tennessee.

LSU won the team title and Joe Campbell from Purdue won the individual title.

== Team competition ==
=== Leaderboard ===
Place	Team	Total
1	LSU	574
2	North Texas State	583
3	Oklahoma A&M	587
T4	Houston	591
T4	Stanford	591
T6	Florida	597
T6	San Jose State	597
8	Memphis State	598
T9	Purdue	599
T9	SMU	599
